= 1981 Michigan 500 =

Coordinates: 42°03′58.68″N 84°14′29.18″W

(United States) 1981 Michigan 500
Race details
- Race 5 of 11 in the 1981 CART season
- Date: July 25, 1981
- Official name: 1981 Norton Michigan 500
- Location: Michigan International Speedway, Brooklyn, Michigan, United States
- Course: Permanent racing facility 2.000 mi / 3.219 km
- Distance: 250 laps 500.000 mi / 804.672 km
- Weather: Cloudy with temperatures up to 83 °F (28 °C); wind speeds reaching up to 9 miles per hour (14 km/h)

Pole position
- Driver: (United States) Tom Sneva (Bignotti-Cotter Racing)
- Time: 201.359 mph (324.056 km/h)

Podium
- First: (United States) Pancho Carter (Alex Morales Motorsports)
- Second: (United States) Tony Bettenhausen Jr. (Tony Bettenhausen Jr.)
- Third: (United States) Rick Mears (Team Penske)

The 1981 Michigan 500, the inaugural running of the event, was held at the Michigan International Speedway in Brooklyn, Michigan, on Saturday, July 25, 1981. Branded as the 1981 Norton Michigan 500 for sponsorship reasons, the event was race number 5 of 11 in the 1981 CART PPG Indy Car World Series. The race was won by Pancho Carter - his only Indy Car victory. The race commenced a 20-year history of the Michigan 500 being a part of Indy car racing's Triple Crown.

== Background ==
Indy car racing's Triple Crown began in 1971 when Pocono Raceway opened and held their inaugural Pocono 500, joining the Indianapolis 500 and California 500. This continued for 10 years until late 1980, Ontario Motor Speedway closed and created a void in the Triple Crown where only two 500 mile races would be held.

In 1979, Championship Auto Racing Teams was created as a way for Indy car teams to have greater control over the sport. It led to a split between CART and USAC, where two separate open-wheel schedules were held. In 1980, the two series briefly merged as the Championship Racing League before once again splitting. As Indy car racing entered 1981, USAC retained sanctioning control of the Indianapolis 500 and Pocono 500.

For the majority of the first twelve years of Michigan International Speedway, the July Indy car race was a 200-mile event. On February 26, 1981, track-owner Roger Penske announced that the race would be extended to 500 miles.

With NBC providing live coverage, the Michigan 500 would become the second 500-mile auto race to be aired live in its entirety, joining NASCAR's Daytona 500. At the time of the announcement, NBC's vice-president of sports programming, Dick Auerbach, said, "With the squabbles they've been having at Indianapolis recently, I think this race will be the 500-mile race of the future. It could supplant the Memorial Day race within a few years."

Penske insisted the creation of the Michigan 500 was not an attempt for CART to supplant the Indianapolis 500, but rather just a chance to build a successful event. "We have the finest racing facility in the country today. With the proper presentation we can build this to be a major event. It's a good business decision. We have no conflict with Indy."

Crowd enthusiasm was very high for the change in distance to 500 miles. Penske declared that ticket sales had almost doubled compared to the 200 mile event in July 1980. "The moment we announced we were going to have a 500-mile Indy car race here, it was like I had invented a new formula. The ticket sales jumped almost 100 percent over last year."

Bobby Unser won the 1981 Indianapolis 500 for Team Penske but had his win stripped away due to a rules violation and given to Mario Andretti. While the win was returned to Unser through a USAC appeal in October, as of July's Michigan 500, Andretti was still considered the winner of that year's Indianapolis 500.

USAC's Pocono 500 was held in June and was won by A. J. Foyt. CART teams boycotted the event and the field was filled with dirt cars. Tom Sneva, Dick Simon, Roger Rager, Jim McElreath, Tom Bigelow, Geoff Brabham, and Dean Vetrock were suspended by CART for 60 days for competing in the Pocono 500, a suspension that would extend through the Michigan 500. The drivers filed a lawsuit against CART in United States District Court for the Northern District of Georgia which was successful and overturned their suspension, allowing them to enter the Michigan 500.

After not committing to join CART for two years, A. J. Foyt obtained CART membership on July 13, and entered the Michigan 500. Mario Andretti skipped the Michigan 500 in order to run the 1981 British Grand Prix.

== Practice and Time Trials ==
In Wednesday's opening three-hour practice, Johnny Rutherford and Tom Sneva posted the fastest practice speed when they ran identical lap speeds of 197.8 mph. Team Penske drivers Rick Mears and Bill Alsup ran laps at 196.7 mph, followed by Pancho Carter at 196 mph.

The opening round of Time Trials was held on Thursday afternoon. Tom Sneva won the pole with a speed of 201.359 mph. Johnny Rutherford and Rick Mears posted the second and third fastest speeds to occupy spots on the front row.

Salt Walther led second day qualifiers on Friday with a speed of 193.876 mph.

On Saturday, July 19, Roger Penske exercised his "promoter's option" and expanded the starting field to 37 starters. Two alternate starters and the top-two finishers from a 10-lap qualifying race were added. Steve Chassey and Bill Tempero were added to the starting grid by posting the 34th and 35th fastest qualifying speeds, but they were bound to compete in the qualifying race, along with Harry MacDonald, Jerry Sneva, Jim Buick, Phil Caliva, Bob Frey, John Mahler, Pete Halsmer and Rich Vogler.

Eight cars entered Saturday's 10-lap qualifying race, with Halsmer and Vogler being unable to compete due to mechanical issues and a practice crash, respectively. The race was won by Chassey, who had a half-mile lead when Jerry Sneva and Jim Buick crashed on lap eight. Buick was transported to a local hospital after complaining of shoulder pains but was released later that day. MacDonald and Caliva were the only two other cars to finish, and were added to the Michigan 500 field.

== Race ==
A constant rain marred race day on Sunday July 19. Once it became apparent the rain would not stop, the race was postponed until the following Saturday. While the possibility existed for the race to be run on Monday, (with NBC taping the event for later broadcast), Roger Penske decided to run the following weekend to retain spectators.

"The best thing would be to run the next day, Penske said. "The decision was made because of the wonderful support we've had, from the press and from all of the fans. We felt we needed to give them the opportunity to come back. We're trying to help the fans, and I think you'll see most of them come back."

A practice session was held on Friday, July 24, ahead of the rescheduled race. Polesitter Tom Sneva posted the fastest practice speed at 199.5 mph.

When the race began, Tom Sneva pulled out to a lead. At the beginning of lap two, Larry Cannon spun in turn two and continued.

The restart came out on lap five and Johnny Rutherford quickly passed Sneva for the lead. In turn one, Gordon Johncock and Bill Whittington crashed.

On lap 25, Bill Tempero blew an engine in turn one. Larry Dickson lightly hit the wall after hitting the oil and Pancho Carter spun into the infield grass. Under caution, Herm Johnson's car caught fire while refueling. The methanol fire spread uncontrolled to other pit boxes as people fled. Tires exploding from the heat caused loud explosions. Heroic work from firefighters kept the fuel tanks from exploding. Track fire crews were unable to completely extinguish the blaze, firefighters from the Cambridge Township Department were summoned and were able to extinguish the fire in five minutes.

14 people were injured in the fire. 12 were treated for minor burns at the track hospital, including Johnson who had minor facial burns. Graig Nelson, a Johnson crew member, was hospitalized with first and second degree burns to his feet. Jay Signore, a Team Penske crewman for Bobby Unser, suffered a cut leg and was hospitalized. The race was red-flagged for 97 minutes while fire damage was cleaned and fire damaged-equipment was replaced. It was the third pit fire in two months, following a fire in Rick Mears's pit during the Indianapolis 500 and a previous fire for Herm Johnson at Milwaukee.

After the restart, Tom Sneva ran in close company with Mike Mosley. Mosley took the lead and extended his advantage to seven seconds over Sneva by the time he stopped for fuel on lap 76.

On lap 81, A. J. Foyt crashed hard into the turn two wall. Foyt was knocked unconscious in the impact and his right arm was nearly severed by the guard rail. He suffered a wound to his left leg and a compound fracture to his right arm along with severe lacerations to his arm. He was airlifted to the University of Michigan hospital in Roger Penske's personal helicopter where he underwent surgery.

On lap 96, Sneva's car experienced gearbox failure with the car stuck in third gear. He retired from the race after completing 107 laps.

While leading on lap 112, Johnny Rutherford ran over debris and blew a right-rear tire on the backstretch. The car spun 360 degrees and Rutherford continued back to the pits. Suspension damage knocked him out of the race. The misfortune for Rutherford allowed Pancho Carter to return to the lead lap.

Suspension issues knocked Bobby Unser out of contention for the win. After leading 34 laps, Mike Mosley fell out of the race with engine problems.

On lap 144, Carter received a push start after stalling on pit road.

Al Unser assumed the lead and paced the field for 46 laps. Unser's chances of winning ended on lap 196 when he blew an engine while leading.

Pancho Carter had battled Unser for the lead past the halfway point and led the final 55 laps, beating Tony Bettenhausen Jr. to the finish line by two seconds. It was Carter's first win in 78 starts. Only 10 of the 37 starters finished the race.

Second-place finisher, Tony Bettenhausen Jr. filed an appeal claiming Carter's push start on lap 144 was in violation of CART rules. With an affidavit from Tom Sneva, who had retired earlier in the race, Bettenhausen appealed to CART stewards, seeking a penalty for Carter, but was denied later that evening.

== Box score ==
Finish	Grid	No	Name	Entrant	Chassis	Engine	Laps	Time/Status	Led	Points
1	4	5	(United States) Pancho Carter	Alex Morales Motorsports	Penske PC-7	Cosworth	250	3:45:45.00	91	105
2	20	16	(United States) Tony Bettenhausen Jr.	Bettenhausen Motorsports	McLaren M24B	Cosworth	250	+2.000	5	80
3	3	6	(United States) Rick Mears	Penske Racing	Penske PC-9B	Cosworth	248	+2 Laps	2	70
4	7	7	(United States) Bill Alsup	Penske Racing	Penske PC-9B	Cosworth	247	+3 Laps	2	60
5	21	56	(United States) Tom Bigelow	Gohr Racing	Penske PC-7	Chevrolet	247	+3 Laps	0	50
6	18	12	(United States) Gary Bettenhausen	Rhoades Racing	Wildcat Mk8	Cosworth	247	+3 Laps	0	40
7	31	37	(United States) Scott Brayton	Forsythe Racing	Penske PC-7	Cosworth	238	+12 Laps	0	30
8	37	47	(Italy) Phil Caliva	Intersec Security	McLaren M16E	Chevrolet	235	+15 Laps	0	25
9	24	31	(United States) Larry Dickson	Machinists Union Racing	Penske PC-7	Cosworth	229	+21 Laps	0	20
10	17	35	(United States) Bob Lazier	Fletcher Racing Team	Penske PC-7	Cosworth	225	Engine	0	15
11	10	8	(United States) Al Unser	Longhorn Racing	Longhorn LR02	Cosworth	196	Engine	46	10
12	16	99	(United States) Larry Cannon	Kraco Racing	Penske PC-7	Cosworth	190	Crash	0	5
13	32	66	(United States) Roger Rager	Roger Rager	Wildcat	Chevrolet	185	+65 Laps	0	5
14	22	38	(United States) Jerry Karl	Jerry Karl	McLaren M16E	Chevrolet	178	Clutch	0	5
15	26	42	(United States) Bill Vukovich II	Rattlesnake Racing	Watson	Offenhauser	175	Engine	0	5
16	9	3	(United States) Bobby Unser	Penske Racing	Penske PC-9B	Cosworth	162	Engine	0	5
17	5	40	(United States) Steve Krisiloff	Patrick Racing	Wildcat Mk8	Cosworth	153	Overheating	0	5
18	12	48	(United States) Mike Mosley	All American Racers	Eagle 81	Chevrolet	144	Engine	34	5
19	19	55	(Mexico) Josele Garza	Psachie-Garza Racing	Penske PC-9	Cosworth	141	Engine	0	5
20	34	64	(United States) Steve Chassey	Jet Engineering	Eagle	Chevrolet	131	Engine	0	5
21	36	45	(Canada) Harry MacDonald	Armstrong Mould Racing Team	Lola T500	Cosworth	120	Engine	0	0
22	2	1	(United States) Johnny Rutherford	Chaparral Racing	Chaparral 2K	Cosworth	112	Crash	38	0
23	1	2	(United States) Tom Sneva	Bignotti-Cotter Racing	March 81C	Cosworth	107	Transmission	32	5
24	25	33	(Australia) Vern Schuppan	Theodore Racing	McLaren M24B	Cosworth	95	Engine	0	0
25	33	57	(Canada) Cliff Hucul	Hucul Racing	McLaren	Offenhauser	89	Engine	0	0
26	6	14	(United States) A. J. Foyt	A. J. Foyt Enterprises	Coyote 80	Cosworth	80	Crash	0	0
27	14	72	(United States) Mike Chandler	National Engineering	Penske PC-7	Cosworth	79	Halfshaft	0	0
28	11	32	(United States) Kevin Cogan	Jerry O'Connell Racing	Phoenix 80	Cosworth	70	Engine	0	0
29	29	49	(United States) Chip Mead	Space Racing	Eagle	Chevrolet	70	Engine	0	0
30	27	96	(United States) Dick Ferguson	Kraco Racing	Wildcat	Offenhauser	64	Engine	0	0
31	30	22	(United States) Dick Simon	Leader Card Racers	Watson	Cosworth	63	Oil pressure	0	0
32	28	21	(United States) Salt Walther	Bignotti-Cotter Racing	Phoenix 80	Cosworth	53	Engine	0	0
33	23	28	(United States) Herm Johnson	Team Menard	Lightning	Chevrolet	26	Pit fire	0	0
34	35	15	(United States) Bill Tempero	Bill Tempero	McLaren M16E	Chevrolet	23	Engine	0	0
35	15	29	(United States) Billy Engelhart	Beaudoin Racing	McLaren M24	Cosworth	18	Valve	0	0
36	13	20	(United States) Gordon Johncock	Patrick Racing	Wildcat Mk8	Cosworth	4	Crash	0	0
37	8	94	(United States) Bill Whittington	Whittington Bros.	March 81C	Cosworth	4	Crash	0	0

=== Race Statistics ===
- Average Speed: 132.890 mph (213.866 km/h)
- Lead changes: 15 among 8 drivers

Lap Leaders
From Lap	To Lap	Total Laps	Leader
1	4	4	Tom Sneva
5	9	5	Johnny Rutherford
10	37	28	Tom Sneva
38	38	1	Mike Mosley
39	40	2	Johnny Rutherford
41	54	14	Mike Mosley
55	56	2	Rick Mears
57	75	19	Mike Mosley
76	80	5	Tony Bettenhausen Jr.
81	111	31	Johnny Rutherford
112	142	31	Al Unser
143	178	36	Pancho Carter
179	181	3	Al Unser
182	183	2	Bill Alsup
184	195	12	Al Unser
196	250	55	Pancho Carter

== Standings after the race ==
Drivers' Championship standings

Pos	Driver	Points
1	(United States) Pancho Carter	132
2	(United States) Rick Mears	123
3	(United States) Tony Bettenhausen Jr.	89
4	(United States) Bill Alsup	80
5	(United States) Johnny Rutherford	61

== Broadcasting ==
The Michigan 500 was the first time ever that a 500-mile Indy Car race was broadcast live in its entirety. NBC's broadcast was overseen by Don Ohlmeyer, who said, "We probably put as much effort into preparing for this telecast as we have ever put into any single sports event."

Paul Page and Charlie Jones did the play-by-play coverage for NBC. Gary Gerould and Bruce Jenner served as pit reporters.

NBC aired a qualifying report and race preview on Saturday, July 18. The car driven by Bill Alsup carried an onboard camera.

Because of the rain delay, Ohlmeyer estimated it would cost NBC "a quarter of a million dollars" to bring its cameras and crew back to Michigan for the rescheduled race one week later.

Previous race: 1981 Kraco Twin 125	CART PPG Indy Car World Series; 1981 season	Next race: 1981 Los Angeles Times 500
Previous race: 1980 Norton 200	Michigan 500	Next race: 1982 Michigan 500
