= 1980 USAC Championship Car season =

Sports season

- Championship Racing League
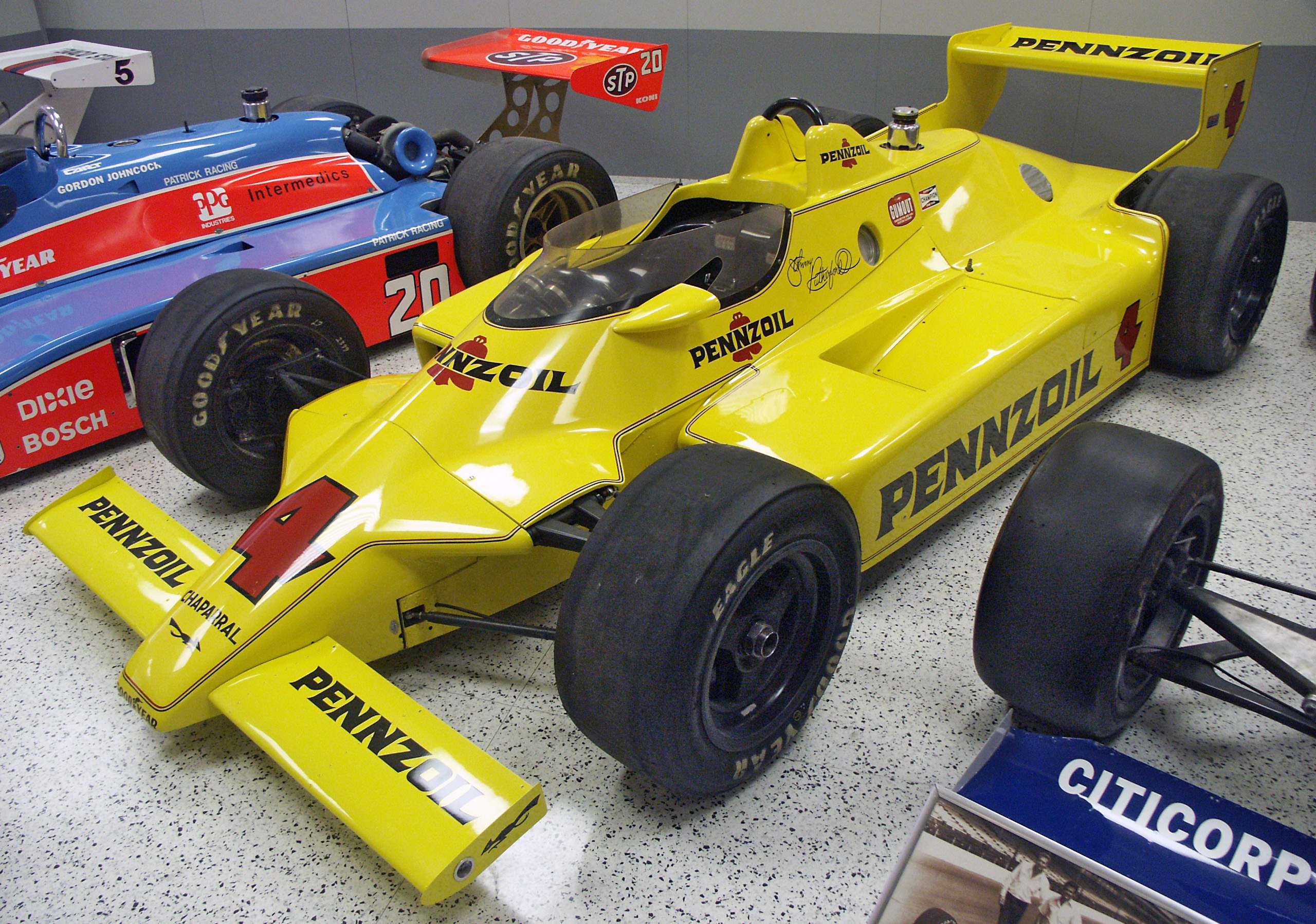
- Champion: Johnny Rutherford

Season
- Races: 5
- Start date: April 13
- End date: July 13

Awards
- National champion: (United States) Johnny Rutherford
- Indianapolis 500 winner: (United States) Johnny Rutherford

The 1980 USAC Championship Car season consisted of five races, beginning in Ontario, California on April 13 and concluding in Lexington, Ohio on July 13. The USAC National Champion and Indianapolis 500 winner was Johnny Rutherford.

One year after the first open wheel "Split", USAC and CART came together under the banner of the Championship Racing League (CRL). The entire season was supposed to be co-sanctioned by CART and USAC. However, USAC pulled out the CRL arrangement in July after only five races. USAC declared their 1980 season over, while CART finished out the remainder of their 1980 season on their own.

Johnny Rutherford, driving Jim Hall's revolutionary ground effects Chaparral 2K won three of the five races (including Indianapolis), and finished second in the other two. Rutherford won the USAC championship by a commanding point margin. Rutherford happened to score the most points under both USAC's five-race points distribution and CART's 12-race points championship, securing what could be considered "undisputed" or "unanimous" top driver honors for the calendar year of 1980.

== Schedule ==
USAC announced a 10-race schedule on December 26, 1979, expanding from 7 races in 1979. After the creation of the Championship Racing League, USAC integrated five of its events into a new, 12-race schedule announced on May 6, 1980.

Icon	Legend
O	Oval/Speedway
R	Road course

Rnd	Date	Race name	Track	Location
1	April 13	Datsun Twin 200	O Ontario Motor Speedway	Ontario, California
2	May 26	500 Mile International Sweepstakes	O Indianapolis Motor Speedway	Speedway, Indiana
3	June 8	Gould Rex Mays Classic	O Wisconsin State Fair Park Speedway	West Allis, Wisconsin
4	June 22	True Value 500	O Pocono International Raceway	Long Pond, Pennsylvania
5	July 13	Red Roof Inns 150	R Mid-Ohio Sports Car Course	Lexington, Ohio

=== Schedule changes ===
The schedule included a return to Mosport Park, which had featured in the CART schedule for 1979 before the date was cancelled, as well as two new, 500-kilometre oval races at Charlotte Motor Speedway and the Alabama International Motor Superspeedway in Talladega, helped by a new partnership with NASCAR. After having an all-oval schedule for 1979, three road course events were scheduled, including first-time visits to the Mid-Ohio Sports Car Course and Road Atlanta. After the California 500 defected to CART during the 1979 season, the lone remaining date at Ontario was also switched to CART, and Texas World Speedway would only held one event, in hopes of helping dwindling attendance.

The April 4, 1980 agreement between CART and USAC to form the Championship Racing League came before any of the two series had started their season, and a compromise was reached to keep races as scheduled until a new set of common races was drafted. On April 16, however, the Texas 200 was cancelled by the promoter due to a lack of entries. On May 6, 1980, the Championship Racing League announced that eleven of the remaining 19 races would stay on the combined schedule for a 12-race season. Among USAC-sanctioned events, the new races at Charlotte, Talladega, Road Atlanta and Mosport were scratched from the schedule.

With the Championship Racing League partnership being dissolved on June 30, 1980, it was decided to keep the Mid-Ohio race as the last one under the CRL banner, while the Milwaukee Mile, which was the lone remaining venue under USAC sanctioning for the season, switched to CART sanctioning on July 8. With no races left to sanction, and most of its affiliated teams competing in CART for sponsorship reasons, USAC quietly shut down its season after a major reorganization in late August. The season standings would include all five races held up to that period, including the CART-sanctioned Datsun Twin 200.

==== Cancelled events ====
Race name	Track	City	Original date
Texas 200	O Texas World Speedway	College Station, Texas	April 26
Road Atlanta 200	R Road Atlanta	Braselton, Georgia	July 27
Indy-Car 500 at Talladega	O Alabama International Motor Speedway	Lincoln, Alabama	August 24
Mosport 200	R Mosport Park	Bowmanville, Ontario	September 14
Charlotte 500	O Charlotte Motor Speedway	Concord, North Carolina	September 28

== Results ==
Rd	Race	Pole position	Most laps led	Race winner				Report
Rd	Race	Pole position	Most laps led	Driver	Team	Chassis	Engine	Report
1	Ontario	(United States) Johnny Rutherford	(United States) Johnny Rutherford	(United States) Johnny Rutherford	Chaparral Cars	Chaparral 2K	Cosworth	
2	Indianapolis 500	(United States) Johnny Rutherford	(United States) Johnny Rutherford	(United States) Johnny Rutherford	Chaparral Cars	Chaparral 2K	Cosworth	Report
3	Milwaukee	(United States) Gordon Johncock	(United States) Gordon Johncock	(United States) Bobby Unser	Team Penske	Penske PC-9/80	Cosworth	
4	Pocono	(United States) Bobby Unser	(United States) Bobby Unser	(United States) Bobby Unser	Team Penske	Penske PC-9/80	Cosworth	Report
5	Mid-Ohio	(United States) Al Unser	(United States) Rick Mears	(United States) Johnny Rutherford	Chaparral Cars	Chaparral 2K	Cosworth	

== Final points standings ==
Pos	Driver	ONT (United States)	INDY (United States)	MIL (United States)	POC (United States)	MOH (United States)	Pts
1	(United States) Johnny Rutherford	**1***	**1***	2	2	1	2740
2	(United States) Tom Sneva	2	2	6	3	11	1970
3	(United States) Bobby Unser	23	19	1	**1***	15	1334
4	(United States) Gordon Johncock	3	4	**3***	Wth	2	1330
5	(United States) Pancho Carter	18	6	4	6	7	1078
6	(United States) Bill Alsup	7	DNQ	9	4	3	990
7	(United States) Rick Mears	21	5	5	12	9*	766
8	(United States) Gary Bettenhausen		3	12	33	20	726
9	(United States) Sheldon Kinser	13	DNQ	11	7	24	345
10	(United States) Danny Ongais		7	24	18	21	330
11	(United States) Howdy Holmes R		DNQ	15	8	14	266
12	(United States) Tom Bigelow		8				250
13	(United States) Spike Gehlhausen	4	29		Wth		245
14	(United States) Tom Bagley	5	28	23	29	DNS	220
15	(United States) Tim Richmond		9	DNS		22	205
16	(United States) Larry Cannon		33	Wth	9	Wth	205
17	(United States) Roger Mears R	9	DNQ			4	180
18	(United States) Gordon Smiley R	6	25				170
19	(United States) Billy Engelhart		11	10	13		170
20	(Australia) Vern Schuppan		DNQ		5	5	150
21	(United States) Lee Kunzman		DNQ		10	Wth	150
22	(United States) Greg Leffler R		10				150
23	(United States) Tom Gloy R					6	120
24	(United States) Jerry Sneva		17	8	14		120
25	(United States) Herm Johnson	14	DNQ	17	11		116
26	(United States) Dick Ferguson	8	31	Wth			105
27	(United States) Roger Rager		23		26	8	100
28	(Canada) Cliff Hucul			7			90
29	(United States) Bill Vukovich II		12	21	28		65
30	(United States) Jan Sneva R	10	Wth				60
31	(United States) Rick Muther	24	DNQ	18		10	57
32	(United States) Jerry Karl		21	14	15	18	54
33	(United States) Phil Caliva R	15	DNQ		16	12	50
34	(United States) Al Unser	16	27	20	24	**13**	49
35	(United States) A. J. Foyt	DNS	14		19		45
36	(United States) Ron Shuman R	11	DNQ				40
37	(United States) Mario Andretti		20		17		40
38	(United States) Dick Simon		22	13	21	DNS	38
39	(Australia) Dennis Firestone RY		16		30		30
40	(United States) John Martin		DNQ		20	16	28
41	(United States) Mike Mosley	19	32		23		28
42	(United States) John Wood R	12	DNQ			23	25
43	(United States) Don Whittington R		13				25
44	(United States) George Snider		15		Wth		25
45	(United States) Jim McElreath		24		27		25
46	(United States) Bill Tempero R	17	DNQ	16		17	22
47	(United States) Joe Saldana	25	DNQ		22	Wth	19
48	(United States) Phil Threshie		DNQ	22	25		15
49	(United States) Johnny Parsons		26		DNQ		10
50	(United States) Billie Harvey R			19			6
51	(United States) John Mahler		DNQ	DNQ		19	6
52	(United States) Bill Whittington R		30				5
53	(United States) Al Loquasto		DNQ		31		5
54	(United States) Tony Bettenhausen Jr.		DNQ	DNQ	32	DNQ	5
-	(United States) Hurley Haywood R		18				0
-	(United States) Pete Halsmer R	20	DNQ				0
-	(United States) Ross Davis R	22					0
-	(United States) Janet Guthrie		DNQ	DNQ			0
-	(United States) Bob Harkey		DNQ		DNQ		0
-	(United States) Salt Walther		DNQ				0
-	(United States) Rich Vogler		DNQ				0
-	(United States) Tom Frantz		DNQ				0
-	(United States) Bill Puterbaugh		DNQ				0
-	(United States) Bruce Hill R			DNQ			0
-	(Canada) Frank Weiss		Wth				0
-	(United States) Dana Carter		Wth				0
-	(United States) Bob Frey R				Wth		0
-	(United States) Milt Harper R				Wth		0
Pos	Driver	ONT (United States)	INDY (United States)	MIL (United States)	POC (United States)	MOH (United States)	Pts

Color	Result
Gold	Winner
Silver	2nd place
Bronze	3rd place
Green	4th & 5th place
Light Blue	6th-10th place
Dark Blue	Finished (Outside Top 10)
Purple	Did not finish
Red	Did not qualify (DNQ)
Brown	Withdrawn (Wth)
Black	Disqualified (DSQ)
White	Did not start (DNS)
Blank	Did not participate (DNP)
Blank	Not competing

**In-line notation**
**Bold**	Pole position
Italics	Ran fastest race lap
*	Led most race laps
RY	Rookie of the Year
R	Rookie

== See also ==
- 1980 Indianapolis 500
- 1980 CART PPG Indy Car World Series
