= 1982–83 USAC Championship Car season =

Sports season

- USAC Gold Crown Championship

Season
- Races: 4
- Start date: August 14, 1982
- End date: May 29, 1983

Awards
- National champion: (United States) Tom Sneva
- Indianapolis 500 winner: (United States) Tom Sneva

The 1982–83 USAC Championship Car season consisted of four races, beginning in Springfield, Illinois, on August 14, 1982, and concluding in Speedway, Indiana, on May 29, 1983. The USAC National Champion and Indianapolis 500 winner was Tom Sneva.

By this time, the preeminent national championship season was instead sanctioned by CART.

== Schedule and results ==
All races were run on Oval/Speedway courses.

Rnd	Date	Race name	Length	Track	Location	Type	Pole position	Winning driver
1	August 14	(United States) Tony Bettenhausen 100	100 mi (160 km)	Illinois State Fairgrounds	Springfield, Illinois	Dirt	(United States) Sheldon Kinser	(United States) Bobby Olivero
2	September 6	(United States) Ted Horn Memorial	100 mi (160 km)	DuQuoin State Fairgrounds	Du Quoin, Illinois	Dirt	(United States) Gary Bettenhausen	(United States) Gary Bettenhausen
3	December 4	(United States) Nazareth 100	100 mi (160 km)	Nazareth National Speedway	Nazareth, Pennsylvania	Dirt	(United States) Bob Cicconi	(United States) Keith Kauffman
4	May 29	(United States) Indianapolis 500-Mile Race	500 mi (800 km)	Indianapolis Motor Speedway	Speedway, Indiana	Paved	(Italy) Teo Fabi	(United States) Tom Sneva

== Final points standings ==
Note: Drivers who failed to enter the Indy 500 were not eligible for points.

Pos	Driver	SPR (United States)	DQSF (United States)	NAZ (United States)	INDY (United States)	Pts
1	(United States) Tom Sneva				1*	1000
2	(United States) Al Unser				2	800
3	(United States) Rick Mears				3	700
4	(Australia) Geoff Brabham				4	600
5	(United States) Mark Alderson	4	7	5	DNQ	560
6	(United States) Kevin Cogan				5	500
7	(United States) Joe Saldana	2	8	30	DNP	422
8	(United States) Gary Bettenhausen		**1**	24	DNQ	406
9	(United States) Howdy Holmes				6	400
10	(United States) Ken Schrader	8	12	4	DNQ	360
11	(United States) Larry Rice	6	6		DNQ	320
12	(United States) Pancho Carter				7	300
13	(United States) Rich Vogler	20	19	3	DNQ	296
14	(United States) Sheldon Kinser	**3**	20	DNS	DNQ	288
15	(United States) Bobby Olivero	1	3	26	DNQ	284
16	(United States) Chip Ganassi				8	250
17	(United States) Al Unser Jr.				10	150
18	(United States) Steve Chassey		2	19	11	100
19	(United States) George Snider		15	9	32	95
20	(United States) Chris Kneifel				12	50
21	(United States) Mike Mosley				13	25
22	(United States) Gordon Johncock				14	25
23	(United States) Dick Simon				15	25
24	(United States) Michael Chandler				16	25
25	(United States) Tony Bettenhausen Jr.				17	20
26	(United States) Bill Whittington				18	20
27	(Republic of Ireland) Derek Daly				19	20
28	(United States) Bobby Rahal				20	20
29	(United States) Jerry Nemire	21	18	19	DNP	16
30	(United States) Danny Ongais				21	15
31	(United States) Johnny Parsons				22	15
32	(United States) Mario Andretti				23	15
33	(Mexico) Josele Garza				25	10
34	(United States) Don Whittington				27	10
35	(United States) Roger Mears				28	10
36	(United States) Gary Irvin	22				6
37	(United States) Steve Krisiloff				29	5
38	(United States) A. J. Foyt				31	5
39	(United States) Roger Rager	26			DNQ	4
-	(United States) Keith Kauffman	18	16	1		0
-	(United States) Bill Engelhart	9	4	2		0
-	(United States) Rick Hood	7	5			0
-	(United States) Ron Shuman	5	24	12		0
-	(United States) Paul Koch			6		0
-	(United States) Steve Siegel			7		0
-	(United States) Gary Hieber			8		0
-	(United States) Scott Brayton				9	0
-	(United States) Mike Peters	11	9			0
-	(United States) Jerry Weeks		10	28		0
-	(United States) Walt Kennedy	10				0
-	(United States) Danny Frye Jr.			10		0
-	(United States) Steve Kinser		11	17		0
-	(United States) Tracy Potter			11		0
-	(United States) Dana Carter	12	21	23		0
-	(United States) Joe McCarthy		13	16		0
-	(United States) Ron Burke	13				0
-	(United States) Ed Angle			13		0
-	(United States) Bob Cicconi	23	14	**22**		0
-	(United States) Doug Wolfgang	14				0
-	(United States) Bobby Allen			14		0
-	(United States) Larry Dickson	DNQ		15		0
-	(United States) Arnie Knepper	15				0
-	(United States) Elvin Felty	16				0
-	(United States) Chuck Amati	17	21	DNS		0
-	(United States) Mike Gregg		17			0
-	(United States) Smokey Snellbaker			18		0
-	(United States) Mike Winblad	19				0
-	(United States) Manny Rockhold			20		0
-	(United States) Duke Cook		22			0
-	(United States) Barry Camp			23		0
-	(United States) Emmitt Hahn	24				0
-	(Australia) Dennis Firestone				24	0
-	(United States) Steve Cannon	25		27		0
-	(United States) Tom Bigelow		25		DNQ	0
-	(United States) Brian Seidel			25		0
-	(Italy) Teo Fabi				**26**	0
-	(United States) Patrick Bedard				30	0
-	(United States) Chet Fillip				33	0
-	(United States) Bill Alsup				DNQ	0
-	(United States) Jim Buick				DNQ	0
-	(United States) Phil Caliva				DNQ	0
-	(United States) Larry Cannon				DNQ	0
-	(United States) Steve Chassey				DNQ	0
-	(United States) Chuck Ciprich				DNQ	0
-	(United States) Dick Ferguson				DNQ	0
-	(United States) Bob Frey				DNQ	0
-	(United States) Amber Furst				DNQ	0
-	(United States) Spike Gehlhausen				DNQ	0
-	(United States) Pete Halsmer				DNQ	0
-	(United States) Bob Harkey				DNQ	0
-	(United States) Doug Heveron				DNQ	0
-	(United States) Herm Johnson				DNQ	0
-	(United States) Jerry Karl				DNQ	0
-	(United States) Phil Krueger				DNQ	0
-	(United States) Bob Lazier				DNQ	0
-	(United States) Greg Leffler				DNQ	0
-	(United States) Al Loquasto				DNQ	0
-	(Canada) Harry MacDonald				DNQ	0
-	(United States) John Mahler				DNQ	0
-	(United States) Mack McClellan				DNQ	0
-	(New Zealand) Graham McRae				DNQ	0
-	(United States) John Paul Jr.				DNQ	0
-	(United States) Dave Peperak				DNQ	0
-	(Belgium) Teddy Pilette				DNQ	0
-	(United States) Johnny Rutherford				DNQ	0
-	(United States) Jerry Sneva				DNQ	0
-	(United States) Bill Tempero				DNQ	0
-	(United States) Bill Vukovich II				DNQ	0
-	(South Africa) Desiré Wilson				DNQ	0
-	(Peru) Jorge Koechlin				DNP	0
-	(United States) Lee Kunzman				DNP	0
-	(New Zealand) Dave McMillan				DNP	0
-	(United States) Chip Mead				DNP	0
-	(United States) Bill Puterbaugh				DNP	0
-	(United States) Harry Sauce				DNP	0
Pos	Driver	SPR (United States)	DQSF (United States)	NAZ (United States)	INDY (United States)	Pts

Color	Result
Gold	Winner
Silver	2nd place
Bronze	3rd place
Green	4th & 5th place
Light Blue	6th-10th place
Dark Blue	Finished (Outside Top 10)
Purple	Did not finish (Ret)
Red	Did not qualify (DNQ)
Brown	Withdrawn (Wth)
Black	Disqualified (DSQ)
White	Did not start (DNS)
Blank	Did not participate (DNP)
Blank	Not competing

**In-line notation**
**Bold**	Pole position
Italics	Ran fastest race lap
*	Led most race laps
Rookie of the Year
Rookie

== See also ==
- 1983 Indianapolis 500
- 1982 CART PPG Indy Car World Series
- 1983 CART PPG Indy Car World Series
