= 1980 Champ Car season =

The 1980 Champ Car season may refer to:

- the 1980 USAC Championship Car season
- the 1980 CART PPG Indy Car World Series, sanctioned by CART, who would later become Champ Car
