= 1980 USAC Mini-Indy Series season =

Formula Super Vee championship

1980 USAC Mini Indy Series season

Seasons
- ← 1979 none →

The 1980 USAC Mini Indy Series season was the fourth and final season of the USAC sanctioned Formula Super Vee championship. All rounds were sanctioned by the USAC and a part of the 1980 SCCA Formula Super Vee season.

== Race calendar and results ==
Round	Circuit	Location	Date	Pole position	Fastest lap	Winner
1	The Milwaukee Mile	(United States) West Allis, Wisconsin	8 June	(New Zealand) Dave McMillan		(United States) Billy Scyphers, Jr.
2	Pocono International Raceway	(United States) Long Pond, Pennsylvania	22 June	(United States) John Kalagian		(Mexico) Josele Garza
3	Mid-Ohio Sports Car Course	(United States) Lexington, Ohio	13 July	(New Zealand) Dave McMillan		(New Zealand) Dave McMillan
4	Minnesota State Fair	(United States) St. Paul, Minnesota	23 August	(United States) Pete Halsmer		(United States) Peter Kuhn
5	Minnesota State Fair	(United States) St. Paul, Minnesota	24 August	(United States) Dick Moody		(United States) Peter Kuhn
6	Ontario Motor Speedway	(United States) Ontario, California	30 August	(United States) Billy Scyphers, Jr.		(United States) Peter Halsmer

== Teams and drivers ==
No.	Driver	Owner	Car	Engine
1	Dennis Firestone	Championship Racing Stables	March	Volkswagen
2	Mike Chandler	Championship Racing Stables	March 80SV	Volkswagen
4	Pete Halsmer	Frank Arciero	Ralt RT5	Volkswagen
5	Dave McMillan	David Psachie	Ralt RT5	Volkswagen
6	Ron Gregg			Volkswagen
9	Paul Tavilla			Volkswagen
11	Josele Garza	David Psachie	Ralt RT1	Volkswagen
14	Domenick Billera	Lexa Billera	Modus	Volkswagen
15	Doug Clark	Fleet Power Racing	Ralt RT1	Volkswagen
17	Billy Scyphers, Jr.	Billy Scyphers	Ralt RT5	Volkswagen
18	Peter Kuhn	Driftwood Racing	Ralt RT1	Volkswagen
19	John Kalagian	Beth Ardisana	March 80SV	Volkswagen
21	Richard Hubbard	Hubbard Enterprises	Ralt RT1	Volkswagen
23	Dick Moody	J. Richard Moody	Ralt RT5	Volkswagen
26	Bruno Beilcke	Crown Auto Body Air	March 80SV	Volkswagen
28	Jim Harvey	Jim Harvey	March 79SV	Volkswagen
29	Pat Jesmore			Volkswagen
30	Roy Kischell	Don Kischell		Volkswagen
39	Richard Tallon	TII Racing	Pheasant	Volkswagen
45	Jeff Brown	J.X. Palms Co.		Volkswagen
46	Stuart Moore	Janet Moore	Ralt RT1	Volkswagen
47	Ray Lipper	Center Line Tool Company	Autoresearch	Volkswagen
49	Joe Gimpel, Jr.	Gimpel Racing	March	Volkswagen
55	Ed Pimm	Fleet Power Racing	Ralt RT1	Volkswagen
56	Craig Carter	Peerless Racing Enterprises	Lola	Volkswagen
57	Mike Martz			Volkswagen
70	Ron Drew	Ronald Drew	Lola	Volkswagen
72	Gary Pratt	Richard Selix	MRA Riley	Volkswagen
77	Bob Cicconi	Bertil's Racing Engines	March 79SV	Volkswagen
94	David Bruns	David Bruns	Autoresearch	Volkswagen
97	Dave Manzolini	Dave Manzolini	Zink Z14	Volkswagen
98	John Schiesser		Lola	Volkswagen

== Final standings ==
Color	Result
Gold	Winner
Silver	2nd place
Bronze	3rd place
Green	4th & 5th place
Light Blue	6th–10th place
Dark Blue	11th place or lower
Purple	Did not finish
Red	Did not qualify (DNQ)
Brown	Withdrawn (Wth)
Black	Disqualified (DSQ)
White	Did not start (DNS)
Blank	Did not participate (DNP)
Blank	Driver replacement (Rpl)
Blank	Injured (Inj)
Blank	No race held (NH)

Pos.	Driver	(United States) MIL	(United States) POC	(United States) MOH	(United States) MIN1	(United States) MIN2	(United States) ONT	Points
1	(United States) Peter Kuhn	20	6	7	1	1	3	684
2	(United States) Pete Halsmer	3	2	23	4	14	1	628
3	(Mexico) Josele Garza	19	1	16	2	2	24	532
4	(United States) Billy Scyphers, Jr.	1	12		18	3	2	514
5	(United States) Bob Cicconi	4	5		14	4	8	395
6	(New Zealand) Dave McMillan	2	11	1	16			385
7	(United States) Mike Chandler	18	4	3			4	384
8	(United States) John Kalagian	6	15	5	5	15	10	320
9	(Australia) Dennis Firestone	5	7		3	18		304
10	(United States) Ed Pimm	22	3	18	22	7		210
11	(United States) Dick Moody		10	17	12	8	5	194
12	(United States) David Bruns			4			7	180
13	(United States) Bob Lazier			2				160
13	(United States) Roger S. Penske Jr.				11	5	9	160
15	(United States) Gary Pratt	24	9		19	6		127
16	(United States) Stuart Moore	7		8				110
17	(United States) Bruno Beilcke	8	8				20	104
18	(United States) Jan Slesinki			19	6	17		88
19	(United States) Peter Moodie			6				80
19	(United States) Jeff Wood						6	80
21	(United States) Steve Thomson				7	12		70
21	(United States) Pat Bedard				8	11		70
23	(United States) John Schiesser	26	17		9	16		51
24	(United States) Jerrill Rice				17	9	21	47
24	(United States) Ray Lipper	12	16	10			25	47
26	(United States) Dave Manzolini	9						40
26	(United States) Carl Whitney			9				40
28	(United States) Ron Drew	17	25		10			36
29	(United States) Roger Rager				13	10		35
30	(United States) Joe Gimpel, Jr.	10	18					34
31	(United States) Richard Hubbard	11		12				30
32	(United States) Craig Carter	25	22	11				25
33	(United States) Ken Nichols						11	20
34	(United States) Mike Martz	13		14	21			13
35	(United States) Jim Harvey		31				12	12
36	(United States) Roy Kischell	16	24				23	11
37	(United States) Dan Park				15	13		10
37	(United States) Jeff Brown	23	14	25				10
39	(United States) Richard Tallon	14			20			9
39	(United States) Paul Tavilla	15	20					9
41	(United States) Bill Vermeer		32	15				7
41	(United States) Randy Gilmore		19	24				7
43	(United States) Doug Clark		13					5
43	(United States) Dr. Curt Erwin			13				5
43	(United States) Bob Zinnagl						13	5
43	(United States) Don Breidenbach						14	5
43	(United States) Mike McHugh						15	5
43	(United States) Gary Howard						16	5
43	(United States) Pat Jesmore	21	30					5
43	(United States) Domenick Billera		28	22				5
51	(United States) Dean Thompson						17	4
51	(United States) Bob Ward						18	4
51	(United States) Mike Follmer						19	4
51	(United States) Tom Pomeroy			20				4
55	(United States) Bob Boffi			21				3
55	(United States) Jim Giffin		21					3
55	(United States) Richard Shirey						22	3
55	(United States) Tom D'Eath		23					3
59	(United States) A.J. Manning		26					2
59	(United States) Ronn Gregg	27						2
59	(United States) Don Maguire		27					2
59	(United States) Bill Cruse		29					2
