= 1983 Champ Car season =

The 1983 Champ Car season may refer to:

- the 1982–83 USAC Championship Car season, which included one race in 1983, the 67th Indianapolis 500
- the 1983–84 USAC Championship Car season, which included one race in 1984, the 68th Indianapolis 500
- the 1983 CART PPG Indy Car World Series, sanctioned by CART, who later became Champ Car
