= 1982 Champ Car season =

The 1982 Champ Car season may refer to:

- the 1981–82 USAC Championship Car season, which included one race in 1982, the 66th Indianapolis 500
- the 1982–83 USAC Championship Car season, which included three races in 1982
- the 1982 CART PPG Indy Car World Series, sanctioned by CART, who later became Champ Car
