= 1979 USAC Mini-Indy Series season =

1979 USAC Mini Indy Series season

Seasons
- ← 1978 1980 →

The 1979 USAC Mini Indy Series season was the third and final full season of the USAC sanctioned Formula Super Vee championship.

== Race calendar and results ==
Round	Circuit	Location	Date	Pole position	Fastest lap	Winner
1	Texas World Speedway	(United States) College Station, Texas	8 April	(Australia) Geoff Brabham		(Australia) Dennis Firestone
2	Indianapolis Raceway Park	(United States) Brownsburg, Indiana	27 May	(Australia) Geoff Brabham		(United States) Ken Nichols
3	The Milwaukee Mile	(United States) West Allis, Wisconsin	10 June	(Australia) Dennis Firestone		(Australia) Dennis Firestone
4	Pocono International Raceway	(United States) Long Pond, Pennsylvania	24 June	(United States) Gary Bettenhausen		(United States) Ronn Gregg
5	Texas World Speedway	(United States) College Station, Texas	29 July	(United States) Mike Chandler		(United States) Mike Chandler
6	The Milwaukee Mile	(United States) West Allis, Wisconsin	20 August	(Australia) Dennis Firestone		(Australia) Dennis Firestone
7	Minnesota State Fair	(United States) St. Paul, Minnesota	25 August	(United States) Tom Klausler		(Australia) Dennis Firestone
8	Minnesota State Fair	(United States) St. Paul, Minnesota	27 August	(Australia) Geoff Brabham		(Australia) Dennis Firestone

== Final standings ==
Color	Result
Gold	Winner
Silver	2nd place
Bronze	3rd place
Green	4th & 5th place
Light Blue	6th–10th place
Dark Blue	11th place or lower
Purple	Did not finish
Red	Did not qualify (DNQ)
Brown	Withdrawn (Wth)
Black	Disqualified (DSQ)
White	Did not start (DNS)
Blank	Did not participate (DNP)
Blank	Driver replacement (Rpl)
Blank	Injured (Inj)
Blank	No race held (NH)

Pos.	Driver	(United States) TEX1	(United States) IRP	(United States) MIL1	(United States) POC	(United States) TEX2	(United States) MIL2	(United States) MIN1	(United States) MIN2	Points
1	(Australia) Dennis Firestone	1	2	1	2	2	1	1	1	1480
2	(United States) Mike Chandler	3	4	6	7	1	3	2	22	903
3	(Australia) Geoff Brabham	19	3	3	4	5	2	6	6	824
4	(United States) Pete Halsmer	4	9	8	8	12	5	4	2	650
5	(United States) Ken Nichols		1	5	18		23	7	3	507
6	(United States) Ronn Gregg		7	20	1	9	16	9	20	358
7	(United States) Gary Bettenhausen	10	2		3					330
8	(United States) Jim Harvey	7		11		4	7	16	8	315
9	(New Zealand) Dave McMillan					3	4	18	9	304
10	(Canada) Harry MacDonald	18	5	9	6	7				284
11	(United States) Johnny Parsons			4	19		22	21	4	250
12	(United States) Tom Klausler	20	16	15	12		11	5	5	244
13	(United States) Rich Vogler	2	6		26					242
14	(United States) Dale Whittington					6	12	3	21	233
15	(United States) Barry Hartzell	5	14	10	9	14				180
16	(United States) Doug Clark	11	10	19	25	8	19			110
17	(United States) Rich Maier	8	8	21	13					108
18	(United States) Bob Cicconi	13	17	7	11	13	17	20	13	107
19	(United States) Bill Cruse				5			17		104
20	(United States) Dan Park		11				9	15	10	95
21	(United States) Joe Gimpel, Jr.	16		22	14		6			93
22	(United States) Roger Rager							10	7	90
23	(United States) John Kalagian	9		17			10		12	84
24	(United States) Bryan Johnson	6								80
25	(United States) Richard Shirey						8	24		53
26	(United States) Denny Moothart							8		50
27	(United States) Roy Kischell	17	12	23	24	11	20		24	47
28	(United States) Jim Giffin					10	21	12		43
29	(United States) Stuart Moore				10					30
30	(United States) Herm Johnson							19	11	24
30	(United States) Tommy Thomas							11	18	24
32	(United States) Tom D'Eath	12	13							15
33	(United States) Steve Lotshaw		18	12						14
34	(United States) John Sisk	22	19		17					11
35	(United States) Lou Gigliotti							13	16	10
35	(United States) Mark Glembin			16			13			10
35	(United States) Mike Martz		15	13						10
35	(United States) Bill Henderson							14	14	10
39	(United States) Dave Estep						14		17	9
40	(United States) Dana Carter				21		15			8
40	(United States) Rich Pfeiffer				23	15				8
40	(United States) Gary Pratt							23	15	8
43	(United States) Giovanni Angelo			18			24			7
44	(United States) Richard Messier							22	23	6
45	(United States) Jim McElean			14						5
45	(United States) Dave Manzolini				15					5
45	(United States) J.D. Moffatt	15								5
45	(United States) Dominick Billera				16					5
49	(United States) Tim LaWarre						18			4
49	(United States) Benny Scott								19	4
49	(United States) Mark Abel				20					4
52	(United States) Bill Noble	21								3
52	(United States) Roger McCluskey				22					3
52	(United States) Dennis Blackwell	23								3
52	(United States) Jan Slesinski		DNS	24						3
	(United States) Tom Hessert				DNS					
