= 1978 USAC Mini-Indy Series season =

1978 USAC Mini Indy Series season

Seasons
- ← 1977 1979 →

The 1978 USAC Mini Indy Series season was the second season of the USAC sanctioned Formula Super Vee championship.

== Race calendar and results ==
| Round | Circuit | Location | Date | Pole position | Fastest lap | Winner | Headline event |
|---|---|---|---|---|---|---|---|
| 1 | Phoenix International Raceway | (United States) Avondale, Arizona | 18 March | (United States) Fred Phillips | | (United States) Tim Richmond | Jimmy Bryan 150 |
| 2 | Trenton International Speedway | (United States) Trenton, New Jersey | 12 April | (United States) Bill Alsup | | (United States) John Wood | Gabriel 200 |
| 3 | Mosport International Raceway | (Canada) Bowmanville, Ontario | 11 June | (United States) Bill Alsup | | (United States) Bill Alsup | Molson Diamond Indy |
| 4 | The Milwaukee Mile | (United States) West Allis, Wisconsin | 18 June | (United States) William Henderson | | (United States) William Henderson | Rex Mays 150 |
| 5 | Texas World Speedway | (United States) College Station, Texas | 6 August | (Canada) Harry MacDonald | | (Canada) Harry MacDonald | Texas Grand Prix |
| 6 | The Milwaukee Mile | (United States) West Allis, Wisconsin | 20 August | (Australia) Dennis Firestone | | (Australia) Dennis Firestone | Tony Bettenhausen 200 |
| 7 | Ontario Motor Speedway | (United States) Ontario, California | 2 September | (Australia) Dennis Firestone | | (United States) Bill Alsup | California 500 |
| 8 | Ontario Motor Speedway | (United States) Ontario, California | 2 September | (United States) Tommy Thompson | | (Australia) Dennis Firestone | California 500 |
| 9 | Trenton International Speedway | (United States) Trenton, New Jersey | 23 September | (Australia) Dennis Firestone | | (Australia) Geoff Brabham | Machinist Union 150 |
| 10 | Phoenix International Raceway | (United States) Avondale, Arizona | 28 October | (United States) Kevin Cogan | | (United States) Kevin Cogan | Miller High Life Bobby Ball 150 |

== Teams and drivers ==
| No. | Driver | Owner | Car | Engine | Note |
|---|---|---|---|---|---|
| 2 | (United States) Herm Johnson | Austin Johnson | Lola | Volkswagen | |
| 3 | (United States) Fred Phillips | Citation Engineering | Zink | Volkswagen | |
| 10 | (Australia) Dennis Firestone | Crosslé Cars Pacific | March | Volkswagen | |
| 12 | (United States) Dick Ferguson | Race Research Inc. | | Volkswagen | |
| 19 | (United States) John Kalagian | Beth Ardisana | Lynx | Volkswagen | |
| 29 | (United States) Pete Halsmer | Simpson Racers | Lola | Volkswagen | |
| 37 | (United States) Nancy James | Citation Engineering | Zink | Volkswagen | |
| 38 | (South Africa) Desiré Wilson | Citation Engineering | Zink | Volkswagen | |
| 39 | (United States) Richard Tallon | Richard Tallon | Lola | Volkswagen | |
| 41 | (United States) Bill Alsup | William Alsup Jr. | Argo | Volkswagen | |
| 42 | (Canada) Harry MacDonald | HCM Racing | Ralt | Volkswagen | |
| 43 | (United States) John Wood | Bill Scott Racing | | Volkswagen | |
| 45 | (United States) William Henderson | Bertil Racing Engines | Lola | Volkswagen | |
| 46 | (United States) Stuart Moore | Janet Moore | Lola | Volkswagen | |
| 48 | (United States) Dan Park | WREP Industries | | Volkswagen | |
| 50 | (United States) Tommy Thompson | Black American Racers | Lola | Volkswagen | Thompson died from injuries sustained in a crash in the ninth round of the championship |
| 55 | (Australia) Geoff Brabham | David Psachie | Ralt | Volkswagen | |
| 60 | (United States) Bob Cicconi | Lou Cicconi | Lola | Volkswagen | |
| 70 | (United States) Syd Demovsky | Syd Demovsky | Lola | Volkswagen | |
| 77 | (United States) Bryan Johnson | Fitzpatrick Racing Enterprises | | Volkswagen | |
| 82 | (United States) Kevin Cogan | Ralt American Ltd. | Ralt | Volkswagen | |
| 94 | (United States) John Sisk | Aspen Racing | Wheeler | Volkswagen | |
| 97 | (United States) Gary Bettenhausen | American Eagle Racing | Lola | Volkswagen | |
| 98 | (United States) Tim Richmond | Sale Chevrolet | Lola | Volkswagen | |
| 99 | (United States) Dave Bruns | Linne Enterprises | | Volkswagen | |

== Death of Tommy Thompson ==
African-American racing driver Tommy Thompson participated in the ninth round of the championship at Trenton International Speedway. On the final lap of the 42-lap race one of the other competitor slowed down. John Barringer had to swerve to avoid contact. However Thompson hit Barringer. Thompson's left front wheel and Barringer's right rear wheel became locked. Both cars hit the wall head-on. Thompson's car was launched over the wall. Both Barringer and Thompson were transported to St. Francis Medical Center. Thompson succumbed to his injuries on 28 September.

== Final standings ==
| Color | Result |
|---|---|
| Gold | Winner |
| Silver | 2nd place |
| Bronze | 3rd place |
| Green | 4th & 5th place |
| Light Blue | 6th–10th place |
| Dark Blue | 11th place or lower |
| Purple | Did not finish |
| Red | Did not qualify (DNQ) |
| Brown | Withdrawn (Wth) |
| Black | Disqualified (DSQ) |
| White | Did not start (DNS) |
| Blank | Did not participate (DNP) |
| Blank | Driver replacement (Rpl) |
| Blank | Injured (Inj) |
| Blank | No race held (NH) |

| Pos. | Driver | (United States) PIR1 | (United States) TRE1 | (Canada) MOS | (United States) MIL1 | (United States) TEX | (United States) MIL2 | (United States) ONT1 | (United States) ONT2 | (United States) TRE2 | (United States) PIR2 | Points |
|---|---|---|---|---|---|---|---|---|---|---|---|---|
| 1 | (United States) Bill Alsup | 21 | 2 | 1 | 23 | 2 | 10 | 1 | 2 | 4 | 12 | 1046 |
| 2 | (Australia) Dennis Firestone | 5 | 24 | 3 | 22 | 6 | 1 | 24 | 1 | 16 | 2 | 894 |
| 3 | (Canada) Harry MacDonald | DNS | 20 | 4 | 3 | 1 | 26 | 2 | 3 | 23 | 7 | 831 |
| 4 | (United States) Herm Johnson | 16 | 5 | 14 | 2 | 7 | 5 | 5 | 22 | 3 | 5 | 773 |
| 5 | (United States) John Wood | | 1 | 15 | 24 | 3 | 9 | 3 | 5 | 26 | 9 | 674 |
| 6 | (United States) Bob Cicconi | 25 | 21 | 10 | 5 | 27 | 6 | 14 | 19 | 2 | 4 | 506 |
| 7 | (United States) David Bruns | | | | | | 2 | 6 | 4 | 18 | 3 | 504 |
| 8 | (United States) Gary Bettenhausen | | 3 | 17 | 4 | 22 | | 7 | 9 | 28 | 6 | 453 |
| 9 | (United States) Tim Richmond | 1 | 22 | 16 | 7 | 9 | 4 | | | | | 428 |
| 10 | (United States) Ken Nichols | | | | | 4 | 7 | 4 | 18 | 5 | | 404 |
| 11 | (United States) Kevin Cogan | | | | | | 3 | | | | 1 | 340 |
| 12 | (United States) Pete Halsmer | 4 | 9 | 6 | 21 | 24 | 15 | 10 | 10 | 19 | 23 | 318 |
| 13 | (Australia) Geoff Brabham | | | 12 | 6 | | | | | 1 | | 290 |
| 13 | (United States) Fred Phillips | 2 | 4 | | | 13 | | | | 22 | 25 | 290 |
| 15 | (United States) Tommy Thompson | 8 | | 7 | 9 | | | 9 | 8 | 14 | | 245 |
| 16 | (United States) William Henderson | 11 | 18 | 1 | | | | | | | | 224 |
| 17 | (United States) Syd Demovsky | | 8 | 5 | | 19 | 18 | | | 8 | | 208 |
| 18 | (United States) Stuart Moore | | | 2 | | | | 21 | | | | 163 |
| 19 | (United States) Tom Bagley | 3 | | | | | | | | | | 140 |
| 20 | (United States) Dan Park | | | | | | 13 | | | 6 | 8 | 135 |
| 21 | (United States) George Dyer | | | | | 5 | 11 | 16 | | 21 | | 128 |
| 22 | (United States) Jim Giffin | | | | 12 | 10 | | 28 | 6 | | 13 | 127 |
| 23 | (United States) Michael Yoder | | 7 | | | | 7 | | | 15 | | 115 |
| 24 | (United States) John Kalagian | | 27 | | 10 | 20 | | | | 7 | 21 | 99 |
| 25 | (United States) Joe Gimpel Jr. | | 15 | 11 | | 11 | 14 | | | 9 | | 90 |
| 26 | (United States) Ted Field | 13 | 16 | | 19 | 8 | 25 | 23 | | 11 | | 89 |
| 27 | (United States) Bill Cruse | | 6 | | | | | | | | | 80 |
| 27 | (United States) Eddie Miller | 6 | | | | | | | | | | 80 |
| 29 | (United States) Bryan Johnson | | 26 | | | | 24 | 25 | 7 | 20 | 16 | 76 |
| 30 | (United States) John Sisk | | 12 | 8 | | 18 | 23 | | | 17 | 18 | 75 |
| 31 | (United States) Richard Tallon | 12 | 11 | 9 | 28 | | | | | | | 72 |
| 32 | (United States) Dick Simon | | | | 14 | 12 | | 8 | 20 | | | 69 |
| 33 | (United States) Bill Follmer | 7 | | | | | | | | | | 60 |
| 34 | (Canada) Heinz Snizek | | | 8 | | | | | | | | 50 |
| 35 | (United States) G. Scott Ovel | 9 | 14 | | | | | | | | | 45 |
| 36 | (United States) Butch Meyer | 18 | 28 | 16 | | 17 | 17 | 12 | 12 | | 27 | 41 |
| 37 | (United States) Dick Ferguson | 24 | | 13 | 25 | | | | | | 10 | 40 |
| 37 | (United States) Larry Skipsey | | | | | | | 11 | 11 | | | 40 |
| 39 | (United States) Rich Vogler | | | | | | | 22 | | 10 | | 33 |
| 39 | (United States) Benny Scott | | | | | | 16 | 20 | 17 | | 11 | 33 |
| 41 | (United States) Bill Simpson | 10 | | | | | | | | | | 30 |
| 41 | (United States) Domenick Billera | | 10 | | | | | | | | | 30 |
| 43 | (United States) Gary Passon | | 13 | DNS | | 15 | 12 | | | | 20 | 28 |
| 44 | (United States) Doug Clark | | | | | 14 | 27 | 13 | t 15 | 24 | 15 | 25 |
| 45 | (United States) Mike Frangkiser | | | | 11 | | 19 | | | | | 24 |
| 46 | (United States) Roy Kischell | | | | 17 | 28 | 28 | 17 | 16 | | | 17 |
| 47 | (United States) Phil Caliva | 15 | | | | | | 21 | 13 | | | 13 |
| 47 | (United States) Bobby Unser Jr. | 22 | 19 | | 20 | 26 | | | | | | 13 |
| 49 | (United States) Nancy James | | | | | 25 | | | | 12 | | 12 |
| 49 | (United States) Bob Larson | | | | | | | 19 | 14 | | 24 | 12 |
| 51 | (United States) Roger Mears | | | | 26 | | 22 | 15 | | | | 10 |
| 52 | (United States) Dennis Blackwell | | | | | | | 18 | 23 | | 28 | 9 |
| 52 | (United States) Ron Banks | | | | | | | 29 | 21 | | 19 | 9 |
| 54 | (United States) Bert Busby | 23 | | | 15 | | | | | | | 8 |
| 55 | (United States) Bubby Jones | DNS | 17 | | | | | | | | | 6 |
| 55 | (United States) Tom D'Eath | 23 | | | | | | | | | 22 | 6 |
| 57 | (United States) John Barringer | | | | | | | | | 13 | | 5 |
| 57 | (United States) Bill Thelander | | | | 13 | | | | | | | 5 |
| 57 | (United States) Gene Romero | | | | | | | | | | 14 | 5 |
| 57 | (United States) Don Schoeny | 14 | | | | | | | | | | 5 |
| 57 | (United States) Greg Atwell | | | | | 16 | | | | | | 5 |
| 57 | (United States) Bill Noble | | | | | | | 27 | 24 | | | 5 |
| 63 | (United States) Rich Amick | 17 | | | | | | | | | | 4 |
| 63 | (United States) Jan Slesinski | | | | | | | | | | 17 | 4 |
| 63 | (United States) Hank Chapman | | | | 18 | | | | | | | 4 |
| 63 | (United States) Roger Bighouse | | | | | | 20 | | | | | 4 |
| 67 | (United States) Tom Hessert | | | | | 21 | | | | | | 3 |
| 67 | (United States) Bobby Hillin Jr. | | | | | 23 | | | | | | 3 |
| 69 | (United States) Lou Gigliotti | | | | | | | | | 25 | | 2 |
| 69 | (United States) Bobby Olivero | 25 | | | | | | | | | | 2 |
| 69 | (United States) Elliott Forbes-Robinson | 26 | | | | | | | | | | 2 |
| 69 | (United States) Allan Turner | | | | | | | 26 | | | | 2 |
| 69 | (South Africa) Desiré Wilson | | | | | | | | | | 26 | 2 |
| 69 | (United States) Howdy Holmes | | | | 27 | | | | | | | 2 |
| 69 | (United States) Denny Moothart | | | | | | | | | 27 | | 2 |
| | (United States) Mike Randol | | | | | | | | | | | |
