= 1977 USAC Mini-Indy Series season =

1977 USAC Mini Indy Series season

Seasons
- ← none 1978 →

The 1977 USAC Mini Indy Series season was the first season of the USAC sanctioned Formula Super Vee championship which would later be called Indy Lights. The season contested of four races which was held from the 30 April to the 29 October with all of them being support races for the 1977 USAC Championship Car season.

The season would be won by two drivers, Tom Bagley who won the races in Trenton and Bowmanville. Herm Johnson was the other driver who got on the podium three times including a victory in the final round at Avondale.

== Race calendar and results ==
Round	Circuit	Location	Date	Pole position	Fastest lap	Winner
1	Trenton International Speedway	(United States) Trenton, New Jersey	30 April	(United States) Tom Bagley		(United States) Tom Bagley
2	The Milwaukee Mile	(United States) West Allis, Wisconsin	12 June	(United States) Herm Johnson		(United States) Noel Bennett
3	Mosport International Raceway	(Canada) Bowmanville, Ontario	2 July	(United States) Herm Johnson		(United States) Tom Bagley
4	Phoenix International Raceway	(United States) Avondale, Arizona	29 October	(United States) Fred Phillips		(United States) Herm Johnson

== Teams and drivers ==
No.	Driver	Owner	Car	Engine	Note
1	(United States) Tom Bagley	Tom Bagley	Zink	Volkswagen	
90	(United States) Tom Bagley	Tom Bagley	Lola	Volkswagen	
66	(United States) Tom Bagley	Eddie Wachs	Lola	Volkswagen	
2	(United States) Bob Cicconi	Dick O'Dea Racing	Lola	Volkswagen	
3	(United States) Howdy Holmes	Wilbur Bunce Racing	Lola	Volkswagen	
3	(Australia) Vern Schuppan	Wilbur Bunce Racing		Volkswagen	Qualified car
6	(United States) Michael Yoder	David Yoder	Lola	Volkswagen	
7	(United States) Tommy Thompson			Volkswagen	
8	(Canada) Charles Montague	Race Research Inc.		Volkswagen	
8	(United States) Pete Halsmer	Race Research Inc.		Volkswagen	
10	(United States) Noel Bennett	Noel Bennett	Lola	Volkswagen	
12	(United States) Lou Gigliotti		Zink	Volkswagen	
16	(United States) Billy McConnell	WMR Enterprises		Volkswagen	
21	(Canada) Harry MacDonald		Lola	Volkswagen	
13	(Canada) Harry MacDonald		Lola	Volkswagen	
19	(United States) John Kalagian	Beth Ardisana		Volkswagen	
20	(United States) Bill Follmer			Volkswagen	
21	(United States) James George			Volkswagen	
22	(United States) Jerry Peterson			Volkswagen	
33	(United States) Roger McCluskey			Volkswagen	Qualified car
34	(Canada) Howard Kelly			Volkswagen	
36	(United States) Fred Phillips	Steve Lathrop	Zink	Volkswagen	
37	(United States) Gary Bettenhausen			Volkswagen	
38	(United States) Phil Caliva			Volkswagen	
39	(United States) Richard Tallon	Richard Tallon	Lola	Volkswagen	
41	(United States) Bill Alsup	Bill Alsup	Lola	Volkswagen	
44	(United States) Bill Scott	Bill Scott	Lola	Volkswagen	
45	(United States) Phil Krueger	Eric Lee Drange	Lola	Volkswagen	
46	(United States) Stuart Moore	Janet Moore		Volkswagen	
47	(United States) Eddie Miller	Carl Haas	Lola	Volkswagen	
47	(United States) George Batchelor	Carl Haas		Volkswagen	
48	(United States) Dan Park		Lola	Volkswagen	
55	(United States) John Teas			Volkswagen	
60	(United States) Gary Passon	Sharon Passon	Lola	Volkswagen	
61	(United States) Herm Johnson	Austin Johnson	Lola	Volkswagen	
63	(United States) G. Scott Ovel	G. Scott Ovel	Lola	Volkswagen	
68	(United States) Dominick Billera	Lexa Billera	Modus	Volkswagen	
73	(United States) Hardie Beloff		Lola	Volkswagen	
77	(United States) John Barringer	John Barringer	Lola	Volkswagen	
80	(United States) Gary Mesnick			Volkswagen	
86	(United States) Rick Villate		Modus	Volkswagen	
87	(United States) Johnny Kastner	Wilbur Bunce Racing		Volkswagen	
89	(United States) William Henderson	Fox Racing Enterprises	Lola	Volkswagen	

== Final standings ==
Color	Result
Gold	Winner
Silver	2nd place
Bronze	3rd place
Green	4th & 5th place
Light Blue	6th–10th place
Dark Blue	11th place or lower
Purple	Did not finish
Red	Did not qualify (DNQ)
Brown	Withdrawn (Wth)
Black	Disqualified (DSQ)
White	Did not start (DNS)
Blank	Did not participate (DNP)
Blank	Driver replacement (Rpl)
Blank	Injured (Inj)
Blank	No race held (NH)

Pos.	Driver	(United States) TRE	(United States) MIL	(Canada) MOS	(United States) PIR	Points
1.	(United States) Tom Bagley	1	5	1	17	500
1.	(United States) Herm Johnson	16	2	3	1	500
3.	(United States) Howdy Holmes	2	3	9	23	340
4.	(United States) Noel Bennett	4	1	12		330
5.	(United States) Bill Alsup	7	14	7	2	280
6.	(United States) Eddie Miller	3	18	4		260
7.	(United States) Phil Krueger		6	17	4	200
8.	(United States) Gary Passon		4		8	170
9.	(United States) William Henderson	17	19	2		160
9.	(United States) Michael Yoder	5	7	16		160
11.	(United States) Billy McConnell	8		5		150
12.	(United States) Pete Halsmer				3	140
13.	(United States) Richard Tallon		16	22	5	100
14.	(United States) Fred Phillips		9	8	13	90
15.	(United States) Bob Cicconi	6	21			80
15.	(United States) Johnny Kastner				6	80
15.	(United States) Stuart Moore			6		80
15.	(United States) John Barringer	15	8	10	20	80
19.	(United States) Bob Lazier				7	60
20.	(United States) Phil Caliva			25	9	40
20.	(United States) Chris Gleason	9				40
20.	(United States) Domenick Billera	13	11	11		40
23.	(United States) Ted Field				10	30
23.	(United States) Steve Lathrop	10				30
23.	(United States) Bill Scott		10			30
26.	(United States) John Kalagian	12		14	12	20
26.	(United States) Gary Bettenhausen	11		21		20
26.	(United States) Chip Mead				11	20
29.	(United States) G. Scott Ovel		12			10
	(United States) Harry MacDonald	19	17	13	14	
	(United States) Bill Follmer	13			21	
	(United States) Lou Gigliotti		15			
	(United States) Jerry Peterson			15		
	(United States) Bill Thelander				15	
	(United States) Rich Ferguson				16	
	(United States) Rich Amick				18	
	(United States) Hardi Beloff		13			
	(United States) George Batchelor	18				
	(Canada) Howard Kelly			18		
	(United States) Tom D'Eath			19	19	
	(United States) Peter Lissiuk	20				
	(Canada) Charles Montague			20		
	(United States) Dan Park		20			
	(United States) Tommy Thompson	21				
	(United States) James George	22			DNS	
	(United States) Richard Simis				22	
	(United States) Rick Villate		22			
	(United States) Gary Mesnick			23		
	(United States) Nancy James				24	
	(United States) John Teas			24		
	(United States) Roger McCluskey			DNS		
	(United States) Johnny Parsons				DNS	
	(Australia) Vern Schuppan			DNS		
