= Tom D'Eath =

Tom D’Eath is an American hydroplane and racecar driver from Michigan.

== Career summary ==
Tom D'Eath (pronounced deeth) won three American Power Boat Association Gold Cups and three the Prince Edward Canadian Gold Cups. He remains the only three-time winner of both. He has also won National Championships in virtually every other class of hydroplane racing. D'Eath also competed on land, by driving in the USAC Formula Vees from 1977 to 1981 and midget cars from 1982 through his retirement from racing in 1991.

Arguably his most memorable victory was in the bicentennial 1976 APBA Gold Cup unlimited hydroplane race, held on the Detroit River. D'Eath piloted the Miss US to a narrow upset victory over Bill Muncey in the Atlas Van Lines, a hull that won the two previous Gold Cups and the three previous APBA National Championships. In addition to being D'Eath's first Gold Cup win, it was the first Gold Cup win for a turbocharged V-12 Allison aircraft engine, the first for a cabover unlimited hull, and the first Gold Cup win for Miss US owner George Simon, who had competed in unlimited hydroplane racing since 1953.

In 1994 Tom became the first Chairman of the Vintage and Historic Division of APBA.

== Awards ==
- He was inducted into the Motorsports Hall of Fame of America in 2000.
- D'Eath was inducted into the National Polish-American Sports Hall of Fame on June 23, 2011, in Troy, Michigan.

== Racing record ==
=== Complete USAC Mini-Indy Series results ===
Year	Entrant	1	2	3	4	5	6	7	8	9	10	Pos	Points
1977		TRE	MIL	MOS; 19	PIR; 19							-	-
1978		PIR1; 23	TRE1	MOS	MIL1	TEX	MIL2	OMS1	OMS2	TRE2	PIR2; 22	55th	6
1979		TEX1; 12	IRP; 13	MIL1	POC	TEX2	MIL2	MIN1	MIN2			32rd	15
1980		MIL; 23	POC	MOH	MIN1	MIN2	ONT					55th	3
