= Tom Bagley (racing driver) =

American racecar driver

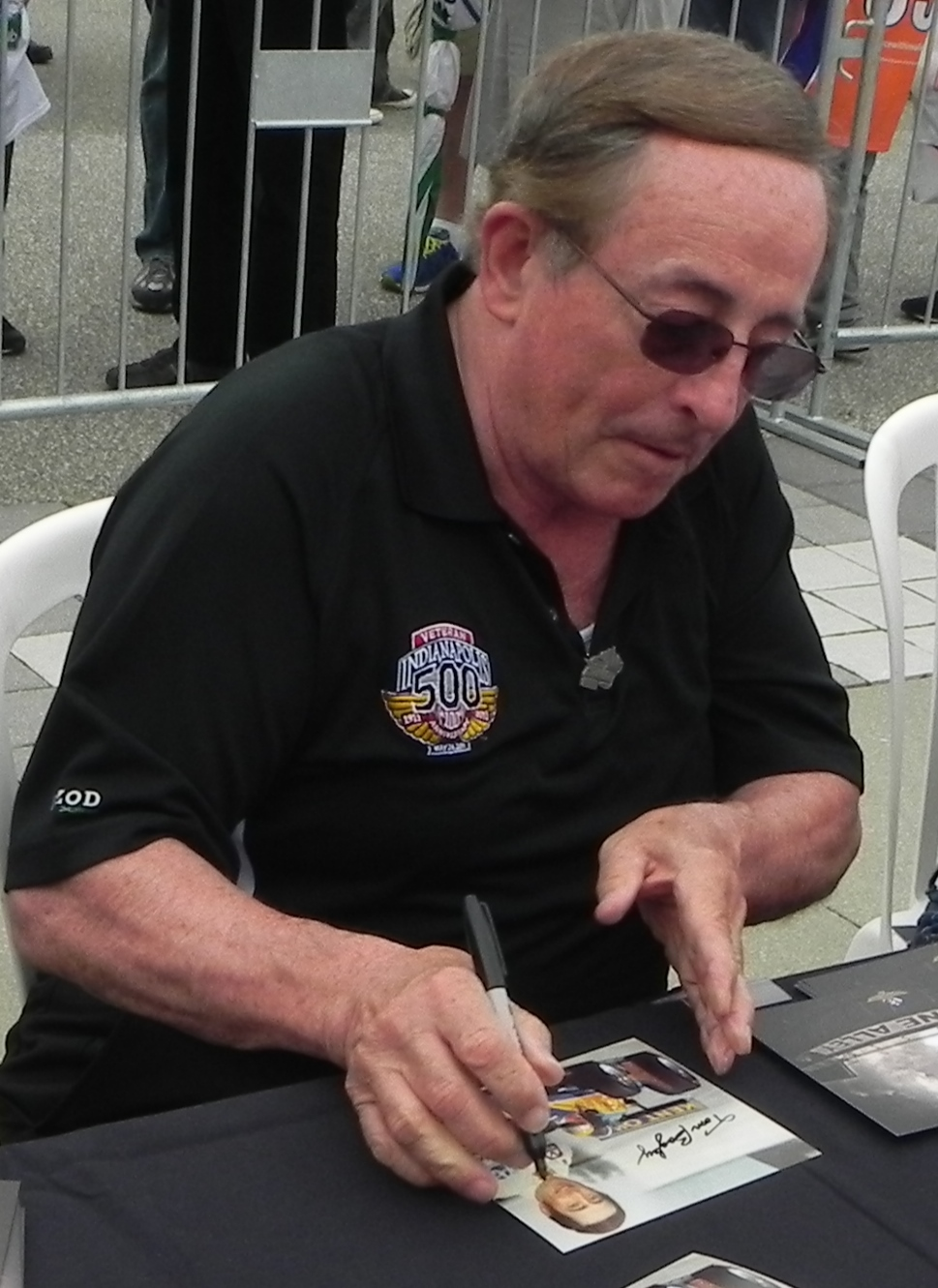
Tom Bagley in 2013

Tom Bagley (born December 3, 1939 in Pittsburgh, Pennsylvania) is a former auto racing driver in the USAC, CART Championship Car, IMSA, Formula Atlantic, and Trans-Am Series. He raced Indycars in the 1978-1980 and 1983 seasons, with 42 combined career starts, including the 1978-1980 Indianapolis 500. He finished in the top-ten 23 times, with a best finish, three times, of fourth position. He was USAC Rookie of the Year in 1978, and did not finish worse than 11th in points during his three full-time seasons.

He did not begin wheel-to-wheel racing until age 31, after earning a master's degree in Physics from Pennsylvania State University. While in college, Bagley became interested in fuel mileage competitions and then autocross, rising to the attention of Bill Scott, operator of the racing school at Summit Point Motorsports Park. Scott lent Bagley a Formula Ford car to begin his career. Bagley and Janet Guthrie were the only physicists to compete in Indycar in the 1970s.

Bagley rose to fame driving Formula Super Vee cars, winning the SCCA championship in 1976, and was the USAC Mini-Indy Series co-champion with Herm Johnson in 1977. Bagley owned and maintained his own race cars in this part of his career. He next joined the Indycar ranks with sponsorship from Kent Oil, driving for Longhorn Racing and later for Patrick Racing.

After retiring from racing full-time, Bagley worked as a physicist for long-time series sponsor PPG Industries, developing new methods for creating powder paints. From 2004 to 2020 he worked at Autobahn Country Club as the Director of Racing Instruction, responsible for designing the safety features at the track and overseeing the instruction, licensing, and racing activities. Bagley still competes in club and endurance races in his Spec Miata and vintage events including the Indy Legends Charity Pro–Am race on occasion. Bagley was described by the SVRA in 2019 as a "driver who accomplished much with limited resources" and "the driver to beat in Formula Super Vee".

== Racing record ==
=== SCCA National Championship Runoffs ===
| Year | Track | Car | Engine | Class | Finish | Start | Status |
|---|---|---|---|---|---|---|---|
| 1972 | Road Atlanta | Royale | Volkswagen | Formula Super Vee | 20 | 4 | Retired |
| 1973 | Road Atlanta | Royale | Volkswagen | Formula Super Vee | 6 | 5 | Running |

=== Formula Super Vee ===
| Year | Team | Chassis | Engine | 1 | 2 | 3 | 4 | 5 | 6 | 7 | 8 | 9 | Rank | Points |
|---|---|---|---|---|---|---|---|---|---|---|---|---|---|---|
| 1976 | | Zinc Z11 | VW Brabham | DAY; 1 | POC; 1 | NLG; 1 | MOS; 18 | WG1; 25 | MOH; 2 | BRN; 1 | ROA; 1 | WG2; 1 | 1st | 115 |

=== Complete USAC Mini-Indy Series results ===
| Year | Entrant | 1 | 2 | 3 | 4 | 5 | 6 | 7 | 8 | 9 | 10 | Pos | Points |
|---|---|---|---|---|---|---|---|---|---|---|---|---|---|
| 1977 | Tom Bagley | TRE; 1 | MIL; 5 | MOS; 1 | PIR; 17 | | | | | | | 1st | 500 |
| 1978 | | PIR1; 3 | TRE1 | MOS | MIL1 | TEX | MIL2 | OMS1 | OMS2 | TRE2 | PIR2 | 19th | 140 |

=== Complete USAC Championship Car results ===
| Year | Entrant | Chassis | Engine | 1 | 2 | 3 | 4 | 5 | 6 | 7 | 8 | 9 | 10 | 11 | 12 | 13 | 14 | 15 | 16 | 17 | 18 | Pos | Points |
|---|---|---|---|---|---|---|---|---|---|---|---|---|---|---|---|---|---|---|---|---|---|---|---|
| 1978 | | | | PHX; 8 | ONT; 17 | TXS; 10 | TRE; 12 | INDY; 27 | MOS; 17 | MIL; 7 | POC; 26 | MIC; 12 | ATL; 6 | TXS; 16 | MIL; DNS | ONT; 4 | MIC; 6 | TRE; 12 | SIL; 13 | BRH; 14 | PHX; 14 | 11th | 1.188 |
| 1979 | Longhorn Racing | Penske | Cosworth | PHX; 8 | ATL; 8 | ATL; 7 | INDY; 9 | TRT; 8 | TRT; 4 | MIC; 6 | MIC; 6 | WGL; 6 | TRT; 7 | ONT; 32 | MIC; 5 | ATL | PHX; 9 | | | | | 8th | 1.208 |
| 1980 | Patrick Racing | Penske Wildcat | Cosworth | ONT; 5 | INDY; 28 | MIL; 23 | POC; 29 | MOH; DNS | MIC; 8 | WGL; 6 | MIL; 4 | ONT; 15 | MIC; 8 | MXS; 18 | PHX; 16 | | | | | | | 11th | 794 |
| 1983 | | | | ATL | INDY | MIL | CLE; DNQ | MIC | ROA | POC; 34 | RIV | MOH | MIC | CPL | LAG | PHX | | | | | | 60th | 0 |

=== Indy 500 results ===
| Year | Chassis | Engine | Start | Finish |
|---|---|---|---|---|
| 1978 | Watson | Offy | 14th | 27th |
| 1979 | Penske | Cosworth | 15th | 9th |
| 1980 | Wildcat | Cosworth | 13th | 28th |
| 1981 | Lola | Cosworth | Failed to Qualify | |

Sporting positions
| Preceded by Eddie Miller | US Formula Super Vee; Champion; 1976 | Succeeded by Bob Lazier |
| Preceded by none | USAC Mini-Indy Series; Champion; 1977 | Succeeded by Bill Alsup |
| Preceded by Danny Ongais | USAC Rookie of the Year; 1978 | Succeeded by Howdy Holmes |
