= John Wood (racing driver, born 1952) =

American racing driver (born 1952)

John J. Wood (born January 23, 1952, in Morristown, New Jersey) is an American former racing driver. He began his career in sports car racing, then ventured briefly into open wheel racing from 1978 to 1980, then returned to sports cars.

After finishing fifth in the USAC Formula Super Vee standings in 1978 with a win at Trenton Speedway, Wood moved up to the CART/USAC Championship Car series in 1980 with Mergard Racing. He made his debut at the Ontario Motor Speedway and finished a respectable 12th place. He then failed to qualify for the 1980 Indianapolis 500. He returned in July to race on the Mid-Ohio Sports Car Course but crashed out on the first lap. He then failed to qualify for the fall race at the Milwaukee Mile and his Champ Car adventure was over.

Wood returned to sports car racing, including both the World Sportscar Championship and the Trans Am Series. Although he never won a major race, he competed in the 24 Hours of Daytona several times.

== Racing record ==
=== Complete USAC Mini-Indy Series results ===
Year	Entrant	1	2	3	4	5	6	7	8	9	10	Pos	Points
1978	Bill Scott Racing	PIR1	TRE1; 1	MOS; 15	MIL1; 24	TEX; 3	MIL2; 9	OMS1; 3	OMS2; 5	TRE2; 26	PIR2; 9	5th	674
