= Rich Vogler =

American racing driver (1950–1990)

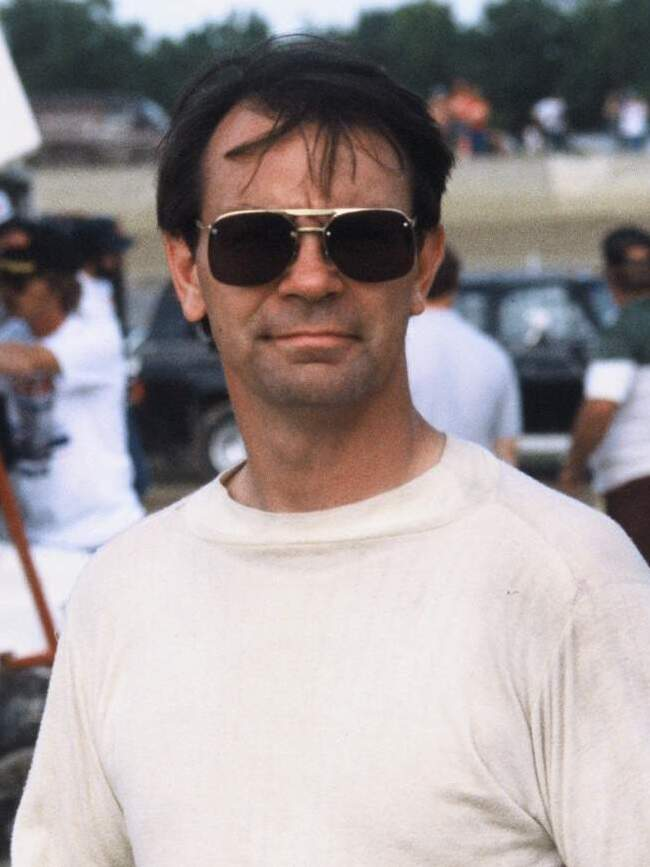
- Born: Richard Frank Vogler; July 26, 1950 Glen Ellyn, Illinois, U.S.
- Died: July 21, 1990 (aged 39) Salem, Indiana, U.S.

Championship titles
- 1978, 1980, 1983, 1986, 1988 USAC National Midget Series Champion; 1980, 1989 USAC National Sprint Car Series Champion

Champ Car career
- 15 races run over 10 years
- Years active: 1980–1983, 1985–1990
- Best finish: 8th – 1981
- First race: 1981 Tony Bettenhausen 100 (Springfield)
- Last race: 1989 Marlboro 500 (Michigan)
- First win: 1981 Ted Horn 100 (DuQuoin)
Wins	Podiums	Poles
1	3	0

Richard Frank Vogler (July 26, 1950 – July 21, 1990) was an American champion sprint car and midget car driver. He was nicknamed "Rapid Rich". He competed in the Indianapolis 500 five times, and his best finish was eighth in 1989.

== Racing career ==
Vogler was the National Alliance of Midget Auto Racing (NAMAR) midget champion in 1973. He won the midget car track championships at the Indianapolis Speedrome in 1984 and 1985. He won the Fireman Nationals midget car race at Angell Park Speedway in 1985. Vogler became the first driver to win the USAC Sprint Car and Midget championships in the same year (1980). He won USAC National Sprint Car Series championships in 1980 and 1989, USAC National Midget Series championships in 1978, 1980, 1983, 1986, and 1988.

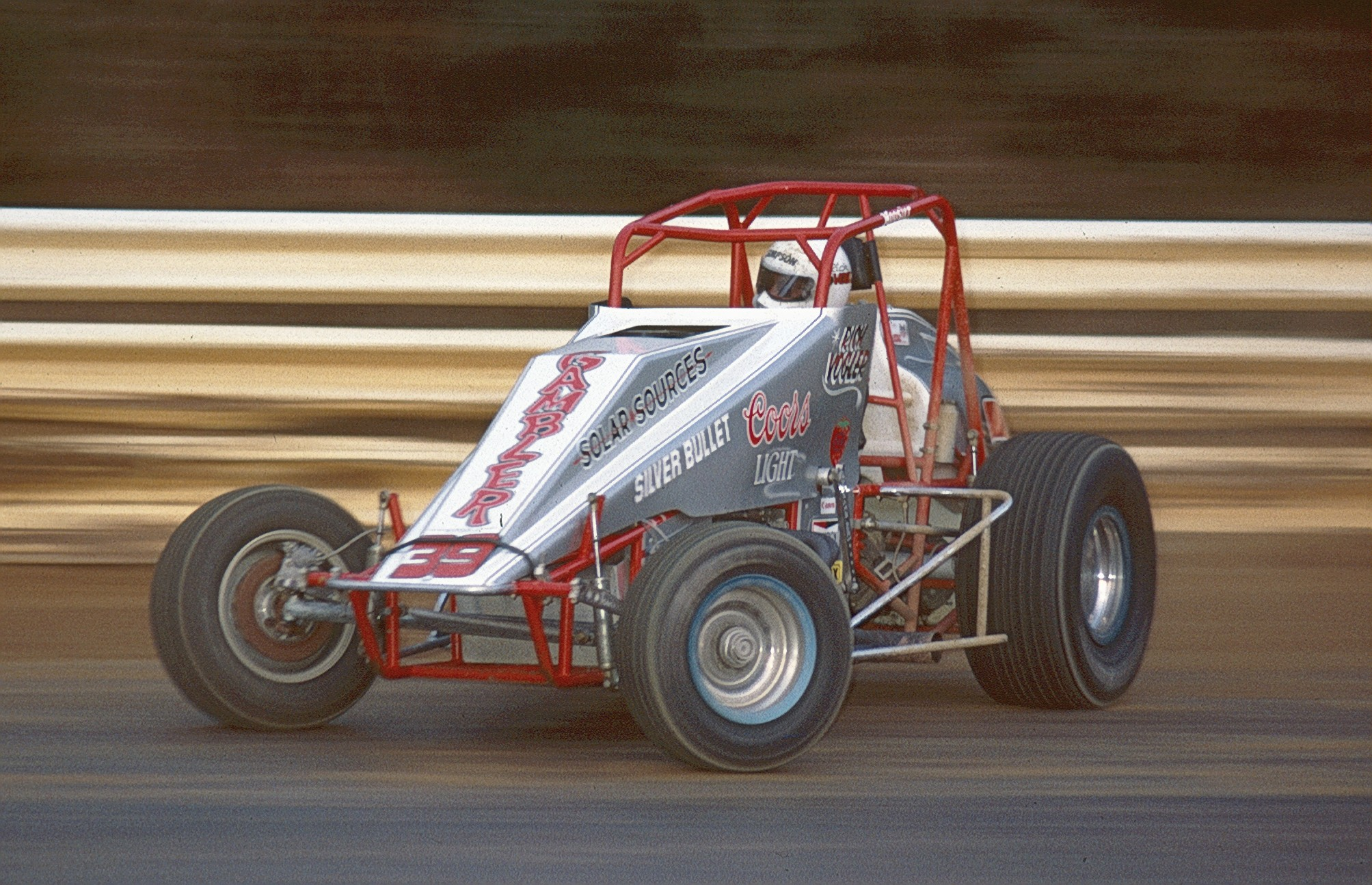
Vogler in 1986

Vogler won numerous major national events: the Hut Hundred eight times, the 4-Crown Nationals midget car event four times, the Copper Classic twice, the Hoosierdome Invitational twice, the WWRA Florida Winter Nationals in 1983, and the Night Before the 500 once. In 1987, he won the inaugural Chili Bowl Midget Nationals race.

Vogler finished seventeenth in his only NASCAR Busch Series start at the North Carolina Speedway in Rockingham in 1988.

== Career summary ==
Vogler's 134 wins (95 Midget, 35 Sprint, and four Silver Crown wins) in national events is second only to A. J. Foyt's 169. He had 170 total USAC wins, and won over two-hundred "outlaw" (non-USAC) midget races.

=== Indianapolis 500 Participation ===
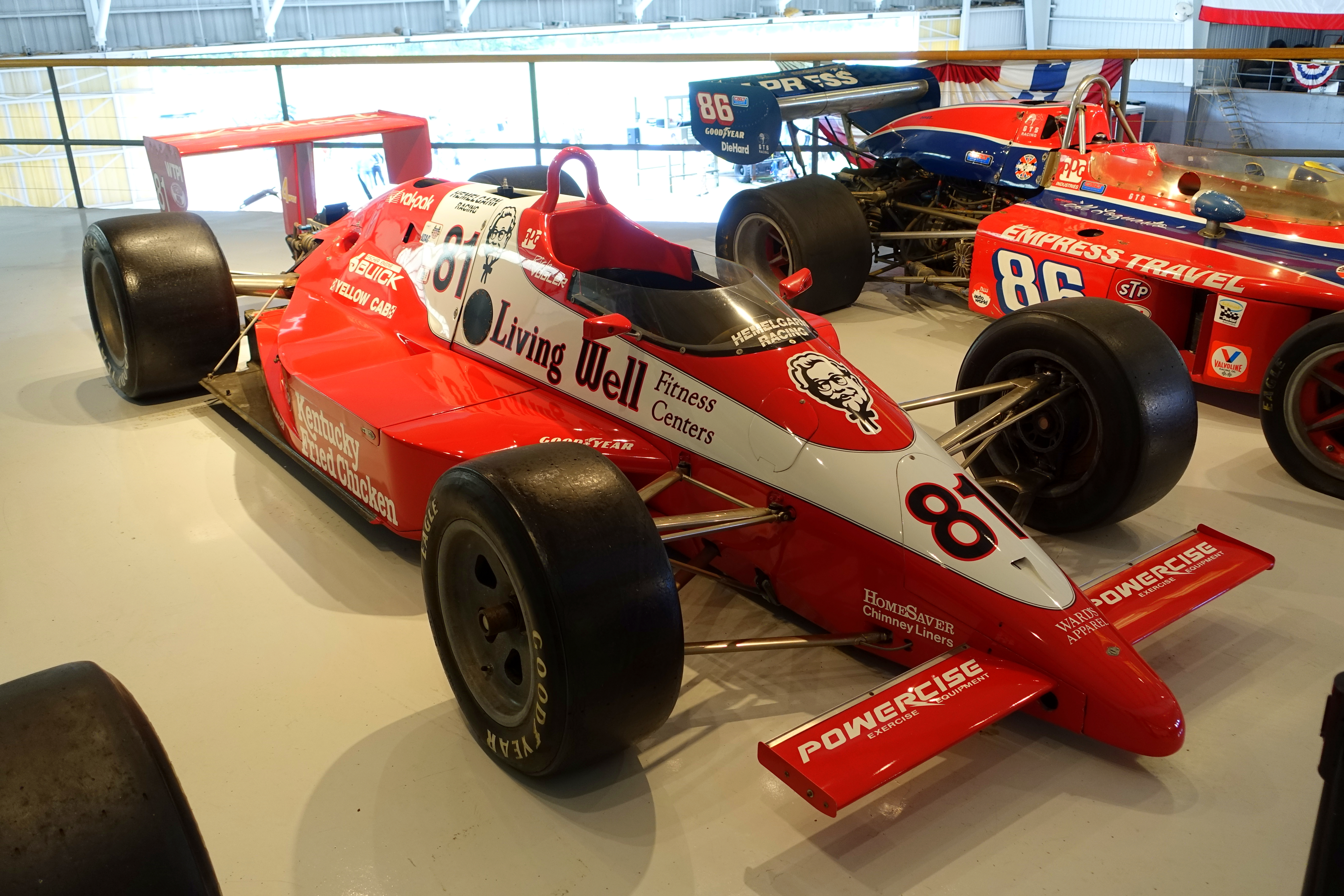
March 87C driven by Vogler in the 1987 Indianapolis 500

Vogler made his first start in Indianapolis 500 participation in 1985 where he drove the No. 60 Patrick Racing/Jonathan Byrd car to a 23rd-place finish. He would make consecutive starts at Indy from then on, up until 1990. During most of his IndyCar tenure he was sponsored by the Byrd whom he had a longtime professional relationship.

In 1988, Vogler was running over twenty laps down in the race when he waived his position to former Formula 1 champion Emerson Fittipaldi. USAC, however, did not see Vogler waive Fittipaldi by, and, as a result, they penalized Fittipaldi two laps. When Vogler got word of Fittipaldi's penalty, he went up to USAC to testify for him, calling the penalty "unjust." The following morning, in part because of Vogler's testimony, the penalty was overturned and Fittipaldi was credited with the runner-up position.

== Death ==
Days before his fortieth birthday, Vogler was competing in a nationally broadcast ESPN Thunder Joe James / Pat O'Connor Memorial sprint car event at Salem Speedway. He was leading the race at the time, when his car crashed with just over a lap to go. Vogler's helmet flew off his head and he suffered severe head injuries which killed him instantly.

Because of USAC rules on a red flag reverting to the previous completed lap, he was declared the winner of the event following his death, which was his 170th win. He was scheduled to make his NASCAR Winston Cup (now NASCAR Cup Series) series debut at Pocono Raceway the day after his fatal crash.

The Pocono race was not his first attempted NASCAR Winston Cup start: two weeks before, he entered the Michigan race but failed to qualify. At the time, Vogler was scheduled to run the full Winston Cup Series in the near-future for U.S. Racing but was replaced posthumously by Ted Musgrave.

== Memorials ==
Vogler's mother Eleanor started a college scholarship fund for aspiring Indiana students as part of Rich's concern over his sons, and the fund was started by USAC officials and sponsor Valvoline.

The first major fund-raiser for the fund was a Daytona 500 viewing party in Indianapolis which was well-attended with a silent auction and notable names in auto racing in the state as guests. Usually, his mother and his sons appear at the annual fund-raiser. In 2008, the viewing party was moved to the Indianapolis Motor Speedway, where 1996 scholarship recipient Ryan Newman won the aforementioned race.

In April 1991, Winchester Speedway began the annual season-opening Rich Vogler Classic sprint car race, usually the first race at the track each year.

There is also a Team Vogler Classic at the Indianapolis Speedrome. His father Donald Vogler died in a midget car accident at the Indianapolis Speedrome on May 1, 1981.

== Career awards ==
- He was inducted in the National Sprint Car Hall of Fame in 1992 (first eligible year).
- He was inducted in the National Midget Auto Racing Hall of Fame in 1986.
- He was inducted in the Motorsports Hall of Fame of America in 2010.

== Motorsports career results ==
=== Complete USAC Mini-Indy (Formula Super Vee) Results ===
Year	Entrant	1	2	3	4	5	6	7	8	9	10	Pos	Points
1978		PIR1	TRE1	MOS	MIL1	TEX	MIL2	OMS1; 22	OMS2	TRE2; 10	PIR2	**39th**	**33**
1979		TEX1; 2	IRP; 6	MIL1	POC; 26	TEX2	MIL2	MIN1	MIN2			**13th**	**242**

=== Complete USAC Championship Car results ===
Year	1	2	3	4	5	6	Pos	Points
1980	ONT	INDY; DNQ	MIL	POC; DNQ	MOH		-	0
1981-82	INDY; DNQ	POC	ILL; 11	DUQ; 1	ISF; 2	INDY; DNQ	8th	760
1982–83	ISF; 20	DSF; 19	NAZ; 3	INDY; DNQ			**13th**	**296**
1983-84	DUQ; 11	INDY; DNP					16th	40

=== Complete PPG Indy Car Series results ===
Year	Team	1	2	3	4	5	6	7	8	9	10	11	12	13	14	15	16	17	Pos.	Pts	Ref
1980	BFM Enterprises	ONT	INDY; DNQ	MIL	POC	MOH	MCH	WGL	MIL	ONT	MCH	MEX	PHX						-	0	
1982		PHX	ATL	MIL	CLE	MCH	MIL	POC	RIV	ROA	MCH	PHX; DNS							-	0	
1983		ATL	INDY; DNQ	MIL	CLE	MCH	ROA	POC	RIV	MOH	MCH	CPL	LAG	PHX					-	0	
1984	Morales Racing	LBH	PHX	INDY; DNQ	MIL	POR	MEA	CLE	MCH	ROA	POC	MOH	SAN	MCH	PHX	LAG	CPL		-	0	
1985	Patrick Racing	LBH	INDY; 23	MIL	POR	MEA	CLE	MCH	ROA	POC	MOH	SAN	MCH	LAG	PHX	MIA			54th	0	
1986	Alex Morales Racing	PHX	LBH	INDY; 26	MIL	POR	MEA	CLE	TOR	MCH	POC	MOH	SAN	MCH	ROA	LAG	PHX	MIA	47th	0	
1987	Hemelgarn Racing	LBH	PHX	INDY; 20	MIL	POR	MEA	CLE	TOR	MCH	POC	ROA	MOH	NAZ	LAG	MIA			43rd	0	
1988	Machinists Union Racing	PHX	LBH	INDY; 17	MIL	POR	CLE	TOR	MEA	MCH; 15	POC; 11	MOH	ROA	NAZ	LAG	MIA			32nd	2	
1989	A. J. Foyt Enterprises	PHX	LBH	INDY; 8	MIL	DET	POR	CLE	MEA	TOR									25th	5	
1989	Arciero Racing										MCH; 28	POC	MOH	ROA	NAZ	LAG			25th	5	
1990	Arciero Racing	PHX	LBH	INDY; DNQ	MIL	DET	POR	CLE	MEA	TOR	MCH	DEN	VAN	MOH	ROA	NAZ	LAG		-	0	

=== NASCAR ===
(key) (Bold – Pole position awarded by qualifying time. Italics – Pole position earned by points standings or practice time. * – Most laps led.)

==== Winston Cup Series ====
NASCAR Winston Cup Series results
Year	Team	No.	Make	1	2	3	4	5	6	7	8	9	10	11	12	13	14	15	16	17	18	19	20	21	22	23	24	25	26	27	28	29	NWCC	Pts	Ref
1990	Ray DeWitt	50	Chevy	DAY	RCH	CAR	ATL	DAR	BRI	NWS	MAR	TAL	CLT	DOV	SON	POC	MCH; DNQ	DAY	POC; 40	TAL	GLN	MCH	BRI	DAR	RCH	DOV	MAR	NWS	CLT	CAR	PHO	ATL	NA	-	

==== Busch Series ====
NASCAR Busch Series results
Year	Team	No.	Make	1	2	3	4	5	6	7	8	9	10	11	12	13	14	15	16	17	18	19	20	21	22	23	24	25	26	27	28	29	30	NBSC	Pts	Ref
1988	Bruce Lawmaster	31	Ford	DAY	HCY	CAR; 17	MAR	DAR	BRI	LNG	NZH	SBO	NSV	CLT	DOV	ROU	LAN	LVL	MYB	OXF	SBO	HCY	LNG	IRP	ROU	BRI	DAR	RCH	DOV	MAR	CLT	CAR	MAR	76th	112	
