= Phil Caliva =

Italian-born American racing driver

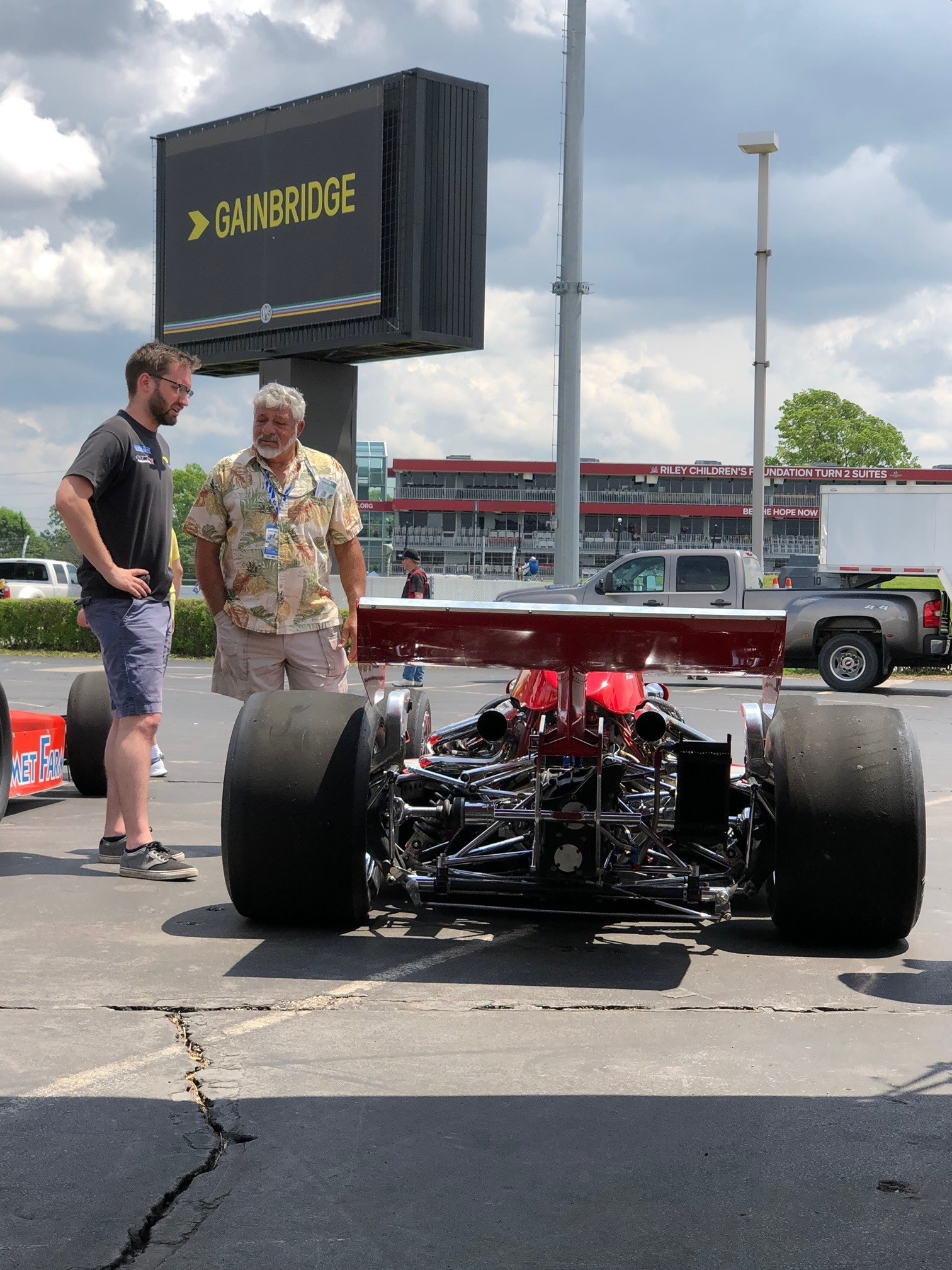
Caliva telling of his experiences at Indy to Taylor Allen at IMS in 2018. The car pictured is the "McLightning" Phil drove in his 1982 Indy 500 qualifying attempt. Dave Roberts of Carmel, IN owns the car currently.

Phil Caliva (born January 1, 1945, in Palermo, Sicily) is an Italian-born American racing driver who competed in the CART Championship Car series from 1979 to 1984. After racing in the North American Formula Super Vee series in 1977 and 1978, he made his CART debut in 1979 driving for Spike Gehlhausen at Ontario Motor Speedway. Caliva returned the next year and made five starts for Bill Alsup and tried but failed to qualify for the Indianapolis 500. Caliva attempted a second time to qualify for the "500" for Alsup in 1981 but again failed to make the field. He made three more starts later that year, including his best series finish of 8th place at the Michigan International Speedway in July. He tried three races including the Indy 500 in 1982 but failed to qualify for all of them. He tried the Indy 500 again in 1983 and missed the field again, but made the race at Riverside International Raceway in what would be his last Champ Car start. He tried the Long Beach race and the Indy 500 again in 1984 but again missed both races.

In total, Caliva made ten starts and failed to qualify or start 10 more times, including 5 failed attempts at the Indy 500. His best points finish was 22nd place in the 1981 season.

== Racing record ==
=== Complete USAC Mini-Indy Series results ===
Year	Entrant	1	2	3	4	5	6	7	8	9	10	Pos	Points
1977		TRE	MIL	MOS; 25	PIR; 9							20th	40
1978		PIR1; 15	TRE1	MOS	MIL1	TEX	MIL2; 21	OMS1; 13	OMS2	TRE2	PIR2	47th	13

=== Indy 500 results ===
Year	Chassis	Engine	Start	Finish
1980	McLaren	Offy	Failed to Qualify	
1981	McLaren	Chevrolet	Failed to Qualify	
1982	McLaren	Chevrolet	Failed to Qualify	
1983	March	Chevrolet	Failed to Qualify	
1984	March	Cosworth	Failed to Qualify	
