= Harry MacDonald (racing driver) =

Harry MacDonald (born September 27, 1940) is an American retired racing driver. He raced in the USAC Formula Super Vee series from 1977 to 1979 and in 1978 won a race at Texas World Speedway and finished third in the championship. In 1981, he attempted to qualify for the Indianapolis 500 but failed to do so, then competed in the USAC "Gold Crown" Championship Car race at Pocono Raceway where he finished fifth in a field of very few top drivers, then competed in the CART race at Michigan International Speedway and finished 21st after an engine failure. He resurfaced in 1983 to attempt to qualify for the Indy 500 but again failed to do so.

MacDonald was born in Windsor, Ontario. He was a lawyer by trade and ran a law firm in his hometown of Bloomfield Hills, Michigan.

== Racing record ==
=== SCCA National Championship Runoffs ===
| Year | Track | Car | Engine | Class | Finish | Start | Status |
|---|---|---|---|---|---|---|---|
| 1972 | Road Atlanta | Lynx | Volkswagen | Formula Vee | 7 | 10 | Running |
| 1973 | Road Atlanta | Lynx | Volkswagen | Formula Vee | 7 | 2 | Running |
| 1974 | Road Atlanta | Lynx | Volkswagen | Formula Vee | 1 | 3 | Running |

=== Complete USAC Mini-Indy Series results ===
| Year | Entrant | 1 | 2 | 3 | 4 | 5 | 6 | 7 | 8 | 9 | 10 | Pos | Points |
|---|---|---|---|---|---|---|---|---|---|---|---|---|---|
| 1977 | | TRE; 19 | MIL; 17 | MOS; 13 | PIR; 14 | | | | | | | - | - |
| 1978 | HCM Racing | PIR1; DNS | TRE1; 20 | MOS; 4 | MIL1; 3 | TEX; 1 | MIL2; 26 | OMS1; 2 | OMS2; 3 | TRE2; 23 | PIR2; 7 | 3rd | 831 |
| 1979 | | TEX1; 18 | IRP; 5 | MIL1; 9 | POC; 6 | TEX2; 7 | MIL2 | MIN1 | MIN2 | | | 10th | 284 |

== See also ==
List of Canadians in Champ Car
