= Pete Halsmer =

American racing driver (born 1944)

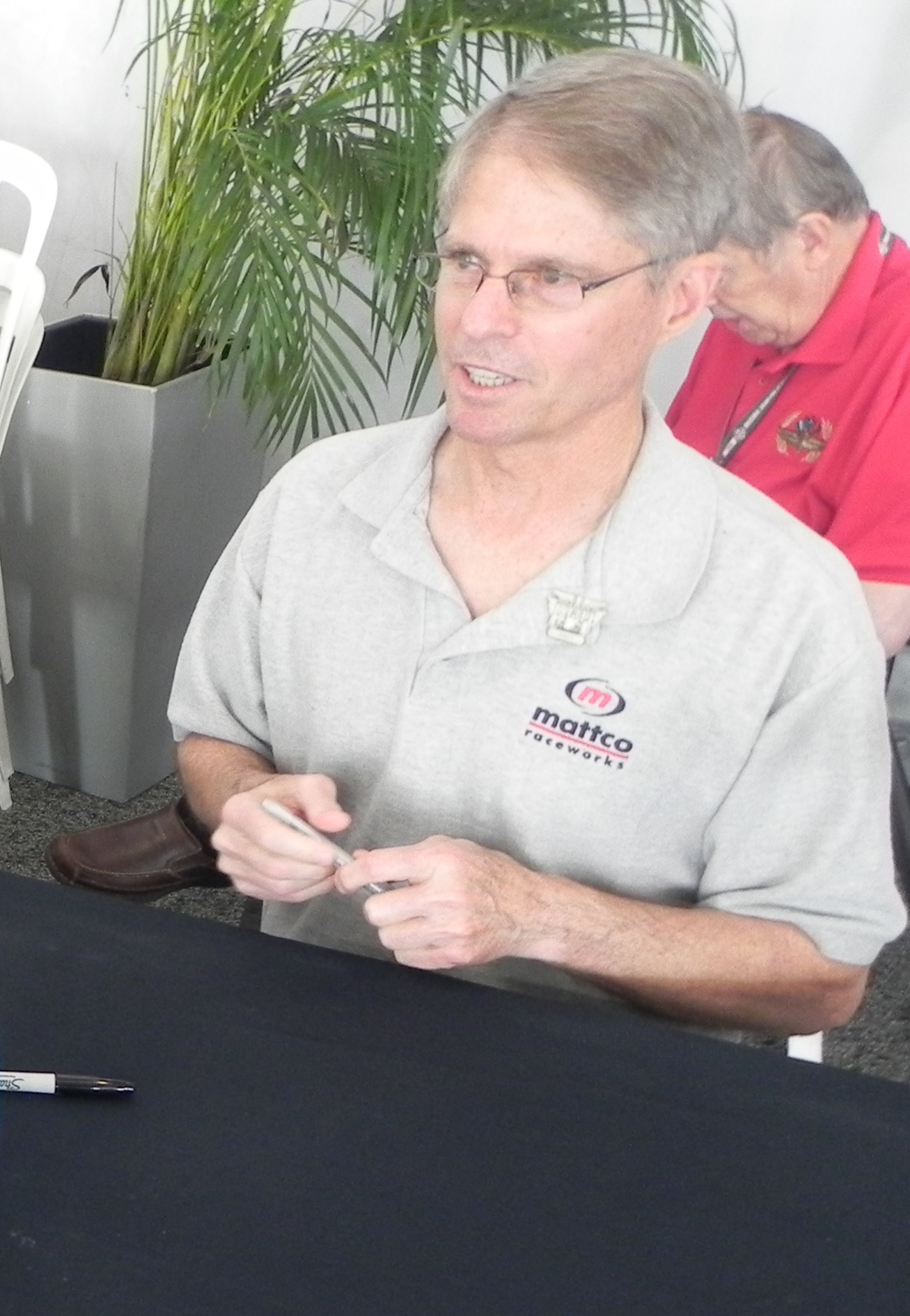
Halsmer at the 2014 Indianapolis 500

John Peter Halsmer (born March 3, 1944, in Lafayette, Indiana), is an American former racing driver best known for his success in IMSA GTO class, where he won two championships (1989, 1991) and secured multiple race victories. He claimed the 1989 GTO title while driving for Ford/Roush (under NASCAR team owner Jack Roush), winning four races, and added a second championship in 1991 with Mazda. Halsmer also achieved success across other sports car categories, including four GT2 race wins with BMW between 1994 and 1997, contributing to the Manufacturer's Title in 1996. From 1999 to 2004, he drove for and provided technical consulting to Honda America Race Team, winning several championships in the Motorola Cup and Grand-Am Cup series. He is also a three-time class winner at the 24 Hours of Daytona.

Earlier in his career, Halsmer competed in the CART series over five seasons (1980, 1982–1985), making 33 career starts and racing in the Indianapolis 500 in 1981 and 1982. He recorded three top-five finishes, with a best result of second place at Cleveland in 1983. In 1992, he also competed in the IROC, representing IMSA.

Outside of racing, Halsmer trained as a helicopter pilot and served during the Vietnam War.

== Early life and education ==
Halsmer graduated from Purdue University with degrees in industrial supervision and aviation electronics. He was drafted into the army and became a helicopter pilot. He served in Vietnam during the Vietnam War in 1970.

== Racing record ==
=== CART PPG IndyCar World Series ===
(key) (Races in bold indicate pole position)

Year	Team	Chassis	Engine	1	2	3	4	5	6	7	8	9	10	11	12	13	14	15	16	Rank	Points	Ref
1980	Wysard Racing	Wildcat	Offenhauser	ONT; 20	INDY; DNQ															36th	128	
1980	Wysard Racing	McLaren	Cosworth			MIL	POC	MOH	MCH	WGL	MIL	ONT	MCH	MEX	PHX; 6					36th	128	
1982	Arciero Racing	Eagle	Chevrolet	PHX	ATL	MIL	CLE	MCH	MIL	POC	RIV; 24	ROA; 19	MCH	PHX; 24						43rd	2	
1983	Arciero Racing	Penske	Cosworth	ATL; 4	INDY; DNQ	MIL; 9	CLE; 2	MCH; 33	ROA; 14	POC; 14	RIV; 27	MOH; 24	MCH; 14	CPL; 5	LAG; 20	PHX; 7				11th	48	
1984	Arciero Racing	Penske	Cosworth	LBH; 8	PHX; 14	INDY; DNQ	MIL; DNQ													29th	9	
1984	Arciero Racing	March	Cosworth					POR; 22	MEA; 26	CLE			POC; 18	MOH; 13	SAN; 24	MCH; 18	PHX; 18	LAG; 26		29th	9	
1984	Arciero Racing	Arciero	Cosworth																CPL; 9	29th	9	
1984	Curb-All American Racers	Eagle	Pontiac								MCH; 14	ROA								29th	9	
1985	Machinists Union Racing	March	Cosworth	LBH	INDY; DNQ	MIL; 15	POR; 8	MEA; 19	CLE	MCH	ROA	POC	MOH	SAN	MCH; 11	LAG	PHX	MIA		32nd	**7**	

=== Indianapolis 500 ===
Year	Chassis	Engine	Start	Finish	Team
1981	Penske	Cosworth	24	24	Arciero Racing
1982	Eagle	Chevrolet	32	25	Arciero Racing

=== SCCA National Championship Runoffs ===
Year	Track	Car	Engine	Class	Finish	Start	Status
1974	Road Atlanta	Brabham BT29	Cosworth	Formula B	15	9	Retired

(key) (Races in bold indicate pole position, races in italics indicate fastest race lap)

=== Complete USAC Mini-Indy Series results ===
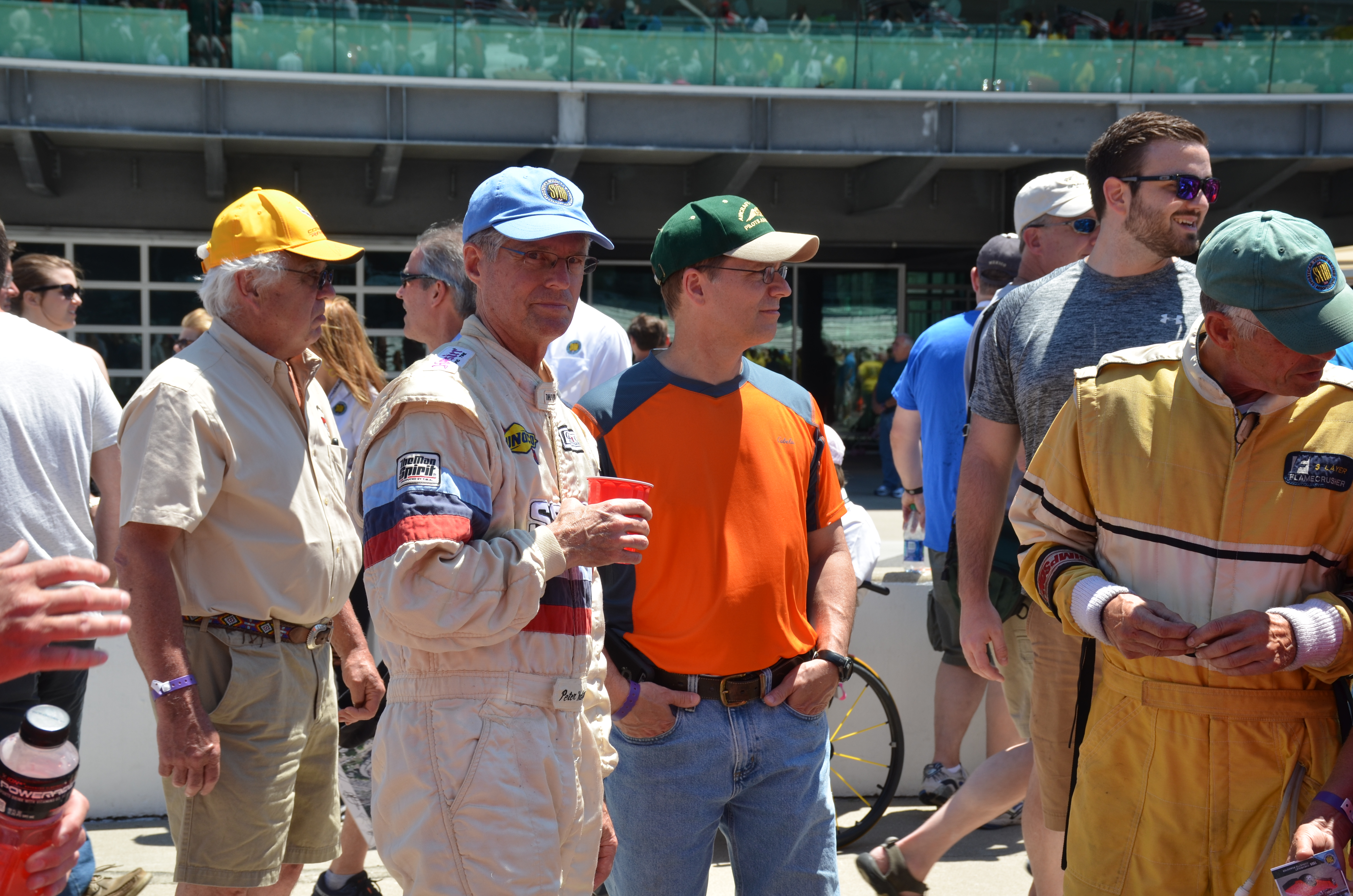
Halsmer at the 2016 Brickyard SVRA Pro-Am race at the Indianapolis Motor Speedway

Year	Entrant	1	2	3	4	5	6	7	8	9	10	Pos	Points
1977	Race Research Inc.	TRE	MIL	MOS	PIR; 3							**12th**	**140**
1978	Simpson Racers	PIR1; 4	TRE1; 9	MOS; 6	MIL1; 21	TEX; 24	MIL2; 15	OMS1; 10	OMS2; 10	TRE2; 19	PIR2; 23	**12th**	**318**
1979		TEX1; 4	IRP; 9	MIL1; 8	POC; 8	TEX2; 12	MIL2; 5	MIN1; 4	MIN2; 2			**4th**	**650**
1980	Frank Arciero	MIL; 3	POC; 2	MOH; 23	MIN1; 4	MIN2; 14	ONT; 1					**2nd**	**628**
