= Dennis Firestone =

Australian CART driver

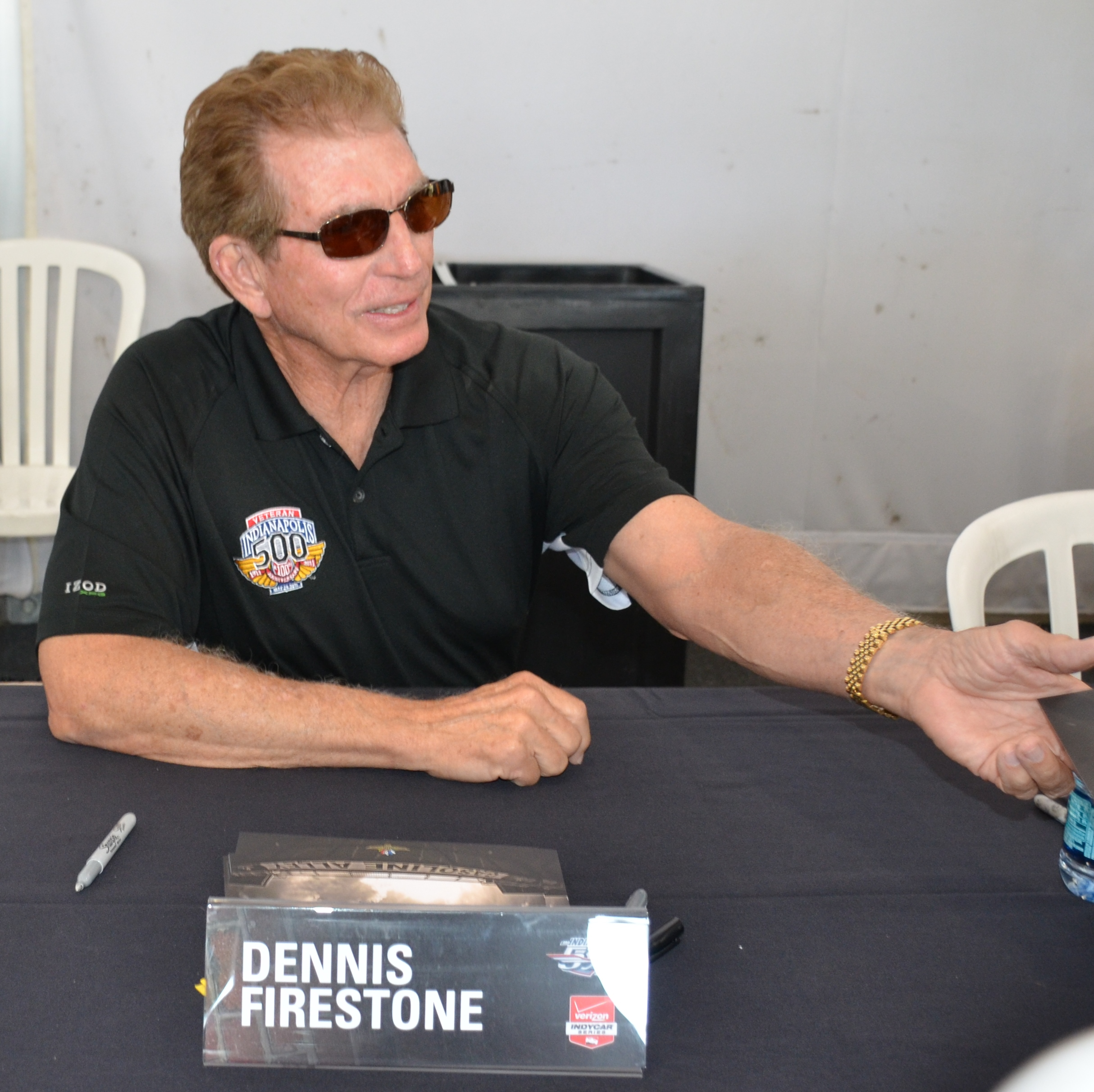
- Nationality: Australian (Australia)
- Born: 22 July 1944 (age 82) Townsville, Australia
- Debut season: 1979
- Starts: 34
- Wins: 0
- Poles: 0
- Fastest laps: 0
- Best finish: 12th in 1980

Awards
- 1980: CART IndyCar Rookie of the Year

Dennis Firestone (born 22 July 1944 in Townsville, Australia) is a former CART driver who raced from 1979 to 1987. He was the 1980 CART Rookie of the Year in finishing 12th in season points, his best season. His best finish in a CART race was a pair of fifth places that season. He made five starts at the Indianapolis 500 with a best finish of tenth in 1981. An accident at Indianapolis in 1987 resulted in a broken neck and ended his racing career.

Since his driving days, Firestone has run a California trucking company, and participates in vintage racing events.

== American Open Wheel racing results ==
=== SCCA National Championship Runoffs ===
Year	Track	Car	Engine	Class	Finish	Start	Status
1973	Road Atlanta	Titan	Ford	Formula Ford	24	9	Retired
1974	Road Atlanta	ADF Mk. 2	Ford	Formula Ford	4	5	Running
1976	Road Atlanta	Crosslé 30F	Ford	Formula Ford	1	3	Running
1976	Road Atlanta	March	Cosworth	Formula B	8	9	Running
1977	Road Atlanta	Crosslé 32F	Ford	Formula Ford	3	17	Running
1979	Road Atlanta	Crosslé	Ford	Formula Ford	21	12	Retired
1981	Road Atlanta	Crosslé 50F	Ford	Formula Ford	2		Running
1982	Road Atlanta	Crosslé 50F	Ford	Formula Ford	6		Running

=== Complete USAC Mini-Indy Series results ===
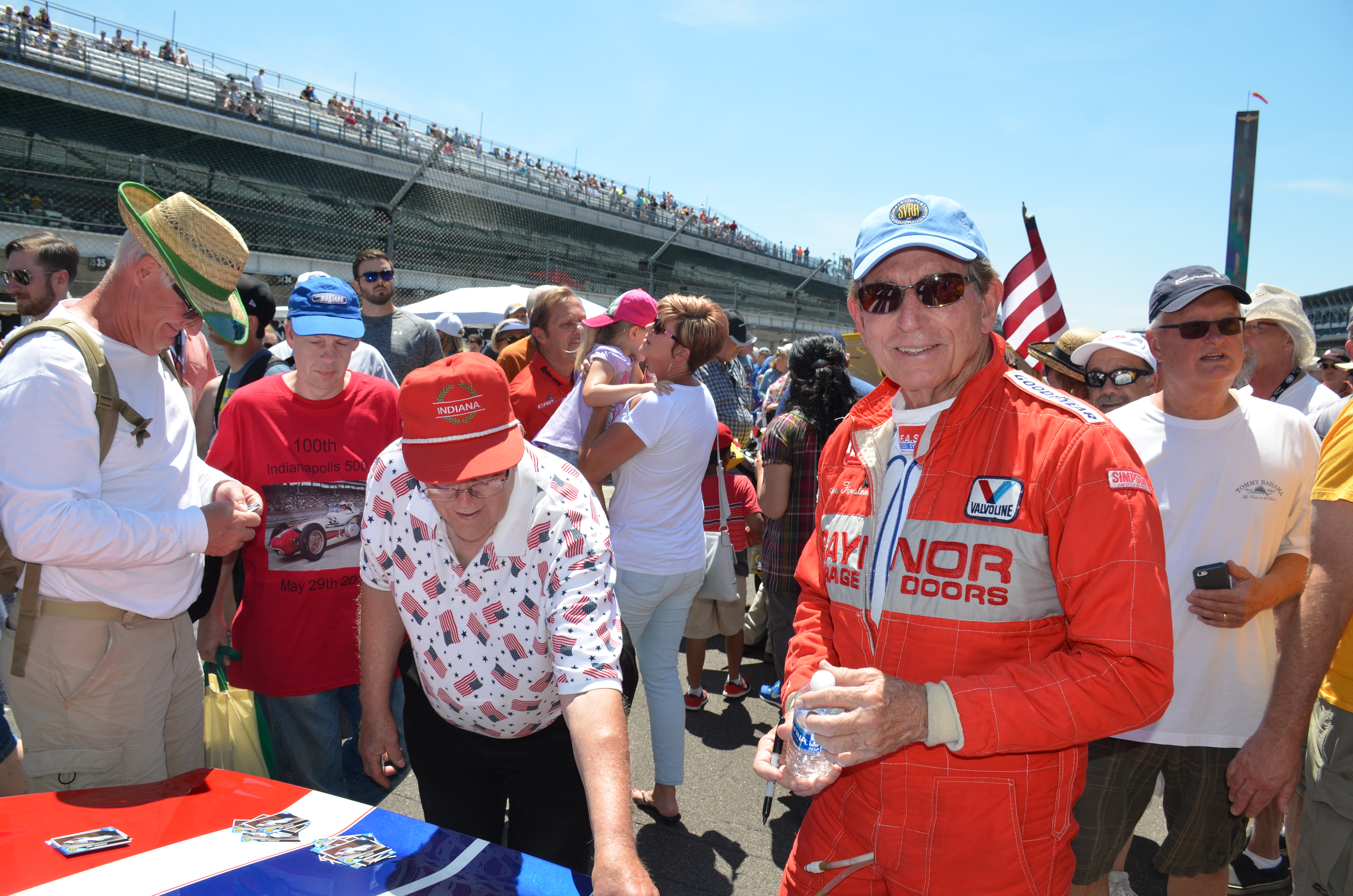
Dennis Firestone at the 2016 Brickyard SVRA Pro-Am race at the Indianapolis Motor Speedway.

Year	Entrant	1	2	3	4	5	6	7	8	9	10	Pos	Points
1978	Crosslé Cars Pacific	PIR1; 5	TRE1; 24	MOS; 3	MIL1; 22	TEX; 6	MIL2; 1	OMS1; 24	OMS2; 1	TRE2; 16	PIR2; 2	**2nd**	**894**
1979		TEX1; 1	IRP; 2	MIL1; 1	POC; 2	TEX2; 2	MIL2; 1	MIN1; 1	MIN2; 1			**1st**	**1480**

=== American Super Vee Championship ===
- 1978 – 17th
- 1979 – 9th
- 1980 – 16th

=== USAC Gold Crown Championship ===
- 1981–82 – 24th
- 1983–84 – 15th

=== PPG Indycar Series ===
(key) (Races in bold indicate pole position)

Year	Team	1	2	3	4	5	6	7	8	9	10	11	12	13	14	15	16	17	Rank	Points	Ref
1979	AMS Oil	PHX	ATL	ATL	INDY	TRE	TRE	MCH	MCH	WGL	TRE	ONT; 31	MCH	ATL	PHX				NC	0	
1980	Scientific Drilling	ONT	INDY; 16	MIL	POC; 30	MDO	MCH; 14	WGL	MIL	ONT; 6	MCH; DNS	MEX; 5	PHX; 5						12th	743	
1981	Rhoades Racing	PHX	MIL	ATL; 18	ATL	MCH	RIV	MIL	MCH	WGL	MEX	PHX							44th	1	
1982	BVC Racing	PHX; 20	ATL	MIL	CLE	MCH	MIL	POC	RIV	ROA	MCH	PHX							44th	1	
1983	Simpson Sports	ATL	INDY; 24	MIL	CLE	MCH	ROA	POC	RIV	MDO	MCH	CPL	LAG	PHX					NC	0	
1984	Hoosier Transportation	LBH	PHX	INDY; 12	MIL	POR	MEA	CLE											39th	1	
1984	Pace Electronics								MCH; DNQ	ROA; 17	POC; 26	MDO	SAN; 16	MCH	PHX	LAG; DNQ	CPL; 21		39th	1	
1985	Pace Racing	LBH; 22	INDY; DNQ	MIL; 20	POR; 18	MEA; DNQ	CLE; 21	MCH; 11	ROA; 20	POC; 9	MDO; 17	SAN; 14	MCH; DNS	LAG; 23	PHX	MIA			33rd	6	
1986	Pace Racing	PHX	LBH	INDY; Wth^{1}	MIL	POR	MEA	CLE	TOR	MCH; 17	POC; 28	MDO	SAN; 14	MCH; 14	ROA	LAG	PHX; 17	MIA	40th	0	
1987	Raynor Garage Door	LBH; 21	PHX; 7	INDY; DNQ	MIL	POR	MEA	CLE	TOR	MCH	POC	ROA	MDO	NAZ	LAG	MIA			31st	6	

^{1} Wrecked after qualifying

=== Indy 500 results ===
Year	Chassis	Engine	Start	Finish
1980	Penske	Cosworth	24th	16th
1981	Wildcat	Cosworth	28th	10th
1982	Eagle	Milodon	21st	27th
1983	March	Cosworth	33rd	24th
1984	March	Cosworth	32nd	12th
1985	March	Cosworth	Failed to Qualify	DNQ
1986	Lola	Cosworth	Withdrew*	N/A
1987	Lola	Cosworth	Practice Crash	DNQ

- Firestone qualified for the 1986 race, but was forced to withdraw from the field after a serious crash totalled the car during the final Carburetion Day practice.

Sporting positions
Preceded by Bill Alsup	USAC Mini-Indy; 1979	Succeeded by Peter Kuhn
Preceded by Bill Alsup	CART Rookie of the Year; 1980	Succeeded by Bob Lazier
