= Dick Ferguson =

American racing driver

Dick Ferguson (March 16, 1949 – September 26, 2010) was a driver in the CART Championship Car series, and stunt driver in Hollywood.

Ferguson was born in New York City. He was raised in Glendale, California, where his father worked in the machine shop at the Jet Propulsion Laboratory. Ferguson served in the Air Force for two years, stationed in the Philippines. He worked as a car mechanic, specializing in Ferraris.

Ferguson raced in the 1979–1985 and 1987–1988 seasons, with 26 career starts, including the 1980 Indianapolis 500. He finished in the top-ten five times, with a best finish of 6th position in 1981 at Michigan. Away from the track, Ferguson did stunt driving in Hollywood, and co-owned a company that placed exotic cars in commercials. He died from prostate cancer in 2010, in Los Angeles, at the age of 61.

== Racing record ==
=== SCCA National Championship Runoffs ===
Year	Track	Car	Engine	Class	Finish	Start	Status
1973	Road Atlanta	Lola T200	Ford	Formula Ford	11	8	Running
1974	Road Atlanta	Phantom	Ford	Formula Ford	21	11	Retired

=== Complete USAC Mini-Indy Series results ===
Year	Entrant	1	2	3	4	5	6	7	8	9	10	Pos	Points
1978	Race Research Inc.	PIR1; 24	TRE1	MOS; 13	MIL1; 25	TEX	MIL2	OMS1	OMS2	TRE2	PIR2; 10	37th	40
