= Herm Johnson =

American racing driver (1953–2016)

Herman Austin Johnson (March 4, 1953 – December 10, 2016), was a driver in the CART Indy Car series, born in Eau Claire, Wisconsin. He raced in seven seasons (1979–1985), with 35 career starts. He drove in the Indianapolis 500 in 1982 and 1984. He finished in the top-ten eight times, with his best finish in sixth position in 1982 at Atlanta.

In 1976, Johnson won the SCCA National Championship at Road Atlanta and was the 1977 USAC Mini-Indy Champion. Johnson had two serious pit fires in 1981 roughly a month apart from each other. Johnson's father suffered a fatal heart attack, just days before the 1982 Indianapolis 500. Also during this race, Rick Mears bumped into the back of his car on a lap 183 pit stop. For his next race Johnson, who ran a business painting helmets, trimmed the back edge of his rear wing with the message "Rick...if you can read this, you're too close."

Johnson suffered a serious crash in practice for the 1986 Indianapolis 500. Johnson suffered injuries to his back and neck, and the crash effectively ended his Indy car driving career. After his recovery, Johnson was known to occasionally compete in sports car and ice racing events.

Johnson resided in Eau Claire, running 'Just Herm Designs', a custom painting business. The shop specialized in custom paint jobs for helmets, race cars, and motorcycles, doing work for several Indy 500 winners, IndyCar, and NHRA Champions, as well as amateur racers.

Johnson also served as a performance driving instructor at Brainerd International Raceway in Brainerd, Minnesota, as well as driving demonstrations for new automotive product launches.

On December 10, 2016, Johnson died from liver and renal failure.

== Racing record ==
=== SCCA National Championship Runoffs ===
Year	Track	Car	Engine	Class	Finish	Start	Status
1975	Road Atlanta	Lola T324	Volkswagen	Formula Super Vee	2	2	Running
1976	Road Atlanta	Lola T324	Volkswagen	Formula Super Vee	1	3	Running

=== Complete USAC Mini-Indy Series results ===
Year	Entrant	1	2	3	4	5	6	7	8	9	10	Pos	Points
1977	Austin Johnson	TRE; 16	MIL; 2	MOS; 3	PIR; 1							1st	500
1978	Austin Johnson	PIR1; 16	TRE1; 5	MOS; 14	MIL1; 2	TEX; 7	MIL2; 5	OMS1; 5	OMS2; 22	TRE2; 3	PIR2; 5	4th	773
1979		TEX1	IRP	MIL1	POC	TEX2	MIL2	MIN1; 19	MIN2; 11			30th	24

=== Complete CART Indy Car Series results ===
Year	Entrant	1	2	3	4	5	6	7	8	9	10	11	12	13	14	15	16	17	Pos	Points	Ref
1979	Mergard Racing	PHX	ATL	ATL	INDY	TRT	TRT	MIC	MIC	WGL	TRT	ONT	MIC	ATL; 7	PHX; 13				24th	98	
1980	Menard Racing	ONT; 14	INDY; DNQ	MIL; 17	POC; 11	MDO	MIC	WGL	MIL; 11	ONT; 13	MIC; 13	MXS; 14	PHX; 8						24th	272	
1981	Menard Racing	PHX	MIL; 22	ATL; 22		MIC; 33	RIR; 7	MIL; 13	MIC	WTG; 9	MXC; 8	PHX; 9							17th	38	
1981	Cannon Racing				ATL; 17														17th	38	
1982		PHX; 19	ATL; 6	MIL; 23	CLE; 13	MIC; 34	MIL; 16	POC	RIV; 22	ROA; 17	MIC	PHX							26th	24	
1983		ATL	INDY; DNQ	MIL	CLE; 16	MIC; 24	ROA; DNQ	POC	RIV	MDO; 17	MIC	CPL	LAG	PHX					42nd	0	
1984	Menard Racing	LBH	PHX	INDY; 8	MIL; 18	POR	MEA	CLE	MIC	ROA	POC								32nd	5	
1984	Pace Racing											MDO; 23							32nd	5	
1984	Jet Engineering												SAN; DNQ	MIC	PHX	LAG	CPL		32nd	5	
1985	Menard Cashway Lumber	LBH	INDY; DNQ	MIL	POR	MEA	CLE	MIC											39th	1	
1985	Leader Card Racing								ROA; 12	POC	MDO; 24	SAN	MIC	LAG	PHX	MIA			39th	1	
1986	Team Menard	PHX	LBH	INDY; DNQ	MIL	POR	MEA	CLE	TOR	MIC	POC	MDO	SAN	MIC	ROA	LAG	PHX	MIA	NC	-	

=== Indianapolis 500 results ===
Year	Chassis	Engine	Start	Finish
1980	Lightning	Offy	Failed to Qualify	
1981	Lightning	Chevrolet	Failed to Qualify	
1982	Eagle	Chevrolet	14th	9th
1983	March	Chevrolet	Failed to Qualify	
1984	March	Cosworth	9th	8th
1985	March	Cosworth	Failed to Qualify	
1986	March	Cosworth	Practice Crash	
