= Bill Alsup =

American open-wheel racing driver (1938–2016)

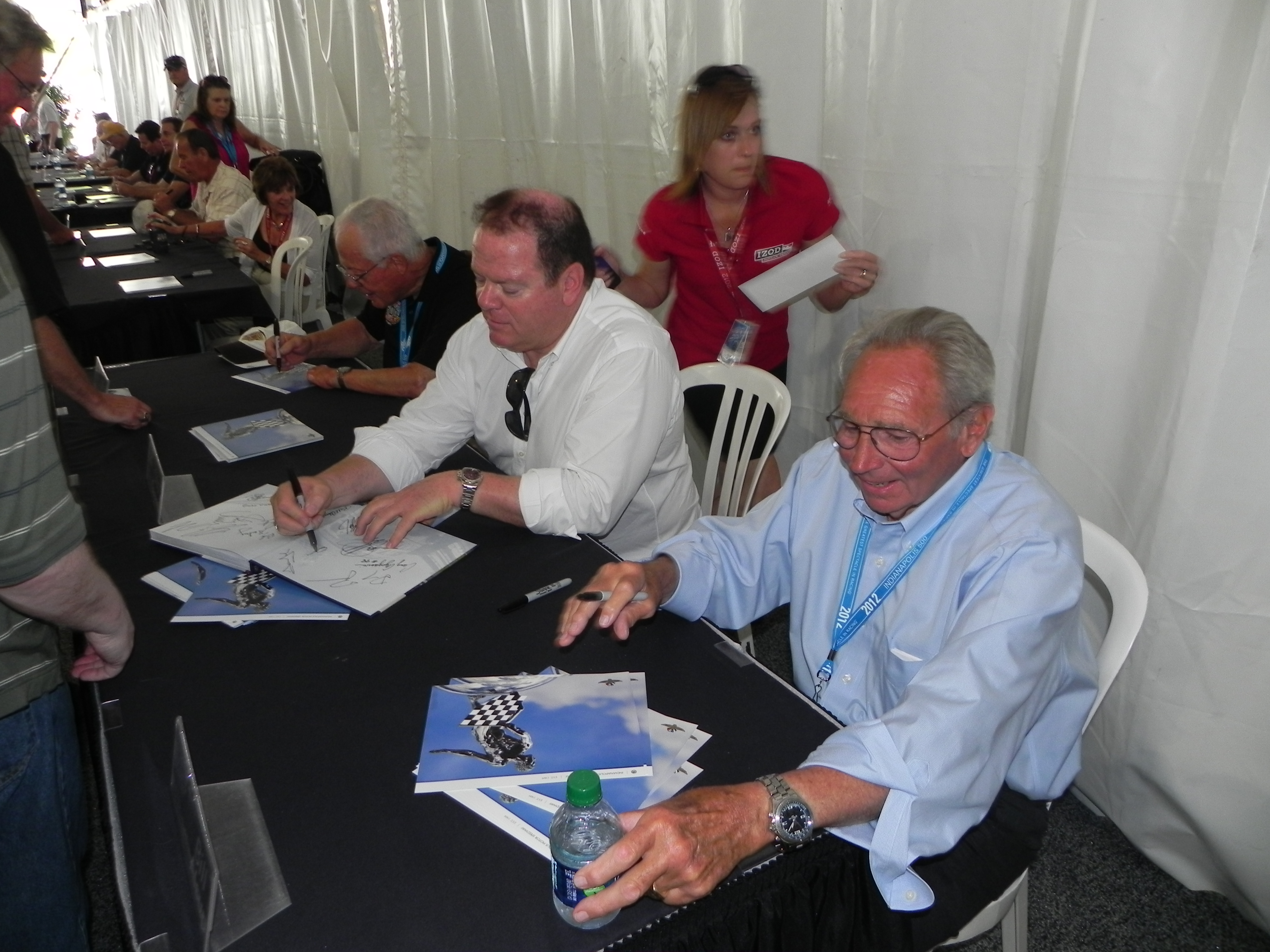
Indy driver Bill Alsup (right) at the 2012 Indianapolis 500 Legends Day

Bill Alsup (July 15, 1938 in Honolulu – August 9, 2016) was an American race car driver. He was the first Championship Auto Racing Teams (CART) Rookie of the Year in 1979 and competed in the 1981 Indianapolis 500, finishing 11th. He made 57 CART & USAC Champ Car starts in his career. His best race finish of third came three times and he was the 1981 CART Championship runner-up, putting in a winless but consistent season for Penske Racing, his only effort with a top-level team. He returned to his own team the next year and struggled until leaving Champ Car following the 1984 Sanair Super Speedway race.

== CART career ==
Alsup made his CART debut at the Arizona Republic/Jimmy Bryan 150 at Phoenix International Raceway driving the No. 41 WASP Racing Mclaren-Offenhauser for WASP Racing starting twenty fourth (last) and finishing eleventh. He attempted to qualify for the Indianapolis 500, first driving the #67 WASP Racing McLaren-Offenhauser, but the car was not fast enough to make a qualifying run. He then attempted the No. 19 Sta-On Eagle 74-Offenhauser for Gehlhausen Racing but the engine failed. The final car he attempted to qualify was the No. 68 CAM 2 Motor Oil Penske PC7-Cosworth DFX for Team Penske. He qualified for the race but USAC officials ruled that the car used the engine from Penske teammate Bobby Unser's car and Alsup was disqualified. He drove the remainder of the CART season for WASP Racing. He had a best finish of ninth in the second heat of the Trenton Indy at Trenton Speedway, the Kent Oil 150 at Watkins Glen International, the first heat of the Norton Twin 125s and the Gould Grand Prix, the latter two at Michigan International Speedway, and finished the season fifteenth in points to win the first CART Rookie of the Year Award.

In 1980, Alsup purchased the inventory of WASP Racing and started his own team called Alsup Racing, Alsup driving the No. 41 Polaroid Time Zero Penske PC7-Cosworth DFX. He started the season by finishing sixth in the season opening Dastun Twin 200 at Ontario Motor Speedway. He failed to qualify for the Indianapolis 500, rebounded to finish third at the Red Roof Inns 150 at Mid-Ohio Sports Car Course, and finished the season seventh in points, earning him the CART Most Improved Driver Award.

In 1981, Alsup drove for Team Penske in a Norton-Spirit sponsored car alongside teammates Bobby Unser and Rick Mears. Driving for Penske in the No. 7 A.B. Dick Penske PC9B-Cosworth DFX and for himself in the #41 Polaroid Time Zero Penske PC7-Cosworth DFX he had a best finish of third at the Norton Michigan 500 at Michigan International Speedway where he led for three laps. He also finished third at the Los Angeles Times 500 at Riverside International Raceway and at the AB Dick Tony Bettenhausen 200 at Wisconsin State Fairgrounds Park Speedway. He ended the season with a career best second in points in the CART standings but it wasn't enough to keep his ride with TEAM Penske, and he was released from the team at the end of the season.

In 1982, Alsup was back to driving for himself using the No. 2 A.B. Dick Penske PC9B-Cosworth DFX and had a best finish of fourth at the Stroh's 200 at Atlanta Motor Speedway. He dropped to eleventh in points for the season.

In 1983, Alsup began working with Argo Racing Cars driving the No. 11 Alsup Racing/Indy Car Annual Argo JM-15-Cosworth DFX. He failed to qualify for the Indianapolis 500 and soon started driving a March 83C-Cosworth DFX. He scored no points that year.

In 1984, Alsup switched between a March 83C-Cosworth DFX and an Argo JM-15-Cosworth DFX. He failed to qualify for the Indianapolis 500 and started his last race at the Molson Indy Montreal at Sanair Super Speedway. He once again failed to score points.

== Death ==
Alsup died in a crane accident near Silverton, Colorado where he was a long-term resident on August 9, 2016.

== Racing record ==
=== SCCA National Championship Runoffs ===
Year	Track	Car	Engine	Class	Finish	Start	Status
1973	Road Atlanta	Caldwell	Ford	Formula Ford	15	19	Running

=== Complete USAC Mini-Indy Series results ===
Year	Entrant	1	2	3	4	5	6	7	8	9	10	Pos	Points
1977	Bill Alsup	TRE; 7	MIL; 14	MOS; 7	PIR; 2							5th	280
1978	William Alsup, Jr.	PIR1; 21	TRE1; 2	MOS; 1	MIL1; 23	TEX; 2	MIL2; 10	OMS1; 1	OMS2; 2	TRE2; 4	PIR2; 12	1st	1046

=== Formula Super Vee ===
Year	Team	Chassis	Engine	1	2	3	4	5	6	7	8	Rank	Points
1978	Bill Alsup	Argo JM2	VW Brabham	CLT; 1	RAL; 1	MOH; Ret	CMT; 1	WG1; 1	BRN; 3	ROA; 4	WG2; 3	1st	114

=== SCCA/CART Indy Car Series ===
Year	Team	Chassis	Engine	1	2	3	4	5	6	7	8	9	10	11	12	13	14	15	16	Rank	Points	Ref
1979	WASP Racing	McLaren	Offenhauser	PHX; 11	ATL; 16	ATL; 15	INDY; DNQ	TRT; 12	TRT; 9	MIC; 9	MIC; 13	WGL; 9	TRT; 10	ONT; 22	MIC; 9	ATL; 10	PHX; 11			15th	400	
1979	Gehlhausen Racing	McLaren	Cosworth				INDY; DNQ													15th	400	
1979	Team Penske	Penske	Cosworth				INDY; DNQ													15th	400	
1980	Alsup Racing	Penske	Cosworth	ONT; 7	INDY; DNQ	MIL; 9	POC; 4	MOH; 3	MIC; 10	WGL; 8	MIL; 21	ONT; 16	MIC; 10	MXS; 16	PHX; 21					7th	1,214	
1981	Alsup Racing	Penske	Cosworth	PHX; 5	MIL						MIC; 4	WTG; 3								2nd	175	
1981	Team Penske	Penske	Cosworth			ATL; 8	ATL; 8	MIC; 4	RIR; 3	MIL; 11			MXC; 5	PHX; 17						2nd	175	
1982	Alsup Racing	Penske	Cosworth	PHX; 11	ATL; 5	MIL; 16	CLE; 12	MIC; 13	MIL; 9	POC; 13	RIV; 8	ROA; 16	MIC; 6	PHX; 8						11th	70	
1983	Alsup Racing	March Argo	Cosworth	ATL; DNS	INDY; DNQ	MIL; 21	CLE; 20	MIC; 16	ROA	POC; 20	RIV	MOH; 19	MIC; 22	CPL	LAG; 27	PHX; 14				38th	0	
1984	Alsup Racing	March Argo	Cosworth	LBH; DNQ	PHX; DNQ	INDY; DNQ	MIL	POR	MEA	CLE; DNQ	MIC; 16	ROA	POC; 24	MOH	SAN; 14	MIC	PHX	LAG	CPL	40th	0	

Sporting positions
Preceded by Bob Lazier	US Formula Super Vee; Champion; 1978	Succeeded by Geoff Brabham
Preceded by Tom Bagley	USAC Mini-Indy Series; Champion; 1978	Succeeded by Dennis Firestone
Preceded by None	CART Rookie of the Year; 1979	Succeeded by Dennis Firestone
