= 1981 Indianapolis 500 =

American motor race

65th Indianapolis 500
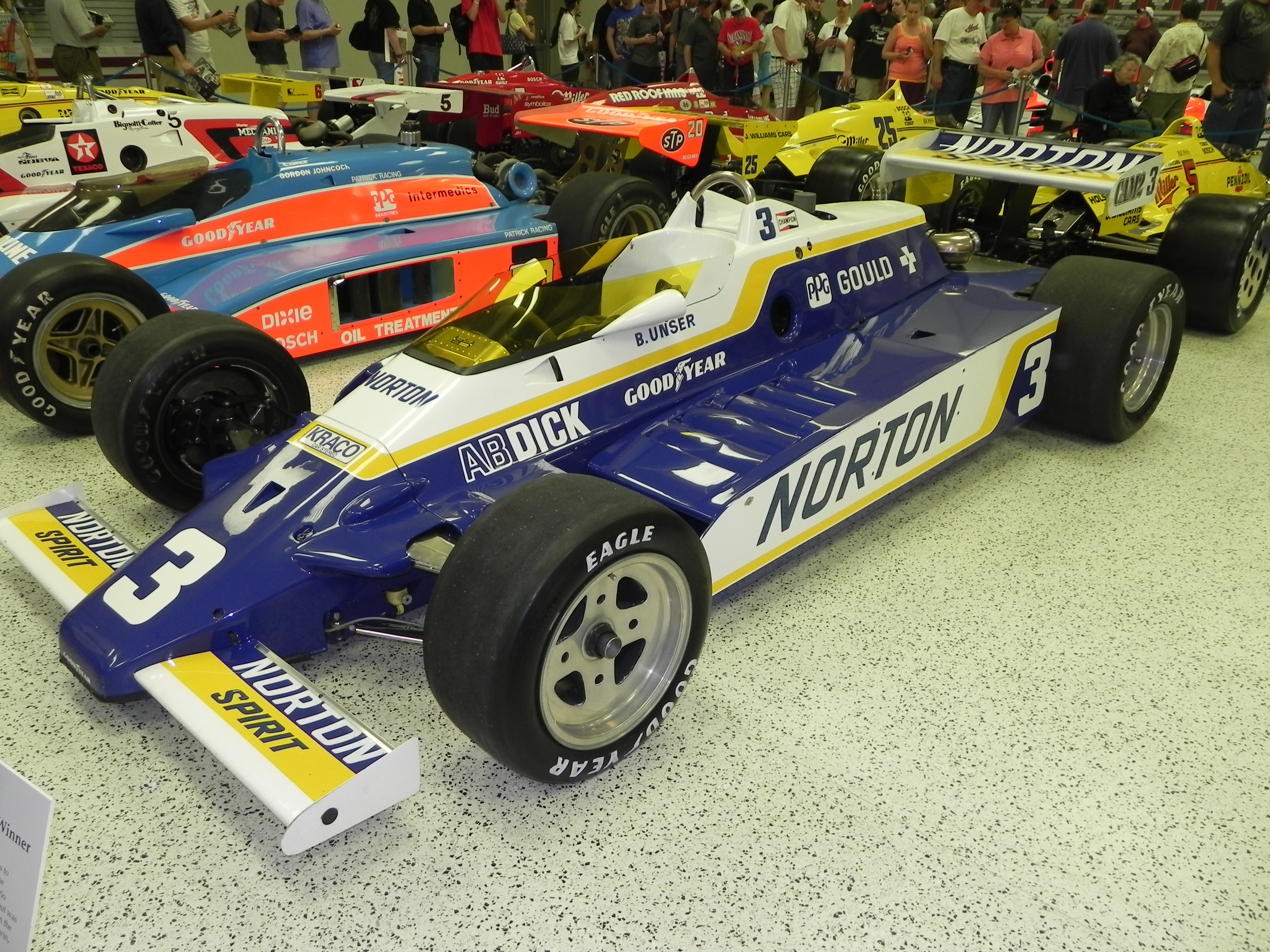

Indianapolis Motor Speedway

Indianapolis 500
- Sanctioning body: USAC
- Season: 1981–82 USAC season 1981 CART season
- Date: May 24, 1981
- Winner: (United States) Bobby Unser
- Winning team: Penske Racing
- Winning Chief Mechanic: Laurie Gerrish
- Time of race: 3:35:41.78
- Average speed: 139.084 mph (223.834 km/h)
- Pole position: (United States) Bobby Unser
- Pole speed: 200.546 mph (322.748 km/h)
- Fastest qualifier: (United States) Tom Sneva (200.691 mph)
- Rookie of the Year: (Mexico) Josele Garza
- Most laps led: (United States) Bobby Unser (89)

Pre-race ceremonies
- National anthem: Purdue band
- "Back Home Again in Indiana": Phil Harris
- Starting command: Mari George
- Pace car: Buick Regal
- Pace car driver: Duke Nalon
- Starter: Duane Sweeney
- Estimated attendance: 350,000

Television in the United States
- Network: ABC
- Announcers: Host: Dave Diles; Lap-by-lap: Jim McKay; Color Analyst: Jackie Stewart
- Nielsen ratings: 12.8 / 24

Chronology
Previous	Next
1980	1982

The 65th Indianapolis 500 was held at the Indianapolis Motor Speedway in Speedway, Indiana, on Sunday, May 24, 1981. The race is widely considered one of the most controversial races in Indy history. Bobby Unser took the checkered flag as the winner, with Mario Andretti finishing second. After the conclusion of the race, USAC officials ruled that Unser had passed cars illegally while exiting the pit area during a caution on lap 149 (of 200). Unser was subsequently issued a one-position penalty. The next morning, the official race results were posted, and Unser was dropped to second place. Andretti was elevated to first place and declared the race winner.

Controversy followed the ruling. After a lengthy protest and appeals process, the penalty was rescinded, and Unser was reinstated the victory on October 8. Officially, it became Unser's third-career Indy 500 victory and his final win in Indy car competition. Unser stepped out of the car at the end of the season, and ultimately retired from driving. The race was officially part of the 1981–82 USAC season; however, most of the top entrants participated in the 1981 CART PPG Indy Car World Series. Championship points for the 1981 Indy 500 were not awarded towards the CART title and the race was considered a non-championship race for that series.

The hectic month of May 1981 was interrupted several times by rain. Pole qualifying stretched over three days due to inclement weather, and several days of practice were cut short or lost due to rain. The 1981 race is also remembered for the horrifying crash of Danny Ongais, and a major pit fire involving Rick Mears. Ongais was critically injured, and Mears suffered burns, but both drivers would recover. Another massive pit fire occurred eight weeks later at the Norton Michigan 500. This prompted new rules and standards be put in place regarding the safety of fueling rigs, and pit area safety in general.

== Background ==
Three years into the first open wheel "Split", the sport of Indy car racing began settling into a more stabilized environment by 1981. A joint-sanctioning agreement known as the Championship Racing League (CRL) dissolved in mid-1980. USAC and CART went their separate ways, and actually awarded separate national championship titles that season. Johnny Rutherford happened to win both, and was the consensus champion for 1980. Beginning in 1981, the Indianapolis 500 remained sanctioned by USAC, while the preeminent national championship was now the one being sanctioned by CART. The Indy 500 field would consist of the CART-based teams, along with numerous independent, "Indy-only" teams, some of which were USAC-loyal holdovers. Indianapolis was designated an "invitational" race, and for 1981–1982, did not pay championship points to the CART title, although all of the CART teams were still invited. USAC kept alive their own Gold Crown championship, running Indianapolis, the Pocono 500, and a few dirt races.

A record total of 105 entries were expected to shatter the previous records for drivers on the track and qualifying attempts. Speed-cutting measures were still in place, and no drivers were expected to challenge the track records in 1981. The biggest rule change by USAC during the offseason was the banning of ground effects side skirts on the sidepods.

Mario Andretti, as he had done in previous years, planned to race at Indianapolis in-between his busy, full-time Formula One schedule. His plans included qualifying at Indy on pole day weekend (May 9–10), then flying to Europe for the Belgian Grand Prix (May 17). After Belgium, he would fly back to Indianapolis in time for race day (May 24).

In response to a spectator fatality in the infield in 1980 (the result of an overturned Jeep), track management decided to take deliberate steps to curtail the revelry in the infamous "Snake Pit". For the 1981 race, bleachers were erected in the turn one infield. Over the next few years, additional capital improvements further scaled back the size of the area, and eventually the intensity of the rowdiness dropped substantially.

== Race schedule ==
For the first time, USAC held a special test session for first-time drivers. The first-ever Rookie Orientation Program was organized and held over three days in early April. It allowed newcomers the opportunity to take their first laps at the Speedway and acclimate themselves to the circuit in a relaxed environment. It would be held without the pressure of veteran drivers crowding the track, without the distraction of spectators, and with minimal media coverage. The drivers were allowed to take the first phases of their rookie test during the ROP. They would then return to complete the final phase of the test during official practice in May.

Since the 500 had been moved to the Sunday of Memorial Day weekend, the 1981 race marked the earliest date (May 24) on which the race had ever been held. According to the calendar, May 24 is also the earliest date in which it can be scheduled.

Race schedule — April 1981
Sun	Mon	Tue	Wed	Thu	Fri	Sat
			1	2	3	4 ROP
5 ROP	6 ROP	7	8	9	10	11
Race schedule — May 1981
					1	2 Practice
3 Practice	4 Practice	5 Practice	6 Practice	7 Practice	8 Practice	9 Pole Day
10; Time Trials	11; Practice	12; Practice	13; Practice	14; Practice	15; Practice	16; Time Trials
17; Time Trials	18	19	20	21; Carb Day	22; Mini-Marathon	23; Parade
24; Indy 500	25; Memorial Day	26	27	28	29	30
31						

Color	Notes
Green	Practice
Dark Blue	Time trials
Silver	Race day
Red	Rained out*
Blank	No track activity

* Includes days where track
activity was significantly
limited due to rain

ROP – denotes Rookie
Orientation Program

== Practice and qualifying ==
=== Practice – week 1 ===
Practice started on Opening Day, Saturday May 2. The two most notable rookies of the field made most of the headlines for the afternoon. Young Josele Garza (actually 19 at the time, lied on his entry form to say he was 21) and Geoff Brabham both passed their rookie tests.

On Sunday May 3, Al Unser became the first driver to practice over 190 mph (310 km/h). A day later, his brother Bobby Unser pushed the speeds over 197 mph (317 km/h). The first incidents of the month occurred Monday, when Gordon Smiley spun, and Pete Halsmer crashed in turn 4.

Tuesday (May 5) was completely rained out, and Wednesday (May 6) was windy, keeping the speeds mostly down. A record 50 cars took to the track on Thursday (May 7), with Mario Andretti fastest of the day at 194.300 mph (312.696 km/h).

On Friday, the final day of practice before pole day, Penske teammates Bobby Unser and Rick Mears were hand-timed just a tick below 200 mph (320 km/h). Mario Andretti was a close third over 198 mph (319 km/h).

=== Time trials – weekend 1 ===
On Saturday May 9, rain delayed the start of pole position time trials until 3:34 p.m. An abbreviated session saw only 9 cars finish qualifying runs. A. J. Foyt was the fastest of the nine, sitting on the provisional pole at 196.078 mph (315.557 km/h), lightly brushing the North Chute wall and continuing without incident. Rain stopped qualifying for the day at 5:49 p.m., and pushed pole qualifying into the next day.

On Sunday May 10, pole position qualifying was scheduled to resume. Rain fell all afternoon, however, and canceled all track activity for the day. 27 cars were still eligible for the pole position, and the resumption of pole day qualifying was scheduled for the following Saturday.

Among the cars not yet qualified was Mario Andretti, who was due to be in Belgium for the Grand Prix the following weekend. His plans to put the car safely in the field on pole weekend were thwarted, and a contingency plan would have to be made.

=== Practice – week 2 ===
Rain continued to fall, and washed out practice on Monday (May 11). On Tuesday May 12, the 200 mph (320 km/h) barrier was finally broken in practice for the month by Danny Ongais. Mario Andretti took his final practice run of the week, and departed for Belgium. Two major crashes occurred, involving Phil Caliva and Phil Krueger. Tim Richmond and Larry "Boom Boom" Cannon both were involved in spins, but suffered no contact.

On Wednesday May 13, Rick Mears pushed the fastest speed of the month to 200.312 mph (322.371 km/h). Retired veteran driver Wally Dallenbach climbed into Mario Andretti's car, and began to take some shake down laps. Due to Andretti's absence for the rest of the week, the Patrick Racing team decided to have Dallenbach qualify the car for him. On race day, Andretti would take over the cockpit once again. Dallenbach was quickly up to speed, over 191 mph (307 km/h) on his first day.

Rain closed the track on Thursday. On Friday, Bobby Unser upped the speed even further, turning a lap of 201.387 mph (324.101 km/h). A record 63 cars took to the track on the final full day of practice. World of Outlaws star, and Indy rookie Steve Kinser crashed in turn 1.

=== Time trials – weekend 2 ===
Pole day time trials resumed on a sunny Saturday May 16. About a half-hour into the session, Bobby Unser took over the pole position with a four-lap average of 200.546 mph (322.748 km/h). Meanwhile, Wally Dallenbach put Mario Andretti's car safely in the field at over 193 mph (311 km/h). Mike Mosley squeezed himself into the front row posting a 197.141 mph (317.268 km/h) run. Moments later, Rick Mears took to the track. After a lap over 200.9 mph (323.3 km/h), his car developed a vibration, and he was forced to wave off, giving up his chance for the pole position. Pole qualifying continued until 2:00 p.m., when the original qualifying line was finally exhausted. Bobby Unser was awarded the pole, and the next round of qualifying began.

After pole qualifying was over, Tom Sneva qualified his car at 200.691 mph (322.981 km/h). It was the fastest speed of the month, but since it did not take place in the pole round, he was not eligible for the pole position. Later in the day, Rick Mears took a back-up car out to qualify, but had to settle for a slower speed, and 22nd starting position. A very busy day saw the field filled at 5:00 pm and two drivers being bumped. A total of 53 qualifying attempts were made on Saturday, breaking the previous single day record of 45.

On Sunday, bump day time trials were very busy. Ten cars were bumped during 25 attempts. The last complete attempt saw Jerry Sneva bump Jerry Karl. However, after being tipped off by Steve Krisiloff, Karl protested and Jerry Sneva was disqualified for using too much boost during his qualification attempt. It marked the first time since 1934 that the venerable Offenhauser engine did not make the race.

== Carburetion Day ==
The final practice was held Thursday May 22. All 33 qualified cars took laps, along with first alternate Herm Johnson and Jerry Sneva. Sneva was appealing a decision by USAC in which he was disqualified for qualifying with a tampered pop-off valve. Ultimately, Sneva would lose his appeal.

Bobby Unser (197.5 mph) was the fastest driver of the afternoon. No crashes were reported, but there were five yellows for minor incidents. Johnny Rutherford suffered an electrical fire in the pits due to faulty wiring. The fire was quickly extinguished, and Rutherford was not injured. Repairs were made, and car was back out on the track later in the session. Mario Andretti returned from Belgium, and practiced in his already-qualified car.

Jerry Karl was absent from practice after being arrested on Thursday morning. He was booked downtown, and later bonded out of jail. Bob Harkey substituted for him and took his car out for some practice laps.

The starting grid was altered slightly. Wally Dallenbach, who qualified Mario Andretti's car 8th, stepped aside as planned, and the car moved to the rear of the grid. In addition, George Snider sold his ride on Wednesday night to Tim Richmond. As a result, that car was also moved to the back of the field.

=== Pit Stop Contest ===
The 5th annual Miller High Life Pit Stop Contest was held on Thursday May 21. The eliminations consisted of two rounds. Teams were required to change two tires and simulate a fuel coupling. The preliminary round would feature two teams at a time, racing head-to-head against the clock. The two fastest teams overall - regardless of the individual head-to-head results - would advance to the final round. Bobby Unser and Penske Racing defeated Larry "Boom Boom" Cannon in the final round to win the event. It was Penske's first victory in the Pit Stop Contest.

Preliminary Round
Rank	Car No.	Driver	Team
3	16	Tony Bettenhausen	Bettenhausen Motorsports
4	28	Herm Johnson	Menard Racing
5	91	Don Whittington	Whittington Brothers
6	84	Tim Richmond	Mach I Enterprises

Finals
3	Bobby Unser (Penske Racing)	13.00
99	Larry Cannon (KRACO Racing)	23.20

== Starting grid ==
Row	Inside		Middle		Outside	
1	3	(United States) Bobby Unser W	48	(United States) Mike Mosley	14	(United States) A. J. Foyt W
2	20	(United States) Gordon Johncock W	1	(United States) Johnny Rutherford W	55	(Mexico) Josele Garza R
3	7	(United States) Bill Alsup R	60	(United States) Gordon Smiley	88	(United States) Al Unser W
4	5	(United States) Pancho Carter	8	(United States) Gary Bettenhausen	32	(United States) Kevin Cogan R
5	35	(United States) Bob Lazier R	56	(United States) Tom Bigelow	50	(Australia) Geoff Brabham R
6	16	(United States) Tony Bettenhausen Jr. R	53	(United States) Steve Krisiloff	33	(Australia) Vern Schuppan
7	31	(United States) Larry Dickson	2	(United States) Tom Sneva	25	(United States) Danny Ongais
8	6	(United States) Rick Mears W	81	(United States) Sheldon Kinser	79	(United States) Pete Halsmer R
9	74	(United States) Michael Chandler R	91	(United States) Don Whittington	90	(United States) Bill Whittington
10	4	(Australia) Dennis Firestone	37	(United States) Scott Brayton R	51	(United States) Tom Klausler R
11	38	(United States) Jerry Karl	40	(United States) Mario Andretti W	84	(United States) Tim Richmond

=== Driver changes ===
- Car of Mario Andretti qualified 8th by Wally Dallenbach (moved to 32nd on grid for race day)
- Car of George Snider qualified 29th, sold to Tim Richmond (moved to 33rd on grid for race day)

=== Alternates ===
- First alternate: Herm Johnson R (#28) – Bumped
- Second alternate: Bill Engelhart (#29) – Bumped

=== Failed to Qualify ===
- George Snider (#84) – Sold qualified car to Richmond
- Steve Chassey R (#64) – Bumped
- Larry Cannon (#96, #99) – Bumped
- Tom Bagley (#43) – Bumped
- Tim Richmond (#21) – Bumped; purchased Snider entry
- Roger Mears R (#98) – Bumped
- John Mahler (#92, #93) – Wave off
- Dick Simon (#22) – Wave off
- Bill Tempero R (#15) – Wave off
- Harry MacDonald R (#45) – Wave off
- Bob Frey R (#71) – Wave off
- Phil Caliva R (#47, #87) – Wave off
- Bill Vukovich II (#42) – Wave off
- Ken Hamilton R (#63) – Wave off
- Johnny Parsons (#8, #12, #18) – Wave off
- Jerry Sneva (#17, #34, #72, #74) – Disqualified after qualifications had ended
- Spike Gehlhausen (#23, #34) – Wrecked during qualifying attempt
- Phil Krueger R (#89) – Wrecked during qualifying attempt
- Roger Rager (#21, #66) – Blew engine during qualifying attempt
- Jim Hurtubise (#65) – Blew engine during qualifying attempt
- Tom Klauser (#51) – Incomplete attempt
- Chip Mead R (#49) – Incomplete attempt
- Rich Vogler R (#44, #46) – Incomplete attempt
- Steve Kinser R (#78) – Practice crash
- Joe Saldana (#24, #69) – Practice crash
- Steve Ball R (#85)
- Dick Ferguson (#95)
- Bob Harkey (#71, #89, #96)
- Bubby Jones (#58)
- Greg Leffler (#43, #44)
- John Martin (#57)
- Jim McElreath (#26)
- Larry Rice (#52)
- Phil Threshie (#67)
- Frank Weiss R (#93)
- Dale Whittington R (#91)
- Jim Buick R (#86) – Practice only
- Jerry Miller R (#65) – Passed rookie test
- Pat Bedard R (#17) – Passed rookie test

== Race recap ==
Ticket stub

=== Start ===
The field accelerated as it came through turn 4, anticipating the green flag. To the shock of many drivers in the back of the field, the green flag wasn't waved until Bobby Unser crossed the start-finish line, and many of the back-row markers did not see the green flag until the front-runners accelerated away through turn 1.

Bobby Unser took the lead into turn 1, and pulled away from the field, with Johnny Rutherford moving up from row 2 into second place. Mike Mosley, who started 2nd, blew a radiator on lap 16 and finished in last place (33rd). Tom Sneva, with the fastest car in the field, charged from the 20th starting position to third place by lap 20. Unser pitted on lap 22 and Rutherford took the lead, only to go out three laps later with a broken fuel pump. Sneva led for a lap, then pitted under the yellow flag for Rutherford's tow-in. Unser made a second pit stop on lap 32 when Don Whittington's accident brought out another yellow, which was extended when Gary Bettenhausen's car stopped on the backstretch. Sneva inherited the lead ahead of Gordon Smiley and Rick Mears, with Bobby Unser fourth.

On lap 39, the field anticipated the green flag and started accelerating between turns 3 and 4. Just then, USAC changed their minds and ordered the pace car to stay on the track. By then, Tom Sneva had accelerated through turn 4 and passed the pace car. Realizing his mistake, Sneva slowed down and blended back behind the pace car, although two more cars passed it before also slowing down. Deciding that it was the result of their own mistake, USAC decided not to impose any penalties for the potential infraction. Sneva held the lead until the second round of pit stops began on lap 56. Sneva pitted first, but the car stalled as he tried to pull away. As Sneva's crew tried to re-fire the engine, new leader Rick Mears pulled into his pit directly behind Sneva.

=== Mears pit fire ===
Gordon Smiley led lap 57, his first and only lap led in his career at Indianapolis.

When Rick Mears pitted on lap 58, fuel began to gush from the refueling hose before it had been properly connected to the car. Fuel sprayed out over the car, into the cockpit onto Mears, and splashed onto some of the mechanics. It then ignited when it contacted the engine or the exhaust. Methanol burns with a transparent flame and no smoke, and pit crew members and spectators fled from the invisible fire. Mears, on fire from the waist up, jumped out of his car and ran to the pit wall, where a safety worker—not seeing the fire—tried to remove Mears' helmet. Meanwhile, Mears' fueler, covered in burning fuel, waved his arms to attract the attention of the fire crews already converging on the scene. By this time the safety worker attending to Mears had fled, and Mears, unable to breathe, leapt over the pit wall toward another crewman carrying a fire extinguisher, who dropped the extinguisher and also fled. Mears tried to turn the extinguisher on himself, then his father, Bill Mears, having already pulled Rick's wife Dina to safety, grabbed the extinguisher and put out the fire. His mechanics had also been extinguished, and the fire crew arrived to thoroughly douse Mears' car.

Thanks to quick action by Bill Mears and the fact that methanol produces less heat than gasoline, no one was seriously hurt in the incident. Rick Mears and four of his mechanics—including Derrick Walker, a future crew chief on the Penske team—were sent to a hospital, and Mears underwent plastic surgery on his face, particularly on his nose which caused him to miss the next race at Milwaukee the following week.

Two months later at the Norton Michigan 500, Herm Johnson had another fuel rig failure that injured 14 people during a Lap 27 pit stop where the refueling rig failed to shut off fuel flow. That caused a 1-hour, 37-minute red flag and forced a redesign to the fuel nozzle used on Indy cars, adding a safety valve that would only open when the nozzle was connected to the car. The pitside tanks were also modified to add a dead man's valve, and were required to be anchored to the ground. Previously, some teams would prop up the giant tanks—sometimes precariously—to angle them so as to increase the head pressure and speed up the fuel flow. Additional safety measures eventually followed, including requiring all participants in the pits, not just over-the-wall crew, to wear fire resistant uniforms, and for the fueler to wear a helmet.

Later in the race, Bobby Unser also reported suffering a small fire during one of his pit stops, but he was able to extinguish the flames by pulling away. The 180-mph wind from racing down the backstretch fanned out the flames, but not before his uniform burned through on the left side.

=== Danny Ongais crash ===
Danny Ongais came into the pits on lap 63 as the leader of the race, but problems during the stop caused it to drag on for 46 seconds. After finally leaving the pits, Ongais approached a slower car at the end of the backstretch. Perhaps still upset about the long stop, he made a late pass going into turn 3. Carrying too much speed into the turn, the car drifted out into the gray area and the rear tires lost traction. Ongais tried to correct the slide by turning right, but the car hooked to the right and crashed nearly head-on into the wall in turn three. (One year later, Gordon Smiley lost control similarly at the same location, but crashed directly head-on and was killed.)

The front end of the car was ripped away, leaving an unconscious Ongais completely exposed in the cockpit. The car continued to slide around turn three, and came to rest point forward in the north short chute. The back of the car was on fire, and a long trail of burning oil was behind. Safety crews quickly surrounded the car and used the Jaws of Life to extricate Ongais, who suffered a concussion and badly broken feet and legs. Remarkably, Ongais made a full recovery and raced again at Indianapolis just one year later.

The caution stayed out for 15 laps to clean up the incident. Safety workers also tended to some spectators who were hit by debris outside turn three. Gordon Johncock was now the leader, with Bobby Unser and Mario Andretti in close pursuit.

=== Unser pit incident ===
On lap 131, Tom Sneva, who fell 35 laps down after his engine stall on lap 58, was eliminated when his engine failed. He stopped his car in the infield grass of turn 1 and climbed out. Sneva, after having the fastest car, was frustratedly out of the race with a blown engine. In an interview with Chris Economaki minutes later, Sneva said that the engine stall happened because he couldn't get the car in gear and once the problem was fixed the engine began to have problems and finally came apart on Sneva's 96th lap.

Pete Halsmer crashed out of the race on lap 135 and the caution waved again soon afterwards for Josele Garza's accident. He was uninjured. Despite crashing, Josele Garza's effort in the race won him the 1981 Indianapolis 500 Rookie of the Year award. After three laps of caution, the race resumed with Mario Andretti as the race leader and Bobby Unser in second.

On lap 146, Tony Bettenhausen Jr. had a tire going down, which he at the time was unaware of. Approaching turn four, the tire deflated, and Bettenhausen attempted to move out of the groove and out of traffic. In the process, he touched wheels with Gordon Smiley, sending Smiley's car spinning and into the wall backwards in turn 4. Three laps later, leader Mario Andretti and second place Bobby Unser went into the pit area for service. Unser finished his pit stop first, and was the first out. Andretti followed a few seconds behind.

While the two cars were exiting the pits, the pace car was leading the field at reduced speed through turns 1 and 2. Bobby Unser stayed on the track apron, below the painted white line, and proceeded to pass 14 cars. He took his place in line as the fifth car immediately behind the pace car, still the overall race leader. Mario Andretti himself also passed two cars before he blended into the field in the south short chute. Both drivers' actions went largely unnoticed at the time. Andretti claimed that he immediately called his pit crew on the radio and told him that Unser had passed cars under the yellow. A couple of the lapped cars ahead of Unser subsequently pitted, thus Unser took the green flag on the ensuing restart as the third car in line. Unser quickly dispatched of the lapped cars by turn four, and took a commanding lead into turn one.

- USAC chief steward Tom Binford and timing and scoring chief Art Graham investigated Andretti's claim in the immediate aftermath. None of the trackside observers responded having witnessed Unser's infraction. One observer claimed to have been in the restroom when it occurred. With no witness, no penalty was considered for Unser (for passing under the yellow) while the race was in progress.
- No announcers on the live radio broadcast made note of any yellow flag passes, nor was it reported that any penalty for doing so was under consideration.
- The ABC television broadcast, a delayed broadcast that aired later in the evening, was later found to have its commentary recorded in post production. As a result, broadcasters were made aware of the incident during post production as commentary was being recorded. They noticed Unser's passes as they occurred while viewing the video in the session, then expressed astonishment at them.

=== Finish ===
After Unser's controversial move under caution to some, the race restarted on lap 152. Bobby Unser quickly established himself as the fastest car on the track since Sneva dropped out, taking a 5-second lead on second place. However, Andretti was able to catch up to Unser in spite of losing so many positions under the yellow. Andretti made a move on a lap 166 restart, briefly taking the lead from Unser in turn 1. Unser returned the favor into turn 3, passing Andretti and quickly establishing a rapid pace. By that point, Andretti started having a tire leak, which caused him to eventually lose second place to his teammate, Gordon Johncock.

On lap 178, the drivers on the lead lap were Unser, Johncock, and Andretti. A yellow flag came out, which allowed Johncock and Andretti to catch a break. Pit stops were made, and Johncock emerged as the new leader. Johncock led the next three laps before he got passed by Unser. Johncock would later suffer a blown engine with 8 laps to go, handing second place to Andretti. Bobby Unser assumed the lead on lap 182, with Mario Andretti second, running over 8 seconds behind. Although Unser slowed his pace during the final two laps, he held on to win by 5.180 seconds, one of the closest finishes at Indianapolis to that point.

Bobby Unser celebrated his third Indy 500 victory (also 1968 and 1975), while Mario Andretti was lauded for charging from 32nd starting position to a 2nd-place finish. Unser made a total of ten pit stops, a record for the most ever by a winner. In victory lane a satisfied Bobby Unser made no mention of a controversy about his win when interviewed by ABC's Chris Economaki. Though it was not widely noted at the time, it is believed that Unser did not partake in the traditional victory lane bottle of milk.

== Controversy ==
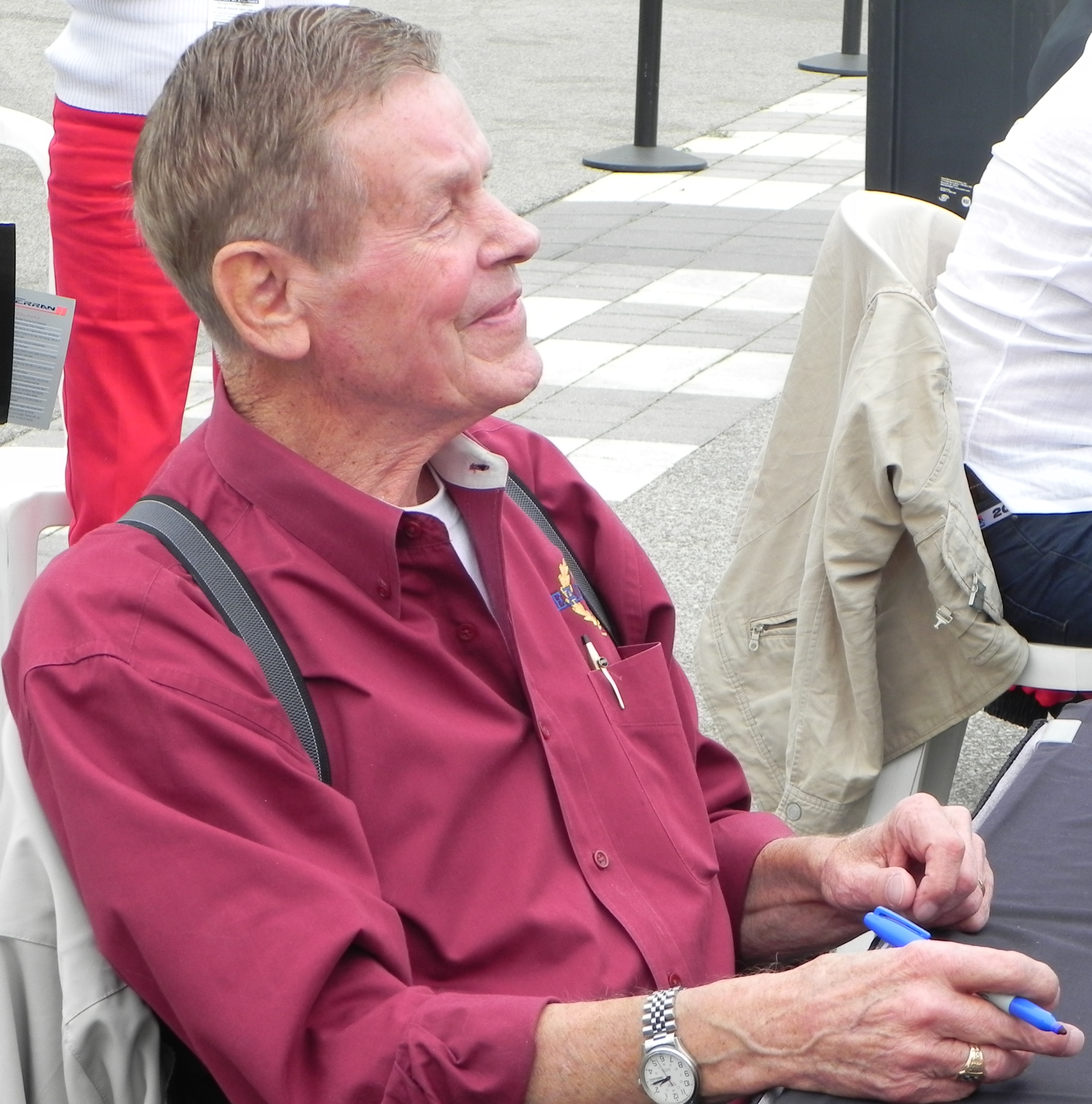
Bobby Unser finished first but was penalized after the race for an infraction, and was dropped to second place in the official results. His victory was reinstated on October 9.

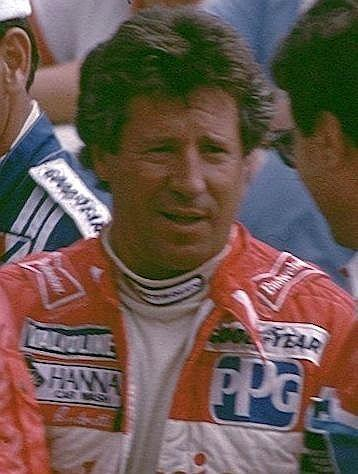
Mario Andretti finished second, but was declared the winner after Bobby Unser's penalty was issued. Andretti was returned to second on October 9 when Unser's victory was reinstated.

=== Post race ===
Shortly after the race was over, rumblings over a possible protest or penalty were beginning to surface around the garage area. Andretti's team Patrick Racing, as well as other drivers, were voicing complaints over Bobby Unser passing cars under the yellow on lap 149. Word of the incident reached chief race steward Thomas W. Binford by mid-evening. At the time, it was the policy of USAC to post official results for the Indianapolis 500 at 8 a.m. the morning after the race, and that any protest of that result could be filed after the race results were posted. In a taped interview with Chris Economaki three hours after the race ended, Binford announced that he would be reviewing the video of lap 149 with the board overnight and that based on what he saw, Unser was likely to get penalized for the passes.

=== Television controversy ===
ABC televised the race on same-day tape delay at 9 p.m. EDT. At the time, it was the policy of ABC Sports to record live booth commentary of the race at the start of the race and at the end of the race. For the remaining portions of the race, semi-scripted commentary was recorded during post-production.

Unlike the live radio broadcast, which did not notice nor mention the infraction, the television broadcast focused heavily on the incident, and reported it as it was being aired. It was later revealed that commentators Jim McKay and Jackie Stewart had provided the lap 149 incident commentary in post-production, and did so with the knowledge that a protest of Unser's actions was in the works.

Jim McKay: "Bobby, out again – and Bobby, going out, very – passed a car – What's he doing? He – oh look at that! He's passed about half a dozen cars."

Jackie Stewart: "Oh, James, that's a – !"

McKay: "Under the yellow. You can't do that!"

Stewart: "That is a no-no! He has accelerated probably in the haste of leaving the pit lane, he's certainly overtaken these other cars; I'm not sure why he did that. I know that you're certainly not supposed to do it. The regulations say that under yellow flag conditions you must not pass any other cars, and that certainly has been the case here..."

McKay: "...but you're supposed to blend into the traffic, right? Let's see if he did that at all."

Stewart: "Yes, you are supposed to...but certainly he's accelerated all the way down below the double yellow line there, and simply overtaken a lot of cars there; I'm sure Bobby must know the regulations, I'm sure he knew what he was doing, whether his mind was somewhere else I can't say, but he shouldn't have passed these other cars, Jim."

— ABC 1981 Indianapolis 500 coverage of the Unser lap 149 incident

After the end of the race and Unser's victory lane interview was aired on tape delay, a live segment of broadcast concluded ABC's race coverage at approximately 11:45 p.m. EDT (10:45 p.m. IST). At that late hour, Mario Andretti sat with broadcasters Jackie Stewart and Jim McKay in the broadcast booth, and announced that a protest was in process:

"Well, there is a protest in process, mainly because we're talking about an unusual infraction of the rules. The one particular rule we dwell on quite a bit during the private and also the public drivers are passing under yellow. This one instance where Bobby and I were exiting the pits, I was right behind him... I just lost sight. He went about 7...8...9 cars in front of me..."

It was followed by the previously recorded interview with chief steward Tom Binford with Chris Economaki, with the assertion that video would be reviewed overnight, and that Unser was likely to be penalized. The overall broadcast was considered misleading, and biased against Unser, for several reasons:

- It suggested that Unser's infraction was noticed by – and was immediately obvious to – ABC's broadcast booth at the time it occurred, based on the impromptu nature of conversation, and surprise, both McKay and Stewart emoted. Their remarks were recorded later, after they had knowledge of both Unser's win, and that a protest of Unser's infraction could in fact cost him the race win.
- The broadcast focused only on Unser's infraction, as it had earlier been relayed to them, and did not mention Andretti's. It was later shown on the official highlight film that as Andretti watched Unser in front of him passing a dozen cars, Andretti himself had passed one or two cars too, but A. J. Foyt (a lapped car) claimed that he had waved Andretti by – which was permissible under the rules – to allow Andretti to blend in closer to the lead lap drivers. That did not come to light until later, and was not considered reason to revise the official standings for a second time.
- ABC's race-end coverage featured Andretti in the booth, live, announcing his intention to protest the results, while they stated that Unser was not available for comment or interview. However, Unser later disputed that, claiming he was at the Howard Johnson's motel down the street, and that the media was provided with a direct phone number in case they needed to contact him. Furthermore, according to Robin Miller in a 2017 interview, television had little excuse because it was well known around the paddock that Unser stayed at the hotel in question because he was a 'cheapskate'.
- Stewart, in the post-produced coverage, singled out Unser for making a mistake that he could be penalized for, and suggested both that it was a severe infraction, and that he should have known better.

Unser took ABC's coverage, and Stewart's in particular, personally. In answer to this, Stewart said, "Bobby was upset. He said that if it had not been for me and ABC, USAC wouldn't have had to take action. My job is not to advise officials, but it is to inform my viewers. Had I not pointed that out to illustrate an infraction of the regulations as I understood them, I would have done a great disservice to the audience."

=== Official results ===
USAC spent the night reviewing race tapes and scoring reports. At 8 a.m. EST Monday morning, the official results of the race were posted. Bobby Unser was charged with passing cars under the yellow, and was penalized 1 position (some erroneous reports listed it as a 1-lap penalty) for the infraction. The penalty dropped Unser down to second place, and elevated Mario Andretti to first place. Andretti was declared the victor, and for the moment it made him a two-time Indianapolis 500 winner.

That night, the traditional Victory Banquet was held at the Indiana Convention Center in downtown Indianapolis, with Andretti the new guest of honor. The mood was subdued, and the event was overshadowed by large-scale media attention (Bobby Unser did not attend the banquet). The winner's share of the purse was announced, but the pay envelope presented to Andretti was empty. Andretti was presented with the official pace car but was not given the keys. Ted Koppel's Nightline focused the evening's program on the controversy and included a live interview with Andretti who compared the situation to the 1978 Italian Grand Prix, a race in which he won on the track, but was stripped of victory when officials deemed he jumped the start.

Andretti stated in an interview during the banquet: "I am glad the officials did the right thing but it still is sad. When Bobby won he went through all the hoopla and got to experience victory lane and the other things a winner gets to experience in victory lane...then it was taken from him and given to me. And I will never get to experience that myself."

Penske Racing, Bobby Unser's team, immediately filed an official protest of the decision. On the Wednesday (18) after the race, a five-person panel of officials (led by Tom Binford), denied the protest. Roger Penske subsequently filed an appeal to the USAC Appeals Board. Bobby Unser refused to take a part willingly in the appeal stating (17):

"It's already been ruined for me. I'm very bitter. I'm not waiting for the decision either. The damage has already been done and I will paint racing out of my future if I was drawing my future."

== Protest and appeals ==
Roger Penske filed an appeal after the official results were posted which had declared Andretti the winner. A hearing was held on June 12, 1981. The USAC appeals hearing resembled a court case. According to some in attendance, witnesses who took the stand were subjected to numerous odd and superfluous questions, many with little or no relevance to the race itself. The hearings reportedly were dragged out with considerable wasted time. Mid-way through the hearing, the meeting was adjourned. While the CART-based attendees did not have a race upcoming that weekend, those in USAC had to depart, for among other reasons, to go to Pocono. The resumption of the hearing was scheduled for July 29.

Bobby Unser's primary argument was based upon the "blend rule", and its perceived vague definition in the rule book. When exiting the pit area during a yellow caution periods, drivers were instructed to look to their right and see which car was next to them out on the track. After accelerating to sufficient speed, the driver was to "blend" (merge) into the field behind that car. Mario Andretti argued that it was an established guideline that the place to look for the car to blend behind was at the south end of the pit straight, where the concrete separator wall ends. Bobby Unser countered that he understood that, as long as the car stayed under the white line and in the apron, the place to blend in was the exit of turn two. Unser argued that the warm-up apron was an extension of the pit area. Unser added that drivers were allowed to do that as long as they did not pass the pace car nor pass the car immediately behind the pace car. He also contended that Andretti had passed at least two cars himself, and should have also incurred a penalty. In addition, it was pointed out that USAC allowed the alleged infraction to go unpenalized throughout the remainder of the race (instead of acting upon it immediately after it happened). Binford, the chief steward, stated that he did receive a complaint after lap 149, but that track observers had missed Unser's infraction, so he was powerless to act during the race.

USAC was faced with a dilemma, as the rulebook was in fact unclear in regards to the blend rule. Officials mulled over the decision for months. On October 8, 1981, a three-member USAC appeals board voted 2–1 to reinstate the victory to Bobby Unser. He was instead fined $40,000.

An official of the USAC board told reporters 3 hours after the reinstatement of Unser's win:

"Based on what we've seen, Thomas Binford and the Indianapolis officials should have detected the infraction at the moment of it. By not penalizing Unser sooner they automatically made the passes allowed because they failed in their responsibility to detect the infraction. So Unser wins the race but a $40,000 fine will replace the one position penalty."

The appeal panel said that, since the violation could have been detected at the time it was committed, a one-lap penalty after the completion of the race was too severe. In its decision, which resulted from a 2-to-1 vote, the panel said that race officials had "a responsibility to observe and report illegal passing in yellow flag situations and they failed to do so."

"The court believes," the panel said in a 23-page opinion written by Edwin Render, its chairman, "that responsible officials knew of the infraction when it was committed ... For these reasons the court rules that it was improper to impose a one-lap penalty on car No. 3 after the race."

Following the ruling, Andretti, without the support of Patrick Racing, filed an appeal with a higher USAC board, arguing that he wasn't given sufficient time to argue his case against Unser. The appeal was denied by the board weeks later. After a final rejected petition to the Automobile Competition Committee for the United States (ACCUS), the American branch of the Fédération Internationale de l'Automobile (FIA), Andretti did not pursue the matter any further.

== Race results ==
=== Revised Box Score ===
The results below represent the final revision of the 1981 Indianapolis 500 results, certified on October 9, 1981.

Pos	No.	Name	Team	Chassis	Engine	Laps	Status	Grid	Pts.
1	3	(United States) Bobby Unser W	Team Penske	Penske PC9B	Cosworth DFX	200	139.084 mph	1	1000
2	40	(United States) Mario Andretti W	Patrick Racing	Wildcat Mk8	Cosworth DFX	200	+5.180	32	800
3	33	(Australia) Vern Schuppan	Theodore Racing	McLaren M24B	Cosworth DFX	199	-1 lap	18	700
4	32	(United States) Kevin Cogan R	Jerry O'Connell Racing	Phoenix 80	Cosworth DFX	197	-3 laps	12	600
5	50	(Australia) Geoff Brabham R	Psachie-Garza Racing	Penske PC-9	Cosworth DFX	197	-3 laps	15	500
6	81	(United States) Sheldon Kinser	Longhorn Racing	Longhorn LR01	Cosworth DFX	195	-5 laps	23	400
7	16	(United States) Tony Bettenhausen Jr. R	Bettenhausen Motorsports	McLaren M24B	Cosworth DFX	195	-5 laps	16	300
8	53	(United States) Steve Krisiloff	Psachie-Garza Racing	Penske PC-7	Cosworth DFX	194	-5 laps	17	250
9	20	(United States) Gordon Johncock W	Patrick Racing	Wildcat Mk8	Cosworth DFX	194	Engine	4	200
10	4	(Australia) Dennis Firestone	Rhoades Racing	Wildcat Mk8	Cosworth DFX	193	Engine	28	150
11	7	(United States) Bill Alsup R	Team Penske	Penske PC-9B	Cosworth DFX	193	-7 laps	7	100
12	74	(United States) Michael Chandler R	Hodgdon Racing	Penske PC-7	Cosworth DFX	192	-8 laps	25	50
13	14	(United States) A. J. Foyt W	Gilmore-Foyt Racing	Coyote	Cosworth DFX	191	-9 laps	3	25
14	84	(United States) Tim Richmond	Mach 1 Enterprises	Parnelli VPJ6C	Cosworth DFX	191	-9 laps	33	25
15	38	(United States) Jerry Karl	Karl Racing	McLaren M16E	Chevrolet	189	-11 laps	31	25
16	37	(United States) Scott Brayton R	Forsythe Racing	Penske PC-6	Cosworth DFX	173	Engine	29	25
17	88	(United States) Al Unser W	Longhorn Racing	Longhorn LR02	Cosworth DFX	166	-34 laps	9	20
18	31	(United States) Larry Dickson	Machinists Union Racing	Penske PC-7	Cosworth DFX	165	Piston	19	20
19	35	(United States) Bob Lazier R	Fletcher Racing	Penske PC-7	Cosworth DFX	154	Engine	13	20
20	56	(United States) Tom Bigelow	Gohr Racing	Penske PC-7	Cosworth DFX	152	Engine	14	20
21	90	(United States) Bill Whittington	Whittington Brothers	March 81C	Cosworth DFX	146	Stalled	27	15
22	60	(United States) Gordon Smiley	Patrick Racing	Wildcat Mk8	Cosworth DFX	141	Crash T4	8	15
23	55	(Mexico) Josele Garza R	Psachie-Garza Racing	Penske PC-9	Cosworth DFX	138	Crash T3	6	15
24	79	(United States) Pete Halsmer R	Arciero Racing	Penske PC-7	Cosworth DFX	123	Crash T3	24	15
25	2	(United States) Tom Sneva	Bignotti-Cotter Racing	March 81C	Cosworth DFX	96	Clutch	20	10
26	8	(United States) Gary Bettenhausen	Lindsey Hopkins Racing	Lightning	Cosworth DFX	69	Rod	11	10
27	25	(United States) Danny Ongais	Interscope Racing	Interscope 022	Cosworth DFX	64	Crash T3	21	10
28	5	(United States) Pancho Carter	Morales-Capels	Penske PC-7	Cosworth DFX	63	Compression	10	10
29	51	(United States) Tom Klausler R	Schulz Racing	Lightning	Chevrolet	60	Gearbox	30	5
30	6	(United States) Rick Mears W	Team Penske	Penske PC-9B	Cosworth DFX	58	Pit Fire	22	5
31	91	(United States) Don Whittington	Whittington Brothers	March 81C	Cosworth DFX	32	Crash BS	26	5
32	1	(United States) Johnny Rutherford W	Chaparral Cars	Chaparral 2K	Cosworth DFX	25	Fuel Pump	5	5
33	48	(United States) Mike Mosley	All American Racers	Eagle 81	Chevrolet	16	Radiator	2	5

W Former Indianapolis 500 winner

R Indianapolis 500 Rookie

All cars utilized Goodyear tires.

=== Race statistics ===
Lap Leaders
Laps	Leader
1–21	Bobby Unser
22–24	Johnny Rutherford
25	Tom Sneva
26–32	Bobby Unser
33–56	Tom Sneva
57	Rick Mears
58	Gordon Smiley
59	Bobby Unser
60–63	Danny Ongais
64–91	Gordon Johncock
92–95	Bobby Unser
96	Gordon Johncock
97–98	Mario Andretti
99–104	Josele Garza
105–112	Gordon Johncock
113–118	Bobby Unser
119–122	Gordon Johncock
123–125	Mario Andretti
126–132	Josele Garza
133–140	Gordon Johncock
141	Bobby Unser
142–148	Mario Andretti
149–178	Bobby Unser
179–181	Gordon Johncock
182–200	Bobby Unser

Total laps led
Driver	Laps
Bobby Unser	89
Gordon Johncock	52
Tom Sneva	25
Josele Garza	13
Mario Andretti	12
Danny Ongais	4
Johnny Rutherford	3
Gordon Smiley	1
Rick Mears	1

Cautions: 11 for 69 laps (1:42:08)
Laps	Reason
5–7	Debris
26–29	Johnny Rutherford tow-in
33–43	Don Whittington crash
67–81	Danny Ongais crash
130–136	Pete Halsmer crash
140–144	Josele Garza crash
146–151	Gordon Smiley crash
152–156	Bill Whittington tow-in
162–165	Tom Bigelow stalled in turn one
180–184	A.J. Foyt tow-in
185–188	Debris

== Aftermath and lore ==
The 1981 Indianapolis 500 was largely considered the most controversial running to date. It was referred to as "The Great Dispute," and in some circles was "Undecided." Bobby Unser, who felt the entire ordeal was politically motivated by his USAC enemies, became disillusioned with auto racing and took a sabbatical from driving. He sat out the 1982 Indy 500, and retired from IndyCar racing officially in 1983. Behind-the-scenes, the $40,000 fine for the win, other fines he faced in sponsorship, his attorney's fees, and importantly the inability to parlay his victory into valuable endorsements, ruined his finances.

After being reinstated the winner, Bobby Unser was presented with the miniature Borg-Warner Trophy, while Mario Andretti had already been presented with the winner's championship ring. While Bobby Unser celebrated in victory lane on race day, the morning after the race, Mario Andretti took part in the winner's photograph session. No official victory photos were taken of Unser. Months after the race, Unser's likeness was sculpted and added to the Borg-Warner Trophy appropriately. A claim was even made at the time that Andretti "threw away the winner's ring" when he heard that Unser was reinstated the victory, but the story appears to have been fabricated. In a 2001 interview with Jack Arute and Bobby Unser on ESPN Classic's "Big Ticket", Andretti confirmed that he kept the ring by wearing it during the appearance.

To this day the race is still controversial. Mario Andretti has maintained that, by the rulebook, he won the race. Unser has retorted that Andretti is being a sore loser. In recent interviews, Unser said that he and Mario were very close friends until that race, and while they maintained a mutual respect, they did not speak with one another for upwards of 37 years, except in a few cases where they had no choice (like at public appearances). This also despite Unser being a broadcaster on television and radio for many years, while Andretti was still competing. They did not personally reconcile until about 2017 when Andretti phoned Unser during an illness. Unser also maintains that U.E. "Pat" Patrick, the car owner for Andretti in that race, was not the impetus for any protest on behalf of Andretti. Rather it was crew chief Jim McGee, and that Patrick actually felt Unser was the rightful winner. Andretti, in a 2019 interview, said that losing his friendship with Unser was more of a "misunderstanding", and he would have been more willing to accept the outcome, "If Unser would have just admitted that "Okay, I got away with one."" Both Unser and Andretti also agree in retrospect that regardless of the outcome, USAC mishandled the situation from start to finish and much of the controversy could have been easily avoided. Despite their differences of opinion over the controversy, Andretti would be among the first people to publicly praise Unser when Unser died in May 2021.

Australians Vern Schuppan (3rd), Geoff Brabham (5th) and Dennis Firestone (10th) were the first trio of foreign drivers to finish in the top ten since British drivers Graham Hill, Jim Clark and Jackie Stewart finished 1st, 2nd, and 6th in 1966. Mario Andretti was born in Italy, but was both an Italian and U.S. citizen by that time. Young rookie Josele Garza, after leading 13 laps during the race, won the Rookie of the Year award. Two years later it would be revealed that Garza fibbed about his age, and was actually 19 years old on race day (rules at the time required drivers to be at least 21 years of age). By 1983, Garza was officially being credited as the youngest starting driver ever in Indy 500 history, a record he would hold until 2003. In 1996, the rules were changed to set the minimum driver age for the Indy 500 to 18 years of age. Drivers as young as 16 years of age have won races at the Speedway on the road course (added in 2000) or dirt track (added in 2018).

=== Robin Miller / A. J. Foyt controversy ===
During practice, a controversy erupted between Indianapolis Star journalist Robin Miller and A. J. Foyt. For the first time, handheld radar guns were being used to measure trap speeds of the race cars along the straightaways. In his May 8 column, Miller casually noted that Foyt had a trap speed measured at 214 mph on the mainstretch, about 8 mph faster than any other car. The report led some in the paddock to question the legality of Foyt's turbocharger "boost" setting. Foyt was angered by the report, and denied any accusations of cheating. During some downtime during Friday afternoon's practice session, Foyt hunted down Miller on the grass parapet along the pit lane, grabbed him and slapped him on the back of the head and threatened to "remove two of [his] vital organs." Foyt claimed his speed was due to engine development over the winter months, and quipped 'Is it a crime to go fast?' Foyt also demanded that the radar guns be turned off.

In response, Miller wrote a scathing column that was published in The Star on Sunday May 10. Miller accused Foyt of throwing temper tantrums, verbal and physical intimidation, and childish behavior. But more importantly, he tallied a lengthy list of USAC races in which Foyt allegedly had cheated in the past. The column sparked controversy, and Foyt immediately refuted the allegations. Foyt demanded the paper issue a retraction, and after they refused, he filed a $3 million libel suit in the United States District Court for the Southern District of Texas. The suit claimed the article was false, with intent to damage Foyt's reputation, as well as create animosity towards Foyt from the other drivers. The dispute simmered during race week, and over the summer months, but was soon largely overshadowed by the Bobby Unser/Mario Andretti controversy that occurred in the race itself.

On November 1, 1981, The Star issued a retraction, acknowledging that Foyt's alleged unprofessional conduct "had never been proven nor protested", and at the time of the retraction, "remain[ed] unproven and unprotested." As a result, Foyt dropped the libel suit. The parties settled out of court for an undisclosed monetary amount, and Judge Carl O. Bue Jr. accepted the agreement and formally dismissed the suit on November 30.

== Broadcasting ==
=== Radio ===
The race was carried live on the IMS Radio Network. Paul Page served as anchor for the fifth year. Lou Palmer reported from victory lane. Darl Wible departed, and Bob Jenkins moved to the fourth turn position, where he would remain through 1989. Larry Henry joined the crew for the first year, stationed on the backstretch. This was Larry's only year on the Backstretch, he moved to Turn 3 the following year. This was Doug Zink's last year in Turn 3.

The reporting location for Turn 2 shifted slightly, although still on the roof of the VIP Suites, the station was moved southward towards the middle of the turn. Howdy Bell, the longtime turn 2 reporter, celebrated his 20th year on the crew. This was Howdy's last year in Turn 2 until 1985. In Turn 3, the reporting location moved to a platform on the L Stand.

Indianapolis Motor Speedway Radio Network
Booth Announcers	Turn Reporters	Pit/garage reporters
Chief Announcer: Paul Page; Driver expert: Rodger Ward; Statistician: John DeCamp; Historian: Donald Davidson	Turn 1: Ron Carrell; Turn 2: Howdy Bell; Backstretch: Larry Henry R Turn 3: Doug Zink; Turn 4: Bob Jenkins	Jerry Baker (north pits); Chuck Marlowe (north-center pits); Luke Walton (south-center pits); Lou Palmer (south pits); Bob Forbes (garages)

=== Television ===
The race was carried in the United States on ABC Sports on a same-day tape delay basis. Sam Posey rode along and reported live from inside the pace car at the start of the race.

The broadcast has re-aired on ESPN Classic since 2003. On May 24, 2003, the race was featured on ESPN Classic's "Big Ticket" series, hosted by Jack Arute featuring interviews with Bobby Unser and Mario Andretti. On July 30, 2003, an expanded edit of the "Big Ticket" version aired.

ABC Television
Booth Announcers	Pit/garage reporters
Host: Dave Diles; Announcer: Jim McKay; Color: Jackie Stewart	Chris Economaki; Sam Posey

== Gallery ==
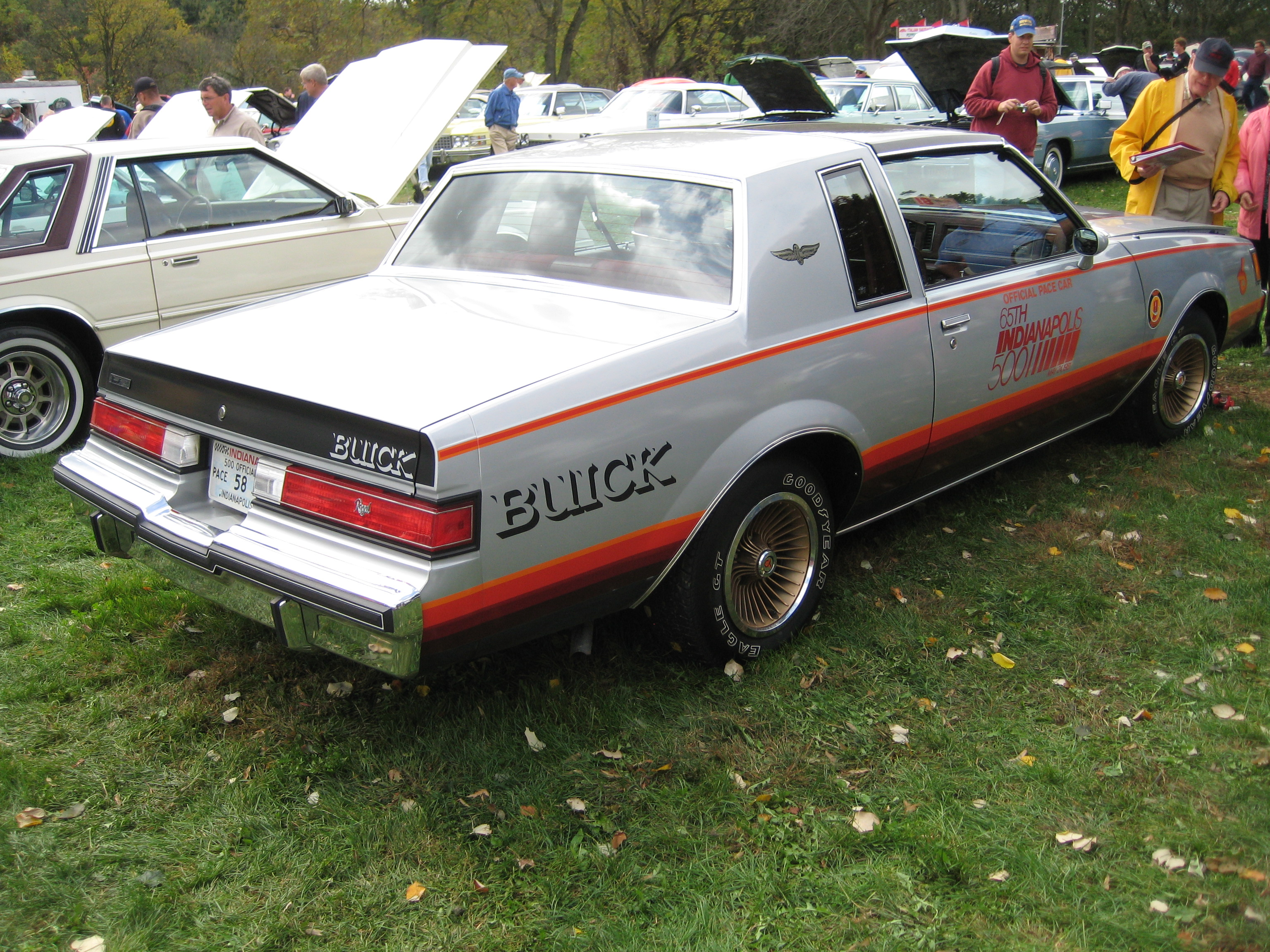
1981 Buick Regal pace car

== See also ==
- The controversial 2002 Indianapolis 500
- 1981-82 USAC Championship Car season

== Notes ==
=== References ===
48. "Racing Board Refuses To Hear Andretti's Plea", NY Times, Retrieved from https://www.nytimes.com/1982/02/04/sports/racing-board-refuses-to-hear-andretti-s-plea.html

49. "Racing Board Refuses to Hear Andretti's Plea", NY Times, Retrieved from https://www.nytimes.com/1982/02/04/sports/racing-board-refuses-to-hear-andretti-s-plea.html

General

- https://www.youtube.com/watch?v=EORP8qYwKA8
- https://www.youtube.com/watch?v=RwmfBp3U2Os
- https://www.nytimes.com/1981/06/29/sports/mears-back-after-indy-fire-wins-twice-mears-back-after-indy-fire-wins-twice.html

=== Works cited ===
- 1981 Indianapolis 500 Day-By-Day Trackside Report For the Media
- Indianapolis 500 History: Race & All-Time Stats – Official Site
- 1981 Indianapolis 500 Radio Broadcast, Indianapolis Motor Speedway Radio Network

1980 Indianapolis 500; Johnny Rutherford	1981 Indianapolis 500; Bobby Unser	1982 Indianapolis 500; Gordon Johncock
