= 1981–82 USAC Championship Car season =

Sports season

- USAC Gold Crown Championship

Season
- Races: 6
- Start date: May 24, 1981
- End date: May 30, 1982

Awards
- National champion: (United States) George Snider
- Indianapolis 500 winner: (United States) Bobby Unser (1981) (United States) Gordon Johncock (1982)

The 1981–82 USAC Championship Car season consisted of six races, beginning in Speedway, Indiana, on May 24, 1981, and concluding at the same location on May 30, 1982. The USAC National Champion was George Snider. The season included two Indianapolis 500 races. The 1981 winner was Bobby Unser, while the 1982 winner was Gordon Johncock. The schedule included dirt courses for the first time since 1970.

By this time, the preeminent national championship season was instead sanctioned by CART.

== Schedule and results ==
The United States Auto Club formed the Gold Crown Series in 1981 which was a combination of the Indianapolis 500 and other races including races on dirt tracks. It was set up so that season would extend over the course of two years with the final race of the season being the Indianapolis 500, with all races running on Oval/Speedway courses.

Rnd	Date	Race name	Length	Track	Location	Type	Pole position	Winning driver
1	May 24	(United States) Indianapolis 500-Mile Race	500 mi (800 km)	Indianapolis Motor Speedway	Speedway, Indiana	Paved	(United States) Bobby Unser	(United States) Bobby Unser
2	June 21	(United States) Van Scoy Diamond Mines 500	305 mi (491 km)^{A}	Pocono International Raceway	Long Pond, Pennsylvania	Paved	(United States) A. J. Foyt	(United States) A. J. Foyt
3	August 15	(United States) Tony Bettenhausen 100	100 mi (160 km)	Illinois State Fairgrounds	Springfield, Illinois	Dirt	(United States) Tom Bigelow	(United States) George Snider
4	August 30	(United States) DuQuoin 100	100 mi (160 km)	DuQuoin State Fairgrounds	Du Quoin, Illinois	Dirt	(United States) Bill Engelhart	(United States) Rich Vogler
5	September 12	(United States) Hoosier Hundred	100 mi (160 km)	Indiana State Fairgrounds	Indianapolis, Indiana	Dirt	(United States) Larry Rice	(United States) Larry Rice
6	May 30	(United States) Indianapolis 500-Mile Race	500 mi (800 km)	Indianapolis Motor Speedway	Speedway, Indiana	Paved	(United States) Rick Mears	(United States) Gordon Johncock

^A Scheduled for 500 miles, stopped early due to rain.

The season opened with the 1981 Indianapolis 500 at the Indianapolis Motor Speedway and Bobby Unser would win. Wally Dallenbach Sr. qualified the #40 car for Mario Andretti. However, after the race USAC officials penalized Unser 1 position and the win went to Andretti. Even if Andretti failed to win he would still go into the Van Scoy Diamond Mines 500 at Pocono International Raceway as the points leader as he was in possession of a USAC Class 1 License. The Van Scoy Diamond Mines 500 was won by A. J. Foyt getting Foyt his 67th and final USAC Gold Crown win. The race was cut from 500 miles down to 305 miles due to rain. At the Tony Bettenhausen 100 at the Illinois State Fairgrounds was won by George Snider for his first and only win in USAC Gold Crown competition. At the DuQuoin State Fairgrounds Rich Vogler would win his first and only race in USAC Gold Crown competition. At the Hoosier Hundred at the Indiana State Fairgrounds Larry Rice would win his only USAC Gold Crown race. The 1981 Indianapolis 500 results were changed to Bobby Unser winning the race over Mario Andretti, costing Andretti 200 points. The season ending 1982 Indianapolis 500 at the Indianapolis 500 was marred by the death of Gordon Smiley during qualifying (he was 36 years old), and at the start 2nd place starter Kevin Cogan would spin into A. J. Foyt's car and Mario Andretti's car, while further back in the field Roger Mears, Dale Whittington, and Bobby Rahal would collide. However, Foyt and Rahal were able to continue. Gordon Johncock would beat Rick Mears to the line to win his second Indianapolis 500. George Snider would win the championship with Geoff Brabham 2nd, Tom Bigelow 3rd, A. J. Foyt 4th, and Gordon Johncock 5th.

== Final points standings ==
Pos	Driver	INDY (United States)	POC (United States)	SPR (United States)	DQSF (United States)	ISF (United States)	INDY (United States)	Pts
1	(United States) George Snider	DNQ	4	1	3	8	21	1395
2	(Australia) Geoff Brabham	5	2				28	1310
3	(United States) Tom Bigelow	20	3	**12***	2	5	18	1280
4	(United States) A. J. Foyt	13	**1**				19	1045
5	(United States) Gordon Johncock	9					1	1000
6	(United States) Mario Andretti	2					31	805
7	(United States) Rick Mears	30					**2***	800
8	(United States) Rich Vogler	DNQ		11	1*	2	DNQ	760
9	(United States) Larry Rice	DNQ	21	2	13	**1***	DNQ	730
10	(Australia) Vern Schuppan	3	17				DNQ	720
11	(United States) Tom Sneva	25	16*				4	635
12	(United States) Jim McElreath	DNQ	7	3	17	24	DNQ	594
13	(United States) Bill Vukovich II	DNQ	6	17		6	DNQ	568
14	(United States) Sheldon Kinser	6		22	15	7	DNQ	536
15	(Canada) Harry MacDonald	DNQ	5					500
16	(United States) Jack Hewitt		12	4	4	13		490
17	(United States) Don Whittington	31					6	405
18	(United States) Gary Bettenhausen	26	27	20	18	3	12	366
19	(United States) Joe Saldana			5	6	22		366
20	(United States) Roger Rager	DNQ	8	8		DNQ	DNQ	350
21	(United States) Tony Bettenhausen Jr.	7					26	310
22	(United States) Jim Hickman						7	300
23	(United States) Herm Johnson	DNQ					9	200
24	(Australia) Dennis Firestone	10					27	160
25	(United States) Johnny Parsons	DNQ	23	24	8	16	20	151
26	(United States) Bill Henderson		10					150
27	(United States) Greg Leffler	DNQ		9	DNS	11	DNQ	100
28	(United States) Bobby Rahal						11	70
29	(United States) Mike Chandler	12					17	40
30	(United States) Bill Whittington	21					16	40
31	(United States) Larry Dickson	18		21		23		32
32	(Mexico) Héctor Rebaque						13	25
33	(United States) Steve Ball	DNQ	14					25
34	(United States) Tim Richmond	14					DNP	25
35	(United States) Danny Sullivan						14	25
36	(United States) Jerry Karl	15					DNQ	25
37	(United States) Chip Ganassi						15	25
38	(United States) Jerry Sneva	DNQ	25				23	25
39	(United States) Richard Hubbard		18					20
40	(United States) Dick Simon	DNQ	20				DNQ	20
41	(Mexico) Josele Garza	23					29	20
42	(United States) Steve Chassey	DNQ		26		14	DNQ	14
43	(United States) Danny Ongais	27					22	10
44	(United States) Salt Walther		26				DNQ	10
45	(United States) Kevin Cogan	4					30	5
46	(United States) Tom Klausler	29						5
47	(United States) Jan Sneva		29				DNQ	5
48	(United States) Roger Mears	DNQ					32	5
49	(United States) Mike Mosley	33					DNQ	5
50	(United States) Dale Whittington	DNQ					33	5
-	(United States) Bobby Unser	**1***					DNQ	0
-	(United States) Pancho Carter	28					3	0
-	(United States) Mark Alderson		11	19	19	4		0
-	(United States) Bill Tyler		15	DNQ	5	DNQ		0
-	(United States) Al Unser	17					5	0
-	(United States) Chuck Amati			6		12		0
-	(United States) Jerry Nemire				7	9		0
-	(United States) Johnny Coogan			7		DNP		0
-	(United States) Johnny Rutherford	32					8	0
-	(United States) Steve Krisiloff	8					DNQ	0
-	(United States) Jerry Miller	DNQ	DNP		9	19		0
-	(United States) Chip Mead		9				DNQ	0
-	(United States) Paul Pitzer		24	DNP	10	17		0
-	(United States) Larry Martin			23		10		0
-	(United States) Art Bisch Jr.			10		DNP		0
-	(United States) Howdy Holmes						10	0
-	(United States) Ken Schrader			16	11			0
-	(United States) Bill Alsup	11					DNQ	0
-	(United States) Jerry Weeks				12			0
-	(United States) Smokey Snellbaker		13	DNQ		15		0
-	(United States) Gary Gray			13		DNP		0
-	(United States) Jeff Bloom		19		14	18		0
-	(United States) Tracy Potter			14	23	DNP		0
-	(United States) Ron Shuman			15		DNQ		0
-	(United States) Scott Brayton	16					DNQ	0
-	(United States) Sleepy Tripp				16	DNQ		0
-	(United States) Bobby Olivero			18	21	20	DNP	0
-	(United States) Bob Lazier	19					DNQ	0
-	(United States) Bill Engelhart	DNQ		DNQ	**20**	26	DNQ	0
-	(United States) Chuck Gurney					21		0
-	(United States) Gordon Smiley	22					DNQ	0
-	(United States) Dean Vetrock		22				DNQ	0
-	(United States) Gary Hieber			DNQ	22			0
-	(United States) Pete Halsmer	24					25	0
-	(United States) Arnie Knepper			DNQ	24			0
-	(United States) Chet Fillip						24	0
-	(United States) Steve Cannon			DNQ		25		0
-	(United States) Manny Rockhold			25		DNP		0
-	(United States) Duke Cook		28	DNQ	DNQ	DNQ		0
-	(United States) Steve Kinser	DNQ		DNS		DNP		0
-	(United States) Bill Puterbaugh				DNS	DNQ		0
-	(United States) Wally Dallenbach Sr.	DNS						0
-	(United States) Bobby Adkins					DNS		0
-	(United States) Gary Patterson			DNQ	DNQ	DNQ		0
-	(United States) Eddie Leavitt			DNQ	DNQ	DNP		0
-	(United States) Al Unser Jr.				DNQ	DNQ		0
-	(United States) Patrick Bedard	DNQ					DNQ	0
-	(United States) Phil Caliva	DNQ					DNQ	0
-	(United States) Bob Frey	DNQ					DNQ	0
-	(United States) Spike Gehlhausen	DNQ					DNQ	0
-	(United States) Ken Hamilton	DNQ					DNQ	0
-	(United States) Bob Harkey	DNQ					DNQ	0
-	(United States) Phil Krueger	DNQ					DNQ	0
-	(United States) John Mahler	DNQ					DNQ	0
-	(United States) John Martin	DNQ					DNQ	0
-	(United States) Lennie Waldo		DNP	DNQ				0
-	(United States) Richard Powell			DNQ	DNP			0
-	(United States) Mack McClellan			DNQ		DNP		0
-	(United States) Jack Ziegler			DNQ		DNP		0
-	(United States) Rick Hood			DNP		DNQ		0
-	(United States) Tom Bagley	DNQ						0
-	(United States) Jim Buick	DNQ						0
-	(United States) Larry Cannon	DNQ						0
-	(United States) Dick Ferguson	DNQ						0
-	(United States) Jim Hurtubise	DNQ						0
-	(United States) Bubby Jones	DNQ						0
-	(United States) Bill Tempero	DNQ						0
-	(United States) Phil Threshie	DNQ						0
-	(Canada) Frank Weiss	DNQ						0
-	(United States) Billy Earl					DNQ		0
-	(United States) Tom Frantz						DNQ	0
-	(United States) Tom Gloy						DNQ	0
-	(United States) Tom Grunnah						DNQ	0
-	(United States) Hurley Haywood						DNQ	0
-	(United States) Gary Irvin						DNQ	0
-	(United States) Lee Kunzman						DNQ	0
-	(United States) Ray Lipper						DNQ	0
-	(United States) Al Loquasto						DNQ	0
-	(Belgium) Teddy Pilette						DNQ	0
-	(United States) Rusty Schmidt						DNQ	0
-	(United States) Billy Scott						DNQ	0
-	(United States) Sammy Swindell						DNQ	0
-	(United States) Leroy van Conett						DNQ	0
-	(South Africa) Desiré Wilson						DNQ	0
-	(United States) Karl Busson			DNP		DNP		0
-	(United States) Lonnie Caruthers			DNP		DNP		0
-	(United States) Ron Fieller			DNP		DNP		0
-	(United States) Mike Gregg			DNP		DNP		0
-	(United States) Bobby Marshall			DNP		DNP		0
-	(United States) Bud Wilmot			DNP			DNP	0
-	(Canada) Buddie Boys	DNP						0
-	(United States) Earle Canavan	DNP						0
-	(United States) Bobby Fisher	DNP						0
-	(United States) Bill Compton			DNP				0
-	(United States) Jerry Potter			DNP				0
-	(United States) Dean Shirley			DNP				0
-	(United States) Jerry Stone			DNP				0
-	(United States) Mel Kenyon					DNP		0
-	(United States) Robert Tapply					DNP		0
-	(United States) Neil Bonnett						DNP	0
Pos	Driver	INDY (United States)	POC (United States)	SPR (United States)	DQSF (United States)	ISF (United States)	INDY (United States)	Pts

Color	Result
Gold	Winner
Silver	2nd place
Bronze	3rd place
Green	4th & 5th place
Light Blue	6th-10th place
Dark Blue	Finished (Outside Top 10)
Purple	Did not finish (Ret)
Red	Did not qualify (DNQ)
Brown	Withdrawn (Wth)
Black	Disqualified (DSQ)
White	Did not start (DNS)
Blank	Did not participate (DNP)
Blank	Not competing

**In-line notation**
**Bold**	Pole position
Italics	Ran fastest race lap
*	Led most race laps
Rookie of the Year
Rookie

== See also ==
- 1981 Indianapolis 500
- 1982 Indianapolis 500
- 1981 CART PPG Indy Car World Series
- 1982 CART PPG Indy Car World Series
