= 1981 Champ Car season =

The 1981 Champ Car season may refer to:

- the 1981–82 USAC Championship Car season, which included five races in 1981
- the 1981 CART PPG Indy Car World Series, sanctioned by CART, who would later become Champ Car
