= 1981 CART PPG Indy Car World Series =

American motorsport season

1981 CART season
- PPG Indy Car World Series

Season
- Races: 11
- Start date: March 22
- End date: November 8

Awards
- Drivers' champion: (United States) Rick Mears
- Constructors' Cup: (United States) Penske
- Manufacturers' Cup: (United Kingdom) Cosworth
- Nations' Cup: United States
- Rookie of the Year: (United States) Bob Lazier

The 1981 CART PPG Indy Car World Series season, the third in the CART era of U.S. open-wheel racing, consisted of 11 races, beginning in Avondale, Arizona on March 22 and concluding at the same location on October 31. The PPG Indy Car World Series Drivers' Champion was Rick Mears despite missing Round 2 at Milwaukee due to injuries sustained in the Indianapolis 500. Rookie of the Year was Bob Lazier. After the disagreement with the USAC during the previous season, the 65th Indianapolis 500 was not part of the Series, however no competing race was scheduled and most CART teams and drivers did take part.

== Drivers and constructors ==
The following teams and drivers competed for the 1981 CART World Series.

Team/Car Owner	Chassis	Engine	#	Drivers	Rounds
(United States) Chaparral Cars	Chaparral	Cosworth	1	(United States) Johnny Rutherford	All
(United States) Jerry O'Connell Racing	Phoenix	Cosworth	2	(United States) Tom Sneva	1
(United States) Jerry O'Connell Racing	Phoenix	Cosworth	32	(United States) Kevin Cogan	2–3, 5–7
(United States) Bignotti-Cotter Racing	March (5–11) Phoenix (2)	Cosworth	2	(United States) Tom Sneva	All except 1 and 3–4
(United States) Bignotti-Cotter Racing	Phoenix	Cosworth	21	(United States) Salt Walther	5
(United States) Team Penske	Penske	Cosworth	3	(United States) Bobby Unser	All
(United States) Team Penske	Penske	Cosworth	6	(United States) Rick Mears	All except 2
(United States) Team Penske	Penske	Cosworth	7	(United States) Bill Alsup	All except 1–2 and 8–9
(United States) Alex Morales Motorsports	Penske (all except 2, 9); Lightning (2, 9)	Cosworth	5	(United States) Pancho Carter	All
(United States) Alex Morales Motorsports	Lightning	Cosworth	75	(United States) Steve Chassey	4
(United States) Longhorn Racing	Longhorn (All except 8) Eagle (8)	Cosworth	8	(United States) Al Unser	All
(United States) Rhoades Competition	Wildcat	Cosworth	12	(Australia) Dennis Firestone	3
(United States) Rhoades Competition	Wildcat	Cosworth	12	(United States) Gary Bettenhausen	5, 7
(United States) Rhoades Competition	Wildcat	Cosworth	12	(United States) Gordon Smiley	6, 10–11
(United States) Gilmore Racing	Coyote	Cosworth	14	(United States) A. J. Foyt	5
(United States) Tempero Racing	McLaren	Chevrolet	15	(United States) Bill Tempero	All except 2
(United States) Bettenhausen Racing	McLaren (1–6) Longhorn (7) Phoenix (8–11)	Cosworth	16	(United States) Tony Bettenhausen Jr.	All except 1
(United States) Leader Card Racing	Vollstedt	Offenhauser	17	(United States) Jerry Sneva	5, 11
(United States) Leader Card Racing	Watson	Cosworth (All except 7–8) Offenhauser (7–8)	22	(United States) Dick Simon	All except 3–4.
(United States) Leader Card Racing	Watson	Cosworth (All except 7–8) Offenhauser (7–8)	22	(United States) Spike Gehlhausen	3-4
(United States) Patrick Racing	Wildcat	Cosworth	20	(United States) Gordon Johncock	All
(United States) Patrick Racing	Wildcat	Cosworth	40	(United States) Mario Andretti	1–4, 8–9, 11
(United States) Patrick Racing	Wildcat	Cosworth	40	(United States) Steve Krisiloff	5, 7
(United States) Brayton Racing	Penske	Cosworth	21	(United States) Mike Mosley	10
(United States) Brayton Racing	Penske	Cosworth	21	(United States) Chip Ganassi	11
(United States) Brayton Racing	Penske	Cosworth	37	(United States) Scott Brayton	All
(United States) McElreath Racing	Eagle	Offenhauser (1, 9–11)Chevrolet (8)	23	(United States) Jim McElreath	1, 8–11
(United States) Luxury Racers	Kingfish	Chevrolet	24	(United States) Wally Pankratz	6
(United States) Luxury Racers	Kingfish	Chevrolet	65	(United States) Wally Pankratz	11
(United States) Buick Racing	Eagle	Chevrolet	26	(United States) Jim Buick	1
(United States) Buick Racing	Eagle	Chevrolet	86	(United States) Jim Buick	2–5
(United States) Menard Racing	Lightning (1–8) Eagle (9–11)	Chevrolet	28	(United States) Herm Johnson	All except 1–2, 4, and 8
(United States) Beaudoin Racing	McLaren	Cosworth	29	(United States) Billy Engelhart	2, 5, 7
(United States) Machinists Union Racing	Penske	Cosworth	31	(United States) Larry Dickson	All except 1
(United States) Theodore Racing	McLaren (5, 10–11) March (6)	Cosworth	33	(Australia) Vern Schuppan	5–6, 10–11
(United States) Wysard Racing	Eagle	Cosworth	34	(United States) Hurley Haywood	6, 9–10
(United States) Wysard Racing	Eagle	Cosworth	34	(United States) Johnny Parsons	11
(United States) Bob Fletcher Racing	Penske (1–6) March (7–11)	Cosworth	35	(United States) Bob Lazier	All
(United States) Karl Racing	McLaren (1) Karl (2–7, 9–10)	Chevrolet	38	(United States) Jerry Karl	All except 8 and 11
(United States) Alsup Racing	Penske	Cosworth	41	(United States) Bill Alsup	1, 8–9
(United States) Alsup Racing	McLaren	Chevrolet	47	(Italy) Phil Caliva	3–7, 11
(United States) Frey Racing	Eagle	Offenhauser	42	(United States) Bob Frey	1
(United States) Frey Racing	Eagle	Offenhauser	71	(United States) Bob Frey	2, 5
(United States) Rattlesnake Racing	Watson	Offenhauser	42	(United States) Bill Vukovich II	5–6, 8, 10
(United States) AMI Racing	Armstrong	Cosworth	43	(United States) Greg Leffler	11
(United States) AMI Racing	Lola	Cosworth	45	(United States) Harry MacDonald	5
(United States) Rager Racing	Wildcat	Chevrolet	44	(United States) Roger Rager	11
(United States) Rager Racing	Wildcat	Chevrolet	66	(United States) Roger Rager	5–9
(United States) Rager Racing	Wildcat	Chevrolet	66	(United States) Orlo Trice	10
(United States) All American Racers	Eagle	Chevrolet	48	(United States) Mike Mosley	2–3, 5, 7–8, 11
(United States) All American Racers	Eagle	Chevrolet	48	(Australia) Geoff Brabham	6, 10
(United States) All American Racers	Eagle	Chevrolet	48	(United States) Rocky Moran	9
(United States) Space Racing	Eagle	Cosworth	49	(United States) Chip Mead	5, 11
(Mexico) Garza Racing	Penske	Cosworth	54	(Australia) Geoff Brabham	1
(Mexico) Garza Racing	Penske	Cosworth	54	(Mexico) Josele Garza	2
(Mexico) Garza Racing	Penske	Cosworth	55	(Mexico) Josele Garza	All except 2
(United States) Gohr Racing	Penske	Chevrolet	56	(United States) Tom Bigelow	3, 5, 7–8, 11
(United States) Metro Racing	McLaren	Offenhauser	57	(Canada) Cliff Hucul	2, 5, 8
(United States) Hamilton Racing	Riley	Chevrolet	63	(United States) Ken Hamilton	6, 11
(United States) Jet Engineering	Eagle	Chevrolet	64	(United States) Steve Chassey	All except 4 and 10
(United States) Mergard Racing	McLaren (2, 9) IAM (10)	Chevrolet (2, 9) Donovan (10)	67	(United States) Phil Threshie	2
(United States) Mergard Racing	McLaren (2, 9) IAM (10)	Chevrolet (2, 9) Donovan (10)	67	(Belgium) Teddy Pilette	9-10
(United States) Hodgdon Racing	Penske	Cosworth	72	(United States) Mike Chandler	5
(United States) Hodgdon Racing	Penske	Cosworth	74	(United States) Mike Chandler	6, 10–11
(United States) Davis Racing	Wildcat	Offenhauser (3–4, 7–9, 11) Chevrolet (6)	77	(United States) Ross Davis	3–4, 6–9, 11
(United States) Joe Hunt Magneto	Eagle	Chevrolet (1, 6, 10) Offenhauser (11)	89	(United States) Phil Krueger	1, 6, 10–11
(United States) Intercomp	Penske	Offenhauser (2, 6–7) Chevrolet (11)	92	(United States) John Mahler	2, 6–7, 11
(Mexico) Grupo-Acypsa	Penske	Offenhauser	93	(Mexico) Michel Jourdain Sr.	10
(United States) Whittington Bros. Racing	March	Cosworth	94	(United States) Bill Whittington	5
(United States) Cannon Racing	Wildcat	Offenhauser	95	(United States) Larry Cannon	1
(United States) Cannon Racing	Wildcat	Offenhauser	95	(United States) Herm Johnson	4
(United States) Cannon Racing	Wildcat	Offenhauser	96	(United States) Tom Frantz	1
(United States) Cannon Racing	Wildcat	Offenhauser	96	(United States) Dick Ferguson	5
(United States) Cannon Racing	Wildcat	Offenhauser	99	(United States) Larry Cannon	2–5
(United States) Cannon Racing	Wildcat	Offenhauser	99	(United States) Dick Ferguson	6-7, 10–11
(United States) Vetrock Racing	Eagle	Chevrolet	X	(United States) Dean Vetrock	2
(United States) Ohio Racing Associates	Longhorn	Cosworth	49	(United States) Steve Krisiloff	8

=== Notable team and driver changes ===
- Tom Sneva left Jerry O'Connell Racing for new team Bignotti-Cotter Racing. The team scaled back to part-time for 1981.
- Team Penske expanded to a three-car operation, with Bill Alsup joining. His owner-driver team Alsup Racing only ran part-time in 1981.
- After racing a limited schedule beforehand, Tony Bettenhausen Jr. ran his first full-time season with his new owner-driver team Bettenhausen Racing.
- Dick Simon replaced Sheldon Kinser at Leader Card Racing, leaving Kinser without a ride. Simon's old team, Vollstedt Enterprises, did not compete.
- Mario Andretti returned to running the majority of the races after a stint in Formula One, driving for Patrick Racing. He replaced Tom Bagley, who was left without a ride.
- Rookie driver Scott Brayton ran a full schedule with family-owned team Brayton Racing.
- After running part-time in 1980, Machinists Union Racing ran a full schedule with driver Larry Dickson.
- Spike Gehlhausen was replaced at Bob Fletcher Racing by rookie driver Bob Lazier.
- Josele Garza ran his first season with family-owned team Garza Racing.
- Steve Chassey ran his first full-time season for the Jet Engineering team.
- AMI Racing only ran two races in 1981 after running full-time in 1980. Gary Bettenhausen was left without a full-time ride.
- Interscope Racing also stopped running full-time, along with driver Danny Ongais.
- At Cannon Racing, Larry Cannon only ran the first few races, with most of the rest driven by Dick Ferguson.
- This was Bobby Unser's final season of IndyCar racing. See the 1981 Indianapolis 500 for more information.

=== Notable equipment changes ===
- Tempero Racing switched from an Eagle to McLaren chassis.
- Menard Racing switched from an Offenhauser to Chevrolet engine. With this shift the Cannon Racing team was the only full-time team that still used Offenhauser engines.

== Schedule ==
Of note was the addition of the inaugural Michigan 500 to replace the California 500 at the now-closed Ontario Motor Speedway. The Tony Bettenhausen 200 at Milwaukee was originally scheduled for August 2, but was rained out and postponed until September 5.

Icon	Legend
O	Oval/Speedway
R	Road course
NC	Non-championship race

Rd	Date	Name	Circuit	Location
1	March 22	(United States) Kraco Car Stereo 150	O Phoenix International Raceway	Avondale, Arizona
NC	May 24	(United States) Indianapolis 500	O Indianapolis Motor Speedway	Indianapolis, Indiana
2	June 8	(United States) Gould Rex Mays Classic	O Milwaukee Mile	West Allis, Wisconsin
3	June 28	(United States) Kraco Twin 125	O Atlanta Motor Speedway	Hampton, Georgia
4	June 28	(United States) Kraco Twin 125	O Atlanta Motor Speedway	Hampton, Georgia
5	July 25	(United States) Norton Michigan 500	O Michigan International Speedway	Brooklyn, Michigan
6	August 30	(United States) Los Angeles Times 500	R Riverside International Raceway	Riverside, California
7	September 5	(United States) Tony Bettenhausen 200	O Milwaukee Mile	West Allis, Wisconsin
8	September 20*	(United States) Detroit News Grand Prix	O Michigan International Speedway	Brooklyn, Michigan
9	October 4	(United States) Watkins Glen 200	R Watkins Glen International	Watkins Glen, New York
10	October 18	(Mexico) I Copa México 150	R Autódromo Hermanos Rodríguez	Mexico City, Mexico
11	November 8	(United States) Miller High Life 150	O Phoenix International Raceway	Avondale, Arizona

* The Detroit News Grand Prix was supposed to run for 150 miles, but was shortened due to a scoring error.

== Results ==
Rd	Race	Pole position	Winning driver	Winning team	Race time
1	(United States) Kraco Car Stereo 150	(United States) Bobby Unser	(United States) Johnny Rutherford	Chaparral	1:17:08
NC	(United States) Indianapolis 500	(United States) Bobby Unser	(United States) Bobby Unser	Team Penske	3:35:42
2	(United States) Gould Rex Mays Classic	(United States) Gordon Johncock	(United States) Mike Mosley	All American Racers	1:19:03
3	(United States) Kraco Twin 125	(United States) Johnny Rutherford	(United States) Rick Mears	Team Penske	0:51:29
4	(United States) Kraco Twin 125	(United States) Rick Mears	(United States) Rick Mears	Team Penske	0:45:20
5	(United States) Norton Michigan 500	(United States) Tom Sneva	(United States) Pancho Carter	Alex Foods	3:45:45
6	(United States) Los Angeles Times 500	(Australia) Geoff Brabham	(United States) Rick Mears	Team Penske	2:43:40
7	(United States) Tony Bettenhausen 200	(United States) Johnny Rutherford	(United States) Tom Sneva	Bignotti-Cotter	1:41:41
8	(United States) Detroit News Grand Prix	(United States) Rick Mears	(United States) Rick Mears	Team Penske	1:10:30
9	(United States) Watkins Glen 200	(United States) Mario Andretti	(United States) Rick Mears	Team Penske	1:52:17
10	(Mexico) I Copa México 150	(United States) Bobby Unser	(United States) Rick Mears	Team Penske	1:24:48
11	(United States) Miller High Life 150	(United States) Bobby Unser	(United States) Tom Sneva	Bignotti-Cotter	1:20:10

Note: The total time of the Norton Michigan 500 does not include red flag stoppage time as the race was stopped for nearly 1 hour due to a bad pit lane fire

=== Final driver standings ===
Pos	Driver	PHX1 (United States)	INDY (United States)	MIL1 (United States)	ATL (United States)		MIS1 (United States)	RIV (United States)	MIL2 (United States)	MIS2 (United States)	WGL (United States)	MXC (Mexico)	PHX2 (United States)	Pts
1	(United States) Rick Mears	4	30		1	**1***	3	1*	2	**1**	1	1	8	304
2	(United States) Bill Alsup	5	11		8	8	4	3	11	4	3	5	17	175
3	(United States) Pancho Carter	7	28	20	5	5	1*	10	10	18	15	6	5	166
4	(United States) Gordon Johncock	6	9	**16**	4	4	36	2	6	5	10	3	3	142
5	(United States) Johnny Rutherford	1*	32	6	**2***	3	22	21	**4**	20	2	26	21	120
6	(United States) Tony Bettenhausen Jr.		7	12	7	11	2	DNQ	14	10	8	11	19	107
7	(United States) Bobby Unser	**2**	**1***	21	13	6	16	9	3	7	17	**15***	**2**	99
8	(United States) Tom Sneva	3	25	4	Wth		**23**	24	1*	19	21	20	1*	96
9	(United States) Bob Lazier RY	12	19	13	17	9	10	5	16	13	4	4	13	92
10	(United States) Al Unser	17	17	5	6	7	11	14	5	3	14	2	22	90
11	(United States) Mario Andretti	11	2	3	3	2				2*	**16***		4	81
12	(United States) Tom Bigelow		20	9			5		24	9			11	60
13	(United States) Scott Brayton R	15	16	11	9	10	7	8	21	24	20	23	DNQ	57
14	(United States) Larry Dickson		18	10	10	12	9	16	12	8	7	22	DNQ	49
15	(United States) Gary Bettenhausen		26				6		19					42
16	(United States) Dick Simon	10	DNQ	7	Wth		31	6	22	25	11	25	20	38
17	(United States) Herm Johnson		DNQ	22	22	17	33	7	13		9	8	9	38
18	(United States) Mike Chandler		12				27	4				16	DNQ	37
19	(United States) Mike Mosley		33	1*	Wth		18		DNS	26		7	24	32
20	(United States) Steve Chassey	Wth	DNQ	24	23	22	20	15	15	12	5		Wth	31
21	(Mexico) Josele Garza	21	23	14	12	18	19	12	8	23	24	18	6	30
22	(United States) Phil Caliva		DNQ		19	15	8	Wth	DNS				DNQ	27
23	(United States) Kevin Cogan		4	2	16	DNS	28	11	23					23
24	(United States) Dick Ferguson		Wth				30	18		6		10	7	20
25	(United States) Steve Krisiloff		8				17		7	17				18
26	(United States) Rocky Moran R										6			16
27	(Australia) Geoff Brabham R	9	5					**19**				9		14
28	(United States) Jerry Karl	8	15	23	21	21	14	22	25		19	19		13
29	(United States) Billy Engelhart		DNQ	8			35		9					11
30	(United States) Larry Cannon	20	DNQ	15	11	20	12							10
30	(United States) Roger Rager		DNQ				13	13	18	21	DNQ		DNQ	10
32	(United States) Bill Tempero	18	DNQ		15	14	34	28	17	15	23	12	DNQ	7
33	(United States) Phil Krueger R	14	DNQ					20				14	16	6
33	(United States) Bill Vukovich II		DNQ				15	DNQ		14		27		6
35	(United States) Gordon Smiley		22					25			18		10	5
36	(United States) Jim McElreath	19	Wth							11	DNQ	13	DNQ	4
36	(United States) Ross Davis				DNQ	19		DNQ	DNQ	16	13		DNQ	4
36	(Australia) Vern Schuppan		3				24	17				21	15	4
36	(United States) Jim Buick R	16	DNQ	19	20	16	DNQ							4
40	(United States) Hurley Haywood							26			12	17		3
41	(United States) Spike Gehlhausen		DNQ		14	13								2
41	(United States) Bob Frey	13	DNQ	17			DNQ							2
41	(United States) John Mahler		DNQ	25			DNQ	27	20				Wth	2
44	(United States) Jerry Sneva		DNQ				DNQ						12	1
44	(United States) Chip Mead		DNQ				29						14	1
44	(United States) Phil Threshie			18										1
44	(Australia) Dennis Firestone		10		18	DNS								1
44	(United States) Johnny Parsons		DNQ										18	1
	(Canada) Harry MacDonald		DNQ				21							0
	(Canada) Cliff Hucul			26			25			22				0
	(United States) Tom Frantz	22												0
	(Belgium) Teddy Pilette										22			0
	(United States) Ken Hamilton		DNQ					23					DNQ	0
	(United States) Greg Leffler		DNQ										23	0
	(Mexico) Michel Jourdain Sr.											24		0
	(United States) A. J. Foyt		13				26							0
	(United States) Salt Walther						32							0
	(United States) Bill Whittington		21				37							0
	(United States) Wally Pankratz							DNQ					Wth	0
	(United States) Joe Saldana		DNQ						DNQ					0
	(United States) Orlo Trice											DNQ		0
	(United States) Chip Ganassi												DNQ	0
	(United States) Pete Halsmer		24				Wth							0
	(United States) Rich Vogler		DNQ				Wth							0
	(United States) Tom Bagley		DNQ											0
	(United States) Tim Richmond		DNQ											0
	(United States) Roger Mears		DNQ											0
	(United States) John Martin		DNQ											0
	(United States) Jim Hurtubise		DNQ											0
	(United States) Bob Harkey		DNQ											0
	(United States) Larry Rice		DNQ											0
	(United States) Jerry Miller		DNQ											0
	(United States) George Snider		Wth											0
	(United States) Patrick Bedard		Wth											0
	(United States) Bubby Jones		Wth											0
	(United States) Steve Kinser		Wth											0
	(United States) Wally Dallenbach		QL^{†}											0
Pos	Driver	PHX1 (United States)	INDY (United States)	MIL1 (United States)	ATL (United States)		MIS1 (United States)	RIV (United States)	MIL2 (United States)	MIS2 (United States)	WGL (United States)	MXC (Mexico)	PHX2 (United States)	Pts

Color	Result
Gold	Winner
Silver	2nd place
Bronze	3rd place
Green	4th & 5th place
Light Blue	6th-10th place
Dark Blue	Finished (Outside Top 10)
Purple	Did not finish
Red	Did not qualify (DNQ)
Brown	Withdrawn (Wth)
Black	Disqualified (DSQ)
White	Did not start (DNS)
Blank	Did not participate (DNP)
Blank	Not competing

**In-line notation**
**Bold**	Pole position
Italics	Ran fastest race lap
*	Led most race laps
RY	Rookie of the Year
R	Rookie

== See also ==
- 1981 Indianapolis 500
- 1981–82 USAC Championship Car season
