= 1980 Indianapolis 500 =

American motor race

64th Indianapolis 500
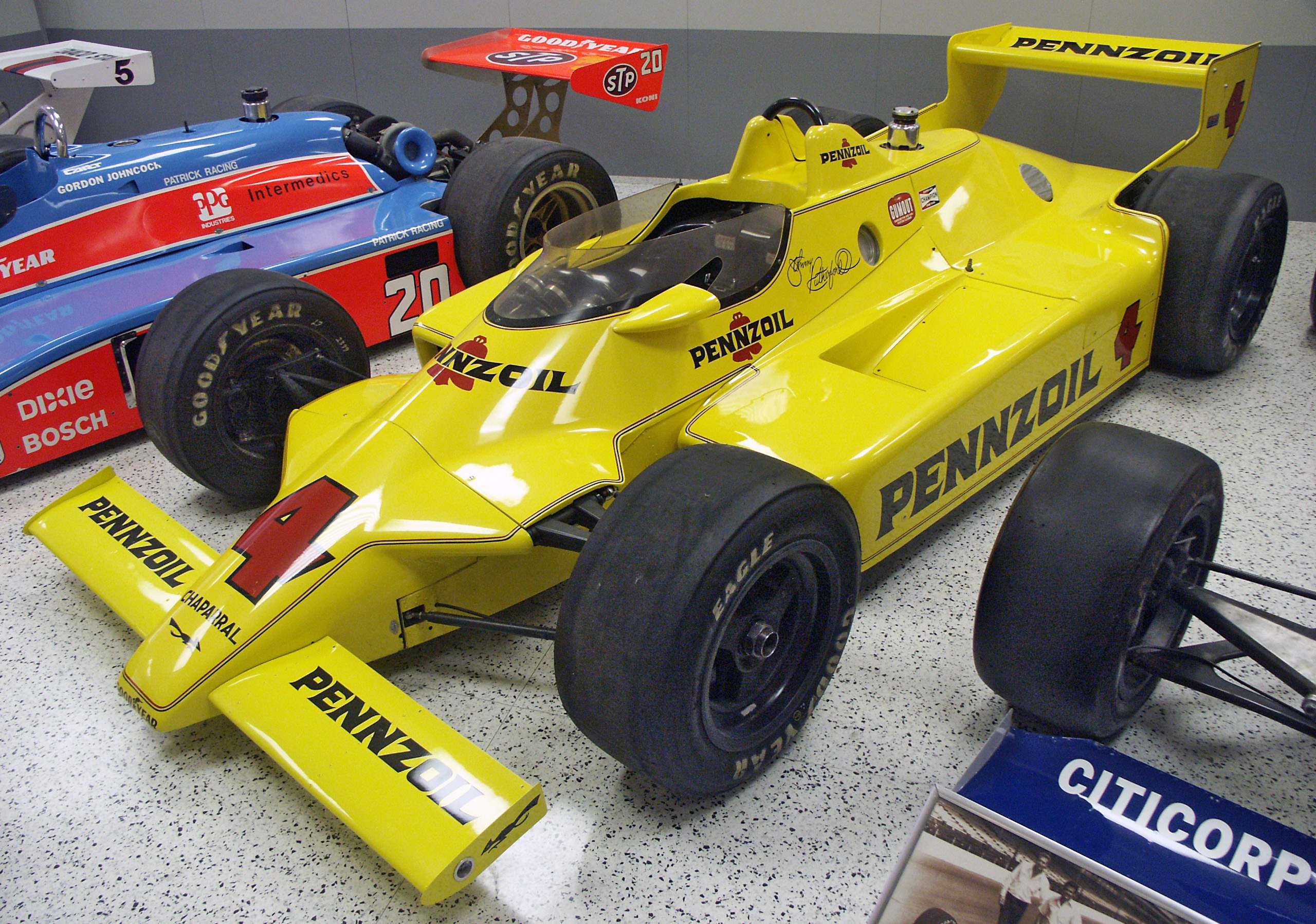

Indianapolis Motor Speedway

Indianapolis 500
- Sanctioning body: USAC
- Season: 1980 USAC season 1980 CART season
- Date: May 25, 1980
- Winner: (United States) Johnny Rutherford
- Winning team: Jim Hall Racing
- Winning Chief Mechanic: Steve Roby
- Time of race: 3:29:59.56
- Average speed: 142.862 mph (229.914 km/h)
- Pole position: (United States) Johnny Rutherford
- Pole speed: 192.256 mph (309.406 km/h)
- Fastest qualifier: (United States) Johnny Rutherford
- Rookie of the Year: (United States) Tim Richmond
- Most laps led: (United States) Johnny Rutherford (118)

Pre-race ceremonies
- National anthem: Purdue band
- "Back Home Again in Indiana": Dr. Richard Smith
- Starting command: Mary F. Hulman
- Pace car: Pontiac Firebird Trans Am
- Pace car driver: Johnnie Parsons
- Starter: Duane Sweeney
- Estimated attendance: 350,000

Television in the United States
- Network: ABC
- Announcers: Host: Chris Schenkel; Lap-by-lap: Jim McKay; Color Analyst: Jackie Stewart
- Nielsen ratings: 13.8 / 27

Chronology
Previous	Next
1979	1981

The 64th 500 Mile International Sweepstakes was held at the Indianapolis Motor Speedway in Speedway, Indiana on Sunday, May 25, 1980. Johnny Rutherford won the pole position, led 118 of 200 laps, and won the race by a commanding margin of 29.92 seconds. After failing to finish the race the year before (with Al Unser behind the wheel), Jim Hall's radical new Chaparral 2K ground effects chassis was a heavy favorite entering the month. With Rutherford now behind the wheel, the team executed a nearly flawless race. Rutherford, the winner in 1974 and 1976, became the sixth driver to win the Indy 500 three times.

Tom Sneva broke an Indy 500 record by becoming the first driver to start last (33rd) and lead the race. Sneva led two times for 16 laps, and finished the race in second position. Sneva likewise became the first driver in Indy history to start last and finish second (a feat tied by Scott Goodyear in 1992). It was Sneva's third runner-up finish in four years, matching Bill Holland's achievement exactly thirty years earlier in 1947, 1948 and 1950. Sneva's efforts were often branded afterwards with a "bridesmaid" reference, until he would finally go on to win the race in 1983.

The starting lineup featured ten rookies, a sharp contrast from 1979, which had only one. For the first time in Indy history, the three drivers that started in the eleventh and final row finished in the top eight — Tom Sneva 2nd, Gary Bettenhausen 3rd, and Tom Bigelow 8th. The race was originally part of the 1980 CRL Championship, a joint sanctioning arrangement between USAC and CART. However, USAC pulled out of the CRL mid-season, and separate championships would be awarded by USAC and CART. Johnny Rutherford continued his domination all season, and he scored the most points under both USAC's five-race points distribution and CART's 12-race points championship, securing what could be considered "undisputed" or "unanimous" top driver honors for the calendar year of 1980.

== Background ==
After the tumultuous and controversial month of May at Indy in 1979, the landscape of Indy car racing was starting to settle into a more civilized fashion. During the offseason, USAC published their 1980 schedule, which featured such races as the Indianapolis 500, Texas World Speedway, Talladega, and Charlotte. Meanwhile, CART released their own schedule. Before the season began, the leaders of USAC and CART jointly formed the new Championship Racing League (CRL) to co-sanction the season of events. Several of the USAC-planned events were scrapped, including Talladega, Charlotte, Mosport, and Road Atlanta, and the two schedules were instead merged.

A major change for 1980 designated the Indianapolis 500 now as an "Invitational" event, rather than an "Open" type event. This was done, in part, to prevent the uproar of denied entries as happened in 1979. Originally the plan was to grant automatic invitations to the teams that competed in all three 500-mile "Triple Crown" races in 1979 (Indianapolis, Pocono, and Ontario). However, that plan was scuttled when only one car (Danny Ongais) fulfilled those conditions, and furthermore when Ontario switched alliances to the CART series. In January 1980, the criteria for receiving an invitation to the Indianapolis 500 was announced, and essentially included any certified team in USAC or CART that was judged to have a realistic intent of making a qualifying attempt. Brand new teams were subject to review, and required written documentation of the operational plans. In general, the new invitational rules would exclude few, if any, teams in Indy car racing, whether they were part of the USAC Trail or the CART series.

The 1980 CART PPG Indy Car World Series began in April, and Indianapolis was the second race of the season. CART awarded points for Indianapolis towards their championship. After Indianapolis, Speedway officials became unhappy with the CRL arrangement. In the middle of July, after a total of five races had been run, USAC would pull out of the CRL.

=== Rule changes ===
Going into the month USAC dropped turbocharger "boost" levels to 48 inHG across the board. Previously the levels were 50 inHG, and before that 80 inHG. The rule change slowed cars down by as much as 8–10 mph (13–16 km/h), and drew the ire of many competitors. Outspoken critics included A. J. Foyt who referred to it as "taxicab racing," and Johnny Rutherford who said it made it difficult to pass other cars.

== Race schedule ==
Race schedule — May, 1980
Sun	Mon	Tue	Wed	Thu	Fri	Sat
				1	2	3 Opening Day
4 Practice	5 Practice	6 Practice	7 Practice	8 Practice	9 Practice	10; Pole Day
11; Time Trials	12; Practice	13; Practice	14; Practice	15; Practice	16; Practice	17; Time Trials
18; Time Trials	19	20	21	22; Carb Day	23; Mini-Marathon	24; Parade
25; Indy 500	26; Memorial Day	27	28	29	30	31

Color	Notes
Green	Practice
Dark Blue	Time trials
Silver	Race day
Red	Rained out*
Blank	No track activity

* Includes days where track
activity was significantly
limited due to rain

== Time trials ==
=== Pole Day – Saturday May 10 ===
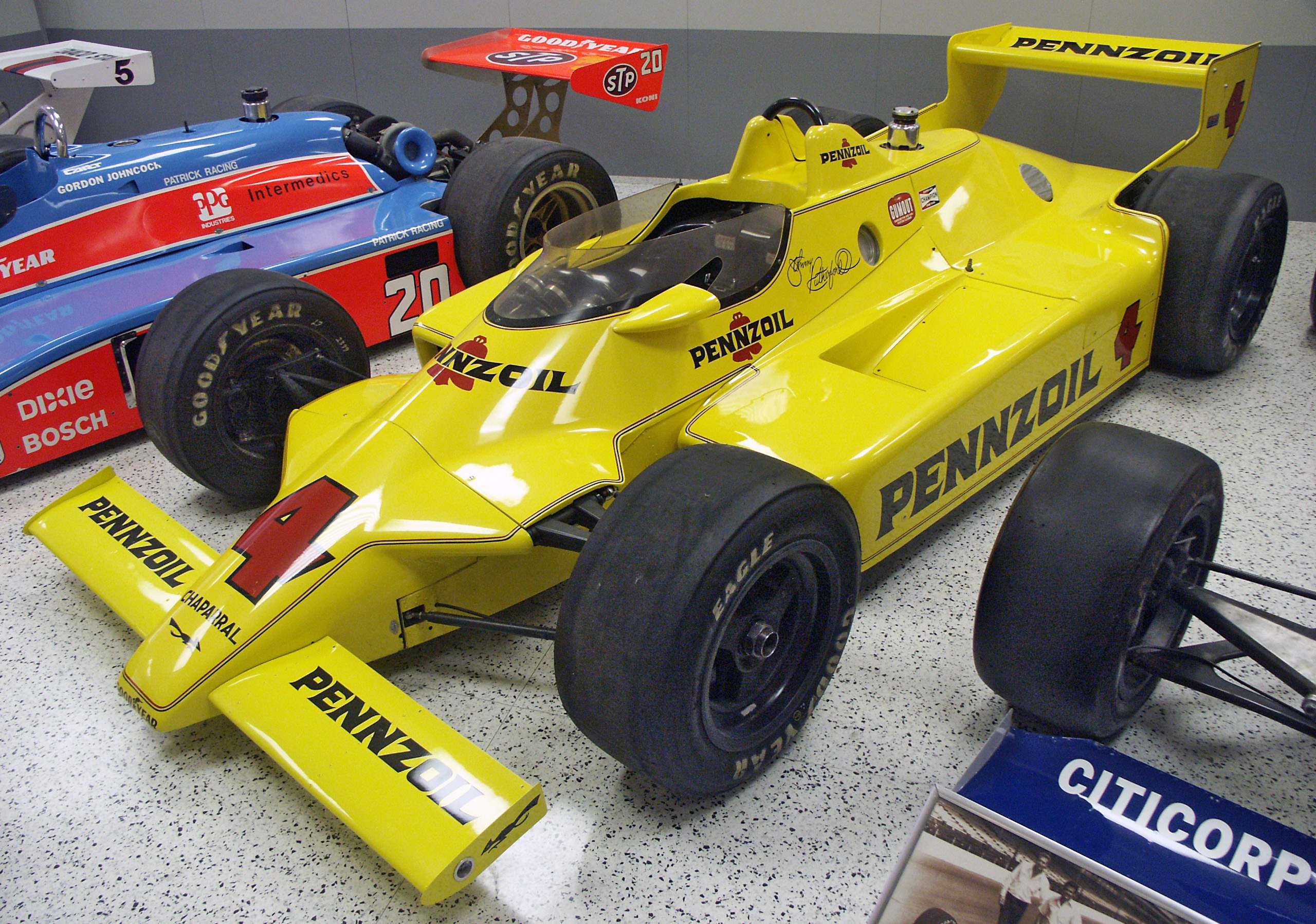
Johnny Rutherford's pole and race-winning Chaparral 2K

The first day of time trials opened with cloudy skies and temperatures in the low 70s (°F). Scattered rain showers were in the forecast. The favorites for the pole included Mario Andretti, Johnny Rutherford, and rookie Tim Richmond. A. J. Foyt was also a dark horse for the front row. Richmond had set the fastest lap of the month (193.507 mph (311.419 km/h)) in practice, but a crash on pole day morning sidelined him for the weekend.

Defending champion and defending pole winner Rick Mears was the first driver out to qualify at 11:00 a.m., and he set the early pace at 187.490 mph (301.736 km/h). An hour later, Spike Gehlhausen (188.344 mph (303.110 km/h)) knocked Mears off the top spot. At 12:45 p.m., Mario Andretti took over the provisional pole with a speed of 191.012 mph (307.404 km/h).

A short rain shower closed the track for 20 minutes.

At 2:08 p.m., Johnny Rutherford in the Jim Hall Chaparral 2K chassis (nicknamed the "Yellow Submarine" due to its bright yellow Pennzoil paint job) took to the track. Rutherford secured the pole position with a four-lap average speed of 192.256 mph (309.406 km/h).

The next car out was Bobby Unser, who squeezed on to the front row with a speed of 189.994 mph (305.766 km/h). A. J. Foyt, took to the track twice – the first attempt he waved off before taking the green flag, and the second attempt was aborted due to a rain shower. After a rain and hail delay of over an hour and a half, Foyt got one last chance to qualify. His speed of 185.500 mph (298.533 km/h) was good enough only for 12th starting position.

At the end of the first day of time trials, the field was filled to 16 cars.

=== Second Day – Sunday May 11 ===
Three cars completed runs, with Danny Ongais (186.606 mph (300.313 km/h)) the fastest of the afternoon. Gordon Johncock, who broke his ankle in a practice crash on Thursday, got in a back-up car to qualify for 18th starting position.

=== Third Day – Saturday May 17 ===
The third day of time trials was rained out. With a starting spot at Indy secured for the middle of the front row, Mario Andretti flew to Monte Carlo for the Monaco Grand Prix. Andretti would finish 3 laps down in 7th, then would return to Indy on Carburetion Day.

Tom Sneva, who had qualified 14th, wrecked his primary car during the second week of practice. His team obtained a back-up car, and Sneva arranged to drive that car in the race. According to the rules, Sneva would move to the rear of the field, and start the race in last (33rd) position.

=== Bump Day – Sunday May 18 ===
The final day of time trials opened with 14 spots open. There were roughly 38 cars in the garage area prepared to qualify, and the day was expected to be busy and hectic.

Non-stop qualifying took place when the track opened at noon. The field was filled to 33 cars by 2:40 p.m. Rookie Tim Richmond was the fastest of the day at 188.334 mph (303.094 km/h), the 5th-fastest car overall in the field. Tony Bettenhausen Jr. (176.410 mph (283.904 km/h)) was the first driver on the bubble.

The bumping began with John Martin bumping out Bettenhausen. In total, seven drivers were bumped by 4 p.m. Eventually, Martin was bumped himself.

With weather starting to enter the area at 4 o'clock, time was running out for qualifying. Gary Bettenhausen (Tony's brother) was now on the bubble. Bettenhausen survived three attempts over the next 15 minutes. At 4:20 p.m., Ron Shuman was lined up to make an attempt, but rain began to fall before he pulled away. Bettenhausen held on to make the field, and the track was closed for the day.

=== Carburetion Day – Thursday May 22 ===
The final practice session before race day saw Mario Andretti set the best lap at 189.954 mph (305.701 km/h). Tom Bagley spun and crashed in turn 3, but he was uninjured. Bill Vukovich blew his engine. A total of 31 of the 33 qualified cars took laps.

Tragedy struck in the infield during the session. Timothy Scott Vail, 19, of Indianapolis, was killed in the infield when his jeep overturned in the notorious "Snake Pit" area of the turn 1 infield. He suffered a fractured skull.

==== Pit Stop Contest ====
The finals for the 4th annual Miller High Life Pit Stop Contest were held on Thursday May 22. For 1980, the contest was expanded from eight participants to twelve. Teams were required to change two tires and simulate a fuel coupling. The top qualifiers were Greg Leffler (15.29 seconds), Ron Schuman (16.56 seconds), Vern Schuppan (16.62 second), and Bill Alsup (18.54 seconds). Other preliminary times posted included Jerry Sneva (20.54 seconds), Phil Caliva (23.20 seconds), and Jim McElreath (37.34 mph). The two cars of the Sherman Armstrong team advanced to the final round. The crew of Tom Bigelow (14.04 seconds) defeated the crew of Greg Leffler (14.50 seconds).

Semifinals
44	Greg Leffler (Sherman Armstrong)	15.07
44	Bill Alsup (Alsup Racing)	17.59
43	Tom Bigelow (Sherman Armstrong)	15.72
43	Phil Caliva (Alsup Racing)	16.02

Finals
43	Tom Bigelow (Sherman Armstrong)	14.04
44	Greg Leffler (Sherman Armstrong)	14.50

== Starting grid ==
Row	Inside		Middle		Outside	
1	4	(United States) Johnny Rutherford W	12	(United States) Mario Andretti W	11	(United States) Bobby Unser W
2	35	(United States) Spike Gehlhausen	7	(United States) Jerry Sneva	1	(United States) Rick Mears W
3	15	(United States) Johnny Parsons	10	(United States) Pancho Carter	5	(United States) Al Unser W
4	66	(United States) Roger Rager R	23	(United States) Jim McElreath	14	(United States) A. J. Foyt W
5	40	(United States) Tom Bagley	95	(United States) Larry Cannon	26	(United States) Dick Ferguson R
6	25	(United States) Danny Ongais	20	(United States) Gordon Johncock W	96	(United States) Don Whittington R
7	21	(United States) Tim Richmond R	70	(United States) Gordon Smiley R	16	(United States) George Snider
8	29	(United States) Billy Engelhart R	44	(United States) Greg Leffler R	18	(Australia) Dennis Firestone R
9	99	(United States) Hurley Haywood R	48	(United States) Mike Mosley	94	(United States) Bill Whittington R
10	38	(United States) Jerry Karl	8	(United States) Dick Simon	2	(United States) Bill Vukovich II
11	43	(United States) Tom Bigelow	46	(United States) Gary Bettenhausen	9	(United States) Tom Sneva†

- † - Tom Sneva qualified 14th on pole day, but afterwards suffered a crash during practice. The car was replaced with a back-up car, and he was moved the rear of the field.

=== Alternates ===
- First alternate: John Martin (#37) – Bumped
- Second alternate: Bill Alsup R (#41) – Bumped

=== Failed to qualify ===
- Salt Walther (#76) – Bumped
- Pete Halsmer R (#34) – Bumped
- Sheldon Kinser (#24) – Bumped
- Tony Bettenhausen Jr. R (#32) – Bumped
- Roger Mears R (#97) – Wave off
- Joe Saldana (#69) – Wave off
- Rick Muther (#82) – Spun out during qualifying attempt
- Bob Harkey (#67) – Incomplete qualifying attempt
- Howdy Holmes (#43, #45) – Incomplete qualifying attempt
- Bill Tempero R (#65) – Incomplete qualifying attempt
- Ron Shuman R (#78) – Incomplete qualifying attempt
- Herm Johnson R (#28) – Incomplete qualifying attempt
- Lee Kunzman (#59) – Incomplete qualifying attempt
- John Mahler (#91) – Incomplete qualifying attempt
- Phil Caliva R (#47) – Incomplete qualifying attempt
- Rich Vogler R (#50) – Mechanical problems on Bump Day
- Phil Threshie (#30) – Too slow to receive qualifying sticker
- Jan Sneva R (#50, #77) – Practice crash
- Frank Weiss R (#68) – Practice crash (fractured knee and ankle)
- Larry Dickson (#80)
- Tom Frantz R (#57)
- Janet Guthrie (#51, #55)
- Jim Hurtubise (#56)
- Al Loquasto (#81)
- Bill Puterbaugh
- Vern Schuppan (#89)
- John Wood R (#42)

== Race summary ==
=== Pre-race ===
Mary F. Hulman gave the command to start engines shortly before 11:00 a.m. With Janet Guthrie failing to qualify, the command reverted to the traditional "Gentlemen, start your engines!" for the first time since 1976.

While sitting on the starting grid, polesitter Johnny Rutherford claims that a lady bug landed on his uniform — and considered it a fortuitous good luck omen.

=== First half ===
At the start, polesitter Johnny Rutherford and Bobby Unser went into turn one side-by-side, with Rutherford taking the lead. Mario Andretti settled into third. Larry "Boom Boom" Cannon and Mike Mosley were both out with engine problems in the first 5 laps.

The first of several cautions came out on lap 4, for a tow-in for Cannon. On lap 9, the yellow was out again for a crash between Bill Whittington and Dick Ferguson. Ferguson hit the inside wall in the southchute hard, sustaining a broken toe. Whittington needed assistance out of his car and suffered a broken right leg. The race was restarted, and after only one lap of green, Spike Gehlhausen crashed in turn 1.

During the sequence of pit stops and yellows, the lead changed hands several times in the first 60 laps. Rookie Tim Richmond led lap 73, then on lap 74, Tom Sneva set an Indy 500 record by leading the race after starting last (33rd). Sneva led the next 11 laps.

After leading 10 laps during the race, Mario Andretti dropped out with engine trouble. It was the first time Mario had led laps during the "500" since his victory in 1969.

=== Second half ===
At the halfway point, 20 cars were still running. Bobby Unser led at the halfway point. Johnny Rutherford, Rick Mears, and Tom Sneva were all in the top five.

Bobby Unser dropped out with turbo failure after 126 laps. Jerry Sneva crashed in turn one on lap 132 while two laps down, suffering a bruised knee. With Unser out, Johnny Rutherford dominated most of the second half, but Tom Sneva and Rick Mears both managed to lead laps, and were far from out-of-contention.

On lap 172, Rick Mears took the lead, with Sneva second, Rutherford third. One final scheduled pit stop remained for the leaders. Rutherford was the first to pit, under green. A. J. Foyt brought out the yellow on lap 177 for stalling in turn 3. Mears held a 20-second lead. Tom Sneva ducked into the pits under the yellow for tires and fuel. One lap later, leader Mears was in the pits. Mears gambled with track position, and took on only fuel. Still under the yellow, Johnny Rutherford assumed the lead, and Mears' strategy failed and he dropped to third.

=== Finish ===
In the final 20 laps, Johnny Rutherford held a comfortable lead over Tom Sneva, and was pulling away at will. Third place was now being dueled out between Gary Bettenhausen and Gordon Johncock. In the final stages, Rick Mears ducked into the pits for an unscheduled stop to change a punctured tire, which dropped him from contention.

With Rutherford cruising to a certain victory, and second-place Sneva also unchallenged, the attention began to focus on the battle for third place. Gordon Johncock was tucked right behind Gary Bettenhausen. Danny Ongais (7th place) was right with them, albeit a lap down. On the final lap, Bettenhausen held a car-length advantage as they approached turn 4. Suddenly, Ongais smacked the outside wall exiting turn four. Johncock attempted a slingshot pass at the line, but Bettenhausen held him off for third place by 0.27 seconds.

Rutherford won his third Indy 500 by a margin of 29.92 seconds over Tom Sneva. Sneva was lauded for charging from last starting position (33rd) to a second-place finish. He became the first driver in Indy history to do so. He missed, by 29 seconds, becoming the first driver in history to win the Indy 500 after starting dead last. Sneva was disappointed by the defeat stating: "The car was good but it looks like no matter how good I am or how good the car is, I will always just be finishing second."

As Rutherford was pulling into the pits off his victory lap, rookie Tim Richmond ran out of fuel and stopped at the head of the mainstretch. Richmond, the future NASCAR star and "hot shot" personality on the circuit, led one lap during the race, was credited with 9th place, and won the rookie of the year. Rutherford stopped next to Richmond's car, and signaled for Richmond to hop on board and ride back to the pits. With much applause from the crowd, Richmond rode in on the sidepod of the winner's machine and the two exchanged congratulatory waves and handshakes.

The race was slowed by a then-record 13 cautions for 65 laps - race records that would stand until 1988 and 1992, respectively.

== Box score ==
Finish	Start	No	Name	Chassis	Engine	Qual	Laps	Status
1	1	4	(United States) Johnny Rutherford W	Chaparral 2K	Cosworth DFX	192.257	200	142.862 mph
2	33	9	(United States) Tom Sneva	McLaren	Cosworth DFX	185.290	200	+29.29 seconds
3	32	46	(United States) Gary Bettenhausen	Wildcat	DGS	182.463	200	+33.34 seconds
4	17	20	(United States) Gordon Johncock W	Penske PC-6	Cosworth DFX	186.075	200	+33.61 seconds
5	6	1	(United States) Rick Mears W	Penske PC-9	Cosworth DFX	187.491	199	-1 lap
6	8	10	(United States) Pancho Carter	Penske PC-7	Cosworth DFX	186.480	199	-1 lap ‡
7	16	25	(United States) Danny Ongais	Parnelli	Cosworth DFX	186.606	199	-1 lap
8	31	43	(United States) Tom Bigelow	Lola T500	Cosworth DFX	182.547	198	-2 laps
9	19	21	(United States) Tim Richmond R	Penske PC-7	Cosworth DFX	188.334	197	-3 laps
10	23	44	(United States) Greg Leffler R	Lola T500	Cosworth DFX	183.749	197	-3 laps
11	22	29	(United States) Billy Engelhart R	McLaren	Cosworth DFX	184.237	193	-7 laps
12	30	2	(United States) Bill Vukovich II	Watson	Offenhauser	182.741	192	-8 laps
13	18	96	(United States) Don Whittington R	Penske	Cosworth DFX	183.927	178	-22 laps
14	12	14	(United States) A. J. Foyt W	Parnelli	Cosworth DFX	185.500	173	Valve
15	21	16	(United States) George Snider	Parnelli	Cosworth DFX	185.386	169	Engine
16	24	18	(Australia) Dennis Firestone R	Penske PC-6	Cosworth DFX	183.701	137	Transmission
17	5	7	(United States) Jerry Sneva	Lola T500	Cosworth DFX	187.852	130	Crash T1
18	25	99	(United States) Hurley Haywood R	Lightning	Chevrolet	183.561	127	Fire
19	3	11	(United States) Bobby Unser W	Penske PC-9	Cosworth DFX	189.994	126	Turbocharger
20	2	12	(United States) Mario Andretti W	Penske PC-9	Cosworth DFX	191.012	71	Engine
21	28	38	(United States) Jerry Karl	McLaren	Chevrolet	183.011	64	Clutch
22	29	8	(United States) Dick Simon	Vollstedt	Offenhauser	182.787	58	Lost wheel
23	10	66	(United States) Roger Rager R	Wildcat	Chevrolet	186.374	55	Crash SC
24	11	23	(United States) Jim McElreath	Penske PC-7	Cosworth DFX	186.249	54	Crash SC
25	20	70	(United States) Gordon Smiley R	Phoenix	Cosworth DFX	186.848	47	Turbocharger
26	7	15	(United States) Johnny Parsons	Lightning	Offenhauser	187.412	44	Piston
27	9	5	(United States) Al Unser W	Longhorn	Cosworth DFX	186.442	33	Cylinder
28	13	40	(United States) Tom Bagley	Wildcat	Cosworth DFX	185.405	29	Pump
29	4	35	(United States) Spike Gehlhausen	Penske PC-7	Cosworth DFX	188.344	20	Crash T1
30	27	94	(United States) Bill Whittington R	Parnelli	Cosworth DFX	183.262	9	Crash T1
31	15	26	(United States) Dick Ferguson R	Penske PC-6	Cosworth DFX	182.880	9	Crash T1
32	26	48	(United States) Mike Mosley	Eagle	Chevrolet	183.449	5	Gasket
33	14	95	(United States) Larry Cannon	Wildcat	DGS	183.253	2	Camshaft

W Former Indianapolis 500 winner

R Indianapolis 500 Rookie

All cars utilized Goodyear tires.

‡ Pancho Carter was penalized one lap for passing the pace car under yellow on lap 58. At the end of the race, Carter was running approximately 20 seconds behind Rutherford; the penalty reduced his standing from 2nd to 6th. Carter's team protested the ruling, claiming he was waved past the pace car, but USAC upheld the penalty.

=== Race statistics ===
Lap Leaders
Laps	Leader
1–15	Johnny Rutherford
16–17	Roger Rager
18	George Snider
19–24	Gordon Johncock
25–30	Bobby Unser
31–35	Gordon Johncock
36–39	Pancho Carter
40–46	Johnny Rutherford
47–56	Mario Andretti
57	Pancho Carter
58–72	Johnny Rutherford
73	Tim Richmond
74–84	Tom Sneva
85–103	Bobby Unser
104–113	Johnny Rutherford
114–116	Rick Mears
117	Bobby Unser
118–142	Johnny Rutherford
143–147	Tom Sneva
148–171	Johnny Rutherford
172–178	Rick Mears
179–200	Johnny Rutherford

Total laps led
Driver	Laps
Johnny Rutherford	118
Bobby Unser	26
Tom Sneva	16
Gordon Johncock	11
Mario Andretti	10
Rick Mears	10
Pancho Carter	5
Roger Rager	2
Tim Richmond	1
George Snider	1

Cautions: 13 for 65 laps (56 minutes, 16 seconds)
Laps	Reason
4–6	Larry Cannon stalled in turn 1
10–18	Bill Whittington, Dick Ferguson crash turn 2
21–24	Spike Gelhausen crash turn 1
30–33	Tom Bagley stalled on backstretch
45–49	Johnny Parsons stalled in turn 1
57–62	Roger Rager and Jim McElreath crash in south chute
72–75	Mario Andretti stalled on backstretch
85–90	Don Whittington spin in turn 4
118–124	Dick Simon lost wheel
132–137	Jerry Sneva crash in turn 1
142–146	Dennis Firestone stalled on backstretch
157–159	Debris
177–179	A. J. Foyt stalled in turn 3

== Broadcasting ==
=== Radio ===
The race was carried live on the IMS Radio Network. Paul Page served as anchor for the fourth year. Lou Palmer reported from victory lane. Rodger Ward, who previously served as a commentator for ABC Sports, joined the crew as "Driver Expert." It was the first time that a former winner served as the expert. This was the last year of Bob Jenkins on the Backstretch. This would be the final year for Darl Wibel on the crew.

The reporting location for turn one was located atop the Southwest Vista grandstand, whereas in other years it was normally in the upper deck of the E Stand.

Indianapolis Motor Speedway Radio Network
Booth Announcers	Turn Reporters	Pit/garage reporters
Chief Announcer: Paul Page; Driver expert: Rodger Ward; Statistician: John DeCamp; Historian: Donald Davidson	Turn 1: Ron Carrell; Turn 2: Howdy Bell; Backstretch: Bob Jenkins; Turn 3: Doug Zink; Turn 4: Darl Wible	Jerry Baker (north pits); Chuck Marlowe (north-center pits); Luke Walton (south-center pits); Lou Palmer (south pits); Bob Forbes (garages/hospital)

=== Television ===
The race was carried in the United States on ABC Sports on a same-day tape delay basis. For the first time, the broadcast was expanded to three hours. Chris Schenkel rode along and reported live from inside one of the pace cars at the start of the race. Sam Posey returned to serve as reporter after missing the 1979 race.

The broadcast has re-aired on ESPN Classic since May 2011.

ABC Television
Booth Announcers	Pit/garage reporters
Host: Chris Schenkel; Announcer: Jim McKay; Color: Jackie Stewart	Chris Economaki; Sam Posey; Dave Diles

== Gallery ==
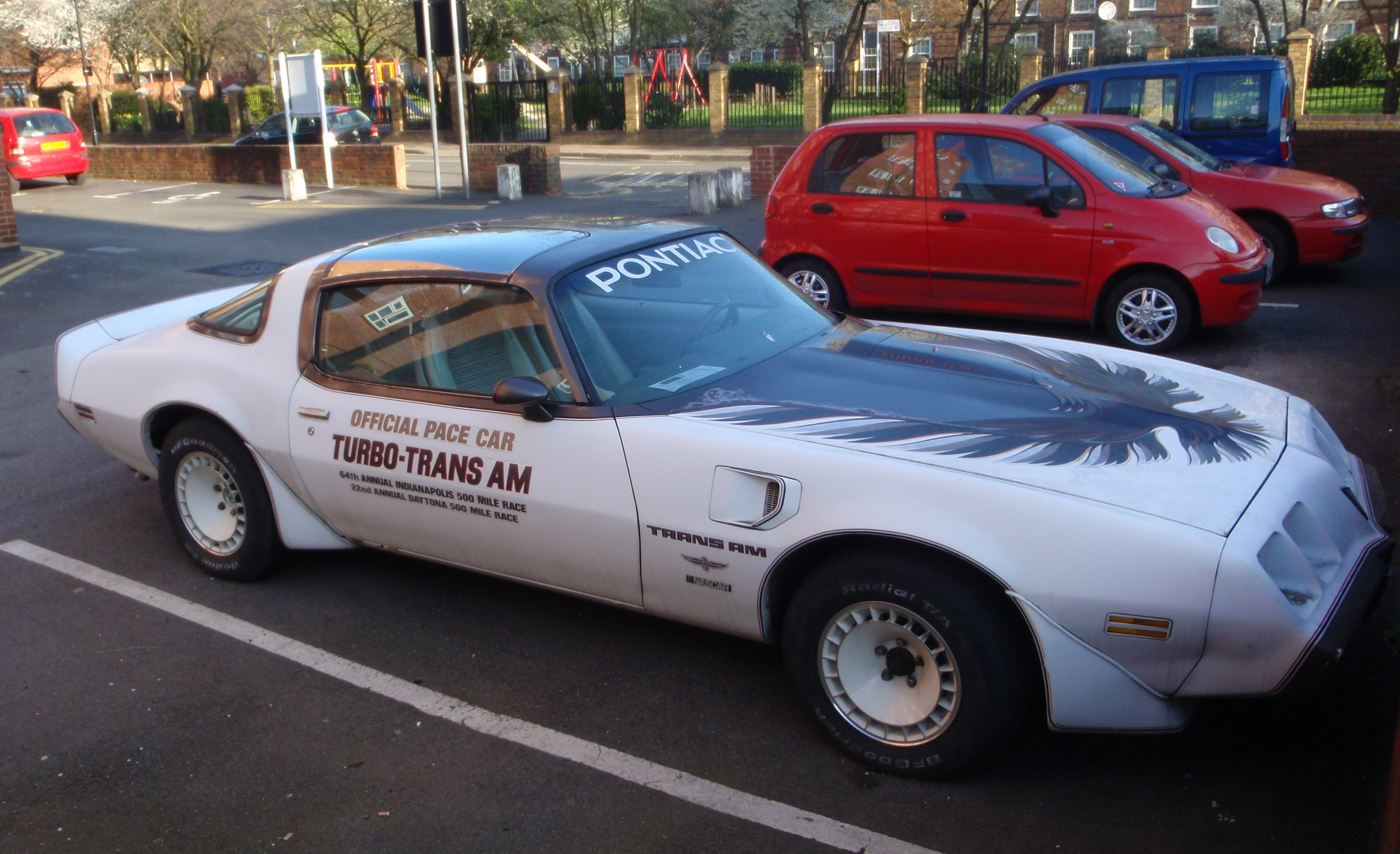
1980 Pontiac Trans Am pace car

== Notes ==
=== See also ===
- 1980 USAC Championship Car season

=== Works cited ===
- 1980 Indianapolis 500 Official Track report 1980
- Indianapolis 500 History: Race & All-Time Stats - Official Site
- 1980 Indianapolis 500 Radio Broadcast, Indianapolis Motor Speedway Radio Network

1979 Indianapolis 500; Rick Mears	1980 Indianapolis 500; Johnny Rutherford	1981 Indianapolis 500; Bobby Unser
