= Duane Sweeney =

American racing official (1922–2004)

- Born: June 19, 1922; Mitchell, South Dakota, US
- Died: January 15, 2004 (aged 81); New Berlin, Wisconsin, US
- Occupation: starter
- Years active: 1951–1996

Duane Sweeney (June 19, 1922 – January 15, 2004) was an American racing official and starter of the Indianapolis 500 from 1980 to 1996.

== Career ==
Sweeney's career as an race official began in late 1940s, working as a club referee for a motor club in Milwaukee before flagging races at Hales Corners Speedway starting in 1951. In 1962, Sweeney began working at the Milwaukee Mile. At a late model stock race in 1973, Sweeney displayed the checkered flag a lap early after a stalled car on the front straight distracted him.

In 1978, Sweeney was named starter for United States Auto Club (USAC) Championship Car Series and Stock Car races after a plane crash killed starter Shim Malone. Sweeney was named starter for the Indianapolis 500 when previous starter Pat Vidan retired in 1979. After retiring in 1996, Sweeney was succeeded by Bryan Howard.

== Flagging style ==
Sweeney popularized the use of waving double green and checkered flags to signal the start and end of a race.

For each Indianapolis 500 worked, Sweeney's wife Mary hand-crafted the flags that he would use during the Indianapolis 500, including hand-sewing the checkered flag. Sweeney preferred to use flags with wooden handles for more grip.

Sweeney believed flagging a race from the ground was more beneficial than from a tower, saying that "you don't see policemen directing traffic...from a helicopter. (...) If you're on the ground, you can control the field when you have to."

== Personal life ==
Prior to being named starter for the Indianapolis 500, Sweeney was involved in a car accident in 1979 and suffered a broken hip, ribs, wrist and arm, a punctured lung, and a fractured skull.

Sweeney died on January 15, 2004 at his home in New Berlin, Wisconsin.

Preceded by Pat Vidan	Starter of the Indianapolis 500; 1980–1996	Succeeded by Bryan Howard
