= Tony Bettenhausen Jr. =

American racing driver (1951–2000)

Tony Bettenhausen, Jr.
- Nationality: (United States) American
- Born: Tony Lee Bettenhausen; October 30, 1951 Joliet, Illinois, U.S.
- Died: February 14, 2000 (aged 48) Harrison County, Kentucky, U.S.

Champ Car career
- 103 races run over 15 years
- Years active: 1979–1993
- Best finish: 6th – 1981
- First race: 1979 Lubrilon Grand Prix (College Station)
- Last race: 1993 Indianapolis 500 (Indianapolis)
| Wins | Podiums | Poles |
|---|---|---|
| 0 | 1 | 0 |

NASCAR Cup Series career
- 33 races run over 3 years
- Best finish: 20th (1974)
- First race: 1973 Atlanta 500 (Atlanta)
- Last race: 1982 Champion Spark Plug 400 (Michigan)
| Wins | Top tens | Poles |
|---|---|---|
| 0 | 1 | 0 |

Tony Lee Bettenhausen Jr. (October 30, 1951 – February 14, 2000) was an American Champ Car team owner and driver who died in a 2000 plane crash. He was the son of former 14-time Indianapolis 500 competitor Tony Bettenhausen and the brother of 21-time Indy 500 racer Gary Bettenhausen. Another brother, Merle Bettenhausen, was critically injured in his only Indy Car start.

== Career ==
As a driver, Bettenhausen started 11 Indianapolis 500 races, scoring a best finish of 7th his rookie year in the 1981 race. He took his trademark No. 16 into team ownership in 1985, initially using March and Lola chassis, then purchasing year-old Penske chassis and then entering and qualifying two new Penskes for the 1993 race. One, number 76, was driven by himself, the other by former Formula One driver Stefan Johansson. A number of successful drivers passed through Bettenhausen's Alumax car, including Johansson for the first few years as well as four-time Indianapolis 500 winner Hélio Castroneves and former IndyCar rookie of the year Patrick Carpentier.

Bettenhausen also competed in 33 NASCAR Winston Cup Series events in his career, most coming in 1974 when he scored a career best 7th-place effort at Richmond International Raceway.

A difficult 1999 plagued by a lack of sponsorship and a series of pay-drivers saw the team take on a new look in 2000 with the hiring of Michel Jourdain Jr. and his Herdez sponsorship.

The family holds the dubious distinction of the most combined starts in the famous race without a victory.

== Death ==
Bettenhausen died in a light plane crash en route from Homestead, Florida to Indianapolis, Indiana that went down in Harrison County, Kentucky. Bettenhausen's wife Shirley, the daughter of former Indianapolis racing star Jim McElreath, as well as business associates Russ Roberts and Larry Rangel were also killed. His legacy of the team lived on under the ownership of former Pacific Racing F1 team owner Keith Wiggins and was renamed Herdez Competition in 2001, with the No. 16 replaced by Herdez's preference for the No. 55 early in 2002. The team has subsequently gone through further changes in ownership, was once Paul Stoddart's Minardi Team USA, and became Wiggins' HVM Racing competing in the IndyCar Series until the end of the 2012 season. On 11 November 2015, the team was listed as up for auction officially listing the team as defunct.

Bettenhausen is buried at Crown Hill Cemetery in Indianapolis.

== Motorsports career results ==
=== NASCAR ===
(key) (Bold – Pole position awarded by qualifying time. Italics – Pole position earned by points standings or practice time. * – Most laps led.)

==== Winston Cup Series ====
NASCAR Winston Cup Series results
| Year | Team | No. | Make | 1 | 2 | 3 | 4 | 5 | 6 | 7 | 8 | 9 | 10 | 11 | 12 | 13 | 14 | 15 | 16 | 17 | 18 | 19 | 20 | 21 | 22 | 23 | 24 | 25 | 26 | 27 | 28 | 29 | 30 | NWCC | Pts | Ref |
|---|---|---|---|---|---|---|---|---|---|---|---|---|---|---|---|---|---|---|---|---|---|---|---|---|---|---|---|---|---|---|---|---|---|---|---|---|
| 1973 | Buster Davis | 84 | Dodge | RSD | DAY | RCH | CAR | BRI | ATL; 40 | NWS | DAR | MAR | | | | | | | | | | | | | | | | | | | | | | 54th | - | |
| 1973 | Gordon Van Liew | 38 | Chevy | | | | | | | | | | TAL; 30 | NSV | CLT | DOV | TWS; 23 | RSD | MCH; 32 | DAY | BRI | ATL | TAL | NSV | DAR | RCH | DOV | NWS | MAR | CLT | CAR; 16 | | | 54th | - | |
| 1974 | Gordon Van Liew | 9 | Chevy | RSD; 17 | DAY; 33 | RCH; 12 | CAR; 19 | BRI; 29 | ATL | DAR; 18 | NWS; 14 | MAR; 29 | TAL; 30 | NSV; 23 | DOV; 34 | CLT; 21 | RSD; 31 | MCH; 36 | | BRI; 26 | NSV; 11 | ATL; 24 | POC; 27 | TAL; 32 | MCH; 25 | DAR; 11 | RCH; 7 | DOV; 15 | NWS; 25 | MAR; 14 | CLT | | | 20th | 601.69 | |
| 1974 | Langley Racing | 64 | Ford | | | | | | | | | | | | | | | | DAY; 14 | | | | | | | | | | | | | | | 20th | 601.69 | |
| 1974 | Ulrich Racing | 40 | Chevy | | | | | | | | | | | | | | | | | | | | | | | | | | | | | CAR; 20 | ONT | 20th | 601.69 | |
| 1982 | Gordon Racing | 24 | Buick | DAY | RCH | BRI | ATL | CAR | DAR | NWS | MAR | TAL | NSV | DOV | CLT | POC | RSD | MCH | DAY | NSV | POC | TAL | MCH; 24 | BRI | DAR | RCH | DOV | NWS | CLT | MAR | CAR | ATL | RSD | NA | 0 | |

===== Daytona 500 =====
| Year | Team | Manufacturer | Start | Finish |
|---|---|---|---|---|
| 1974 | Gordon Van Liew | Chevrolet | 26 | 33 |

=== American Open-Wheel racing results ===
==== USAC Championship Car ====
(key) (Races in bold indicate pole position)

| Year | Team | 1 | 2 | 3 | 4 | 5 | 6 | 7 | Rank | Points |
|---|---|---|---|---|---|---|---|---|---|---|
| 1979 | Gilmore Racing | ONT | TWS; 9 | INDY | MIL; 9 | POC; 13 | TWS; 13 | MIL; 15 | **17th** | **185** |

==== PPG Indycar Series ====
PPG Indycar Series results
| Year | Team | Chassis | Engine | 1 | 2 | 3 | 4 | 5 | 6 | 7 | 8 | 9 | 10 | 11 | 12 | 13 | 14 | 15 | 16 | 17 | Pos. | Pts | Ref |
|---|---|---|---|---|---|---|---|---|---|---|---|---|---|---|---|---|---|---|---|---|---|---|---|
| 1980 | Medlin Racing | Eagle | Offenhauser t | ONT | INDY; DNQ | MIL; DNQ | POC; 32 | | | | | | | | | | | | | | 63rd | 5 | |
| 1980 | Agajanian Grant King Racers | Kingfish 73 | Chevrolet V8 | | | | | MDO; DNQ | MCH | WGL; DNS | MIL | ONT | MCH | MEX | PHX | | | | | | 63rd | 5 | |
| 1981 | Bettenhausen Racing | McLaren | Cosworth DFX V8t | PHX | MIL; 12 | ATL; 7 | ATL; 11 | MCH; 2 | RIV; DNS | | | | MEX; 11 | PHX; 19 | | | | | | | 6th | 107 | |
| 1981 | Bettenhausen Racing | Longhorn LR-1 | Cosworth DFX V8t | | | | | | | MIL; 14 | | | | | | | | | | | 6th | 107 | |
| 1981 | Bettenhausen Racing | Phoenix | Cosworth DFX V8t | | | | | | | | MCH; 10 | WGL; 8 | | | | | | | | | 6th | 107 | |
| 1982 | Bettenhausen Racing | March 82C | Cosworth DFX V8t | PHX; 12 | ATL; 19 | MIL; 12 | CLE | MCH; 10 | | POC; 5 | RIV; 18 | ROA; 7 | MCH; 4 | PHX; 6 | | | | | | | 10th | 80 | |
| 1982 | Bettenhausen Racing | Phoenix | Cosworth DFX V8t | | | | | | MIL; 20 | | | | | | | | | | | | 10th | 80 | |
| 1983 | Bettenhausen Racing | March 83C | Cosworth DFX V8t | ATL; 10 | INDY; 17 | MIL; 10 | | MCH; 18 | | POC; 10 | RIV; 8 | | MCH; 9 | CPL; 21 | | PHX; 18 | | | | | 17th | 19 | |
| 1983 | Bettenhausen Racing | March 83P | Cosworth DFX V8t | | | | CLE; 18 | | ROA; 12 | | | MDO; 14 | | | LAG; 14 | | | | | | 17th | 19 | |
| 1984 | Provimi Veal Racing | March 84C | Cosworth DFX V8t | LBH; DNQ | PHX; 22 | INDY; 26 | MIL | POR | MEA | CLE | MCH; 15 | ROA | POC; 16 | MDO | SAN | MCH | PHX | LAG | CPL | | NC | 0 | |
| 1985 | All American Racers | Lola T900 | Cosworth DFX V8t | LBH | INDY; 29 | MIL | POR | MEA | CLE | MCH | ROA | POC | MDO | SAN | MCH | LAG | PHX | MIA | | | 59th | 0 | |
| 1986 | Bettenhausen Racing | March 86C | Cosworth DFX V8t | PHX | LBH | INDY; 28 | MIL | POR | MEA | CLE | TOR | MCH | POC | MDO | SAN | MCH | ROA | LAG | PHX | MIA | 50th | 0 | |
| 1987 | Bettenhausen Racing | March 86C | Cosworth DFX V8t | LBH; 11 | PHX; 15 | INDY; 10 | MIL; DNQ | POR | MEA; 13 | CLE; 20 | TOR; DNQ | MCH; 11 | POC; 22 | ROA; 15 | MDO; 25 | NAZ | LAG | MIA | | | 29th | 7 | |
| 1988 | Bettenhausen Racing | Lola T8700 | Cosworth DFX V8t | PHX; 6 | LBH; DNQ | INDY; 33 | | | CLE; 15 | | | MCH; 4 | POC; 15 | MDO; 16 | ROA; 16 | | LAG; 26 | MIA | | | 17th | 25 | |
| 1988 | Bettenhausen Racing | March 86C | Cosworth DFX V8t | | | | MIL; 19 | POR | | TOR; 17 | MEA; 8 | | | | | | | | | | 17th | 25 | |
| 1988 | Bettenhausen Racing | Lola T8700 | Judd AV | | | | | | | | | | | | | NAZ; 13 | | | | | 17th | 25 | |
| 1989 | Leader Card Racing | Lola T8900 | Cosworth DFX V8t | PHX | LBH | INDY; DNQ | MIL | DET | POR | CLE | MEA | TOR | MCH | | | | | | | | 50th | 0 | |
| 1989 | Dale Coyne Racing | Lola T8900 | Cosworth DFX V8t | | | | | | | | | | | POC; 26 | MDO | ROA | NAZ | LAG | | | 50th | 0 | |
| 1990 | Bettenhausen Racing | Lola T8700 | Cosworth DFX V8t | PHX | LBH; DNQ | | | | | | | | | | | MDO; 20 | ROA; DNS | NAZ; 22 | LAG | | 24th | 4 | |
| 1990 | Bettenhausen Racing | Lola T8700 | Buick 3300 V6t | | | INDY; 26 | MIL; 13 | DET; 16 | POR; 17 | CLE; 12 | MEA; 10 | TOR; 26 | MCH; 22 | DEN; 24 | VAN | | | | | | 24th | 4 | |
| 1991 | Bettenhausen Racing | Penske PC-19 | Chevrolet 265A V8t | SRF; 10 | LBH; 12 | PHX; 18 | INDY; 9 | MIL; 12 | DET; 13 | POR; 13 | CLE; 13 | MEA; 21 | TOR; 11 | MCH; 5 | DEN; 10 | VAN; 18 | MDO; 18 | ROA; 13 | NAZ; 10 | LAG; 16 | 14th | 27 | |
| 1992 | Bettenhausen Racing | Penske PC-20 | Chevrolet 265A V8t | SRF; 13 | PHX; 11 | LBH; 15 | INDY; DNQ | DET | POR; 21 | MIL; 18 | NHA | TOR | MCH; 9 | CLE | ROA | VAN | MDO | NAZ | LAG | | 24th | 6 | |
| 1993 | Bettenhausen Racing | Penske PC-22 | Chevrolet 265C V8t | SRF | PHX | LBH | INDY; 20 | MIL | DET | POR | CLE | TOR | MCH | NHA | ROA | VAN | MDO | NAZ | LAG | | 47th | 0 | |

==== Indianapolis 500 ====
| Year | Chassis | Engine | Start | Finish |
|---|---|---|---|---|
| 1980 | Eagle | Offy | Failed to Qualify | |
| 1981 | McLaren | Cosworth | 16th | 7th |
| 1982 | March | Cosworth | 27th | 26th |
| 1983 | March | Cosworth | 9th | 17th |
| 1984 | March | Cosworth | 17th | 26th |
| 1985 | Lola | Cosworth | 29th | 29th |
| 1986 | March | Cosworth | 18th | 28th |
| 1987 | March | Cosworth | 27th | 10th |
| 1988 | Lola | Cosworth | 24th | 33rd |
| 1989 | Lola | Cosworth | Failed to Qualify | |
| 1990 | Lola | Buick | 13th | 26th |
| 1991 | Penske | Chevrolet | 20th | 9th |
| 1992 | Penske | Chevrolet | Failed to Qualify | |
| 1993 | Penske | Chevrolet | 22nd | 20th |
