= Larry Cannon (racing driver) =

American racing driver

- Born: 13 April 1937; Danville, Illinois, United States
- Died: 6 November 1995 (aged 58); Danville, Illinois, United States

Larry Cannon (April 13, 1937 – November 6, 1995) was an American race car driver.

Born in Danville, Illinois, Cannon also died there in 1995, after suffering an embolism. He drove in the USAC and CART Championship Car series, racing in the 1970-1971 and 1973-1981 seasons, with 44 combined career starts, including the Indianapolis 500 in 1974, 1976, and 1980. He finished in the top-ten seven times, with his best finish in eighth position in 1976 at both College Station and Michigan International Speedway.

Cannon did not qualify for the 1977 Indianapolis 500, but did compete as a relief driver. In the final ten laps, Cannon took over the car of John Mahler, and drove it to the finish. He prided himself as being one of only a handful of drivers to be on the track at the moment A. J. Foyt won his record fourth Indy 500.

For the three times Cannon qualified for the Indianapolis 500 (1974, 1976, 1980), Johnny Rutherford won the race all three times.

Cannon was commonly known by his nickname Larry "Boom Boom" Cannon, and was a barber by trade.

== Indianapolis 500 results ==
Year	Chassis	Engine	Start	Finish
1971	Philipp/Porter	Ford	Failed to Qualify	
1973	Eagle	Offy	Failed to Qualify	
1974	Eagle	Offy	33rd	24th
1975	Eagle	Offy	Failed to Qualify	
1976	Eagle	Offy	10th	17th
1977	Eagle	Foyt	Failed to Qualify / Drove relief	
1978	Wildcat	DGS	Failed to Qualify	
1979	Wildcat	Offy	Failed to Qualify	
1980	Wildcat	DGS	14th	33rd
1981	Penske	Cosworth	Failed to Qualify	
1983	Vollstedt	Offy	Failed to Qualify	
1984	Rattlesnake	Cosworth	Practice Crash	
