= Frank Weiss =

Canadian racing driver (1944–2014)

Frank Weiss (July 25, 1944 in Cardston, Alberta – January 31, 2014 in Plainfield, Indiana) was a Canadian racecar driver. He competed in the USAC and CART Championship Car series.

Weiss made his Champ Car debut in 1975 at Milwaukee. He returned the following year to race at Milwaukee and Michigan. In 1978, he attempted to qualify for the fall Phoenix race but failed to qualify. 1979 was his most active year as the CART/USAC split ruptured champ car racing and Weiss competed in the USAC events at Ontario, both Milwaukee races, and Pocono Raceway and the September CART race at Atlanta Motor Speedway. He registered a career-best finish of 7th in the August race at Milwaukee and finished 16th in the 1979 USAC National Championship.

== Indianapolis 500 attempts ==
Weiss attempted to qualify for his first Indianapolis 500 in 1979 but failed to complete rookie orientation. The following year, Weiss returned to Indianapolis and finished orientation but failed to make the field. During practice, he suffered a crash, and had to sit out the month with a fractured knee and ankle. Weiss failed to qualify at Indianapolis in 1981 as well, in what would be his final attempt at a Champ Car race.
