= Bubby Jones =

American racing driver (1941–2020)

Norman Jones (June 4, 1941 – January 18, 2020), known as Bubby Jones, was a driver in the USAC Sprint Car series, with 22 victories, and a member of the National Sprint Car Hall of Fame, inducted in 1998. He also raced in the USAC Championship Car series, in the 1977–1978 seasons, with two career starts, including the 1977 Indianapolis 500. He failed in qualifying attempts at Indy in 1978 and 1981.

In 1980 "Ol' Bub" headed west to run in the prestigious California Racing Association (C.R.A.) Sprint Car Series as a regular, driving the Gas Chem Products Entry. After finishing second in the C.R.A. Point Standings three years in a row (1980–82) behind Dean Thompson, Jones persuaded car owner Dan Kazarian to change from the Stanton Chassis they had been running, and to let Jones build them a new car himself. The result was Jones winning two consecutive C.R.A. Point Series Championships (1983–84). In 1984, Jones won the coveted Pacific Coast National Open at Ascot, holding off a fast closing Steve Kinser despite blistering the right rear tire with ten laps to go. Jones died Saturday night, January 18, 2020, at the age of 78.

== Racing record ==
=== Complete USAC Mini-Indy Series results ===
Year	Entrant	1	2	3	4	5	6	7	8	9	10	Pos	Points
1978		PIR1; DNS	TRE1; 17	MOS	MIL1	TEX	MIL2	OMS1	OMS2	TRE2	PIR2	55th	6
