= 1980 CART PPG Indy Car World Series =

American motorsport season

1980 CART season
- PPG Indy Car World Series
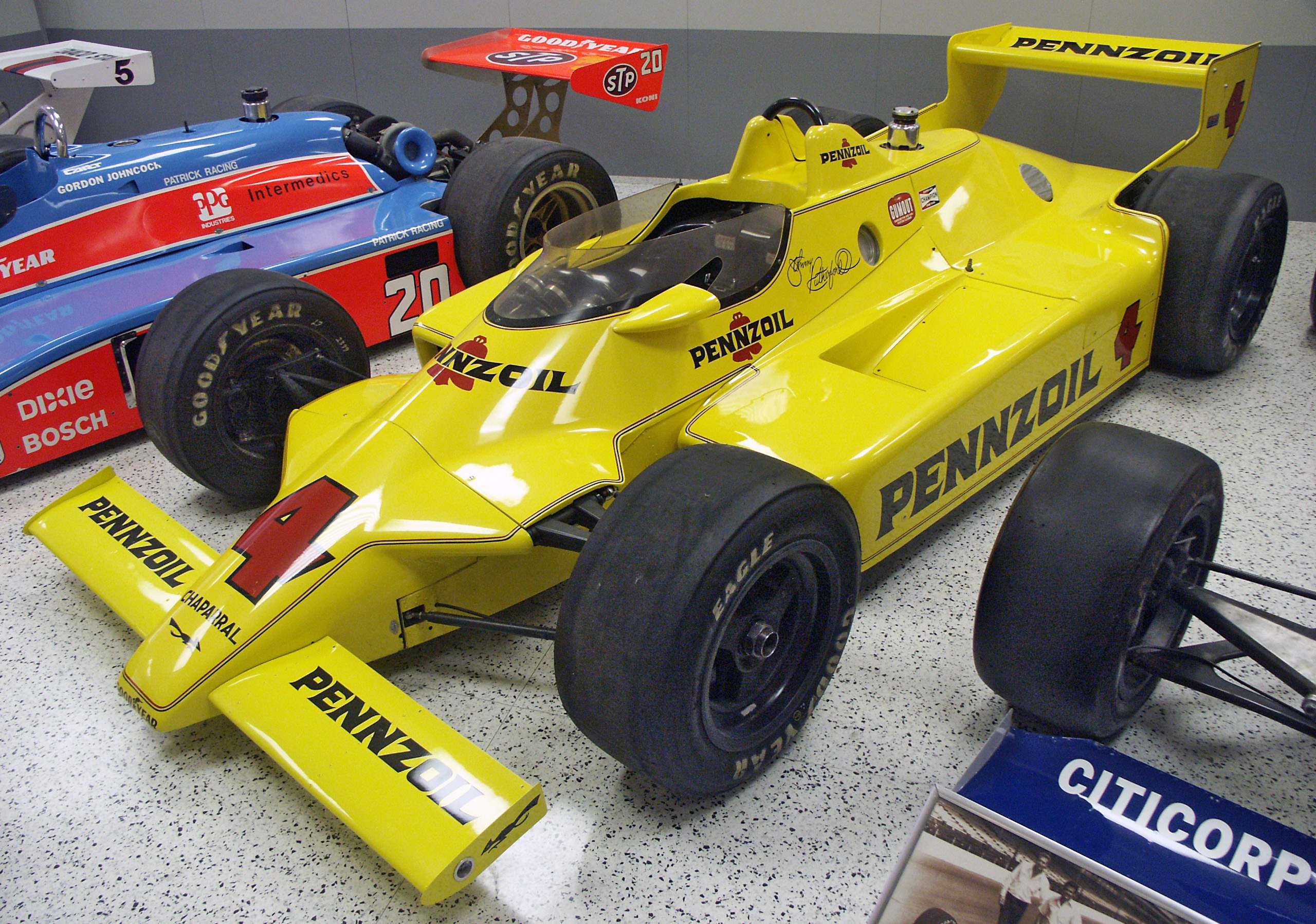
- Champion: Johnny Rutherford

Season
- Races: 12
- Start date: April 13
- End date: November 8

Awards
- Drivers' champion: (United States) Johnny Rutherford
- Constructors' Cup: (United States) Penske
- Manufacturers' Cup: (United Kingdom) Cosworth
- Nations' Cup: United States
- Rookie of the Year: (Australia) Dennis Firestone
- Indianapolis 500 winner: (United States) Johnny Rutherford

The 1980 CART PPG Indy Car World Series season was the second in the CART era of U.S. open-wheel racing. It consisted of twelve races, beginning in Ontario, California on April 13 and concluding in Avondale, Arizona on November 8. The PPG Indy Car World Series Drivers' Champion and Indianapolis 500 winner was Johnny Rutherford. Rookie of the Year was Dennis Firestone.

One year after the first open wheel "Split", USAC and CART came together under the banner of the Championship Racing League (CRL). The entire season was supposed to be co-sanctioned by CART and USAC. However, USAC pulled out the CRL arrangement in July after only five races. USAC declared their 1980 season over, while CART finished out the remainder of the 1980 season on their own.

The season-opening race at Phoenix, set for March 2, was cancelled due to local flooding and washed out roads.

Johnny Rutherford in Jim Hall's Chaparral 2K ground effects chassis dominated the season. Rutherford won five races, including a dominating performance at the 1980 Indianapolis 500. Rutherford finished in the top five in the first ten races, pulling out to a commanding and unmatchable points lead. Rutherford started the season out by finishing 1st or 2nd in the first six races, and ended with a total of eight finished of 1st or 2nd. Rutherford's season was not without incident, however. In the final race of the season at Phoenix, while battling Tom Sneva for the lead, Rutherford tangled with a lapped car, hit the wall, then flipped over. The car landed upside-down hard on its rollbar, but Rutherford was not seriously injured. Rutherford happened to score the most points under both USAC's five-race points distribution and CART's 12-race points championship, securing what could be considered "undisputed" or "unanimous" top driver honors for the calendar year of 1980.

== Drivers and constructors ==
The following teams and drivers competed for the 1980 CART World Series.

Team/Car Owner	Chassis	Engine	#	Drivers	Rounds
(United States) Team Penske	Penske	Cosworth	1	(United States) Rick Mears	All
(United States) Team Penske	Penske	Cosworth	11	(United States) Bobby Unser	All
(United States) Team Penske	Penske	Cosworth	12	(United States) Mario Andretti	2, 4, 10, 12
(United States) Team Penske	Penske	Cosworth	61	(United States) Tom Gloy	5, 9–10
(United States) Leader Card Racing	Watson (2–4, 8–10, 12) Eagle (1)	Offenhauser	2	(United States) Bill Vukovich II	2–4, 9–10, 12
(United States) Leader Card Racing	Watson (2–4, 8–10, 12) Eagle (1)	Offenhauser	2	(United States) Sheldon Kinser	8
(United States) Leader Card Racing	Watson	Offenhauser (1, 7) Cosworth (All other races)	24	(United States) Sheldon Kinser	All except 8
(United States) Leader Card Racing	Watson	Offenhauser (1, 7) Cosworth (All other races)	24	(United States) Bill Vukovich II	8
(United States) AMI Racing	Lola (2, 4) Orbiter (3) McLaren (8)	Cosworth	7	(United States) Jerry Sneva	2–4, 8
(United States) AMI Racing	Orbiter (3–10) Lola (12)	Cosworth	43	(United States) Tom Bigelow	4, 8
(United States) AMI Racing	Orbiter (3–10) Lola (12)	Cosworth	43	(United States) Howdy Holmes	3-7
(United States) AMI Racing	Orbiter (3–10) Lola (12)	Cosworth	43	(United States) Jerry Sneva	9
(United States) AMI Racing	Orbiter (3–10) Lola (12)	Cosworth	43	(United States) Danny Ongais	10
(United States) AMI Racing	Orbiter (3–10) Lola (12)	Cosworth	43	(United States) Greg Leffler	12
(United States) AMI Racing	Lola	Cosworth	44	(United States) Greg Leffler	2, 4, 9–10
(United States) AMI Racing	Wildcat (All except 1, 11–12) Orbiter (12)	DGS (All except 1, 9, and 11–12) Offenhauser (11) Cosworth (12)	46	(United States) Gary Bettenhausen	All except 1 and 11
(United States) Chaparral Cars	Chaparral	Cosworth	4	(United States) Johnny Rutherford	All
(United States) Longhorn Racing	Longhorn	Cosworth	5	(United States) Al Unser	All
(United States) Jerry O'Connell Racing	McLaren	Cosworth	7	(United States) Tom Sneva	1
(United States) Jerry O'Connell Racing	McLaren (All except 1, 8, 10, 12) Phoenix (8, 10, 12)	Cosworth	9	(United States) Tom Sneva	2–12
(United States) Jerry O'Connell Racing	McLaren	Cosworth	89	(Australia) Vern Schuppan	2
(United States) Vollstedt Enterprises	Vollstedt	Offenhauser	8	(United States) Dick Simon	All except 1, 10, 12
(United States) Vollstedt Enterprises	Vollstedt	Offenhauser	12	(United States) Dick Simon	12
(United States) Alex Morales Motorsports	Penske (All except 4) Lightning (4)	Cosworth	10	(United States) Pancho Carter	All
(United States) Gilmore Racing	Parnelli	Cosworth	14	(United States) A. J. Foyt	1–2, 4
(United States) Gilmore Racing	Parnelli	Cosworth	16	(United States) George Snider	2, 4
(United States) Tempero Racing	Eagle	Chevrolet	15	(United States) Bill Tempero	1
(United States) Tempero Racing	Eagle	Chevrolet	65	(United States) Bill Tempero	All except 1, 4
(United States) Lindsey Hopkins Racing	Lightning	Offenhauser (2) Chevrolet (10) Cosworth (9)	15	(United States) Johnny Parsons	2, 9–10
(United States) Lindsey Hopkins Racing	Lightning	Chevrolet	51	(United States) Johnny Parsons	4, 6
(United States) Lindsey Hopkins Racing	Lightning	Cosworth	55	(United States) Janet Guthrie	2–3
(United States) Lindsey Hopkins Racing	Lightning	Chevrolet	99	(United States) Hurley Haywood	2
(United States) McElreath Racing	Eagle	Offenhauser	16	(United States) Jim McElreath	11
(United States) McElreath Racing	Penske	Cosworth	23	(United States) Jim McElreath	2, 7–8
(United States) Rhoades Competition	Penske	Cosworth	18	(Australia) Dennis Firestone	2, 4, 6, 9–12
(United States) Rhoades Competition	McLaren	Offenhauser	19	(United States) Dana Carter	2
(United States) Rhoades Competition	Eagle	Ram	X	(United States) Larry Rice	12
(United States) Patrick Racing	Wildcat (1–2, 6) Phoenix (All except 1–2, 6)	Cosworth	20	(United States) Gordon Johncock	All
(United States) Patrick Racing	Penske (1) Wildcat (2, 4, 6, 9–10) Phoenix (3, 5, 7–8, 11–12)	Cosworth	40	(United States) Tom Bagley	All
(United States) Patrick Racing	Penske	Cosworth	60	(United States) Gordon Smiley	1
(United States) Patrick Racing	Phoenix	Cosworth	70	(United States) Gordon Smiley	2
(United States) Mach I Racing	Penske (2–6, 8) Eagle (9)	Cosworth (2–6, 8) Chevrolet (9)	21	(United States) Tim Richmond	2–6
(United States) Mach I Racing	Penske (2–6, 8) Eagle (9)	Cosworth (2–6, 8) Chevrolet (9)	21	(United States) Mike Mosley	8-9
(United States) Davis Racing	Wildcat	Offenhauser	22	(United States) Ross Davis	1
(United States) Sanett Racing	Penske	Cosworth	23	(United States) Dick Ferguson	1
(United States) Sanett Racing	Penske	Cosworth	26	(United States) Dick Ferguson	2
(United States) Interscope Racing	Parnelli	Cosworth	25	(United States) Danny Ongais	All except 1, 8, 10, and 12
(United States) Menard Racing	Lightning	Offenhauser	28	(United States) Herm Johnson	All except 5–7
(United States) Beaudoin Racing	McLaren	Cosworth	29	(United States) Billy Engelhart	2–4, 8–9, 12
(United States) Machinists Union Racing	IAM	Donovan (2–4, 6) DGS (8) Chevrolet (9, 12)	30	(United States) Phil Threshie	2–4, 6, 8
(United States) Machinists Union Racing	IAM	Donovan (2–4, 6) DGS (8) Chevrolet (9, 12)	30	(United States) Larry Dickson	9, 12
(United States) Medlin Racing	Eagle	Offenhauser	32	(United States) Tony Bettenhausen Jr.	2–4
(United States) Wysard Racing	Wildcat (1–2, 4–5, 7) McLaren (9, 12)	Offenhauser (1) DGS (2, 4–5, 7) Cosworth (9, 12)	34	(United States) Pete Halsmer	1–2, 12
(United States) Wysard Racing	Wildcat (1–2, 4–5, 7) McLaren (9, 12)	Offenhauser (1) DGS (2, 4–5, 7) Cosworth (9, 12)	34	(Australia) Vern Schuppan	4-5, 7, 9
(United States) Bob Fletcher Racing	Penske	Cosworth	35	(United States) Spike Gehlhausen	2, 4, 6, 8–9
(United States) Bob Fletcher Racing	Penske	Cosworth	35	(United States) Gordon Smiley	10-11
(United States) Bob Fletcher Racing	Penske	Cosworth	55	(United States) Spike Gehlhausen	1
(United States) J J Enterprises	Wildcat	DGS	36	(United States) John Martin	5
(United States) J J Enterprises	Wildcat	DGS (2, 6, 8–9) Cosworth (4)	37	(United States) John Martin	2, 4, 6, 8–9
(United States) Pacific Coast Racing	Penske	Cosworth	38	(United States) Rick Muther	1
(United States) Pacific Coast Racing	Penske	Cosworth	82	(United States) Rick Muther	2–3, 5–7, 9
(United States) Pacific Coast Racing	Lightning	Offenhauser	86	(United States) Al Loquasto	2, 4
(United States) Pacific Coast Racing	Lightning	Offenhauser	86	(United States) Jeff Heywood	9
(United States) Karl Racing	McLaren (2, 4–6); Gerhardt (3); Karl (7–9, 11–12)	Chevrolet	38	(United States) Jerry Karl	All except 1, 10
(United States) Alsup Racing	Penske	Cosworth	41	(United States) Bill Alsup	All
(United States) Alsup Racing	McLaren	Offenhauser	47	(United States) Phil Caliva	1–2, 4–5, 9, 11
(United States) Mergard Racing	Eagle	Offenhauser	42	(United States) John Wood	1–2, 4–5, 8
(United States) All American Racers	Eagle	Cosworth (1) Chevrolet (2, 4)	48	(United States) Mike Mosley	1–2, 4
(United States) BFM Enterprises	Antares	Offenhauser	50	(United States) Jan Sneva	1
(United States) BFM Enterprises	Manta	Offenhauser	50	(United States) Rich Vogler	2
(United States) BFM Enterprises	Manta	Offenhauser	50	(United States) Dick Ferguson	3
(United States) BFM Enterprises	Manta	Offenhauser	50	(United States) Milt Harper	4
(Mexico) Garza Racing	Penske	Cosworth	55	(Mexico) Josele Garza	12
(United States) Hurtubise Racing	Mallard	Offenhauser	56	(United States) Jim Hurtubise	2
(United States) Frantz Racing	McLaren	Cosworth	57	(United States) Tom Frantz	2
(United States) Hoffman Racing	Lightning	Offenhauser	59	(United States) Lee Kunzman	2
(United States) Hoffman Racing	Lightning	Offenhauser	59	(United States) Joe Saldana	4-6, 8, 10
(United States) Hoffman Racing	Penske	Cosworth	69	(United States) Joe Saldana	1–2
(United States) Hoffman Racing	Eagle	Offenhauser	69	(United States) Bob Frey	10
(United States) Hoffman Racing	Spyder	Offenhauser	79	(United States) Bob Frey	4
(United States) Rager Racing	Wildcat	Chevrolet	66	(United States) Roger Rager	All except 1, 3, 7, and 10
(Canada) Rasmussen Racing	Rascar	Foyt	67	(United States) Bob Harkey	2
(Canada) Rasmussen Racing	Rascar	Foyt	67	(Canada) Buddie Boys	4
(Canada) Rasmussen Racing	McLaren	Offenhauser	68	(Canada) Frank Weiss	2
(United States) Vetrock Racing	Eagle	Offenhauser	71	(United States) Dean Vetrock	8
(United States) Hodgdon Racing	McLaren	Cosworth	72	(United States) Roger Mears	1
(United States) Hodgdon Racing	McLaren	Cosworth	72	(United States) Mike Chandler	9
(United States) Stanton Racing	Penske	Cosworth	75	(United States) Ron Shuman	1–2
(United States) O'Hanlon Racing	March	Chevrolet	75	(United States) Bruce Hill	3
(United States) O'Hanlon Racing	McLaren	Cosworth	75	(United States) Lee Kunzman	5
(United States) O'Hanlon Racing	McLaren	Cosworth	81	(Canada) Cliff Hucul	3
(United States) O'Hanlon Racing	McLaren	Cosworth	81	(United States) Lee Kunzman	4
(United States) O'Hanlon Racing	McLaren	Cosworth	81	(United States) Jerry Sneva	10, 12
(United States) O'Hanlon Racing	McLaren	Cosworth	81	(United States) Spike Gehlhausen	11
(United States) Walmotor	Penske	Cosworth	81	(United States) Salt Walther	2
(United States) Walmotor	Penske	Cosworth	77	(United States) Salt Walther	6
(United States) RP Racing	X	X	80	(United States) Larry Dickson	2
(United States) Woodward Racing	McLaren	Cosworth (9) Chevrolet (6)	81	(United States) Dick Ferguson	6, 9
(United States) Shade Tree Racing	Eagle	Offenhauser	85	(Mexico) Michel Jourdain Sr.	11–12
(Mexico) Pronosticos Deportivos	Penske	Cosworth	88	(Mexico) Daniel Muñiz	11
(United States) Intercomp	Finley (2) Eagle (9)	Offenhauser	91	(United States) John Mahler	2
(United States) Intercomp	Finley (2) Eagle (9)	Offenhauser	91	(United States) Chip Mead	9
(United States) Intercomp	Eagle (3) Penske (5, 7–9, 11)	Offenhauser	92	(United States) John Mahler	3, 5, 7–9, 11
(Mexico) Ovaciones	Penske	Cosworth	91	(Mexico) Juan Carlos Bolaños	11
(United States) Whittington Bros. Racing	Parnelli	Cosworth	94	(United States) Bill Whittington	2
(United States) Whittington Bros. Racing	Penske	Cosworth	96	(United States) Don Whittington	2, 4
(United States) Cannon Racing	Wildcat	DGS (1–2, 6–7, 9–12); Offenhauser (3–5, 8)	95	(United States) Larry Cannon	All except 1 and 11.
(United States) Grant King Racing	King	Chevrolet	86	(United States) Roger Mears	5
(United States) Grant King Racing	King	Chevrolet	97	(United States) Roger Mears	2, 7–8
(United States) Grant King Racing	King	Chevrolet	97	(United States) Billie Harvey	3
(United States) Grant King Racing	King	Chevrolet	97	(United States) Jim McElreath	4
(United States) Grant King Racing	King	Chevrolet	97	(United States) Jerry Miller	12
(United States) Grant King Racing	King	Chevrolet	98	(United States) Bob Harkey	4
(United States) Grant King Racing	King	Chevrolet	98	(United States) Tony Bettenhausen Jr.	5, 7

=== Notable team and driver changes ===
- After racing only at Indy in 1979, Leader Card Racing moved from USAC to CART, with Sheldon Kinser as lead driver and Bill Vukovich II running a limited schedule.
- AMI Racing also moved from USAC to CART, with Gary Bettenhausen as the driver.
- Team McLaren shut down their IndyCar operations so they could concentrate on their Formula One program. Driver Johnny Rutherford moved to Chaparral Cars, replacing Al Unser.
- With Al Unser out at Chaparral, he moved to Longhorn Racing, replacing Tom Bagley.
- Vollstedt Enterprises, which only ran Indy the previous year, moved to a full schedule, driven by Dick Simon.
- Rookie driver Bill Tempero debuted with owner-driver team Tempero Racing.
- Wally Dallenbach Sr. retired from CART at the end of the 1979 season, becoming its competition director. His ride at Patrick Racing was filled by Tom Bagley.
- John Menard Jr. formed the new Team Menard organization, with Herm Johnson as the driver.
- Jerry Karl moved from USAC to CART, with his owner-driver team Karl Racing.
- Alsup Racing expanded to a two-car team, with Bill Alsup joined in most races by Phil Caliva.
- After running a full season in 1979, All American Racers and driver Mike Mosley only ran three races in 1980.
- Hoffman Racing once again fielded a variety of drivers, with Lee Kunzman, Joe Saldana, and Bob Frey splitting the year.
- Roger Rager moved his owner-driver team Rager Racing from USAC to CART.
- After competing in most of the 1979 races, Salt Walther and team Walmotor only raced in two races.
- Larry Cannon and his Cannon Racing team moved to a full-time schedule after running part-time in 1979.
- Gehlhausen Racing, which fielded a full-time team in 1979, closed, with driver Spike Gehlhausen moving to Bob Fletcher Racing.

=== Notable equipment changes ===
- Longhorn Racing switched from a Penske chassis to its own Longhorn.
- Morales Motorsports switched from a Lightning chassis to a used Penske.
- Patrick Racing switched from a Penske to Phoenix chassis.
- Bob Fletcher Racing switched from a Lightning to Penske chassis.
- Alsup Racing switched from a McLaren to Penske chassis and from an Offenhauser to Cosworth engine.

== Schedule ==
CART announced an initial 13-race schedule on October 3, 1979, down from 14 races in 1979. After the creation of the Championship Racing League, a new, 12-race schedule was announced on May 6, 1980, combining seven events from the initial CART calendar with five others that were previously included in USAC's schedule.

Icon	Legend
O	Oval/Speedway
R	Road course

Rd	Date	Name	Circuit	Location	Original sanctioning body
1	April 13 (Note: Originally scheduled for March 3, moved to April 13 due to promotional and logistical reasons.)	Datsun Twin 200	O Ontario Motor Speedway	Ontario, California	CART
2	May 25	Indianapolis 500	O Indianapolis Motor Speedway	Indianapolis, Indiana	USAC
3	June 8	Gould Rex Mays Classic	O Milwaukee Mile	West Allis, Wisconsin	USAC
4	June 22	True Value 500	O Pocono Raceway	Long Pond, Pennsylvania	USAC
5	July 13	Red Roof Inns 250	R Mid-Ohio Sports Car Course	Lexington, Ohio	USAC
6	July 20	Norton Twin 200	O Michigan International Speedway	Brooklyn, Michigan	CART
7	August 3	Kent Oil 150	R Watkins Glen International	Watkins Glen, New York	CART
8	August 10	Tony Bettenhausen Classic	O Milwaukee Mile	West Allis, Wisconsin	USAC
9	August 31	California 500	O Ontario Motor Speedway	Ontario, California	CART
10	September 20	Gould Grand Prix	O Michigan International Speedway	Brooklyn, Michigan	CART
11	October 26	Copa México 150	R Autódromo Hermanos Rodríguez	Mexico City, Mexico	CART
12	November 8	Miller High Life 150 in Memory of Bobby Ball	O Phoenix International Raceway	Avondale, Arizona	CART

=== Schedule changes ===
The Indianapolis 500 was initially absent from the schedule, as negotiations between CART and USAC were being held. All double-header events at Atlanta, Trenton and Michigan were simplified to a single race. The Datsun Twin 200, which had been a USAC event in 1979, joined the schedule after Ontario Motor Speedway had changed its allegiances for the California 500 during the previous season. A new international race at the Autodromo Hermanos Rodriguez was scheduled, as well as a date at Sears Point Raceway, which was renamed in early 1980 as the Golden State International Raceway, with the track potentially making its Indy Car return since its lone USAC race in 1970.

All three of the CART races that were scheduled prior to the Indianapolis 500 suffered postponements or cancellations, due to different circumstances:

- The season opener at Phoenix, originally scheduled for March 2, was first postponed on February 18 to an April 20 date due to access road damage in the Salt River floods. It was later re-scheduled for April 6, and eventually postponed indefinitely on March 17.
- The first race at Ontario, originally scheduled for March 9, was postponed on February 11 to an April 13 date for promotional and logistical reasons.
- The Rich's Indy Atlanta Classic, originally scheduled for April 27, was cancelled on March 10 due to the Ontario and Phoenix races being postponed to April dates.

As a result of this, the April 4, 1980 agreement between CART and USAC to form the Championship Racing League came before any of the two series had started their season. A compromise was reached to keep races as scheduled until a new set of common races was drafted, though the USAC-sanctioned Texas 200 was cancelled shortly before being held. On May 6, the Championship Racing League announced that eleven of the remaining 19 races would stay on the combined schedule. Among CART-sanctioned events, both dates at Trenton Speedway were discontinued, with the track being auctioned the following month and subsequently dismantled. The new event at Sears Point and the second Atlanta race were also off the new schedule.

With the Championship Racing League partnership being dissolved on June 30, CART announced shortly after its intention to become the sanctioning body for the rest of the season. It was decided to keep the Mid-Ohio race as the last one under CRL sanctioning, while the Milwaukee Mile, which was the lone remaining venue under USAC sanctioning for the season, switched to CART sanctioning on July 8.

==== Cancelled events ====
Race name	Track	City	Original date
Arizona Republic/Jimmy Bryan 150	O Phoenix International Raceway	Avondale, Arizona	April 6 (Note: Originally scheduled for March 2, first postponed to April 20.)
Texas 200	O Texas World Speedway	College Station, Texas	April 26
Rich's Indy Atlanta Classic	O Atlanta International Raceway	Hampton, Georgia	April 27
Trenton Twin Indy	O Trenton Speedway	Trenton, New Jersey	June 8
Trenton 150	O Trenton Speedway	Trenton, New Jersey	August 17
Atlanta 150	O Atlanta International Raceway	Hampton, Georgia	October 5
Sears Point Grand Prix	R Golden State International Raceway	Sonoma, California	October 12

== Results ==
Rd	Race	Pole position	Most laps led	Race winner				Report
Rd	Race	Pole position	Most laps led	Driver	Team	Chassis	Engine	Report
1	Ontario 200	(United States) Johnny Rutherford	(United States) Johnny Rutherford	(United States) Johnny Rutherford	Chaparral Cars	Chaparral 2K	Cosworth	
2	Indianapolis 500	(United States) Johnny Rutherford	(United States) Johnny Rutherford	(United States) Johnny Rutherford	Chaparral Cars	Chaparral 2K	Cosworth	Report
3	Milwaukee 1	(United States) Gordon Johncock	(United States) Gordon Johncock	(United States) Bobby Unser	Team Penske	Penske PC-9/80	Cosworth	
4	Pocono	(United States) Bobby Unser	(United States) Bobby Unser	(United States) Bobby Unser	Team Penske	Penske PC-9/80	Cosworth	Report
5	Mid-Ohio	(United States) Al Unser	(United States) Rick Mears	(United States) Johnny Rutherford	Chaparral Cars	Chaparral 2K	Cosworth	
6	Michigan 200	(United States) Bobby Unser	(United States) Johnny Rutherford	(United States) Johnny Rutherford	Chaparral Cars	Chaparral 2K	Cosworth	
7	Watkins Glen	(United States) Al Unser	(United States) Rick Mears	(United States) Bobby Unser	Team Penske	Penske PC-9/80	Cosworth	
8	Milwaukee 2	(United States) Johnny Rutherford	(United States) Al Unser	(United States) Johnny Rutherford	Chaparral Cars	Chaparral 2K	Cosworth	
9	California 500	(United States) Bobby Unser	(United States) Bobby Unser	(United States) Bobby Unser	Team Penske	Penske PC-9/80	Cosworth	Report
10	Michigan GP	(United States) Mario Andretti	(United States) Mario Andretti	(United States) Mario Andretti	Team Penske	Penske PC-9/80	Cosworth	
11	Mexico City	(United States) Bobby Unser	(United States) Rick Mears	(United States) Rick Mears	Team Penske	Penske PC-9/80	Cosworth	
12	Phoenix	(United States) Mario Andretti	(United States) Tom Sneva	(United States) Tom Sneva	Jerry O'Connell Racing	Phoenix	Cosworth	

=== Race summaries ===
Race 1: Datsun Twin 200

For the opening race of the year, Johnny Rutherford qualified on the pole, with Bobby Unser, Al Unser, Rick Mears, and Tom Sneva making up the rest of the top five starters.

Johnny Rutherford led the first eight laps, before Bobby Unser caught and passed in lap traffic. However, while leading on lap 14, he suffered a cracked radiator and dropped out. This moved Rutherford back in front, and he was mostly uncontested for the remainder of the race as most challengers had problems. Rick Mears dropped out due to electrical issues while running second. Pancho Carter moved up to second, but he dropped out with fuel pump problems, followed by Al Unser dropping out on lap 45 with a broken transmission. With most of his competition out, Rutherford cruised to an easy victory over Tom Sneva. Gordon Johncock finished third, Spike Gehlhausen fourth, and Tom Bagley fifth.

Race 2: Indianapolis 500

Race 3: Rex Mays Classic

Gordon Johncock qualified on the pole, with Johnny Rutherford starting second, Al Unser starting third, Rick Mears starting fourth, and Bobby Unser rounding out the top five starters.

In the race Rutherford jumped out to the lead on lap 7, and controlled most of the next 50 laps before Gordon Johncock took the lead on lap 55. 60 laps later, under the fourth caution of the day, Al Unser, who was running in second had an engine failure and dropped out. This moved his brother Bobby Unser into second, and on the restart he managed to catch and pass Johncock for the lead, holding on to win. Johnny Rutherford rose to second, Gordon Johncock ended up third, Pancho Carter finished fourth, and Rick Mears fifth.

With his second place, Rutherford now had a 400-point lead over second place Tom Sneva, with Gordon Johncock 550 points back in third, Gary Bettenhausen 925 points back in fourth, and Rick Mears 984 points behind in fifth.

Race 4: True Value 500

Bobby Unser won the pole, with A.J. Foyt starting second, Mario Andretti starting third, Mike Mosley starting in fourth, and Johnny Rutherford starting fifth.

In the race, A.J. Foyt took the lead on the first lap, and led most of the first half of the race, giving up the lead only for pit shuffling. The first caution came on lap 11, when Al Loquasto lost a wheel and Dennis Firestone wrecked in the same part of the track. The second caution came on lap 26, after Howdy Holmes lost control, Jim McElreath slowed and Roger Rager hit the rear of his car.

While leading on lap 82, Foyt encountered a bad valve, and dropped out. This gave the lead to Bobby Unser, who led most of the rest of the race. Johnny Rutherford led 1 lap due to pit stop shuffling, followed by 5 laps under caution after Pancho Carter spun, but when the green flag flew after a caution on lap 165, Unser pulled away. Rutherford's hopes of winning ended with 20 laps to go when his engine stalled in the pits, allowing Unser to win the race by a wide margin over Rutherford. Tom Sneva finished third, Bill Alsup fourth, and Vern Schuppan fifth. Most other stars were taken out due to attrition. Al Unser was never a factor and dropped out with handling problems on lap 35. Mike Mosley broke a piston while running in third on lap 46, Danny Ongais dropped out with clutch problems on lap 100, Mario Andretti was sidelined with a broken transmission on lap 105, and Rick Mears blew his engine on lap 163.

Johnny Rutherford extended his lead to 500 points over Tom Sneva, with Bobby Unser rising to third, 1114 points behind, Gordon Johncock, who didn't enter, falling to fourth, 1350 points back, and Pancho Carter rising to fifth, 1452 points behind.

Race 5: Red Roof Inns 250

Al Unser qualified on the pole, followed by brother Bobby Unser in second, Rick Mears in third, Johnny Rutherford in fourth, and Danny Ongais rounding out the top five starters.

The start of the race was problematic. Starter Duane Sweeney didn't give the green flag when the pace car pulled off as the back rows were strung out, but the field got going anyway, with Al Unser spinning off track in the first turn. Two laps later they got back in two-by-two order for the official start. Danny Ongais and Sheldon Kinser didn't make it to the green flag, with Ongais having ignition problems and Kinser a blown engine. On the first lap, Tim Richmond spun off course and was hit by John Wood.

Bobby Unser jumped out to the lead after his brother spun, and led the first 12 laps, But he encountered a valve problem while leading and dropped out. Rick Mears then took the lead, and throughout the next 20 laps dueled with Johnny Rutherford. After a poor pit stop by Rutherford, Mears had a 20-second lead, but due to heat exhaustion lost concentration and spun out while leading on lap 47. This gave the lead to Rutherford, with Mears's day ending on lap 54 after Rick Muther spun out and Mears hit him. This brought out the caution, allowing second place Gordon Johncock to close. But when the green flew, Rutherford pulled away and won, a rare road course win. Bill Alsup finished third, Roger Mears fourth, and Vern Schuppan fifth. Polesitter Al Unser lost a lap due to an unscheduled pit stop, and dropped out with suspension problems while running fifth.

Rutherford now had a 770-point lead over Tom Sneva, who had crashed out. Bobby Unser was third, 1406 points back, Gordon Johncock fourth, 1410 points back, and Pancho Carter fifth, 1662 points back.

== Points standings ==
Pos	Driver	ONT (United States)	INDY (United States)	MIL (United States)	POC (United States)	MOH (United States)	MIS (United States)	WGL (United States)	MIL (United States)	ONT (United States)	MIS (United States)	MXC (Mexico)	PHX (United States)	Pts
1	(United States) Johnny Rutherford	**1***	**1***	2	2	1	1*	5	**1**	2	4	10	13	4723
2	(United States) Bobby Unser	23	19	1	**1***	15	**2**	1	3	**1***	2	**2**	Wth	3714
3	(United States) Tom Sneva	2	2	6	3	11	6	4	16	26	6	4	1*	2930
4	(United States) Rick Mears	21	5	5	12	9*	4	2*	2	3	3	1*	7	2866
5	(United States) Pancho Carter	18	6	4	6	7	3	7	22	7	7	22	19	1855
6	(United States) Gordon Johncock	3	4	**3***	Wth	2	5	21	23	23	24	19	24	1572
7	(United States) Bill Alsup	7	DNQ	9	4	3	10	8	21	16	10	16	21	1214
8	(United States) Al Unser	16	27	20	24	**13**	7	**19**	13*	4	5	3	15	1153
9	(United States) Gary Bettenhausen		3	12	33	20	9	11	DNS	31	19		3	1057
10	(Australia) Vern Schuppan		DNQ		5	5		18		10				806
11	(United States) Tom Bagley	5	28	23	29	DNS	8	6	4	15	8	18	16	794
12	(Australia) Dennis Firestone RY		16		30		14			6	DNS	5	5	743
13	(United States) Sheldon Kinser	13	DNQ	11	7	24	16	20	17	12	14	7	4	697
14	(United States) Tom Gloy R					6				5	9			680
15	(United States) Danny Ongais		7	24	18	21	21	3		19	11	24		601
16	(United States) Mario Andretti		20		17						**1***		**2**	580
17	(United States) Spike Gehlhausen	4	29		Wth		12		5	33		25		473
18	(United States) Roger Rager		23		26	8	24		8	11		11	10	381
19	(United States) Rick Muther	24	DNQ	18		10	25	10		8				356
20	(United States) Bill Tempero R	17	DNQ	16		17	17	15	6	18	16	8	11	331
21	(United States) Dick Ferguson	8	31	Wth			13			9		Wth		315
22	(United States) Howdy Holmes R		DNQ	15	8	14	11	13		Wth				314
23	(United States) Larry Cannon		33	Wth	9	Wth	20		DNQ	24	22	9	18	299
24	(United States) Roger Mears R	9	DNQ			4		16	26					272
24	(United States) Herm Johnson	14	DNQ	17	11				11	13	13	14	8	272
26	(United States) Tom Bigelow		8						14					260
27	(United States) Billy Engelhart		11	10	13		Wth		10	28			17	246
28	(United States) Jim McElreath		24		27			12	9			6		240
29	(United States) Jerry Karl		21	14	15	18	15	9	24	27		12	9	215
30	(United States) Tim Richmond		9	DNS		22	26							209
31	(United States) Dick Simon		22	13	21	DNS	18	17	7	37		23	25	185
32	(United States) Greg Leffler R		10							20	15		20	184
33	(United States) Gordon Smiley R	6	25								20	Wth		176
34	(United States) Lee Kunzman		DNQ		10	Wth								150
35	(United States) Jerry Sneva		17	8	14				25	36	12		23	149
36	(United States) Pete Halsmer R	20	DNQ										6	128
37	(United States) Bill Vukovich II		12	21	28				19	34	25		12	96
38	(Canada) Cliff Hucul			7										90
39	(United States) Phil Caliva R	15	DNQ		16	12				21		21		70
40	(United States) Jan Sneva R	10	Wth											60
41	(United States) John Martin		DNQ		20	16	19		15	25				56
41	(United States) Mike Mosley	19	32		23				20	17				56
43	(United States) Joe Saldana	25	DNQ		22	Wth	23		12		21			50
44	(United States) A. J. Foyt	DNS	14		19									45
45	(United States) Ron Shuman R	11	DNQ											40
46	(United States) Johnny Parsons		26		DNQ		22			22	23			36
47	(United States) John Mahler		DNQ	DNQ		19		14	18	30		13		35
48	(United States) John Wood R	12	DNQ			23			DNQ					25
48	(United States) Don Whittington R		13											25
48	(United States) Mike Chandler R									14				25
48	(United States) George Snider		15		Wth									25
52	(United States) Hurley Haywood R		18											20
53	(United States) Phil Threshie		DNQ	22	25		Wth		DNQ					15
54	(United States) Larry Dickson									35			22	10
55	(United States) Jerry Miller R												14	8
55	(Mexico) Daniel Muñiz R											15		8
57	(United States) Bob Frey R				Wth						17			6
57	(Mexico) Juan Carlos Bolaños R											17		6
57	(United States) Salt Walther		DNQ								18			6
57	(Mexico) Michel Jourdain R											18	DNQ	6
57	(United States) Billie Harvey R			19										6
57	(United States) Ross Davis R	22												6
63	(United States) Chip Mead R									29				5
63	(United States) Bill Whittington R		30											5
63	(United States) Al Loquasto		DNQ		31									5
63	(United States) Tony Bettenhausen Jr.		DNQ	DNQ	32	DNQ		DNS						5
63	(United States) Jeff Heywood R									32				5
-	(United States) Bob Harkey		DNQ		DNQ				QL^{†}					0
-	(United States) Janet Guthrie		DNQ	DNQ										0
-	(United States) Rich Vogler		DNQ											0
-	(United States) Tom Frantz		DNQ											0
-	(United States) Bill Puterbaugh		DNQ											0
-	(United States) Bruce Hill R			DNQ										0
-	(United States) Larry Rice												DNQ	0
-	(Canada) Frank Weiss		Wth											0
-	(United States) Dana Carter		Wth											0
-	(United States) Milt Harper R				Wth									0
-	(United States) Dean Vetrock R								Wth					0
-	(Mexico) Josele Garza R												Wth	0
Pos	Driver	ONT (United States)	INDY (United States)	MIL (United States)	POC (United States)	MOH (United States)	MIS (United States)	WGL (United States)	MIL (United States)	ONT (United States)	MIS (United States)	MXC (Mexico)	PHX (United States)	Pts

Color	Result
Gold	Winner
Silver	2nd place
Bronze	3rd place
Green	4th & 5th place
Light Blue	6th-10th place
Dark Blue	Finished (Outside Top 10)
Purple	Did not finish
Red	Did not qualify (DNQ)
Brown	Withdrawn (Wth)
Black	Disqualified (DSQ)
White	Did not start (DNS)
Blank	Did not participate (DNP)
Blank	Not competing

**In-line notation**
**Bold**	Pole position
Italics	Ran fastest race lap
*	Led most race laps
RY	Rookie of the Year
R	Rookie

=== Driver Breakdown ===
Pos	Driver	Team/Car Owner	Starts	Wins	Podiums	Top 5s	Top 10s	Poles	Points
1	(United States) Rutherford	(United States) Chaparral Cars	12	5	8	10	10	3	4,723
2	(United States) B. Unser	(United States) Team Penske	11	4	8	8	8	3	3,714
3	(United States) T. Sneva	(United States) Jerry O'Connell Racing	12	1	4	6	9	0	2,930
4	(United States) Ri. Mears	(United States) Team Penske	12	1	5	8	9	0	2,866
5	(United States) Carter	(United States) Alex Morales Motorsports	12	0	1	2	8	0	1,855
6	(United States) Johncock	(United States) Patrick Racing	11	0	3	5	5	1	1,572
7	(United States) Alsup	(United States) Alsup Racing	11	0	1	2	7	0	1,214
8	(United States) A. Unser	(United States) Longhorn Racing	12	0	1	3	4	2	1,153
9	(United States) G. Bettenhausen	(United States) AMI Racing	9	0	2	2	3	0	1,149
10	(Australia) Schuppan	(United States) Jerry O'Connell Racing (United States) Wysard Racing	4	0	0	2	3	0	806
11	(United States) Bagley	(United States) Patrick Racing	11	0	0	2	5	0	794
12	(Australia) Firestone	(United States) Rhoades Competition	6	0	0	2	3	0	743
13	(United States) Kinser	(United States) Leader Card Racing	11	0	0	1	3	0	697
14	(United States) Gloy	(United States) Team Penske	3	0	0	1	3	0	680
15	(United States) Ongais	(United States) Interscope Racing (United States) AMI Racing	9	0	0	1	2	0	601
16	(United States) Andretti	(United States) Team Penske	4	1	2	2	2	3	580
17	(United States) Gehlhausen	(United States) Bob Fletcher Racing	6	0	0	2	2	0	473
18	(United States) Rager	(United States) Rager Racing	8	0	0	0	2	0	381
19	(United States) Muther	(United States) Pacific Coast Racing	6	0	0	0	2	0	356
20	(United States) Tempero	(United States) Tempero Racing	10	0	0	0	2	0	331
21	(United States) Ferguson	(United States) Sanett Racing	4	0	0	0	2	0	315
22	(United States) Holmes	(United States) AMI Racing	5	0	0	0	1	0	314
23	(United States) Cannon	(United States) Cannon Racing	7	0	0	0	2	0	299
24	(United States) Johnson	(United States) Menard Racing	8	0	0	0	1	0	272
24	(United States) Ro. Mears	(United States) Hodgdon Racing (United States) Agajanian-Grant King Racers	4	0	0	1	2	0	272
26	(United States) Bigelow	(United States) AMI Racing	2	0	0	0	1	0	260
27	(United States) Engelhart	(United States) Beaudoin Racing	6	0	0	0	2	0	246
28	(United States) McElreath	(United States) McElreath Racing	5	0	0	0	2	0	240
29	(United States) Karl	(United States) Karl Racing	10	0	0	0	1	0	215
30	(United States) Richmond	(United States) Mach I Racing	3	0	0	0	1	0	209
31	(United States) Simon	(United States) Vollstedt Enterprises	10	0	0	0	1	0	185
32	(United States) Leffler	(United States) AMI Racing	4	0	0	0	1	0	184
33	(United States) Smiley	(United States) Patrick Racing (United States) Bob Fletcher Racing	3	0	0	0	1	0	176
34	(United States) Kunzman	(United States) O'Hanlon Racing	1	0	0	0	1	0	150
35	(United States) Je. Sneva	(United States) AMI Racing (United States) O'Hanlon Racing	7	0	0	0	1	0	149
36	(United States) Halsmer	(United States) Wysard Racing	2	0	0	0	1	0	128
37	(United States) Vukovich	(United States) Leader Card Racing	7	0	0	0	0	0	96
38	(Canada) Hucul	(United States) O'Hanlon Racing	1	0	0	0	1	0	90
39	(United States) Caliva	(United States) Alsup Racing	5	0	0	0	0	0	70
40	(United States) Ja. Sneva	(United States) BFM Enterprises (United States) Walmotor	1	0	0	0	1	0	60
41	(United States) Martin	(United States) JJ Enterprises	5	0	0	0	0	0	56
41	(United States) Mosley	(United States) All American Racers (United States) Mach I Racing	5	0	0	0	0	0	56
43	(United States) Saldana	(United States) Hoffman Racing	5	0	0	0	0	0	50
44	(United States) Foyt	(United States) Gilmore Racing	3	0	0	0	0	0	45
45	(United States) Shuman	(United States) Stanton Racing	1	0	0	0	0	0	40
46	(United States) Parsons	(United States) Lindsey Hopkins Racing	4	0	0	0	0	0	36
47	(United States) Mahler	(United States) Intercomp	5	0	0	0	0	0	35
48	(United States) D. Whittington	(United States) Whittington Bros. Racing	1	0	0	0	0	0	25
48	(United States) Wood	(United States) Mergard Racing	2	0	0	0	0	0	25
48	(United States) Chandler	(United States) Hodgdon Racing	1	0	0	0	0	0	25
48	(United States) Snider	(United States) Gilmore Racing	1	0	0	0	0	0	25
52	(United States) Haywood	(United States) Linsey Hopkins Racing	1	0	0	0	0	0	20
53	(United States) Threshie	(United States) Machinists Union Racing	2	0	0	0	0	0	15
54	(United States) Dickson	(United States) Machinists Union	2	0	0	0	0	0	10
55	(Mexico) Muñiz	(Mexico) Pronosticos Deportivos	1	0	0	0	0	0	8
55	(United States) Miller	(United States) Agajanian-Grant King Racers	1	0	0	0	0	0	8
57	(United States) Harvey	(United States) Agajanian-Grant King Racers	1	0	0	0	0	0	6
57	(United States) Frey	(United States) Hoffman Racing	1	0	0	0	0	0	6
57	(Mexico) Bolaños	(Mexico) Ovaciones	1	0	0	0	0	0	6
57	(Mexico) Jourdain Sr.	(Mexico) Shade Tree Racing	1	0	0	0	0	0	6
57	(United States) Davis	(United States) Davis Racing	1	0	0	0	0	0	6
57	(United States) Walther	(United States) Walmotor	1	0	0	0	0	0	6
63	(United States) Loquasto	(United States) Pacific Coast Racing	1	0	0	0	0	0	5
63	(United States) B. Whittington	(United States) Whittington Bros. Racing	1	0	0	0	0	0	5
63	(United States) Mead	(United States) Intercomp	1	0	0	0	0	0	5
63	(United States) T. Bettenhausen Jr.	(United States) Bettenhausen Racing	1	0	0	0	0	0	5
63	(United States) Heywood	(United States) Pacific Coast Racing	1	0	0	0	0	0	5

== See also ==
- 1980 Indianapolis 500
- 1980 USAC Championship Car season
