= 1980 California 500 =

American auto race

(United States) 1980 California 500
Race details
- Race 9 of 12 in the 1980 CART PPG Indy Car World Series season
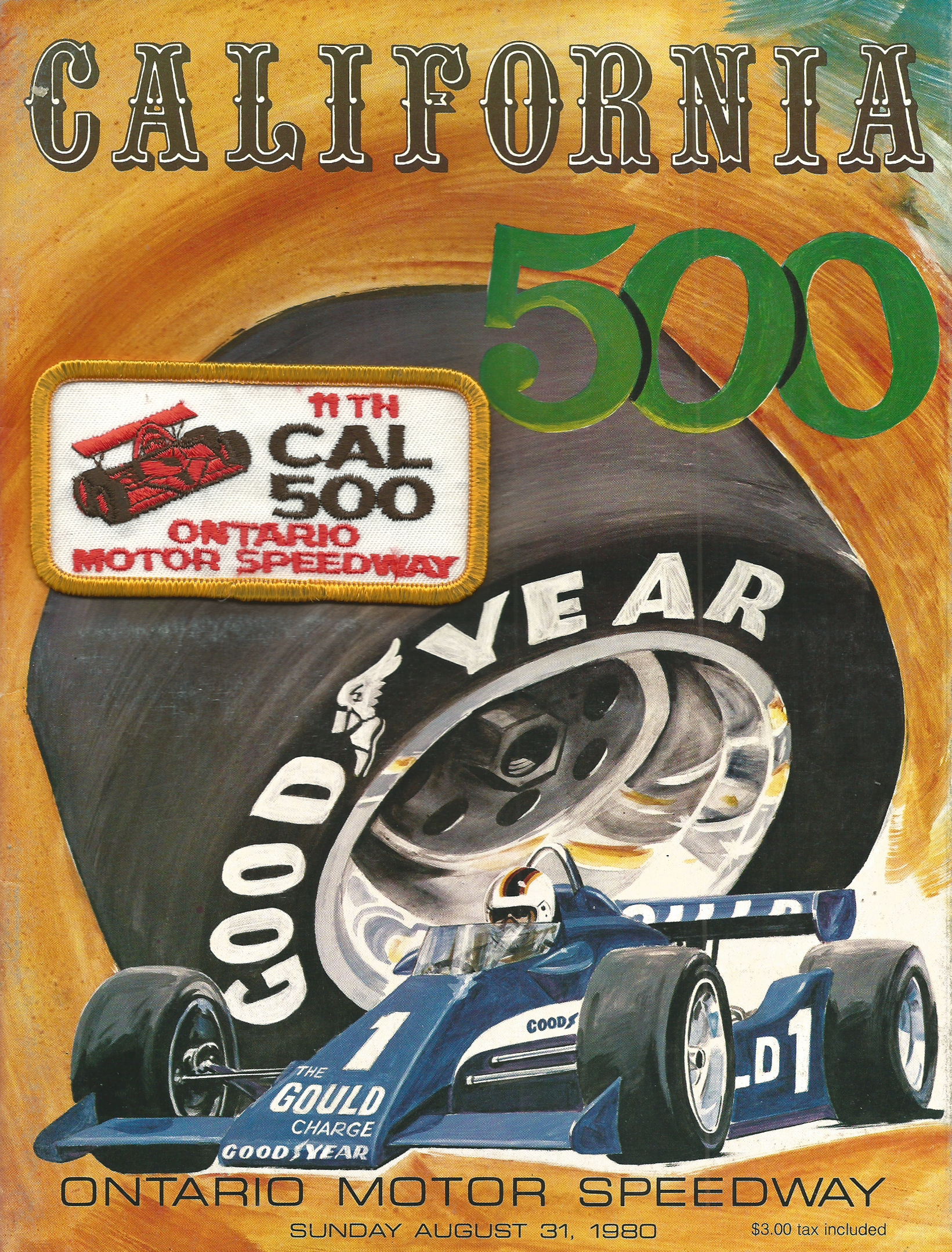
- Date: August 31, 1980
- Official name: 1980 California 500
- Location: Ontario Motor Speedway, Ontario, California, United States
- Course: Permanent racing facility 2.500 mi / 4.023 km
- Distance: 200 laps 500.000 mi / 804.672 km

Pole position
- Driver: (United States) Bobby Unser (Team Penske)
- Time: 195.200 mph (314.144 km/h)

Podium
- First: (United States) Bobby Unser (Team Penske)
- Second: (United States) Johnny Rutherford (Jim Hall/Chaparral)
- Third: (United States) Rick Mears (Team Penske)

The 1980 California 500, the eleventh running of the event, was held at the Ontario Motor Speedway in Ontario, California, on Sunday, August 31, 1980. The event was race number 9 of 12 in the 1980 CART PPG Indy Car World Series. The race was won by Bobby Unser, his fourth California 500 victory. The race was the final California 500 before Ontario Motor Speedway closed at the end of the year.

== Background ==
Two months after the 1979 California 500, Ontario Motor Speedway, it was reported the track went into foreclosure. It was clarified that a notice of default was filed by Bank of America, the first step towards selling the track on behalf of the bond-holders that owned the track. Ontario had made no interest payments on the bonds since February 1974, raising the accrued interest to $9.4 million.

By the summer of 1980, a new optimism appeared for the future of Ontario. On August 7, it was reported that the track would be sold to the Ontario Foothills Development Co, headed by Ted Dutton, for $42.15 million. It would recoup all the costs for the bondholders while also maintaining the track as a racing facility. The group planned to expand the facility as an entertainment facility with roller coasters and concerts while developing the surrounding area. "We want to quash the rumors that racing will not continue at Ontario," Dutton said. "We have no intention of closing the race track."

Ontario Motor Speedway General Manager Ray Smartis spoke highly of how the track had turned around since he took over in 1975. "When we started, Ontario Motor Speedway couldn't have brought $3 million on any market and now we're looking at $42 million." The sale was expected to be completed on September 8.

Johnny Rutherford won the 1980 Indianapolis 500 in May. In June, Bobby Unser won the Pocono 500. Rutherford entered the California 500 needing to finish fifth or better to clinch the 1980 IndyCar Championship.

== Practice and Time Trials ==
Practice began on Wednesday August 27. Defending California 500 champion, Bobby Unser was fastest at 194.363 mph. Johnny Rutherford was second fastest at 190.811 mph. Rick Mears was third fastest at 190.480 mph. John Mahler spun but avoided damage.

=== Pole Day - Thursday August 28 ===
Unlike in 1979 when time trials were Formula One-style group qualifying, the field was set by a single car, two-lap average speed. Bobby Unser continued his fast pace by winning the pole with an average speed of 195.200 mph. Rick Mears was second fastest at 191.396 mph. Completing the front row was Johnny Rutherford at 189.685 mph. Pancho Carter spun in oil and hit the wall in morning practice and did not set a qualifying speed.

=== Time Trials Day 2 - Friday August 29 ===
Pancho Carter was the fastest of second day qualifiers with a speed of 184.290 mph. His crew repaired his primary car that was wrecked on Thursday. 32 cars posted times over the two days. To fill the final position, CART officials added Roger Rager to the field, highest in points among cars not qualified. Track officials exercised their "promoter's option" and added Dick Ferguson, John Mahler, Jeff Heywood, and Chip Mead to the field to make a 37 car starting grid.

Howdy Holmes suffered a violent crash in morning practice when his car veered into the turn three wall. The car flipped wildly into the air and skidded upside down into the grass. Holmes suffered a few cracked ribs and a headache but returned to the track later that afternoon after being treated at a local hospital.

== Race ==
Estimates of the crowd ranged from 37,000 to 75,000.

At the start, Johnny Rutherford took the lead from Bobby Unser and led the first 12 laps. Unser took the lead for the first time on lap 13. On lap 24, John Mahler impacted the wall with the left side of his car in turn one.

Early in the race, Rick Mears took over the second position from Rutherford and was catching Unser until he cut a tire and made an unscheduled pit stop.

During the midpoint, Unser was forced to drive through the grass to avoid a stalled car. "I was coming up to lap some cars," Unser said, "and they were lapping some guys so it was four abreast and would have had no problem except for the fact there was a stalled car right in front of me. I didn't have time or space to move up so I had to drive off in the grass at 190 miles an hour. I stayed in the throttle, steered back on the track and went into the third turn just like normal for some reason. I'll tell you what, it surprised the hell out of me that I didn't buy the farm."

On lap 160, Bill Alsup spun in turn three to bring out a caution. Trying to avoid Alsup, Bill Tempero drove over Mike Mosley and got airborne. A restart on lap 167 allowed Rutherford to catch up to Unser. Unser maintained a lead a lead of 2 seconds until the final green flag pit stops with 15 laps to go. Coming in for fuel, Rutherford overshot the fuel hoses and took 21 seconds to refuel. Unser pitted a lap later and only took 12 seconds to refuel.

Bobby Unser beat Johnny Rutherford to win by 8.53 seconds. It was Unser's fourth win in the California 500. He led 182 of 200 laps.

Rutherford attributed Unser's victory to a new, larger turbocharger he was using. Regardless, Rutherford's second-place finish was enough to clinch the 1980 championship with three races remaining.

== Box score ==
Finish	Grid	No	Name	Entrant	Chassis	Engine	Laps	Time/Status	Led	Points
1	1	11	(United States) Bobby Unser	Penske Racing	Penske PC-9	Cosworth	200	3:11:51.000	182	1000
2	3	4	(United States) Johnny Rutherford	Chaparral Racing	Chaparral 2K	Cosworth	200	+8.53	13	800
3	2	1	(United States) Rick Mears	Penske Racing	Penske PC-9	Cosworth	199	+1 Lap	5	700
4	6	5	(United States) Al Unser	Longhorn Racing	Longhorn LR01	Cosworth	193	+7 Laps	0	600
5	24	61	(United States) Tom Gloy	Penske Racing	Penske PC-7	Cosworth	190	+10 Laps	0	500
6	23	18	(Australia) Dennis Firestone	Scientific Drilling Controls Racing	Penske PC-6	Cosworth	190	+10 Laps	0	400
7	22	10	(United States) Pancho Carter	Alex Morales Motorsports	Penske PC-7	Cosworth	189	+11 Laps	0	300
8	17	82	(United States) Rick Muther	Pacific Coast Racing	Penske PC-7	Cosworth	188	+12 Laps	0	250
9	34	81	(United States) Dick Ferguson	O'Hanlon Racing Team	McLaren M24	Cosworth	187	+13 Laps	0	200
10	25	34	(Australia) Vern Schuppan	Wysard Motor Co.	McLaren M24	Cosworth	185	+15 Laps	0	150
11	33	66	(United States) Roger Rager	Roger Rager	Wildcat Mk3	Chevrolet	180	+20 Laps	0	100
12	26	24	(United States) Sheldon Kinser	Leader Card Racers	Watson	Cosworth	178	+22 Laps	0	50
13	27	28	(United States) Herm Johnson	Cliff-Menard Racing	Lightning	Offenhauser	174	+26 Laps	0	25
14	13	72	(United States) Mike Chandler	National Engineering	McLaren M24	Cosworth	167	Engine	0	25
15	16	40	(United States) Tom Bagley	Patrick Racing	Wildcat Mk4	Cosworth	159	Wheel bearing	0	25
16	7	41	(United States) Bill Alsup	Alsup Racing	Penske PC-7	Cosworth	154	Crash	0	25
17	5	21	(United States) Mike Mosley	All American Racers	Eagle 80	Chevrolet	149	Crash	0	20
18	19	65	(United States) Bill Tempero	Bill Tempero	Eagle	Chevrolet	143	Crash	0	20
19	10	25	(United States) Danny Ongais	Interscope Racing	Parnelli VPJ6B	Cosworth	125	Fuel pump	0	20
20	18	44	(United States) Greg Leffler	Armstrong Mould Racing Team	Lola T500	Cosworth	118	Ignition	0	20
21	29	47	(Italy) Phil Caliva	Alsup Racing	McLaren M16C	Offenhauser	117	Lost power	0	15
22	11	15	(United States) Johnny Parsons	Lindsey Hopkins Racing	Lightning	Cosworth	116	Wheel bearing	0	15
23	14	20	(United States) Gordon Johncock	Patrick Racing	Phoenix 80	Cosworth	95	Engine	0	15
24	31	95	(United States) Larry Cannon	Kraco Racing	Wildcat Mk1	DGS	93	Engine	0	15
25	15	37	(United States) John Martin	J&J Enterprises	Wildcat Mk1	DGS	83	Oil leak	0	10
26	8	9	(United States) Tom Sneva	Jerry O'Connell Racing	McLaren M24	Cosworth	76	Engine	0	10
27	9	38	(United States) Jerry Karl	William Compton	McLaren M16E	Chevrolet	71	Engine	0	10
28	20	29	(United States) Billy Engelhart	Beaudoin Racing	McLaren M24	Cosworth	50	Clutch	0	10
29	37	91	(United States) Chip Mead	Intercomp Racing	Eagle	Offenhauser	26	Fuel	0	5
30	35	92	(United States) John Mahler	Intercomp Racing	Penske PC-6	Offenhauser	24	Crash	0	5
31	21	46	(United States) Gary Bettenhausen	Armstrong Mould Racing Team	Wildcat Mk2	Offenhauser	15	Transmission	0	5
32	36	86	(United States) Jeff Heywood	Pacific Coast Racing	Lightning	Offenhauser	14	Oil leak	0	5
33	4	35	(United States) Spike Gehlhausen	Fletcher Racing Team	Penske PC-7	Cosworth	12	Fuel pump	0	5
34	12	2	(United States) Bill Vukovich II	Leader Card Racers	Watson	Offenhauser	11	Turbocharger	0	5
35	32	30	(United States) Larry Dickson	Machinists Union Racing	IAM 001	Chevrolet	10	Oil pressure	0	5
36	30	43	(United States) Jerry Sneva	Armstrong Mould Racing Team	Orbiter Mk1	Cosworth	3	Overheating	0	5
37	28	8	(United States) Dick Simon	Vollstedt Enterprises	Vollstedt	Offenhauser	0	Oil pressure	0	5

=== Race Statistics ===
- Average Speed: 156.372 mph (251.656 km/h)
- Lead changes: 8 among 3 drivers

Lap Leaders
From Lap	To Lap	Total Laps	Leader
1	12	12	Johnny Rutherford
13	31	19	Bobby Unser
32	35	4	Rick Mears
36	46	11	Bobby Unser
47	47	1	Johnny Rutherford
48	66	19	Bobby Unser
67	67	1	Rick Mears
68	200	133	Bobby Unser

== Standings after the race ==
Drivers' Championship standings

Pos	Driver	Points
1	(United States) Johnny Rutherford	4490
2	(United States) Bobby Unser	3234
3	(United States) Tom Sneva	2330
4	(United States) Rick Mears	2266
5	(United States) Pancho Carter	1754

== Aftermath ==
In mid-August, it was reported that a deal had been reached to sell the track for $42.15 million and keep the track open, with the deal expected to be completed on September 8. When the time came to close the deal, the potential sale fell through. The intended buyers, the Ontario Foothill Development Corp., brought in the Chevron Land and Development Company, a subsidiary of Standard Oil.

When the 1981 CART schedule was released, the California 500 was scheduled for September 6, 1981.

The last on-track activity at OMS was private tests for Indycar teams. In early December 1980, Al Unser tested his 1981 Indycar, the Longhorn LR-01. On Tuesday, December 16, 1980, Gordon Johncock tested his 1981 chassis at Ontario. He ultimately was the last person to drive a race car at the track. That same day, it was announced that Chevron had reached a deal to purchase the track for $35 million and the track would be demolished shortly thereafter.

The late-summer CART date in Southern California was transferred to Riverside International Raceway. To replace the lost 500-mile event, the CART race at Michigan was extended to 500 miles.
