= 1981 Pocono 500 =

(United States) 1981 Pocono 500
Race details
- 2nd round of the 1981 USAC Championship Car season
- Date: June 21, 1981
- Official name: 1981 Van Scoy Diamond Mine 500
- Location: Long Pond, Pennsylvania
- Course: Permanent racing facility 2.5 mi / 4.023 km
- Distance: 122 laps 305 mi / 490.849 km
- Weather: Temperatures up to 78 °F (26 °C); wind speeds up to 18 miles per hour (29 km/h)

Pole position
- Driver: (United States) A. J. Foyt (A. J. Foyt Racing)
- Time: Drew for Position

Podium
- First: (United States) A. J. Foyt (A. J. Foyt Racing)
- Second: (Australia) Geoff Brabham (Josele Garza)
- Third: (United States) Tom Bigelow (Richard Hammond)

The 1981 Pocono 500, the 11th running of the event, was held at the Pocono Raceway in Long Pond, Pennsylvania, on Sunday, June 21, 1981. Branded as the 1981 Van Scoy Diamond Mine 500 for sponsorship reasons, the race was part of the 1981–82 USAC Gold Crown Championship season. The event is notable as it was the 67th and final Indy car race victory for A. J. Foyt. The race was ended after 122 laps (305 miles) due to rain.

The race is particularly noteworthy for its role in the confrontation ("Split") between Indy car sanctioning bodies, USAC and CART. Most teams from the CART series boycotted the event, and the field was filled mostly by USAC series regulars. Several of the entries were older chassis, but this still resulted in a smaller than normal field. In order to fill the grid with more cars, converted dirt cars from the USAC Silver Crown Series were invited to participate. The race essentially ran as a two-class race, with the front-engine Silver Crown cars running about 30-40 mph slower than the Indy cars.

== Background ==
Pocono Raceway was in financial trouble following CART's boycott of the 1979 Pocono 500. In August of that year, Pocono filed a $6.3 million lawsuit against CART seeking damages.

To help pay creditors, Pocono was leased to the Indianapolis Motor Speedway for the entire 1980 season and all of the races were promoted by Indianapolis. In late 1980, Pocono owner Joseph Mattioli advertised the track for sale in The Wall Street Journal and received three offers, one of which involved closing the track.

Shortly after the 1980 Pocono 500, the USAC and CART compromise sanctioning body, the Championship Racing League was dissolved. The Indianapolis Motor Speedway announced that they would not allow USAC to sanction the 1981 Indianapolis 500 as part of the CRL, and USAC withdrew their support.

Beginning in November 1980, Pocono began negotiating with CART officials to run the Pocono 500 under CART sanctioning on June 28, 1981. A proposed deal would have CART, Roger Penske, and Pat Patrick lease the track (including for operations of the NASCAR events) for a minimum of three years with an option for an additional two. The deal would have also seen Pocono drop their lawsuit against CART. However, in late February, the deal was denied by the First Pennsylvania Bank, a major creditor of the race track, claiming any deal over one year could harm any potential sale.

"We desperately wanted to run at Pocono," CART CEO John Frasco said. "We wanted to run a major race in the east and we felt Pocono was critical. It just came as a shock to everybody involved that the bank was so inflexible."

In response, CART scheduled an event at Atlanta for the Pocono weekend of June 28. In early March, Pocono announced the Pocono 500 would be held on June 21 with USAC sanctioning as part of the 1981–82 USAC season. The race was moved up a week to attract participation from CART teams.

== CART Boycott ==
Before the CART race at the Milwaukee Mile on June 7, 1981, CART's board of directors voted to forbid its members from competing in the Pocono 500. Their reasoning was that by competing at Pocono on June 21, it would not give teams enough time to prepare for the CART race one week later at Atlanta Motor Speedway. CART would impose a 60-day suspension on any driver that competed at Pocono. CART's director of communications, Michael Knight said "The board's decision was not anti-Pocono, but rather pro-CART. With a CART race coming up the following week at Atlanta, the feeling was the races were too close together, and competing in both would have an adverse effect on the quality of the show at Atlanta."

Critics pointed out that CART had races scheduled on consecutive weeks at Milwaukee and Michigan in July.

On June 9, USAC President Dick King sent a letter to CART President John Frasco saying that CART was "constituting a clear and blatant group boycott (violation) of anti-trust laws."

In response to the CART boycott, the Dan Gurney-owned team driven by Mike Mosley and Indianapolis 500 rookie of the year, Josele Garza withdrew their entries from the Pocono 500. Garza's team instead entered Geoff Brabham at Pocono, who planned to skip the Atlanta race regardless.

A handful of CART drivers entered the Pocono 500 despite the boycott. Tom Sneva, Dick Simon, Roger Rager, Jim McElreath, Tom Bigelow, and Geoff Brabham held CART licenses. Sneva, the 1977 Pocono 500 champion, thought CART's boycott was hurting Indy car racing as a whole and Pocono should be supported for its survival. "We feel it's important to support races in the East. We don't want to see the same thing happen to this track that happened to Ontario. We feel CART might win the battle and lose the war."

Pocono track owner, Joseph Mattioli, told Newsday he thought the boycott was CART's attempt to put Pocono out of business and gain leverage over Indianapolis. "That's the first stage, they put me out of business. The second phase would be to use me as a pawn to get Indianapolis. If they get me, Indianapolis is next. And I think they'll use me as a hostage next year for Indianapolis, and they'll want a four or five million dollar purse at Indianapolis. That's the botton line for all of this. You can see what they're doing to us here. They've hurt us for three years now. This year we'll lose half a million dollars. We had 38 entries in, but when CART threatened that 60 day suspension, 12 of them dropped out."

On June 15, it was announced that several owners of dirt cars were invited by the track to fill the field. The front-engined dirt cars had eight-cylinder Chevrolet engines and 74 gallon fuel tanks as opposed to the 40 gallon in Indy cars. The dirt cars were assured a minimum of $5,000 each. The entries included Jack Hewitt, Larry Rice, and Smokey Snellbaker.

== Practice and Starting Grid Draw ==
A shortened, three-day race weekend began on Friday, June 19 with practice. Tom Sneva was fastest with a speed of 186.49 mph. A. J. Foyt was second fastest at 183.86 mph.

Rain washed out all track activity on Saturday, including qualifying. The starting lineup was set by random draw, with starting spots in the top-six reserved for former champions, drivers who finished top-10 in USAC points in 1979 or 1980, and former 500-mile race winners. A.J. Foyt drew the pole. Jim McElreath (who at 53 years-old became the oldest man to start a 500-mile race) drew second. Tom Sneva picked the third position. Vern Schuppan arrived late and drew the fifth starting spot despite making no practice laps. Gary Bettenhausen drew the sixth starting position despite only reaching a top speed of 97 mph in Friday's practice. Positions 7–16 were for cars entered before the May 24 entry deadline. Positions 17–21 were rear-engined cars entered after May 24. Positions 22–29 were the dirt cars.

== Race ==
From the third starting position, Tom Sneva took the lead when the green flag was thrown. The first caution of the race came out on lap five when Jan Sneva blew an engine and stopped on track.

Shortly after the restart, Foyt took the lead on lap 14 and held it for two laps. Sneva retook the lead and held it until lap 25 when he pitted under caution.

Tom Sneva and A.J. Foyt swapped the lead repeatedly over the first 200 miles. Sneva led 56 laps, but fell out of the race on lap 80 with gearbox failure.

Geoff Brabham and Tom Bigelow joined Foyt in swapping the lead as they reached the midway point of the race. Brabham took the lead from Foyt on lap 112.

Roger Rager spun and brushed the wall in turn two on lap 115 to bring out the caution. As the field approached the restart, Brabham led the field back to the green flag. Foyt anticipated the restart and quickly passed Brabham on the frontstretch. Two laps later, rain began to fall and the caution flag came back out.

The race was called due to rain after 305 miles, 122 laps, and A.J. Foyt won his fourth Pocono 500. It was Foyt's 67th win in Indy car competition, and as it turned out, the final win of his Indy car career.

The highest finishing dirt car was Mark Alderson who finished 11th, 18 laps behind Foyt. As of 2023, it was the final time a front-engined car competed in an Indy car event.

The crowd was estimated at 25,000, down from a peak of 110,000 in three years earlier in 1978.

== Box score ==
FP	SP	Driver	Entrant	Chassis	Engine	Laps	Status	Led
1	1	A.J. Foyt	Gilmore-Foyt Racing	March 81C	Cosworth DFX	122	137.196 mph	35
2	4	Geoff Brabham	Psachie-Garza Racing	Penske PC-9	Cosworth DFX	122	Running	15
3	14	Tom Bigelow	Gohr Racing	Penske PC-7	Chevrolet	122	Running	15
4	9	George Snider	Gilmore-Foyt Racing	Coyote	Cosworth DFX	121	Running	0
5	12	Harry MacDonald	Sherman Armstrong	Lola T500	Cosworth DFX	120	Running	0
6	7	Billy Vukovich II	Harry Schwartz	Watson	Offenhauser	119	Running	0
7	2	Jim McElreath	Jim McElreath	Penske PC-6	Cosworth DFX	118	Running	0
8	15	Roger Rager	Louis Seymour	Wildcat	Chevrolet	113	Wing	0
9	13	Chip Mead	Frank Carlone	Eagle	Cosworth DFX	106	Suspension	0
10	21	Bill Henderson	Tom Frantz	Eagle	Offenhauser	105	Running	0
11	26	Mark Alderson	Steve Enslow	Silver Crown car	Chevrolet	104	Running	0
12	24	Jack Hewitt	Radio Hospital	Silver Crown car	Chevrolet	97	Running	0
13	22	Smokey Snellbaker	Charles Lloyd	Silver Crown car	Chevrolet	94	Running	0
14	19	Steve Ball	Robert Gaby	Coyote	Chevrolet	94	Running	0
15	28	Bill Tyler	Lyle Roberts	Silver Crown car	Chevrolet	88	Running	0
16	3	Tom Sneva	Bignotti-Cotter	March 81C	Cosworth DFX	79	Gearbox	56
17	5	Vern Schuppan	Theodore Racing	McLaren	Cosworth DFX	76	Oil pressure	1
18	18	Richard Hubbard	Shirley McElreath	Eagle	Offenhauser	75	Cylinder head	0
19	23	Jeff Bloom	Cecilia Smith	Silver Crown car	Chevrolet	73	Cylinder head	0
20	16	Dick Simon	Ralph Wilke	Watson	Offenhauser	66	Running	0
21	29	Larry Rice	Lloyd Weaver	Silver Crown car	Chevrolet	66	Running	0
22	17	Dean Vetrock	Dean Vetrock	Eagle	Chevrolet	57	Fuel pickup	0
23	11	Johnny Parsons	Sherman Armstrong	SEA	Cosworth DFX	37	Radiator	0
24	27	Paul Pitzer	GCQ Racing	Silver Crown car	Chevrolet	27	Shock absorber	0
25	10	Jerry Sneva	Rolla Vollstedt	Vollstedt	Offenhauser	24	Fuel leak	0
26	20	Salt Walther	Dan Cotter	March 81C	Cosworth DFX	21	Magneto	0
27	6	Gary Bettenhausen	Rolla Vollstedt	Vollstedt	Offenhauser	16	Oil pressure	0
28	25	Duke Cook	Michael Aberle	Silver Crown car	Chevrolet	6	Engine	0
29	8	Jan Sneva	Agajanian-King	King	Chevrolet	4	Engine	0
—	—	Lennie Waldo	Unknown	Silver Crown car	Chevrolet	DNS	Did not start	

=== Race Statistics ===
- Time of race: 2:13:23
- Cautions: 7 for 28 laps
- Lead Changes 30 among 5 drivers
- Reference

== Aftermath ==
Tom Sneva, Dick Simon, Roger Rager, Jim McElreath, Tom Bigelow, Geoff Brabham, and Dean Vetrock filed a lawsuit against CART seeking their 60-day suspension to be overturned and to be allowed to compete at the CART race at Atlanta the following week. The case was heard in United States District Court for the Northern District of Georgia by Judge Charles A. Moye.

Moye sided with the drivers and granted an injunction that began one day after the race at Atlanta. In his written order, Moye disagreed with CART's reasoning that the ban was because teams would not have time to safely prepare cars for races on consecutive weeks.

"The safety justification appears on the basis of the present record to be a late-concern justification for an action – the primary motivation for which appears to have been the affecting of competition. The alleged safety justification is belied by the facts that the suspensions last for more than one week, by CART's scheduling of its own races on successive weekends in August, by the shortening of Pocono to 305 miles and especially by the suspensions of drivers who did not intend to race in Atlanta."

"Finally, if safety were really the issue here, CART would have considered canceling the race. It appears to the court that a number of drivers wanted to run in the established, prestigious Pocono 500 and were not eager to race in Atlanta and that the action by CART was designed to cause drivers to opt for Atlanta over Pocono."

Pocono had an ongoing lawsuit against CART seeking $6 million in damages over a boycott of the 1979 race. After the 1981 race boycott, Pocono increased their lawsuit on July 9, to $9 million in damages, alleging that CART was guilty of "conspiracy to monopolize" Indy car racing. In addition to their loss of $2 million in 1979, the track lost $1,250,000 from the 1981 event. As is common in antitrust lawsuits, Pocono sought triple the damages. In addition to CART, defendants included Team Penske, Roger Penske, Patrick Racing Teams, Pat Patrick, and Gould Inc. They alleged that the defendants "knew about the financial difficulties suffered by the track and they hoped that they could acquire the property at a 'distress' price."

While the lawsuit was ongoing, Pocono added a second NASCAR Winston Cup race and dropped the Indy Car Pocono 500.

In early May 1982, Pocono received a confidential settlement from CART and was a late addition to the 1982 CART schedule. As part of the settlement, CART agreed to rent and promote the Pocono 500 themselves for a period of five years, through 1986.

== Broadcasting ==
A one-hour syndicated broadcast was aired on television networks on July 11.
