= List of non-qualifying Indianapolis 500 drivers =

Drivers that have entered and/or attempted to qualify for the Indianapolis 500, but have never qualified in their entire career, includes drivers that were either bumped, too slow, or incomplete qualifying attempt. Also includes drivers that participated in Rookie Orientation only, as well as drivers that withdrew during practice, or participated in practice, but did not make a qualifying attempt.

- Tony Adamowicz
- Jim Adams
- Chris Amon
- Didier André
- Zora Arkus-Duntov
- Scott Atchison
- Dick Atkins
- Steve Barclay
- Stanton Barrett
- Kevin Bartlett
- Joe Barzda
- Rollie Beale
- Justin Bell
- Ross Bentley
- Merle Bettenhausen
- Lucien Bianchi
- Bob Bondurant
- Neil Bonnett
- Mike Borkowski
- Lindley Bothwell
- Lee Brayton
- Steve Bren
- Bert Brooks
- Jim Buick
- Marvin Burke
- Steve Butler
- Red Byron
- Phil Caliva
- Earle Canavan
- John Cannon
- Rudolf Caracciola
- Ross Cheever
- Chuck Ciprich
- Franco Comotti
- Dale Coyne
- Ed Crombie
- Guido Daccò
- Chuck Daigh
- Paul Dana
- Jorge Daponte
- Luis Díaz
- Doug Didero
- Mario Domínguez
- René Dreyfus
- Dan Drinan
- George Eaton
- Fredrik Ekblom
- Jack Fairman
- Juan Manuel Fangio
- Giuseppe Farina
- Nick Firestone
- John Fitch
- Tom Frantz
- Franck Fréon
- Bob Frey
- Bruno Giacomelli
- Todd Gibson
- Memo Gidley
- Richie Ginther
- Charlie Glotzbach
- Andy Granatelli
- Michael Greenfield
- Perry Grimm
- Olivier Grouillard
- Johnny Hannon
- Johnny Herbert
- Doug Heveron
- Bruce Jacobi
- Ronnie Johncox
- Junior Johnson
- Rupert Keegan
- Ed Kostenuk
- David Kudrave
- Jan Lammers
- Anthony Lazzaro
- Ralph Liguori
- Harry MacDonald
- Jovy Marcelo
- Scott Mayer
- Joe Mazzucco
- Bruce McLaren
- Chip Mead
- Casey Mears
- George Metzler
- Rick Miaskiewicz
- Jerry Miller
- Kenji Momota
- Frank Mundy
- Mike Nish
- Tazio Nuvolari
- Danny Oakes
- Jim Packard
- Carlos Pairetti
- Teddy Pilette
- Pedro Rodríguez
- Michael Roe
- Franco Rol
- Steve Saleen
- Vinicio Salmi
- Harry Sauce
- Ken Schrader
- Ron Shuman
- Leon "Jigger" Sirios
- Al Smith
- Mark Smith
- Jan Sneva
- Joe Sostilio
- Scott Speed
- Mike Spence
- Dave Steele
- Harry Stockman
- Sammy Swindell
- Bill Tempero
- Randy Tolsma
- Ho-Pin Tung
- Curtis Turner
- Achille Varzi
- Dean Vetrock
- John de Vries
- Leroy Warriner
- Frank Weiss
- Desiré Wilson
- Jeff Wood
- John Wood
