= 1975 12 Hours of Sebring =

Sports car endurance race

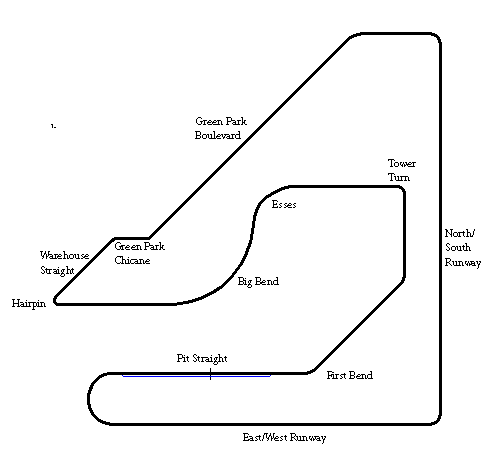
Sebring International Raceway in 1975

The Sebring '75 Twelve Hours of Endurance, was the second round of the 1975 IMSA GT Championship and was held at the Sebring International Raceway on March 21, 1975. Victory overall went to the No. 25 BMW Motorsport BMW 3.0 CSL driven by British driver Brian Redman, Canadian born Australian Allan Moffat, American Sam Posey, and West German Hans-Joachim Stuck.

== Race results ==
Class winners in bold.

Pos	Class	No	Team	Drivers	Car	Laps
1	**GTO**	**25**	**(Germany) BMW Motorsport**	**(United Kingdom) Brian Redman (Australia) Allan Moffat (United States) Sam Posey (Germany) Hans-Joachim Stuck**	**BMW 3.0 CSL**	**238**
2	GTO	30	(United States) George Dyer	(United States) George Dyer (Canada) Jacques Bienvenue	Porsche 911 Carrera RSR	235
3	GTO	43	(United States) Ecurie Escargot	(United States) John Graves (United States) John O'Steen (United States) Dave Helmick	Porsche 911 Carrera RSR	231
4	GTO	91	(Mexico) Bolanos Racing	(Mexico) Juan Carlos Bolaños (Mexico) Michel Jourdain Sr. (Mexico) Gustavo Bolaños	Porsche 911 Carrera RSR	230
5	GTO	4	(United States) George Dickinson	(United States) George Dickinson (United States) Bill Webbe (United States) Harry Theodoracopulos	Porsche 911 Carrera RSR	221
6	GTO	111	(United States) North American Racing Team	(United States) Milt Minter (Canada) Eppie Wietzes	Ferrari 365 GT4 BB	215
7	GTO	5	(United States) Bob Harmon	(United States) Bob Harmon (United States) Jon Woodner	Porsche 911 Carrera RSR	213
8	GTO	68	(Puerto Rico) Diego Febles Racing	(Puerto Rico) Diego Febles (United States) Hiram Cruz	Porsche 911 Carrera RSR	211
9	GTO	87	(United States) Jones Motorsports	(United States) Harry Jones (France) Marcel Mignot	Ferrari 365 GTB/4	209
10	**GTU**	**44**	**(United States) Montura Ranch Estates**	**(United States) Tony Garcia (United States) Albert Naon (United States) John Freyre**	**Porsche 911S**	**209**
11	GTU	34	(United States) George Drolsom	(United States) George Drolsom (United States) Bob Nagel	Porsche 911S	207
12	GTO	14	(United States) Holbert's Porsche-Audi	(United States) Al Holbert (United States) Elliot Forbes-Robinson	Porsche 911 Carrera RSR	204
13 DNF	GTO	1	(United States) Toad Hall Racing	(United States) Michael Keyser (Mexico) Billy Sprowls (Mexico) Andres Contreras	Porsche 911 Carrera RSR	200
14	GTO	79	(United States) Michael Callas	(United States) Michael Callas (United States) Jim Cook (United States) Adrian Gang	Porsche 911 Carrera RSR	200
15	GTU	60	(United States) Rusty Bond	(United States) Rusty Bond (United States) George Rollin (United States) John Belperche	Porsche 911S	200
16 DNF	GTO	92	(United States) Oest-Tillson Racing	(United States) Mike Tillson (United States) Dieter Oest	Porsche 911 Carrera RSR	198
17	GTU	67	(United States) David McClain	(United States) David McClain (United States) Dave White	Porsche 911 Carrera S	198
18	GTU	84	(United States) Bob Speakman	(United States) Bob Speakman (United States) John Maffucci	Datsun 240Z	197
19	GTU	90	(United States) Ray Walle Mazda	(United States) Ray Walle (United States) Tom Reddy	Mazda RX-3	195
20	GTO	72	(United States) Bill Arnold	(United States) Bill Arnold (United States) Wiley Doran	Chevrolet Corvette	183
21	GTU	29	(United States) Bruce Mabrito	(United States) Bruce Mabrito (United States) Jack Steel	Datsun 240Z	180
22	GTO	82	(United States) Bill Scott Racing	(United States) Bll Scott (United States) Harry MacDonald (United States) Bill Neuhoff	AMC Gremlin	180
23	GTO	86	(United States) Dennis Stefl	(United States) Dennis Stefl (United States) Robert Fordyce	Chevrolet Corvette	176
24 DNF	GTO	17	(United States) Vince Gimondo	(United States) Vince Gimondo (United States) John Tremblay	Chevrolet Camaro	171
25 DNF	GTO	23	(United States) Armorall Racing Team	(United States) Charlie Kemp (United States) Carson Baird	Porsche 911 Carrera RSR	167
26 DNF	GTO	73	(United States) Robert Christiansen	(United States) Bob Christiansen (United States) Gary Myers	Chevrolet Camaro	165
27	GTO	32	(United States) E. F. Miller & Co.	(United States) John Orr (United States) Bill Jobe	Chevrolet Corvette	163
28 DNF	GTU	45	(United States) Delta Racing	(United States) Armando Ramirez (Colombia) Camilo Mutiz (Colombia) Mauricio de Narváez	Porsche 911S	152
29	GTU	914	(United States) Holbert's Porsche-Audi	(United States) Bill Schmid (United States) Doc Bundy	Porsche 914	151
30	GTU	31	(Dominican Republic) Luiz Garcia Jr.	(Dominican Republic) Luiz Garcia Jr. (Dominican Republic) Jose Arzeno (Puerto Rico) Mandy Gonzalez	BMW 2002	151
31 DNF	GTU	46	(United States) Buzbee Tropical Fish	(United States) Spencer Buzbee (United States) Craig Ross (United States) William Frates	Datsun 240Z	143
32 DNF	GTO	8	(United States) Bob Beasley	(United States) Bob Beasley (United States) Bruce Jennings	Porsche 911 Carrera RSR	132
33	GTO	48	(United States) John Carusso	(United States) John Carusso (United States) Dick Vreeland (United States) Luis Sereix	Chevrolet Corvette	132
34	GTO	27	(United States) Robert E. Davis	(United States) Robert E. Davis (United States) Tico Almeida (United States) Joseph DeGirolamo	Chevrolet Corvette	132
35 DNF	GTO	38	(United States) Roberto Boza	(United States) Roberto Boza (United States) Diosdado Diaz (United States) Eduardo Garrido	Chevrolet Camaro	128
36 DNF	GTO	18	(United States) Terry Wolters	(United States) Terry Wolters (United States) Jack Swanson	Chevrolet Camaro	126
37	GTU	47	(United States) Jacques Groleau	(United States) Jacques Groleau (United States) A. J. Brent (United States) John Sweeney	Datsun 240Z	124
38	GTU	61	(United States) Larry Parker	(United States) Larry Parker (United States) Robert LaMay (United States) Paul Morgan	Ford Pinto	114
39 DNF	GTO	24	(Germany) BMW Motorsport	(Germany) Hans-Joachim Stuck (United States) Sam Posey	BMW 3.0 CSL	102
40 DNF	GTO	12	(United States) Ford Smith	(United States) Ford Smith (United States) Clay Young (United States) Bennett Aiken	Chevrolet Corvette	102
41 DNF	GTO	54	(United States) Southpoint Porsche	(United States) John Tunstall (United States) Joe Jenkins	Porsche 911 Carrera RSR	97
42	GTU	58	(United States) Professional Paint & Body	(United States) Ron Oyler (United States) Guy Church	Renault 12	95
43 DNF	GTO	58	(Canada) Maurice Carter	(Canada) Maurice Carter (United States) Tony DeLorenzo	Chevrolet Camaro	93
44 DNF	GTO	66	(United States) Miller & Norburn	(United States) Nick Craw (United States) Russ Norburn	BMW 2002 TI	82
45 DNF	GTO	76	(United States) Kidd-America Racing	(United States) Burt Greenwood (United States) Scott Voeltz (United States) Dana English	Chevrolet Corvette	67
46 DNF	GTO	33	(Mexico) Roberto Quintanilla	(Mexico) Roberto Quintanilla (United States) David Loring	Porsche 911 Carrera RSR	65
47 DNF	GTU	28	(Puerto Rico) Bonky Fernandez	(Puerto Rico) Bonky Fernandez (Puerto Rico) Mandy Gonzalez (Puerto Rico) Gustavo Chevres	Lotus Elan	62
48 DNF	GTO	62	(United States) Scott Chapman	(United States) Scott Chapman (United States) Bill Hood (United States) Bobby Dumont	Chevrolet Corvette	57
49 DNF	GTO	49	(United States) Neil Potter	(United States) Neil Potter (United States) Bob Gray (United States) Terry Keller	Ford Mustang	54
50 DNF	GTU	63	(United States) Doell Enterprises	(United States) Bob Punch (United States) Tom Waugh (United States) Eliott Mendenhall	Porsche 911S	53
51 DNF	GTO	56	(United States) Charles Gano	(United States) Charles Gano (United States) Mike Williamson (United States) Jerry Parson	Chevrolet Camaro	52
52 DNF	GTU	51	(United States) Johnson-Bozzoni Porsche-Audi	(United States) John Hotchkis (United States) Robert Kirby (United States) Len Jones	Porsche 914-6 GT	51
53 DNF	GTO	59	(United States) Brumos Porsche-Audi	(United States) Peter Gregg (United States) Hurley Haywood	Porsche 911 Carrera RSR	50
54 DNF	GTU	85	(United States) John E. Hulen	(United States) John Hulen (United States) Ron Coupland (United States) Dave Causey	Porsche 914-6 GT	46
55 DNF	GTO	95	(Mexico) Sergio Tabe	(Mexico) Sergio Tabe (Mexico) Jose Marron (Mexico) Fidel Martinez	Porsche 914-6 GT	45
56 DNF	GTO	75	(United States) John Greenwood	(United States) John Greenwood (United States) Jerry Thompson	Chevrolet Corvette	42
57 DNF	GTU	10	(United States) Alf Gebhardt	(United States) Alf Gebhardt (Germany) Bruno Beilcke (United States) Sepp Grinbold	BMW 2002	38
58 DNF	GTO	40	(United States) John Hastings	(United States) John Hastings (United States) Glenn Bunch	Jaguar E-Type	34
59 DNF	GTO	26	(United States) Tim Chitwood	(United States) Tim Chitwood (United States) Joie Chitwood	Chevrolet Camaro	33
60 DNF	GTU	50	(United States) Pedro Vasquez Jr.	(United States) Pedro Vasquez Jr. (United States) Manuel Quintana (United States) Don Yenko	Porsche 911S	29
61 DNF	GTO	55	(United States) Henry Simon	(United States) Henry Simon (United States) J. Kirby Stumpff (United States) Augusto Molina	Ford Mustang	20
62 DNF	GTU	53	(United States) Arthur Mollin	(United States) Arthur Mollin (United States) Art Riley	Volvo 142S	19
63 DNF	GTO	77	(United States) Ralph Noseda	(United States) Ralph Noseda (United States) Ray Mummery (United States) Richard Small	Chevrolet Camaro	17
64 DNF	GTO	57	(United States) Marty Hinze	(United States) Marty Hinze (United States) Bob Grossman	De Tomaso Pantera	16
65 DNF	GTO	22	(United States) Dale Kreider	(United States) Dale Kreider (United States) Bob DeMarco	Chevrolet Corvette	16
66 DNF	GTO	9	(United States) Tony Ansley	(United States) Tony Ansley (United States) Ron Connelly (United States) Jim Woodall	Chevrolet Corvette	16
67 DNF	GTU	69	(Colombia) Juan Montalvo	(Colombia) Juan Montalvo (United States) Jim Grob	Ford Escort	8
68 DNF	GTO	74	(Canada) Ludwig Heimrath	(Canada) Norm Ridgely (Canada) Ludwig Heimrath	Porsche 911 Carrera RSR	5
69 DNF	GTO	2	(Mexico) Daniel Muñiz	(Mexico) Daniel Muñiz (United States) Johnny Gerber (Mexico) Miguel Muñiz	BMW 3.0 CSL	3
DNS	GTO	3	(United States) Ippocampos Racing	(United States) Harry Theodoracopulos (United States) Skip Barber	Ford Capri	0
DNS	GTO	71	(United States) Levi's Team Highball	(United States) Amos Johnson (United States) Dennis Shaw	AMC Gremlin	0
DNS	GTU	52	(United States) Charles Kleinschmidt	(United States) Charles Kleinschmidt (United States) Jack Andrus (United States) Lee Culpepper	MG MGB	0
DNS	GTO	41	(United States) Herb Jones Jr.	(United States) Herb Jones Jr. (United States) Phil Currin (United States) Steve Faul	Chevrolet Camaro	0
DNS	GTO	96	(United States) Bobby Diehl	(United States) Ted Kempgens	Chevrolet Corvette	0
DNQ	GTU	39	(United States) Dean Donley	(United States) Dean Donley (United States) Ben Scott (United States) Reggie Smith	MG MGB	
DNQ	GTU	37	(United States) Tom Fraser	(United States) Tom Fraser (United States) Tommy Archer	Datsun 510	
DNQ	GTO	78	(United States) Tom Ross	(United States) Tom Ross (United States) Louis Beres	Ford Mustang	
DNQ	GTU	81	(United States) Dean Craven	(United States) Dean Craven (United States) David Horniman	Ford Pinto	
DNQ	GTU	03	(United States) Ozone Industries	(United States) Philip Dann (United States) Stephen Bond	Opel GT	
DNQ	GTO	6	(United States) Byron Cook	(United States) Byron Cook (United States) George Bryan (United States) Bill McDill	Chevrolet Camaro	
DNQ	GTO	65	(United States) Ahmed Valhuerdi	(United States) Ahmed Valhuerdi (United States) Manuel Mendez (United States) Tony Garcia	Shelby GT350	
DNQ	GTU	70	(United States) Starbrite	(United States) Tom Kuenz (United States) Dale Elgie	Datsun 510	
DNQ	GTO	98	(United States) Cliff Gottlob	(United States) Cliff Gottlob (United States) Mike Yates	Chevrolet Corvette	

=== Class Winners ===
Class	Winners	
GTO	Redman / Moffat / Posey / Stuck	BMW 3.0 CSL
GTU	Garcia / Naon / Freyre	Porsche 911S
