= 1980 Pocono 500 =

IndyCar motor race, held in 1980

(United States) 1980 Pocono 500
Race details
- 4th round of the 1980 USAC Championship Car season
- Date: June 22, 1980
- Official name: 1980 True Value 500
- Location: Long Pond, Pennsylvania
- Course: Permanent racing facility 2.5 mi / 4.023 km
- Distance: 200 laps 500 mi / 804.672 km
- Weather: Temperatures up to 80 °F (27 °C); wind speeds up to 12 miles per hour (19 km/h)

Pole position
- Driver: (United States) A. J. Foyt (A. J. Foyt Racing)
- Time: 185.491 mph

Podium
- First: (United States) Bobby Unser (Team Penske)
- Second: (United States) Johnny Rutherford (Chaparral Cars)
- Third: (United States) Tom Sneva (Jerry O'Connell)

The 1980 Pocono 500 was an IndyCar Series motor race held at the Pocono Raceway in Long Pond, Pennsylvania, on Sunday June 22, 1980. Branded as the 1980 True Value 500 for sponsorship reasons, it was the tenth running of the event. The event was part of both the 1980 USAC Championship Car season and the 1980 CART PPG Indy Car World Series. Bobby Unser won the race driving for Team Penske. It was Unser's first Pocono 500 win and the third for Penske.

== Background ==
After the controversial battle in 1979 between USAC and CART the landscape of Indy car racing was starting to settle into a more civilized fashion. During the offseason, USAC published their 1980 schedule, which featured such races as the Indianapolis 500, Talladega, and Charlotte. Under an agreement between USAC and CART, the season was to be jointly sanctioned by both series. While USAC withdrew from the agreement after five races, Pocono was one of the few races where the joint-sanctioning took place.

In the aftermath of the 1979 Pocono 500, Pocono Raceway was in bad financial shape. They filed an antitrust lawsuit against CART seeking damages in August 1979, but needed additional money. In February 1980, it was announced that Pocono would be rented by the Indianapolis Motor Speedway for the entire 1980 season and all of the races would be promoted by Indianapolis. The infusion of cash was necessary to pay off creditors. Pocono personnel would continue to work at the track but additional personnel from Indianapolis would come in.

Driving Jim Hall's radical new Chaparral 2K ground effects chassis, Johnny Rutherford won the 1980 Indianapolis 500 in easy fashion.

== Practice ==
Driving for Dan Gurney, Mike Mosley posted the fastest practice speed in Tuesday's practice session at 183.599 mph. Mosley looked to overcome his 32nd-place finish at Indianapolis and provide a boost to the financially strapped Gurney team. Bobby Unser was second at 183.113 mph and Mario Andretti third at 182.113 mph. A.J. Foyt was fourth at 180.723 mph. Rick Mears was fifth at 179.354 mph. Indianapolis champion, Johnny Rutherford's fastest speed was 178.620 mph.

On Wednesday, A. J. Foyt posted the fastest practice speed at 185.460 mph, but competitors questioned if it was a matter of showmanship and running a turbocharger popoff valve outside of legal levels. Mario Andretti was second at 184.351 mph. "There's no way," Andretti said. "Foyt was running 215-220 down the straightaway. There's no way in hell. I did 184 and I'm running 199 on the straights, tops." Suspicious of Foyt's speed, USAC awarded Andretti the prize for fastest practice lap, a dinner for two at a restaurant in Tannersville.

Crewman for Herm Johnson, Greg Nelson, was transported to a local hospital by helicopter when the external starter he was using struck him in the face, suffering lacerations of the mouth and jaw.

== Time Trials ==
On Thursday morning, Mike Mosley posted the fastest practice speed at 185.682 mph and asserted himself as a favorite for the pole.

In the morning three-hour practice session, several cars crashed in separate incidents. Gordon Johncock hit the wall in turn two and Pancho Carter crashed trying to avoid the debris. An hour later, Johncock's Patrick Racing teammate Tom Bagley crashed as well in the same spot. The Patrick team had only one backup car at the track, and Johncock did not like the handling of it when he took practice laps. Bagley qualified the backup while the Patrick team considered bringing another car from Indianapolis for Johncock. Johncock declined, saying the rush would put the crew under too much pressure and withdrew from the race. It was the first time Johncock missed an IndyCar race since Mosport in 1978.

Johnny Rutherford crashed in turn two when he came upon slow cars running in the racing line and swerved to avoid. The car that he won with at Indianapolis was damaged and he switched to a backup car. Mario Andretti and Spike Gehlhausen spun and avoided contact with the wall.

Bobby Unser won the pole with an average speed of 185.491 mph. A.J. Foyt qualified second at an average speed of 184.729 mph. It was reported that Foyt's straightaway speeds were 20 mph faster than anyone else. Some competitors, including Bobby Unser, accused Foyt of using Nitrous Oxide, with Unser saying "You can't prove it, but he was cheating. He doesn't have to do that. It's a shame because he knocked Mike Mosley off the front row."

Johnny Parsons suffered a hard crash during qualifying. Driving the same chassis that Janet Guthrie failed to qualify at Indianapolis with, Parsons cut a right-front tire on his second qualifying lap and hit the turn two wall. Parsons was uninjured but his car was demolished.

In Friday's final day of qualifying, only Herm Johnson and Phil Threshie posted speeds to fill the 33 car field.

== Race ==
At the start of the race, A.J. Foyt extended his lead. After one lap, Gary Bettenhausen fell out of the race with clutch problems. Three laps later, Gary's younger brother Tony Bettenhausen Jr. blew an engine and stalled on track, bringing out the first caution.

On lap 11, Dennis Firestone and Al Loquasto crashed in turn three to bring out the second caution.

Howdy Holmes, Roger Rager, and Jim McElreath crashed in turn three on lap 26. Holmes was the only one able to continue.

The only time Foyt gave up the lead was during pit stop cycles, which allowed Danny Ongais, Bobby Unser, and Mario Andretti to take turns in the lead.

On lap 83, AJ Foyt passed Mario Andretti to put the fourth-placed car one lap down. One lap later, Foyt fell out of the race, while leading, with a blown engine. He had led 67 laps.

Bobby Unser inherited the lead upon Foyt's retirement, and held it with the exception of pitstops until lap 158.

Pancho Carter spun in turn three on lap 151 and brought out the final caution flag of the race. Two laps after the restart, Rutherford passed Unser for the lead on lap 159. Five laps later, Unser passed Rutherford on the frontstretch and retook the lead.

After 163 laps, Rick Mears lost an engine while running third and retired from the race.

On his final pitstop, Rutherford stalled the car leaving the pits with a blown clutch and the car had to be push started. Unser led the final 37 laps and won by a margin of 21 seconds over Rutherford.

After the race, Mario Andretti accused AJ Foyt of cheating. "There was no way he could have pulled out and passed us the way he was doing it if everything was legal. No way, it's not in the car, my friends." Andretti questioned whether Foyt had exceeded the legal level of turbo boost, saying, "there's no way he could be running with 48 inches."

Foyt claimed his speed was due to aggressive engine tuning to keep up with ground-effects cars. "We knew it would be marginal. We were turning excessive RPMs, but we had to do that to keep up with the ground-effects racers. I knew it would be touch and go. I knew it would be a gamble, and the engine just broke."

== Box score ==
Finish	Grid	No	Name	Entrant	Chassis	Engine	Laps	Time/Status	Led	Points
1	1	11	(United States) Bobby Unser	Penske Racing	Penske PC-9	Cosworth	200	3:18:4.810	116	1000
2	5	4	(United States) Johnny Rutherford	Chaparral Racing	Chaparral 2K	Cosworth	200	+21.03	6	800
3	10	9	(United States) Tom Sneva	Jerry O'Connell Racing	McLaren M24	Cosworth	198	+2 Laps	0	700
4	8	41	(United States) Bill Alsup	Alsup Racing	Penske PC-7	Cosworth	194	+6 Laps	0	600
5	27	34	(Australia) Vern Schuppan	Wysard Motor Co.	Wildcat Mk2	DGS	193	+7 Laps	0	500
6	14	10	(United States) Pancho Carter	Alex Morales Motorsports	Lightning	Cosworth	193	+7 Laps	4	400
7	17	24	(United States) Sheldon Kinser	Leader Card Racers	Watson	Cosworth	192	+8 Laps	2	300
8	19	43	(United States) Howdy Holmes	Armstrong Mould Racing Team	Lola T500	Cosworth	190	+10 Laps	0	250
9	24	95	(United States) Larry Cannon	Kraco Racing	Wildcat Mk1	DGS	188	+12 Laps	0	200
10	26	81	(United States) Lee Kunzman	O'Hanlon Racing Team	McLaren M24	Cosworth	183	+17 Laps	0	150
11	32	28	(United States) Herm Johnson	Cliff-Menard Racing	Lightning	Offenhauser	182	+18 Laps	0	100
12	7	1	(United States) Rick Mears	Penske Racing	Penske PC-9	Cosworth	163	Engine	0	50
13	20	29	(United States) Billy Engelhart	Beaudoin Racing	McLaren M24	Cosworth	133	Turbocharger	0	25
14	6	7	(United States) Jerry Sneva	Armstrong Mould Racing Team	Lola T500	Cosworth	117	Ignition	0	25
15	23	38	(United States) Jerry Karl	William Compton	McLaren M16E	Chevrolet	112	+88 Laps	0	25
16	28	47	(Italy) Phil Caliva	Alsup Racing	McLaren M16C	Offenhauser	110	Ignition	0	25
17	3	12	(United States) Mario Andretti	Penske Racing	Penske PC-9	Cosworth	105	Transmission	4	20
18	9	25	(United States) Danny Ongais	Interscope Racing	Parnelli VPJ6B	Cosworth	99	Clutch	1	20
19	2	14	(United States) A. J. Foyt	A. J. Foyt Enterprises	Parnelli VPJ6C	Cosworth	85	Valve	67	20
20	21	37	(United States) John Martin	J&J Enterprises	Wildcat Mk1	DGS	78	Gearbox	0	20
21	16	8	(United States) Dick Simon	Vollstedt Enterprises	Vollstedt	Offenhauser	74	Gearbox	0	15
22	22	59	(United States) Joe Saldana	Hoffman Racing	Lightning	Offenhauser	73	Piston	0	15
23	4	48	(United States) Mike Mosley	All American Racers	Eagle 80	Chevrolet	45	Piston	0	15
24	12	5	(United States) Al Unser	Longhorn Racing	Longhorn LR01	Cosworth	34	Handling	0	15
25	33	30	(United States) Phil Threshie	Machinists Union Racing	IAM 001	Chevrolet	26	Transmission	0	10
26	15	66	(United States) Roger Rager	Roger Rager	Wildcat Mk3	Chevrolet	25	Crash	0	10
27	29	97	(United States) Jim McElreath	McElreath Racing	King	Chevrolet	25	Crash	0	10
28	13	2	(United States) Bill Vukovich II	Leader Card Racers	Watson	Offenhauser	23	Piston	0	10
29	11	40	(United States) Tom Bagley	Patrick Racing	Wildcat Mk4	Cosworth	16	Handling	0	5
30	18	18	(Australia) Dennis Firestone	Scientific Drilling Controls Racing	Penske PC-6	Cosworth	10	Crash	0	5
31	30	86	(United States) Al Loquasto	Pacific Coast Racing	Lightning	Cosworth	10	Suspension	0	5
32	31	32	(United States) Tony Bettenhausen Jr.	Medlin Racing	Eagle	Offenhauser	4	Piston	0	5
33	25	46	(United States) Gary Bettenhausen	Armstrong Mould Racing Team	Wildcat Mk2	DGS	1	Clutch	0	5

=== Race Statistics ===
- Average Speed: 151.454 mph (243.742 km/h)
- Lead changes: 16 among 7 drivers

Lap Leaders
From Lap	To Lap	Total Laps	Leader
1	8	8	A.J. Foyt
9	9	1	Mario Andretti
10	12	3	A.J. Foyt
13	14	2	Sheldon Kinser
15	18	4	Pancho Carter
19	26	8	A.J. Foyt
27	27	1	Danny Ongais
28	53	26	A.J. Foyt
54	57	4	Bobby Unser
58	60	3	Mario Andretti
61	82	22	A.J. Foyt
83	135	53	Bobby Unser
136	136	1	Johnny Rutherford
137	158	22	Bobby Unser
159	163	5	Johnny Rutherford
164	200	37	Bobby Unser

== Standings after the race ==
Drivers' Championship standings

Pos	Driver	Points
1	(United States) Johnny Rutherford	2440
2	(United States) Tom Sneva	1940
3	(United States) Bobby Unser	1326
4	(United States) Gordon Johncock	1090
5	(United States) Pancho Carter	988

== Television ==
For the first time since the 1974 race, the Pocono 500 was televised on ABC Wide World of Sports. The race aired on July 26, paired with USA vs West Germany Gymnastics. Al Michaels and Jackie Stewart called the race with Chris Economaki reporting from the pits.
