= Michel Jourdain =

Michel Jourdain may refer to:

- Michel Jourdain Sr., CART driver
- Michel Jourdain Jr., CART & NASCAR driver
