= Jeff Heywood =

American racing driver

Jeffrey Lynn Heywood (born December 20, 1951) is an American former racing driver from Mission Hills, California. A notable west coast sprint car racer, he raced in the 1980 CART Championship Car California 500 at Ontario Motor Speedway in the Pacific Coast Racing Lightning-Offy. Starting 36th, he was knocked out after 14 laps by an oil leak and was credited with 32nd place.

== American Open Wheel racing results ==
=== PPG IndyCar Series ===
(key) (Races in bold indicate pole position)

Year	Team	Chassis	Engine	1	2	3	4	5	6	7	8	9	10	11	12	Rank	Points
1980	Pacific Coast Racing	Lightning Mk1/77	Offy Drake	ONT	INDY	MIL	POC	MDO	MCH	WGL	MIL	ONT; 32	MCH	MEX	PHX	**63rd**	**5**
