= Juan Carlos Bolaños =

Mexican racing driver (born 1946)

Juan Carlos Bolaños (born November 10, 1946) is a Mexican former racing driver from Mexico City. He was a long time sports car racer who practiced a car for the 1972 24 Hours of Le Mans but did not compete, but did drive in the 1975 24 Hours of Le Mans in the same Porsche 911 and finished ninth overall and fifth in class. The team moved up to a Porsche 935 Group 5 car in 1976 but failed to finish. Later in his career, Bolaños rented another team's car and competed in the 1980 CART Championship Car Primera Copa Indy 150 at Autodromo Hermanos Rodriguez in his hometown. He qualified 21st in the 25 car field but was knocked out after nine laps by engine failure. He was one of three Mexican drivers to make their first and only CART start in the race along with Michel Jourdain Sr. and Daniel Muñiz. He was the national Formula Ford Champion in 1977 & 1978. He also raced at the 24 Hours of Daytona in 1975 starting sixth overall with a time of 1:58.952 in a 911 Porsche Carrera.
