= Daniel Muñiz =

Mexican racing driver (born 1947)

Daniel Muñiz (born March 2, 1947) is a Mexican former racing driver from Mexico City. A sports car racer and Formula Atlantic driver who competed for numerous different teams throughout the 1970s, Muniz purchased one of Pat Patrick's cars to compete in the 1980 CART Championship Car Primera Copa Indy 150 at Autodromo Hermanos Rodriguez in his hometown. He qualified 16th in the 25 car field, but was knocked out after 12 laps by engine failure. He was one of three Mexican drivers to make their first CART start in the race along with Michel Jourdain Sr. and Juan Carlos Bolaños.
