= Ross Davis (racing driver) =

American racing driver (born 1950)

Ross Davis (born June 3, 1950) is a former American racing driver from Grand Junction, Colorado who competed in the CART Championship Car series in 1980 and 1981. He made five starts as an owner-driver with a best finish of 13th place at Watkins Glen International in 1981 and finished 36th in the 1981 championship. He attempted but failed to qualify for three additional races in the 1981 season. He is reported to currently live in Boise, Idaho.
