= Greg Leffler =

American racing driver

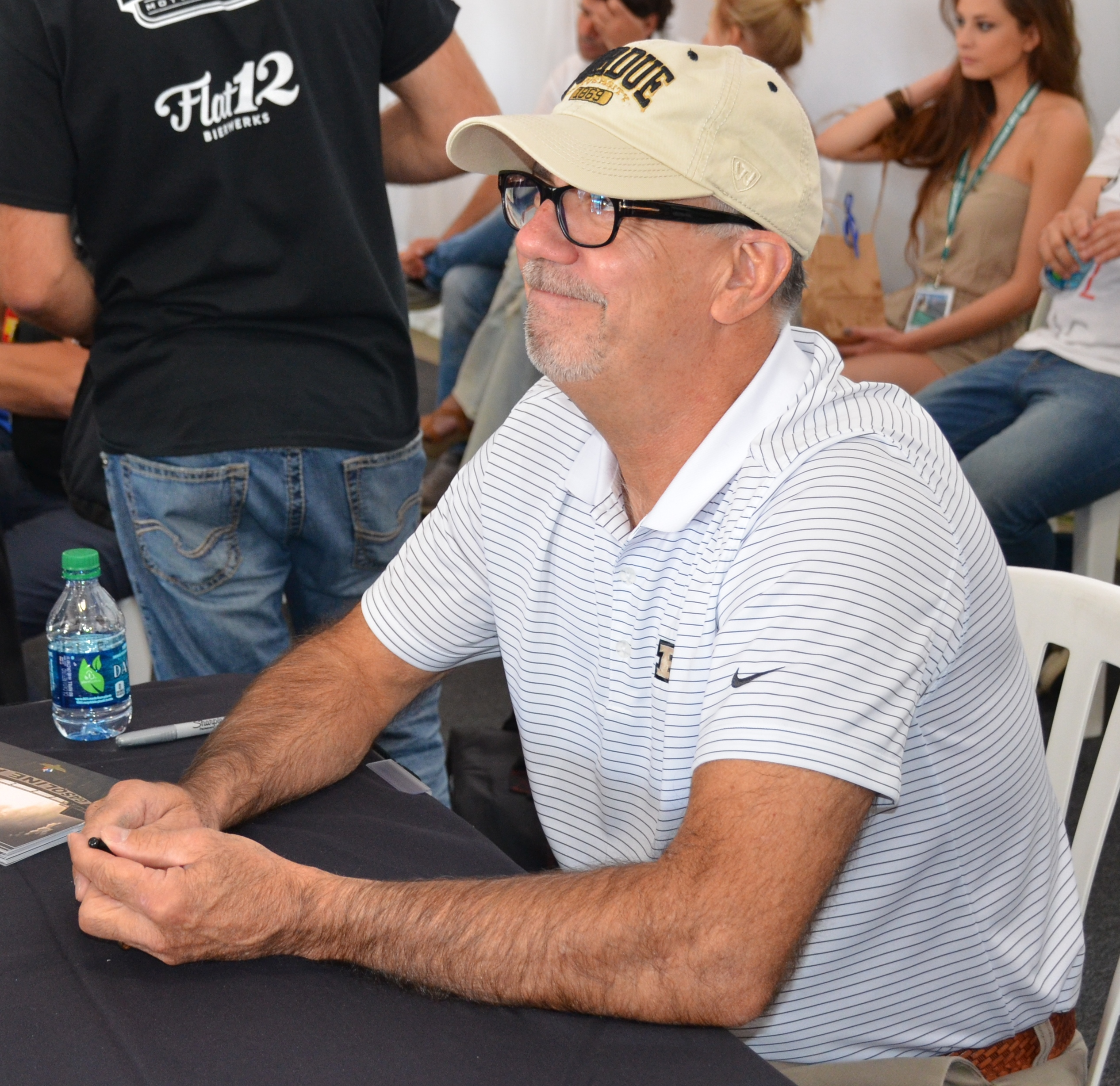
- Born: December 27, 1951 (age 74); Indianapolis, Indiana, U.S.
- Achievements: 1979 USAC National Sprint Car Series Champion

Champ Car career
- 13 races run over 4 years
- Years active: 1980–1983
- Team(s): No. 44/43 (Sherman Armstrong); No. 64 (Jet Engineering)
- Best finish: 6th Riverside California (1982)
- First race: 1980 Indianapolis 500 Finished 10th (Indianapolis)
- Last race: 1983 Escort Radar Warning 200 Finished 11th (Mid-Ohio)
Wins	Podiums	Poles
0	0	0

Greg Leffler (born December 27, 1951), is a former driver in the CART Championship Car series.

== Career ==
Leffler raced in the 1980–1983 seasons, with 13 career starts, including the 1980 Indianapolis 500. He finished in the top-ten twice, with his best finish in sixth position in 1982 at Riverside. In 1979, Leffler was the USAC Sprint Car National Series Champion.

Leffler lives in Churubusco, Indiana.
