= Tom Gloy =

American sports car racing driver

- Born: June 11, 1947 (age 79); Lafayette, California, U.S.
- Achievements: 1979 Formula Atlantic Champion; 1984 Trans-Am Series Champion
- Awards: West Coast Stock Car Hall of Fame (2021)

Champ Car career
- 7 races run over 4 years
- Years active: 1977-1978, 1980, 1984
- Best finish: 14th - 1980
- First race: 1977 Bobby Ball 150 (Phoenix)
- Last race: 1984 Budweiser Cleveland Grand Prix (Cleveland)
Wins	Podiums	Poles
0	0	0

Thomas Henry Gloy (born June 11, 1947 in Lafayette, California) is an American former auto racing driver in the USAC and CART Championship Car series. He raced in the 1977, 1980 and 1984 seasons, with seven combined career starts, including the 1984 Indianapolis 500. He had three top-ten finishes, with a best of fifth at Ontario in 1980. He finished 14th in CART points that year despite only competing in three races, a result of finishing each of them in the top-ten.

In 1979, Gloy won the Formula Atlantic Series Championship. In 1985, he competed in the IROC series as the representative from Sports Car Club of America (SCCA), earned by winning the 1984 Trans-Am Championship.

Gloy co-owned Gloy-Rahal Racing in NASCAR's Craftsman Truck Series with Bobby Rahal from 1997 to 1999. The team often fielded trucks for veterans of the Trans-Am series. Gloy was later president of Blair Racing, which fielded a Dallara-Chevrolet driven by Alex Barron for the IRL IndyCar Series in 2002.

== Motorsports Career Results ==
=== American Open-Wheel ===
==== CART ====
(key) (Races in Bold indicate pole position)

Year	Team	Chassis	Engine	1	2	3	4	5	6	7	8	9	10	11	12	13	14	15	16	Rank	Points	Ref
**1980**	Team Penske	Penske PC-7	Cosworth	ONT	INDY	MIL	POC	MDO; 6	MCH	WGL	MIL	ONT; 5	MCH; 9	MEX	PHX					**14th**	**680**	
**1984**	Galles Racing	March 84C	Cosworth	LBH	PHX	INDY; 14	MIL	POR	MEA; 16	CLE; 23	MCH	ROA	POC	MDO	SAN	MCH	PHX	LAG	CPL	-	**0**	

- New Points system introduced in 1981

Sporting positions
Preceded by Howdy Holmes	North American Formula Atlantic Champion; 1979	Succeeded by Jacques Villeneuve
