= Bob Frey =

American racing driver

Robert C. Frey (born October 25, 1950) is an American former racing driver from Elyria, Ohio. He was a notable sprint car driver who won some of the country's most prestigious races when he attempted to try his hand at CART Championship Car racing in 1980. His first attempt to qualify for a race at the Pocono Raceway ended in a practice crash. His first race came in September of that year at the Michigan International Speedway and he finished 17th. The following year, Frey notched his best CART finish of 13th at Phoenix International Raceway but then failed to qualify his eight-year-old Eagle-Offy for the 1981 Indianapolis 500. He returned the week after the Indy 500 and drove in the Milwaukee Mile race, finishing 17th. Frey returned in 1982 with a much newer 1981 Eagle chassis but failed to qualify for both the Indy 500 and the Milwaukee race, after which he returned to sprint cars.

Frey operated a mortuary in Arizona prior to retiring.

== Legacy ==
Frey was inducted in the National Sprint Car Hall of Fame in 2022.
