= Penske PC-9 =

Penske PC-9 Penske PC-9B
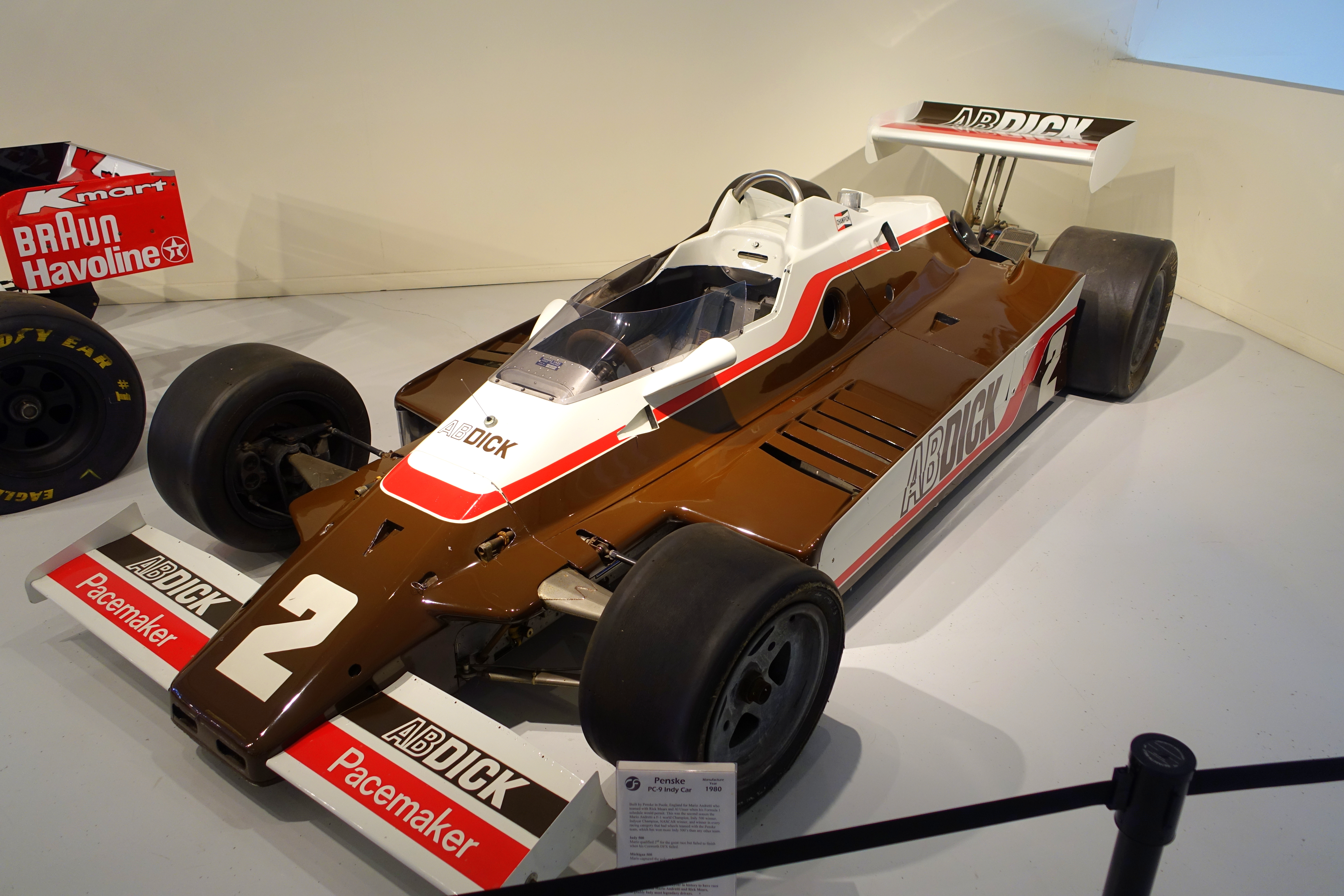
- Category: CART IndyCar
- Constructor: Penske
- Designer: Geoff Ferris
- Predecessor: Penske PC-7
- Successor: Penske PC-10

Technical specifications
- Chassis: Aluminum Monocoque
- Suspension: Inboard springs and Fox shocks front and rear, operated by top rocker arm with front and lower rear A arms of streamline tubing
- Engine: Cosworth DFX 2,650 cc (161.7 cu in) V8 80° Mid-engined, longitudinally mounted
- Transmission: Hewland L.G.500 4 speed manual
- Weight: 1,550 lb (703.1 kg)
- Fuel: Methanol, supplied by Mobil
- Tyres: Goodyear Eagle Speedway Specials - Rear 27.0x14.5-15 - Front 25.5x10.0-15

Competition history
- Notable entrants: Penske Racing
- Notable drivers: Rick Mears; Bobby Unser; Mario Andretti; Tom Gloy; Bill Alsup

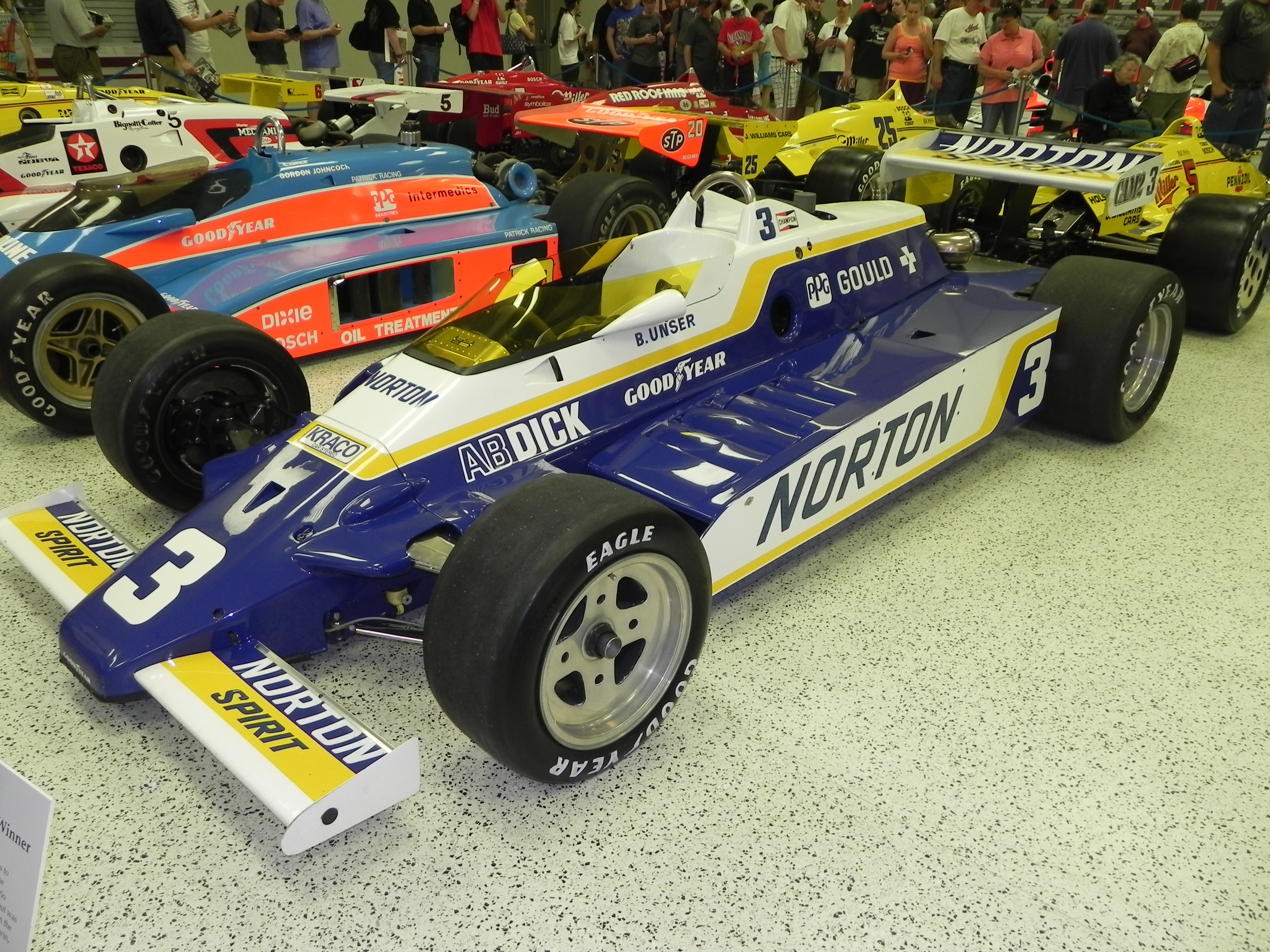
1981 Indy 500-winning Penske PC-9B chassis of Bobby Unser

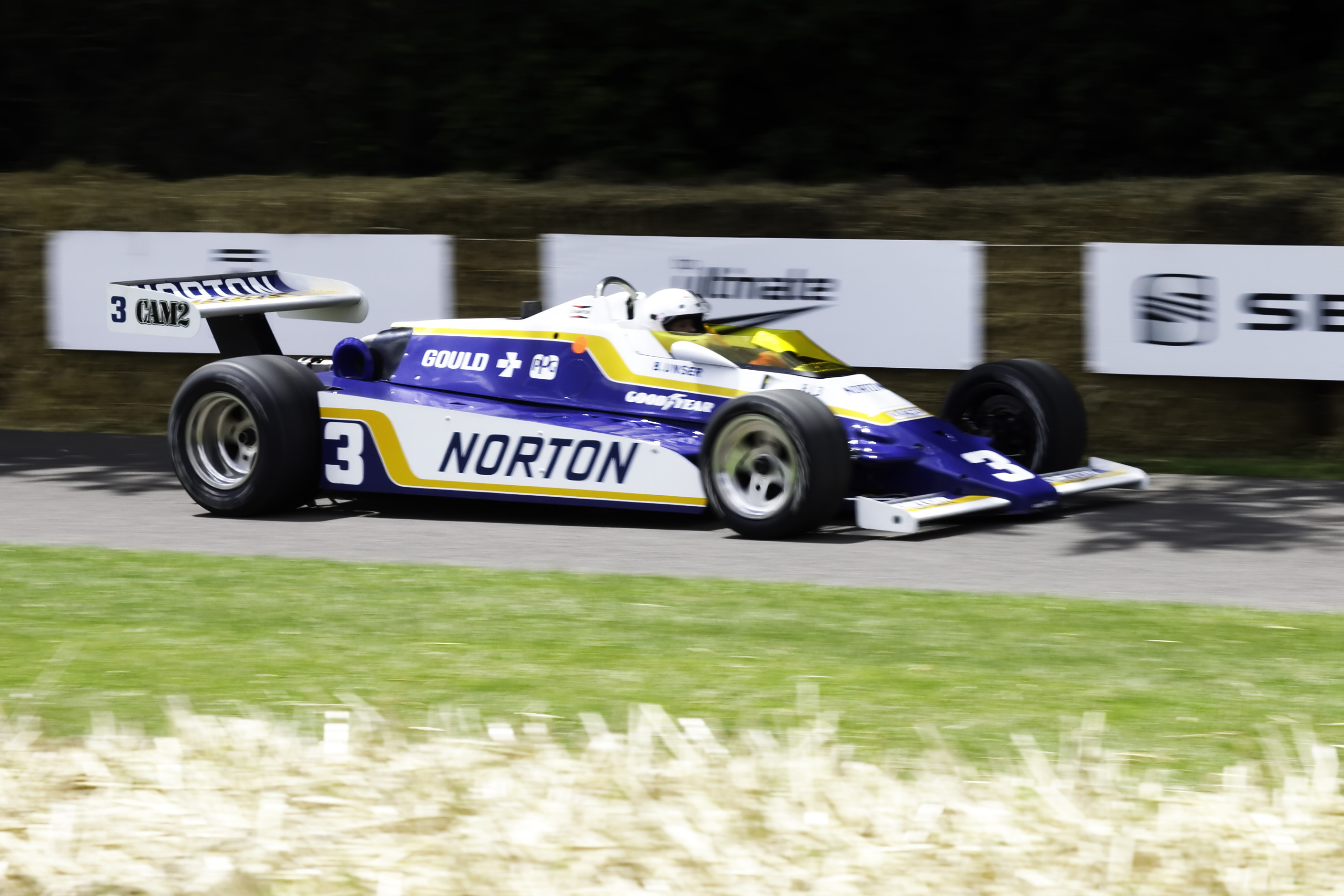
Penske PC-9B being demonstrated at the 2011 Goodwood Festival of Speed

The Penske PC-9, Penske PC-9B, and Penske PC-9C are USAC and CART open-wheel race car chassis, designed by British designer Geoff Ferris at Penske Racing, which was constructed for competition in the 1980 and 1981 IndyCar seasons, as well as the 1980 season and 1981–82 USAC Champ Car seasons. It also won the 1981 Indianapolis 500, being driven by Bobby Unser.
