= Jan Sneva =

American racing driver

Jan J. Sneva (born August 17, 1953, in Spokane, Washington) is an American former race car driver, and the brother of Jerry Sneva, as well as Indianapolis 500 winner Tom Sneva.

The youngest of the three brothers, Sneva was primarily a midget car and sprint car racer, but he made two starts in the USAC Championship Car series (one each in 1979 and 1981 at Milwaukee and Pocono respectively) and one start in the CART Champ Car series when he finished tenth in the April 1980 race at the Ontario Motor Speedway. He also attempted to qualify for the Indianapolis 500 twice but failed rookie orientation in 1980 and failed to qualify in 1982. He now resides in Mesa, Arizona.
