= Chaparral 2K =

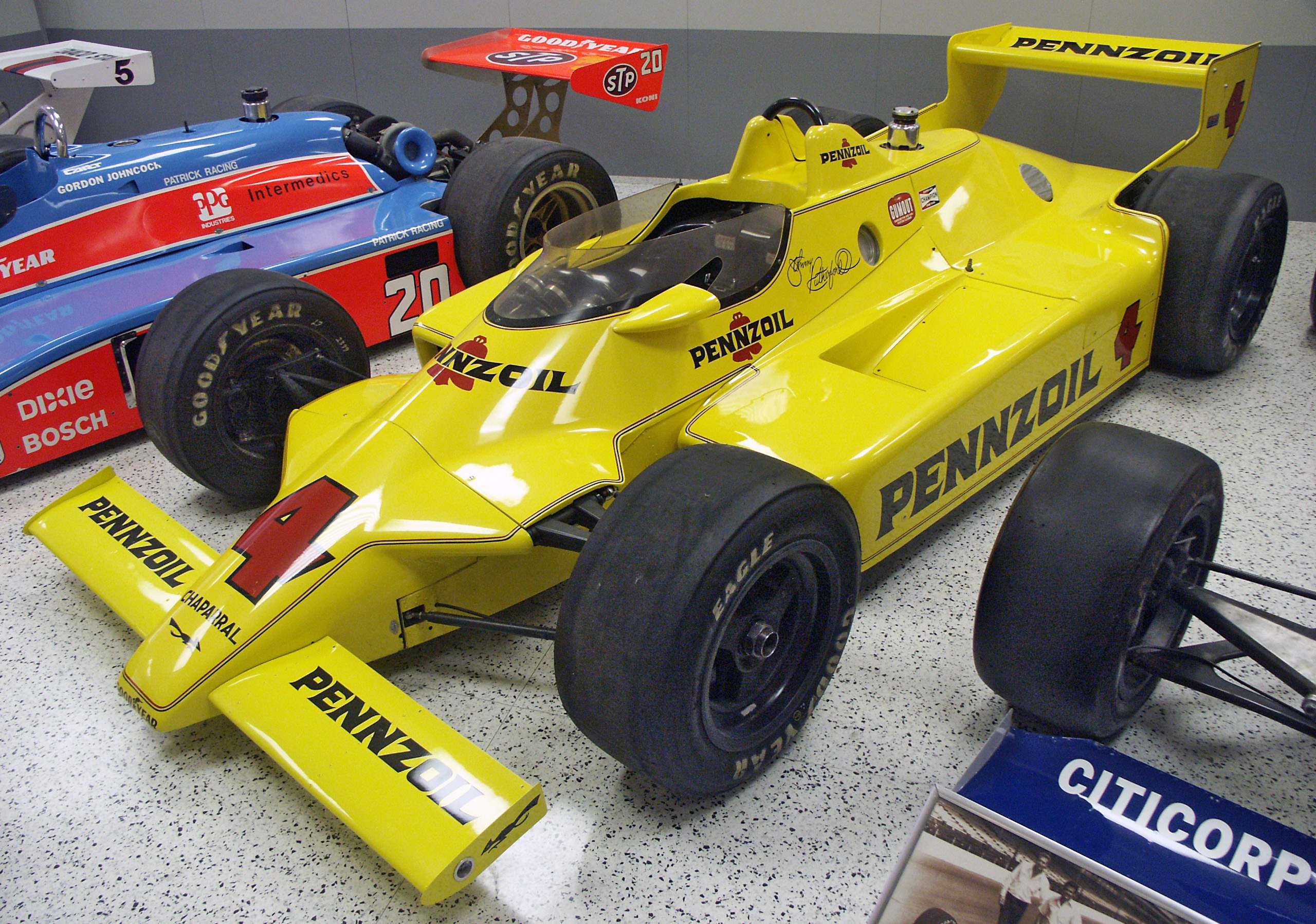
- Category: CART IndyCar
- Constructor: Chaparral
- Designer: John Barnard

Technical specifications
- Chassis: Aluminum monocoque, fiberglass body
- Suspension (front): Lower wishbones, top rockers, in-board coil springs over shock absorbers, anti-roll bar
- Suspension (rear): Double wishbones, coil springs over dampers, anti-roll bar
- Length: 4,572 mm (180 in)
- Width: 2,032 mm (80 in)
- Height: 965 mm (38 in)
- Axle track: 1,702 mm (67 in) (Front); 1,600 mm (63 in) (Rear)
- Wheelbase: 2,692 mm (106 in)
- Engine: Ford-Cosworth DFX 2.65 L (2,650 cc; 162 cu in) 90° V8 turbocharged mid-engined
- Transmission: Weismann 4-speed manual
- Power: 780 hp (582 kW); 450 N⋅m (332 lb⋅ft)
- Weight: 1,550 lb (700 kg)
- Fuel: Methanol
- Tyres: Goodyear

Competition history
- Debut: 1979 Arizona Republic/Jimmy Bryan 150

The Chaparral 2K is an open-wheel racing car chassis, designed by British designer and engineer John Barnard and built by Lola Cars that competed in the CART open-wheel racing series, for competition in the 1979 IndyCar season, and competed until 1982.

The 2K famously won the 1980 Indianapolis 500, driven by Johnny Rutherford and in the process dispelling the myth that ground effect would not work on the high speed ovals such as the Indianapolis Motor Speedway.

== Results ==
Year	Chassis	Engine	Drivers	No.	1	2	3	4	5	6	7	8	9	10	11	12	13	14	Pts	Pos
1979					PHX	ATL	ATL	INDY	TRE	TRE	MCH	MCH	WGL	TRE	ONT	MCH	ATL	PHX		
1979	Chaparral 2K	Cosworth DFX	(United States) Al Unser Sr.	2				22	2	12	13	3	5		5	10	5	1	2,085	5th
1980					ONT	INDY	MIL	POC	MDO	MCH	WGL	MIL	ONT	MCH	MXC	PHX				
1980	Chaparral 2K	Cosworth DFX	(United States) Johnny Rutherford	4	1	1	2	2	1	1	5	1	2	4	10	13			4,723	1st
1981					PHX	MIL	ATL	ATL	MCH	RIV	MIL	MCH	WGL	MXC	PHX					
1981	Chaparral 2K	Cosworth DFX	(United States) Johnny Rutherford	1	1*	6	2*	3	22	21	4	20	2	26	21				120	5th
1982					PHX	ATL	MIL	CLE	MCH	MIL	POC	RIV	ROA	MCH	PHX					
1982	Chaparral 2K	Cosworth DFX	(United States) Johnny Rutherford	5	4		15	23	28	17	12	3	12	DNS	21				62	12th
