= Jerry Miller (racing driver) =

American racing driver (1937–2018)

Jerry Wayne Miller (December 10, 1937 – November 16, 2018) was an American racing driver from Salem, Indiana who excelled at sprint car racing and made a three-year foray into Championship Car.

One of the top sprint car racers in the midwest, Miller attempted to complete rookie orientation for the Indianapolis 500 in 1979 but failed to do so. Later that year, he competed in his first Champ Car race, a USAC event at the Milwaukee Mile and finished ninth in a field weakened by the founding of the rival CART series that year. His single appearance was enough to earn him 25th place in the USAC National Championship. In 1980, Miller made his only CART start, a 14th place in the season-ender at Phoenix International Raceway. In 1981, he brought the same Chevrolet powered King chassis back to Indianapolis to attempt to qualify for the "500" again. He completed rookie orientation that time, but failed to make the field. As the USAC/CART split continued that year, Miller made two more champ car starts, this time on the dirt oval events that had become a part of the USAC "Gold Crown" Championship, with finishes of ninth and 19th.

Miller died in 2018.
