= Billy Engelhart =

American racing driver (born 1942)

Billy Engelhart (born March 20, 1942, in Madison, Wisconsin), is an American former driver in the CART Championship Car series. He raced in the 1980–81 seasons, with nine career starts, including the 1980 Indianapolis 500. He finished in the top-ten four times, with his best finish in eighth position in 1981 at Milwaukee.
