= Dean Vetrock =

American racing driver

Dean Vetrock (born November 5, 1954) is an American former racing driver from Racine, Wisconsin. He competed primarily in the Formula 5000 series and then its successor, the F5000-based Can-Am formula. In June 1981, Vetrock and his friend Larrie Ervin entered an aging chassis in the USAC "Gold Crown" Championship Car race at the Pocono Raceway and were invited to enter a car in the 1982 Indianapolis 500. By participating in the Pocono race, Vetrock was also suspended from racing in CART for 60 days despite never racing in a CART event, though the decision was later reversed. Vetrock and Ervin purchased a newer chassis for the Indy 500 and were given a garage stall that A. J. Foyt Enterprises typically used to store its tools. However, they blew their only race engine on the second day that the car was on track without completing a practice lap. Vetrock returned to Can-Am, eventually retiring in the late 1980s and Ervin retired from race team ownership.
