= Roger Rager =

American racing driver (1948–2022)

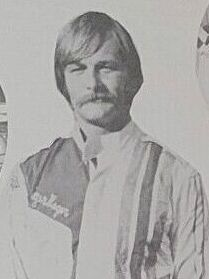
Rager circa 1975

Roger Rager (September 3, 1948 – February 16, 2022) was an American racing driver in the USAC and CART Championship Car series.

== Early life ==
Rager was born on September 3, 1948, in Lincoln, Nebraska. When he was four years old he ran a "space ship" go-kart around a track during an intermission for a race program that included his dad, Bob, at the Nebraska State Fair in Lincoln. At age 14, Rager purchased a stock car for $35 and raced at a local track. He later moved to Lincoln and raced on weekends. His first sprint win was at Jefferson County Speedway in Nebraska.

== Career ==
Rager enjoyed numerous milestones as a sprint car racer in the early 1970s. He won many races all over the country and also was the United States captain for a sprint car team competing in South Africa in 1973. He returned to North America and moved to the Twin Cities in the mid-1970s. It was about that time that Rager also set a world record for the fastest lap on a one-mile dirt track, piloting a spring car without a wing. He also won the points championship at the famed Knoxville track. He would become the only driver to win at Knoxville in the 1960s, 1970s, 1980s, 1990s and 2000s.

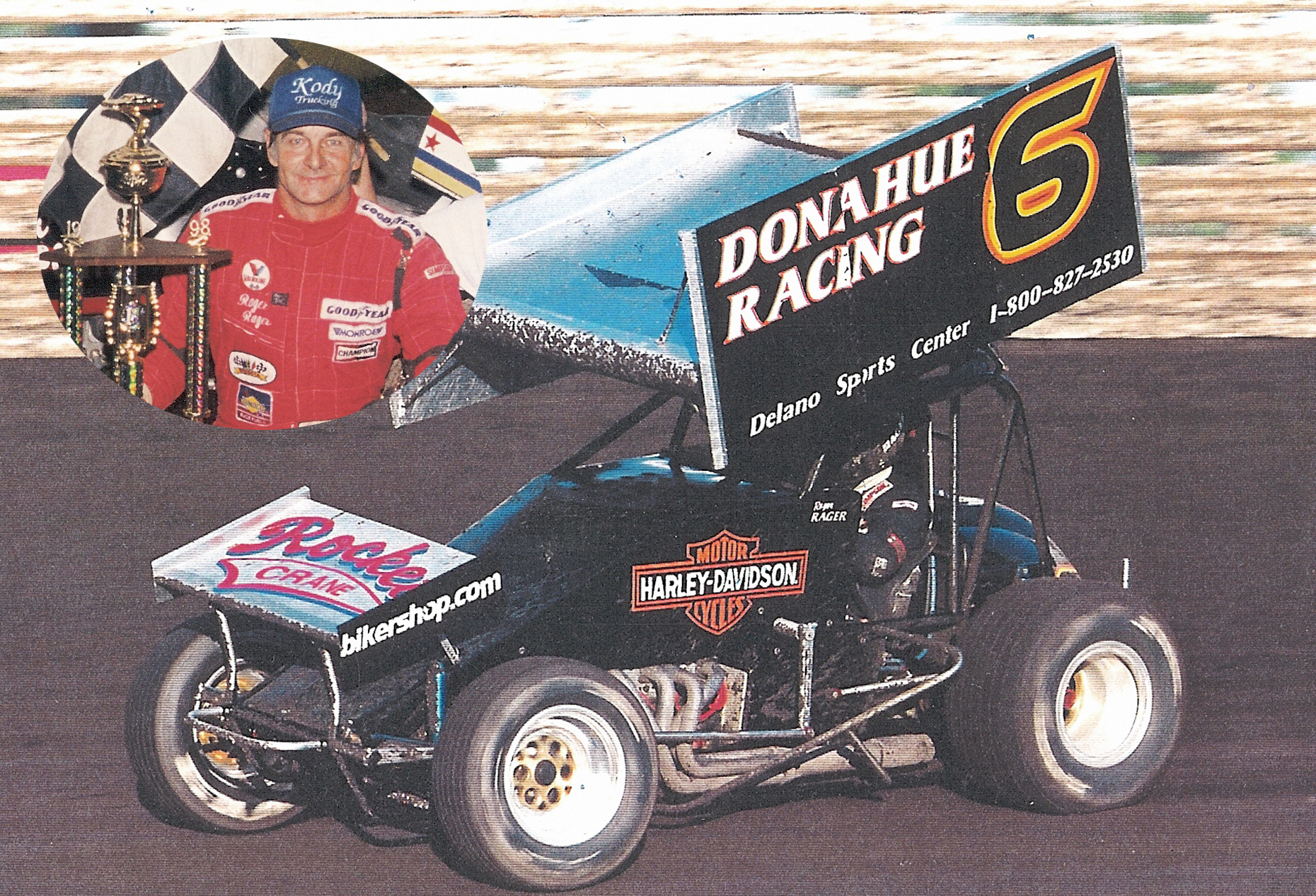
Roger Rager with one of his winning cars

Rager had many accomplishments as a sprint car racer, but he changed his race focus to the Indy Car series in the late 1970s. Rager started running some USAC events in 1976 and made his first Indy 500 qualifying attempt in 1977. His qualifying run ended in a crash at 190 mph. Despite running on a small budget against some million dollar race teams, Rager just missed qualifying at the Brickyard by one spot in 1979. He did make the Indy 500 field in 1980 with the tenth fastest qualifying time.

"I had A. J. Foyt on the outside of my (fourth) row, so I thought I would follow him and he actually was slowing me down," Rager said of the legendary racer. Rager not only was leading Foyt, but the entire Indy 500 field for two laps. Rager finished his Indy Car career with six top-ten finishes in 23 starts in USAC or CART events. He was also a USAC Rookie of the Year in 1980.

Rager's focus returned to sprint car racing in the mid-1980s when he was asked to drive for a guy at the speedway in Jackson, Minn. He also left the Twin Cities and purchased a resort on Loon Lake, just west of Pequot Lakes, in 1988. Rager's time in a sprint car started to dwindle as he focused much of his time on building up the resort. He eventually took time off from racing.

Shortly before turning 50, Rager received an offer to drive a sprint car at Cedar Lake Speedway in Wisconsin. "I finally said I would drive one time, but I finished second in the heat and feature," he recalled. "I figured if it's still this easy, maybe I should start driving again." Rager continued racing for the next ten years and continued to enjoy success by winning an additional 30 features, including four at Knoxville Raceway. One of those races was a national qualifier in the 360 class. He also was a Masters Champion three times in six years at Knoxville. In 1990, Rager was inducted into Knoxville Hall of Fame.

== Retirement and death ==
Rager retired after being inaugurated into the National Sprint Car Hall of Fame May 29, 2009. Living in Pequot Lakes, Minnesota, he owned Rager's Acres Seasonal RV Park on Loon Lake.

On June 22, 2011, Rager was inducted into the Big Car Racing Association (BCRA) Hall of Fame. He died on February 16, 2022, at the age of 73.

== Awards and honors ==
United States Auto Club (USAC) Rookie of the Year, "Action Track" Driver of the Year, Captain of the United States Sprint Car Team in South Africa, Track Championship at Knoxville, IA and Minneapolis (North Star Speedway), Washington State Championship, NSS - National Champion 2000 and 2001, Knoxville, IA Masters Champion 2 out of 3 years, Knoxville Hall of Fame, Member of the elite "Leaders Circle Club", National Sprint Car Hall of Fame and BCRA Hall of Fame.

== Racing record ==
=== Complete USAC Mini-Indy Series results ===
Year	Entrant	1	2	3	4	5	6	7	8	Pos	Points
1979		TEX1	IRP	MIL1	POC	TEX2	MIL2	MIN1; 10	MIN2; 7	**22nd**	**90**
1980		MIL	POC	MOH	MIN1; 13	MIN2; 10	ONT			**29th**	**35**

=== USAC Championship Car results ===
(key) (Races in bold indicate pole position)

Year	Team	1	2	3	4	5	6	7	8	9	10	11	12	13	14	15	16	17	18	Rank	Points
1976	Dick Simon	PHX	TRE	INDY	MIL	POC	MCH	TWS	TRE; 20	MIL; 10	ONT; 17	MCH; 16	TWS	PHX						33rd	60
1978	Agajanian-King	PHX	ONT	TWS	TRE	INDY; DNQ	MOS	MIL; DNQ	POC; DNQ	MCH; DNQ										41st	15
1978	Wayne Woodward										ATL; 12	TWS	MIL	ONT	MCH	TRE	SIL	BRH	PHX	41st	15
1979	Roger Rager	ONT	TWS	INDY; DNQ	MIL; 10	POC; Wth	TWS; 15	MIL; 16												26th	65
1980	Roger Rager	ONT	INDY; 23	MIL	POC; 26	MOH; 8														27th	100
1981–82	Seymour Enterprises	INDY; DNQ	POC; 8																	20th	350
1981–82	J.F. McCray			ILL; 8	DUQ	ISF; DNQ														20th	350
1981–82	Indiana Coal						INDY; DNQ													20th	350
1982–83	Johnny Vance	SPR; 26																		39th	4
1982–83	W&W Molded Plastics		DUQ; DNQ	NAZ																39th	4
1982–83	Frito-Lay Racer				INDY; DNQ															39th	4

=== CART results ===
(key) (Races in bold indicate pole position)

Year	Team	1	2	3	4	5	6	7	8	9	10	11	12	Rank	Points	Ref
1980	Roger Rager	ONT	INDY; 23	MIL	POC; 26	MOH; 8	MCH; 24	WGL	MIL; 8	ONT; 11	MCH	MEX; 11	PHX; 10	18th	381	
1981	Seymour Enterprises	PHX	MIL	ATL	ATL	MCH; 13								30th	10	
1981	J.F. McCray						RIV; 13	MIL; 18	MCH; 21	WGL; DNQ	MEX	PHX; DNQ		30th	10	

=== Indianapolis 500 ===
Year	Chassis	Engine	Start	Finish	Team
1980	Wildcat	Chevrolet	10	23	Roger Rager

== Sources ==
- 1980 Indy 500 stats
- Roger Rager at ChampCarStats.com
- Nebraska Auto Racing Hall of Fame
- National Sprint Car Hall of Fame
- Bill Carlson, MN 22:52, 7 October 2010 (UTC) added/edited content
- Rager's Acres Seasonal RV Park
