= Michel Jourdain Sr. =

Mexican racing driver (born 1947)

Michel Jourdain Sr., a.k.a. Michel Jourdain Declercq (born August 25, 1947) is a Mexican former racing driver from Mexico City.

Born in Belgium, Jourdain's family emigrated to Mexico when he was 4. Jourdain competed in a number of different Mexican racing series and competed in the CART's 1980 Primera Copa Indy 150 at Autódromo Hermanos Rodríguez in his hometown of Mexico City. He started 20th in an Offenhauser powered Eagle but was knocked out after five laps by an oil line failure. He entered the race two weeks later at Phoenix but failed to qualify. He drove in the 1981 Mexico City race but was again knocked out by an oil line failure after 18 laps. He competed in the Baja 1000 in 2004 and 2005 alongside his son Michel Jr. and brother Bernard who both also competed in CART. They won the Baja Challenge class for Celebrity Pro-Am teams in 2004 and placed third in 2005.

Jourdain is also a motorsport promoter and track owner. In 1984 he founded the Mexican Fórmula K, later Formula 2 and Formula 3000. He became manager of the Autódromo Hermanos Rodríguez in the 1990s. In 1997 he founded the Copa Mustang. In 2004, he became manager of the Desafío Corona. In 2011, he created the Super Copa Telcel. He has been described as the "Bill France of Mexico", having said in 2003 to have founded 28 different racing series.
