= Jerry Sneva =

American racing driver (1949–2018)

Jerry Sneva (May 23, 1949 – January 27, 2018) was an American race driver who drove in the USAC and CART Championship Car series. He raced in the 1977-1982 seasons, with 26 combined career starts, including the Indianapolis 500 in 1977-1980 and 1982. He was named the 1977 Indianapolis 500 Rookie of the Year. He finished in the top-ten five times, with his best finish in fourth position in 1979 at Pocono.

Sneva was the younger brother of 1983 Indianapolis 500 winner Tom Sneva. He died January 27, 2018, at the age of 68.

== Indianapolis 500 results ==
Year	Car	Start	Qual	Rank	Finish	Laps	Led	Retired
1977	36	16	186.616	23	10	187	0	Flagged
1978	30	32	187.266	33	31	18	0	Transmission
1979	73	21	184.379	28	31	16	0	Piston
1980	7	5	187.852	6	17	130	0	Crash T1
1981	Failed to qualify							
1982	69	28	195.270	26	23	61	0	Crash T2
1983	Replaced by Dick Ferguson							
1984	Practice crash - injured							
Totals						412	0	

Starts	5
Poles	0
Front Row	0
Wins	0
Top 5	0
Top 10	1
Retired	4

Sporting positions
Preceded by Vern Schuppan	Indianapolis 500; Rookie of the Year; 1977	Succeeded by Larry Rice; Rick Mears
