= 1983 Pocono 500 =

(United States) 1983 Pocono 500
Race details
- 7th round of the 1983 CART PPG Indy Car World Series season
- Date: August 14, 1983
- Official name: 1983 Domino's Pizza 500
- Location: Long Pond, Pennsylvania
- Course: Permanent racing facility 2.5 mi / 4.023 km
- Distance: 200 laps 500 mi / 804.672 km
- Weather: Temperatures up to 74 °F (23 °C); wind speeds up to 12 miles per hour (19 km/h)

Pole position
- Driver: (United States) Tom Sneva (Bignotti-Cotter Racing)
- Time: 191.848 mph

Podium
- First: (United States) Teo Fabi (Forsythe/Pettit Racing)
- Second: (United States) Al Unser Jr. (Galles Racing)
- Third: (United States) Rick Mears (Team Penske)

The 1983 Pocono 500, the 13th running of the event, was held at the Pocono Raceway in Long Pond, Pennsylvania, on Sunday, August 14, 1983. Branded as the 1983 Domino's Pizza 500 for sponsorship reasons, the race was won by Teo Fabi, the first rookie to win the Pocono 500.

== Triple Crown Million Dollar Bonus ==
On March 8, 1983, Domino's Pizza announced they would offer a one million dollar bonus to any driver who could win IndyCar's Triple Crown of 500 Mile Races: the Indianapolis 500, Michigan 500, and Pocono 500. In 1982, Gordon Johncock won Indianapolis and Michigan before breaking a gearbox while running second at Pocono. If no driver won all three races, Domino's would award a $10,000 prize to the driver that scored the most points in the three races.

== Background ==
In May, Tom Sneva won the Indianapolis 500, the first of his career. In mid-July, John Paul Jr. won the Michigan 500. This meant no driver was going for the Domino's Triple Crown million dollar bonus at Pocono.

Rookie Teo Fabi was attempting to become the first driver to win the pole at all three 500 mile races in one year, having already won the pole at Indianapolis and Michigan.

At Pocono, Johnny Rutherford made his return to Indy Car racing after suffering a broken left foot and ankle at Indianapolis.

== Practice and Time Trials ==
=== Practice - Wednesday, August 10 ===
Wednesday's practice session saw Teo Fabi post the fastest speed at 193.1 mph. Al Unser Jr. was second fastest at 189.0 mph.

=== Practice - Thursday, August 11 ===
Practice and qualifying scheduled for Thursday was canceled. CART required a medical helicopter at all tracks before on-track activity was allowed; due to fog and poor visibility, the helicopter was unable to land at the track when it attempted in the morning. A rainstorm around 2:30 p.m. prevented another landing attempt from the helicopter and washed out any chance of practice.

=== Practice - Friday, August 12 ===
Bobby Rahal led a practice session on Friday at 189.5 mph, followed by Mario Andretti and Danny Ongais. Rain canceled qualifying for the second straight day.

=== Qualifying - Saturday, August 13 ===
In a practice session on Saturday morning, Dick Simon crashed in turn one. Without enough time to repair the car, Simon withdrew from the race.

On Saturday, Indianapolis 500 winner, Tom Sneva, won the pole with a speed of 191.848 mph. Teo Fabi qualified second. Due to CART rule changes since 1982 limiting ground effects, Sneva's pole speed was nine miles per hour slower than Rick Mears' 1982 pole speed.

Kevin Cogan, Danny Ongais, and Steve Chassey had their qualifying times disallowed due to illegal rear-wing heights. That moved Al Loquasto into the field. A promoter's option was invoked which expanded the starting field to 34 cars and allowed Cogan, Ongais, and Chassey to all make the field.

== Track Conditions ==
Heading into the race, Pocono was criticized by drivers for the very rough and bumpy frontstretch. While the track was wide, there were large bumps as it went closer to the pit wall. Teo Fabi was quoted as saying, "The track is not very safe. It makes you very anxious. The straightaway is just impossible."

Pete Halsmer added, "You just can't have 700 horsepower cars jumping up in the air. If I had to rate the safe tracks against those that are unsafe, I'd have to say this one is near the back end."

Rick Mears said, "If you stay in the groove, and there's only one of them in the front straightaway, you're in pretty decent shape. But if you leave the groove, there's a lot of surprises."

Polesitter Tom Sneva said, "It's so rough that passing becomes a serious situation. There are places out there where you just can't pass and keep the car on the ground." He also added, "Drivers make a track unsafe, not the track itself. You just have to use your head more and stay out of trouble. If it feels uncomfortable at 192, then slow down to 188. You have to realize your limitations."

Because of the bumps on the frontstretch, the race was started two-wide instead of the usual three-wide that had been done for over a decade. After the race, Pocono repaved the entire mile-long frontstretch ahead of the 1984 season and eliminated the bumps.

== Race ==
When the race began, Tom Sneva led the first 13 laps. Don Whittington collided with Chip Ganassi and crashed into turn three wall with the right side of the car on lap 12, bringing out the first of a record 10 cautions. Teo Fabi took the lead during pit stops and led for the next 19 laps.

Rick Mears took the lead during pit stops under a caution for debris on lap 36. When the race restarted, the field was led by Desiré Wilson, who was on the tail end of the lead lap. Wilson lost control at the exit of turn one and hit the outside wall. Michigan 500 winner, John Paul Jr drove over the car of Scott Brayton and nearly flew over the wall.

Tom Sneva retook the lead on lap 52 and led for the next 14 laps before stalling in the pit lane on a pit stop. He lost a lap while the crew tried to restart his engine.

After 91 laps, Johnny Rutherford blew a right-front tire and crashed in turn one near the point where he crashed in the 1982 race.

Rick Mears lost radio contact with his crew and resorted to using hand signals to communicate with his crew. Unable to discuss changes for the car, Mears suffered from handling problems and led for the final time on lap 136. After completing 152 laps, Pete Halmer crashed in turn three. Halsmer suffered a fractured left ankle.

Fabi led 116 laps, including the last 64. The Italian earned his first career win. Al Unser Jr. finished second to make a 1-2 finish for rookies.

Rick Mears finished third and clinched the Triple Crown points title. By scoring the most points at IndyCar's 500 mile races, Mears won a $10,000 bonus.

Jim McElreath finished 23rd in what would be the final Indy car race of his career. At 55 years-old, McElreath was the oldest man to run a 500-mile race, a record he held until A. J. Foyt broke it in 1990.

== Box score ==
Finish	Grid	No	Name	Entrant	Chassis	Engine	Laps	Time/Status	Led	Points
1	2	33	(Italy) Teo Fabi	Forsythe Racing	March 83C	Cosworth	200	3:42:28.000	116	21
2	6	17	(United States) Al Unser Jr.	Galles Racing	March 83C	Cosworth	200	+4.000	28	16
3	4	1	(United States) Rick Mears	Penske Racing	Penske PC-10B	Cosworth	200	+23.000	26	14
4	14	18	(United States) Mike Mosley	Kraco Racing	March 83C	Cosworth	199	+1 Lap	0	12
5	3	2	(United States) Bobby Rahal	Truesports	March 83C	Cosworth	199	+1 Lap	0	10
6	13	21	(United States) Pancho Carter	Alex Morales Motorsports	March 82C	Cosworth	198	+2 Laps	0	8
7	9	3	(United States) Mario Andretti	Newman/Haas Racing	Lola T700	Cosworth	197	+3 Laps	0	6
8	17	72	(United States) Chris Kneifel	Primus Racing	Primus LR03	Cosworth	196	+4 Laps	0	5
9	11	55	(Mexico) Josele Garza	Machinists Union Racing	Penske PC-10	Cosworth	195	+5 Laps	0	4
10	22	10	(United States) Tony Bettenhausen Jr.	Bettenhausen Motorsports	March 83C	Cosworth	194	+6 Laps	0	3
11	8	7	(United States) Al Unser	Penske Racing	Penske PC-11	Cosworth	191	+9 Laps	0	2
12	1	5	(United States) Tom Sneva	Bignotti-Cotter Racing	March 83C	Cosworth	153	Transmission	27	2
13	15	30	(United States) Howdy Holmes	Doug Shierson Racing	March 83C	Cosworth	153	Engine	3	0
14	20	66	(United States) Pete Halsmer	Arciero Racing	Penske PC-10	Cosworth	152	Crash	0	0
15	33	6	(United States) Kevin Cogan	Bignotti-Cotter Racing	March 83C	Cosworth	149	Gearbox	0	0
16	19	9	(United States) Roger Mears	Machinists Union Racing	Penske PC-10	Cosworth	143	Engine	0	0
17	30	35	(United States) Patrick Bedard	Brayton Racing	March 83C	Cosworth	123	Engine	0	0
18	31	86	(United States) Al Loquasto	GTS Racing	Penske PC-9B	Cosworth	115	Engine	0	0
19	5	94	(United States) Bill Whittington	Whittington Racing	March 83C	Cosworth	109	Engine mount	0	0
20	24	11	(United States) Bill Alsup	Alsup Racing	Penske PC-9C	Cosworth	109	Oil pressure	0	0
21	7	40	(United States) Johnny Rutherford	Patrick Racing	Wildcat Mk9B	Cosworth	91	Crash	0	0
22	23	19	(United States) Dick Ferguson	Rattlesnake Racing	March 81C	Cosworth	84	Handling	0	0
23	29	23	(United States) Jim McElreath	McElreath Racing	McElreath	Cosworth	84	Suspension	0	0
24	32	20	(United States) Danny Ongais	Patrick Racing	March 83C	Cosworth	70	Electrical	0	0
25	34	56	(United States) Steve Chassey	Gohr Racing	Eagle 82	Chevrolet	67	Valve	0	0
26	12	60	(United States) Chip Ganassi	Patrick Racing	Wildcat Mk9	Cosworth	56	Exhaust header	0	0
27	26	28	(United States) Gary Bettenhausen	H&R Racing	Spirit 83	Chevrolet	40	Engine	0	0
28	10	37	(United States) Scott Brayton	Brayton Racing	March 83C	Cosworth	39	Fuel leak	0	0
29	16	12	(United States) John Paul Jr.	Racing Team VDS	Penske PC-10	Cosworth	38	Crash	0	0
30	28	36	(United States) Chuck Ciprich	BC Pace Racing	Finley	Chevrolet	38	Transmission	0	0
31	18	34	(South Africa) Desiré Wilson	Wysard Motor Co.	March 83C	Cosworth	37	Crash	0	0
32	27	46	(United States) Jerry Karl	Rhoades Racing	Wildcat Mk9	Cosworth	27	Oil leak	0	0
33	21	91	(United States) Don Whittington	Whittington Racing	March 81C	Cosworth	11	Crash	0	0
34	25	8	(United States) Tom Bagley	Leader Card Racers	Watson	Cosworth	5	Fuel line	0	0

=== Race statistics ===
Lap Leaders
Laps	Leader
1–13	Tom Sneva
14–16	Howdy Holmes
17–35	Teo Fabi
36–51	Rick Mears
52–65	Tom Sneva
66–68	Al Unser Jr.
69–79	Teo Fabi
80–104	Al Unser Jr.
105–126	Teo Fabi
127–136	Rick Mears
137–200	Teo Fabi

== Broadcasting ==
The Pocono 500 was broadcast by NBC's Sportsworld. Paul Page was the lead broadcaster, joined by Gordon Johncock. Gary Gerould reported from the pits. A one-hour delayed broadcast was aired two weeks after the race on August 28.
