= 1983 Michigan 500 =

Coordinates: 42°03′58.68″N 84°14′29.18″W

(United States) 1983 Michigan 500
Race details
- Race 5 of 13 in the 1983 CART season
- Date: July 17, 1983
- Official name: 1983 Norton Michigan 500
- Location: Michigan International Speedway, Brooklyn, Michigan, United States
- Course: Permanent racing facility 2.000 mi / 3.219 km
- Distance: 250 laps 500.000 mi / 804.672 km
- Weather: Cloudy with temperatures up to 88 °F (31 °C); wind speeds reaching up to 14 miles per hour (23 km/h)

Pole position
- Driver: (Italy) Teo Fabi (Forsythe/Pettit Racing)
- Time: 202.128 mph (325.293 km/h)

Podium
- First: (United States) John Paul Jr. (VDS Racing)
- Second: (United States) Al Unser (Team Penske)
- Third: (United States) Mario Andretti (Newman-Haas Racing)

The 1983 Michigan 500, the third running of the event, was held at the Michigan International Speedway in Brooklyn, Michigan, on Sunday, July 17, 1983. Branded as the 1983 Norton Michigan 500 for sponsorship reasons, the event was race number 5 of 13 in the 1983 CART PPG Indy Car World Series. The race was won by John Paul Jr. - his first Indy Car victory - who made a last lap pass over Rick Mears.

== Background ==
By 1983, the Michigan 500 was established as the second most significant race on the Indy car schedule behind the Indianapolis 500.

On March 8, 1983, Domino's Pizza announced they would offer a one million dollar bonus to any driver who could win IndyCar's Triple Crown of 500 Mile Races: The Indianapolis 500, Michigan 500, and Pocono 500. In 1982, Gordon Johncock won Indianapolis and Michigan before breaking a gearbox while running second at Pocono. If no driver won all three races, Dominos would award a $10,000 prize to the driver that scored the most points in the three races.

Tom Sneva won the 1983 Indianapolis 500 and entered the Michigan 500 with his chances for the Triple Crown Million Dollar Bonus still intact.

At Indianapolis, Johnny Rutherford suffered broken bones in his right ankle and left foot in a practice crash. He chose to skip the Michigan 500 to further recuperate. A. J. Foyt chose to skip the Michigan 500 to prepare for the Pocono 500 and focus on his NASCAR program. Foyt suffered two major crashes in the last two years at the Michigan 500. However Foyt during the NASCAR Firecracker 400 weekend at Daytona would be involved in a bad crash that would essentially end his racing in IndyCar for 1983 due to injuries sustained. Desire Wilson suffered a broken ankle in a sports car crash which forced her to miss Michigan. Geoff Brabham served as a substitute for Wilson.

After sponsoring the event for the first two years, Norton chose to drop out of Indy car racing and drop their sponsorship of the Michigan 500.

== Practice and Time Trials ==
On Wednesday, July 13, Teo Fabi led the opening day of practice with a speed of 199.778 mph. Don Whittington was second fastest with a speed of 199.463 mph. Rick Mears was third at 199.236 mph. Kevin Cogan and Gordon Johncock rounded out the top-five. Speeds were slower than the 1982 Michigan 500 after CART banned ground-effects on race cars. Mario Andretti was unable to practice as he waited for a new Lola chassis to be delivered from England.

Thursday's qualifying session was led by Teo Fabi who backed up his pole in the Indianapolis 500 by winning the pole for the Michigan 500. The 28 year-old Italian rookie ran a speed of 202.128 mph. Don Whittington qualified second for the second consecutive year at 201.822 mph. Tom Sneva qualified on the outside of the front row at 201.506 mph.

Friday's final day of qualifying was led by Tom Bigelow with a speed of 190.683 mph. Five additional cars filled the field.

== Race ==
The start of the race was delayed two hours by severe thunderstorms, with a tornado touching down five miles from the track. A 64-year-old woman suffered a severe heart attack and died while exiting the grandstands during the storm. Eight additional spectators were injured when the storm blew a wooden sun canopy for an NBC television camera off the roof of the main grandstands. Four were hospitalized and four were treated at the track. Those hospitalized were released later that night.

The CEO of Domino's Pizza, Tom Monaghan was Grand marshal for the race and gave the command to start engines.

Teo Fabi led the field into turn one but was passed by Don Whittington on the outside and Gordon Johncock on the inside in turn two. Tom Sneva passed Fabi on the backstretch to drop the polesitter to fourth. Whittington led the first lap by inches over Johncock. Entering turn one on lap two, Sneva made it three wide and passed both cars to take the lead. Johncock repassed Sneva entering turn one on lap three and led the next seven laps. The first caution came out when Tom Bigelow's car started smoking.

The second caution came out on lap 19 when Howdy Holmes lost a right front wheel and impacted the turn one wall with the right side of his car.

Gordon Johncock led 35 of the first 73 laps but crashed while running second on lap 75 when his left-rear CV joint broke in turn three. Third-place Kevin Cogan was unable to avoid the spinning Johncock and both cars hit the wall. Patrick Bedard spun in avoidance and was clipped by Tom Sneva. Sneva's chances for the one million dollar triple crown bonus ended when he retired due to a broken suspension. Johncock was hospitalized with a badly broken right ankle, broken left foot, and broken right kneecap. He underwent surgery later that afternoon at Foote Memorial Hospital.

On lap 126, Al Unser Jr. ran out of fuel while leading and stopped on the backstretch. Unser lost two laps while he was towed back to the pits.

Mears pitted for the final time on lap 197 and attempted to stretch his fuel for the final 53 laps.

With 12 laps remaining, Mears passed Unser for the lead. John Paul Jr. passed Unser two laps later for second.

As the cars entered the last lap, Mears held a slim lead over Paul. As Mears exited turn two he caught the lapped car of Chris Kneifel and was slowed. Paul passed Mears entering turn three with a very shallow entry into the corner. Mears pulled in behind Paul but lost control in turn three, spun 360 degrees and hit the outside wall. Kneifel lost control and drove directly into Mears's car. Paul drove to the finish and earned $104,467 for the victory. It was only his fourth Indy car start. 12 cautions slowed the race with 85 of the 250 laps were run behind the pace car. Only 12 of the 33 started were running at the finish.

Paul Jr. was unaware that he was the race winner until he returned to pit road. "I thought (Little Al) was leading the race. He was a little ahead of me in the rookie standings, so I was really just going for position. I was just going to pull into the pits, but they told me to go to the winner's circle. I didn't really know what was going on."

Mears was hospitalized overnight with a possible concussion. Kneifel was taken to the hospital for observation of leg injuries but released that night.

== Box score ==
Finish	Grid	No	Name	Entrant	Chassis	Engine	Laps	Time/Status	Led	Points
1	9	12	(United States) John Paul Jr.	Racing Team VDS	Penske PC-10	Cosworth	250	3:42:27.000	66	21
2	7	7	(United States) Al Unser	Penske Racing	Penske PC-11	Cosworth	250	+15.000	33	16
3	18	3	(United States) Mario Andretti	Newman/Haas Racing	Lola T700	Cosworth	250	+20.000	21	14
4	8	1	(United States) Rick Mears	Penske Racing	Penske PC-11	Cosworth	249	Crash	19	12
5	4	2	(United States) Bobby Rahal	Truesports	March 83C	Cosworth	249	+1 Lap	38	10
6	6	21	(United States) Pancho Carter	Alex Morales Motorsports	March 82C	Cosworth	248	+2 Laps	2	8
7	15	17	(United States) Al Unser Jr.	Galles Racing	Eagle 83	Cosworth	248	+2 Laps	19	6
8	12	60	(United States) Chip Ganassi	Patrick Racing	Wildcat Mk9	Cosworth	247	+3 Laps	0	5
9	19	72	(United States) Chris Kneifel	Primus Racing	Primus LR03	Cosworth	242	Crash	0	4
10	24	56	(United States) Steve Chassey	Gohr Racing	Eagle 82	Chevrolet	241	+9 Laps	0	3
11	29	86	(United States) Dick Ferguson	Hoffman Racing	March 81C	Cosworth	235	+15 Laps	0	2
12	17	37	(United States) Scott Brayton	Brayton Racing	March 83C	Cosworth	235	+15 Laps	0	1
13	33	23	(United States) Jim McElreath	McElreath Racing	McElreath	Cosworth	231	+19 Laps	0	0
14	20	22	(United States) Dick Simon	Dick Simon Racing	March 83C	Cosworth	215	+35 Laps	0	0
15	1	33	(Italy) Teo Fabi	Forsythe Racing	March 83C	Cosworth	205	Clutch	3	1
16	27	11	(United States) Bill Alsup	Alsup Racing	Argo JM15	Cosworth	204	Crash	0	0
17	10	18	(United States) Mike Mosley	Kraco Racing	March 83C	Cosworth	196	Engine	0	0
18	21	10	(United States) Tony Bettenhausen Jr.	Bettenhausen Motorsports	March 83C	Cosworth	174	Engine	0	0
19	22	55	(Mexico) Josele Garza	Machinists Union Racing	Penske PC-10	Cosworth	159	Gearbox	0	0
20	2	91	(United States) Don Whittington	Whittington Racing	March 81C	Cosworth	156	Engine	5	0
21	31	61	(United States) Jerry Karl	Rhoades Racing	Wildcat Mk9	Cosworth	149	Transmission	0	0
22	23	34	(Australia) Geoff Brabham	Wysard Motor Co.	March 83C	Cosworth	127	Radiator	0	0
23	14	40	(United States) Danny Ongais	Patrick Racing	March 83C	Cosworth	124	CV joint	0	0
24	32	42	(United States) Herm Johnson	Herm Johnson	March 82C	Cosworth	106	Oil leak	0	0
25	3	5	(United States) Tom Sneva	Bignotti-Cotter Racing	March 83C	Cosworth	75	Tie rod	9	0
26	5	20	(United States) Gordon Johncock	Patrick Racing	March 83C	Cosworth	74	Crash	35	0
27	11	6	(United States) Kevin Cogan	Bignotti-Cotter Racing	March 83C	Cosworth	74	Crash	0	0
28	13	35	(United States) Patrick Bedard	Brayton Racing	March 83C	Cosworth	73	Radiator	0	0
29	28	78	(United States) Tom Bigelow	HBK Racing	Eagle 82	Chevrolet	64	Engine	0	0
30	30	8	(United States) Johnny Parsons	Leader Card Racers	Watson	Cosworth	56	Magneto	0	0
31	25	19	(United States) Mike Chandler	Rattlesnake Racing	Rattlesnake 82	Cosworth	47	Engine	0	0
32	26	30	(United States) Howdy Holmes	Doug Shierson Racing	March 83C	Cosworth	18	Crash	0	0
33	16	66	(United States) Pete Halsmer	Arciero Racing	Penske PC-10	Cosworth	11	Engine	0	0

=== Race statistics ===
Lap Leaders
Laps	Leader
1	Don Whittington
2	Tom Sneva
3–9	Gordon Johncock
10–17	Tom Sneva
18–19	Don Whittington
20–31	Bobby Rahal
32–34	Al Unser Jr.
35–42	Bobby Rahal
43	Al Unser Jr.
44–50	Gordon Johncock
51–52	Pancho Carter
53–73	Gordon Johncock
74–76	Teo Fabi
77–87	Al Unser
88–89	Don Whittington
90–93	Bobby Rahal
94–96	Rick Mears
97–110	Bobby Rahal
111–125	Al Unser Jr.
126–146	Mario Andretti
147–192	John Paul Jr.
193–197	Rick Mears
198–216	John Paul Jr.
217–238	Al Unser
239–249	Rick Mears
250	John Paul Jr.

== Broadcasting ==
The Michigan 500 was broadcast on television by NBC. Paul Page was the lead announcer and was joined by Johnny Rutherford and Bobby Unser as color commentators. Gary Gerould and Bruce Jenner served as pit reporters.

The radio broadcast was anchored by Chris McClure with Desire Wilson providing color commentary. Gary Lee, Bill Hennecy, and Jerry Gappens reported from pit road.
