= 1983 CART PPG Indy Car World Series =

American motorsport season

1983 CART season
- PPG Indy Car World Series

Season
- Races: 13
- Start date: April 17
- End date: October 29

Awards
- Drivers' champion: (United States) Al Unser
- Constructors' Cup: (United Kingdom) March
- Manufacturers' Cup: (United Kingdom) Cosworth
- Nations' Cup: United States
- Rookie of the Year: (Italy) Teo Fabi
- Indianapolis 500 winner: (United States) Tom Sneva

The 1983 CART PPG Indy Car World Series season was the 5th national championship season of American open wheel racing sanctioned by CART. The season consisted of 13 races. Al Unser was the national champion, and the rookie of the year was Teo Fabi. The 1983 Indianapolis 500 was sanctioned by USAC, but an arrangement was made such that it counted towards the CART points championship. Tom Sneva won the Indy 500, after three previous runner-up finishes.

Al Unser jumped out to the early points lead, with second-place finishes in the first three races of the season. Unser finished second at Indianapolis to Tom Sneva, but not without some controversy. Rookie Al Unser Jr. was accused of blocking for his father, but Sneva prevailed, making the winning pass with ten laps to go. Unser won at Cleveland, finished second at the Michigan 500, and third at Road America. After 6 of 13 races, Unser had a 35-point lead over Tom Sneva in the standings.

Rookie Teo Fabi made headlines at Indianapolis, becoming the first rookie to win the pole since 1950. His car dropped out, however, with a failed fuel o-ring. After a mixed start to the year, Fabi's season came alive in July, winning his first career race at the Pocono 500. Fabi jumped from 8th in points to as high as second following his win at Mid-Ohio. Fabi began to whittle away at Unser's point lead. Unser was running consistently, and had no finish worse than 11th.

In the next-to-last race of the season at Laguna Seca, Fabi dominated. He won the pole position and led 95 of 98 laps, winning his third race of the season. With only one race to go, Unser's point lead was down to 15 points. At the season finale in Phoenix, Fabi put in another dominating performance. He won the pole and led 138 of 150 laps. Fabi's championship hopes, however, fell just short as Al Unser came home 4th. Al Unser won the title by a mere 5 points over Fabi.

Other top stories from 1983 included Newman/Haas Racing joining the series with driver Mario Andretti plus a new chassis from Lola, and the rookie debut of Al Unser Jr. Though Unser Jr. did not win any races, he had ten top-10 finishes en route to 7th in points.

== Drivers and constructors ==
The following teams and drivers competed in the 1983 CART World Series. All competitors utilized Goodyear tires.

Team/Car Owner	No	Drivers	Rounds
Alex Morales Motorsports	21	(United States) Pancho Carter	All
All American Racers	98	(United States) Jeff Wood	11-12
Alsup Racing	11	(United States) Bill Alsup	1, 3-5, 7, 9-10, 12-13
Arciero Racing	66	(United States) Pete Halsmer	1, 3-13
Arciero Racing	66	(United States) Johnny Parsons	2
Armstrong Mould Racing Team	43	(United States) Steve Krisiloff	2
BC Pace Racing	36	(United States) Chuck Ciprich	7
Bettenhausen Racing	10	(United States) Tony Bettenhausen Jr.	All
Bettenhausen Racing	82	(United States) Gary Bettenhausen	13
Bettenhausen Racing	90	(Republic of Ireland) Derek Daly	6, 9, 11-13
Bignotti-Cotter Racing	5	(United States) Tom Sneva	All
Bignotti-Cotter Racing	6	(United States) Kevin Cogan	1, 3-13
Bignotti-Cotter Racing	16	(United States) Kevin Cogan	2
Bob Ward Racing	47	(United States) Bob Ward	8
Brayton Racing	35	(United States) Patrick Bedard	2, 5, 7
Brayton Racing	37	(United States) Scott Brayton	2, 4-5, 7, 10-11
Circle Bar Auto Racing	38	(United States) Chet Fillip	1-2, 10
Circle Bar Auto Racing w/ Caliva Racing	38	(United States) Phil Caliva	8
Dick Simon Racing	32	(United States) Dick Simon	6
Dick Simon Racing	22	(United States) Dick Simon	1-3, 5, 8-11, 13
Dick Simon Racing	22	(Peru) Jorge Koechlin	12
Doug Shierson Racing	30	(United States) Howdy Holmes	All
Douglas Schulz	48	(United States) Tom Klausler	6, 8
Forsythe Racing	33	(Italy) Teo Fabi	All
Galles Racing	17	(United States) Al Unser Jr.	1, 3-13
Galles Racing	19	(United States) Al Unser Jr.	2
Gilmore Racing	1	(United States) George Snider	2
Gilmore Racing	14	(United States) A. J. Foyt	2
Gohr Racing	56	(United States) Steve Chassey	1-8, 11-13
GTS Racing	86	(United States) Drake Olson	6
GTS Racing	86	(United States) Al Loquasto	7
H&R Racing	28	(United States) Gary Bettenhausen	3, 7, 9
H&R Racing	28	(United States) Herm Johnson	9
HBK Racing	70	(United States) Tom Bigelow	3
HBK Racing	78	(United States) Tom Bigelow	5
Herm Johnson Racing	42	(United States) Herm Johnson	4-5
Hoffman Racing	86	(United States) Dick Ferguson	5
Intercomp Racing	92	(United States) John Mahler	2
Interscope Racing	25	(United States) Danny Ongais	2
Jet Engineering	64	(United States) Greg Leffler	6, 8-9
Jet Engineering	64	(United States) Tom Bigelow	12
Joel McCray Racing	46	(United States) Phil Krueger	1, 3-4, 9
Kraco Enterprises	18	(United States) Mike Mosley	1-8, 10, 13
Kraco Enterprises	18	(Australia) Geoff Brabham	11-12
Kraco Enterprises	99	(Australia) Geoff Brabham	8, 10
Kraco Enterprises	99	(United States) Michael Andretti	11-13
Leader Card Racers	8	(United States) Johnny Parsons	5
Leader Card Racers	8	(United States) Tom Bagley	7
Leader Card Racers	8	(United States) Randy Lewis	12
Leader Card Racers	24	(United States) Chip Mead	9-10
Machinists Union Racing	9	(United States) Roger Mears	1-4, 6-13
Machinists Union Racing	55	(Mexico) Josele Garza	2, 4-12
McElreath Racing	23	(United States) Jim McElreath	1, 5, 7
Newman/Haas Racing	3	(United States) Mario Andretti	All
Patrick Racing	40	(United States) Johnny Rutherford	1, 7, 10-11, 13
Patrick Racing	40	(United States) Danny Ongais	4-6
Patrick Racing	60	(United States) Danny Ongais	3
Patrick Racing	20	(United States) Danny Ongais	7-9
Patrick Racing	60	(United States) Chip Ganassi	2, 4-5, 7, 9-13
Patrick Racing	20	(United States) Chip Ganassi	6
Patrick Racing	20	(United States) Gordon Johncock	1-5
Primus Racing	72	(United States) Chris Kneifel	2, 4-13
Racing Team VDS	12	(United States) John Paul Jr.	1, 4-13
Racing Team VDS	12	(Australia) Geoff Brabham	2
Rattlesnake Racing w/ Agajanian Curb	29	(United States) Mike Chandler	2
Rattlesnake Racing w/ Agajanian Curb	19	(United States) Mike Chandler	5
Rattlesnake Racing w/ Agajanian Curb	19	(United States) Dick Ferguson	7
Rhoades Racing	41	(United States) Doug Heveron	1
Rhoades Racing	46	(United States) Jerry Karl	7-8
Rhoades Racing	61	(United States) Jerry Karl	3, 5
Simpson Sports	90	(Australia) Dennis Firestone	2
Team Penske	1	(United States) Rick Mears	1, 3-13
Team Penske	2	(United States) Rick Mears	2
Team Penske	7	(United States) Al Unser	All
Tempero Racing	15	(United States) Bill Tempero	4, 9
Truesports	2	(United States) Bobby Rahal	1, 3-12
Truesports	4	(United States) Bobby Rahal	2
Whittington Racing	91	(United States) Don Whittington	2, 5, 7
Whittington Racing	94	(United States) Bill Whittington	2, 4, 7
Wysard Racing	34	(Republic of Ireland) Derek Daly	1-2
Wysard Racing	34	(South Africa) Desiré Wilson	3, 6-9, 11-13
Wysard Racing	34	(Australia) Geoff Brabham	5

== Schedule ==
Logo of the series for this year

Of the notable changes to the schedule, there were the additions of the Caesars Palace Grand Prix, which was formerly a Formula One championship event, and Laguna Seca Raceway. The Mid-Ohio Sports Car Course in Lexington, Ohio returned to the schedule after a 2 year hiatus, and finally starting this season there would only be one race per season at the Milwaukee Mile.

Icon	Legend
O	Oval/Speedway
R	Road course
S	Street circuit
C	Cancelled race

Rd	Date	Name	Circuit	Location
C	March 20*	(United States) Kraco Car Stereo 150	O Phoenix International Raceway	Avondale, Arizona
1	April 17	(United States) Kraco Dixie 200	O Atlanta Motor Speedway	Hampton, Georgia
2	May 29	(United States) Indianapolis 500	O Indianapolis Motor Speedway	Indianapolis, Indiana
3	June 12	(United States) Gould Rex Mays Classic	O Milwaukee Mile	West Allis, Wisconsin
4	July 3	(United States) Budweiser Cleveland 500	S Burke Lakefront Airport	Cleveland, Ohio
5	July 17	(United States) Norton Michigan 500	O Michigan International Speedway	Brooklyn, Michigan
6	July 31	(United States) Provimi Veal 200	R Road America	Elkhart Lake, Wisconsin
7	August 14	(United States) Domino's Pizza 500	O Pocono International Raceway	Long Pond, Pennsylvania
8	August 29**	(United States) Budweiser 500K	R Riverside International Raceway	Riverside, California
9	September 11	(United States) Escort Radar Warning 200	R Mid-Ohio Sports Car Course	Lexington, Ohio
10	September 26	(United States) Detroit News Grand Prix	O Michigan International Speedway	Brooklyn, Michigan
11	October 8	(United States) Caesars Palace Grand Prix	S Caesars Palace	Las Vegas, Nevada
12	October 23	(United States) Cribari Wines 300k	R Laguna Seca Raceway	Monterey, California
13	October 29	(United States) Miller High Life 150	O Phoenix International Raceway	Avondale, Arizona

* The season-opening Phoenix race was cancelled due to flooding.

** The Riverside race was scheduled for August 28, but pushed a day due to rain.

== Results ==
Rd	Race name	Pole position	Pole time	Winning driver	Winning team	Race time	Report
1	Kraco Dixie 200	(United States) Rick Mears	26.730	(United States) Gordon Johncock	Patrick Racing	1:22:29	Report
2	Indianapolis 500	(Italy) Teo Fabi	2:53.582	(United States) Tom Sneva	Bignotti-Cotter Racing	3:05:03	Report
3	Gould Rex Mays Classic	(Italy) Teo Fabi	26.259	(United States) Tom Sneva	Bignotti-Cotter Racing	1:17:42	Report
4	Budweiser Cleveland 500	(United States) Mario Andretti	1:13.516	(United States) Al Unser	Penske Racing	2:51:54	Report
5	Norton Michigan 500	(Italy) Teo Fabi	35.621	(United States) John Paul Jr.	VDS Racing	3:42:27	Report
6	Provimi Veal 200	(United States) Mario Andretti	1:58.898	(United States) Mario Andretti	Newman/Haas Racing	2:00:42	Report
7	Domino's Pizza 500	(United States) Tom Sneva	46.912	(Italy) Teo Fabi	Forsythe Racing	3:42:28	Report
8	Budweiser 500K	(Italy) Teo Fabi	1:30.887	(United States) Bobby Rahal	Truesports	2:45:28	Report
9	Escort Radar Warning 200	(United States) Bobby Rahal	1:21.364	(Italy) Teo Fabi	Forsythe Racing	2:01:49	Report
10	Detroit News Grand Prix	(United States) Bobby Rahal	35.075	(United States) Rick Mears	Penske Racing	1:05:49	Report
11	Caesars Palace Grand Prix	(United States) John Paul Jr.	34.888	(United States) Mario Andretti	Newman/Haas Racing	2:17:48	Report
12	Cribari Wines 300k	(Italy) Teo Fabi	56.920	(Italy) Teo Fabi	Forsythe Racing	1:44:28	Report
13	Miller High Life 150	(Italy) Teo Fabi	24.947	(Italy) Teo Fabi	Forsythe Racing	1:11:03	Report

* Indianapolis was USAC-sanctioned but counted towards the CART title.

=== Final points standings ===
Pos	Driver	ATL (United States)	INDY (United States)	MIL (United States)	CLE (United States)	MIS1 (United States)	ROA (United States)	POC (United States)	RIV (United States)	MOH (United States)	MIS2 (United States)	CPL (United States)	LAG (United States)	PHX (United States)	Pts
1	(United States) Al Unser	2	2	2	1*	2	3	11	11	4	5	4	11	4	151
2	(Italy) Teo Fabi RY	20	**26**	**4**	3	**15**	15	1*	**2**	1*	3	25	**1***	**1***	146
3	(United States) Mario Andretti	5	23	18	**15**	3	**1**	7	16	2	4	1*	2	2	133
4	(United States) Tom Sneva	14	1*	1*	5	25	4	**12**	5	7	21	15	18	3	96
5	(United States) Bobby Rahal	21	20	6	19	5	10*	5	1	**3**	**2**	9	7	DNS	94
6	(United States) Rick Mears	**8***	3	3	7	4	17	3	19	9	1*	13	21	17	92
7	(United States) Al Unser Jr. R	6	10	13	9	7	2	2	4*	18	10	10	4	8	89
8	(United States) John Paul Jr. R	3	Wth		21	1*	5	29	3	20	7	**2**	26	11	84
9	(United States) Chip Ganassi		8		13	8	21	26		25	6	3	3	5	56
10	(United States) Pancho Carter	16	7	14	8	6	7	6	7	10	15	6	25	10	53
11	(United States) Pete Halsmer	4	Wth	9	2	33	14	14	27	24	14	5	20	7	48
12	(United States) Roger Mears	7	28	8	6	Wth	8	16	9	12	16	7	6	16	43
13	(United States) Howdy Holmes	9	6	7	12	32	16	13	13	8	8	17	5	21	39
14	(United States) Mike Mosley	13	13	5	4	17	25	4	24	DNS	11			24	36
15	(United States) Kevin Cogan	15	5	20	25	27	19	15	21	6	20	16	22	6	26
16	(United States) Gordon Johncock	1	14	23	26	26									20
17	(United States) Chris Kneifel R		12		27	9	26	8	22	13	24	8	9	15	19
18	(United States) Tony Bettenhausen Jr.	10	17	10	18	18	12	10	8	14	9	21	14	18	19
19	(United States) Steve Chassey	17	11	19	22	10	6	25	17			12	10	19	17
20	(United States) Danny Ongais		21	12	28	23	18	24	10	5					14
21	(Australia) Geoff Brabham		4			22			18		12	20	16		13
22	(Mexico) Josele Garza		25		17	19	11	9	20	23	17	11	12		9
23	(United States) Tom Klausler R						22		6			DNQ			8
24	(United States) Jeff Wood R											22	8		5
25	(United States) Scott Brayton		9		24	12		28			13	26			5
26	(Republic of Ireland) Derek Daly R	22	19	Wth			9			22		18	23	22	4
27	(United States) Michael Andretti R											19	24	9	4
28	(South Africa) Desiré Wilson R		Wth		10		20	31	14	16		23	19	13	3
29	(United States) Dick Simon	DNQ	15	11	DNQ	14	13	Wth	25	15	19	14	DNQ	23	2
30	(United States) Jim McElreath	11				13		23							2
31	(United States) Greg Leffler		DNQ	Wth	DNQ	Wth	24		15	11					2
32	(United States) Phil Krueger	DNQ	DNQ	17	11	DNQ				27					2
33	(United States) Dick Ferguson		DNQ			11		22							2
34	(United States) Jerry Karl		DNQ	16	DNQ	21		32	12	DNQ					1
35	(United States) Gary Bettenhausen		DNQ	22		DNQ		27		Wth				12	1
36	(United States) Doug Heveron R	12	Wth												1
37	(United States) Randy Lewis R												13		0
38	(United States) Bill Alsup	Wth	DNQ	21	20	16		20		19	22	DNQ	27	14	0
39	(United States) Tom Bigelow		DNQ	15	DNQ	29							17	DNQ	0
40	(United States) Bill Whittington R		18		15			19							0
41	(Peru) Jorge Koechlin R												15		0
42	(United States) Herm Johnson		DNQ		16	24	DNQ			17					0
43	(United States) Mike Chandler		16			31									0
44	(United States) Patrick Bedard R		30			28		17							0
45	(United States) Chet Fillip R	19	33							DNQ	18				0
46	(United States) Johnny Rutherford	18	Wth					21			23	24	DNQ	20	0
47	(United States) Al Loquasto		DNQ					18							0
48	(United States) Don Whittington		27			20		33							0
49	(United States) Bill Tempero		DNQ		23		DNQ			21			DNQ		0
50	(United States) Johnny Parsons		22			30									0
51	(United States) Phil Caliva		DNQ						23				DNQ		0
52	(United States) Drake Olson R				DNQ		23								0
53	(Australia) Dennis Firestone		24												0
54	(United States) Chip Mead									26	25				0
55	(United States) Bob Ward R								26			DNQ		DNQ	0
56	(United States) Steve Krisiloff		29												0
57	(United States) Chuck Ciprich R		Wth			Wth		30							0
58	(United States) A. J. Foyt		31												0
59	(United States) George Snider		32												0
60	(United States) Tom Bagley				DNQ			34							0
–	(United States) Richard Hubbard				DNQ		DNQ			DNQ			DNQ		0
–	(United States) Barry Ruble				DNQ		DNQ								0
–	(United States) Bill Henderson											DNQ	DNQ		0
–	(Canada) Harry MacDonald		Wth		DNQ										0
–	(United States) Jim Buick		Wth			DNQ									0
–	(United States) Larry Cannon		DNQ												0
–	(United States) Spike Gehlhausen		DNQ												0
–	(United States) John Mahler		DNQ												0
–	(United States) Roger Rager		DNQ												0
–	(United States) Rich Vogler		DNQ												0
–	(United States) Brad Murphey									DNQ					0
–	(United States) Mark Alderson		Wth												0
–	(United States) Bob Harkey		Wth												0
–	(United States) Sheldon Kinser		Wth												0
–	(United States) Mack McClellan		Wth												0
–	(United States) Ken Schrader		Wth												0
–	(United States) Jerry Sneva		Wth												0
Pos	Driver	ATL (United States)	INDY (United States)	MIL (United States)	CLE (United States)	MIS1 (United States)	ROA (United States)	POC (United States)	RIV (United States)	MOH (United States)	MIS2 (United States)	CPL (United States)	LAG (United States)	PHX (United States)	Pts

Color	Result
Gold	Winner
Silver	2nd place
Bronze	3rd place
Green	4th-6th place
Light Blue	7th-12th place
Dark Blue	Finished (Outside Top 12)
Purple	Did not finish
Red	Did not qualify (DNQ)
Brown	Withdrawn (Wth)
Black	Disqualified (DSQ)
White	Did not start (DNS)
Blank	Did not participate (DNP)
Blank	Not competing

**In-line notation**
**Bold**	Pole position
Italics	Ran fastest race lap
*	Led most race laps
RY	Rookie of the Year
R	Rookie

–

== See also ==
- 1982–83 USAC Championship Car season
- 1983 Formula Atlantic season
- 1983 Indianapolis 500
- 1983–84 USAC Championship Car season
- http://www.champcarstats.com/year/1983.htm
- http://media.indycar.com/pdf/2011/IICS_2011_Historical_Record_Book_INT6.pdf (p. 193–194)
