= 1983 Indianapolis 500 =

American motor race

67th Indianapolis 500
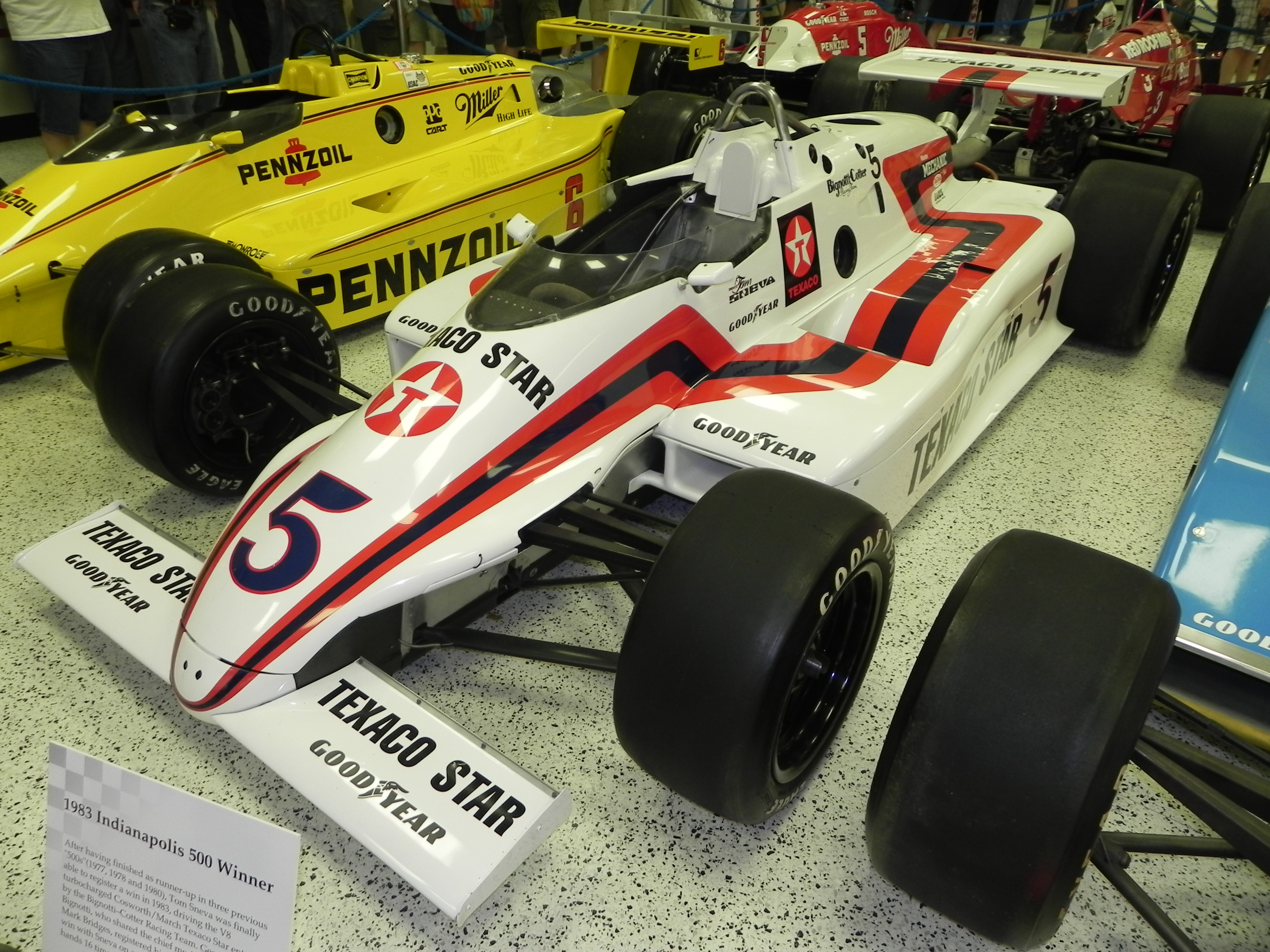

Indianapolis Motor Speedway

Indianapolis 500
- Sanctioning body: USAC
- Season: 1983 CART season 1982-83 Gold Crown
- Date: May 29, 1983
- Winner: (United States) Tom Sneva
- Winning team: Bignotti-Cotter Racing
- Winning Chief Mechanic: George Bignotti
- Time of race: 3:05:03.066
- Average speed: 162.117 mph (260.902 km/h)
- Pole position: (Italy) Teo Fabi
- Pole speed: 207.395 mph (333.770 km/h)
- Fastest qualifier: (Italy) Teo Fabi
- Rookie of the Year: (Italy) Teo Fabi
- Most laps led: (United States) Tom Sneva (98)

Pre-race ceremonies
- National anthem: James A. Hubert
- "Back Home Again in Indiana": Jim Nabors
- Starting command: Mary F. Hulman
- Pace car: Buick Riviera
- Pace car driver: Duke Nalon
- Starter: Duane Sweeney
- Estimated attendance: 325,000

Television in the United States
- Network: ABC
- Announcers: Host: Jackie Stewart; Lap-by-lap: Jim McKay; Color analyst: Sam Posey
- Nielsen ratings: 14.1 / 27

Chronology
Previous	Next
1982	1984

The 67th Indianapolis 500 was held at the Indianapolis Motor Speedway in Speedway, Indiana, on Sunday, May 29, 1983. After finishing second three times (1977, 1978, 1980), winning the pole position twice (1977–1978), and being the fastest qualifier one additional time (1981), Tom Sneva finally shook his "bridesmaid" status and won his first and only Indianapolis 500. The win also represented the record seventh Indy victory with which chief mechanic George Bignotti was involved.

In the final twenty laps, three-time winner Al Unser Sr. was leading Tom Sneva. Unser was seeking his record-tying fourth Indy victory. His son, rookie Al Unser Jr., was several laps down, but was positioned right behind his father. Al Jr. created a firestorm of controversy when it appeared that he was blocking Sneva intentionally to aid his father. Unser Jr. admitted to running interference for his father, claiming he was trying to create "dirty air" and turbulence for Sneva. He stopped short, however, of calling it "blocking". After several anxious laps, Sneva finally slipped by both Al Jr. and Al Sr., using heavy traffic to his advantage. Sneva opened up an 11-second lead, and took the checkered flag for his long-awaited Indy victory.

Rookie Teo Fabi headlined time trials by winning the pole position, and on race day he led the first 23 laps. Fabi's day was short, however, as he dropped out with a bad fuel gasket. The effort earned him the rookie of the year award. Fabi would go on to win four races during the season and finished second to Al Unser Sr. for the CART points championship.

The 1983 Indy 500 ushered in a new era of civility and stability in the sport of Indy car racing. After four years of conflict and organizational disputes between USAC and CART, the two sanctioning bodies came to an amicable truce. The Indianapolis 500 would be sanctioned singly by USAC, and officially would be part of the ceremonial Gold Crown championship. However, the race was now recognized on the CART schedule, and counted towards the 1983 CART PPG Indy Car World Series points championship. The field for the Indy 500 going forward would consist primarily of CART-based teams, along with numerous one-off ("Indy-only") entries. Despite various squabbles and minor technical differences between the sanctioning bodies, this arrangement would remain in place, with relative harmony, through 1995.

== Background ==
The USAC technical committee issued rule changes for 1983, scaling back side skirts and declaring that "all bodywork or aerodynamic devices must be at least one inch above the bottom of the car's tub." During time trials, a total of 15 cars in the qualifying line would fail pre-qualifying technical inspection, raising tempers and drawing the ire of competitors. Some teams charged that USAC was inconsistent in their enforcement and their measuring, since they used a different (and possibly less-accurate) tool than the CART series officials utilized at other races. Some teams claimed the first several cars in line were not scrutinized as heavily as those deeper in line. In addition, turbocharger "boost" settings were reduced to 47 inHg, down from 48 in 1982.

The evolving aerodynamic rules coincided with the emergence of the Robin Herd-designed March chassis becoming the vehicle of choice for the mid-1980s. The March had debuted at Indy in 1981 with the 81C, followed up by the 82C in 1982. Coupled with the widely used Cosworth DFX engine, the "customer car" era began to dominate the sport of Indy car racing. Penske, among other teams, elected to scale back, or even abandon their in-house chassis programs in favor of the English-built March for the next few seasons. The March's aerodynamic advancements, downforce, and affordable cost were among the reasons it emerged as the favorite among the competitors. The "customer car" era also was popular with the smaller-budget teams, as it allowed them access to top equipment, leveling the playing field, and shrinking the differences between haves and the have-nots. March rolled out their new 83C and with a few teams still running the 81C and 82C, March took 18 of the 33 starting positions, including the pole position during time trials. On race day, March notched their first "500" win, and placed five cars in the top nine. The 1983 race would be the first of five consecutive Indy 500 victories for March Engineering.

== Race schedule ==
Race schedule — April 1983
Sun	Mon	Tue	Wed	Thu	Fri	Sat
10	11	12; ROP	13	14	15	16
Race schedule — May 1983
1	2	3	4	5	6	7 Practice
8 Practice	9 Practice	10; Practice	11; Practice	12; Practice	13; Practice	14; Time Trials
15; Time Trials	16; Practice	17; Practice	18; Practice	19; Practice	20; Practice	21; Time Trials
22; Bump Day	23	24	25	26; Carb Day	27; Mini-Marathon	28; Parade
29; Indy 500	30; Memorial Day	31				

Color	Notes
Green	Practice
Dark Blue	Time trials
Silver	Race day
Red	Rained out*
Blank	No track activity

* Includes days where track
activity was significantly
limited due to rain

ROP — denotes Rookie
Orientation Program

== Time trials ==
Pole day time trials was scheduled for Saturday May 14. Rain, however, kept cars off the track nearly all day. At 4:15 p.m., the track finally opened for practice, but it was brief and interrupted by several yellow lights. Officials closed the track at 5:49 p.m., without a single car making a qualifying attempt. On Sunday May 15, rain washed out the entire day. It was the first time since 1978 that not a single car qualified on the first weekend. Pole day time trials was moved to the second weekend, with the USAC rule stating once the cars made one rotation around the qualifying draw, "pole qualifying" ends and third day qualifying begins.

Three-time winner Johnny Rutherford was sidelined after two major crashes. On May 8, he crashed in turn one, suffering minor injuries. On May 18, he suffered a more serious crash in turn 3. He broke his left foot and left ankle, and was forced to sit out the 1983 race.

With new ground effect rules in place, speeds were slightly down during practice compared to 1982. Since the first weekend of qualifying was rained out, drivers essentially had two weeks of practice before the run for the pole. Danny Ongais set the fastest practice lap on Friday May 20 at 205.996 mph. Don Whittington, Rick Mears, and Mike Mosley all registered laps over 205 mph. Tom Sneva was close behind at 203.896 mph, and rookie Teo Fabi had turned a lap of 202.481 mph.

=== Pole Day – Saturday May 21 ===
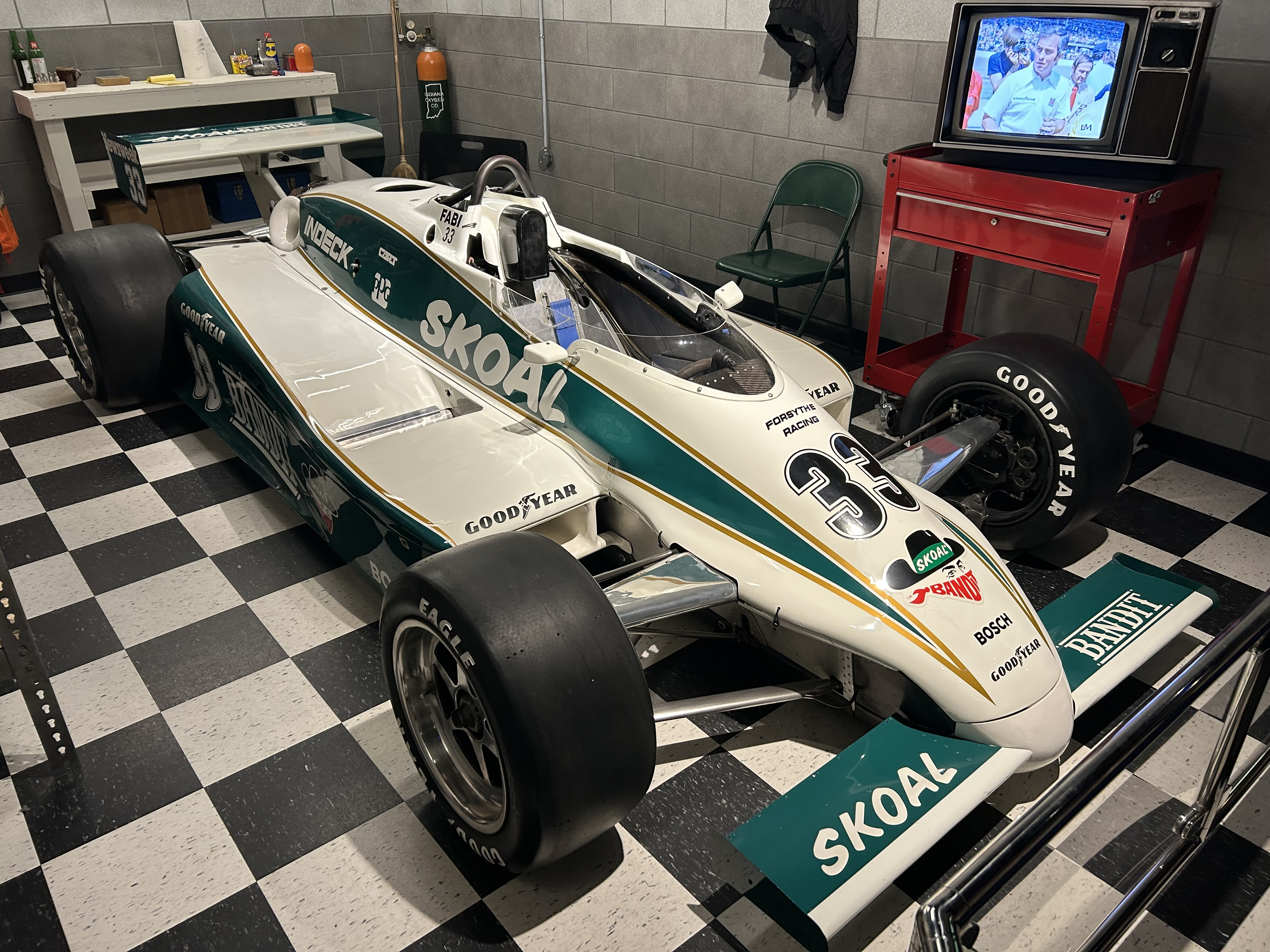
Teo Fabi's pole-winning Forsythe Racing March 83C

Pole day started with Mike Mosley (205.372 mph) taking the top spot early on. Rick Mears, a favorite for the pole position, had his effort fall short, and he completed his qualifying attempt at 204.301 mph. Tom Sneva was the next driver with a legitimate shot at the front row, but his speed of 203.687 mph was only third-fastest at the moment.

The next car out was rookie Teo Fabi, who had raised eyebrows during the week, posting practice speeds near the top of the speed chart. Fabi set a new one-lap track record of 208.049 mph, and set a four-lap record of 207.395 mph, securing the pole position. Fabi became the first rookie to win the pole since Walt Faulkner in 1950.

A very busy day saw 42 attempts and 33 cars complete qualifying runs. For the first time in modern history, the field was filled to 33 cars in one day.

On a sad note, Tony Foyt Sr., the father of A. J. Foyt as well as his former chief mechanic, died after battling lung cancer. After qualifying on Saturday, A. J. Foyt flew to Houston to visit his ailing father. At 8 o'clock, Tony Foyt Sr. lapsed into a coma, and died at 10 p.m.

=== Bump Day – Sunday May 22 ===
The day opened with John Mahler (180.022 mph) on the bubble. Rain again hampered time trials, and the track did not open until nearly 2 p.m.

Phil Krueger wrecked during a practice run. Then Gary Bettenhausen waved off a run after one lap over 193 mph, a move that would cost him the chance to make the race later.

At 4:14 p.m., Dennis Firestone completed a run of 190.888 mph, with heavy rain beginning to fall on his last lap, bumping Mahler, and the track was soaked and closed for the day. The 6 o'clock gun fired with several drivers, including Bettenhausen, Bill Alsup, and Dick Ferguson all left sitting in line.

== Carburetion Day ==
The final practice was held Thursday May 26. All 33 qualified cars took laps. Polesitter Teo Fabi (201.795 mph) was the fastest driver of the day. No incidents were reported, though Don Whittington managed only one lap due to mechanical problems.

=== Pit Stop Contest ===
The eliminations rounds for the 7th annual Miller High Life Pit Stop Contest were held on Thursday May 26. The top four race qualifiers and their respective pit crews were automatically eligible: Teo Fabi, Mike Mosley, Rick Mears, and Tom Sneva. Four additional spots would be available, for a total of eight participants. Qualifying heats were scheduled for May 17–20 in order to fill the four at-large berths. Teams were required to change two tires and simulate a fuel hookup.

Since the first weekend of time trials for the race was rained out, the four automatic berths would not be confirmed until after the second weekend of qualifying. The pit stop contest qualifying heats were held as planned, with the results tentative until the automatic berths were known. The results were as follows: Howdy Holmes (14.489 seconds), Al Loquasto (15.691 seconds), Pancho Carter (16.220 seconds), Bobby Rahal (16.374 seconds), Tony Bettenhausen, Mario Andretti (17.833 seconds), Teo Fabi (21.497 seconds), and Ken Schrader (29.727 seconds).

The eliminations consisted of two rounds. The preliminary round would feature two teams at a time, racing head-to-head against the clock. The two fastest teams overall - regardless of the individual head-to-head results - would advance to the final round. Rick Mears defeated Pancho Carter in the final round to win the event for the second year in a row.

Preliminary Round
Rank	Car No.	Driver	Team
3	33	Teo Fabi	Forsythe Racing
4	18	Mike Mosley	KRACO Racing
5	30	Howdy Holmes	Doug Shierson Racing
6	5	Tom Sneva	Bignotti-Carter
7	86	Al Loquasto	George T. Smith
8	4	Bobby Rahal	Truesports

Finals
2	Rick Mears (Penske Racing)	13.860
21	Pancho Carter (Alex Morales)	15.528

== Starting grid ==
Row	Inside		Middle		Outside	
1	33	(Italy) Teo Fabi R	18	(United States) Mike Mosley	2	(United States) Rick Mears W
2	5	(United States) Tom Sneva	19	(United States) Al Unser Jr. R	4	(United States) Bobby Rahal
3	7	(United States) Al Unser W	9	(United States) Roger Mears	10	(United States) Tony Bettenhausen Jr.
4	20	(United States) Gordon Johncock W	3	(United States) Mario Andretti W	30	(United States) Howdy Holmes
5	1	(United States) George Snider	21	(United States) Pancho Carter	94	(United States) Bill Whittington
6	60	(United States) Chip Ganassi	35	(United States) Patrick Bedard R	55	(Mexico) Josele Garza
7	56	(United States) Steve Chassey R	22	(United States) Dick Simon	25	(United States) Danny Ongais
8	16	(United States) Kevin Cogan	66	(United States) Johnny Parsons	14	(United States) A. J. Foyt W
9	72	(United States) Chris Kneifel R	12	(Australia) Geoff Brabham	91	(United States) Don Whittington
10	34	(Republic of Ireland) Derek Daly R	37	(United States) Scott Brayton	29	(United States) Mike Chandler
11	43	(United States) Steve Krisiloff	38	(United States) Chet Fillip	90	(Australia) Dennis Firestone

=== Alternates ===
- First alternate: John Mahler (#92) – Bumped
- Second alternate: none

=== Failed to qualify ===
- Bill Alsup (#11) – Waved off
- Dick Ferguson (#69) – Waved off
- Bill Tempero R (#15) – Waved off
- Spike Gehlhausen (#47) – Incomplete qualifying attempt
- Gary Bettenhausen (#28) – Incomplete qualifying attempt
- Larry "Boom Boom" Cannon (#17) – in line when qualifying suspended
- Tom Bigelow (#6)
- Phil Caliva R (#42)
- Herm Johnson (#42, #81)
- Jerry Karl (#61)
- Sheldon Kinser (#42)
- Phil Krueger R (#46)
- Greg Leffler (#64)
- Al Loquasto (#86)
- Harry MacDonald R (#43)
- Roger Rager (#88)
- Jerry Sneva (#69) – replaced by Dick Ferguson
- Bill Vukovich II (#83)
- Ken Schrader R (#98) – Wrecked in practice
- Jim Buick R (#26) – Wrecked in practice
- Rich Vogler R (#8) – Wrecked in practice
- Bob Harkey (#79) – Wrecked in practice, injured
- John Paul Jr. (#12) R – Wrecked in practice, injured, replaced by Geoff Brabham
- Pete Halsmer (#66) – Wrecked in practice, injured - replaced by Johnny Parsons
- Doug Heveron R (#41, #61) – Wrecked in practice, injured
- Johnny Rutherford (#40) – Wrecked in practice, injured
- Desiré Wilson R (#54) – Incomplete refresher test (blew engine)
- Chuck Ciprich R (#36) – Did not complete rookie test
- Mark Alderson R (#17) – Did not complete rookie test
- Mack McClellan R (#17) – Did not complete rookie test
- Teddy Pilette R (#42) – Did not complete rookie test
- Amber Furst R – Entry denied due to lack of experience

== Race summary ==
=== First half ===
Rookie Teo Fabi took the lead from the pole position and led the first 23 laps. A. J. Foyt, who earlier in the week had attended his father's funeral, dropped out early with a broken transmission u-joint linkage. At almost the same time, George Snider, Foyt's other team car, dropped out with ignition failure. Both Foyt cars were out just beyond the 50-mile mark. This would be Foyt's only IndyCar race of 1983 because a few weeks later while practicing for the NASCAR Firecracker 400 at Daytona, Foyt would have a serious accident that would shatter 2 vertebrae in his back, ending his 1983 racing season. After showing speed early, Fabi dropped out with a bad fuel gasket. During an early pit stop, the refueling mechanism failed, and fuel spilled around the car, but it did not ignite.

On lap 81, Johnny Parsons spun in front of Mario Andretti in turn one. Both cars crashed hard into the outside wall. It was Andretti's first ride at Indy with Newman/Haas Racing, and yet another misfortune for him at the 500.

=== Second half ===
First half contender who led his first ever laps at the speedway, Bobby Rahal, dropped out with a punctured radiator. The lead in the second half was maintained by Tom Sneva and Al Unser Sr. Sneva's teammate Kevin Cogan, as well as Geoff Brabham were also running near the top five.

On lap 172, Tom Sneva led with Al Unser Sr. second. Sneva was right behind the lapped car of Mike Mosley when his pit crew put out the sign board for him to make his final pit stop. Seconds later, Mosley spun right in front of Sneva coming out of turn one and crashed into the outside wall. Mosley suffered a bruised foot in the wreck. Sneva veered to the inside and narrowly avoided the incident. Mosley's notable "Indy jinx" continued, and it would be his final lap at the Speedway - he was killed in a traffic accident less than a year later.

With the yellow out, Sneva pitted the next time around, his final scheduled pit stop of the day. Al Unser Sr. was also in the pits. Unser had a much faster pit stop, electing not to change tires, and came out in the lead. Sneva was now second.

=== Finish ===
The green flag came back out on lap 176 with Al Unser Sr. leading and Tom Sneva in second. As the cars were going through turn four, the 10th place car of rookie Al Unser Jr. (five laps down at the time) jumped the restart. He passed both Sneva and his father Al Sr. One lap later, Al Jr. allowed his father by, and settled in between his father and second place Tom Sneva. Over the next several laps, it became clear that Al Jr. was attempting to run interference for his father. Al Jr. was known to openly root for his father, and incidentally it was Al Sr.'s 44th birthday. As the race hit lap 180, officials started displaying Al Unser Jr. the blue flag.

The blue "move over" courtesy flag.

While many feel Al Jr. did not actually make many onerous and intentional "blocking" moves, he did create a significant amount of "dirty air" for Sneva, and did not yield the preferred racing line. Despite the impedance, Al Sr. was not pulling away nor seemed able to extend his lead. The three cars continued to run very close together. As the laps dwindled, the controversy began to grow.

With 13 laps to go, Sneva pulled alongside Al Unser Jr. on the frontstretch. The two cars went side-by-side into turn one, but Al Jr. refused to give up the ground.

With ten laps to go, the three cars caught up to slower lapped traffic. Al Jr. got stuck behind the car of Dick Simon, and Sneva immediately pounced on the moment. Sneva veered down low, passed Al Jr. and Simon in consecutive corners, and set his sights on the leader. Down the backstretch, Sneva set up his pass and easily got by Al Unser Sr. going into turn three. He passed two more cars before the end of the lap and immediately began building a lead.

With an open track ahead of him now, Tom Sneva picked up the pace and put considerable distance between himself and Unser. Sneva cruised to victory, by a margin of 11.174 seconds. It was Sneva's first Indy 500 victory (after three previous runner-up finishes), and first victory in a 500-mile race since the 1977 Pocono 500. It was also chief mechanic George Bignotti's record seventh Indy 500 victory.

After stirring up controversy, Al Unser Jr. ran out of fuel on the final lap. He stalled on the course before reaching the finish line, and was scored six laps down at the finish.

=== Post race ===
In post-race interviews, Al Unser Jr. admitted to running interference for his father, claiming he was trying to create "dirty air" and turbulence for Tom Sneva. He stopped short, however, of calling it "blocking." Al Jr. was highly criticized for his actions, by both competitors and media. However, after the race USAC examined the incident, and issued no penalties for blocking, citing the fact that he did not actually break any written rules. Al Unser Sr. claimed he did not know what was going on behind him, because he had lost one of his rear-view mirrors, and the other one was broken. Furthermore, Al Sr. noted that he made a miscalculation on his final pit stop, ordering his crew to not change tires. As a result, his handling went away in the closing laps. While Al Jr. and Sneva were sparring, Al Sr. was instead preoccupied with nursing his loose, ill-handling machine. Years later, Al Sr. opined that the press blew the incident out of proportion. He defended Al Jr., saying his son was merely 'using the air' and not 'blocking' Sneva. Al Jr. conceded that his efforts to aid his father were futile anyway, quipping that "Sneva was a little too fast, and Dad was a little too slow".

Aside from the blocking incident, Sneva accused Al Jr. of jumping the restart and illegally passing cars before the green light came on. That infraction helped set the stage for the whole blocking situation to begin with. After the race, USAC issued Al Unser Jr. a two-lap penalty for passing two cars before the green light, but the penalty did not cost him any positions in the final order. Unser still finished in the top ten as the highest finishing rookie. However, he lost out on the rookie of the year award. The voters instead selected polesitter Teo Fabi.

== Box score ==
Finish	Start	No	Name	Qual	Chassis	Engine	Laps	Status
1	4	5	(United States) Tom Sneva	203.687	March 83C	Cosworth DFX	200	162.026 mph
2	7	7	(United States) Al Unser W	201.954	Penske PC-11	Cosworth DFX	200	+11.174 seconds
3	3	2	(United States) Rick Mears W	204.300	Penske PC-11	Cosworth DFX	200	+21.862 seconds
4	26	12	(Australia) Geoff Brabham	198.618	Penske PC-10	Cosworth DFX	199	-1 lap
5	22	16	(United States) Kevin Cogan	201.528	March 83C	Cosworth DFX	198	-2 laps
6	12	30	(United States) Howdy Holmes	199.295	March 83C	Cosworth DFX	198	-2 laps
7	14	21	(United States) Pancho Carter	198.237	March 82C	Cosworth DFX	197	-3 laps
8	16	60	(United States) Chip Ganassi	197.608	Wildcat IX	Cosworth DFX	195	-5 laps
9	29	37	(United States) Scott Brayton	196.713	March 83C	Cosworth DFX	195	-5 laps
10	5	19	(United States) Al Unser Jr. R **	202.146	Eagle 83	Cosworth DFX	192	Out of fuel
11	19	56	(United States) Steve Chassey R	195.108	Eagle 82	Chevy V-6	191	-9 laps
12	25	72	(United States) Chris Kneifel R	198.625	Primus 83	Cosworth DFX	191	-9 laps
13	2	18	(United States) Mike Mosley	205.372	March 83C	Cosworth DFX	169	Crash T1
14	10	20	(United States) Gordon Johncock W	199.748	Wildcat IX	Cosworth DFX	163	Gearbox
15	20	22	(United States) Dick Simon	192.993	March 83C	Cosworth DFX	161	-39 laps
16	30	29	(United States) Mike Chandler	194.934	Rattlesnake	Cosworth DFX	153	Gearbox
17	9	10	(United States) Tony Bettenhausen Jr.	199.894	March 83C	Cosworth DFX	152	Half shaft
18	15	94	(United States) Bill Whittington	197.755	March 81C	Cosworth DFX	144	Gearbox
19	28	34	(Republic of Ireland) Derek Daly R	197.658	March 83C	Cosworth DFX	126	Engine
20	6	4	(United States) Bobby Rahal	202.005	March 83C	Cosworth DFX	110	Radiator
21	21	25	(United States) Danny Ongais	202.320	March 83C	Cosworth DFX	101	Handling
22	23	66	(United States) Johnny Parsons	199.985	Penske PC-10B	Cosworth DFX	80	Crash T1
23	11	3	(United States) Mario Andretti W *	199.404	Lola T700	Cosworth DFX	79	Crash T1
24	33	90	(Australia) Dennis Firestone	190.888	March 83C	Cosworth DFX	77	Oil leak
25	18	55	(Mexico) Josele Garza	195.671	Penske PC-10	Cosworth DFX	64	Oil leak
26	1	33	(Italy) Teo Fabi R	207.395	March 83C	Cosworth DFX	47	Fuel gasket
27	27	91	(United States) Don Whittington	198.596	March 83C	Cosworth DFX	44	Ignition
28	8	9	(United States) Roger Mears	200.108	Penske PC-10	Cosworth DFX	43	Crash T1
29	31	43	(United States) Steve Krisiloff	191.192	Lola T700	Cosworth DFX	42	U-Joint
30	17	35	(United States) Patrick Bedard R	195.941	March 83C	Cosworth DFX	25	Crash FS
31	24	14	(United States) A. J. Foyt W	199.557	March 83C	Cosworth DFX	24	Shift linkage
32	13	1	(United States) George Snider	198.544	March 83C	Cosworth DFX	22	Ignition
33	32	38	(United States) Chet Fillip	183.145	Eagle 83	Cosworth DFX	11	Black Flagged

W Former Indianapolis 500 winner

R Indianapolis 500 Rookie

All cars utilized Goodyear tires.

* Mario Andretti was penalized one lap for running over Al Unser Jr's hose during a pit stop. Parsons and Andretti collided with one another on lap 81; the penalty put Andretti into 23rd place one lap behind Parsons.

** Al Unser Jr. was penalized two laps for passing cars under yellow before the lap 176 restart, taking him from +6 laps (where he ran out of fuel) to +8 laps.

=== Race statistics ===
Lap Leaders
Laps	Leader
1–23	Teo Fabi
24	Mike Mosley
25–26	Rick Mears
27–35	Al Unser Sr.
36–46	Tom Sneva
47–52	Al Unser Sr.
53–66	Bobby Rahal
67–73	Tom Sneva
74	Bobby Rahal
75–80	Al Unser Sr.
81–89	Tom Sneva
90–108	Al Unser Sr.
109–143	Tom Sneva
144–146	Al Unser Sr.
147–173	Tom Sneva
174–190	Al Unser Sr.
191–200	Tom Sneva

Total laps led
Driver	Laps
Tom Sneva	98
Al Unser Sr.	61
Teo Fabi	23
Bobby Rahal	15
Rick Mears	2
Mike Mosley	1

Cautions: 5 for 30 laps
Laps	Reason
28–32	Patrick Bedard crash turn 4
45–51	Roger Mears crash turn 1
83–90	Johnny Parsons, Mario Andretti crash turn 1
157–160	Bill Whittington tow-in
171–176	Mike Mosley crash turn 4

== Broadcasting ==
=== Radio ===
The race was carried live on the IMS Radio Network. Paul Page served as anchor for the seventh year. Lou Palmer reported from victory lane. The crew saw little change from 1982, but some of the assignments were shifted. Longtime radio veteran Luke Walton assumed his customary duty during the pre-race ceremonies of introducing the starting command. However, he did not serve as a pit reporter during the race itself. Walton would continue on the broadcast, but only in a limited role, through 1988.

Bob Forbes rode in one of the pace cars during the parade lap.

Lou Palmer maintained his traditional location at the far south end of the pits. However, the other pit reporters appeared to have lesser-defined zones for 1983. During the first half of the race, all pit reporters congregated around the leaders' pits, including roving reporter Bob Forbes. During the second half of the race, Jerry Baker moved up to the north pits and Chuck Marlowe covered the center pits. Forbes then moved to the garage area and track hospital, while Palmer stayed in the south end. Sally Larvick returned for her second race, conducting interviews throughout the broadcast.

For 1983, after a brief one-year change, the famous commercial out-cue was restored back to "Now stay tuned for the Greatest Spectacle in Racing." For the first time, the broadcast signed on at 10:00 a.m. local time, providing one-hour of pre-race coverage.

Indianapolis Motor Speedway Radio Network
Booth Announcers	Turn Reporters	Pit/garage reporters
Chief Announcer: Paul Page; Driver expert: Rodger Ward; Statistician: John DeCamp; Historian: Donald Davidson	Turn 1: Ron Carrell; Turn 2: Doug Zink; Backstretch: Howdy Bell; Turn 3: Larry Henry; Turn 4: Bob Jenkins	Luke Walton (pre-race); Sally Larvick (interviews); Bob Forbes (pits/garages)
Chief Announcer: Paul Page; Driver expert: Rodger Ward; Statistician: John DeCamp; Historian: Donald Davidson	Turn 1: Ron Carrell; Turn 2: Doug Zink; Backstretch: Howdy Bell; Turn 3: Larry Henry; Turn 4: Bob Jenkins	Jerry Baker (north pits); Chuck Marlowe (center pits); Lou Palmer (south pits)

=== Television ===
The race was carried in the United States on ABC Sports on a same-day tape delay basis. Jim McKay returned as anchor, while Jackie Stewart reprised the host position in "ABC Race Central." Sam Posey returned to the booth as driver expert, while Jim Lampley made his first appearance, covering primarily the garages and medical center. Anne Simon, a sideline reporter at ABC Sports, joined the crew for in-depth features, and is believed to be the first female television reporter at Indy.

For the first time ever, the broadcast featured a RaceCam. On-board cameras were mounted in the cars of Rick Mears and Al Unser Sr., but both failed partway through the race.

The broadcast has re-aired on ESPN Classic starting in May 2011.

ABC Television
Booth Announcers	Pit/garage reporters
Host: Jackie Stewart; Announcer: Jim McKay; Color: Sam Posey	Chris Economaki; Bill Flemming; Jim Lampley; Anne Simon (features)

== Gallery ==
1983 Buick Riviera pace car

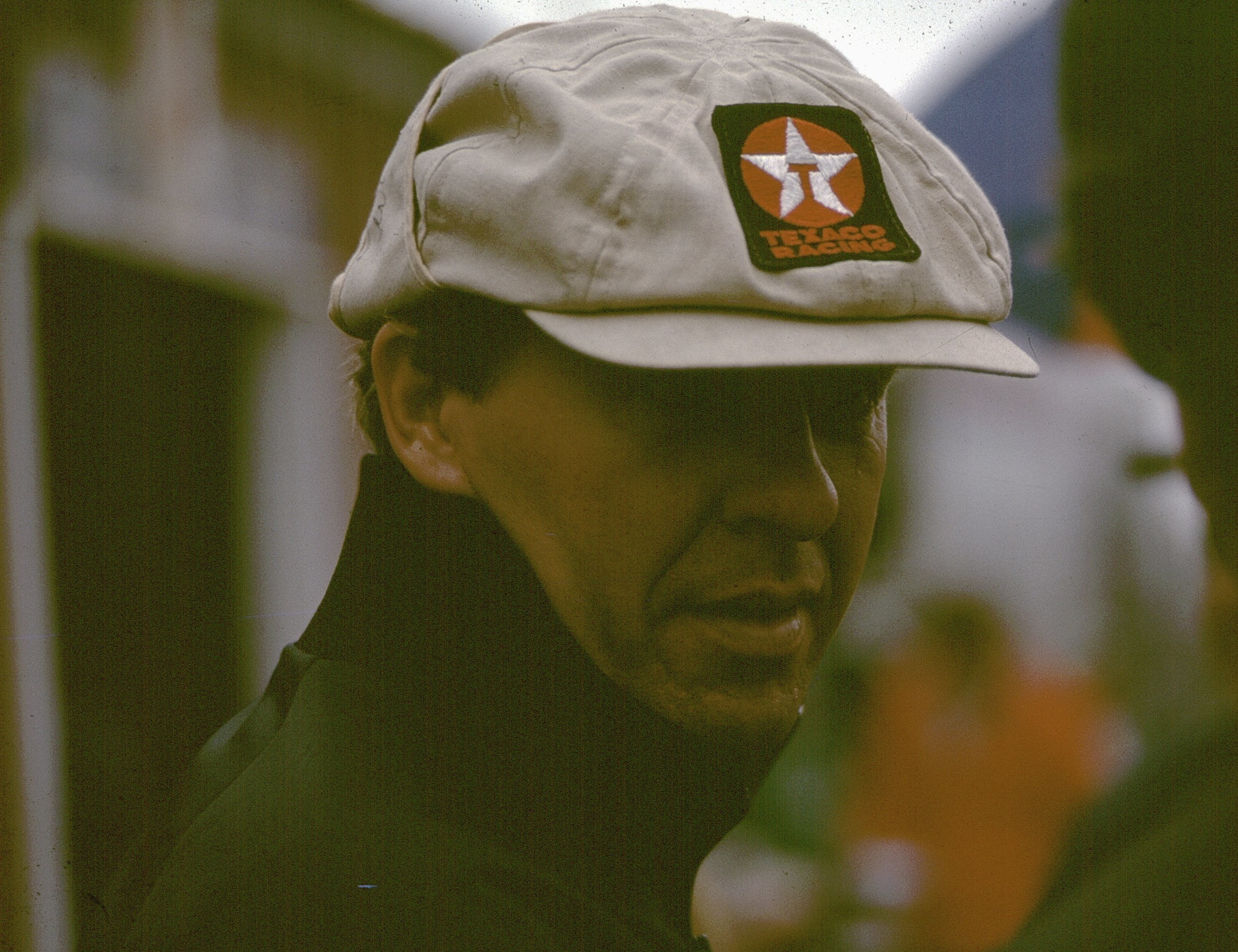
Race winner Tom Sneva

== Notes ==
=== See also ===
- 1982–83 USAC Championship Car season

=== References ===
5. https://www.nytimes.com/1983/05/30/sports/sneva-takes-indianapolis-500-with-al-unser-sr-2d.html

=== Works cited ===
- 1983 Indianapolis 500 Day-By-Day Trackside Report For the Media
- Indianapolis 500 History: Race & All-Time Stats - Official Site
- 1983 Indianapolis 500 Radio Broadcast, Indianapolis Motor Speedway Radio Network

1982 Indianapolis 500; Gordon Johncock	1983 Indianapolis 500; Tom Sneva	1984 Indianapolis 500; Rick Mears
