= Jim Buick =

American racing driver

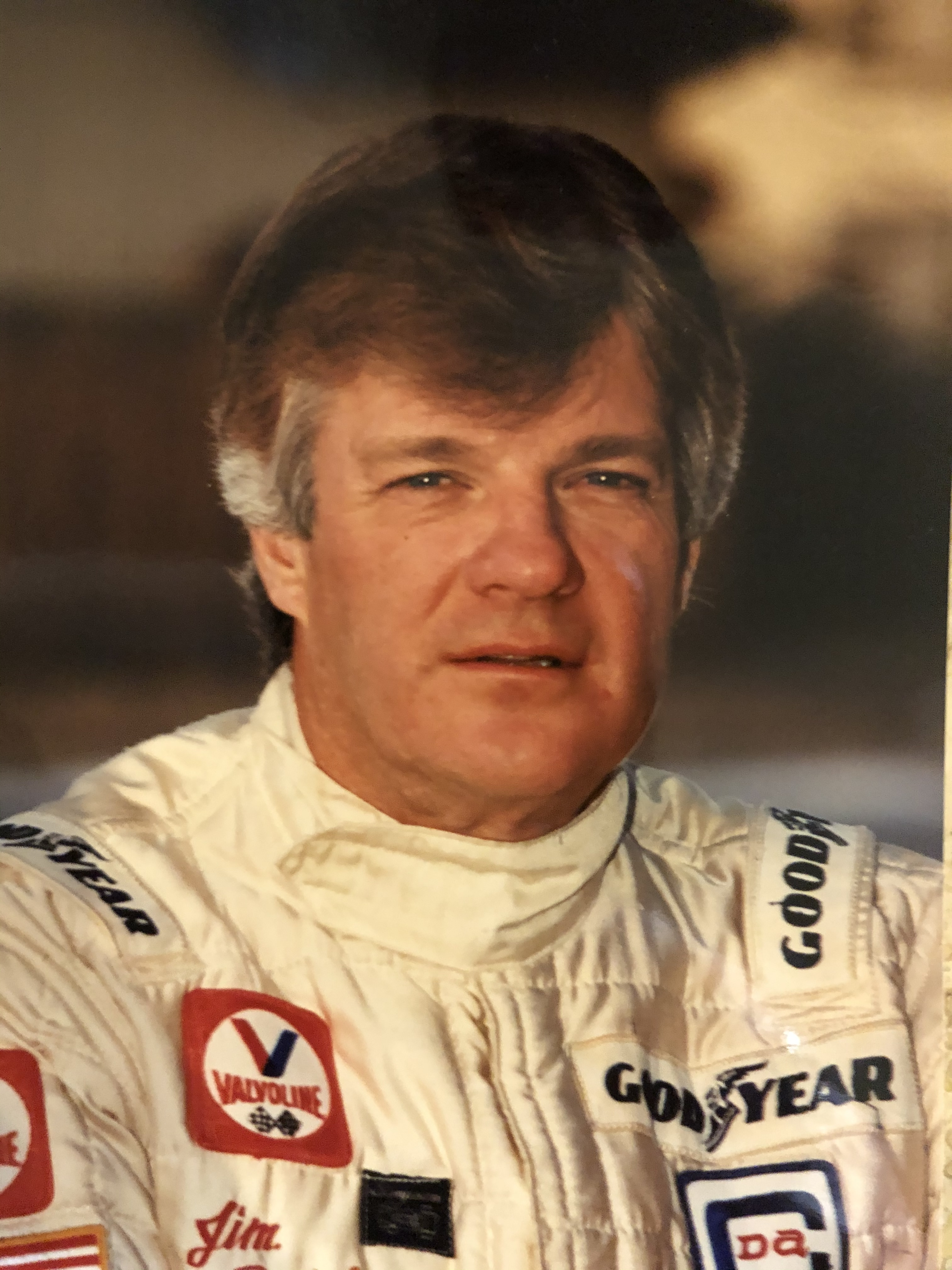

James Joseph Buick III (born December 14, 1940–September 5, 2020) was an American former racing driver from Omaha, Nebraska who competed in the United States Auto Club (USAC) and Champion Auto Racing Team (CART) series in 1981. His wife, Stacey Buick was the team owner and was the first female team owner in the CART series. James (Jim) started four races in 1981 with a best finish of 16th, and though he qualified for the Indianapolis 500, he was bumped the next day. He was driving a seven year old Chevrolet powered Eagle. Buick again attempted but failed to make the Indy 500 in 1983 in a Chevrolet-powered three year old Penske chassis.

Buick continued racing with the American Indycar Series (AIS) which began in 1988 and continued until 2002. His best race finish was 11th, he was ranked 20th by the end of the series.

Then with the formation of the Indy Racing League IRL in 1996, the then 55-year-old Buick attempted to qualify for the series' first race at Walt Disney World Speedway in a 1992 Lola, but was unable to qualify. He still earned $10,000 for his entry.

Buick was a career airline pilot for Frontier Airlines and later Continental Airlines after that airline acquired Frontier and resided in Arvada, Colorado.

== IRL IndyCar Series ==
Year	Team	Chassis	Engine	1	2	3	Rank	Points
1996	O'Brien Motorsports	Lola T92	Buick	WDW; DNQ	PHX	INDY	-	0
