= Patrick Bedard =

American journalist and racing driver (born 1941)

- Born: August 20, 1941 (age 85); Waterloo, Iowa, US

Champ Car career
- 6 races run over 3 years
- First race: 1982 Stroh's 200 (Atlanta)
- Last race: 1984 Indianapolis 500
Wins	Podiums	Poles
0	0	0

Patrick Bedard (born August 20, 1941) is an American former journalist and racing driver. Bedard worked for Car and Driver from 1967 to 2009.

== Career ==
Bedard joined Car and Driver in 1967. In the early 1970s, Car and Driver magazine challenged its readers to a series of Sports Car Club of America (SCCA)-sanctioned, 25-lap "showroom stock sedan" races. In the Car and Driver SS/Sedan Challenge II, Bedard finished first, driving Car & Driver's own Opel 1900 sedan. In the Car and Driver SS/Sedan Challenge III in 1974, Bedard drove a 1973 Chevy Vega GT No. 0, winning the tie-breaker race. This lone Vega beat 31 other well-driven showroom stocks.

The first racing victory by a Wankel-engined car in the United States was in 1973, when Bedard won an IMSA RS race at Lime Rock Park in a Mazda RX-2. Bedard also captured a pole position at the Pocono Raceway road course, but did not finish due to a blown clutch at the start of the race.

Bedard entered the 1981 and 1982 Indianapolis 500 but did not qualify. At the age of 41 Bedard qualified for his first Indianapolis 500 in 1983, finishing in 30th after crashing in turn 4 on lap 25. Bedard raced at the 1983 Michigan 500, spinning behind Gordon Johncock's broken car and in front of race leader Tom Sneva.

After qualifying for the 1984 Indianapolis 500, Bedard was involved in a major accident on lap 59. Bedard's car spun exiting turn 3 and into the inside guardrail, flipping three times. Bedard suffered a concussion and a broken jaw. Jim Murray of the Los Angeles Times criticized Bedard's participation, claiming "just because you can drive 10 laps on an empty, manicured track early in May does not mean you are ready for the firefight of the last Sunday in May." Bedard retired from racing after this crash.

After nearly 42 consecutive years of employment with Car and Driver, Bedard announced he was leaving the magazine in his regular column after the August 2009 issue.

== Racing record ==
=== USAC Mini-Indy Series results ===
Year	Entrant	1	2	3	4	5	6	Pos	Points
1980		MIL	POC	MOH	MIN1; 8	MIN2; 11	ONT	**21st**	**70**

=== Indianapolis 500 results ===
Year	Chassis	Engine	Start	Finish	Note	Team
1981	Vollstedt	Offenhauser	—	—	Failed to qualify	Escort Radar Detector
1982	Penske PC-7	Cosworth	—	—	Failed to qualify	Escort Radar Detector
1983	March 83C	Cosworth	17	30	Crash	Escort Radar Detector
1984	March 84C	Cosworth	19	30	Crash	Escort Radar Detector

(key) (Races in bold indicate pole position)

=== 24 Hours of Le Mans results ===
Year	Team	Co-Drivers	Car	Class	Laps	Pos.	Class Pos.
1982	(United States) BF Goodrich	(United States) Paul Miller (Liechtenstein) Manfred Schurti	Porsche 924 Carrera GTR	IMSA; GTO	128	DNF	DNF
