= Lola T700 =

Open-wheel racing car chassis

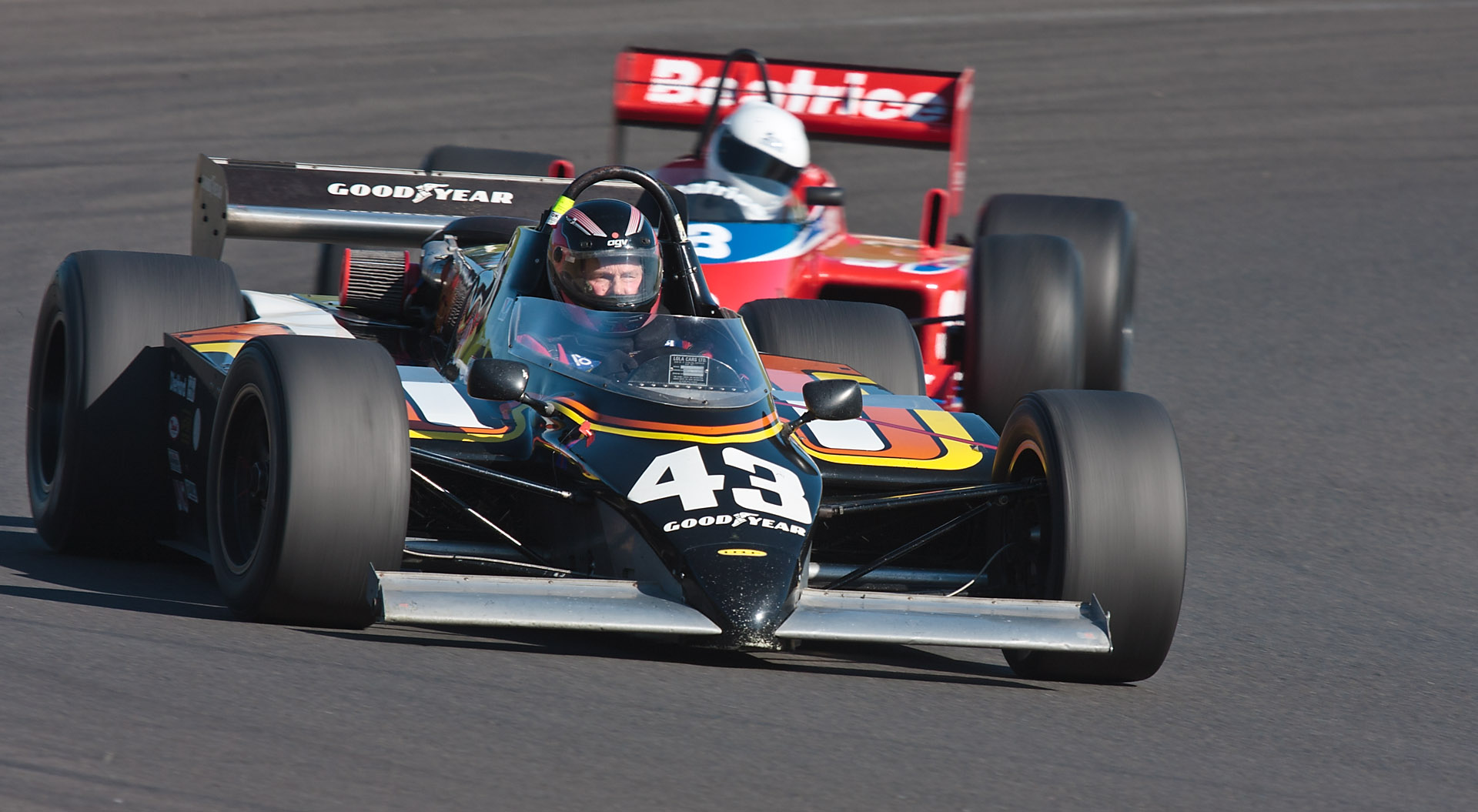
Lola T700 IndyCar

The Lola T700 is an open-wheel racing car chassis, designed, developed and built by Lola Cars, that competed in the CART open-wheel racing series, for competition in the 1983 IndyCar season. It was powered by the 700 hp (520 kW) Ford-Cosworth DFX. It won two races that season, at Road America and Caesars Palace, both while being driven by Mario Andretti. Only 3 models were produced. It did manage to score 6 podium finishes, also all with Andretti. Andretti eventually finished the season championship that year in 3rd-place, with 133 points.
