= Penske PC-11 =

- Category: CART IndyCar
- Constructor: Penske
- Designer: Geoff Ferris
- Predecessor: Penske PC-10
- Successor: Penske PC-12

Technical specifications
- Chassis: Aluminum Monocoque
- Suspension: Inboard springs and Fox shocks front and rear, operated by top rocker arm with front and lower rear A arms of streamline tubing
- Engine: Ford-Cosworth 2,650 cc (161.7 cu in) V8 80° Mid-engined, longitudinally mounted
- Transmission: Hewland V.G. 4-speed manual
- Weight: 1,550 lb (703.1 kg)
- Fuel: Methanol, supplied by Mobil
- Tyres: Goodyear Eagle Speedway Specials - Rear 27.0x14.5-15 - Front 25.5x10.0-15

Competition history
- Notable entrants: Penske Racing
- Notable drivers: Rick Mears; Al Unser
Races	Wins	Podiums	Poles
13	2	2	1

The Penske PC-11 was a CART open-wheel race car, designed by Penske Racing, which was constructed for competition in the 1983 IndyCar season.
