= George Bignotti =

American auto racing mechanic and team owner

- Bignotti, c. 1974
- Born: January 12, 1916; San Mateo, California, U.S.
- Died: September 27, 2013 (aged 97); Las Vegas, Nevada, U.S.
- Known for: Motorsport mechanic and team owner

George Adolph Bignotti (January 12, 1916 – September 27, 2013) was an American motor racing mechanic and team owner who was active in American open-wheel car racing from the 1950s through the 1980s. Bignotti was one of the most successful chief mechanics in the history of IndyCar Racing, as cars prepared by him won 85 races, including seven victories in the Indianapolis 500. Additionally, Bignotti-prepared cars were used to win nine USAC Championship Car seasons. Bignotti also found success as a team owner, co-owning entries in the early 1960s with Bob Bowes and in the 1980s with Dan Cotter and earning multiple race victories, including two Indianapolis 500s.

== Life and career ==
Bignotti was born in San Mateo, California, on January 12, 1916. As of the 1930 United States census, he was living in San Francisco with his parents and two older brothers.

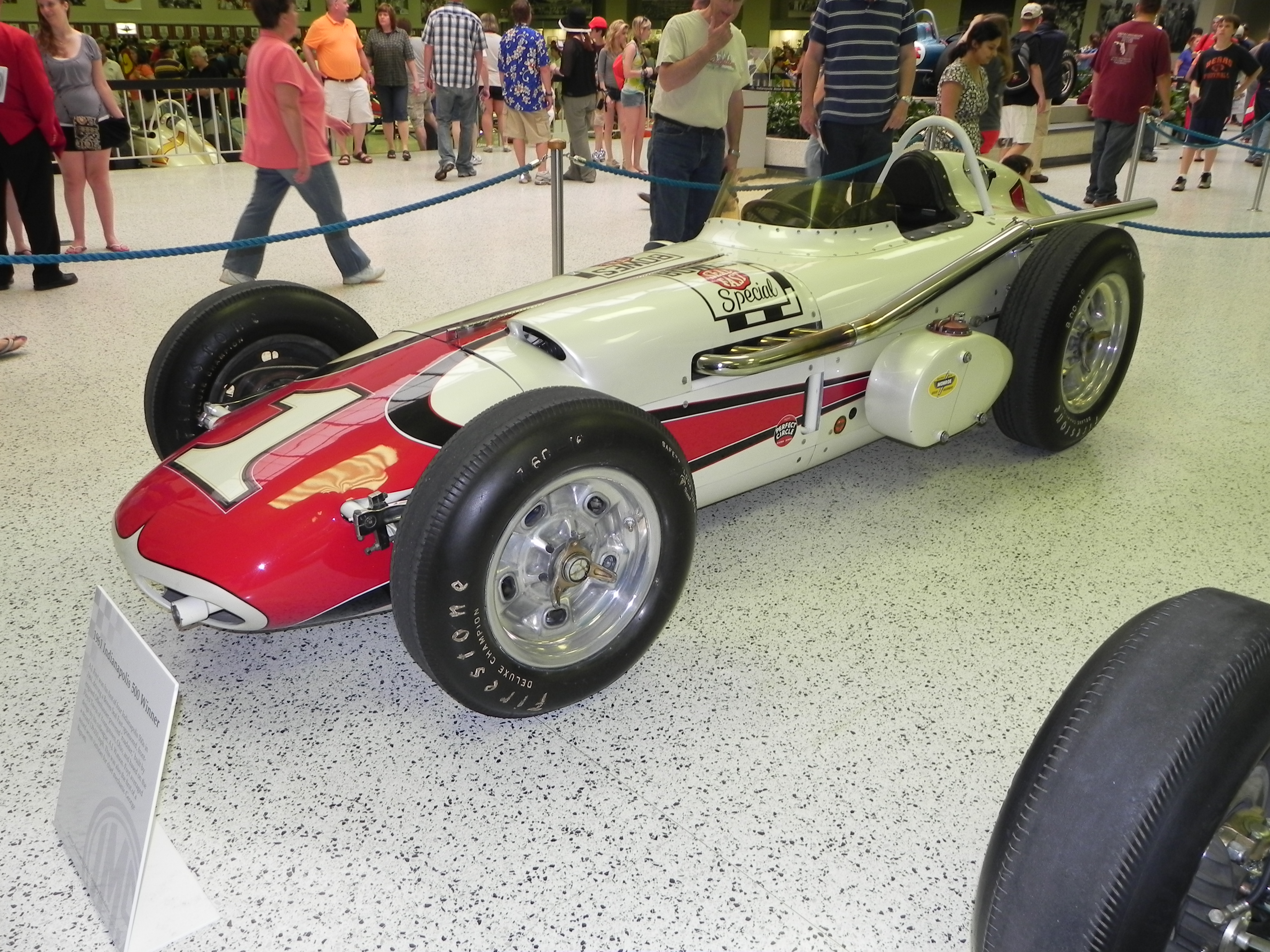
The 1961 Indianapolis 500 winning car co-owned by Bignotti and driven by A. J. Foyt

Bignotti became a successful mechanic in midget car racing in California in the late 1940s, winning championships as chief mechanic for driver Fred Agabashian and allowing him the quit his full-time job working as a shipbuilder. However, as the popularity of midget-car racing declined at the end of the decade, Bignotti was forced to leave racing behind for several years and take a job in his mother-in-law's flower shop. He returned to the chief mechanic role in 1954, when Agabashian asked him to join his team for the Indianapolis 500. Agabashain went on to finish sixth in the race, and Bignotti became a near-permanent figure in open-wheel racing for the next several decades. In 1956, Bignotti joined forces with Bob Bowes, the president of the Bowes Seal-Fast Corporation, to form Bignotti-Bowes Racing, where Bignotti served as co-owner and chief mechanic. The team found moderate success with drivers Johnny Boyd and Jud Larson in their first years. In 1960, the team signed A. J. Foyt to drive. With the combination of Bignotti as chief mechanic and Foyt as driver, the team dominated American open-wheel racing, winning four championships and 27 races, including winning ten races in the 13-race 1964 USAC season. Despite the team's success, Bignotti and Foyt fought frequently, leading to Bignotti briefly departing his chief mechanic role several times before the pairing permanently separated mid-way through the 1965 season.

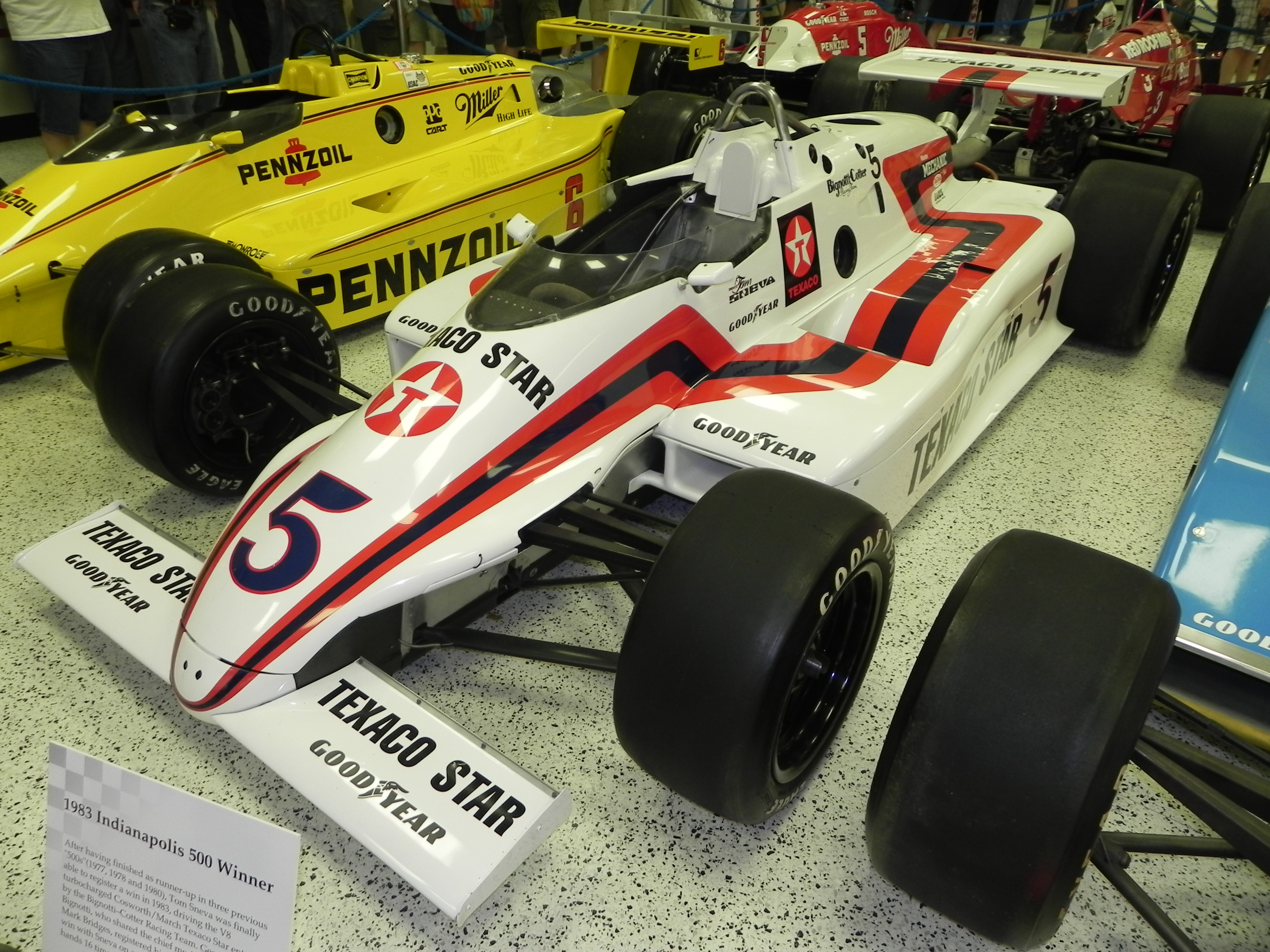
The March 83C co-owned by Bignotti that won the 1983 Indianapolis 500 with Tom Sneva driving.

For 1966, Bignotti served as chief mechanic for the team run by oil magnate John W. Mecom Jr. for the Indianapolis 500. Graham Hill won the race for the team, while teammate Jackie Stewart led the most laps before dropping out with a mechanical failure. At the close of the decade, Bignotti joined Parnelli Jones' Vel's Parnelli Jones Racing team, finding more success. Serving as chief mechanic for Al Unser, Bignotti won the 1970 and 1971 Indianapolis 500 as well as the 1970 USAC Championship, winning ten races during the season and equaling the feat achieved by himself and Foyt in 1964. Bignotti won two further USAC Championships with Joe Leonard in 1971 and 1972. Bignotti joined forces with Patrick Racing beginning in 1973, finding success with driver Gordon Johncock with victory in the 1973 Indianapolis 500 and the 1976 USAC Championship. In the early 1980s, Bignotti co-owned a team again, joining forces with True Value CEO Dan Cotter to form Bignotti-Cotter Racing. With driver Tom Sneva, the team won the 1983 Indianapolis 500—Bignotti's final "500" win. The Bignotti-Cotter team appeared for three more seasons fielding cars for Roberto Guerrero in the CART championship before the team folded and Bignotti retired. Bignotti's older brother Al co-worked as a mechanic during the Indianapolis 500 victories of 1966, 1970, 1971, and 1983.

After retirement, Bignotti remained in touch with many of his former drivers, notably A. J. Foyt, with whom he remained friends long after their careers ended despite the fights from their time working together. Bignotti was also an avid golfer and played up until age 90.

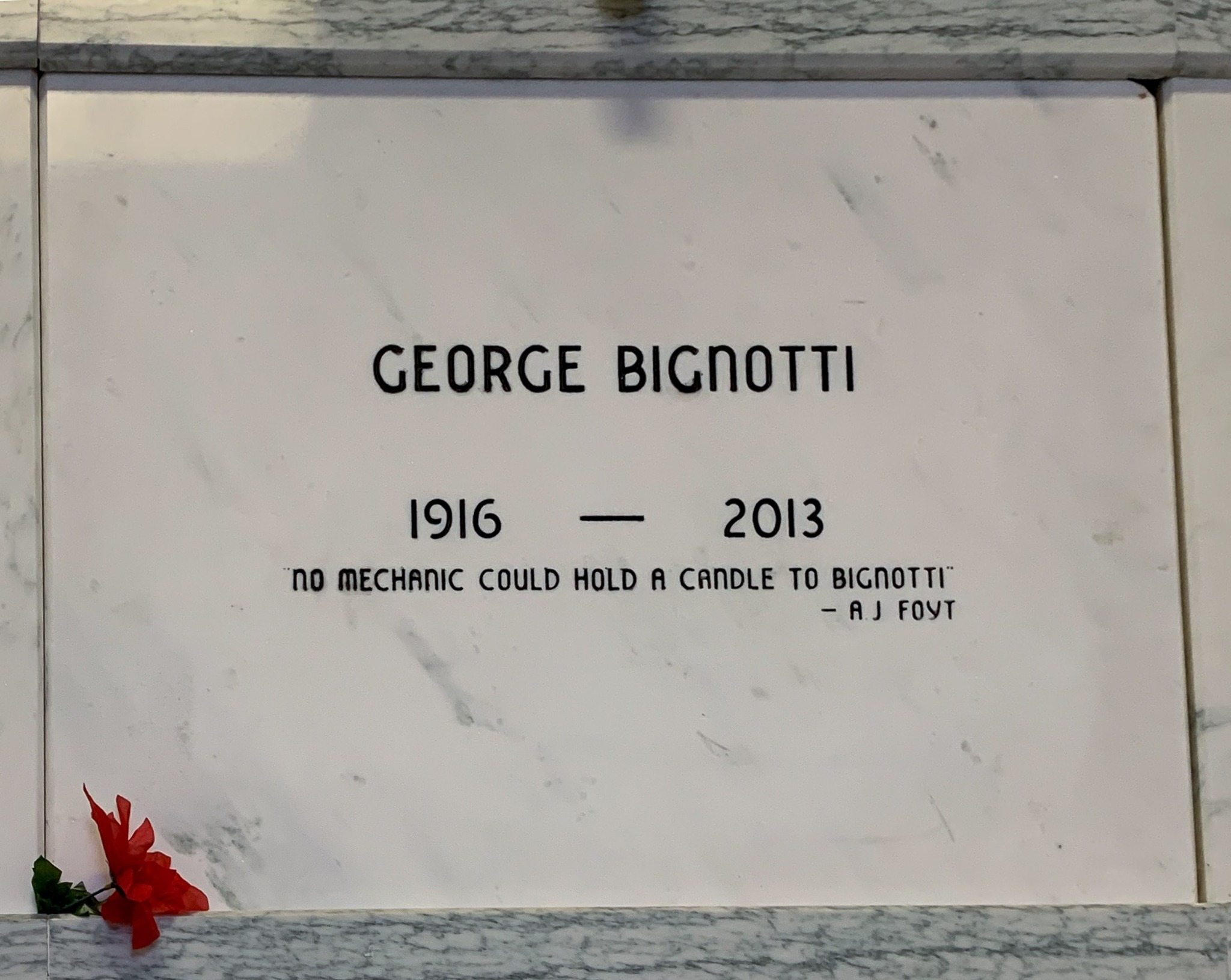
Bignotti's grave at Crown Hill Cemetery provided to Wikimedia Commons by Crown Hill Foundation.

Bignotti died in his sleep in his home in Las Vegas, Nevada, on September 27, 2013, at age 97. Bignotti is buried at Crown Hill Cemetery in Indianapolis, Indiana.

== Awards and honors ==
Bignotti has been inducted in to the following halls of fame:

- Indianapolis Motor Speedway Hall of Fame (1975)
- International Motorsports Hall of Fame (1993)
- Motorsports Hall of Fame of America (1993)
- National Midget Auto Racing Hall of Fame (2003)
- USAC Hall of Fame (2014)
- West Coast Stock Car/Motorsports Hall of Fame (2018)
