= Chuck Ciprich =

American racing driver (1941–2023)

Charles John Ciprich (November 30, 1941 – April 16, 2023) was an American racing driver from Sayre, Pennsylvania. A successful modified and Supermodified open wheel racer, who won numerous championships throughout the northeast, Ciprich tried his hand at Championship Car racing in 1983 and 1984.

Ciprich first attempted to qualify for the 1983 Indianapolis 500 in an unsophisticated Chevrolet powered Finley chassis fielded by Pace Racing. He made his CART Champ Car debut later that year at Pocono Raceway but qualified near the back of the field and was knocked out after 38 laps by a transmission failure. Ciprich and the Pace team arrived for the first oval race of the 1984 season at Phoenix International Raceway with a more advanced, yet year-old March-Cosworth combination yet failed to make the field. Their attempt to qualify the car for the 1984 Indianapolis 500 was equally unsuccessful and Ciprich returned to Modifieds.

Ciprich retired some years later and resided in Florida. He died from cancer on April 16, 2023, at the age of 81.
