= March 83C =

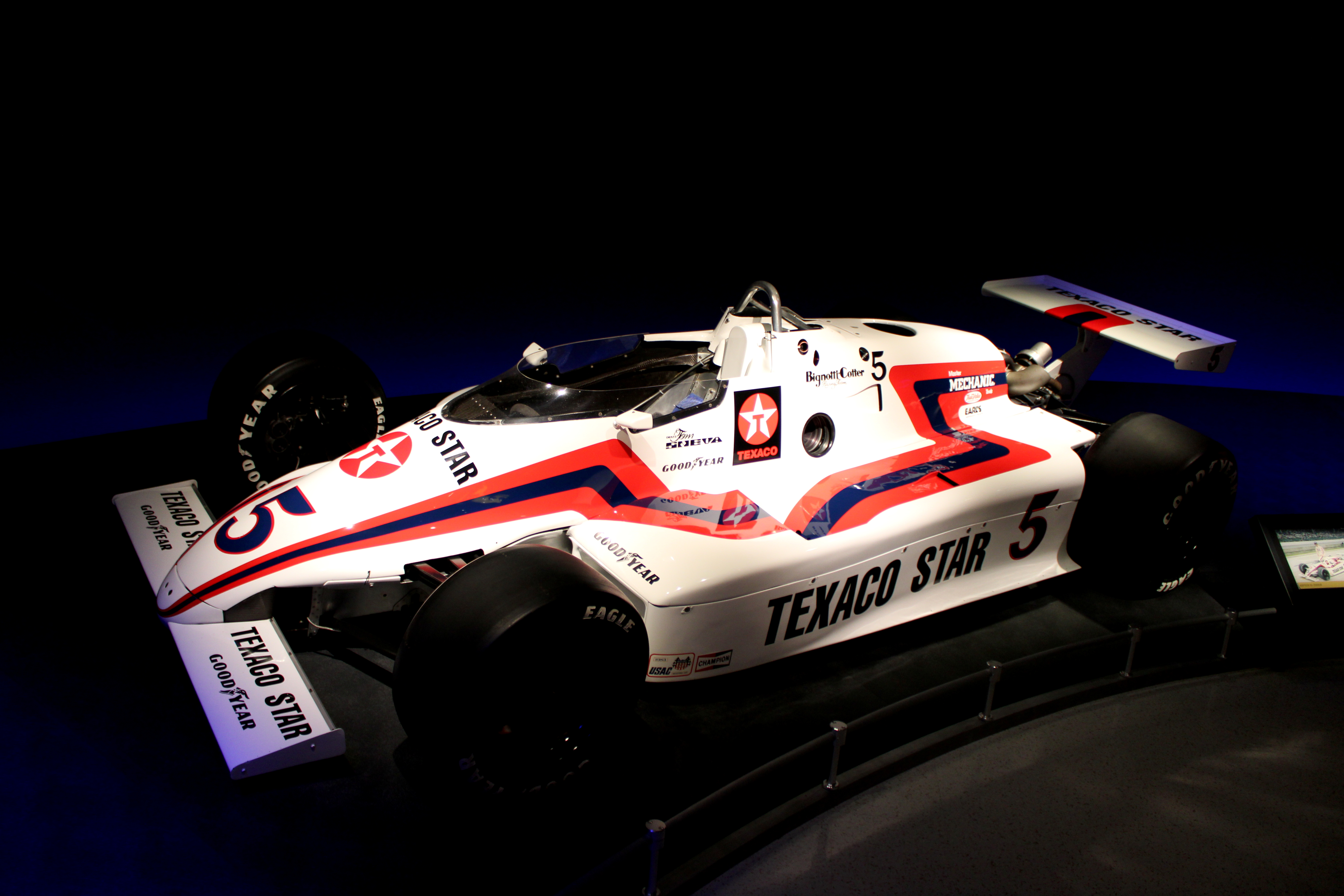
Image of the winning March 83C of the 1983 Indianapolis 500 (Tom Sneva)

The March 83C is an open-wheel race car, designed by and built by March Engineering, to compete in the 1983 IndyCar season. The car was extremely successful, winning 7 out of the 13 races, and taking 9 pole positions that season. Newey's March 83C chassis successfully clinched the 1983 Constructors' Championship, and the 1983 Indianapolis 500 with Tom Sneva. It was powered by the Ford-Cosworth DFX turbo V8 engine.
