= Dick Simon =

American racing driver (born 1933)

- Born: Richard Raymond Simon; September 21, 1933 (age 93) Seattle, Washington, U.S.

Champ Car career
- 183 races run over 20 years
- Years active: 1969–1988
- Best finish: 8th – 1979
- First race: 1970 Jimmy Bryan 150 (Phoenix)
- Last race: 1988 Bosch Spark Plug Grand Prix (Nazareth)
Wins	Podiums	Poles
0	1	0

Richard Raymond Simon (born September 21, 1933) is an American former auto racing driver and racing team owner. Simon drove Indy cars in USAC and CART, and made 17 starts at the Indianapolis 500. At the 1988 Indianapolis 500, Simon set a record as the oldest driver in Indy 500 history (54 years, 251 days), a record that was later broken by A. J. Foyt.

Simon was a longtime car owner, founding Dick Simon Racing, helping to begin the Indy car careers of Stéphan Grégoire, Arie Luyendyk, Raul Boesel, Lyn St. James, and many others. Simon had a notable record at the Indy 500. Of the many rookies he entered at Indy over the years, not a single one failed to qualify for the race. Simon never won a race as a driver or as an owner. His best finish as a driver was third at Ontario, and as an owner he had six second-place finishes. Simon had a best finish at the Indianapolis 500 of sixth in 1987 (as a driver), and 4th in 1993 as an owner with Boesel.

Simon sold his race team to Andy Evans who formed Team Scandia in 1997. He returned to Indy car racing in the late 1990s and entered cars in 2000 and 2001.

== Early life ==
Simon was born in Seattle, Washington. His mother developed multiple sclerosis, and died at a relatively young age, while Simon's father later left the family. This forced Simon to take over the upbringing of his younger siblings.

After completing his primary education in Seattle, Simon received a skiing scholarship that enabled him to attend the University of Utah. During his collegiate career he was highly decorated, twice winning the Intermountain Ski Jumping championship, and for three consecutive years winning the Landes Memorial Ski Jump, held in Alta, Utah.

Simon began his racing career in 1962, racing super modifieds. Between 1962 and 1967, he won more than 30 races in the western United States, and in 1965 won the South Lake Valley Racing Association championship.

== Championship car career ==
Simon made his first USAC Championship car appearance at Seattle International Raceway in 1969, failing to qualify for that as well as two other races that season. Simon made his first start in 1970, driving a second-hand Vollstedt chassis at Phoenix International Raceway, where he sidelined by magneto failure after only four laps. He made his Indianapolis 500 debut that season and finished 14th position. At Ontario Motor Speedway that September, Simon captured his career-best finish of third place, and he finished tenth in the 1970 USAC National Championship. Simon would continue to be marginally competitive throughout the 1970s, never matching his finishes of the 1970 season.

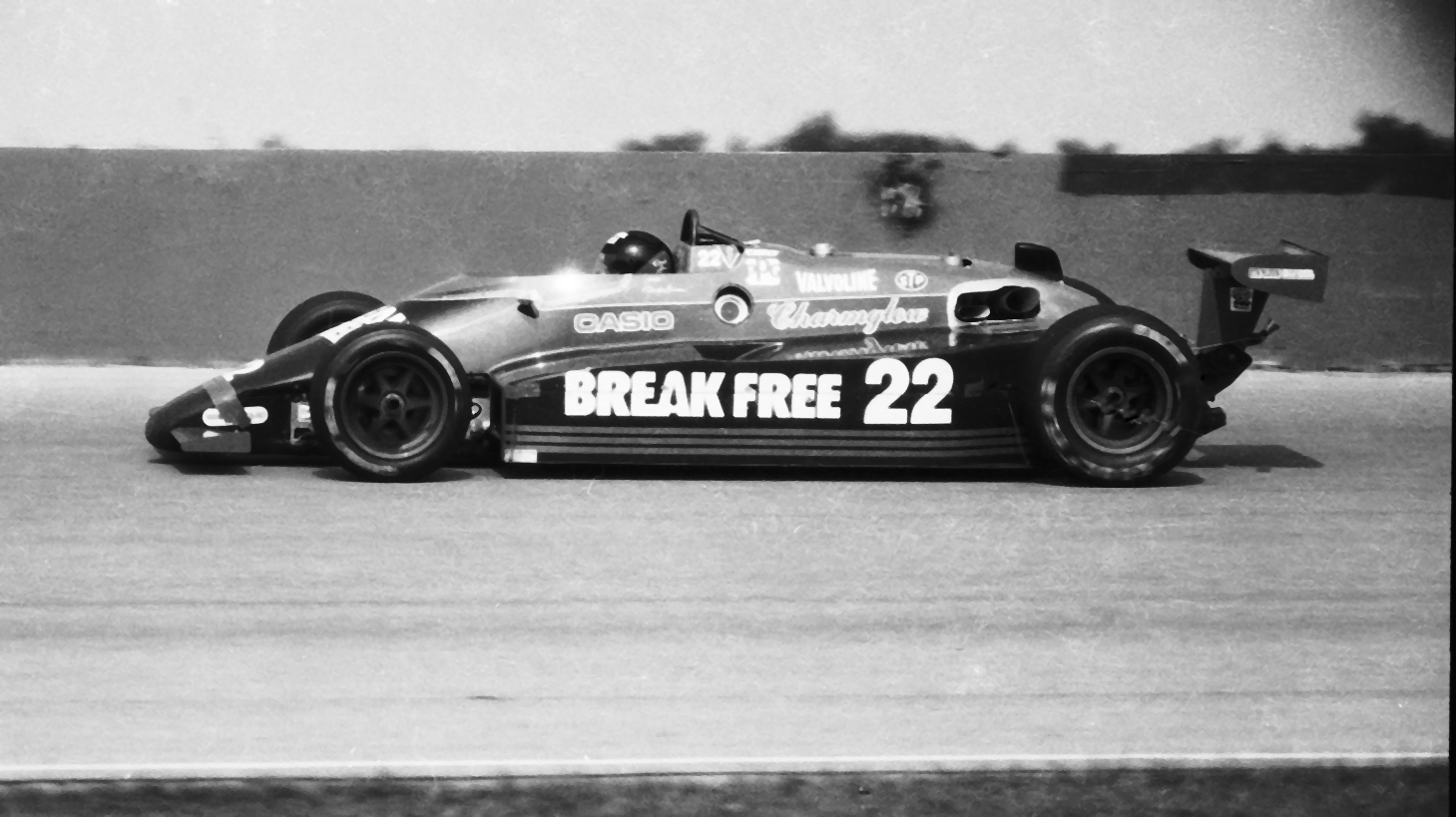
Simon's IndyCar at Pocono in 1984

In 1979, Simon sided with USAC during its split with CART. In being one of the few drivers to complete the USAC schedule, Simon finished eighth in the Championship. In 1980, Simon moved to CART and continued to have little success throughout the 1980s while remaining marginally competitive. In 1982, Simon captured national attention after walking away from a spectacular rollover accident at Riverside, an incident that was later showed on ABC's That's Incredible!. He logged his best CART season in 1987 when he made 11 starts and logged two top-tens including a sixth place at the Indy 500, good enough for 20th in the CART championship. A partial season in 1988 where Simon logged a solid ninth-place finish in the Indy 500 was his last as a driver.

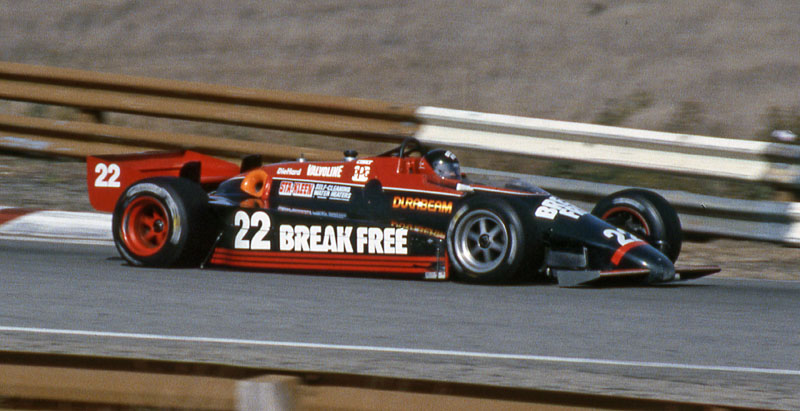
Dick Simon's March 84C at Laguna Seca in 1984.

Simon's driving career includes 183 starts (115 in USAC, 78 in CART) over 19 seasons spanning from 1970 to 1988. Among those starts are 17 Indianapolis 500 appearances. He completed 1,954 laps in the Indianapolis 500 without leading any, the second highest such total ever.

== Team ownership ==
Simon fielded his own race team beginning in 1983 and shortly thereafter began fielding cars for pay drivers, Dick Simon Racing being one of the most competitive teams offering race seats to such drivers almost always fielded current-year March and Lola chassis and had a competitive engine package. Simon himself retired from driving in 1988, one of the motivations being his difficulty in finding sponsors for himself as opposed to younger, up and coming drivers, saying in later that sponsors did not "want to sponsor somebody’s hobby, and that’s what they consider when an owner’s out there racing.” In 1989, the team fielded two fully funded drivers in Scott Brayton and Arie Luyendyk as the team moved towards the front of the pack. Simon fielded a car in the 1992 Indianapolis 500 for Lyn St. James who became the second woman to drive in the race. Raul Boesel finished fifth in points with three runner-up finishes in 1993, the team's best season result.

At 61 years old, Simon stepped behind the wheel of Davy Jones' car for shakedowns ahead of the 1995 Indianapolis 500, as Jones was in California for a NASCAR event. Overall, team had a difficult 1995 and Simon sold the team to Andy Evans who turned it into Team Scandia. Simon returned to ownership in the Indy Racing League IndyCar Series in 1999 but saw little success. The team was shut down after the team's driver Stéphan Grégoire failed to qualify for the 2001 Indianapolis 500.

== Personal life ==
Simon was an adventurist and enthusiast. He was an experienced skier, scuba diver, registered pilot, sky diver, and parachutist. He was a national champion parachute jumper, and made over 1,600 jumps during the 1960s. In 1970, he left a desk job at an insurance company to pursue a career in auto racing. Simon is married to Dianne. Simon was once questioned by the FBI under the suspicion of being the airplane hijacker D. B. Cooper. He proved that he was discussing sponsorship with the president of General Foods in Upstate New York on the date of the hijack.

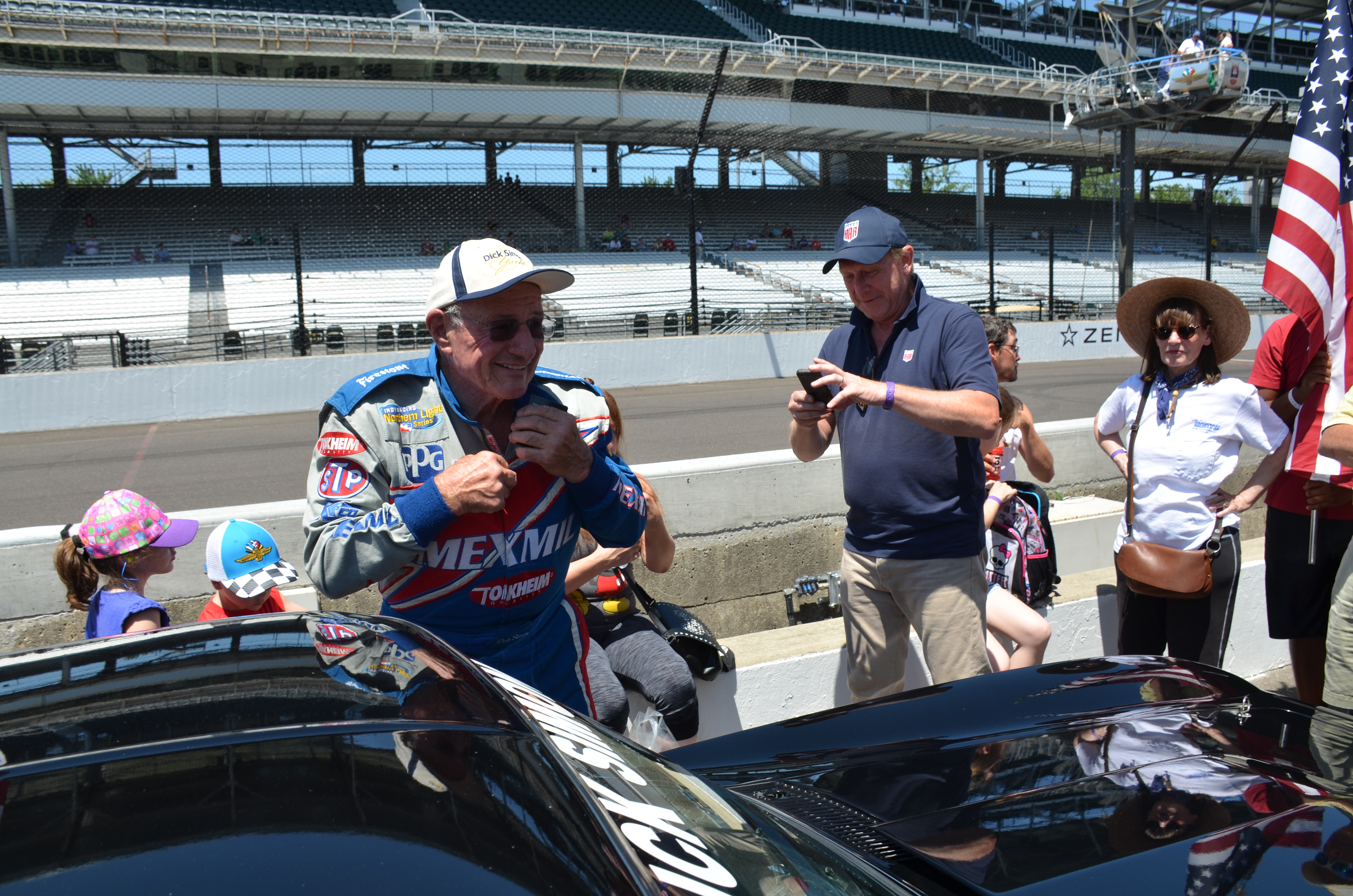
Dick Simon at the 2016 Brickyard SVRA Pro-Am race at the Indianapolis Motor Speedway.

== Motorsports career results ==
=== SCCA National Championship Runoffs ===
Year	Track	Car	Engine	Class	Finish	Start	Status
1968	Riverside Raceway	Chevrolet Corvette	Chevrolet	B Production	3		Running

=== American open-wheel racing ===
(key) (Races in bold indicate pole position)

==== USAC Championship Car ====
USAC Championship Car results
Year	Team	Chassis	Engine	1	2	3	4	5	6	7	8	9	10	11	12	13	14	15	16	17	18	19	20	21	22	23	24	Pos.	Pts
1969	Vollstedt Enterprises	Vollstedt 67	Ford 159ci V8t	PHX	HAN	INDY	MIL	LAN	PPR	CDR	NAZ	TRE	IRP	IRP	MIL	ISF	DOV	DSF	INF	BRN	BRN	TRE	SAC	SIR; DNS	SIR		RSD; DNS	NA	-
1969	Vollstedt Enterprises	Vollstedt 67	Chevrolet 320 ci V8																							PHX; DNQ		NA	-
1970	Racing International	Vollstedt 67	Ford 159ci V8t	PHX; 24		TRE; 9	INDY; 14	MIL; 11	LAN; 9		MCH; 19	IRP; 13	ISF	MIL	ONT; 3	DSF	INF	SED	TRE; DNQ		PHX; 9							10th	1080
1970	John Gregg	Vollstedt 65	Chevrolet 320 ci V8		SON; 6																							10th	1080
1970	Dayton-Walther	Morris 70	Ford 159ci V8t							CDR; 11																		10th	1080
1970	Ron Burke	Moore 65 D	Offy 252 ci																	SAC; DNQ								10th	1080
1971	Dick Simon Racing	Lola T152	Ford 159ci V8t	RAF; 13	RAF; 6	PHX; 12				POC; 17	MCH; 15	MIL		TRE; 25	PHX; 7													20th	405
1971	Dick Simon Racing	Vollstedt 67	Ford 159ci V8t				TRE; 7	INDY; 14	MIL; 9																			20th	405
1971	Dick Simon Racing	Peat-Lola	Ford 159ci V8t										ONT; 22															20th	405
1972	Dick Simon Racing	Peat-Lola	Ford 159ci V8t	PHX; 18	TRE; 14	INDY; 13	MIL; 9	MCH; 7	POC; 16			TRE; 16																23rd	200
1972	Dick Simon Racing	Lola T152	Foyt 159ci V8t							MIL; 12	ONT																	23rd	200
1972	Dick Simon Racing	Eagle 72	Foyt 159ci V8t										PHX; 14															23rd	200
1973	Dick Simon Racing	Eagle 72	Foyt 159ci V8t	TWS; 6	TRE; 10	TRE; 7	INDY; 14	MIL; 17	POC; 12		MIL; 22	ONT	ONT; 11	ONT; 22	MCH	MCH	TRE; 23											20th	440
1973	Eisenhour-Brayton Racing Team	Coyote 72	Foyt 159ci V8t							MCH; 17																		20th	440
1973	Patrick Racing	Eagle 73	Ford 159ci V8t															TWS; 21	PHX; 8									20th	440
1974	Dick Simon Racing	Eagle 72	Foyt 159ci V8t	ONT; 8	ONT	ONT; 28	PHX; 13	TRE	INDY; 33	MIL; 4	POC; 29	MCH; 21					PHX; 15											21st	270
1974	Vollstedt Enterprises	Vollstedt 73	Offy 159 ci t										MIL; 11	MCH	TRE	TRE												21st	270
1975	Dick Simon Racing	Eagle 72	Foyt 159ci V8t	ONT	ONT; 13	ONT; 24	PHX; 14	TRE; 8	INDY; 21	MIL; 13	POC; 23	MCH; 9	MIL; 17	MCH; 15	TRE; 11	PHX; 13												22nd	220
1976	Vollstedt Enterprises	Vollstedt 72/75	Offy 159 ci t	PHX; 7																								21st	330
1976	Dick Simon Racing	Eagle 72	Foyt 159ci V8t		TRE; 16		MIL; 14																					21st	330
1976	Vollstedt Enterprises	Vollstedt 73/76	Offy 159 ci t			INDY; 32		POC; 10	MCH; 19	TWS	TRE; 13	MIL; 16	ONT; 30	MCH; 21	TWS	PHX; 7												21st	330
1977	Vollstedt Enterprises	Vollstedt 73/76	Offy 159 ci t	ONT; 6	PHX; 7	TWS	TRE		MIL; 13					MIL; 9														24th	360
1977	Vollstedt Enterprises	Vollstedt 77	Offy 159 ci t					INDY; 31		POC; 16	MOS	MCH; 19	TWS; 14		ONT; 33	MCH												24th	360
1977	Vollstedt Enterprises	Lightning Mk1/76	Offy 159 ci t														PHX; 11											24th	360
1978	Vollstedt Enterprises	Vollstedt 77	Offy 159 ci t	PHX; 4	ONT; 6	TWS	TRE	INDY; 19	MOS		POC; 30	MCH; 13	ATL; 18	TWS; 6	MIL; 21	ONT; 14	MCH		SIL; 12	BRH; 7	PHX; 22							18th	670
1978	Vollstedt Enterprises	Vollstedt 73/76	Offy 159 ci t							MIL; 18								TRE; DNQ										18th	670
1979	Vollstedt Enterprises	Vollstedt 77	Offy 159 ci t	ONT; 7	TWS	INDY; 26	MIL; 13	POC; 5	TWS; 7	MIL; 17																		8th	766
1980	Vollstedt Enterprises	Vollstedt 77	Offy 159 ci t	ONT	INDY; 22	MIL; 13	POC; 21	MOH; DNQ																				38th	38
1981-82	Leader Card Racers	Watson PC7	Cosworth DFX V8t	INDY; DNQ	POC; 20	ISF	DSF	INF	INDY; DNQ																			40th	20
1982-83	Dick Simon Racing	March 83C	Cosworth DFX V8t	ISF	DSF	NAZ	INDY; 15																					23rd	25
1983-84	Dick Simon Racing	March 84C	Cosworth DFX V8t	DSF	INDY; 23																							26th	15

==== PPG Indy Car World Series ====
PPG Indy Car World Series results
Year	Team	Chassis	Engine	1	2	3	4	5	6	7	8	9	10	11	12	13	14	15	16	17	Pos.	Pts	Ref
1979	Vollstedt Enterprises	Vollstedt 77	Offy 159 ci t	PHX	ATL	ATL	INDY; 26	TRE	TRE	MCH	MCH	WGL	TRE	ONT	MCH	ATL	PHX				NC	0	
1980	Vollstedt Enterprises	Vollstedt 77	Offy 159 ci t	ONT	INDY; 22	MIL; 13	POC; 21	MOH; DNS	MCH; 18	WGL; 17	MIL; 7	ONT; 37	MCH	MEX; 23	PHX; 25						31st	185	
1981	Leader Card Racers	Watson PC7	Cosworth DFX V8t	PHX; 10	MIL; 7	ATL	ATL	MCH; 31	RIV; 6			WGL; 11	MEX; 25	PHX; 20							16th	38	
1981	Leader Card Racers	Watson 78	Offy 159 ci t							MIL; 22	MCH; 25										16th	38	
1982	Leader Card Racers	Watson PC7	Cosworth DFX V8t	PHX; DNQ	ATL; DNS	MIL; 19	CLE; 17	MCH; 21	MIL; 15	POC; 22	RIV; 7	ROA									25th	26	
1982	Leader Card Racers	Watson 82C	Cosworth DFX V8t										MCH; 13	PHX; 19							25th	26	
1983	Dick Simon Racing	March 83C	Cosworth DFX V8t	ATL; DNQ	INDY; 15	MIL; 11	CLE	MCH; 14					MCH; 19	CPL; 14	LAG	PHX; 23					29th	2	
1983	Dick Simon Racing	Eagle 83	Cosworth DFX V8t						ROA; 13	POC	RIV; 25	MOH; 15									29th	2	
1984	Dick Simon Racing	March 84C	Cosworth DFX V8t	LBH; 19	PHX; 4	INDY; 23	MIL; 13	POR; 20	MEA; 24	CLE; DNQ	MCH; 12	ROA; 15	POC; 12	MOH; 24	SAN; 12	MCH; 15	PHX; 21	LAG; 14	CPL; DNQ		26th	15	
1985	Dick Simon Racing	March 85C	Cosworth DFX V8t	LBH	INDY; 26	MIL; 13	POR	MEA; 17	CLE	MCH; 25	ROA	POC; 10	MOH	SAN; 17	MCH; 19	LAG	PHX; DNQ	MIA			37th	3	
1986	Dick Simon Racing	Lola T86/00	Cosworth DFX V8t	PHX	LBH	INDY; 14	MIL	POR	MEA	CLE; 22	TOR	MCH	POC; 23	MOH	SAN; 20	MCH	ROA	LAG	PHX	MIA	NC	0	
1987	Dick Simon Racing	Lola T87/00	Cosworth DFX V8t	LBH; 20	PHX; 10	INDY; 6	MIL; 20	POR; 18	MEA; 14	CLE; 23	TOR; 23	MCH; 9	POC; 21	ROA	MOH	NAZ; 18	LAG	MIA			21st	15	
1988	Dick Simon Racing	Lola T87/00	Cosworth DFX V8t	PHX; 19	LBH								POC; 19	MOH	ROA						24th	11	
1988	Dick Simon Racing	Lola T88/00	Cosworth DFX V8t			INDY; 9	MIL; 12	POR	CLE	TOR	MEA	MCH; 7				NAZ; 20	LAG	MIA			24th	11	

===== Indianapolis 500 =====
Year	Chassis	Engine	Start	Finish	Team
1970	Vollstedt	Ford	31	14	Racing International
1971	Vollstedt	Ford	33	14	Dick Simon Racing
1972	Peat-Lola	Ford	23	13	Dick Simon Racing
1973	Eagle	Foyt	27	14	Dick Simon Racing
1974	Eagle	Foyt	10	33	Dick Simon Racing
1975	Eagle	Foyt	30	21	Dick Simon Racing
1976	Vollstedt	Offenhauser	16	32	Vollstedt Enterprises
1977	Vollstedt	Offenhauser	30	31	Vollstedt Enterprises
1978	Vollstedt	Offenhauser	10	19	Vollstedt Enterprises
1979	Vollstedt	Offenhauser	20	26	Vollstedt Enterprises
1980	Vollstedt	Offenhauser	29	22	Vollstedt Enterprises
1981	Watson	Cosworth	DNQ		Leader Card Racers
1982	Watson	Cosworth	DNQ		Leader Card Racers
1983	March	Cosworth	20	15	Dick Simon Racing
1984	March	Cosworth	20	23	Dick Simon Racing
1985	March	Cosworth	14	26	Dick Simon Racing
1986	Lola	Cosworth	33	14	Dick Simon Racing
1987	Lola	Cosworth	6	6	Dick Simon Racing
1988	Lola	Cosworth	16	9	Dick Simon Racing

=== NASCAR ===
(key) (Bold - Pole position awarded by qualifying time. Italics - Pole position earned by points standings or practice time. * – Most laps led.)

==== Winston Cup Series ====
NASCAR Winston Cup Series results
Year	Team	No.	Make	1	2	3	4	5	6	7	8	9	10	11	12	13	14	15	16	17	18	19	20	21	22	23	24	25	26	27	28	29	30	NWCC	Pts	Ref
1973	Faustina Racing	5	Dodge	RSD	DAY	RCH	CAR	BRI	ATL	NWS	DAR	MAR	TAL; 7	NSV	CLT	DOV	TWS	RSD	MCH	DAY; 35	BRI	ATL	TAL	NSV	DAR	RCH	DOV	NWS	MAR	CLT	CAR			NA	0	
1974	Faustina Racing	5	Dodge	RSD	DAY; 31	RCH	CAR	BRI	ATL	DAR	NWS	MAR	TAL	NSV	DOV	CLT	RSD	MCH	DAY	BRI	NSV	ATL	POC	TAL	MCH	DAR	RCH	DOV	NWS	MAR	CLT	CAR	ONT	NA	0	

===== Daytona 500 =====
Year	Team	Manufacturer	Start	Finish
1974	Faustina Racing	Dodge	37	31
