= March 81C =

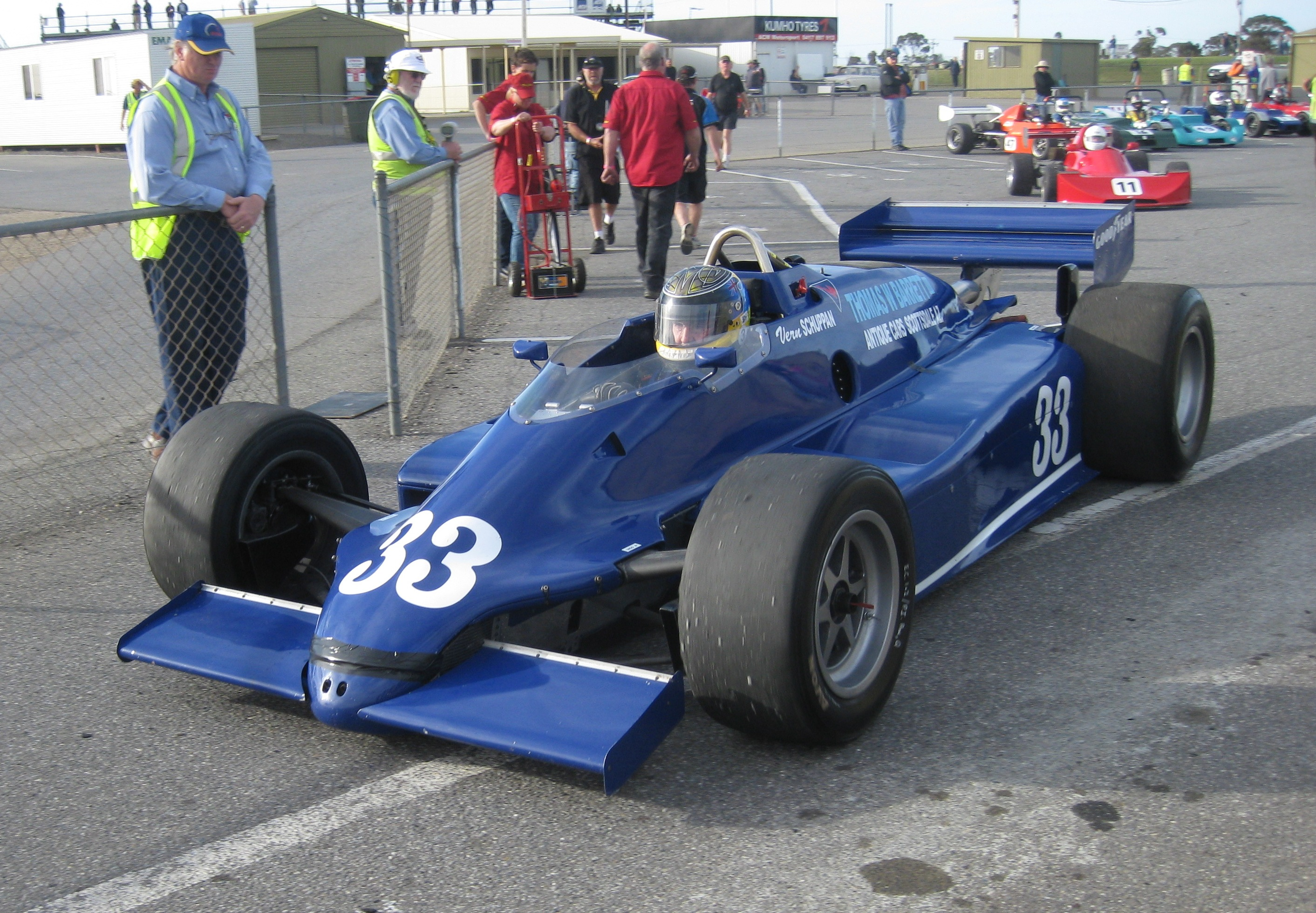
1981 March 81C IndyCar chassis

The March 81C is an open-wheel race car, designed by and built by March Engineering, to compete in the 1981 IndyCar season. It was March's first successful IndyCar chassis. The March 81C chassis won two out of the eleven races that season, and scored one pole position, all with Tom Sneva. It was powered by the 840 hp (630 kW) Ford-Cosworth DFX turbo V8 engine.
