= Chris Kneifel =

American racing driver

Christopher Scott "Chris" Kneifel (born April 23, 1961, in Chicago, Illinois) is a former racing driver in the CART Championship Car series. He raced in the 1982–1984 seasons and made 19 career starts, including at the Indianapolis 500 in 1983 and 1984. He finished in the top-ten six times, with a best of eighth place on three occasions. He was the last driver to start the Indianapolis 500 with a qualifying speed under 200 miles per hour (320 km/h). In 1984, Jacques Villeneuve originally qualified for the final starting position at just over 200 mph (320 km/h), but withdrew after being injured in a practice crash. Kneifel, the next fastest car at just under 200 mph (320 km/h), started in his place.

Earlier in his career, Kneifel raced in the Formula Ford and Formula Atlantic Series. After CART, he was the 1985 Trans-Am Rookie of the Year. He later transitioned to American Le Mans Series endurance racing. He capped his career by teaming with Ron Fellows, Frank Freon, and Johnny O'Connell to win the 2001 24 Hours of Daytona. From 2001 to 2004, he served as the Chief Steward (Race Director) for CART.

Standing at 6 feet 6 inches (2 meters), Kneifel was one of the tallest racing drivers in IndyCar racing history.

== Racing record ==
=== SCCA National Championship Runoffs ===
Year	Track	Car	Engine	Class	Finish	Start	Status
1981	Road Atlanta	Tiga FF80	Ford	Formula Ford	18		Running

=== 24 Hours of Le Mans results ===
Year	Team	Co-Drivers	Car	Class	Laps	Pos.	Class Pos.
2000	(United States) Corvette Racing	(Canada) Ron Fellows (United Kingdom) Justin Bell	Chevrolet Corvette C5-R	GTS	326	11th	4th
