= 1978 Pocono 500 =

(United States) 1978 Pocono 500
Race details
- 8th round of the 1978 USAC Championship Car season
- Date: June 25, 1978
- Official name: 1978 Schaefer 500
- Location: Long Pond, Pennsylvania
- Course: Permanent racing facility 2.5 mi / 4.023 km
- Distance: 200 laps 500 mi / 804.672 km
- Weather: Temperatures up to 80 °F (27 °C); wind speeds up to 12 miles per hour (19 km/h)

Pole position
- Driver: (United States) Danny Ongais (Ted Field)

Podium
- First: (United States) Al Unser (Chaparral Cars)
- Second: (United States) Johnny Rutherford (McLaren)
- Third: (United States) Tom Sneva (Team Penske)

The 1978 Pocono 500, the 8th running of the event, was held at the Pocono Raceway in Long Pond, Pennsylvania, on Sunday, June 25, 1978. Branded as the 1978 Schaefer 500 for sponsorship reasons, the race was won by Al Unser who one month earlier had won the Indianapolis 500. Two months later, Unser won the California 500 to become the only driver to win all three of IndyCar's Triple Crown of 500 mile races in the same year.

== Practice ==
A major bump in turn two, "The Tunnel Turn," formed where a new asphalt patch met the old asphalt. On Tuesday night, former Indianapolis track superintendent, Clarence Cagle, oversaw a cement dust veneer meant to smooth the transition. An early morning rain caused the cement to be very slick in Wednesday's practice, which forced practice to be stopped for the cement to be scraped off. The bump was blamed for a suspension failure on Gordon Johncock's car which caused a minor crash.

Criticism from drivers abounded that the repairs did nothing and the bumps were worse than they ever were. Referring to Pocono's past history as a spinach farm, Pancho Carter caused controversy when he said "this country lost a lot when they took the spinach out of here. That second turn is so bad, they're probably growing spinach in there. It's like going down an expressway and you hit a two-inch overlay. The car just goes up in the air." This angered Clarence Cagle, who oversaw repaving of the turn six weeks before the race. "I'm insulted and I guarantee in the next 24 hours I'll have a talk with him... If I thought the track was that dangerous, I'd close this place down in a minute."

On Wednesday night after practice, Cagle and the track crew went to work to further smooth the bump.

== Time Trials ==
Day one of qualifying was held on Thursday. Danny Ongais posted a two lap average of 190.315 mph to win the pole. He was joined on the front row by Tom Sneva and Johnny Rutherford. Formula One points leader Mario Andretti posted the sixth fastest time. Sheldon Kinser hit the wall and suffered damage to the right front. His car was repaired to qualify on day two. Larry Rice crashed and withdrew from the race when his car could not be repaired.

26 cars qualified for the race on day one. On day two, only four cars completed qualifying runs. Officials faced the possibility of having the first 500-mile race since 1928 with less than a full field of 33 cars. Qualifying was extended an extra 30 minutes past the 6:00 p.m. deadline to give an opportunity for small teams with mechanical problems to prepare their cars for an attempt. None of the cars were able to make an attempt. Of the four cars still at the track, but unable to make a run, a random draw was held to see which three would be invited to start the race. Bill Vukovich II, Phil Threshie, and Lee Kunzman won the draw to start the race. Bob Harkey was the lone car to miss the field. Kunzman's car was described as having "such bad problems in the front, it won't even go down the track straight at 165 mph." In Sunday's race, Kunzman completed one lap before parking the car.

Prior to the race, USAC President, Dick King, said that Pocono Raceway would have to repair the track surface in turn two before Indy cars would return. Winter freezing above the tunnels caused major bumps that worsened each year. The track's construction of dirt piled over the steel infield tunnels caused the track surface to settle and some believed the construction instead should be done with concrete.

== Race ==
Polesitter, Danny Ongais drove away from the field at the start and led the first 15 laps.

On lap 7, Bill Vukovich II spun and hit the wall in turn two when his wing broke. He was able to continue after repairs were made. On lap 13, Steve Krisiloff and George Snider spun in turn three and hit the wall. Krisiloff was done for the day. Ongais pitted under caution, which gave the lead to A.J. Foyt for two laps, and then to Tom Sneva. Ongais retook the lead on lap 26, and led until making a pitstop on lap 39, under caution when Gary Bettenhausen stalled on track.

On lap 54, Mario Andretti passed Foyt to lead one lap, extending his streak of leading at least one lap in every Pocono 500 since 1972. Andretti fell out of the race on lap 73 with a broken gearbox.

The most serious accident occurred on lap 59. Tom Bagley spun in turn one. Blinded by smoke, Jim McElreath hit Bagley in the left-front. Neither driver was injured. Debris from the crash damaged the nose of Tom Sneva's car.

Running a close second behind Gordon Johncock on lap 74, Mario Andretti fell out of the race with a broken gearbox. On lap 75, Al Unser passed Johncock to take the lead for the first time.

49 of the first 113 laps were run under caution. The final 87 laps were run without caution.

Ongais led for a total of 59 laps, and was leading on lap 130 when a broken gearbox knocked him out of the race.

Rutherford pitted from the lead on lap 161. He returned to the pits three laps later thinking he had a tire going flat.

Rutherford cycled back to the lead when Unser made his final pit stop on lap 179. Unser regained the lead with 10 laps remaining when Rutherford made his final pit stop.

On lap 198, Rutherford moved inside of the lapped car of Wally Dallenbach in turn three and the two cars touched wheels. Rutherford then passed defending Pocono 500 winner, Tom Sneva, in turn one to take second place. Sneva's car then began to sputter out of fuel and he coasted to the finish in third.

Unser's margin of victory was 24.5 seconds and he was able to go all 500 miles without changing tires. He earned $89,046 in prize money. It was Unser's third consecutive 500 mile race win; he had previously won the 1977 California 500 and the 1978 Indianapolis 500. Unser went on to win the 1978 California 500 in September to become the only man to ever win all three of IndyCar's Triple Crown races in one year.

== Box score ==
Finish	Grid	No	Name	Entrant	Chassis	Engine	Laps	Time/Status	Led	Points
1	10	2	(United States) Al Unser	Chaparral Racing	Lola T500	Cosworth DFX	200	3:30:52.780	65	1000
2	3	4	(United States) Johnny Rutherford	Team McLaren	McLaren M24B	Cosworth DFX	200	+24.5	20	800
3	2	1	(United States) Tom Sneva	Penske Racing	Penske PC-6	Cosworth DFX	200	Running	10	700
4	12	6	(United States) Wally Dallenbach	Jerry O'Connell Racing	McLaren M24	Cosworth DFX	198	Flagged	0	600
5	14	80	(United States) Larry Dickson	RP Racing	Penske PC-5	Cosworth DFX	196	Cylinder head	10	500
6	16	84	(United States) George Snider	A. J. Foyt Enterprises	Coyote	Foyt	196	Flagged	0	400
7	22	78	(United States) Mike Mosley	Alex Morales Motorsports	Lightning	Offenhauser	193	Flagged	0	300
8	4	14	(United States) A. J. Foyt	A. J. Foyt Enterprises	Coyote	Foyt	190	Engine	20	250
9	29	92	(United States) Al Loquasto	Vatis Enterprises	Eagle	Offenhauser	189	Flagged	0	200
10	9	8	(United States) Pancho Carter	Fletcher Racing Team	Lightning	Cosworth DFX	188	Gearbox	0	150
11	23	85	(United States) Larry Cannon	Fiore Racing	Wildcat Mk1	Offenhauser	188	Engine	0	100
12	27	24	(United States) Sheldon Kinser	Leader Card Racers	Watson	Offenhauser	185	Flagged	0	50
13	8	77	(United States) Salt Walther	Dayton-Walther	McLaren M24	Cosworth DFX	175	Transmission	0	25
14	5	20	(United States) Gordon Johncock	Patrick Racing	Wildcat Mk2	DGS	165	Piston	15	25
15	18	43	(United States) Tom Bigelow	Armstrong Mould Racing Team	Wildcat	DGS	161	Flagged	0	25
16	24	30	(United States) Jerry Sneva	Thunder Racing	McLaren M16B	Offenhauser	159	Turbocharger	0	25
17	19	29	(Canada) Cliff Hucul	Longhorn Racing	McLaren M16D	Offenhauser	158	Fuel pump	0	20
18	28	38	(United States) Jerry Karl	Bentzel Construction	McLaren M16B	Offenhauser	149	Engine	0	20
19	1	25	(United States) Danny Ongais	Interscope Racing	Parnelli VPJ6B	Cosworth DFX	130	Transmission	59	20
20	7	48	(United States) Bobby Unser	All American Racers	Eagle	Cosworth DFX	116	Suspension	0	20
21	17	69	(United States) Joe Saldana	Hoffman Racing	Eagle 73	Offenhauser	112	Valve	0	15
22	11	16	(United States) Johnny Parsons	Lindsey Hopkins Racing	Lightning	Offenhauser	83	Overheating	0	15
23	6	7	(United States) Mario Andretti	Penske Racing	Penske PC-6	Cosworth DFX	73	Gearbox	1	15
24	32	87	(United States) Phil Threshie	Fiore Racing	Lightning	Offenhauser	63	Engine	0	15
25	25	26	(United States) Jim McElreath	McElreath Racing	Eagle 74	Offenhauser	58	Crash	0	10
26	15	22	(United States) Tom Bagley	Leader Card Racers	Watson	Offenhauser	55	Crash	0	10
27	26	18	(United States) Bubby Jones	Longhorn Racing	Wildcat Mk2	DGS	52	Turbocharger	0	10
28	31	81	(United States) Bill Vukovich II	Wayne Woodward	Eagle	Offenhauser	52	Piston	0	10
29	30	98	(United States) Gary Bettenhausen	J. C. Agajanian	King	Offenhauser	46	Stalled	0	5
30	21	17	(United States) Dick Simon	Vollstedt Enterprises	Vollstedt	Offenhauser	36	Piston	0	5
31	20	19	(United States) Spike Gehlhausen	Carl Gehlhausen	Eagle 74	Offenhauser	34	Valve	0	5
32	13	40	(United States) Steve Krisiloff	Patrick Racing	Wildcat Mk2	DGS	13	Crash	0	5
33	33	90	(United States) Lee Kunzman	Art Sugai	Sugai Fox	Offenhauser	1	Oil pressure	0	5
