= 1979 SCCA/CART Indy Car Series =

American motorsport season

1979 CART season
- SCCA/CART Indy Car Series
- 1979 IndyCar season

Season
- Races: 14
- Start date: March 11
- End date: October 20

Awards
- Drivers' champion: (United States) Rick Mears
- Constructors' Cup: (United States) Penske PC-6 (United States) Penske PC-7
- Manufacturers' Cup: (United Kingdom) Cosworth DFX
- Nations' Cup: United States
- Rookie of the Year: (United States) Bill Alsup
- Indianapolis 500 winner: (United States) Rick Mears

The 1979 SCCA/CART Indy Car Series was the inaugural Championship Auto Racing Teams (CART) American open wheel racing championship series. The season consisted of 14 races. Rick Mears was the national champion, and the rookie of the year was Bill Alsup. The 1979 Indianapolis 500 was sanctioned by USAC, but counted towards the CART points championship. Rick Mears won the Indy 500, his first of four victories in the event.

== Controversy ==
The 1979 season was filled with controversy on and off the track. During the offseason, several Indy car owners broke off from USAC, and formed Championship Auto Racing Teams, a new sanctioning body to govern the sport of open wheel Indy car racing. USAC continued to sanction their Gold Crown Championship, resulting in two parallel national championships for 1979. The controversy over the first "split" in Indy car racing came to its first climax at the 1979 Indianapolis 500, when USAC rejected entries by certain CART owners. The owners won a court injunction to be allowed to race, and later, another controversy erupted, this time involving illegal wastegate exhaust pipes.

The 1979 CART season was held through an arrangement such that it fell under the sanctioning umbrella of the Sports Car Club of America (SCCA). This one-year, temporary arrangement was such that it would be formally recognized by ACCUS.

With three wins, two poles, and 14 top tens (no finish worse than 7th), Rick Mears ran away with the inaugural CART championship title. Mears took a large points lead after winning the Indy 500, and never relinquished the top spot through the remainder of the season. Bobby Unser won six races, and finished second in points.

== USAC/CART "Split" ==
For more information, see 1979 Indianapolis 500 § Controversies

== Confirmed entries ==
The following teams and drivers competed for the 1979 CART World Series.

Team/Car Owner	Chassis	Engine	No	Drivers	Races
(United States) Alex Morales Co.	Lightning Mk1/77	Offenhauser	10	(United States) Pancho Carter	All
(United States) Alex Morales Co.	Lightning Mk1/77	Offenhauser	15	(United States) Bob Harkey	11 (Note: Ineligible to score points: driver affiliated to USAC.)
(United States) All American Racers	Eagle 78 MkII	Cosworth	36	(United States) Mike Mosley	All
(United States) Beith Racing	Eagle 72	Offenhauser	28	(United States) Billy Scott	4, 11
(United States) Cannon Racing Team	Wildcat Mk. I	DGS	95	(United States) Larry Cannon	4, 7–8, 10–14
(United States) Chaparral Racing	Chaparral 2K; Lola T500 (Note: Used by Unser at the Phoenix spring race, the Atlanta Twin 125 and the Trenton 150, and by Firestone.)	Cosworth	2	(United States) Al Unser	All
(United States) Chaparral Racing	Chaparral 2K; Lola T500	Cosworth	86	(Australia) Dennis Firestone	11
(United States) Conqueste Racing	Parnelli VPJ6CT	Cosworth	21 (Note: Raced as #89 at the Indianapolis 500)	(United States) Lee Kunzman	1–8, 11
(United States) Fletcher Racing	Lightning Mk1/77	Cosworth	7	(United States) Steve Krisiloff	1–10
(United States) Fletcher Racing	Lightning Mk1/77	Cosworth	55	(United States) Spike Gehlhausen	11–14
(United States) Frantz Auto Body	Wildcat Mk. I	DGS	18 (Note: Raced as #16 at the Indianapolis 500)	(United States) Tom Frantz	1–4, 7-12
(United States) Frantz Auto Body	Wildcat Mk. I	DGS	18	(United States) Bill Henderson	5–6
(United States) Gehlhausen-Reath Racing	Eagle 74; Wildcat Mk. I (Note: Car loaned by Patrick Racing at the Indy 500 for Gehlhausen.)	Offenhauser; Cosworth	19 (Note: Gehlhausen was bumped from the Indy 500 field and loaned the #90 car from Patrick Racing, which he qualified. Later, the #19 was allowed to requalify in a special session, but it also failed to qualify with other drivers. For race day, the #90 was renumbered as #19.)	(United States) Spike Gehlhausen	1–10
(United States) Gehlhausen-Reath Racing	Eagle 74; Wildcat Mk. I	Offenhauser; Cosworth	19	(United States) Bob Harkey	4
(United States) Gehlhausen-Reath Racing	Eagle 74; Wildcat Mk. I	Offenhauser; Cosworth	19	(United States) Bill Alsup	4
(United States) Gehlhausen-Reath Racing	Eagle 74; Wildcat Mk. I	Offenhauser; Cosworth	19	(United States) Phil Caliva	11
(United States) Gehlhausen-Reath Racing	Eagle 74; Wildcat Mk. I	Offenhauser; Cosworth	39	(United States) Al Loquasto	4, 7–8
(United States) Hoffman Auto Racing	Lightning Mk1/77	Offenhauser	59	(United States) George Snider	4
(United States) Hoffman Auto Racing	Lightning Mk1/77	Offenhauser	59	(United States) Joe Saldana	7–8, 11
(United States) Hoffman Auto Racing	Eagle; Lightning Mk1/77 (Note: Used at the Trenton Twin and the Michigan Grand Prix.)	Offenhauser	69	(United States) Joe Saldana	1–6, 9–10, 12
(United States) Hoffman Auto Racing	Eagle; Lightning Mk1/77	Offenhauser	69	(United States) Tim Richmond	7–8
(United States) Hoffman Auto Racing	Eagle; Lightning Mk1/77	Offenhauser	69	(United States) Al Loquasto	11
(United States) Hoffman Auto Racing	Spyder Eagle	Offenhauser	79	(United States) Dick Ferguson	7–8
(United States) Hoffman Auto Racing	Spyder Eagle	Offenhauser	79	(Canada) Cliff Hucul	11
(United States) Hoffman Auto Racing	Spyder Eagle	Offenhauser	79	(United States) Joe Saldana	13–14
(United States) Intercomp Racing	Eagle 72	Offenhauser	92	(United States) John Mahler	1–9
(United States) Interscope Racing	Parnelli VPJ6CT; Parnelli VPJ6B (Note: Used at Watkins Glen and the Trenton 150.)	Cosworth	25	(United States) Danny Ongais	All
(United States) Jerry O'Connell Racing	McLaren M24	Cosworth	1	(United States) Tom Sneva	All
(United States) Jerry O'Connell Racing	McLaren M24B	Cosworth	32	(United States) Johnny Parsons	11
(United States) Longhorn Racing	Penske PC-6/78	Cosworth	11	(United States) Tom Bagley	All
(United States) Longhorn Racing	Penske PC-6/78	Cosworth	71	(United States) Steve Krisiloff	11
(United States) Mergard Racing (Note: Switched USAC allegiance for CART membership during the year.)	Eagle 72	Offenhauser	42	(United States) Herm Johnson	13–14
(United States) Patrick Racing	Penske PC-6/78; Wildcat Mk. V (Note: Used by Dallenbach at the Phoenix spring race, the Atlanta Twin and Watkins Glen.)	Cosworth	20 (Note: Raced as #3 at the Indianapolis 500.)	(United States) Gordon Johncock	All
(United States) Patrick Racing	Penske PC-6/78; Wildcat Mk. V	Cosworth	40 (Note: Raced as #6 at the Indianapolis 500.)	(United States) Wally Dallenbach	All
(United States) Patrick Racing	Penske PC-6/78; Wildcat Mk. V	Cosworth	60	(United States) Roger Mears	11
(United States) Patrick Racing	Penske PC-6/78; Wildcat Mk. V	Cosworth	60	(United States) Steve Krisiloff	12
(United States) Penske Racing	Penske PC-7/79; Penske PC-6/78 (Note: Used by Mears at the Indy 500, the Trenton Twin and Watkins Glen.)	Cosworth	9	(United States) Rick Mears	All
(United States) Penske Racing	Penske PC-7/79; Penske PC-6/78	Cosworth	12	(United States) Bobby Unser	All
(United States) Penske Racing	Penske PC-7/79; Penske PC-6/78	Cosworth	68	(United States) Bill Alsup	4 (Note: Alsup switched to Gehlhausen-Reath at the special qualifying session for bumped cars at the Indy 500, after his Penske ride was disqualified for a technical infringement.)
(United States) Penske Racing	Penske PC-7/79; Penske PC-6/78	Cosworth	99	(United States) Mario Andretti	11–12
(United States) Sanett Racing	Penske PC-6/78	Cosworth	23	(United States) Dick Ferguson	11, 14
(United States) S&M Electric	Lightning Mk1/77	Offenhauser	35 (Note: Raced as #31 at the Indianapolis 500.)	(United States) Larry Rice	1–6
(United States) S&M Electric	Lightning Mk1/77	Offenhauser	35	(United States) Tim Richmond	9–11, 14
(United States) Team McLaren	McLaren M24B; McLaren M24 (Note: Used by Rutherford at Watkins Glen, and by Whittington.)	Cosworth	4	(United States) Johnny Rutherford	All
(United States) Team McLaren	McLaren M24B; McLaren M24	Cosworth	94	(United States) Don Whittington	11 (Note: Ineligible to score points)
(United States) Walmotor	Penske PC-6/78; McLaren M24 (Note: Used at the Phoenix spring race and the Trenton Twin.)	Cosworth	77	(United States) Salt Walther	1–4, 7–8, 11–12
(United States) WASP Racing	McLaren M16C/D	Offenhauser	41	(United States) Bill Alsup	All (Note: Alsup switched to a Penske Racing back-up car for Bump Day at the Indy 500.)
(United States) Whittington Bros. Racing	Parnelli VPJ6CT	Cosworth	98	(United States) Bill Whittington	11
(United States) Wysard Motor Co.	Wildcat Mk. II	DGS	34	(Australia) Vern Schuppan	1–4, 7–12, 14
USAC-registered teams
(United States) Agajanian-King Racers	Kingfish 73	Chevrolet	97	(United States) Phil Threshie	4
(United States) Agajanian-King Racers	Kingfish 73	Chevrolet	98	(United States) Gary Bettenhausen	4
(United States) AMI Racing	Lola T500B	Cosworth	44	(United States) Tom Bigelow	4
(United States) AMI Racing	Lola T500B	Cosworth	45	(United States) Janet Guthrie	4
(United States) AMI Racing	Wildcat Mk. II	DGS	46	(United States) Howdy Holmes	4
(Canada) B/M Enterprises	Antares 72	Offenhauser	50	(Canada) Frank Weiss	4, 13
(Canada) B/M Enterprises	Antares 72	Offenhauser	50	(Canada) Eldon Rasmussen	4
(United States) Beaudoin Racing	Wildcat Mk. II	DGS	83	(United States) Billy Engelhart	4
(United States) Bruce Crower	Eagle 74	Chevrolet	57	(United States) Jerry Sneva	4 (Note: Jerry Sneva switched to Hodgdon Racing for the second weekend of Indy 500 time trials.)
(United States) Gibson Racing	Eagle 74	DGS	75	(United States) Todd Gibson	4
(United States) Gilmore Racing	Parnelli VPJ6CT	Cosworth	14	(United States) A. J. Foyt	4
(United States) Hodgdon Racing	Spirit 78	AMC	73	(United States) Neil Bonnett	4
(United States) Hodgdon Racing	Spirit 78	AMC	73	(United States) Jerry Sneva	4
(United States) Hodgdon Racing	McLaren M24	Cosworth	72	(United States) Jerry Sneva	11 (Note: Eligible to score points after Hodgdon Racing switched allegiances to CART.)
(United States) Hodgdon Racing	McLaren M24	Cosworth	72	(United States) Roger McCluskey	4
(Canada) Hucul Racing	McLaren M16E	Offenhauser	29	(Canada) Cliff Hucul	4
(United States) Jim Hurtubise	Mallard 71	Offenhauser	56	(United States) Jim Hurtubise	4
(United States) Leader Card Racing	Watson 77	Offenhauser	22	(United States) Bill Vukovich II	4
(United States) Leader Card Racing	Watson 78	Offenhauser	24	(United States) Sheldon Kinser	4
(United States) Leader Card Racing	Watson 79	Offenhauser	40	(United States) George Snider	4 (Note: Snider switched to Hoffman Auto Racing for a special qualifying session for bumped cars at the Indy 500, after the #40 was withdrawn due to a blown engine.)
(United States) Lindsey Hopkins	Lightning X-15	Offenhauser	15	(United States) Johnny Parsons	4
(United States) Lindsey Hopkins	Lightning Mk1/79	Offenhauser	51	(United States) Hurley Haywood	4
(United States) McElreath Racing	Penske PC-6/78	Cosworth	23	(United States) Jim McElreath	4
(United States) Medlin Racing	Cicada Mk.IV	Offenhauser	35	(United States) Bill Puterbaugh	4
(United States) Polak Racing	Penske PC-5/77	Cosworth	80	(United States) Larry Dickson	4
(United States) Rager Racing	Eagle 68	Chevrolet	66	(United States) Roger Rager	4
(Canada) Rasmussen Racing	Rascar 72	Foyt	58	(Canada) Eldon Rasmussen	4 (Note: Rasmussen switched to B/M Enterprises after a crash during Indy 500 practice.)
(United States) Raymond Reimer	March 73A	Chevrolet	93	(United States) Larry McCoy	4
(United States) Rhoades Competition	McLaren M16E	Offenhauser	20 (Note: Raced as #30 at the California 500.)	(United States) John Martin	4, 11
(United States) Thunder Racing	McLaren M16C/D	Offenhauser	30	(United States) Dana Carter	4
(United States) Vollstedt Racing	Vollstedt 77	Offenhauser	17	(United States) Dick Simon	4
(United States) Wayne Woodward	Eagle 74	Offenhauser	81	(United States) Dick Ferguson (Note: Jan Opperman took some laps for his refresher test at the Indy 500.)	4
(United States) William R. Compton	McLaren M16C/D	Offenhauser	38	(United States) Jerry Karl	4

== Schedule ==
CART announced its first 8-race schedule on January 6, 1979. An updated schedule was published on January 31, 1979, and further additions over the following months increased the season to 14 races.

Icon	Legend
O	Oval/Speedway
R	Road course

Rd	Date	Name	Circuit	Location
1	March 11	Arizona Republic/Jimmy Bryan 150	O Phoenix International Raceway	Avondale, Arizona
2	April 22	Gould Twin Dixie 125	O Atlanta International Raceway	Hampton, Georgia
3	April 22	Gould Twin Dixie 125	O Atlanta International Raceway	Hampton, Georgia
4	May 27	Indianapolis 500	O Indianapolis Motor Speedway	Indianapolis, Indiana
5	June 10	Trenton Twin Indy	O Trenton Speedway	Trenton, New Jersey
6	June 10	Trenton Twin Indy	O Trenton Speedway	Trenton, New Jersey
7	July 15	Norton Twin 125	O Michigan International Speedway	Brooklyn, Michigan
8	July 15	Norton Twin 125	O Michigan International Speedway	Brooklyn, Michigan
9	August 5 (Note: Originally scheduled for August 19 before being scratched and subsequently restored to the schedule.)	Kent Oil 150	R Watkins Glen International	Watkins Glen, New York
10	August 19 (Note: The race was originally scheduled on Sunday, August 12, before being postponed to Saturday, August 18 due to excessive rainfall. On that date, the race was postponed again to Sunday, August 19 for the same reason.)	Ditzler 150	O Trenton Speedway	Trenton, New Jersey
11	September 2	California 500	O Ontario Motor Speedway	Ontario, California
12	September 15	Gould Grand Prix	O Michigan International Speedway	Brooklyn, Michigan
13	September 30	Rich's Atlanta Classic	O Atlanta International Raceway	Hampton, Georgia
14	October 20	Miller High Life 150	O Phoenix International Raceway	Avondale, Arizona

=== Cancelled events ===
Race name	Track	City	Original date
Molson Diamond Indy	R Mosport Park	Bowmanville, Ontario	July 29
Unnamed event	O North Carolina Motor Speedway	Rockingham, North Carolina	August 26

=== Schedule changes ===
A tentative 11-race schedule provided to the media in early December 1978 included two Milwaukee Mile races and the 500-mile contests at Ontario and Pocono 500, all of which were later bound to the USAC schedule published at the end of the month. Plans were in motion for the season finale to be held in October 27 on a 1-mile road course in Honolulu, Hawaii, pending an inspection, but nothing came out of it.

The initial 8-race schedule included the traditional two dates at both Michigan International Speedway and Phoenix International Raceway, owned by CART founders Roger Penske and Bob Fletcher. A deal with Atlanta International Raceway was also reached, including the spring date that was also being targeted by USAC despite a date conflict with Trenton Speedway, and a second date in September that had not been featured in the tentative schedule. The Molson Diamond Indy at Mosport also switched allegiances to CART, with the Road Atlanta track having been a back-up option for the same date, and a new event was scheduled at the North Carolina Motor Speedway in Rockingham, which had never hosted Indy cars before. Both events were set to tentative dates, with a full deal yet to be established at the time.

On January 23, Trenton announced that both of its races would move from USAC sanctioning to CART after being leased by Roger Penske. However, its original dates, April 22 and September 23, needed to be changed due to conflicts with other events. On January 30, the 200-mile summer race at Michigan was converted to a Twin 125 format with two separate races due to a TV deal with NBC, which would only broadcast the first leg. One day later, in a schedule update, the finalized deal with Atlanta also turned its first 150-miler into two 125-mile races, while the new Trenton dates were fixed for June 10 and August 12. The Mosport race was scrapped by the organizers because of the uncertainty regarding the CART/USAC split, and was replaced by a new date at Watkins Glen International on August 19.

On March 15, with the season already underway, the planned debut at Rockingham was cancelled by the organizers because of a lack of sponsorship and TV deals for the race. On May 17, it was announced that the Trenton 200 would be split into two 100-mile races, being the third event to adopt a Twin format. In the same date, Watkins Glen announced that the deal with CART had '"dissolved", without delving finto specifics. Negotiations between both parties resumed shortly after, and a new deal was announced on July 8, with the race now scheduled to be held on August 5.

While not featured in any schedule prior to the event, CART awarded points for its affiliated teams and drivers at the Indianapolis 500 upon its participation. On July 3, Ontario Motor Speedway announced that the California 500 would also move to CART to guarantee participation from top drivers and teams.

== Results ==
Rd.	Race	Pole position	Most laps led	Race winner				Report
Rd.	Race	Pole position	Most laps led	Driver	Team	Chassis	Engine	Report
1	Phoenix 1	(United States) Bobby Unser	(United States) Bobby Unser	(United States) Gordon Johncock	Patrick Racing	Penske PC-6/78	Cosworth	Report
2	Atlanta Twin	(United States) Johnny Rutherford	(United States) Gordon Johncock	(United States) Johnny Rutherford	Team McLaren	McLaren M24B	Cosworth	Report
3	Atlanta Twin	Set by field finish in race 1	(United States) Johnny Rutherford	(United States) Johnny Rutherford	Team McLaren	McLaren M24B	Cosworth	Report
4	Indianapolis 500	(United States) Rick Mears	(United States) Bobby Unser	(United States) Rick Mears	Team Penske	Penske PC-6/78	Cosworth	Report
5	Trenton Twin	(United States) Gordon Johncock	(United States) Gordon Johncock	(United States) Bobby Unser	Team Penske	Penske PC-7/79	Cosworth	Report
6	Trenton Twin	Set by field finish in race 1	(United States) Bobby Unser	(United States) Bobby Unser	Team Penske	Penske PC-7/79	Cosworth	Report
7	Michigan Twin	(United States) Bobby Unser	(United States) Gordon Johncock	(United States) Gordon Johncock	Patrick Racing	Penske PC-6/78	Cosworth	Report
8	Michigan Twin	Set by field finish in race 1	(United States) Bobby Unser	(United States) Bobby Unser	Team Penske	Penske PC-7/79	Cosworth	Report
9	Watkins Glen	(United States) Al Unser	(United States) Bobby Unser	(United States) Bobby Unser	Team Penske	Penske PC-7/79	Cosworth	Report
10	Trenton 150	(United States) Bobby Unser	(United States) Rick Mears	(United States) Rick Mears	Team Penske	Penske PC-7/79	Cosworth	Report
11	California 500	(United States) Rick Mears	(United States) Bobby Unser	(United States) Bobby Unser	Team Penske	Penske PC-7/79	Cosworth	Report
12	Michigan GP	(United States) Bobby Unser	(United States) Bobby Unser	(United States) Bobby Unser	Team Penske	Penske PC-7/79	Cosworth	Report
13	Atlanta 2	(United States) Bobby Unser	(United States) Bobby Unser	(United States) Rick Mears	Team Penske	Penske PC-7/79	Cosworth	Report
14	Phoenix 2	(United States) Bobby Unser	(United States) Al Unser	(United States) Al Unser	Chaparral Cars	Chaparral 2K	Cosworth	Report

=== Race summaries ===
==== Race 1: Arizona Republic/Jimmy Bryan 150 ====
Bobby Unser won the first pole in the new series history and dominated the race leading the most laps (86). However Unser had tire issues forcing an extra stop and history would show Gordon Johncock as the series first ever winner with Rick Mears second, and Johnny Rutherford in third.

==== Races 2 and 3: Gould Twin Dixie 125's ====
Johnny Rutherford would win the pole race 1. Race 1 would see Rutherford and Gordon Johncock dominate with Johncock leading the most laps (32) but would see Rutherford winning after a late race duel with Lee Kumzman who would hold on for second. Tom Sneva would take third while Johncock would take fourth.

Race 2 would see Rutherford again lead the field to the green flag (Race 2 lineup set by Race 1 finishing order). This time Rutherford would lead the most laps (61) and win. Rick Mears took second. Placing third was Al Unser Sr after he ran out of fuel on the final lap.

Also during this race weekend the CART teams that planned on entering the Indianapolis 500 were informed in a telegram from USAC that their board of directors voted unanimously to reject the entries of six key CART teams of Penske, Patrick, McLaren, Fletcher, Chaparral, and Gurney as they stated these six teams (19 cars) were alleged to be "harmful to racing" and "not in good standing with USAC."

==== Race 4: Indianapolis 500 ====
After the rejected six filed an emergency injunction to be allowed to qualify and compete in the race, the injunction was granted. Race Day came around following the qualifying controversy and Rick Mears won his first of six Indy 500 poles. Both Bobby and Al Unser combined to lead 174 laps. But on lap 103 Al Unsers Day came to an end with a failed transmission. Bobby Unser was then in firm control until lap 181 when he slowed with gearbox troubles. Rick Mears would lead the remainder of the race for his first of four Indy 500 wins. A J. Foyt would finish second after losing his engine on the final lap. Mike Mosely would finish third, Danny Ongais would take fourth, Bobby Unser nursed his car to a fifth place finish with an ailing gearbox.

==== Races 5 and 6: Trenton Twin Indy ====
Race 1 would see Gordon Johncock take pole. He would lead the first 44 laps (most laps led) then lose the lead on the next lap as he had to pit, then he would spin 2 laps later losing more spots. That opened the door for Bobby Unser to win with brother Al Unser Sr taking second, and Johncock would recover for third.

Starting order for race 2 was set by race 1 finishing order so Bobby Unser started first and would finish first after leading the most laps (62). Wally Dallenbach would finish second, Johnny Rutherford finished third.

==== Races 7 and 8: Norton Twin 125s ====
In the first race, Bobby Unser won the pole, followed by Al Unser, Gordon Johncock, Wally Dallenbach, and Rick Mears. Johncock jumped out to lead the first three laps, but Bobby Unser fought back and led until the first caution flew on lap 11 for Spike Gehlhausen's stalled car. Lee Kunzman stayed out under the caution and took the lead, while Bobby Unser's engine blew on lap 21. Al Unser would pick up the lead after the caution flew for Danny Ongais spinning, but he miscalculated fuel mileage and ran out of fuel with 17 laps to go. This allowed Gordon Johncock to take the lead and win. Mike Mosley finished second, Johnny Rutherford third, Rick Mears fourth and Wally Dallenbach fifth. 11 laps into the race, Tom Sneva encountered a fire in his pits, but no one was hurt.

Before the second race, Bobby Unser's crew installed a new engine. Mike Mosley led the first lap, but he had fuel pump problems the next lap and dropped out. Throughout the next 25 laps, Johnny Rutherford and Rick Mears would trade the lead, before Unser charged to the front on lap 28 and never looked back, winning the race. Rick Mears finished second on track, but he was penalized for passing cars under the yellow, dropping him to fifth. Tom Sneva moved to second, Al Unser to third, and Gordon Johncock to fourth. Two cautions flew, the first for John Mahler's stalled car on lap 23 and the second for a crash involving Danny Ongais on lap 40.

Following the second of the two races, Rick Mears was leading the points with a 460 point lead over Gordon Johncock. Bobby Unser was third, 470 points back, Johnny Rutherford fourth, 925 points back, and Mike Mosley rounded out the top 5, 960 points back.

==== Race 9: Kent Oil 150 ====
Al Unser won the pole, with Bobby Unser, Danny Ongais, Rick Mears and Gordon Johncock making up the rest of the top five. In the race, Al and Bobby Unser dominated, the two brothers being the only ones to lead laps throughout the day. Bobby Unser took the lead for good after Al had transmission problems on lap 48, and led the rest of the race to win over Rick Mears. Gordon Johncock finished third, Danny Ongais fourth, and Al Unser fell to fifth.

With his win, Bobby Unser rose to second in points, 410 points behind Rick Mears. Gordon Johncock fell to third, 490 points back, Johnny Rutherford was in fourth, 1157 points back after dropping out with a blown engine, and Mike Mosley remained in fifth, falling to 1185 points behind after dropping out with a broken gearbox.

==== Race 10: Ditzler 150 ====
Bobby Unser won the pole, with Gordon Johncock, Tom Sneva, Danny Ongais, and Rick Mears making up the rest of the top five.

The race was postponed over a week due to rain. When the race did run, except for one lap led by Bill Alsup, Unser, Sneva, and Mears were the only ones to lead the race. Bobby Unser led the first 20 laps, before giving the lead to Mears. Tom Sneva then led at lap 57, followed by Unser regaining the lead on lap 69. Unser made a pit stop with 14 laps to go, giving the lead back to Sneva. Rick Mears gambled on pit strategy, and passed Tom Sneva with just 3 laps to go to win the final ever IndyCar race at Trenton. Bobby Unser also passed him, taking advantage of Sneva's fading tires to finish second. Sneva fell to third, Wally Dallenbach finished fourth after running as high as second before an extended pit stop, and Johnny Rutherford finished fifth. Two cautions slowed the race, both for crashes. One was by Gordon Johncock on lap 5, and the other by Mike Mosley on lap 36.

Rick Mears extended his point lead to 470 points over Bobby Unser. Gordon Johncock remained in third, 782 points back, Johnny Rutherford stayed in fourth, 1307 points back, and Al Unser rose to fifth in points, 1450 points behind.

==== Race 11: California 500 ====
Rick Mears qualified on the pole, followed by Al Unser, Bobby Unser, Mario Andretti, in a one-off appearance for Penske, and Tom Sneva.

In the race, Al Unser led most of the first half of the race, but lost three laps due to a broken front-spoiler bracket. For the remainder of the race, Bobby Unser and Rick Mears traded the lead, While leading on lap 164, Rick Mears killed the engine on his pit stop, causing him to lose 12 seconds to Bobby Unser. This allowed Unser to lead most of the remaining laps, and won over Rick Mears. Mario Andretti claimed third despite running out of gas at the end, Johnny Rutherford finished fourth, and Al Unser ended up in fifth.

His win allowed Unser to close up to 270 points behind Mears, with Johnny Rutherford rising to third in points, Gordon Johncock falling to fourth, and Al Unser remaining in fifth. Apart from Unser, all other drivers were mathematically eliminated from the championship.

==== Race 12: Gould Grand Prix ====
Bobby Unser claimed the pole, his fourth of the season, with Rick Mears starting second, Gordon Johncock starting third, Johnny Rutherford starting fourth, and Al Unser rounding out the top five.

In the race, Gordon Johncock dominated the early stages of the race, before his engine blew while leading on the 36th lap. This allowed Bobby Unser to take the lead, and hold it the rest of the way to win over Tom Sneva. Rick Mears was third despite running out of gas on the final lap, Johnny Rutherford finished fourth, and Tom Bagley was fifth. The win was the fifth straight for Team Penske.

Bobby Unser was now just 180 points behind Mears in the fight, followed by Rutherford, Johncock, and Al Unser.

==== Race 13: Rich's Atlanta Classic ====
Bobby Unser claimed his fifth pole of the year, followed by Rick Mears, Al Unser, Danny Ongais, and Johnny Rutherford.

In the race, Unser dominated the first half of the race, but while leading on lap 55 suffered a blown tire handing the lead to Johnny Rutherford. But with 25 laps remaining in the race, Rutherford's engine blew, which allowed Rick Mears to cruise to an easy victory. Gordon Johncock placed second, despite running out of gas on the final lap, Bobby Unser wound up third, Wally Dallenbach finished fourth, and Al Unser, who had tire problems of his own, finished fifth. The win was Penske's sixth straight.

The win gave Rick Mears a near-insurmountable 270 point lead in the points, which meant that he would win the championship as long as he finished 11th or better in the final round.

==== Race 14: Miller High Life 150 ====
For the last race of the year, Bobby Unser won another pole, his sixth of the year. Al Unser started second, Wally Dallenbach in third, Rick Mears in fourth, and Tom Sneva in fifth.

In the race, Al Unser jumped out to the lead on the first lap. He would eventually dominate the race, leading 138 of the 150 laps and only giving up the lead for a pair of pit stops. There were two late-race cautions, one when Wally Dallenbach spun with 9 laps to go, and one when Pancho Carter lost a wheel, which led to a two-lap shootout but Unser pulled away en route to his first and only win of the year, snapping a six-race Penske streak. Bobby Unser claimed second, Rick Mears third, Gordon Johncock fourth, and Tom Sneva fifth.

Mears's third was enough for him to claim the inaugural CART championship, winning by 240 points over Bobby Unser. Gordon Johncock finished third in points, with Johnny Rutherford in fourth and Al Unser in fifth.

== Points standings ==
=== Final driver standings ===
Pos	Driver	PHX1 (United States)	ATL2 (United States)		INDY (United States)	TRT1 (United States)		MIS1 (United States)		WGL (United States)	TRT2 (United States)	ONT (United States)	MIS2 (United States)	ATL2 (United States)	PHX2 (United States)	Pts
1	(United States) Rick Mears	2	5	2	**1**	5	7	4	5	2	1*	**2**	3	1	3	4060
2	(United States) Bobby Unser	**5***	7	4	5*	1	**1***	**19**	1*	1*	**2**	1*	**1***	**3***	**2**	3820
3	(United States) Gordon Johncock	1	4*	9	6	**3***	5	1*	**4**	3	16	15	13	2	4	2211
4	(United States) Johnny Rutherford	3	**1**	**1***	18	15	3	3	11	15	5	4	4	11	6	2163
5	(United States) Al Unser	4	6	3	22	2	12	13	3	**5**	6	5	10	5	1*	2085
6	(United States) Danny Ongais	15	14	6	4	7	6	18	12	4	13	6	DNS	15	17	1473
7	(United States) Tom Sneva	17	3	5	15	6	15	21	2	10	3	17	2	8	5	1360
8	(United States) Tom Bagley	8	8	7	9	8	4	6	6	6	7	32	5	Wth	9	1208
9	(United States) Wally Dallenbach	7	11	8	27	4	2	5	10	14	4	24	6	4	12	1149
10	(United States) Mike Mosley	6	17	17	3	13	DNS	2	20	12	14	34	DNS	14	10	1126
11	(United States) Mario Andretti											3	Wth			700
12	(United States) Lee Kunzman	9	2	18	30	14	DNS	14	17			9				490
13	(United States) Pancho Carter	20	9	11	20	10	8	7	14	16	DNS	28	8	13	7	452
14	(Australia) Vern Schuppan	21	12	12	21			16	DNS	7	DNS	7	16		14	449
15	(United States) Bill Alsup RY	11	16	15	DNQ	12	9	9	13	9	10	22	9	10	11	400
16	(United States) Joe Saldana	13	13	13	16	17	16	10	8	13	8	30	17	6	18	368
17	(United States) Spike Gehlhausen	18	18	16	10	18	13	22	21	17	11	25	11	16	8	343
18	(United States) Salt Walther	12	10	10	12			8	7			20	12			314
19	(United States) Steve Krisiloff	16	15	DNS	11	9	14	17	18	18	DNS	23	6			279
20	(United States) Tom Frantz	14	Wth		DNQ			11	16	11	9	11	14			236
21	(United States) Jerry Sneva				31							10				155
22	(United States) Tim Richmond R							23	DNS	8	12	26			15	112
23	(United States) Larry Rice	10	DNQ	14	19	16	10									105
24	(United States) Herm Johnson R													7	13	98
25	(United States) John Mahler	19	Wth		25	11	11	12	15	Wth						74
26	(United States) Al Loquasto				DNQ			20	9			21				70
27	(United States) Larry Cannon				DNQ			Wth			15	14	15	12	16	56
28	(United States) Dick Ferguson R				DNQ			15	19			16			Wth	35
29	(United States) Billy Scott				DNQ							19				20
30	(United States) Phil Caliva R											27				10
-	(United States) A. J. Foyt				2											-
-	(United States) Howdy Holmes R				7											-
-	(United States) Bill Vukovich II				8											-
-	(United States) Don Whittington R											8				-
-	(Canada) Frank Weiss				Wth									9		-
-	(United States) Bill Whittington R											12				-
-	(United States) Roger Mears R											13				-
-	(United States) Roger McCluskey				13											-
-	(United States) Tom Bigelow				14											-
-	(United States) Phil Threshie				17											-
-	(United States) John Martin				DNQ							18				-
-	(Canada) Eldon Rasmussen				23											-
-	(United States) Larry Dickson				24											-
-	(United States) Dick Simon				26											-
-	(United States) Sheldon Kinser				28											-
-	(Canada) Cliff Hucul				29							35				-
-	(United States) Bob Harkey				Wth							29				-
-	(Australia) Dennis Firestone R											31				-
-	(United States) Johnny Parsons				32							33				-
-	(United States) George Snider				33											-
-	(United States) Janet Guthrie				34											-
-	(United States) Jim McElreath				35											-
-	(United States) Bill Puterbaugh				DNQ											-
-	(United States) Billy Engelhart R				DNQ											-
-	(United States) Dana Carter R				DNQ											-
-	(United States) Gary Bettenhausen				DNQ											-
-	(United States) Hurley Haywood R				DNQ											-
-	(United States) Jerry Karl				DNQ											-
-	(United States) Jim Hurtubise				DNQ											-
-	(United States) Larry McCoy				DNQ											-
-	(United States) Roger Rager				DNQ											-
-	(United States) Todd Gibson				DNQ											-
-	(United States) Neil Bonnett R				Wth											-
-	(United States) Bill Henderson R					Wth										-
Pos	Driver	PHX1 (United States)	ATL2 (United States)		INDY (United States)	TRT1 (United States)		MIS1 (United States)		WGL (United States)	TRT2 (United States)	ONT (United States)	MIS2 (United States)	ATL2 (United States)	PHX2 (United States)	Pts

Color	Result
Gold	Winner
Silver	2nd place
Bronze	3rd place
Green	4th & 5th place
Light Blue	6th-10th place
Dark Blue	Finished (Outside Top 10)
Purple	Did not finish
Red	Did not qualify (DNQ)
Brown	Withdrawn (Wth)
Black	Disqualified (DSQ)
White	Did not start (DNS)
Blank	Did not participate (DNP)
Blank	Not competing

**In-line notation**
**Bold**	Pole position
Italics	Ran fastest race lap
*	Led most race laps
RY	Rookie of the Year
R	Rookie

=== Driver breakdown ===
Pos	Driver	Team/Car Owner	Starts	Wins	Podiums	Top 5s	Top 10s	Poles	Points
1	(United States) Mears	(United States) Team Penske	14	3	9	13	14	2	4,060
2	(United States) B. Unser	(United States) Team Penske	14	6	9	12	13	7	3,820
3	(United States) Johncock	(United States) Patrick Racing	14	2	5	9	11	2	2,211
4	(United States) Rutherford	(United States) Team McLaren	14	2	5	8	9	2	2,163
5	(United States) A. Unser	(United States) Chaparral Cars	14	1	4	8	10	1	2,085
6	(United States) Ongais	(United States) Interscope Racing	13	0	0	2	6	0	1,473
7	(United States) T. Sneva	(United States) Jerry O'Connell Racing	14	0	2	6	8	0	1,360
8	(United States) Bagley	(United States) Longhorn Racing	13	0	0	2	12	0	1,208
9	(United States) Wally Dallenbach	(United States) Patrick Racing	14	0	1	5	8	0	1,149
10	(United States) Mosley	(United States) All American Racers	12	0	2	2	3	0	1,126
11	(United States) Andretti	(United States) Team Penske	1	0	1	1	1	0	700
12	(United States) Kunzman	(United States) Conqueste Racing Team	8	0	1	1	3	0	490
13	(United States) Carter	(United States) Morales Motorsports	13	0	0	0	6	0	452
14	(Australia) Schuppan	(United States) Wysard Racing	8	0	0	0	2	0	449
15	(United States) Alsup R	(United States) WASP Racing/Team Penske/Gehlhausen Racing	13	0	0	0	6	0	400
16	(United States) Saldana	(United States) Hoffman Racing	13	0	0	0	4	0	368
17	(United States) Gehlhausen	(United States) Gehlhausen Racing/Bob Fletcher Racing	14	0	0	0	2	0	343
18	(United States) Walther	(United States) Walmotor	8	0	0	0	4	0	314
19	(United States) Krisiloff	(United States) Bob Fletcher Racing/Patrick Racing/Longhorn Racing	10	0	0	0	2	0	279
20	(United States) Frantz	(United States) Frantz Racing	7	0	0	0	1	0	236
21	(United States) J. Sneva	(United States) Hodgdon Racing	2	0	0	0	0	0	155
22	(United States) Richmond	(United States) Mach 1 Racing/S&M Electric	5	0	0	0	1	0	112
23	(United States) Rice	(United States) S&M Electric	5	0	0	0	2	0	105
24	(United States) Johnson	(United States) Mergard Racing	2	0	0	0	1	0	98
25	(United States) Mahler	(United States) Intercomp	6	0	0	0	0	0	74
26	(United States) Loquasto	(United States) Gehlhausen Racing	3	0	0	0	1	0	70
27	(United States) Cannon	(United States) Canon Racing	4	0	0	0	0	0	56
28	(United States) Ferguson	(United States) Hoffman Racing	3	0	0	0	0	0	35
29	(United States) Scott	(United States) Wheel Center	1	0	0	0	0	0	20
30	(United States) Caliva	(United States) Gehlhausen Racing	1	0	0	0	0	0	10

== See also ==
- 1979 Indianapolis 500
- 1979 USAC Championship Car season
