= M15 =

M15 or M-15 may refer to:

== In science ==
- Messier 15 (M15), a globular cluster in the constellation Pegasus

== In firearms and military equipment ==
- M15 mine, a United States anti-tank mine
- M15 rifle, a variant of the M14, a United States military rifle
- Grigorovich M-15, a Russian World War I-era biplane flying boat
- M15 pistol, a General Officer's variant of the M1911A1
- M15 Half-track
- M15/42 tank, an Italian medium tank

== In transportation ==
- M-15 (Michigan highway), a highway in the lower peninsula of Michigan, US
- M15 motorway (Hungary), a motorway in Hungary
- M15 road (East London), a Metropolitan Route in East London, South Africa
- M15 (Cape Town), a Metropolitan Route in Cape Town, South Africa
- M15 road (Pretoria), a Metropolitan Route in Pretoria, South Africa
- M15 road (Durban), a Metropolitan Route in Durban, South Africa
- M15 road (Bloemfontein), a Metropolitan Route in Bloemfontein, South Africa
- M15 (Gqeberha), a Metropolitan Route in Gqeberha, South Africa
- The Hunter Expressway in New South Wales, Australia
- M15 motorway (Great Britain), an unbuilt motorway in London
- M15 (New York City bus), a New York City Bus route in Manhattan, US
- Select Bus Service § M15, a New York City Bus route in Manhattan, US
- Noble M15, a British sport car built by Noble Automotive Ltd
- FAA location identifier for James Tucker Airport, a rural airport in Linden, Tennessee, US
- GER Class M15, a class of British 2-4-2T steam locomotive
- WSK-Mielec PZL M-15 Belphegor, a Polish-designed jet-engined agricultural biplane
- M15 fuel mixed with 15% of methanol
- M15 road (Zambia), a road in Zambia

== In sports ==
- Markku Uusipaavalniemi (nicknamed "M-15"), a Finnish curler
- McLaren M15, an Indycar chassis

== In computing ==
- An ergonomic model of IBM's Model M keyboard, produced in the mid-1990s.

== See also ==
- 15-M, Anti-austerity movement in Spain
- MI5, the United Kingdom's counter-intelligence and security agency
- Shorthand for Model 15
- Magic 2015, a Magic: The Gathering expansion set
