= 1977 California 500 =

American auto race

(United States) 1977 California 500
Race details
- Race 12 of 14 in the 1977 USAC Championship Car season
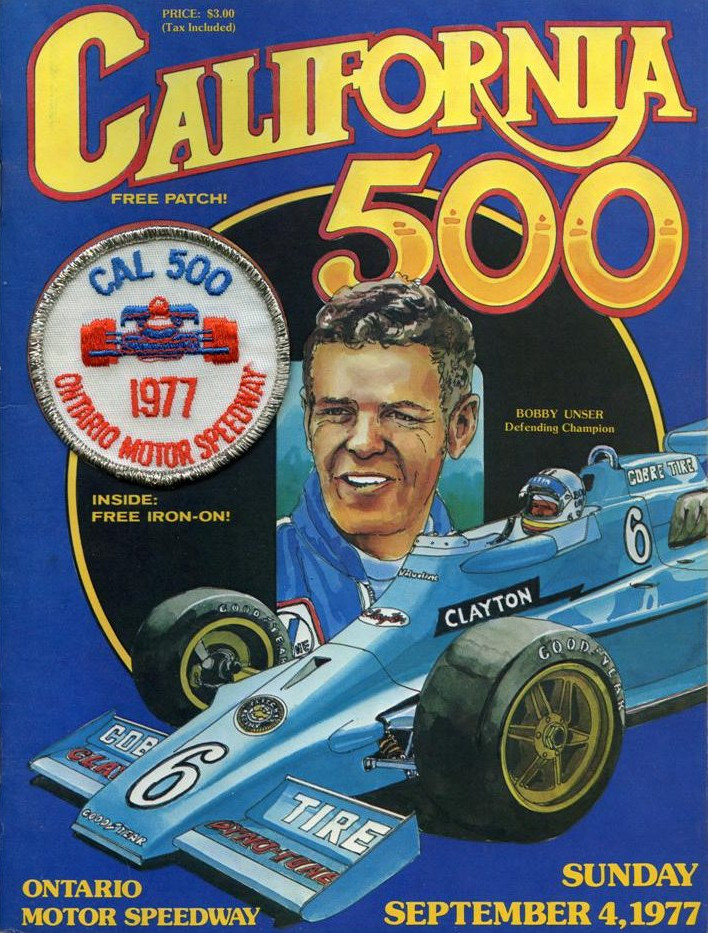
- Date: September 4, 1977
- Official name: 1977 California 500
- Location: Ontario Motor Speedway, Ontario, California, United States
- Course: Permanent racing facility 2.500 mi / 4.023 km
- Distance: 200 laps 500.000 mi / 804.672 km

Pole position
- Driver: (United States) Johnny Rutherford (McLaren)
- Time: 195.111 mph (314.001 km/h)

Podium
- First: (United States) Al Unser (Vel's Parnelli Jones Racing)
- Second: (United States) A. J. Foyt (A. J. Foyt Racing)
- Third: (United States) Tom Sneva (Tom Sneva)

The 1977 California 500, the eighth running of the event, was held at the Ontario Motor Speedway in Ontario, California, on Sunday, September 4, 1977. The event was race number 12 of 14 in the 1977 USAC Championship Car season. The race was won by Al Unser, his first win in the California 500.

== Background ==
USAC opened their season at Ontario with a 200-mile race on March 6. A. J. Foyt won the race over Al Unser. That same day, Foyt finished third in the USAC Stock Car race at Ontario, won by Jimmy Insolo.

In May, A.J. Foyt won the 1977 Indianapolis 500, becoming the first man to win the race for a fourth time.

In addition to Tom Sneva, Team Penske entered a second car for Mario Andretti, who was chasing the 1977 Formula One championship. Two months earlier, Sneva and Andretti finished 1–2 in the Pocono 500.

== Practice and Time Trials ==
Practice began on Sunday, August 28. Defending California 500 champion, Bobby Unser was fastest at 190.496 mph. In Monday's practice, Johnny Rutherford was fastest at 193.440 mph. Rutherford had a close call when Chuck Gurney spun as Rutherford came up to pass him in turn one. Rutherford was able to squeeze between Gurney's spinning car before he backed into the wall. Gurney suffered a slight concussion.

Rutherford was again fastest on Tuesday with a speed of 197.425 mph. Two days after competing in the 1977 Dutch Grand Prix, Mario Andretti began practicing, and posted the second fastest speed at 194.363 mph.

=== Pole Day - Wednesday August 31 ===
Qualifying was a four-lap, 10-mile run. Johnny Rutherford won the pole with a four-lap average of 195.111 mph. Late in the afternoon, Mario Andretti made a run at 194.900 mph, good enough to claim the second position. Al Unser completed the front row with a speed of 194.774 mph. Joe Saldana and Phil Threshie had separate crashes in turm one on their qualifying runs. Both cars were too damaged to be repaired and withdrew from the race.

=== Bump Day - Thursday September 1 ===
In the second and final day of qualifying, Danny Ongais posted the fastest speed of all cars in the field at 196.389 mph. Ongais blew an engine on Wednesday morning and was unable to make a qualifying attempt on Day 1. Because his run came on day 2, he started the race 20th.

Late in the qualifying session, 32 cars had qualified for the race, meaning there was one vacant position. Jerry Sneva attempted to make a qualifying run, but was black-flagged for leaking oil. He returned to pit road and got in the qualifying line behind Bob Harkey and Eldon Rasmussen, who had lost a cylinder in practice. As time expired, Bob Harkey went onto the track to begin his qualifying run. He seemingly was assured a spot in the field, regardless of his speed, since there was still one spot open. On his second lap, Harkey's engine blew and he was unable to complete his run. USAC determined the final starting spot by random drawing: Harkey, Sneva, or Rasmussen. Rasmussen was the lucky winner and earned the 33rd starting spot for the race.

== Race ==
Actor James Garner drove the Datsun 280Z pace car. The crowd was estimated at 70,000 spectators, the highest crowd in many years.

From his position in the middle of the front row, Mario Andretti took the lead at the start. On lap three, Dick Simon retired from the race with a burnt piston.

Steve Krisiloff brought out a caution on lap 12 when he came a stop on track. The fastest qualifier, Danny Ongais, climbed from his 20th starting spot to take the lead when the leaders pitted under caution.

On lap 76, Janet Guthrie broke a hose clamp and entered the pits. While there, she turned her car over to teammate Dick Simon, who was eligible to earn points as a relief driver. "I owe Dick a lot. He's done many favors for me. I was glad to be able to repay him a little." Guthrie then flew to Darlington, South Carolina where she competed in NASCAR's Southern 500 the next day. Simon continued until lap 113 when he blew an engine and spun.

Mike Mosley made his return to IndyCar racing after suffering a concussion and whiplash in a crash at the Pocono 500 in June. Near halfway, Mosley left his pits after a routine pitstop and his car caught fire. He stopped in the Patrick Racing pit stall and jumped out of the car as the fire was extinguished. Mosley returned to the race 12 laps down, but retired after 135 laps due to engine failure.

By halfway, the race appeared to be a battle between Al Unser, Danny Ongais, and Gordon Johncock. Johncock took the lead on lap 152 and had extended his advantage to 17 seconds. Running third with 36 laps remaining, Ongais ran out of fuel on the backstretch. The caution was waved to retrieve his stalled car. Ongais lost eight laps due to the miscue.

The caution bunched up the leaders. With 24 laps remaining, Johncock held a slim one car-length lead over Unser. Entering turn one, Johncock lost control and spun out, lightly hitting the wall.

Unser was unchallenged after Johncock's crash. He led the final 25 laps and won his first California 500 by 46 seconds over A.J. Foyt. Tom Sneva finished third and clinched the 1977 USAC Championship. Mario Andretti finished fourth. Seven days later, Andretti won the 1977 Italian Grand Prix. 11 of the 33 starters finished the race.

== Box score ==
Finish	Grid	No	Name	Entrant	Chassis	Engine	Laps	Time/Status	Led	Points
1	3	21	(United States) Al Unser	Vel's Parnelli Jones Racing	Parnelli VPJ6B	Cosworth DFX	200	3:17:16.370	93	1000
2	6	14	(United States) A. J. Foyt	A. J. Foyt Enterprises	Coyote	Foyt	200	+47.93	0	800
3	4	8	(United States) Tom Sneva	Penske Racing	McLaren M24	Cosworth DFX	199	Flagged	0	700
4	2	9	(United States) Mario Andretti	Penske Racing	McLaren M24	Cosworth DFX	197	Flagged	12	600
5	8	78	(United States) Bobby Olivero	Alex Morales Motorsports	Lightning	Offenhauser	195	Flagged	0	500
6	22	15	(Australia) Vern Schuppan	Alex Morales Motorsports	Lightning	Offenhauser	195	Flagged	0	400
7	29	80	(United States) Larry Dickson	RP Racing	McLaren M16C	Offenhauser	193	Flagged	0	300
8	20	25	(United States) Danny Ongais	Interscope Racing	Parnelli VPJ6B	Cosworth DFX	192	Flagged	23	250
9	11	74	(United States) Jim McElreath	Hodgson Racing	Eagle	AMC	186	Flagged	0	200
10	30	28	(United States) John Martin	American Kids Racers	Eagle	Offenhauser	186	Flagged	0	150
11	5	20	(United States) Gordon Johncock	Patrick Racing	Wildcat Mk2	DGS	174	Crash	67	100
12	32	85	(United States) Larry Cannon	Cannon Bros	Wildcat Mk2	Offenhauser	168	Flagged	0	50
13	13	19	(United States) Spike Gehlhausen	Margie Gehlhausen	Eagle	Offenhauser	163	Transmission	0	0
14	24	48	(United States) Pancho Carter	All American Racers	Eagle	Offenhauser	154	Overheating	0	0
15	15	65	(United States) Lee Kunzman	Pat Santello	Eagle	Offenhauser	138	Turbocharger	0	0
16	9	5	(United States) Mike Mosley	Jerry O'Connell Racing	Lightning	Offenhauser	135	Engine	5	0
17	26	98	(United States) Gary Bettenhausen	J. C. Agajanian	King	Offenhauser	117	Water pump	0	0
18	27	86	(United States) Al Loquasto	Loquasto Racing	McLaren M16B	Offenhauser	112	Manifold	0	0
19	25	27	(United States) Janet Guthrie	Vollstedt Enterprises	Lightning	Offenhauser	112	Engine	0	0
20	21	40	(United States) Wally Dallenbach	Patrick Racing	Wildcat Mk2	DGS	78	Engine	0	0
21	33	58	(Canada) Eldon Rasmussen	Rasmussen Racing	Rascar	Foyt	75	Engine	0	0
22	10	11	(United States) Roger McCluskey	Lindsey Hopkins Racing	Lightning	Offenhauser	57	Piston	0	0
23	18	26	(United States) James McElreath	McElreath Racing	Eagle	Offenhauser	48	Engine	0	0
24	1	2	(United States) Johnny Rutherford	Team McLaren	McLaren M24	Cosworth DFX	46	Valve	0	0
25	28	77	(United States) Salt Walther	Dayton-Walther	McLaren M16C/D	Offenhauser	45	Engine	0	0
26	17	38	(United States) Rick Mears	Theodore Racing	McLaren M16C/D	Offenhauser	42	Engine	0	0
27	19	91	(United States) Steve Krisiloff	Art Sugai	Eagle	Offenhauser	27	Engine	0	0
28	23	24	(United States) Tom Bigelow	Leader Card Racers	Watson	Offenhauser	23	Valve	0	0
29	16	30	(United States) Johnny Parsons	Thunder Racing	McLaren M16C	Offenhauser	23	Piston	0	0
30	7	6	(United States) Bobby Unser	Fletcher Racing Team	Lightning	Offenhauser	18	Suspension	0	0
31	31	97	(United States) Bill Vukovich II	Grant King Racers	King	Offenhauser	14	Engine	0	0
32	14	18	(United States) George Snider	Longhorn Racing	Eagle	Offenhauser	8	Gearbox	0	0
33	12	17	(United States) Dick Simon	Vollstedt Enterprises	Vollstedt	Offenhauser	3	Piston	0	0
