= Kahleberg (disambiguation) =

Kahleberg may refer to:

- Kahleberg, a mountain in the Ore Mountains, Germany
- Lysý vrch, a mountain in the Jizera Mountains on the Czech/Polish border
- Boreč (mountain), a mountain in the Bohemian Central Uplands, the Czech Republic
- Łysa Wyspa, a Polish island in the Neuwarper See, a bay of the Stettin Lagoon
- Kahleberg, a cargo ship of the Type RO 15
