= Type 15 =

Type 15 may refer to:

- Type 15 frigate, a class of British anti-submarine frigates of the Royal Navy
- Bugatti Typ 15, a Bugatti car
- Peugeot Type 15, an early Peugeot model built from 1897 to 1901
- BRM Type 15, a Formula One racing car of the early 1950s
- Bristol F.2 Fighter (Bristol Type 15), a British two-seat biplane fighter and reconnaissance aircraft of the First World War
- Hiro H1H (Hiro Navy Type 15 Flying boat), a 1920s Japanese bomber or reconnaissance biplane
- Type RO 15, a class of German cargo ship built in the 1980s
- Type 15 tank, a light tank made by Norinco, in service in the PR China since 2015

== See also ==
- Class 15 (disambiguation)
- Model 15 (disambiguation)
