= Class 15 =

Class 15 may refer to:

- A15-class container ship
- Belgian Railways Class 15
- British Rail Class 15
- DR Class V 15
- DRG Class 15, which was used twice by the Deutsche Reichsbahn in its classification of steam locomotives:
  - In 1925 for the Bavarian S 2/6 express locomotive
  - In 1938 following the Anschluss of Austria for the Austrian Class 10 of the Federal Railway of Austria (BBÖ)
- GER Class G15
- GER Class M15
- I-15-class submarine
- JNR Class DD15
- JNR Class DE15
- JNR Class ED15
- LSWR D15 class
- LSWR H15 class
- LSWR N15 class
- LSWR S15 class
- M15-class monitor
- NSB El 15
- PKP class SM15
- Rhodesia Railways 15th class
- South African Class 15F 4-8-2
- South African Class NG15 2-8-2
- SR N15X class

== See also ==
- Type 15 (disambiguation)
