= Penske PC-7 =

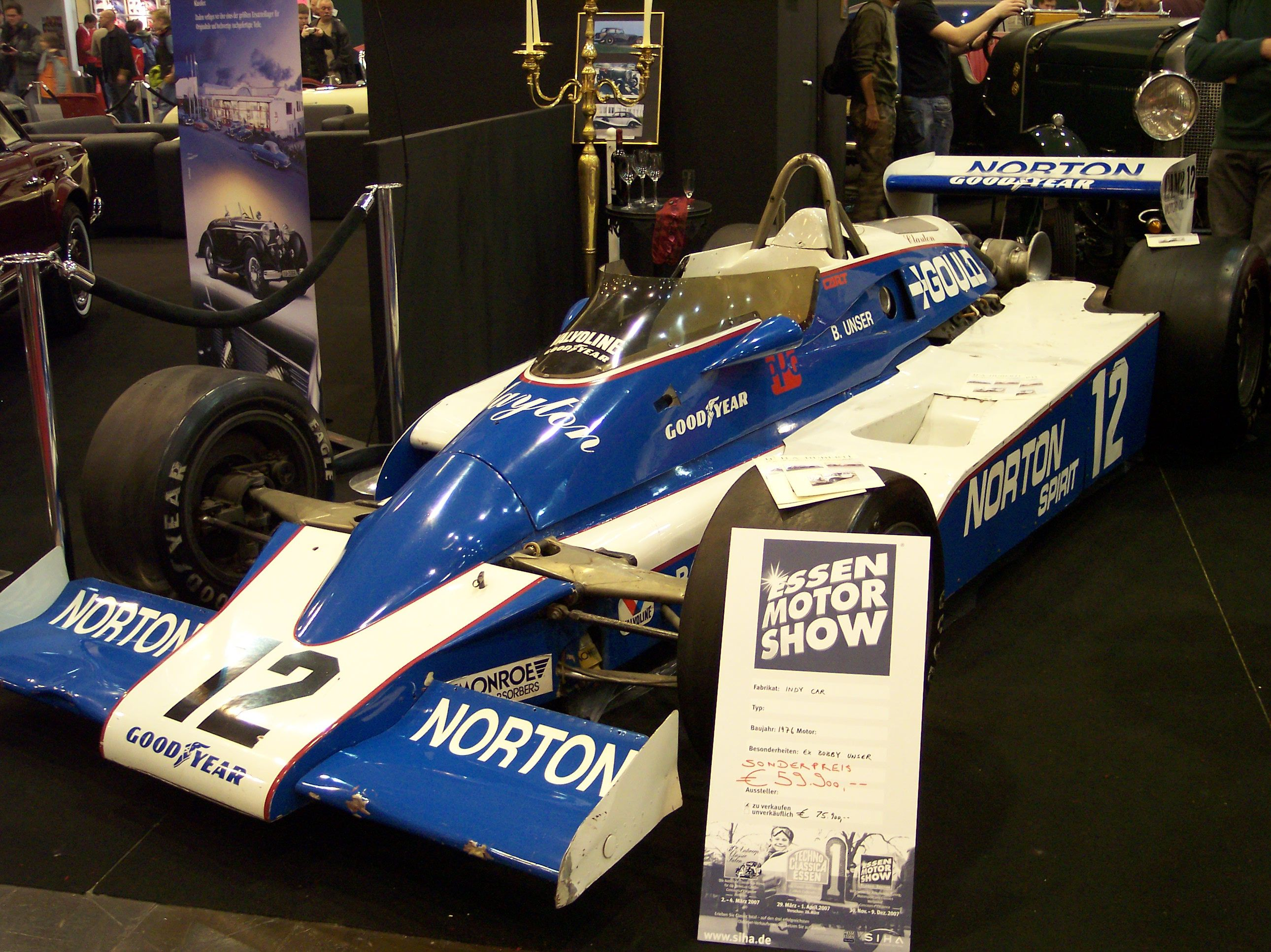
- Category: CART IndyCar
- Constructor: Penske
- Designer: Geoff Ferris
- Predecessor: Penske PC-6
- Successor: Penske PC-9

Technical specifications
- Chassis: Aluminum Monocoque
- Suspension: Inboard springs and Fox shocks front and rear, operated by top rocker arm with front and lower rear A arms of streamline tubing
- Engine: Cosworth DFX 2,650 cc (161.7 cu in) V8 80° Mid-engined, longitudinally mounted
- Transmission: Hewland L.G.500 4 speed manual
- Weight: 1,550 lb (703.1 kg)
- Fuel: Methanol, supplied by Mobil
- Tyres: Goodyear Eagle Speedway Specials - Rear 27.0x14.5-15 - Front 25.5x10.0-15

Competition history
- Notable entrants: Penske Racing
- Notable drivers: Rick Mears; Bobby Unser

The Penske PC-7 is a CART open-wheel race car, designed by British designer Geoff Ferris at Penske Racing, which was constructed for competition in the 1979 season.
