= 1979 Arizona Republic / Jimmy Bryan 150 =

First round of the 1979 CART season

(United States) 1979 Arizona Republic / Jimmy Bryan 150
Race details
- Race 1 of 14 in the 1979 CART season
- Map of the Track
- Date: March 11, 1979
- Official name: Arizona Republic / Jimmy Bryan 150
- Location: Phoenix International Raceway; Avondale, Arizona, United States
- Course: Tri-Oval; 1.000 mi / 1.610 km
- Distance: 150 laps 150.000 mi / 241.500 km
- Weather: Temperatures reaching up to 80.1 °F (26.7 °C); wind speeds reaching up to 12.7 miles per hour (20.4 km/h)

Pole position
- Driver: (United States) Bobby Unser (Roger Penske)
- Time: 24.714

Podium
- First: (United States) Gordon Johncock (Pat Patrick)
- Second: (United States) Rick Mears (Roger Penske)
- Third: (United States) Johnny Rutherford (Bruce McLaren)

The 1979 Arizona Republic / Jimmy Bryan 150 was the first round of the 1979 CART season, held on March 11, at Phoenix International Raceway, Avondale, Arizona. It marked the debut of the Championship Auto Racing Teams (CART) era of Indy car racing.

== Race ==
=== Summary ===
In the inaugural race for the new sanctioning body, Bobby Unser won the pole with Tom Sneva starting in second. Johnny Rutherford started third, Danny Ongais started fourth, and Rick Mears rounded out the top five starters.

From his pole position, Bobby Unser led almost all of the first 86 laps, only giving up the lead for pit stops. The first caution of the day flew on lap 2, after Vern Schuppan broke a joint and went off track in the first turn. The second caution flew due to a stalled car at lap 15, and the third due to debris picked up when Gordon Johncock left the pits on lap 69. After Unser was forced to make an unscheduled pit stop due to tire problems, Danny Ongais took the lead on lap 87, and held it for the next 33 laps, but soon after giving up the lead to Johncock retired with a blown engine, bringing out the final caution of the day. Johncock went on to win the race, with Rick Mears finishing second, Johnny Rutherford third, Al Unser fourth, and Bobby Unser rounding out the top five.

There was some confusion in the final few laps, with Al Unser listed as running higher than he actually was.

=== Results ===
| Pos | Sta | # | Driver | Owner | Laps | Time/Retired | Led | Pts |
|---|---|---|---|---|---|---|---|---|
| 1 | 2 | 20 | (United States) Gordon Johncock | Pat Patrick | 150 | 1:15:23.016 | 33 | 300 |
| 2 | 5 | 9 | (United States) Rick Mears | Roger Penske | 150 | - | 0 | 240 |
| 3 | 3 | 4 | (United States) Johnny Rutherford | Bruce McLaren | 150 | - | 0 | 210 |
| 4 | 10 | 2 | (United States) Al Unser | Chaparral Cars | 150 | - | 0 | 180 |
| 5 | 1 | 12 | (United States) Bobby Unser | Roger Penske | 149 | + 1 Lap | 84 | 150 |
| 6 | 7 | 36 | (United States) Mike Mosley | Dan Gurney | 148 | + 2 Laps | 0 | 120 |
| 7 | 6 | 40 | (United States) Wally Dallenbach | Pat Patrick | 147 | + 3 Laps | 0 | 90 |
| 8 | 9 | 11 | (United States) Tom Bagley | Bobby Hillin | 145 | + 5 Laps | 0 | 75 |
| 9 | 17 | 21 | (United States) Lee Kunzman | Conqueste Racing Team | 143 | + 7 Laps | 0 | 60 |
| 10 | 19 | 35 | (United States) Larry Rice | Private | 143 | + 7 Laps | 0 | 45 |
| 11 | 21 | 41 | (United States) Bill Alsup | Bill Alsup | 141 | + 9 Laps | 0 | 30 |
| 12 | 15 | 77 | (United States) Salt Walther | Walmotors | 139 | + 11 Laps | 0 | 15 |
| 13 | 13 | 69 | (United States) Joe Saldana | Hoffman Racing | 139b | + 11 Laps | 0 | 8 |
| 14 | 18 | 28 | (United States) Tom Frantz | Tom Frantz | 139 | + 11 Laps | 0 | 8 |
| 15 | 4 | 25 | (United States) Danny Ongais | Ted Field | 128 | Engine | 33 | 8 |
| 16 | 11 | 7 | (United States) Steve Krisiloff | Fletcher Racing | 63 | Gearbox | 0 | 8 |
| 17 | 2 | 1 | (United States) Tom Sneva | Jerry O'Connell Racing | 43 | Engine | 0 | 6 |
| 18 | 14 | 19 | (United States) Spike Gehlhausen | Carl Gehlhausen | 12 | Water Line | 0 | 6 |
| 19 | 16 | 92 | (United States) John Mahler | Intercomp | 12 | Piston | 0 | 6 |
| 20 | 12 | 10 | (United States) Pancho Carter | Alex Morales | 7 | Gearbox | 0 | 6 |
| 21 | 20 | 34 | (Australia) Vern Schuppan | Herb Wysard | 2 | U-Joint | 0 | 5 |

=== Caution flag breakdown ===
| Condition | From Lap | To Lap | # Of Laps | Reason |
|---|---|---|---|---|
| Green | 1 | 2 | 2 | |
| Yellow | 3 | 6 | 4 | Vern Schuppan off at turn 1 |
| Green | 7 | 14 | 8 | |
| Yellow | 15 | 16 | 2 | stalled car |
| Green | 17 | 68 | 52 | |
| Yellow | 69 | 76 | 8 | debris |
| Green | 77 | 128 | 52 | |
| Yellow | 129 | 139 | 11 | Danny Ongais oil on track |
| Green | 140 | 150 | 11 | |

16.7% of race run under caution.

=== Lap leader breakdown ===
| Leader | From Lap | To Lap | # Of Laps |
|---|---|---|---|
| Bobby Unser | 1 | 64 | 64 |
| Gordon Johncock | 65 | 66 | 2 |
| Bobby Unser | 67 | 86 | 20 |
| Danny Ongais | 87 | 119 | 33 |
| Gordon Johncock | 120 | 150 | 31 |

=== Points standings after this race ===
Note: Only the top ten positions are listed.

| Rank | Driver | Points | Diff |
|---|---|---|---|
| 1 | Gordon Johncock | 300 | |
| 2 | Rick Mears | 240 | -60 |
| 3 | Johnny Rutherford | 210 | -90 |
| 4 | Al Unser | 180 | -120 |
| 5 | Bobby Unser | 150 | -150 |
| 6 | Mike Mosley | 120 | -180 |
| 7 | Wally Dallenbach | 90 | -210 |
| 8 | Tom Bagley | 75 | -225 |
| 9 | Lee Kunzman | 60 | -240 |
| 10 | Larry Rice | 45 | -255 |

| Previous race: First Race of Series - | SCCA/CART Indy Car Series; 1979 season | Next race: 1979 Gould Twin Dixie 125 |
| Previous race: Not Held - | Arizona Republic / Jimmy Bryan 150 | Next race: 1979 Miller High Life 150 |
