= McLaren M15 =

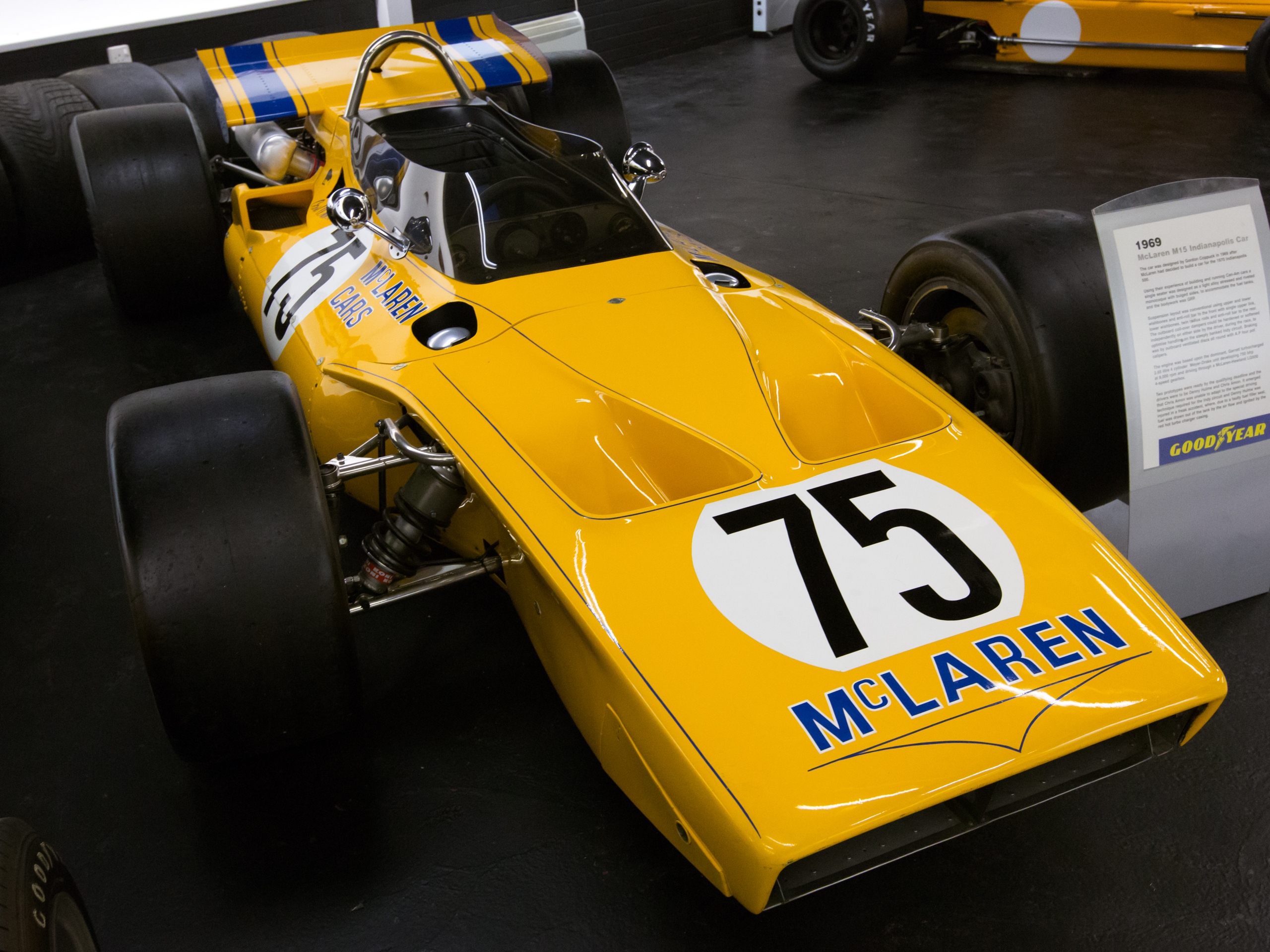
- Category: IndyCar
- Constructor: McLaren Racing
- Designer: Gordon Coppuck
- Successor: McLaren M16

Technical specifications
- Chassis: Aluminium monocoque
- Length: 156 in (396.2 cm)
- Width: 40.2 in (102.1 cm)
- Height: 36 in (91.4 cm)
- Axle track: 57.8 in (146.8 cm) (Front); 58 in (147.3 cm) (Rear)
- Wheelbase: 99 in (251.5 cm)
- Engine: Offenhauser 2,650 cc (161.7 cu in) straight-4 turbocharged Mid-engined, longitudinally mounted
- Transmission: Hewland 4-speed manual
- Power: 650 hp (485 kW); 455 lb⋅ft (617 N⋅m)
- Weight: 1,490 lb (675.9 kg)
- Tyres: Goodyear

Competition history
- Notable entrants: McLaren
- Notable drivers: Denny Hulme

The McLaren M15 was an open-wheel race car designed and built by the McLaren team for a single season of competition in 1970, and was their first attempt at making an Indy car. It was later replaced by the more successful McLaren M16, which went on to win three Indy 500s; in 1972, 1974 and 1976.
