= Model 15 =

Model 15 may refer to:

- Boeing Model 15, a United States single-seat open-cockpit biplane fighter aircraft of the 1920s manufactured by the Boeing company
- Consolidated Model 15, a variant of the O-17 Courier observation and training airplane used by the United States National Guard in the 1920s and 1930s
- Ford Model 15-P, a flying wing aircraft developed by the Stout Metal Airplane Division of the Ford Motor Company in 1935
- Iver Johnson Model 15-7, a motorcycle developed by the Iver Johnson company in 1915
- MG 08/15, a German machine gun used extensively during World War I
- Model 15 mine, a copy of the Soviet POMZ stake mounted anti-personnel fragmentation mine
- Singer Improved Family, known as Model 15, a sewing machine produced by the Singer Manufacturing Company
- Skoda 75 mm Model 15, a mountain gun used by Austria-Hungary in World War I
- Smith & Wesson Model 15, an American revolver
- Swanson Coupe Model W-15, a monoplane produced in 1931 by Swedish aircraft designer and manufacturer Swen Swanson
- Teletype Model 15, a teleprinter made by the Teletype Corporation patented in 1930

== See also ==
- Type 15 (disambiguation)
