= Joe Saldana =

American racing driver

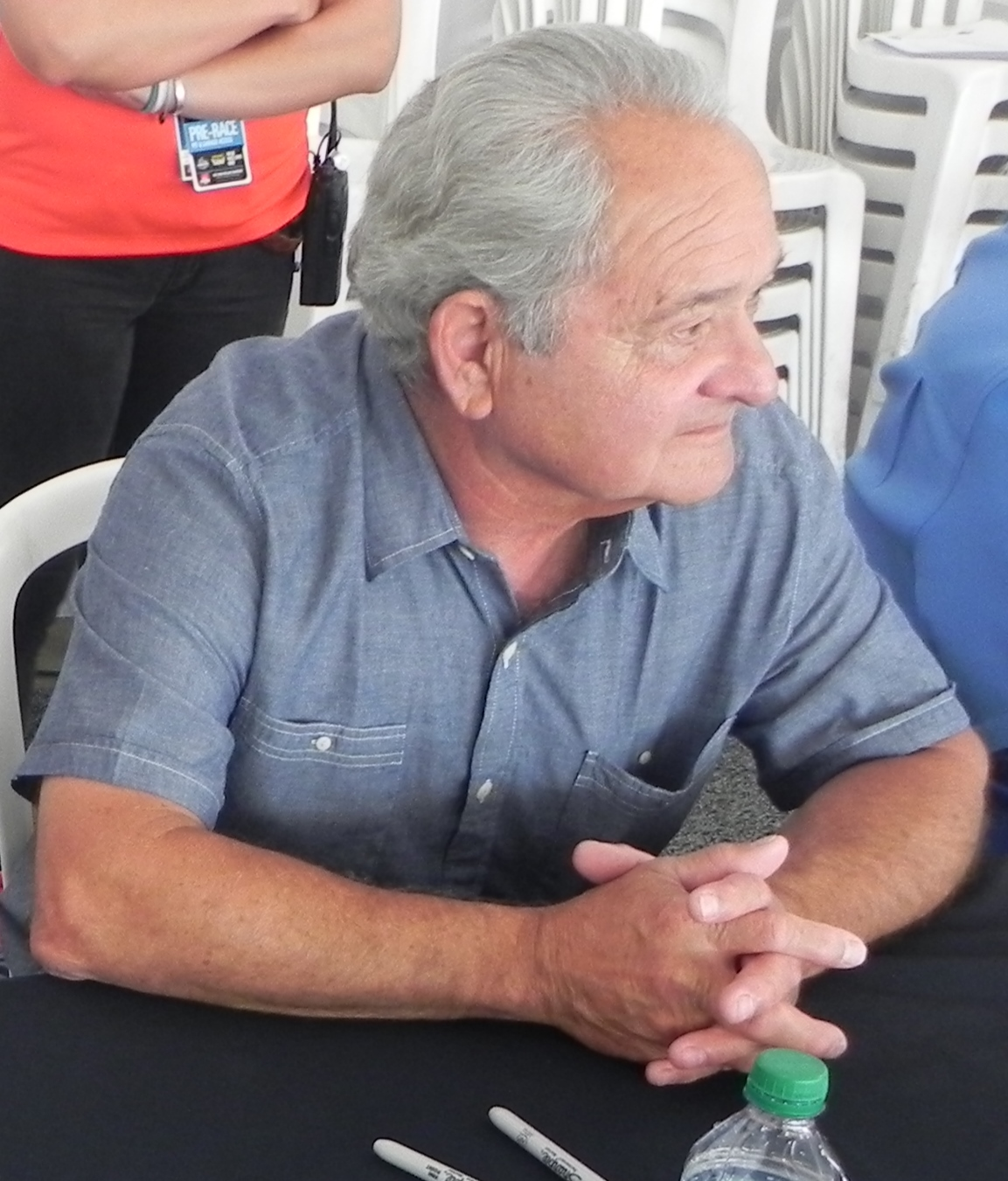
- Saldana at the 2014 Indianapolis 500
- Nationality: American
- Born: November 14, 1944 (age 82); Clay Center, Nebraska, U.S.

Champ Car career
- 18 races run over 2 years
- Years active: 1979–1980
- Team: Hoffman Racing
- Best finish: 16th (1979)
- First race: 1979 Arizona Republic / Jimmy Bryan 150 (Phoenix)
- Last race: 1980 Gould Grand Prix (Michigan)
Wins	Podiums	Poles
0	0	0

Joe Saldana (born November 14, 1944) is an American former open-wheel racing driver.

== Racing career ==
Saldana moved to Lincoln, Nebraska at an early age where he grew up and started his auto racing career. His uncle, Orville Hoffman, along with Buck Fallstead, had modified stock cars and Joe was bit by the racing bug before he was old enough to drive. In 1961 he bought his first car for $500 and he made his debut at Capital Beach Speedway in Lincoln.

By 1964 "Lil' Joe" was winning features in his own creations and by 1967 he was ready to dominate. During the winter, Saldana and master car builder Don Brown constructed the Mechanical Rabbit roadsterstyle sprint car. After a few weeks early in the season sorting out the new car, which was one of three built and raced by Brown, Saldana and Greg Weld, Saldana and his Rabbit went on a tear. He won many features, while finishing second in the Knoxville points to Bill Utz. He set a one-lap record at Knoxville, Iowa, during qualifying at the Knoxville Nationals with a 21.45 second lap. With the lap record in hand, Saldana set out to put a Nationals win in his pocket as well. Everything was going according to plan, with Joe leading easily, until a wheel came off with six laps left. He was able to scramble back to a seventh-place finish after replacing the errant rubber.

Saldana got off to a rocky start in 1968, as he crashed his sleek roadster during the second night of racing at Knoxville on May 4. Saldana injured his wrist in the accident and his Mechanical Rabbit suffered severe front end damage. By mid-June however "Little Joe" had the car back to full song, winning again on a regular basis. His early season crash no doubt cost him the Knoxville point championship, as he narrowly lost to Dick Sutcliffe. In the 1968 Knoxville Nationals, he finished fourth behind Ray Lee Goodwin, Jerry Blundy and Earl Wagner.

The year 1969 brought wins at Eagle and Knoxville and a Big Car Racing Association (BCRA) sprint win at Belleville, Kansas. At the Knoxville Nationals, Saldana held on for a sixth-place finish with Kenny Gritz winning the race. He was able to take the Knoxville season point battle down to the last night, but for the third year in a row, had to settle for second behind Bob Williams.

For 1970, Saldana drove the upright Roger Beck house car, which was owned by John Leverenz and Bill Chadborne. "Little Joe" swept to wins just about everywhere he raced. By the time August rolled around, he was the odds-on favorite to finally get that Knoxville Nationals win he had been seeking for so long. He proceeded to run away with the National Championship race defeating Dick Sutcliffe, Ray Lee Goodwin, and Jan Opperman. He also easily won the Knoxville season point title. In the fall of 1970, Saldana ventured out to California, where he drove the 1969 California Racing Association (CAA) championship winning Ernie Duncan Chevy, and won the Ascot Grand Prix.

As strong a year as 1970 was, Saldana had his sights set on a much loftier goal -the Indianapolis 500. In order to get there, he knew he had to go USAC racing. So in 1971, he went back east to pursue his dream of racing in the Indy 500. He had sprint car rides that year with "Boston Louie" Seymour, Steve Stapp, Robert Ziegler and E.T. Morse.

The year 1972 saw Saldana's first USAC feature win, but oddly enough, it did not come in a sprint car, it was in George Gamester's USAC midget at Champaign, Illinois.

In 1973, Saldana achieved his first USAC Sprint Car Series win at the Tony Hulman Classic, held at the Terre Haute Action Track. Driving for Lloyd Weaver Excavating, he led for 40 laps to win the event, which was broadcast nationally on ABC's Wide World of Sports. He finished ahead of Rollie Beale, Don Nordhorn, Bruce Walkup, and Sammy Sessions.

Saldana moved to the Smith Speed Shop Special of Ray & Cissi Smith for 1974. Although he was close on several occasions, Joe did not manage any wins with the Smith Chevy as the car proved less reliable than desired.

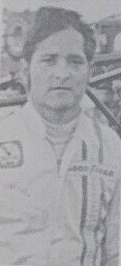
Saldana circa 1975

If 1974 had made Saldana's Indy 500 dream seem further away than ever, 1975 brought it right back into focus. Piloting the powerful Mauri Amerling Chevy, Saldana took back to back wins at the Indy Fairgrounds mile and Terre Haute. The Terre Haute being especially dramatic, with nine lead changes, and Joe finally taking to the cushion for the victory. Then, in mid-July, just as he was looking like a serious title contender, Joe dumped his ride hard at Eldora. Joe wasn't hurt in the mishap, but the Amerling car was out of commission for the rest of the year. Saldana was able to land a ride in one of Don Siebert's sprinters, and even score his first pavement win in the car at St. Paul, Minn., but faded to seventh in the final USAC points. Joe also started making some Indy car connections in 1975, crewing for A.J. Watson at Indy, that year.

September 1976 saw Saldana record the biggest win of his career in the Hoosier Hundred dirt champ car race. Joe ran solidly in the top ten until the 51st lap, when a crash involving several front running cars, caused a red flag. Severe injuries to family friend Jan Opperman overshadowed a great duel between Saldana and A.J. Foyt once the race resumed. Saldana had the lead on the restart with Foyt taking the lead on the high side on lap 63. Joe fought back however, and when Foyt bobbled and caught the first turn fence four laps later, Saldana took his Ron Killman-Lloyd Weaver dirt champ car to the lead for good. Foyt held on for second, followed by Sheldon Kinser, Cassella, and Jim Hurtubise. On the strength of his Hoosier run, Joe was fifth in the 1976 USAC Dirt Champ standings, right behind Cassella, Parsons, Kinser, and Larry Rice.

Saldana broke into the Indianapolis Motor Speedway in 1977. Driving the Ralph Wilke Leader Cards Eagle-Offy wrenched by A.J.Watson, Joe breezed through his rookie test and qualified at 184.596 mph, only to be bumped from that race.

Finally in 1978, the dream became reality, with Saldana qualifying Gus & Dick Hoffman's Mr. WizeBuys Carpet Eagle-Offy solidly in the field at 190.809 mph. Saldana ran steadily all day and came home 15th, collecting $20,690 for his efforts. Although they didn't run the entire Championship Trail, the Saldana-Hoffman combo made most of the events, with top tens at Michigan (9th), Atlanta (10th), College Station, Texas (10th), and Michigan again (10th). Also in 1978, USAC scheduled two road course races on consecutive weekends in Great Britain. Saldana and the Hoffman Racing Team were invited to both of these. At the first race in Silverstone, England, Joe dropped out with a burned valve. One week later, at Brands Hatch, however, "Little Joe" brought the Hoffman car home tenth.

In 1979, Championship Auto Racing Teams (CART) had split away from USAC, with each group running their own series. The KBHL/Nebraska/Hoffman team decided to race with CART, which was the tougher of the two circuits. Saldana was again to be their driver, and he came up with some great efforts in making all the races. He again made the Indy 500 with a 188.788 mph run, and checkered 16th on race day. It was mid-summer when the team hit its stride, running tenth and eighth in a Michigan double-header, 8th at Trenton, N.J., and sixth at Atlanta. He finished sixteenth in the CART Championship standings. Saldana also won a USAC midget event at the Eldora Speedway that year.

The bubble burst, in 1980, as Saldana and the Hoffman team could not muster the speed for a third straight Indy 500 appearance, and they missed the big show. Running selected races due to a limited budget, Saldana's best, and only, Indy car finish in 1980 was a 12th at Milwaukee in August.

Although the Indy car deal was a disappointment, it was good news for dirt track fans, as it meant a stepped up program in that department for "Little Joe". He claimed one win, at Terre Haute, and five other top five finishes, while steering the Snell Brothers car to ninth in the season standings. Saldana ran all the 1980 USAC Dirt Champ shows wheeling the Johnson Sheet Metal Chevy, he finished ninth for the season.

The year 1981 again found Saldana out of the Indy after banging the wall in Hoffman's car. He followed that by practicing one of the Leader Cards machines, but never made a qualifying attempt.

By now, Saldana's sprint car tail-tank-building business (Plastic Racing Tanks) was limiting his racing somewhat, and he only made a few USAC sprint shows. Driving the Tipp Machine & Tool Special, he did win on the Indy Fairgrounds mile.

Saldana did make all the USAC dirt champ races in the Johnson Sheet Metal Special with a fifth place at Springfield, Illinois as his best effort. He ended up in eighth for the year.

The year 1982 was to be Saldana's final attempt at the Indy 500. After Tom Bigelow stepped out of Dick Hammond's Genesee Beer Wagon, Saldana tried to get the car up to speed, but missed the show once more. Following Indy, they tried to qualify for both the Milwaukee and Cleveland CART races but missed both. Saldana crashed heavily on Cleveland's Burke Airport road course, escaping injuries.

Driving the Snell Bros. Tipp Machine & Tool car on the Silver Crown (Dirt Champ) Trail in 1982, Saldana had a fine year. Although unable to nail down any wins, he did finish second at Springfield behind Bobby Olivero and had two other top five finishes en route to sixth in the final standings.

In 1983, Saldana won at Eldora again driving in Bert Emick's All Star Circuit of Champions (ASCoC).

In February 1984, Saldana ventured to Florida for the East Bay Nationals, and won the feature on the third night of the All Star action. In another rare 1984 sprint car appearance, Joe jumped into Johnny Vance's Aristocrat Special and showed the kids the fast way around the mile at Indy, beating Larry Rice and Johnny Parsons. Saldana also won the Silver Crown 100-lap race at Du Quion, Illinois, on Labor Day driving Mauri Amerling's car after Ron Shuman blew his tire on the last lap.

1985 was Saldana's 25th and final season on the speedways, but he did not just coast through his last summer of driving. Finishing 10th at Tampa, and eighth at the Indy Fairgrounds in his first two Silver Crown starts. A sixth-place finish at Indianapolis Raceway Park prior to a promising night at the Oklahoma City State Fairgrounds while leading the first 24 laps ended with engine woes. Saldana then ran fourth at the West Virginia Motor Speedway Silver Crown race after starting 20th. At Springfield, Saldana set a new one-lap track record of 31 .144 and then finished second when he was barely beaten to the flag in the 100 lapper by Chuck Gurney. He lined up third for the Ted Horn 100 at Du Quion, IL, but finished 20th. Saldana had another fast time at the Hoosier Hundred, but tire and motor problems relegated him to ninth at the end. In Saldana's last run before hanging up the goggles, he qualified 4th and finished ninth at the 4-Crown Nationals at Eldora Speedway, near Rossburg, Ohio, in October 1985. Saldana finished a close fourth in the Silver Crown Championship in 1985 driving the Mauri Amerling #4. Saldana finished his USAC career with eight sprint car, two Silver Crown, and two Midget wins.

About retirement, Saldana had this to say, "I just decided that if I could be lucky enough to complete my twenty-fifth year, I'd be satisfied." He says in retrospect, "I've been extremely fortunate during the past twenty-five years and the fact that there was no family pressure to make the decision, made it much easier."

In looking back on the past 25 years, Saldana easily points to the 1978 Indy 500 as the highlight of his racing career. "That first lap at Indy was something, with all those thousands of faces in the stands, but you know the next lap wasn't so bad and from then on it was just 'go racing' and it’s been that way ever since. I've been pretty lucky during my career and look back to highlights like the 1970 Knoxville Nationals, the 1973 Tony Hulman Classic and the 1976 Hoosier Hundred with a sense of accomplishment."

== Personal life ==
Saldana is married to Susie, who went to the same high school as he did in Lincoln, and they have three children: Laurie, Amy, and former World of Outlaws sprint car driver Joey Saldana.

Joe and Susie continue to live in Brownsburg, Indiana, where he has successfully built a racing oriented industrial development complex.

== Knoxville Nationals results ==
Year	A-Main Start	A-Main Finish
1965	17th	8th
1967	1st	7th
1968	7th	4th
1969	6th	6th
1970	1st	1st
1976	1st	5th
1977	C-Main	DNS
1980	14th	22nd
1981	DNS *	DNS
1983	B-Main	DNS

- 1981 Qualified for the Main by winning the B-Main, but engine trouble prevented him from starting the race

== Awards ==
- Nebraska Auto Racing Hall of Fame in 1998
- National Sprint Car Hall of Fame in 2000
- Hoosier Auto Racing Fans Hall of Fame in 2016.

== Indianapolis 500 results ==
Year	Car	Qualifying	Start	Rank	Finish	Laps	Led	Retired	Winnings
1978	Mr. Wize Buys Carpet Shop #69	190.809	24	21	15	173	0	Flagged	$20,691
1979	KBHL/Spirit of Nebraska #69	188.778	26	7	16	186	0	Flagged	$24,467
