= Penske PC-6 =

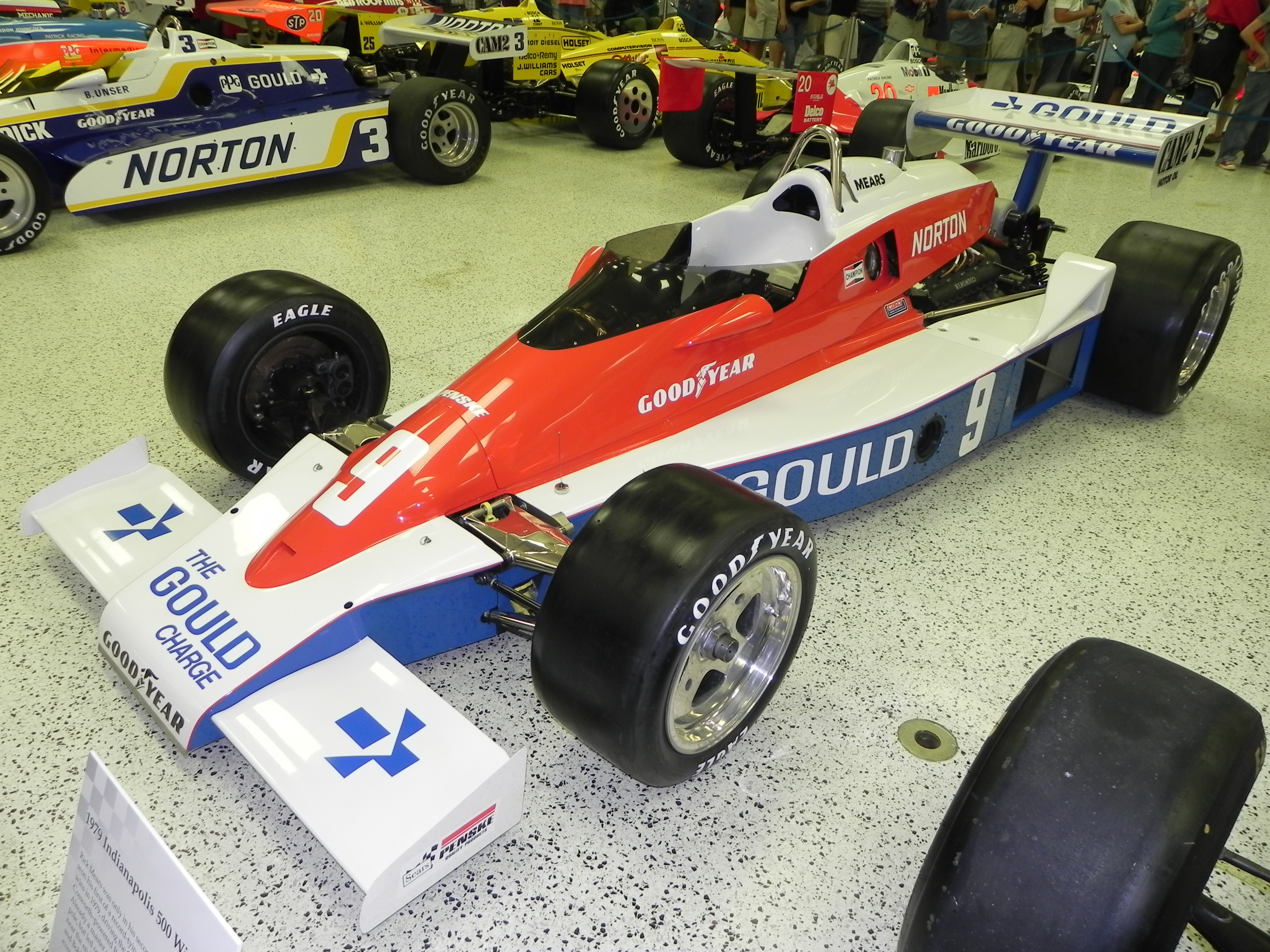
- Category: USAC/CART IndyCar
- Constructor: Penske
- Designer: Geoff Ferris
- Predecessor: Penske PC-5
- Successor: Penske PC-7

Technical specifications
- Chassis: Aluminum Monocoque
- Suspension (front): Top rocker arms; wide-based lower wishbones; inboard coil spring/damper units with varying shocks
- Suspension (rear): Parallel lower links; single top links; twin radius rods; outboard coil spring/damper units with varying shocks
- Length: 3810mm (150in) without wing/drivetrain
- Width: 2032mm (80in)
- Height: 1016mm (40in) without wing, at roll hoop
- Axle track: Front track 1,549mm (61in); Rear track 1,575mm (62in)
- Wheelbase: 2,692mm (106in)
- Engine: Cosworth DFX 2,650 cc (161.7 cu in) V8 80° 76.2mm (3in) Garret AiResearch Turbocharged Mid-engined, longitudinally mounted
- Transmission: Hewland L.G.500 4 speed with reverse gear removed manual
- Power: 800–1,000 hp (600–750 kW)
- Weight: 1,603 lb (727.1 kg)
- Fuel: Methanol, supplied by Mobil
- Tires: Goodyear Eagle Speedway Specials - Rear 27.0x14.5-15 - Front 25.5x10.0-15

Competition history
- Notable entrants: Penske Racing
- Notable drivers: Rick Mears; Tom Sneva; Mario Andretti
- Debut: 1978 Indianapolis 500
- First win: 1979 Indianapolis 500
- Last win: 1979 Indianapolis 500
- Last event: Duman's Turn 4 Restorations Indy (known)
Entries	Races	Wins	Podiums
1978 Indianapolis 500 1979 Indianapolis 500 1980 Indianapolis 500 DT4R Indianapolis (known)	3 (known) 1978 Indianapolis 500 1979 Indianapolis 500 1980 Indianapolis 500	1 (known) 1979 Indianapolis 500	1978 Indianapolis 500 1979 Indianapolis 500 (known)
Poles	F/Laps		
3	1		

The Penske PC-6 is a USAC and CART open-wheel race car, designed by British designer Geoff Ferris at Penske Racing, which was constructed for competition in the 1978 season. It won the 1979 Indianapolis 500, being driven by Rick Mears.

== Background ==
The Penske PC-6 was introduced to racing in 1978 at the 62nd Indianapolis 500, driven by Tom Sneva, Rick Mears, Mario Andretti, and Larry Dickson. It would place 2nd, later going on to achieve 1st place at the 1979 Indy 500 with Rick Mears behind the wheel, cementing his Gould Charge #9 livery as one of the most famed on the PC-6. Other drivers would later try out the car, like Dennis Firestone, albeit without much success. From this point on not much is known about the PC-6. It may not have raced at all until more recent recreational races.

== Notable achievements ==
Tom Sneva made history in his Penske PC-6 qualifying at the Indianapolis Motor Speedway in 1978, setting a record four-lap average speed of over 200 miles per hour that became- and still is- a famous milestone of automotive racing. While laps crossing 200 miles per hour had been achieved at the speedway, none had been done on a hot track, though many had tried. Sneva also set the record for the first official lap crossing 200 miles per hour at the Indy 500 just one year prior, albeit in a McLaren M24 owned by Roger Penske.

== Photo Gallery ==
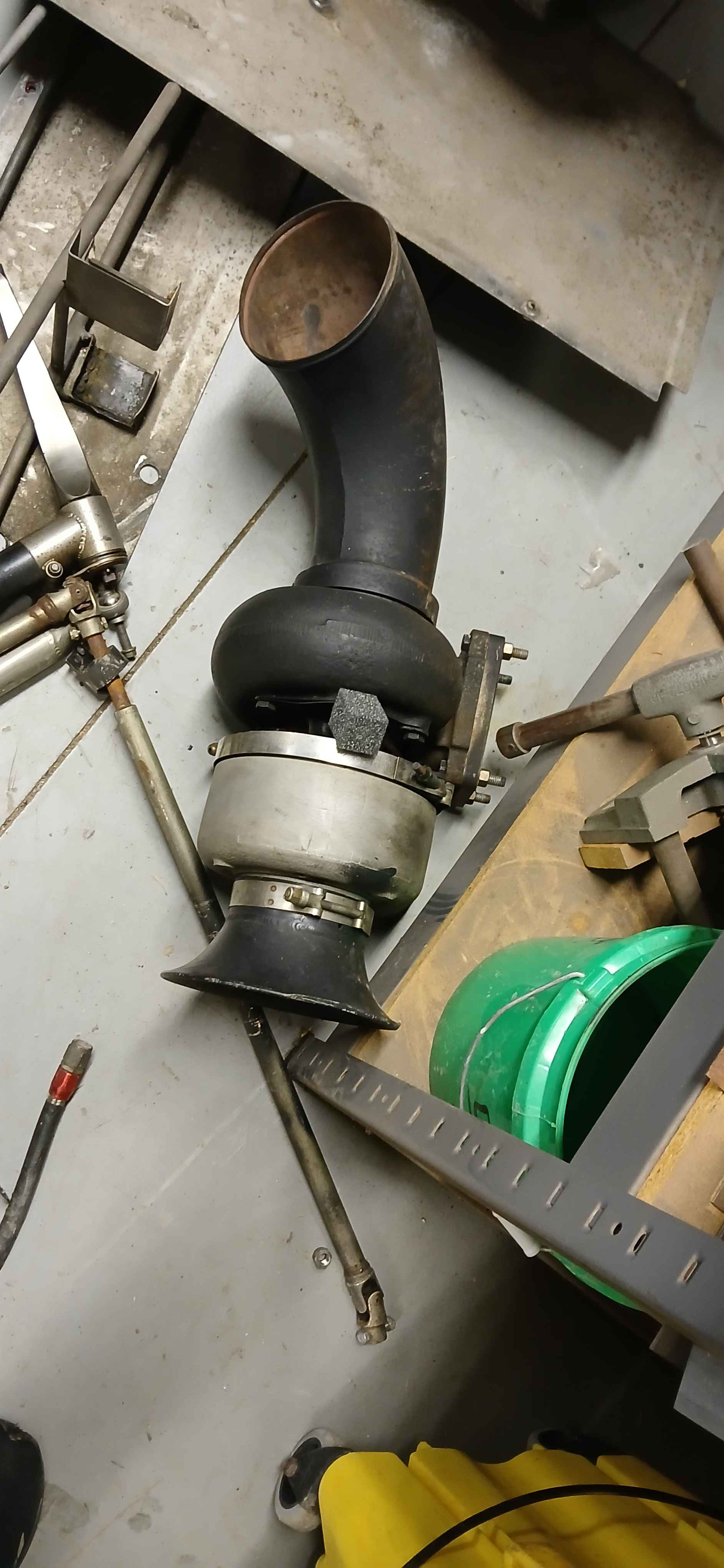
A turbocharger from the 1978 Penske PC-6 Chassis #5 during restoration

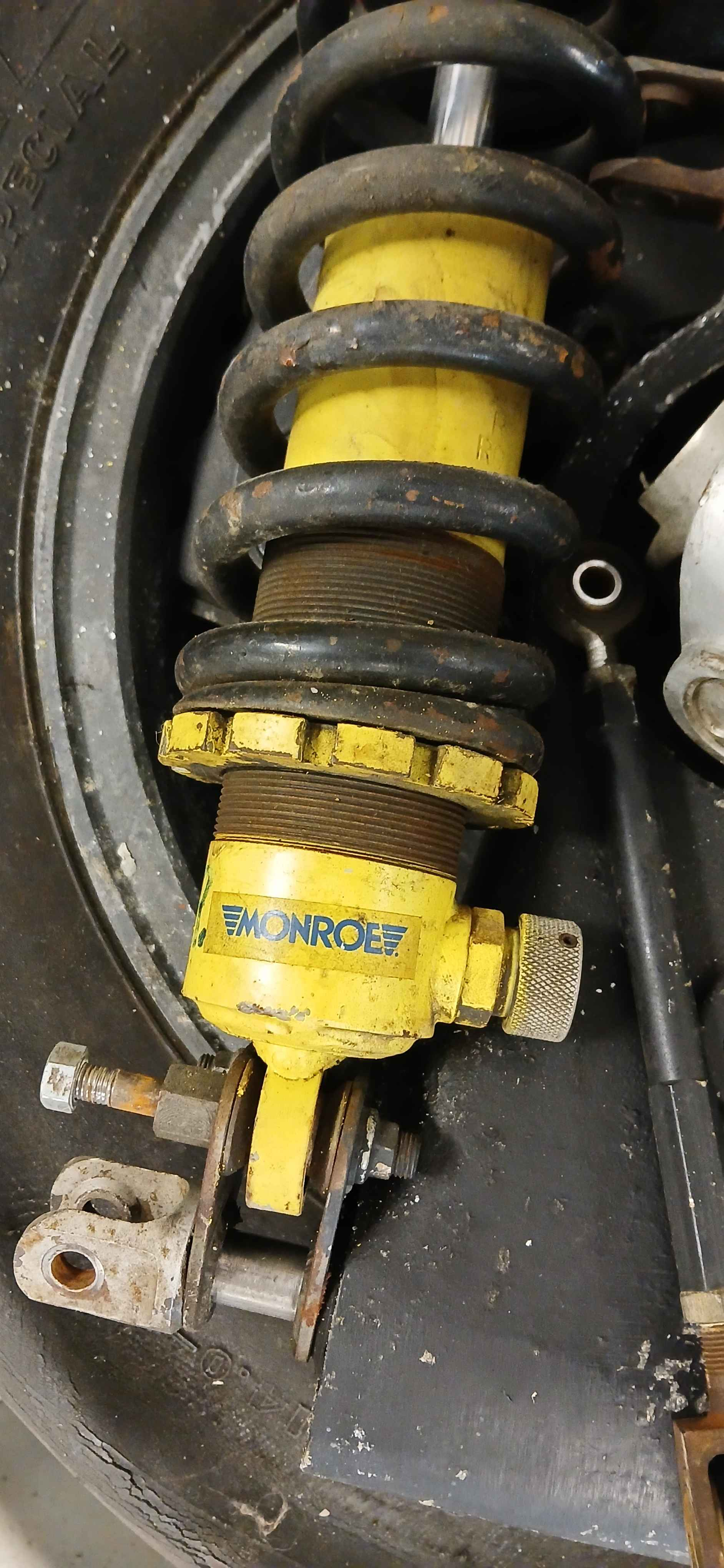
A coilover from the 1978 Penske PC-6 Chassis #5
