= Type RO 15 =

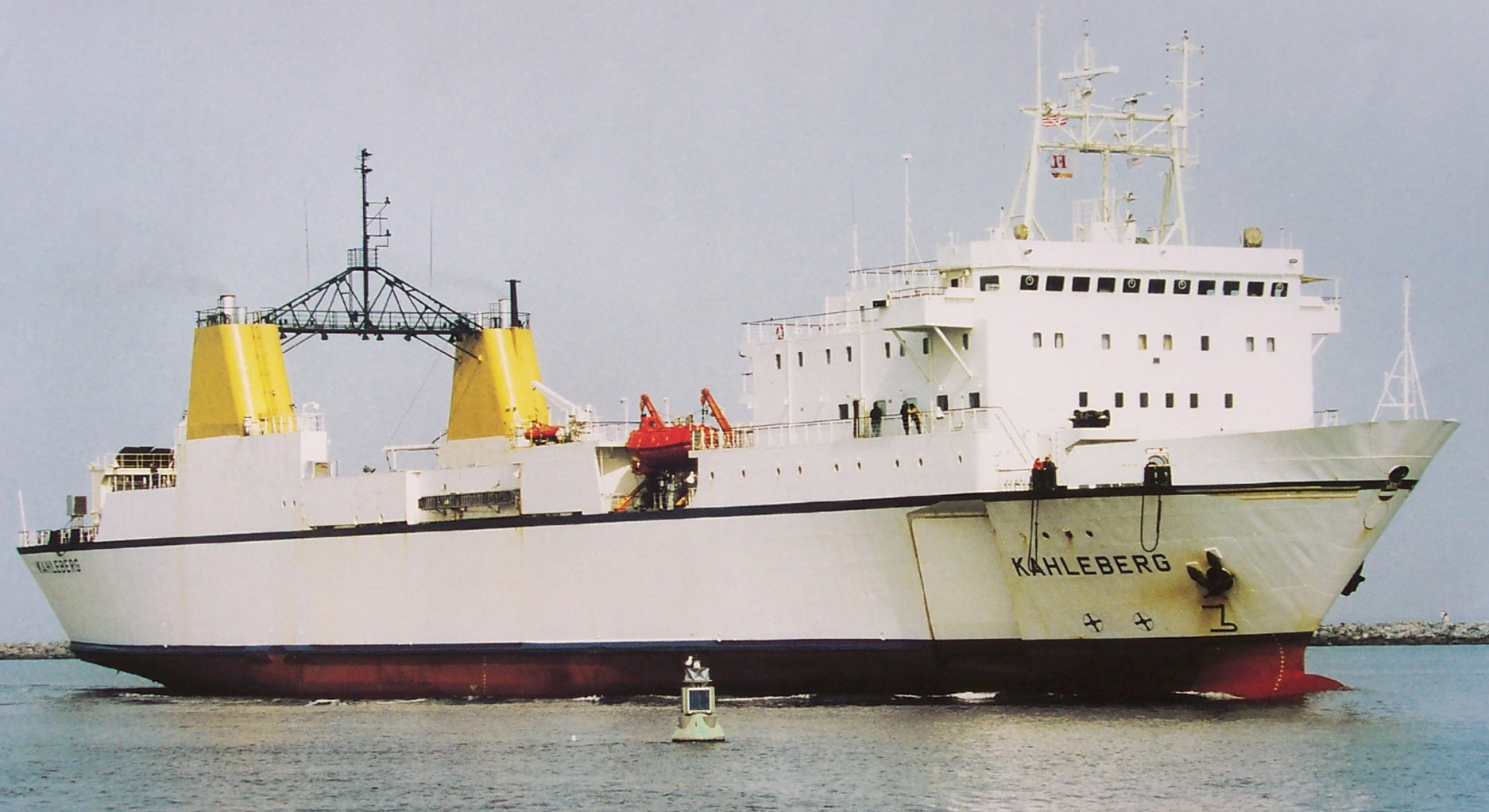
The Kahleberg

Cargo ships of the class Type RO 15 are RoRo vessels built by Wismar's Mathias Thesen Yard.

== History ==
The class was built in 1982/83 and consists of 3 units.

- The first ship of the class was the Gleichberg handed over to the Deutsche Seereederei in July 1982 with works number 150.
- In June 1983 its sister ship, the Auersberg followed. It was re-christened Pasewalk in 1999 and Caribbean Carrier in 2005. The Caribbean Carrier arriving in Alang on 6 January 2011.
- The last of the trio was the Kahleberg, delivered in October 1983 with works number 152. The ship was converted in 1992 to a RoPax ferry. Since 2005 it has been named the RG 1.

== Ships of the class ==
- 1982 Gleichberg
- 1983 Auersberg
- 1983 Kahleberg

== Literature ==
- Klaus-Detlev Westphal (1984), Lothar Hitzinger (ed.), "Ro-Ro Gleichberg", Jahrbuch der Schiffahrt (in German), Berlin: Transpress Verlag, pp. 38–45, ISSN 0075-238X
- Autorenkollektiv (2004), Deutsche Reedereien Band 23 : VEB Deutsche Seereederei Rostock (in German), Bad Segeberg: Verlag Gert Uwe Detlefsen, ISBN 3-928473-81-6

== See also ==
- Class leader
- List of boat types
