= Penske PC-5 =

- Category: USAC IndyCar
- Constructor: Penske
- Designer: Geoff Ferris
- Predecessor: None
- Successor: Penske PC-6

Technical specifications
- Chassis: Aluminum Monocoque
- Suspension: Inboard springs and Fox shocks front and rear, operated by top rocker arm with front and lower rear A arms of streamline tubing
- Engine: Cosworth DFX 2,650 cc (161.7 cu in) V8 80° Mid-engined, longitudinally mounted
- Transmission: Hewland L.G.500 4 speed manual
- Power: 800 hp (600 kW)
- Weight: 1,550 lb (703.1 kg)
- Fuel: Methanol, supplied by Mobil
- Tyres: Goodyear Eagle Speedway Specials - Rear 27.0x14.5-15 - Front 25.5x10.0-15

Competition history
- Notable entrants: Penske Racing
- Notable drivers: Tom Sneva

The Penske PC-5 was Penske Racing's first USAC Indy car. It was designed by British designer Geoff Ferris, and was constructed for competition in the 1977 season. Having driven the car for the latter part of the season, Tom Sneva won the team's first championship. It was notably the first time Penske used its own chassis at the Indy 500, and the first car to clock a qualifying single-lap record of over 200 mph (320 km/h) at Indianapolis Motor Speedway.
