= McLaren M24 =

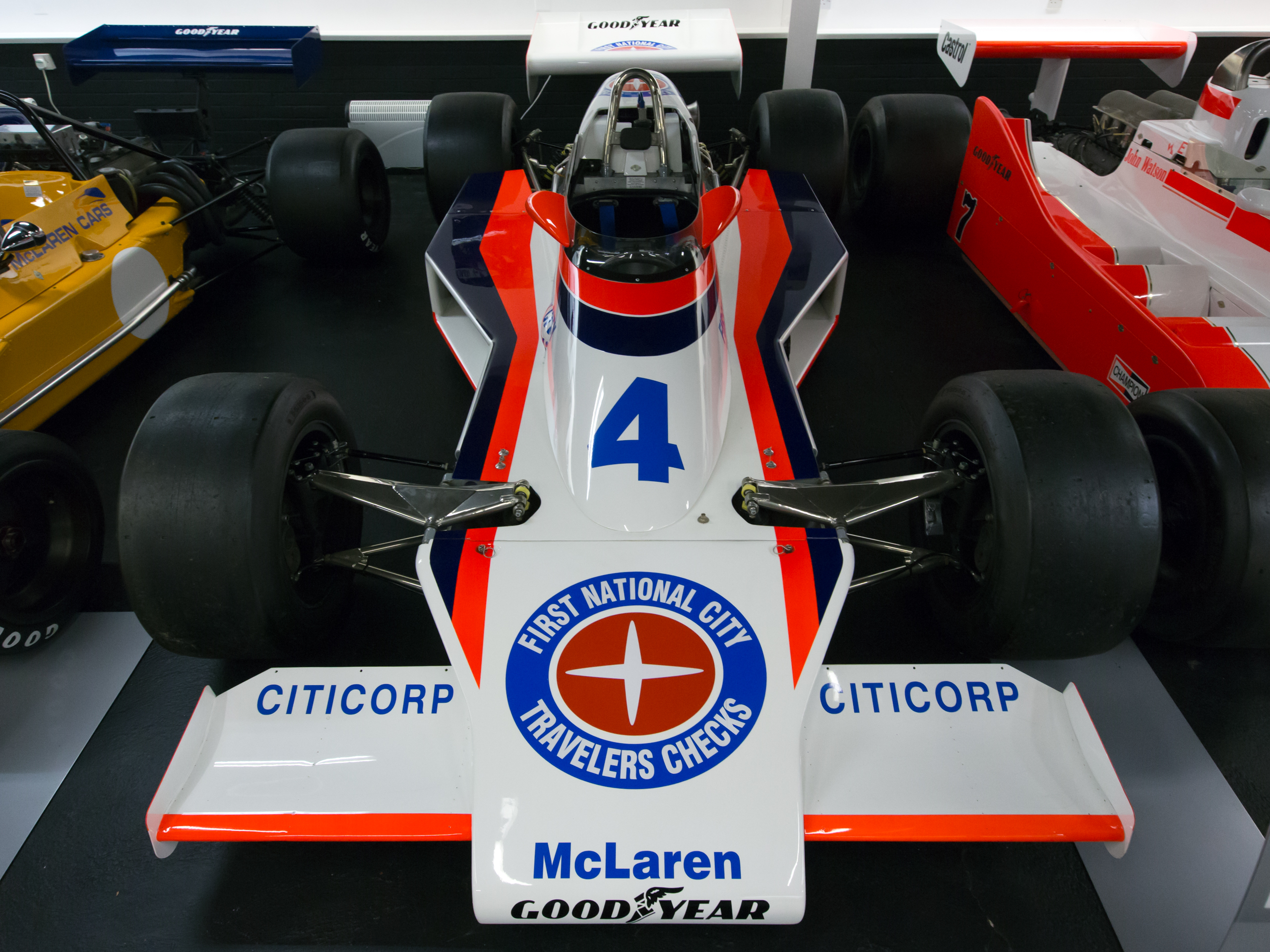
- Category: IndyCar
- Constructor: McLaren Racing
- Designers: Gordon Coppuck; John Barnard
- Predecessor: McLaren M16

Technical specifications
- Chassis: Aluminium monocoque
- Engine: Ford-Cosworth DFX 2,650 cc (161.7 cu in) V8 turbocharged Mid-engined, longitudinally mounted
- Transmission: Hewland 3-speed manual
- Tyres: Goodyear

Competition history
- Notable entrants: McLaren; Penske Racing
- Notable drivers: Johnny Rutherford; Tom Sneva

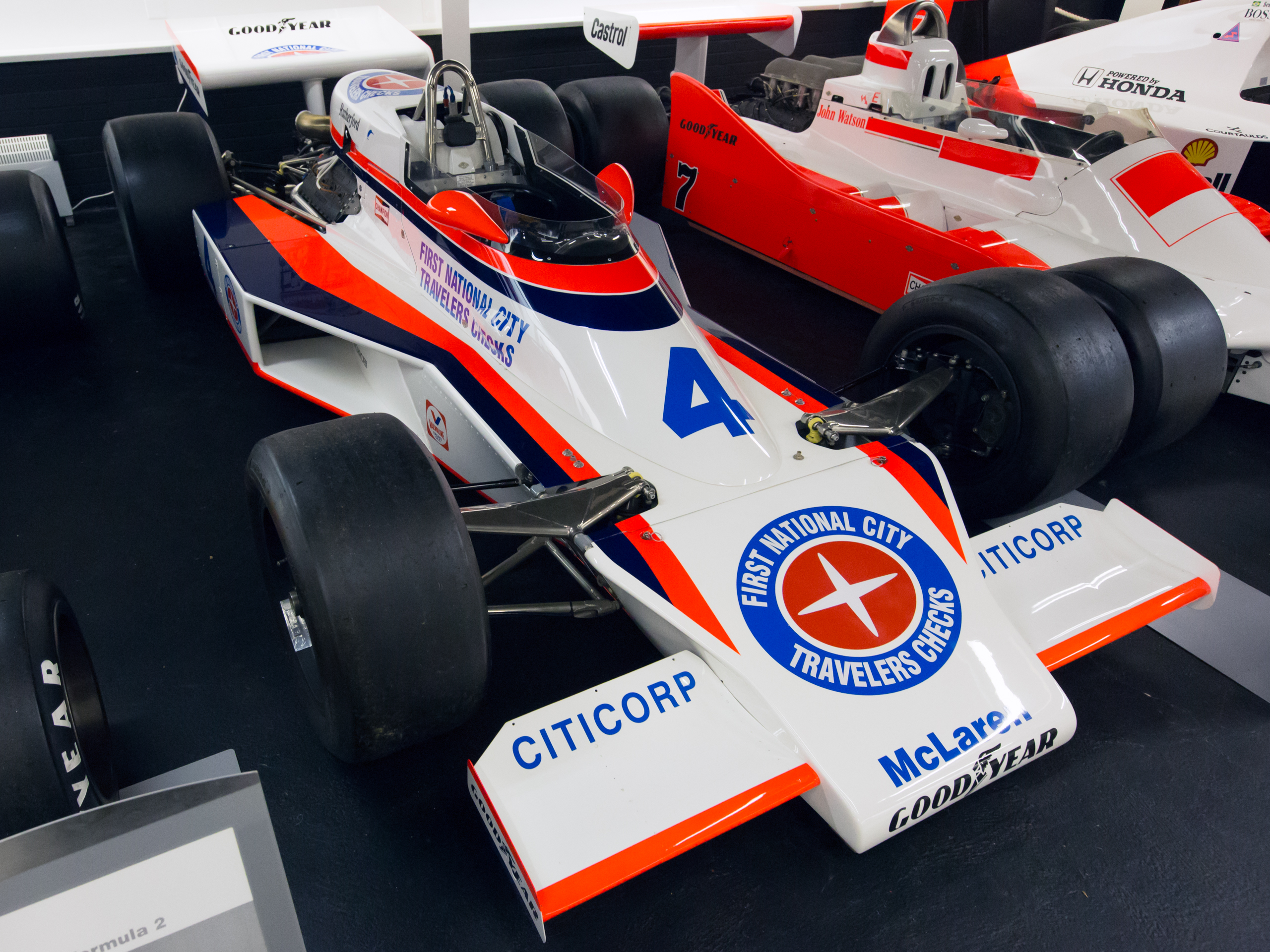
McLaren M24 front-right Donington Grand Prix Collection

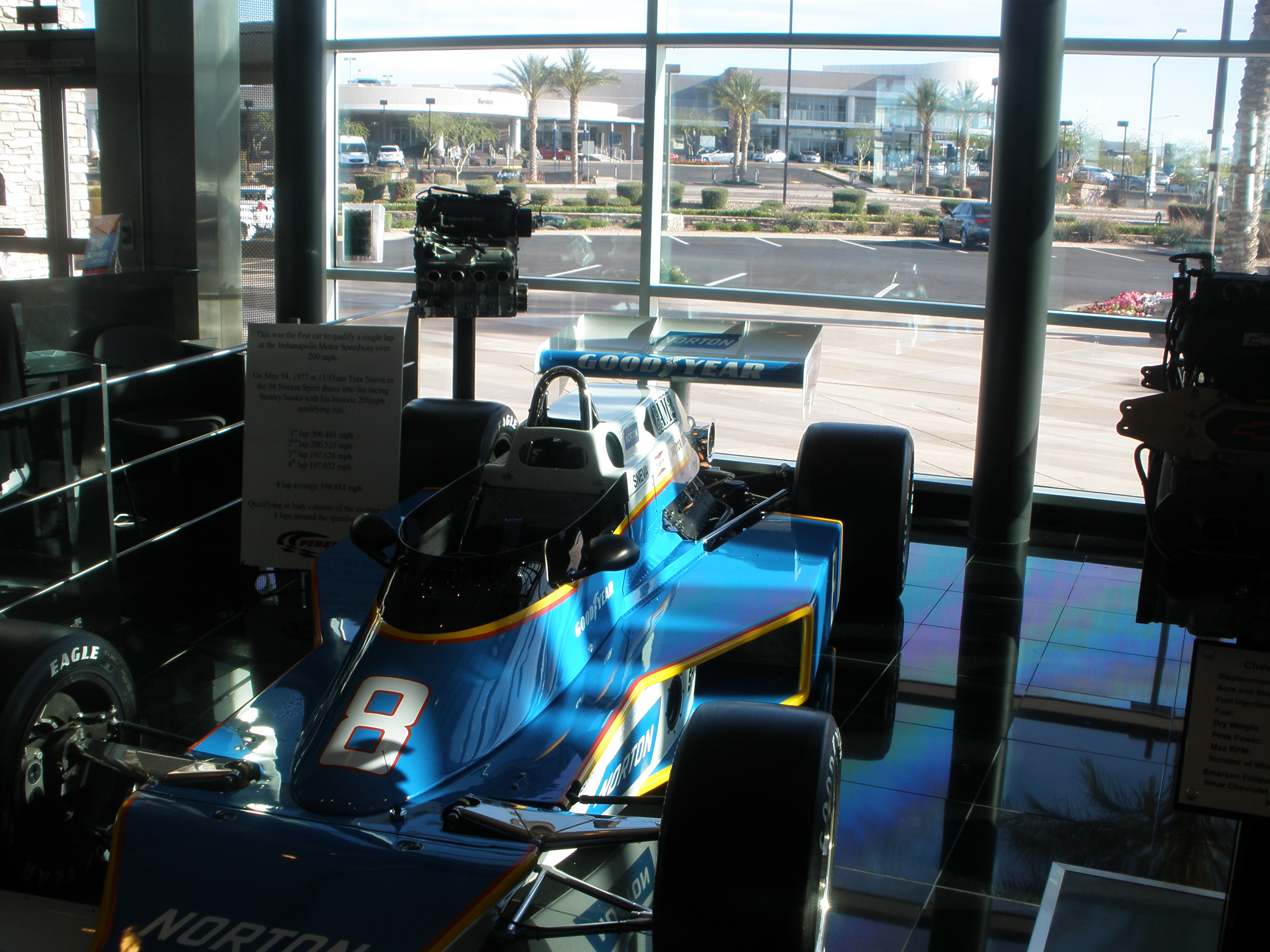
Tom Sneva's 1977 car

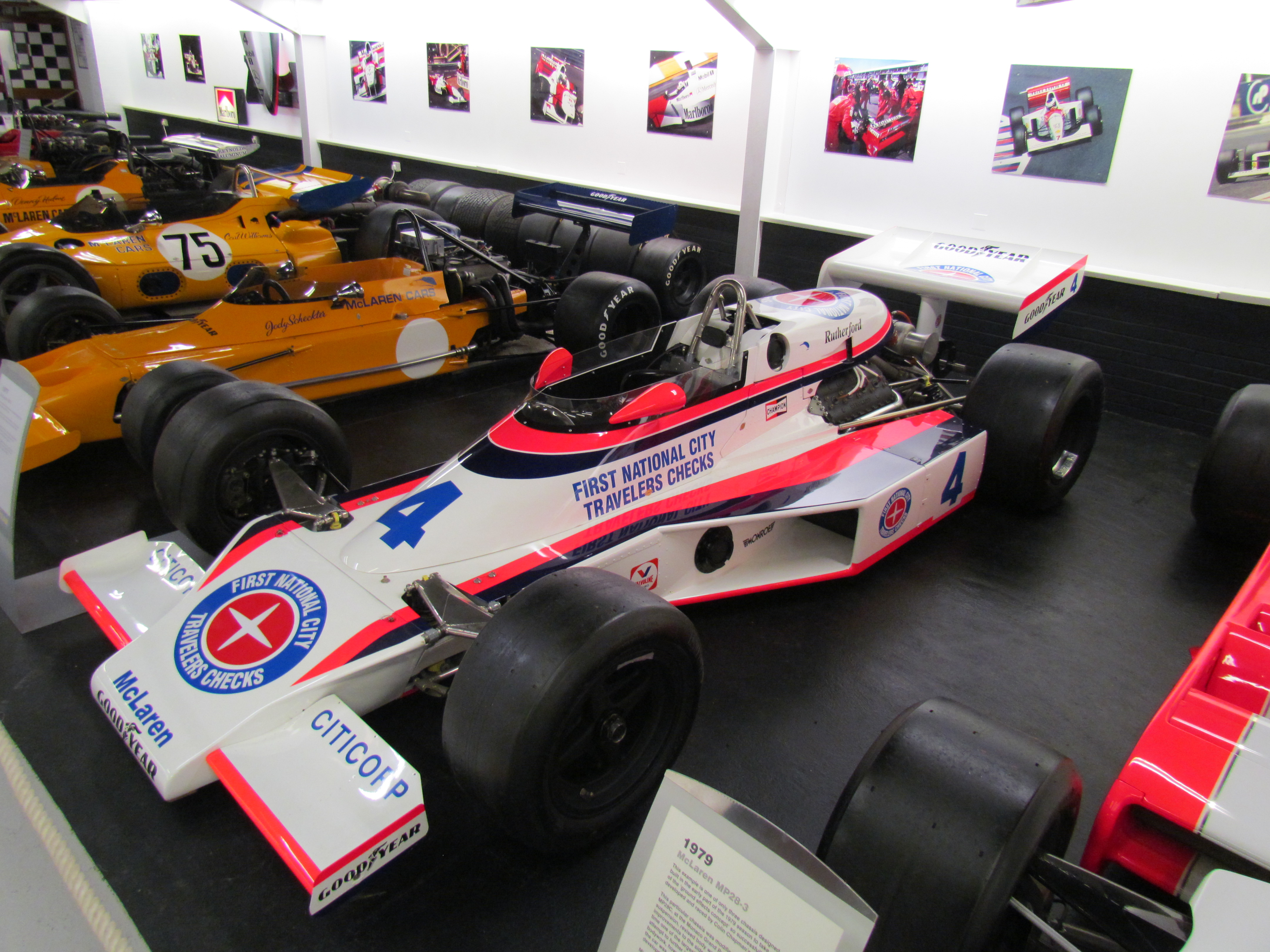
1977 Mclaren M24

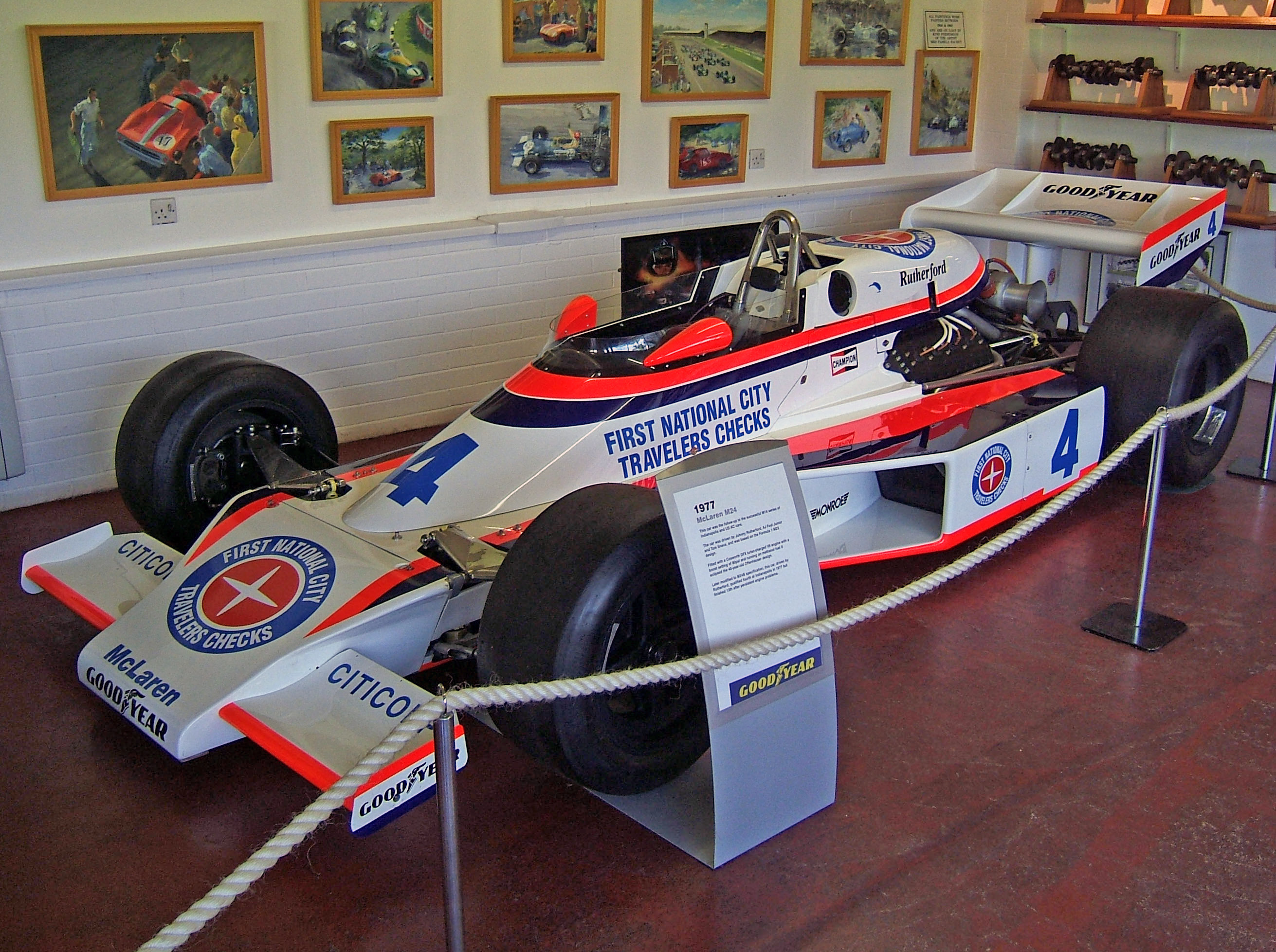
The M24 took design cues and features from the successful M23 Formula One car

The McLaren M24 was a race car designed and built by McLaren between 1977 and 1979 for Indy car racing.

M24 was also the last-ever McLaren IndyCar car to date before McLaren decided to withdraw from CART IndyCar World Series after 1979 USAC Championship Car and SCCA/CART Indy Car Series seasons respectively due to concentrating on Formula One programme.
