= McLaren M16 =

McLaren M16 McLaren M16A McLaren M16B McLaren M16C McLaren M16C/D McLaren M16E
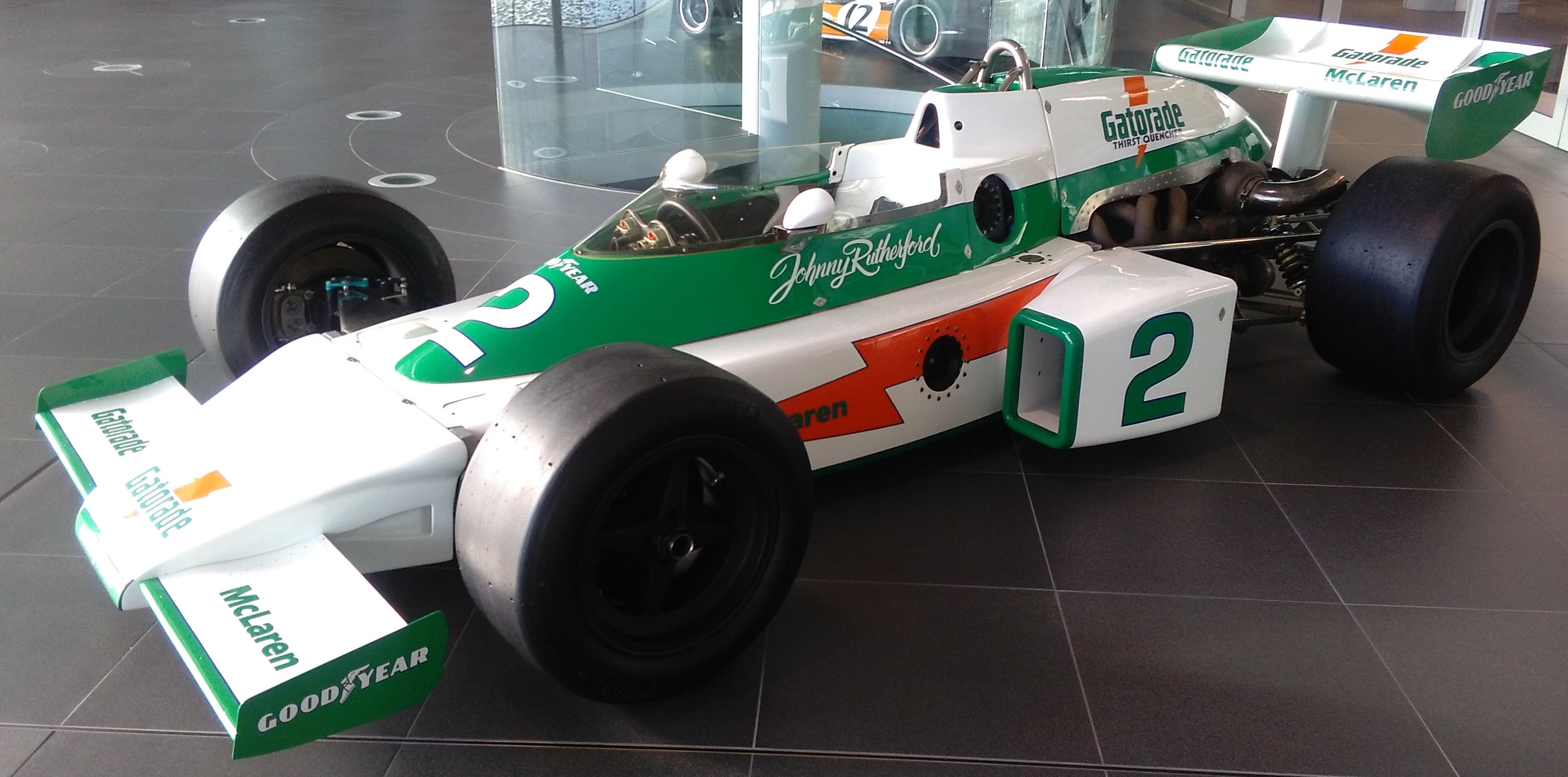
- McLaren M16E driven by Johnny Rutherford in 1975
- Category: IndyCar
- Constructor: McLaren Racing
- Designers: Gordon Coppuck; John Barnard
- Predecessor: McLaren M15
- Successor: McLaren M24

Technical specifications
- Chassis: Aluminium monocoque
- Engine: Offenhauser 2,610 cc (159.3 cu in) straight-4 turbocharged Mid-engined, longitudinally mounted
- Transmission: Hewland 3 manual
- Tyres: Goodyear

Competition history
- Notable entrants: McLaren; Penske Racing
- Notable drivers: Johnny Rutherford; Mark Donohue; Denny Hulme; Peter Revson; Gary Bettenhausen
Wins
Indianapolis 500 1972, 1974, 1976

The McLaren M16 was a race car designed and built by McLaren between 1971 and 1976 for American open wheel racing. It is the most successful car of the 1970s at the Indianapolis 500 with three wins in 1972, 1974 and 1976 and the last one to win with the Offenhauser engine.

== History ==
=== 1971 ===
The car was unveiled in January 1971 to replace the M15. Initially named simply M16, the 1971 version is known retrospectively as M16A due to the successive updates. The chassis is an aluminium monocoque powered by the omnipresent at the time Offenhauser straight-4 engine, which in its 159 c.i. (2.61l) version and equipped with a Garrett turbocharger limited to 24.6 psi (1.7 bar) delivered over 700 hp. Following a trend set in Formula 1 the previous year by the Lotus 72, the radiators were moved to the sidepods giving the car a wedge shape. Two cars driven by Denny Hulme and Peter Revson entered the Indianapolis 500 under the McLaren team and one more car run by Penske and driven by Mark Donohue. The three cars made the qualified in the top 4, but only Revson managed to finish the race in second place.

=== 1972 ===
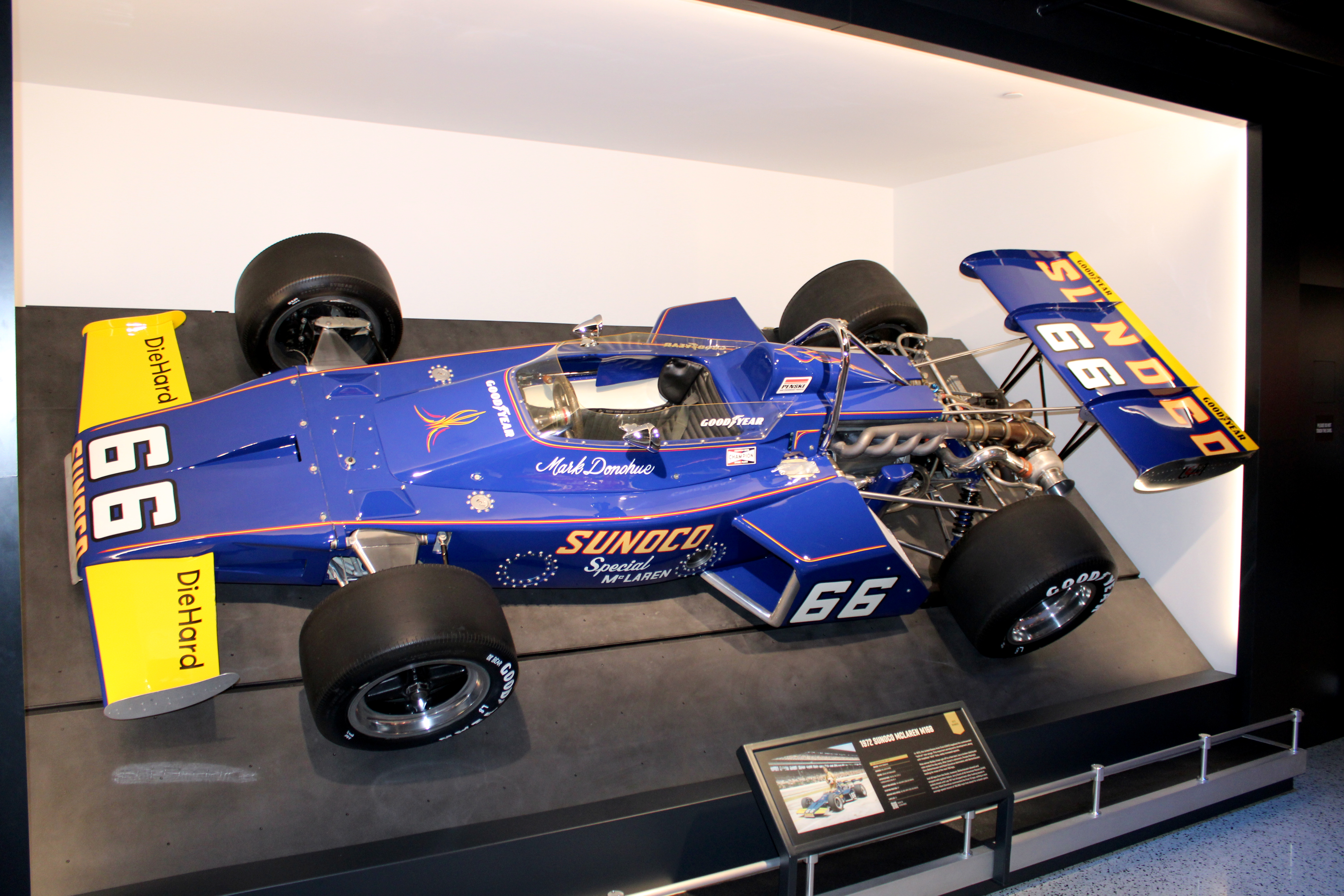
The McLaren M16B used by Penske Racing to win the 1972 Indianapolis 500

The new car was baptized as M16B. For that year's Indy 500 Gordon Johncock replaced Denny Hulme and Penske entered a second car for Gary Bettenhausen. Although none of those three crossed the finish line, Mark Donohue did so in the first place, making the car the first McLaren to win the famous race and also giving Penske their first of a long list of victories at Indy.

=== 1973 ===
The M16C saw Johnny Rutherford joining the official team.

=== 1974 ===
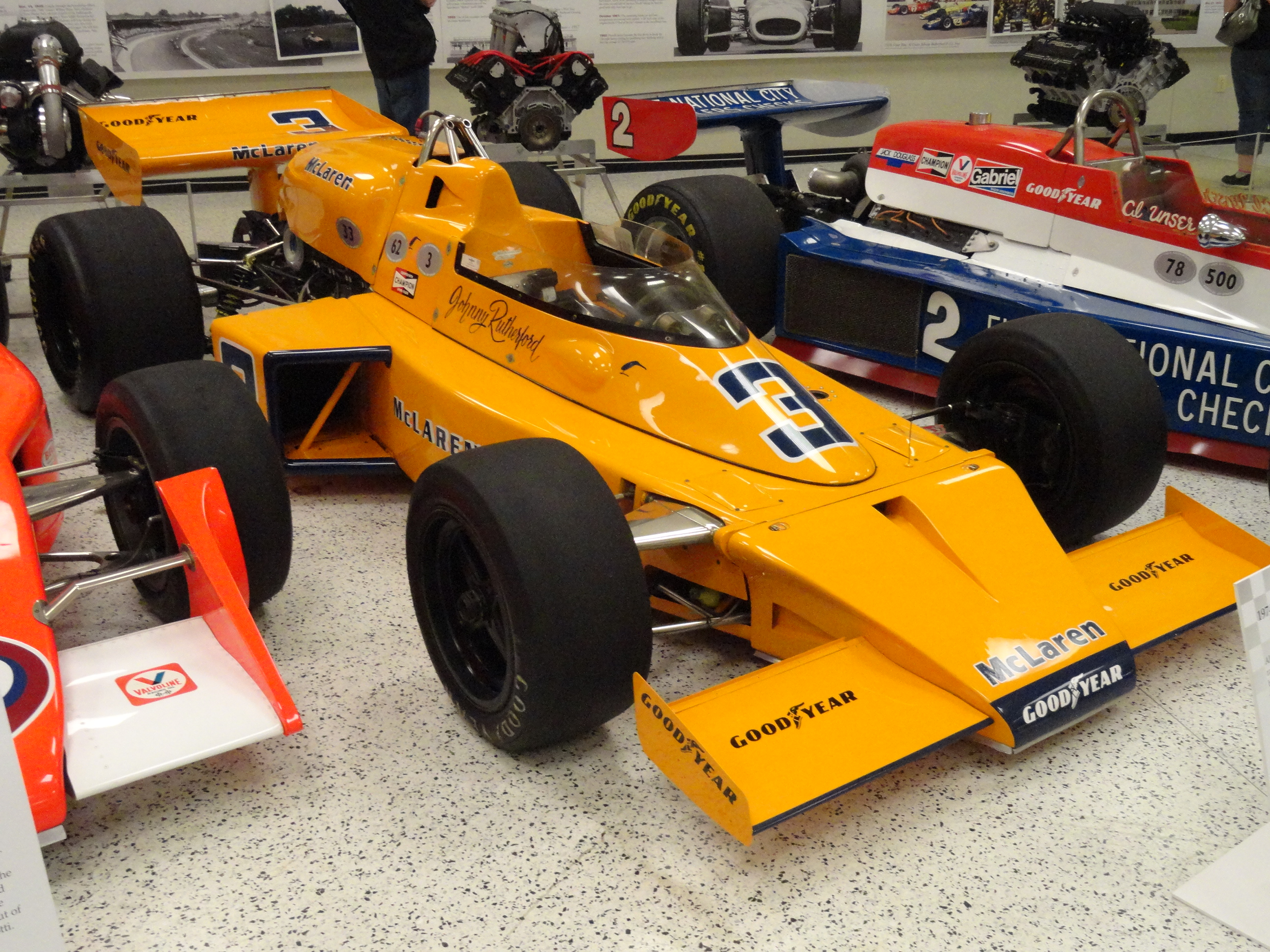
McLaren's winning car for the 1974 Indianapolis 500

Johnny Rutherford won both the Indianapolis 500 and Pocono 500 and finished 2nd in the USAC championship.

=== 1975 ===
This year McLaren fielded two new M16E cars while Penske preferred to stick to the previous year cars. Johnny Rutherford finished second both at Indy and the championship overall.

=== 1976 ===
Johnny Rutherford won his second Indy 500 with the M16E. This was the last year of the M16 as a factory entered car, as Mclaren introduced its replacement, the M24. However, several M16s continued racing by other teams until 1981.
