= 1979 California 500 =

American auto race

(United States) 1979 California 500
Race details
- Race 11 of 14 in the 1979 SCCA/CART Indy Car Series season
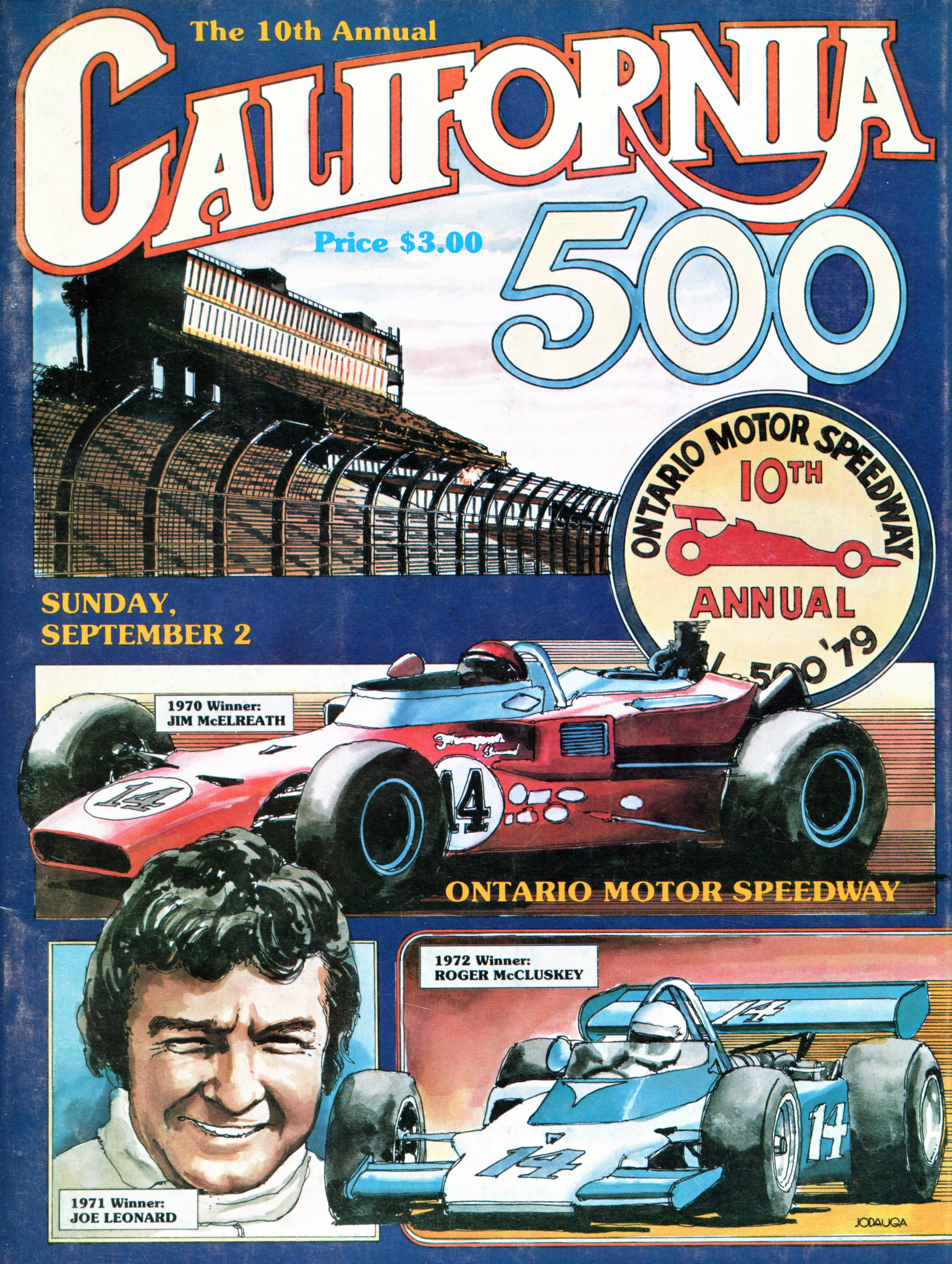
- Date: September 2, 1979
- Official name: 1979 California 500
- Location: Ontario Motor Speedway, Ontario, California, United States
- Course: Permanent racing facility 2.500 mi / 4.023 km
- Distance: 200 laps 500.000 mi / 804.672 km

Pole position
- Driver: (United States) Rick Mears (Team Penske)
- Time: 203.046 mph (326.771 km/h)

Podium
- First: (United States) Bobby Unser (Team Penske)
- Second: (United States) Rick Mears (Team Penske)
- Third: (United States) Mario Andretti (Team Penske)

The 1979 California 500, the tenth running of the event, was held at the Ontario Motor Speedway in Ontario, California, on Sunday, September 2, 1979. The event was race number 11 of 14 in the 1979 SCCA/CART Indy Car Series. The race was won by Bobby Unser, his third California 500 victory. It was the first year of the California 500 under CART sanctioning.

== Background ==
In late 1978, the CART series was formed as a collective of race teams who formed a sanctioning body to address problems they faced in auto racing, ones they felt were ignored by USAC. While some events switched allegiance to CART, the Triple Crown of 500 mile races comprising Indianapolis, Pocono, and Ontario maintained loyalty to USAC.

On March 25, USAC opened their season at Ontario with a 200-mile doubleheader of Indy cars and USAC Stock Cars. A. J. Foyt won both races. CART teams skipped the event and Foyt had no real challengers. The event attracted what was described as the smallest crowd in track history at around 20,000.

On April 19, 1979, the USAC board of directors voted unanimously to reject the entries for the 1979 Indianapolis 500 of six key teams: Penske, Patrick, McLaren, Fletcher, Chaparral, and Gurney. These six teams (19 cars) were alleged to be "harmful to racing" and "not in good standing with USAC." USAC sent the owners a telegram informing them of the situation while they were participating in the CART race at Atlanta, the Gould Twin Dixie 125s.

On April 26, the "rejected six" teams filed suit in the U.S. District Court for the Southern District of Indiana, requesting an injunction to allow the teams to compete in the 1979 Indy 500. They cited antitrust and restraint of trade. On May 5, judge James Ellsworth Noland issued the injunction, but restrained the teams from disrupting or interfering with the running of the event. Rick Mears won the Indianapolis 500 for Team Penske.

On June 1, the Indianapolis Motor Speedway declared that the 1980 Indianapolis 500 would be invitation only. In order to receive an automatic invitation, teams would have to run at Pocono on June 24 and Ontario on September 2. The move also protected the Speedway legally from disallowing entries.

CART declared they would boycott all remaining races sanctioned by USAC. They openly suggested they could run a 500 kilometer race at Trenton Speedway on the same day as Pocono and would honor Pocono tickets.

Seeing how the conflict was hurting Indy Car racing, both sides approached Ray Smartis, General Manager of Ontario, to lead peace talks in early June. As a result of the talks, CART dropped their plans to rival the Pocono 500 "in a good faith move in the best interest of auto racing." Smartis presented peace plans for a unified Indy car series to USAC who rejected the idea.

As CART teams boycotted the 1979 Pocono 500 on June 24, the track saw their regular attendance shrink by half. Eight days after the Pocono 500, Ontario Motor Speedway changed their sanctioning for September's California 500 from USAC to CART. "We feel the decision to go with CART is in the best interest of the race as well as the fans," said Ray Smartis. "I think we owe it to the fans to provide the best field of cars and drivers available and under the present circumstances. I don't think that's possible with USAC."

By 1979, Ontario owed nearly $35 million to the bond holders who owned the track ($25.5 million in principal and $9 million in delinquent interest payments). Despite this, Smartis insisted the track was in a good position. "Right now we're financially viable. We're making money and if it wasn't for the burden of the debt, we would be just as successful as any other company. But that debt burden is unbelievable. It's hard to get anywhere when you're looking at $2 million a year (in debt paybacks)."

Days before the California 500, Smartis admitted ticket sales were down 15 percent compared to 1978, the first time pre-sales did not stay consistent with past years. "The dissension between the USAC and the CART groups is the primary reason for all of this. There is a question in the fans' minds whether or not we will have enough drivers and who will and won't be here. They remember last year and all the problem, and I can't blame them for being concerned... We're in serious trouble. We are going to have to take a good look at this race and what we want to do in the future. We are in a critical position in regards to the California 500 and other events here. We have an obligation to the bond holders and because of that we are forced to make a serious study of this and other events."

== Practice and Time Trials ==
Unlike in past years, practice began on Wednesday. In the four-hour practice session on August 29, Bobby Unser posted the fastest speed at 200.566 mph. Unser's Team Penske teammate, Mario Andretti, was second fastest at 198.255 mph. A surprising third was Spike Gehlhausen at 197.455 mph.

For the first time, Indy cars used two days of Formula One-style group qualifying. Teams were split into five groups of eight cars that were given 20 minute sessions. Rick Mears was fastest at 203.046 mph. Al Unser was second at 201.844 mph. Bobby Unser was third at 201.387 mph. Five cars had their times disqualified for their rear wings being too high: Gordon Johncock, Wally Dallenbach, Tim Richmond, Vern Schuppan, and Tom Frantz.

In Friday's second day of time trials, Al Unser improved his speed to 202.202 mph but was not fast enough to knock Mears off the pole.

A 10-minute qualifying session was held on Saturday to determine the 33rd and final starting position. Joe Saldana earned the spot with a speed of 188.770 mph. The cars driven by Cliff Hucul and Larry Cannon were ultimately added to the field as "promoter's options" and the field was expanded to 35 starters.

== Race ==
An estimated 75,000 spectators were on hand for the tenth California 500. The Datsun 280ZX pace car was driven by Otis Chandler, publisher of the Los Angeles Times.

The race promised to be a battle for the win between the cars with ground-effects, the Team Penske machines driven by Rick Mears, Bobby Unser and Mario Andretti versus the Chaparral 2K of Al Unser.

When the race began, Al Unser passed Mears to take the lead. The first caution came out on lap three when Mike Mosley blew an engine, the fifth engine his car had lost in the week. On lap 8, Spike Gehlhausen and Tom Bagley touched in turn one which sent Bagley spinning into the wall. Bagley was cut out of the car and treated for a broken rib.

Al Unser's Chaparral was the fastest car in the early part of the race, leading 62 of the first 71 laps. But on lap 72, the bracket holding Unser's front wing broke and his crew lost several minutes repairing it.

Al Unser's repairs gave the lead to the Penske cars of Bobby Unser and Rick Mears, who swapped the lead several times during the middle of the race.

It looked that Mears might back up his Indianapolis win with a victory at Ontario but on a lap 164 pit stop, Mears stalled the car leaving the pits and needed to be restarted. His stop was 34 seconds long, compared to Bobby Unser's 14 second stop, which allowed Unser to take the lead.

Bobby Unser drove to a 10-second victory over Mears to capture his third California 500. Mario Andretti ran out of fuel on the last lap and coasted to the finish line. Andretti had a sick engine most of the day and was unable to challenge his Penske teammates. Penske cars finished 1-2-3, the first time in major American racing that a team swept the top three spots.

== Box score ==
| Finish | Grid | No | Name | Entrant | Chassis | Engine | Laps | Time/Status | Led | Points |
|---|---|---|---|---|---|---|---|---|---|---|
| 1 | 3 | 12 | (United States) Bobby Unser | Penske Racing | Penske PC-7 | Cosworth | 200 | 3:24:22.000 | 97 | 1000 |
| 2 | 1 | 9 | (United States) Rick Mears | Penske Racing | Penske PC-7 | Cosworth | 200 | +10.000 | 34 | 800 |
| 3 | 4 | 99 | (United States) Mario Andretti | Penske Racing | Penske PC-6 | Cosworth | 200 | +34.000 | 0 | 700 |
| 4 | 13 | 4 | (United States) Johnny Rutherford | Team McLaren | McLaren M24B | Cosworth | 199 | +1 Lap | 2 | 600 |
| 5 | 2 | 2 | (United States) Al Unser | Chaparral Racing | Chaparral 2K | Cosworth | 197 | +3 Laps | 62 | 500 |
| 6 | 8 | 25 | (United States) Danny Ongais | Interscope Racing | Parnelli VPJ6B | Cosworth | 196 | +4 Laps | 0 | 400 |
| 7 | 30 | 34 | (Australia) Vern Schuppan | Wysard Motor Co. | Wildcat Mk2 | DGS | 192 | +8 Laps | 0 | 300 |
| 8 | 29 | 94 | (United States) Don Whittington | Team McLaren | McLaren M24B | Cosworth | 190 | +10 Laps | 0 | 0 |
| 9 | 14 | 21 | (United States) Lee Kunzman | Conqueste Racing Team | Parnelli VPJ6C | Cosworth | 188 | +12 Laps | 0 | 200 |
| 10 | 25 | 72 | (United States) Jerry Sneva | Hodgson Racing | McLaren M24 | Cosworth | 170 | Engine | 0 | 150 |
| 11 | 31 | 18 | (United States) Tom Frantz | Tom Frantz | Wildcat | Offenhauser | 152 | +48 Laps | 0 | 100 |
| 12 | 24 | 98 | (United States) Bill Whittington | Whittington Racing | Parnelli VPJ6C | Cosworth | 139 | Intake manifold | 0 | 0 |
| 13 | 17 | 60 | (United States) Roger Mears | Patrick Racing | Penske PC-6 | Cosworth | 135 | Engine | 0 | 0 |
| 14 | 35 | 95 | (United States) Larry Cannon | Cannon Racing Team | Wildcat | Offenhauser | 128 | Piston | 0 | 25 |
| 15 | 12 | 20 | (United States) Gordon Johncock | Patrick Racing | Penske PC-6 | Cosworth | 119 | Fuel pump | 0 | 25 |
| 16 | 15 | 23 | (United States) Dick Ferguson | Aero Electronics | Penske | Cosworth | 118 | Valve | 0 | 25 |
| 17 | 5 | 1 | (United States) Tom Sneva | Jerry O'Connell Racing | McLaren M24 | Cosworth | 108 | Oil pump | 5 | 20 |
| 18 | 23 | 30 | (United States) John Martin | John Martin | McLaren | Offenhauser | 107 | Engine | 0 | 0 |
| 19 | 32 | 28 | (United States) Billy Scott | Billy Scott | Eagle | Offenhauser | 74 | Engine | 0 | 20 |
| 20 | 20 | 77 | (United States) Salt Walther | Dayton-Walther | Penske PC-6 | Cosworth | 69 | Transmission | 0 | 20 |
| 21 | 27 | 69 | (United States) Al Loquasto | Spike Gehlhausen | Eagle | Offenhauser | 69 | Piston | 0 | 15 |
| 22 | 22 | 41 | (United States) Bill Alsup | WASP Racing | McLaren M16D | Offenhauser | 59 | Cylinder | 0 | 15 |
| 23 | 7 | 71 | (United States) Steve Krisiloff | Longhorn Racing | Penske PC-6 | Cosworth | 47 | Valve | 0 | 15 |
| 24 | 16 | 40 | (United States) Wally Dallenbach | Patrick Racing | Penske PC-6 | Cosworth | 46 | Engine | 0 | 15 |
| 25 | 10 | 55 | (United States) Spike Gehlhausen | Fletcher Racing Team | Lightning | Cosworth | 46 | Halfshaft | 0 | 10 |
| 26 | 18 | 35 | (United States) Tim Richmond | Pat Santello | Lightning | Offenhauser | 39 | Transmission | 0 | 10 |
| 27 | 28 | 19 | (Italy) Phil Caliva | Spike Gehlhausen | Eagle 79 | Offenhauser | 23 | Oil leak | 0 | 10 |
| 28 | 19 | 10 | (United States) Pancho Carter | Alex Morales Motorsports | Lightning | Offenhauser | 21 | Camshaft | 0 | 10 |
| 29 | 26 | 15 | (United States) Bob Harkey | Alex Morales Motorsports | Lightning | Offenhauser | 17 | Crash | 0 | 0 |
| 30 | 33 | 59 | (United States) Joe Saldana | Hoffman Racing | Lightning | Offenhauser | 14 | Oil pump | 0 | 5 |
| 31 | 21 | 86 | (Australia) Dennis Firestone | Dennis Firestone | Lola | Cosworth | 10 | Oil leak | 0 | 0 |
| 32 | 9 | 11 | (United States) Tom Bagley | Longhorn Racing | Penske PC-6 | Cosworth | 7 | Crash | 0 | 5 |
| 33 | 6 | 32 | (United States) Johnny Parsons | Jerry O'Connell Racing | McLaren | Cosworth | 4 | Valve | 0 | 0 |
| 34 | 11 | 36 | (United States) Mike Mosley | All American Racers | Eagle 79 | Cosworth | 2 | Engine | 0 | 5 |
| 35 | 34 | 79 | (Canada) Cliff Hucul | Hoffman Racing | Eagle | Offenhauser | 2 | Transmission | 0 | 0 |

=== Race Statistics ===
- Average Speed: 146.794 mph (236.242 km/h)
- Lead changes: 18 among 5 drivers

Lap Leaders
| From Lap | To Lap | Total Laps | Leader |
|---|---|---|---|
| 1 | 25 | 25 | Al Unser |
| 26 | 30 | 5 | Tom Sneva |
| 31 | 47 | 17 | Al Unser |
| 48 | 51 | 4 | Bobby Unser |
| 52 | 71 | 20 | Al Unser |
| 72 | 106 | 35 | Bobby Unser |
| 107 | 115 | 9 | Rick Mears |
| 116 | 125 | 10 | Bobby Unser |
| 126 | 138 | 13 | Rick Mears |
| 139 | 139 | 1 | Johnny Rutherford |
| 140 | 150 | 11 | Bobby Unser |
| 151 | 155 | 5 | Rick Mears |
| 156 | 161 | 6 | Bobby Unser |
| 162 | 164 | 3 | Rick Mears |
| 165 | 165 | 1 | Johnny Rutherford |
| 166 | 183 | 18 | Bobby Unser |
| 184 | 187 | 4 | Rick Mears |
| 188 | 200 | 13 | Bobby Unser |

== Standings after the race ==
Drivers' Championship standings

| Pos | Driver | Points |
|---|---|---|
| 1 | (United States) Rick Mears | 3340 |
| 2 | (United States) Bobby Unser | 3070 |
| 3 | (United States) Johnny Rutherford | 1833 |
| 4 | (United States) Gordon Johncock | 1783 |
| 5 | (United States) Al Unser | 1590 |
