= 1977 Pocono 500 =

(United States) 1977 Pocono 500
Race details
- 7th round of the 1977 USAC Championship Car season
- Date: June 26, 1977
- Official name: 1977 Schaefer 500
- Location: Long Pond, Pennsylvania
- Course: Permanent racing facility 2.5 mi / 4.023 km
- Distance: 200 laps 500 mi / 804.672 km
- Weather: Temperatures up to 75 °F (24 °C); wind speeds up to 14 miles per hour (23 km/h)

Pole position
- Driver: (United States) A. J. Foyt (A. J. Foyt Racing)
- Time: 189.474 mph

Podium
- First: (United States) Tom Sneva (Team Penske)
- Second: (United States) Mario Andretti (Team Penske)
- Third: (United States) Wally Dallenbach Sr. (Patrick Racing)

The 1977 Pocono 500, the 7th running of the event, was held at the Pocono Raceway in Long Pond, Pennsylvania, on Sunday, June 26, 1977. Branded as the 1977 Schaefer 500 for sponsorship reasons, the race was Tom Sneva's first victory in a 500-mile race and the first 1-2 finish for Team Penske in Indy car racing.

== A.J. Foyt versus Citicorp ==
The Pocono 500 was the culmination of a year-long feud Foyt had with Citicorp, sponsor of the season-long USAC Championship with their First National City Travelers Checks division.

Beginning in 1976, First National City Travelers Checks, a division of Citicorp, was the title sponsor of USAC's Indy car championship. At the end of the year, the Citicorp Cup was awarded to the series champion along with a $20,000 bonus. In total, they gave roughly $300,000 in annual support for USAC.

During the race at Phoenix on March 27, 1977, Johnny Rutherford (driving a car sponsored by First National City Travelers Checks) hit Gordon Johncock, which caused Johncock to spin. In that same race, Rutherford made several aggressive blocks on A. J. Foyt, who believed Rutherford was dropping oil on track. After the race, Johncock threatened to put Rutherford "over the fence" next chance he got, and punched him in the nose. Johncock was fined $1,500. Elsewhere, Foyt grabbed Rutherford's crew chief, Tyler Alexander, by the shirt, contending that Alexander was giving Rutherford radio orders where to block Foyt.

These actions angered First National City Travelers Checks (Citicorp), who implied they would withdraw their title sponsorship if similar actions continued. Citicorp chairman Fred Stecher said, "If not for assurances from Dick King (USAC President and competition director), I would be gravely concerned about the future of the relationship. They can't be in this business and talk like that. They should walk it off, talk it off, and cool it off. Punching people out, or picking them up by the throat right off the ground is shortsighted to the point of being microscopic."

Angered by Stecher's comments, Foyt refused to run First National City Travelers Checks decals on his car or a patch on his uniform.

After winning his record fourth Indianapolis 500 in May, Foyt was informed he was not eligible for the Citicorp bonus money, despite leading the points standings, because of his refusal to sport their decals. Two weeks after Indianapolis, Foyt skipped the race at the Milwaukee Mile. For Pocono, Foyt entered a car, but did not list himself as a driver, and hinted he might skip the Pocono 500. It was speculated he did not want the track promoting the race without offering him appearance money.

"I asked for expense money, not appearance money. But they wouldn't even pay for my airplane ticket here. They made me a chicken-bleep offer that wasn't even close."

== Practice ==
For the first time, activity for the Pocono 500 was shortened to less than a week, and qualifying was not held on the weekend before the race.

Practice began on Tuesday morning, June 21. Johnny Rutherford posted the fastest speed at 188.482 mph. Rutherford suffered a scratch to his eye after picking up sand on track. Days after losing the Swedish Grand Prix while leading with two laps remaining, Mario Andretti posted the second fastest speed at 185.147 mph. Joe Saldana brushed the turn one wall and broke a wheel but returned to the track after replacing the wheel.

Foyt did not arrive at Pocono until Wednesday morning and drove 35 practice laps, reaching a speed of 185.033 mph. Gordon Johncock led Wednesday's practice at 188.719 mph. Spike Gehlhausen's car suffered moderate damage in the day's only crash.

In the morning practice session on Thursday, Janet Guthrie spun but avoided contact with the wall.

== Time Trials ==
In Thursday's qualifying session, Foyt won the pole with a two-lap average speed of 189.474 mph. Johnny Rutherford and Mario Andretti joined him on the front row. Foyt told reporters, "I came here to test a new nose on the car, and the driver I wanted to use didn't show up so I qualified the car. Now, since I qualified, I assume I'm going to run the race."

Some of the 10,000 spectators on hand for qualifying booed Foyt as he posted the fastest speed. "Those people who boo don't know what they're talking about. (Expletive) those guys who do." "I've been booed before, I can take it. The reason I went back to the garage was that I didn't want to stay out there and be hassled. I knew if I stayed out, I'd get mad."

As he walked to the garage, Foyt made a gesture to the crowd, saying, "I motioned for some big, fat, sloppy guy up in the stands who was really on me to come down and say those things to my face." Foyt added that a crew member chased a fan who called his team "a bunch of Texas bums." After signing autographs for a large group of children, Foyt returned to the garage area and refused to be photographed for the traditional front row photograph with the other front row starters.

Citicorp chairman Fred Stecher said that Foyt behaved in a manner "detrimental to the sport of auto racing" and because of it, Citicorp would withdraw their sponsorship from USAC following the 1977 season. "I can't allow my organization to be associated with anything that condones that sort of behavior. All of USAC's rules apply to everyone except Mr. Foyt. If they choose to run their business that way, fine. But we don't have to be a party to it. Foyt's actions Thursday, and USAC's inability to or unwillingness to take disciplinary action, was the last straw." The dispute was later resolved and Citicorp continued their sponsorship in 1978. Surprisingly, Citicorp even reached a sponsorship deal with Foyt to sponsor his car in 1978.

During the final practice on Friday, Mario Andretti's car jumped out of gear and over-revved the engine, bending some valves. After changing five engines in practice already, Team Penske was out of spare engines and had to rebuild this one by swapping in the cylinder heads from another.

== Race ==
During pre-race driver introduction, polesitter A.J. Foyt was booed loudly by the crowd. Indianapolis Motor Speedway track owner, Tony Hulman, delivered the command to start engines. At Indianapolis one month earlier, the presence of Janet Guthrie as the only female driver caused debate over whether or not the traditional command of "gentlemen start your engines" would be given. As the cars are not started by the drivers, rather by mechanics with an electric hand-held starter at the rear, Hulman stated there was no need to change to command to include the presence of Guthrie. In response, Guthrie's team assigned Kay Bignotti (wife of George Bignotti) as the crew member to operate the inertial starter at the back of her car. At the Indianapolis 500, Hulman responded by saying "In company with the first lady ever to qualify at Indianapolis, gentlemen, start your engines!"

At Pocono, Guthrie's crew did not have a female crew member and Hulman returned to the traditional command of "Gentlemen, start your engines!" It was the final time Tony Hulman gave the command to start engines at a 500-mile Indy car race before his death on October 27, 1977.

A.J. Foyt led the first 10 laps, which were run mostly under caution. The first yellow flag came out on lap two when Bobby Olivero lost oil pressure and had to be towed back to the pit. The caution came out again on lap seven when Rick Mears blew an engine. Gordon Johncock took the lead on lap 14 and led for 56 laps over the afternoon. Foyt returned to the lead on lap 51. Johnny Rutherford and Wally Dallenbach swapped the lead as the race neared the mid-point. Tom Sneva led for the first time on lap 103 during pit stops.

Foyt fell out of the race on lap 119 with a burned piston. A roar of cheers from the crowd was heard when Foyt's car was pushed away.

Mario Andretti took the lead for the first time on lap 129, and appeared to have the race in control, leading for a total of 30 laps.

On lap 162, Andretti gave up the lead to make an unscheduled pit stop for a cut tire. Entering the pits too fast with failing brakes, Andretti slid far past his pit stall and had to go around another lap before changing tires. This handed control of the race to Andretti's teammate at Team Penske, Tom Sneva.

On lap 187, Mike Mosley crashed hard in turn two. He was hospitalized with a concussion and whiplash that kept him from racing until September.

Sneva had a one lap advantage over the field. On the restart with 8 laps to go, Andretti passed Sneva to unlap himself. Seconds later, the caution came back out for debris leftover from Mosley's crash in turn two which allowed Andretti to come back around to the end of the lead lap. The race went back to green with five laps remaining, but was not enough time for Andretti to retake the lead.

Sneva beat Andretti to the finish by 1.85 seconds. Sneva's average speed was 152.931 mph and earned $86,526. For the first time, Team Penske finished first and second in an Indy car race. Sneva would go on to win his first Indy car championship in 1977.

== Box score ==
Finish	Grid	No	Name	Entrant	Chassis	Engine	Laps	Time/Status	Led	Points
1	4	8	(United States) Tom Sneva	Penske Racing	McLaren M24	Cosworth DFX	200	3:17:11.900	45	1000
2	3	9	(United States) Mario Andretti	Penske Racing	McLaren M24	Cosworth DFX	200	+1.850	30	800
3	5	20	(United States) Gordon Johncock	Patrick Racing	Wildcat Mk 2	DGS	199	Flagged	56	700
4	13	40	(United States) Wally Dallenbach	Patrick Racing	Wildcat Mk 2	DGS	199	Flagged	25	600
5	2	2	(United States) Johnny Rutherford	McLaren Racing	McLaren M24	Cosworth DFX	193	Flagged	15	500
6	20	65	(United States) Lee Kunzman	Patrick Santello	Eagle 74	Offenhauser	190	Flagged	0	400
7	21	98	(United States) Gary Bettenhausen	Agajanian/King	Dragon 76	Offenhauser	188	Flagged	0	300
8	8	5	(United States) Mike Mosley	Jerry O'Connell Racing	Lightning 77	Offenhauser	183	Crash	4	250
9	31	97	(United States) Bill Vukovich II	Agajanian/King	Dragon 76	Offenhauser	160	Ignition	0	200
10	26	23	(United States) Joe Saldana	Leader Card Racing	Eagle 74	Offenhauser	159	Valve	0	150
11	19	92	(United States) Johnny Parsons	Vatis Enterprises	Eagle 72	Offenhauser	149	Piston	0	100
12	15	77	(United States) Salt Walther	Dayton-Walther	McLaren M16C/D	DGS	149	Ring/Pinion	0	50
13	29	69	(United States) Jerry Grant	Hoffman Racing	Eagle 72	Offenhauser	145	Flagged	0	0
14	33	42	(United States) John Mahler	Mergard Racing	Eagle 72	Offenhauser	130	Stalled	0	0
15	1	14	(United States) A. J. Foyt	A. J. Foyt Enterprises	Coyote 74	Foyt	118	Piston	25	0
16	17	17	(United States) Dick Simon	Vollstedt Enterprises	Vollstedt 77	Offenhauser	95	Transmission	0	0
17	22	27	(United States) Janet Guthrie	Vollstedt Enterprises	Lightning 76	Offenhauser	77	Engine	0	0
18	23	36	(United States) Jerry Sneva	James C. Bidwell	McLaren M16A	Offenhauser	64	Shifter	0	0
19	9	6	(United States) Bobby Unser	Fletcher Racing	Lightning 77	Offenhauser	54	Engine	0	0
20	11	48	(United States) Pancho Carter	All American Racers	Eagle 77	Offenhauser	54	Engine	0	0
21	25	15	(Australia) Vern Schuppan	Alex Morales Motorsports	Lightning 77	Offenhauser	44	Crash	0	0
22	28	90	(United States) Steve Krisiloff	Art Sugai	Eagle 72	Offenhauser	32	Piston	0	0
23	6	25	(United States) Danny Ongais	Interscope Racing	Parnelli VPJ6-B	Cosworth DFX	30	Piston	0	0
24	32	73	(United States) Jim McElreath	Fred Carrillo	Eage 74/76	AMC	27	Rocker arm	0	0
25	7	21	(United States) Al Unser	Vel's Parnelli Jones Racing	Parnelli VPJ6-B	Cosworth DFX	25	Clutch	0	0
26	10	11	(United States) Roger McCluskey	Lindsey Hopkins Jr.	Lightning 77	Offenhauser	16	Engine	0	0
27	30	52	(United States) Chuck Gurney	Crower Engineering	Eagle 72	Crower	15	Spun out	0	0
28	14	86	(United States) Al Loquasto	Al Loquasto	McLaren M16C	Offenhauser	14	Piston	0	0
29	18	24	(United States) Tom Bigelow	Leader Card Racing	Watson 77	Offenhauser	13	Oil leak	0	0
30	16	38	(United States) Rick Mears	Theodore Racing	McLaren M16C	Offenhauser	7	Valve	0	0
31	24	26	(United States) James McElreath	Jim McElreath	Eagle 74	Offenhauser	3	Piston	0	0
32	27	78	(United States) Bobby Olivero	Alex Morales Motorsports	Lightning 77	Offenhauser	2	Oil pressure	0	0
33	12	18	(United States) George Snider	Longhorn Racing	Wildcat Mk 1	DGS	1	Valve	0	0

=== Failed to qualify ===
- No. 19 Spike Gehlhausen
- No. 22 Todd Gibson
- No. 85 Larry McCoy

== Broadcasting ==
For the second straight year, the Pocono 500 was broadcast by CBS Sports Spectacular, on July 2. Ken Squier, David Hobbs, and Brock Yates made up the commentary team. Also featured were highlights of NHRA's Spring Nationals drag racing from Columbus, Ohio.
