= 1978 California 500 =

American auto race

(United States) 1978 California 500
Race details
- Race 13 of 18 in the 1978 USAC Championship Car season
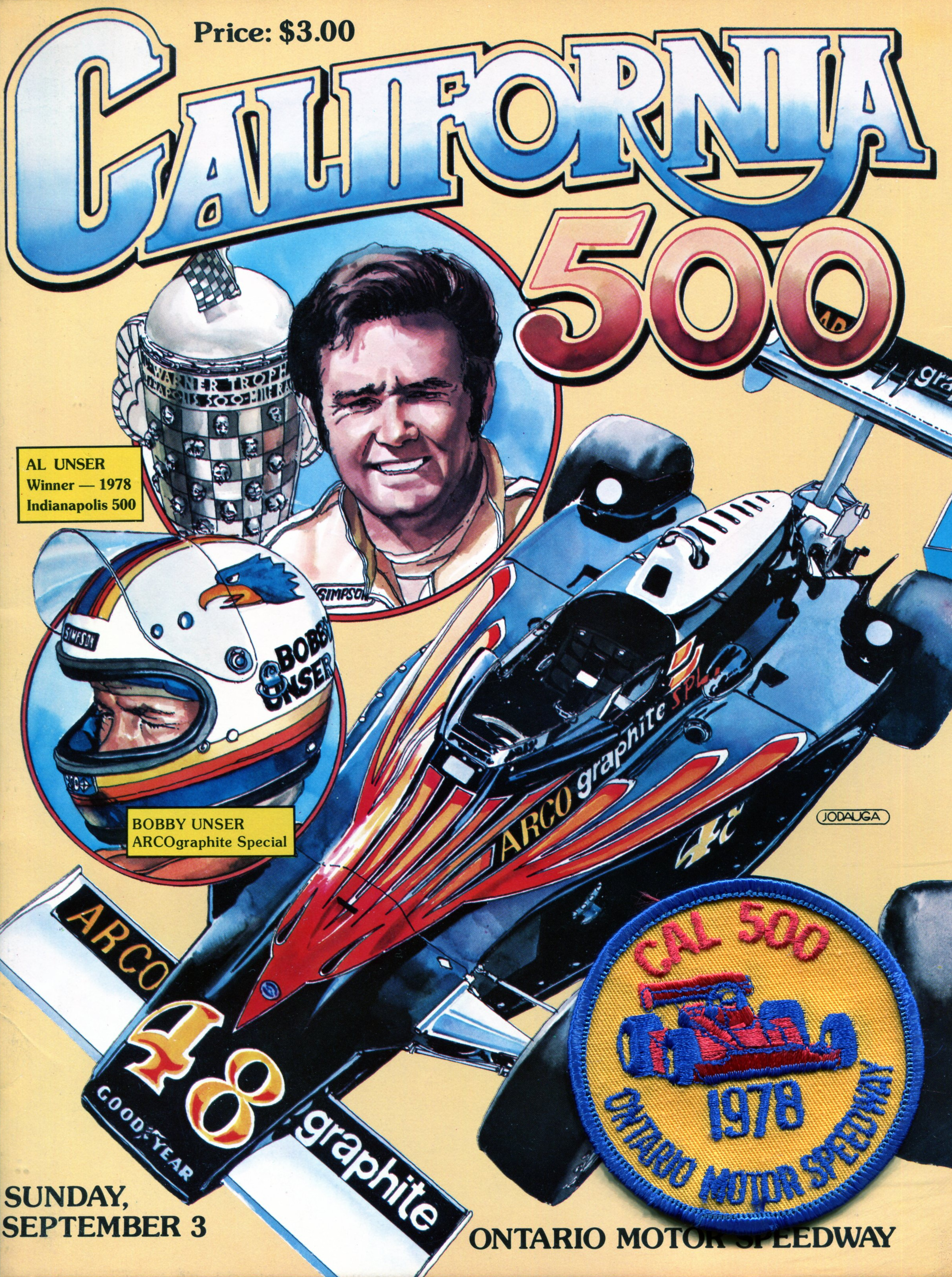
- Date: September 3, 1978
- Official name: 1978 California 500
- Location: Ontario Motor Speedway, Ontario, California, United States
- Course: Permanent racing facility 2.500 mi / 4.023 km
- Distance: 200 laps 500.000 mi / 804.672 km

Pole position
- Driver: (United States) Tom Sneva (Team Penske)
- Time: 199.933 mph (321.761 km/h)

Podium
- First: (United States) Al Unser (Jim Hall/Chaparral)
- Second: (United States) Pancho Carter (Fletcher Racing Team)
- Third: (United States) Gordon Johncock (Patrick Racing)

The 1978 California 500, the ninth running of the event, was held at the Ontario Motor Speedway in Ontario, California, on Sunday, September 3, 1978. The event was race number 13 of 18 in the 1978 USAC Championship Car season. The race was won by Al Unser, who became the only driver with win all three races in IndyCar's Triple Crown in one year.

== Background ==
USAC held the second race of the 1978 season at Ontario with a 200-mile race on March 26. Danny Ongais won the race over Tom Sneva. That same day, A. J. Foyt won the USAC Stock Car race also at Ontario.

Al Unser won the 1978 Indianapolis 500 and 1978 Pocono 500, giving him the opportunity to win all three races in IndyCar's Triple Crown in one calendar year. Unser had also won the 1977 California 500 the past year.

Mario Andretti withdrew from the California 500 in order to chase the 1978 Formula One championship. While Andretti originally intended to drive for Team Penske, his place at the team was taken by Rick Mears, who had won at Atlanta in late-July.

== Practice and Time Trials ==
Practice began on Tuesday, August 29. Tom Sneva was fastest at 196.057 mph.

Wednesday's practice saw A.J. Foyt surprisingly take practice laps in a car owned by Parnelli Jones. 1966 was the last year Foyt drove a car that he didn't build. It was the same chassis Al Unser used to win the 1977 California 500. Foyt said Jones' car was 250 pounds lighter than his own chassis, that he entered for George Snider.

=== Pole Day - Thursday August 31 ===
Qualifying was a two-lap, five-mile average speed. Tom Sneva's first lap was 200.401 mph, with a two-lap average of 199.933 mph to win the pole. Johnny Rutherford was second at 199.734 mph. Danny Ongais completed the front-row at 198.697 mph.

23 cars qualified on day one, excluding A.J. Foyt who failed to make a qualifying run because of an oil leak.

=== Time Trials Day Two - Friday September 1 ===
A.J. Foyt posted the fastest speed of all cars in the California 500 on day two. With a two-lap average of 201.365 mph, Foyt started 24th for the race. Driving Foyt's original car, George Snider qualified 25th at 186.490 mph. Only 30 cars qualified for the race. Jim McElreath was added to the field as a 31st position. It was the first time since the 1947 Indianapolis 500 that less than 33 cars were in a 500-mile Indycar race.

== Formula Super Vee Support Races ==
A pair of 25-lap support races were held on Saturday for the USAC Formula Super Vee championship, known as the Mini-Indy Series.

=== Race 1 ===
With a speed of 150.502 mph, Dennis Firestone won the pole for race one. On lap 11, Firestone spun out while leading to avoid a crashing car in front of him. That gave the lead to Bill Alsup, who led the rest of the way and won.

The race ended under caution after a spectacular crash with three laps remaining. Going down the backstretch, Roger Mears moved inside George Dyer for fifth place. The two cars moved inside of a lapped car and entered the turn three-wide. The lapped car squeezed Dyer down the track and his left-front wheel clipped Mears' right-rear wheel. Mears flipped over and tumbled towards the wall, hitting the concrete and catching on fire. He quickly ran from the car and was uninjured.

In race two, Firestone beat Alsup in a close finish by only three one hundredths of a second.

== Race ==
A crowd of 80,000 spectators attended the race. Newspapers at the time said it was the best crowd since the 1970 California 500 and gave encouragement that the event was growing after years of financial struggles. General Manager Ray Smartis said, "the event has stabilized as a Labor Day weekend fixture, and we feel it will continue to experience growth each year."

31 cars were lined up on pit road before the start of the race but only 30 had engines. 19th place starter, Jerry Karl had his engine repossessed by a creditor after qualifying. He and his team pushed the car back to the garage and he finished last. Bob Harkey's car failed to start and he was pushed back to the garage.

The much-anticipated pairing of A.J. Foyt and Parnelli Jones lasted less than a lap. As soon as the green flag waved, A.J. Foyt's transmission broke. As the field entered turn one, Salt Walther and Phil Threshie collided in turn one and crashed into the wall. Walther suffered a cracked vertebra in his neck. George Snider, Bill Vukovich II, and Roger McCluskey parked their cars before the first pit stops. None of them had refueling tanks in their pits.

On the restart for the first caution, Danny Ongais passed Tom Sneva for the lead. Johnny Rutherford took the lead on lap 15 and asserted himself as the fastest car. Rutherford led 96 of the next 104 laps. On lap 18, polesitter Tom Sneva suffered a suspension failure and hit the turn one wall.

Mike Mosley crashed in turn four on lap 78. Al Unser hit debris from the wreck and broke his front wing. His crew replaced the car's nose and he returned to the race. On lap 89, Pancho Carter's bodywork broke coming out of turn four. The car spun several times but didn't hit anything. The crew replaced the broken bodywork pieces and he returned to the race.

On lap 128, Bob Harkey's team finally got his engine running and he emerged from the garage to start his first lap of the race. Harkey eventually finished 18th, having completed 60 laps. Despite leading the most laps, Johnny Rutherford fell out of the race after 129 laps due to engine failure. Upon Rutherford's retirement, Al Unser inherited the lead as he chased the Triple Crown.

With 52 laps remaining, Wally Dallenbach blew an engine and retired. Two laps later, the second-place car of Rick Mears also fell out with engine failure.

Gordon Johncock took the lead from Unser with 22 laps remaining. The two leaders made their final refueling stop under green with less than 20 laps to go. Needing to get Johncock out of the pits ahead of Unser, Johncock's crew failed to fill the car with enough fuel. With seven laps remaining, Johncock held a seven car-length lead over Unser. Suddenly, coming out of turn three, Johncock ran out of fuel and pulled to the side of the track.

Unser took the lead after Johncock's retirement and drove to victory. Unser won all 500-mile races in 1978 and was his fourth consecutive 500-mile win including the 1977 California 500. Pancho Carter was second, five laps behind Unser. Despite retiring from the race with six to go, Johncock finished third. Tom Bagley and Lee Kunzman completed the top-five. Overcoming his flip in the Mini-Indy race the day before, Roger Mears finished sixth, 42 laps down. Only five cars were running at the end of the race.

== Box score ==
Finish	Grid	No	Name	Entrant	Chassis	Engine	Laps	Time/Status	Led	Points
1	7	2	(United States) Al Unser	Chaparral Racing	Lola T500	Cosworth DFX	200	3:26:40.270	74	1000
2	6	8	(United States) Pancho Carter	Fletcher Racing Team	Lightning	Cosworth DFX	195	Flagged	0	800
3	9	20	(United States) Gordon Johncock	Patrick Racing	Wildcat Mk2	DGS	194	Fuel pickup	16	700
4	13	22	(United States) Tom Bagley	Leader Card Racers	Watson	Offenhauser	194	Flagged	0	600
5	27	90	(United States) Lee Kunzman	Art Sugai	Sugai Fox	Offenhauser	180	Flagged	0	500
6	29	28	(United States) Roger Mears	Galles Chevrolet	Eagle	Offenhauser	158	Flagged	0	400
7	14	40	(United States) Steve Krisiloff	Patrick Racing	Wildcat Mk2	DGS	153	Crash	0	300
8	18	18	(Canada) Cliff Hucul	Longhorn Racing	Wildcat Mk1	DGS	151	Crash	0	250
9	4	7	(United States) Rick Mears	Penske Racing	Penske PC-6	Cosworth DFX	150	Engine	0	200
10	8	6	(United States) Wally Dallenbach	Jerry O'Connell Racing	McLaren M24	Cosworth DFX	148	Engine	0	150
11	2	4	(United States) Johnny Rutherford	Team McLaren	McLaren M24B	Cosworth DFX	129	Engine	96	100
12	3	25	(United States) Danny Ongais	Interscope Racing	Parenlli VPJ6B	Cosworth DFX	126	Fuel pump	7	50
13	11	48	(United States) Bobby Unser	All American Racers	Eagle	Cosworth DFX	123	Exhaust header	0	25
14	16	17	(United States) Dick Simon	Vollstedt Enterprises	Vollstedt	Offenhauser	108	Overheating	0	25
15	10	16	(United States) Johnny Parsons	Lindsey Hopkins Racing	Lightning	Offenhauser	95	Overheating	0	25
16	15	78	(United States) Mike Mosley	Alex Morales Motorsports	Lightning	Offenhauser	78	Crash	0	25
17	20	24	(United States) Sheldon Kinser	Leader Card Racers	Watson	Offenhauser	72	Oil pressure	0	20
18	22	99	(United States) Bob Harkey	Joe Hunt	Eagle	Offenhauser	60	Engine	0	20
19	30	87	(United States) Al Loquasto	Fiore Racing	Rascar	Offenhauser	40	Piston	0	20
20	31	26	(United States) Jim McElreath	McElreath Racing	Eagle 74	Offenhauser	37	Piston	0	20
21	5	19	(United States) Spike Gehlhausen	Carl Gehlhausen	Eagle 74	Offenhauser	26	Engine block	0	15
22	23	85	(United States) Larry Cannon	Fiore Racing	Wildcat Mk1	DGS	22	Oil leak	0	15
23	1	1	(United States) Tom Sneva	Penske Racing	Penske PC-6	Cosworth DFX	18	Crash	7	15
24	28	60	(United States) Roger McCluskey	Patrick Racing	Wildcat Mk2	Offenhauser	12	Overheating	0	15
25	21	30	(United States) Jerry Sneva	Thunder Racing	McLaren M16B	Offenhauser	10	Manifold	0	10
26	26	32	(United States) Bill Vukovich II	Jerry O'Connell Racing	Lightning	Cosworth DFX	9	Clutch	0	10
27	25	14	(United States) George Snider	A. J. Foyt Enterprises	Coyote	Foyt	4	Clutch	0	10
28	24	21	(United States) A. J. Foyt	Vel's Parnelli Jones Racing	Parnelli VPJ6B	Cosworth DFX	1	Gearbox	0	10
29	12	77	(United States) Salt Walther	Dayton-Walther	McLaren M24	Cosworth DFX	0	Crash	0	5
30	17	47	(United States) Phil Threshie	Fiore Racing	Lightning	Offenhauser	0	Crash	0	5
31	19	38	(United States) Jerry Karl	Bentzel Construction	McLaren M16	Offenhauser	0	Did not start	0	5
