= 1979 Pocono 500 =

(United States) 1979 Pocono 500
Race details
- 5th round of the 1979 USAC Championship Car season
- Date: June 24, 1979
- Official name: 1979 Music 500 Presented by Sam Goody
- Location: Long Pond, Pennsylvania
- Course: Permanent racing facility 2.5 mi / 4.023 km
- Distance: 200 laps 500 mi / 804.672 km
- Weather: Temperatures up to 60 °F (16 °C); wind speeds up to 14 miles per hour (23 km/h)

Pole position
- Driver: (United States) A. J. Foyt (A. J. Foyt Racing)
- Time: 182.334 mph

Podium
- First: (United States) A.J. Foyt (A.J. Foyt Racing)
- Second: (United States) Jim McElreath (Shirley McElreath)
- Third: (United States) Larry Dickson (Russ Polak)

The 1979 Pocono 500, the 9th running of the event, was held at the Pocono Raceway in Long Pond, Pennsylvania, on Sunday June 24, 1979. A. J. Foyt won the race, his third Pocono 500 win. Branded as the 1979 Music 500 Presented by Sam Goody for sponsorship reasons, the race was notable for its role in the confrontation between separate Indy car racing sanctioning bodies, USAC and CART.

== Background ==
After eight years with Schaefer as presenting sponsor of The Pocono 500, title sponsorship for the race was picked up by Pickwick International who named it the Music 500 presented by Musicland and Sam Goody.

During race weekend, in the infield on Friday were concerts by Ronnie Milsap, Henry Paul Band, and Funky Communication Committee. There was also a demonstration by the Budweiser Hot Air Balloon. On Saturday, concerts included Sister Sledge, Nantucket and Wet Willie. Saturday also was the Pocono 500 drivers meeting, hot air balloon demonstrations, and a custom van competition.

== Controversy ==
The race was sanctioned by USAC, and was part of the 1979 USAC National Championship. Many of the top teams in open-wheel racing were part of the inaugural 1979 SCCA/CART Indy Car Series. The Pocono 500 was a major aspect of the first open-wheel "split".

In late 1978, the CART series was formed as a collective of race teams who formed a sanctioning body to address problems they faced in auto racing, ones they felt were ignored by USAC. While some events switched allegiance to CART, the Triple Crown of 500 mile races comprising Indianapolis, Pocono, and Ontario maintained loyalty to USAC.

On April 19, the USAC board of directors voted unanimously to reject the entries for the 1979 Indianapolis 500 of six key teams: Penske, Patrick, McLaren, Fletcher, Chaparral, and Gurney. These six teams (19 cars) were alleged to be "harmful to racing" and "not in good standing with USAC." USAC sent the owners a telegram informing them of the situation while they were participating in the CART race at Atlanta, the Gould Twin Dixie 125s.

On April 26, the "rejected six" teams filed suit in the U.S. District Court for the Southern District of Indiana, requesting an injunction to allow the teams to compete in the 1979 Indy 500. They cited antitrust and restraint of trade. On May 5, judge James Ellsworth Noland issued the injunction, but restrained the teams from disrupting or interfering with the running of the event. Rick Mears won the Indianapolis 500 for Team Penske.

On June 1, the Indianapolis Motor Speedway declared that the 1980 Indianapolis 500 would be invitation only. In order to receive an automatic invitation, teams would have to run at Pocono on June 24 and Ontario on September 2. The move also protected the Speedway legally from disallowing entries.

CART declared they would boycott all remaining races sanctioned by USAC. They openly suggested they could run a 500 kilometer race at Trenton Speedway on the same day as Pocono and would honor Pocono tickets. On June 11, CART dropped those plans "in a good faith move in the best interest of auto racing."

Only one CART driver, Danny Ongais, ignored the boycott and entered the Pocono 500. Ongais's sponsor, Panasonic, insisted that he enter the Pocono 500 saying they needed the New York area exposure and that they needed to be part of Pocono's week of music concerts leading up to the 500.

Pocono had a small entry list with nowhere near the number of cars to fill the 33-car starting grid. Knowing that the last place finisher was guaranteed at least $3,500, many teams rushed to find old Indy cars to enter in the race. Roger Rager entered a 1968 Eagle. Frank Weiss entered a 1970 Manta. Al Loquasto drove a 1971 McLaren. This led some to joke that the Indianapolis Motor Speedway Museum would be closed while their classic inventory was raced at Pocono.

== Practice ==
Practice began on Tuesday with Danny Ongais fastest at 178.006 mph.

In Thursday practice, Jerry Sneva suffered an engine failure and spun wildly down the frontstretch. His car was withdrawn from the race.

== Time Trials ==
On Thursday, qualifying was set by a two-lap average time trial. Danny Ongais set the pace early with an average 182.315 mph. Later, A. J. Foyt surpassed Ongais to take the pole with a speed of 182.334 mph. Johnny Parsons was the third fastest at 179.104 mph. Janet Guthrie qualified fourth at 179.051 mph, the best starting spot of her career.

23 cars qualified for the race on day 1. Jerry Karl was the slowest with a speed of 128.251 mph, 54 mph slower than A.J. Foyt's pole speed.

Only two cars made qualifying attempts on Friday. After Jerry Karl's crew discovered a mechanical problem, he requalified at 172.463 mph and retained his 23rd starting spot. Jerry Sneva was hired to drive Wayne Woodward's car and qualified 169.030 mph. As a day two qualifier, he started 24th. Eldon Rasmussen's car did not arrive in time to qualify, but with a short field, he was allowed to start the race without posting a qualifying speed.

== Race ==
With 25 cars starting the race, it was the smallest field for a 500-mile Indy car race since 22 cars started the 1925 Indianapolis 500.

On the pace laps before the start of the race, dozens of spectators ran to the edge of the track in turn one. The cars were brought back onto pit road and the green flag was delayed by 30 minutes while the spectators were returned to the infield. George Snider's car suffered a cracked engine block after the pace laps and was unable to restart the race.

Starting from the middle of the front row, Danny Ongais took the lead at the start and led the first 12 laps. Johnny Parsons took the lead on lap 13 and held it for five laps before Ongais repassed him. The first caution came out on lap 19 when the AMC engine of Bob Harkey expired.

Johnny Parsons fell out with a burned piston after 35 laps. Roger McCluskey led multiple laps in an Indy car race for the first time since his 1973 championship season when he led six laps.

Eldon Rasmussen crashed badly on lap 75 when his rear wing fell off at the end of the frontstretch and he hit the turn one wall nearly head-on. Rasmussen was knocked unconscious and suffered a concussion, broken right leg, and broken ribs. Rasmussen was hospitalized for three weeks and never again competed in an Indy car race.

The race evolved into a three-car battle between Foyt, Ongais, and Larry Dickson. Dickson was driving the same chassis that Tom Sneva was driving when he won the 1977 Pocono 500. Dickson repeated his strong run from 1978 and led 19 laps around halfway.

Roger McCluskey fell out of the race in an unusual manner on lap 102. The rear bulkhead on his car separated, which caused the left sidepod to rub the left-rear tire. The tire eventually blew which caused a spin in turn three.

AJ Foyt retook the lead on lap 114, followed by Danny Ongais. Foyt led for the next 23 laps before a pit decision cost him the lead. Under green flag pit stops, Foyt's crew added fuel only, while Ongais's team also changed tires. Ongais was able to pass Foyt and extend his lead to 18 seconds. While leading on lap 148, Ongais suffered an engine failure and finished 12th.

Upon Ongais's retirement, Foyt inherited a six-second lead over Larry Dickson. On lap 161, Dickson ran out of fuel and it took the crew 42 seconds to restart him. That gave Foyt a one lap lead over second.

The caution flag came out on lap 167 when two spectators ran across the track in turn one.

While running third with 15 laps remaining, Gary Bettenhausen blew an engine in turn three and spun in the oil to bring out the seventh caution of the day.

With three laps remaining, second place runner Larry Dickson entered the pits with a fuel pickup problem. Jim McElreath passed Dickson for second. Foyt led the final 53 laps and beat McElreath by two laps. It was Foyt's third Pocono 500 win and he earned $78,562.

With crowd estimates in 1978 around 110,000, a lack of CART drivers and poor weather kept spectators away in 1979. Due to the 1979 oil crisis, gas shortages in the Pennsylvania area also kept spectators from driving to the track. Estimates ranged from 35,000 to 50,000 spectators on hand.

== Box score ==
Finish	Grid	No	Name	Entrant	Chassis	Engine	Laps	Time/Status	Led	Points
1	1	14	(United States) A. J. Foyt	A. J. Foyt Enterprises	Parnelli VPJ6C	Cosworth DFX	200	3:42:13.780	128	1000
2	13	26	(United States) Jim McElreath	McElreath Racing	Eagle	Offenhauser	198	Flagged	0	800
3	6	80	(United States) Larry Dickson	RP Racing	Penske PC-6	Cosworth DFX	197	Out of fuel	19	700
4	24	81	(United States) Jerry Sneva	Shade Tree Racing	Eagle	Offenhauser	192	Flagged	0	600
5	14	17	(United States) Dick Simon	Vollstedt Enterprises	Vollstedt	Offenhauser	191	Flagged	0	500
6	19	22	(United States) Bill Vukovich II	Leader Card Racers	Watson	Offenhauser	190	Flagged	0	400
7	7	46	(United States) Howdy Holmes	Armstrong Mould Racing Team	Wildcat Mk2	DGS	190	Flagged	1	300
8	5	43	(United States) Tom Bigelow	Armstrong Mould Racing Team	Lola T500B	Cosworth DFX	184	Radiator	1	250
9	12	98	(United States) Gary Bettenhausen	J. C. Agajanian	King	Offenhauser	181	Engine	0	200
10	20	86	(United States) Al Loquasto	Robert LaWarre	McLaren M16C	Offenhauser	160	Flagged	0	150
11	11	29	(Canada) Cliff Hucul	Hucul Racing	McLaren M16C	Offenhauser	158	Piston	0	100
12	2	25	(United States) Danny Ongais	Interscope Racing	Parnelli VPJ6B	Cosworth DFX	148	Engine	40	0
13	22	60	(United States) Tony Bettenhausen Jr.	Robert LaWarre	Eagle	Chevrolet	120	Transaxle	0	25
14	10	44	(United States) Roger McCluskey	Armstrong Mould Racing Team	Lola T500B	Cosworth DFX	102	Rear bulkhead	6	25
15	9	24	(United States) Sheldon Kinser	Leader Card Racers	Watson	Offenhauser	100	Engine	0	25
16	15	97	(United States) Phil Threshie	Grant King Racers	King	Chevrolet	85	Engine	0	25
17	23	38	(United States) Jerry Karl	William Compton	McLaren M16C	Offenhauser	84	Spun out	0	20
18	8	20	(United States) John Martin	Scientific Drilling Controls Racing	McLaren	Offenhauser	67	Piston	0	20
19	4	45	(United States) Janet Guthrie	Armstrong Mould Racing Team	Lola T500B	Cosworth DFX	67	Clutch	0	20
20	25	58	(Canada) Eldon Rasmussen	Rasmussen Racing	Rascar	Chevrolet	58	Crash	0	20
21	3	15	(United States) Johnny Parsons	Lindsey Hopkins Racing	Lightning	Offenhauser	35	Piston	5	15
22	16	30	(United States) Dana Carter	Thunder Racing	McLaren M16C	Offenhauser	27	Engine block	0	15
23	18	50	(Canada) Frank Weiss	Intercomp Racing	Manta	Offenhauser	18	Header	0	15
24	21	27	(United States) Bob Harkey	Vollstedt Enterprises	Vollstedt	AMC	16	Engine	0	15
25	17	51	(United States) George Snider	Lindesy Hopkins Racing	Lightning	Offenhauser	0	Engine block	0	10

== Aftermath ==
Danny Ongais was fined $5,000 by CART for disobeying the CART boycott.

Eight days after the Pocono 500, Ontario Motor Speedway changed their sanctioning for September's California 500 from USAC to CART.

On August 30, Pocono Raceway filed an antitrust lawsuit against CART seeking $6.3 million in damages. The resulting boycott caused the normal crowd of near 125,000 spectators to be cut in half and caused the track to lose $2 million. With antitrust lawsuits, damages are tripled to arrive at the $6.3 million figure. In addition to CART, other defendants in the suit were Team Penske, Roger Penske, Patrick Racing, U.E. "Pat" Patrick, and Gould Inc. After a similar boycott in 1981, the lawsuit was increased to $9 million. The suit was settled in early 1982.
