= 1977 USAC Championship Car season =

Sports season

- USAC National Championship Trail

Season
- Races: 14
- Start date: March 6
- End date: October 29

Awards
- National champion: (United States) Tom Sneva
- Indianapolis 500 winner: (United States) A. J. Foyt

The 1977 USAC Championship Car season consisted of 14 races, beginning in Ontario, California on March 6 and concluding in Avondale, Arizona on October 29. The USAC National Champion was Tom Sneva and the Indianapolis 500 winner was A. J. Foyt. The schedule included a road course for the first time since 1970.

== Entrants ==
(partial list)

Team	Chassis	Engine	Drivers	Rounds
(United States) A.J. Foyt Enterprises	Coyote	Foyt	(United States) A.J. Foyt	1-3, 5, 7-10, 12
(United States) Agajanian	King	Offenhauser	(United States) Gary Bettenhausen	4-9, 11-12, 14
(United States) All American Racers	Eagle (1-7 9-10, 12); Lightning (11)	Offenhauser	(United States) Pancho Carter	1-7, 9-12
(United States) Alex Morales	Lightning	Offenhauser	(United States) Pancho Carter	14
(United States) Alex Morales	Lightning	Offenhauser	(United States) Bobby Olivero	5-7, 10-14
(United States) Interscope Racing	Parnelli	Cosworth	(United States) Danny Ongais	1-3, 5-14
(United States) Jerry O"Connell Racing	Eagle (1-4, 14); Lightning (5-7, 9, 12-13)	Offenhauser	(United States) Mike Mosley	1-7, 9, 12-14
(United States) Joe Hunt	Eagle	Offenhauser	(United States) Gary Bettenhausen	1-2
(United States) Leader Card Racing	Eagle	Offenhauser	(United States) Tom Bigelow	All
(United States) Lindsey Hopkins Racing	Lightning	Offenhauser	(United States) Roger McCluskey	2-3, 5-13
(United Kingdom) McLaren	McLaren	Cosworth	(United States) Johnny Rutherford	All
(United States) Patrick Racing	Wildcat	DGS	(United States) Gordon Johncock	All
(United States) Patrick Racing	Wildcat	DGS	(United States) Wally Dallenbach	All
(United States) Team Penske	McLaren (1-8, 11, 14); Penske (9-10, 12-13)	Cosworth (1-13); Offenhauser (14)	(United States) Tom Sneva	All
(United States) Team Penske	McLaren (2, 4-5, 7, 12, 14); Penske (13)	Cosworth (2, 5, 7, 12-14); Offenhauser (4)	(United States) Mario Andretti	2, 4-5, 7, 12-14
(United States) Vel's Parnelli Jones Racing	Parnelli	Cosworth	(United States) Al Unser	1-3, 5-14

== Schedule and results ==
Rnd	Date	Race name	Track	Location	Pole position	Winning driver
1	March 6	Datsun Twin 200s	O Ontario Motor Speedway	Ontario, California	(United States) Johnny Rutherford	(United States) A. J. Foyt
2	March 27	Jimmy Bryan 150	O Phoenix International Raceway	Avondale, Arizona	(United States) Johnny Rutherford	(United States) Johnny Rutherford
3	April 2	Texas Grand Prix	O Texas World Speedway	College Station, Texas	(United States) Johnny Rutherford	(United States) Tom Sneva
4	April 30	Trenton 200	O Trenton International Speedway	Trenton, New Jersey	(United States) Johnny Rutherford	(United States) Wally Dallenbach Sr.
5	May 29	International 500 Mile Sweepstakes	O Indianapolis Motor Speedway	Speedway, Indiana	(United States) Tom Sneva	(United States) A. J. Foyt
6	June 12	Rex Mays Classic 150	O Wisconsin State Fair Park Speedway	West Allis, Wisconsin	(United States) Bobby Unser	(United States) Johnny Rutherford
7	June 26	Schaefer 500	O Pocono International Raceway	Long Pond, Pennsylvania	(United States) A. J. Foyt	(United States) Tom Sneva
8	July 3	Molson Diamond Indy	R Mosport Park	Bowmanville, Ontario	(United States) Al Unser	(United States) A. J. Foyt
9	July 17	Norton 200	O Michigan International Speedway	Brooklyn, Michigan	(United States) Tom Sneva	(United States) Danny Ongais
10	July 31	American Parts 200	O Texas World Speedway	College Station, Texas	(United States) Danny Ongais	(United States) Johnny Rutherford
11	August 21	Tony Bettenhausen 200	O Wisconsin State Fair Park Speedway	West Allis, Wisconsin	(United States) Danny Ongais	(United States) Johnny Rutherford
12	September 4	California 500	O Ontario Motor Speedway	Ontario, California	(United States) Johnny Rutherford	(United States) Al Unser
13	September 17	Michigan Grand Prix	O Michigan International Speedway	Brooklyn, Michigan	(United States) Danny Ongais	(United States) Gordon Johncock
-	September 24	Machinists Union 150	O Trenton International Speedway	Trenton, New Jersey	Race postponed due to rain; eventually cancelled	
14	October 29	Bobby Ball 150	O Phoenix International Raceway	Avondale, Arizona	(United States) Bobby Unser	(United States) Gordon Johncock

O Oval/Speedway
R Road Course
- The Machinist Union 150, scheduled for September 24, was first postponed due to rain, and was eventually cancelled on October 3.

== Final points standings ==
Pos	Driver	ONT1	PHX1	TWS1	TRE1	INDY	MIL1	POC	MOS	MIS1	TWS2	MIL2	ONT2	MIS2	TRE2	PHX2	Pts
1	(United States) Tom Sneva	14	16	1	10	**2**	2	1	3	**4**	5	18	3	10	C	17	3965
2	(United States) Al Unser	2	9	2		3	3	25	**17**	16	21	15	1	4	C	2	3030
3	(United States) Johnny Rutherford	**25**	**1**	**4**	**8**	33	1	5	9	3	1	1	**24**	2	C	22	2840
4	(United States) A. J. Foyt	1	2	14		1		**15**	1	Wth	19		2		C		2840
5	(United States) Gordon Johncock	5	12	9	2	11	12	3	18	2	2	10	11	1	C	1	2830
6	(United States) Wally Dallenbach Sr.	18	10	3	1	4	15	4	16	8	17	3	20	3	C	6	2635
7	(United States) Mario Andretti		DNS		16	26		2					4	20	C	4	1580
8	(United States) Pancho Carter	3	20	11	9	15	5	20		10	3	2	14			3	1420
9	(United States) Tom Bigelow	4	4	12	15	6	7	29	8	11	10	4	28	15	C	19	1370
10	(United States) Mike Mosley	16	6	5	3	19	4	8		Wth			16	18	C	DNQ	1030
11	(United States) Roger McCluskey	22	3	17	5	8	19	26	11	20	DNQ	20	22	7	C	5	940
12	(United States) Danny Ongais RY	7	5	13		20	17	23	15	1	**13**	**21**	8	**17**	C	12	935
13	(United States) Bobby Olivero					25	6	32			9	6	5	9	C	21	920
14	(United States) Gary Bettenhausen	10	11		11	16	20	7	2	17		8	17		C	14	850
15	(United States) Johnny Parsons	DNS				5	Wth	11		18	4	13	29	14	C	20	840
16	(United States) Larry Dickson	13	DNQ	18	Wth	DNQ			13	5	8	12	7	6	C	18	740
17	(United States) Lee Kunzman					7		6	DNS		22		15	16		Wth	700
18	(United States) Todd Gibson	11	13	6	6	DNQ	14	Wth	4	15		DNQ					600
19	(United States) Rick Mears	24	DNQ	15		DNQ		30		6	7	5	26	8	C		555
20	(United States) Spike Gehlhausen	26	14	8	12	DNQ	9	Wth	10	9	12	7	13	13	C	7	550
21	(United States) Jim McElreath					23		24		12	6		9	5			530
22	(Australia) Vern Schuppan	8	8	16	17	DNQ		21	19				6				475
23	(United States) Salt Walther	23	18		4	DNQ	18	12	6				25	Wth	C	13	450
24	(United States) Dick Simon	6	7			31	13	16		19	14	9	33		C	11	360
25	(United States) Steve Krisiloff	21				9		22	14	7	DNQ	19	27				320
26	(United States) James McElreath R		DNQ	7	7	DNQ		31			DNQ	DNQ	23	19	C		240
27	(United States) Bill Vukovich II	20	19		13	17		9	12	14			31				220
28	(United States) Joe Saldana R					DNQ	11	10		DNS	18	11	DNQ	22	C		220
29	(United States) Jerry Grant					Wth		13	5	DNQ	Wth	16					200
30	(Canada) Ed Crombie						10		7		Wth	14					165
31	(United States) Jerry Sneva					10		18	Wth	DNQ		22	DNQ	Wth	C		150
32	(United States) John Martin					DNQ							10				150
33	(United States) Larry Cannon					DNQ							12	12	C	9	125
34	(United States) Bill Simpson	9	22			Wth											80
35	(United States) Bobby Unser	15	17			18	**16**	19		21	15	17	30			**8**	75
36	(United States) Clark Templeman R						8										75
37	(United States) Al Loquasto	19	21			28		28			11		19	11	C	16	70
38	(United States) Gary Irvin R	Wth		10	14	DNQ											60
39	(United States) Bill Puterbaugh					12											50
40	(United States) George Snider					24		33		Wth	20		32	21	C	10	45
41	(Canada) Cliff Hucul R	12	15	19		22										DNQ	20
-	(United States) Phil Threshie R									13	16		DNQ				0
-	(Canada) Eldon Rasmussen					13							21				0
-	(United States) John Mahler					14		14		Wth							0
-	(United States) Tom Gloy R															15	0
-	(United States) Janet Guthrie	Wth				29		17					18		C		0
-	(United States) Lloyd Ruby	17				27											0
-	(United States) Bubby Jones					21								DNQ	C	DNQ	0
-	(United States) Bob Harkey					DNQ				22			DNQ				0
-	(United States) Chuck Gurney							27					Wth				0
-	(Switzerland) Clay Regazzoni R					30											0
-	(United States) Sheldon Kinser					32											0
-	(Sweden) Bertil Roos													DNQ	C	DNQ	0
-	(United States) Jerry Karl					DNQ										DNQ	0
-	(United States) Ed Finley						Wth								C	DNQ	0
-	(United States) Larry McCoy					DNQ		Wth									0
-	(United States) Jim Hurtubise					DNQ											0
-	(United States) Mel Kenyon					DNQ											0
-	(Belgium) Teddy Pilette					DNQ											0
-	(Australia) Alan Jones	Wth															0
-	(United States) Tom Frantz					Wth											0
-	(United States) Jack Owen														C		0
Pos	Driver	ONT1	PHX1	TWS1	TRE1	INDY	MIL1	POC	MOS	MIS1	TWS2	MIL2	ONT2	MIS2	TRE2	PHX2	Pts

Color	Result
Gold	Winner
Silver	2nd place
Bronze	3rd place
Green	4th & 5th place
Light Blue	6th-10th place
Dark Blue	Finished (Outside Top 10)
Purple	Did not finish (Ret)
Red	Did not qualify (DNQ)
Brown	Withdrawn (Wth)
Black	Disqualified (DSQ)
White	Did not start (DNS)
Blank	Did not participate (DNP)
Blank	Not competing

**In-line notation**
**Bold**	Pole position
Italics	Ran fastest race lap
*	Led most race laps
RY Rookie of the Year
R Rookie

== See also ==
- 1977 Indianapolis 500
