= 1979 USAC Championship Car season =

Sports season

- USAC National Championship Trail

Season
- Races: 7
- Start date: March 25
- End date: August 12

Awards
- National champion: (United States) A. J. Foyt
- Indianapolis 500 winner: (United States) Rick Mears

The 1979 USAC Championship Car season consisted of seven races, beginning in Ontario, California on March 25 and concluding in West Allis, Wisconsin on August 12. The USAC National Champion was A. J. Foyt and the Indianapolis 500 winner was Rick Mears.

The season was heavily affected by the decision from Championship Auto Racing Teams (CART) to stage its own, competing Indy Car championship. Created in the summer of 1978 as an organization of team owners in the style of the Formula One Constructors Association, a series of disagreements with USAC led to the group, composed of the vast majority of top USAC teams and drivers, to form a separate series, which also took away a considerable number of race venues.

Foyt, who had initially sided with CART, re-enacted its USAC membership for the season, being the only driver within the top 12 in points for 1978 to come back to the series. As a result, Foyt dominated the season, winning five of the meager seven races sanctioned by USAC. The controversy over the first "split" in Indy car racing came to its first climax at the 1979 Indianapolis 500, when USAC rejected entries by certain CART owners. The owners won a court injunction to be allowed to race, and later, another controversy erupted, this time involving illegal wastegate exhaust pipes.

== Confirmed entries ==
Team	Chassis	Engine	No	Drivers	Rounds
Agajanian-King Racers	Kingfish 73	Chevrolet	97	(United States) Phil Threshie	3–5
Agajanian-King Racers	Kingfish 73	Chevrolet	97	(United States) Jerry Miller	7
Agajanian-King Racers	Kingfish 73	Chevrolet	98	(United States) Gary Bettenhausen	3–5
Agajanian-King Racers	Kingfish 73	Chevrolet	98	(United States) George Snider	7
AMI Racing	Lola T500B	Cosworth	43 (Note: Raced as #44 at the Indianapolis 500.)	(United States) Tom Bigelow	All
AMI Racing	Lola T500B	Cosworth	44	(United States) Roger McCluskey	4–7
AMI Racing	Lola T500B	Cosworth	45	(United States) Janet Guthrie	1, 3, 5, 7
AMI Racing	Lola T500B	Cosworth	45	(United States) George Snider	1–2
AMI Racing	Wildcat Mk. II	DGS	46	(United States) Gary Bettenhausen	1–2, 6–7
AMI Racing	Wildcat Mk. II	DGS	46	(United States) Howdy Holmes	3, 5
AMI Racing	Wildcat Mk. II	DGS	46	(United States) Greg Leffler	4
B/M Enterprises	Antares 72	Offenhauser	50	(Canada) Frank Weiss	1, 3–5, 7
B/M Enterprises	Antares 72	Offenhauser	50	(Canada) Eldon Rasmussen	3
Beaudoin Racing	Wildcat Mk. II	DGS	83	(United States) Billy Engelhart	3
Beith Racing	Eagle 72	Offenhauser	28	(United States) Billy Scott	3
Bruce Crower	Eagle 74	Chevrolet	57	(United States) Jerry Sneva	1–3, 5 (Note: Jerry Sneva switched to Hodgdon Racing for the second weekend of Indy 500 time trials, and to Wayne Woodward for the Pocono 500 qualifying.)
Fiore Racing	McLaren M16C/D	Offenhauser	88	(United States) Ken Nichols	1
Gibson Racing	Eagle 74	DGS	75	(United States) Todd Gibson	1–3
Gilmore Racing	Parnelli VPJ6CT; Coyote IV (Note: Used at the first Texas World race.)	Cosworth; Foyt	14	(United States) A. J. Foyt	All
Hodgdon Racing	McLaren M24	Cosworth	72	(United States) Roger McCluskey	1, 3
Hodgdon Racing	Spirit 78	AMC	73	(United States) Neil Bonnett	3
Hodgdon Racing	Spirit 78	AMC	73	(United States) Jerry Sneva	3
Hucul Racing	McLaren M16E	Offenhauser	29	(Canada) Cliff Hucul	All
Jim Hurtubise	Mallard 71	Offenhauser	56	(United States) Jim Hurtubise	3
Joe Hunt	Eagle 73	Offenhauser	99	(United States) Bob Harkey	1
Leader Card	Watson 77	Offenhauser	22	(United States) Bill Vukovich II	All
Leader Card	Watson 78	Offenhauser	24	(United States) Sheldon Kinser	All
Leader Card	Watson 79	Offenhauser	40	(United States) George Snider	3 (Note: Snider switched to Hoffman Auto Racing for a special qualifying session for bumped cars at the Indy 500, after the #40 was withdrawn due to a blown engine.)
Lindsey Hopkins	Lightning Mk1/79; Lightning X-15 (Note: Used by Parsons at the 500 events and both Milwaukee races.)	Offenhauser	15	(United States) Johnny Parsons	1–5, 7
Lindsey Hopkins	Lightning Mk1/79; Lightning X-15	Offenhauser	51	(United States) Hurley Haywood	1, 3
Lindsey Hopkins	Lightning Mk1/79; Lightning X-15	Offenhauser	51	(United States) George Snider	5
Loquasto Racing	McLaren M16C/D	Offenhauser	86	(United States) Al Loquasto	5
McElreath Racing	Eagle 73/74; Penske PC-6/78 (Note: Used by McElreath at the Indy 500.)	Chevrolet	26	(United States) Tony Bettenhausen Jr.	2
McElreath Racing	Eagle 73/74; Penske PC-6/78	Offenhauser; Cosworth (Note: Used by McElreath at the Indy 500, and by Threshie.)	26	(United States) Jim McElreath	5–7
McElreath Racing	Eagle 73/74; Penske PC-6/78	Offenhauser; Cosworth	23	(United States) Jim McElreath	1–3
McElreath Racing	Eagle 73/74; Penske PC-6/78	Offenhauser; Cosworth	23	(United States) Phil Threshie	6
Medlin Racing	Cicada Mk.IV	Offenhauser	35	(United States) Bill Puterbaugh	3–4, 7
Mergard Racing	Eagle 72	Offenhauser	42	(United States) Herm Johnson	7
Polak Racing	Penske PC-5/77	Cosworth	80	(United States) Larry Dickson	3–7
Rager Racing	Eagle 68	Chevrolet	66	(United States) Roger Rager	3–4, 6–7
Rasmussen Racing	Rascar 72	Foyt; Chevrolet (Note: Used at Pocono.)	58	(Canada) Eldon Rasmussen	1–3, 5 (Note: Rasmussen switched to B/M Enterprises after a crash during Indy 500 practice.)
Raymond Reimer	March 73A	Chevrolet	93	(United States) Larry McCoy	3
Raymond Reimer	March 73A	Chevrolet	93	(United States) Dana Carter	6
Raymond Reimer	March 73A	Chevrolet	93	(United States) Jan Sneva	7
Rhoades Competition	McLaren M16E	Offenhauser	20	(United States) John Martin	3, 5
Robert LaWarre	Eagle 68	Chevrolet	60	(United States) Tony Bettenhausen Jr.	4–5
Robert LaWarre	McLaren M16C/D	Offenhauser	86	(United States) Tony Bettenhausen Jr.	6–7
Thunder Racing	McLaren M16C/D	Offenhauser	30	(United States) Larry Dickson	1–2
Thunder Racing	McLaren M16C/D	Offenhauser	30	(United States) Dana Carter	3–5
Vollstedt Racing	Vollstedt 77	Offenhauser	17	(United States) Dick Simon	1, 3–7
Vollstedt Racing	Vollstedt 73	Offenhauser	27	(United States) John Martin	1
Vollstedt Racing	Vollstedt 73	AMC	27	(United States) George Snider	4
Vollstedt Racing	Vollstedt 73	AMC	27	(United States) Bob Harkey	5
Wayne Woodward	Eagle 72	Offenhauser	42	(United States) Dick Ferguson	1
Wayne Woodward	Eagle 74	Offenhauser	81	(United States) Dana Carter	1
Wayne Woodward	Eagle 74	Offenhauser	81	(United States) Dick Ferguson (Note: Jan Opperman took some laps for his refresher test at the Indy 500.)	2–3
Wayne Woodward	Eagle 74	Offenhauser	81	(United States) Jerry Sneva	4–7
William R. Compton	McLaren M16C/D	Offenhauser	38	(United States) Jerry Karl	All
CART entrants - ineligible to score points.
Alex Morales Co.	Lightning Mk1/77	Offenhauser	10	(United States) Pancho Carter	3
All American Racers	Eagle 78 MkII	Cosworth	36	(United States) Mike Mosley	3
Cannon Racing Team	Wildcat Mk. I	DGS	95	(United States) Larry Cannon	3
Chaparral Racing	Chaparral 2K	Cosworth	2	(United States) Al Unser	3
Conqueste Racing	Parnelli VPJ6CT	Cosworth	89	(United States) Lee Kunzman	3
Fletcher Racing	Lightning Mk1/77	Cosworth	7	(United States) Steve Krisiloff	3
Frantz Auto Body	Wildcat Mk. I	DGS	16	(United States) Tom Frantz	3
Gehlhausen-Reath Racing	Wildcat Mk. I (Note: Car loaned by Patrick Racing at the Indy 500 for Gehlhausen.)	Cosworth	19 (Note: Gehlhausen was bumped from the Indy 500 field and loaned the #90 car from Patrick Racing, which he qualified. Later, the #19 was allowed to requalify in a special session, but it also failed to qualify with other drivers. For race day, the #90 was renumbered as #19.)	(United States) Spike Gehlhausen	3
Gehlhausen-Reath Racing	Eagle 74	Offenhauser	19	(United States) Bob Harkey	3
Gehlhausen-Reath Racing	Eagle 74	Offenhauser	19	(United States) Bill Alsup	3
Gehlhausen-Reath Racing	Eagle 74	Offenhauser	39	(United States) Al Loquasto	3
Hoffman Auto Racing	Lightning Mk1/77	Offenhauser	59	(United States) George Snider	3 (Note: Eligible to score points at the Indy 500, as he had competed with USAC teams earlier in the year.)
Hoffman Auto Racing	Eagle 72	Offenhauser	69	(United States) Joe Saldana	3
Intercomp Racing	Eagle 72	Offenhauser	92	(United States) John Mahler	3
Interscope Racing	Parnelli VPJ6CT	Cosworth	25	(United States) Danny Ongais (Note: George Snider practiced with the car at Indianapolis as a standby for a possible qualifying attempt after Ongais suffered a concussion in a crash.)	3, 5
Jerry O'Connell Racing	McLaren M24	Cosworth	1	(United States) Tom Sneva	3
Longhorn Racing	Penske PC-6/78	Cosworth	11	(United States) Tom Bagley	3
Patrick Racing	Penske PC-6/78	Cosworth	3	(United States) Gordon Johncock	3
Patrick Racing	Penske PC-6/78	Cosworth	6	(United States) Wally Dallenbach	3
Penske Racing	Penske PC-6/78	Cosworth	9	(United States) Rick Mears	3
Penske Racing	Penske PC-7/79	Cosworth	12	(United States) Bobby Unser	3
Penske Racing	Penske PC-7/79	Cosworth	68	(United States) Bill Alsup	3 (Note: Alsup switched to Gehlhausen-Reath at the special qualifying session for bumped cars at the Indy 500, after his Penske ride was disqualified for a technical infringement.)
S&M Electric	Lightning Mk1/77	Offenhauser	31	(United States) Larry Rice	3
Team McLaren	McLaren M24B	Cosworth	4	(United States) Johnny Rutherford	3
Walmotor	Penske PC-6/78	Cosworth	77	(United States) Salt Walther	3
WASP Racing	McLaren M16C/D	Offenhauser	41	(United States) Bill Alsup	3 (Note: Alsup switched to a Penske Racing back-up car for Bump Day at the Indy 500.)
Wysard Motor Co.	Wildcat Mk. II	DGS	34	(Australia) Vern Schuppan	3

== Schedule ==
USAC announced a 10-race schedule on December 27, 1978, a considerable downsizing from its 18-race schedule in 1978 due to the creation of the competing SCCA/CART Indy Car Series. However, three races switched to CART sanctioning during 1979, and only seven races were held by USAC. For the first time since 1976, all races were held on ovals.

Rd.	Date	Race name	Track	Location
1	March 25	Datsun Twin 200	Ontario Motor Speedway	Ontario, California
2	April 8	Coors 200	Texas World Speedway	College Station, Texas
3	May 27	International 500 Mile Sweepstakes	Indianapolis Motor Speedway	Speedway, Indiana
4	June 10	Rex Mays Classic	Wisconsin State Fair Park Speedway	West Allis, Wisconsin
5	June 24	Music 500 at Pocono	Pocono International Raceway	Long Pond, Pennsylvania
6	July 29	Lubrilon Grand Prix	Texas World Speedway	College Station, Texas
7	August 12	Tony Bettenhausen 200	Wisconsin State Fair Park Speedway	West Allis, Wisconsin

=== Schedule changes ===
All four races at Michigan International Speedway and Phoenix International Raceway, owned by CART founders Roger Penske and Bob Fletcher, went off the schedule. While the announcement mentioned an 11th race at Atlanta International Speedway with no date set, the track had already arranged its preferred April 22 date with CART, and no agreement was reached with USAC, which had promised Trenton a race on the same date. The Molson Diamond Indy at Mosport also switched allegiances to CART, while both English visits at Silverstone and Brands Hatch were discontinued.

The season was originally slated to begin on March 18 at Ontario, followed by an April 1 date at Texas World Speedway. On January 20, these two races were pushed back a week to avoid a conflict with the season finale of IROC VI at Atlanta. On January 23, Trenton Speedway announced that both of its races would move from USAC sanctioning to CART after being leased by Roger Penske. Trenton had been originally scheduled to host the season finale on September 23.

On July 3, Ontario Motor Speedway announced that the California 500 would also move to CART to guarantee participation from top drivers and teams, leaving USAC with just seven races on its schedule. In the following weeks, USAC proposed a Labor Day weekend race meet that would consist of a USAC Stock Car/Championship Car doubleheader at the Indianapolis Motor Speedway. A 250-mile stock car race on Saturday would be followed by a 250-mile Indy car race on Sunday. However, the plan never materialized.

==== Scheduled events that switched to CART sanctioning ====
Race name	Track	City	Original date
Trenton 200	O Trenton Speedway	Trenton, New Jersey	April 22
California 500	O Ontario Motor Speedway	Ontario, California	September 2
Trenton 150	O Trenton Speedway	Trenton, New Jersey	September 23

== Results ==
Rd.	Race	Pole position	Most laps led	Race winner				Report
Rd.	Race	Pole position	Most laps led	Driver	Team	Chassis	Engine	Report
1	Ontario	(United States) A. J. Foyt	(United States) A. J. Foyt	(United States) A. J. Foyt	Gilmore Racing	Parnelli VPJ6CT	Cosworth	
2	Texas World 1	(United States) A. J. Foyt	(United States) A. J. Foyt	(United States) A. J. Foyt	Gilmore Racing	Coyote IV	Foyt	
3	Indianapolis 500	(United States) Rick Mears^{A}	(United States) Bobby Unser^{A}	(United States) Rick Mears^{A}	Penske Racing	Penske PC-6/78	Cosworth	Report
4	Milwaukee 1	(United States) A. J. Foyt	(United States) A. J. Foyt	(United States) A. J. Foyt	Gilmore Racing	Parnelli VPJ6CT	Cosworth	
5	Pocono	(United States) A. J. Foyt	(United States) A. J. Foyt	(United States) A. J. Foyt	Gilmore Racing	Parnelli VPJ6CT	Cosworth	Report
6	Texas World 2	(United States) A. J. Foyt	(United States) A. J. Foyt	(United States) A. J. Foyt	Gilmore Racing	Parnelli VPJ6CT	Cosworth	
7	Milwaukee 2	(United States) Tom Bigelow	(United States) A. J. Foyt	(United States) Roger McCluskey	AMI Racing	Lola T500B	Cosworth	

^A Non-USAC drivers

== Final points standings ==
The CART drivers were not eligible for points.

Pos	Driver	ONT (United States)	TWS1 (United States)	INDY (United States)	MIL1 (United States)	POC (United States)	TWS2 (United States)	MIL2 (United States)	Pts
1	(United States) A. J. Foyt	**1***	**1***	2	**1***	**1***	**1***	12*	3320
2	(United States) Bill Vukovich II	3	6	8	2	6	6	3	1770
3	(United States) Tom Bigelow	6	12	14	3	8	2	**2**	1305
4	(United States) Larry Dickson	16	3	24	4	3	11	Wth	1225
5	(United States) Gary Bettenhausen	18	2	DNQ	6	9	5	6	1008
6	(United States) Jim McElreath	9	14	35		2	9	Wth	975
7	(United States) Jerry Sneva	21	13	31	5	4	12	10	851
8	(United States) Dick Simon	7		26	13	5	7	17	766
9	(United States) Roger McCluskey	12		13	17	14	4	1	716
10	(United States) Sheldon Kinser	4	8	28	15	15	3	14	673
11	(Canada) Cliff Hucul	5	4	29	7	11	16	19	653
12	(United States) Howdy Holmes RY			7		7			600
13	(United States) Johnny Parsons	2	16	32	14	21		4	598
14	(United States) George Snider	8	5	33	18	25		11	361
15	(United States) Janet Guthrie	Wth		34		19		5	225
16	(Canada) Frank Weiss	20		Wth	8	23		7	218
17	(United States) Tony Bettenhausen Jr. R		9		9	13	13	15	185
18	(United States) Dana Carter R	10		DNQ	11	22	10		165
19	(United States) Phil Threshie			17	16	16	8		153
20	(United States) Al Loquasto			DNQ		10			150
21	(United States) Todd Gibson	14	7	DNQ					130
22	(United States) Jerry Karl	DNS	10	DNQ	12	17	14	18	113
23	(United States) Herm Johnson							8	100
24	(Canada) Eldon Rasmussen	11	15	23		20			85
25	(United States) Jerry Miller R							9	80
26	(United States) Roger Rager			DNQ	10		15	16	65
27	(United States) Dick Ferguson R	17	11	DNQ					48
28	(United States) John Martin	15		DNQ		18			30
29	(United States) Bob Harkey	19		Wth		24			23
30	(United States) Bill Puterbaugh			DNQ	19			13	10
31	(United States) Ken Nichols	13							10
32	(United States) Jan Sneva R							20	8
-	(United States) Rick Mears			**1**					0
-	(United States) Mike Mosley			3					0
-	(United States) Danny Ongais			4		12			0
-	(United States) Bobby Unser			5*					0
-	(United States) Gordon Johncock			6					0
-	(United States) Tom Bagley			9					0
-	(United States) Spike Gehlhausen			10					0
-	(United States) Steve Krisiloff			11					0
-	(United States) Salt Walther			12					0
-	(United States) Tom Sneva			15					0
-	(United States) Joe Saldana			16					0
-	(United States) Johnny Rutherford			18					0
-	(United States) Larry Rice			19					0
-	(United States) Pancho Carter			20					0
-	(Australia) Vern Schuppan			21					0
-	(United States) Al Unser			22					0
-	(United States) John Mahler			25					0
-	(United States) Wally Dallenbach Sr.			27					0
-	(United States) Lee Kunzman			30					0
-	(United States) Larry McCoy			DNQ					0
-	(United States) Bill Alsup R			DNQ					0
-	(United States) Larry Cannon			DNQ					0
-	(United States) Billy Engelhart R			DNQ					0
-	(United States) Tom Frantz			DNQ					0
-	(United States) Hurley Haywood R			DNQ					0
-	(United States) Jim Hurtubise			DNQ					0
-	(United States) Billy Scott			DNQ					0
-	(United States) Neil Bonnett R			Wth					0
-	(United States) Greg Leffler R				Wth				0
Pos	Driver	ONT (United States)	TWS1 (United States)	INDY (United States)	MIL1 (United States)	POC (United States)	TWS2 (United States)	MIL2 (United States)	Pts

Color	Result
Gold	Winner
Silver	2nd place
Bronze	3rd place
Green	4th & 5th place
Light Blue	6th-10th place
Dark Blue	Finished (Outside Top 10)
Purple	Did not finish (Ret)
Red	Did not qualify (DNQ)
Brown	Withdrawn (Wth)
Black	Disqualified (DSQ)
White	Did not start (DNS)
Blank	Did not participate (DNP)
Blank	Not competing

**In-line notation**
**Bold**	Pole position
Italics	Ran fastest race lap
*	Led most race laps
RY Rookie of the Year
R Rookie

== See also ==
- 1979 Indianapolis 500
- 1979 SCCA/CART Indy Car Series
