= 1979 Champ Car season =

The 1979 Champ Car season may refer to:

- the 1979 USAC Championship Car season
- the 1979 SCCA/CART Indy Car Series, sanctioned by CART, who would later become Champ Car
