= Tom Sneva =

American racing driver (born 1948)

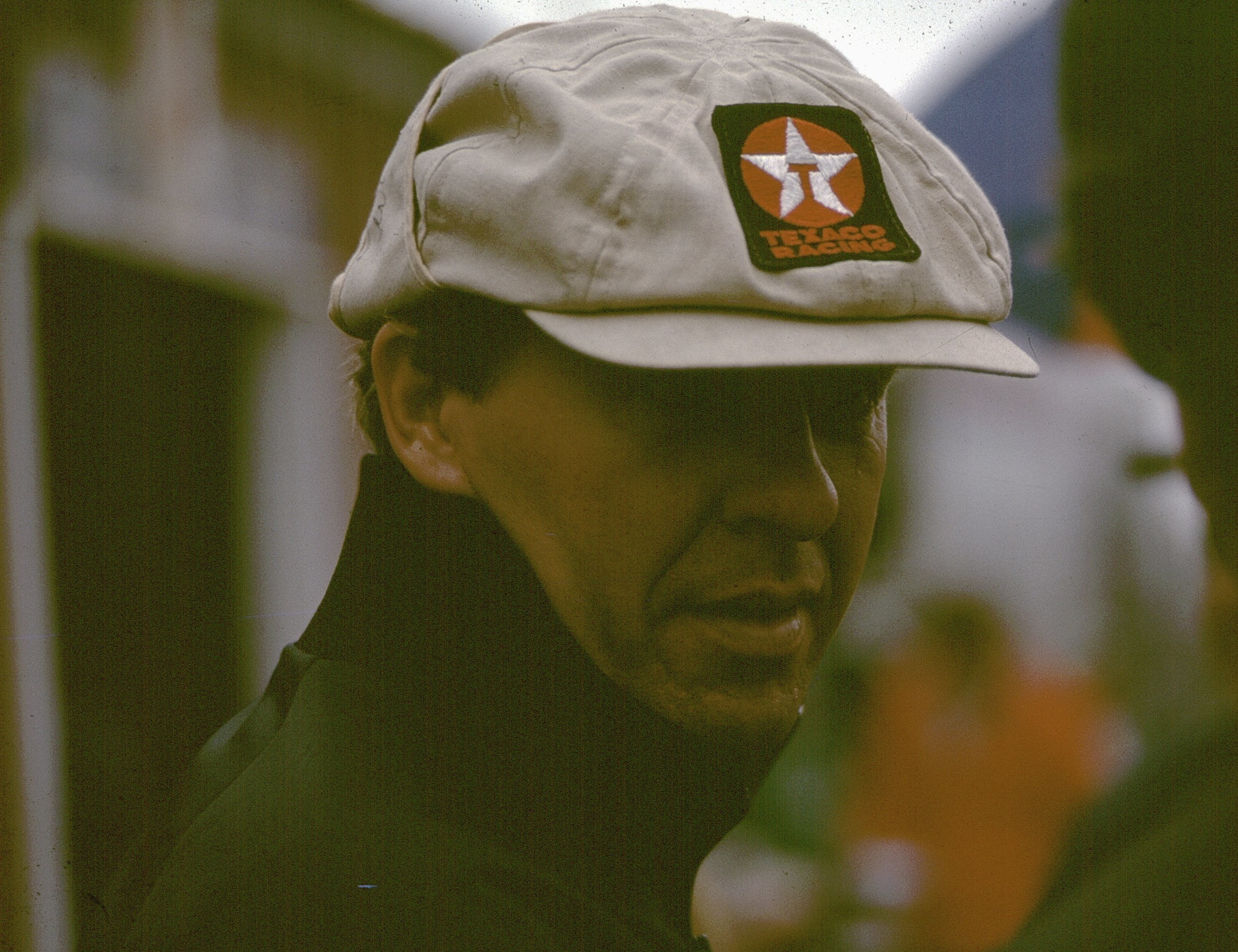
- Sneva in the 1980s
- Born: Thomas Edsol Sneva; June 1, 1948 (age 78) Spokane, Washington, U.S.

Championship titles
- USAC Championship Car (1977, 1978); Major victories Pocono 500 (1977); Indianapolis 500 (1983)

Champ Car career
- 205 races run over 22 years
- Best finish: 1st (1977, 1978)
- First race: 1971 Marlboro 300 (Trenton)
- Last race: 1992 Indianapolis 500 (Indianapolis)
- First win: 1975 Michigan Grand Prix (Michigan)
- Last win: 1984 Caesars Palace Grand Prix (Caesars Palace)
Wins	Podiums	Poles
13	50	14

NASCAR Cup Series career
- 8 races run over 7 years
- Best finish: 53rd (1982)
- First race: 1977 National 500 (Charlotte)
- Last race: 1987 Daytona 500 (Daytona)
Wins	Top tens	Poles
0	1	0

Thomas Edsol Sneva (/ˈsniːvə/ SNEE-və; born June 1, 1948) is an American former race car driver who won the Indianapolis 500 in 1983. He primarily raced in Indy cars, and was named to the Motorsports Hall of Fame of America in 2005.

A former math teacher and junior high principal from Spokane, Washington, Sneva's win at Indianapolis came after three runner-up finishes and a spectacular crash in 1975. Nicknamed "the Gas Man," he was an outstanding qualifier, winning the pole position three times (1977, 1978, 1984). In 1977, he won the pole position with a new track record, becoming the first driver to break the 200 mph barrier at the Indianapolis Motor Speedway. He was also the fastest qualifier on a fourth occasion in 1981, but because of qualifying rules did not start the race from the pole position that year.

Sneva won two consecutive USAC National Championships for Indy cars in 1977 and 1978.

== Career ==
Born in Spokane, to Edsol "Ed" and Joan, Sneva's first powered vehicle was a go-kart, which he received at the age of fourteen; by the age of eighteen, he was racing stock cars. Sneva graduated from Lewis and Clark High School, where he played football and basketball, before attending Eastern Washington State College, where he played a year of college basketball. After graduating from Eastern, he was hired by the high school in Sprague, where he taught math and physical education. Sneva was the eldest of five brothers, all racers; the next oldest was Jerry, who also competed at Indy.

At Indianapolis in 1977, Sneva drove his famed Norton Spirit McLaren M24/Cosworth racer for car owner Roger Penske, and became the first driver to qualify for the Indianapolis 500 at a speed at 200 mph (321.9 km/h) or more. His one-lap track record on May 14 was 200.535 mph (322.7 km/h).

Sneva won two races in 1977, including a 1-2 finish for Team Penske at the Pocono 500, and became the first driver in Team Penske history to win a championship. In 1978, Sneva did not win a race but with five second-place finishes and sixteen top-fives, Sneva still won the championship. Despite this, Sneva was released by Penske after the 1978 season. Although it was speculated that his dismissal was for not winning to Penske's expectations, Penske later said in a 2009 Centennial Era interview that, in reality, he and Sneva had disagreements on the direction of the team, and that was the reason for them parting ways.(30) Sneva exercised a stock option on Penske Automotive Group shortly after his dismissial, a prudent decision that paid dividends down the road.

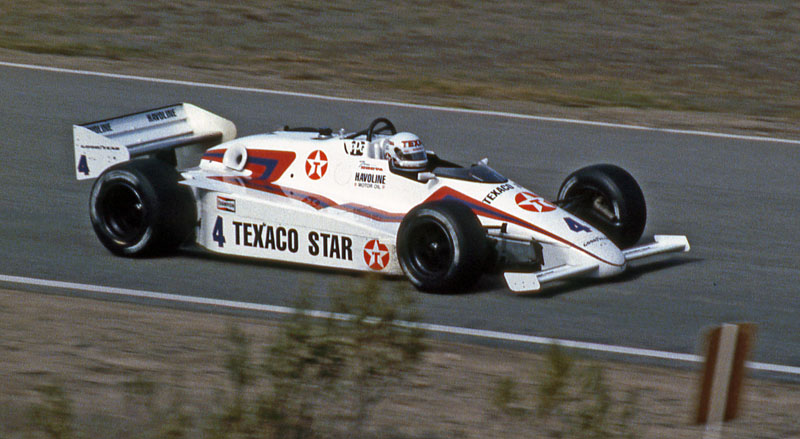
Sneva's March 84C at Laguna Seca in 1984.

In 1984, Sneva became the first to qualify for the Indianapolis 500 over 210 mph (338.0 km/h) in his Texaco Star March 84C/Cosworth driving for the new Mayer Motor Racing team. His one and four lap track records on May 12 were 210.689 mph (339.1 km/h) and 210.029 mph (338.0 km/h).

Sneva's career at the Indianapolis 500 was known for fast qualifying, second-place finishes, near misses and several crashes. Three times (1977, 1978, 1980) Sneva ended up the bridesmaid by finishing second. Finally, Sneva broke through in dramatic fashion in 1983 after a thrilling late race duel with Penske driver Al Unser and the lapped car of Unser's rookie son, Al Jr. It was Sneva's 1983 win in his Texaco Star March 83C/Cosworth for Bignotti-Cotter Racing that led to his nickname of "the Gas Man." That win was also famous for it being the last of George Bignotti's record seven Indianapolis 500 wins as a chief mechanic. For Sneva, the victory was sweet revenge, as he had been fired by Roger Penske in 1978 despite having won back-to-back USAC championships.

Sneva's second-place finish in 1980 is notable as it is one of only two occasions of such a finish by a driver starting last. It is also one of only three times the driver who started last (33rd) led laps during the race, a record matched by Alex Tagliani in 2016 and James Davison in 2017. Several other times Sneva was in contention for the win, but did not make it to the end of the race. It was during this time that Sneva, racing for Jerry O'Connell, became one of the first drivers at Indianapolis to race with a spotter, an idea Sneva attributed to his time coaching football, where common practice was to have an observer sitting high up in the media center. In 1981, Sneva charged hard from his 20th starting position to lead early in the race, but his untested Blue Poly March 81-C/Cosworth was fragile and his clutch failed early on. One year later, Sneva was in a duel with eventual winner Gordon Johncock and eventual runner-up Rick Mears when his engine in his Texaco Star March 82-C/Cosworth began losing power and eventually failed near the end of the race.

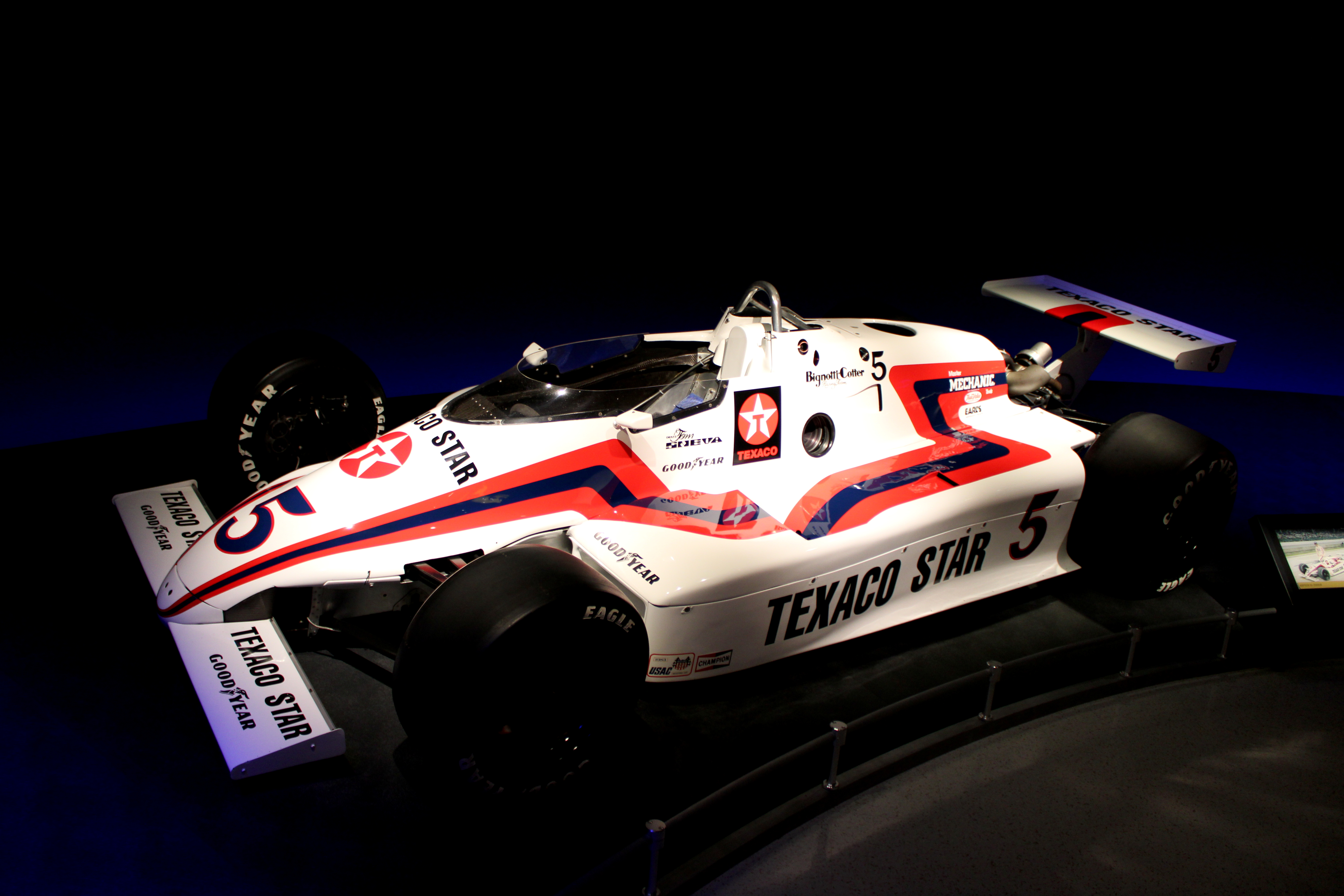
Sneva's winning car from the 1983 Indianapolis 500.

In 1983, Sneva captured his first Indianapolis 500 win, engaging in a duel with Al Unser and his son in the final twenty laps. Al Unser Jr. was widely criticized after the race for trying to impede Sneva to help his father win, as well as having passed several cars under caution, and jumping the final restart for which he received a two-lap penalty. As defending champion in 1984, Sneva dueled with Mears only 32 laps from the finish, but a CV joint failed, enabling Mears to win. The 1985 race was a testament to Sneva's ability as he drove an ill-handling Skoal Bandit Eagle/Cosworth to second place before exiting in a crash with the lapped car of Rich Vogler.

Sneva suffered one of the most famous crashes at Indianapolis during the 1975 race, his second. After touching wheels with Eldon Rasmussen, 26-year-old Sneva flipped up into the catch fence and tore his car in half, but suffered mostly minor burns on 15% of his body in the fiery crash. He walked to the ambulance but was placed in the intensive care unit at Methodist Hospital, mainly for lung issues due to the fire retardant. Describing the crash years later Sneva quipped, "In a situation like that it's important to talk to yourself: 'Faint, you coward, faint!'"

In 1986, Sneva was warming up his car during the pace lap, but lost control and crashed before the race started. In 1987, Sneva crashed three cars, two in practice, and one during the race. He crashed during the Indianapolis 500 in 1975, 1979, 1985, 1986, 1987, 1988, and 1992, a record for crashes during the race.

After Sneva's Indy victory in 1983, he never finished the race again. He dropped out of the race in 1984–1990, failed to qualify in 1991, and dropped out of the 1992 race as well. Some observers have attributed his decline in success to the switch to radial tires (the series transitioned to radials over a period from 1985 to 1987). His driving style was more apropos to bias ply tires.

Sneva showed his versatility by competing in eight NASCAR Winston Cup Series events in his career, spanning from 1977 to 1987. He earned one top-ten, a seventh in the 1983 Daytona 500.

Sneva's final start was the 1992 Indianapolis 500. He arrived at Indianapolis without a ride for 1993, and was unsuccessful in landing a car for the race. He retired with thirteen career Indycar wins and 14 pole positions.

After Sneva retired from driving, he was a color commentator for ABC television network's Wide World of Sports program and called several Indianapolis 500s. He is also heavily involved in the golf course business where he resides in Paradise Valley, Arizona.

== Personal life ==
Sneva's father, Edsol ("Ed") was a local racer in the Spokane region.

Sneva is the oldest of five brothers and one sister: Jerry, Jan, Blaine, Ed ("Babe") and Robin. He said the brothers were always racing something growing up. Babe (1951–1976) succumbed to severe head injuries more than eighteen months after a race crash in British Columbia.

Sneva was an ace in mathematics, and graduated from Eastern Washington State College in nearby Cheney with an education degree. He became a math teacher in a school district outside of Spokane city limits, and drove the school bus.

== Motorsports career results ==
=== American open-wheel racing ===
(key) (Races in bold indicate pole position)

==== USAC Championship Car ====
USAC Championship Car results
Year	Team	Chassis	Engine	1	2	3	4	5	6	7	8	9	10	11	12	13	14	15	16	17	18	Pos.	Pts
1970	Vollstedt Enterprises	Vollstedt 67	Ford 159ci V8t	PHX	SON	TRE	INDY	MIL	LAN	CDR	MCH	IRP	ISF	MIL	ONT	DSF	INF	SED	TRE	SAC	PHX; DNQ	NA	-
1971	Larry Kramer	Vollstedt 65	Chevrolet 320 ci V8	RAF	RAF	PHX	TRE	INDY	MIL	POC	MCH	MIL	ONT	TRE; 21	PHX; DNQ							NC	0
1973	Tipke Racing	Tipke 73	Offy 159 ci t	TWS; 26	TRE	TRE	INDY; DNQ	MIL														31st	30
1973	Carl Gehlhausen	Kingfish 72	Offy 159 ci t						POC; DNQ	MCH; 21	MIL; 14	ONT					TRE; 19	TWS	PHX; 14			31st	30
1973	Leader Card Racers	Eagle 68	Offy 159 ci t										ONT; 10	ONT; 17	MCH	MCH						31st	30
1974	Grant King Racers	Kingfish 73	Offy 159 ci t	ONT; 13	ONT	ONT; 12	PHX; 15	TRE; 11	INDY; 20	MIL; 14	POC; 13	MCH; 10	MIL; 14	MCH; 5	TRE; 8	TRE; 8	PHX; 24					18th	550
1975	Penske Racing	McLaren M16C	Offy 159 ci t	ONT; 9	ONT	ONT; 6	PHX; 7	**TRE**; 6	INDY; 22	MIL	POC; 29	MCH; 2	MIL; 3	MCH; 1	TRE; 13	PHX; 2						6th	1830
1976	Penske Racing	McLaren M16C	Offy 159 ci t	PHX; 17	TRE; 3	INDY; 6	MIL; 13	POC; 7	MCH; 6	TWS; 16	TRE; 3	MIL; 13	ONT; 26	MCH; 5	TWS							8th	1570
1976	Bruce H. Crower	Eagle 72	Crower 160 ci F8													PHX; DNS						8th	1570
1977	Penske Racing	McLaren M24	Cosworth DFX V8t	ONT; 14	PHX; 16	TWS; 1	TRE; 10	**INDY**; 2	MIL; 2	POC; 1	MOS; 3			MIL; 18			PHX; 17					1st	3965
1977	Penske Racing	Penske PC-5	Cosworth DFX V8t									**MCH**; 4	TWS; 5		ONT; 3	MCH; 10						1st	3965
1978	Penske Racing	Penske PC-6	Cosworth DFX V8t	PHX; 22	**ONT**; 2	TWS; 2	**TRE**; 3	**INDY**; 2	MOS; 4	MIL; 15	POC; 3	**MCH**; 2	**ATL**; 8	**TWS**; 5	MIL; 15	**ONT**; 23	MCH; 2	TRE; 3	SIL; 3	BRH; 2	PHX; 16	1st	4153
1979	Jerry O'Connell Racing	McLaren M24	Cosworth DFX V8t	ONT	TWS	INDY; 15	MIL	POC	TWS	MIL												NC	0
1980	Jerry O'Connell Racing	McLaren M24	Cosworth DFX V8t	ONT; 2	INDY; 2	MIL; 6	POC; 3	MOH; 11														2nd	1970
1981–82	Bignotti-Cotter Racing	March 81C	Cosworth DFX V8t	INDY; 25	POC; 16	ISF	DSF	INF														11th	635
1981–82	Bignotti-Cotter Racing	March 82C	Cosworth DFX V8t						INDY; 4													11th	635
1982–83	Bignotti-Cotter Racing	March 83C	Cosworth DFX V8t	ISF	DSF	NAZ	INDY; 1															1st	1000
1983–84	Mayer Motor Racing	March 84C	Cosworth DFX V8t	DSF	**INDY**; 16																	18th	25

==== PPG Indy Car World Series ====
PPG Indy Car World Series results
Year	Team	Chassis	Engine	1	2	3	4	5	6	7	8	9	10	11	12	13	14	15	16	17	Pos.	Pts	Ref
1979	Jerry O'Connell Racing	McLaren M24	Cosworth DFX V8t	PHX; 17	ATL; 3	ATL; 5	INDY; 15	TRE; 6	TRE; 15	MCH; 21	MCH; 2	WGL; 10	TRE; 3	ONT; 17	MCH; 2	ATL; 8	PHX; 5				7th	1360	
1980	Jerry O'Connell Racing	McLaren M24	Cosworth DFX V8t	ONT; 2	INDY; 2	MIL; 6	POC; 3	MOH; 11	MCH; 6	WGL; 4		ONT; 26	MCH; 6	MEX; 4							3rd	2930	
1980	Jerry O'Connell Racing	Phoenix 80	Cosworth DFX V8t								MIL; 16				PHX; 1						3rd	2930	
1981	Jerry O'Connell Racing	Phoenix 80	Cosworth DFX V8t	PHX; 3																	8th	96	
1981	Bignotti-Cotter Racing	Phoenix-March	Cosworth DFX V8t		MIL; 4	ATL	ATL														8th	96	
1981	Bignotti-Cotter Racing	March 81C	Cosworth DFX V8t					**MCH**; 23	RIV; 24	MIL; 1	MCH; 19	WGL; 21	MEX; 20	PHX; 1							8th	96	
1982	Bignotti-Cotter Racing	March 81C	Cosworth DFX V8t	PHX; 7	ATL; 17																5th	144	
1982	Bignotti-Cotter Racing	March 82C	Cosworth DFX V8t			MIL; 4	CLE; 20	MCH; 32	MIL; 1	POC; 19	RIV; 2	ROA; 9	MCH; 19	PHX; 1							5th	144	
1983	Bignotti-Cotter Racing	March 83C	Cosworth DFX V8t	ATL; 14	INDY; 1	MIL; 1	CLE; 5	MCH; 25		**POC**; 12	RIV; 5	MOH; 7	MCH; 21	CPL; 15		PHX; 3					4th	96	
1983	Bignotti-Cotter Racing	Theodore T83	Cosworth DFX V8t						ROA; 4						LAG; 18						4th	96	
1984	Mayer Motor Racing	March 84C	Cosworth DFX V8t	LBH; 3	**PHX**; 1	**INDY**; 16	MIL; 1	POR; 5	MEA; 6	CLE; 19	MCH; 2	ROA; 20	POC; 4	MOH; 7	SAN; 20	MCH; 2	PHX; 4	LAG; 10	CPL; 1		2nd	163	
1985	Curb-All American Racers	Eagle 85GC	Cosworth DFX V8t	LBH; 8	INDY; 20	MIL; 2		MEA; 6	CLE; 11	MCH; 3	ROA; 21	POC; 8	MOH; 15		MCH; 5			MIA; 21			7th	66	
1985	Curb-All American Racers	Lola T900	Cosworth DFX V8t				POR; 24							SAN; 7		LAG; 19	PHX; 19				7th	66	
1986	Curb Racing	March 86C	Cosworth DFX V8t	PHX; 2	LBH; 4	INDY; 33	MIL; 2	POR; 4	MEA; 17	CLE; 5	TOR; 9	MCH; 18	POC; 15	MOH; 12	SAN; 13	MCH; 5	ROA; 12	LAG; 22	PHX; 18	MIA; 22	10th	82	
1987	Curb Racing	March 87C	Cosworth DFX V8t	LBH; 3	PHX; 17		MIL; 13	POR; 21	MEA; 7	CLE; 8	TOR; 6	MCH; 30	POC	ROA	MOH	NAZ	LAG				14th	37	
1987	Curb Racing	March 86C	Buick 3300 V6t			INDY; 14															14th	37	
1987	Group 44 Racing	March 86C	Cosworth DFX V8t															MIA; 9			14th	37	
1988	Hemelgarn Racing	Lola T88/00	Judd AV V8t	PHX	LBH	INDY; 27	MIL	POR	CLE	TOR	MEA										45th	0	
1988	Hemelgarn Racing	Lola T88/00	Cosworth DFX V8t									MCH; 22	POC	MOH	ROA	NAZ	LAG	MIA			45th	0	
1989	Vince Granatelli Racing	Lola T88/00	Buick 3300 V6t	PHX; DNS		INDY; 27	MIL; 22	DET; 23			MEA; 27	TOR	MCH	POC	MOH	ROA	NAZ	LAG			28th	3	
1989	Vince Granatelli Racing	March 86C	Buick 3300 V6t		LBH; 10				POR; 26	CLE; 20											28th	3	
1990	Vince Granatelli Racing	Penske PC-18	Buick 3300 V6t	PHX	LBH	INDY; 30	MIL	DET	POR	CLE	MEA	TOR	MCH	DEN	VAN	MOH	ROA	NAZ	LAG		44th	0	
1991	Team Menard	Lola T89/00	Buick 3300 V6t	SRF	LBH	PHX	INDY; DNQ	MIL	DET	POR	CLE	MEA	TOR	MCH	DEN	VAN	MOH	ROA	NAZ	LAG	NA	-	
1992	Team Menard	Lola T91/00	Buick 3300 V6t	SRF	PHX	LBH	INDY; 31	DET	POR	MIL	NHA	TOR	MCH	CLE	ROA	VAN	MOH	NAZ	LAG		62nd	0	

===== Indianapolis 500 =====
Year	Chassis	Engine	Start	Finish	Team
1973	Tipke	Offenhauser	DNQ		Tipke Racing
1974	Kingfish	Offenhauser	8	20	Grant King Racers
1975	McLaren	Offenhauser	4	22	Penske Racing
1976	McLaren	Offenhauser	3	6	Penske Racing
1977	McLaren	Cosworth	**1**	2	Penske Racing
1978	Penske	Cosworth	**1**	2	Penske Racing
1979	McLaren	Cosworth	2	15	Jerry O'Connell Racing
1980	McLaren	Cosworth	33	2	Jerry O'Connell Racing
1981	March	Cosworth	20	25	Bignotti-Cotter Racing
1982	March	Cosworth	7	4	Bignotti-Cotter Racing
1983	March	Cosworth	4	**1**	Bignotti-Cotter Racing
1984	March	Cosworth	**1**	16	Mayer Motor Racing
1985	Eagle	Cosworth	13	20	Curb-All American Racers
1986	March	Cosworth	7	33	Curb Racing
1987	March	Buick	21	14	Curb Racing
1988	Lola	Judd	14	27	Hemelgarn Racing
1989	Lola	Buick	22	27	Vince Granatelli Racing
1990	Penske	Buick	25	30	Vince Granatelli Racing
1991	Lola	Buick	DNQ		Team Menard
1992	Lola	Buick	31	31	Team Menard

=== NASCAR ===
(key) (Bold – Pole position awarded by qualifying time. Italics – Pole position earned by points standings or practice time. * – Most laps led.)

==== Winston Cup Series ====
NASCAR Winston Cup Series results
Year	Team	No.	Make	1	2	3	4	5	6	7	8	9	10	11	12	13	14	15	16	17	18	19	20	21	22	23	24	25	26	27	28	29	30	31	NWCC	Pts	Ref
1977	Jim Stacy Racing	6	Dodge	RSD	DAY	RCH	CAR	ATL	NWS	DAR	BRI	MAR	TAL	NSV	DOV	CLT	RSD	MCH	DAY	NSV	POC	TAL	MCH	BRI	DAR	RCH	DOV	MAR	NWS	CLT; 27	CAR	ATL	ONT		NA	0	
1981		5	Buick	RSD	DAY; DNQ	RCH	CAR	ATL	BRI	NWS	DAR	MAR	TAL	NSV	DOV	CLT	TWS	RSD	MCH	DAY	NSV	POC	TAL	MCH	BRI	DAR	RCH	DOV	MAR	NWS	CLT	CAR	ATL	RSD	NA	-	
1982	Rogers Racing	37	Buick	DAY; 22	RCH; 31	BRI	ATL; 15	CAR	DAR	NWS	MAR	TAL	NSV	DOV	CLT	POC	RSD	MCH	DAY	NSV	POC	TAL	MCH	BRI	DAR	RCH	DOV	NWS	CLT	MAR	CAR	ATL	RSD		53rd	285	
1983	Bay Darnell	53	Chevy	DAY; 7	RCH	CAR	ATL	DAR	NWS	MAR	TAL	NSV	DOV	BRI	CLT	RSD	POC	MCH; 32	DAY	NSV	POC	TAL	MCH	BRI	DAR	RCH	DOV	MAR	NWS	CLT	CAR	ATL	RSD		75th	-	
1984	Harrington Racing	2	Buick	DAY; DNQ	RCH	CAR	ATL	BRI	NWS	DAR	MAR	TAL	NSV	DOV	CLT	RSD	POC	MCH	DAY	NSV	POC	TAL	MCH	BRI	DAR	RCH	DOV	MAR	CLT	NWS	CAR	ATL	RSD		NA	-	
1985	Curb Racing	42	Pontiac	DAY; DNQ	RCH	CAR	ATL; 32	BRI	DAR	NWS	MAR	TAL	DOV	CLT	RSD	POC	MCH	DAY	POC	TAL	MCH	BRI	DAR	RCH	DOV	MAR	NWS	CLT	CAR	ATL	RSD				NA	0	
1987	Jackson Bros. Motorsports	66	Olds	DAY; 29	CAR	RCH	ATL	DAR	NWS	BRI	MAR	TAL	CLT	DOV	POC	RSD	MCH	DAY	POC	TAL	GLN	MCH	BRI	DAR	RCH	DOV	MAR	NWS	CLT	CAR	RSD	ATL			90th	76	

===== Daytona 500 =====
Year	Team	Manufacturer	Start	Finish
1981		Buick	DNQ	
1982	Rogers Racing	Buick	25	22
1983	Bay Darnell	Chevrolet	22	7
1984	Harrington Racing	Buick	DNQ	
1985	Curb Racing	Pontiac	DNQ	
1987	Jackson Bros. Motorsports	Oldsmobile	29	29

=== International Race of Champions ===
(key) (Bold – Pole position. * – Most laps led.)

International Race of Champions results
Season	Make	Q1	Q2	Q3	1	2	3	4	Pos.	Pts	Ref
1977–78	Chevy				MCH; 11	RSD; 12	**RSD**; 11	DAY	11th	-	
1978–79	Chevy	MCH	MCH; 4	RSD	RSD; 8	ATL; 5			7th	-	
1979–80	Chevy	MCH	MCH; 7	RSD	RSD	ATL			NA	0	
1984	Chevy				MCH; 11	CLE; 11*	**TAL**; 8	MCH; 3	10th	29	
1985	Chevy				DAY; 2	MOH; 8	TAL; C	MCH; 7	4th	32	

== Awards ==
In 2004, Sneva was inducted into the Indianapolis Motor Speedway Hall of Fame. The following year, he was inducted into the Motorsports Hall of Fame of America.

Preceded by Gordon Johncock	Indianapolis 500 Winner; 1983	Succeeded by Rick Mears
