= 1979 Gould Twin Dixie 125 =

Second event of the 1979 CART season

(United States) 1979 Gould Dixie Twin 125
Race details
- Race 2 and 3 of 14 in the 1979 CART season
- Atlanta International Speedway until 1996
- Date: April 22, 1979
- Official name: Gould Dixie Twin 125
- Location: Atlanta Motor Speedway; Hampton, Georgia, United States
- Course: Oval; 1.522 mi / 2.450 km
- Distance: 82 laps 124.804 mi / 200.900 km
Race 1
- Weather: Unknown

Pole position
- Driver: (United States) Johnny Rutherford (Team McLaren)
- Time: 27.166

Fastest lap
- Driver: Unknown (Unknown)
- Time: Unknown (on lap Unknown of 82)

Podium
- First: (United States) Johnny Rutherford (Team McLaren)
- Second: (United States) Lee Kunzman (Conqueste Racing Team)
- Third: (United States) Tom Sneva (Jerry O'Connell Racing)
Race 2
- Weather: Unknown

Pole position
- Driver: (United States) Johnny Rutherford (Team McLaren)
- Time: None (Awarded as the Winner of Race 1)

Fastest lap
- Driver: Unknown (Unknown)
- Time: Unknown (on lap Unknown of 82)

Podium
- First: (United States) Johnny Rutherford (Team Mclaren)
- Second: (United States) Rick Mears (Team Penske)
- Third: (United States) Al Unser (Chaparral Cars)

The 1979 Gould Dixie Twin 125 was an Indy car racing event consisting of the second and third rounds of the 1979 CART season, held on April 22, at Atlanta Motor Speedway, Hampton, Georgia.

== Race 1 ==
=== Summary ===
Johnny Rutherford won the pole for the first race, with Gordon Johncock starting second, Mike Mosley in third, Danny Ongais in fourth, and Tom Sneva in fifth.

In the race, Rutherford and Johncock dominated the first 60 laps. After a caution period ended with just 14 laps to go, Lee Kunzman managed to jump out to the lead. Johnny Rutherford caught up to him with eight laps to go, and the two dueled, with Rutherford passing him on the penultimate lap and holding on to win. Tom Sneva claimed third, Gordon Johncock fourth, and Rick Mears fifth.

=== Results ===
Pos	Sta	No	Driver	Team	Laps	Time/Retired	Led	Pts
1	1	4	(United States) Johnny Rutherford	Team McLaren	82	47:28.000	30	250
2	9	21	(United States) Lee Kunzman	Conqueste Racing Team	82	-	12	200
3	5	1	(United States) Tom Sneva	Jerry O'Connell Racing	82	-	7	175
4	2	20	(United States) Gordon Johncock	Patrick Racing	82	-	32	150
5	11	9	(United States) Rick Mears	Team Penske	82	-	0	125
6	7	2	(United States) Al Unser	Chaparral Cars	82	-	0	100
7	8	12	(United States) Bobby Unser	Team Penske	82	-	1	75
8	16	11	(United States) Tom Bagley	Longhorn Racing	81	+ 1 Laps	0	63
9	13	10	(United States) Pancho Carter	Morales Motorsports	81	+ 1 Laps	0	50
10	14	77	(United States) Salt Walther	Walmotor	80	+ 2 Laps	0	38
11	6	40	(United States) Wally Dallenbach	Patrick Racing	79	+ 3 Laps	0	25
12	18	34	(Australia) Vern Schuppan	Wysard Racing	75	+ 7 Laps	0	13
13	15	69	(United States) Joe Saldana	Hoffman Racing	58	Fire	0	5
14	4	25	(United States) Danny Ongais	Interscope Racing	56	Fuel Line	0	5
15	12	7	(United States) Steve Krisiloff	Bob Fletcher Racing	53	Transmission	0	5
16	17	41	(United States) Bill Alsup	WASP Racing	42	Over-Heating	0	5
17	3	36	(United States) Mike Mosley	All American Racers	20	Gearbox	0	5
18	10	19	(United States) Spike Gehlhausen	Gehlhausen Racing	12	Ignition	0	5

=== Lap Leader Breakdown ===
Leader	From Lap	To Lap	Total # Of Laps
Johnny Rutherford	1	10	10
Gordon Johncock	11	42	32
Johnny Rutherford	43	60	18
Bobby Unser	61	61	1
Tom Sneva	62	68	7
Lee Kunzman	69	80	12
Johnny Rutherford	81	82	2

=== Points standings after this race ===
Note: Only top ten are listed

Rank	Driver	Points	Diff	Pos Change
1	Johnny Rutherford	460		+2
2	Gordon Johncock	450	-10	-1
3	Rick Mears	365	-95	-1
4	Al Unser	280	-180	=0
5	Lee Kunzman	260	-200	+4
6	Bobby Unser	225	-235	-1
7	Tom Sneva	181	-279	+13
8	Tom Bagley	138	-322	=0
9	Mike Mosley	125	-335	-3
10	Wally Dallenbach	115	-345	-3

== Race 2 ==
=== Summary ===
Johnny Rutherford won the pole for the second straight race, with Lee Kunzman, Tom Sneva, Gordon Johncock, and Rick Mears rounding out the top five. The race was dominated by Rutherford, who led 61 of the 82 laps, being only challenged by Bobby Unser and Salt Walther, who led 13 laps thanks to pit shuffling. Rick Mears placed second, Al Unser, who ran out of fuel on the last lap claimed third, Bobby Unser fourth and Tom Sneva fifth. This was the last race victory for McLaren in IndyCar until the 2021 XPEL 375 at Texas Motor Speedway when Pato O'Ward took the win.

=== Results ===
Pos	St	No	Driver	Team	Laps	Time/Retired	Led	Pts
1	1	4	(United States) Johnny Rutherford	Team McLaren	82	45:40.000	61	250
2	5	9	(United States) Rick Mears	Team Penske	82	-	1	200
3	6	2	(United States) Al Unser	Chaparral Cars	82	-	0	175
4	7	12	(United States) Bobby Unser	Team Penske	82	-	7	150
5	3	1	(United States) Tom Sneva	Jerry O'Connell Racing	81	+ 1 Lap	0	125
6	14	11	(United States) Tom Bagley	Longhorn Racing	81	+ 1 Laps	0	100
7	8	25	(United States) Danny Ongais	Interscope Racing	81	+ 1 Lap	0	75
8	11	40	(United States) Wally Dallenbach	Patrick Racing	80	+ 2 Laps	0	63
9	4	20	(United States) Gordon Johncock	Patrick Racing	80	+ 2 Laps	0	50
10	10	77	(United States) Salt Walther	Walmotor	79	+ 3 Laps	13	38
11	9	10	(United States) Pancho Carter	Morales Motorsports	78	+ 4 Laps	0	25
12	12	34	(Australia) Vern Schuppan	Wysard Racing	74	Out of Fuel	0	13
13	13	69	(United States) Joe Saldana	Hoffman Racing	72	+ 10 Laps	0	5
14	18	35	(United States) Larry Rice	S&M Electric	62	+ 20 Laps	0	5
15	15	41	(United States) Bill Alsup	WASP Racing	52	Over-Heating	0	5
16	17	19	(United States) Spike Gehlhausen	Gehlhausen Racing	13	Oil Leak	0	5
17	16	36	(United States) Mike Mosley	All American Racers	3	Engine	0	5
18	2	21	(United States) Lee Kunzman	Conqueste Racing Team	3	Gearbox	0	5

=== Lap Leader Breakdown ===
Leader	From Lap	To Lap	# Of Laps
Johnny Rutherford	1	7	7
Bobby Unser	8	14	7
Johnny Rutherford	15	25	11
Salt Walther	26	38	13
Johnny Rutherford	39	68	30
Rick Mears	69	69	1
Johnny Rutherford	70	82	13

=== Points standings after this race ===
Note: Only top ten are listed

Rank	Driver	Points	Diff	Pos Change
1	Johnny Rutherford	710		=0
2	Rick Mears	565	-145	+1
3	Gordon Johncock	500	-210	-1
4	Al Unser	455	-255	=0
5	Bobby Unser	375	-335	+1
6	Tom Sneva	306	-404	+1
7	Lee Kunzman	265	-445	-2
8	Tom Bagley	213	-497	=0
9	Wally Dallenbach	178	-532	+1
10	Mike Mosley	130	-580	-1

Previous race: 1979 Arizona Republic / Jimmy Bryan 150	SCCA/CART Indy Car Series; 1979 season	Next race: 1979 Indianapolis 500
Previous race: Not Held -	Gould Twin Dixie 125	Next race: 1979 Rich's Atlanta Classic; Same Season
