= Todd Gibson =

American racing driver (1936–2020)

Todd Gibson (December 23, 1936 – December 1, 2020) was an American racing driver from Morral, Ohio, and Richwood, Ohio.

A champion short-track racer in Supermodified racing, Gibson made his USAC Championship Car debut in 1969 at the Milwaukee Mile. He competed in one other race that year and failed to qualify for two more. He was away from Championship Cars until 1976 when he returned to compete in eight races, mostly on the large speedways and finished 23rd in the national championship. In 1977, Gibson attempted to qualify for ten races and qualified for seven, the Indianapolis 500 being one of the races where he failed to make the field. Gibson registered his best Champ Car finish that year with a fourth-place finish at Mosport, his only road course start, backed up by sixth-place finishes at Texas and Trenton. He finished a career-best 18th in the 1977 USAC Championship. In 1978, he made four starts on intermediate ovals with little success in his own Eagle-Offy. Gibson sided with USAC in the USAC-CART split of 1979 and competed in the first two races of the season at Ontario and Texas, but crashed in practice for the Indy 500, after which he retired from Champ Car competition. He returned to Supermodified for select races, concluding his career at the 1988 Oswego 200.

Gibson's sons were also successful in racing. Gene Lee raced Supermodifies, Jeff, and Terry racing 305 Sprint Cars and Supermodifies, as well as son Larry who competed in the Automobile Racing Club of America's Midget Series, while his grandson Zachary raced in the ARCA Re/Max Series in 2009.
