= Bill Vukovich II =

American racing driver (1944–2023)

- Born: William John Vukovich Jr. March 29, 1944 Riverside, California, U.S.
- Died: August 20, 2023 (aged 79) Fresno, California, U.S.

Champ Car career
- 161 races run over 18 years
- Years active: 1965, 1967–1983
- Best finish: 2nd – 1972, 1979
- First race: 1965 Bobby Ball Memorial (Phoenix)
- Last race: 1983 Ted Horn 100 (DuQuoin)
- First win: 1973 Michigan Twin 125s #1 (Michigan)
Wins	Podiums	Poles
1	24	2

William John Vukovich Jr. (March 29, 1944 – August 20, 2023) was an American driver in the championship car division of USAC and the CART series.

== Career ==
Vukovich was named the 1968 Indianapolis 500 Rookie of the Year, a result of his seventh-place finish. Vukovich raced in the 1965–1982 seasons, with 158 combined career starts, including the Indianapolis 500 in 1968–1977, 1979–1980. He finished in the top-ten 85 times, with one victory in 1973 at Michigan. His best finish at the Indianapolis 500 came in 1973, where he finished second in a rain-shortened, tragedy-marred event.

Vukovich also had 23 National midget car victories in his career, and drove for part of his career in J. C. Agajanian's midget car.

== Personal life and death ==
Vukovich was the son of two-time Indianapolis 500 winner Bill Vukovich and the father of Billy Vukovich III, both of whom were killed in racing accidents. Vukovich and his wife, Joyce, were married for 60 years. Vukovich died on August 20, 2023, at the age of 79.

== Award ==
- Vukovich was inducted in the National Midget Auto Racing Hall of Fame in 1998.

== Complete USAC Championship Car results ==
Year	1	2	3	4	5	6	7	8	9	10	11	12	13	14	15	16	17	18	19	20	21	22	23	24	25	26	27	28	Pos	Points
1965	PHX	TRE	INDY	MIL	LAN	PPR	TRE	IRP	ATL	LAN	MIL	ISF	MIL	DSF	INF	TRE	SAC	PHX; 9											37th	80
1967	PHX	TRE	INDY	MIL	LAN	PIP	MOS	MOS	IRP	LAN; 23	MTR; 23	MTR; 11	SPR; 6	MIL; 16	DUQ; 5	ISF; 4	TRE; 13	SAC; 17	HAN; 26	PHX; DNQ	RIV; 7								15th	470
1968	HAN; 26	LVG; 6	PHX; 19	TRE; 5	INDY; 7	MIL; 13	MOS; 9	MOS; 7	LAN; 14	PIP	CDR; 9	NAZ; 3	IRP; 13	IRP; 6	LAN; 6	LAN; 4	MTR	MTR	SPR; 4	MIL; 7	DUQ; 3	ISF; 5	TRE; 6	SAC; 16	MCH; 19	HAN; 6	PHX; 4	RIV; 7	5th	2,410
1969	PHX; 4	HAN; 8	INDY; 32	MIL; 17	LAN; 4	PIP	CDR; 19	NAZ; 13	TRE; 6	IRP; 22	IRP	MIL; 5	SPR; 3	DOV	DUQ; 4	ISF; 14	BRN; DNQ	BRN	TRE; 24	SAC; 13	KEN; 9	KEN; 17	PHX; 6	RIV; 27					8th	1,280
1970	PHX; DNS	SON; 20	TRE; DNP	INDY; 23	MIL; 13	LAN; 12	CDR	MCH	IRP	SPR; DNP	MIL	ONT; DNQ	DUQ	ISF	SED	TRE	SAC; 3	PHX; 10											32nd	200
1971	RAF	RAF	PHX	TRE; 25	INDY; 5	MIL; 3	POC; 5	MCH; 2	MIL; 14	ONT; 10	TRE; 4	PHX; 3																	3rd	2.250
1972	PHX; 20	TRE; 18	INDY; 28	MIL; 4	MCH; 11	POC; 4	MIL; 2	ONT; 3	TRE; 4	PHX; 15																			2nd	2.200
1973	TWS; 15	TRE; 3	TRE; 2	INDY; 2	MIL; 22	POC; 24	MCH; 3	MIL; 3	ONT; 12	ONT	ONT; 24	MCH; 1	MCH; 15	TRE; 6	TWS; 20	PHX; 3													4th	2.440
1974	ONT; 10	ONT	ONT; 21	PHX; 8	TRE; 3	INDY; 3	MIL; 3	POC; 8	MCH; 5	MIL; 10	MCH; 19	TRE; 18	TRE	PHX; 6															6th	1,925
1975	ONT	ONT; 4	ONT; 23	PHX; 4	TRE	INDY; 6	MIL; 7	POC; 3	MCH; 3	MIL; 8	MCH; 11	TRE	PHX; 4																5th	2.080
1976	PHX; DNQ	TRE; 22	INDY; 31	MIL; 6	POC; 26	MCH	TWS; 6	TRE; 8	MIL; 15	ONT; 24	MCH	TWS; 5	PHX; 6																14th	660
1977	ONT; 20	PHX; 19	TWS	TRE; 13	INDY; 17	MIL	POC; 9	MOS; 12	MCH; 14	TWS	MIL	ONT; 31	MCH	PHX															27th	220
1978	PHX	ONT	TWS	TRE	INDY; DNQ	MOS	MIL	POC; 28	MCH	ATL	TWS	MIL	ONT; 26	MCH	TRE	SIL	BRH	PHX											40th	20
1979	ONT; 3	TWS; 6	INDY; 8	MIL; 2	POC; 6	TWS; 6	MIL; 3																						2nd	1,770
1980	ONT	INDY; 12	MIL; 21	POC; 28	MOH																								29th	65
1981-82	INDY; DNQ	POC; 6	ILL; 17	DUQ	ISF; 6	INDY; DNQ																							13th	568
1982-83	SPR	DUQ	NAZ	INDY; DNQ																									-	0
1983-84	DUQ; 12	INDY; DNP																											19th	20

== Complete PPG Indy Car Series results ==
Year	Team	1	2	3	4	5	6	7	8	9	10	11	12	13	14	15	16	Pos.	Pts	Ref
1979	Leader Card Racing	PHX	ATL	ATL	INDY; 8	TRE	TRE	MCH	MCH	WGL	TRE	ONT	MCH	ATL	PHX			-	0	
1980	Leader Card Racing	ONT	INDY; 12	MIL; 21	POC; 28	MOH	MCH	WGL	MIL; 19	ONT; 34	MCH; 25	MEX	PHX; 12					37th	96	
1981	Rattlesnake Racing	PHX	MIL	ATL	ATL	MCH; 15	RIV; DNQ	MIL	MCH; 14	WGL	MEX; 27	PHX						33rd	6	
1982		PHX	ATL	MIL; 11	CLE	MCH	MIL	POC; 29	RIV	ROA	MCH	PHX						41st	2	
1983		ATL	INDY; DNQ	MIL	CLE	MCH	ROA	POC	RIV	MOH	MCH	CPL	LAG	PHX				-	0	
1984		LBH	PHX	INDY; DNQ	MIL	POR	MEA	CLE	MCH	ROA	POC	MOH	SAN	MCH	PHX	LAG	CPL	-	0	

== Indianapolis 500 results ==
Year	Chassis	Engine	Start	Finish
1968	Shrike	Offy	23rd	7th
1969	Laycock	Offy	26th	32nd
1970	Brabham	Offy	30th	23rd
1971	Brabham	Offy	11th	5th
1972	Eagle	Offy	18th	28th
1973	Eagle	Offy	16th	2nd
1974	Eagle	Offy	16th	3rd
1975	Eagle	Offy	8th	6th
1976	Eagle	Offy	9th	31st
1977	Coyote	Foyt	23rd	17th
1978	Eagle	Offy	Failed to Qualify	
1979	Watson	Offy	34th	8th
1980	Watson	Offy	30th	12th
1981	Watson	Offy	Failed to Qualify	
1982	Lightning	Cosworth	Failed to Qualify	
1983	Eagle	Chevrolet	Failed to Qualify	

Sporting positions
Preceded by Denis Hulme	Indianapolis 500; Rookie of the Year; 1968	Succeeded by Mark Donohue
