= Tom Frantz =

American racing driver (1943–2019)

Tom Frantz (July 9, 1943 - September 22, 2019) was an American racing driver from Denver, Colorado. He made his USAC Championship Car debut in 1975 and made six starts with two 11th-place finish and competitive drives in every event. However, the following year was less successful as he only made two starts before blowing his engine before qualifying at Milwaukee, failing to qualify in Texas, and crashing in practice at Phoenix in his other three attempts to race that year. In 1977, he attempted to qualify for his first Indianapolis 500 but failed to qualify. In 1979, the rival CART Champ Car series was founded and Frantz ran a nearly full season in the series, finishing 20th in points and registering a career-best finish of ninth at Trenton Speedway in August. However, he again failed to qualify for the Indy 500, an indignity that continued in 1980. He attempted five races in 1982, but failed to qualify for four of them including the Indy 500, only barely making the large field at the Michigan International Speedway and being knocked out after 20 laps by a mechanical vibration.
