= Mike Mosley =

American racing driver

- Mosley's promotional headshot for the 1979 CART season
- Nationality: (United States) American
- Born: Michael Dean Mosley; December 13, 1946 Oklahoma City, Oklahoma, U.S.
- Died: March 3, 1984 (aged 37) Aguanga, California, U.S.

Champ Car career
- 166 races run over 17 years
- Years active: 1967–1983
- Best finish: 4th – 1970
- First race: 1967 Trenton 200 (Trenton)
- Last race: 1983 Miller High Life 150 (Phoenix)
- First win: 1971 Trenton 200 (Trenton)
- Last win: 1981 Gould Rex Mays Classic (Milwaukee)
Wins	Podiums	Poles
5	20	0

Mike Mosley (December 13, 1946 in Oklahoma City, Oklahoma – March 3, 1984 in Aguanga, California) was an American race car driver in the USAC and CART Championship Car series. He raced in 17 consecutive seasons from 1967 through 1983, with 166 combined career starts, including every Indianapolis 500 in that span except 1967 and 1982. He finished in the top-ten 80 times and had five career victories.

== Career ==
Mosley was known for a "charger" driving style and for his smooth driving technique. Many of his peers felt Mosley never had the opportunity to showcase his talent due to second-rate equipment. Longtime motorsports writer Robin Miller quoted Gary Bettenhausen, a close friend and contemporary of Mosley, as saying: "If Mike had been driving a McLaren (Indianapolis car) in the early 1970s, we would all have been racing for second place."

Mosley was known for having a perceived "jinx" at Indianapolis. He qualified near the front several times, including second in 1981 and 1983, and was often a pre-race favorite. However, in 15 starts, he finished the 500 miles only once—a third-place result in 1979. On his first visit to Indianapolis in 1967, he lied about his age (20 at the time) to gain entry; after two crashes in practice, he told the car owner he was not yet ready to tackle Indy's 2 1/2-mile oval. The next year, he returned and qualified for the race.

Mosley was particularly effective at the flat Milwaukee Mile paved oval, where he used an unusual driving line and recorded three victories. In the 1981 race there, added as a promoter's option, he came from the back of the field to win the race. It was the last win for a normally-aspirated engine in the CART/Champ Car era and also the last win in open wheel racing for a Gurney Eagle.

Mosley died in a highway accident in Aguanga, California. He lost control of the truck he was driving, which rolled down an embankment and caught fire. His teenaged son, Michael, was also riding in the van but was uninjured.

== Racing results ==
=== Indianapolis 500 results ===
Year	Car	Start	Qual	Rank	Finish	Laps	Led	Retired
1968	90	27	162.449	26	8	197	0	Flagged
1969	90	22	166.113	22	13	162	0	Piston
1970	9	12	166.651	17	21	96	0	Radiator
1971	4	19	169.579	29	13	159	0	Crash T4
1972	98	16	189.145	5	26	56	3	Crash T4
1973	98	21	189.753	28	10	120	0	Rod Bolt
1974	98	6	185.319	7	29	6	0	Blown Engine
1975	12	5	187.833	6	26	94	0	Engine
1976	12	11	187.588	4	15	98	0	Flagged
1977	5	9	190.064	12	19	91	0	Timing Gear
1978	78	25	188.719	26	17	146	0	Turbocharger
1979	36	12	186.278	16	3	200	0	Running
1980	48	26	183.449	25	32	5	0	Gasket
1981	48	2	197.141	4	33	16	0	Radiator
1983	18	2	205.372	2	13	169	1	Crash T1
**Totals**						1615	4	

Starts	15
Poles	0
Front Row	2
Wins	0
Top 5	1
Top 10	3
Retired	12

=== USAC Champ Car results ===
(key) (Races in bold indicate pole position)

Year	Team	Chassis	Engine	1	2	3	4	5	6	7	8	9	10	11	12	13	14	15	16	17	18	19	20	21	22	23	24	25	26	27	28	Rank	Points
1967	Leader Card Racers	?	?	PHX; DNQ	TRE; DNQ	INDY; DNQ	MIL	LAN	PIP	MOS	MOS	IRP	LAN	MTR	MTR	SPR																41st	120
1967	Walt Michner	Gerhardt	Ford														MIL; DNQ	DUQ	ISF	TRE; 7	SAC	HAN; 13	PHX	RIV								41st	120
1968	Bob Wilke	Watson	Offenhauser	HAN	LVG	PHX	TRE	INDY; 8	MIL; 19			LAN; 4	PIP					LAN	LAN; 20	MTR	MTR	SPR	MIL; 17	DUQ	ISF	TRE	SAC	MCH; 3	HAN; 13	PHX; 9		20th	860
1968	Bob Wilke	Watson	Ford							MOS; 16	MOS; 9			CDR; 14	NAZ	IRP; 9	IRP														RIV; 14	20th	860
1969	Bob Wilke	Watson	Offenhauser	PHX; 6	HAN; 12	INDY; 13	MIL; 6	LAN; 16	PIP		NAZ	TRE; 3	IRP; 19	IRP; DNQ	MIL; 7	SPR; 17	DOV; 4	DUQ; 18	ISF; 17	BRN; 9	BRN; 5	TRE; 23	SAC; 17	KEN; 6	KEN; 9	PHX; 17	RIV; 11					9th	1220
1969	Bob Wilke	Watson	Chevrolet							CDR; 14																						9th	1220
1970	Andy Granatelli	Watson	Offenhauser													DUQ; 18																4th	1900
1970	Ralph Wilke	Eagle	Offenhauser												ONT; 14																	4th	1900
1970	Ralph Wilke	Watson	Offenhauser	PHX; 5	SON; 7	TRE; 5	INDY; 21	MIL; 7	LAN; 3	CDR; 15	MCH; 4		SPR; 10	MIL; 5			ISF; 5	SED; 4	TRE; 3	SAC; 8	PHX; 20											4th	1900
1970	Ralph Wilke	Watson	Chevrolet									IRP; 14																				4th	1900
1971	Ralph Wilke	Eagle	Ford					INDY; 13	MIL	POC	MCH	MIL	ONT	TRE																		17th	655
1971	Ralph Wilke	Watson	Ford	RAF; 3	RAF; 23	PHX; 10	TRE; 1																									17th	655
1971	Ralph Wilke	Watson	Offenhauser												PHX; 19																	17th	655
1972	Ralph Wilke	Eagle	Offenhauser	PHX; 3	TRE; 13	INDY; 26	MIL	MCH	POC	MIL	ONT; 5	TRE; 5	PHX; 2																			10th	1250
1973	Ralph Wilke	Eagle	Offenhauser	TWS; 3	TRE; 9	TRE; 8	INDY; 10	MIL; 24	POC; 4	MCH; 10	MIL; 2	ONT	ONT; 5	ONT; 3	MCH; 18	MCH	TRE; 14	TWS; 23	PHX; 20													6th	2345
1974	Ralph Wilke	Eagle	Offenhauser	ONT; 6	ONT	ONT; 7	PHX; 1	TRE; 7	INDY; 29	MIL; 10	POC; 21	MCH; 8	MIL; 18	MCH; 15	TRE; 17	TRE	PHX															13th	945
1975	Jerry O'Connell	Eagle	Offenhauser	ONT; 10	ONT	ONT; 11	PHX; 9	TRE; 3	INDY; 26	MIL; 5	POC; 31	MCH; 13	MIL; 1	MCH	TRE	PHX																12th	1020
1976	Jerry O'Connell	Eagle	Offenhauser	PHX; 5	TRE; 5	INDY; 15	MIL; 1	POC; 2	MCH; 22	TWS; 4	TRE; 5	MIL; 5	ONT; 15	MCH; 7	TWS; 22	PHX; DNQ																5th	2120
1977	Jerry O'Connell	Eagle	Offenhauser	ONT; 16	PHX; 6	TWS; 5	TRE; 3																									10th	1030
1977	Jerry O'Connell	Lightning	Offenhauser					INDY; 19	MIL; 4	POC; 8	MOS	MCH; DNQ	TWS	MIL	ONT; 16	MCH; 18	PHX; DNQ															10th	1030
1978	Alex Morales Motorsports	Lightning	Offenhauser	PHX	ONT	TWS	TRE	INDY; 17	MOS; DNQ	MIL; 14	POC; 7	MCH; DNQ	ATL	TWS; 13	MIL; DNQ	ONT; 16	MCH	TRE; 8	SIL	BRH	PHX; 10											24th	483
1979	All American Racers	Eagle	Cosworth	ONT	TWS	INDY; 3	MIL	POC	TWS	MIL																						NC	0
1980	All American Racers	Eagle	Cosworth	ONT; 19																												41st	28
1980	All American Racers	Eagle	Chevrolet		INDY; 32	MIL	POC; 23	MOH																								41st	28
1981-82	All American Racers	Eagle	Chevrolet	INDY; 33	POC	SPR	DUQ	ISF	INDY; DNQ																							49th	5
1982-83	Kraco Enterprises	March	Cosworth	SPR	DUQ	NAZ	INDY; 13																									21st	25

=== CART IndyCar Series Results ===
(key)

Year	Team	Chassis	Engine	1	2	3	4	5	6	7	8	9	10	11	12	13	14	Rank	Points	Ref
1979	All American Racers	Eagle	Cosworth	PHX; 6	ATL; 17	ATL; 17	INDY; 3	TRE; 13	TRE	MCH; 2	MCH; 20	WGL; 12	TRE; 14	ONT; 34	MCH	ATL; 14	PHX; 10	10th	1121	
1980	All American Racers	Eagle	Chevrolet	ONT; 19	INDY; 32	MIL	POC; 23	MOH	MCH	WGL		ONT; 17	MCH	MEX	PHX			41st	56	
1980	Mach I Racing	Penske	Cosworth								MIL; 20							41st	56	
1981	All American Racers	Eagle	Chevrolet	PHX	MIL; 1	ATL	ATL	MCH; 18	RIV	MIL	MCH; 26	WGL		PHX; 24				19th	32	
1981	Brayton Racing	Penske	Cosworth										MEX; 7					19th	32	
1982	Kraco Enterprises	March	Cosworth	PHX	ATL	MIL	CLE	MCH; 8	MIL; 7	POC; 16	RIV	ROA	MCH; 7	PHX; 12				19th	37	
1983	Kraco Enterprises	March	Cosworth	ATL; 13	INDY; 13	MIL; 5	CLE; 4	MCH; 17	ROA; 25	POC; 4	RIV; 24	MOH	MCH; 11	CPL	LAG	PHX; 24		14th	36	

=== International Race of Champions results ===
(key) (Bold – Pole position. * – Most laps led.)

International Race of Champions results
Year	Make	Q1	Q2	Q3	1	2	Pos.	Pts	Ref
1979-1980	Chevy	MCH	MCH; 8	RIV	RIV	ATL	NC	—	
