= Parnelli VPJ6 =

Parnelli VPJ-6 Parnelli VPJ-6B Parnelli VPJ-6C
- Category: USAC IndyCar
- Constructor: Vel's Parnelli Jones Racing
- Designer(s): John Barnard
- Predecessor: Parnelli VPJ2

Technical specifications
- Chassis: Aluminum Monocoque
- Suspension: Inboard springs and Fox shocks front and rear, operated by top rocker arm with front and lower rear A arms of streamline tubing
- Engine: Cosworth DFX 2,650 cc (161.7 cu in) V8 80° Mid-engined, longitudinally mounted
- Transmission: Manual (Weismann / Barnard 4 speed Manual Transverse Transaxle)
- Weight: 1,550 lb (703.1 kg)
- Fuel: Methanol
- Tyres: Firestone Speedway Specials - Rear 27.0x14.5-15 - Front 25.5x10.0-15

Competition history
- Notable drivers: Danny Ongais; Al Unser; George Snider; Bill Whittington; Lee Kunzman; A. J. Foyt

The Parnelli VPJ6 is an open-wheel race car, designed by British designer John Barnard for Vel's Parnelli Jones Racing, to compete in U.S.A.C. Championship Car, between 1975 and 1980, as well as in CART, between 1979 and 1980. It was driven by Danny Ongais, Al Unser, George Snider, Bill Whittington, Lee Kunzman, and A. J. Foyt. It notably gave Foyt his last IndyCar championship, in 1979. It was powered by the powerful and successful DFV-derived DFX.
