= Jerry O'Connell Racing =

American auto racing team

Jerry O'Connell Racing is an American auto racing team owned by Jerry O'Connell. The team debuted in 1970 as a Sugaripe Prune entry in 1970 Indianapolis 500 with driver Bill Vukovich, Jr. The team competed in the USAC & CART ranks until the team shut down after the seventh race of 1981 CART season - Tony Bettenhausen 200 at Milwaukee Mile.

== IndyCar wins ==
#	Season	Date	Sanction	Track / Race	No.	Winning driver	Chassis	Engine	Tire	Grid	Laps Led
1	1973	September 16	USAC	Michigan Speedway Twin 125s #1 (O)	2	(United States) Bill Vukovich, Jr.	Eagle 72	Offenhauser L4t 159 ci	Goodyear	14	3
2	1975	August 17	USAC	Milwaukee Mile (O)	12	(United States) Mike Mosley	Eagle 74	Offenhauser L4t 159 ci	Goodyear	6	132
3	1976	June 13	USAC	Milwaukee Mile (O)	12	(United States) Mike Mosley (2)	Eagle 74	Offenhauser L4t 159 ci	Goodyear	2	150
4	1980	November 8	CART	Phoenix International Raceway (O)	9	(United States) Tom Sneva	Phoenix 80	Cosworth DFX V8t	Goodyear	6	95
