= Phil Threshie =

American racing driver

Phil Threshie (born April 12, 1953 in Alamo, California) is an American former auto racing driver in the USAC and CART Championship Car series. He raced in the 1977-1981 seasons, with 15 combined career starts, including the 1978 and 1979 Indianapolis 500 races. He finished in the top-ten on one occasion, recording an eighth place at Texas World Speedway in 1979.

== Indianapolis 500 results ==
Year	Chassis	Engine	Start	Finish
1978	Lightning	Offy	29th	30th
1979	King	Chevrolet	29th	17th
1980	IAM	Donovan	Failed to Qualify	
1981	McLaren	Cosworth	Failed to Qualify	
