= 1985 Pocono 500 =

(United States) 1985 Pocono 500
Race details
- 9th round of the 1985 CART PPG Indy Car World Series season
- Date: August 18, 1985
- Official name: 1985 Domino's Pizza 500
- Location: Long Pond, Pennsylvania
- Course: Permanent racing facility 2.5 mi / 4.023 km
- Distance: 200 laps 500 mi / 804.672 km
- Weather: Temperatures up to 73 °F (23 °C); wind speeds up to 12 miles per hour (19 km/h)

Pole position
- Driver: (United States) Rick Mears (Team Penske)
- Time: 203.532 mph

Podium
- First: (United States) Rick Mears (Team Penske)
- Second: (United States) Al Unser Jr. (Doug Shierson Racing)
- Third: (United States) Al Unser (Team Penske)

The 1985 Pocono 500, the 15th running of the event, was held at the Pocono Raceway in Long Pond, Pennsylvania, on Sunday, August 18, 1985. Branded as the 1985 Domino's Pizza 500 for sponsorship reasons, the race was won by Rick Mears, his first victory since suffering severe leg and feet injuries in a September 1984 crash.

== Background ==
In September 1984, Rick Mears suffered severe injuries to his feet in a crash at Sanair Super Speedway. Doctors in Canada initially wanted to amputate both feet but were convinced to transfer Mears to Indianapolis for reconstructive surgery. Mears returned to racing at the 1985 Indianapolis 500 where he finished 21st. He ran only races at ovals while continuing rehab for his injuries. At the Michigan 500 three weeks before Pocono, Mears won his first pole since returning, but fell out of the race after seven laps with transmission issues.

In the Michigan 500, Mario Andretti crashed and suffered a broken collar bone and hairline fracture of the right hip socket. He was forced to sit out the CART race at Road America on August 4, but made his return at Pocono.

During the CART race at Road America, Al Unser Jr. broke his right ankle when he crashed while leading on lap 36. Unser raced at Pocono but needed to be carried into his car by his crew chief. Tom Gloy was a standby driver if Unser needed someone else to drive.

On Tuesday, August 6, Danny Sullivan suffered minor injuries in a testing session at Pocono. In turn one, Sullivan spun 360 degrees and hit the wall, destroying the car. The car planned to be raced by his Team Penske teammate, Rick Mears, in the Pocono 500, but a backup was needed. Sullivan suffered "banged-up ankles, a sprained shoulder, and a torn back muscle."

Danny Sullivan won the 1985 Indianapolis 500 in May. Emerson Fittipaldi won the Michigan 500 in early August to score his first Indy car victory. CART entered the Pocono 500 with Fittipaldi, Mario Andretti, and Al Unser in a three-way tie for the points lead.

== Practice and Time Trials ==
=== Practice - Thursday, August 15 ===
On Thursday, August 15, Bobby Rahal was fastest in practice at 200.334 mph. Rick Mears was second at 198.702 mph. A. J. Foyt was a surprising third at 198.627 mph.

=== Practice - Friday, August 16 ===
Friday's qualifying session was canceled because of rain. A 90-minute practice session was held when the track dried. Bobby Rahal was fastest at 201.450 mph. Mario Andretti was second at 201.374 mph. Rick Mears was third at 201.266 mph. Sammy Swindell, attempting to make his second Indy car start, crashed in turn three minutes before practice ended. He went to a backup car.

=== Qualifying - Saturday, August 17 ===
In Saturday's qualifying session, Rick Mears won the pole and broke the track record with a speed of 203.532 mph. Danny Sullivan was second at 202.125 mph. Bobby Rahal qualified third and completed the front row with a speed of 201.930 mph. Phil Krueger was the slowest qualifier at 155.154 mph. Steve Chassey and Tom Bigelow failed to post qualifying speeds but were allowed to start the race.

== Andretti and Cogan Helicopter Crash ==
On race morning, teammates Michael Andretti and Kevin Cogan were in a helicopter crash on the way to the track. They were staying at a nearby lake house owned by Mario Andretti. As the helicopter was taking off, it struck an electrical wire 50 feet in the air. The rear rotor hit first, then the main rotor, and the helicopter went nose first towards the ground. On the way down, it hit a tree which cushioned the impact. "Thank God for the tree," Andretti said, "I'm sure it kept it from exploding."

There were seven passengers on board, with no one sustaining serious injuries. A second helicopter carrying Mario Andretti and Paul Newman was also on the scene and carried the drivers to Pocono. Michael Andretti went to the track's infield hospital for treatment for soreness behind the left shoulder blade. Both Andretti and Cogan started the race.

== Race ==
The CEO of Domino's Pizza, Tom Monaghan was Grand marshal for the race and gave the command to start engines.

From his starting spot in the middle of the front row, Danny Sullivan took the lead entering turn one at the start of the race. Then entering turn two, Michael Andretti passed Sullivan for first. Overcoming his morning helicopter crash, Andretti led the first 18 laps.

On lap 19, Michael Andretti entered pit lane. At that exact moment, the right-front wheel fell off his car and continued down pit lane. The wheel struck the wall separating the pits from the race track and no one was injured. Bobby Rahal took over the lead.

With rain threatening, there were several different strategies for teams. As cars went through green flag pit stops, the lead was swapped by Rahal, Danny Sullivan, Al Unser Jr. and Johnny Rutherford.

The race was caution-free for the first 122 laps. The first yellow flag was thrown on lap 123 for a piece of debris in turn one. During the caution period, ESPN television reporters were able to relay messages from Al Unser Jr to his crew who lost radio contact with him earlier in the race.

On lap 133, Johnny Rutherford passed Unser Jr. to re-take the lead of the race. Within two laps, Rutherford built nearly a two-second lead over Unser. On lap 135, Rutherford spun exiting turn one and hit the outside wall. After being examined by doctors at the track, Rutherford was unhurt except for bruises and he had no memory of the accident. "I knew I was leading, then the lights went out. I don't remember the accident at all."

Michael Andretti fell out of the race on lap 151 when his engine failed and he stopped in turn two. Mears pitted under caution, giving the lead back to Al Unser. Three laps after the restart, a piece of debris fell off Pancho Carter's car and brought out another caution. Unser pitted, which gave the lead back to Mears.

Mears made his final pit stop on lap 189 for fuel only. Rahal entered pit road on lap 193 for fuel. While Rahal was refueling, a caution was thrown when a piece of debris from a car's sidepod landed on the track in turn one. Al Unser Sr. assumed the lead and planned to stay out on track. With one lap until the restart, Unser pitted from the lead. Because Unser pitted late, several lapped cars were between the pace car and new leader, Mears. Mears navigated the traffic and won by 2.18 seconds over Al Unser Jr. Unser Sr. finished third. Bobby Rahal pitted with four laps to go due to a flat tire and finished fourth.

It was Mears' first win since his September 1984 crash that resulted in massive injuries to his feet. Al Unser scored the most points in the Indy car Triple Crown and was awarded a $10,000 prize from Domino's.

== Box score ==
Finish	Grid	No	Name	Entrant	Chassis	Engine	Laps	Time/Status	Led	Points
1	1	5	(United States) Rick Mears	Penske Racing	March 85C	Cosworth	200	3:17:47.440	36	21
2	9	30	(United States) Al Unser Jr.	Doug Shierson Racing	Lola T900	Cosworth	200	+2.180	58	17
3	6	11	(United States) Al Unser	Penske Racing	March 85C	Cosworth	200	Running	23	14
4	3	3	(United States) Bobby Rahal	Truesports	March 85C	Cosworth	200	Running	55	12
5	2	4	(United States) Danny Sullivan	Penske Racing	March 85C	Cosworth	199	+1 Lap	3	10
6	10	1	(United States) Mario Andretti	Newman/Haas Racing	Lola T900	Cosworth	198	+2 Laps	1	8
7	7	40	(Brazil) Emerson Fittipaldi	Patrick Racing	March 85C	Cosworth	197	+3 Laps	0	6
8	19	2	(United States) Tom Sneva	Gurney-Curb Racing	Eagle 85	Cosworth	195	+5 Laps	0	5
9	22	36	(Australia) Dennis Firestone	BC Pace Racing	Lola T900	Cosworth	193	+7 Laps	0	4
10	21	22	(United States) Dick Simon	Dick Simon Racing	March 85C	Cosworth	191	Engine	0	3
11	26	56	(United States) Steve Chassey	Gohr Racing	March 85C	Chevrolet	183	+17 Laps	0	2
12	12	6	(United States) Pancho Carter	Galles Racing	March 85C	Cosworth	160	Side pod	0	1
13	4	99	(United States) Michael Andretti	Kraco Racing	March 85C	Cosworth	150	Fire	18	0
14	5	21	(United States) Johnny Rutherford	Alex Morales Motorsports	March 85C	Cosworth	134	Crash	6	0
15	25	42	(United States) Phil Krueger	Mergard Racing	March 84C	Cosworth	125	Bodywork	0	0
16	14	37	(United States) Scott Brayton	Brayton Racing	March 85C	Cosworth	120	CV joint	0	0
17	8	18	(United States) Kevin Cogan	Kraco Racing	March 85C	Cosworth	116	Wheel bearing	0	0
18	13	9	(Colombia) Roberto Guerrero	Bignotti-Cotter Racing	March 85C	Cosworth	113	Engine	0	0
19	11	7	(Australia) Geoff Brabham	Galles Racing	March 85C	Cosworth	103	Wheel bearing	0	0
20	16	98	(United States) Ed Pimm	Gurney-Curb Racing	Eagle 85	Cosworth	101	Engine	0	0
21	20	33	(United States) Howdy Holmes	Forsythe Racing	Lola T900	Cosworth	98	Wheel bearing	0	0
22	15	25	(United States) Danny Ongais	Interscope Racing	March 85C	Cosworth	65	Wheel bearing	0	0
23	27	24	(United States) Tom Bigelow	Leader Card Racers	March 85C	Cosworth	64	Suspension	0	0
24	17	14	(United States) A. J. Foyt	A. J. Foyt Enterprises	March 85C	Cosworth	53	Vibration	0	0
25	23	20	(United States) Sammy Swindell	Patrick Racing	March 85C	Cosworth	39	Engine	0	0
26	18	55	(Mexico) Josele Garza	Machinists Union Racing	March 85C	Cosworth	31	Clutch	0	0
27	24	19	(United States) Dale Coyne	Dale Coyne Racing	Lola T800	Chevrolet	5	Engine	0	0

=== Race statistics ===
Lap Leaders
Laps	Leader
1–18	Michael Andretti
19–26	Bobby Rahal
27–28	Al Unser Jr.
29–30	Danny Sullivan
31	Mario Andretti
32–36	Bobby Rahal
37–44	Al Unser
45–53	Bobby Rahal
54–58	Al Unser Jr.
59	Johnny Rutherford
60–63	Al Unser Jr.
64	Danny Sullivan
65–82	Bobby Rahal
83–88	Al Unser Jr.
89	Johnny Rutherford
90–117	Al Unser Jr.
118–119	Johnny Rutherford
120–132	Al Unser Jr.
133–134	Johnny Rutherford
135–145	Bobby Rahal
146–151	Rick Mears
152–163	Al Unser
164–188	Rick Mears
189–192	Bobby Rahal
193–195	Al Unser
196–200	Rick Mears

Cautions: 5 for 36 laps
Laps	Reason
124–131	Debris turn 1
135–147	Johnny Rutherford crash turn 2
152–159	Michael Andretti fire turn 2
163–165	Debris
194–197	Debris turn 1

== Broadcasting ==
For the first time, the Pocono 500 was broadcast by ESPN. A three-hour, tape-delayed telecast was shown at 8 p.m., hours after the race was over. Larry Nuber and Gordon Johncock were the lead announcers. Jack Arute and Gary Lee were pit reporters.
