= 1985 Michigan 500 =

Coordinates: 42°03′58.68″N 84°14′29.18″W

(United States) 1985 Michigan 500
Race details
- Race 7 of 15 in the 1985 CART season
- Date: July 28, 1985
- Official name: 1985 Michigan 500
- Location: Michigan International Speedway, Brooklyn, Michigan, United States
- Course: Permanent racing facility 2.000 mi / 3.219 km
- Distance: 250 laps 500.000 mi / 804.672 km
- Weather: Sunny with temperatures up to 85 °F (29 °C); wind speeds reaching up to 10 miles per hour (16 km/h)

Pole position
- Driver: (United States) Bobby Rahal (Truesports)
- Time: 215.202 mph (346.334 km/h)

Podium
- First: (Brazil) Emerson Fittipaldi (Patrick Racing)
- Second: (United States) Al Unser (Team Penske)
- Third: (United States) Tom Sneva (Curb Racing)

The 1985 Michigan 500, the fifth running of the event, was held at the Michigan International Speedway in Brooklyn, Michigan, on Sunday, July 28, 1985. The event was race number 7 of 15 in the 1985 CART PPG Indy Car World Series. The race was won by Emerson Fittipaldi, his first Indy Car victory. The race was delayed for one week over concerns about Goodyear's new radial tires.

== Background ==
As was the case in 1983 and 1984, Domino's Pizza offered a one million dollar bonus to any driver who could win IndyCar's Triple Crown of 500 Mile Races: The Indianapolis 500, Michigan 500, and Pocono 500. Danny Sullivan won the 1985 Indianapolis 500 and entered Michigan still eligible to win the million dollars.

Rick Mears suffered severe feet injuries in a crash in September 1984. Mears was only running oval races in 1985 and the Michigan 500 would mark his third race of the season.

== Practice and Time Trials ==
Practice began on Thursday, July 19. Mario Andretti set the fastest speed at 215.253 mph. Bobby Rahal was second fastest at 213.270 mph. Andretti had two separate spins an hour apart in the session after hitting a bump exiting turn two. A. J. Foyt hit the turn two wall shortly after practice began when a right-rear wheel broke. Foyt had to go to a backup car. Roberto Guerrero spun exiting turn two but didn't hit anything.

In Friday's morning practice session, Bobby Rahal crashed in turn two after hitting the same bump that affected Andretti on Thursday. Rahal's team switched to a backup car.

Time Trials were held on Friday afternoon. After preparing his backup car, Rahal won the pole with a speed of 215.202 mph. The speed was not only a track record, but the fastest speed ever in Indy car competition. Rick Mears was second fastest at 213.720 mph. Joining Rahal and Mears on the front row was Danny Sullivan at 211.758 mph. 27 cars posted qualifying speeds.

== Goodyear Withdrawal ==
Early in Saturday morning's practice session, Roberto Guerrero cut a right-front tire and spun exiting turn two. Guerrero didn't hit anything. Shortly thereafter, Bobby Rahal cut a right-front tire and hit the turn two wall hard. Rahal walked away from the crash with a bruised elbow and headache. His team worked to rebuild the car he crashed on Friday morning. Because his pole-winning car was withdrawn, Rahal would have to start from the rear of the field.

While no definitive evidence could be found, some suspected that the failures might have been related to Goodyear's new radial tires. On Guerrero's car, Goodyear engineers detected a puncture but could not find any evidence of damage on Rahal's tire.

Goodyear PR Director Dave Hederich explained, "There was a razor-clean cut on the shoulder (of Guerrero's tire) that looked like a classic cut caused by debris. But unfortunately, when Rahal crashed, he went into the wall with the right front tire, which mangled it so badly that we were unable to reconstruct what happened."

A four-hour meeting was held to discuss options regarding the race. Out of an abundance of caution, it was decided that the race would be delayed one week and Goodyear would return with the bias-ply tires they used at Michigan in 1984. Goodyear had tires in storage but needed the extra week to produce 600-700 new ones.

The radial tires performed flawlessly during testing and the first two days of practice. Bias-ply tires had blown in the past and were viewed as a part of racing. There were questions over how the race would be handled if a backmarker crashed instead of Rahal. It was suggested that the rough surface of the Michigan track also might have contributed to the two tire failures.

After a laboratory analysis, Goodyear engineers found nothing wrong with the tires that experienced loss of air on Guerrero's and Rahal's car. They also tested 25 other tires used by fast teams and found "nothing out of the ordinary."

In the week that followed, Arie Luyendyk's team withdrew from the race. A. J. Foyt also withdrew to compete instead in NASCAR's Talladega 500, where he finished fifth. Pete Halsmer withdrew from the race to compete in an IMSA event at Portland. He was replaced by Chip Ganassi.

Practice resumed on Friday, July 26. Danny Sullivan posted the fastest speed at 211.846 mph. Driving his repaired primary car, Rahal's fastest speed was 209.400 mph. Spike Gehlhausen hit the wall but his car was able to be repaired before the race.

== Race ==
For the rescheduled race, 70,000 spectators filled the stands. From his position on the middle of row one, Danny Sullivan took the lead from Rick Mears at the drop of the green flag. On lap two, Mario Andretti passed Sullivan and led the next 13 laps. Mears suffered from transmission troubles and could only complete 7 laps, finishing last.

The first caution came out on lap 8 when third-place car Geoff Brabham spun and hit the turn three wall. Al Unser took the lead for the first time on lap 31 and established himself as the fastest car, ultimately leading 102 of the 250 laps.

On a lap 82 restart, CART officials erroneously picked up Phil Krueger as the first car behind the pace car. When the green flag was waved, Krueger's slow vehicle created a road block for the faster cars. On the backstretch, Danny Ongais was clipped by another car and barrel-rolled his car four times. Ongais was unhurt.

Josele Garza led 22 laps and was running second on lap 110 when a suspension failure sent him into the wall. On lap 163, Pancho Carter blew a tire and hit the turn three wall. Carter was cut out of his damaged car but unhurt.

On lap 201, Emerson Fittipaldi took the lead for the first time. When he pitted on lap 211, the lead returned to Unser. Unser led the next 21 laps and pitted for fuel only with 19 laps to go, giving the lead back to Fittipaldi.

With 12 laps to go, Steve Chassey blew an engine and brought out another caution. During the yellow, Unser pitted for fresh tires, placing him at the back of the pack for the restart.

With seven laps remaining, Mario Andretti lost his right-front wheel assembly and crashed hard in turn four. Andretti suffered a broken collarbone and fractured hip in the crash.

The debris from Andretti's crash was cleaned up for a one-lap run to the finish. Fittipaldi had the lapped cars of Tom Sneva and Johnny Rutherford between himself and Unser. When the green flag was thrown, Unser quickly got around Rutherford but had trouble passing Sneva, who was under the impression he was on the lead lap. Fittipaldi led the cars back to the checkered flag to take his first Indy car victory. Unser was unable to get around Sneva and finished second. Sneva finished third, one lap down.

10 cars finished the race. A record 13 caution flags for 104 laps slowed the average speed to 128.22 mph. Fittipaldi won $115,639 for his victory.

== Box score ==
Finish	Grid	No	Name	Entrant	Chassis	Engine	Laps	Time/Status	Led	Points
1	19	40	(Brazil) Emerson Fittipaldi	Patrick Racing	March 85C	Cosworth	250	3:53:58.330	29	20
2	8	11	(United States) Al Unser	Penske Racing	March 85C	Cosworth	250	+0.400	102	17
3	9	2	(United States) Tom Sneva	Gurney-Curb Racing	Eagle 85	Cosworth	249	+1 Lap	15	14
4	6	21	(United States) Johnny Rutherford	Alex Morales Motorsports	March 85C	Cosworth	248	+2 Laps	13	12
5	18	98	(United States) Ed Pimm	Gurney-Curb Racing	Eagle 85	Cosworth	248	+2 Laps	0	10
6	26	3	(United States) Bobby Rahal	Truesports	March 85C	Cosworth	247	+3 Laps	4	8
7	13	18	(United States) Kevin Cogan	Kraco Racing	March 85C	Cosworth	247	+3 Laps	0	6
8	16	37	(United States) Scott Brayton	Brayton Racing	March 85C	Cosworth	245	+5 Laps	0	5
9	14	33	(United States) Howdy Holmes	Forsythe Racing	Lola T900	Cosworth	242	+8 Laps	0	4
10	3	1	(United States) Mario Andretti	Newman/Haas Racing	Lola T900	Cosworth	241	Crash	16	3
11	29	36	(Australia) Dennis Firestone	BC Pace Racing	Lola T900	Cosworth	231	+19 Laps	0	2
12	20	56	(United States) Steve Chassey	Gohr Racing	March 85C	Chevrolet	228	Engine	0	1
13	15	9	(Colombia) Roberto Guerrero	Bignotti-Cotter Racing	March 85C	Cosworth	204	Gearbox	22	0
14	2	4	(United States) Danny Sullivan	Penske Racing	March 85C	Cosworth	203	Radiator	11	0
15	7	30	(United States) Al Unser Jr.	Doug Shierson Racing	Lola T900	Cosworth	180	Engine	0	0
16	4	6	(United States) Pancho Carter	Galles Racing	March 85C	Cosworth	162	Crash	7	0
17	22	38	(United States) Chet Fillip	Circle Bar Racing	Lola T900	Cosworth	145	Crash	0	0
18	28	71	(United States) Spike Gehlhausen	Hemelgarn Racing	Lola T900	Cosworth	127	Crash	0	0
19	10	55	(Mexico) Josele Garza	Machinists Union Racing	March 85C	Cosworth	109	Crash	31	0
20	17	25	(United States) Danny Ongais	Interscope Racing	March 85C	Cosworth	81	Crash	0	0
21	25	42	(United States) Phil Krueger	Mergard Racing	March 84C	Cosworth	78	Crash	0	0
22	27	59	(United States) Chip Ganassi	Machinists Union Racing	March 85C	Cosworth	69	Crash	0	0
23	12	20	(United States) Sammy Swindell	Patrick Racing	March 85C	Cosworth	58	Crash	0	0
24	30	19	(United States) Dale Coyne	Dale Coyne Racing	Lola T800	Chevrolet	40	Engine	0	0
25	24	22	(United States) Dick Simon	Dick Simon Racing	March 85C	Cosworth	37	Engine	0	0
26	21	24	(United States) Tom Bigelow	Leader Card Racers	March 84C	Cosworth	35	Engine	0	0
27	11	99	(United States) Michael Andretti	Kraco Racing	March 85C	Cosworth	24	Engine	0	0
28	23	23	(Brazil) Raul Boesel	Dick Simon Racing	March 84C	Cosworth	17	Manifold	0	0
29	5	7	(Australia) Geoff Brabham	Galles Racing	March 85C	Cosworth	7	Crash	0	0
30	1	5	(United States) Rick Mears	Penske Racing	March 85C	Cosworth	7	Transmission	0	1

=== Failed to qualify ===
- (United States) A. J. Foyt (#14) – withdrawn
- (Netherlands) Arie Luyendyk (#61) – withdrawn

=== Race statistics ===
Lap Leaders
Laps	Leader
1	Danny Sullivan
2–14	Mario Andretti
15	Danny Sullivan
16–17	Mario Andretti
18–30	Johnny Rutherford
31–36	Al Unser
37–40	Roberto Guerrero
41–48	Tom Sneva
49–54	Roberto Guerrero
55–63	Al Unser
64–72	Josele Garza
73–76	Bobby Rahal
77–81	Al Unser
82–103	Josele Garza
104–128	Al Unser
129	Mario Andretti
130–136	Pancho Carter
137–139	Roberto Guerrero
140–144	Tom Sneva
145–150	Roberto Guerrero
151–159	Danny Sullivan
160–195	Al Unser
196	Tom Sneva
197–199	Roberto Guerrero
200	Tom Sneva
201–210	Emerson Fittipaldi
211–231	Al Unser
232–250	Emerson Fittipaldi

== Broadcasting ==
NBC planned to broadcast the race live as they did the past four years. When the race was delayed, NBC reaired the 1984 race in its timeslot.

NBC was unable to broadcast the rescheduled race a week later as their local affiliates had already sold the air time. Attempts were made to air the race on a cable network but found it was impossible to get equipment to the track in time. The race had no television coverage.

NBC was displeased with CART's decision to postpone the race and the network incurred losses of $400,000. Rain delay losses were covered by NBC's insurance while tire-related delays were not. The matter affected their decision of broadcasting the 1986 season. 1986 was CART's final year in their TV contract with NBC, and NBC did not commit to televise any CART races until the spring of 1986, which included a now tape-delayed broadcast of the 1986 Michigan 500.

NBC considered legal action against CART to recoup the money lost. About the subject of a lawsuit, NBC executive Sean McManus stated in February 1986, "There were discussions about it but it was such a legal morass it wasn't worth going to court. The Michigan problem is buried and gone."

Paul Page served as the lead anchor of the radio broadcast.
