= 1985 Beatrice Indy Challenge =

Fifteenth round of the 1985 CART season

(United States) 1985 Beatrice Indy Challenge
Race details
15th round of the 1985 CART season
← Previous race	Next race →
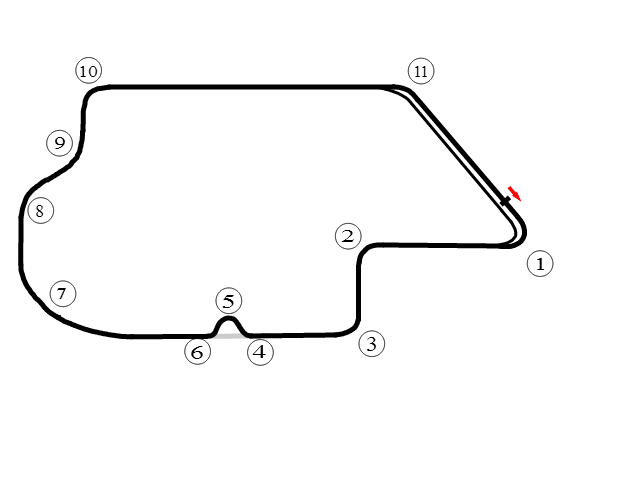
- Layout of the Tamiami Park circuit
- Date: November 9, 1985
- Official name: Beatrice Indy Challenge
- Location: Streets of Tamiami Park, Tamiami Park, Florida
- Course: Temporary street circuit 1.784 mi / 2.871 km
- Distance: 112 laps 199.808 mi / 321.560 km

Pole position
- Driver: (United States) Bobby Rahal (Truesports)
- Time: 56.408

Podium
- First: (United States) Danny Sullivan (Team Penske)
- Second: (United States) Bobby Rahal (Truesports)
- Third: (United States) Al Unser Jr. (Doug Shierson Racing)

Chronology
Previous	Next
–	1986

The 1985 Beatrice Indy Challenge was the fifteenth and final round of the 1985 CART season. The race was held on November 9, 1985, in Tamiami Park, Florida at the streets of Tamiami Park. The race was contested of 112 laps. Danny Sullivan won the race. Bobby Rahal finished 2nd, and Al Unser Jr. finished 3rd. Al Unser and Roberto Moreno rounded out the top five, and Danny Ongais, Arie Luyendyk, Bill Whittington, Josele Garza, and Rupert Keegan rounded out the top ten.

In one of the most dramatic championship finales in Indy car racing history, Al Unser wound up winning his third and final Indy car championship over his son, Al Unser Jr., by just 1 point, and earned the $300,000 championship prize. Unser became the oldest driver in Indy car history to win a championship, at 46 years, 5 months and 12 days old.

== Report ==
=== Background ===
In December 1984, CART announced that the 1985 season finale would be held on the streets of Tamiami Park in Miami, Florida on October 27. It would be the first Indy car race held in the Miami area since 1926, when Pete DePaolo won a 300-mile race at Fulford–Miami Speedway. The race was later rescheduled to November 9.

=== Championship standings before the race ===
Al Unser had a slim three-point gap over his son, Al Unser Jr., following Unser Sr.'s dominant win in the Dana 150 at Phoenix. Since Mario Andretti, who was third in the points standings, was 23 points behind Unser Sr., he and everyone else beneath him in the standings were ineligible to win the title, as the maximum amount of points that could be earned from a CART race at the time was 22 points (20 points for winning, 1 point for winning the pole, and 1 point for leading the most laps). This meant that the 1985 championship would go down to the Unser father-son duo.

== Practice ==
On Thursday, November 7, a pair of hour-long practice sessions were held in the afternoon. Danny Sullivan, the 1985 Indianapolis 500 winner, would set the fastest laps of both sessions. He averaged a speed of 109.121 mph (175.613 km/h) in the sessions. Little Al set the eighth fastest speed, while Big Al set the thirteenth fastest speed.

== Qualifying ==
The qualifying session was held on Friday, November 8. The session was divided into two timed groups, with the fastest overall driver from both groups winning the pole.

Bobby Rahal, driving for Truesports, would score the pole for the race, with a time of 56.408, and a speed of 113.856 mph.

Four drivers failed to qualify: Dale Coyne, Darin Brassfield, Scott Brayton, and Steve Chassey.

=== Qualifying classification ===
Pos	No.	Driver	Team	Chassis	Engine	Time	Final grid
1	3	(United States) Bobby Rahal	Truesports	March	Cosworth	56.408	1
2	7	(Australia) Geoff Brabham	Galles Racing	March	Cosworth	56.535	2
3	20	(Italy) Bruno Giacomelli R	Patrick Racing	March	Cosworth	56.883	3
4	4	(United States) Danny Sullivan	Team Penske	March	Cosworth	57.482	4
5	6	(Brazil) Roberto Moreno	Galles Racing	March	Cosworth	57.695	5
6	33	(Netherlands) Jan Lammers	Forsythe Racing	Lola	Cosworth	57.773	6
7	40	(Brazil) Emerson Fittipaldi	Patrick Racing	March	Cosworth	57.892	7
8	30	(United States) Al Unser Jr.	Doug Shierson Racing	Lola	Cosworth	57.912	8
9	1	(United States) Mario Andretti	Newman/Haas Racing	Lola	Cosworth	57.936	9
10	9	(Colombia) Roberto Guerrero	Team Cotter	March	Cosworth	58.206	10
11	61	(Netherlands) Arie Luyendyk R	Provimi Racing	Lola	Cosworth	58.296	11
12	5	(United States) Al Unser	Team Penske	March	Cosworth	58.432	12
13	22	(Brazil) Raul Boesel R	Dick Simon Racing	March	Cosworth	58.641	13
14	12	(United States) Bill Whittington	Arciero Racing	March	Cosworth	58.769	14
15	36	(United Kingdom) Jim Crawford	Pace Racing	Lola	Cosworth	59.321	15
16	27	(United Kingdom) Ian Ashley	Tom Hess Racing	Lola	Cosworth	59.595	16
17	18	(United States) Kevin Cogan	Kraco Racing	March	Cosworth	59.832	17
18	76	(Canada) Jacques Villeneuve Sr.	Canadian Tire Racing	March	Cosworth	59.897	18
19	25	(United States) Danny Ongais	Interscope Racing	March	Cosworth	1:00.021	19
20	99	(United States) Michael Andretti	Kraco Racing	March	Cosworth	1:00.100	20
21	57	(United States) Randy Lanier	Arciero Racing	Lola	Cosworth	1:00.439	21
22	55	(Mexico) Josele Garza	Machinists Union Racing	March	Cosworth	1:00.751	22
23	14	(United States) A. J. Foyt	A. J. Foyt Racing	March	Cosworth	1:00.765	23
24	21	(United States) Johnny Rutherford	Alex Morales Motorsports	March	Cosworth	1:00.957	24
25	59	(United Kingdom) Rupert Keegan R	Machinists Union Racing	March	Cosworth	1:01.062	25
26	2	(United States) Tom Sneva	All American Racers	Eagle	Cosworth	1:01.082	26
27	24	(United States) Dominic Dobson	Leader Card Racing	March	Cosworth	1:01.224	27
28	98	(United States) Ed Pimm	All American Racers	Eagle	Cosworth	1:01.286	28
Failed to qualify
29	56	(United States) Steve Chassey	Gohr Racing	March	Chevrolet	1:04.128	—
30	19	(United States) Dale Coyne	Dale Coyne Racing	Lola	Chevrolet	1:06.543	—
31	34	(United States) Darin Brassfield R	Wysard Racing	Lola	Cosworth	—	—
32	71	(United States) Scott Brayton	Hemelgarn Racing	Lola	Cosworth	—	—

== Race ==
=== Race report ===
==== Start ====
With an estimated 50,000 people in attendance, the 28 drivers fired off, two-by-two, in a rolling start. However, heading into the narrow turn 1, Mario Andretti locked up his brakes and hit Emerson Fittipaldi, which sent both Fittipaldi and Roberto Guerrero into the concrete wall. All three drivers were uninjured and walked out, though they all retired from the race.

The destruction only continued as the first lap was completed. Exiting turn 7, Raul Boesel looped his car around. As his turbocharger caught on fire, Kevin Cogan swerved to the right of the track to avoid Boesel, only for them to collide anyway. Michael Andretti, Cogan's teammate, also T-boned Boesel. The drivers were uninjured, but their cars were too destroyed to continue. Meanwhile, Big Al was running in 9th, only two positions behind Little Al.

==== First half ====
The race was finally restarted ten laps later, and pole sitter Bobby Rahal quickly ran off with the lead. A lap after the restart, Geoff Brabham, running 2nd, drove into the pits for an unscheduled pit stop. Brabham would eventually retire from the race, citing ignition issues as the reason. Bruno Giacomelli and Jan Lammers battled for 2nd as Rahal continued leading. On lap 37, Rahal gave up the lead for the first time all race and eventually pitted, which kicked off the first round of green-flag pit stops. Little Al pitted a few laps before Big Al did. Giacomelli led his first few laps of the race before he pitted on lap 40, giving the lead back to Rahal.

On lap 50, British drivers Jim Crawford and Ian Ashley collided in turn 1, ending both of their races and bringing the second caution of the race. As things stood, Little Al was 1 point ahead of his father.

==== Second half ====
When the race restarted on lap 62, Bobby Rahal had clinched the bonus point for most laps led. Little Al was continuing his steady pace in 5th as Big Al tried to pass other cars to gain points. On lap 69, Giacomelli, who was on pace to earning his first ever podium finish in CART, was sidelined after he crashed in turn 1. He was uninjured, though he never raced in CART again.

As this was happening, Big Al finally began closing in on Little Al, who was still running 5th. Big Al was battling with rookie Arie Luyendyk for 6th. Rahal gave up the lead for the second time when he pitted for a routine stop on lap 74. During this round of green-flag pit stops, Big Al decided to shake up his strategy and pit before his son did. Little Al's pit stop was nearly 2 seconds slower than Big Al's pit stop, though Little Al retained 4th while Big Al was in 6th.

On the racetrack, Jan Lammers and Danny Sullivan battled hard for the lead, to the point where Lammers nearly went off-track in the esses. Both drivers decided to pit for the final time on lap 78. Sullivan, who had the closest pit stall to the exit of pit road, fired off before Lammers did, which gave Sullivan the lead for the first time in the race. Rahal would never lead another lap in the race, as he battled chassis issues.

On lap 81, as Lammers continued chasing down Sullivan for the race lead, he spun in the esses and was beached in the sand trap. Lammers' car never refired and he did not finish the race. With Lammers' retirement, Little Al ran in 3rd, while Big Al ran in 5th. Little Ai still held the hypothetical points lead by 1 point over his father.

On lap 95, Dominic Dobson, who was running inside the top 15 after qualifying 27th, blew an engine in turn 1. Dobson was forced to retire, ultimately finishing 11th.

Big Al, who still needed 2 points to take the championship lead, came to life on lap 103 as Roberto Moreno maneuvered around lapped traffic. On lap 108, Big Al finally passed Moreno for fourth position in turn 2, and for the first time all race, the elder Unser had the championship lead over his son by one point.

Unfortunately for Little Al, the closest car ahead of him (Bobby Rahal) was about 15 seconds ahead of him, which was an insurmountable gap for the final four laps. As Danny Sullivan won the race, the fifth win of his CART career and his first since his Indy 500 win earlier that year, his Penske teammate Al Unser Sr. held onto 4th place and won the 1985 CART championship by one point over his son Al Unser Jr., who finished 3rd.

=== Race classification ===
Pos	No.	Driver	Team	Chassis	Engine	Laps	Time/Retired	Grid	Laps Led	Pts.
1	4	(United States) Danny Sullivan	Team Penske	March	Cosworth	112	2:04:59.410	4	34	20
2	3	(United States) Bobby Rahal	Truesports	March	Cosworth	112	+16.800	1	70	18
3	30	(United States) Al Unser Jr.	Doug Shierson Racing	Lola	Cosworth	112	Running	8	0	14
4	5	(United States) Al Unser	Team Penske	March	Cosworth	112	Running	12	0	12
5	6	(Brazil) Roberto Moreno	Galles Racing	March	Cosworth	112	Running	5	0	10
6	25	(United States) Danny Ongais	Interscope Racing	March	Cosworth	110	+2 Laps	19	0	8
7	61	(Netherlands) Arie Luyendyk R	Provimi Racing	Lola	Cosworth	110	+2 Laps	11	0	6
8	12	(United States) Bill Whittington	Arciero Racing	March	Cosworth	110	+2 Laps	14	0	5
9	55	(Mexico) Josele Garza	Machinists Union Racing	March	Cosworth	109	+3 Laps	22	0	4
10	59	(United Kingdom) Rupert Keegan R	Machinists Union Racing	March	Cosworth	100	Gas Pedal	25	0	3
11	24	(United States) Dominic Dobson	Leader Card Racing	March	Cosworth	95	Engine	27	0	2
12	98	(United States) Ed Pimm	All American Racers	Eagle	Cosworth	95	+17 Laps	28	0	1
13	33	(Netherlands) Jan Lammers	Forsythe Racing	Lola	Cosworth	81	Accident	6	5	0
14	20	(Italy) Bruno Giacomelli R	Patrick Racing	March	Cosworth	68	Accident	3	3	0
15	57	(United States) Randy Lanier	Arciero Racing	Lola	Cosworth	68	Oil Leak	21	0	0
16	36	(United Kingdom) Jim Crawford	Pace Racing	Lola	Cosworth	50	Accident	15	0	0
17	76	(Canada) Jacques Villeneuve Sr.	Canadian Tire Racing	March	Cosworth	50	Engine	18	0	0
18	27	(United Kingdom) Ian Ashley	Tom Hess Racing	Lola	Cosworth	49	Accident	16	0	0
19	21	(United States) Johnny Rutherford	Alex Morales Motorsports	March	Cosworth	42	Accident	24	0	0
20	14	(United States) A. J. Foyt	A. J. Foyt Racing	March	Cosworth	24	Engine	23	0	0
21	2	(United States) Tom Sneva	All American Racers	Eagle	Cosworth	23	Engine	26	0	0
22	7	(Australia) Geoff Brabham	Galles Racing	March	Cosworth	15	Ignition	2	0	0
23	22	(Brazil) Raul Boesel R	Dick Simon Racing	March	Cosworth	1	Accident	13	0	0
24	18	(United States) Kevin Cogan	Kraco Racing	March	Cosworth	1	Accident	17	0	0
25	99	(United States) Michael Andretti	Kraco Racing	March	Cosworth	1	Accident	20	0	0
26	40	(Brazil) Emerson Fittipaldi	Patrick Racing	March	Cosworth	0	Accident	7	0	0
27	1	(United States) Mario Andretti	Newman/Haas Racing	Lola	Cosworth	0	Accident	9	0	0
28	9	(Colombia) Roberto Guerrero	Team Cotter	March	Cosworth	0	Accident	10	0	0

== Championship standings after the race ==
Drivers' Championship standings

	Pos.	Driver	Points
Unchanged	1	(United States) Al Unser	151
Unchanged	2	(United States) Al Unser Jr.	150 (–1)
1	3	(United States) Bobby Rahal	133 (–18)
1	4	(United States) Danny Sullivan	126 (–25)
2	5	(United States) Mario Andretti	116 (–35)

- Note: Only the top five positions are included.

Previous race: 1985 Dana 150	Indy Car Indycar World Series; 1985 season	Next race: 1986 Dana 200 for Special Olympics
Previous race: –	Beatrice Indy Challenge	Next race: 1986 Nissan Indy Challenge
