= March 85C =

Race Car

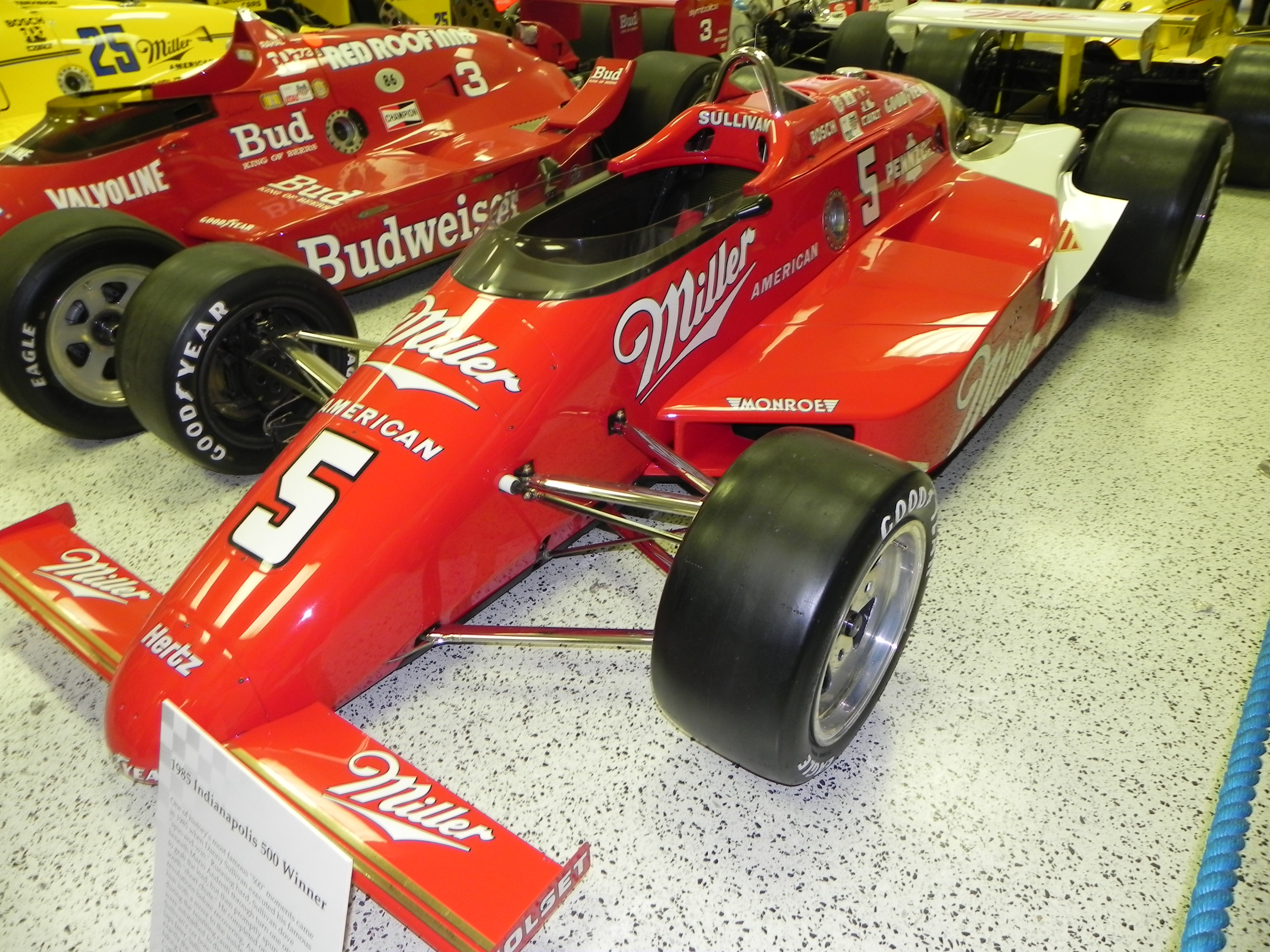
Image of the winning car of the 1985 Indianapolis 500 (Danny Sullivan)

The March 85C is an open-wheel race car, designed by Adrian Newey, and built by March Engineering, to compete in the 1985 IndyCar season. March would win 10 out of the 15 races that season, along with taking 12 pole positions. Newey's March 85C chassis would clinch the 1985 IndyCar championship in the hands of Al Unser, and the 1985 Indianapolis 500 with Danny Sullivan, with his famous "spin-and-win." It was powered by the Buick Indy V6 turbo engine, which powered Pancho Carter to pole position, and Scott Brayton to second position at the Indianapolis 500, sweeping the top two spots, and the Ford-Cosworth DFX turbo V8 engine.

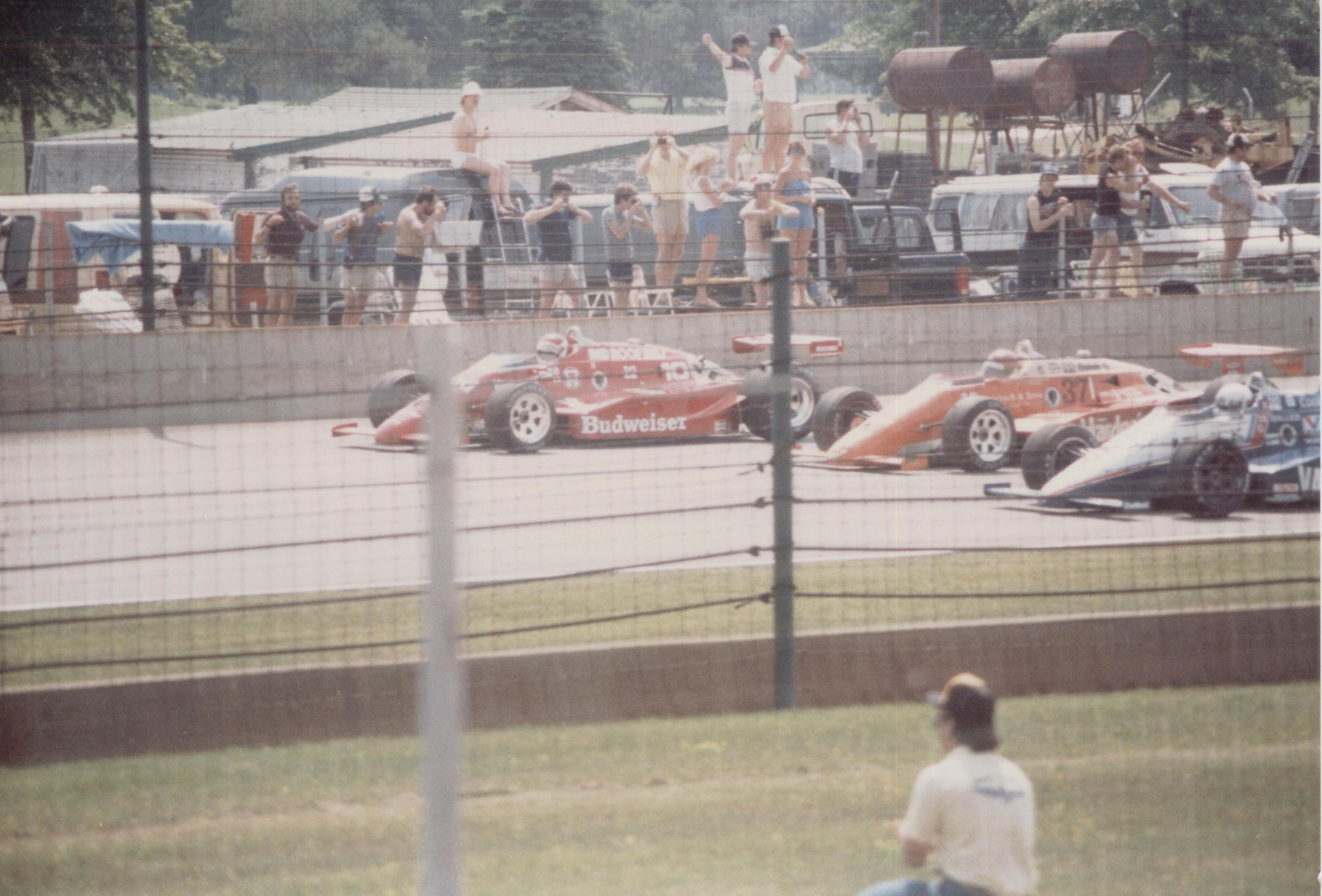
The front row of the starting grid for the 1985 Indianapolis 500 composed entirely of March 85Cs

A modified 85C was used to construct the Oldsmobile Aerotech in 1987.
