= Ed Pimm =

American racing driver (born 1956)

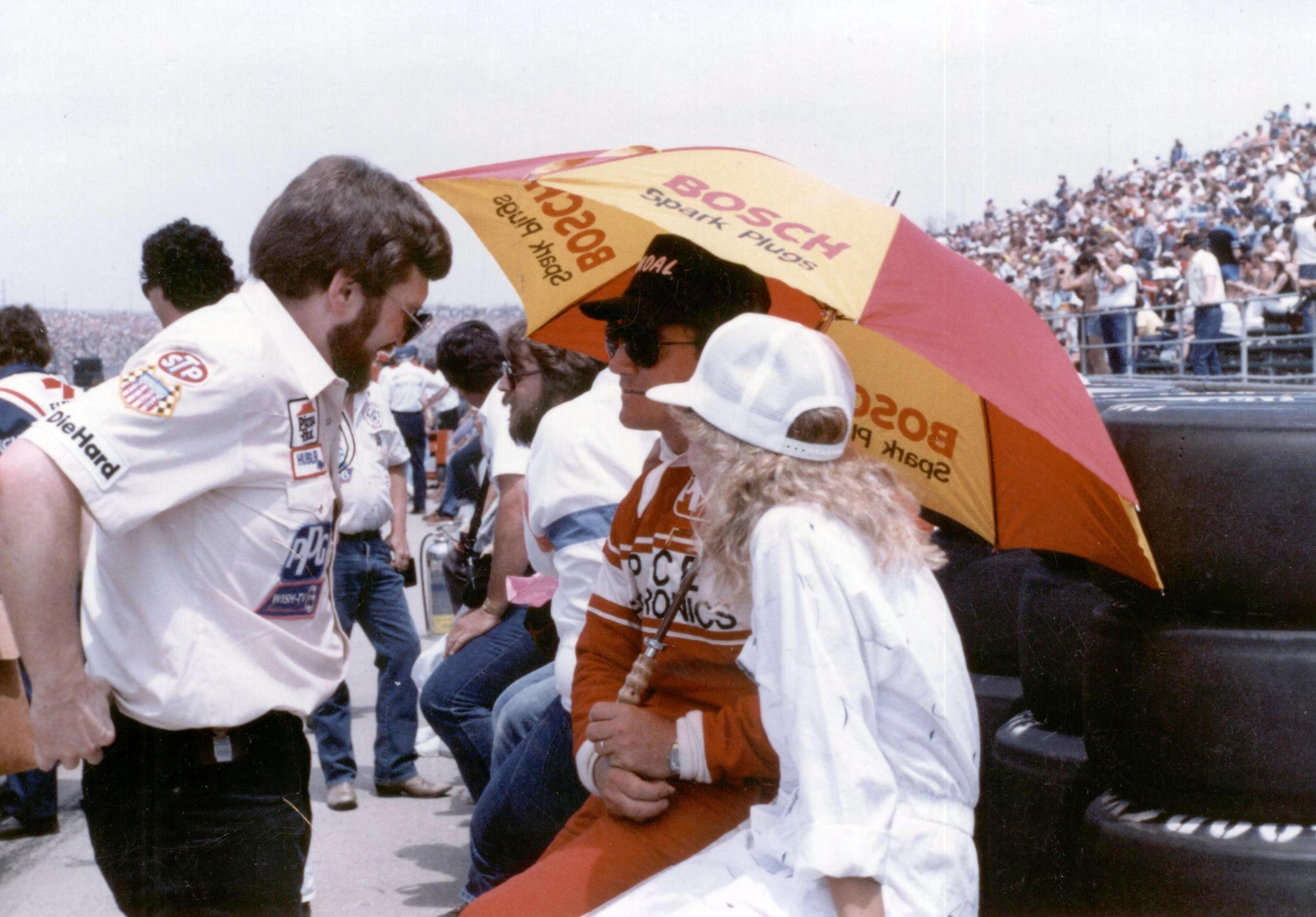
- Pimm at the 1986 Indianapolis 500
- Born: May 3, 1956 (age 70) Rock Tavern, New York, U.S.

Champ Car career
- 42 races run over 5 years
- Best finish: 13th (1985)
- First race: 1984 Toyota Grand Prix of Long Beach (Long Beach)
- Last race: 1988 Briggs & Stratton 200 (Road America)
Wins	Podiums	Poles
0	1	0

NASCAR Cup Series career
- 5 races run over 2 years
- Best finish: 60th (1988)
- First race: 1987 Winston 500 (Talladega)
- Last race: 1988 Goodwrench 500 (Rockingham)
Wins	Top tens	Poles
0	0	0

Ed Pimm (born May 3, 1956 in Rock Tavern, New York) is an American former driver in the CART Championship Car series.

Pimm raced in the 1984–1988 seasons, with 42 career starts, including the 1985–1987 Indianapolis 500s. He drove two CART events for Gary Trout Motorsports finishing twelfth at Mid-Ohio and fourteenth at Elkart Lake. He finished in the top-ten twelve times, with his best finish in third position in 1985 at Michigan. In 1987 and 1988, he also made five Winston Cup starts. Earlier in his career, he was the 1983 US Super Vee champion.

== NASCAR career ==
In 1987 and 1988, Pimm also made five Winston Cup starts. He debuted in 1987, driving for Curb Racing at Talladega. Starting a year-long best thirtieth, Pimm led one lap and settled for a 27th place effort after an engine issue. His run earned him two more races for the team, finishing 34th after an engine issue at Daytona and then crashed to 42nd in the season finale at Atlanta Motor Speedway.

Pimm returned to the team in early 1988, running two races. He made the prestigious Daytona 500, starting fortieth but ending with a career-best 24th place showing. It was also his only race in Cup competition that he was running at the end. Two weeks later, at Rockingham, Pimm started a career-best 29th before crashing to 34th.

Pimm never returned to NASCAR after that race.

== Racing record ==
=== American open–wheel racing results ===
(key) (Races in bold indicate pole position; races in italics indicate fastest lap.)

==== SCCA National Championship Runoffs ====
Year	Track	Car	Engine	Class	Finish	Start	Status
1978	Road Atlanta	Zink	Ford	Formula Ford	9	8	Running
1979	Road Atlanta	PBS	Ford	Formula Ford	27	14	Running

==== Complete USAC Mini-Indy Series results ====
Year	Entrant	1	2	3	4	5	6	Pos	Points
1980	Fleet Power Racing	MIL; 22	POC; 3	MOH; 18	MIN1; 22	MIN2; 7	ONT	**10th**	**210**

==== Formula Super Vee ====
Year	Team	Chassis	Engine	1	2	3	4	5	6	7	8	9	10	11	Rank	Points
1983	Red Roof Inns	Anson SA4, Ralt RT5/83	VW Brabham	LBH; 9	MSP; 4	**MIL**; 1	**CLE**; 3	ROA; 4	POC; 1	**MOH**; 1	MCH; 1	RIV; 1	LS; 6	**PHX**; 8	**1st**	**151**

==== Indy Car World Series ====
Year	Team	1	2	3	4	5	6	7	8	9	10	11	12	13	14	15	16	17	Rank	Points	Ref
1984	Jet Engineering	LBH; 12	PHX1; Wth	INDY; DNQ	MIL; 19	POR; 16	MEA; 22	CLE; DNQ	MIS1; 33										36th	5	
1984	All American Racers									ROA; 26	POC; 13	MOH; 22	SAN; 22	MIS2; 19	PHX2; 10	LAG; 12	LVG; 19		36th	5	
1985	All American Racers	LBH; 12	INDY; 9	MIL; 21	POR; 19	MEA; DNQ	CLE	MIS1; 5	ROA; 11	POC; 20	MOH; 9	SAN; 8	MIS2; 3	LAG; 14	PHX; 9	MIA; 12			13th	45	
1986	Curb-All American Racers	PHX1; 22	LBH; 22	INDY; 17	MIL; 10	POR; 6	MEA; 12	CLE; Wth	TOR	MIS1; 15	POC; 24	MOH	SAN	MIS2; 7	ROA	LAG; 11	PHX2; 7	MIA; 10	18th	29	
1987	Curb Motorsports	LBH	PHX	INDY; 21	MIL	POR	MEA	CLE	TOR	MIS; 16	POC	ROA	MOH	NAZ	LAG	MIA			41st	0	
1988	Elmer Fields Racing	PHX	LBH	INDY; DNQ	MIL	POR	CLE	TOR	MEA	MIS	POC								35th	1	
1988	Gary Trout Motorsports											MOH; 12	ROA; 15	NAZ	LAG	MIA			35th	1	

==== Indianapolis 500 results ====
Year	Chassis	Engine	Start	Finish
1984	March	Chevrolet	Failed to Qualify	
1985	Eagle	Cosworth	22nd	9th
1986	March	Cosworth	10th	17th
1987	March	Cosworth	30th	21st
1988	March	Cosworth	Qualifying Crash	

=== NASCAR Winston Cup Series ===
NASCAR Winston Cup Series results
Year	Team	No.	Make	1	2	3	4	5	6	7	8	9	10	11	12	13	14	15	16	17	18	19	20	21	22	23	24	25	26	27	28	29	NWCC	Pts	Ref
1987	Curb Racing	98	Buick	DAY; DNQ	CAR	RCH	ATL	DAR	NWS	BRI	MAR	TAL; 27	CLT	DOV	POC	RSD	MCH	DAY; 34	POC	TAL	GLN	MCH	BRI	DAR	RCH	DOV	MAR	NWS	CLT	CAR	RSD	ATL; 42	64th	185	
1988	Curb Racing	98	Buick	DAY; 24	RCH; DNQ	CAR; 34	ATL	DAR	BRI	NWS	MAR	TAL	CLT	DOV	RSD	POC	MCH	DAY	POC	TAL	GLN	MCH	BRI	DAR	RCH	DOV	MAR	CLT	NWS	CAR	PHO	ATL	60th	152	

==== Daytona 500 ====
Year	Team	Manufacturer	Start	Finish
1987	Curb Racing	Buick	DNQ	
1988	Curb Racing	Buick	40	24

Sporting positions
Preceded by Michael Andretti	US Formula Super Vee; Champion; 1983	Succeeded by Arie Luyendyk
