= Lola T900 =

Racing car designed and built by Lola Racing Cars

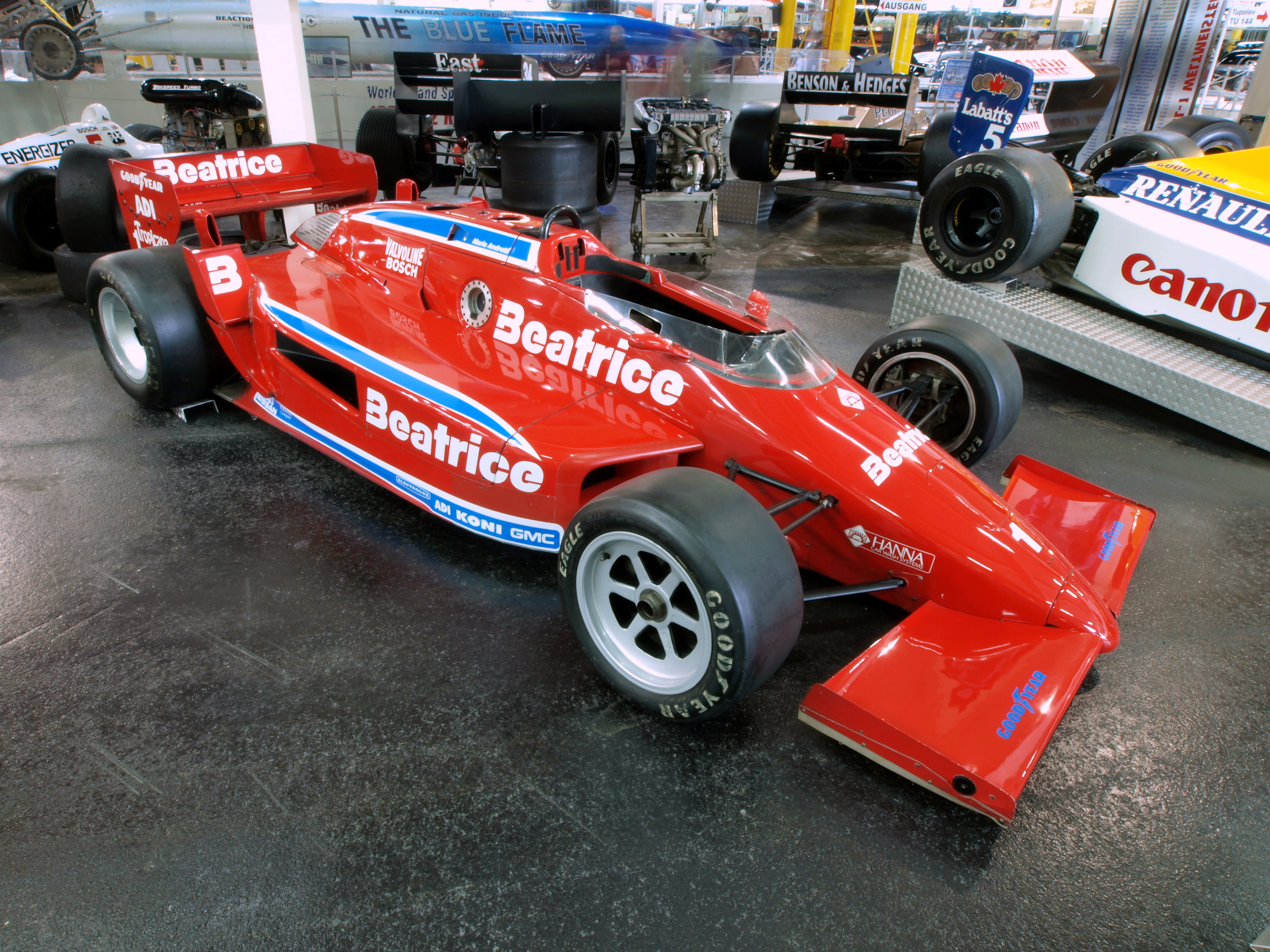
- Category: CART IndyCar
- Constructor: Lola
- Predecessor: Lola T800
- Successor: Lola T86/00

Technical specifications
- Length: 4,978 mm (196 in)
- Width: 2,032 mm (80 in)
- Height: 940 mm (37 in)
- Axle track: 1,753 mm (69 in) (Front); 1,638 mm (64 in) (Rear)
- Wheelbase: 3,048 mm (120 in)
- Engine: Ford-Cosworth DFX 2.65 L (2,650 cc; 162 cu in) V8 mid-engined
- Transmission: 6-speed manual
- Power: 800 hp (600 kW)
- Weight: 1,550 lb (700 kg)
- Fuel: Methanol
- Tyres: Goodyear

Competition history
- Notable drivers: Al Unser Jr. Mario Andretti
- Debut: 1985 Long Beach Grand Prix
Entries	Wins	Poles
15	5	3

The Lola T900 is an open-wheel racing car chassis, designed and built by Lola Cars that competed in the CART open-wheel racing series, for competition in the 1985 IndyCar season. It won a total of 5 races that season, with Al Unser Jr. taking 2 wins, and Mario Andretti taking 3 wins, while narrowly missing out on another win at that year's Indianapolis 500. It was powered by the 800 hp (600 kW) Ford-Cosworth DFX.
