= Alex Morales Motorsports =

Racing team

Alex Morales Motorsports was a racing team active in sprint cars and Indycars for several decades. The sprint car team won multiple championships between the 1950s and 1990s while their Indycar team was active from 1975 to 1989, winning three races. The team was owned by California businessman Alex Morales who sponsored the team with his Alex Foods brand in the earlier years and was managed by chief mechanic John Capels, who later served on CART’s board of directors.

== Early years and sprint cars ==
Alex Morales, born in 1908, came from a family that had early success in the food industry with Tamale Carts in Los Angeles. Morales started entering sprint cars in California in the 1920s and continued for several decades. His “Tamale Wagon” sprint cars (named after one of his most popular products) enjoyed tremendous success around the tracks of California for many years, with their first championship coming in 1959 at the hands of Chuck Hulse. Morales continued to run sprint cars into the 1990s.

== Indycars, 1970s ==
In the mid-1970s Morales got together with former Vel’s Parnelli Jones mechanic John Capels (who left the team when they downsized) to run an Indycar team for California-based drivers. The team made their debut with driver Jimmy Caruthers running an Eagle-Offenhauser at the 1975 California 500. Carruthers died from cancer in late 1975, not long after recording the team’s best result of the season, a 4th place at Michigan International Speedway. The team pressed on in 1976 with a two-car effort, running Eagles for rookie Bobby Olivero and veteran Bill Vukovich II however reliability issues saw only one top 5 finish by Vukovich at Texas World Speedway. In 1977 the team scaled back to one car for most races running Vukovich in early races before Olivero took over at Indy. A switch from Eagle to Lightning chassis starting at the Indy 500 saw an uptick in results with Pancho Carter coming on board in as second car at the season-ending race in Phoenix and recording the team’s best finish to date, a third-place finish. Despite some solid results early in 1978, Olivero was replaced by Mike Mosley for the second half of the season but reliability concerns limited him to three top-10 finishes.

== Breakthrough and success in the 1980s ==
As a result of the 1979 USAC/CART split, Morales decided to race in the CART series with Carter running their now aging Lightning Chassis; however, he was only able to manage 13th in the standings as the Offenhauser engines were becoming increasingly obsolete. In 1980 Morales continued with Carter but were able to upgrade to a Penske-Cosworth combination, which saw a significant improvement as Carter finished 5th in the points, with a best finish of third at Michigan. The success with the Penske continued into 1981 as Carter won the team's first race at the Michigan 500 and finished third in the CART standings. Carter followed that up with an impressive third-place finish at the 1982 Indy 500 as the Morales team became one of early adopters of the March chassis program but the next two seasons as a whole were not as successful, not recording a single top 5 finish in both the 1982 and 1983 CART seasons (the Indy 500 was not a CART points race in 1982). For 1984 Carter was replaced by Al Holbert who, despite an impressive 4th at Indy, only finished 18th in CART points. In 1985 Morales hired 3 time Indy champion Johnny Rutherford and obtained sponsorship from Vermont American. Rutherford had a successful first two seasons for the team, winning at Sanair in 1985 (albeit under controversial circumstances after Pancho Carter passed him at the line under yellow) and finished 11th in the points. In 1986 Rutherford again was 11th in the points and won Morales’ third Indycar race, the 1986 Michigan 500. The team retained Rutherford for 1987 but the March Chassis was not as competitive as in previous seasons and Rutherford slipped to 18th in the standings with a best finish of 7th at Portland. Rutherford and Morales went their separate ways and the team brought in Howdy Holmes for 1988 to drive their March 88C-Cosworth package but both suppliers were falling behind rival manufacturers such as Lola, Penske and Chevrolet. As a result, Holmes wasn't able to better Rutherford’s 18th-place finish from the year before.

== Alfa Romeo and the end ==
Despite the death of Alex Morales in November 1988, the team forged on as the factory Alfa Romeo team for 1989, now managed by Johnny Capels. The team would now enter a specially designed March chassis, the 89CE. The engine development was behind schedule and they only made their debut at the fifth round of the championship in Detroit where driver Roberto Guerrero finished 8th in what would end up being the best result of the season for the Morales Alfa Romeo as unreliability and a horsepower deficit saw Guerrero only score points in one more race, a 12th-place finish at Mid-Ohio. At the end of the season the Alfa Romeo program and Morales CART franchise was transferred to Pat Patrick whose re-founded Patrick Racing team moved into the former Morales shop in Indianapolis.
