= 1985 Indianapolis 500 =

American motor race

69th Indianapolis 500
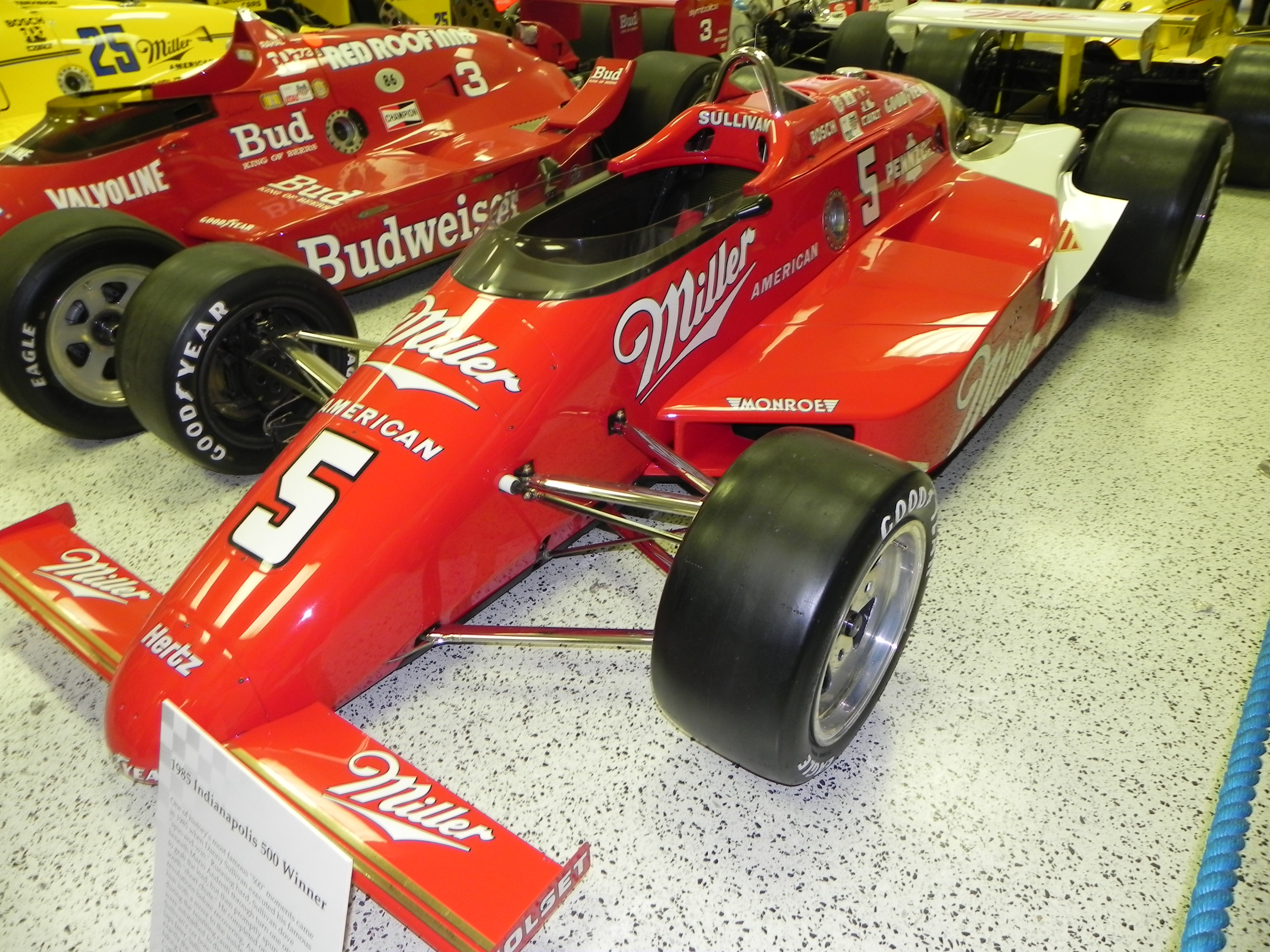

Indianapolis Motor Speedway

Indianapolis 500
- Sanctioning body: USAC
- Season: 1985 CART season 1984–85 Gold Crown
- Date: May 26, 1985
- Winner: (United States) Danny Sullivan
- Winning team: Penske Racing
- Winning Chief Mechanic: Chuck Sprague
- Time of race: 3:16:06.069
- Average speed: 152.982 mph (246.201 km/h)
- Pole position: (United States) Pancho Carter
- Pole speed: 212.583 mph (342.119 km/h)
- Fastest qualifier: (United States) Pancho Carter
- Rookie of the Year: (Netherlands) Arie Luyendyk
- Most laps led: (United States) Mario Andretti (107)

Pre-race ceremonies
- National anthem: Robert McFarlin
- "Back Home Again in Indiana": The Voices of Liberty, conducted by Mickey Mouse
- Starting command: Mary F. Hulman
- Pace car: Oldsmobile Cutlass Calais
- Pace car driver: James Garner
- Starter: Duane Sweeney
- Estimated attendance: 400,000

Television in the United States
- Network: ABC
- Announcers: Host/Lap-by-lap: Jim McKay; Color Analyst: Sam Posey
- Nielsen ratings: 9.7 / 18

Chronology
| Previous | Next |
|---|---|
| 1984 | 1986 |

The 69th Indianapolis 500 was held at the Indianapolis Motor Speedway in Speedway, Indiana, on Sunday, May 26, 1985. The race was sanctioned by USAC, and was included as part of the 1985 CART PPG Indy Car World Series. The Speedway celebrated forty years of ownership by the Hulman/George family.

In one of the most dramatic moments in Indy 500 history, Danny Sullivan took the lead from Mario Andretti on lap 120. But as he was completing the pass, Sullivan's car stepped out, and he lost control. He spun directly in front of Andretti in turn one, doing a complete 360°. Andretti veered to the inside and slipped by unscathed, while Sullivan's car somehow avoided contact with the concrete wall. Sullivan remarkably gathered control without stalling the engine, and continued in the race. About twenty laps later, Sullivan managed to re-pass Andretti for the lead, this time cleanly. Sullivan led the final 61 laps, and scored his first and only Indy victory. It was the fifth Indy win for car owner Roger Penske (Penske Racing), tying the record at the time held by Lou Moore.

Due to the electrifying spin by Sullivan, and the subsequent recovery, the race became known in auto racing lore as the "Spin and Win". It is largely considered one of the most famous moments in all of Indy car racing history.

The 1985 Indy 500 was the breakout race for the "stock block" Buick Indy V6 engine. Pancho Carter and Scott Brayton swept the top two spots on the starting grid with the pushrod Buick, setting new track record speeds in time trials. However, both cars still had questionable reliability for the full 500 miles, and both dropped out early with mechanical problems on race day.

== Background ==
Defending Indy winner Rick Mears suffered serious leg injuries in a crash at Sanair Super Speedway in August 1984. He missed the rest of the 1984 season, and would run only a part-time schedule in 1985. The 1985 Indy 500 was his first race back after recovery. Danny Sullivan joined Penske Racing for 1985. Al Unser Sr., who was filling in for Mears during the rest of the season, took the wheel of a third Penske entry for Indy.

Willy T. Ribbs entered the Rookie Orientation Program in April, hoping to become the first African American driver to qualify for the Indy 500. However, after 20 laps of testing, he managed only 172 mph, and withdrew, citing his inexperience. He would return in 1991.

This would be the final Indy 500 broadcast on television in tape delay. Later in the summer, ABC-TV signed a deal to broadcast the Indy 500 live for the first time starting in 1986. It would also be Jim McKay's final Indy 500 as play-by-play anchor.

A. J. Foyt announced during the month he was planning to retire after the 1987 race, which would be his 30th start. The decision was later retracted. Foyt entered the month of May 1985 with the opportunity to pass the 10,000 mile mark in competition at Indy, and the race would mark his record 300th career Indy car start.

At the conclusion of the race, the Speedway planned to tear down the legendary Gasoline Alley garage area, in preparations for construction of a new, modern garage facility. This would be the final Indy 500 field to utilize the famous landmark green and white "barn-like" garages.

== Race schedule ==
Race schedule — April/May 1985
| Sun | Mon | Tue | Wed | Thu | Fri | Sat |
|---|---|---|---|---|---|---|
| 21 | 22 | 23 | 34 | 25 | 26; ROP | 27; ROP |
| 28; ROP | 29 | 30 | 1 | 2 | 3 | 4 Practice |
| 5 Practice | 6 Practice | 7 Practice | 8 Practice | 9 Practice | 10; Practice | 11; Pole Day |
| 12; Time Trials | 13; Practice | 14; Practice | 15; Practice | 16; Practice | 17; Practice | 18; Time Trials |
| 19; Bump Day | 20 | 21 | 22 | 23; Carb Day | 24; Mini-Marathon | 25; Parade |
| 26; Indy 500 | 27; Memorial Day | 28 | 29 | 30 | 31 | |

| Color | Notes |
|---|---|
| Green | Practice |
| Dark Blue | Time trials |
| Silver | Race day |
| Red | Rained out* |
| Blank | No track activity |

* Includes days where track
activity was significantly
limited due to rain

ROP — denotes Rookie
Orientation Program

== Time trials ==
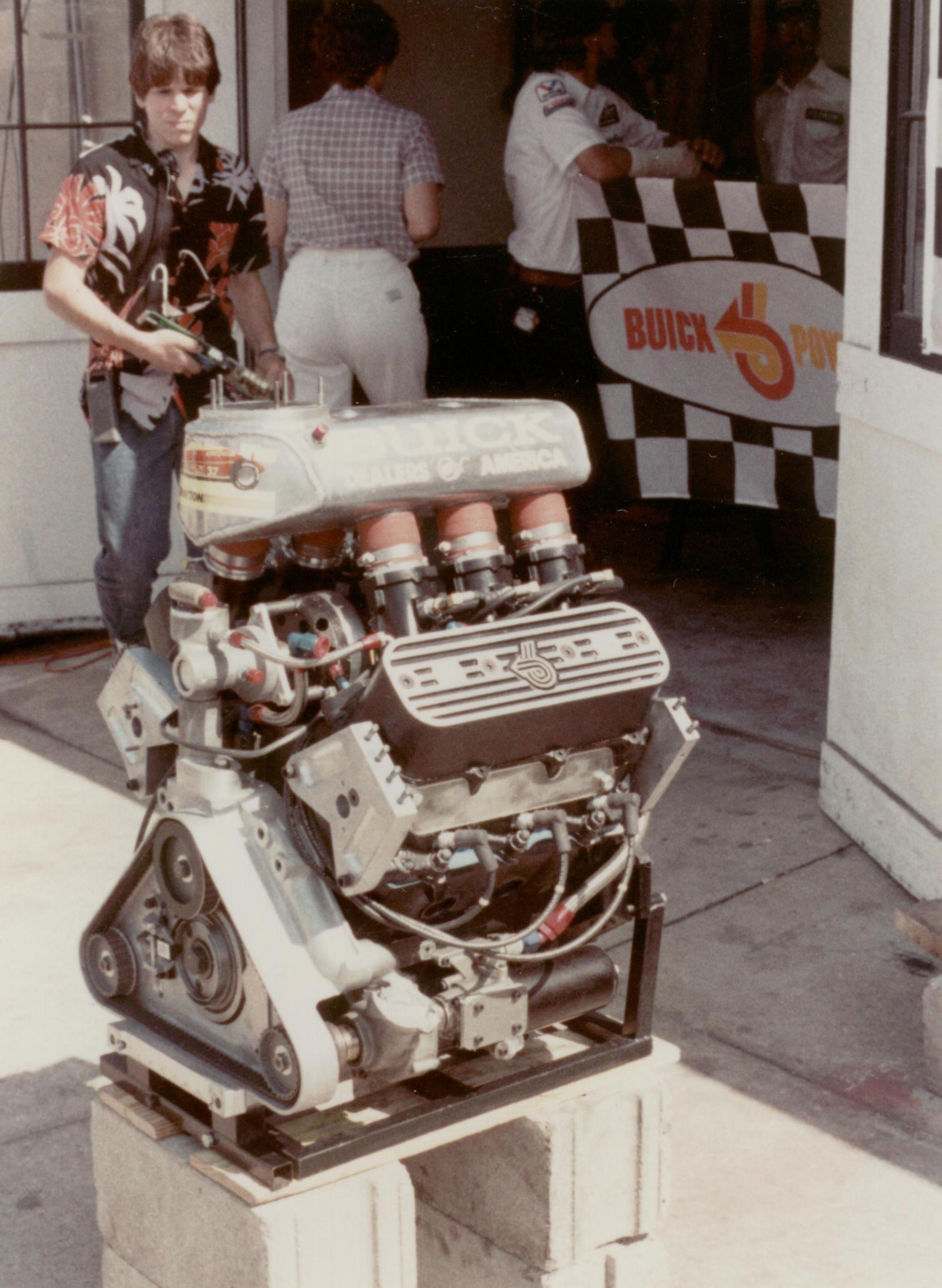
The Buick V-6 Indy car engine

=== Pole Day – Saturday May 11 ===
Pole day was sunny and warm, with temperatures in the low 80s. Mario Andretti (214.285 mph) and Bobby Rahal (214.183 mph) were the fastest cars in practice, and were early favorites for the pole position.

Qualifying began promptly at 11 a.m. The first car to take to the track was Scott Brayton driving one of the Buick V-6 stock block-powered cars. He set new one-lap and four-lap track records, as well as track records for stock block engines. His four-lap average of 212.354 mph tentatively put him on pole position.

- Lap 1 – 42.490 seconds, 211.815 mph (new 1-lap track record)
- Lap 2 – 42.216 seconds, 213.189 mph (new 1-lap track record)
- Lap 3 – 42.017 seconds, 214.199 mph (new 1-lap track record)
- Lap 4 – 42.905 seconds, 210.256 mph
- Total – 2:49.523, 212.354 mph (new 4-lap track record)

Brayton's final lap dropped off due to transmission trouble. Not to be upstaged, less than twenty minutes later, Pancho Carter took to the track, also with one of the Buick V-6 engines.

- Lap 1 – 42.351 seconds, 212.510 mph
- Lap 2 – 42.309 seconds, 213.721 mph
- Lap 3 – 42.222 seconds, 213.159 mph
- Lap 4 – 42.464 seconds, 211.944 mph
- Total – 2:49.346, 212.533 mph (new 4-lap track record)

Carter could not eclipse Brayton's one-lap track record, but his run was more consistent. Carter's four-lap average of 212.533 mph was faster overall than Brayton, and itself was a new four-lap track record. Carter took the top spot by a mere 0.177 seconds. As a result, in a mostly rare situation, the one-lap and four-lap track records were thus held by two different drivers. Carter clinched the pole position, and completed a 1st–2nd sweep for the Buicks on the starting grid. Only a half-hour had passed, but the Buicks had already established their dominance of time trials. After the record-setting run, Brayton picked up the sponsorship of Hardee's during the week.

With the pole position now out-of-reach, the rest of the field battled to see who would fill out the front row. Emerson Fittipaldi (211.322 mph) put himself tentatively in third position, but Mario Andretti (211.576 mph) later bumped him down. At 1:13 p.m., Bobby Rahal, the last driver with a legitimate shot, turned in a run of 211.818 mph, securing the outside of the front row.

A busy day saw 27 cars qualify. Rick Mears returned from his 1984 leg injuries to qualify 10th. Danny Sullivan put his car in the field in 8th. No driver from 1911 to 1984 had ever won the race from 8th starting position, and it was often nicknamed the dreaded "8-ball spot".

=== Second Day – Sunday May 12 ===
Only two cars, Steve Chassey and Chet Fillip, made qualifying attempts, both late in the day. At the end of the first weekend of time trials, the field was filled to 29 cars.

=== Third Day – Saturday May 18 ===
The second weekend of time trials saw cooler weather, and better conditions. Rookie Raul Boesel was the first car to take to the track, and put in a solid run of 206.498 mph.

Late in the day, George Snider continued the trend of stock block engines, putting a Foyt V-6 in the field. In doing so, the field was filled to 33 cars. John Paul Jr. squeezed in a qualifying run between his IMSA commitments, and bumped Derek Daly from the field.

Tony Bettenhausen Jr. bumped out Chet Fillip, who earlier in the day, had wrecked his back-up car, leaving him on the sidelines for the rest of the month. The day ended as Jim Crawford bumped out Kevin Cogan.

=== Bump Day – Sunday May 19 ===
The final day of time trials opened with Steve Chassey on the bubble, and about nine cars looking to make the field. Kevin Cogan got in his backup car, and easily bumped his way back into the field to open the afternoon. After Cogan's run, the track went mostly quiet, as drivers awaited better conditions.

Three-time winner Johnny Rutherford was now on the bubble, the second year in a row he was in danger of not qualifying. At about 5 p.m., Derek Daly (207.548 mph) bumped out Rutherford. A few minutes later, Rutherford got in a backup car, and at 208.254 mph, easily put himself back in the field. Rutherford bumped out Michael Roe in the process.

With a half hour left in the day, Pete Halsmer was on the bubble. He survived an attempt by Tom Bigelow, but Rich Vogler succeeded in bumping him out. Tony Bettenhausen Jr. (204.824 mph) was now on the bubble. Michael Roe tried twice to bump him out, but fell short on both attempts.

== Carburetion Day ==
The final practice was held on Thursday May 23. All 33 qualified car plus first alternate Pete Halsmer took practice laps on a sunny, cool afternoon. During the two-hour session, Mario Andretti (209.937 mph) turned the fastest lap. No incidents were reported.

=== Pit Stop Contest ===
The 9th annual Miller Pit Stop Contest were held on Thursday May 23. The top four race qualifiers and their respective pit crews were automatically eligible: Pancho Carter, Scott Brayton, Bobby Rahal, and Mario Andretti. However, Rahal declined the invitation. Emerson Fittipaldi (who qualified 5th) tentatively took that empty spot. Four additional spots would be available for the contest during preliminaries.

Geoff Brabham, Roberto Guerrero, Arie Luyendyk, Howdy Holmes qualified for the contest during preliminaries held May 14–16. Don Whittington was named the first alternate. Michael Andretti, the 1984 Pit Stop Contest winner, was unable to participate due to car damage. Danny Sullivan's car was dismantled at the time, and he was unable to take part in the preliminaries. Sullivan's team lobbied the officials, and they agreed to add Sullivan to the contest as "promoter's option". Emerson Fittipaldi reportedly withdrew, and eight finalists competed in the elimination round.

The eliminations would consist of two rounds. The preliminary round would feature two teams at a time, racing head-to-head against the clock. The two fastest teams overall - regardless of the individual head-to-head results - would advance to the final round. Rules required crews to change the two right-side tires and simulate a fuel hook-up. The pairing were as follows: Carter vs. Holmes, Brayton vs. Luyendyk, Andretti vs. Guerrero, and Brabham vs. Sullivan. Danny Sullivan of Penske Racing and led by chief mechanic Chuck Sprague, reached the final, along with Howdy Holmes of Forsythe Racing.

In the final round, Holmes actually registered a faster time (11.734 seconds), but his team was assessed a 10-second penalty for an air hose infraction (the hose wrapped around the rear wing). Sullivan was declared the winner, his first victory in the event, and Penske's fourth win overall.

Preliminary Round
| Rank | Car No. | Driver | Team |
|---|---|---|---|
| 1 | 5 | Danny Sullivan | Penske Racing |
| 2 | 33 | Howdy Holmes | Forsythe Racing |
| 3 | 6 | Pancho Carter | Galles Racing |
| 4 | 37 | Scott Brayton | Brayton Racing |
| 5 | 61 | Arie Luyendyk | Provimi Racing |
| 6 | 3 | Mario Andretti | Newman/Haas Racing |
| 7 | 9 | Roberto Guerrero | Team Cotter |
| 8 | 7 | Geoff Brabham | Galles Racing |
| WD | 40 | Emerson Fittipaldi | Patrick Racing |

| Finals |
| 5 | Danny Sullivan (Penske Racing) | 11.742 |
| 33 | Howdy Holmes (Forsythe Racing) | 21.734 |

== Starting grid ==
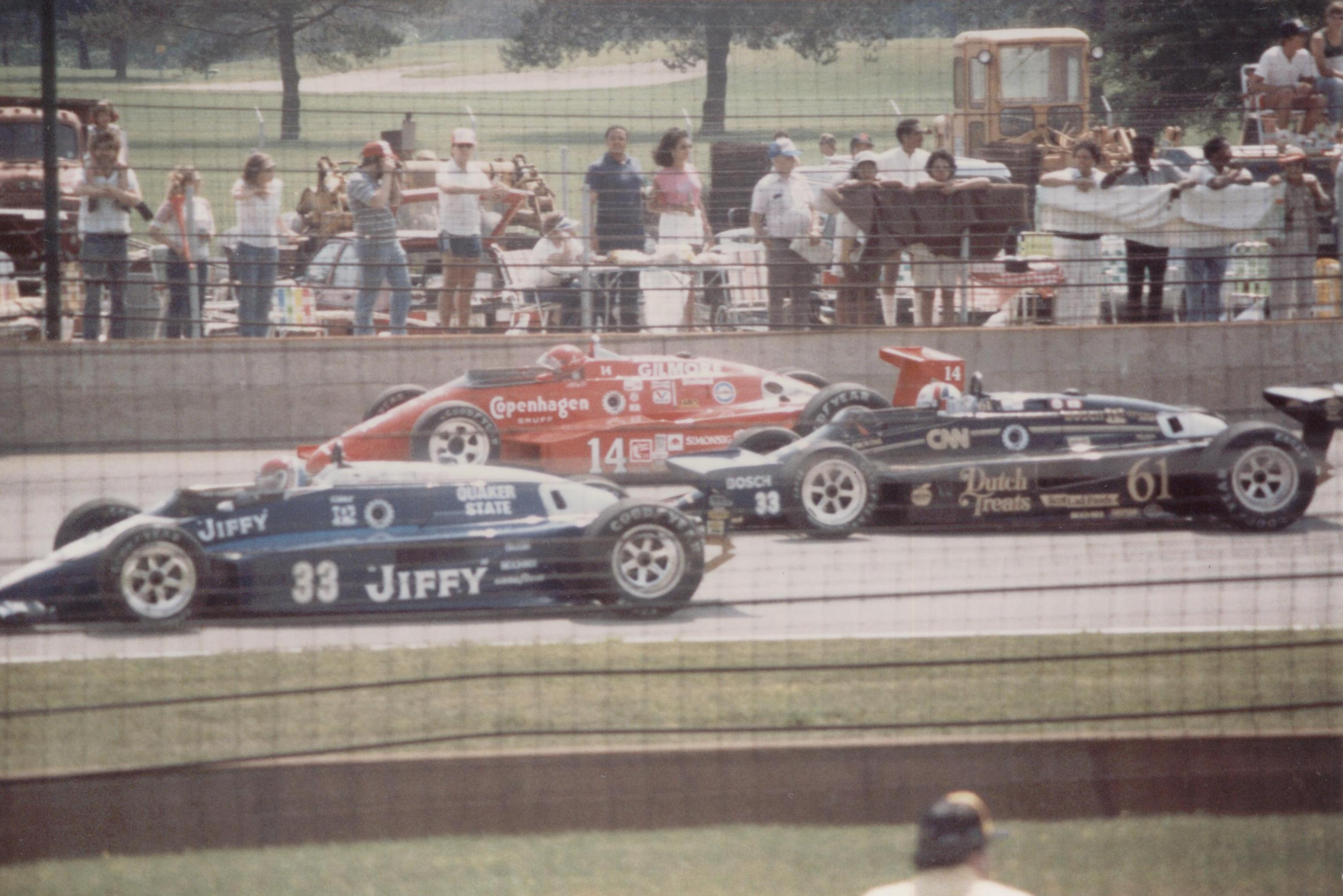
The cars of the seventh row: #33 Howdy Holmes, #61 Arie Luyendyk, #14 A. J. Foyt

| Row | Inside | Middle | Outside |
|---|---|---|---|
| 1 | (United States) 6 - Pancho Carter | (United States) 37 - Scott Brayton | (United States) 10 - Bobby Rahal |
| 2 | (United States) 3 - Mario Andretti W | (Brazil) 40 - Emerson Fittipaldi | (United States) 20 - Don Whittington |
| 3 | (United States) 11 - Al Unser W | (United States) 5 - Danny Sullivan | (Australia) 7 - Geoff Brabham |
| 4 | (United States) 1 - Rick Mears W | (United States) 30 - Al Unser Jr. | (United States) 12 - Bill Whittington |
| 5 | (United States) 2 - Tom Sneva W | (United States) 22 - Dick Simon | (United States) 99 - Michael Andretti |
| 6 | (Colombia) 9 - Roberto Guerrero | (United States) 25 - Danny Ongais | (Mexico) 55 - Josele Garza |
| 7 | (United States) 33 - Howdy Holmes | (Netherlands) 61 - Arie Luyendyk R | (United States) 14 - A. J. Foyt W |
| 8 | (United States) 98 - Ed Pimm R | (Brazil) 23 - Raul Boesel R | (United States) 43 - John Paul Jr. R |
| 9 | (United States) 84 - Chip Ganassi | (United States) 76 - Johnny Parsons | (United Kingdom) 34 - Jim Crawford R |
| 10 | (United States) 44 - George Snider | (United States) 97 - Tony Bettenhausen Jr. | (United States) 21 - Johnny Rutherford W |
| 11 | (Republic of Ireland) 29 - Derek Daly | (United States) 18 - Kevin Cogan | (United States) 60 - Rich Vogler R |

=== Alternates ===
- First alternate: Pete Halsmer (#59) – Bumped
- Second alternate: Michael Roe R (#71) – Bumped

=== Failed to qualify ===
- Steve Chassey (#56) – Bumped
- Chet Fillip (#38, #39) – Bumped; crashed in practice
- Tom Bigelow (#24, #42, #50) – Incomplete qualifying runs
- Dennis Firestone (#36) – Incomplete qualifying runs
- Jerry Karl (#51, #62) – Practiced; did not attempt to qualify
- Phil Krueger (#50, #51) – Practiced; did not attempt to qualify
- Mike Nish R (#41) – Practiced; did not attempt to qualify
- Dick Ferguson (#69) – Practiced; did not attempt to qualify
- Herm Johnson (#8) – Crashed in practice, injured
- Jacques Villeneuve (#76) – Crashed in practice, injured; replaced by Johnny Parsons
- Gordon Johncock W (#20) – Retired May 10; replaced by Don Whittington
- Randy Lanier (#57) – Passed rookie test; not approved to compete by USAC

== Race summary ==
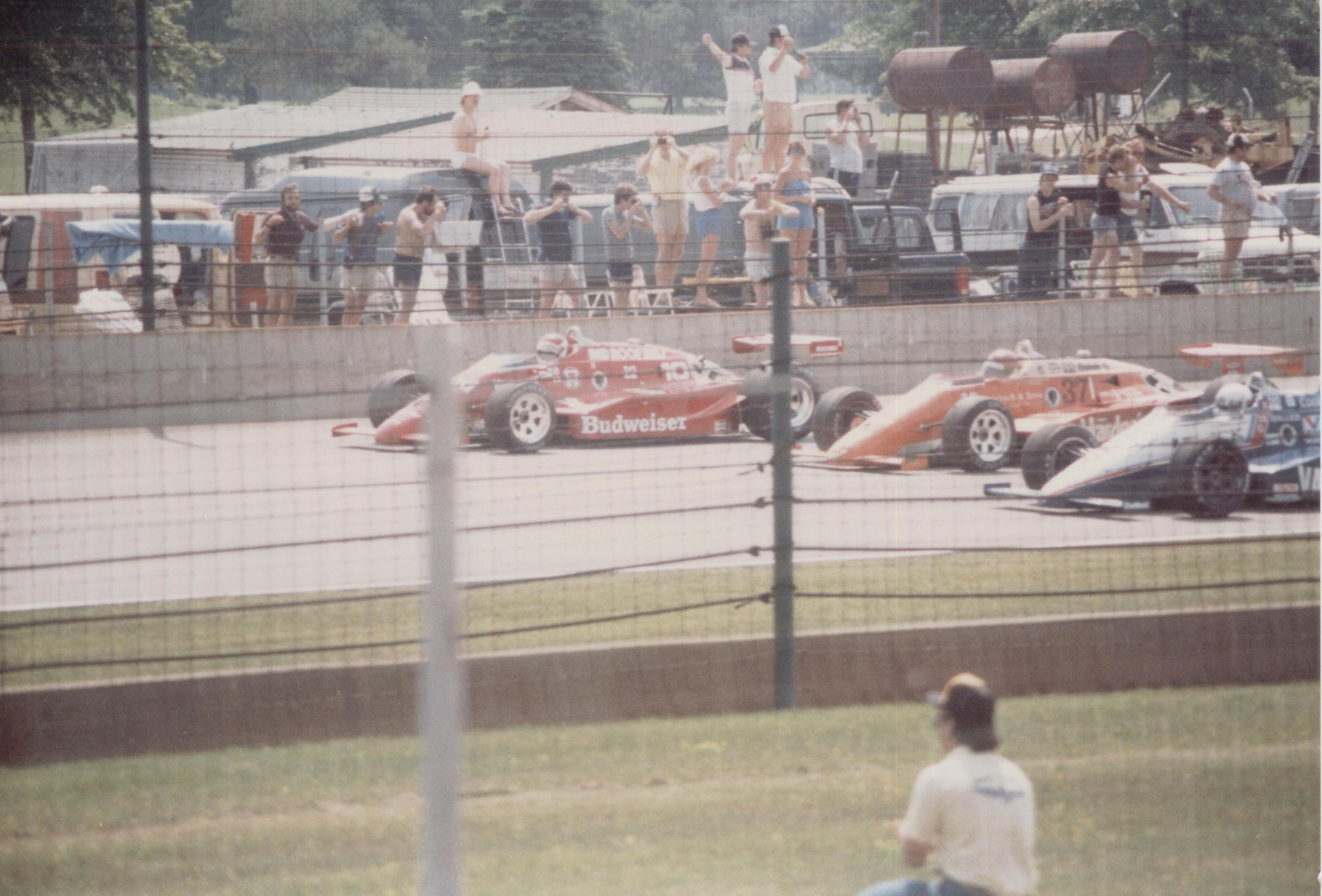
The front row (L to R): #10 Bobby Rahal on the outside, #37 Scott Brayton in the middle, #6 Pancho Carter on the pole position.

=== Start ===
Going into the race, the top two qualifiers, Pancho Carter and Scott Brayton were considered underdogs, due to reliability issues with the Buick engine. Mario Andretti emerged as the race day favorite.

Race day dawned sunny and warm. Mary F. Hulman gave the command to start engines just before 11 a.m., and the field pulled away for the pace laps. At the green flag, Bobby Rahal got the jump from the outside of the front row, and took the lead into turn 1. Brayton settled into second, but polesitter Carter slipped back to fourth. By turn three, Mario Andretti had picked off Brayton for second, and Rahal went on to lead the first lap.

In the first few laps, Carter slid down the standings, and on lap 6, he pulled into the pits with a failed oil pump. He mentioned on the radio network interview that the pump that failed was not a Buick part, rather it was from a Cosworth engine. He became the second polesitter to finish last (33rd) after Cliff Woodbury in 1929.

Bobby Rahal led the first 14 laps. On lap 15, George Snider and Josele Garza both suffered blown engines simultaneously, bringing out the first caution. Mario Andretti had a faster pit stop, and emerged on the track as the new leader on lap 16.

=== First half ===
The Buicks' day came to an end on lap 19 when Scott Brayton stopped on the track with a blown engine from a cracked cylinder wall. After keeping a close margin to Andretti, Bobby Rahal went to the pits on lap 52 with a turbocharger wastegate problem. After several long pit stops, Rahal eventually dropped out with 84 laps.

Mario Andretti continued to dominate, with Danny Sullivan now in second. Also, high in contention was Emerson Fittipaldi, Al Unser Jr. and Al Unser Sr.

On lap 61, A. J. Foyt came into the pits with a poor-handling car in 20th place. After a heated exchange with his crew, it was determined that the front wing was broken. An angry Foyt stormed around the car, bumped into the fueler, fuel spilled, and fire started in the pit area. The fire was quickly doused. Foyt was out of the race just four laps short of the 10,000-mile career mark at the Speedway. Al Unser Sr. was penalized for running over his air hose, which dropped him down the standings, Al Unser Jr., who was in the top five, dropped out on lap 91 with an engine failure.

=== Second half ===
At the halfway point, only four cars remained on the lead lap. In order, they were Mario Andretti, Emerson Fittipaldi, Tom Sneva, and Danny Sullivan. After green flag pit stops, Sullivan moved into 2nd place by being the only driver among them to take a fuel-only stop.

==== Danny Sullivan spin ====
Shortly after the halfway point, Danny Sullivan got a radio call from his crew, but he misunderstood the message. He thought they said there were only 12 laps to go. In reality, there were still over 80 laps remaining. Sullivan quickly turned up the turbocharger boost, and started closing in on Andretti for the lead. On lap 120 (the 300 mile mark), Sullivan pulled to the inside down the front stretch, and took the lead going into turn one. Andretti held his ground, forcing Sullivan to make the pass down below the yellow line in the somewhat rough and flat apron. Suddenly, the car slipped as Sullivan came off the apron, and the back end snapped loose. Out of control, Sullivan's car began a counterclockwise 360° spin directly in front of Andretti in the south short chute. Andretti pinched his car down to the inside, and slipped by unscathed. Meanwhile, Sullivan spun completely around, did not hit anything, and the engine stalled for an instant. When the tire smoked cleared, Sullivan noticed he was pointing in the correct direction, and he put the car in gear. The engine caught, and Sullivan pulled away under power to resume the race.

The spin was immediately considered one of the most electrifying moments in Indy history, both for Andretti's ability to avoid Sullivan's spinning car, and for Sullivan's recovery from the spin. Sullivan considered it 50/50 skill and "dumb luck" that he emerged from the spin unscathed. Andretti's split-second decision to veer to the inside (the more difficult move, pinching his own car down) was a result of his experience from a very similar incident two years earlier. In the 1983 race, Andretti was faced with a nearly identical situation when Johnny Parsons spun in front of him coming out of turn one. Andretti tried to avoid Parsons' car to the outside, the two cars collided, and Andretti crashed hard into the concrete wall.

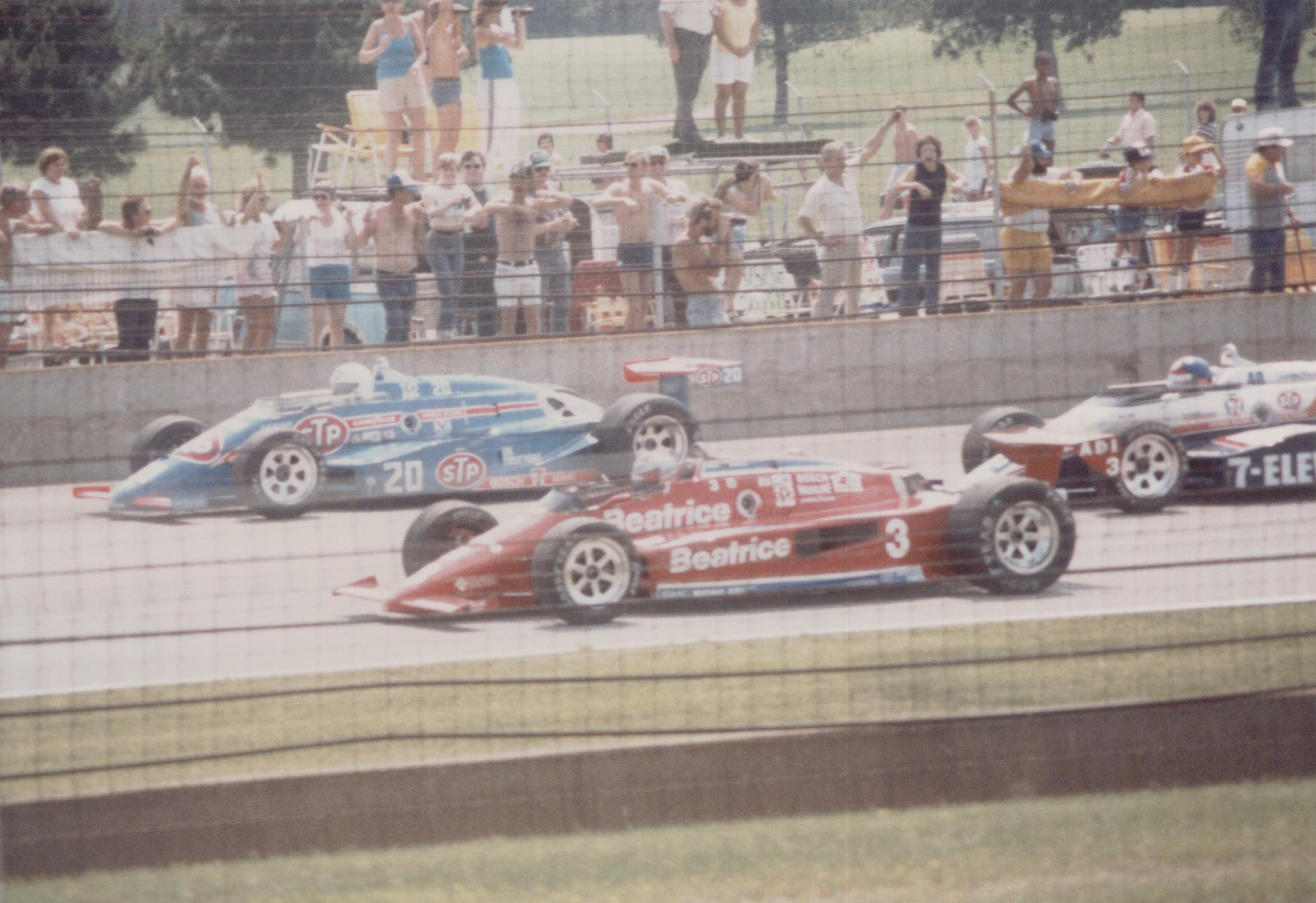
#3 Mario Andretti, #40 Emerson Fittipaldi, #20 Don Whittington

The yellow flag immediately came out, and both Sullivan and Andretti made pit stops for tires and fuel. Their stops briefly put Emerson Fittipaldi into the lead. When Fittipaldi pitted the next time around, Andretti moved back into first. Tom Sneva was now second and Sullivan third. Several lapped cars began ahead of the race leaders on the subsequent restart. Going into turn 1 on lap 124, Howdy Holmes drifted down into the rear quarter of Rich Vogler. Vogler was sent hard into the wall, skidding in front of the leaders. Andretti avoided the wreck, but Sneva locked his brakes and spun wide in front of Sullivan, who slipped by unscathed. Sneva hit the wall, but was not injured. Vogler, with a concussion and two cuts above his eyelid, was airlifted to Methodist Hospital for further treatment.

After the cleanup, the race again reverted to Mario Andretti leading and Danny Sullivan second. On lap 140, Sullivan tried for the second time to get by Andretti, in exactly the same place as 20 laps before. This time he made the pass cleanly and started to pull away.

Danny Sullivan started to pull away at will in the final 50 laps. Mario Andretti was starting to struggle, and was passed by Emerson Fittipaldi for second place for several laps.

=== Finish ===
Mario Andretti caught a break on lap 175 when John Paul Jr. crashed in turn 2. Paul lost a wheel, and spun nearly head-on into the outside wall near the Turn Two Suites. He was not seriously injured. Andretti, meanwhile, bunched up behind Sullivan, and made the race close over the final laps.

After being a factor nearly all afternoon, Emerson Fittipaldi dropped out of the race with low oil pressure and a broken fuel line with only 12 laps to go.

On lap 192, Bill Whittington crashed in turn 3. The crash set up a restart with three laps to go. Andretti lined up three cars behind Sullivan, and as the green came out, he was able to quickly pick off both lapped cars. With two laps to go, Sullivan had a comfortable 2.4-second lead. Andretti was not able to close the gap, and Sullivan won his first (and only) Indy 500 by 2.477 seconds over Mario Andretti.

Andretti matched his best finish in the race besides his win in 1969. Andretti was disappointed in an interview stating: "Second sucks. This was my best chance to win since my 1969 victory. We got a lot out of the car but it was not good enough. I left Danny plenty of room down on the apron and he just spun out. I picked the way to go and it happened to have been the right way. I knew he was cooked when he went down the apron but...he was just lucky that's all."

On his victory, Sullivan later stated in 1995:

"Mario and I are best friends, but he was so annoyed by the defeat that he didn't talk to me for a year. He would high-five anybody but me for several months. It annoyed him because he felt like he had it won. I had probably the best car of the field and so did he but ultimately I came out on top."

== Box score ==
| Finish | Start | No | Name | Chassis | Engine | Qual | Laps | Status |
|---|---|---|---|---|---|---|---|---|
| 1 | 8 | 5 | (United States) Danny Sullivan | March 85C | Cosworth DFX | 210.298 | 200 | 152.982 mph |
| 2 | 4 | 3 | (United States) Mario Andretti W | Lola T900 | Cosworth DFX | 211.576 | 200 | +2.477 seconds |
| 3 | 16 | 9 | (Colombia) Roberto Guerrero | March 85C | Cosworth DFX | 208.061 | 200 | +11.59 seconds |
| 4 | 7 | 11 | (United States) Al Unser W | March 85C | Cosworth DFX | 210.523 | 199 | Flagged |
| 5 | 26 | 76 | (United States) Johnny Parsons | March 85C | Cosworth DFX | 205.778 | 198 | Flagged |
| 6 | 30 | 21 | (United States) Johnny Rutherford W | March 85C | Cosworth DFX | 208.254 | 198 | Flagged |
| 7 | 20 | 61 | (Netherlands) Arie Luyendyk R | Lola T900 | Cosworth DFX | 206.004 | 198 | Flagged |
| 8 | 15 | 99 | (United States) Michael Andretti | Lola T900 | Cosworth DFX | 208.185 | 196 | Flagged |
| 9 | 22 | 98 | (United States) Ed Pimm R | Eagle 85 | Cosworth DFX | 205.723 | 195 | Flagged |
| 10 | 19 | 33 | (United States) Howdy Holmes | Lola T900 | Cosworth DFX | 206.372 | 194 | Flagged |
| 11 | 32 | 18 | (United States) Kevin Cogan | March 85C | Cosworth DFX | 206.367 | 191 | Flagged |
| 12 | 31 | 29 | (Republic of Ireland) Derek Daly | Lola T900 | Cosworth DFX | 207.548 | 189 | Flagged |
| 13 | 5 | 40 | (Brazil) Emerson Fittipaldi | March 85C | Cosworth DFX | 211.322 | 188 | Fuel Line |
| 14 | 12 | 12 | (United States) Bill Whittington | March 85C | Cosworth DFX | 209.006 | 183 | Crash T3 |
| 15 | 24 | 43 | (United States) John Paul Jr. R | March 85C | Cosworth DFX | 206.340 | 164 | Crash T2 |
| 16 | 27 | 34 | (United Kingdom) Jim Crawford R | Lola T900 | Cosworth DFX | 205.525 | 142 | Electrical |
| 17 | 17 | 25 | (United States) Danny Ongais | March 85C | Cosworth DFX | 207.220 | 141 | Engine |
| 18 | 23 | 23 | (Brazil) Raul Boesel R | March 85C | Cosworth DFX | 206.498 | 134 | Radiator |
| 19 | 9 | 7 | (Australia) Geoff Brabham | March 85C | Cosworth DFX | 210.074 | 130 | Engine |
| 20 | 13 | 2 | (United States) Tom Sneva W | Eagle 85 | Cosworth DFX | 208.927 | 123 | Crash T1 |
| 21 | 10 | 1 | (United States) Rick Mears W | March 85C | Cosworth DFX | 209.796 | 122 | Linkage |
| 22 | 25 | 84 | (United States) Chip Ganassi | March 85C | Cosworth DFX | 206.104 | 121 | Fuel Line |
| 23 | 33 | 60 | (United States) Rich Vogler R | March 85C | Cosworth DFX | 205.653 | 119 | Crash T1 |
| 24 | 6 | 20 | (United States) Don Whittington | March 85C | Cosworth DFX | 210.992 | 97 | Engine |
| 25 | 11 | 30 | (United States) Al Unser Jr. | Lola T900 | Cosworth DFX | 209.215 | 91 | Engine |
| 26 | 14 | 22 | (United States) Dick Simon | March 85C | Cosworth DFX | 208.536 | 86 | Oil Pressure |
| 27 | 3 | 10 | (United States) Bobby Rahal | March 85C | Cosworth DFX | 211.818 | 84 | Waste Gate |
| 28 | 21 | 14 | (United States) A. J. Foyt W | March 85C | Cosworth DFX | 205.783 | 62 | Front Wing |
| 29 | 29 | 97 | (United States) Tony Bettenhausen Jr. | Lola T900 | Cosworth DFX | 204.824 | 31 | Wheel Bearing |
| 30 | 2 | 37 | (United States) Scott Brayton | March 85C | Buick V-6 | 212.354 | 19 | Cylinder Wall |
| 31 | 18 | 55 | (Mexico) Josele Garza | March 85C | Cosworth DFX | 206.677 | 15 | Engine |
| 32 | 28 | 44 | (United States) George Snider | March 85C | Chevy V-6 | 205.455 | 13 | Engine |
| 33 | 1 | 6 | (United States) Pancho Carter | March 85C | Buick V-6 | 212.583 | 6 | Oil Pump |

W Former Indianapolis 500 winner

R Indianapolis 500 Rookie

All cars utilized Goodyear tires.

=== Race statistics ===
Lap Leaders
| Laps | Leader |
|---|---|
| 1–14 | Bobby Rahal |
| 15 | Scott Brayton |
| 16–48 | Mario Andretti |
| 49–50 | Emerson Fittipaldi |
| 51–57 | Danny Sullivan |
| 58–73 | Mario Andretti |
| 74 | Emerson Fittipaldi |
| 75–104 | Mario Andretti |
| 105–109 | Emerson Fittipaldi |
| 110–119 | Mario Andretti |
| 120–121 | Emerson Fittipaldi |
| 122–139 | Mario Andretti |
| 140–200 | Danny Sullivan |

Total laps led
| Driver | Laps |
|---|---|
| Mario Andretti | 107 |
| Danny Sullivan | 67 |
| Bobby Rahal | 14 |
| Emerson Fittipaldi | 11 |
| Scott Brayton | 1 |

Cautions: 8 for 41 laps
| Laps | Reason |
|---|---|
| 15–18 | George Snider blown engine |
| 22–28 | Scott Brayton oil leak |
| 74–77 | Derek Daly tow-in |
| 120–121 | Danny Sullivan spin southchute |
| 124–133 | Tom Sneva, Rich Vogler crash turn 1 |
| 146–149 | Danny Ongais tow-in |
| 170–175 | John Paul Jr. crash turn 2 |
| 193–196 | Bill Whittington crash turn 4 |

== Legacy ==
The "Spin and Win" result went down in Indy 500 lore as one of the most famous moments in the history of the race. Mario Andretti considered the 1985 race his "best chance to win," and his subsequent failure added to the Andretti curse. A disappointed Andretti refused to speak with Sullivan for almost a year after the race. In post-race interviews, the experienced Andretti claimed he baited the younger Sullivan during the pass, and deliberately pinched him down to the apron.

Sam Posey reflected the win as a "changing of the guard" on the Indy car circuit, as the young 'hot-shot' Sullivan beat the established and long-experienced Andretti. Likewise, Indy legend A. J. Foyt was not a factor, and Johnny Rutherford, despite a strong finish, struggled to qualify.

The victory thrust Danny Sullivan into superstar status on the CART circuit. He guest-starred on an episode of Miami Vice ("Florence Italy") as well as a soap opera. He would go on to finish 4th in the 1985 points standings, and would win a CART championship in 1988.

== Broadcasting ==
=== Radio ===
The race was carried live on the IMS Radio Network. Paul Page served as the chief announcer for the ninth year. It was Page's twelfth year overall as part of the network crew. Lou Palmer reported from victory lane. The 1985 broadcast marked the final time the network featured exclusive live coverage of the race. The following year, ABC Sports would begin covering the race live on network television. Thus, Palmer's live interview with the winner in 1985 was the final time the network was granted exclusive live access to the winner's first interview in victory lane. Veteran Luke Walton introduced the starting command during the pre-race, but did not report during the race itself.

Gordon Johncock, who abruptly retired from driving during the month, joined Rodger Ward and the broadcast featured two driver experts. In addition, the reporting location on the backstretch was eliminated, due to the increasing speed of the cars, and the fact that the Turn 2 and Turn 3 reporters had a sufficient view of the straightaway. Bob Forbes spent the first segments of the race reporting from the center pits, then in the second half of the race, concentrated on the garage area and hospital.

Doug Zink, who had joined the network in 1966, left the crew. Howdy Bell took over Zink's vacant spot in turn 2, which was also Bell's longtime former position. The number of pit reporters was reduced back to four, and Sally Larvick was reassigned back to interviews and features.

This would be the final 500 in broadcasting (radio or television) for Rodger Ward, as well as the final appearance for Ron Carrell as a turn reporter. Carrell's final race reporting from turn one included his call of Danny Sullivan's famous spin on lap 120. In addition, the turn one vantage point was moved from the deck of the Southwest Vista to a platform suspended from the E Stand Penthouse.

Indianapolis Motor Speedway Radio Network
| Booth Announcers | Turn Reporters | Pit/garage reporters |
|---|---|---|
| Chief Announcer: Paul Page; Driver expert: Rodger Ward; Driver expert: Gordon Johncock; Statistician: John DeCamp; Historian: Donald Davidson | Turn 1: Ron Carrell; Turn 2: Howdy Bell; Backstretch: not used Turn 3: Larry Henry; Turn 4: Bob Jenkins | Luke Walton (pre-race); Sally Larvick (interviews) |
| Chief Announcer: Paul Page; Driver expert: Rodger Ward; Driver expert: Gordon Johncock; Statistician: John DeCamp; Historian: Donald Davidson | Turn 1: Ron Carrell; Turn 2: Howdy Bell; Backstretch: not used Turn 3: Larry Henry; Turn 4: Bob Jenkins | Jerry Baker (north pits); Chuck Marlowe (center pits); Bob Forbes (center pits/garages); Lou Palmer (south pits) |

=== Television ===
The race was carried in the United States on ABC Sports on a same-day tape delay basis. This would be the final time the race was shown in tape delay, as in 1986, the race would move to a live broadcast. Jim McKay served as anchor, and the separate "host" position was eliminated, in favor of McKay serving as both host and announcer.

With only five individuals serving as on-air talent, it was ABC's smallest crew of the decade. The race earned a rating of 9.7 (18 share), the lowest such rating in the tape delay/prime time era. Less than three months later on August 19, 1985, ABC Sports signed an initial three-year deal, long-awaited by auto racing fans, to cover the Indianapolis 500 live flag-to-flag starting in 1986. The 1985 race would be the final time Jim McKay would anchor the broadcast. For 1986, he would be moved to the host position.

The broadcast has re-aired numerous times on ESPN Classic since 2000.

ABC Television
| Booth Announcers | Pit/garage reporters |
|---|---|
| Host/Announcer: Jim McKay; Color: Sam Posey | Bill Flemming; Jack Arute; Jim Lampley |

=== Quotes ===
"The Indianapolis 500 has a new champion, as Danny Sullivan has won the 69th Indianapolis 500." – Paul Page described the finish of the race for the Indianapolis Motor Speedway Radio Network

"The Old American Hero will lose the race [Mario Andretti], the New American Hero is Daniel John Sullivan III of Louisville, Kentucky who has won the Indianapolis 500." – Jim McKay called the finish during the ABC Sports broadcast.

== 1984–85 USAC Gold Crown Championship ==
1984–85 USAC Championship Car season
- USAC Gold Crown Championship

Season
- Races: 1

Awards
- National champion: (United States) Danny Sullivan

The 1984–85 USAC Gold Crown Championship season consisted of one sanctioned race. The schedule was based on a split-calendar, beginning in June 1984 and running through May 1985. Starting in 1981, USAC scaled back their participation in top-level Indy car racing, and ultimately ceased sanctioning races outside of the Indianapolis 500 following their 1983–84 season. Subsequently, the Gold Crown Championship would consist of only one event annually; the winner of the Indianapolis 500 would be the de facto Gold Crown champion, as it was their lone points-paying event. The preeminent national championship season was instead sanctioned by CART, and the Indy 500 paid championship points separately (on a different scale) toward the CART championship as well.

Danny Sullivan, by virtue of winning the 1985 Indianapolis 500, also won the 1984–85 USAC Championship.

=== Final points standings (Top five) ===
| Pos | Driver | INDY (United States) | Pts |
|---|---|---|---|
| 1 | (United States) Danny Sullivan | 1 | 1000 |
| 2 | (United States) Mario Andretti | 2 | 800 |
| 3 | (Colombia) Roberto Guerrero | 3 | 700 |
| 4 | (United States) Al Unser | 4 | 600 |
| 5 | (United States) Johnny Parsons | 5 | 500 |

== Gallery ==
1985 Oldsmobile Cutlass Calais pace car

== Notes ==
=== Works cited ===
- 1985 Indianapolis 500 Day-By-Day Trackside Report For the Media
- Indianapolis 500 History: Race & All-Time Stats – Official Site
- 1985 Indianapolis 500 Radio Broadcast, Indianapolis Motor Speedway Radio Network

| 1984 Indianapolis 500; Rick Mears | 1985 Indianapolis 500; Danny Sullivan | 1986 Indianapolis 500; Bobby Rahal |
