= Pancho Carter =

American racing driver (born 1950)

Duane "Pancho" Carter
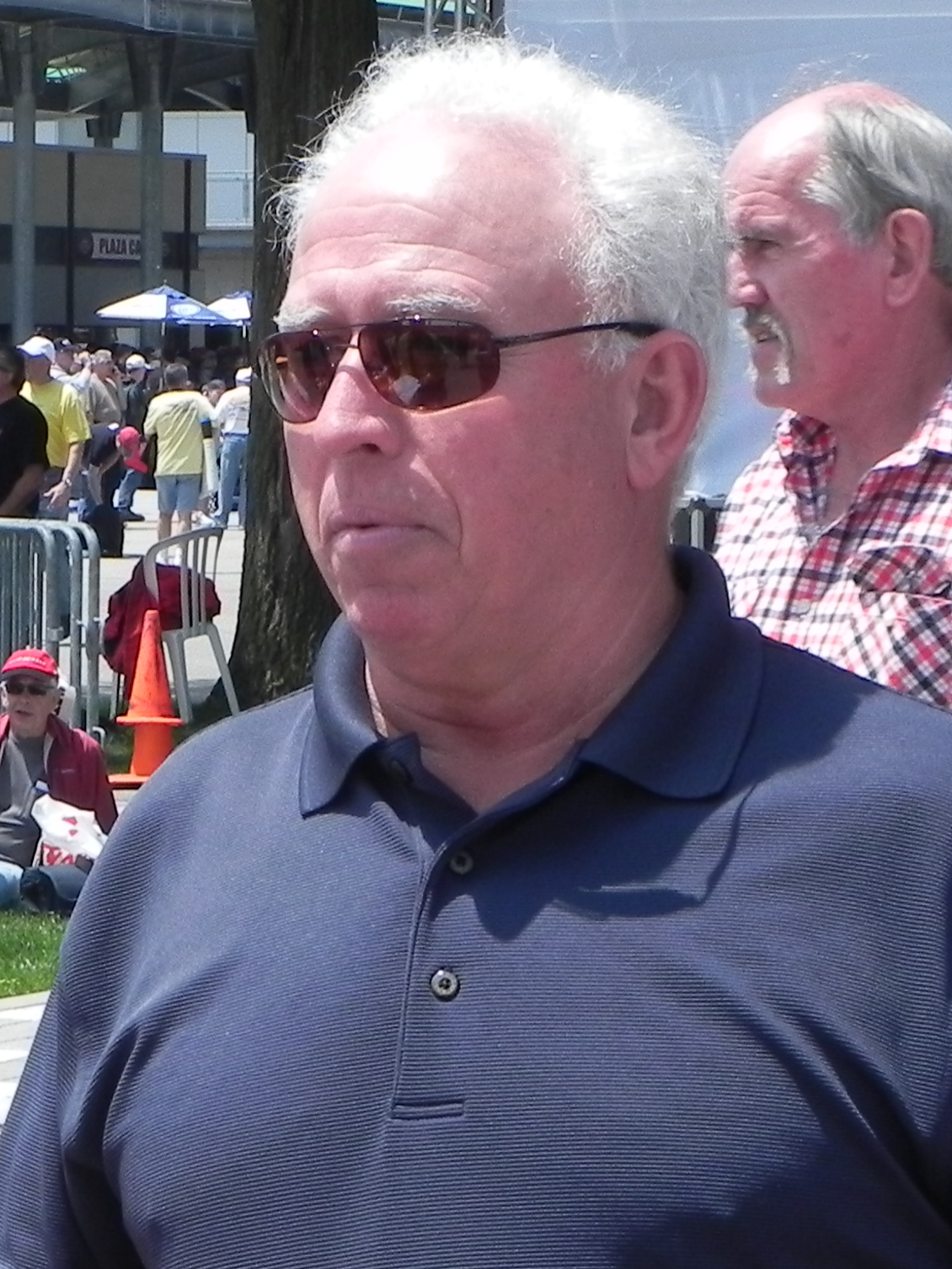
- Carter at the 2011 Indianapolis 500
- Born: Duane Claude Carter Jr. June 11, 1950 (age 76) Racine, Wisconsin, U.S.

Championship titles
- USAC Midget (1972); USAC Sprint Car (1974, 1976); USAC Silver Crown (1978); Major victories Michigan 500 (1981)

Champ Car career
- 165 races run over 20 years
- Best finish: 3rd (1981)
- First race: 1974 Indianapolis 500 (Indianapolis)
- Last race: 1992 Michigan 500 (Michigan)
- First win: 1981 Michigan 500 (Michigan)
Wins	Podiums	Poles
1	14	1

NASCAR Cup Series career
- 14 races run over 6 years
- Best finish: 38th (1986)
- First race: 1985 Southern 500 (Darlington)
- Last race: 1995 UAW-GM Teamwork 500 (Pocono)
Wins	Top tens	Poles
0	0	0

Duane Claude Carter Jr. (born June 11, 1950), nicknamed "Pancho," is an American former open-wheel racing driver. Best known for his participation in Championship car racing, he won the pole position for the 1985 Indianapolis 500. Carter made 17 career starts at the Indianapolis 500, winning rookie of the year in 1974 and had a best finish of third in the 1982 race. He scored one victory in Indy car racing, at the 1981 Michigan 500.

== Racing career ==
=== Midget cars ===
Carter's national career began while racing in a midget car. He won the 1972 USAC midget car championship. He won the 1972 and 1975 Hut Hundred. He had 23 midget car feature wins by the time he left the series in 1978.

=== Sprint cars ===
Carter won the 1974 and 1976 national USAC sprint car championships. He was the first driver to win the two USAC championships – midgets and sprint cars. He has wins in three USAC divisions – midgets, sprints and Silver Crown (formerly known as dirt cars).

On May 30, 1977, Carter won two USAC Midget features, one USAC sprint feature and finished second in the second USAC sprint feature at Salem Speedway on a day the temperatures were near 100 degrees. This was one day after he finished fifteenth in the Indianapolis 500.

Carter ran well on dirt and pavement, but was exceptional on the paved high banks at Winchester and Salem, Indianapolis, and Dayton, Ohio. He won the Joe James/Pat O'Conner Memorial race at the half-mile at Salem, Indiana, on four consecutive occasions.

Carter was seriously injured during a testing crash at Phoenix International Speedway in November 1977. The injuries left him with a permanent disability in one of his legs that hampered his ability to perform well on road courses. He still ran very well on ovals. He made his return to racing at the end of March in 1978, winning a USAC Sprint race at the paved five-eighths mile Indianapolis Raceway Park on Saturday night and at the high-banked half-mile Winchester Speedway the next day – his first races back in the cockpit of a racecar.

Carter was inducted in the National Midget Auto Racing Hall of Fame in 1990, and the National Sprint Car Hall of Fame in 1991.

=== IndyCar ===
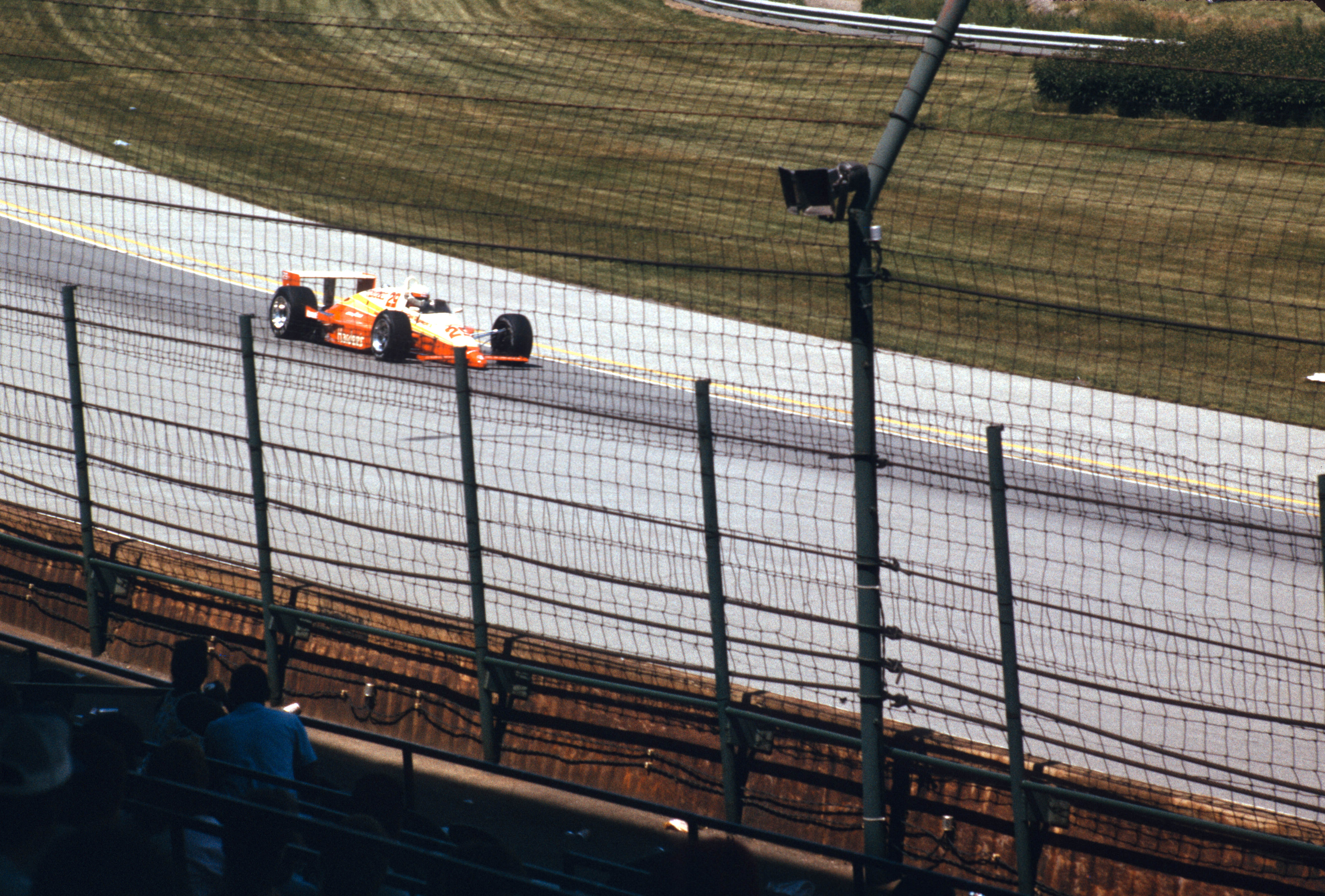
Carter qualifying for the 1987 Indianapolis 500

Carter drove his first Indianapolis 500 in 1974. He finished seventh, and was awarded the Rookie of the Year. In 1981 he finished third in the CART championship and captured his only Indy Car win at Michigan International Speedway. He finished third in the 1982 Indianapolis 500 behind the now-famous duel between Gordon Johncock and Rick Mears. In 1985, Carter drove the brand new Buick V6 engine to the pole position of the 1985 Indianapolis 500. He retired with mechanical problems after completing just six laps, becoming the first pole-sitter since Cliff Woodbury to finish dead-last. His last year as a full-time Indy Car driver was 1990 and his last appearance in an indy car was failing to qualify for the 1994 Indianapolis 500. In more recent years, Carter has served as a spotter for Sam Hornish Jr., Vítor Meira, Dillon Battistini, Dan Wheldon, Martin Plowman and Adrián Campos Jr. In 2019, he was the spotter for rookie Santino Ferrucci, who finished seventh, as the Rookie of the Year, at the Indianapolis 500. This was the same as Carter in his 500 debut.

=== NASCAR ===
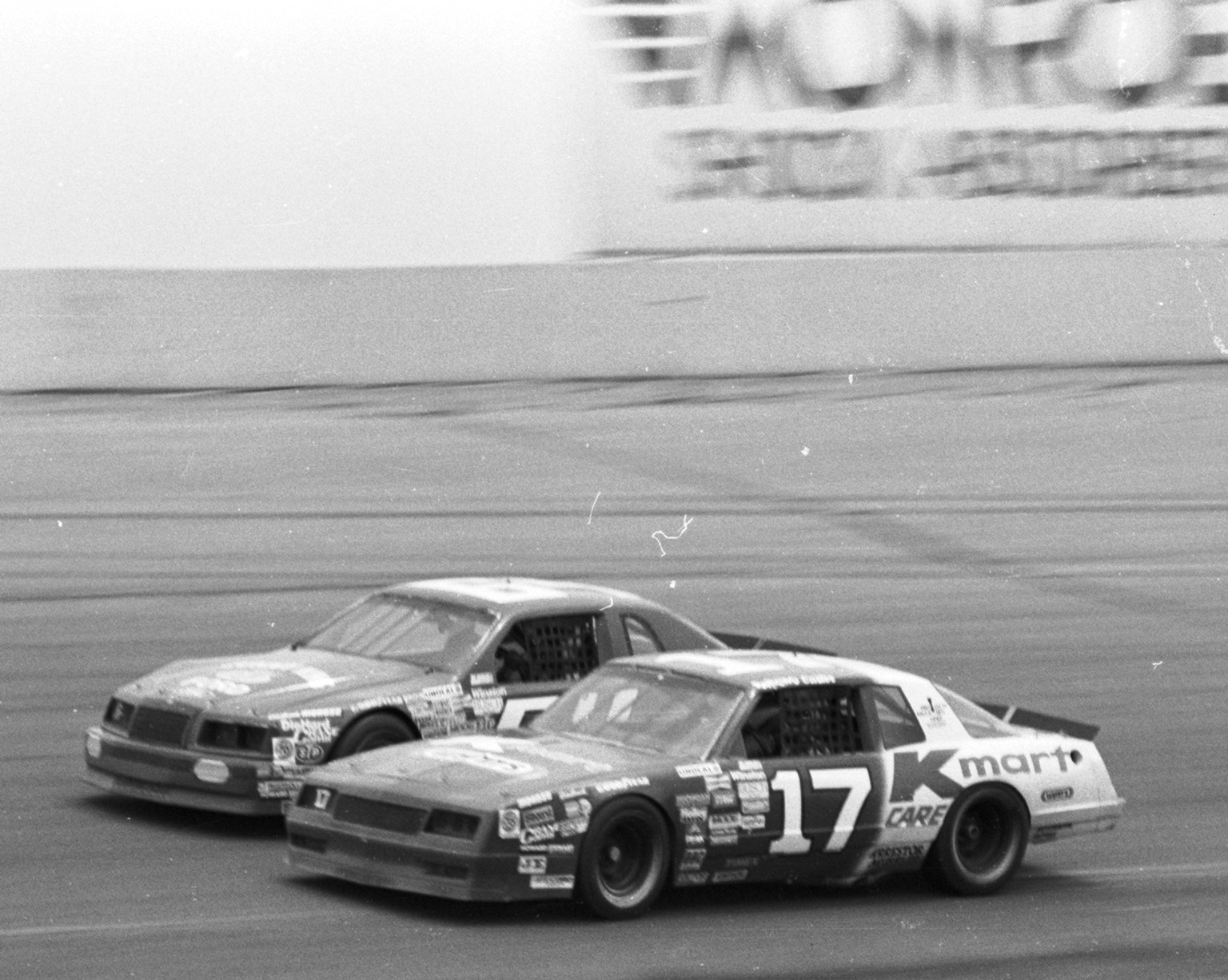
Carter passes Eddie Bierschwale at Pocono in 1986

From 1985 to 1995, Carter ran fourteen NASCAR Winston Cup Series races for multiple owners. His first start was at Darlington Raceway in 1985, which was the Southern 500. The race was best known for Bill Elliott locking up the Winston Million, Carter finished in 22nd. Carter began the 1986 season driving for Elmo Langley; at the 1986 Daytona 500, he and Kyle Petty were involved in a turn one accident, thus winding up in 34th place. After three races with Langley's team, he moved to driving for Roger Hamby, competing in six more races that year; he posted his best career NASCAR finish with Hamby, a seventeenth-place finish at the Michigan International Speedway. In 1990, he competed at Atlanta Motor Speedway, driving for Paul Romine; he drove for Donlavey Racing at Charlotte Motor Speedway in 1992, and his final two races in Winston Cup competition came for Triad Motorsports at Atlanta Motor Speedway in 1994, where he tied his career-best finish, and Pocono Raceway in 1995.

In 1995, Carter also raced two Craftsman Truck Series races, driving for Enerjetix Motorsports.

== Post-racing career ==
Carter has worked as a coach and spotter for IndyCar drivers including Sam Hornish Jr. and David Malukas.

== Personal life ==
Duane "Pancho" Carter Jr. is the son of Indy car racer Duane Carter Sr. He was born while his parents were on the way to a race at the Milwaukee Mile. His father's nickname was "Pappy". Pappy referred to his wife's pregnancy as "little paunch," so they nicknamed the child Pancho. Carter is the half-brother of Johnny Parsons. Their mother, Azra divorced Johnnie Parsons, and eventually remarried, to Duane Carter Sr.

Carter's full brother, Dana Carter, also raced in USAC midgets, sprints and Silver Crown. Dana qualified but was bumped at the 1979 Indianapolis 500. He returned in 1980, but suffered a crash in practice. After a sabbatical from racing, he was back behind the wheel in 1982. Dana died of a heart attack on May 6, 1983, the morning after finishing second in a USAC midget race at the Indianapolis Speedrome.

Carter is a graduate of California State University, Long Beach. He is married, to Carla; they have two children, Dane and Cole, who spot for Paul Miller Racing's IMSA entries as well as for Andretti Autosport's Indy car and rally cross entries.

== Motorsports career results ==
=== American open-wheel racing ===
(key) (Races in bold indicate pole position)

==== USAC Champ Car/Gold Crown Series ====
USAC Champ Car/Gold Crown results
Year	Team	1	2	3	4	5	6	7	8	9	10	11	12	13	14	15	16	17	18	Rank	Points
1974	Fletcher Racing	ONT	ONT	ONT	PHX	TRE	INDY; 7	MIL	POC; 15	MCH; 9	MIL; 12	MCH; 2	TRE; 9	TRE; 6	PHX; 9					12th	1040
1975	Fletcher Racing	ONT; 2	ONT	ONT; 19	PHX; 8	TRE	INDY; 4	MIL; 6	POC; 24	MCH; 4	MIL; 14	MCH; 8	TRE; DNS	PHX; 8						9th	1345
1976	All American Racers	PHX; 2	TRE; 7	INDY; 5	MIL; 18	POC; 14	MCH	TWS	TRE	MIL	ONT; 29	MCH; DNS	TWS; 10	PHX						12th	920
1977	All American Racers	ONT; 3	PHX; 20	TWS; 11	TRE; 9	INDY; 15	MIL; 5	POC; 20	MOS	MCH; 10	TWS; 3	MIL; 2	ONT; 14	MCH						8th	1420
1977	Alex Morales Motorsports														PHX; 3					8th	1420
1978	Fletcher Racing	PHX	ONT	TWS	TRE	INDY; 24	MOS; 15	MIL; 21	POC; 10	MCH; DNS	ATL; 11	TWS; 11	MIL	ONT; 2	MCH; 18	TRE; 7	SIL	BRH	PHX; 9	10th	1206
1979	Alex Morales Motorsports	ONT	TWS	INDY; 20	MIL	POC	TWS	MIL												NC	0
1980	Alex Morales Motorsports	ONT; 18	INDY; 6	MIL; 4	POC; 6	MOH; 7														5th	1078
1981-82	Alex Morales Motorsports	INDY; 28	POC	ILL	DUQ	ISF	INDY; 3													NC	0

==== PPG Indycar Series ====
CART IndyCar World Series results
Year	Team	1	2	3	4	5	6	7	8	9	10	11	12	13	14	15	16	17	Rank	Points	Ref
1979	Alex Morales Motorsports	PHX; 20	ATL; 9	ATL; 11	INDY; 20	TRE; 10	TRE; 8	MCH; 7	MCH; 14	WGL; 16	TRE; DNS	ONT; 28	MCH; 8	ATL; 13	PHX; 7				**13th**	**452**	
1980	Alex Morales Motorsports	ONT; 18	INDY; 6	MIL; 4	POC; 6	MOH; 7	MCH; 3	WGL; 7	MIL; 22	ONT; 7	MCH; 7	MEX; 22	PHX; 19						**5th**	**1855**	
1981	Alex Morales Motorsports	PHX; 7	MIL; 20	ATL; 5	ATL; 5	MCH; 1	RIV; 10	MIL; 10	MCH; 18	WGL; 15	MEX; 6	PHX; 5							**3rd**	**166**	
1982	Alex Morales Motorsports	PHX; 6	ATL; 10	MIL; 13	CLE; 19	MCH; 18	MIL; 6	POC; 28	RIV; 19	ROA; 11	MCH; 12	PHX; 11							**17th**	**47**	
1983	Alex Morales Motorsports	ATL; 16	INDY; 7	MIL; 14	CLE; 8	MCH; 6	ROA; 7	POC; 6	RIV; 7	MOH; 10	MCH; 15	CPL; 6	LAG; 25	PHX; 10					**10th**	**53**	
1984	Galles Racing	LBH	PHX	INDY; 19	MIL	POR	MEA	CLE	MCH; 6	ROA	POC; 7	MOH	SAN	MCH	PHX; 7	LAG	CPL; 11		**21st**	**22**	
1985	Galles Racing	LBH; 13	**INDY**; 33	MIL; 5	POR; 13	MEA	CLE; 16	MCH; 16	ROA	POC; 12	MOH	SAN; 2	MCH; 10	LAG	PHX; 7	MIA			**18th**	**33**	
1986	Galles Racing	PHX	LBH	INDY; 16	MIL	POR	MEA	CLE	TOR	MCH; 3	POC; 3	MOH	SAN; 15	MCH	ROA	LAG	PHX	MIA	**19th**	**28**	
1987	Machinists Union Racing	LBH	PHX	INDY; 27	MIL	POR	MEA	CLE	TOR	MCH; 20	POC; 6	ROA; 14	MOH; 14	NAZ; 17	LAG; 12	MIA; 14			**25th**	**9**	
1988	Machinists Union Racing	PHX	LBH	INDY; DNQ	MIL	POR	CLE	TOR	MEA	MCH	POC	MOH	ROA	NAZ	LAG	MIA			NC	-	
1989	Leader Card Racing	PHX; 7	LBH; 17	INDY; 22	MIL; 9	DET; 10	POR; 9	CLE; 14	MEA; 13	TOR; 27	MCH; 26	POC; 12	MOH; 28	ROA; 19	NAZ; 18	LAG; 24			**13th**	**18**	
1990	Leader Card Racing	PHX; 8	LBH	INDY; 29	MIL; 15	DET; 9	POR; 15	CLE; 14	MEA; 18	TOR; 18	MCH; 18	DEN	VAN	MOH	ROA	NAZ	LAG		**20th**	**9**	
1991	Arciero Racing	SRF	LBH	PHX	INDY; 21	MIL; 14	DET	POR	CLE	MEA	TOR								**26th**	**3**	
1991	Leader Card Racing											MCH; 10	DEN	VAN	MOH	ROA	NAZ	LAG	**26th**	**3**	
1992	Hemelgarn Racing	SRF	PHX	LBH	INDY; DNQ	DET	POR	MIL											**31st**	**2**	
1992	Gilmore Racing								NHA; 11	TOR	MCH; 17	CLE	ROA	VAN	MOH	NAZ	LAG		**31st**	**2**	
1994	McCormack Motorsports	SRF	PHX	LBH	INDY; DNQ	MIL	DET	POR	CLE	TOR	MCH	MOH	NHA	VAN	ROA	NAZ	LAG		NC	-	

==== Indianapolis 500 ====
Year	Chassis	Engine	Start	Finish
1974	Eagle	Offy	21st	7th
1975	Eagle	Offy	18th	4th
1976	Eagle	Offy	6th	5th
1977	Eagle	Offy	8th	15th
1978	Lightning	Cosworth	21st	24th
1979	Lightning	Cosworth	17th	20th
1980	Penske	Cosworth	8th	6th
1981	Penske	Cosworth	10th	28th
1982	March	Cosworth	10th	3rd
1983	March	Cosworth	14th	7th
1984	March	Cosworth	21st	19th
1985	March	Buick	**1st**	33rd
1986	Lola	Cosworth	14th	16th
1987	March	Cosworth	29th	27th
1988	March	Buick	Qualifying Crash	
1989	Lola	Cosworth	32nd	22nd
1990	Lola	Cosworth	22nd	29th
1991	Lola	Buick	32nd	21st
1992	Lola	Buick	Failed to Qualify	
1994	Lola	Chevrolet	Failed to Qualify	

=== NASCAR ===
(key) (Bold – Pole position awarded by qualifying time. Italics – Pole position earned by points standings or practice time. * – Most laps led.)

==== Winston Cup Series ====
NASCAR Winston Cup Series results
Year	Team	No.	Make	1	2	3	4	5	6	7	8	9	10	11	12	13	14	15	16	17	18	19	20	21	22	23	24	25	26	27	28	29	30	31	NWCC	Pts	Ref
1985	Ellington Racing	1	Chevy	DAY	RCH	CAR	ATL	BRI	DAR	NWS	MAR	TAL	DOV	CLT	RSD	POC	MCH	DAY	POC	TAL	MCH	BRI	DAR; 22	RCH	DOV	MAR	NWS	CLT	CAR	ATL	RSD				88th	97	
1986	Langley Racing	64	Ford	DAY; 34	RCH	CAR; 23	ATL; 38	BRI	DAR	NWS	MAR																								38th	706	
1986	Hamby Racing	17	Chevy									TAL; 18	DOV	CLT	RSD	POC; 28	MCH; 17	DAY; 28	POC	TAL; 40	GLN; 31	MCH	BRI	DAR	RCH	DOV	MAR	NWS	CLT	CAR	ATL	RSD			38th	706	
1990	Romine Racing	29	Ford	DAY	RCH	CAR	ATL	DAR	BRI	NWS	MAR	TAL	CLT	DOV	SON	POC	MCH	DAY	POC	TAL	GLN	MCH	BRI	DAR	RCH	DOV	MAR	NWS	CLT	CAR	PHO	ATL; 32			90th	67	
1992	Donlavey Racing	90	Ford	DAY	CAR	RCH	ATL	DAR	BRI	NWS	MAR	TAL	CLT	DOV	SON	POC	MCH	DAY	POC	TAL	GLN	MCH	BRI	DAR	RCH	DOV	MAR	NWS	CLT; 32	CAR	PHO	ATL			82nd	67	
1994	Triad Motorsports	78	Ford	DAY	CAR	RCH	ATL	DAR	BRI	NWS	MAR	TAL	SON	CLT	DOV	POC	MCH	DAY	NHA	POC	TAL	IND	GLN	MCH	BRI	DAR	RCH	DOV	MAR	NWS	CLT; DNQ	CAR	PHO	ATL; 17	60th	112	
1995	Triad Motorsports	78	Ford	DAY	CAR	RCH	ATL; DNQ	DAR	BRI	NWS	MAR	TAL	SON	CLT	DOV	POC; 35	MCH	DAY	NHA	POC	TAL														63rd	58	
1995	Cave Motorsports	78	Ford																			IND; DNQ	GLN	MCH	BRI	DAR	RCH	DOV	MAR	NWS	CLT	CAR	PHO	ATL	63rd	58	

===== Daytona 500 =====
Year	Team	Manufacturer	Start	Finish
1986	Langley Racing	Ford	28	34

==== SuperTruck Series ====
NASCAR SuperTruck Series results
Year	Team	No.	Make	1	2	3	4	5	6	7	8	9	10	11	12	13	14	15	16	17	18	19	20	NSTSC	Pts	Ref
1995	Enerjetix Motorsports	99	Chevy	PHO	TUS	SGS; DNQ	MMR; 28	POR; 16	EVG	I70	LVL	BRI	MLW	CNS	HPT	IRP	FLM	RCH	MAR	NWS	SON	MMR	PHO	49th	349	

Sporting positions
Preceded by Graham McRae	Indianapolis 500; Rookie of the Year; 1974	Succeeded by Bill Puterbaugh
