= Larry Dickson =

American racing driver (born 1938)

- Dickson at the 1968 Indianapolis 500
- Born: Larry G. Dickson; September 8, 1938 (age 88) Warren, Ohio, U.S.

Champ Car career
- 108 races run over 18 years
- Years active: 1965–1973, 1975–1983
- Best finish: 4th – 1979
- First race: 1965 Golden State 100 (Sacramento)
- Last race: 1983 Ted Horn 100 (DuQuoin)
Wins	Podiums	Poles
0	6	2

Larry Dickson (born September 8, 1938 in Warren, Ohio) is a former auto racing driver in the USAC and CART Championship Car series. He competed during the 1965–1973 and 1975–1983 seasons, with 108 combined career starts, including eight in the Indianapolis 500. He failed to qualify for the race on five other occasions. He had 43 top-ten finishes, with a best of second at Springfield in 1968. He also participated in a non-championship race at Fuji Speedway in 1966.

Dickson was a three-time USAC Sprint Car Series Champion in 1968, 1970 and 1975. He won 43 USAC Sprint car races and was the all-time leader in the division until Tom Bigelow broke his record. Between 1968 and 1971, Dickson and Gary Bettenhausen raced each other in what was billed as "The Larry and Gary Show" or "Thunder (Bettenhausen) and Lightning (Dickson)", exchanging the USAC Sprint Car title between them during those years.

Dickson also ventured to NASCAR to drive Richie Giachetti's Ford Torino in the 1972 Daytona 500, running in the top-ten before the engine expired. He finished his racing career in a USAC Silver Crown car owned by his brother, Tommy, and Max Brittain.

Dickson is now semi-retired, living in Indianapolis and tending to his real estate investments.

== Awards ==
- In 1990, Dickson was inducted into the National Sprint Car Hall of Fame as part of its inaugural class.

=== Indy 500 results ===
Year	Chassis	Engine	Start	Finish
1966	Lola	Ford	32nd	32nd
1967	Lotus	Ford	21st	15th
1968	Brawner	Ford	33rd	28th
1969	Vollstedt	Ford	31st	9th
1970	Gerhardt	Offy	Failed to Qualify	
1971	King	Offy	26th	28th
1972	King	Offy	Failed to Qualify	
1973	King	Offy	Failed to Qualify	
1976	Eagle	Offy	Failed to Qualify	
1977	McLaren	Offy	Practice Crash	
1978	Penske	Cosworth	9th	22nd
1979	Penske	Cosworth	24th	24th
1981	Penske	Cosworth	19th	18th

USAC Sprint Cars = Three-time National Champion1968, 1970 and 1975. USAC records, National Speed Sport News and other national racing press. uNITWS RACING CLUB - National Champion and Rookie of the Year 1964 Winner of the US Open supermodified race at Williams Grove, PA 1964
