= 1978 Indianapolis 500 =

American motor race

62nd Indianapolis 500
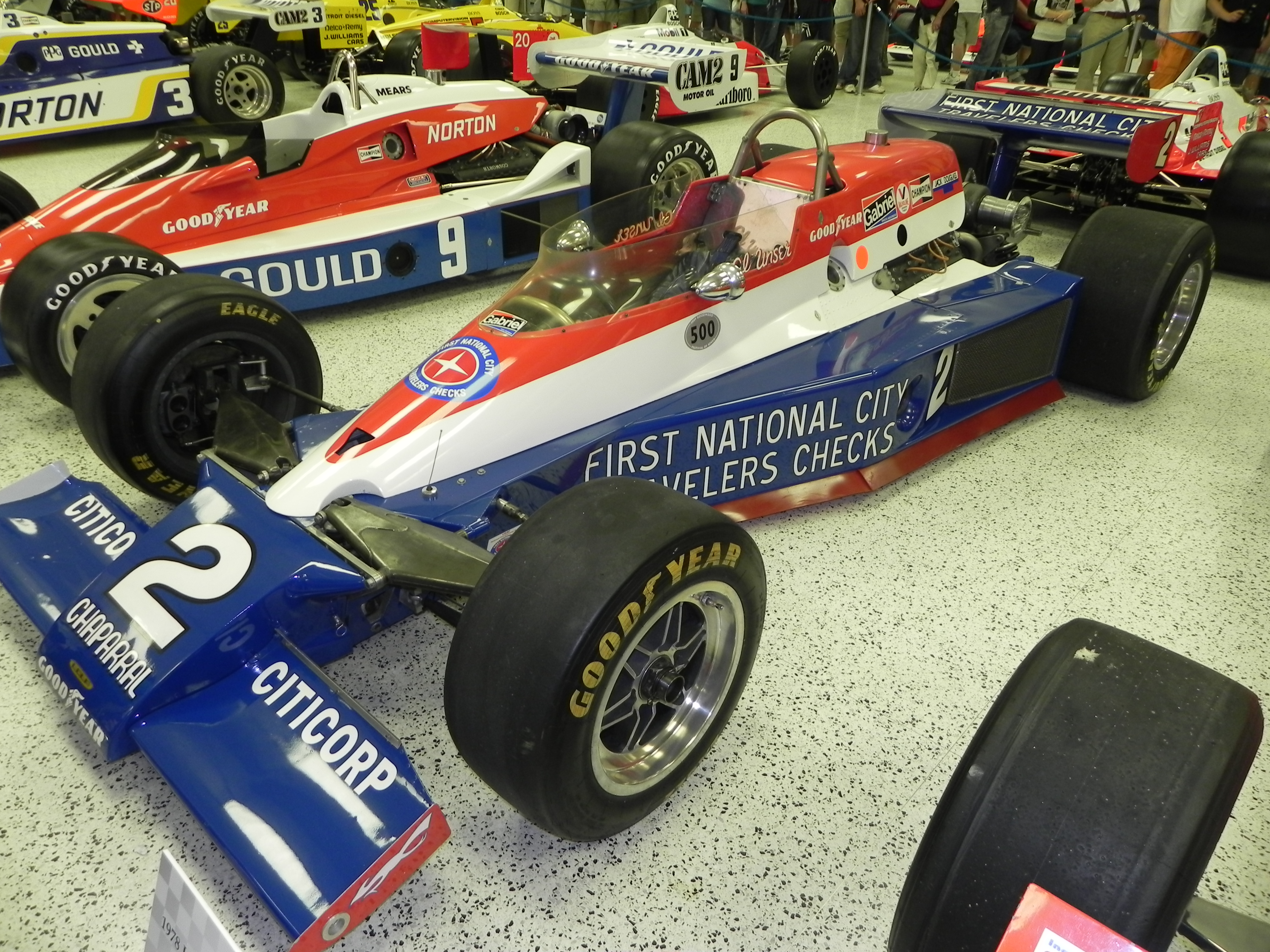

Indianapolis Motor Speedway

Indianapolis 500
- Sanctioning body: USAC
- Season: 1978 USAC Trail
- Date: May 28, 1978
- Winner: Al Unser Sr.
- Winning team: Jim Hall/Chaparral
- Winning Chief Mechanic: Hywel Absalom
- Time of race: 3:05:54.99
- Average speed: 161.363 mph (259.689 km/h)
- Pole position: Tom Sneva
- Pole speed: 202.156 mph (325.339 km/h)
- Fastest qualifier: Tom Sneva
- Rookie of the Year: Rick Mears & Larry Rice
- Most laps led: Al Unser, Sr. (121)

Pre-race ceremonies
- National anthem: Purdue band
- "Back Home Again in Indiana": Jim Nabors
- Starting command: Mary F. Hulman
- Pace car: Chevrolet Corvette C3
- Pace car driver: Jim Rathmann
- Starter: Pat Vidan
- Estimated attendance: 325,000

Television in the United States
- Network: ABC
- Announcers: Jim McKay and Jackie Stewart
- Nielsen ratings: 13.4 / 26

Chronology
Previous	Next
1977	1979

The 62nd 500 Mile International Sweepstakes was held at the Indianapolis Motor Speedway in Speedway, Indiana on Sunday, May 28, 1978. Danny Ongais dominated the early stages of the race but eventually dropped out with a blown engine. Al Unser Sr. dominated the second half, and held a large lead late in the race. However, Unser bent the front wing of his Lola during a pit stop on lap 180, causing his handling to go away over the final twenty laps. Second place Tom Sneva charged to catch Unser's crippled Lola but came up 8 seconds short at the finish line – the second-closest finish in Indy history to that point. Unser held off the challenge, and became a three-time winner of the 500. It was Al Unser's third Indy victory in the decade of the 1970s, and the fifth of nine overall victories by the Unser family.

Al Unser Sr. entered the month having won the 1977 California 500 at Ontario the previous September. Later in the 1978 season, Unser would go on to win the Pocono 500 and the California 500 again, sweeping the "triple crown" of Indy car racing for 1978. As of 2015 (the last year there was a "Triple Crown") Unser is the only driver in history to win all three 500-mile "triple crown" races in the same season, and coupled with the win at Ontario in 1977, set a record by winning four straight 500-mile Indy car races.

Second year driver Janet Guthrie finished ninth, and it was later revealed she drove with a fractured wrist. It was the highest finish for a female driver in Indy history until Danica Patrick finished in fourth place in 2005. During time trials, Tom Sneva, who had broken the 200 mph (320 km/h) barrier a year earlier, bettered his own record. This time he managed to complete all four qualifying laps over 200 mph (320 km/h), setting once again new one-lap and four-lap track records.

Tony Hulman, the popular owner and president of the track since 1945, died the previous October. His widow Mary F. Hulman was named the chairperson of the board of the Speedway, and for the first time she delivered the famous starting command. Along with the death of Tony Hulman, the race was held just five weeks after eight USAC officials were killed in a plane crash. With dissent increasing among the participants about organizational issues and poor revenue, the 1978 race would be the final Indy 500 contested prior to the formation of CART and prior to the first open wheel "split."

Al Unser's victory was the first Indy triumph for the Cosworth DFX V8 engine. The British-based engine building company would go on to win the Indianapolis 500 for ten consecutive years.

== Race schedule ==
Race schedule – May, 1978
Sun	Mon	Tue	Wed	Thu	Fri	Sat
	1	2	3	4	5	6 Practice
7 Practice	8 Practice	9 Practice	10; Practice	11; Practice	12; Practice	13; Time Trials
14; Time Trials	15; Practice	16; Practice	17; Practice	18; Practice	19; Practice	20; Time Trials
21; Time Trials	22	23	24	25; Carb Day	26; Mini-Marathon	27; Parade
28; Indy 500	29; Memorial Day	30	31			

Color	Notes
Green	Practice
Dark Blue	Time trials
Silver	Race day
Red	Rained out*
Blank	No track activity

* Includes days where track
activity was significantly
limited due to rain

== Practice and time trials ==
For 1978, the turbocharger "boost" settings were set at 80 inHg, the same regulations used in 1974–1975 and 1977. The first weekend of time trials was scheduled for May 13–14. Rain, however, washed out the entire first weekend. Pole qualifying was moved to Saturday May 20.

=== Practice ===
On Wednesday May 10, Mario Andretti turned a practice lap of 201.838 mph (324.827 km/h), faster than the track record. Minutes later, Danny Ongais upped the best speed to 201.974 mph (325.046 km/h). On Thursday May 11, rookie Rick Mears also joined the coveted "200 mph club" in practice. Johnny Rutherford (199.2 mph (320.6 km/h)) and A. J. Foyt (199.158 mph (320.514 km/h)) were also within striking distance.

On Friday May 12, the final day of practice before pole qualifying was scheduled to be held, Mario Andretti shattered the unofficial track record, turning a lap of 203.482 mph (327.473 km/h). Also over 200 mph (320 km/h) were Mears, Rutherford, and Foyt. Tom Sneva, the driver who broke the 200 mph barrier a year earlier, was the slowest of the three Penske cars, managing only a 196.3 mph (315.9 km/h) lap during practice.

The rainout of time trials complicated the schedule for Mario Andretti. He was forced to leave the track and fly to Zolder for the Belgian Grand Prix which he won driving the Lotus 79 for the first time. Arrangements were being made for another driver to qualify the car for him, and he would return to the cockpit for race day. With no track activity possible at Indy for Sunday, A. J. Foyt flew to Talladega and finished third in the NASCAR Winston 500.

During the second week of practice, Pancho Carter and Tom Sneva joined the "200 mph club." Sneva had a hand-timed lap of about 203.1 mph (326.9 km/h), inching closer to Andretti's mark from the previous week. Danny Ongais destroyed his primary car in a crash in turn four on Tuesday May 16. He was not seriously injured, but would have to qualify with his back-up car.

=== Pole Day – Saturday May 20 ===
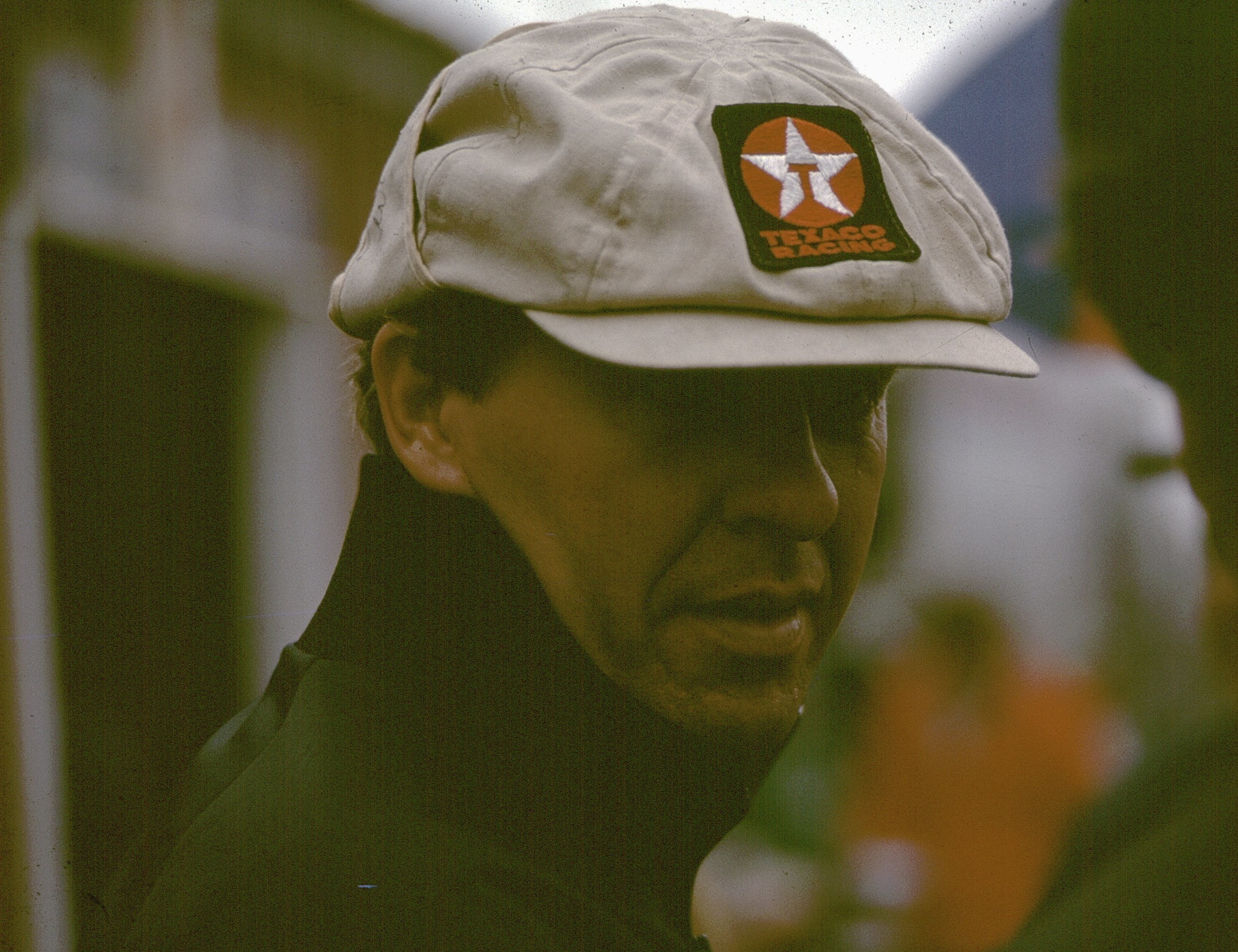
Tom Sneva won his second-consecutive pole position.

Since the first two days of time trials were rained out, pole qualifying was moved to the third day (May 20). The field was allowed one trip through the original qualifying draw order. Each car would be guaranteed an opportunity for one attempt during pole round. As soon as they reached the end of the qualifying draw, the pole position round would be concluded, and the "Third Day" of qualifying would commence.

Pole day dawned with temperatures in the high 70s and low 80s. Qualifying started promptly at 11:00 a.m., with Johnny Rutherford first out on the track. He fell short of the 200 mph barrier on all four laps, and settled for an average of 197.098 mph (317.198 km/h).

At 12:03 p.m., Tom Sneva took to the track. Following in his own footsteps from the previous year, he set new all-time one-lap and four-lap track records, becoming the first driver in Indy history to complete all four qualifying laps over 200 mph.

- Lap 1 – 44.20 seconds, 203.620 mph (327.695 km/h) (new 1-lap track record)
- Lap 2 – 44.43 seconds, 202.566 mph (325.998 km/h)
- Lap 3 – 44.60 seconds, 201.794 mph (324.756 km/h)
- Lap 4 – 44.85 seconds, 200.669 mph (322.945 km/h)
- Total – 2:58.08, 202.156 mph (325.339 km/h) (new 4-lap track record)

Due to changes in the rules in subsequent years, Sneva's one-lap and four-lap track records would stand until 1982. Sneva's four-lap average secured the pole position, his second pole in a row.

Sneva's Penske teammate, rookie Rick Mears, was the next car out. Mears completed three laps over 200 mph, and his four-lap average of 200.078 mph (321.994 km/h) was a rookie speed record, and would be good enough for the front row.

Janet Guthrie returned for her second start, and qualified strongly at 190.325 mph (306.298 km/h). At 12:39 p.m., Danny Ongais made it an "all 200 mph" front row, securing second starting position at 200.122 mph (322.065 km/h).

After practicing over 200 mph, A. J. Foyt was forced to wave off his run, and missed his chance at qualifying during the pole round. Mike Hiss was hired by Penske to drive substitute for Mario Andretti during time trials. Hiss qualified the car with a respectable speed of 194.647 mph (313.254 km/h) to rank 8th. However, on race day, Andretti would get back in the car, and he would be forced to line up in the 33rd starting position due to the driver switch.

Rain late in the day hampered the qualifying attempts. The trip through the original qualifying line exhausted at 5 p.m., and Tom Sneva officially secured the pole position. Several drivers including Bobby Unser, A. J. Foyt, and Pancho Carter, were unable to qualify during the pole round. At 5 p.m., the "third day" of time trials officially commenced, and those drivers would line up behind the cars from the pole round.

The day ended with the field filled to twenty cars. Bobby Unser finished his run in the rain as the lone "third day" qualifier. The track was closed for the day as soon as Unser returned to the pits at 5:11 p.m.

=== Bump Day – Sunday May 21 ===
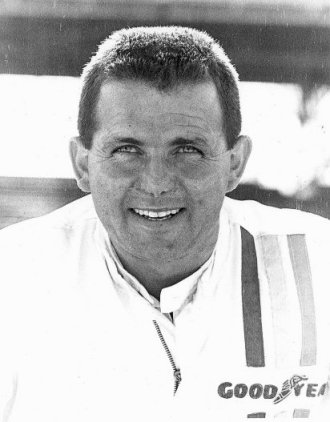
Jim Hurtubise drew controversy on Bump Day.

The final day of time trials opened with 13 spots unfilled. A. J. Foyt at 200.120 mph (322.062 km/h) was the fastest driver of the day. His speed was tied for second-fastest, but as a final day qualifier, he would line up 20th.

Roger Rager was the only major on-track incident of the day. At 3:53 p.m., on his second warm-up lap, he hit the outside wall in turn four, suffering an injured hand. Rager would miss the race. After a wave off on Saturday, Larry "Boom Boom" Cannon went out for his second attempt. He spun and brushed the wall on his second qualifying lap, and had to abort the run. Later on his third and final attempt, he was too slow to bump his way into the field. Dick Simon brushed the wall on the main stretch shaking down a car for Bill Puterbaugh. The car lost two wheels and it was too late in the day for the car to be repaired.

In the final hour, there was one spot left in the field when Bob Harkey was preparing to make his attempt. Jim Hurtubise, who had once again entered his now-infamous Mallard/Offy front-engined car, had been denied the permission to qualify, due to lack of speed. USAC had decided to set a 180 mph (290 km/h) minimum speed in order to pass "final" inspection, receive the appropriate sticker, and be allowed to make a qualifying attempt. They deemed Hurtubise ineligible, claiming he had not broken 175 mph (282 km/h), despite some claiming he had lapped over 184 mph (296 km/h). Hurtubise considered the ruling a personal harassment, lies, and an effort by USAC, Goodyear, and the Speedway to single him out and keep him from qualifying. After being a popular fixture amongst the fans for many years, several episodes of antics had caused some to begin to view Hurtubise unfavorably. Hurtubise got into a heated exchange with chief steward Tom Binford, then proceeded to climb into Harkey's car, shouting "If I can't qualify, no one can!" After a few minutes, Hurtubise was coaxed out of the car, and Harkey climbed in to crank it up. With some encouragement from the crowd, Hurtubise then jumped in front of Harkey, preventing him from pulling out of the pits. He had to be restrained by safety patrol members, and Harkey managed to pull away. While Harkey was on the backstretch of his warm-up lap, Hurtubise jumped over the pit wall and ran out on the race track in order to disrupt and halt the qualifying attempt. Running down the main stretch, several guards chased after him. Hurtubise was tackled by John Martin and was then detained by police. By this time, the crowd's opinion had changed, and they began booing and jeering Hurtubise for going too far by disrupting qualifying. Hurtubise was banned from the track for the remainder of the month.

Harkey managed to finish his qualifying attempt without incident, but his speed was not fast enough to stand. Within twenty minutes, Harkey was bumped by Joe Saldana. The day closed with Cliff Hucul bumping Graham McRae with two minutes left in the day.

After missing time trials, Mario Andretti won the Grand Prix of Belgium. He traveled back to Indianapolis during the week, and would be back in time for Carburetion Day "tests."

== Carburetion Day ==
The final practice was held on Thursday May 25. A. J. Foyt turned a fast lap of 199.468 mph, but then shut the engine off due to an oil line problem. He coasted to stop and required a tow-in. Gary Bettenhausen skipped the session as the crew was installing a new engine. Joe Saldana also failed to turn any laps as his crew was putting the finishing touches on a new engine install. Mario Andretti returned from Belgium and turned a lap of 192.719 mph, the third-fastest of the day. No incidents were reported.

=== Pit Stop Contest ===
The elimination rounds for the 2nd annual Miller Pit Stop Contest were held Thursday May 25. Eight teams qualified for the contest during preliminary trials on May 17–18. Johnny Rutherford (12.89 seconds) was the fastest qualifier, with Wally Dallenbach (19.86 seconds) ranking second, and Al Loquasto (20.53 second) third. The other qualifiers included Larry Dickson (20.85 seconds), Johnny Parsons (20.89), Roger McCluskey, Pancho Carter, and Bobby Olivero. However, Olivero was later replaced by Mike Mosley. Loquasto was bumped from the race starting lineup, but stayed to compete in the pit stop contest.

The finals pitted Team McLaren (Johnny Rutherford) versus the Russ Polak/Dickson-Looper team (Larry Dickson). Rutherford's crew was victorious, the first of back-to-back wins in the event for Team McLaren.

Quarterfinals
Johnny Rutherford (Team McLaren)
Johnny Parsons (Lindsey Hopkins)
Pancho Carter (Fletcher Racing)
Al Loquasto (Loquasto)
Roger McCluskey (Warner Hodgdon)
Wally Dallenbach (O'Connell Racing)
Larry Dickson (Dickson-Looper)
Mike Mosley (Morales Motorsports)

Semifinals
Johnny Rutherford (Team McLaren)
Pancho Carter (Fletcher Racing)
Larry Dickson (Dickson-Looper)
Roger McCluskey (Warner Hodgdon)

Finals
Johnny Rutherford (Team McLaren)	13.80
Larry Dickson (Dickson-Looper)	17.27

== Starting lineup ==
Row	Inside		Middle		Outside	
1	1	(United States) Tom Sneva; Norton Spirit; Team Penske; Penske PC-6, Cosworth DFX; 202.156 mph (325.339 km/h)	25	(United States) Danny Ongais; Interscope Racing; Ted Field; Parnelli, Cosworth DFX; 200.122 mph (322.065 km/h)	71	(United States) Rick Mears R CAM2 Motor Oil; Team Penske; Penske PC-6, Cosworth DFX; 200.078 mph (321.994 km/h)
2	4	(United States) Johnny Rutherford W 1st National City Travelers Checks; Team McLaren; McLaren 77, Cosworth DFX; 197.098 mph (317.198 km/h)	2	(United States) Al Unser W 1st National City Travelers Checks; Chaparral Racing; Lola 78, Cosworth DFX; 196.474 mph (316.194 km/h)	20	(United States) Gordon Johncock W North American Van Lines; Patrick Racing; Wildcat 78, DGS; 195.833 mph (315.163 km/h)
3	6	(United States) Wally Dallenbach Sr. Sugaripe Prune; Jerry O'Connell; McLaren 77, Cosworth DFX; 195.228 mph (314.189 km/h)	16	(United States) Johnny Parsons; 1st National City Travelers Checks; Lindsey Hopkins; Lightning, Offenhauser; 194.280 mph (312.663 km/h)	80	(United States) Larry Dickson; Polak Construction/Sta-On Car Glaze; Russ Polak; Penske PC-5, Cosworth DFX; 193.434 mph (311.302 km/h)
4	17	(United States) Dick Simon; La Machine; Rolla Vollstedt; Vollstedt, Offenhauser; 192.967 mph (310.550 km/h)	11	(United States) Roger McCluskey; National Auto Engineering; Warner Hodgdon; Eagle 76, AMC; 192.256 mph (309.406 km/h)	24	(United States) Sheldon Kinser; Thermo King; Ralph Wilke; Watson, Offenhauser; 192.051 mph (309.076 km/h)
5	40	(United States) Steve Krisiloff; Foreman Industries; Patrick Racing; Wildcat, DGS; 191.255 mph (307.795 km/h)	22	(United States) Tom Bagley R Kent Oil; Ralph Wilke; Watson 77, Offenhauser; 190.941 mph (307.290 km/h)	51	(United States) Janet Guthrie; Texaco Star; Janet Guthrie; Wildcat, DGS; 190.325 mph (306.298 km/h)
6	19	(United States) Spike Gehlhausen; Hubler Chevrolet/WIRE; Carl Gehlhausen; Eagle 74, Offenhauser; 190.325 mph (306.298 km/h)	39	(United States) John Mahler; Tibon; Carl Gehlhausen; Eagle, Offenhauser; 189.723 mph (305.330 km/h)	43	(United States) Tom Bigelow; Armstrong Moulding; Sherman Armstrong; Wildcat 76, DGS; 189.115 mph (304.351 km/h)
7	48	(United States) Bobby Unser W ARCO Graphite; All American Racers; Eagle 78, Cosworth DFX; 194.658 mph (313.272 km/h)	14	(United States) A. J. Foyt W Gilmore/Citicorp; A. J. Foyt Enterprises; Coyote, Foyt V-8; 200.122 mph (322.065 km/h)	8	(United States) Pancho Carter; Budweiser; Arizona Mechanics; Lightning, Offenhauser; 196.829 mph (316.766 km/h)
8	77	(United States) Salt Walther; Dayton-Walther; George Walther; McLaren, Cosworth DFX; 193.226 mph (310.967 km/h)	84	(United States) George Snider; Gilmore/Citicorp; A. J. Foyt Enterprises; Coyote, Foyt V-8; 192.627 mph (310.003 km/h)	69	(United States) Joe Saldana R Mr. Wize-Buys Carpet; Dynamics Inc. Eagle 73, Offenhauser; 190.809 mph (307.077 km/h)
9	78	(United States) Mike Mosley; Alex XLNT Foods; Alex Morales; Lightning, Offenhauser; 188.719 mph (303.714 km/h)	26	(United States) Jim McElreath; Circle City Coal; Jim McElreath; Eagle 74, Offenhauser; 188.058 mph (302.650 km/h)	29	(Canada) Cliff Hucul; Wendy's Hamburgers; Hucul-Hunter-Arndt; McLaren, Offenhauser; 187.803 mph (302.240 km/h)
10	88	(United States) Jerry Karl; Machinists Union; Frank Fiore; McLaren, Cosworth DFX; 187.549 mph (301.831 km/h)	47	(United States) Phil Threshie R Circle Chevy/Tutwiler; Phil Threshie; Lightning, Offenhauser; 187.520 mph (301.784 km/h)	35	(United States) Larry Rice R Bryant Heating/WIBC; Patrick Santello; Lightning, Offenhauser; 187.393 mph (301.580 km/h)
11	98	(United States) Gary Bettenhausen; Oberdorfer; Grant King; King 76, Offenhauser; 187.324 mph (301.469 km/h)	30	(United States) Jerry Sneva; Smock Materials; Marv Schmidt; McLaren, Offenhauser; 187.266 mph (301.375 km/h)	7	(United States) Mario Andretti W Gould Charge; Team Penske; Penske PC-6, Cosworth DFX; 194.329 mph (312.742 km/h)†

Mike Hiss qualified Mario Andretti's car while Andretti was in Belgium to compete in the Belgian Grand Prix, a race Andretti would win. Andretti took over the car for race day. Due to the driver change, USAC rules stated the entry must start at the rear of the field (33rd).

=== Alternates ===
- First alternate: Graham McRae (#33, #34) – Bumped
- Second alternate: Bob Harkey (#42) – Bumped

=== Failed to qualify ===
- Al Loquasto (#86) – Bumped
- Larry "Boom Boom" Cannon (#85) – Too slow
- Bill Vukovich Jr. (#18, #93) – Incomplete qualifying run
- John Martin (#28) – Incomplete qualifying runs
- Bubby Jones (#18) – Incomplete qualifying runs
- Gary Irvin R (#9) – Incomplete qualifying run
- Roger Rager R (#9, #97) – Wrecked during qualifying attempt
- Mike Hiss (#7, #66) – qualified 8th, but turned the car over to Mario Andretti
- Lee Kunzman (#90)
- Bobby Olivero (#78)
- Eldon Rasmussen (#58)
- Jim Hurtubise – Barred from making a qualifying attempt due to lack of speed; detained by police after running out onto the track to disrupt time trials.

R = Indianapolis 500 rookie
W = Former Indianapolis 500 winner

== Race summary ==
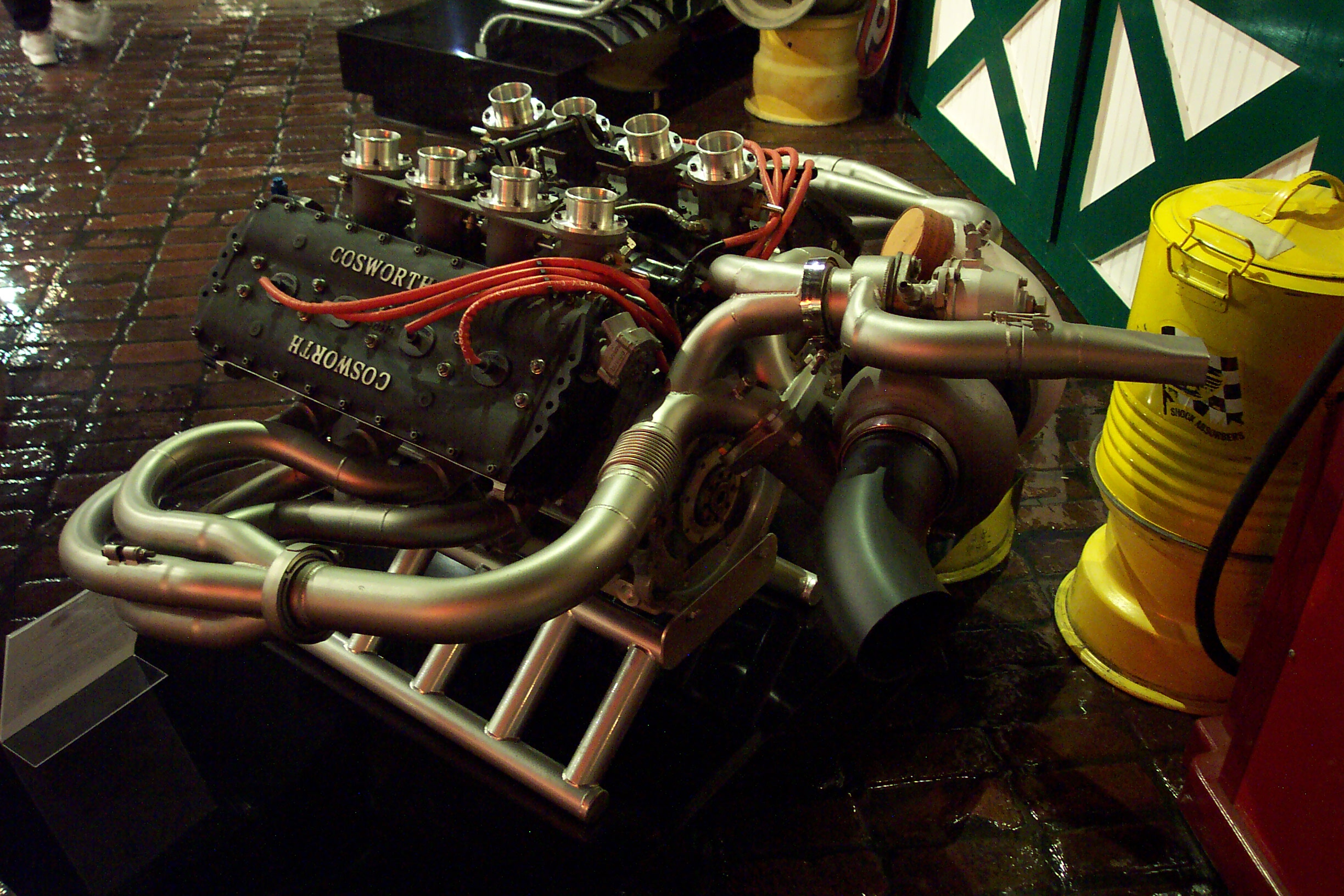
1978 was the first of ten consecutive Indy victories for the Cosworth DFX engine.

=== Start ===
Race day dawned hot and humid, with temperatures in the high 80s (°F). After the death of Tony Hulman, the starting command was recited by his widow Mary F. Hulman. With Janet Guthrie in the field once again, the traditional command was again tweaked. This time command was worded "Lady and Gentlemen, start your engines!"

During the pace laps, Gary Bettenhausen pulled into the pits with mechanical trouble, and missed the start. At the green flag, Danny Ongais darted into the lead, with Tom Sneva falling in line behind him in second. Rick Mears suddenly faded and pulled to the outside, and was passed by several cars. Ongais completed the first lap at a record speed of 185.185 mph (298.026 km/h).

Sheldon Kinser stalled on the backstretch, and brought out the yellow light for three laps. Rick Mears ducked into the pits for an unscheduled stop. He had neglected to fasten his helmet strap properly, and nearly lost his helmet at the start of the race. He was able to properly fasten his helmet, and returned to the race.

The green came back out on lap 5, with Ongais pulling out to a comfortable lead. Cliff Hucul went to pits, and was out of the race with a broken oil line.

=== First half ===
Mario Andretti quickly charged from last starting position to run as high as 13th in the early going. However, he was forced to pit to change a bad spark plug wire. He lost 8 laps, and was effectively out of contention for the rest of the day.

On lap 26, Spike Gehlhausen crashed exiting turn 2, and came to rest along the outside wall on the backstretch. Leader Danny Ongais was in the pits when the yellow came out, which gave the lead temporarily to Steve Krisiloff. However, under the yellow light condition, Krisiloff violated the PACER light rules, and was penalized one lap. That gave the lead to Tom Sneva. With Ongais in second right behind Sneva, the green light came back on down the backstretch on lap 31. Sneva led for barely a lap, and Ongais passed him for the lead the next time by.

Salt Walther dropped out with a bad clutch, and proceeded to rant his frustration of his chief mechanic Tommy Smith during a heated television interview. It was reported that Smith made a change to the throttling system the night before the race; while Walther's team worked on repairing the car, Smith reportedly left the track, having parted ways with the team.

Danny Ongais led 68 of the first 75 laps. The team reported that Ongais had lost his two-way radio, and was forced to communicate only by sign boards for the rest of the race.

Al Unser Sr. took the lead for the first time on lap 76. He held the lead at the halfway point. A. J. Foyt, who had charged near the front early on, started to fade, and after long pit stops, was laps down to the leaders. Janet Guthrie, on the other hand, was moving up into the top ten.

=== Second half ===
Rookie Rick Mears dropped out after 103 laps with a blown engine. By lap 120, thirteen cars were out of the race, with hot conditions contributing to the attrition.

Al Unser Sr. led, with Danny Ongais and Tom Sneva in the top three. Unser continued to hold a small lead over Ongais, with his crew's efficient and quick pit stops increasing the margin.

Suddenly on lap 145, second place Danny Ongais came into the pits with smoke pouring from the car. After having led 71 laps (nearly half the race up to that point), Ongais was out with a blown engine.

=== Finish ===
Al Unser Sr. led second place Tom Sneva by over 20 seconds. Those were the only two cars left on the lead lap. On lap 180, Unser came onto the pits for his final stop. Unser overshot his pit box by a few feet, and hit a spare tire with his front wing. The team decided not to change tires, and filled the car with fuel only. His stop was 17 seconds, his worst pit stop of the day.

One lap later, Tom Sneva pitted, taking fuel only. His pit stop, however, was not fast, and he did not immediately gain ground on Unser. With a 30-second lead, Unser had 19 laps to go to victory. However, his front wing was reportedly damaged from hitting the tire, and Unser's handling was starting to go away. Sneva began cutting away at his lead, by about a second per lap.

With three laps to go, Sneva had cut the lead to 14 seconds. Then with one lap to go, it was down to 10 seconds. On the final lap, third place Gordon Johncock slipped by Unser to get one of his laps back. Unser nursed the car around on the final lap, and won this third Indy 500. Second place for the second year in a row, Tom Sneva finished 8.09 seconds behind. After the race, Unser claimed that he was merely 'taking it easy' over the final 20 laps, and that clipping the tire during his pit stop was not affecting his handing. In any case, it was the second-closest finish in Indy history to that point.

Wally Dallenbach and A. J. Foyt both stalled on the course out of fuel, but both finished strongly, 5th and 7th, respectively. Janet Guthrie finished 9th, and revealed after the race that she drove with a fractured wrist. Two days before the race, she fell during a charity tennis match, suffering the injury.

Late in the race, the Patrick Racing Wildcats of Gordon Johncock and Steve Krisiloff were penalized one lap by stewards - Johncock for running over an air-hose, and Krisiloff for speeding too fast under caution. If the penalties had not happened, Johncock would have barely finished runner-up behind Al Unser, and Krisiloff would have still finished fourth, but would have been the only driver one lap down. George Bignotti announced his intentions to protest Johncock's penalty, claiming that officials overlooked Unser running over his air hose, and did not treat both drivers equally. However, post-race footage showed that Unser, although coming very close, did not run over his air hose, and the team declined to protest.

== Box score ==
Finish	Grid	No	Name	Chassis	Engine	Laps	Status	Points
1	5	2	(United States) Al Unser W	Lola T500	Cosworth DFX	200	161.363 mph	1000
2	1	1	(United States) Tom Sneva	Penske PC-6	Cosworth DFX	200	+8.09	800
3	6	20	(United States) Gordon Johncock W	Wildcat 78	DGS	199	Flagged	700
4	13	40	(United States) Steve Krisiloff	Wildcat	DGS	198	Flagged	600
5	7	6	(United States) Wally Dallenbach Sr.	McLaren 77	Cosworth DFX	195	Out of fuel	500
6	19	48	(United States) Bobby Unser W	Eagle 78	Cosworth DFX	195	Flagged	400
7	20	14	(United States) A. J. Foyt W	Coyote	Foyt V-8	191	Flagged	300
8	23	84	(United States) George Snider	Coyote	Foyt V-8	191	Flagged	250
9	15	51	(United States) Janet Guthrie	Wildcat	DGS	190	Flagged	0
10	8	16	(United States) Johnny Parsons	Lightning	Offenhauser	186	Flagged	150
11	30	35	(United States) Larry Rice R	Lightning	Offenhauser	186	Engine	100
12	33	7	(United States) Mario Andretti W	Penske PC-6	Cosworth DFX	185	Flagged	50
13	4	4	(United States) Johnny Rutherford W	McLaren 77	Cosworth DFX	180	Flagged	25
14	28	88	(United States) Jerry Karl	McLaren	Cosworth DFX	176	Flagged	25
15	24	69	(United States) Joe Saldana R	Eagle 73	Offenhauser	173	Flagged	25
16	31	98	(United States) Gary Bettenhausen	King 76	Offenhauser	147	Piston	25
17	25	78	(United States) Mike Mosley	Lightning	Offenhauser	146	Broken Gear	20
18	2	25	(United States) Danny Ongais	Parnelli	Cosworth DFX	145	Piston	20
19	10	17	(United States) Dick Simon	Vollstedt	Offenhauser	138	Wheel Bearing	20
20	26	26	(United States) Jim McElreath	Eagle 74	Offenhauser	132	Engine	20
21	18	43	(United States) Tom Bigelow	Wildcat 76	DGS	107	Connecting Rod	15
22	9	80	(United States) Larry Dickson	Penske PC-5	Cosworth DFX	104	Oil Pressure	15
23	3	71	(United States) Rick Mears R	Penske PC-6	Cosworth DFX	103	Engine	15
24	21	8	(United States) Pancho Carter	Lightning	Cosworth DFX	92	Exhaust Header	15
25	11	11	(United States) Roger McCluskey	Eagle 76	AMC	82	Clutch	10
26	17	39	(United States) John Mahler	Eagle	Offenhauser	58	Timing gear	10
27	14	22	(United States) Tom Bagley R	Watson 77	Offenhauser	25	Overheating	10
28	22	77	(United States) Salt Walther	McLaren	Cosworth DFX	24	Clutch	10
29	16	19	(United States) Spike Gehlhausen	Eagle 74	Offenhauser	23	Crash T2	5
30	29	47	(United States) Phil Threshie R	Lightning	Offenhauser	22	Oil Pressure	5
31	32	30	(United States) Jerry Sneva	McLaren	Offenhauser	18	Rear End	5
32	12	24	(United States) Sheldon Kinser	Watson	Offenhauser	15	Oil Pressure	5
33	27	29	(Canada) Cliff Hucul	McLaren	Offenhauser	4	Oil Line	5

W Former Indianapolis 500 winner

R Indianapolis 500 Rookie

All cars utilized Goodyear tires.

=== Race statistics ===
Lap Leaders
Laps	Leader
1–11	Danny Ongais
12	Tom Sneva
13–25	Danny Ongais
26–30	Steve Krisiloff
31	Tom Sneva
32–75	Danny Ongais
76–107	Al Unser Sr.
108–110	Danny Ongais
111–179	Al Unser Sr.
180	Tom Sneva
181– 200	Al Unser Sr.

Total laps led
Driver	Laps
Al Unser Sr.	121
Danny Ongais	71
Steve Krisiloff	5
Tom Sneva	3

PACER Yellow Light Periods
6 for 23 laps
Laps	Reason
2–4	Sheldon Kinser tow-in
9–11	Sheldon Kinser tow-in
26–31	Spike Gehlhausen crash turn 2
48–51	Debris
84–85	Debris
114–118	Rick Mears & Tom Bigelow tow-in

=== Points standings after the race ===
Rank	Driver	Points	Difference	Position Change
1	Tom Sneva	1725	Leader	+1
2	Gordon Johncock	1688	-37	0
3	Al Unser	1325	-400	+6
4	Steve Krisiloff	1150	-575	+1
5	A. J. Foyt	1078	-647	-1
6	Danny Ongais	1075	-650	-5
7	Wally Dallenbach	868	-857	-1
8	Bobby Unser	434	-1291	Outside top 20
9	Bobby Olivero	360	-1365	-2
9	Dick Simon	360	-1365	-1

== Broadcasting ==
=== Radio ===
The race was carried live on the IMS Radio Network. Paul Page served as anchor for the second year despite what happened on December 1, 1977. On that day while he was doing a helicopter traffic report, Page was nearly killed in an accident, as the helicopter he was riding aboard crashed near Speedway Senior High School in Speedway, Indiana. Page would fully recover to call the race. Lou Palmer reported from victory lane. Mike Hiss, who had served as a substitute driver for Mario Andretti during time trials, served as the "driver expert."

This would be the 31st and final year for Jim Shelton on the crew. After eleven previous appearances, Fred Agabashian also had departed from the crew.

Indianapolis Motor Speedway Radio Network
Booth Announcers	Turn Reporters	Pit/garage reporters
Chief Announcer: Paul Page; Driver expert: Mike Hiss; Statistician: John DeCamp; Historian: Donald Davidson	Turn 1: Ron Carrell; Turn 2: Howdy Bell; Backstretch: Darl Wible; Turn 3: Doug Zink; Turn 4: Jim Shelton	Jerry Baker (north pits); Chuck Marlowe (north-center pits); Luke Walton (south-center pits); Lou Palmer (south pits); Bob Forbes (garages)

=== Television ===
The race was carried in the United States on ABC Sports on a same-day tape delay basis. Billed as an "ABC Sports Exclusive," the race was introduced with the 1977 song African Symphony, written by Van McCoy, and performed by Saint Tropez. Jim McKay anchored the broadcast.

The broadcast has re-aired on ESPN Classic since May 2011.

The full race broadcast has been available since May 10, 2018 on the official IndyCar Series YouTube channel.

ABC Television
Booth Announcers	Pit/garage reporters
Host: Chris Schenkel; Announcer: Jim McKay; Color: Jackie Stewart	Chris Economaki; Bill Flemming; Sam Posey

== Gallery ==
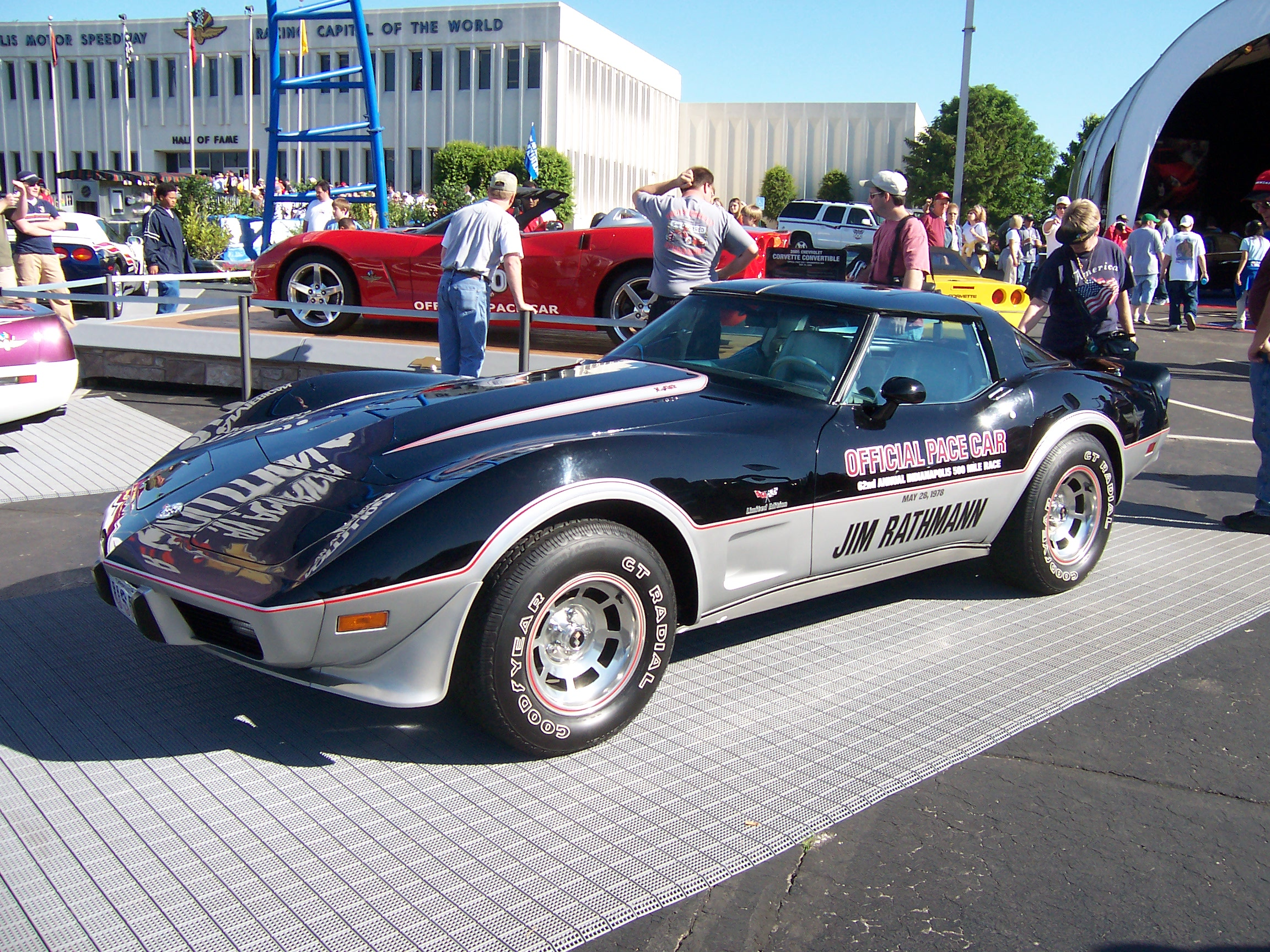
1978 Corvette pace car

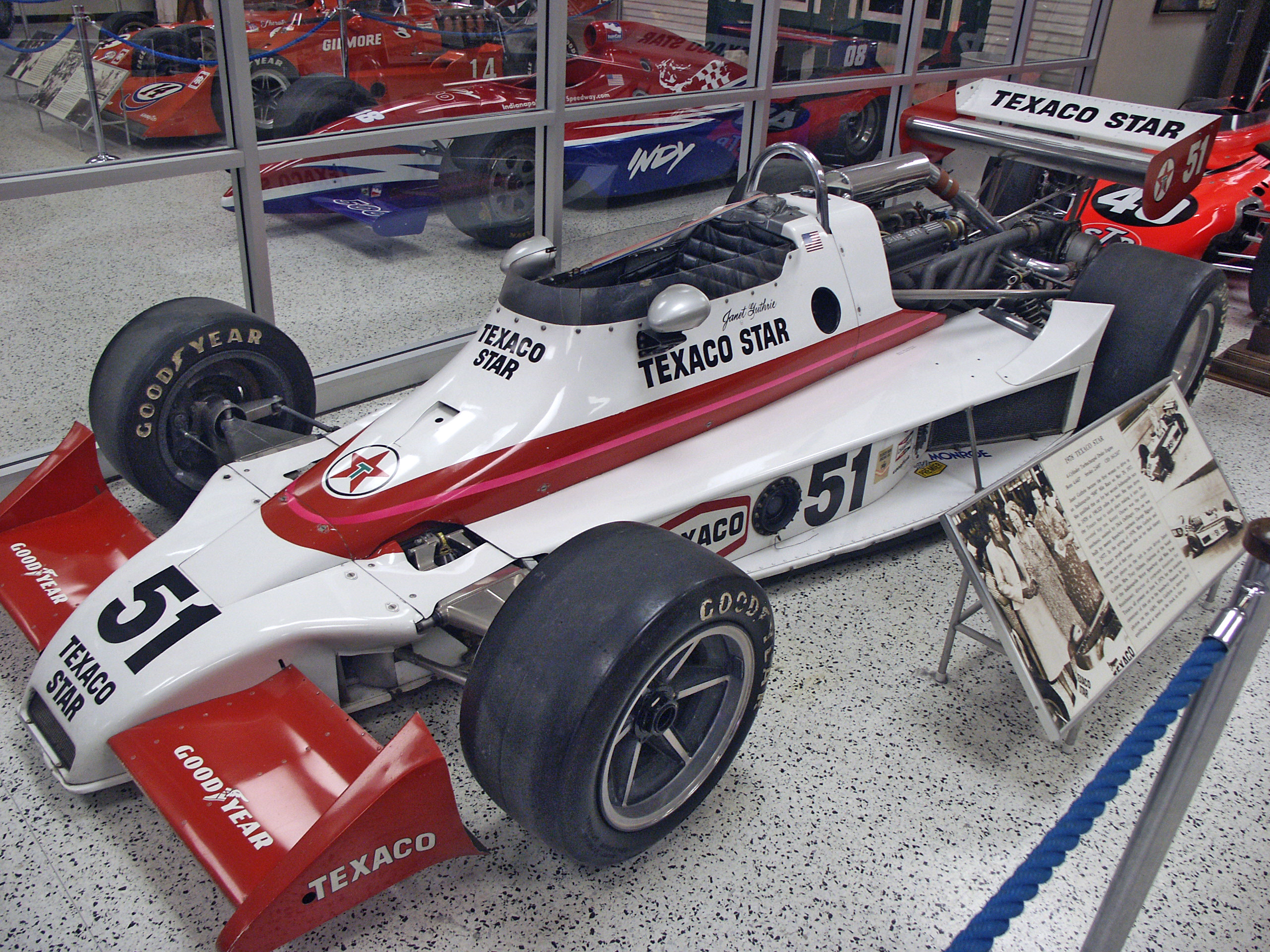
Janet Guthrie's 1978 entry

== Notes ==
=== See also ===
- 1978 USAC Championship Car season

=== Works cited ===
- 1978 Indianapolis 500 Official Track Report
- Indianapolis 500 History: Race & All-Time Stats – Official Site
- 1978 Indianapolis 500 Radio Broadcast, Indianapolis Motor Speedway Radio Network

1977 Indianapolis 500; A. J. Foyt	1978 Indianapolis 500; Al Unser	1979 Indianapolis 500; Rick Mears
