= 1979 Indianapolis 500 =

American motor race

63rd Indianapolis 500
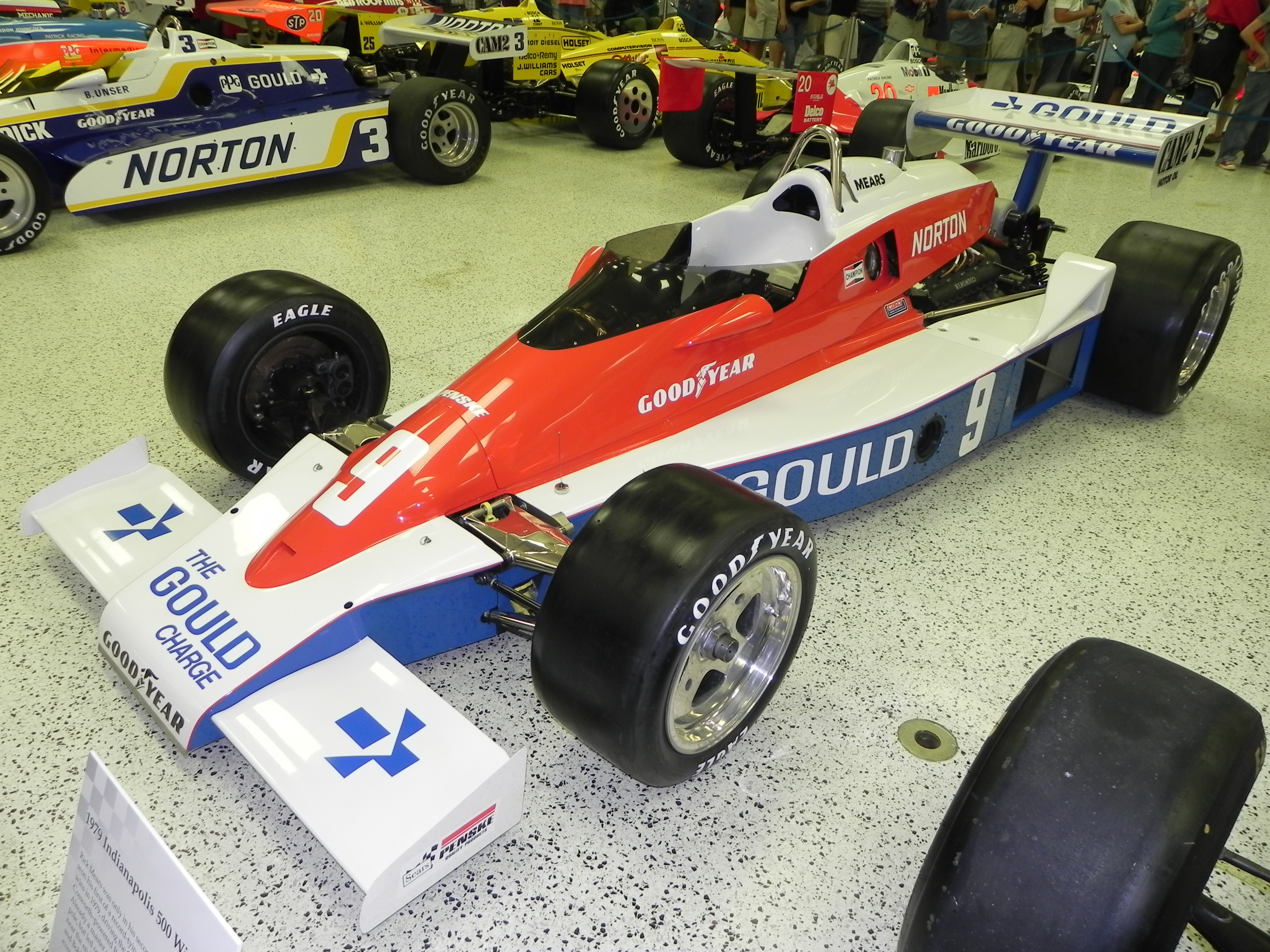

Indianapolis Motor Speedway

Indianapolis 500
- Sanctioning body: USAC
- Season: 1979 USAC; 1979 CART
- Date: May 27, 1979
- Winner: (United States) Rick Mears
- Winning team: Penske Racing
- Winning Chief Mechanic: Darrell Soppe
- Time of race: 3:08:47.97
- Average speed: 158.899 mph (255.723 km/h)
- Pole position: (United States) Rick Mears
- Pole speed: 193.736 mph (311.788 km/h)
- Fastest qualifier: (United States) Rick Mears
- Rookie of the Year: (United States) Howdy Holmes
- Most laps led: (United States) Bobby Unser (89)

Pre-race ceremonies
- National anthem: Purdue Band
- "Back Home Again in Indiana": Peter Marshall
- Starting command: Mary F. Hulman
- Pace car: Ford Mustang
- Pace car driver: Jackie Stewart
- Starter: Pat Vidan
- Estimated attendance: 350,000

Television in the United States
- Network: ABC
- Announcers: Jim McKay & Jackie Stewart
- Nielsen ratings: 13.5 / 24

Chronology
Previous	Next
1978	1980

The 63rd 500 Mile International Sweepstakes was held at the Indianapolis Motor Speedway in Speedway, Indiana, on Sunday May 27, 1979. Brothers Al and Bobby Unser combined to lead 174 of the 200 laps, but Al dropped out around the midpoint, and Bobby slipped to 5th place at the finish nursing mechanical issues. Al was driving Jim Hall's radically new Chaparral 2K ground effect chassis in its Indy debut. The car would be victorious the following year with Johnny Rutherford behind the wheel. Second-year driver Rick Mears took the lead for the final time with 18 laps to go, and won his first Indianapolis 500. Mears would win again in 1984, 1988, and 1991, to become the third driver (along with A. J. Foyt, Al Unser Sr., and later Hélio Castroneves) to win the Indy 500 a record four times. It was also Mears' first of a record six Indy 500 pole positions, a mark that still stands as of 2026.

The month of May 1979 was filled with controversy on and off the track. The race was sanctioned by USAC, and was part of the 1979 USAC National Championship. USAC had sanctioned the Indianapolis 500 and the sport of Indy car racing since 1956. During the offseason, however, several teams broke off and formed Championship Auto Racing Teams (CART), a new sanctioning body and new series for Indy cars. It was the beginning of the first open-wheel "split". For 1979, there would be two competing Indy car championships. Many participants took part in the inaugural 1979 SCCA/CART Indy Car Series, skipped the other USAC-sanctioned events, and entered the Indy 500 only as a one-off. USAC responded by rejecting the entries of several top CART-based teams. The owners immediately filed suit, and a court injunction was issued to allow them to participate. Technical squabbles also confounded the month. USAC had re-tooled the turbocharger boost rules, which drew the ire of some crews. During time trials, several cars were disqualified due to illegal wastegate exhaust pipes. Qualifying closed with the traditional 33 cars in the field. However, the day before the race a special qualifying session was arranged to allow certain entries a last chance to qualify. Two additional cars were added to the field, for a total of 35 cars (the most since 1933).

The high tensions and technical squabbles during the month attracted considerable negative criticism from sports writers and media. The race itself, however, was competitive and entertaining, and completed without major incident or further controversy.

Among those in attendance was former president Gerald Ford. Ford also served as the grand marshal of the 500 Festival Parade. The 1979 race is also notable in that it was the first to utilize the "pack-up" rule during caution periods, eliminating the then-primitive virtual safety car rules ("Electro-PACER") used from 1972 to 1978. On the onset of a caution period, the pace car would now pick up the leader and lead the field under the yellow flag at reduced speed. The remainder of the cars would "pack-up" or "bunch up" behind the leader.

== Race schedule ==
Race schedule — May 1979
Sun	Mon	Tue	Wed	Thu	Fri	Sat
		1	2	3	4	5 Opening Day
6 Practice	7 Practice	8 Practice	9 Practice	10; Practice	11; Practice	12; Pole Day
13; Time Trials	14; Practice	15; Practice	16; Practice	17; Practice	18; Practice	19; Time Trials
20; Time Trials	21	22	23	24; Carb Day	25; Mini-Marathon	26; Time Trials
27; Indy 500	28; Memorial Day	29	30	31		

Color	Notes
Green	Practice
Dark Blue	Time trials
Silver	Race day
Red	Rained out*
Blank	No track activity

* Includes days where track
activity was significantly
limited due to rain

- A fifth day of time trials (May 26) was added to resolve a controversy that arose during qualifying (see below).

== Controversies ==
=== Pop-off valves ===
Following the 1978 race, and after other superspeedway races that summer including Pocono and Ontario, competitors began complaining about the horsepower advantage that the newer V-8 engines (namely the Cosworth DFX) had over the venerable 4-cylinder Offenhauser engines. USAC held special meetings in August and September of that year to draft new turbocharger boost rules and engine regulations in an effort to establish an equivalency formula. In September, they released a series of preliminary rule changes for the 1979 season. All turbocharged engines would be permitted 80 inHg of boost, and pop-off valves would now be required during practice, qualifying, and during the race. Previously, pop-off valves were only affixed to the turbocharging system during official qualifications. The fuel allotment for 500-miles races was increased to 333 gallons (up from 280) of methanol, and rear wings were reduced from 43 inches to 36 inches. The increase in fuel allotment would reduce the necessary fuel mileage for the 500 miles to 1.5 miles per gallon.

In January 1979, however, another meeting was held to further iron out an equivalency formula. USAC met with several owners/chief mechanics including Smokey Yunick, Mike Devin, Bill Finley, Pat Patrick, as well as Cosworth founder Keith Duckworth. The rules were changed once again, though the competitors left the meeting claiming that USAC mostly ignored their technical input. The 161.7 cubic inches (2.650 L) turbocharged V-8 engines were reduced to only 50 inHG of "boost", while the 4-cylinder Offys would be permitted 55 inHG. Additionally, the 209.3 cubic inches (3.430 L) stock block engines were allowed 58 inHG. Normally aspirated engines were allowed a 219 cubic inches (3.59 L) displacement, but few if any were expected to be entered. By the month of May, USAC had tweaked the rules yet again, upping the Offenhauser's boost to 60 inHG, but keeping the V-8s at 50 inHg. With the lower boost levels overall, the increased fuel allotment rule was scrapped. Cars were again limited to 280 gallons of methanol for the 500 miles, which required an average of 1.8 miles per gallon to finish the race.

=== USAC/CART "Split" ===
Following the death of Indianapolis Motor Speedway president Tony Hulman in October 1977, owners and participants in Indy car racing were anxious to reorganize the sport. Just six months later, USAC lost several officials in a tragic plane crash. By mid-1978, a growing dissent amongst the participants was based on many factors, including poor promotion and low revenue. Indy Car events outside of the Indianapolis 500 were suffering from poor attendance, and few events were even televised. Robin Miller even accused the Speedway of offering a purse that was too low considering the stature of the event and the costs of racing at the time. Further complicating the issue were rumors that Goodyear was considering pulling out of the sport. The venerable 4-cylinder turbo Offenhauser (a favorite of the USAC-loyal teams) was at a horsepower disadvantage to the new V8 Cosworth DFX. USAC began retooling turbocharger boost rules to ensure the Offy and the "stock block" engines remained competitive, which caused new disagreements about equivalency formulas and favoritism.

Driver, owner, and advocate Dan Gurney published a white paper promulgating several complaints and charges against USAC and IMS, concluding that a new organization was necessary to ensure the success of Indy car racing into the future. In late 1978, several existing Indy car owners broke off and created Championship Auto Racing Teams (CART) with some initial assistance from the Sports Car Club of America (in order to be recognized by ACCUS). The seed of dissent had been growing for several years before the accident, and claims that the plane crash was an immediate cause for the 1979 USAC/CART "split" are considered for the most part unfounded.

The first major salvo was made on March 25, 1979, when the CART-based teams boycotted the USAC Datsun Twin 200 at Ontario Motor Speedway. A. J. Foyt, who at first sided with the CART contingent, retracted his loyalty, and crossed back over to the USAC side. After the boycott, Foyt suggested that USAC should penalize the CART-based teams, and refuse their entries to the Indy 500. Among the drivers affected were Bobby Unser, Al Unser, Johnny Rutherford, Danny Ongais, Gordon Johncock, Steve Krisiloff, and Wally Dallenbach – some of the top names in the sport.

Three days before the published deadline, CART president U. E. "Pat" Patrick delivered a block of 44 entries to the 1979 Indianapolis 500 for the CART-based teams. On April 19, however, the USAC board of directors voted unanimously to reject the entries of six key teams: Penske, Patrick, McLaren, Fletcher, Chaparral, and Gurney. These six teams (19 cars) were alleged to be "harmful to racing" and "not in good standing with USAC." USAC sent the owners a telegram informing them of the situation while they were participating in the CART race at Atlanta Motor Speedway, the Gould Twin Dixie 125s.

On April 26, the "rejected six" teams filed suit in the U.S. District Court for the Southern District of Indiana, requesting an injunction to allow the teams to compete in the 1979 Indy 500. They cited antitrust and restraint of trade. On May 5, judge James Ellsworth Noland issued the injunction, but restrained the teams from disrupting or interfering with the running of the event.

=== Illegal wastegate manifolds ===
Diagram illustrating wastegate "loophole" issue. d_{1} is equal to 1.470 inches, and d_{2} was equal to roughly 2.0 inches (or greater).

During the month, another controversy erupted regarding the technical regulations of the turbocharger wastegate. The specifications called for wastegate exhaust pipes to be a minimum of 1.470 inches (inside diameter). The standard pipe diameter was typically 2 or 2½ inches. In addition, USAC issued a last-minute ruling that in-car adjustments of the turbo boost dial would be banned during time trials.

A few teams discovered what they considered a "loophole" in the rules. They utilized a larger diameter wastegate pipe, but welded a washer somewhere inside of it that had a circular opening of exactly 1.470 inches. This had the effect of creating back pressure, in hopes of over-riding the pop-off valve, and thus over-boosting the engine, and increasing horsepower.

On May 19 (the third day of time trials) the cars of Dick Ferguson, Steve Krisiloff, and Tom Bigelow were disqualified and fined $5,000 because they "had altered their wastegate exhaust pipes by the addition of restrictions which significantly affect the air flow." USAC charged that the teams had tampered with the wastegate exhaust pipe, thus illegally over-riding the pop-off valve, and potentially over-boosting the engine. An appeal was made the next morning, but USAC denied the appeal. Furthermore, they released a memo which stated that any cars qualifying on Sunday May 20 must have unrestricted wastegate pipes that are exactly 1.470 inches in diameter or greater (no washers were allowed to be welded inside).

The ruling created controversy in the garage area, as a further examination of the rules showed a "gray area" regarding the inlet opening configuration. Several teams charged USAC with essentially changing the rules in the middle of qualifying. It was suggested that one or more cars had qualified on the first weekend (May 12–13) with the washer configuration unnoticed – a fact at that point which was unprovable and un-protestable, as any teams that had done so had immediately removed the pipes in question to avoid scrutiny.

The controversy ultimately led to a fifth day of time trials. On the day before the race (Saturday May 26) eleven entries that were identified as being denied a fair attempt to qualify were allowed to participate. Each car was allowed one attempt, and if they completed their run faster than the slowest car already in the field, they would qualify for the starting grid. The ruling allowed for a potential 44-car field on race day. Only two cars accomplished the feat, and they were added to the back of the grid for a field of 35 cars.

== Practice – Week 1 ==
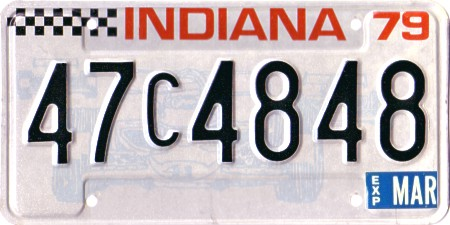
The 1978–79 Indiana license plate featured an Indy 500-related design

=== Saturday May 5 ===
Opening Day saw sparse activity. Only three cars took to the track, with Larry "Boom Boom" Cannon earning the honor of first car on the track. Later in the day, judge James Ellsworth Noland issued the injunction requested by the CART teams, and all entries were allowed to practice. Dick Simon, who was subpoenaed to testify downtown at the hearing, spent enough time at the track to run a lap of 174 mph (280 km/h), the fastest of the day.

=== Sunday May 6 ===
Hurley Haywood was the fastest of the day with a lap at 181.452 mph (292.019 km/h). The previously rejected CART teams arrived at the garage area, but none took to the track.

=== Monday May 7 ===
The "Rejected Six" CART teams took their first laps of the month, with Rick Mears turning the fastest lap of the day at 187.578 mph (301.878 km/h). Danny Ongais was a close second at 187.188 mph (301.250 km/h). Spike Gehlhausen had the only incident of the day, when a water line broke, spewing hot fluid into the cockpit. He suffered first and second degree burns, but was cleared to drive.

=== Tuesday May 8 ===
Mears ran the fastest speed of the month thus far, with a hand-timed lap of 193.5 mph (311.4 km/h).

=== Wednesday May 9 ===
A. J. Foyt moved to the top of the speed chart, completing a lap at 194.007 mph (312.224 km/h). Al Unser was second-fastest at 193.382 mph (311.218 km/h).

=== Thursday May 10 ===
Foyt bettered his speed from Wednesday at 194.890 mph (313.645 km/h), maintaining his grasp on the fastest lap of the month.

=== Friday May 11 ===
Bobby Unser became the latest driver over 190 mph (310 km/h), and Al Unser Sr. was the fastest of the afternoon at 193.341 mph (311.152 km/h). Moisture kept the track closed until 1:10 p.m., meaning only 2 hours and 10 minutes were lost due to weather all month thus far. Foyt finished the week with the top practice speed, and Mears had several hand-timed laps in the 193 mph (311 km/h) range.

== Time Trials – Weekend 1 ==
=== Pole Day – Saturday May 12 ===
Rain kept the track closed on pole day until after 4 p.m. At 4:19 p.m., the track opened for practice, with the temperature 55 °F (13 °C) and winds up to 12 mph (19 km/h). During the first practice session, Danny Ongais, a favorite for the front row, wrecked in turn 4 after completing a lap of 191.205 mph (307.715 km/h). He was pinned in the car for over twenty minutes, and suffered a concussion. He was taken to Methodist Hospital for observation, and returned to his home in Costa Mesa, California, for a few days to recuperate.

The crash by Ongais kept the track closed for 40 minutes as crews extricated him from the car and cleaned up the debris. Two other yellows closed the track for another ten minutes, and the day came to a close at 6 p.m. without a single car being able to make a qualifying attempt.

=== Second Day – Sunday May 13 ===
Pole qualifying shifted to Sunday, with partly sunny skies and temperatures in the mid-60s. Due to the new technical rules for 1979, including pop-off valve settings and wastegate regulations, the speeds in time trials were not expected to reach those set in 1977–1978 (over 200 mph (320 km/h)). A hectic, non-stop day of qualifying occurred, with no less than 45 cars pulling away for qualifying attempts.

Johnny Rutherford was the first driver to complete a run at 188.137 mph (302.777 km/h), and became the coveted 'first driver in the field.' Wally Dallenbach was the next car out, and temporarily put himself on the pole with a speed of 188.285 mph (303.015 km/h). Shortly before 1 p.m. Al Unser Sr. took over the provisional pole position with a four-lap average of 192.503 mph (309.804 km/h). A little over an hour later, Al's brother Bobby Unser put himself temporarily in second position at 189.913 mph (305.635 km/h).

At 4 p.m., Tom Sneva (who won the pole position in 1977–1978) took to the track looking for his record third consecutive Indy 500 pole. He took over the top spot with a four-lap average of 192.998 mph (310.600 km/h). There were only two cars left in line with a legitimate shot for the pole: A. J. Foyt and Rick Mears.

At 4:32 p.m., Foyt's run of 189.613 mph (305.153 km/h) was far short of being fast enough for the pole, but secured him a spot in row 2. The final qualifier for the pole round was Rick Mears. His four-lap average of 193.736 mph (311.788 km/h) won him his first of what would be record six career Indy 500 pole positions. Sneva was bumped to second on the grid.

At 4:50 p.m., the original pole qualifying round was over, and "Second Day" qualifying commenced. At the end of the day, the field was filled to 25 cars.

== Practice – Week 2 ==
=== Monday May 14 ===
USAC announced that for the first time, the "pack-up rule" would be used during caution periods at the Indy 500. Like the format used in NASCAR and at other Indy car races, when the caution flag came out, the pace car would enter the track and pick up the leader. The remainder of the field would bunch up behind the pace car. The previous system, the Electro-PACER Light system, was scrapped.

Johnny Rutherford, who was already in the field, posted the fastest lap at 192.185 mph (309.292 km/h). Bobby Unser shook down a Penske back-up car, which some speculated would be for Mario Andretti. Andretti was participating in Formula One full-time in 1979 to defend his 1978 World Championship, and a scheduling conflict with Monaco was expected to keep Mario away from Indy in 1979.

=== Tuesday May 15 ===
Vern Schuppan was the fastest of the non-qualified drivers at 181.561 mph (292.194 km/h). Bobby Unser continued to practice in the back-up car, but insisted it was to test nose configurations and not being prepared for another driver.

=== Wednesday May 16 ===
Eldon Rasmussen crashed in turn three, but was not injured. Later, Roger Rager spun in turn 3, but did not make contact. Johnny Rutherford was the fastest of the day at 191.775 mph (308.632 km/h).

=== Thursday May 17 ===
Billy Engelhart wrecked in turn 1, suffering a broken leg, and was sidelined for the rest of the month. Speeds dropped off for the day, with A. J. Foyt having the best lap of the day at 189.036 mph (304.224 km/h). Heavy activity amongst the numerous non-qualified cars was noted.

=== Friday May 18 ===
The final full day of practice saw heavy activity with no incidents reported. Danny Ongais returned to the track to get ready to qualify, but Dr. Thomas A. Hanna, the Speedway medical director, would not clear him to drive for the day.

Despite some unfounded rumors circulating around the garage area, Mario Andretti decided not to skip Monaco, and would miss the Indy 500 for the first time since arriving as a rookie in 1965. Meanwhile, Indy rookie and NASCAR regular Neil Bonnett flew to Dover to qualify for the Mason-Dixon 500. He planned on putting in a qualifying time for the Winston Cup race on Friday, then returning Saturday to Indianapolis in order to qualify for the Indy 500. However, it rained in Dover on Friday, washing out Cup qualifying. NASCAR qualifying was shifted to Saturday, and due to the time constraints, Bonnett decided to withdraw from Indy. Jerry Sneva took over the car. Bonnett went on to win the Dover NASCAR race, and never returned to Indy.

== Time Trials – Weekend 2 ==
=== Third Day – Saturday May 19 ===
The third day of time trials saw heavy activity. The day opened with 8 spots available on the grid. Hurley Haywood was the first car to go out, and he ran his first lap over 190 mph (310 km/h). His second and third laps, however, dropped off drastically, and his crew waved off.

Several cars went out in the first hour, and at 1:15 p.m., Jim McElreath filled the field to 33 cars. Larry Cannon was the first car on the bubble. Dick Simon bumped him out with ease. Tom Bigelow was now on the bubble. He survived three wave offs, but Jerry Sneva managed to bump him out at 2 p.m. Jerry Sneva's run was not without excitement, as he suffered a stuck throttle. Rather than wave off, he managed to control the engine with the kill switch, and completed the four laps without incident.

With John Martin now on the bubble, Dick Ferguson took to the track. His speed of 184.644 mph (297.156 km/h) bumped Martin from the field. However, in post-inspection, Ferguson was disqualified and fined $5,000 for an illegal wastegate inlet. Rather than welding a washer inside of the wastegate like others had done, his mechanic Wayne Woodward had welded a complete obstruction in the pipe, attempting to illegally over-ride the popoff valve. Martin was re-instated to the field. Meanwhile, Tom Bigelow bumped out Steve Krisiloff as this was going on.

Martin didn't last long, as Steve Krisiloff got into his backup car and bumped him out a few minutes later. The day concluded with Larry Rice bumping out John Mahler.

After the track closed, USAC disqualified Steve Krisiloff and Tom Bigelow for the same infraction that Dick Ferguson was disqualified for earlier – illegal wastegate exhaust pipes and attempting to over-ride the pop-off valve. As a result, the bumped cars of John Mahler and John Martin were re-instated to the field.

=== Bump Day – Sunday May 20 ===
After the disqualification of three cars on Saturday, USAC issued a memo clarifying their wastegate specifications. Some teams began to voice their complaints that it was not fair for USAC to essentially change the rules midway through time trials. With the increased scrutiny on the wastegate inlets, drivers claimed it was difficult for a legal car to bump out a car already in the field that had cheated, and that the officials were not policing it properly.

The final day scheduled for qualifying began on time around noon. Bill Alsup was the first car to make an attempt, and John Martin was bumped out of the field once again. Danny Ongais, who returned to the cockpit after his crash last weekend, followed suit by "re-bumping" John Mahler. Ongais had complained that USAC officials were deliberately preventing him from returning to the cockpit after his injury. However, after lobbying from his co-competitor and friend Al Unser, officials finally cleared him to drive.

Tom Bigelow and Steve Krisiloff, both whom were disqualified on Saturday, returned to the track, and bumped their way into the field. Dick Ferguson, however, was too slow, and exhausted his three attempts. Further complicating the day, USAC disqualified Bill Alsup for using the same engine that Bobby Unser had already qualified with.

The day ended with John Mahler taking the track at 5:59 p.m., and bumping his way back into the field.

== Carburetion Day ==
After qualifying was closed, eight teams that failed to qualify filed a protest on Monday May 21. They charged that the turbocharger wastegate inlet rules were unfair, and there was too much of a gray area to begin with. In addition, they claimed that many cars that qualified during the first weekend of time trials were technically illegal, but that officials were only closely checking the cars that made attempts on the second weekend. The protest was denied, but USAC president Dick King announced that the 11 cars that were bumped from the field would be allowed to participate in a special qualifying session if all 33 cars in the field signed a special agreement. Dick Ferguson was not among the 11 drivers named as eligible for the special session, so his car owner filed suit in county court on Tuesday to have the race halted until his car was re-instated. Part of the suit called for all 33 qualified cars to be summoned to court to have their wastegate pipes measured. The suit was dropped.

The final practice session was scheduled for Thursday May 24. Gordon Johncock led the speed chart with a lap of 192.555 mph (309.887 km/h). A total of 34 cars took laps, without any major incidents. Howdy Holmes blew an engine, Mike Mosley blew a transmission, and Salt Walther suffered a broken oil scavenger pump.

Of the 33 cars thus qualified, 31 took practice laps. Bill Vukovich II and Dana Carter were assigned as the alternates, and both took practice laps as well. Bob Harkey, however, was not eligible to practice, and pulled out on the track anyway. USAC officials black-flagged him, and made him return to the garage area.

By mid-day Thursday, only 31 of the 33 cars in the field signed the waiver agreeing to extend time trials. The proposal offered Monday was considered void since two teams refused to sign on.

=== Pit Stop Contest ===
The elimination rounds for the 3rd annual Miller Pit Stop Contest were held on Thursday May 24. Qualifying rounds were held on May 16–17. Teams were required to change two tires and simulate a fuel coupling. The top eight teams advanced to the elimination bracket. Johnny Rutherford (Team McLaren) defeated Cliff Hucul in the semifinals, then defeated Tom Sneva in the final round to win the event. It was McLaren's second consecutive victory in the Pit Stop Contest.

Qualifying Round
Rank	Driver	Team	Time
1	Johnny Rutherford	Team McLaren	11.94
2	Tom Sneva	O'Connell Racing	17.13
3	Salt Walther	Dayton-Walther	17.17
4	Janet Guthrie	Sherman Armstrong	17.50
5	Bill Vukovich II	Bob Wilke/Thermo King	22.57
6	Joe Saldana	Hoffman Auto Racing	23.45
7	Cliff Hucul	Arizona Motor Sports	22.48
8	Tom Bigelow	Sherman Armstrong	25.00
—	Dana Carter	Fred Ruth	Alternate
—	Bill Puterbaugh	Medlin	Alternate

Finals
4	Johnny Rutherford (Team McLaren)	13.00
1	Tom Sneva (O'Connell Racing)	23.20

== Special Qualifying Session – Saturday May 26 ==
On Friday May 25, USAC reversed their decision, and declared that in the best interest of the event, they would hold a special qualifying session Saturday morning for the 11 cars that were bumped from the field. The 33 cars that were already in the field were "locked in," and could not be bumped. Each of the eleven cars would be allowed only one attempt. There were no wave offs allowed, and if the run was incomplete, or if the driver missed their turn in line, the attempt was forfeited. If the driver completed the four-lap qualifying run faster than the slowest car in the field (Roger McCluskey at 183.908 mph (295.971 km/h)), he would be added to the rear of the grid. That potentially meant that up to a record 44 cars could start on race day.

Only two cars, Bill Vukovich II and George Snider ran fast enough, and the final grid comprised 35 cars. Despite the record number of entries and expanded field, only one rookie, Howdy Holmes, qualified for the race. He would win the rookie of the year award by default.

== Grid ==
Row	Inside		Middle		Outside	
1	9	(United States) Rick Mears; Gould Charge; Team Penske; Penske PC-6, Cosworth DFX; 193.736 mph	1	(United States) Tom Sneva; Sugaripe Prune; Jerry O'Connell; McLaren, Cosworth DFX; 192.998 mph	2	(United States) Al Unser W Pennzoil; Chaparral Racing; Chaparral, Cosworth DFX; 192.503 mph
2	12	(United States) Bobby Unser W Norton Spirit; Team Penske; Penske PC-7, Cosworth DFX; 189.913 mph	3	(United States) Gordon Johncock W North American Van Lines; Patrick Racing; Penske PC-6, Cosworth DFX; 189.753 mph	14	(United States) A. J. Foyt W Gilmore Racing; A. J. Foyt Enterprises; Parnelli, Cosworth DFX; 189.613 mph
3	6	(United States) Wally Dallenbach Sr. Foreman Industries; Patrick Racing; Penske PC-6, Cosworth DFX; 188.285 mph	4	(United States) Johnny Rutherford W Budweiser; Team McLaren; McLaren, Cosworth DFX; 188.137 mph	15	(United States) Johnny Parsons; Hopkins-Goodyear; Lindsey Hopkins; Lightning, DGS; 187.813 mph
4	24	(United States) Sheldon Kinser; Genesee Beer; Ralph Wilke; Watson, Offenhauser; 186.674 mph	89	(United States) Lee Kunzman; Vetter/Windjammer; Conqueste Racing Team; Parnelli, Cosworth DFX; 186.403 mph	36	(United States) Mike Mosley; Theodore Racing; All American Racers; Eagle, Cosworth DFX; 186.278 mph
5	46	(United States) Howdy Holmes R Armstrong Moulding; Sherman Armstrong; Wildcat, Offenhauser; 185.864 mph	45	(United States) Janet Guthrie; Texaco Star; Sherman Armstrong; Lola 79, Cosworth DFX; 185.720 mph	11	(United States) Tom Bagley; Dairy Queen/Kent Oil; Bobby Hillin; Penske PC-6, Cosworth DFX; 185.414 mph
6	77	(United States) Salt Walther; Dayton-Walther; George Walther; Penske PC-6, Cosworth DFX; 184.162 mph	10	(United States) Pancho Carter; Alex XLNT Foods; Alex Morales; Lightning, Cosworth DFX; 185.806 mph	29	(Canada) Cliff Hucul; Hucul Racing; Emil Hucul; McLaren, Offenhauser; 186.200 mph
7	23	(United States) Jim McElreath; AMAX Coal; Jim McElreath; Penske PC-6, Cosworth DFX; 185.833 mph	17	(United States) Dick Simon; Sanyo; Rolla Vollstedt; Vollstedt, Offenhauser; 185.071 mph	73	(United States) Jerry Sneva; National Engineering; Warner Hodgdon; Spirit 78, AMC V-8; 184.379 mph
8	34	(Australia) Vern Schuppan; Wysard Motors; Herb Wysard; Wildcat, DGS; 184.341 mph	31	(United States) Larry Rice; S&M Electric Company; S&M Electric Company; Lightning, Offenhauser; 184.219 mph	80	(United States) Larry Dickson; Polak Construction; Russ Polak; Penske PC-5, Cosworth DFX; 184.181 mph
9	72	(United States) Roger McCluskey; National Engineering; Warner Hodgdon; McLaren, Cosworth DFX; 183.908 mph	69	(United States) } Joe Saldana; KBHL-FM; Hoffman Racing; Eagle, Offenhauser; 188.778 mph	25	(United States) Danny Ongais; Interscope/Panasonic; Ted Field; Parnelli, Cosworth DFX; 188.009 mph
10	7	(United States) Steve Krisiloff; Frosty Acres; Robert Fletcher; Lightning, Cosworth DFX; 186.287 mph	97	(United States) Phil Threshie; Guiffre Bros; Grant King; King 76, Chevy; 185.854 mph	44	(United States) Tom Bigelow; Armstrong Moulding; Sherman Armstrong; Lola 79, Cosworth DFX; 185.147 mph
11	19	(United States) Spike Gehlhausen; Sta-On Car Glaze; Carl Gehlhausen; Wildcat, Cosworth DFX; 185.061 mph	92	(United States) John Mahler; Sport Magazine; Intercomp; Eagle, Offenhauser; 184.322 mph	50	(United States) Eldon Rasmussen; Bivouac Vans; BFM Enterprises; Antares, Offenhauser; 183.927 mph
12	22	(United States) Bill Vukovich II; Hubler Chevrolet/WNDE; Ralph Wilke; Watson, Offenhauser; 187.042 mph	59	(United States) George Snider; KBHL; Hoffman Racing; Lightning, Offenhauser; 185.319 mph		

=== Failed to Qualify ===
==== Alternates ====
- Bill Vukovich II (#22) – Bumped; Qualified for field during special qualifying session
- Dana Carter R (#30) – Bumped

==== Special qualifying session participants ====
- Al Loquasto (#39) – 183.318 mph; Too slow
- Dana Carter R (#30) – 182.964 mph; Too slow
- John Martin (#20) – 182.463 mph; Too slow
- Jerry Karl (#38) – Incomplete run during special time trials session
- Larry "Boom Boom" Cannon (#95) – Incomplete run during special time trials session
- Bill Alsup R (#19, #41, #68 – Disqualified) – Wrecked during special time trials session

==== Others ====
- Dick Ferguson R (#81) – Owner went to court to overturn disqualification; unsuccessful
- Todd Gibson R (#75) – Wrecked on third and final qualifying attempt
- Tom Frantz R (#16) – Spun during qualifying attempt
- Billy Scott (#28) – Waved off
- Hurley Haywood R (#51) – Too slow
- Gary Bettenhausen (#44, #98) – Too slow
- Jim Hurtubise (#56) – Incomplete Run
- Bill Puterbaugh (#35) – Incomplete run
- Neil Bonnett R (#73) – Blew engine morning of qualifying, did not make attempt
- Billy Engelhart R (#83) – Wrecked in practice, broken leg
- Frank Weiss R (#50) – Incomplete rookie test
- Tony Bettenhausen Jr. R (#23, #26)
- Earle Canavan R
- Ed Finley R (#62)
- Woody Fisher R (#52)
- Bob Harkey (#19)
- Larry McCoy (#93)
- Jerry Miller R (#97)
- Jan Opperman (#81)
- Roger Rager R (#66)

R = Indianapolis 500 rookie
W = Former Indianapolis 500 winner

== Race summary ==
Ticket stub

=== First half ===
Rain fell the night before the race, and the weather forecast for race day was bleak. However, in the morning, the skies cleared, the track dried, and the race began on-time as scheduled.

At the start, Al Unser Sr. swept from the outside of the front row, and led the field into turn one. Unser was driving Jim Hall's radical new Chaparral 2K chassis. He pulled out to a commanding lead, and proceeded to lead the first 24 laps. Heavy attrition early on saw seven cars out with mechanical problems (Janet Guthrie the most notable) by lap 22.

Cliff Hucul stalled on lap 28, bringing out the first caution during the first sequence of pit stops, ushering in the modern era of caution flag/yellow light procedures. As the field went back to green, Al Unser again dominated. On lap 43, Wally Dallenbach lost a wheel down the backstretch, and had to precariously guide his car back to the pits on three wheels. The car was too heavily damaged to continue however.

With Al Unser still dominating, the rest of the top five was Rick Mears, Bobby Unser, and Johnny Rutherford.

Rutherford then headed to the pits with a broken gear. After lengthy repairs, he returned to the race. Leader Al Unser came in for a routine pit stop under the caution on lap 97. Moments later, he was back into the pits after it was reported that something may have been leaking or smoking from the back of the car. Still under the caution, after a quick consultation, Unser returned to the track. The green flag back came out with Bobby Unser now leading.

=== Second half ===
On lap 103, Al Unser Sr. was running second to Bobby Unser when heavy smoke and flames started coming from the back of the car. The Chaparral 2K experienced a failed transmission oil fitting, and Unser was out of the race. After mutual differences, Unser decided to leave the team at the end of the season. In two seasons with the Jim Hall team Unser had won three out of six five hundred mile races (all 3 500 mile races in 1978) giving him a 50% win rate for five hundred mile race wins in two years.

With Al out, his brother Bobby was now in control. Rick Mears was holding second, and A. J. Foyt was moving up to third, one lap down.

The first crash of the day involved Larry Rice on lap 156.

With twenty laps to go, Bobby Unser led his Penske teammate Rick Mears by a few car lengths. A. J. Foyt was running third, one lap down. Suddenly on lap 181, Bobby Unser veered to the inside of the track. He was off the pace with gearbox trouble. That handed the lead to Rick Mears with 19 laps to go. Less than a lap later, A. J. Foyt (now in second) got by Mears to un-lap himself. Bobby Unser would stay out on the track and nursed his ailing car to a 5th-place finish in third gear.

=== Finish ===
Rick Mears made his final pit stop from the lead on lap 185. He took on fuel only, and no tires. A. J. Foyt followed, completing a fast 8.5-second pit stop. The leaders pits stops were over, and Mears now held a 38-second lead over Foyt.

Suddenly with 8 laps to go, Tom Sneva wrecked in turn four, bringing out the yellow, and bunching up the field. The green came back out for one last sprint to the finish with four laps to go. Rick Mears led, with A. J. Foyt at the tail-end of the pack. Mike Mosley was one lap down in third place, however, an early-race scoring error was tentatively showing him two laps down in 5th place. Foyt was mired in heavy traffic, and needed to pass at least 14 cars to catch up to Mears. With Foyt struggling to make up the ground, his engine lost a cylinder. Down on power, Foyt began to slow. Third-place Mosley, fighting to stay ahead of fourth-place Danny Ongais, un-lapped himself on the final lap and continued to charge. Meanwhile, Mears cruised unchallenged to the finish line. Mears in only his second start, won his first of four Indy 500 victories.

Coming off of turn four with the checkered flag waving, A. J. Foyt's engine quit. He pulled to the inside and was coasting down the frontstretch towards the finish line. Mike Mosley was storming down the frontstretch at full speed, but Foyt nipped him at the finish line by 2.3 seconds to hold on to second position. Though it was not known at the moment, Mosley's charge on the final lap nearly gave him second place. After the race, officials discovered a scoring error, and realized that Mosley was not credited with a lap at the start of the race. In the official results, Mosley was credited with third place, just behind Foyt.

Bill Vukovich II, who was one of only two drivers to make the field during the special Saturday qualifying session, charged all the way from 34th starting position to 8th at the finish.

Born in 1951, Rick Mears became the first Indy 500 winner born after World War II. It was also the last checkered flag for USAC chief starter/flagman Pat Vidan. This would be the final Indianapolis 500 participation for Team McLaren who left Indy car racing as a team all together until their return in 2017.

== Box score ==
Finish	Start	No	Name	Chassis	Engine	Qual	Laps	Status	Points
1	1	9	(United States) Rick Mears	Penske PC-6	Cosworth	193.736	200	158.889 mph	1000†
2	6	14	(United States) A. J. Foyt W	Parnelli	Cosworth	189.613	200	+45.69 seconds	800‡
3	12	36	(United States) Mike Mosley	Eagle	Cosworth	186.278	200	+48.03 seconds	700†
4	27	25	(United States) Danny Ongais	Parnelli	Cosworth	188.009	199	Flagged	600†
5	4	12	(United States) Bobby Unser W	Penske PC-7	Cosworth	189.913	199	Flagged	500†
6	5	3	(United States) Gordon Johncock W	Penske PC-6	Cosworth	189.753	197	Flagged	400†
7	13	46	(United States) Howdy Holmes R	Wildcat	Cosworth	185.864	195	Flagged	300‡
8	34	22	(United States) Bill Vukovich II	Watson	Offenhauser	187.042	194	Flagged	250‡
9	15	11	(United States) Tom Bagley	Penske PC-6	Cosworth	185.414	193	Flagged	200†
10	31	19	(United States) Spike Gehlhausen	Wildcat	Cosworth	185.061	192	Flagged	150†
11	28	7	(United States) Steve Krisiloff	Lightning	Offenhauser	186.287	192	Flagged	100†
12	16	77	(United States) Salt Walther	Penske PC-6	Cosworth	184.162	191	Flagged	50†
13	25	72	(United States) Roger McCluskey	McLaren M24	Cosworth	183.908	191	Flagged	25‡
14	30	44	(United States) Tom Bigelow	Lola T500	Cosworth	185.147	190	Flagged	25‡
15	2	1	(United States) Tom Sneva	McLaren M24	Cosworth	192.999	188	Crash T4	25†
16	26	69	(United States) Joe Saldana	Eagle	Offenhauser	188.778	186	Flagged	25†
17	29	97	(United States) Phil Threshie	King	Chevrolet	185.855	172	Flagged	20‡
18	8	4	(United States) Johnny Rutherford W	McLaren M24	Cosworth	188.137	168	Flagged	20†
19	23	31	(United States) Larry Rice	Lightning	Offenhauser	184.218	142	Crash T2	20†
20	17	10	(United States) Pancho Carter	Lightning	Offenhauser	185.806	129	Wheel Bearing	20†
21	22	34	(Australia) Vern Schuppan	Wildcat	DGS	184.341	111	Transmission	15†
22	3	2	(United States) Al Unser W	Chaparral 2K	Cosworth	192.503	104	Transmission	15†
23	33	50	(Canada) Eldon Rasmussen	Antares	Offenhauser	183.927	89	Header Pipe	15‡
24	24	80	(United States) Larry Dickson	Penske PC-5	Cosworth	184.181	86	Fuel Pump	10‡
25	32	92	(United States) John Mahler	Eagle	Offenhauser	184.322	66	Fuel Pump	10†
26	20	17	(United States) Dick Simon	Vollstedt	Offenhauser	185.071	57	Clutch	10‡
27	7	6	(United States) Wally Dallenbach Sr.	Penske PC-6	Cosworth	188.285	43	Lost Wheel	10†
28	10	24	(United States) Sheldon Kinser	Watson	Offenhauser	186.674	40	Piston	10‡
29	18	29	(Canada) Cliff Hucul	McLaren M24	Offenhauser	186.200	22	Rod	5‡
30	11	89	(United States) Lee Kunzman	Parnelli	Cosworth	186.403	18	Scavenger Pump	5†
31	21	73	(United States) Jerry Sneva	Spirit	AMC	184.379	16	Piston	5‡
32	9	15	(United States) Johnny Parsons	Lightning	Offenhauser	187.813	16	Piston	5‡
33	35	59	(United States) George Snider	Lightning	Offenhauser	185.319	7	Fuel Pump	5‡
34	14	45	(United States) Janet Guthrie	Lola T500	Cosworth	185.720	3	Piston	0‡
35	19	23	(United States) Jim McElreath	Penske PC-6	Cosworth	185.880	0	Valves	0‡

W Former Indianapolis 500 winner

R Indianapolis 500 Rookie

All cars utilized Goodyear tires.

† Indicates diver eligible for CART Championship points only.

‡ Indicates driver eligible for USAC Championship Trail points only.

=== Race statistics ===
Lap Leaders
Laps	Leader
1–24	Al Unser Sr.
25–27	Rick Mears
28	A. J. Foyt
29–69	Al Unser Sr.
70–73	Bobby Unser
74–76	Rick Mears
77–96	Al Unser Sr.
97–181	Bobby Unser
182–200	Rick Mears

Total laps led
Driver	Laps
Bobby Unser	89
Al Unser Sr.	85
Rick Mears	25
A. J. Foyt	1

Caution Periods
6 for 34 laps (50 minutes, 40 seconds)
Laps	Reason
28–31	Cliff Hucul tow-in
43–48	Sheldon Kinser tow-in
93–99	Larry Dickson tow-in
103–107	Phil Threshie tow-in
156–162	Larry Rice crash turn 2
192–196	Tom Sneva crash in turn 4

=== Championship standings ===
Points championship standings after this race. Top ten are listed.

SCCA/CART Indy Car Series
Rank	Driver	Points	Diff
1	Rick Mears	1,565	
2	Gordon Johncock	900	−665
3	Bobby Unser	875	−690
4	Mike Mosley	830	−735
5	Johnny Rutherford	730	−835
6	Danny Ongais	713	−852
7	Al Unser	470	−1,095
8	Tom Bagley	413	−1,152
9	Tom Sneva	331	−1,234
10	Lee Kunzman	270	−1,295

USAC Championship Trail
Rank	Driver	Points	Diff
1	A. J. Foyt	1600	
2	Billy Vukovich Jr.	690	-910
3	Cliff Hucul	445	-1155
4	Sheldon Kinser	350	-1250
5	Johnny Parsons	335	-1265
6	Gary Bettenhausen	328	-1272
7	George Snider	305	-1295
7	Larry Dickson	305	-1295
9	Howdy Holmes	300	-1300
10	Tom Bigelow	205	-1395

== Broadcasting ==
=== Radio ===
The race was carried live on the IMS Radio Network. Paul Page served as anchor for the third year. Lou Palmer reported from victory lane. Billy Scott, who failed to qualify for the race, served as the "driver expert."

After 31 years on the broadcast, fourth turn reporter Jim Shelton retired from the crew. Bob Jenkins debuted on the backstretch, while Darl Wible moved to the vacant turn four position. Bob Forbes' primary duties again involved covering the garage area and roving reports. For 1979, a third level was added to the Turn Two Suites. Howdy Bell's vantage point on the roof of the suites building moved slightly higher than previous years.

Indianapolis Motor Speedway Radio Network
Booth Announcers	Turn Reporters	Pit/garage reporters
Chief Announcer: Paul Page; Driver expert: Billy Scott; Statistician: John DeCamp; Historian: Donald Davidson	Turn 1: Ron Carrell; Turn 2: Howdy Bell; Backstretch: Bob Jenkins R Turn 3: Doug Zink; Turn 4: Darl Wible	Jerry Baker (north pits); Luke Walton (north-center pits); Chuck Marlowe (south-center pits); Lou Palmer (south pits); Bob Forbes (garages)

=== Television ===
The race was carried in the United States on ABC Sports on a same-day tape delay basis. On-air color commentator Jackie Stewart was selected to drive the pace car at the start of the race. Stewart reported live while driving the Ford Mustang pace car. Sam Posey was absent from the broadcast, as he was in Monte Carlo for coverage of the Monaco Grand Prix, to be aired on ABC's Wide World of Sports the following weekend.

The broadcast has re-aired on ESPN Classic since May 2011.

ABC Television
Booth Announcers	Pit/garage reporters
Host: Chris Schenkel; Announcer: Jim McKay; Color: Jackie Stewart	Chris Economaki; Dave Diles

== Gallery ==
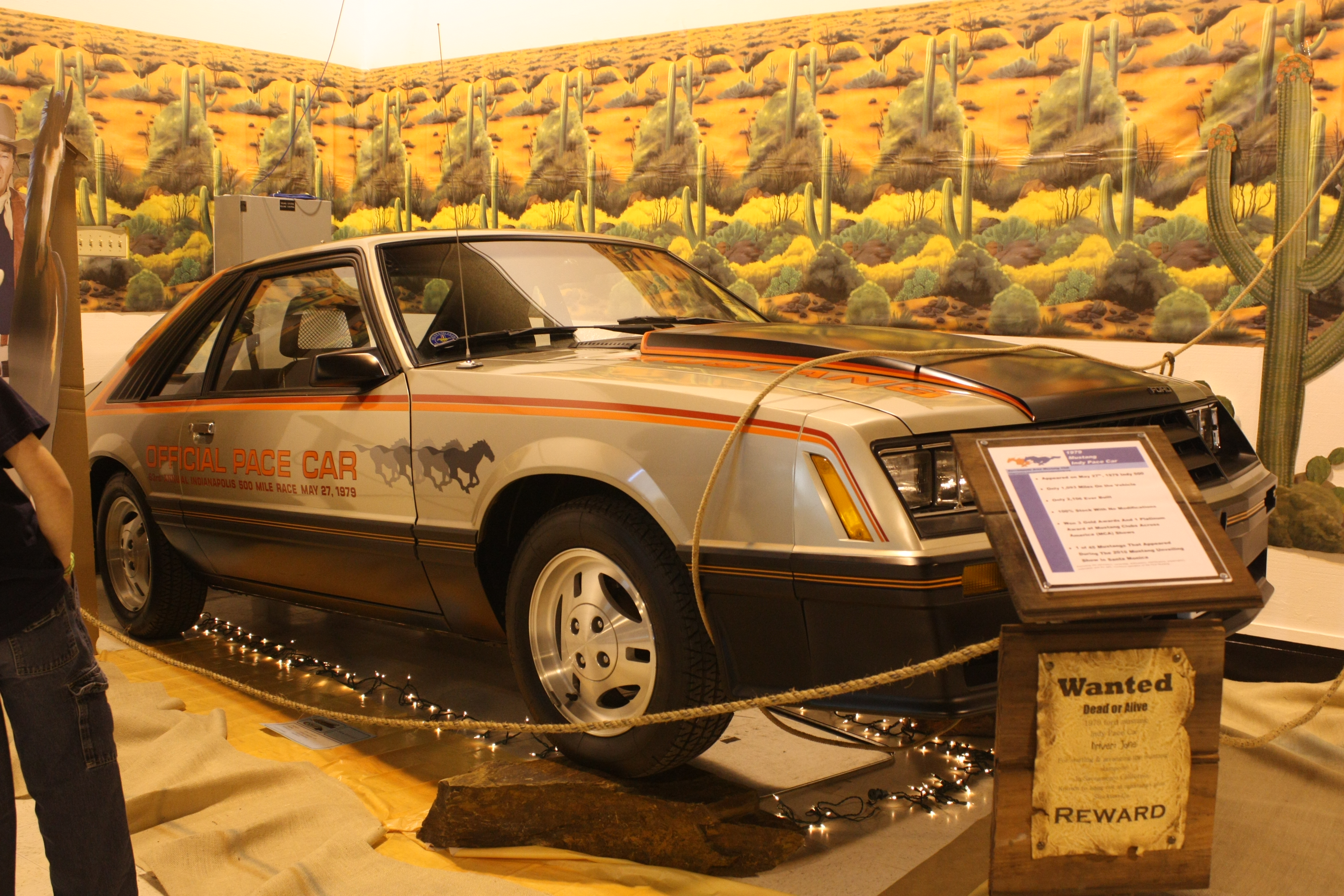
1979 Ford Mustang pace car

== Notes ==
=== See also ===
- 1979 USAC Championship Car season
- 1979 SCCA/CART Indy Car Series

=== Works cited ===
- 1979 Indianapolis 500 Official Track Report
- Indianapolis 500 History: Race & All-Time Stats – Official Site
- 1979 Indianapolis 500 Radio Broadcast, Indianapolis Motor Speedway Radio Network

Previous race: 1979 Gould Twin Dixie 125	SCCA/CART Indy Car Series; 1979 season	Next race: 1979 Trenton Twin Indy
Previous race: 1978 Indianapolis 500; Al Unser	1979 Indianapolis 500; Rick Mears	Next race: 1980 Indianapolis 500; Johnny Rutherford
