= Cliff Hucul =

Canadian racecar driver (1946–2026)

Cliff Hucul (21 August 1946 – 17 February 2026) was a Canadian racing driver who participated in USAC and the CART Championship Car series. He raced in the 1977–1981 seasons, with 24 combined career starts, including the 1977–1979 Indianapolis 500. Hucul finished in the top-ten eight times, with his best finish in fourth position in 1979 at Texas World Speedway.

== Biography ==
Hucul was born in Prince George, British Columbia on 21 August 1946. He later made two NASCAR Winston Cup starts in 1986, finishing 40th and 31st (at the 1986 running of the Delaware 500).

Hucul was rendered paraplegic in 1996 after a traffic accident on a highway in British Columbia.

Hucul died in Prince George on 17 February 2026, at the age of 79.

== Racing career results ==
=== USAC Championship Car series ===
(key) (Races in bold indicate pole position)

Year	Team	1	2	3	4	5	6	7	8	9	10	11	12	13	14	15	16	17	18	Rank	Points
1977	Hucul-Hunter-Arndt	ONT; 12	PHX; 15	TWS; 19	TRE	INDY; 22	MIL	POC	MOS	MCH	TWS	MIL	ONT	MCH	TRE	PHX; DNQ				41st	20
1978	Hucul-Hunter-Arndt	PHX; 7	ONT	TWS	TRE	INDY; 33	MOS; 10	MIL	POC; 17	MCH; DNQ	ATL	TWS; 21	MIL; 9			TRE; 13	SIL	BRH	PHX	21st	519
1978	Longhorn Racing													ONT; 8	MCH					21st	519
1979	Emil Hucul	ONT; 5	TWS; 4	INDY; 29	MIL; 7	POC; 11	TWS; 16	MIL; 19												11th	653
1980	O'Hanlon & Woodward	ONT	INDY	MIL; 7	POC	MOH														28th	90

=== CART IndyCar Series ===
(key) (Races in bold indicate pole position)

Year	Team	1	2	3	4	5	6	7	8	9	10	11	12	13	14	Rank	Points
1979	Emil Hucul	PHX	ATL	ATL	INDY; 29	TRE	TRE	MCH	MCH	WGL	TRE					NC	0
1979	Hoffman Racing											ONT; 35	MCH	ATL	PHX	NC	0
1980	O'Hanlon & Woodward	ONT	INDY	MIL; 7	POC	MOH	MCH	WGL	MIL	ONT	MCH	MEX	PHX			38th	90
1981	Metro Racing	PHX	MIL; 26	ATL	ATL	MCH; 25	RIV	MIL	MCH; 22	WGL	MEX	PHX				NC	0

=== Indianapolis 500 results ===
Year	Chassis	Engine	Start	Finish
1977	McLaren	Offy	27th	22nd
1978	McLaren	Offy	27th	33rd
1979	McLaren	Offy	18th	29th

=== NASCAR Winston Cup Series ===
NASCAR Winston Cup Series results
Year	Team/Owner	No.	Manufacturer	1	2	3	4	5	6	7	8	9	10	11	12	13	14	15	16	17	18	19	20	21	22	23	24	25	26	27	28	29	NWCC	Pts	Ref
1986	Bobby Eller	60	Pontiac	DAY	RCH	CAR	ATL	BRI	DAR	NWS	MAR	TAL	DOV	CLT	RSD	POC	MCH	DAY	POC; 40	TAL	GLN	MCH; DNQ	BRI	DAR	RCH	DOV; 40	MAR	NWS	CLT	CAR	ATL; DNQ	RSD	91st	113	

== See also ==
- List of Canadians in NASCAR
- List of Canadians in Champ Car
