= Larry Rice (racing driver) =

American racing driver

Larry Rice (24 March 1946 – 20 May 2009) was an American racing driver in the USAC and CART Championship Car series. He was also the 1973 USAC National midget driver's champion and won the USAC Silver Crown series in 1977 and 1981. He was inducted in the National Midget Auto Racing Hall of Fame in 1993.

== Racing career ==
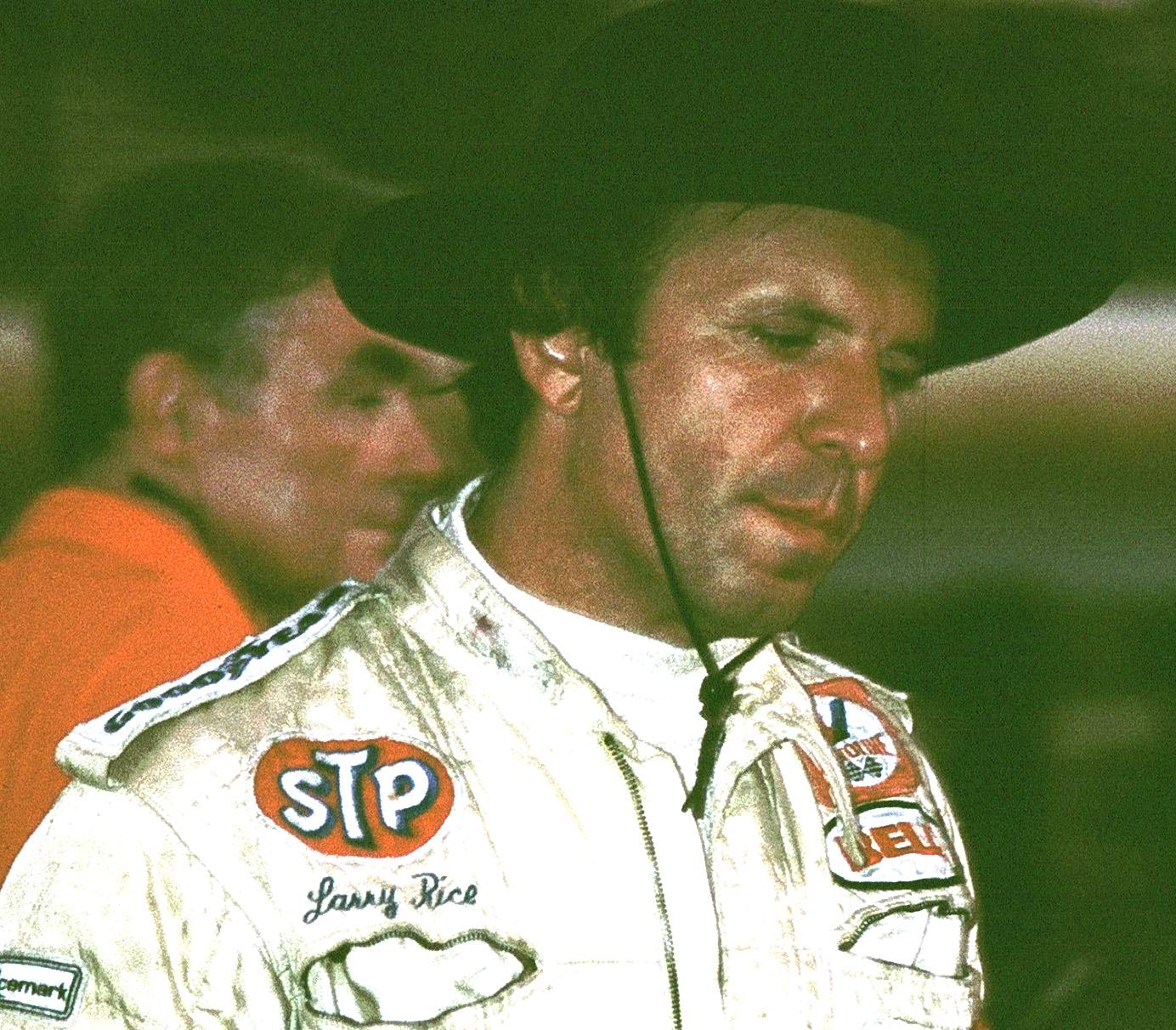
Rice in his driver's suit

Rice's father Bob got him started in racing. Bob purchased Larry's first race car, a Kurtis Craft Half Midget from Bob Cunningham in Covington, Indiana prior to turning twelve years old. Larry went to Modified Midget racing at the Logansport, Indiana track from 1965 to 1967. While in modified midget racing, Rice and his father introduced the first car with a suspension system in this type of racing. It was made by Kurtis out of Indianapolis, Indiana. Eventually all cars would have suspension systems on them.

Rice graduated from college with a teaching degree. He taught school briefly while racing the modified midget racing circuit. He was fondly known as "The Flying School Teacher" due to his ability to win races.

Rice's father Bob worked as a pit crew member for various race teams at the Indianapolis 500 in the 1970s.

=== Open wheel career ===
Rice had a major win when he won the 1970 Hut Hundred. Rice finished third in 1972 USAC National Midget championship, helping his team (Shannon Brothers) win the owner's championship. Rice followed up by winning the 1973 USAC National midget driver's championship himself. Rice was also the 1977 and 1981 USAC Silver Crown Series champion. He won the Silver Crown and sprint car portions of the 4 Crown Nationals at Eldora Speedway in 1985. He won his second Silver Crown portion at Eldora in 1987.

=== Championship car career ===
Rice competed in six seasons (1974, 1978–1979 and 1981–1983), with 15 combined career starts, including the 1978 and 1979 Indianapolis 500. He was co-named the 1978 Indianapolis 500 Rookie of the Year, along with Rick Mears, for his 11th-place finish. He had eight top-ten finishes in total, including a race win at the Indiana State Fairgrounds dirt track in 1981.

== Announcing career ==
After he stopped racing in 1991, Rice became the color analyst on ESPN's Saturday Night Thunder program. The program featured midget, sprint, and Silver Crown racing. He also worked as ESPN's regular analyst on IRL races. He was known for constantly pointing out when a driver "had to get out of the throttle" to avoid hitting another car.

== Insurance business ==
Rice later worked for K&K Insurance, specialising in motorsport insurance, and with his son Robbie (who also raced) started their own insurance organisation for motorsport, Short Track Independent Drivers and Associates (STIDA.COM).

== Death ==
Rice died from lung cancer on 20 May 2009.

== Complete USAC Championship Car results ==
Year	1	2	3	4	5	6	7	8	9	10	11	12	13	14	15	16	17	18	Pos	Points
1974	ONT	ONT	ONT	PHX	TRE; DNQ	INDY; DNQ	MIL; 24	POC	MCH	MIL	MCH	TRE	TRE	PHX					-	0
1978	PHX; DNQ	ONT	TWS	TRE; 9	INDY; 11	MOS	MIL	POC; DNQ	MCH; DNQ	ATL	TWS	MIL	ONT	MCH	TRE	SIL	BRH	PHX	32nd	180
1979	ONT	TWS	INDY; 19	MIL	POC	TWS	MIL												-	0
1981-82	INDY; DNQ	POC; 21	ILL; 2	DUQ; 13	ISF; 1	INDY; DNQ													9th	730
1982–83	ISF; 6	DSF; 6	NAZ	INDY; DNQ															11th	320
1983-84	DUQ; 8	INDY																	14th	100

== Complete PPG Indy Car Series results ==
Year	Team	1	2	3	4	5	6	7	8	9	10	11	12	13	14	Pos.	Pts	Ref
1979	S&M Electric	PHX; 10	ATL	ATL; 14	INDY; 19	TRE; 16	TRE; 10	MCH	MCH	WGL	TRE	ONT	MCH	ATL	PHX	23rd	105	
1980	Rhoades Competition	ONT	INDY	MIL	POC	MDO	MCH	WGL	MIL	ONT	MCH	MEX	PHX; DNQ			-	0	
1983		ATL	INDY; DNP	MIL	CLE	MCH	ROA	POC	RIV	MDO	MCH	CPL	LAG	PHX		-	0	

== Indianapolis 500 results ==
Year	Chassis	Engine	Start	Finish
1978	Lightning	Offenhauser	30th	11th
1979	Lightning	Offenhauser	23rd	19th

Sporting positions
Preceded by Jerry Sneva	Indianapolis 500; Rookie of the Year; 1978; With Rick Mears	Succeeded by Howdy Holmes
