= Pat Vidan =

American racing official (1914–1983)

- Born: January 27, 1914; Portland, Oregon, US
- Died: April 1, 1983 (aged 69); Portland, Oregon, US
- Occupation: Flagman/starter
- Years active: 1947–1979
- Awards: Inducted into the Indianapolis Motor Speedway Hall of Fame (2011)

Patrick "Pat" Vidan (January 27, 1914 – April 1, 1983) was an American stuntman, racing official, and starter of the Indianapolis 500 from 1962 to 1979.

== Career ==
Vidan flagged the first race at the Hollywood Bowl speedway in Salem, Oregon, in 1947. During his tenure at the Hollywood Bowl, Vidan often entertained the crowd with motorcycle stunts and chalk painting between races. In September 1951, a race named in his honor was held.

In 1957, Vidan travelled to Florida to flag midget car races. Tony Hulman, president of the Indianapolis Motor Speedway, saw Vidan's performance and invited Vidan to be the assistant starter of the Indianapolis 500. From 1958 to 1961, Vidan worked as an assistant to chief starter Bill Vandewater. Vidan took over as the chief starter in 1962.

Vidan and the Indianapolis Motor Speedway were criticized for the start of the 1973 Indianapolis 500 with critics saying that if Vidan was in a flagstand outside the track that the lap 1 crash involving Salt Walther could have been avoided, however Vidan believed that the start was "all right".

Due to the ongoing "split", Vidan became upset with the politics and retired from flagging in 1979.

== Flagging style ==
Vidan was described to have a "freelance" flagging style, often waving flags from his right hand, behind his back, and to his left hand. Vidan often wore a white suit or jacket and black pants while flagging, claiming that drivers could see him more clearly.

Vidan preferred to flag from inside the track, saying that "if I were on the outside, [the drivers] would have to look left to their pitmen, then right toward me. That's a lot of looking around at 200 miles per hour."

After each race flagged, Vidan would get the checkered flag signed by every starter of that years Indianapolis 500.

== Personal life ==
Vidan owned a fitness studio with his wife Marilyn in Speedway, Indiana, from 1966 to 1978.

Vidan died on April 1, 1983, after suffering a short undisclosed illness.

Preceded by Bill Vandewater	Starter of the Indianapolis 500; 1962–1979	Succeeded by Duane Sweeney
