= Lola T500 =

Open-wheel racing car chassis

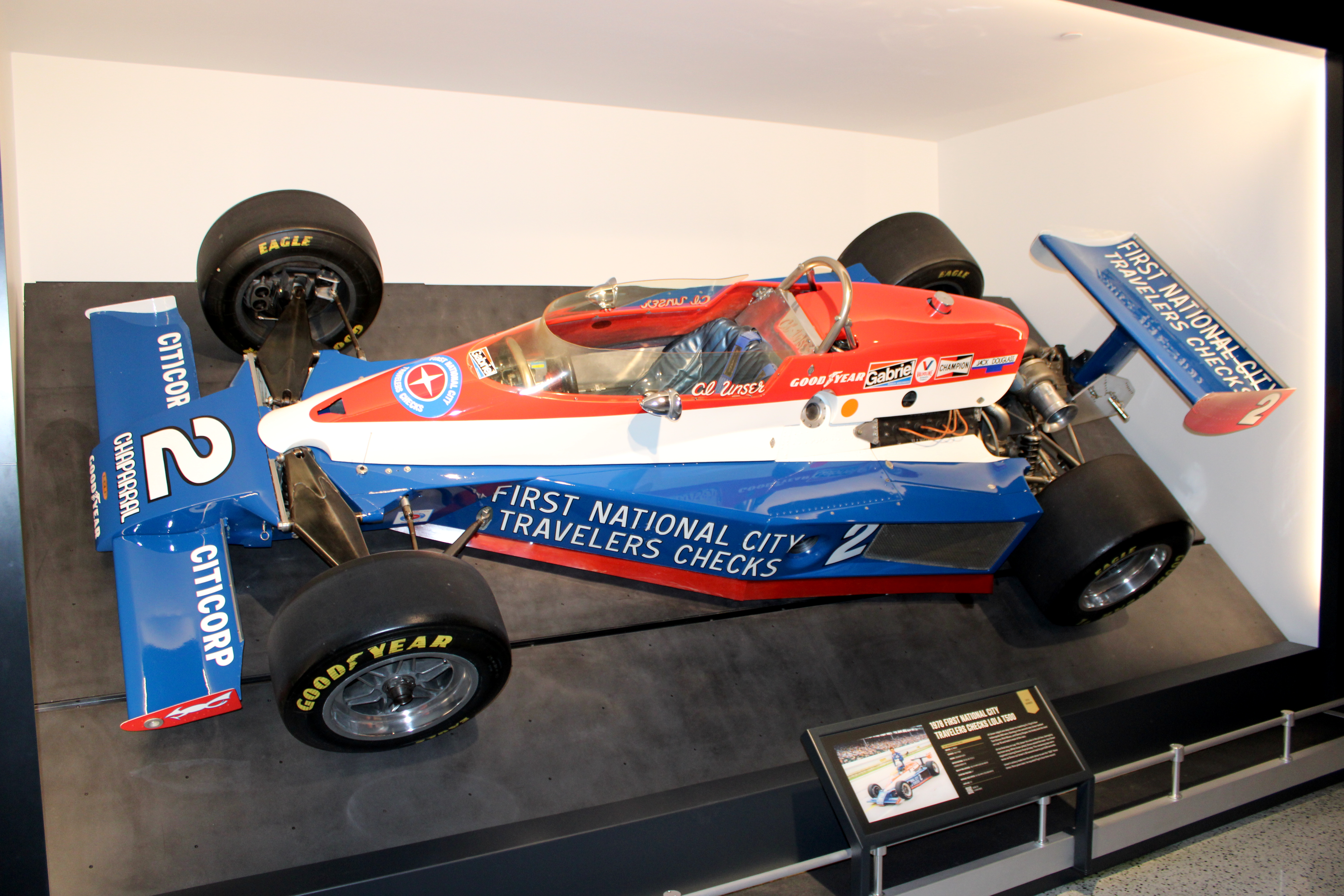
- Category: USAC IndyCar
- Constructor: Lola
- Predecessor: Lola T270
- Successor: Lola T700

Technical specifications
- Chassis: Aluminum monocoque with fully-stressed engine
- Suspension (front): Lower wishbones, top rockers actuating in-board coil springs over dampers, anti-roll bar
- Suspension (rear): Twin lower links, single top links, twin trailing arms, coil springs over dampers, anti-roll bar
- Axle track: 62.75 in (159.4 cm) (front); 62 in (157.5 cm) (rear)
- Wheelbase: 110 in (279.4 cm)
- Engine: Cosworth DFX 2,650 cc (161.7 cu in) V8 80° Mid-engined, longitudinally mounted
- Transmission: Hewland L.G.500 4 speed manual
- Weight: 1,598 lb (724.8 kg)
- Fuel: Methanol, supplied by Mobil
- Tyres: Goodyear Eagle Speedway Specials - Rear 27.0x14.0-15 - Front 25.5x10.0-15

Competition history

The Lola T500 is an open-wheel racing car chassis, designed, developed and built by Lola Cars, that competed in the CART open-wheel racing series, for competition in the 1978, 1979, and 1980 USAC Championship Car seasons. It was powered by the 840 hp (630 kW) Ford-Cosworth DFX. Only 5 models were produced. It won a total of 3 races, all in 1978, including the famous and prestigious 1978 Indianapolis 500, being driven by Al Unser.
