= Tom Bigelow =

American racing driver (born 1939)

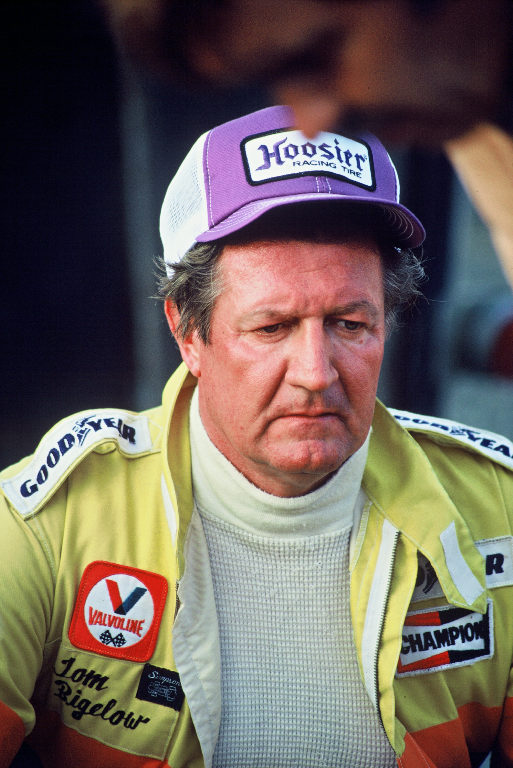
- Born: Thomas Allan Bigelow; October 31, 1939 (age 87) Elkhorn, Wisconsin, U.S.

Champ Car career
- 110 races run over 18 years
- Years active: 1968–1985
- Best finish: 3rd – 1979 (USAC), 1981–82 (USAC)
- First race: 1968 Ted Horn Memorial (DuQuoin)
- Last race: 1985 Domino's Pizza 500 (Pocono)
Wins	Podiums	Poles
0	5	2

NASCAR Cup Series career
- 1 race run over 1 year
- Best finish: 121st (1986)
- First race: 1986 Atlanta Journal 500 (Atlanta)
Wins	Top tens	Poles
0	0	0

Thomas Allan Bigelow (born October 31, 1939, in Elkhorn, Wisconsin) is an American former driver in the USAC and CART Championship Car series.

== Racing career ==
=== Midget car racing ===
Bigelow began his racing career at the Badger Midget Racing Association at Angell Park Speedway in Sun Prairie, Wisconsin. His first attempt at the National Championship was in 1967, and he finished eighteenth. He had 1968 midget wins at Hales Corners Speedway in Hales Corners, Wisconsin, and at the Sycamore, Illinois, track. He won the first Astro Grand Prix in the Houston Astrodome in 1969. His come back in Midgets started in 1981 driving for Sandy Racing.

In 1984, Bigelow was National USAC Midget Champion. For two years in a row (1982 and 1983), he was USAC Spreedrome champion.

=== USAC/CART ===
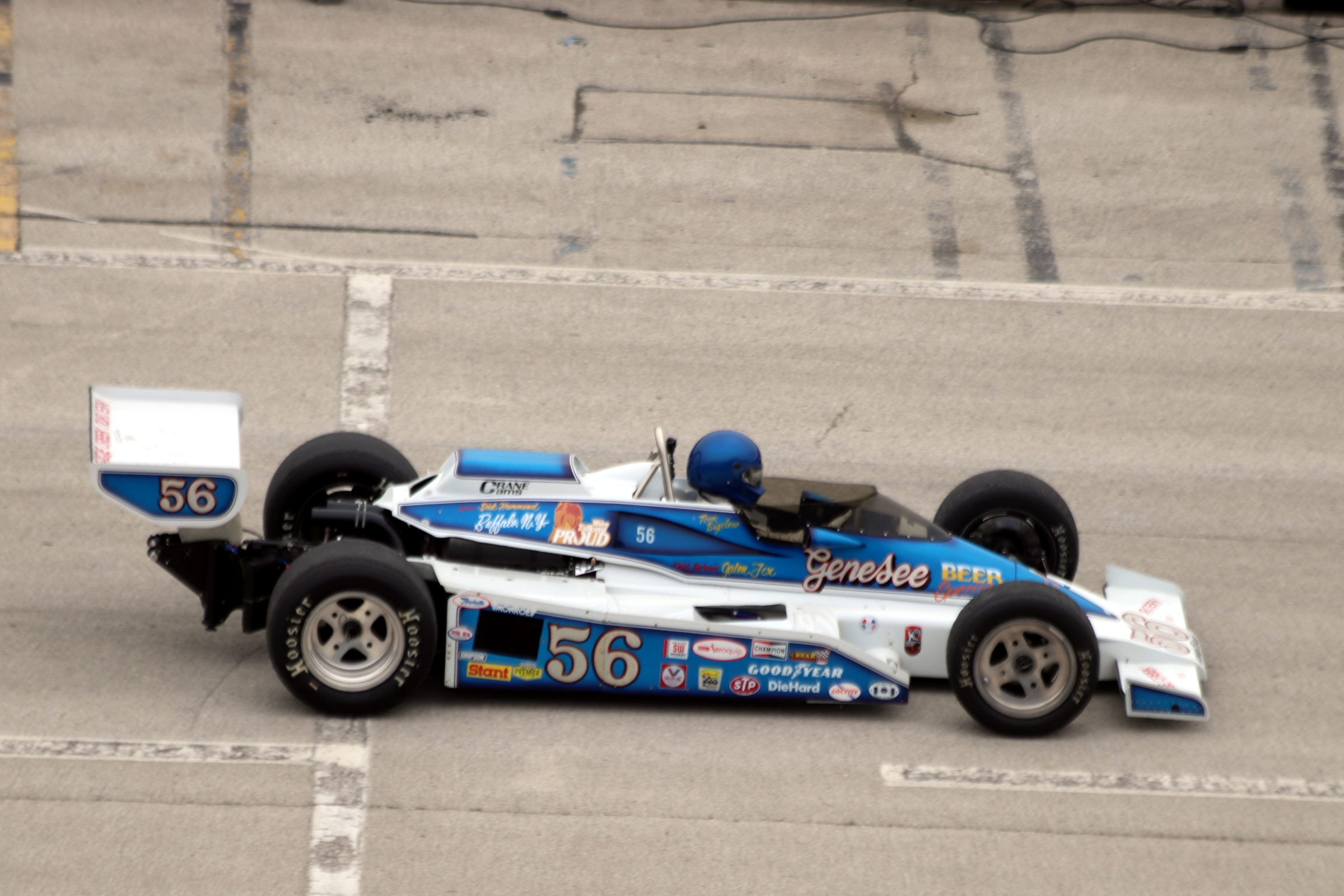
Bigelow's 1981 Indycar (or replica) in a vintage car race

Bigelow raced in USAC and CART in 17 seasons (1968–1983 and 1985), with 104 combined career starts, and started in the Indianapolis 500 every year during 1974 to 1982. He finished in the top-ten 39 times, with his best finish in second position in 1978 at Texas World Speedway and Milwaukee.

Bigelow started in nine straight Indianapolis 500 races between 1974 and 1982, his best finish was sixth in 1977.

=== Sprint car ===
Bigelow was the 1978 USAC Sprint Car Series Champion. He became the leader in USAC Sprint car single season wins with fourteen. Bigelow won 52 USAC Sprint Car races in his career.

=== Return to midget cars ===
Bigelow returned to his roots won the 1984 USAC National Midget Series Champion. He finished fourth, third, and ninth in the following three season. He also won the 1982 USAC Midwest Regional midget car title. His car (number 16) was owned by Carl Sandy, husband of Carol Sandy and father of Duane, Mathew, and Troy Sandy.

=== NASCAR ===
Bigelow made a single NASCAR start at the 1986 Atlanta Journal 500 at the Atlanta International Raceway, and he finished fourtieth with engine problems.

== Career awards ==
- Bigelow was a 2002 inductee in the National Midget Auto Racing Hall of Fame at his home track in Sun Prairie.
- Bigelow was inducted in the National Sprint Car Hall of Fame in 1996.

== Retirement ==
Starting in 2009, Bigelow was a color announcer for Fox Sports Network for Must See Racing Xtreme Sprint Series television coverage.

== Motorsports career results ==
=== American open-wheel racing ===
(key) (Races in bold indicate pole position)

==== USAC Championship Car ====
USAC Championship Car results
Year	Team	Chassis	Engine	1	2	3	4	5	6	7	8	9	10	11	12	13	14	15	16	17	18	19	20	21	22	23	24	25	26	27	28	Pos.	Pts
1968	Carl Gehlhausen	Kurtis 4000D	Offy 252 ci	HAN	LVS	PHX	TRE	INDY	MIL	MOS	MOS	LAN	PPR	CDR	NAZ	IRP	IRP	LAN	LAN	MTR	MTR	ISF	MIL	DSF; 6	INF; DNQ	TRE	SAC; 14	MCH	HAN	PHX	RSD	43rd	80
1969	Carl Gehlhausen	Huffaker 66	Chevrolet 320 ci V8	PHX	HAN	INDY	MIL	LAN; DNQ	PPR	CDR		TRE; 18	IRP; 21	IRP; 17	MIL		DOV; DNQ					TRE; DNS	SAC	SIR	SIR	PHX	RSD					43rd	110
1969	Carl Gehlhausen	Kurtis 4000D	Offy 252 ci								NAZ; 7					ISF; DNQ		DSF; 8	INF; DNQ	BRN	BRN											43rd	110
1970	Carl Gehlhausen	Huffaker 66	Chevrolet 320 ci V8	PHX	SON	TRE	INDY; DNQ	MIL; DNQ	LAN; 17	CDR	MCH	IRP; DNQ		MIL; 13	ONT				TRE; 17		PHX; DNQ											36th	200
1970	Carl Gehlhausen	Kurtis 4000D	Offy 252 ci										ISF; 7			DSF; 7	INF; DNQ	SED; 6		SAC; 17												36th	200
1971	Carl Gehlhausen	Huffaker 66	Chevrolet 320 ci V8	RAF; 21	RAF; 22	PHX	TRE	INDY	MIL	POC	MCH	MIL	ONT	TRE	PHX																	NC	0
1972	Ray W Smith	Eagle 68	Chevrolet 320 ci V8	PHX	TRE	INDY; DNQ	MIL																									31st	120
1972	Carl Gehlhausen	Gerhardt	Offy 159 ci t					MCH; 21	POC; DNS	MIL; 7	ONT	TRE; 13	PHX																			31st	120
1973	Vollstedt Enterprises	Vollstedt 72	Offy 159 ci t	TWS	TRE	TRE	INDY; DNQ		POC; 32			ONT; 7	ONT	ONT; 11	MCH	MCH	TRE	TWS	PHX													25th	160
1973	Carl Gehlhausen	Kingfish 72	Offy 159 ci t					MIL; 14																								25th	160
1973	Vollstedt Enterprises	Vollstedt 73	Offy 159 ci t							MCH; 15	MIL																					25th	160
1974	Vollstedt Enterprises	Vollstedt 72	Offy 159 ci t	ONT; 9	ONT	ONT; 10	PHX	TRE																								24th	240
1974	Vollstedt Enterprises	Vollstedt 73	Offy 159 ci t						INDY; 12	MIL	POC; 19	MCH; 22	MIL	MCH	TRE	TRE																24th	240
1974	Lodestar Lola	Lola T332	Chevrolet 5.0 V8														PHX; 23															24th	240
1975	Vollstedt Enterprises	Vollstedt 73	Offy 159 ci t	ONT	ONT; 11	ONT; 16	PHX	TRE	INDY; 18	MIL; 12	POC; 21	MCH; 16																				27th	115
1975	Vollstedt Enterprises	Vollstedt 72/75	Offy 159 ci t										MIL; 9	MCH	TRE	PHX; 19																27th	115
1976	Leader Card Racers	Eagle 74	Offy 159 ci t	PHX; 20	TRE; 17		MIL; 11	POC; 29	MCH; 12	TWS; 7	TRE; 21	MIL; 7	ONT; 5	MCH; 9	TWS; 14	PHX; 18																13th	820
1976	Leader Card Racers	Eagle 72	Offy 159 ci t			INDY; 14																										13th	820
1977	Leader Card Racers	Eagle 74	Offy 159 ci t	ONT; 4	PHX; 4	TWS; 12	TRE; 15				MOS; 8			MIL; 4			PHX; 19															9th	1370
1977	Leader Card Racers	Watson 77	Offy 159 ci t					INDY; 6	MIL; 7	POC; 29		MCH; 11	TWS; 10		ONT; 28	MCH; 15																9th	1370
1978	AMI Racing	Wildcat Mk 2	DGS 158 ci t	PHX; 15	ONT; 7	TWS; 12	TRE; 8	INDY; 21			POC; 15	MCH; 8	ATL	TWS	MIL; 10	ONT	MCH; 4	TRE	SIL	BRH	PHX; 18											16th	764
1978	Leader Card Racers	Eagle 74	Offy 159 ci t						MOS; 14																							16th	764
1978	Leader Card Racers	Watson 77	Offy 159 ci t							MIL; 6																						16th	764
1979	AMI Racing	Lola T500B	Cosworth DFX V8t	ONT; 6	TWS; 12	INDY; 14	MIL; 3	POC; 8	TWS; 2	**MIL**; 2																						3rd	1305
1980	AMI Racing	Lola T500B	Cosworth DFX V8t	ONT	INDY; 8	MIL	POC	MOH																								12th	250
1981-82	Gohr Racing	Penske PC-7	Chevrolet 355 ci V8	INDY; 20	POC; 3																											3rd	1280
1981-82	Info not available					**ISF**; 12	DSF; 2	INF; 5																								3rd	1280
1981-82	HBK Racing	Eagle 81	Chevrolet 355 ci V8						INDY; 18																							3rd	1280
1982-83	Info not available			ISF	DSF; 25	NAZ																										NC	0
1982-83	HBK Racing	Eagle 81	Chevrolet 355 ci V8				INDY; DNQ																									NC	0
1983-84	Info not available			DSF; 17																												33rd	8
1983-84	Scott Cole	March 81C	Cosworth DFX V8t		INDY; DNQ																											33rd	8

==== PPG Indy Car World Series ====
PPG Indy Car World Series results
Year	Team	Chassis	Engine	1	2	3	4	5	6	7	8	9	10	11	12	13	14	15	16	Pos.	Pts	Ref
1979	AMI Racing	Lola T500B	Cosworth DFX V8t	PHX	ATL	ATL	INDY; 14	TRE	TRE	MCH	MCH	WGL	TRE	ONT	MCH	ATL	PHX			NC	0	
1980	AMI Racing	Lola T500B	Cosworth DFX V8t	ONT	INDY; 8	MIL	POC	MOH	MCH	WGL	MIL; 14	ONT	MCH	MEX	PHX					26th	260	
1981	Gohr Racing	Penske PC-7	Chevrolet 355 ci V8	PHX	MIL; 9	ATL	ATL	MCH; 5	RIV	MIL; 24	MCH; 9	WGL	MEX	PHX; 11						12th	60	
1982	HBK Racing	Eagle 81	Chevrolet 355 ci V8	PHX	ATL	MIL; 18	CLE; DNQ	MCH; 5	MIL; 22	POC; 25	RIV	ROA	MCH; 20	PHX						20th	32	
1983	HBK Racing	Eagle 81	Chevrolet 355 ci V8	ATL	INDY; DNQ	MIL; 15	CLE; DNQ	MCH; 29	ROA	POC	RIV	MOH	MCH							NC	0	
1983	Jet Engineering	Eagle 82	Chevrolet 355 ci V8											CPL; DNQ	LAG; 17	PHX; DNQ				NC	0	
1984	Scott Cole	March 81C	Cosworth DFX V8t	LBH	PHX	INDY; DNQ														NA	-	
1984	Dale Coyne Racing	Eagle 82	Chevrolet 355 ci V8				MIL; DNQ	POR	MEA	CLE	MCH	ROA	POC	MOH	SAN	MCH	PHX	LAG	CPL	NA	-	
1985	Leader Card Racers	March 85C	Cosworth DFX V8t	LBH	INDY; DNQ	MIL; 18	POR	MEA	CLE	MCH; 26	ROA	POC; 23	MOH	SAN	MCH	LAG	PHX	MIA		47th	0	
1988	Dayton-Walther	March 86C	Cosworth DFX V8t	PHX	LBH	INDY; DNQ	MIL	POR	CLE	TOR	MEA	MCH	POC	MOH	ROA	NAZ	LAG	MIA		NA	-	
1989	Burns Racing	March 86C	Cosworth DFX V8t	PHX	LBH	INDY; DNQ	MIL	DET	POR	CLE	MEA	TOR	MCH	POC	MOH	ROA	NAZ	LAG		NA	-	

===== Indianapolis 500 =====
Year	Chassis	Engine	Start	Finish	Team
1970	Huffaker	Chevrolet	DNQ		Carl Gehlhausen
1972	Eagle	Chevrolet	DNQ		Ray W Smith
1973	Vollstedt	Offenhauser	DNQ		Vollstedt Enterprises
1974	Vollstedt	Offenhauser	23	12	Vollstedt Enterprises
1975	Vollstedt	Offenhauser	33	18	Vollstedt Enterprises
1976	Eagle	Offenhauser	32	14	Leader Card Racers
1977	Eagle	Offenhauser	22	6	Thermo King
1978	Wildcat	DGS	18	21	AMI Racing
1979	Lola	Cosworth	30	14	AMI Racing
1980	Lola	Cosworth	31	8	AMI Racing
1981	Penske	Chevrolet	14	20	Gohr Racing
1982	Eagle	Chevrolet	31	18	HBK Racing
1983	Eagle	Chevrolet	DNQ		HBK Racing
1984	March	Cosworth	DNQ		Scott Cole
1985	March	Cosworth	DNQ		Leader Card Racers
1988	March	Cosworth	DNQ		Dayton-Walther
1989	March	Cosworth	DNQ		Burns Racing

=== NASCAR ===
(key) (Bold – Pole position awarded by qualifying time. Italics – Pole position earned by points standings or practice time. * – Most laps led.)

==== Winston Cup Series ====
NASCAR Winston Cup Series results
Year	Team	No.	Make	1	2	3	4	5	6	7	8	9	10	11	12	13	14	15	16	17	18	19	20	21	22	23	24	25	26	27	28	29	NWCC	Pts	Ref
1986	Ball Motorsports	99	Chevy	DAY	RCH	CAR	ATL	BRI	DAR	NWS	MAR	TAL	DOV	CLT	RSD	POC	MCH	DAY	POC	TAL	GLN	MCH	BRI	DAR	RCH	DOV	MAR	NWS	CLT	CAR	ATL; 40	RSD	121st	43	

=== ARCA Bondo/Mar-Hyde Series ===
(key) (Bold – Pole position awarded by qualifying time. Italics – Pole position earned by points standings or practice time. * – Most laps led.)

ARCA Bondo/Mar-Hyde Series results
Year	Team	No.	Make	1	2	3	4	5	6	7	8	9	10	11	12	13	14	15	16	17	18	19	20	21	22	23	24	25	ABSC	Pts	Ref
1985	Info not available			ATL	DAY	ATL	TAL	ATL	SSP	IRP	CSP	FRS	IRP	OEF	ISF	DSF; 22	TOL												74th	-	
1986	Bigelow Racing	96	Dodge	ATL	DAY	ATL	TAL; 37	SIR	SSP	FRS	KIL	CSP	TAL	BLN	ISF	DSF	TOL	MCS	ATL										NA	0	
1987	Bigelow Racing	60	Pontiac	DAY	ATL	TAL	DEL	ACS	TOL	ROC	POC	FRS	KIL	TAL	FRS	ISF; 32	INF; 15	DSF; 15	SLM	ATL									46th	-	
1988	Bigelow Racing	60	Pontiac	DAY	ATL	TAL; 38	FRS	PCS	ROC	POC	WIN	KIL	ACS	SLM; 26	POC	TAL	DEL	FRS	ISF; 22	DSF; 40	SLM; 4	ATL							32nd	-	
1989	Bigelow Racing	60	Pontiac	DAY; DNQ									TAL; DNQ	DEL	FRS	ISF; 29	TOL	DSF; 28	SLM; 25	ATL									34th	-	
1989	Bigelow Racing	60	Chevy		ATL; 17	KIL	TAL	FRS	POC	KIL	HAG	POC																	34th	-	
1990	Bigelow Racing	60	Pontiac	DAY	ATL	KIL	TAL	FRS	POC	KIL	TOL	HAG; 10	POC; 13	TAL	MCH; 27	ISF; 27	TOL	DSF; 30	WIN; 26	DEL	ATL; 34								24th	-	
1991	Bigelow Racing	60	Pontiac	DAY	ATL	KIL	TAL	TOL	FRS	POC	MCH	KIL	FRS	DEL	POC	TAL	HPT	MCH	ISF	TOL	DSF; 23	TWS	ATL						103rd	-	
1992	Bigelow Racing	60	Pontiac	DAY	FIF	TWS	TAL	TOL	KIL	POC	MCH	FRS	KIL	NSH	DEL	POC	HPT	FRS	ISF; 27	TOL	DSF; 12	TWS	SLM; 17	ATL					60th	-	
1993	Bigelow Racing	60	Pontiac	DAY	FIF	TWS	TAL	KIL	CMS	FRS	TOL	POC	MCH	FRS	POC	KIL	ISF; 36	DSF; 21	TOL	SLM; 25	WIN; 20	ATL							40th	-	
1994	Bigelow Racing	8	Pontiac	DAY	TAL	FIF	LVL	KIL	TOL	FRS	MCH	DMS	POC	POC	KIL	FRS	INF; 20	I70	ISF				WIN; 21	ATL					44th	350	
1994		01	Chevy																	DSF; 27	TOL	SLM							44th	350	
1995	Bigelow Racing	8	Pontiac	DAY	ATL	TAL	FIF	KIL	FRS	MCH	I80	MCS	FRS	POC	POC	KIL	FRS	SBS	LVL	ISF; 23		SLM; 23							55th	565	
1995	Bigelow Racing	8	Chevy																		DSF; 6		WIN; 19	ATL					55th	565	
1996	Bigelow Racing	8	Pontiac	DAY	ATL	SLM	TAL	FIF	LVL	CLT	CLT	KIL	FRS	POC	MCH	FRS	TOL	POC	MCH	INF; 7	SBS	ISF; 18	DSF; 11	KIL	SLM	WIN; 23	CLT	ATL	54th	-	
1997	Bigelow Racing	8	Chevy	DAY; DNQ	ATL	SLM	CLT	CLT	POC	MCH; 33	SBS	TOL	KIL	FRS	MIN	POC	MCH												95th	-	
1997	Bigelow Racing	8	Pontiac															DSF; 15	GTW	SLM	WIN	CLT	TAL	ISF	ATL				95th	-	
1998	Bigelow Racing	8	Chevy	DAY; DNQ	ATL	SLM	CLT	MEM	MCH	POC	SBS	TOL	PPR	POC	KIL	FRS	ISF	ATL	DSF	SLM	TEX	WIN	CLT	TAL	ATL				NA	-	
