= 1973 Indianapolis 500 =

American motor race

57th Indianapolis 500
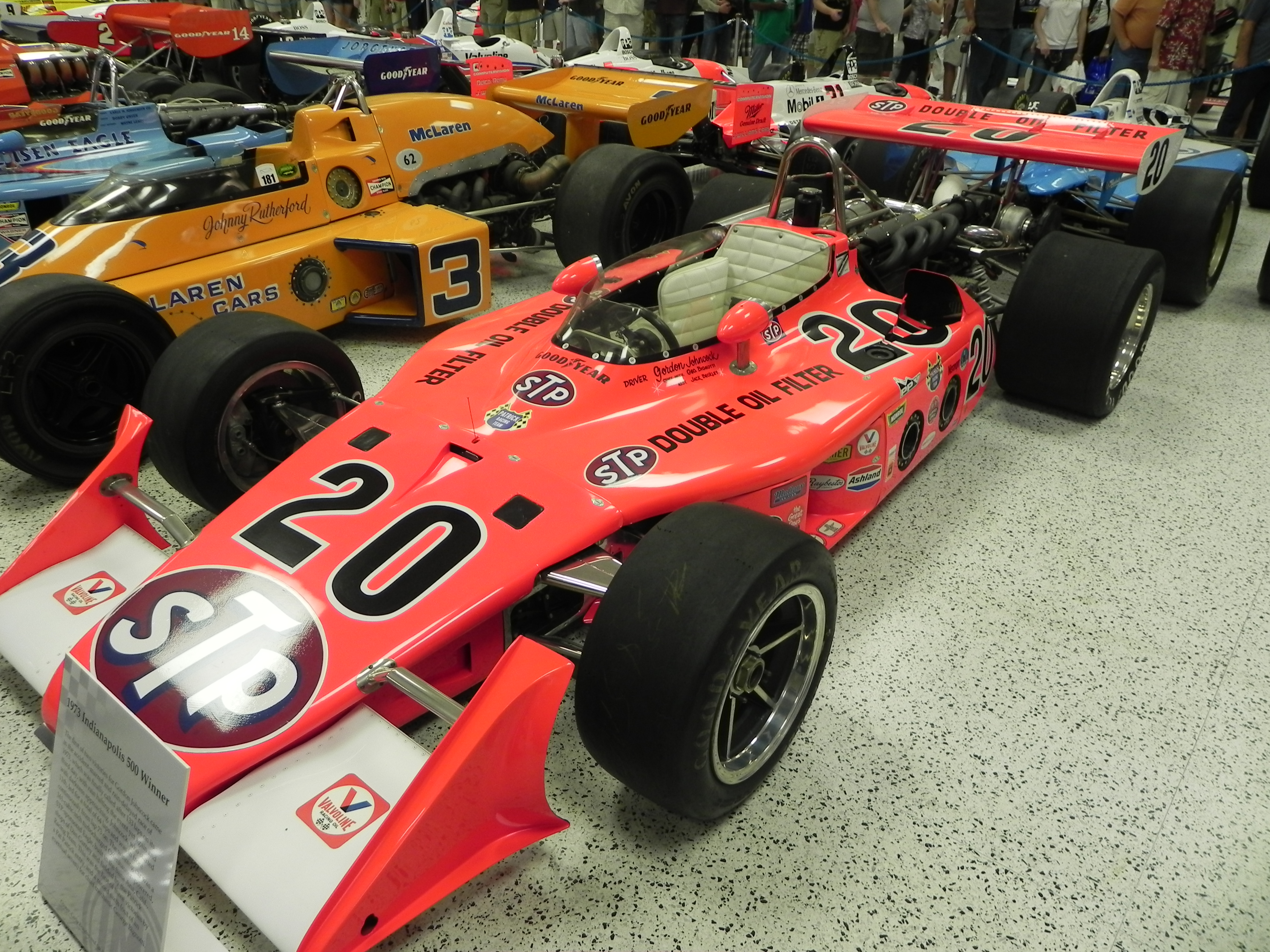

Indianapolis Motor Speedway

Indianapolis 500
- Sanctioning body: USAC
- Season: 1973 USAC Trail
- Date: May 28–30, 1973
- Winner: Gordon Johncock
- Winning team: Patrick Racing
- Winning Chief Mechanic: George Bignotti
- Time of race: 2:05:26.59
- Average speed: 159.036 mph (255.944 km/h)
- Pole position: Johnny Rutherford
- Pole speed: 198.413 mph (319.315 km/h)
- Fastest qualifier: Johnny Rutherford
- Rookie of the Year: Graham McRae
- Most laps led: Gordon Johncock (64)

Pre-race ceremonies
- National anthem: Purdue Band
- "Back Home Again in Indiana": Jim Nabors
- Starting command: Tony Hulman
- Pace car: Cadillac Eldorado
- Pace car driver: Jim Rathmann
- Starter: Pat Vidan
- Estimated attendance: 300,000 (Mon.); 200,000 (Tue.); 125,000 (Wed.)

Television in the United States
- Network: ABC
- Announcers: Jim McKay, Jackie Stewart, Chris Economaki
- Nielsen ratings: 16.5 / 30

Chronology
Previous	Next
1972	1974

The 57th 500 Mile International Sweepstakes was held at the Indianapolis Motor Speedway in Speedway, Indiana, on Wednesday, May 30, 1973. The race was held over three days because of rain and two major accidents. Three competitors—two drivers and one pit crew member—died from injuries suffered as a result of accidents that occurred during the month. Another driver was critically injured, and over a dozen spectators suffered injuries and/or burns. After 133 of 200 laps were completed (332 1/2 mi (535.1 km)), rain halted the race, and Gordon Johncock was declared the winner, the first of his two Indy triumphs (1973, 1982).

Going into the month, the mood was bright and excitement was high for record speeds. Competitors, media, and fans were eagerly anticipating the possibility of breaking the elusive and daunting 200 mph (321.9 km/h) barrier during time trials. The month took a tragic turn, however, when driver Art Pollard died in a crash during a practice session on the morning of May 12. Later that same day, Johnny Rutherford set a new track record during time trials. His best lap of 199.071 mph (320.4 km/h) fell just short of breaking the highly sought-after speed barrier. Despite Rutherford's headlines on pole day, the mood meanwhile around the garage area was becoming anxious and uncertain. Fears were growing about rising speeds and safety. Inclement weather was also interfering with the scheduled on-track activity.

The race was scheduled for Monday May 28, but was aborted by a red flag because of a major accident collecting multiple cars at the start. Driver David "Salt" Walther was critically injured and numerous spectators in the track boxes and first few rows of the Paddock grandstands suffered burns from a fireball resulting from the accident. Multiple spectators required hospitalization, and some were left in critical condition; with the blast of heat felt as much as 100 yards away. Two vertical stanchions of the outside catchfence were broken, and a lengthy segment of the fence needed to be repaired before any racing could resume. Before the repairs could be completed, rain began to fall, and washed out the rest of the day. Rain also washed out any chance to hold the race on Tuesday May 29. Only a fraction of the typical Indy crowd arrived to watch the race by the time it was run on Wednesday May 30; and in fact since schools were closed in Speedway and within a few miles around west Indianapolis due to traffic, many hundreds of schoolkids and parents were bused in to fill the grandstands for free.

The race on Wednesday suffered two separate fatal accidents. On lap 59, driver David "Swede" Savage suffered a violent and fiery crash coming out of turn four. Savage died from complications of his injuries on July 2. The second fatality involved Armando Teran, a pit crew member for Graham McRae (a teammate to Savage). In the aftermath of Savage's crash, Teran stepped out into the pit lane and was struck by a safety truck going in the opposite direction. Owing to the tragic circumstances, relentless weather problems, rain-shortened finish, and overall glum mood during the month, the 1973 race is widely considered the worst year for the running of the Indianapolis 500. In contemporary accounts, the race had been called "jinxed" by Dan Gurney, Chris Economaki, and Jim McKay. Statistically, it was the track's deadliest month of May since 1937.

National media opinions, as well as those from team owners and crew, were highly critical in the aftermath of the race, focusing mainly on inadequate safety measures. The circumstances led to sweeping rule changes by USAC, some made effective for the Schaefer 500 at Pocono Raceway four weeks later. Numerous safety improvements were made to the Indianapolis Motor Speedway track itself that were completed for 1974.

Off the track, the Speedway had completed construction of its first VIP Suites outside of turn two. Following in the footsteps of Ontario Motor Speedway, Indianapolis became the second major racing facility to feature luxury boxes.

== Race schedule ==
In 1971, the Uniform Monday Holiday Act took effect, moving Memorial Day from the fixed date of May 30 to the final Monday in May. For 1971 and 1972, the race was held on the Saturday of Memorial Day weekend. The Speedway still maintained a policy of not holding the race on a Sunday, and for 1973, the race was scheduled for the Monday Memorial Day holiday itself (May 28). The change was made after requests from spectators, many complaining that it was inconvenient to the many people who had to work on Saturdays.

The 500 Festival Committee had a desire to move their annual parade downtown to either Saturday or Sunday afternoon. Since its inception in 1957, in most years the parade was held at night during the week. For 1973, the parade was held Sunday afternoon, shortly after the public driver's meeting, and the race was scheduled for Monday. This schedule would stay in place for only one year. A decision was made that starting in 1974, the race would permanently move to Sunday.

Race schedule — April/May 1973
Sun	Mon	Tue	Wed	Thu	Fri	Sat
22	23	24	25	26	27	28; Practice
29; Practice	30; Practice	1 Practice	2 Practice	3 Practice	4 Practice	5 Practice
6 Practice	7 Practice	8 Practice	9 Practice	10; Practice	11; Practice	12; Pole Day
13; Time Trials	14; Practice	15; Practice	16; Practice	17; Practice	18; Practice	19; Time Trials
20; Bump Day	21	22	23	24; Carb Day	25	26
27; Meeting; Parade	28; Indy 500; 11:00 a.m.	29; Indy 500; 9:00 a.m.	30; Indy 500; 9:00 a.m.	31		

Color	Notes
Green	Practice
Dark Blue	Time trials
Silver	Race day
Red	Rained out*
Blank	No track activity

* Includes days where track
activity was significantly
limited due to rain

== Practice and time trials ==
=== Practice ===
Just one year prior, USAC began allowing bolt-on wings. The increased downforce increased lap speeds nearly 30 mph (48 km/h) in just three years. The dramatic rise went from 170 mph (274 km/h) in 1970, to flirting with the 200 mph (320 km/h) barrier for 1973. During Goodyear tire tests in late March, Gordon Johncock set an unofficial track record of 199.4 mph (320.9 km/h). Experts and officials agree that the safety features in the cars were not prepared for the speeds attained. In addition, engine development with the turbocharged version of the venerable I-4 Offenhauser had resulted in horsepower readings in high-boost qualifying trim in excess of 1,100 hp (820 kW). According to Mario Andretti, this was sufficient to induce rear wheelspin on the 1/8 mi (200 m) "short chutes" between turns 1 and 2 and turns 3 and 4—an unnerving sensation for even the bravest, most skilled and experienced of drivers.

The track opened on Saturday April 28 with Gary Bettenhausen earning the honor of first driver on the track. Rain and winds plagued practice during the first week, while drivers started creeping up the speed chart. On Monday April 30, chief steward Harlan Fengler lifted the 180 mph (290 km/h) speed limit and speeds climbed quickly. Gordon Johncock set an unofficial lap of over 190 mph (310 km/h) to set the early pace. Johnny Rutherford was another member of the "190 mph club" with several laps in the mid-190 mph range. On May 5, Swede Savage upped the speed chart to 197.802 mph (318.331 km/h), inching closer to the elusive 200 mph (320 km/h) mark.

On Sunday May 6, three drivers left the grounds to race in the NASCAR Winston 500 at Talladega. A huge crash, described as the worst crash in the history of NASCAR, put Bobby Allison and Gordon Johncock out of that race. Dick Simon, however, escaped the incident, with Simon coming home 7th. All three returned to qualify at Indy.

Rain and high winds kept speeds down in the second week of practice. Mario Andretti turned a lap of 192.967 mph (310.550 km/h) on Thursday May 10. The final day of practice before pole day was Friday May 11. From April 28 – May 11, there were only three accidents reported in practice that involved wall contact, none of which caused serious injuries.

By the eve of pole day, no drivers had eclipsed the 200 mph (320 km/h) barrier according to published reports, but conditions were favorable for pole day, and anticipation was high.

=== Pole Day – Saturday May 12 – Death of Art Pollard ===
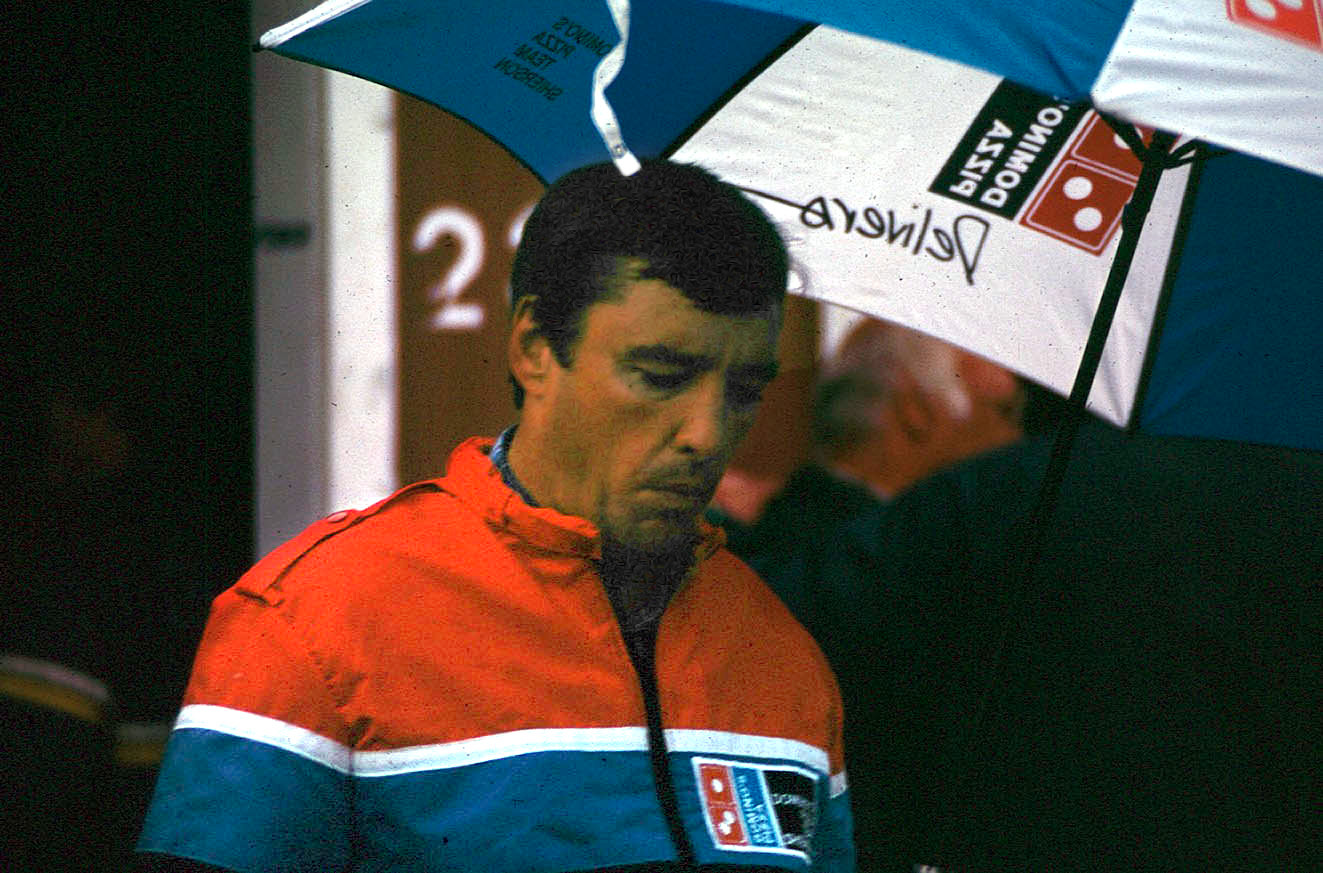
Johnny Rutherford won the pole position.

Pole day dawned sunny with high temperatures in the 70 °F (21 °C). Brief showers caused officials to turn on the yellow light a few times during the day, but they did not significantly affect the proceedings. An enormous crowd estimated at 250,000 arrived, anticipating the first ever 200 mph lap at Indy. Practice opened promptly at 9:00 a.m., but was quickly marred by the crash of Art Pollard. At 9:37 a.m., Pollard hit the outside wall in turn 1, spun to the inside, then flipped over, coming to a rest in turn two with flames and heavy damage. Pollard's injuries were reported to include pulmonary damage due to flame inhalation, third degree burns on both hands, face and neck, a fractured right arm, a fractured leg, and a severe spinal injury. He was pronounced dead at Methodist Hospital one hour and three minutes after the crash.

Despite the crash, time trials began on time at 11 a.m. Peter Revson was the first driver in the field, with a fast run of 192.606 mph (309.969 km/h). The next car out, Gary Bettenhausen, upped the mark to 195.599 mph (314.786 km/h), just short of the existing track record.

At 12:29 p.m., Swede Savage took to the track, and was the first to set records. His first lap of 197.152 mph (317.285 km/h) set a one-lap record, and his four-lap speed of 196.582 mph (316.368 km/h) was also a record. The result put him tentatively on the pole.

At 1:37 p.m., Johnny Rutherford took to the track, and electrified the crowd into a frenzy. His third lap of 199.071 mph (320.374 km/h) was just 0.21 seconds shy of the elusive 200 mph (320 km/h) barrier. his four-lap average of 198.413 mph (319.315 km/h) secured the pole position.

- Lap 1 – 45.30 seconds, 198.676 mph (319.738 km/h) (new 1-lap track record)
- Lap 2 – 45.49 seconds, 197.846 mph (318.402 km/h)
- Lap 3 – 45.21 seconds, 199.071 mph (320.374 km/h) (new 1-lap track record)
- Lap 4 – 45.44 seconds, 198.063 mph (318.752 km/h)
- Total – 3:01.44, 198.413 mph (319.315 km/h) (new 4-lap track record)

Defending race winner Mark Donohue squeezed onto the front row with a run of 197.413 mph (317.705 km/h). In the final hour, Bobby Unser was the last driver of the day with a shot at history. He came close to Rutherford, but his four-lap average of 198.183 mph (318.945 km/h) was good enough only for second starting position.

At the end of the day, the field was filled to 24 cars. A. J. Foyt (188.927 mph [304.049 km/h]) and Sam Posey (187.921 mph [302.430 km/h]) were the two slowest. Foyt, who was over 192 mph (309 km/h) during the week, waved off once, and had to settle for a slow run.

=== Second day – Sunday May 13 ===
A fairly busy second day of time trials saw six cars added to the field without incident. John Martin (194.384 mph [312.831 km/h]) was the fastest of the day. Posey and Foyt were still the two slowest cars in the field.

=== Third Day – Saturday May 19 ===
Rain kept cars off the track for most of the day. Lightning, hail, and a tornado warning, emptied the grandstands at 3 p.m. In the final ten minutes, two cars (Tom Bigelow and Sammy Sessions) made it out on the track for qualifying attempts, but neither were successful. Bigelow spun on his warm up lap, and Sessions waved off.

=== Bump Day – Sunday May 20 ===
With three spots left open in the field, the final day of time trials was expected to be busy, but saw only moderate action. Sammy Sessions was the first car out, and completed his run, slightly slower than his run a day earlier. After a down period in the mid-afternoon, the field was filled to 33 cars at 5:37 p.m. Tom Bigelow was on the bubble.

With 15 minutes left in the day. Jim McElreath bumped out Tom Bigelow. Sam Posey was now on the bubble. Next out was Jim Hurtubise, but he was 4 mph (6.4 km/h) too slow. With one minute left before the 6 o'clock gun, George Snider got in a Foyt backup car. A fast run of 190.355 mph (306.347 km/h) bumped Posey, and the field was set.

== Starting grid ==
Row	Inside		Middle		Outside	
1	7	(United States) Johnny Rutherford	8	(United States) Bobby Unser W	66	(United States) Mark Donohue W
2	40	(United States) Swede Savage	5	(United States) Gary Bettenhausen	11	(United States) Mario Andretti W
3	24	(United States) Steve Krisiloff	4	(United States) Al Unser W	21	(United States) Jimmy Caruthers
4	15	(United States) Peter Revson	20	(United States) Gordon Johncock	12	(United States) Bobby Allison R
5	60	(New Zealand) Graham McRae R	3	(United States) Roger McCluskey	18	(United States) Lloyd Ruby
6	2	(United States) Bill Vukovich II	77	(United States) Salt Walther	48	(United States) Jerry Grant
7	19	(United States) Mel Kenyon	62	(United States) Wally Dallenbach Sr.	98	(United States) Mike Mosley
8	73	(United Kingdom) David Hobbs	14	(United States) A. J. Foyt W	89	(United States) John Martin
9	16	(United States) Lee Kunzman	6	(United States) Mike Hiss	44	(United States) Dick Simon
10	30	(United States) Jerry Karl R	1	(United States) Joe Leonard	84	(United States) George Snider
11	28	(United States) Bob Harkey	9	(United States) Sammy Sessions	35	(United States) Jim McElreath

=== Alternates ===
- First alternate: Sam Posey (#34) – Bumped (Posey was disqualified and stripped of first alternate status after USAC Technical Director Frank DelRoy caught Posey's team disguising their #34 entry as another car in order to make a second qualifying attempt to avoid being bumped.)
- Second alternate: Tom Bigelow R (#27)

=== Failed to qualify ===
- Lee Brayton R (#61)
- Larry Cannon R (#59)
- Larry Dickson (#58)
- Jim Hurtubise (#56)
- Bruce Jacobi R (#78)
- Dee Jones R (#51)
- Arnie Knepper (#45, #58)
- Al Loquasto R (#86)
- John Mahler (#35)
- Larry McCoy R (#63)
- Rick Muther (#23, #97)
- Johnny Parsons R (#58, #94)
- Crockey Peterson R (#38, #96) – Failed rookie test
- Art Pollard (#64) – Fatal accident on Pole Day during practice
- Bill Puterbaugh R (#61)
- Eldon Rasmussen R (#52) – Failed rookie test
- Billy Shuman R (#52, #53) – Failed rookie test
- Bill Simpson R (#17)
- Jigger Sirois R (#47)
- Tom Sneva R (#39)
- Bentley Warren (#36, #58, #76)
- Greg Weld (#75)

== Race running ==
=== Monday May 28 – Salt Walther crash ===
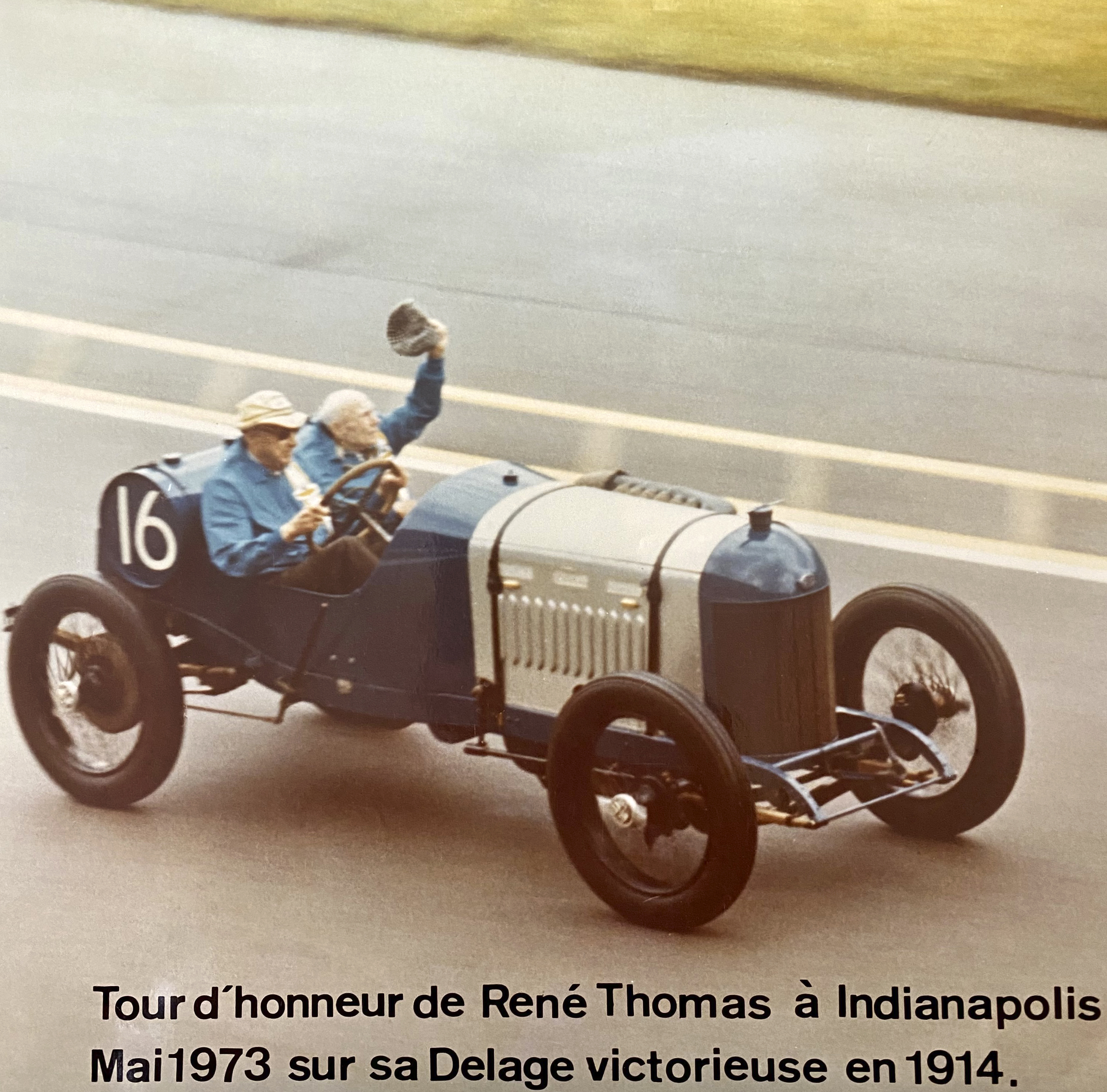
René Thomas, winner of the 500 in 1914, taking a ceremonial lap ahead of the 1973 event

On race day, a crowd estimated at 350,000 waited as morning rain delayed the proceedings for four hours and four minutes from its original scheduled time of 11:00 a.m. René Thomas, the 1914 race victor, rode for a ceremonial lap in his winning car. Tony Hulman gave the command to start engines just after 3:00 p.m., and the field pulled away for the pace laps. Bob Harkey's car did not fire, and his crew wheeled the car back to the pits. It was discovered earlier that morning that the engine had failed. Rather than withdraw (and forfeit their starting spot to Tom Bigelow, the first alternate), the crew kept the engine issue secret, and gridded the car as normal. They worked on the car briefly to give the impression that the engine failed when the starting command was given.

The 3:05 p.m. EST start was the latest until 2024, which occurred 39 minutes later (4:44 p.m. EDT or 3:44 p.m. EST). At the start, an 11-car accident unfolded on the main stretch approximately 200 yards past the start/finish line, which halted the race immediately. As the green flag fell, Steve Krisiloff's car developed ignition problems and slowed on the front straightaway, falling back to parallel with the fifth row by the time he crossed the start/finish line. This caused the rest of the field behind Krisiloff to shuffle towards the outside to avoid the slowing car. Seconds later in the sixth row, just past the start/finish line, Salt Walther tangled wheels with Jerry Grant, climbed over Grant's left-front wheel, overturned in the air and slammed into the catch fence. The car cut a 70 ft (21 m) section out of the fence on impact, breaking two 4-inch steel stanchions before being thrown back onto the track by the reinforcing cables positioned behind the fence. The impact ripped open both of Walther's fuel tanks, sending 75 gallons of flaming methanol in a massive pale blue fireball (not apparent on TV or film footage) and dousing many spectators, with the blast of heat felt at least 100 yards away in the Paddock grandstand and Track Boxes, per eyewitness accounts. Eleven grandstand spectators were injured, and nine required hospitalization. As the front of Walther's car dug into the fence, the nose was also sheared off and Walther's legs were exposed. The car landed back on the racing surface upside-down, and spun wildly down the main stretch, spraying burning fuel in all directions. The spinning car was hit by at least two other cars, and a total of at least ten other cars became involved in the crash, including: Wally Dallenbach, Mike Hiss, Lee Kunzman, John Martin, David Hobbs, Mike Mosley, Jim McElreath and Dick Simon. Several cars were damaged extensively, and debris and burning fuel now littered the track. Kunzman later recalled that he thought his eyes had been blinded by the burning fuel. The intense heat from the fire flash had melted and severely crinkled his helmet visor such that he could not see where he was going. When his car stopped he was able flip up his visor and realized he could see once again.

Walther's car came to rest upside-down near the pit exit. Walther suffered severe burns and injuries to his hands. Meanwhile, Bobby Unser had grabbed the race lead going into turn one, ahead of pole-sitter Johnny Rutherford. The race was immediately red-flagged, and the start was negated. The cars that had avoided the wreck parked at the head of the front stretch, and were eventually wheeled back to the pits. Safety crews attended to the crash scene, aided injured spectators, and also started repairing the catch fence and stanchions. The other drivers involved in the crash suffered only minor injuries (one report listed John Martin, Mike Hiss and Lee Kunzman as being treated for minor injuries at the track field hospital and released); Walther was transported to Methodist Hospital and remained hospitalized for months thereafter. Before all the cleanup and the repairs to the catchfence and two broken stanchions completed, rain began to fall again. The rest of the day was washed out, and officials rescheduled the start for 9:00 a.m. Tuesday.

=== Tuesday May 29 ===
On Tuesday May 29, the scheduled start time of the race was 9:00 a.m. At dawn, the skies were reported as clear, but soon after, rain fell in the morning hours, delaying any attempt to start until 10:15 a.m. Attendance was visibly down from Monday and estimated at 175,000–200,000.

Officials announced that the race would restart from scratch, and the single lap driven by some of the cars on Monday would not count in the scoring. Cars were gridded in their original starting positions. Bigelow was not allowed to replace Walther, who was credited with 33rd place. All cars damaged in Monday's crash were allowed to make repairs, and Bob Harkey's team installed a new engine overnight.

A heated pre-race meeting was held between the drivers and officials, and the subject of the crash and the speed of the pace car at the start was the focus. Drivers were complaining that the pace of the start (80 mph (130 km/h)) was too slow, and pointed to the ragged start of 1972 as well as reason to increase the pace car speed to 100 mph (160 km/h).

The command to fire engines was given shortly after 10 o'clock, and the field of 32 cars pulled away for the warm-up laps. On the second parade lap, a light rain began to fall, and the track was red-flagged again. The cars were halted on the main stretch to wait out the shower. Rain continued to fall most of the day. Many fans headed for the exits, and eventually crews wheeled the cars back to the garage area yet again. During the delay, a pick-up soccer game broke out on the pit lane. At 1:48 p.m., the race was postponed until Wednesday.

=== Wednesday May 30 ===
On Wednesday, morning rain threatened to wash out the race for an unprecedented third day in a row. The start time was once again slated for 9:00 a.m., but again the participants and spectators had to wait. Estimates put the Wednesday attendance as low as 20,000, 35,000, or 50–60,000, and rain check tickets were no longer asked for at the gate. However, at least one estimate put the total attendance at 125,000 once the race got going. In addition since schools were closed on the west side of Indianapolis and in the town of Speedway due to traffic jams, school busloads of kids and parents were offered free rides to the Speedway to help fill the grandstands. After over two days of rainy revelry, the infield was overwhelmed with mud and garbage. The grandstands and bathrooms were littered with trash, and the walkways and grass parking lots were flooded. The infamous Snake Pit was described as a "bog". The health department overseeing the event even threatened to keep the race from running at all if it was rained out again on Wednesday, due to the deteriorating conditions of the infield.

The mood around the garage area was glum. Crews were exhausted, and drivers were apprehensive. It was now the longest rain delay in Indy 500 history to-date (surpassed since by 1986, six days, and 2020, officially a 91-day delay caused by extenuating circumstances). Johnny Rutherford later quipped that if a poll had been taken around the garage area, the consensus would have been to leave and move on to the next race (Milwaukee). Media had already nicknamed the race the "72 Hours of Indianapolis", a play on the 24 Hours of Le Mans. The cars had sat mostly idle for the past nine days (except for the traditional Carburetion Day practice), raising separate concerns about potential mechanical and handling problems.

The delays at Indianapolis were beginning to have cascade effects on the schedule. Owing to the delay, USAC elected to postpone the next race of the season, the Rex Mays 150 at Milwaukee from June 3 to 10. Hotels, motels, and restaurants, as well as bus transit companies, airlines, and car rental companies were all jammed and some were overbooked. Local schools reported high absenteeism, and a handful of schools close to the track closed due to traffic congestion.

Around midday, the sun finally came out for a few hours, and the track surface dried enough for a race start at about 2:10 p.m.

==== Start ====
On the pace lap, the car of David Hobbs began smoking heavily. He pitted, and later rejoined the race. Bobby Unser took the lead at the start, and led the first 39 laps.

The first 56 laps were run with only two brief cautions, for only minor incidents. However, there was considerable attrition. Bobby Allison blew his engine at the completion of the first lap, Peter Revson brushed the wall in turn four on lap 3, and Mario Andretti broke a piston on lap 4.

The first yellow light came out on lap 17 when Bob Harkey's engine seized. It spilled oil, causing him to spin out and stall on the backstretch. Mark Donohue was the only one of the leaders that chose to pit during the yellow. Bobby Unser continued to lead, with Gordon Johncock running second, and Johnny Rutherford third. A. J. Foyt coasted to a stop in the pits after 37 laps with a broken rod bolt. Bobby Unser made his first pit stop on lap 40, briefly handing the lead to Johncock. Unser's pit stop dragged on for almost 45 seconds, and Swede Savage took over third.

Johncock led laps 40–42, then made a pit stop. The lead was assumed by Swede Savage on lap 43, with Al Unser now second. Joe Leonard brought out the yellow for two minutes when he spun on lap 45 in the north chute between turns 3 and 4. Savage and Al Unser battled closely for several laps, with the lapped car of Roger McCluskey also in the mix. Unser was able to get by McCluskey on the backstretch on lap 53. He then made a slingshot pass around Savage for the lead going into turn one on lap 54.

On lap 55, Johnny Rutherford was given the black flag and went to the pits to check for leaking fluid. At the same time, Mark Donohue's car slowed and he went to the pits (and later dropped out) with a bad piston in what was his final 500.

By lap 57, only 22 cars of the starting field of 33 were on track.

==== Swede Savage crash and death of Armando Teran ====
On the 57th lap, Swede Savage made a pit stop. His car was filled with 70 US gal (260 L) of methanol and fitted with a new right rear tire. On lap 59, Savage was in 2nd place, a few seconds behind race leader Al Unser. As Unser committed to a lap 59 pit stop ahead of him, Savage lost control of his car as he exited turn four. The car twitched back and forth, and then slid across to the inside of the track at nearly top speed. It hit the angled inside wall nearly head-on. The force of the impact, with the car carrying a full load of fuel in both tanks, caused the car to explode in a plume of flame. The force of the fuel exploding was so great that some structural rivets were blown rearward out of the car. The engine and transaxle tumbled end-over-end to the pit lane entrance while Savage, still strapped in his seat, was thrown back across the circuit. Savage came to rest adjacent to the outer retaining wall, fully conscious and completely exposed while he sat in a pool of flaming methanol fuel. The other cars on the track quickly stopped in turn four, as the track was completely blocked with debris and fire. A now third red flag was displayed at the flag stand which stopped the race at 3:05 p.m..

Track and safety crews immediately descended onto the crash scene to aid Savage. One fire truck, driven by fire/safety truck driver Jerry Flake, was signaled to head to the scene by Cleon Reynolds, the Chief of the Speedway Fire Department. Flake was stationed at the south end of the pits, and had to traverse the pit lane 'against traffic' to reach the Savage crash as quickly as possible. Driving a safety vehicle against the flow of racing and pit traffic was permissible in the USAC safety rules of 1973, and Reynolds' hand signal to Flake specifically instructed him to do exactly this. Flake reported "laying on the horn" and slow progress through the pit lane as people were in the way.

As Flake began speeding toward Savage's crash via the pit lane, numerous pit crew members from several teams moved to cross pit lane, toward the grass infield at trackside. Among those who did was George Bignotti, chief mechanic for Gordon Johncock, and 22-year-old Armando Teran, pit board man for Graham McRae. "I had just crossed the lane", Bignotti begins. Flake, driving northbound in pit lane at high speed, describes what he saw: "All of a sudden things cleared up on the pit road and I had a clear shot all the way up to Savage's car which I could see burning. Then out of nowhere, a guy was in front of me..."

Flake's truck struck Teran, his body tossed about 50 ft (15 m), an impact violent enough to knock him out of his shoes. As Bignotti relays it, "I heard the car coming, and — whap — it hit him". The incident was easily seen by thousands of spectators, as it occurred on the pit lane at the start/finish line. Teran suffered crushed ribs and a broken skull, and although he lived through the initial impact, he died shortly afterward after being transported to Methodist Hospital.

It was erroneously reported by media that Flake was at fault in the Teran collision because of driving against racing traffic; in 1973, safety trucks were permitted by USAC to drive in the opposite direction of the racing cars as Flake had done. The following year, USAC specifically prohibited safety trucks from driving in the opposite direction. For Teran's part, there was no rule forbidding him from leaving the pit wall, as a team's pit board, or "chalkboard" man, either.

==== Finish ====
Savage was taken to the hospital with third degree burns and flame inhalation, but was in stable condition. After a red flag delay of about an hour and eleven minutes, the two crash scenes were cleared; the race resumed at 4:16 pm. After witnessing the Savage crash, a disconsolate George Snider decided to climb out of his car for the day. He turned it over to A. J. Foyt, his car owner. Foyt himself had already dropped out on lap 37, and was standing by in case he was needed for relief.

The race restarted on lap 61 with Al Unser leading, and attrition continued to take a toll on the field. On lap 73, Jimmy Caruthers violently blew his right front tire on the main stretch. The tire had suffered a puncture due to debris from Wally Dallenbach's blown engine. The suspension was damaged, but he was able to maintain control of the car, and coasted around to the pit area. Al Unser's day ended with a blown engine on lap 75, and Gordon Johncock, another of Savage's Patrick Racing/STP teammates, assumed the lead.

In quick succession, seven cars dropped out between laps 91 and 101, including Bobby Unser, A. J. Foyt (in George Snider's car), and Dick Simon. The race finally reached the halfway point, and became official upon the completion of lap 101. By this time, only eleven cars were still running, just two on the lead lap. Gordon Johncock was leading and Bill Vukovich II had climbed all the way up to second position. Track officials began assembling victory lane, as dark skies were looming, evening was soon approaching, and they did not expect the race to go the full distance. There was brief confusion over scoring, and officials were sent to bring Vukovich's wife, Joyce, to victory lane. Vukovich refused to come down until her husband had been confirmed the winner, during which it was discovered that scoring had briefly been interrupted after someone accidentally kicked out a power cable.

Jerry Karl, after about two hours of repairs in the pits, rejoined the race running over 100 laps down. He was able to move up to 26th place.

On the 129th lap a light rain began to fall, and the yellow light came on with Gordon Johncock leading. Only eleven cars were still on the track. After 133 laps, at about 5:30 p.m., the rain started to fall much harder, forcing the fourth and final red flag to come out. Although officials had not yet decided to call the race, it was obvious to everyone that the race was over; when the rain came, it was near-dusk, and the track was soon "lost" to the moisture, necessitating a lengthy drying period, which the remaining daylight would not provide. Johncock's Patrick Racing crew began to celebrate, along with a post-race winner's interview with a mostly despondent co-owner Andy Granatelli. Minutes after Granatelli's interview, officials declared the race complete, with Johncock the winner. Johncock led the most laps with a total of 64.

==== Post-race ====
The 1973 race was the shortest "500" on record at the time (332.5 mi [535.1 km]), with the exception of the 1916 race, which was actually scheduled for 300 mi (480 km). Three years later, the 1976 race was halted at an even shorter distance of 255 mi (410 km), just past the halfway point when the race became official on lap 101.

The traditional victory banquet was canceled earlier in the day, and the victory lane celebration was fairly brief and muted. Johncock left the track soon after the race to visit Savage at the hospital, along with team owner Pat Patrick. Johncock and Patrick, and a few other crew members ended the day with a "victory dinner" which consisted of fast food hamburgers at the Burger Chef just east of the Speedway on Georgetown Road. BorgWarner gave Johncock a ceremony for his 1973 win in August 2021 at his forestry mill in South Branch, Michigan to celebrate his 85th birthday, with the trophy (riding in a Verizon 200 marked van) visiting landmarks in the city in addition to his forestry mill.

The Johncock family—featuring Gordon, his wife Sue, children, grandchildren, and great-grandchildren, along with surviving crew members of both the 1973 and 1982 wins, were given an official victory celebration for the 1973 win on April 24, 2023. The Speedway museum rolled out his 1982 race winner, and the family was given a tour of the oval on a Speedway bus. Following the museum tour, the formal victory banquet for the 1973 win was held at Binkley's Kitchen and Bar on North College Avenue in Indianapolis, where BorgWarner presented Gordon with the Champion Driver's Trophy, awarded to winners since 1988, and in more recent years given to drivers on milestone anniversaries of their race wins, and Sue a bouquet of flowers.

== Aftermath ==
The race and its safety concerns caused immediate uproar among racing owners, crew, and track owners. Two days after the race, team owner Andy Granatelli (whose car, driven by Johncock, won the race), declared that he would withdraw from USAC racing in 1974 unless changes were made. On June 2, Dr. Joseph Mattioli, owner of Pocono International Raceway, was calling for USAC to make changes "(restricting) speeds of the race car so that we can once again have auto races that are competitive, exciting, and relatively safe" for the next 500-mile race on the USAC schedule in early July.

USAC acted quickly. On the evening of June 2, 1973, the weekend after the race, USAC held an unscheduled meeting, revising rules. The large rear wings used in 1972–73 were cut back in size from 64 to 55 in (160 to 140 cm), fuel tank capacity was drastically reduced from 75 to 40 US gal (280 to 150 L) with the single tank mandated to be placed in the left sidepod, and the allowable fuel to be consumed in a 500-mile race was reduced from 375 to 340 US gal (1,420 to 1,290 L). Those changes were designed to slow the cars down. USAC also created a rule specifically disallowing the pit sign carrier from leaving his post as Teran did, for the duration of a race. (The pit signs have since been replaced by two-way radio communication, and after 2013 were prohibited during the race.) All of these rule changes were effective as of the Pocono 500 at Pocono Raceway to be held on July 1, 1973. USAC also delayed the Rex Mays 150 race in Milwaukee one week, to June 9–10, because of the lengthy delay in running the Indianapolis 500 race.

On July 2, 33 days after his on track injury, Swede Savage died in the hospital from complications arising from his injuries and treatment. The true cause of his death remains a point of dispute. It had been widely reported that Savage's death was caused by kidney failure, while others have said that Savage died from lung failure due to flame inhalation. Dr. Steve Olvey, Savage's attending physician (and later CART's director of medical affairs), claimed in his book Rapid Response that the real cause of death was complications related to contaminated plasma. Olvey claimed that Savage contracted hepatitis B from a transfusion, causing his liver to fail. According to Savage's father, the percentage of oxygen they were giving Swede just prior to his death, due to the damage to his lungs from the flames inhaled from the accident, was such that there was no way he could have survived, even if he had not contracted hepatitis B. Lung failure was repeated as the cause of death by Savage's daughter Angela in a May 2015 interview.

At the Indianapolis Motor Speedway, several safety changes were made for the 1974 race. The angled inside wall at the northwest corner of the track (which had also played a role in the Dave MacDonald/Eddie Sachs double-fatality in 1964) was removed, and the pit entrance was widened. Retaining walls were heightened and catch fences were improved around the track. A flag stand for the race starter and other officials was built over the outside wall of the track directly above the start-finish line (previously the starter was positioned down at the inside wall of the track itself). In addition, some spectator areas were moved back away from the track, and all of the rows of Track Box seats along the front stretch were removed. There was not another on-track fatality at the Indianapolis Motor Speedway until 1982 in which Gordon Smiley died in qualifying. Gordon Johncock also won that race.

As of 2023, Savage's death in 1973 is the last driver fatality at the Speedway that occurred as a result of a crash during the Indianapolis 500 itself, but the last fatality at the Speedway as a result of a race crash was a 2010 MotoGP support race where a 13-year old rider was killed on the formation lap.

== Box score ==
Finish	Start	No	Name	Chassis	Engine	Tire	Qual	Laps	Status	Points
1	11	20	(United States) Gordon Johncock	Eagle	Offenhauser	G	192.555	133	159.036 mph	1000
2	16	2	(United States) Bill Vukovich II	Eagle	Offenhauser	G	191.103	133	+1:24.91	800
3	14	3	(United States) Roger McCluskey	McLaren	Offenhauser	G	191.929	131	Flagged (-2 laps)	700
4	19	19	(United States) Mel Kenyon	Eagle	Foyt V-8	G	190.224	131	Flagged (-2 laps)	600
5	5	5	(United States) Gary Bettenhausen	McLaren	Offenhauser	G	195.599	130	Flagged (-3 laps)	500
6	7	24	(United States) Steve Krisiloff	Kingfish	Offenhauser	F	194.932	129	Flagged (-4 laps)	400
7	25	16	(United States) Lee Kunzman	Eagle	Offenhauser	G	193.092	127	Flagged (-6 laps)	300
8	24	89	(United States) John Martin	McLaren	Offenhauser	G	194.385	124	Flagged (-9 laps)	250
9	1	7	(United States) Johnny Rutherford	McLaren	Offenhauser	G	198.413	124	Flagged (-9 laps)	200
10	21	98	(United States) Mike Mosley	Eagle	Offenhauser	F	189.753	120	Rod bolt	150
11	22	73	(United Kingdom) David Hobbs	Eagle	Offenhauser	G	189.454	107	Flagged (-26 laps)	
12	30	84	(United States) George Snider (A. J. Foyt Laps 59–101)	Coyote	Foyt V-8	G	190.355	101	Gearbox	
13	2	8	(United States) Bobby Unser W	Eagle	Offenhauser	G	198.183	100	Blown engine	
14	27	44	(United States) Dick Simon	Eagle	Foyt V-8	G	191.276	100	Piston	
15	3	66	(United States) Mark Donohue W	Eagle	Offenhauser	G	197.412	92	Piston	
16	13	60	(New Zealand) Graham McRae R	Eagle	Offenhauser	G	192.030	91	Header	
17	26	6	(United States) Mike Hiss	Eagle	Offenhauser	G	191.939	91	Drive train	
18	29	1	(United States) Joe Leonard	Parnelli	Offenhauser	F	189.953	91	Wheel	
19	18	48	(United States) Jerry Grant	Eagle	Offenhauser	G	190.235	77	Blown engine	
20	8	4	(United States) Al Unser W	Parnelli	Offenhauser	F	194.879	75	Piston	
21	9	21	(United States) Jimmy Caruthers	Eagle	Offenhauser	F	194.217	73	Suspension	
22	4	40	(United States) Swede Savage ✝	Eagle	Offenhauser	G	196.582	57	Crash FS	
23	33	35	(United States) Jim McElreath	Eagle	Offenhauser	G	188.640	54	Blown engine	
24	20	62	(United States) Wally Dallenbach Sr.	Eagle	Offenhauser	G	190.200	48	Broken rod	
25	23	14	(United States) A. J. Foyt W	Coyote	Foyt V-8	G	188.927	37	Rod bolt	
26	28	30	(United States) Jerry Karl R	Eagle	Chevrolet	G	190.799	22	Flagged (-111 laps)	
27	15	18	(United States) Lloyd Ruby	Eagle	Offenhauser	F	191.622	21	Piston	
28	32	9	(United States) Sammy Sessions	Eagle	Foyt V-8	G	188.986	17	Out of oil	
29	31	28	(United States) Bob Harkey	Kenyon-Eagle	Foyt V-8	G	189.734	12	Seized engine	
30	6	11	(United States) Mario Andretti W	Parnelli	Offenhauser	F	195.059	4	Piston	
31	10	15	(United States) Peter Revson	McLaren	Offenhauser	G	192.607	3	Crash (turn four)	
32	12	12	(United States) Bobby Allison R	McLaren	Offenhauser	G	192.308	1	Rod	
33	17	77	(United States) Salt Walther	McLaren	Offenhauser	G	190.739	0	Crash FS	

Note: Relief drivers in parentheses

W Former Indianapolis 500 winner

R Indianapolis 500 Rookie

=== Race statistics ===
Lap Leaders
Laps	Leader
1–39	Bobby Unser
40–42	Gordon Johncock
43–54	Swede Savage
55–72	Al Unser Sr.
73–133	Gordon Johncock

Total laps led
Driver	Laps
Gordon Johncock	64
Bobby Unser	39
Al Unser Sr.	18
Swede Savage	12

PACER Yellow Light Periods
5 for 17 laps
Laps*	Reason
Monday May 28
Start	Salt Walther crash on frontstretch (red flag)
Tuesday May 29
Pace lap	Rain (red flag)
Wednesday May 30
16–20	Bob Harkey engine seized, spun on back stretch (7 minutes)
45–46	Joe Leonard spun in northchute (2 minutes)
59–60	Swede Savage crash in turn 4 (red flag of 1 hour and 11 minutes)
73–75	Jimmy Caruthers shredded tire on main stretch
129–133	Rain (red flag, end of race)
* – Approximate lap counts

Tire participation chart
Supplier	No. of starters
Goodyear	26*
Firestone	7
* – Denotes race winner

== Broadcasting ==
=== Radio ===
The race was carried live on the IMS Radio Network. Sid Collins served as chief announcer and Fred Agabashian served as "driver expert", replacing Len Sutton. Fred Agabashian returned after a six-year absence. The race was held over three days, and the network covered activities live on all three days.

This would be Mike Ahern's final race with the network crew. For 1973, the turn two reporting location was moved to the new VIP Suites, which had just been constructed. Bob Forbes served as wireless roving reporter, concentrating on the garage area.

At the conclusion of the race, Lou Palmer reported from victory lane.

Indianapolis Motor Speedway Radio Network
Booth Announcers	Turn Reporters	Pit/garage reporters
Chief Announcer: Sid Collins; Driver expert: Fred Agabashian; Statistician: John DeCamp; Historian: Donald Davidson	Turn 1: Mike Ahern; Turn 2: Howdy Bell; Backstretch: Doug Zink; Turn 3: Ron Carrell; Turn 4: Jim Shelton	Chuck Marlowe (north); Luke Walton (center); Lou Palmer (south); Bob Forbes (garages)

=== Television ===
The race was carried in the United States on ABC Sports on a same-day tape delay basis. The race was scheduled to air on Monday May 28 at 9 p.m. EDT for a two-hour same-day tape delay broadcast. However, the race suffered the crash of Salt Walther and rain prevented it from being restarted. The network showed a brief clip of Walther's crash, then filled the rest of the timeslot with a movie instead. On Tuesday May 29, the race was to be rescheduled for 9 a.m., but it was again rained out as well. On Wednesday May 30, the race was finally held, and ABC planned to air the broadcast in primetime on Wednesday night at 8 p.m. EDT. The broadcast featured a rebroadcast of Monday's aborted attempt at a start, as well as the conclusion on Wednesday.

Analyst Jackie Stewart was to be the color commentator, but was only able to be at the grounds on Monday and Tuesday as he left the Speedway Wednesday for Formula One commitments at the 1973 Monaco Grand Prix which he won. Chris Economaki substituted for Stewart in the booth on Wednesday. On Wednesday, Chris Schenkel rode and reported from inside the pace car.

Because of the long delay after Swede Savage's accident, some of the later portions of the race were still being edited as the beginning of the race was being broadcast.

The race was billed on ABC as "Goodyear Presents the Indianapolis 500 Race".

The broadcast re-aired on ESPN Classic for the first time on August 12, 2011. The broadcast was slightly edited from the original airing, as a scene in the immediate aftermath of Armando Teran's fatal accident was omitted (but is still available on YouTube). The broadcast was shown again on ESPN Classic on May 30, 2013 (the 40th anniversary).

ABC Television
Booth Announcers	Pit/garage reporters
Host: Chris Schenkel; Announcer: Jim McKay; Color: Jackie Stewart (Mon. & Tues.); Color: Chris Economaki (Wed.)	Dave Diles; Don Hein

== Documentary films ==
Several documentary films were also produced discussing the 1973 Indianapolis 500. These include:

The 200 MPH Barrier, narrated by Ralph Camargo, Dynamic Films (for Ashland Oil)

Catastrophe (1977), narrated by William Conrad (the 1973 Indianapolis 500 is one of the film's subjects)

Fire and Rain, for the STP-sponsored Patrick Racing teams (Johncock, McRae, Savage), Allend'or Productions

The Longest May, narrated by Tom Carnegie, McGraw-Hill productions

The Indianapolis 500: The 70s, narrated by Tom Carnegie (1973 was featured including interviews by the drivers who were there)

Going to Extremes (for Castrol)

== Notes ==
=== Works cited ===
- 1973 Indianapolis 500 Press Information - Daily Trackside Summary
- Indianapolis 500 History: Race & All-Time Stats - Official Site
- 1973 Indianapolis 500 at RacingReference.info
- 1973 Indianapolis 500 Radio Broadcast, Indianapolis Motor Speedway Radio Network

1972 Indianapolis 500; Mark Donohue	1973 Indianapolis 500; Gordon Johncock	1974 Indianapolis 500; Johnny Rutherford
