= 1974 Indianapolis 500 =

American motor race

58th Indianapolis 500
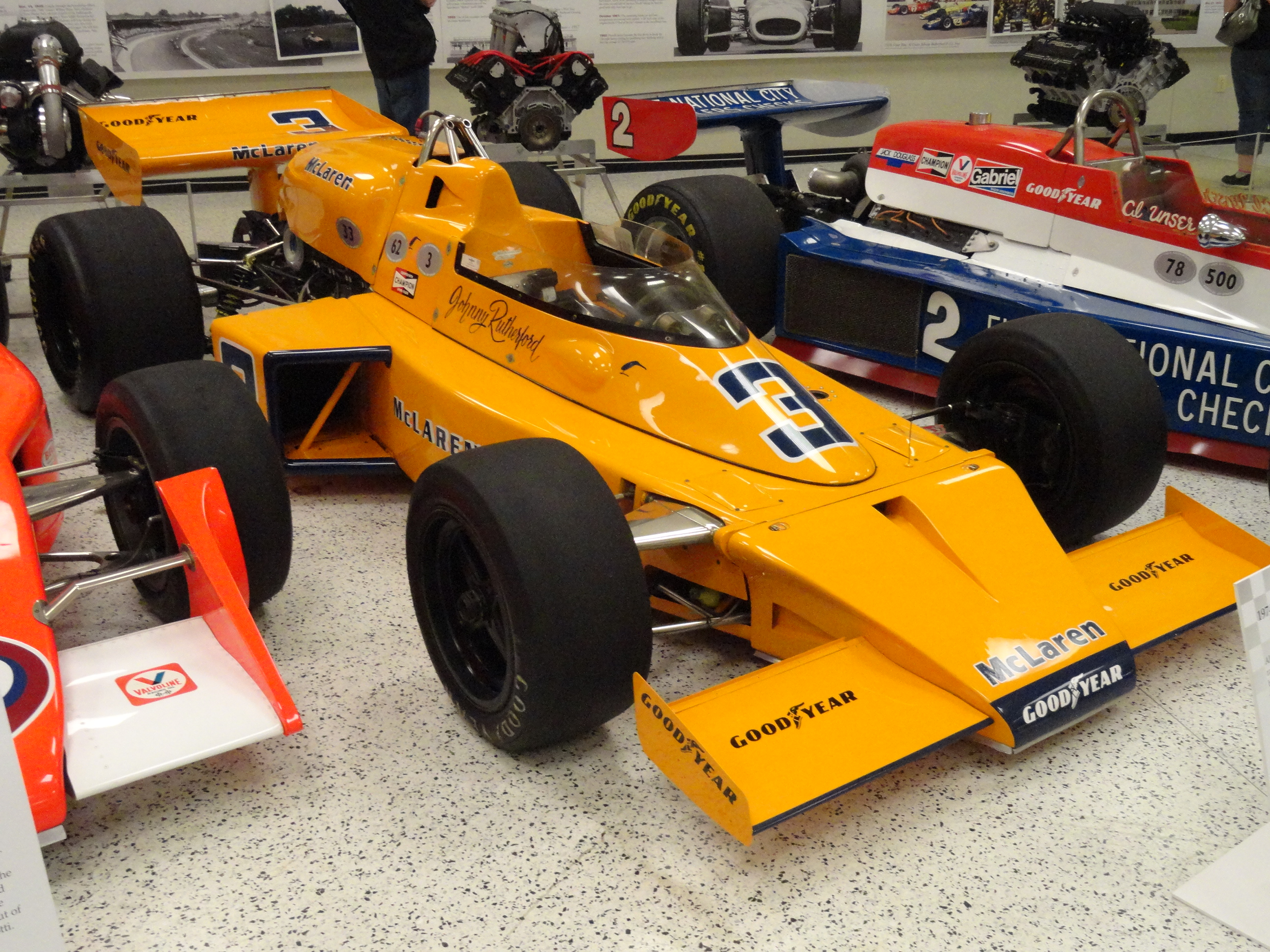

Indianapolis Motor Speedway

Indianapolis 500
- Sanctioning body: USAC
- Season: 1974 USAC Trail
- Date: May 26, 1974
- Winner: Johnny Rutherford
- Winning team: McLaren
- Winning Chief Mechanic: Denis Daviss
- Time of race: 3:09:10.06
- Average speed: 158.589 mph (255.224 km/h)
- Pole position: A. J. Foyt
- Pole speed: 191.632 mph (308.402 km/h)
- Fastest qualifier: A. J. Foyt
- Rookie of the Year: Pancho Carter
- Most laps led: Johnny Rutherford (122)

Pre-race ceremonies
- National anthem: Purdue Band
- "Back Home Again in Indiana": Jim Nabors
- Starting command: Tony Hulman
- Pace car: Hurst/Olds Cutlass
- Pace car driver: Jim Rathmann
- Starter: Pat Vidan
- Estimated attendance: 275,000

Television in the United States
- Network: ABC
- Announcers: Jim McKay and Sam Posey
- Nielsen ratings: 16.4 / 31

Chronology
Previous	Next
1973	1975

The 58th 500 Mile International Sweepstakes was held at the Indianapolis Motor Speedway in Speedway, Indiana on Sunday, May 26, 1974. Johnny Rutherford, in his eleventh attempt, won the race from the 25th starting position, the farthest back since Louis Meyer in 1936. It was the first of his three Indy victories, and started a three-year stretch where he finished 1st–2nd–1st.

The race was run relatively clean, with no major crashes or injuries, a sharp contrast from the tragic 1973 event. In order to increase safety, significant improvements were made to the track and cars. Wings were reduced in size, fuel tank capacity was reduced, and pop-off valves were added to the turbocharger plenums in order to reduce horsepower and curtail speeds.

For the first time in Indy history, the race was scheduled for the Sunday of Memorial Day weekend. This ended the "never on a Sunday" policy previously held from 1911 to 1973. At the time, it was also the earliest calendar date (May 26) that the race had ever been held. With the implementation of the Uniform Monday Holiday Act in 1971, the holiday was now observed on the last Monday of May (25–31), creating a three-day weekend (Saturday–Monday) every year.

On race day, A. J. Foyt broke the all-time record for most career starts at Indianapolis. The 1974 race was his 17th Indy 500 start (all consecutive), breaking the record of 16 previously held by Cliff Bergere and Chet Miller. Foyt would go on to start a total of 35 consecutive races (1958–1992), and as of 2026, still holds the record for most starts.

== Race schedule ==
The race was run in the wake of the energy crisis, which precipitated several changes to the schedule. During the offseason, government officials were pressuring sports and recreational organizations to curtail their energy consumption. Track management did not want to shorten the traditional 500-mile race distance, but agreed to voluntarily curtail other track activities. In the first half of 1974, NASCAR decided to trim all of their race distances by 10%, as well as scale back practice and ancillary events. The 1974 Daytona 500 was notably trimmed by 20 laps (the race officially started on lap 21), and ran a total distance of only 450 miles. Furthermore, the 24 Hours of Daytona and 12 Hours of Sebring were canceled outright.

USAC opted to cut a week of practice out of the schedule for the Indy 500. Previously, the track would customarily open for practice on May 1 (or as early as the Saturday before May 1). For 1974, the track opened three weeks before the race. Time trials were cut back from four days to two. Pole day would be held on the Saturday two weeks before the race, and Bump Day would be held on the Saturday one week before the race.

In addition, the track would begin opening on practice days around 12 noon, rather than the previous 9 a.m. Normally, the first few hours of practice were quiet and leisurely with few cars taking advantage of the track time. Thus they were deemed superfluous and excessive on resources and operating costs. This change was also introduced because it made logical sense to have drivers practicing on the track at the same time of day as they would be running in time trials and the race itself (theoretically it would better mimic the conditions encountered on those days).

The reduced on-track time was seen as a way to reduce overall fuel consumption – fewer days that fans would drive their cars to the track – but a mostly insignificant reduction of the actual methanol fuel used by the race cars. In general, the schedule changes were well-received by participants, as it doubled as a cost-saving measure. The changes for the most part were made permanent, with one notable exception: for 1975, time trials reverted to four days.

Race schedule – May, 1974
Sun	Mon	Tue	Wed	Thu	Fri	Sat
			1	2	3	4
5	6 Opening Day	7 Practice	8 Practice	9 Practice	10; Practice	11; Pole Day
12; Practice	13; Practice	14; Practice	15; Practice	16; Practice	17; Practice	18; Bump Day
19	20	21	22	23; Carb Day	24	25; Parade
26; Indy 500	27; Memorial Day	28	29	30	31	

Color	Notes
Green	Practice
Dark Blue	Time trials
Silver	Race day
Red	Rained out*
Blank	No track activity

* Includes days where track
activity was significantly
limited due to rain

== Background ==
=== Safety improvements ===
After the tragic 1973 race, several changes were made to the course, as well as the car rules. The pit lane was widened, and lengthened to the north by about 856 feet. In addition, the inside wall from turn 4 to the pit entrance, which had played a part in the fatal 1973 crash that killed Swede Savage and the 1964 crash that killed Dave MacDonald and Eddie Sachs, was moved in, which allowed cars to have a much easier entrance into the pit lane as asphalt replaced grass in that area. The heights of the inside and outside retaining walls were also raised and set at a uniform height, a second safety fence was added to the existing fencing throughout, and several rows of trackside seats on the main straightaway were removed.

Also part of the improvements were a new flagstand and officials' booth. Tom Binford, the new chief steward for 1974, requested the construction of an elevated booth, to be located on the outside of the track at the start/finish line. The flagging duties were moved to the new perch. Previously they were done from a small trackside platform on the inside grass along the pit lane, and prior to that, on the race track itself. Though flagman Pat Vidan did not particularly like the confines of the new flagstand (it constricted his grandiose waving style), the officials preferred their improved view of the track and the isolation the booth provided (previously the officials were stationed on the pit lane, in full ear of the often confrontational participants).

Just three days after the 1973 race, USAC held an urgent meeting to draft emergency rule changes in time for the Pocono 500. Rear wings were reduced in size from 64 inches to 55 inches. On-board fuel capacity was reduced from 70 US gal (58 imp gal; 260 L) down to 40 US gal (33 imp gal; 150 L), and fuel tanks were only allowed on the left side of the car, with the exception of a 2 1/2 gallon pick-up tank. An energy-absorbing material was to be placed in the spot formerly occupied by the right-side tank, and total fuel allotment for the 500 miles was reduced from 375 to 340 gallons. By May 1974, the rules were changed once more, further reducing the total fuel allotment to 280 gallons, and rear wings down to 43 inches.

Three-time Formula One World Champion Jackie Stewart who was reporting for ABC Sports filmed a piece on improved safety and he said "The cars wishing to enter the pitlane should continue though turn four low on the racetrack on the new black surface. I don't much like the idea of the infield to be used by emergency equipment to go in the opposite direction of the race cars themselves but of course these are ambulances and wreckers so it may have to happen. The pit lane has been extended by a full one and a half football fields in length, it's demarcation point is this structure. Now this I disapprove of because if a race car hit's this, it's going to be a horrible accident and I think it's unnecessary. The new pit lane operation however I think is going to be considerably safer and considerably better then what we ever seen at Indianapolis before." Stewart then question Binford about the changes saying "I think they are two benefits that I could think of off hand, one of is that we can bring the pace car off sooner then [sic] we were able to do in the past, out and away from the field in the fourth turn."

=== Rule changes ===
In response to the fatal accident of pit crew member Armando Teran in 1973, safety trucks were prohibited from driving on the racing surface in the opposite direction of the racing cars. Teran was struck by a fire truck rushing to the scene of Swede Savage's accident.

During time trials, all cars were required to carry a pop-off valve to control turbocharger "boost." Maximum boost levels were set at 80 inHG. The reduction of boost, reduction of wing sizes, and other technical changes lowered speeds by about 8–10 mph from 1973. As a result, top speeds would be around 190 mph, and the elusive 200 mph barrier would be out-of-reach for 1974.

In addition to the aforementioned race day restrictions, fuel restrictions were also put into place for practice and time trials. Each car would be permitted 300 gallons for practice (including Carburetion Day), and 50 gallons for time trials. Rookie drivers were allowed an extra 12 1/2 gallons to be used during rookie tests only. Unused fuel from practice could not be carried over, or given to another team. However, any leftover fuel from time trials could be used on Carb Day.

During time trials, a new safety rule was put into place to convey to the officials the start of a qualifying attempt. When a driver was on his three warm-up laps, a crew member(s) from his team was now stationed at the north end of the mainstretch, and provided with two flags (green and yellow). When the car came around after the third and final warm-up lap, the crew member was instructed to wave a green flag in the air to signify the driver will begin the run. If the crew waves a yellow flag, or waves no flag, the run does not start, the car returns to the pits, and the attempt does not count. As in previous years, each car was still permitted up to three official qualifying attempts.

Previously, the driver himself would make the decision on whether to start the qualifying run. He would do so by raising his hand in the air as he approached the start/finish line. Due to the significantly rising speeds, and the awkwardness of doing so in the increasingly confined cockpits, this practice was abandoned. For instance, during qualifying in 1970, Lloyd Ruby raised his hand to make his attempt, but officials did not see it, and inadvertently waved him off. After he persuaded the officials for a do-over, he burned a piston. It was also in the interest of safety, reflecting upon an incident that involved Bobby Grim during the 1959 race. Grim suffered magneto failure and began coasting to the pits. As was customary for drivers of the time, he raised his arm to signify to the other drivers he had lost power. However, due to the high speed he was still traveling, he painfully dislocated his arm in the process.

This new arrangement also made it simpler for the crew to "wave off" an unsatisfactory attempt already in progress. At any time during the four-lap run, if the crew was dissatisfied with the performance, they could wave a yellow flag, and officials would immediately abort the run. Crews could now wave off a run without needing input from, or conveying the message to, the driver out on the track. Previously the only way to wave off a run was to pull into the pits. Typically, crew members would use hand-held stopwatches and clock their car from a reference point in turn four. That would give them enough time to estimate their forthcoming lap time, and decide whether to abort the run before the car crossed the start/finish line. Furthermore, the rules made it clear that the instant the yellow flag was waved by the crew, the run was aborted, irrespective of the position of the car out on the track. If the car continued down the mainstretch, it would not matter if he/she proceeded to cross the finish line. Previously, if a car physically crossed the finish line, the run counted and was locked in, even if the team was intending to wave off the run. That situation made for some precarious maneuvers to the pit lane or to cars stopping out on the track to avoid crossing the finish line and 'locking in' the undesirable qualifying time.

=== Departure of Firestone ===
The 1974 race would be the last, temporarily, for Firestone, who dropped out of Indy car competition effective at the end of the season. Firestone had been a fixture at the Indianapolis 500 dating back to 1911. Firestone-shod cars had won the Indianapolis 500 a total of 48 times to date (out of 57 previous races), including the first race and 43 consecutive from 1920 to 1966. By the mid-1960s, Goodyear had joined the sport, and began a fiercely-competitive "tire war". Firestone had not won the Indy 500 since Al Unser won back-to-back in 1970–1971. Starting in 1975, Goodyear became the lone tire supplier for Championship/Indy Car racing and the Indy 500 - an arrangement that would continue through 1994. Firestone made a heralded return to Indy car competition in 1995, and eventually became the exclusive tire supplier starting in 2000.

== Time trials ==
Due to the ongoing energy crisis, qualifying was scheduled for only two days (Saturday May 11 and Saturday May 18), down from the traditional four days. Each day was slated to have two separate sessions, an "early" session from 11:00 a.m. to 2:30 p.m., followed by a "late" session from 2:30 p.m. to 6:00 p.m. The four total sessions were intended to mimic the traditional four days. The pole position was to be the fastest driver during the "early" session on the first day (May 11).

New chief steward Tom Binford was adamant that he was preparing to have the gun fire at exactly 2:30 p.m. to close the pole round. However, several observers noted that the 3 1/2 hours allotted for that pole round would not be enough time to make it through the entire qualifying draw (at least 46 cars). As a result, most expected the pole round to be extended at least until the original draw order exhausted. Qualifiers from the "late" session on May 11 would line up behind the qualifiers from the "early" session, followed by the "early" and "late" session qualifiers on May 18.

Rain, however, threw a wrench into the entire plan on both days. Pole qualifying ended up stretching well into the second day. Once the pole round was finally completed, second day qualifying commenced. The original four sessions plan was partially scrapped.

=== First Day - May 11 ===
Pole qualifying was scheduled for the "early" session of Saturday May 11. A. J. Foyt drew the first spot in the qualifying order, and was the first car to make an attempt when the track opened at 11 a.m. His four-lap speed of 191.632 mph placed him tentatively on the pole position.

Wally Dallenbach completed a run of 189.683 mph, which put him in second starting position. His car featured a controversial "king sized" turbocharger, which some competitors complained was too large to be controlled by the standard issue pop-off valves. Ultimately, Dallenbach's blower was deemed legal, but USAC ruled that the team had to use the same turbo in the race. They would not be allowed to swap it out for the more fuel-conservative smaller turbo on race day.

At 12:25 p.m. rain halted qualifying. Only nine cars had completed an attempt.

At 3:35 p.m., the track was dried, and qualifying resumed. Five more cars were able to take to the track, but rain returned, and the track was closed for the day at 4:20 p.m. The field was only filled to 15 cars, and several drivers, including Mario Andretti and Gordon Johncock were still in line and eligible for the pole. Al Unser and Johnny Rutherford, however, both suffered blown engines during the morning practice session. Both teams made engine changes, but USAC declared them ineligible for the pole round since they were not in line at the stroke of 11 o'clock. Unser and Rutherford, both angered by the ruling, were forced to forfeit their respective spots in the qualifying line. Both would have to be second-day qualifiers. USAC officials briefly contemplated but rejected a plan to finish the pole round on Sunday May 12. Time trials would resume on May 18.

=== Second Day - May 18 ===
The track opened to continue time trials on Saturday May 18. Eleven cars were still eligible for the pole position round. Gordon Johncock was the first driver out, and he completed a run of 186.287 mph. The next car out was Mike Hiss, who qualified for the third position at 187.490 mph. Mario Andretti was the last driver who was a factor for the pole, but he ended up fifth. At 12:30 p.m., the pole round was officially over, with A. J. Foyt holding on to the pole position. The field officially was filled to 24 cars.

As soon as the pole round had concluded, the Second Day "early" session began. Rick Muther completed his run, filling the field to 25 cars. Bob Harkey was the next driver out, but rain began to fall during his warm-up lap. The track was closed for over three hours. Officials deemed Muther the lone Second Day "early" qualifier.

At 4:20 p.m., the track was dried and re-opened for the Second Day "late" session – the equivalent of Bump Day. Bob Harkey was re-dispatched, and he became the 26th qualifier. Johnny Rutherford, who missed out on the pole round, qualified at 190.446 mph, the second-fastest car in the field. Since he was a second day qualifier, however, he was forced to line up behind the first-day qualifiers. Al Unser, also shut out from the pole round, completed a solid run at 183.889 mph.

A long line of cars stretched down the pit lane for the final hour. Numerous cars had not yet had an opportunity to make their guaranteed qualifying attempt, and time was running out. Rumors were circulating up and down pit lane that USAC might extend qualifying beyond the original 6 p.m. deadline. With fifteen minutes left in the day, the field was finally filled to 33 cars. Johnny Parsons - who controversially got out for a second qualifying attempt before other cars had been able to make their first attempt - bumped Jigger Sirois out of the field with nine minutes left. The final car to make an attempt was rookie Jan Opperman, who qualified for the 32nd position, bumping Denny Zimmerman. Sammy Sessions and several others were left waiting in line at the 6 o'clock gun. USAC officials refused to extend time trials, claiming that the qualifying line had been "broken" by Parsons, and thus time trials was over.

A protest (and later a civil suit) was filed by owners representing nine cars that were not able to make an attempt. The controversy dragged on throughout the week, but it was ultimately dismissed.

== Starting grid ==
Row	Inside	Middle	Outside
1	(United States) 14-A. J. Foyt W	(United States) 40-Wally Dallenbach Sr.	(United States) 68-Mike Hiss
2	(United States) 20-Gordon Johncock W	(United States) 5-Mario Andretti W	(United States) 98-Mike Mosley
3	(United States) 48-Bobby Unser W	(United States) 24-Tom Sneva R	(United Kingdom) 73-David Hobbs
4	(United States) 44-Dick Simon	(United States) 8-Gary Bettenhausen	(United States) 21-Jimmy Caruthers
5	(United States) 82-George Snider	(United States) 77-Salt Walther	(United States) 60-Steve Krisiloff
6	(United States) 4-Bill Vukovich II	(United States) 55-Jerry Grant	(United States) 9-Lloyd Ruby
7	(United States) 42-Jerry Karl	(United States) 18-Bill Simpson R	(United States) 11-Pancho Carter R
8	(United States) 89-John Martin	(United States) 27-Tom Bigelow R	(United States) 61-Rick Muther
9	(United States) 3-Johnny Rutherford	(United States) 15-Al Unser W	(United States) 1-Roger McCluskey
10	(United States) 56-Jim Hurtubise	(United States) 94-Johnny Parsons R	(United States) 45-Jim McElreath
11	(United States) 79-Bob Harkey	(United States) 51-Jan Opperman R	(United States) 59-Larry Cannon R

=== Alternates ===
- First alternate: Denny Zimmerman (#31) — Bumped
- Second alternate: Jigger Sirois R (#25) — Bumped

=== Failed to Qualify ===
- John Mahler (#69, #74) — Wave off
- Al Loquasto R (#86) — Incomplete attempt
- Larry McCoy R (#63) — Incomplete attempt
- Bentley Warren (#26, #94) — Incomplete attempt
- John Cannon R (#53)
- Bruce Jacobi R (#53)
- Larry Rice R (#39)

=== Waiting in line (no attempt given) ===
- Sammy Sessions (#30)
- Bill Puterbaugh R (#38)
- Eldon Rasmussen R (#58)
- Mel Kenyon (#19)
- Lee Brayton R (#76)

== Race summary ==
=== Start ===
At the start, Wally Dallenbach blasted from the middle of the front row to take the lead into turn one. His aforementioned "king-sized" turbocharger was credited for the fast start, but its reliability was a source of considerable concern. Dallenbach set a new race record for one-lap of 191.408 mph on lap 2, as he pulled out to a sizable lead. The lead was short-lived, however, as Dallenbach broke a piston and coasted to a stop on lap 3. Attrition was very high early on, as eight cars dropped out with mechanical problems by lap 11. Mario Andretti and Gary Bettenhausen each broke a valve, and Mike Mosley blew an engine. Rick Muther pulled into the pits with problems during the pace lap, but rejoined the race, only to lose a piston after 11 laps.

A. J. Foyt took the lead when Dallenbach dropped out. Rutherford was charging dramatically from the 25th starting position. By lap 23, he was running third, and on lap 24, he passed Bobby Unser to take 2nd position.

=== First half ===
The top five consisted of Foyt, Rutherford, Bobby Unser, rookie Tom Sneva and Al Unser. By lap 45, Rutherford was driving very aggressively in traffic, and caught up to Foyt. The two cars ran nose-to-tail over the next several laps.

During the second sequence of pit stops around lap 50, teammates Gordon Johncock and Steve Krisiloff both ran out of fuel. They coasted back to the pits and lost considerable time on the track. Bobby Unser also ran out of fuel, and top of that, had a 39 second pit stop. On lap 62, the first caution came out when Larry Cannon stalled on the backstretch. Under the yellow, A. J. Foyt had a terrible pit stop of 53 seconds, which allowed Rutherford to take the lead for the first time on lap 65.

The green came out on lap 68, but only lasted three laps, as Jimmy Caruthers blew an engine, and dropped oil on the track. Five laps later, Pancho Carter lightly brushed the wall exiting turn four, but the car did not suffer significant damage.

On the next green flag pit stop around lap 90, Rutherford was on the receiving end of good luck. He ducked into the pits under green, but seconds later the caution came out for a spin by Jan Opperman, which allowed Rutherford to pit with little time lost.

=== Second half ===
Jerry Karl crashed in turn 3 after completing 115 laps. During the caution, Johnny Rutherford exited the pits right in front of second place A. J. Foyt, and held the lead. Seconds later, the green light came back on while the drivers were in the southchute. Foyt got the jump on the restart, and passed Rutherford for the lead in turn 2.

At lap 130, Foyt, Rutherford, and Bobby Unser were running 1st-2nd-3rd. Al Unser dropped out on lap 131 with a broken valve, bringing out the caution for a tow-in. Foyt ducked into the pits, and Rutherford was now the leader again.

On lap 138, the green light came back on. Foyt came through traffic and passed Rutherford for the lead down the mainstretch. A lap later though, Foyt's car began smoking, and he was issued the black flag due to leaking oil. After two pit stops, Foyt dropped out with a broken turbocharger scavenger pump.

Rutherford took over the lead on lap 141, and seemed to have the race in hand. Bobby Unser was the only other car on the lead lap, but was between 15 and 20 second behind. Rutherford had a close call in turn one while attempting to pass lap traffic. As he was lapping Pancho Carter and Jim McElreath, Carter spun right next to him in turn one. McElreath narrowly avoided him, and all three cars continued.

Rutherford gave up the lead only one more time on lap 176 during a pit stop. He led the final 24 laps to win his first Indianapolis 500. David Hobbs' 5th-place finish was the only top ten at Indianapolis for a foreign driver in the 1970s (except Andretti, who was born in Italy but was a naturalized U.S. citizen).

Immediately after the checkered flag was waved for Johnny Rutherford, a multitude of fans streamed onto the active track in turn three. This forced the race steward to immediately halt the race, rather than give the other drivers the allotted five minutes to complete the race distance as had been the custom since 1964 (before 1964, the time allowed was even longer). A similar fan incursion occurred in 1977 after A. J. Foyt won his fourth "500". This prompted the officials to change the rules in subsequent years to eliminate the "extra time." Once the winner crossed the finish line, the race ends, and all others on the track would be allowed only to finish the current lap they were running.

== Box score ==
Finish	Start	No	Name	Chassis	Engine	Tire	Qual	Laps	Time/Retired
1	25	3	(United States) Johnny Rutherford	McLaren	Offenhauser	G	190.446	200	158.589
2	7	48	(United States) Bobby Unser W	Eagle	Offenhauser	G	185.176	200	+22.32
3	16	4	(United States) Bill Vukovich II	Eagle	Offenhauser	G	182.500	199	Flagged (-1 lap)
4	4	20	(United States) Gordon Johncock W	Eagle	Offenhauser	G	186.287	198	Flagged (-2 laps)
5	9	73	(United Kingdom) David Hobbs	McLaren	Offenhauser	G	184.833	196	Flagged (-4 laps)
6	30	45	(United States) Jim McElreath	Eagle	Offenhauser	G	177.279	194	Flagged (-6 laps)
7	21	11	(United States) Pancho Carter R	Eagle	Offenhauser	F	180.605	191	Flagged (-9 laps)
8	31	79	(United States) Bob Harkey	Kenyon	Foyt V-8	F	176.687	189	Flagged (-11 laps)
9	18	9	(United States) Lloyd Ruby	Eagle	Offenhauser	F	181.699	187	Out of fuel
10	17	55	(United States) Jerry Grant	Eagle	Offenhauser	F	181.781	175	Flagged (-25 laps)
11	22	89	(United States) John Martin	McLaren	Offenhauser	G	180.406	169	Flagged (-31 laps)
12	23	27	(United States) Tom Bigelow R	Vollstedt	Offenhauser	F	180.144	166	Flagged (-34 laps)
13	20	18	(United States) Bill Simpson R	Eagle	Offenhauser	F	181.041	163	Piston
14	3	68	(United States) Mike Hiss	McLaren	Offenhauser	G	187.490	158	Flagged (-42 laps)
15	1	14	(United States) A. J. Foyt W	Coyote	Foyt V-8	G	191.632	142	Oil Fitting
16	27	1	(United States) Roger McCluskey	Riley	Offenhauser	F	181.004	141	Rear End
17	14	77	(United States) Salt Walther	McLaren	Offenhauser	G	183.927	141	Piston
18	26	15	(United States) Al Unser W	Eagle	Offenhauser	F	183.889	131	Valve
19	19	42	(United States) Jerry Karl	Eagle	Offenhauser	F	181.452	115	Crash T3
20	8	24	(United States) Tom Sneva R	Kingfish	Offenhauser	F	185.147	94	Drive Gear
21	32	51	(United States) Jan Opperman R	Parnelli	Offenhauser	F	176.186	85	Spun T4
22	15	60	(United States) Steve Krisiloff	Eagle	Offenhauser	G	182.519	72	Clutch
23	12	21	(United States) Jimmy Caruthers	Eagle	Offenhauser	F	184.049	64	Gearbox
24	33	59	(United States) Larry Cannon R	Eagle	Offenhauser	F	173.963	49	Differential
25	28	56	(United States) Jim Hurtubise	Eagle	Offenhauser	F	180.288	31	Blown Engine
26	29	94	(United States) Johnny Parsons R	Finley	Offenhauser	F	180.252	18	Turbocharger
27	24	61	(United States) Rick Muther	Coyote	Foyt V-8	G	179.991	11	Piston
28	13	82	(United States) George Snider	Atlanta	Foyt V-8	G	183.993	7	Valve
29	6	98	(United States) Mike Mosley	Eagle	Offenhauser	F	185.319	6	Blown Engine
30	2	40	(United States) Wally Dallenbach Sr.	Eagle	Offenhauser	G	189.683	3	Piston
31	5	5	(United States) Mario Andretti W	Eagle	Offenhauser	F	186.027	2	Valve
32	11	8	(United States) Gary Bettenhausen	McLaren	Offenhauser	G	184.493	2	Valve
33	10	44	(United States) Dick Simon	Eagle	Foyt V-8	G	184.502	1	Valve

W Former Indianapolis 500 winner

R Indianapolis 500 Rookie

=== Race statistics ===
Lap Leaders
Laps	Leader
1–2	Wally Dallenbach
3–24	A. J. Foyt
25–26	Bobby Unser
27–49	A. J. Foyt
50–52	Bobby Unser
53–64	A. J. Foyt
65–125	Johnny Rutherford
126–135	A. J. Foyt
136–137	Johnny Rutherford
138–140	A. J. Foyt
141–175	Johnny Rutherford
176	Bobby Unser
177–200	Johnny Rutherford

Total laps led
Driver	Laps
Johnny Rutherford	122
A. J. Foyt	70
Bobby Unser	6
Wally Dallenbach	2

PACER Yellow Light Periods
7 for 34 minutes, 21 seconds
Laps*	Reason
62–63	Larry Cannon stalled on backstretch (3:20)
68–70	Jimmy Caruthers blown engine (5:30)
76–77	Pancho Carter brushed wall in turn 4 (3:20)
90–91	Jan Opperman spun in north chute (3:53)
121–126	Jerry Karl crashed in turn 3 (10:00)
134–137	Al Unser stalled in turn 2 (5:18)
155–155	Pancho Carter spun in turn 1 (3:00)
* – Approximate lap counts

Tire participation chart
Supplier	No. of starters
Goodyear	16*
Firestone	17
* – Denotes race winner

== Broadcasting ==
=== Radio ===
The race was carried live on the IMS Radio Network. The broadcast reached an estimated 1,200 affiliates and carriers. Sid Collins served as chief announcer and Fred Agabashian served as "driver expert." At the conclusion of the race, Lou Palmer reported from victory lane. The broadcast opened with a 45-minute prerace.

Several shuffles occurred amongst the reporters and locations, the most significant changes in almost a decade. Mike Ahern retired from the crew and his prestigious turn one location. Veteran Ron Carrell moved from turn three to take over turn one. Among the newcomers was Paul Page, who debuted as a pit reporter. The reporting location for turn three was moved to a platform on the "L" grandstand. Doug Zink took over turn three, and rookie Jerry Baker made his 500 radio debut on the backstretch.

For the first time, there were five pit/garage reporters on the crew. For the 1974 race, the length of the pit road was increased, and the additional reporter was added to help cover the expansion. Bob Forbes was once again the "wireless" roving reporter.

Indianapolis Motor Speedway Radio Network
Booth Announcers	Turn Reporters	Pit/garage reporters
Chief Announcer: Sid Collins; Driver expert: Fred Agabashian; Statistician: John DeCamp; Historian: Donald Davidson	Turn 1: Ron Carrell; Turn 2: Howdy Bell; Backstretch: Jerry Baker R Turn 3: Doug Zink; Turn 4: Jim Shelton	Paul Page R (north pits); Chuck Marlowe (north-center pits); Luke Walton (south-center pits); Lou Palmer (south pits); Bob Forbes (garages/hospital)

=== Television ===
The race was carried in the United States on ABC Sports on a same-day tape delay basis. Jim McKay returned as announcer, but Jackie Stewart was in Monaco for coverage of the grand prix but Stewart recorded features during the qualifying weekends before he went to Monaco and the features were aired on race day before sending a report from Monaco of the race. Former driver Sam Posey joined the crew as booth analyst.

The broadcast has re-aired on ESPN Classic since May 2011.

Since April 25, 2019 the full race broadcast was made available on the official Indianapolis Motor Speedway YouTube channel.

ABC Television
Booth Announcers	Pit/garage reporters
Host: Chris Schenkel; Announcer: Jim McKay; Color: Sam Posey	Chris Economaki; Bill Flemming; Jackie Stewart (Features)

== Notes ==
=== See also ===
- 1974 USAC Championship Car season

=== Works cited ===
- 1974 Indianapolis 500 Press Information – Daily Trackside Summary
- Indianapolis 500 History: Race & All-Time Stats – Official Site
- 1974 Indianapolis 500 Radio Broadcast, Indianapolis Motor Speedway Radio Network

1973 Indianapolis 500; Gordon Johncock	1974 Indianapolis 500; Johnny Rutherford	1975 Indianapolis 500; Bobby Unser
