= Sammy Sessions =

American racing driver

- Nationality: (United States) American
- Born: Allen Dale Sessions; 10 September 1935 Nashville, Michigan, United States
- Died: 17 December 1977 (aged 42) Alexandria, Minnesota, United States

Allen Dale "Sammy" Sessions (September 10, 1935 – December 17, 1977) was an American race car driver. In 1972, he finished 4th in the Indianapolis 500 and won the USAC division title.

== Early life ==
Sessions was born in Nashville, Michigan.

== Career ==
Sessions drove in the USAC Championship Car series, racing in the 1965-1975 seasons with 62 starts, including the Indianapolis 500 in 1968-1973 and 1975. He finished in the top-ten 21 times, with his best finish in fourth position on seven occasions.

Based on information in "Donald Davidson's Indianapolis 500 Mile Race Annual 1974," Sessions was not given a chance to qualify for the 1974 Indy 500. Because of the "fuel crisis," Qualifications were cut to two days in 1974. May 11 was a short day of qualifying due to weather; on May 18 qualifications began about 15 minutes late due to administrative delays. Sessions was at the line with engine running on May 18 when 6PM arrived. There were thirty-three cars in the field, but not everyone who entered in 1974 had a chance to qualify.

Sessions was also the 1972 USAC Sprint Car Series Champion.

== Death and legacy ==
Sessions died in a snowmobile racing accident on the big half-mile oval in Alexandria, Minnesota. He was posthumously inducted into the Michigan Motorsports Hall of Fame in 1982.

== Indianapolis 500 results ==
Year	Chassis	Engine	Start	Finish
1966	Ward	Offy	Failed to Qualify	
1967	Horton	Ford	Failed to Qualify	
1968	Finley	Offy	31st	9th
1969	Finley	Offy	23rd	12th
1970	Vollstedt	Ford	32nd	12th
1971	Lola	Ford	25th	27th
1972	Lola	Foyt	24th	4th
1973	Eagle	Foyt	32nd	28th
1974	Eagle	Chevrolet	Failed to Qualify	
1975	Eagle	Offy	25th	17th
