= John Mahler =

American race car driver (1936–2024)

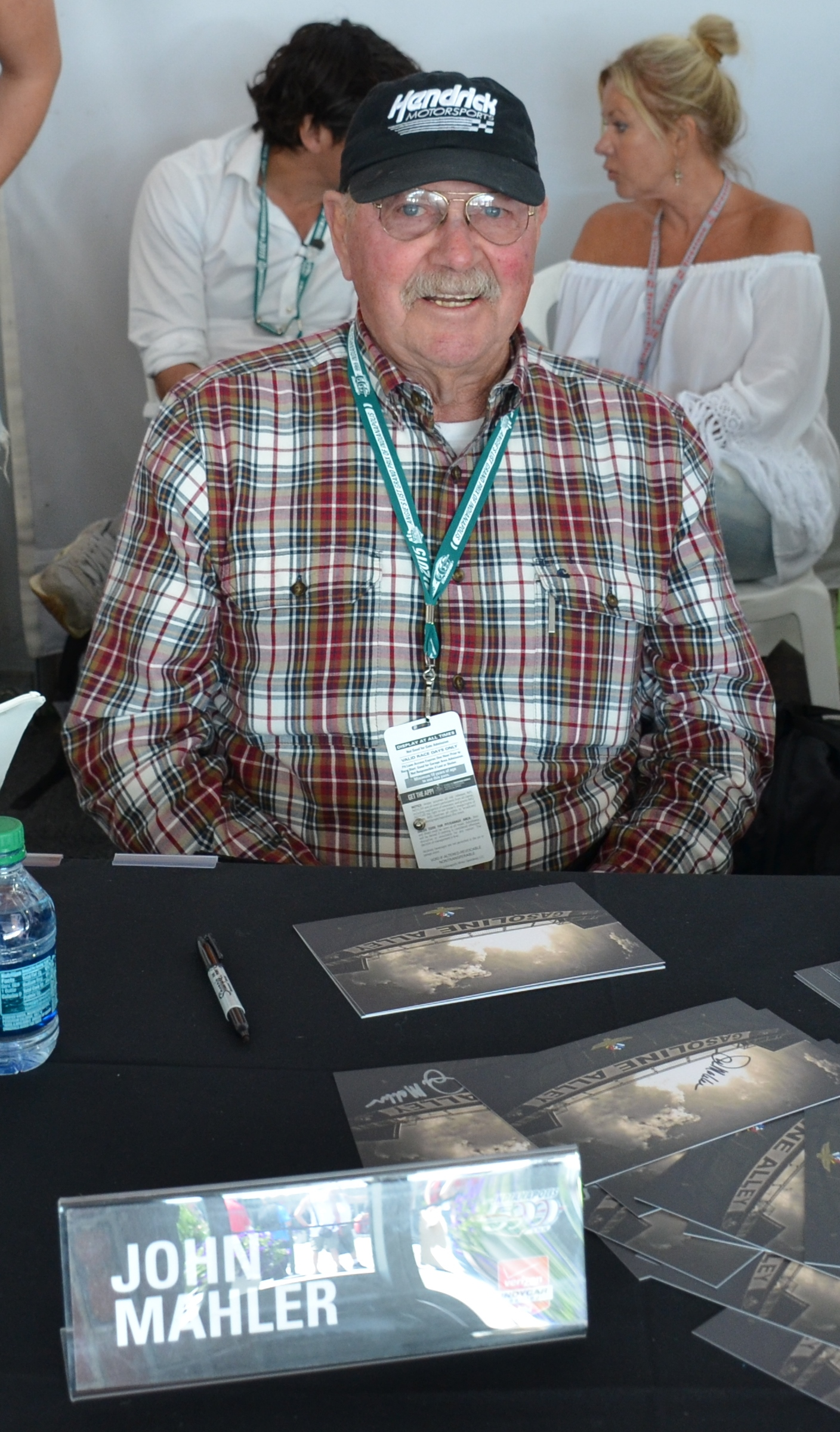
John Mahler at the 2015 Indianapolis 500

John William Mahler (November 16, 1936 – February 6, 2024) was an American open wheel race car driver in the USAC and CART Championship Car series.

== Biography ==
John William Mahler was born in Alpha, Iowa, on November 16, 1936. He raced in the 1970–1973 and 1976–1981 seasons, with 39 combined career starts, including the 1972 and 1977–1979 Indianapolis 500. Mahler finished in the top-ten six times, with his best finish in sixth position in 1970 at the Indianapolis Raceway Park road course.

Mahler qualified for the 1971 Indianapolis 500 but was replaced by his teammate who did not qualify, Dick Simon, due to sponsorship commitments. Mahler was presented with the American Auto Racing Writers and Broadcasters Association Jigger Award for the driver with the most hard luck. He was a member of the 1977 and 1979 Last Row Party for earning a position in the 11th and final row of the starting grid.

Mahler latterly owned and operated Classic Concrete Designs in Kansas City, Missouri. He died from cancer on February 6, 2024, at the age of 87.

== Complete motorsports results ==
=== American Open-Wheel racing results ===
(key) (Races in bold indicate pole position, races in italics indicate fastest race lap)

==== SCCA National Championship Runoffs ====
Year	Track	Car	Engine	Class	Finish	Start	Status
1969	Daytona	McLaren	Chevrolet	Formula A	11	7	Not running

==== Indianapolis 500 results ====
Year	Chassis	Engine	Start	Finish
1971	Vollstedt	Ford	Raced by Dick Simon	
1972	McLaren	Offy	29th	22nd
1973	Eagle	Offy	Failed to Qualify	
1974	Eagle	Offy	Failed to Qualify	
1976	Eagle	Offy	Failed to Qualify	
1977	Eagle	Offy	31st	14th
1978	Eagle	Offy	17th	26th
1979	Eagle	Offy	32nd	25th
1980	Finley	Offy	Failed to Qualify	
1981	Penske	Offy	Failed to Qualify	
1982	Penske	Offy	Qualifying Crash	
1983	Lion	Chevrolet	Failed to Qualify	
