= 1971 Indianapolis 500 =

American motor race

55th Indianapolis 500
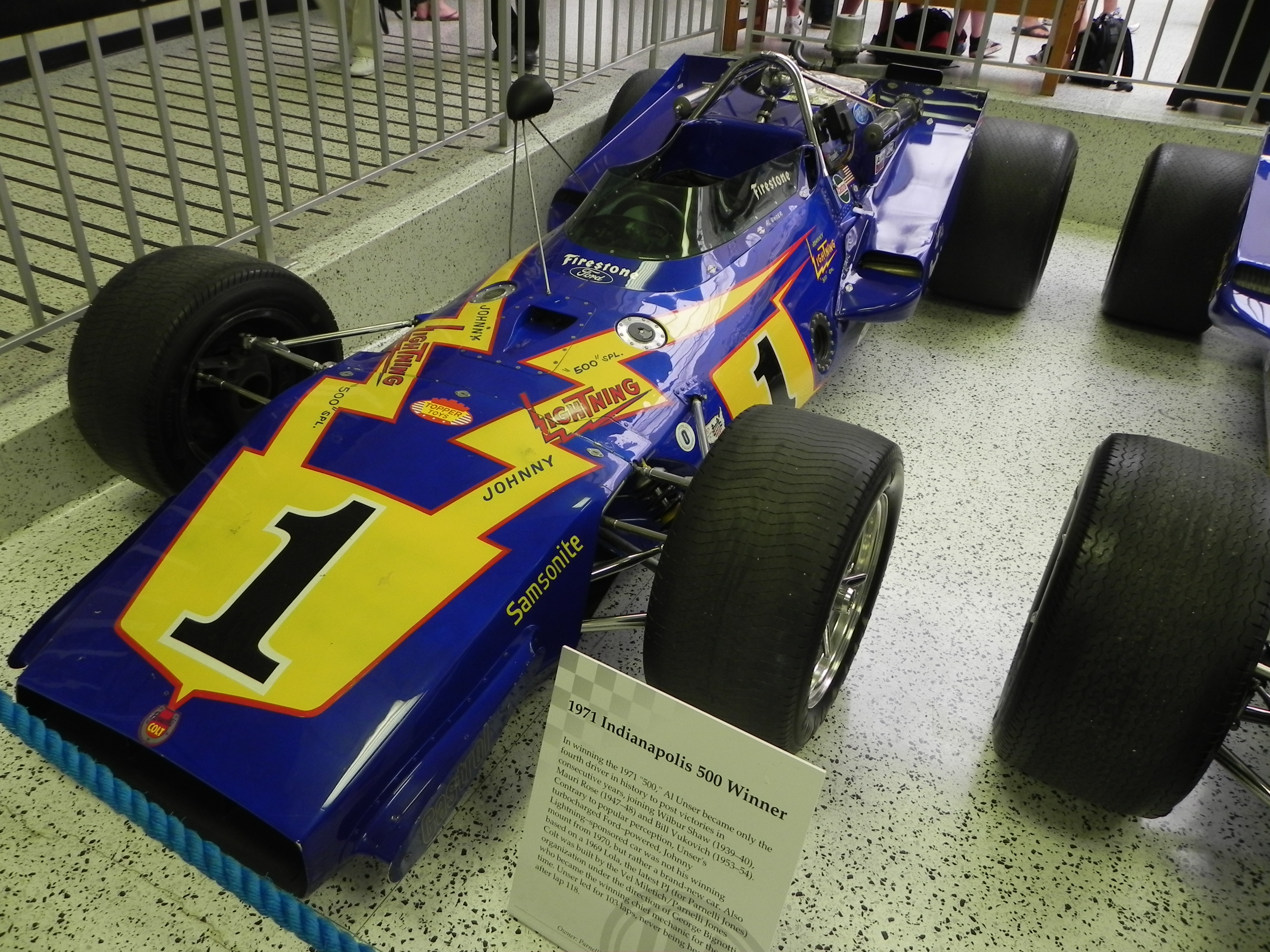

Indianapolis Motor Speedway

Indianapolis 500
- Sanctioning body: USAC
- Season: 1971 USAC Trail
- Date: May 29, 1971
- Winner: Al Unser, Sr.
- Winning team: Vel's Parnelli Jones Racing
- Winning Chief Mechanic: George Bignotti
- Time of race: 3:10:11.56
- Average speed: 157.735 mph (253.850 km/h)
- Pole position: Peter Revson
- Pole speed: 178.696 mph (287.583 km/h)
- Fastest qualifier: Peter Revson
- Rookie of the Year: Denny Zimmerman
- Most laps led: Al Unser, Sr. (103)

Pre-race ceremonies
- National anthem: Purdue Band
- "Back Home Again in Indiana": Peter DePaolo
- Starting command: Tony Hulman
- Pace car: Dodge Challenger
- Pace car driver: Eldon Palmer
- Starter: Pat Vidan
- Estimated attendance: 261,000

Television in the United States
- Network: ABC
- Announcers: Jim McKay, Jackie Stewart

Chronology
Previous	Next
1970	1972

The 55th 500 Mile International Sweepstakes was a motor race held at the Indianapolis Motor Speedway in Speedway, Indiana on Saturday, May 29, 1971. Al Unser Sr. won for the second consecutive year, dominating most of the race. Unser became the fourth driver to win the Indy 500 in back-to-back years, and it was his second of a record-tying four Indy victories.

The race was marred by a crash involving the pace car at the start. Eldon Palmer, a local Indianapolis-area Dodge dealer, lost control of the Dodge Challenger pace car at the south end of the pit area, and it crashed into a photographers' stand, injuring 29 people, two seriously.

Peter Revson started on the pole with a record speed of 178.696 miles per hour (287.6 km/h), more than a mile per hour faster than any other qualifier, with defending Indy 500 winner and USAC National Champion Al Unser in the middle of the second row. Mark Donohue, who qualified in the middle of the front row, took the lead at the start of the race and led the first 50 laps. A mechanical issue ended his day, however, on lap 66, at which time Unser assumed the lead. He and Joe Leonard swapped the lead several times during the middle portion of the race, but Unser led for the final 83 laps, giving him a win for the second year in a row. He was the first to successfully defend his title since Bill Vukovich won in 1953–1954.

Unser became the first and only driver to-date to win the race on his birthday (32nd); which was also coincidentally the first time the race had ever been held on May 29, and he also became the first winner to celebrate in the new victory lane. The new winner's area, now featuring black and white checkered ramps, was moved from the south end of the pits to the "horseshoe" area immediately below the Master Control Tower, near the start/finish line.

The 1971 Indy 500 was part of the newly re-organized USAC Marlboro Championship Trail, in which dirt tracks were separated from the paved ovals and road courses. From then on, the Gold Crown championship schedule would consist solely of paved tracks (both ovals and road courses), giving the national championship a decidedly new look for the 1970s and beyond. In addition, with 500-mile races at Ontario and Pocono now on the schedule, Indy car racing formed its first "triple crown."

The city of Indianapolis celebrated its Sesquicentennial in 1971, and the occasion was reflected on the bronze and silver pit badges for the month of May. During the week leading up to the race, Indianapolis was also the site of 1971 NATO International Conference of Cities.

== Race schedule ==
In the days leading up to the race, Speedway officials announced that female reporters would be allowed in the pit area and garage area for the first time.

For this race, and again in 1972, the race was scheduled for the Saturday of Memorial Day weekend. The Uniform Monday Holiday Act had taken effect in 1971, and the Speedway moved the race off of its original traditional fixed date of May 30. Through 1970, Memorial Day was a fixed date holiday observed on May 30 regardless of the day of the week. From 1911 to 1970, the race was scheduled for May 30, regardless of the day of the week, unless May 30 fell on a Sunday. In those cases, the race would be scheduled for Monday May 31. In 1973, it was scheduled for Monday (but rain delayed it until Wednesday), and from 1974 onward, it was scheduled for the Sunday of Memorial Day weekend.

For 1971, the traditional Carburetion Day practice, held on Wednesday May 26, was officially open to the public for the first time.

Race schedule — May, 1971
Sun	Mon	Tue	Wed	Thu	Fri	Sat
						1 Practice
2 Practice	3 Practice	4 Practice	5 Practice	6 Practice	7 Practice	8 Practice
9 Practice	10; Practice	11; Practice	12; Practice	13; Practice	14; Practice	15; Pole Day
16; Time Trials	17; Practice	18; Practice	19; Practice	20; Practice	21; Practice	22; Time Trials
23; Bump Day	24	25	26; Carb Day	27	28; Parade	29; Indy 500
30	31; Memorial Day					

Color	Notes
Green	Practice
Dark Blue	Time trials
Silver	Race day
Red	Rained out*
Blank	No track activity

* Includes days where track
activity was significantly
limited due to rain

== Time trials ==
For the first time, USAC firmed up the rules regarding pole day qualifying. As had been done in previous years, a blind draw would be held to determine the order of qualifying on pole day. However, starting in 1971, all drivers/cars in the original qualifying draw order would be allowed the opportunity to make at least one attempt in the pole round regardless if rain halted the session and pushed it off to another day. Previously, if rain interrupted the qualifying line on pole day, any cars left in the original qualifying order at the time the track closed because of weather or the track closing at 6:00 p.m. were deemed to qualify on the next round.

During practice, McLaren arrived at the track with the new M16 chassis, drawing attention and some controversy due to presence of a large rear wing affixed to the engine cover. USAC rules through 1971 required that any aerodynamic devices were to be an integral part of the bodywork. After inspection, officials ultimately approved the device, as McLaren argued it was part of the engine cover. The engine cover was not much more than a flat, plate-like shape that ran along the top of the engine, with the wing affixed to the rear. As practice began, the McLaren entries quickly established themselves as favorites for the pole position.

=== Pole Day - Saturday May 15 ===
McLaren M16 cars dominated qualifying during a record-shattering afternoon. The chassis took 1st, 2nd, and 4th starting positions, but the results were not without some surprise. Mark Donohue in the Penske-owned McLaren had broken the 180 mph barrier during practice on Thursday, establishing himself as the favorite for the pole. Donohue lucked out with an early draw on Pole Day, going out third in line. He posted a four-lap average of 177.087 mph to sit on the provisional pole. It was a new track record, but a little disappointing compared to the 180 mph lap he had two days earlier.

Later in the day, Peter Revson, driving a works McLaren, bumped Donohue from the pole with a four-lap average of 178.696 mph. This made the pole position far out of reach for the rest of the field. Donohue reportedly suffered handling problems with his car during his run, purportedly as a result of his crew refusing to dial it in as he requested. Donohue then confided with his friend Revson, who then clandestinely borrowed Donohue's chassis set-up advice to knock him off the pole. Bobby Unser in an Eagle chassis, squeezed between the three McLaren cars by qualifying third.

=== Second Day - Sunday May 16 ===
Three drivers completed runs, with Bud Tingelstad (170.156 mph) the fastest of the afternoon. Mike Mosley returned after two crashes the previous day, and qualified solidly over 169 mph.

=== Third Day - Saturday May 22 ===
A busy day saw the field filled to 33 cars car. The day concluded with Steve Krisiloff bumping out rookie Sam Posey.

=== Bump Day - Sunday May 23 ===
Strong winds kept speeds down, and only three drivers successfully bumped their way into the field. The windy conditions led to six crashes, and hopefuls waited until the final 45 minutes before they took to the track. The session started out with Mel Kenyon bumping out Carl Williams. Bob Harkey bumped Dick Simon, and Art Pollard got back into the field by bumping Jim McElreath.

Jim Hurtubise once again tried to qualify his front-engined roadster, but on his second lap, hit the outside wall at the head of the main stretch. His first two laps would not have been fast enough to bump his way in. The day ended as Dick Simon (waved off) and Jerry Grant (waved off) made unsuccessful attempts.

After qualifying, car owner Dick Simon announced he was going to take over the machine qualified by John Mahler. By rule, the car must move to the rear of the grid (33rd) on race day.

== Starting grid ==
Row	Inside		Middle		Outside	
1	86	(United States) Peter Revson	66	(United States) Mark Donohue	2	(United States) Bobby Unser W
2	85	(New Zealand) Denny Hulme	1	(United States) Al Unser W	9	(United States) A. J. Foyt W
3	12	(United States) Lloyd Ruby	15	(United States) Joe Leonard	5	(United States) Mario Andretti W
4	42	(United States) Jim Malloy	32	(United States) Bill Vukovich II	7	(United States) Gordon Johncock
5	16	(United States) Gary Bettenhausen	21	(United States) Cale Yarborough	95	(United States) Bentley Warren R
6	68	(United Kingdom) David Hobbs R	58	(United States) Bud Tingelstad	38	(United States) Rick Muther
7	4	(United States) Mike Mosley	84	(United States) Donnie Allison	80	(United States) George Snider
8	6	(United States) Roger McCluskey	22	(United States) Wally Dallenbach Sr.	18	(United States) Johnny Rutherford
9	98	(United States) Sammy Sessions	45	(United States) Larry Dickson	20	(United States) Steve Krisiloff R
10	43	(United States) Denny Zimmerman R	41	(United States) George Follmer	23	(United States) Mel Kenyon
11	64	(United States) Art Pollard	99	(United States) Bob Harkey	44	(United States) Dick Simon

John Mahler qualified 27th. A few days before the race, Dick Simon took over the machine, and the car was moved the rear of the field.

R Indianapolis 500 rookie
W Indianapolis 500 winner

=== Alternates ===
- First alternate: Jim McElreath (#14, #46)

=== Failed to Qualify ===
- Tony Adamowicz R (#17)
- Ronnie Bucknum (#17, #97)
- Larry Cannon R (#47)
- Jimmy Caruthers R (#64)
- Jerry Grant (#17, #78, #92)
- Jim Hurtubise (#56)
- Bruce Jacobi R (#71)
- Bobby Johns (#97)
- Dee Jones R (#51)
- Jerry Karl R (#71)
- Arnie Knepper (#19, #29, #30, #65)
- Al Loquasto R (#26, #31)
- John Mahler R (#44) - Replaced by Dick Simon
- John Martin R (#69)
- Sam Posey R (#78)
- Bill Puterbaugh R (#30)
- Les Scott R (#50)
- Bill Simpson R (#28)
- Jigger Sirois R (#65)
- Dave Strickland R (#50)
- Bruce Walkup (#94, #97, #98)
- Salt Walther R (#77) - Failed rookie test
- Greg Weld (#31, #35)
- Carl Williams (#77)
- LeeRoy Yarbrough (#42, #48)

== Pace car crash ==
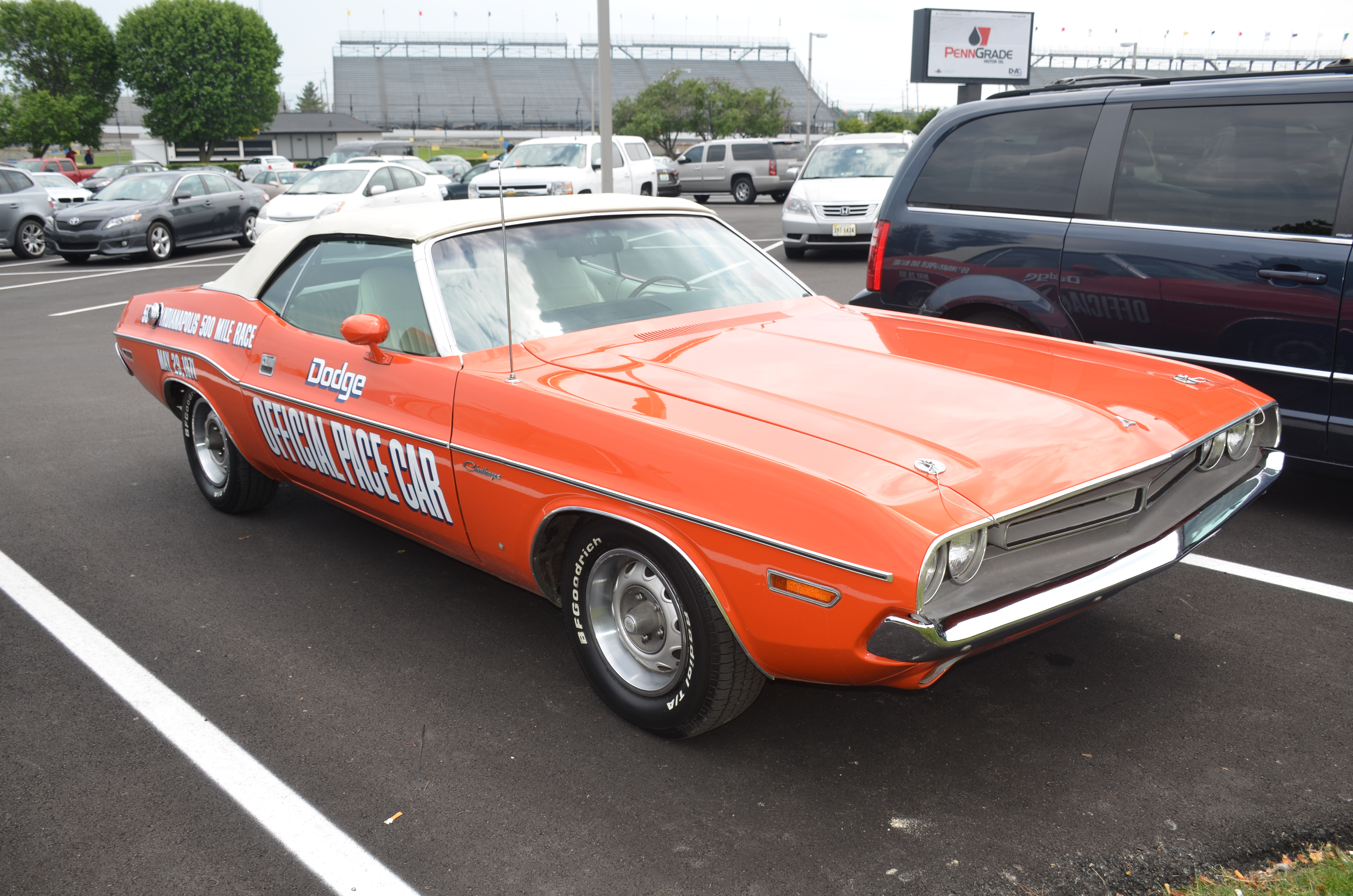
The repaired 1971 Dodge Challenger pace car.

For 1971, none of the Big Three auto manufacturers chose to supply a pace car for the Indianapolis 500, as the muscle car market had dried up and marketing efforts were shifted elsewhere. Four local Indianapolis-area Dodge dealers, spearheaded by Eldon Palmer, stepped up to supply the fleet of pace cars. The vehicle chosen was the Dodge Challenger 383-4V. Palmer was chosen to drive the pace car at the start of the race.

In preparation for the race, Palmer or an aide supposedly set up an orange flag (sometimes reported as an orange traffic cone) in the pit lane to provide himself with a braking reference point. However, there has been some dispute regarding the existence of the marker at all. One account claimed it had not been there for several days. During the parade and pace lap, Tony Hulman, ABC broadcaster Chris Schenkel, and John Glenn served as passengers in the car. Palmer practiced the run the day before the race.

As the field came down the main stretch for the start, Palmer pulled into the pits and accelerated down the pit lane. Palmer continued to accelerate, under the impression that he was required to cross the start/finish line in the pit area prior to, or at the same time, as the race cars doing so out on the track. His reference flag (or cone) had been removed and he missed his planned braking spot. Moving upwards of perhaps 125 miles per hour (201 km/h), Palmer realized he was going too fast, and rather than perilously veering back on to the racing surface, he braked heavily and lost control. Palmer had refused to blame the car, stating afterwards that "the equipment was good, disc brakes. I just didn't have enough track to stop." However, testimony during a 1974 civil trial stated that the pace car was supposed to be ordered with power disc brakes, but was built and delivered to the track with only manual drum brakes. Furthermore, Palmer's attorney added that a security guard running out of the way effectively blocked the exit to the pits.

The car swerved and skidded to the end of the pit lane, and crashed into a photographers' stand. The stand toppled and collapsed, injuring 29 people, but no one was killed. Dr. Vicente Alvarez, a freelance photographer from Argentina, was one of two on the stand who were seriously injured. Alvarez survived, and died in the late 1990s. Tony Hulman suffered a sprained ankle, and a shaken Schenkel sat out the remainder of the ABC broadcast.

Palmer maintained possession of the car, and eventually it was repaired and restored. Ultimately, Palmer himself was largely exonerated. Indiana businessman Steven Cage purchased the vehicle in 2006, and it currently is displayed at his RPM Collection in Fishers, Indiana. Reactions of the accident were very critical afterwards, and for the next several years, the pace car drivers selected were either former Indy drivers or people with racing experience.

== Race details ==
=== First half ===
Despite the pace car crash near the exit of the pits, the green light came on, and the race continued underway. Mark Donohue grabbed the lead from the middle of the front row.

On lap 12, Steve Krisiloff blew his engine, spilling oil in turn three. Mel Kenyon slid in the oil making contact with the turn three wall. Gordon Johncock and Mario Andretti continued to race each other through three yellow lights. When they arrived at turn three, track workers were on the scene beside the Kenyon machine. Having not heeded the yellow lights, both Johncock and Andretti slid in the oil with Johncock crashing into the Kenyon car, running over the top of it and destroying both cars. Kenyon, fortunately, had seen Johncock coming and dropped back down into the cockpit of his race car. Johncock's car left a tire mark on the top of Kenyon's helmet. The only injury received by Kenyon was a small cut on his shin from the dash board being pushed down onto his legs. All four cars were out of the race, and the yellow light was on for 19 minutes to clean up the accident.

Donohue led the first 50 laps, then the lead traded hands during pit stops between Joe Leonard, Bobby Unser, as well as Al Unser. After leading a total of 52 laps, Mark Donohue dropped out on lap 66 with broken gears. He came to a stop in turn four, and parked the car in the infield, just north of the entrance to the pits.

Lloyd Ruby led at the halfway point.

=== Second half ===
On lap 111, David Hobbs blew his engine on the main stretch. Rick Muther spun in the oil, his car veered to the inside wall, then bounced across the track, hitting Hobbs, and lifting up on two wheels. Hobbs' car was pushed head-on into the wall, but he was not seriously injured. Both cars slid down the main stretch, and came to a rest just beyond the start/finish line. The track was blocked except for a narrow portion on the inside where other cars were able to skirt by. The incident happened right in front of Al Unser, who was the leading the race at the moment. The yellow light came on for 12 minutes to clean up the crash.

After a series of pit stops by the leaders under the yellow, the green eventually came back out with Al Unser leading.

With less than 40 laps to go, Al Unser continued to lead, with Peter Revson second, Bobby Unser third, and A. J. Foyt fourth.

On lap 167, Mike Mosley lost a wheel in turn 4. He smacked the outside wall in turn four hard, then bounced across the track and hit the inside wall. Leader Al Unser was ahead of the crash, and second place Peter Revson just slipped by. Third place Bobby Unser spun to avoid Mosley, and hit the outside wall. Mosley's car then crashed into the parked cars of Mark Donohue and Steve Krisiloff, that were sitting near the entrance to the pits. A fire broke out, at which time 8th running Gary Bettenhausen stopped his car, and ran to the scene to help. Fire crews quickly doused the flames, and Mosley suffered a broken leg. Bill Vukovich II also spun to avoid the crash, but he was able to continue. The yellow remained on for 22 minutes to clean up the crash.

The green light came back on with less than 20 laps to go. Al Unser held a comfortable lead, and won his second 500 in a row. Despite four yellows for 53 minutes (about 48 laps), the average speed of 157.735 mph was a new record at the time. Bettenhausen, who finished 10th, was given a cheer at the finish for stopping to help Mosley and Unser on lap 164.

== Box score ==
Finish	Start	No	Name	Chassis	Engine	Tires	Qual	Laps	Status
1	5	1	(United States) Al Unser W	Colt	Ford V-8	F	174.621	200	157.735 mph
2	1	86	(United States) Peter Revson	McLaren M16	Offenhauser	G	178.695	200	+22.91
3	6	9	(United States) A. J. Foyt W	Coyote	Ford V-8	G	174.317	200	+2:01.82
4	10	42	(United States) Jim Malloy	Eagle	Offenhauser	G	171.838	200	+3:53.14
5	11	32	(United States) Bill Vukovich II	Brabham	Offenhauser	F	171.674	200	+3:54.19
6	20	84	(United States) Donnie Allison	Coyote	Ford V-8	G	171.903	199	Flagged (-1 lap)
7	17	58	(United States) Bud Tingelstad	Brabham	Offenhauser	F	170.156	198	Flagged (-2 laps)
8	28	43	(United States) Denny Zimmerman R	Vollstedt	Offenhauser	F	169.755	189	Flagged (-11 laps)
9	22	6	(United States) Roger McCluskey	Kuzma	Ford V-8	G	171.241	188	Flagged (-12 laps)
10	13	16	(United States) Gary Bettenhausen	Gerhardt	Offenhauser	G	171.233	178	Flagged (-22 laps)
11	7	12	(United States) Lloyd Ruby	Mongoose	Ford V-8	F	173.821	174	Gears
12	3	2	(United States) Bobby Unser W	Eagle	Offenhauser	G	175.816	164	Crash T4
13	19	4	(United States) Mike Mosley	Eagle Watson	Ford V-8	F	169.579	159	Crash T4
14	33	44	(United States) Dick Simon	Vollstedt	Ford V-8	F	170.165	151	Flagged (-23 laps)
15	29	41	(United States) George Follmer	Kingfish	Offenhauser	F	169.205	147	Piston
16	14	21	(United States) Cale Yarborough	Mongoose	Ford V-8	F	170.770	140	Cam Cover
17	4	85	(New Zealand) Denis Hulme	McLaren M16	Offenhauser	G	174.910	137	Valve
18	24	18	(United States) Johnny Rutherford	Eagle	Offenhauser	G	171.152	128	Flagged (-46 laps)
19	8	15	(United States) Joe Leonard	Colt	Ford V-8	F	172.761	123	Turbocharger
20	16	68	(United Kingdom) David Hobbs R	Lola	Ford V-8	G	169.571	107	Crash FS
21	18	38	(United States) Rick Muther	Brawner	Offenhauser	F	169.972	85	Crash FS
22	32	99	(United States) Bob Harkey	Gerhardt	Offenhauser	F	169.197	77	Gears
23	15	95	(United States) Bentley Warren R	Eagle	Offenhauser	F	169.627	76	Gears
24	23	22	(United States) Wally Dallenbach Sr.	Kuzma	Offenhauser	G	171.159	69	Valve
25	2	66	(United States) Mark Donohue	McLaren M16	Offenhauser	G	177.087	66	Gears
26	31	64	(United States) Art Pollard	Scorpion	Ford V-8	G	169.499	45	Valve
27	25	98	(United States) Sammy Sessions	Lola	Ford V-8	F	170.357	43	Valve
28	26	45	(United States) Larry Dickson	Kingfish	Offenhauser	F	170.285	33	Engine
29	12	7	(United States) Gordon Johncock	McLaren M15	Offenhauser	G	171.388	11	Crash T3
30	9	5	(United States) Mario Andretti W	McNamara	Ford V-8	F	172.612	11	Crash T3
31	27	20	(United States) Steve Krisiloff R	McNamara	Ford V-8	F	169.835	10	Oil Leak
32	30	23	(United States) Mel Kenyon	Kuzma	Ford V-8	G	170.205	10	Crash T3
33	21	80	(United States) George Snider	Eagle	Offenhauser	F	171.600	6	Stalled

W Former Indianapolis 500 winner

R Indianapolis 500 Rookie

=== Race statistics ===
Lap Leaders
Laps	Leader
1–50	Mark Donohue
51–52	Joe Leonard
53–64	Bobby Unser
65–66	Mark Donohue
67–72	Al Unser Sr.
73–82	Joe Leonard
83–87	Al Unser Sr.
88–94	Joe Leonard
95–98	Al Unser Sr.
99–101	Lloyd Ruby
102–110	Bobby Unser
111–115	Al Unser Sr.
116–117	Joe Leonard
118–200	Al Unser Sr.

Total laps led
Driver	Laps
Al Unser Sr.	103
Mark Donohue	52
Bobby Unser	21
Joe Leonard	21
Lloyd Ruby	3

Yellow Lights: 4 for 53 minutes (48 laps)
Laps*	Reason
4–5	Dennis Hulme spun in turn 4 (< 1 minute)
9–10	Rick Muther stalled in turn 4 (< 2 minutes)
12–28	Steve Krisloff blew engine in turn 3 Johncock, Andretti, Kenyon crashed (19 minutes)
113–120	David Hobbs, Rick Muther crash on frontstretch (12 minutes)
167–187	Mike Mosley, Bobby Unser crash in turn 4 (22 minutes)
* - Approximate lap counts

Tire participation chart
Supplier	No. of starters
Goodyear	15
Firestone	18*
* - Denotes race winner

== Qualifying chronology ==
Att #	Time	Car #	Driver	Laps	Qual Time	Qual Speed	Rank	Start	Comment
Saturday, May 15, 1971
1		4	Mike Mosley	0	—	—	—	—	accident
2		9	A. J. Foyt	4	3:26.52	174.317	6	6	
3		66	Mark Donohue	4	3:23.29	177.087	2	2	
4		32	Billy Vukovich II	4	3:29.70	171.674	12	11	
5		10	Dick Simon	4	3:33.14	168.903	—	—	Bumped by #99
6		14	Jim McElreath	3	—	—	—	—	Waved off
7		16	Gary Bettenhausen	4	3:30.24	171.233	16	13	
8		68	David Hobbs	4	3:32.30	169.571	30	16	
9		1	Al Unser	4	3:26.16	174.622	5	5	
10		7	Gordon Johncock	4	3:30.05	171.388	14	12	
11		42	Jim Malloy	4	3:29.50	171.838	11	10	
12		86	Peter Revson	4	3:21.46	178.696	1	1	
13		77	Carl Williams	1	—	—	—	—	Waved off
14		8	Art Pollard	3	—	—	—	—	Waved off
15		18	Johnny Rutherford	0	—	—	—	—	Blown engine
16		15	Joe Leonard	4	3:28.38	172.761	8	8	
17		2	Bobby Unser	4	3:24.76	175.816	3	3	
18		83	Donnie Allison	1	—	—	—	—	Waved off
19		28	Bill Simpson	4	3:33.94	168.271	—	—	Bumped by #45
20		12	Lloyd Ruby	4	3:27.11	173.821	7	7	
21		5	Mario Andretti	4	3:28.56	172.612	9	9	
22		85	Denis Hulme	0	—	—	—	—	Pulled off
23		45	Larry Dickson	3	—	—	—	—	Accident
24		14	Jim McElreath	3	—	—	—	—	Waved off
25		83	Donnie Allison	4	3:34.12	168.130	—	—	Withdrawn 5/22
26		85	Denis Hulme	4	3:25.82	174.910	4	4	
27		92	Jerry Grant	4	3:33.66	168.492	—	—	Bumped by #78
28		21	Cale Yarborough	4	3:30.81	170.770	19	14	
29		14	Jim McElreath	4	3:34.52	167.817	—	—	Bumped by #6; Reinstated by #83; Bumped by #84
30		38	Rick Muther	3	—	—	—	—	Blown engine
31		77	Carl Williams	4	3:33.29	168.784	—	—	Bumped by #23
32		8	Art Pollard	4	3:33.82	168.366	—	—	Bumped by #46
33		95	Bentley Warren	4	3:32.23	169.627	28	15	
Sunday May 16, 1971
34		4	Mike Mosley	0	3:32.29	169.579	29	19	
35		38	Rick Muther	0	3:31.80	169.972	25	18	
36		58	Bud Tingelstad	0	3:31.57	170.156	24	17	
Saturday May 22, 1971
37		80	George Snider	4	3:29.79	171.600	13	21	
38		43	Denny Zimmerman	4	3:32.07	169.755	27	28	
39		44	John Mahler	3	—	—	—	—	
40		98	Sam Sessions	4	3:31.32	170.358	20	25	
41		22	Wally Dallenbach	4	3:30.33	171.160	17	23	
42		94	Bruce Walkup	2	—	—	—	—	Waved off
43		45	Larry Dickson	3	—	—	—	—	Waved off
44		41	George Follmer	4	3:32.76	169.205	32	29	
45		44	John Mahler	4	3:31.56	170.164	23	33	Replaced by Dick Simon
46		18	Johnny Rutherford	4	3:30.34	171.151	18	24	
47		6	Roger McCluskey	2	—	—	—	—	Out of fuel
48		6	Roger McCluskey	4	3:30.23	171.241	15	22	Bumps #14
49		20	Steve Krisiloff	0	—	—	—	—	Pulled off
50		84	Donnie Allison	4	3:29.42	171.903	10	20	Bumps #14
51		45	Larry Dickson	4	3:31.41	170.285	21	26	Bumps #28
52		46	Jim McElreath	4	3:32.81	169.165	—	—	Bumps #8; Bumped by #64
53		94	Bruce Walkup	1	—	—	—	—	Pulled off
54		78	Sam Posey	4	3:33.30	168.776	—	—	Bumps #92; Bumped by #20
55		20	Steve Krisiloff	4	3:31.97	169.835	26	27	Bumps #78
Sunday May 23, 1971
56		23	Mel Kenyon	4	3:31.51	170.205	22	30	Bumps #77
57		99	Bob Harkey	4	3:32.77	169.197	33	32	Bumps #10
58		17	Jerry Grant	1	—	—	—	—	Waved off
59		64	Art Pollard	4	3:32.39	169.500	31	31	Bumps #46
60		56	Jim Hurtubise	2	—	—	—	—	Accident
61		33	Dick Simon	1	—	—	—	—	Waved off
62		17	Jerry Grant	1	—	—	—	—	Waved off

== Broadcasting ==
=== Radio ===
The race was carried live on the IMS Radio Network. It was carried on over 1,200 affiliates, including shortwave transmission to Europe, Asia, and Vietnam. The broadcast reached an estimated 100 million listeners worldwide. Sid Collins served as chief announcer and Len Sutton served as "driver expert." At the conclusion of the race, Lou Palmer reported from victory lane.

The entire on-air crew remained mostly consistent from 1966 to 1970. Bob Forbes joined the crew and was assigned a "wireless" microphone, covering the garages and roving reports. The pre-race coverage was 30 minutes long. In a departure from previous years, Sid Collins decided to eliminate booth interviews with celebrities during the race. The only exception was an interview with Hugh Downs, but that was during the post-race coverage. In addition, Luke Walton interviewed Evel Knievel in the pit area during the early stages of the race. Knievel was making his first visit to the 500, as a guest of the A. J. Foyt team.

Indianapolis Motor Speedway Radio Network
Booth Announcers	Turn Reporters	Pit/garage reporters
Chief Announcer: Sid Collins; Driver expert: Len Sutton; Statistician: John DeCamp; Historian: Donald Davidson	Turn 1: Mike Ahern; Turn 2: Howdy Bell; Backstretch: Doug Zink; Turn 3: Ron Carrell; Turn 4: Jim Shelton	Chuck Marlowe (north); Luke Walton (center); Lou Palmer (south); Bob Forbes (wireless) R

=== Television ===
For the first time, the race was carried in the United States the same day the race was held, on ABC Sports on a same-day tape delay basis. The race was held in the afternoon, and the broadcast aired in prime time later in the day.

The broadcast totaled two hours, and came on-air at 8:30 p.m. (eastern). Among the notable appearances, was David Letterman, at the time employed by then-ABC Indianapolis affiliate WLWI, who served as a roving turn reporter. Letterman interviewed Mario Andretti after he dropped out of the race.

Chris Schenkel began what would be a decade-long tenure as host, while Jim McKay anchored the broadcast as play-by-play announcer. But Schenkel's day as host was short. Riding in (and broadcasting from) the pace car at the start of the race, he was slightly injured when the pace car crashed after coming into the pits at the start of the race.

The broadcast was re-aired numerous times on ESPN Classic from February 2002 until the network's shutdown at the end of 2021.

ABC Television
Booth Announcers	Pit/garage reporters
Host: Chris Schenkel; Announcer: Jim McKay; Color: Jackie Stewart	Chris Economaki; Bill Flemming; Keith Jackson; David Letterman (turns)

== Notes ==
=== See also ===
- 1971 USAC Championship Car season

=== Works cited ===
- 1971 Indianapolis 500 Press Information - Daily Trackside Summary
- Indianapolis 500 History: Race & All-Time Stats - Official Site
- 1971 Indianapolis 500 Radio Broadcast, Indianapolis Motor Speedway Radio Network

1970 Indianapolis 500; Al Unser	1971 Indianapolis 500; Al Unser	1972 Indianapolis 500; Mark Donohue
Preceded by 156.867 mph (1969 Indianapolis 500)	Record for the fastest average speed 157.735 mph	Succeeded by 162.962 mph (1972 Indianapolis 500)
