= Leon Sirois =

American racing driver (1935–2026)

Leon Duray "Jigger" Sirois (April 16, 1935 – September 23, 2026) was an American racing driver from the small town of Shelby in northern Indiana. He raced in a variety of racing genres, most notably midget, stock and Indy "Big" cars. Sirois was the son of longtime veteran Indy 500 mechanic Earl "Frenchy" Sirois, who worked on the winning cars of Lee Wallard, Sam Hanks, and Jimmy Bryan during his 40-year career. He was named after driver Leon Duray. The nickname "Jigger" is in reference to family friend, two-time Indy-winning riding mechanic Jigger Johnson (1931, 1937), as well as a nickname given to him by his older sister.

== Racing career ==
=== Midget cars ===
Sirois won four championships in 1961 including UARA midget title. Some of his major victories include a 100-mile race at the Milwaukee Mile and a race at the Daytona Beach in a midget.

=== USAC Indy car ===
Though he never qualified for the Indianapolis 500, Sirois is most known in racing circles for circumstances surrounding his qualifying attempt in 1969. On Pole Day, Sirois drew first in line to qualify, and after a lengthy rain delay, took to the track late in the afternoon to make the first attempt of the day. He completed his first three laps at:

- Lap 1 – 161.783 mph
- Lap 2 – 162.279 mph
- Lap 3 – 160.542 mph

However, on his fourth and final lap, his crew waved off the run with the yellow flag, and it was negated. The crew felt the speed was inadequate to the make the field, and presumably intended to make another attempt later on. Moments later, Arnie Knepper went out to qualify, but rain began to fall during his warm up laps, and washed out the remainder of the weekend. It was quickly noticed by media and fans that had the crew not waved off his final lap on Saturday, Sirois would have been the lone qualifier of the weekend and sat on the coveted provisional pole position for an entire week—and likely would have started on the pole for race day. During the second weekend of time trials, Jigger Sirois waved off his second attempt, and also waved off his third and final attempt when his speed was not fast enough. As it ended up, Sirois's first attempt would have been fast enough to qualify for the race. The qualification rules were changed in 1971 to guarantee all cars in line on the first day of qualifying at least one chance to qualify during the pole position round. After 1969, Jigger came back to attempt to make the field every year up until 1975, failing to make the field every time. Most notably, was his fruitless attempt to qualify the uncompetitive Jack Adams Turbine, in 1970, which would prove be the final attempt to qualify a turbine-powered car for the Indianapolis 500.

Outside of the Indy 500, Sirois made ten other starts in USAC Championship Car racing. His best finish was 5th place at Phoenix in 1969.

== Personal life and death ==
Sirois graduated from Lowell High School and did various jobs in between races such as truck driver and construction worker. Sirois was married to Juanita.

He started stuttering after a tornado scare when he was three years old while living near Shelby, Indiana. He was able to learn to manage his stutter with professional help when he was 65. He lent his time to promote the awareness and treatment of stuttering disorders in youth.

In his later years, Sirois lived in Williamsburg, Virginia. Sirois died on September 23, 2026, at the age of 91.

== Awards ==
Sirois was named to the National Midget Auto Racing Hall of Fame in 2013.

== Indianapolis 500 results ==
Year	Chassis	Engine	Start	Finish
1969	Gerhardt	Offy	Failed to Qualify	
1970	Jack Adams Turbine	Pratt & Whitney Turbine	Failed to Qualify	
1971	?	Offy	Failed to Qualify	
1972	Navarro	AMC	Failed to Qualify	
1973	?	Dodge	Failed to Qualify	
1974	Cicada	Offy	Failed to Qualify	
1975	Eagle	Offy	Failed to Qualify	

== The Jigger Award ==
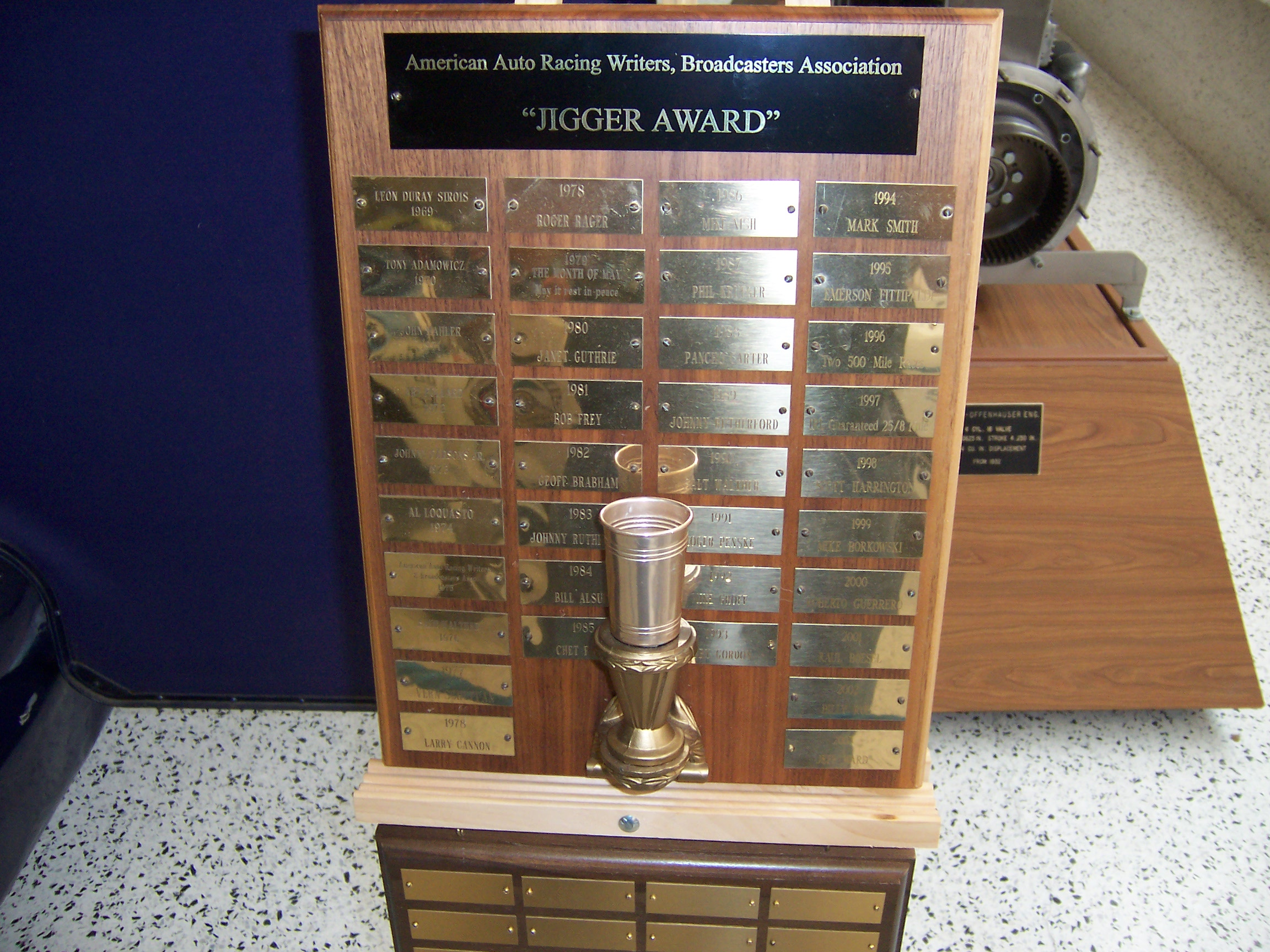
The "Jigger Award" trophy

In reflection of Sirois' infamous 1969 hard-luck qualifying gaffe, the American Auto Racing Writers & Broadcasters Association (AARWBA) created an annual award for the Indianapolis 500. The plaque consists of a gold-colored metal whiskey jigger attached to a base, awarded to the year's "hard-luck" driver during qualifying. Selection criteria are very loose, and "blanket" awards for the entire month have been selected on more than one occasion. The recipient is usually one of the last drivers bumped from the field, or a driver who fails to qualify (especially if he/she made several unsuccessful attempts). Drivers that fail to qualify under unusual circumstances are a common theme.

In 1991, car owner Roger Penske was voted the winner, after pulling Emerson Fittipaldi from the qualifying line on pole day. Shortly thereafter, it began to rain, and Fittipaldi lost his chance to qualify for the pole position. Fittipaldi would have to be second day qualifier. In 2012 the recipient was Jean Alesi, who qualified 33rd. The criteria were based on Alesi's publicized struggles with the Lotus entry, making him the slowest car by over 4 mph, and more than 16 mph slower than the pole position winner. In recent years, the award has garnered less and less attention, and some years have not had a winner formally named.

- 1969 Jigger Sirois
- 1970 Tony Adamowicz
- 1971 John Mahler
- 1972 Art Pollard
- 1973 Johnny Parsons
- 1974 Al Loquasto
- 1975 AARWBA (for losing the trophy)
- 1976 Salt Walther
- 1977 Vern Schuppan
- 1978 Larry Cannon & Roger Rager
- 1979 USAC (race controversies)
- 1980 Janet Guthrie
- 1981 Bob Frey
- 1982 Geoff Brabham (crew failed to display the green flag to start his first attempt)
- 1983 Johnny Rutherford
- 1984 Bill Alsup
- 1985 Chet Fillip
- 1986 Mike Nish
- 1987 Phil Krueger
- 1988 Pancho Carter
- 1989 Johnny Rutherford
- 1990 Salt Walther
- 1991 Roger Penske (owner of Emerson Fittipaldi's car)
- 1992 Mike Groff
- 1993 Robby Gordon (for causing A. J. Foyt's retirement)
- 1994 Mark Smith ("Curse of the Smiths")
- 1995 Emerson Fittipaldi
- 1996 Two 500 miles races (Indy & Michigan)
- 1997 25/8 rule
- 1998 Scott Harrington
- 1999 Mike Borkowski
- 2000 Roberto Guerrero
- 2001 Raul Boesel
- 2002 Billy Roe
- 2003 Jeff Ward
- 2004 A. J. Foyt & Tony Stewart (for being "trouble makers")
- 2005 Arie Luyendyk Jr.
- 2006 Marty Roth
- 2007 P. J. Jones
- 2008 Mario Domínguez
- 2009 Bruno Junqueira
- 2010 Jay Howard
- 2012 Jean Alesi
- 2013 Michel Jourdain Jr.
- 2014 Sage Karam (for skipping Prom and Graduation to race)
- 2016 Marco Andretti
- 2018 James Hinchcliffe
