= Salt Walther =

American racing driver

- Walther's promotional headshot for the 1979 SCCA/CART Indy Car Series
- Born: 22 November 1947
- Died: 27 December 2012 (aged 65); Trotwood, Ohio, United States

David "Salt" Walther (November 22, 1947 – December 27, 2012) was a driver in the USAC and CART Championship Car series. He also drove NASCAR stock cars and unlimited hydroplane boats, and was a car owner in USAC. Walther is best remembered for a crash at the start of the 1973 Indianapolis 500 that left him critically injured. He recovered from his injuries, returned in 1974, and placed 9th in the 1976 race. He also co-drove a car with Bob Harkey to 10th place in 1975.

He was the son of George Walther Jr., owner of Dayton Steel Foundry, who fielded Indy 500 cars for Juan Manuel Fangio in 1958 and Mike Magill in 1959. His German-born grandfather George Walther Sr. established the foundry and was a prominent inventor and industrialist. His brother, George "Skipp" Walther III, was fatally injured while trying to qualify as an Unlimited driver at Miami Marine Stadium, in 1974.

David Walther was given the nickname "Salt" during his teen years, owing to his boat racing. He is one of eight unlimited hydroplane drivers to qualify for the Indianapolis 500.

== Indy car racing ==
Walther raced in Indy cars from 1970 to 1981, with 64 career starts. He finished in the top-ten 16 times, with a best finish of seventh (four times). He competed in the Indianapolis 500 from 1972 to 1976, and 1978 to 1979.

Walther first raced at Indianapolis in 1972, finishing 33rd and last due to a broken magneto.

=== 1973 Indianapolis 500 ===
At the 1973 Indianapolis 500, Walther qualified 17th but again finished last after one of the most spectacular and famous accidents in the history of the race. As the field received the green flag, Steve Krisiloff, on the inside of the third row, developed engine trouble and slowed down, producing a traffic jam on the main straightaway as the rest of the cars accelerated. Walther, forced to his right by drivers taking evasive action in front of him, touched wheels with Jerry Grant and was catapulted over the wall and into the catch fence above it. Walther maintained that he was hit from behind, forcing him into Grant, but this claim is not supported by films of the crash and is not widely accepted by other drivers.

The impact tore down a segment of the catch fence and ripped off the nose of Walther's car. His legs were exposed, and the fuel tanks were ruptured, which at that time were located on either side of the cockpit. The fuel sprayed out of the car, some of it reaching the front rows of the grandstand where several spectators suffered burns. The car crashed back onto the track and spun down the main straightaway upside-down, still spraying fuel which ignited into a huge fireball that enveloped the rest of the field. Blinded by the burning methanol, several other drivers crashed into Walther's car, and into each other, though none of the other drivers suffered serious injuries.

Walther's came to a stop upside-down at the entrance of turn one, with the driver's legs visible and sticking out of the broken nose. Walther was quickly rescued by track safety workers (with the help of Wally Dallenbach Sr.) and rushed to the hospital in critical condition.

Walther was fortunate to have had nearly all of the fuel sprayed out of the car, allowing the fire to burn out quickly, but he still suffered burns over 40% of his body, mostly on his left leg. He would require numerous surgeries over the rest of his life. Walther's most severe injuries were to his hands. The fingers on his left hand had to be partially amputated, and those on his crushed right hand eventually healed into unnatural angles. He wore a black glove over the left hand to cover the damage. Walther was in the University of Michigan Burn Center for two and a half months, only recovering enough to leave on August 17 that year.

=== 1974 to 1990 ===
After a year of recovery, Walther returned to Indianapolis in 1974, finishing 17th. In 1975, his car dropped out with ignition problems after only two laps, and he again finished 33rd. He became the only driver to finish last three times at Indianapolis. (George Snider finished 33rd in 1971, 1979, and 1987, but the 1979 field had 35 cars, thus Snider finished last only twice.) Just minutes after dropping out, Walther took over the car of Bob Harkey - another Walther team car, and drove it to a 10th-place finish. He was 12 laps down (losing at least a couple of those laps during the driver change) when the race was ended early due to rain on lap 174.

Walther scored his best result of 9th in the rain-shortened 1976 race. In 1977, Walther failed to qualify for the Indy 500, and attempted to buy (at an exorbitant price) one of the qualified cars. This plan, however, was later abandoned, and created considerable negative press. In 1978, Walther dropped out early with a bad clutch and proceeded to rant his frustration with his chief mechanic Tommy Smith during a heated television interview. Walther ran the 1979 Indy 500, finishing 12th, before failing to qualify in 1980.

Following struggles with an addiction to painkillers, Walther took a ten-year hiatus from racing. Walther attempted a comeback in 1990, driving the #77 for Walther Racing. On Bump Day, the final day of time trials, Walther qualified for the race only to be bumped out by a last-minute run by Rocky Moran. The American Auto Racing Writers & Broadcasters Association, Inc. awarded him the dubious "Jigger Award" for his efforts.

Due to his lack of success, as well as the considerable financial backing of his father, Walther was sometimes regarded as a rich playboy with more money than talent. In the December 1999-January 2000 issue of Champ Car magazine, racing journalist Robin Miller named him the third-worst Champ car driver, saying, "This wealthy young man had some of the best cars available in the 1970s. But vanity and a horrid attitude kept him from ever reaching the podium."

== Other racing ==
Racing the unlimited hydroplane Country Boy U-77, Walther's best finish was third at one race in 1974.

Walther also appeared in four NASCAR Winston Cup races from 1975 to 1977. His last NASCAR race was the 1977 Daytona 500, where, in a race in which several drivers crashed due to the high winds that day, he veered in front of leader Buddy Baker, sending both cars into the wall, and causing damage to the car of Dave Marcis, which was also involved in the incident. His best finish in NASCAR came in the 1976 Daytona 500, finishing 12th, despite spinning out early in that race after running into fluid from another car.

== Acting career ==
Walther appeared in an episode of The Dukes of Hazzard, and an episode of The Rockford Files, in 1979.

== Drug addiction and legal problems ==
Following the 1973 accident, Walther battled an addiction with pain killers that were used after the accident, notably dilaudid. As a result of this addiction, Walther suffered from personal and legal problems, including a long interruption in his racing career.

In a 2013 eBook written by Walther and longtime friend Chuck Little, Little notes that Walther's life spiraled following George Walther's retirement from Indy car racing at the end of the 1980 season. After George shut down the Walther Racing team, Salt attempted a Hollywood career as an actor, but wasted all his savings into parties, drugs, and alcoholic beverages, which got worse as time went on. He went through rehab several times in the mid-1980s, before attempting his Indy car comeback in 1990. His cousin, Todd Walther, served as the team owner of the #77 car. He failed to qualify at Indy in 1990 and 1991, and then became a father to a daughter in 1992.

In 1998, Walther was convicted of "illegal conveyance of painkillers into the jail" after trying to smuggle three Tylenol III tablets, each containing 60 milligrams of codeine, into his jail cell. He failed to show for his sentencing, and a warrant was issued for his arrest. He served six months in a minimum-security jail, and was placed on three years' probation. He completed a drug treatment program.

In 2000, Walther was sentenced to 180 days in jail for child endangering and 10 months in prison for violating terms of his probation in the 1998 drug case.

In April 2007, Walther pleaded guilty to failure to pay child support, and in July a warrant was issued for his arrest when he failed to pay by the July 10 deadline, facing up to 16 months in jail, and owing more than $20,000. Although Walther acknowledged guilt in the case, he defended himself, saying that he was bankrupt and had no ability to pay the amount of money requested by his ex-partner.

In July 2007, Walther remained at large and managed to elude Beavercreek and Centerville, Ohio, police after he was recognized by a police officer at a local gas station. An officer asked Walther to stand outside of his car, but he got back in his car and fled the scene. This added a felony charge of "fleeing and eluding" to Walther's warrant. He was eventually arrested on July 29, 2007, and held in the Warren County, Ohio jail.

On August 14, 2007, Walther was sentenced to 16 months in prison for felony nonsupport of dependents, and 10 months in prison violating the terms of his community control imposed in a 2005 case involving nonsupport, with 240 days of credit for time already served in jail. On November 15, he was sentenced to three years in prison after a jury convicted him of failing to comply with an order or signal of a police officer for the July incident. The prison terms were to run consecutively. Walther was incarcerated at Hocking Correctional Facility in Nelsonville, Ohio.

Walther died in Trotwood, Ohio, on December 27, 2012, at the age of 65, from a drug overdose.

== Racing record ==
=== CART PPG Indy Car World Series ===
(key) (Races in bold indicate pole position)

Year	Team	1	2	3	4	5	6	7	8	9	10	11	12	13	14	15	16	17	Rank	Points	Ref
1979	Dayton Walther	PHX; 12	ATL; 10	ATL; 10	INDY; 12	TRE	TRE	MCH; 8	MCH; 7	WGL	TRE	ONT; 20	MCH; 12	ATL	PHX				**18th**	**314**	
1980	Walmotor	ONT	INDY; DNQ	MIL	POC	MDO	MCH	WGL	MIL	ONT	MCH; 18	MEX	PHX						**57th**	**6**	
1981	Bignotti-Cotter Racing	PHX	MIL	ATL	ATL	MCH; 32	RIV	MIL	MCH	WGL	MEX	PHX							**NC**	**0**	
1990	Walther Motorsports	PHX	LBH	INDY; DNQ	MIL	DET	POR	CLE	MEA	TOR	MCH; DNS	DEN	VAN	MDO	ROA	NAZ	LAG		NC	-	
1991	Walther Motorsports	SRF	LBH	PHX	INDY; DNQ	MIL	DET	POR	CLE	MEA	TOR	MCH	DEN	VAN	MDO	ROA	NAZ	LAG	NC	-	

=== Indianapolis 500 results ===
Year	Chassis	Engine	Start	Finish
1972	Colt	Foyt	27th	33rd
1973	McLaren	Offy	17th	33rd
1974	McLaren	Offy	14th	17th
1975	McLaren	Offy	9th	33rd
1975	McLaren	Offy	Relieved Bob Harkey (laps 18–162); finished 10th	
1976	McLaren	Offy	22nd	9th
1977	McLaren	DGS	Failed to Qualify	
1978	McLaren	Cosworth	22nd	28th
1979	Penske	Cosworth	16th	12th
1980	Penske	Cosworth	Failed to Qualify	
1990	Penske	Cosworth	Bumped; First alternate	
1991	Penske	Cosworth	Failed to Qualify	

=== NASCAR ===
(key) (Bold – Pole position awarded by qualifying time. Italics – Pole position earned by points standings or practice time. * – Most laps led.)

==== Winston Cup Series ====
NASCAR Winston Cup Series results
Year	Team	No.	Make	1	2	3	4	5	6	7	8	9	10	11	12	13	14	15	16	17	18	19	20	21	22	23	24	25	26	27	28	29	30	NWCC	Pts	Ref
1975	Salt Walther	97	Chevy	RSD	DAY	RCH	CAR	BRI	ATL	NWS	DAR	MAR	TAL	NSV	DOV	CLT	RSD	MCH; 17																-	-	
1975	Salt Walther	4	Chevy																													ATL; DNQ	ONT	-	-	
1975	Ballard Racing	30	Chevy																DAY; 37	NSV	POC	TAL	MCH	DAR	DOV	NWS	MAR	CLT	RCH	CAR	BRI			-	-	
1976	Salt Walther	4	Chevy	RSD	DAY; 12	CAR	RCH	BRI	ATL	NWS	DAR	MAR	TAL	NSV	DOV	CLT	RSD	MCH	DAY	NSV	POC	TAL	MCH	BRI	DAR	RCH	DOV	MAR	NWS	CLT	CAR	ATL	ONT	-	-	
1977	Salt Walther	4	Chevy	RSD	DAY; 24	RCH	CAR	ATL	NWS	DAR	BRI	MAR	TAL	NSV	DOV	CLT	RSD	MCH	DAY	NSV	POC	TAL	MCH	BRI	DAR	RCH	DOV	MAR	NWS	CLT	CAR	ATL	ONT	-	-	
