= 1975 Pocono 500 =

(United States) 1975 Pocono 500
Race details
- 8th round of the 1975 USAC Championship Car season
- Date: June 29, 1975
- Official name: 1975 Schaefer 500
- Location: Long Pond, Pennsylvania
- Course: Permanent racing facility 2.5 mi / 4.023 km
- Distance: 170 laps 425 mi / 683.971 km
- Weather: Temperatures up to 84 °F (29 °C); wind speeds up to 20 miles per hour (32 km/h)

Pole position
- Driver: (United States) Gordon Johncock (Patrick Racing)
- Time: 183.281 mph

Podium
- First: (United States) A. J. Foyt (A. J. Foyt Racing)
- Second: (United States) Wally Dallenbach Sr. (Patrick Racing)
- Third: (United States) Bill Vukovich II (Fletcher Racing)

The 1975 Pocono 500, the 5th running of the event, was held at the Pocono Raceway in Long Pond, Pennsylvania, on Sunday, June 29, 1975. Branded as the 1975 Schaefer 500 for sponsorship reasons, A. J. Foyt became the first driver to win the Pocono 500 twice, with a rain-shortened victory.

== Background ==
Beginning in 1975, Olsonite sponsored the Triple Crown award, given to the driver who scored the most points in Indy car's three 500 mile races. The award carried a $1,500 prize, a diamond ring, and an annual trophy.

A.J. Foyt won the California 500 in March. In late May, Bobby Unser won the 1975 Indianapolis 500. Two weeks after Indianapolis, Foyt won a 150-mile race at the Milwaukee Mile.

== Practice ==
Practice started Wednesday, June 18. Windy conditions slowed speeds. Bobby Unser posted the fastest lap at 179.2 mph.

On Thursday, Gordon Johncock was fastest in practice at 182.038 mph. The session was interrupted by rain at 12:30 p.m. but re-opened for track activity at 3:24 p.m.

In Friday's practice, Gordon Johncock posted the fastest speed at 182.741 mph. Bobby Unser was second fastest at 182.334 mph.

== Time Trials ==
The Saturday, June 21, qualifying session consisted of a four-lap, ten-mile average speed. Bobby Unser posted a fast speed early with an average speed of 181.708 mph, and held the pole for several hours. Gordon Johncock waited until late afternoon to make his run and knocked Unser off the pole with average speed of 183.281 mph. A.J. Foyt came up just short in his attempt to sweep 500 mile race poles. Foyt was the second fastest qualifier at 182.778 mph. Jerry Grant was the third fastest qualifier at 181.864 mph.

Johnny Rutherford crashed in his first qualifying attempt. Coming through turn two, Rutherford's car spun 360 degrees and hit the wall with the right-rear corner. His McLaren team prepared a backup car and Rutherford made a second qualifying attempt in the afternoon. Driving the backup car, Rutherford posted the fifth-fastest qualifying speed.

== Race ==
Massive crowds estimated at over 110,000 spectators created a traffic jam entering the track. A.J. Foyt was forced to abandon his car, call for help on a CB radio, and fly a helicopter from a nearby parking lot into the track's garage area.

Prior to the race, 27 year-old paramentalist, The Astonishing Neal, attempted to set a world record for fastest speed while driving blindfolded. The Astonishing Neal had previously correctly predicted that Gordon Johncock would win the pole, Tom Bigelow would be the 33rd qualifier, and that Johnny Rutherford would hit the wall on his qualifying run. Neal covered his eyes with Play-Doh, cotton wrap, surgical tape, a blindfold, and a black hood before walking to the pace car, which had been parked where he could not see it. He was joined in the car by Chris Economaki and Associated Press photographer Dave Parker who took pictures of the speedometer from the back seat. The Astonishing Neal successfully completed a lap around the track, reaching a speed of 100 mph. In the days before the race, Guinness World Records backed out of verifying the record out of fear it would inspire others to attempt driving blindfolded.

Best-selling author James A. Michener, researching his 1976 book, Sports in America, was introduced to the crowd before the race. The grand marshal of the race was Olympic gold medalist pole vaulter Bob Seagren. Indianapolis Motor Speedway owner Tony Hulman gave the command to start engines for the fifth year in a row.

The race was delayed two hours by rain. When the track dried, polesitter Gordon Johncock led the first 12 laps. Coming back from a violent crash at Indianapolis, Tom Sneva climbed from the 12th starting position to sixth after two laps. A.J. Foyt took the lead on lap 13, and held it for the next 11 laps.

After leading two laps, Mario Andretti's quest to win at his home track ended on lap 79 with a burned piston. Pancho Carter led for 12 laps before falling out with gearbox problems on lap 84.

By the halfway point, it became a two-car battle between Foyt and Johncock, with each taking turns in the lead.

Running second on lap 140, Johncock spun in turn two and hit the wall with the rear of his car. Johncock had led 29 laps and finished 20th.

With rain approaching the track, Foyt increased the turbocharger boost on his car to build his lead.

Foyt held a 15-second lead over Wally Dallenbach when rain brought out a caution on lap 168. A double rainbow in turn one gave way to a heavy rain that moved from turn two towards the frontstretch. After two laps under yellow, the race was stopped and called official due to the wet conditions. Foyt became the first repeat winner at Pocono. One month earlier, the Indianapolis 500 was also shortened by rain. Foyt led 115 laps and earned $83,250 for the victory.

== Box score ==
Finish	Grid	No	Name	Entrant	Chassis	Engine	Laps	Time/Status	Led	Points
1	2	14	(United States) A. J. Foyt	A. J. Foyt Enterprises	Coyote	Foyt	170	3:01:13.300	115	1000
2	6	40	(United States) Wally Dallenbach	Patrick Racing	Wildcat	Offenhauser	170	Running	0	800
3	14	6	(United States) Bill Vukovich II	Fletcher Racing Team	Eagle	Offenhauser	169	Flagged	4	700
4	13	15	(United States) Roger McCluskey	Lindsey Hopkins Racing	Riley	Offenhauser	169	Flagged	0	600
5	31	45	(United States) Gary Bettenhausen	Don Gerhardt	Eagle	Offenhauser	168	Flagged	0	500
6	5	2	(United States) Johnny Rutherford	Team McLaren	McLaren M16D	Offenhauser	168	Flagged	0	400
7	26	89	(United States) John Martin	Automotive Technology	McLaren M16B	Offenhauser	166	Flagged	0	300
8	15	78	(United States) Jimmy Caruthers	Alex Morales Motorsports	Eagle	Offenhauser	166	Flagged	5	250
9	25	83	(United States) Bill Puterbaugh	Lee Elkins	Eagle 75	Offenhauser	166	Flagged	0	200
10	18	97	(United States) George Snider	Leader Card Racers	Eagle	Offenhauser	165	Flagged	0	150
11	28	24	(United States) Bentley Warren	Grant King Racers	King	Offenhauser	165	Flagged	0	100
12	20	86	(United States) Al Loquasto	Loquasto Racing	McLaren M16B	Offenhauser	165	Flagged	0	50
13	24	46	(United States) Rick Muther	Don Gerhardt	Eagle	Offenhauser	164	Flagged	0	0
14	3	73	(United States) Jerry Grant	Fred Carillo	Eagle	Offenhauser	151	Flagged	2	0
15	23	19	(United States) Sheldon Kinser	Grant King Racers	King	Offenhauser	150	Flagged	0	0
16	22	38	(United States) Jerry Karl	Carl Gehlhausen	King	Offenhauser	149	In pits	0	0
17	27	94	(United States) Lee Kunzman	Vatis Enterprises	Fiore	Offenhauser	147	Engine	0	0
18	29	63	(United States) Larry McCoy	James Bidwell	Rascar	Offenhauser	143	Flagged	0	0
19	30	58	(Canada) Eldon Rasmussen	Rasmussen Racing	Rascar	Foyt	141	Flagged	0	0
20	1	20	(United States) Gordon Johncock	Patrick Racing	Wildcat	DGS	139	Crash	29	0
21	33	17	(United States) Tom Bigelow	Vollstedt Enterprises	Vollstedt	Offenhauser	127	Flagged	0	0
22	4	48	(United States) Bobby Unser	All American Racers	Eagle	Offenhauser	101	Gearbox	0	0
23	21	44	(United States) Dick Simon	Dick Simon Racing	Eagle	Foyt	86	Wheel bearing	0	0
24	9	11	(United States) Pancho Carter	Fletcher Racing Team	Eagle	Offenhauser	84	Gearbox	12	0
25	10	21	(United States) Mario Andretti	Vel's Parnelli Jones Racing	Eagle	Offenhauser	79	Piston	2	0
26	16	93	(United States) Johnny Parsons	Vatis Enterprises	Eagle	Offenhauser	68	Piston	0	0
27	11	16	(United States) Bobby Allison	Penske Racing	McLaren M16C	Offenhauser	57	Ignition	0	0
28	19	10	(United States) Steve Krisiloff	Leader Card Racers	Eagle	Offenhauser	54	Valve	1	0
29	12	68	(United States) Tom Sneva	Penske Racing	McLaren M16C	Offenhauser	38	Injector	0	0
30	32	33	(United States) Bob Harkey	Dayton-Walther	McLaren M16C/D	Offenhauser	37	Radiator	0	0
31	7	12	(United States) Mike Mosley	Jerry O'Connell Racing	Eagle	Offenhauser	26	Piston	0	0
32	8	4	(United States) Al Unser	Vel's Parnelli Jones Racing	Eagle	Offenhauser	6	Intake valve	0	0
33	17	77	(United States) Salt Walther	Dayton-Walther	McLaren M16C/D	Offenhauser	3	Piston	0	0
