= 1975 California 500 =

American auto race

(United States) 1975 California 500
Race details
- Race 3 of 13 in the 1975 USAC Championship Car season
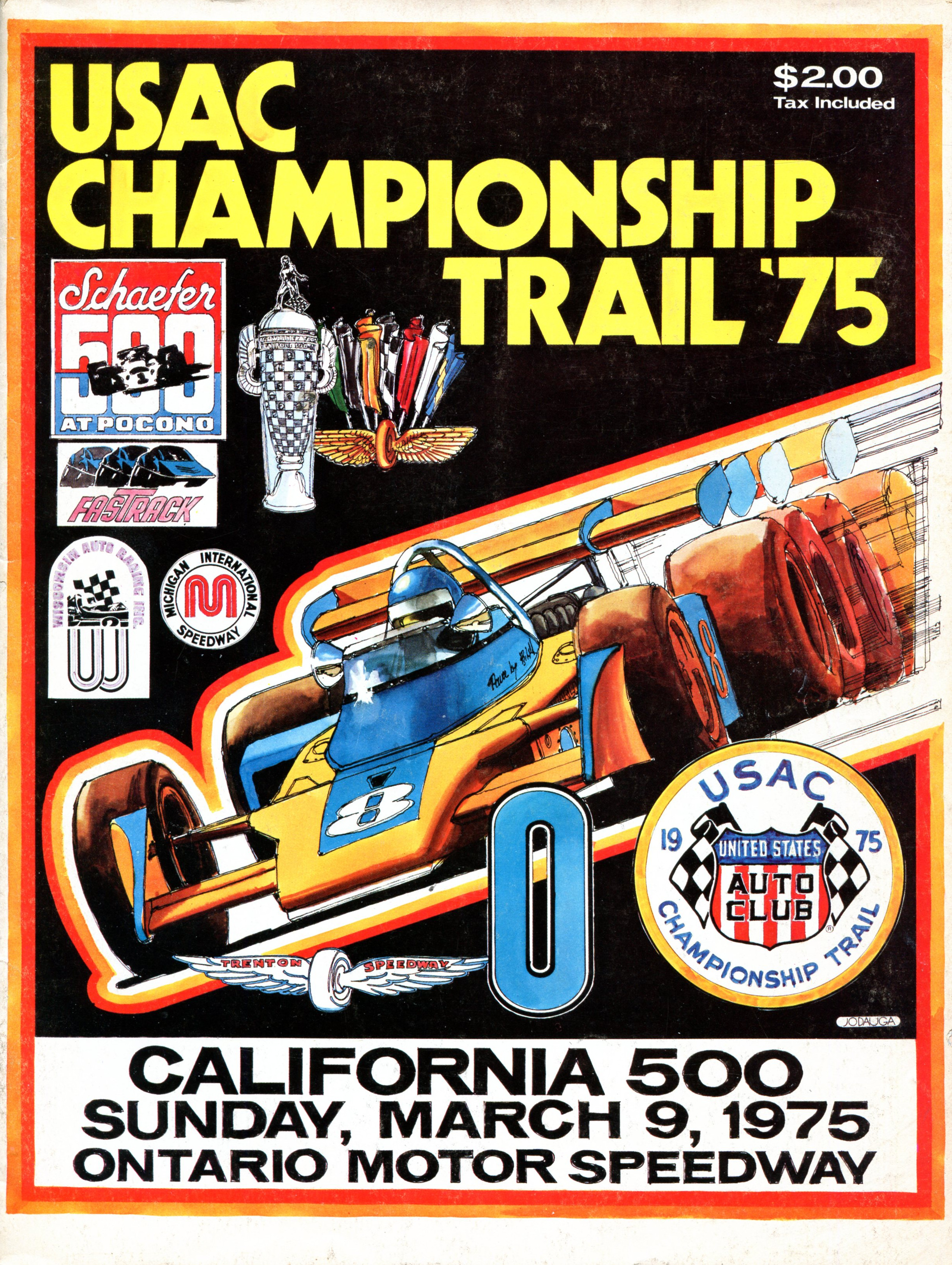
- Date: March 9, 1975
- Official name: 1975 California 500
- Location: Ontario Motor Speedway, Ontario, California, United States
- Course: Permanent racing facility 2.500 mi / 4.023 km
- Distance: 200 laps 500.000 mi / 804.672 km

Pole position
- Driver: (United States) A. J. Foyt (A. J. Foyt Racing)
- Time: 196.549 mph (316.315 km/h)

Podium
- First: (United States) A. J. Foyt (A. J. Foyt Racing)
- Second: (United States) Bobby Unser (All American Racers)
- Third: (United States) Steve Krisiloff (Ralph Wilke)

The 1975 California 500, the sixth running of the event, was held at the Ontario Motor Speedway in Ontario, California, on Sunday, March 9, 1975. The event was race number 3 of 13 in the 1975 USAC Championship Car season. The race was won by A. J. Foyt, his first California 500 victory.

== Background ==
On December 11, 1973, Lee Kunzman suffered a critical head injury while testing at Ontario. His car began to spin in turn one, hit the wall head-on, and then impacted the wall with the left-rear. Kunzman was in a coma for two weeks. He returned to racing in early 1975 at the California 500.

Jimmy Caruthers was diagnosed with a cancer in early January. Despite undergoing cobalt treatment five days a week, he still entered the California 500.

Joe Leonard attempted to make a comeback at Ontario. During the 1974 California 500, Leonard blew a left-front tire on the frontstretch. The car instantly veered to the left and impacted the inside pit wall. Leonard suffered a compound fracture to his left leg and a shattered left ankle. He was in a full leg cast for eight months. A. J. Foyt offered Leonard a car for the California 500 but the former champion failed a physical due to weakness in his left foot. Shortly after the California 500, Leonard filed a lawsuit against Firestone seeking loss of pay compensation, alleging an engineer admitted the tire was defective and separated. Leonard never raced in IndyCar again.

== Practice and Time Trials ==
Practice began on Saturday, February 22, with a special session for Mario Andretti before he left to compete in the 1975 South African Grand Prix. Andretti ran a fast speed of 182.6 mph on Saturday. On Sunday, Andretti ran a two-lap average of 185.128 mph to qualify for the race. He then took a helicopter to Los Angeles International Airport where a plane flew him to South Africa. Practice for the rest of the teams began on Tuesday. Al Unser was fastest with a speed of 188.282 mph. On Wednesday, Bobby Unser was fastest at 191.391 mph. A. J. Foyt arrived on Thursday for practice and backed up his speed the year prior with a top speed of 196.687 mph. One lap after posting that speed, Foyt blew an engine on the backstretch.

=== Pole Day - Saturday March 1 ===
As was done in the past two years, pole qualifying would set the front row for the California 500 and the starting lineup for two heat races held on Sunday. A. J. Foyt won the pole with a two-lap average speed of 196.549 mph. Bobby Unser was second at 194.553 mph, with two laps at the exact same speed. Completing the front row was Al Unser with an average speed of 192.864 mph. Mario Andretti's speed from six days earlier put him 18th fastest.

== Heat Races ==
The starting positions for the California 500 were set in part by a pair of 100-mile, 40-lap Heat Races on Sunday. Odd starting positions were in Heat One and even starting positions were in Heat Two. Each race paid 200 points towards the championship for the winner and paid money.

=== Race 1 ===
From the start of the race, A. J. Foyt was unchallenged. It was said he was capable of running two or three seconds a lap faster than the competition. Foyt led every lap and lapped the field. With three laps to go, John Martin blew an engine and brought out a race-ending caution flag. Only 4 of the 13 cars finished the race.

=== Heat one result ===
Finish	Grid	No	Name	Entrant	Chassis	Engine	Laps	Time/Status	Led	Points
1	1	14	(United States) A. J. Foyt	A. J. Foyt Enterprises	Coyote	Foyt	40	0:33:52.920	40	200
2	4	11	(United States) Pancho Carter	Fletcher Racing Team	Eagle	Offenhauser	39	Flagged	0	160
3	10	55	(United States) Lee Kunzman	Fletcher Racing Team	Eagle	Offenhauser	39	Flagged	0	140
4	11	76	(United States) Billy Scott	Webster Racing	Eagle	Offenhauser	38	Flagged	0	120
5	5	20	(United States) Gordon Johncock	Patrick Racing	Wildcat	DGS	36	Lost power	0	100
6	9	89	(United States) John Martin	Automotive Technology	McLaren M16B	Offenhauser	36	Engine	0	80
7	2	4	(United States) Al Unser	Vel's Parnelli Jones Racing	Eagle	Offenhauser	35	Fuel pump	0	60
8	8	15	(United States) Roger McCluskey	Lindsey Hopkins Racing	Riley	Offenhauser	34	Engine	0	50
9	3	68	(United States) Tom Sneva	Penske Racing	McLaren M16C	Offenhauser	29	Vent cap	0	40
10	6	12	(United States) Mike Mosley	Jerry O'Connell Racing	Eagle	Offenhauser	3	Valve	0	30
11	12	45	(United States) Gary Bettenhausen	Don Gerhardt	Eagle	Offenhauser	2	Engine	0	20
12	7	94	(United States) Johnny Parsons	Vatis Enterprises	Finley	Offenhauser	0	Did not start	0	0
13	13	97	(United States) George Snider	Leader Card Racers	Eagle	Offenhauser	0	Did not start	0	0

=== Race 2 ===
From his position on the pole, Bobby Unser led the first 14 laps, but retired with a burnt piston. Wally Dallenbach took the lead and held it until his pit stop on lap 24. Salt Walther ran out of fuel and brought out a caution on lap 25. On the restart on lap 31, Dallenbach passed Steve Krisiloff to retake the lead. Dallenbach held a slim lead over Johnny Rutherford when George Follmer crashed with three laps to go and brought out the race-ending caution flag. Follmer's car was unable to be repaired and withdrawn from the California 500.

=== Heat two result ===
Finish	Grid	No	Name	Entrant	Chassis	Engine	Laps	Time/Status	Led	Points
1	3	40	(United States) Wally Dallenbach	Patrick Racing	Eagle 75	Offenhauser	40	39:55.130	19	200
2	2	2	(United States) Johnny Rutherford	Team McLaren	McLaren M16D	Offenhauser	40	Running	0	160
3	4	98	(United States) Steve Krisiloff	Leader Card Racers	Eagle	Offenhauser	40	Running	5	140
4	6	6	(United States) Bill Vukovich II	Fletcher Racing Team	Eagle	Offenhauser	40	Running	2	120
5	5	78	(United States) Jimmy Caruthers	Alex Morales Motorsports	Eagle	Offenhauser	40	Running	0	100
6	8	16	(United States) Bobby Allison	Penske Racing	McLaren M16C	Offenhauser	40	Running	0	0
7	15	58	(Canada) Eldon Rasmussen	Rasmussen Racing	Rascar	Foyt	36	In pits	0	60
8	12	28	(United States) George Follmer	American Kids Racers	Eagle	Offenhauser	34	Crash	0	0
9	10	38	(United States) Jerry Karl	Carl Gehlhausen	King	Offenhauser	29	Out of fuel	0	40
10	1	48	(United States) Bobby Unser	All American Racers	Eagle	Offenhauser	24	Piston	14	30
11	11	27	(United States) Tom Bigelow	Vollstedt Enterprises	Vollstedt	Offenhauser	24	Lost power	0	20
12	7	77	(United States) Salt Walther	Dayton-Walther	McLaren M16C/D	Offenhauser	23	Lost power	0	10
13	16	44	(United States) Dick Simon	Dick Simon Racing	Eagle	Foyt	21	Universal joint	0	0
14	13	29	(United States) Lee Brayton	Eisenhour-Brayton Racing	Coyote	Foyt	10	Handling	0	0
15	9	86	(United States) Al Loquasto	Loquasto Racing	McLaren	Offenhauser	5	Turbocharger	0	0
16	14	73	(United States) Jerry Grant	Fred Carillo	Eagle	Offenhauser	3	Transmission	0	0
17	17	99	(United States) Bob Harkey	Joe Hunt	Gerhardt	Offenhauser	0	Did not start	0	0

== Race ==
Cloudy skies and rain on race morning hurt attendance. A crowd of 51,218 was the then-smallest in the six-year history of the California 500. The start of the race was delayed 30 minutes as the track was dried from a morning rain.

When the race began, A. J. Foyt pulled away from the field. The first caution came out on lap 7 when Bob Harkey lost a wheel bearing and came to a rest on track. Mario Andretti fell out of the race after 15 laps when he broke a connecting rod. Andretti's teammate, Al Unser, fell out of the race with a burnt piston on lap 25.

A sudden rain storm on lap 68 almost cost Foyt an easy victory. As Foyt entered turn three, he hit the wet track and slid completely sideways. He was able to gather up the car and continue.

While Foyt drove away from the field, the best battle on track was for third between Patrick Racing teammates Wally Dallenbach and Gordon Johncock. A broken radiator hose put Johncock out of the race on lap 149. Running second with 16 laps to go, Dallenbach blew an engine and retired.

Foyt led 187 of the 200 laps and beat Bobby Unser by 43 seconds. It was Foyt's first win in the California 500. He became the first man to win all races in the Triple Crown, having won the Indianapolis 500 in 1961, 1964, and 1967, and the Pocono 500 in 1973.

== Box score ==
Finish	Grid	No	Name	Entrant	Chassis	Engine	Laps	Time/Status	Led	Points
1	1	14	(United States) A. J. Foyt	A. J. Foyt Enterprises	Coyote	Foyt	200	3:14:22.280	187	1000
2	2	48	(United States) Bobby Unser	All American Racers	Eagle	Offenhauser	200	+43.410	9	800
3	7	98	(United States) Steve Krisiloff	Leader Card Racers	Eagle	Offenhauser	197	Flagged	0	700
4	19	55	(United States) Lee Kunzman	Fletcher Racing Team	Eagle	Offenhauser	195	Flagged	0	600
5	12	89	(United States) John Martin	Automotive Technology	McLaren M16B	Offenhauser	193	Flagged	0	500
6	14	68	(United States) Tom Sneva	Penske Racing	McLaren M16C	Offenhauser	193	Flagged	0	400
7	24	86	(United States) Al Loquasto	Loquasto Racing	McLaren M16B	Offenhauser	188	Flagged	0	300
8	16	77	(United States) Salt Walther	Dayton-Walther	McLaren M16C/D	Offenhauser	187	Flagged	0	250
9	25	58	(Canada) Eldon Rasmussen	Rasmussen Racing	Rascar	Foyt	186	Flagged	0	200
10	4	40	(United States) Wally Dallenbach	Patrick Racing	Eagle	Offenhauser	184	Piston	0	150
11	15	12	(United States) Mike Mosley	Jerry O'Connell Racing	Eagle	Offenhauser	179	Piston	0	100
12	28	73	(United States) Jerry Grant	Fred Carillo	Eagle	Offenhauser	178	Flagged	0	50
13	13	15	(United States) Roger McCluskey	Lindsey Hopkins Racing	Riley	Offenhauser	170	Engine	0	0
14	26	45	(United States) Gary Bettenhausen	Don Gerhardt	Eagle	Offenhauser	168	Flagged	0	0
15	10	20	(United States) Gordon Johncock	Patrick Racing	Wildcat	DGS	149	Radiator hose	0	0
16	22	27	(United States) Tom Bigelow	Vollstedt Enterprises	Vollstedt	Offenhauser	123	Oil pressure	0	0
17	5	2	(United States) Johnny Rutherford	Team McLaren	McLaren M16D	Offenhauser	86	Piston	4	0
18	32	23	(United States) Jim McElreath	Crower Engineering	Eagle	Chevrolet	84	Connecting rod	0	0
19	6	11	(United States) Pancho Carter	Fletcher Racing Team	Eagle	Offenhauser	83	Gearbox	0	0
20	31	97	(United States) George Snider	Leader Card Racers	Eagle	Offenhauser	58	Overheating	0	0
21	9	78	(United States) Jimmy Caruthers	Alex Morales Motorsports	Eagle	Offenhauser	54	Valve	0	0
22	27	29	(United States) Lee Brayton	Eisenhour-Brayton Racing	Coyote	Foyt	46	Black flagged (too slow)	0	0
23	8	6	(United States) Bill Vukovich II	Fletcher Racing Team	Eagle	Offenhauser	39	Piston	0	0
24	23	44	(United States) Dick Simon	Dick Simon Racing	Eagle	Foyt	37	Piston	0	0
25	17	94	(United States) Johnny Parsons	Vatis Enterprises	Finley	Offenhauser	34	Gearbox	0	0
26	3	4	(United States) Al Unser	Vel's Parnelli Jones Racing	Eagle	Offenhauser	24	Piston	0	0
27	29	10	(United States) Rick Muther	A. J. Foyt Enterprises	Coyote	Foyt	17	Clutch	0	0
28	18	21	(United States) Mario Andretti	Vel's Parnelli Jones Racing	Eagle	Offenhauser	15	Connecting rod	0	0
29	20	76	(United States) Billy Scott	Webster Racing	Eagle	Offenhauser	7	Piston	0	0
30	30	99	(United States) Bob Harkey	Joe Hunt	Eagle	Offenhauser	5	Wheel bearing	0	0
31	33	33	(United States) Larry McCoy	Dayton-Walther	McLaren	Offenhauser	3	Oil pressure	0	0
32	11	16	(United States) Bobby Allison	Penske Racing	McLaren M16C	Offenhauser	2	Valve	0	0
33	21	38	(United States) Jerry Karl	Carl Gehlhausen	King	Offenhauser	1	Piston	0	0

== Aftermath ==
Ontario Motor Speedway was built using public bonds and the bond-owners were represented by the non-profit Ontario Motor Speedway Corporation. Since 1973, a group led by Parnelli Jones and Tony Hulman leased Ontario Motor Speedway and promoted racing events there. 15 days after the 1975 California 500, Jones announced that the group would terminate their lease with the non-profit group. Jones said, "We have lost a lot of money and the future doesn't look any better. There is too much politics involved in the speedway. We have to answer to the non-profit board that oversees the track, to the bank that represents the bond holders, and to the City Council, which can tell us what we can and can't promote." Moving forward, OMS Corp. eliminated the business of leasing to promoter groups and rehired Ray Smartis as General Manager on their behalf, who had worked with the track under past groups. Under his leadership, Smartis realized the track was unsustainable by using it only as a venue for large events and aimed to have the track pay their bills through small events such as swap meets, film production rentals, and concerts. The large events would help the track be profitable.

Smartis also moved the California 500 back to its original Labor Day weekend. "Running the California 500 in March proved to be a financial disaster," Smartis said in August 1975. "Considerable research had gone into the Labor Day scheduling back in 1968 when the speedway was built and that was the best possible time." Indy cars would return to Ontario in March with a 200-mile doubleheader paired with a USAC Stock Car race.

Previous race: 1974 Phoenix 150	USAC Championship Car; 1975 season	Next race: 1975 Bricklin 150
Previous race: 1974 California 500	California 500	Next race: 1976 California 500
