= 1976 California 500 =

American auto race

(United States) 1976 California 500
Race details
- Race 10 of 13 in the 1976 USAC Championship Car season
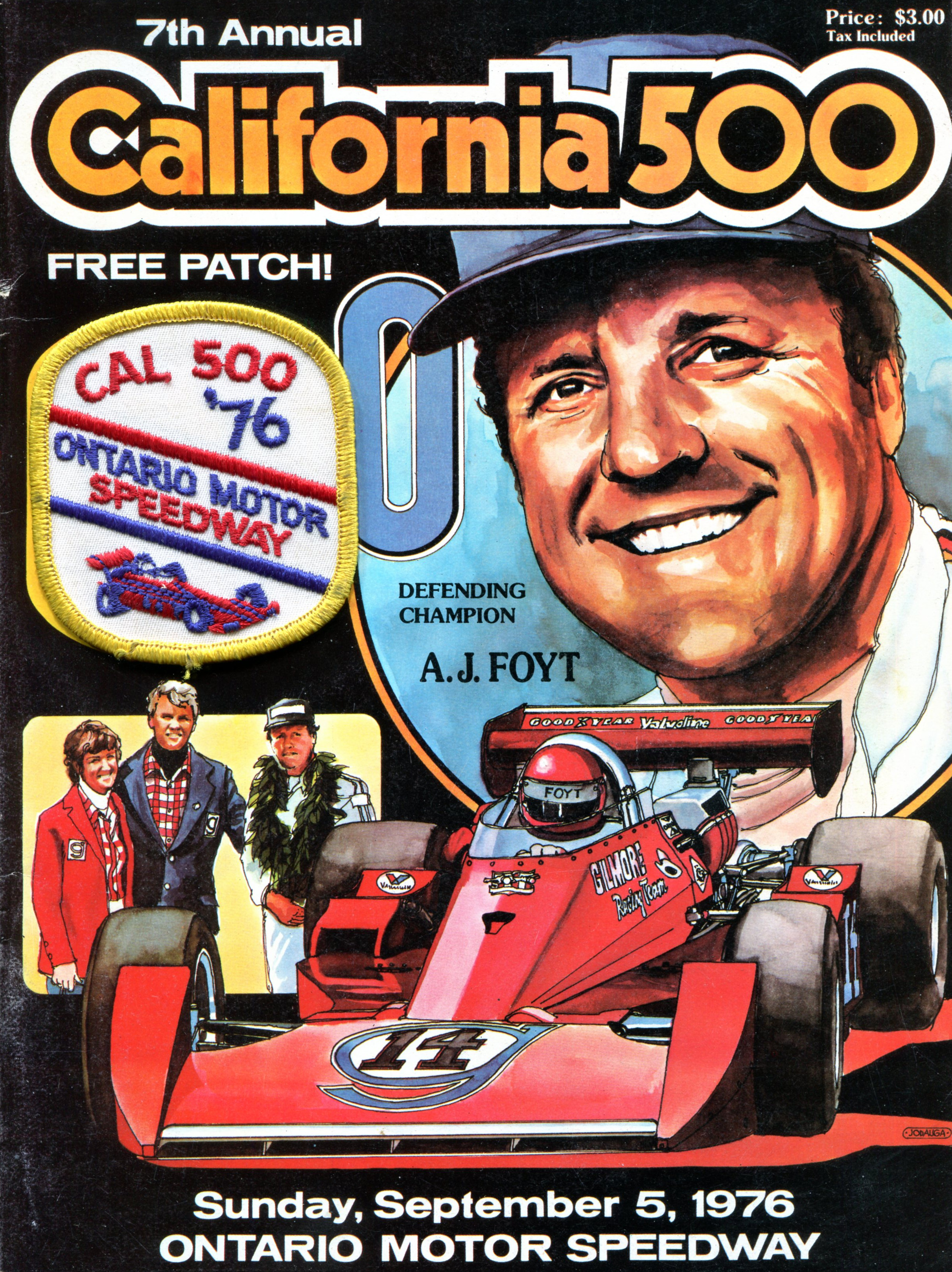
- Date: September 5, 1976
- Official name: 1976 California 500
- Location: Ontario Motor Speedway, Ontario, California, United States
- Course: Permanent racing facility 2.500 mi / 4.023 km
- Distance: 200 laps 500.000 mi / 804.672 km

Pole position
- Driver: (United States) A. J. Foyt (A. J. Foyt Racing)
- Time: 190.416 mph (306.445 km/h)

Podium
- First: (United States) Bobby Unser (Fletcher Racing)
- Second: (United States) Johnny Rutherford (McLaren)
- Third: (United States) Gordon Johncock (Patrick Racing)

The 1976 California 500, the seventh running of the event, was held at the Ontario Motor Speedway in Ontario, California, on Sunday, September 5, 1976. The event was race number 10 of 13 in the 1976 USAC Championship Car season. The race was won by Bobby Unser, becoming the first man to win the California 500 twice. The race was also the first Indy Car race for Rick Mears.

== Background ==
Ontario Motor Speedway was built using public bonds and the bond-owners were represented by the non-profit Ontario Motor Speedway Corporation. Beginning in 1973, a group led by Parnelli Jones and Tony Hulman leased Ontario Motor Speedway and promoted racing events there. 15 days after the 1975 California 500, Jones announced that the group would terminate their lease with the non-profit group. Jones said, "We have lost a lot of money and the future doesn't look any better. There is too much politics involved in the speedway. We have to answer to the non-profit board that oversees the track, to the bank that represents the bond holders, and to the City Council, which can tell us what we can and can't promote."

Moving forward, OMS Corp. eliminated the business of leasing to promoter groups and rehired Ray Smartis as General Manager on their behalf, who had worked with the track under past groups. Under his leadership, Smartis realized the track was unsustainable by using it only as a venue for large events and aimed to have the track pay their bills through small events such as swap meets, film production rentals, and concerts. The large events would help the track be profitable.

Smartis also moved the California 500 back to its original Labor Day weekend. "Running the California 500 in March proved to be a financial disaster," Smartis said in August 1975. "Considerable research had gone into the Labor Day scheduling back in 1968 when the speedway was built and that was the best possible time."

Indy cars were scheduled to return to Ontario in March with a 200-mile doubleheader paired with a USAC Stock Car race. In January 1976, the March doubleheader was canceled by the track due to a lack of sponsorship.

The move to Labor Day, once again made the California 500 the final leg in IndyCar's Triple Crown. In May, Johnny Rutherford won the Indianapolis 500. In the second Crown Jewel race, Al Unser won the Pocono 500.

Janet Guthrie entered the California 500 and attempted to become the first woman to compete in the California 500. Earlier that year, Guthrie attempted to qualify for the Indianapolis 500 and was the first woman to compete in a 500-mile Indy Car when she competed in the Pocono 500. In addition, Rick Mears and Danny Ongais made their Indy car debut at the California 500. Mears was driving a car owned by Bill Simpson while Ongais drove for Vel's Parnelli Jones Racing.

== Practice and Time Trials ==
Unlike in past years, practice and Time Trials were reduced to one week instead of two, with practice beginning on Sunday August 29. On the first day of practice, Bobby Unser posted the fastest speed at 185.594 mph. In Monday's practice, Johnny Rutherford was fastest with a speed of 187.153 mph. Al Loquasto crashed in turn one. Later, Al Unser spun and hit the turn one wall, impacting the concrete with the rear of the car and climbing several feet off the ground. Both crashes were blamed on high winds.

Rutherford posted the fastest speed on Tuesday at 188.957 mph. A. J. Foyt arrived at the track on Tuesday after spending time with his mother in Houston who suffered a stroke on Sunday. Foyt ran only two laps before a leaky radiator forced him back to the garage.

=== Pole Day - Wednesday September 1 ===
For the first time since 1972, qualifying was a four-lap, 10 mile average speed. The Heat Races that had been run the last three years were also canceled.

Despite having only a few hours of practice, A. J. Foyt won his third consecutive California 500 pole with an average speed of 190.416 mph. Roger McCluskey was second fastest at 189.235 mph. Tom Sneva completed the front row with a speed of 189.215 mph. Johnny Rutherford, who had been among the fastest in practice, could only produce the seventh fastest speed due to high winds on his qualifying run.

=== Bump Day - Thursday September 2 ===
Inaugural California 500 winner, Jim McElreath found himself without a ride entering the final day of qualifying. McElreath stood in his firesuit on pit road in the event that a team would have an open car for him to qualify. With one hour left in time trials, car-owner Warner Hodgdon hired McElreath to replace his driver Billy Scott who was four miles per hour slower than the time needed to make the race. With 10 minutes left in qualifying, McElreath made his run. Without any practice laps in the car, McElreath was three mph faster than Scott, but at 174.995 mph, was still one mph slower than what was needed to make the race. After a second lap was no faster, he graciously pulled off the track to allow Al Loquasto a chance to qualify before time expired. The crowd at the track gave McElreath a standing ovation for his sportsmanship. Loquasto was not fast enough to qualify.

Janet Guthrie failed to qualify for the race. Two laps of 174.757 and 173.444 were the quickest the car was capable of before the crew aborted the run.

== Race ==
A reported crowd of 52,466 spectators attended the California 500.

From his position on the pole, A.J. Foyt led the first 14 laps. Roger Rager brought out a caution flag when he spun on lap 14 and Foyt chose to pit under caution. On the restart, Eldon Rasmussen blew an engine and brought out the second caution to clean oil. On lap after the restart, Dick Simon stalled on track and the caution flag was displayed again.

In an impressive Indycar debut, Danny Ongais climbed from 11th starting spot to fifth by lap 50. Exiting turn two on lap 54, Ongais suffered a broken halfshaft which sent his car into the outside wall along the backstretch. The car climbed the wall and flipped, landing upside down and sliding along the backstretch. Pancho Carter spun to avoid Ongais and impacted the outside wall. Salt Walther came upon the wreck, stopped his car, and ran over to help Ongais. Carter and Walther flipped the car over to allow Ongais to walk away from the wreck. Ongais's helmet had swirl marks on it from where it dragged along the asphalt. He was checked and released at the infield hospital where he complained of a sore head and bruised feet.

On the restart following Ongais's crash, John Mahler crashed in turn one. After six laps of green flag racing, Bill Vukovich Jr. crashed in turn one on lap 77. A.J. Foyt retired from the race on lap 77 when he lost oil pressure.

On lap 101, Gordon Johncock, Wally Dallenbach, and Johnny Rutherford entered the pits under green. Watching the two cars in front of him, Rutherford missed his pit box and had to go around the track another lap.

The race turned into a four car battle between Bobby Unser, Gordon Johncock, Wally Dallenbach, and Johnny Rutherford. After the last cycle of pit stops, Unser took the lead with 23 laps remaining.

The caution was thrown on with only seven laps remaining when beer cans were thrown on the track. This set up a four lap run to the finish with Unser followed by Rutherford and Johncock.

Unser won by 2.54 seconds and became the first man to win the California 500 twice, having previously won the 1974 California 500. By finishing second, Rutherford won the Olsonite Triple Crown championship for 500-mile races and the $1,500 prize it carried.

== Box score ==
Finish	Grid	No	Name	Entrant	Chassis	Engine	Laps	Time/Status	Led	Points
1	10	3	(United States) Bobby Unser	Fletcher Racing Team	Eagle 76	Offenhauser	200	3:29:25.760	53	1000
2	7	2	(United States) Johnny Rutherford	Team McLaren	McLaren M16E	Offenhauser	200	+2.540	24	800
3	6	20	(United States) Gordon Johncock	Patrick Racing	Wildcat Mk2	DGS	200	Running	69	700
4	5	40	(United States) Wally Dallenbach	Patrick Racing	Wildcat Mk2	DGS	198	Flagged	36	600
5	12	24	(United States) Tom Bigelow	Leader Card Racers	Eagle	Offenhauser	196	Flagged	0	500
6	23	18	(United States) Jan Opperman	Longhorn Racing	Eagle	Offenhauser	194	Flagged	0	400
7	26	83	(United States) Bill Puterbaugh	Lee Elkins	Eagle 74	Offenhauser	193	Flagged	0	300
8	20	38	(United States) Rick Mears	Bill Simpson	Eagle	Offenhauser	192	Flagged	0	250
9	27	78	(United States) Bobby Olivero	Alex Morales Motorsports	Eagle	Offenhauser	192	Flagged	0	200
10	15	73	(United States) Jerry Grant	Fred Carillo	Eagle	AMC	191	Flagged	0	150
11	33	8	(United States) Todd Gibson	Routh Meat Packaging	Eagle	Offenhauser	191	Flagged	0	100
12	21	97	(United States) Sheldon Kinser	J. C. Agajanian	King	Offenhauser	190	Flagged	0	50
13	30	19	(United States) Spike Gehlhausen	Carl Gehlhausen	McLaren M16B	Offenhauser	189	Flagged	0	0
14	14	6	(United States) Bill Simpson	Bill Simpson	McLaren	Offenhauser	187	Flagged	2	0
15	9	12	(United States) Mike Mosley	Jerry O'Connell Racing	Eagle	Offenhauser	185	Oil tank	0	0
16	13	45	(United States) Steve Krisiloff	Don Gerhardt	Eagle	Offenhauser	181	Flagged	0	0
17	28	44	(United States) Roger Rager	Dick Simon Racing	Eagle	Foyt	161	Oil pressure	0	0
18	24	98	(United States) John Martin	J. C. Agajanian	King	Offenhauser	147	Rear end	0	0
19	29	23	(United States) Mike Hiss	Leader Card Racers	Eagle	Offenhauser	134	Ignition	0	0
20	19	65	(United States) Lee Kunzman	Pat Santello	Eagle	Offenhauser	133	Piston	0	0
21	2	7	(United States) Roger McCluskey	Lindsey Hopkins Racing	Lightning	Offenhauser	119	Valve spring	0	0
22	17	77	(United States) Salt Walther	Dayton-Walther	McLaren M16C/D	Offenhauser	95	Engine	0	0
23	1	14	(United States) A. J. Foyt	A. J. Foyt Enterprises	Coyote	Foyt	77	Oil pressure	14	0
24	16	5	(United States) Bill Vukovich II	Alex Morales Motorsports	Eagle	Offenhauser	75	Crash	0	0
25	25	76	(United States) John Mahler	Webster Racing	Eagle	Offenhauser	63	Crash	0	0
26	3	68	(United States) Tom Sneva	Penske Racing	McLaren M16C/D	Offenhauser	60	Ignition	2	0
27	22	99	(United States) Gary Bettenhausen	Joe Hunt	Eagle	Offenhauser	56	Engine	0	0
28	11	25	(United States) Danny Ongais	Interscope Racing	Parnelli	Offenhauser	54	Crash	0	0
29	4	48	(United States) Pancho Carter	All American Racers	Eagle	Offenhauser	54	Crash	0	0
30	18	17	(United States) Dick Simon	Vollstedt Enterprises	Vollstedt	Offenhauser	32	Piston	0	0
31	32	58	(Canada) Eldon Rasmussen	Rasmussen Racing	Rascar	Foyt	20	Engine	0	0
32	8	21	(United States) Al Unser	Vel's Parnelli Jones Racing	Parnelli VPJ6B	Cosworth DFX	13	Engine	0	0
33	31	61	(United States) Mel Kenyon	Lindsey Hopkins Racing	Coyote	Foyt	8	Piston	0	0
