= 1975 USAC Championship Car season =

Sports season

- USAC National Championship Trail

Season
- Races: 13
- Start date: March 2
- End date: November 9

Awards
- National champion: (United States) A. J. Foyt
- Indianapolis 500 winner: (United States) Bobby Unser

The 1975 USAC Championship Car season consisted of 13 races, beginning in Ontario, California on March 2 and concluding in Avondale, Arizona on November 9. The USAC National Champion was A. J. Foyt and the Indianapolis 500 winner was Bobby Unser.

== Entrants ==
(partial list)

Team	Chassis	Engine	Drivers	Rounds
(United States) A.J. Foyt Enterprises	Coyote	Foyt	(United States) A.J. Foyt	1, 3-13
(United States) All American Racers	Eagle	Offenhauser	(United States) Bobby Unser	2-3, 6-9, 11
(United States) Bob Fletcher	Eagle	Offenhauser	(United States) Lee Kunzman	1, 3
(United States) Bob Fletcher	Eagle	Offenhauser	(United States) Pancho Carter	1, 3-4, 6-13
(United States) MVS	Eagle	Offenhauser	(United States) Lee Kunzman	6
(United States) Alex Morales	Eagle	Offenhauser	(United States) Jimmy Caruthers	2-4, 6, 8-12
(United States) Gerhardt	Eagle	Offenhauser	(United States) Gary Bettenhausen	1, 3-4, 7-10, 13
(United States) Grant King	King	Offenhauser	(United States) Bentley Warren	6, 8
(United States) Grant King	King	Offenhauser	(United States) Sheldon Kinser	6, 8
(United States) Jerry O"Connell Racing	Eagle	Offenhauser	(United States) Bill Vukovich II	2-4, 6-11, 13
(United States) Jerry O"Connell Racing	Eagle	Offenhauser	(United States) Mike Mosley	1, 3-10
(United States) Jerry O"Connell Racing	Eagle	Offenhauser	(United States) Al Unser	12
(United States) Jerry O"Connell Racing	Eagle	Offenhauser	(United States) Mario Andretti	13
(United States) Joe Hunt	Eagle	Offenhauser	(United States) John Martin	13
(United States) Lindsey Hopkins Racing	McLaren (5); Riley (1, 3-4, 6-13)	Offenhauser	(United States) Roger McCluskey	1, 3-13
(United States) George Walther	McLaren	Offenhauser	(United States) Salt Walther	2-9, 11-12
(United States) Gerhardt	Eagle	Offenhauser	(United States) George Snider	9
(United States) Dick Simon	Eagle	Foyt	(United States) Dick Simon	2-13
(United States) Leader Card Racing	Eagle	Offenhauser	(United States) George Snider	2-13
(United States) Al Loquasto	McLaren	Offenhauser	(United States) Al Loquasto	2-6, 8-9, 11-13
(United States) John Martin	McLaren	Offenhauser	(United States) John Martin	1, 3-12
(United Kingdom) McLaren	McLaren	Offenhauser	(United States) Johnny Rutherford	2-13
(United States) Patrick Racing	Eagle (3-4); Wildcat (1, 5-13)	Offenhauser (3-4) (DGS (1, 5-13)	(United States) Gordon Johncock	1, 3-13
(United States) Patrick Racing	Eagle (1-5, 10); Wildcat (6-9, 11-13)	Offenhauser (1-5, 10); DGS (6-9, 11-13)	(United States) Wally Dallenbach	2-13
(United States) Patrick Racing	Eagle	Offenhauser	(United States) Steve Krisiloff	2-13
(United States) Team Penske	McLaren	Offenhauser	(United States) Tom Sneva	1, 3-6, 8-13
(United States) Team Penske	McLaren	Offenhauser	(United States) Bobby Allison	2-3, 6, 8-9
(United States) Vatis Enterprises	Finley	Offenhauser	(United States) Lee Kunzman	8
(United States) Vatis Enterprises	Finley (1, 3-5, 7-12) Eagle (6)	Offenhauser	(United States) Johnny Parsons	1, 3-12
(United States) Vel's Parnelli Jones Racing	Eagle	Offenhauser	(United States) Mario Andretti	3, 6, 8
(United States) Vel's Parnelli Jones Racing	Eagle (1, 3, 6, 8); Parnelli (13)	Offenhauser (1, 3, 6, 8); Cosworth (13)	(United States) Al Unser	1, 3, 6, 8, 13
(United States) Volstedt Enterprises	Volstedt	Offenhauser	(United States) Tom Bigelow	2-3, 6-10, 13

== Schedule and results ==
All races running on Oval/Speedway.

Rnd	Date	Race name	Track	Location	Pole position	Winning driver
1A	March 2	California 500 Qualification Heat 1	Ontario Motor Speedway	Ontario, California	(United States) A. J. Foyt	(United States) A. J. Foyt
1B	March 2	California 500 Qualification Heat 2	Ontario Motor Speedway	Ontario, California	(United States) Bobby Unser	(United States) Wally Dallenbach
2	March 9	California 500	Ontario Motor Speedway	Ontario, California	(United States) A. J. Foyt	(United States) A. J. Foyt
3	March 16	Bricklin 150	Phoenix International Raceway	Avondale, Arizona	(United States) Gordon Johncock	(United States) Johnny Rutherford
4	April 6	Trenton 200	Trenton International Speedway	Trenton, New Jersey	(United States) Tom Sneva	(United States) A. J. Foyt
NC	April 27	World Series of Auto Racing	Trenton International Speedway	Trenton, New Jersey	(United States) A. J. Foyt	(United States) Johnny Rutherford
5	May 25	International 500 Mile Sweepstakes^1	Indianapolis Motor Speedway	Speedway, Indiana	(United States) A. J. Foyt	(United States) Bobby Unser
6	June 8	Rex Mays Classic	Wisconsin State Fair Park Speedway	West Allis, Wisconsin	(United States) A. J. Foyt	(United States) A. J. Foyt
7	June 29	Schaefer 500	Pocono International Raceway	Long Pond, Pennsylvania	(United States) Gordon Johncock	(United States) A. J. Foyt
8	July 20	Norton 200	Michigan International Speedway	Brooklyn, Michigan	(United States) A. J. Foyt	(United States) A. J. Foyt
9	August 17	Tony Bettenhausen 200	Wisconsin State Fair Park Speedway	West Allis, Wisconsin	(United States) Johnny Rutherford	(United States) Mike Mosley
10	September 13	Michigan Grand Prix	Michigan International Speedway	Brooklyn, Michigan	(United States) A. J. Foyt	(United States) Tom Sneva
11	September 21	Trenton 150	Trenton International Speedway	Trenton, New Jersey	(United States) A. J. Foyt	(United States) Gordon Johncock
12	November 9	Phoenix 150	Phoenix International Raceway	Avondale, Arizona	(United States) Gordon Johncock	(United States) A. J. Foyt

Non-championship race

^1 Scheduled for 500 miles, stopped early due to rain.

== Final points standings ==
Note 1: Bobby Allison and George Follmer are not eligible for points.
Note 2: Jerry Grant scored points at Ontario but competed with an FIA license.
Note 3: Bentley Warren scored 100 points at Pocono, but forfeited those points due to a rule violation.

Pos	Driver	ONT			PHX1	TRE1	WSE	INDY	MIL1	POC	MIS1	MIL2	MIS2	TRE2	PHX2	Pts
Pos	Driver	QH1	QH2	R	PHX1	TRE1	WSE	INDY	MIL1	POC	MIS1	MIL2	MIS2	TRE2	PHX2	Pts
1	(United States) A. J. Foyt	**1**		**1**	3	1	**4**	**3**	**1**	1	**1**	20	**7**	**2**	1	4920
2	(United States) Johnny Rutherford		2	17	1	2	1	2	3	6	6	**13**	2	3	11	2900
3	(United States) Bobby Unser		**10**	2				1	2	22	5		3			2489
4	(United States) Wally Dallenbach		1	10	6	5	3	9	4	2	19	4	16	5	12	2305
5	(United States) Bill Vukovich II		4	23	4		9	6	7	3	3	8	11		4	2080
6	(United States) Tom Sneva	9		6	7	**6**	7	22		29	2	3	1	13	2	1830
7	(United States) Roger McCluskey	8		13		7	6	5	8	4	12	19	5	6	18	1675
8	(United States) Steve Krisiloff		3	3	5	4	5	11	17	28	8	5	DNS	15	20	1630
9	(United States) Pancho Carter	2		19	8			4	6	24	4	14	8	DNS	8	1345
10	(United States) Gordon Johncock	5		15	**2**	10	2	31	14	**20**	11	2	6	1	**23**	1280
11	(United States) John Martin	6		5	13	9	8	27	15	7	21	7	18	8	17	1180
12	(United States) Mike Mosley	10		11	9	3		26	5	31	13	1				1020
13	(United States) Jimmy Caruthers		5	21				14		8	7	6	4	7		930
14	(United States) Gary Bettenhausen	11		14	10			15	9	5	Wth				6	745
15	(United States) Lee Kunzman	3		4				DNQ		17						740
16	(United States) Bill Puterbaugh							7		9					9	560
17	(United States) Al Unser	7		26				16		32				4	5	450
18	(United States) George Snider	DNS		20	18			8		10	22					400
19	(United States) Al Loquasto		15	7	11	DNS		DNQ		12	14		17	14	16	380
20	(Canada) Eldon Rasmussen		7	9				24		19		16	12		21	275
21	(United States) Salt Walther		12	8	17	13		33		33	DNQ		22	18		260
22	(United States) Dick Simon		13	24	14	8	11	21	13	23	9	17	15	11	13	220
23	(United States) Mario Andretti			28				28		25					3	210
24	(United States) Spike Gehlhausen RY								10		10	15	19	10	14	165
25	(United States) Billy Scott	4		29				DNQ							Wth	120
26	(United States) Tom Bigelow		11	16				18	12	21	16	9	Wth		19	115
27	(United States) Johnny Parsons	DNS		25	12	12	10	19	20	26	15	21	13	9	Wth	115
28	(United States) John Hubbard					14		Wth	21			10	10	16	DNQ	105
29	(United States) Larry Cannon							DNQ				12	9	12		100
30	(United States) Jim McElreath			18		16	12								7	90
31	(United States) Tom Frantz R				19				11			11	14	17	24	70
32	(United States) Sheldon Kinser R							12		15						50
33	(United States) Lloyd Ruby							32							10	45
34	(United States) Jerry Karl		9	33				13		16						40
35	(United States) Billy Cassella R					11										40
36	(United States) Bob Harkey	DNS		30	16			10		30			21		15	14
-	(United States) Bobby Allison		6	32				25		27	17					0
-	(United States) George Follmer		8	DNS				Wth								0
-	(United States) Bentley Warren							23		11						0
-	(United States) Jerry Grant		16	12				20		14	18				DNQ	0
-	(United States) Rick Muther			27				DNQ		13						0
-	(United States) Lee Brayton		14	22							DNQ					0
-	(United States) Chuck Gurney R				15	15		Wth	18							0
-	(United States) Mel Cornett								16							0
-	(United States) Sam Sessions							17								0
-	(United States) Larry McCoy			31				30		18	20		20			0
-	(United States) Ed Finley R											18			DNQ	0
-	(United States) Benny Rapp								19			Wth				0
-	(Canada) Frank Weiss R								22		DNQ					0
-	(United States) Larry Dickson														22	0
-	(United States) Mike Hiss								29	DNQ	DNQ					0
-	(United States) Jim Hurtubise							DNQ								0
-	(New Zealand) Graham McRae							DNQ								0
-	(United States) Jan Opperman							DNQ								0
-	(United States) Ken Nichols														DNQ	0
-	(United States) Jack Owen														DNQ	0
-	(United States) Butch Harris														DNQ	0
-	(United States) Bill Simpson							Wth								0
-	(United States) Dan Murphy							Wth								0
-	(United States) Bob Nagel							Wth								0
-	(United States) Jigger Sirois							Wth								0
-	(United States) Jerry Sneva							Wth								0
Pos	Driver	QH1	QH2	R	PHX1	TRE1	WSE	INDY	MIL1	POC	MIS1	MIL2	MIS2	TRE2	PHX2	Pts
Pos	Driver	ONT			PHX1	TRE1	WSE	INDY	MIL1	POC	MIS1	MIL2	MIS2	TRE2	PHX2	Pts

Color	Result
Gold	Winner
Silver	2nd place
Bronze	3rd place
Green	4th & 5th place
Light Blue	6th-10th place
Dark Blue	Finished (Outside Top 10)
Purple	Did not finish (Ret)
Red	Did not qualify (DNQ)
Brown	Withdrawn (Wth)
Black	Disqualified (DSQ)
White	Did not start (DNS)
Blank	Did not participate (DNP)
Blank	Not competing

**In-line notation**
**Bold**	Pole position
Italics	Ran fastest race lap
*	Led most race laps
RY Rookie of the Year
R Rookie

== See also ==
- 1975 Indianapolis 500
