= 1974 USAC Championship Car season =

Open-wheel car racing season

- USAC National Championship Trail

Season
- Races: 14
- Start date: March 3
- End date: November 2

Awards
- National champion: (United States) Bobby Unser
- Indianapolis 500 winner: (United States) Johnny Rutherford

The 1974 USAC Championship Car season consisted of 14 races, beginning in Ontario, California on March 3 and concluding in Avondale, Arizona on November 2. The USAC National Champion was Bobby Unser and the Indianapolis 500 winner was Johnny Rutherford. Due to the events of the 1973 Indianapolis 500 significant improvements were made to the cars for safety concerns. Wings were reduced in size, and pop-off valves were added to the turbocharger plenums in order to reduce horsepower and curtail speeds.

== Entrants ==
(partial list)

Team	Chassis	Engine	Drivers	Rounds
(United States) A.J. Foyt Enterprises	Coyote	Foyt	(United States) A.J. Foyt	1, 3-14
(United States) All American Racers	Eagle	Offenhauser	(United States) Bobby Unser	1, 3-14
(United States) Richard Beith	Eagle	Offenhauser	(United States) Steve Krisiloff	2-3
(United States) Bob Fletcher	Eagle	Offenhauser	(United States) Jimmy Caruthers	2-14
(United States) Bob Fletcher	Eagle	Offenhauser	(United States) Jerry Grant	2-3, 5-8
(United States) Bob Fletcher	Eagle	Offenhauser	(United States) Pancho Carter	6, 8-14
(United States) Gerhardt	Eagle	Offenhauser	(United States) Jim McElreath	1, 3-8, 14
(United States) Jerry O"Connell Racing	Eagle	Offenhauser	(United States) Bill Vukovich II	1, 3-12, 14
(United States) Leader Card Racing	Eagle	Offenhauser	(United States) Mike Mosley	1, 3-12, 14
(United States) Lindsey Hopkins Racing	McLaren (1, 3-4, 9-10); Eagle (6-8, 11-14)	Offenhauser	(United States) Roger McCluskey	1, 3-4, 6-14
(United Kingdom) McLaren	McLaren	Offenhauser	(United States) Johnny Rutherford	2-14
(United States) Patrick Racing	Eagle	Offenhauser	(United States) Gordon Johncock	1, 3-14
(United States) Patrick Racing	Eagle	Offenhauser	(United States) Wally Dallenbach	1, 3-14
(United States) Patrick Racing	Eagle	Offenhauser	(United States) Steve Krisiloff	6-8, 10, 12-14
(United States) Team Penske	McLaren	Offenhauser	(United States) Gary Bettenhausen	2-8
(United States) Unlimited Racing Team	Eagle	Offenhauser	(United States) Lloyd Ruby	1, 3-12
(United States) Vel's Parnelli Jones Racing	Parnelli (2-3, 5, 7); Eagle (4, 6, 8-11, 14)	Offenhauser	(United States) Mario Andretti	2-11, 14
(United States) Vel's Parnelli Jones Racing	Eagle	Offenhauser	(United States) Al Unser	2-14
(United States) Vel's Parnelli Jones Racing	Eagle	Offenhauser	(United States) Joe Leonard	2-3

== Schedule and results ==
All races running on Oval/Speedway.

Rnd	Date	Race name	Track	Location	Pole position	Winning driver
1	March 3	California 500 Qualification Heat 1	Ontario Motor Speedway	Ontario, California	(United States) A. J. Foyt	(United States) A. J. Foyt
2	March 3	California 500 Qualification Heat 2	Ontario Motor Speedway	Ontario, California	(United States) Johnny Rutherford	(United States) Johnny Rutherford
3	March 10	California 500	Ontario Motor Speedway	Ontario, California	(United States) A. J. Foyt	(United States) Bobby Unser
4	March 17	Phoenix 150	Phoenix International Raceway	Avondale, Arizona	(United States) Al Unser	(United States) Mike Mosley
5	April 7	Trentonian 200	Trenton International Speedway	Trenton, New Jersey	(United States) Mario Andretti	(United States) Bobby Unser
6	May 26	International 500 Mile Sweepstakes	Indianapolis Motor Speedway	Speedway, Indiana	(United States) A. J. Foyt	(United States) Johnny Rutherford
7	June 9	Rex Mays Classic	Wisconsin State Fair Park Speedway	West Allis, Wisconsin	(United States) A. J. Foyt	(United States) Johnny Rutherford
8	June 30	Schaefer 500	Pocono International Raceway	Long Pond, Pennsylvania	(United States) Bobby Unser	(United States) Johnny Rutherford
9	July 21	Michigan 200	Michigan International Speedway	Brooklyn, Michigan	(United States) Bobby Unser	(United States) Bobby Unser
10	August 11	Tony Bettenhausen 200	Wisconsin State Fair Park Speedway	West Allis, Wisconsin	(United States) A. J. Foyt	(United States) Gordon Johncock
11	September 15	Norton 250	Michigan International Speedway	Brooklyn, Michigan	(United States) A. J. Foyt	(United States) Al Unser
12	September 22	Trenton 300 Heat #1	Trenton International Speedway	Trenton, New Jersey	(United States) A. J. Foyt	(United States) A. J. Foyt
13	September 22	Trenton 300 Heat #2	Trenton International Speedway	Trenton, New Jersey	(United States) A. J. Foyt	(United States) Bobby Unser
14	November 2	Bobby Ball 150	Phoenix International Raceway	Avondale, Arizona	(United States) Johnny Rutherford	(United States) Gordon Johncock

== Final points standings ==
Note 1: Jim Hurtubise, Skip Barber, David Hobbs, Sam Posey and Evan Noyes are not eligible for points.

Note 2: Jerry Grant did not obtain a USAC license until after the Ontario event, making him ineligible for points for the first two races of the year.

Pos	Driver	ONT			PHX1	TRE1	INDY	MIL1	POC	MIS1	MIL2	MIS2	TRE2		PHX2	Pts
Pos	Driver	QH1	QH2	R	PHX1	TRE1	INDY	MIL1	POC	MIS1	MIL2	MIS2	TRE2		PHX2	Pts
1	(United States) Bobby Unser	2		1	2	1	2	21	**5**	**1**	4	3	2	1	2	4870
2	(United States) Johnny Rutherford		**1**	27	7	6	1	1	1	4	5	9	4	7	**7**	3650
3	(United States) Gordon Johncock	14		26	4	2	4	16	3	3	1	14	11	2	1	3050
4	(United States) Al Unser		5	2	**18**	10	18	5	22	2	9	1	6	5	5	2430
5	(United States) Jimmy Caruthers		2	4	19	4	23	20	2	11	13	18	7	9	8	2065
6	(United States) Bill Vukovich II	10		21	8	3	3	3	8	5	10	19	18	DNS	6	1925
7	(United States) Lloyd Ruby	3		5	9	8	9	9	6	Wth	7	21				1580
8	(United States) A. J. Foyt	**1**		**30**	3	Wth	**15**	**6**	27	13	**2**	**24**	**1**	**4**	4	1510
9	(United States) Wally Dallenbach	7		6	6	13	30	15	10	6	3	11	3	11	18	1445
10	(United States) Steve Krisiloff		3	24			22	11	4		23		5	3	22	1130
11	(United States) Pancho Carter RY						7		15	9	12	2	9	6	9	1040
12	(United States) Mike Mosley	6		7	1	7	29	10	21	8	18	15	17	DNS		945
13	(United States) Jim McElreath	4		15	10	18	6	7	23						10	700
14	(United States) Mario Andretti		9	25	5	**9**	31	17	17	18	8	10			3	655
15	(United States) John Martin		6	9			11		16	12	16	6				600
16	(United States) Roger McCluskey	5		8	16		16	18	28	16	6	13	10	16	19	555
17	(United States) Tom Sneva	13		12	15	11	20	14	13	10	14	5	8	8	24	550
18	(United States) Mike Hiss			31			14			7		4				420
19	(United States) Jerry Grant		13	3		5	10	13								350
20	(United States) Bentley Warren	12		13	11	17	DNQ		7	17			Wth			340
21	(United States) Dick Simon	8		28	13		33	4	29	21	11				15	270
22	(United States) Gary Bettenhausen		11	20	14	Wth	32	2	31							260
23	(United States) Bob Harkey		15	17		14	8		26							250
24	(United States) Tom Bigelow	9		10			12		19	22					23	240
25	(Canada) Eldon Rasmussen					Wth	DNQ		9	20		22	DNS			200
26	(United States) Al Loquasto			18	12		DNQ		11			Wth	14	11	12	160
27	(United States) Dan Murphy R			Wth				19		23	22	7	13	15	DNQ	150
28	(United States) Karl Busson											8	12	13	21	140
29	(United States) George Snider		10	11	17		28		25			16				130
30	(United States) Joe Leonard		4	19												120
31	(United States) Salt Walther		8	22		12	17		20	DNS	Wth	Wth	15	10	20	115
32	(United States) Bill Simpson		14	14			13	8	18		19				11	105
33	(United States) Jerry Karl		7	29			19	12	32						16	75
34	(United States) Larry McCoy					16	DNQ		12	15	20	17				50
35	(United States) Mel Kenyon						DNQ					12				25
36	(United States) Lee Brayton	11		Wth			DNQ		14	24		20				20
37	(Canada) John Cannon		12	16	20	19	DNQ									10
-	(United Kingdom) David Hobbs						5									0
-	(United States) Sam Posey														13	0
-	(United States) John Hubbard							22	Wth	19	15	23	Wth	14		0
-	(United States) Sam Sessions						DNQ		30	14						0
-	(United States) Billy Scott R														14	0
-	(United States) Skip Barber R	15		32												0
-	(United States) Max Dudley					15										0
-	(United States) Benny Rapp R												16	DNS		0
-	(United States) Johnny Parsons			33			26		DNQ	Wth	17				17	0
-	(United States) Jan Opperman R						21	23	33							0
-	(United States) Mel Cornett R										21					0
-	(United States) Rick Muther			23			27		Wth							0
-	(United States) Jim Hurtubise						25		24							0
-	(United States) Larry Cannon						24		DNQ							0
-	(United States) Larry Rice R						Wth	24								0
-	(United States) Evan Noyes R														25	0
-	(United States) Jigger Sirois						DNQ									0
-	(United States) Denny Zimmerman						DNQ									0
-	(United States) Bruce Jacobi						DNQ									0
-	(United States) John Mahler						DNQ									0
-	(United States) Bill Puterbaugh						DNQ									0
-	(United States) Steve Durst			Wth												0
-	(United States) Brett Lunger														Wth	0
Pos	Driver	QH1	QH2	R	PHX1	TRE1	INDY	MIL1	POC	MIS1	MIL2	MIS2	TRE2		PHX2	Pts
Pos	Driver	ONT			PHX1	TRE1	INDY	MIL1	POC	MIS1	MIL2	MIS2	TRE2		PHX2	Pts

Color	Result
Gold	Winner
Silver	2nd place
Bronze	3rd place
Green	4th & 5th place
Light Blue	6th-10th place
Dark Blue	Finished (Outside Top 10)
Purple	Did not finish (Ret)
Red	Did not qualify (DNQ)
Brown	Withdrawn (Wth)
Black	Disqualified (DSQ)
White	Did not start (DNS)
Blank	Did not participate (DNP)
Blank	Not competing

**In-line notation**
**Bold**	Pole position
Italics	Ran fastest race lap
*	Led most race laps
RY Rookie of the Year
R Rookie

== See also ==
- 1974 Indianapolis 500
