= Larry McCoy =

Larry McCoy may refer to:

- Larry McCoy (umpire) (born 1941), former umpire in Major League Baseball
- Larry McCoy (racing driver) (1942–1979), American race car driver
