= Loquasto =

Loquasto is a surname. Notable people with the surname include:

- Al Loquasto (1940–1991), Italian-American racecar driver
- Santo Loquasto (born 1944), American production designer, scenic designer, and costume designer
