= California 500 =

Two races have been known as the California 500:

- California 500 (IndyCar) was a USAC and later CART sanctioned Indy car race held at Ontario Motor Speedway from 1970 to 1980
- Auto Club 500 is a NASCAR race held at the California Speedway which was called the "California 500 presented by NAPA" from 1997 to 1999
