= 1975 Indianapolis 500 =

American motor race

59th Indianapolis 500
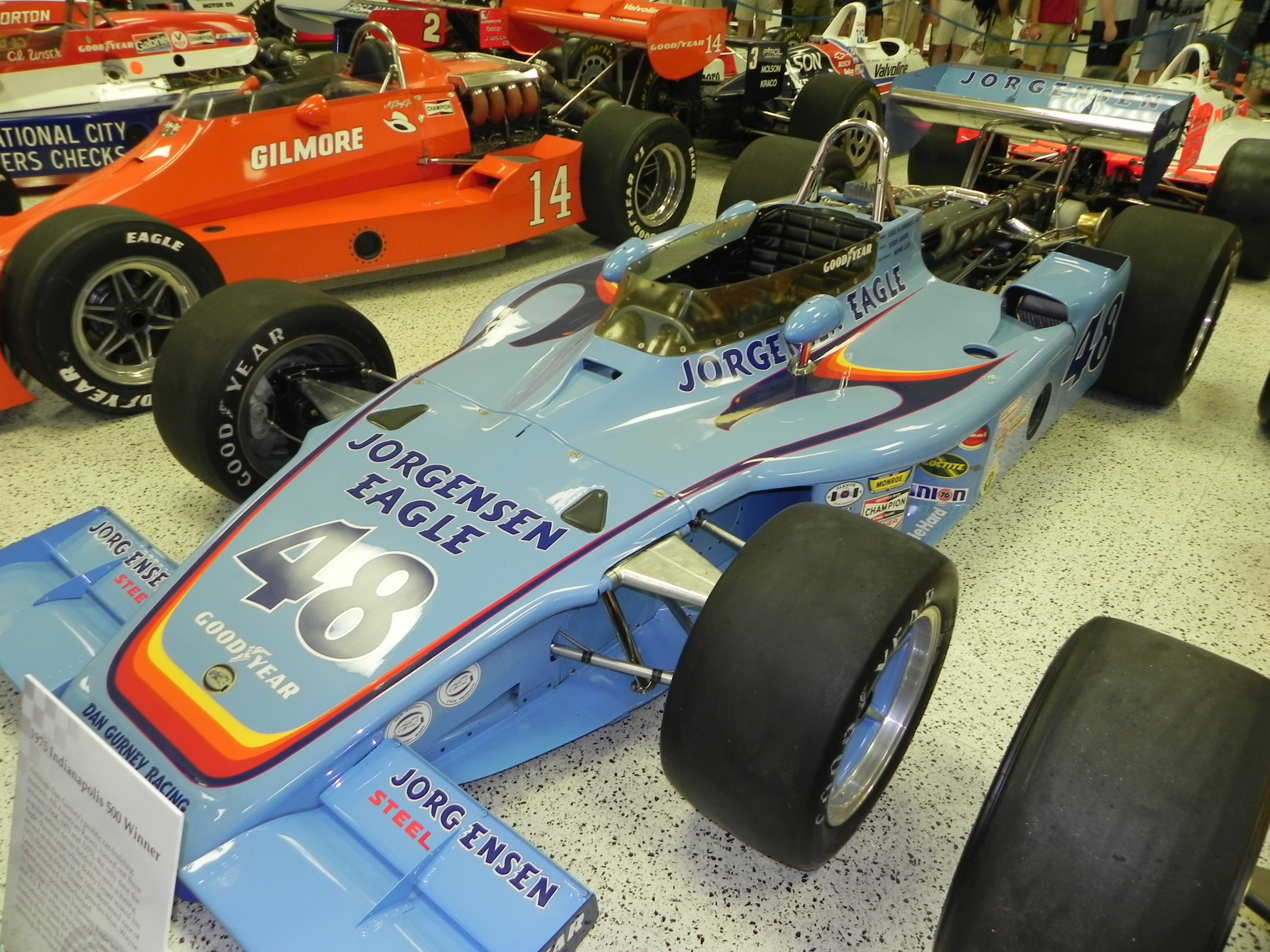

Indianapolis Motor Speedway

Indianapolis 500
- Sanctioning body: USAC
- Season: 1975 USAC Trail
- Date: May 25, 1975
- Winner: Bobby Unser (435 miles, rain)
- Winning team: All American Racers
- Winning Chief Mechanic: Wayne Leary
- Time of race: 2:54:55.08
- Average speed: 149.213 mph (240.135 km/h)
- Pole position: A. J. Foyt
- Pole speed: 193.976 mph (312.174 km/h)
- Fastest qualifier: Foyt
- Rookie of the Year: Bill Puterbaugh
- Most laps led: Wally Dallenbach (96)

Pre-race ceremonies
- National anthem: Purdue Band
- "Back Home Again in Indiana": Jim Nabors
- Starting command: Tony Hulman
- Pace car: Buick Century Custom V-8
- Pace car driver: James Garner
- Starter: Pat Vidan
- Estimated attendance: 300,000

Television in the United States
- Network: ABC
- Announcers: Keith Jackson and Jackie Stewart
- Nielsen ratings: 14.9 / 30

Chronology
Previous	Next
1974	1976

The 59th 500 Mile International Sweepstakes was held at the Indianapolis Motor Speedway in Speedway, Indiana on Sunday, May 25, 1975. A. J. Foyt started on the pole position and Bobby Unser won his second Indianapolis 500. Dan Gurney, one of the founders of All American Racers, who finished second as a driver himself in 1968–1969, won his first and only Indy 500 as a car owner. Gurney's Eagle chassis itself scored its third "500" win. The race was part of the 1975 USAC National Championship Trail.

On the 174th lap (435 miles), a heavy downpour pelted the Speedway, and officials immediately ended the race, just 26 laps short of the scheduled distance. Bobby Unser was leading the race at the red flag, and was declared the winner. Defending champion Johnny Rutherford was in second place, and pole-sitter A. J. Foyt came home third.

Tom Sneva survived a spectacular crash in turn two on lap 125. His car touched wheels with the car of Eldon Rasmussen, and flipped into the catch fence near the Turn Two Suites. The engine on Sneva's car ripped off in a huge fire-flash, and the car came to rest upright with Sneva trapped in the cockpit. Sneva miraculously suffered only minor injuries, and walked away from the wreck with assistance from the safety crews.

On the morning of the race, the Indianapolis Motor Speedway was ceremoniously designated to the National Register of Historic Places. In addition, the Hulman family celebrated thirty years of ownership of the facility.

== Race schedule ==
A year earlier (1974), the race was held in the wake of the energy crisis. USAC cut out a week of practice, and trimmed time trials from four days down to two days, in order to reduce energy consumption. These changes were well received by competitors and fans, and USAC decided to make most of the schedule changes permanent. However, time trials were restored back to four days for 1975 and beyond. In addition, the opening day of practice was pushed back 48 hours to Saturday (in 1974 Opening Day was not until Monday); although rain would wash out Saturday and cars would not take to the track until Sunday. This basic schedule would remain in place through 1997.

Race schedule — May, 1975
Sun	Mon	Tue	Wed	Thu	Fri	Sat
				1	2	3 Practice
4 Opening Day	5 Practice	6 Practice	7 Practice	8 Practice	9 Practice	10; Pole Day
11; Time Trials	12; Practice	13; Practice	14; Practice	15; Practice	16; Practice	17; Time Trials
18; Time Trials	19	20	21	22; Carb Day	23	24; Parade
25; Indy 500	26; Memorial Day	27	28	29	30	31

Color	Notes
Green	Practice
Dark Blue	Time trials
Silver	Race day
Red	Rained out*
Blank	No track activity

* Includes days where track
activity was significantly
limited due to rain

== Time trials ==
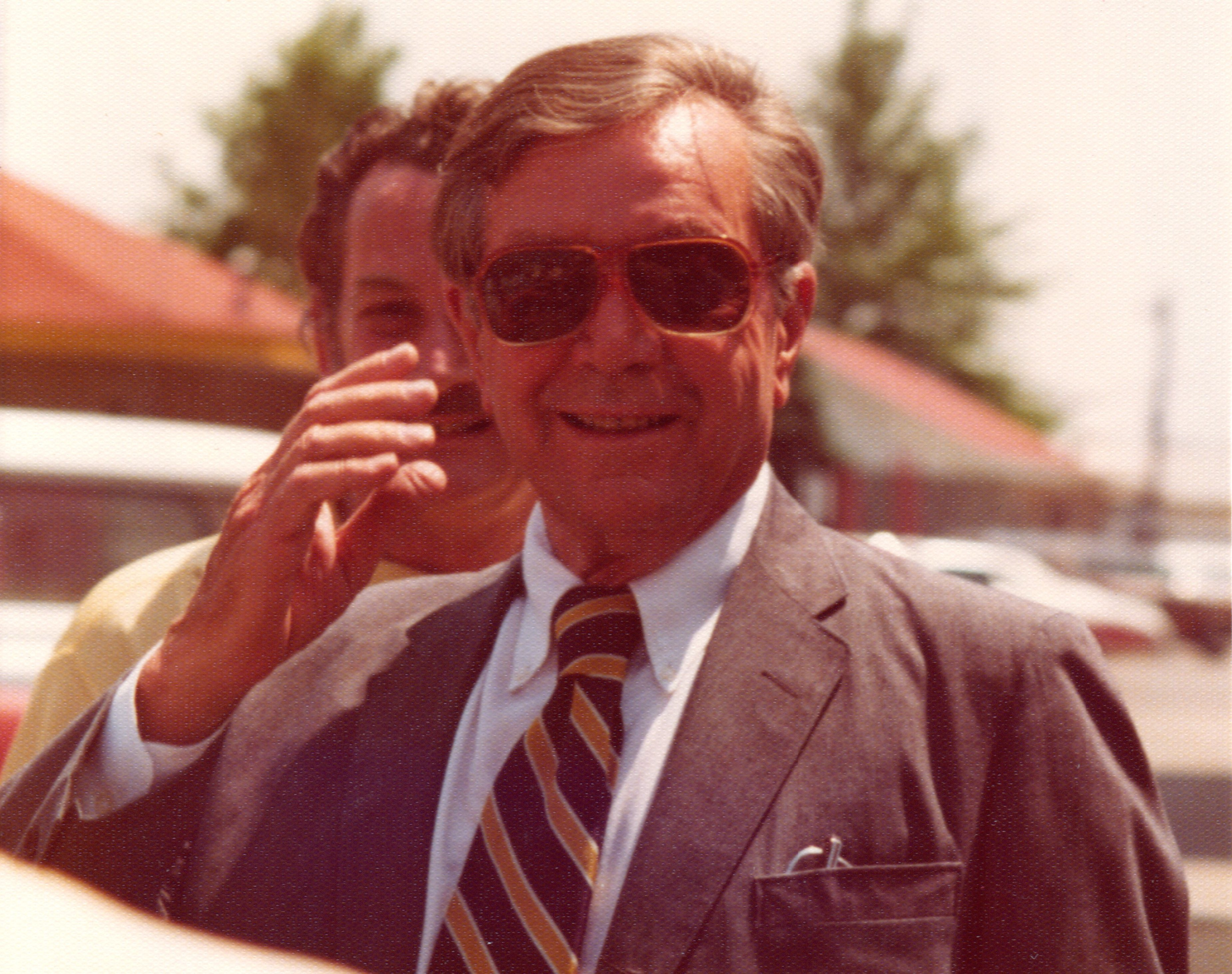
Tony Hulman, owner of the Indianapolis Motor Speedway, at the 1975 race.

For the second year in a row, pop-off valves were required during time trials. Turbocharger "boost" levels were set at 80 inHG maximum. Top speeds would be in the low to mid-190 mph range, and would not challenge the existing track record.

On Thursday May 8, Gordon Johncock showed himself as a favorite for the pole, completing a practice lap at 195.228 mph. Johncock consistently led the speed charts on four of the practice days. A. J. Foyt was close behind, topping the speed chart twice.

=== Pole Day – Saturday May 10 ===
Pole day dawned sunny and mild. Rookie Al Loquasto was the first driver out to qualify. Mike Mosley (187.833 mph) led the speeds early on, and was the fastest car through the first hour. At 12:15 p.m., Tom Sneva (190.094 mph) moved into the top spot.

About an hour later, Bobby Unser took to the track, and at 191.073 mph, bumped Sneva off the pole spot. Unser's speed did not last long, as Gordon Johncock, the next car out, then took over the provisional pole at 191.652 mph. The track remained mostly quiet over the next three hours, as drivers waited for cooler conditions.

Shortly after 4 p.m., the track action ramped up once again. A. J. Foyt blistered the track, with his first lap coming in at 195.313 mph. His four-lap average of 193.975 mph secured the pole position.

The final qualifying attempt of the afternoon was put in by Bill Puterbaugh. After six years of failure, Puterbaugh finally qualified for his first Indy 500. He pumped his fist as he returned to the pits, putting in the 15th-fastest speed of the day.

The day closed with the field filled to 22 cars. With Foyt, Johncock, and Bobby Unser qualifying 1-2-3, it was the first time in Indy history that former winners swept the front row.

=== Second Day – Sunday May 11 ===
After blowing his engine the day before, Wally Dallenbach returned to the track and qualified. His speed of 190.646 mph was the 4th-fastest overall, but as a second day qualifier, he would be forced to line up 21st.

A total of six cars qualified, and at the close of the first weekend of time trials, the field was filled to 28 cars.

=== Third Day – Saturday May 17 ===
With five spots open in the field, qualifying opened with Mike Hiss the first car to make an attempt. The field was quickly filled to 33 cars, and Lee Kunzman was the first car on the bubble.

Mario Andretti returned from Monaco, and put his car solidly in the field with a speed of 186.480 mph, easily the fastest driver of the day, bumping Kunzman in the process. At 12:18 p.m., Al Loquasto was now on the bubble.

Billy Scott made two attempts to bump his way in, but blew his engine on the first attempt, and waved off the second. No other cars made an attempt the rest of the day.

=== Bump Day – Sunday May 18 ===
On the final day of time trials, Al Loquasto still clung to the bubble spot. Eldon Rasmussen was the first car out to make an attempt. His first lap was over 183 mph, but the next two laps dropped off and the team waved off the run. Three hours later, Jim Hurtubise blew an engine after one slow lap, and Loquasto was still on the bubble after over 24 hours.

With about an hour left in the day, Loquasto survived yet two more attempts. At 5:18 p.m., with just under 42 minutes left in the day, Eldon Rasmussen made his second attempt. His speed of 181.910 mph finally bumped Loquasto. At 5:51 p.m., Tom Bigelow bumped Rick Muther from the field with a speed of 181.864 mph. That put Mike Hiss on the bubble spot with just over five minutes to go.

After an aborted run by Jim Hurtubise, Billy Scott hurriedly left the pit lane. He made it out onto the track just before the 6 o'clock gun that ended qualifying. Scott managed two laps over 180 mph, a little shy of Mike Hiss's 181.754 mph bubble speed. Scott's third lap dropped off to 179 mph, then on his final lap, he looped the car in turn four. Scott crashed into the outside wall almost head-on, but walked away not seriously injured. Scott's crash ended the session, and the field was set.

== Starting grid ==
Row	Inside		Middle		Outside	
1	14	(United States) A. J. Foyt W	20	(United States) Gordon Johncock W	48	(United States) Bobby Unser W
2	68	(United States) Tom Sneva	12	(United States) Mike Mosley	7	(United States) Lloyd Ruby
3	2	(United States) Johnny Rutherford W	6	(United States) Bill Vukovich II	77	(United States) Salt Walther
4	78	(United States) Jimmy Caruthers	4	(United States) Al Unser W	93	(United States) Johnny Parsons
5	16	(United States) Bobby Allison	73	(United States) Jerry Grant	83	(United States) Bill Puterbaugh R
6	89	(United States) John Martin	24	(United States) Bentley Warren	11	(United States) Pancho Carter
7	45	(United States) Gary Bettenhausen	30	(United States) Jerry Karl	40	(United States) Wally Dallenbach Sr.
8	15	(United States) Roger McCluskey	33	(United States) Bob Harkey	97	(United States) George Snider
9	36	(United States) Sammy Sessions	19	(United States) Sheldon Kinser R	21	(United States) Mario Andretti W
10	63	(United States) Larry McCoy R	98	(United States) Steve Krisiloff	44	(United States) Dick Simon
11	94	(United States) Mike Hiss	58	(Canada) Eldon Rasmussen R	17	(United States) Tom Bigelow

=== Alternates ===
- First alternate: Rick Muther (#46, #52) – Bumped
- Second alternate: Al Loquasto R (#38, #86) – Bumped

=== Failed to qualify ===
- Lee Kunzman (#52, #55) – Bumped
- Billy Scott R (#76) – Wrecked qualifying
- Jim Hurtubise (#52, #56) – Wave off
- Tom Bigelow (#17) – Wave off
- Graham McRae (#75) – Wave off
- Jan Opperman (#28, #46) – Incomplete run
- Larry Cannon (#59) – Wrecked in practice
- Chuck Gurney R (#23) – Wrecked in practice
- Jigger Sirois R (#52) – Wrecked in practice
- Jerry Sneva R (#37, #38) – Wrecked in practice
- George Follmer (#28, #52) – Blew engine in practice
- John Hubbard R (#53)
- Dan Murphy R (#25)
- Bob Nagel R
- Bill Simpson (#52, #98)

== Race summary ==
=== Start ===
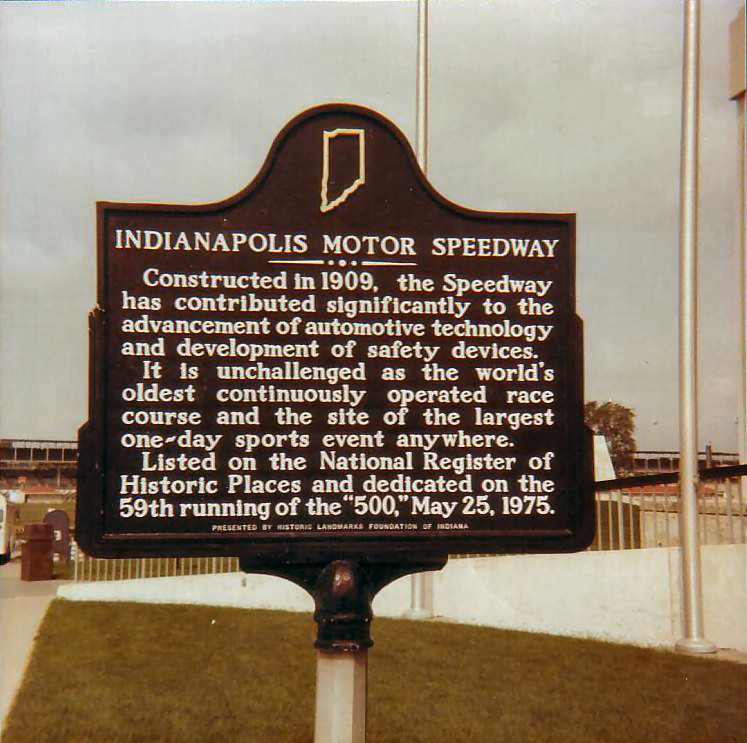
The Speedway was placed on the National Register of Historic Places

Gordon Johncock took the lead at the start and led the first 8 laps. But Johncock dropped out on lap 11 with an ignition failure. Also out early were Salt Walther (his Indy record third last place finish), and Lloyd Ruby, both out with engine problems.

Polesitter A. J. Foyt took the lead on lap 9. He briefly lost the lead for three laps during a pit stop on lap 22, but re-assumed the lead on lap 25, and led through lap 58. Salt Walther, who had dropped out, summoned his teammate Bob Harkey to the pits on lap 18. Walther climbed in the car and took over the machine for the remainder of the race. While the driver switch was apparently agreed upon before the race if the circumstances arose, Walther was criticized for making the switch under green, and not waiting for a caution period. The Harkey/Walther car fell a few laps down during the stop.

=== First half ===
The first yellow came out on lap 45 for Mike Hiss, who went high and brushed the wall in turn three.

During his first scheduled pit stop, Mario Andretti's car stalled several times trying to leave the pit lane. He lost several laps, but eventually rejoined the race. On the leaders' lap 68, Andretti spun out on the backstretch, and slammed into the inside wall near the entrance to turn three. He was out of the race after completing only 49 laps.

Wally Dallenbach took the lead for the first time on lap 59. He would lead a total of 96 laps, giving up the lead only during pit stops.

NASCAR regular Bobby Allison managed to lead one lap during a pit stop shuffle, in what would be his final start at Indy. Allison had decided to skip the World 600 at Charlotte and was the final noteworthy "cross over" driver to the Indy 500 during that era.

On the 73rd lap, A. J. Foyt passed Cliff Bergere (2,425) for first place all-time in total laps completed at the Indy 500.

=== Second half ===
During a sequence of green flag pit stops, A. J. Foyt appeared to run out of fuel going into turn 1. Coasting down the backstretch, seemingly without power, it appeared that Foyt was fiddling with his headrest or something behind the cockpit. Seconds later, he was back up to speed, and made it to the pits for fuel.

On lap 125, Tom Sneva approached the lapped car of Eldon Rasmussen in turn 1. As the two cars went side-by-side in turn two, they touched wheels and Sneva's car flipped up into a huge wreck. Sneva did a barrel-roll over the front nose of Rasmussen's car, becoming completely airborne and upside-down. The car rolled upright, and hit the outside wall and catch fence with the back end. The engine, gearbox, and rear of the car were ripped from the chassis, leaving a huge fire flash as the fuel and oil ignited in front of the Turn Two Suites. The cockpit section continued down the track, flipping at least twice, and came to rest on the track, right side up, then spun for several yards, coming to rest facing backwards. The engine and other parts scattered in different directions, and littered the track with debris bringing out the caution.

Sneva was conscious when the car came to rest, and immediately started unbuckling his seat belts trying to get out. The back of the car was still on fire, and he unknowingly lifted his visor, which singed his face with burns. He then put his hand down in a pool of methanol, which burned his fingers. His legs were trapped in the cockpit, and he was not able to get out of the car on his own. Rescue workers immediately arrived at the scene, and put out the remaining fires. A moment later, he was pulled from the wreck, and with assistance, walked to the ambulance.

Sneva did not suffer any serious bodily injuries, but was listed in serious condition with burns to his face and hands. After a couple days, Sneva's condition was quickly upgraded, and after a month, he was back racing.

After leading 96 laps, Wally Dallenbach dropped out with a blown piston on lap 162. That handed the lead to Johnny Rutherford, with Bobby Unser now in second.

Bobby Unser took the lead on lap 165. The skies were threatening, and rain was expected to move into the vicinity of the Speedway.

=== Finish ===
On lap 170, Gary Bettenhausen's right rear hub exploded and he lost the wheel down the mainstretch. Precariously riding on three wheels, he skillfully managed to keep the car mostly off the wall, and was able to park the car down in the infield of turn one. The caution light came on for the debris, and leader Bobby Unser ducked into the pits for a quick stop (fuel only). Second place Johnny Rutherford also made a pit stop. A minor fire broke out in Dick Simon's pit, but it was quickly doused.

Under the yellow, the skies became increasingly dark, and the rain that had been threatening finally was about to arrive.

Bobby Unser suddenly ducked into the pits for a second "splash-and-go" pit stop, topping off the tank in just 6 seconds. Unser's pit stop allowed third place A. J. Foyt to unlap himself back onto the lead lap. One lap later, the skies opened up, and it began to pour rain. It was lap 174 and Bobby Unser was leading, with Johnny Rutherford about a half lap behind in second. The track became flooded and many of the cars began hydroplaning and spinning out of control. The visibility dropped to near zero, as the heavy rain and the "rooster tails" made it difficult for the drivers to see. Fans began scurrying for cover. Bill Vukovich II's car skidded in turn 4, slid backwards to the inside of the turn and backed into the fencing, narrowly missing a photographer, but Vukovich somehow managed to get it back under control.

Starter Pat Vidan took out the red and checkered flag, and the race was halted and declared complete. The leaders had to precariously coast around to the finish line. Despite several wrecked cars blocking the track, Unser, Rutherford, and Foyt all managed to make it to the finish line cleanly. The race was officially called with Unser completing 174 laps (435 miles), just 26 laps short of the scheduled distance. Defending champion Johnny Rutherford followed with a second place, and pole-sitter Foyt finished third, still looking for the elusive fourth Indy win.

== Box score ==
Finish	Start	No	Name	Chassis	Engine	Qual	Laps	Time/Retired
1	3	48	(United States) Bobby Unser W	Eagle	Offenhauser	191.073	174	149.213 mph
2	7	2	(United States) Johnny Rutherford W	McLaren M16	Offenhauser	185.998	174	+1:04.05
3	1	14	(United States) A. J. Foyt W	Coyote	Foyt V-8	193.976	174	+1:48.66
4	18	11	(United States) Pancho Carter	Eagle	Offenhauser	183.449	169	Flagged (-5 laps)
5	22	15	(United States) Roger McCluskey	Riley	Offenhauser	183.964	167	Flagged (-7 laps)
6	8	6	(United States) Bill Vukovich II	Eagle	Offenhauser	185.845	166	Flagged (-8 laps)
7	15	83	(United States) Bill Puterbaugh R	Eagle	Offenhauser	183.833	165	Flagged (-9 laps)
8	24	97	(United States) George Snider	Eagle	Offenhauser	182.918	165	Flagged (-9 laps)
9	21	40	(United States) Wally Dallenbach Sr.	Wildcat	DGS	190.648	162	Piston
10	23	33	(United States) Bob Harkey (Salt Walther Laps 18–162)	McLaren M16	Offenhauser	183.786	162	Flagged (-12 laps)
11	29	98	(United States) Steve Krisiloff	Eagle	Offenhauser	182.408	162	Flagged (-12 laps)
12	26	19	(United States) Sheldon Kinser R	Kingfish	Offenhauser	182.389	161	Flagged (-13 laps)
13	20	30	(United States) Jerry Karl	Eagle	Chevrolet	182.537	161	Flagged (-13 laps)
14	10	78	(United States) Jimmy Caruthers	Eagle	Offenhauser	185.615	161	Flagged (-13 laps)
15	19	45	(United States) Gary Bettenhausen	Eagle	Offenhauser	182.611	158	Crash FS
16	11	4	(United States) Al Unser W	Eagle	Offenhauser	185.452	157	Rod
17	25	36	(United States) Sammy Sessions	Eagle	Offenhauser	182.751	155	Engine
18	33	17	(United States) Tom Bigelow	Vollstedt	Offenhauser	181.864	151	Magneto
19	12	93	(United States) Johnny Parsons	Eagle	Offenhauser	184.521	140	Transmission
20	14	73	(United States) Jerry Grant	Eagle	Offenhauser	184.266	137	Piston
21	30	44	(United States) Dick Simon	Eagle	Foyt V-8	181.891	133	Flagged (-31 laps)
22	4	68	(United States) Tom Sneva	McLaren M16	Offenhauser	190.094	125	Crash T2
23	17	24	(United States) Bentley Warren	Kingfish	Offenhauser	183.589	120	Flagged (-54 laps)
24	32	58	(Canada) Eldon Rasmussen R	Ras-Car	Foyt V-8	181.910	119	Valve
25	13	16	(United States) Bobby Allison	McLaren M16	Offenhauser	184.398	112	Gearbox
26	5	12	(United States) Mike Mosley	Eagle	Offenhauser	187.833	94	Engine
27	16	89	(United States) John Martin	McLaren M16	Offenhauser	183.655	61	Radiator
28	27	21	(United States) Mario Andretti W	Eagle	Offenhauser	186.480	49	Crash BS
29	31	94	(United States) Mike Hiss	Finley	Offenhauser	181.754	39	Crash T3
30	28	63	(United States) Larry McCoy R	Ras-Car	Offenhauser	182.760	24	Piston
31	2	20	(United States) Gordon Johncock W	Wildcat	DGS	191.653	11	Ignition
32	6	7	(United States) Lloyd Ruby	McLaren M16	Offenhauser	186.984	7	Piston
33	9	77	(United States) Salt Walther	McLaren M16	Offenhauser	185.701	2	Ignition

Note: Relief drivers in parentheses

W Former Indianapolis 500 winner

R Indianapolis 500 Rookie

All cars utilized Goodyear tires.

=== Race statistics ===
Lap Leaders
Laps	Leader
1–8	Gordon Johncock
9–21	A. J. Foyt
22–23	Johnny Rutherford
24	Bobby Allison
25–58	A. J. Foyt
59–69	Wally Dallenbach
70	A. J. Foyt
71–94	Wally Dallenbach
95–96	A. J. Foyt
97–120	Wally Dallenbach
121–123	A. J. Foyt
124	Bobby Unser
125–161	Wally Dallenbach
162–164	Johnny Rutherford
165–174	Bobby Unser

Total laps led
Driver	Laps
Wally Dallenbach	96
A. J. Foyt	53
Bobby Unser	11
Gordon Johncock	8
Johnny Rutherford	5
Bobby Allison	1

PACER Yellow Light Periods
5 for 34 laps (47 minutes 58 seconds)
Laps*	Reason
45–49	Mike Hiss crash in turn 3 (5:47)
68–71	Mario Andretti crash on backstretch (4:26)
97–101	Al Unser & Jerry Karl out of fuel on backstretch (6:15)
127–141	Tom Sneva crash in turn 2 (25:20)
170–174	Gary Bettenhausen lost wheel on mainstretch (6:10)
174	Red Flag due to rain, end of race
* – Approximate lap counts

=== Notes ===
- Race was given the red and checkered flags (signifying the race would end early) on lap 174 due to rain (caution begun on lap 171).
- This was the final race for Mary Catherine "Mom" Unser (mother of Jerry, Bobby, and Al), a fixture in the garage area who was famous for her spicy chili. She died on December 18, 1975.
- Jimmy Caruthers was diagnosed with cancer in late 1974, but after treatment went into remission, he was able to return to the cockpit for the 1975 race. He finished 14th, but eventually would succumb and died on October 26, five months after the race.

== Broadcasting ==
=== Radio ===
The race was carried live on the IMS Radio Network. Sid Collins served as chief announcer. The broadcast crew was largely familiar from 1974. The broadcast was carried on 1,200 affiliates including shortwave transmissions via AFN to Europe, Asia, Thailand, and many other locales. It was heard by over 100 million listeners worldwide. Collins had no celebrity guests in the booth during the race. But during the pre-race coverage, Collins interviewed Senator Barry Goldwater as well as Pete DePaolo, who was celebrating fifty years since his victory in 1925.

Indianapolis Motor Speedway Radio Network
Booth Announcers	Turn Reporters	Pit/garage reporters
Chief Announcer: Sid Collins; Driver expert: Fred Agabashian; Statistician: John DeCamp; Historian: Donald Davidson	Turn 1: Ron Carrell; Turn 2: Howdy Bell; Backstretch: Jerry Baker; Turn 3: Doug Zink; Turn 4: Jim Shelton	Paul Page (north pits/roving); Chuck Marlowe (north-center pits); Luke Walton (south-center pits); Lou Palmer (south pits); Bob Forbes (garages/hospital)

=== Television ===
The race was carried in the United States on ABC Sports on a same-day tape delay basis. Longtime Indy fixture Jim McKay sat out the broadcast as he was attending his Daughter's graduation and was replaced by announcer Keith Jackson. McKay was sent on other assignments in the 1975 season, including the 1975 Monaco Grand Prix. Jackie Stewart returned to serve as analyst after missing the 1974 race. Stewart covered both Monaco and Indianapolis. Sam Posey, who served as analyst in 1974, was moved to the pit area.

The broadcast has re-aired on ESPN Classic since May 2011.

ABC Television
Booth Announcers	Pit/garage reporters
Host: Chris Schenkel; Announcer: Keith Jackson; Color: Jackie Stewart	Chris Economaki; Sam Posey

== Notes ==
=== See also ===
- 1975 USAC Championship Car season

=== Works cited ===
- 1975 Indianapolis 500 Press Information – Official Track Report
- Indianapolis 500 History: Race & All-Time Stats – Official Site
- 1975 Indianapolis 500 at RacingReference.info
- 1975 Indianapolis 500 Radio Broadcast, Indianapolis Motor Speedway Radio Network

1974 Indianapolis 500; Johnny Rutherford	1975 Indianapolis 500; Bobby Unser	1976 Indianapolis 500; Johnny Rutherford
