= Ontario 500 =

Ontario 500 may refer to:

- California 500: A former USAC/CART race held at Ontario Motor Speedway
- Los Angeles Times 500: A former NASCAR Winston Cup Series race held at Ontario Motor Speedway
