= Triple Crown (IndyCar) =

Motorsport achievement

The Triple Crown is a "championship" consisting of three 500 Mile Super Speedway races on the IndyCar calendar. Traditionally, the crown jewel races were events at Indianapolis Motor Speedway, Pocono Raceway, and a third race at either Ontario Motor Speedway, Michigan International Speedway, or Auto Club Speedway. In some years a driver would be recognized as a "Triple Crown Champion" if they were to score the most points in the three races; Al Unser being the only driver to win all three 500 mile races during the 1978 IndyCar Season. Even though three super speedways and three 500 mile races have been featured in many seasons, only in 1971–1989 and 2013–2015 were "Triple Crowns" recognized.

== History ==
The Triple Crown concept was first suggested by Pocono Raceway General Manager Bill Marvel in 1970. Hoping to replicate the success of horse racing's Triple Crown, Pocono promoted their debut race in 1971 as joining an elite group of three 500-mile IndyCar races. Other "Crown Jewel" races included the Indianapolis 500 and the California 500 at Ontario Motor Speedway which debuted in 1970. The driver that scored the most points in the three 500 mile races would be presented with a diamond-studded gold ring. Joe Leonard won the first two Triple Crown championships in 1971 and 1972.

By 1974, several drivers criticized USAC over their lack of promotion for the Triple Crown. Shortly after Secretariat won the similar prize in horse racing, it was lamented that auto racing's Triple Crown was not similarly embraced. After Marvel left his position at Pocono, promotion of the Crown was reduced and USAC neglected to even mention Roger McCluskey won the 1973 Crown in their media guide.

"The Triple Crown was one man's dream," Mario Andretti said in June 1974. "Since Bill Marvel isn't connected here anymore, the whole thing died. It has some definite meaning, but it has to be talked about."

"It is a good publicity thing," Mark Donohue said, "but it has to be promoted. Right now everybody is just trying to win the race at hand." In June 1974, Philadelphia Daily News writer Bill Fleischman wrote, "A few years ago, Joe Leonard was honored at a dinner in Philadelphia as the first Triple Crown Winner. Leonard said he hoped his sport's Triple Crown would soon be as prestigious as horse racing's established salute. It hasn't happened. And it won't until auto racing cares enough to promote what could be an exciting attention getter."

Between 1975 and 1980, the prize was renamed the Olsonite Triple Crown and carried a $1,500 prize for the champion and an annual trophy.

In 1978, Al Unser became the first and only driver to win all three Crown Jewel races in one season. Ontario Motor Speedway closed in 1980 and its spot in the Triple Crown was replaced with a new 500 Mile race at Michigan International Speedway. In 1982, Gordon Johncock won the first two legs of the Triple Crown and looked to become the second driver to sweep the crown jewels. While running second at Pocono with six laps remaining, Johncock broke a gearbox and dashed his hopes to win all three races.

In March 1983, Domino's Pizza became the title sponsor of the Domino's Pizza CART Triple Crown Award. A $1 million prize was offered should any driver win all three Triple Crown races in one season. In addition, whichever driver scored the most points in the Triple Crown would win $10,000 and a trophy.

Domino's sponsorship of the award expired at the end of 1986 and the annual crowning of a champion based on points was discontinued. Pocono left the IndyCar schedule after 1989 and the Triple Crown promotion was dropped entirely. The last Michigan 500 was held in 2001 which made Indianapolis the last 500 mile race for several years.

In 2012, a 500-mile race at Auto Club Speedway was held as the season-ending race. In October 2012, it was announced that Pocono would return to the schedule in 2013. The Triple Crown promotion returned as well. "If you're gonna bring history back, the one thing that the fans wanted to see was the Triple Crown," IndyCar CEO Randy Bernard said. "Ever since I started three years ago, that was one of the big things they kept telling us."

Like the promotion in the 1980s, the Triple Crown revival carried cash bonuses, sponsored by Fuzzy's Ultra Premium Vodka. If a driver could win all three races, they would earn a $1 million bonus. $250,000 was offered if a driver could win 2 out of 3 races. It became known as the Fuzzy's Vodka Triple Crown.

In 2014, the Triple Crown races awarded double points in the IndyCar standings. Following repeated schedule changes and decreased attendance, the California 500 left the IndyCar schedule after 2015 and the Triple Crown promotion was dropped once again.

== Triple Crown seasons ==
Season	Indianapolis	Pocono	Ontario
1971 USAC Championship Car season	(United States) Al Unser	(United States) Mark Donohue	(United States) Joe Leonard
1972 USAC Championship Car season	(United States) Mark Donohue	(United States) Joe Leonard	(United States) Roger McCluskey
1973 USAC Championship Car season	(United States) Gordon Johncock	(United States) A. J. Foyt	(United States) Wally Dallenbach Sr.
1974 USAC Championship Car season	(United States) Johnny Rutherford	(United States) Johnny Rutherford	(United States) Bobby Unser
1975 USAC Championship Car season	(United States) Bobby Unser	(United States) A. J. Foyt	(United States) A. J. Foyt
1976 USAC Championship Car season	(United States) Johnny Rutherford	(United States) Al Unser	(United States) Bobby Unser
1977 USAC Championship Car season	(United States) A. J. Foyt	(United States) Tom Sneva	(United States) Al Unser
1978 USAC Championship Car season	(United States) Al Unser	(United States) Al Unser	(United States) Al Unser
1979 USAC Championship Car season	(United States) Rick Mears	(United States) A. J. Foyt	(United States) A. J. Foyt
1980 USAC Championship Car season	(United States) Johnny Rutherford	(United States) Bobby Unser	(United States) Johnny Rutherford
Season	Indianapolis	Pocono	Michigan
1981 USAC/1981 CART PPG	(United States) Bobby Unser	(United States) A. J. Foyt	(United States) Pancho Carter
1982 CART PPG Indy Car World Series	(United States) Gordon Johncock	(United States) Rick Mears	(United States) Gordon Johncock
1983 CART PPG Indy Car World Series	(United States) Tom Sneva	(Italy) Teo Fabi	(United States) John Paul Jr.
1984 CART PPG Indy Car World Series	(United States) Rick Mears	(United States) Danny Sullivan	(United States) Mario Andretti
1985 CART PPG Indy Car World Series	(United States) Danny Sullivan	(United States) Rick Mears	(Brazil) Emerson Fittipaldi
1986 CART PPG Indy Car World Series	(United States) Bobby Rahal	(United States) Mario Andretti	(United States) Johnny Rutherford
1987 CART PPG Indy Car World Series	(United States) Al Unser	(United States) Rick Mears	(United States) Michael Andretti
1988 CART PPG Indy Car World Series	(United States) Rick Mears	(United States) Bobby Rahal	(United States) Danny Sullivan
1989 CART PPG Indy Car World Series	(Brazil) Emerson Fittipaldi	(United States) Danny Sullivan	(United States) Michael Andretti
1990–2012 No Triple Crown recognized
Season	Indianapolis	Pocono	Fontana
2013 IZOD IndyCar Series	(Brazil) Tony Kanaan	(New Zealand) Scott Dixon	(Australia) Will Power
2014 Verizon IndyCar Series	(United States) Ryan Hunter-Reay	(Colombia) Juan Pablo Montoya	(Brazil) Tony Kanaan
Season	Indianapolis	Fontana	Pocono
2015 Verizon IndyCar Series	(Colombia) Juan Pablo Montoya	(United States) Graham Rahal	(United States) Ryan Hunter-Reay

== Triple Crown points champions ==
When Pocono and Fontana were on the schedule together from 2013 to 2015, IndyCar did not officially announce a Triple Crown points champion.

Season	Champion
1971 USAC Championship Car season	(United States) Joe Leonard
1972 USAC Championship Car season	(United States) Joe Leonard
1973 USAC Championship Car season	(United States) Roger McCluskey
1974 USAC Championship Car season	(United States) Bobby Unser
1975 USAC Championship Car season	(United States) A. J. Foyt
1976 USAC Championship Car season	(United States) Johnny Rutherford
1977 USAC Championship Car season	(United States) Tom Sneva
1978 USAC Championship Car season	(United States) Al Unser
1979 USAC Championship Car season	(United States) A. J. Foyt
1980 USAC Championship Car season	(United States) Johnny Rutherford
1981 USAC/1981 CART PPG	Not awarded due to USAC-CART split
1982 CART PPG Indy Car World Series	(United States) Gordon Johncock
1983 CART PPG Indy Car World Series	(United States) Rick Mears
1984 CART PPG Indy Car World Series	(United States) Rick Mears
1985 CART PPG Indy Car World Series	(United States) Al Unser
1986 CART PPG Indy Car World Series	(United States) Kevin Cogan

== See also ==
- Triple Crown of Motorsport
