= Mike Hiss =

American racing driver (1941–2018)

Mike Hiss (July 7, 1941 – December 19, 2018) was an American driver in the USAC Championship Car series. He raced in the 1972–1976 seasons, with 28 career starts, including the Indianapolis 500 in 1972–1975. He finished in the top-ten 13 times, with his best finish in second position in 1972 at Ontario. His seventh-place finish at Indy in 1972 earned him the title of Rookie of the Year.

Hiss was the centerfold of the first preview issue of Playgirl published in January 1973. He was briefly married to Arlene Hiss, the first woman to start a USAC Champ Car event.

== Complete motorsports results ==
=== American Open-Wheel racing results ===
(key) (Races in bold indicate pole position, races in italics indicate fastest race lap)

==== SCCA National Championship Runoffs ====
Year	Track	Car	Engine	Class	Finish	Start	Status
1966	Riverside	Triumph TR3	Triumph	F Production	3		Running
1970	Road Atlanta	Lola T200	Ford	Formula Ford	5	8	Running

==== Indy 500 results ====
Year	Chassis	Engine	Start	Finish
1972	Eagle	Offy	25	7
1973	Eagle	Offy	26	17
1974	McLaren	Offy	3	14
1975	Finley	Offy	31	29
1976	Riley	Offy	DNQ	
1978	Penske	Cosworth	8	DNS †

† Qualified Car for Mario Andretti who was driving Formula 1

==== USAC Champ Car results ====
(key) (Races in bold indicate pole position)

Year	Team	1	2	3	4	5	6	7	8	9	10	11	12	13	14	15	16	17	18	Rank	Points
1972	Page Racing Enterprises	PHX; 10	TRE; 7	INDY; 7	MIL; 13	MCH; 26	POC; 6	MIL		TRE; 14	PHX; DNQ									6th	1665
1972	Penske Racing								ONT; 2											6th	1665
1973	Don Gerhardt	TWS; 22	TRE; 14	TRE; 13	INDY; 17	MIL; 10	POC; 6	MCH; 25	MIL; 5	ONT; 3	ONT	ONT; 27	MCH; 9	MCH; 3	TRE; 21	TWS; 11	PHX			14th	1050
1974	Eisenhour-Brayton Racing Team	ONT	ONT	ONT; 31	PHX	TRE														18th	420
1974	Penske Racing						INDY; 14	MIL	POC	MCH; 7	MIL	MCH; 4	TRE	TRE	PHX					18th	420
1975	Vatis Racing	ONT	ONT	ONT	PHX	TRE	INDY; 29	MIL	POC	MCH	MIL	MCH	TRE	PHX						NC	0
1976	Hopkins	PHX	TRE	INDY; DNQ	MIL	POC	MCH	TWS	TRE	MIL										NC	0
1976	Ralph Wilke										ONT; 19	MCH	TWS	PHX						NC	0
1978	Penske Racing	PHX	ONT	TWS	TRE	INDY; Rpl	MOS	MIL	POC	MCH	ATL	TWS	MIL	ONT	MCH	TRE	SIL	BRH	PHX	NC	0

=== NASCAR Winston Cup Series results ===
(key)

NASCAR Winston Cup Series results
Year	Team	No.	Make	1	2	3	4	5	6	7	8	9	10	11	12	13	14	15	16	17	18	19	20	21	22	23	24	25	26	27	28	29	30	NWCC	Pts
1976	Black Gold Oil	94	Chevrolet	RSD	DAY	CAR	RCH	BRI	ATL	NWS	DAR	MAR	TAL	NSV	DOV	CLT	RSD	MCH	DAY	NSV	POC	TAL	MCH	BRI	DAR	RCH	DOV	MAR	NWS	CLT	CAR	ATL	ONT; 22	NC	0
1977	Black Gold	94	Chevrolet	RSD; DNQ	DAY	RCH	CAR	ATL	NWS	DAR	BRI	MAR	TAL	NSV	DOV	CLT	RSD	MCH	DAY	NSV	POC	TAL	MCH	BRI	DAR	RCH	DOV	MAR	NWS	CLT	CAR	ATL	ONT	NC	0

Sporting positions
Preceded by Denny Zimmerman	Indianapolis 500; Rookie of the Year; 1972	Succeeded by Graham McRae
