= Bill Puterbaugh =

American racing driver

- Born: June 6, 1936
- Died: October 9, 2017 (aged 81); Brownsburg, Indiana, United States

Bill Puterbaugh (June 6, 1936 – October 9, 2017) was an American racing driver in the USAC Championship Car series. He raced in the 1967–1971, the 1975–1977, and the 1979 seasons, with 31 career starts, including the 1975-1977 Indianapolis 500. He finished in the top-ten 11 times, with his best finish in sixth position in 1968 at Springfield and in 1969 at Sacramento. His seventh-place finish in the 1975 Indianapolis 500 earned him Rookie of the Year.

Puterbaugh died at home surrounded by his family in Brownsburg, Indiana, on October 9, 2017, at the age of 81.

== USAC Championship Car season ==
Year	1	2	3	4	5	6	7	8	9	10	11	12	13	14	15	16	17	18	19	20	21	22	23	24	25	26	27	28	Rank	Pts.
1967	PHX	TRE	INDY	MIL	LAN	PIP	MOS	MOS	IRP	LAN	MTR	MTR	SPR; DNQ	MIL	DQS; 13	ISF; 15	TRE	SAC; 15	HAN	PHX	RIV								-	0
1968	HAN	LVG	PHX	TRE	INDY; DNQ	MIL; 17	MOS	MOS	LAN; 8	PIP	CDR	NAZ; 9	IRP	IRP	LAN; 12	LAN; 9	MTR	MTR	SPR; 6	MIL	DQS; 11	ISF	TRE	SAC	MIC	HAN	PHX	RIV	29th	265
1969	PHX	HAN	INDY	MIL	LAN	PIP	CDR	NAZ	TRE	IRP	IRP	MIL	SPR; 9	DIS	DQS; 15	ISF; 16	BRN	BRN	TRE; 16	SAC; 6	KEN	KEN	PHX; 16	RIV					37th	120
1970	PHX	SON	TRE	INDY; DNQ	MIL	LAN	CDR	MIC	IRP	SPR; DNS	MIL	ONT; DNQ	DQS; DNQ	ISF	SED; 16	TRE; 17	SAC; DNP	PHX											-	0
1971	RAF	RAF	PHX	TRE	INDY; DNQ	MIL	POC; 14	MIC; DNQ	MIL; 13	ONT	TRE; 19	PHX																	-	0
1972	PHX	TRE	INDY; DNQ	MIL	MIC	POC	MIL	ONT	TRE	PHX																			-	0
1973	TXS	TRE	TRE	INDY; DNQ	MIL	POC	MIC	MIL	ONT	ONT	ONT	MIC	MIC	TRE	TXS	PHX													-	0
1974	ONT	ONT	ONT	PHX	TRE	INDY; DNQ	MIL	POC	MIC	MIL	MIC	TRE	TRE	PHX															-	0
1975	ONT	ONT	ONT	PHX	TRE	INDY; 7	MIL	POC; 9	MIC	MIL	MIC	TRE	PHX; 9																16th	560
1976	PHX	TRE	INDY; 22	MIL	POC; DNQ	MIC	TXS	TRE	MIL	ONT; 7	MIC	TXS	PHX; 8																17th	375
1977	ONT	PHX	TXS	TRE	INDY; 12	MIL	POC	MOS	MIC	TXS	MIL	ONT	MIC	PHX															39th	50
1979	ONT	TXS	INDY; DNQ	MIL; 19	POC	TXS	MIL; 13																						30th	10
1980	ONT	INDY; DNQ	MIL	POC	MDO																								-	0
1981-82	INDY	POC	SPR	DQS; DNS	ISF; DNQ	INDY																							-	0
1982-83	SPR	DQS	NAZ	INDY; DNP																									-	0
1983-84	DQS	INDY; DNP																											-	0

== Indianapolis 500 results ==
Year	Chassis	Engine	Start	Finish
1968	Gerhardt	Ford	Failed to Qualify	
1970	Watson	Offy	Failed to Qualify	
1971	Gerhardt	Offy	Practice Crash	
1972	Curtis	Offy	Failed to Qualify	
1973	Coyote	Offy	Failed to Qualify	
1974	Lola	Offy	Failed to Qualify	
1975	Eagle	Offy	15th	7th
1976	Eagle	Offy	18th	22nd
1977	Eagle	Offy	28th	12th
1979	Cicada	Offy	Failed to Qualify	

Sporting positions
Preceded by Pancho Carter	Indianapolis 500; Rookie of the Year; 1975	Succeeded by Vern Schuppan
