= Billy Scott (racing driver) =

American racing driver

Bill Scott
- Born: October 10, 1948; San Bernardino, California, U.S.
- Died: April 28, 2017 (aged 68)

NASCAR Cup Series career
- 1 race run over 1 year
- First race: 1970 Falstaff 400 (Riverside)
Wins	Top tens	Poles
0	0	0
- Statistics up to date as of April 20, 2013.

Bill Scott (October 10, 1948 – April 28, 2017 San Bernardino, California), was an American race car driver. Scott competed in a number of disciplines, including open wheel car, stock car, and drag racing. In 1974–1976, he competed in four races in the USAC Championship Car series, including the 1976 Indianapolis 500 where he finished 23rd in a car owned by Warner W. Hodgdon and named the Spirit of Public Enterprise.

== Indianapolis 500 results ==
Year	Chassis	Engine	Start	Finish
1975	Eagle	Offy	Qualifying Crash	
1976	Eagle	Offy	21st	23rd
1979	Eagle	Offy	Failed to Qualify	
1982	Lightning	Donovan	Failed to Qualify	
