= Bob Harkey =

American racing driver

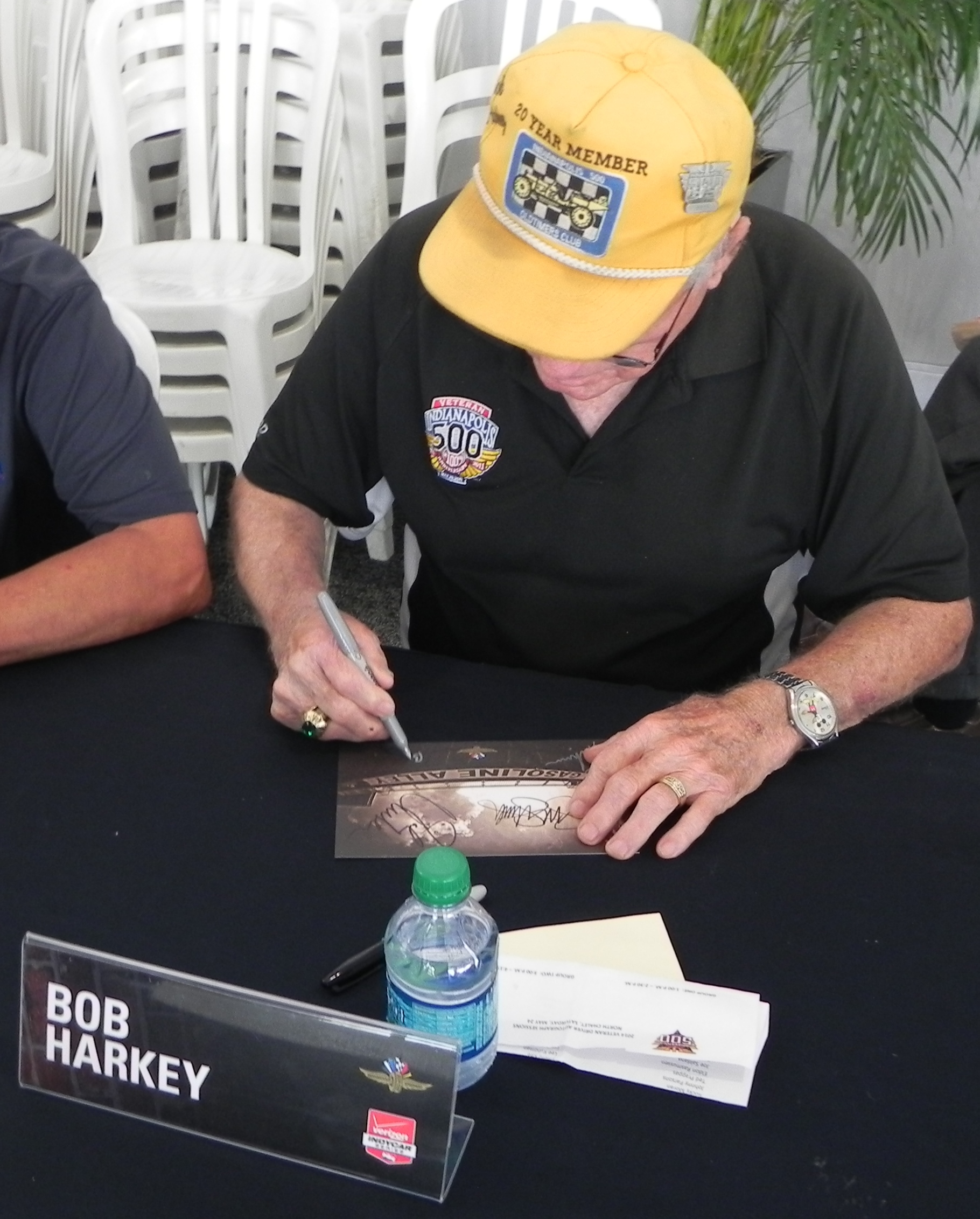
- Harkey at the 2014 Indianapolis 500
- Born: 23 June 1930; Charlotte, North Carolina, United States
- Died: 16 January 2016 (aged 85); Indianapolis, Indiana, United States

Bob Harkey (June 23, 1930 – January 16, 2016) was an American driver in the USAC Championship Car series from Charlotte, North Carolina. He raced in the 1963–1979 seasons, with 85 career starts, including the Indianapolis 500 in 1964, 1971 and 1973–1976. He finished in the top-ten 23 times, with his best finish in fourth position in 1964 at Trenton.

Harkey made one NASCAR start, which also happened to be the first race at Daytona International Speedway. Driving a Chevrolet for Buck Baker, Harkey placed tenth in the 1959 NASCAR Convertible Division race supporting the inaugural Daytona 500. He also entered the 500 but withdrew.

Harkey's first experiences with speed came as the driver of a decoy car during moonshine runs. He worked as a stunt driver for movies such as Thunder Road, Speedway and Winning. Harkey was also an accomplished stunt pilot and wing walker. He owned a Stearman and an AT-6, with which he taught fellow drivers such as Johnny Rutherford to fly.

Harkey also trained as a boxer, and once fought eventual world heavyweight champion Floyd Patterson in the Golden Gloves.

For many years, Harkey worked with Champion Spark Plugs' safety program.

On January 16, 2016, Harkey died in Indianapolis at the age of 85.

== Indianapolis 500 results ==
Year	Car	Start	Qual	Rank	Finish	Laps	Led	Retired
1964	4	27	151.573	19	8	197	0	Flagged
1971	44	33	169.197	33	22	151	0	Flagged
1973	28	31	189.734	29	29	12	0	Seized Engine
1974	79	31	176.687	31	8	189	0	Flagged
1975	33	23	183.786	19	10	162	0	Flagged *
1976	96	28	181.141	32	20	97	0	Flagged
Totals						808	0	

Starts	6
Poles	0
Front Row	0
Wins	0
Top 5	0
Top 10	3
Retired	1

- 1975: Relieved by Salt Walther (laps 18–162)
