= Jerry Karl =

American racing driver (1941–2008)

- Born: 29 April 1941; Jamaica, Queens, New York, U.S.
- Died: 16 February 2008 (aged 66); Baltimore, Maryland, U.S.

Jerry Karl (April 29, 1941, Jamaica, Queens, New York - February 16, 2008, Baltimore, Maryland), was an American driver in the USAC and CART Championship Car series.

== Biography ==
Starting out in midget car racing and sprint car racing, Karl made his Champ Car debut in 1969 and qualified for his first Indy 500 in 1973 driving an Eagle chassis powered by a twin-turbo Chevrolet V8 engine fielded by legendary car owner Smokey Yunick. He raced for another team in 1974, but returned to drive for Yunick in 1974 and finished 13th at Indy.

In 1980, Karl entered the CART series and began modifying his own McLaren chassis that he dubbed the McLaren-Karl. In the final race of the 1980 season at Phoenix International Raceway, Karl and his chassis ran at the front of the field in second place until engine trouble dropped him back to 9th.

In total, Karl raced in the 1969-1984 seasons, with 74 combined career starts, including the 1973–1975, 1978, and 1980-1981 Indianapolis 500. He finished in the top-ten eight times. His best finish was in seventh position in 1974 at the Ontario Motor Speedway in a 100-miler.

== Later years ==
Karl later owned a racing products distributor in Wellsville, Pennsylvania.

== Death ==
Karl died at the age of 66 due to a road car crash in Baltimore on February 16, 2008.

== Indianapolis 500 results ==
Year	Chassis	Engine	Start	Finish
1970	Gerhardt	Chevrolet	Failed to Qualify	
1971	Gerhardt	Chevrolet	Failed to Qualify	
1972	Gerhardt	Offy	Failed to Qualify	
1973	Eagle	Chevrolet	28th	26th
1974	Eagle	Offy	19th	19th
1975	Eagle	Chevrolet	20th	13th
1976	Eagle	Offy	Failed to Qualify	
1977	Vollstedt	Offy	Failed to Qualify	
1978	McLaren	Offy	28th	14th
1979	McLaren	Offy	Failed to Qualify	
1980	McLaren	Chevrolet	28th	21st
1981	McLaren	Chevrolet	31st	15th
1982	Purcell	Chevrolet	Failed to Qualify	
1983	Wildcat	Cosworth	Failed to Qualify	
1984	Penske	Cosworth	Practice Crash	
1985	March	Cosworth	Failed to Qualify	
