= Jerry Grant =

American racing driver (1935–2012)

- Born: Gerald Wayne Grant; January 23, 1935 Seattle, Washington, U.S.
- Died: August 12, 2012 (aged 77) Orange, California, U.S.

Champ Car career
- 52 races run over 14 years
- Years active: 1964–1977
- Best finish: 11th – 1974
- First race: 1965 Indianapolis 500 (Indianapolis)
- Last race: 1977 Tony Bettenhausen 200 (Milwaukee)
Wins	Podiums	Poles
0	1	1

NASCAR Cup Series career
- 19 races run over 6 years
- Best finish: 43rd (1968)
- First race: 1965 Motor Trend 500 (Riverside)
- Last race: 1974 Winston Western 500 (Riverside)
Wins	Top tens	Poles
0	4	0

Gerald Wayne Grant (January 23, 1935 – August 12, 2012) was a driver in the USAC Championship Car series. Born in Seattle, he began racing sports cars in Northern California in the early 1960s. He raced in the 1965-1977 seasons, with 54 career starts, including the Indianapolis 500 in 1965-1968, 1970 and 1972-1976. He finished in the top-ten 13 times, with his best finish in third position in 1974 at Ontario.

Grant is best remembered for his bad luck at the 1972 Indianapolis 500 that cost him first victory and then second place. He was leading the race comfortably over Mark Donohue when a punctured tire forced him to pit with 12 laps to go. In later interviews, Grant said that he had adopted a higher line for improved handling, and this may have left him vulnerable to debris on the outside of the racing line. As Donohue went past into the lead, Grant overshot his pit and stopped at his teammate Bobby Unser's. His mechanics changed the tire in Unser's pit, and also refueled the car—from Unser's pit tank. Grant returned to the track and finished second to Donohue. The team of third-place finisher Al Unser filed a protest, saying that Grant had used fuel from another driver's supply. The protest was upheld and Grant's final 12 laps were not counted, dropping him from 2nd to 12th.

Grant was the first USAC driver to break 200 miles per hour (320 km/h). He accomplished the feat in qualifying at the Ontario Motor Speedway on September 3, 1972, completing a 2.5-mile (4.0 km) lap in 44.7 seconds. However, on raceday Grant's Eagle failed to complete a lap.

In addition to the controversial finish at Indianapolis in 1972, Grant suffered another famous stroke of bad luck in 1966, when his Ford GT Mk.II, with co-driver Dan Gurney behind the wheel, suffered an engine failure while leading two minutes from the end of the 12 Hours of Sebring. As at Indy, Gurney and Grant would have been awarded second place had they simply left the car where it came to rest. Instead, Gurney attempted to push the car over the finish line in violation of FIA rules, and the pair were disqualified.

Grant also competed in some NASCAR Grand National Series races, including some Daytona 500.

Later in his career, Grant was the racing representative for Champion Spark Plugs, years later he was hired by Elton Alderman, then-President of Prolong Super Lubricants to be a representative. The arraignment fell apart after Alderman did not follow through as promised.

Grant died on August 12, 2012, from liver failure and diabetes, at an Orange County, California hospital at the age of 77.

A memorial was held for Grant at the Riverside International Raceway Museum in Riverside, California. Conducted by Ed Justice Jr., many of Grant's close friends spoke, including longtime friend, co-driver and car owner, Dan Gurney.

== Indianapolis 500 results ==
Year	Chassis	Engine	Start	Finish
1964	Gerhardt	Offenhauser	Failed to Qualify	
1965	Huffaker	Offenhauser	17th	27th
1966	Eagle	Ford	10th	10th
1967	Eagle	Ford	30th	20th
1968	Eagle	Ford	15th	23rd
1969	Eagle	Chevrolet	Failed to Qualify	
1970	Eagle	Offenhauser	29th	7th
1971	Eagle	Offenhauser	Failed to Qualify	
1972	Eagle	Offenhauser	15th	12th
1973	Eagle	Offenhauser	18th	19th
1974	Eagle	Offenhauser	17th	10th
1975	Eagle	Offenhauser	14th	20th
1976	Eagle	AMC	20th	27th
1977	Eagle	Offenhauser	Practice Crash	

=== 24 Hours of Le Mans results ===
Year	Team	Co-Drivers	Car	Class	Laps	Pos.	Class Pos.
1965	(United States) Shelby-American Inc.	(United States) Dan Gurney	AC Cobra Daytona Coupé	GT 5.0	204	DNF	DNF
1966	(United States) Ford Motor Company (United States) Shelby American	(United States) Dan Gurney	Ford GT40 Mk.II	P +5.0	257	DNF	DNF
