= Lee Kunzman =

American racing driver (1944–2025)

- Nationality: American
- Born: November 28, 1944 Guttenberg, Iowa, U.S.
- Died: February 27, 2025 (aged 80)

Lee Kunzman (November 29, 1944 – February 27, 2025) was an American driver in the USAC and CART Championship Car series. He raced in the 1969, 1972–1973 and 1975-1980 seasons, with 48 combined career starts, including the 1971-1973, 1977, and 1979 Indianapolis 500. He finished in the top-ten 21 times, with his best finish in second position in 1979 at Atlanta.

Early in his career, Kunzman was the 1967 IMCA sprint car Rookie of the Year. Severe injuries from two accidents limited his driving in the early 1970s. In June 1970, Kunzman suffered an accident driving a sprint car at I-70 Speedway that left him with 3rd degree burns over 40% of his body, including severe burns to his nose, eyelids and lips, as well as a broken neck and right arm. Kunzman took 11 months to recover, returning to racing in April 1971, but suffered permanent scarring from the burns. Kunzman suffered a second major crash in December 1973 driving an IndyCar at Ontario Motor Speedway for a tire test. The accident left Kunzman with major head injuries and paralysis on the left side of his body. Kunzman did not return to racing until 1975.

Kunzman recorded his highest finish during the first race of the 1979 Gould Twin Dixie 125. Taking the lead after caution with 14 laps to go, he held it until passed by Johnny Rutherford on the penultimate lap. After completing his driving career, he became the general manager for Hemelgarn Racing and was part of Buddy Lazier's Indianapolis 500 winning team in 1996 and championship winning team in 2000.

Kunzman died on February 27, 2025, at the age of 80.

== Career award ==
Kunzman was inducted in the National Sprint Car Hall of Fame in 2006.

== Indianapolis 500 results ==
Year	Chassis	Engine	Start	Finish
1970	Morris	Ford	Failed to Qualify	
1972	Gerhardt	Offy	30th	17th
1973	Eagle	Offy	25th	7th
1975	Eagle	Offy	Failed to Qualify	
1976	Eagle	Offy	Failed to Qualify	
1977	Eagle	Offy	24th	7th
1978	Sugai Fox	Offy	Failed to Qualify	
1979	Parnelli	Cosworth	11th	30th
1982	Penske	Cosworth	Failed to Qualify	
