= Steve Krisiloff =

American racing driver

- Born: July 7, 1946 (age 80); Parsippany–Troy Hills, New Jersey, U.S.
- Relatives: Kyle Krisiloff (son)

Steve Krisiloff (born July 7, 1946), is a former driver in the USAC and CART Championship Car series. He raced in the 1969–1979, 1981 and 1983 seasons, with 111 combined career starts, and started in the Indianapolis 500 all but 1969–1970. He finished in the top-ten 46 times, with his best finish in second position in 1978 at Phoenix.

Raised in Parsippany–Troy Hills, New Jersey, Krisiloff graduated in 1965 from Parsippany High School. After racing, he served from 1984 to 1995 as vice-president of the Indianapolis Motor Speedway and later as the team manager for Patrick Racing and assistant team manager for PKV Racing until 2006.

Krisiloff was married to Josie George (daughter of Mari Hulman George) from 1985 to 1993. Tony George, CEO of the Indianapolis Motor Speedway Corporation and founder of the Indy Racing League and Vision Racing, is his former brother-in-law.

Krisiloff and Josie George had a son, Kyle Krisiloff, who has raced in the NASCAR Busch and Craftsman Truck Series. Krisiloff served as team manager for Carl A. Haas Motorsports, for whom Kyle drove the No. 14 Ford Fusion with Clabber Girl sponsorship in the 2007 NASCAR Busch Series.

== Indianapolis 500 results ==
Year	Car	Start	Qual	Rank	Finish	Laps	Led	Retired
1971	20	28	169.835	26	31	10	0	Blown engine
1972	15	10	181.433	19	21	102	0	Ignition Rotor
1973	24	7	194.932	7	6	129	0	Flagged
1974	60	15	182.519	17	22	72	0	Clutch
1975	98	29	182.408	28	11	162	0	Flagged
1976	92	23	182.131	20	24	95	0	Flagged
1977	92	25	184.691	33	9	191	0	Flagged
1978	40	13	191.255	19	4	198	5	Flagged
1979	7	28	186.287	15	11	192	0	Flagged
1981	53	17	186.722	30	8	194	0	Flagged
1983	43	31	191.192	31	29	42	0	U-Joint
Totals						1387	5	

Starts	11
Poles	0
Front Row	0
Wins	0
Top 5	1
Top 10	5
Retired	3

== See also ==
- List of select Jewish racing drivers
