= Eldon Rasmussen =

Canadian racing driver (1936–2022)

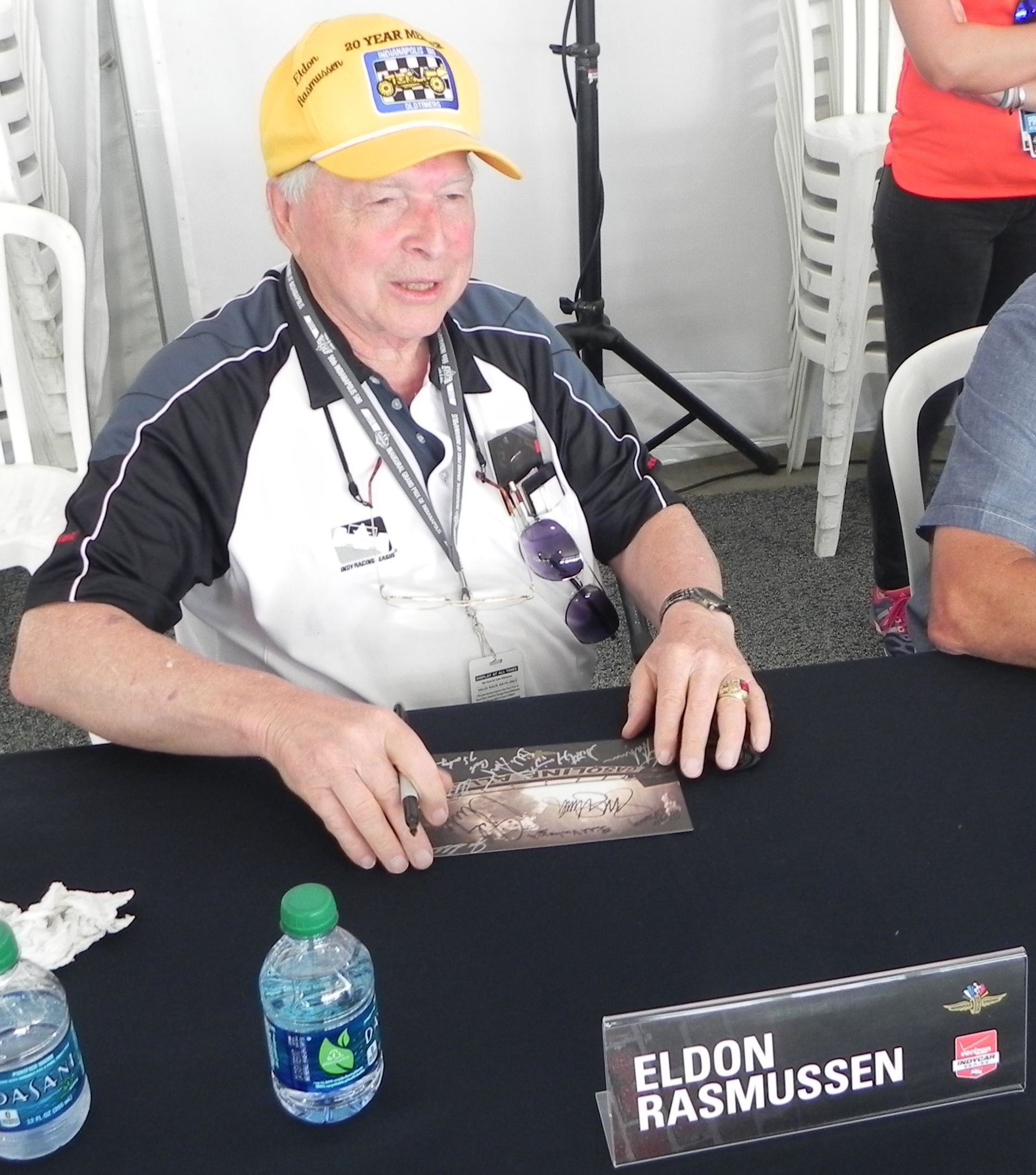
Rasmussen at the 2014 Indianapolis 500

Eldon Rasmussen (7 July 1936 – 5 June 2022) was a Canadian driver in the USAC Championship Car series. He raced in the 1971 and 1973–1979 seasons, with 23 career starts, including the 1975, 1977, and 1979 Indianapolis 500.

== Career ==
Rasmussen was born in Standard, Alberta, on July 7, 1936. In lap 125 of the 1975 Indy 500, Tom Sneva, attempting to lap Rasmussen, ran over his left front wheel and was launched into the Turn 2 wall, exploding and disintegrating before tumbling to a stop. The spectacular nature of the accident, and the fact that Sneva escaped serious injury, have led to its being replayed on television.

In his Champcar career, Rasmussen finished in the top-ten three times, with a best finish in 7th position in 1975 at the Ontario Motor Speedway in Ontario, California. He built his own race chassis which he dubbed the "Rascar" which he campaigned with limited success from 1973 to 1979. In all 3 of his Indy starts, Rasmussen qualified his Rascar on the last row.

Rasmussen was forced to retire from racing at the age of 42. He blew a tire in the 75th lap of the 1979 Pocono 500, causing him to hit the wall, resulting in a lower leg injury and a head injury. The crash caused a crack in the safety helmet of Rasmussen and left him unconscious when the first-aid crew arrived, he later regained consciousness while being treated for his injuries' on site at the track.

Rasmussen was a fabricator of race parts in Indianapolis for years and was inducted into the Canadian Motorsport Hall of Fame.

== Indianapolis 500 results ==
Year	Chassis	Engine	Start	Finish
1974	Rascar	Foyt	DNQ	
1975	Rascar	Foyt	32nd	24th
1976	Rascar	Foyt	DNQ	
1977	Rascar	Foyt	32nd	13th
1978	Rascar	Foyt	DNQ	
1979	Antares	Offy	33rd	23rd

== See also ==
- List of Canadians in Champ Car
