= Al Loquasto =

American racing driver (1940–1991)

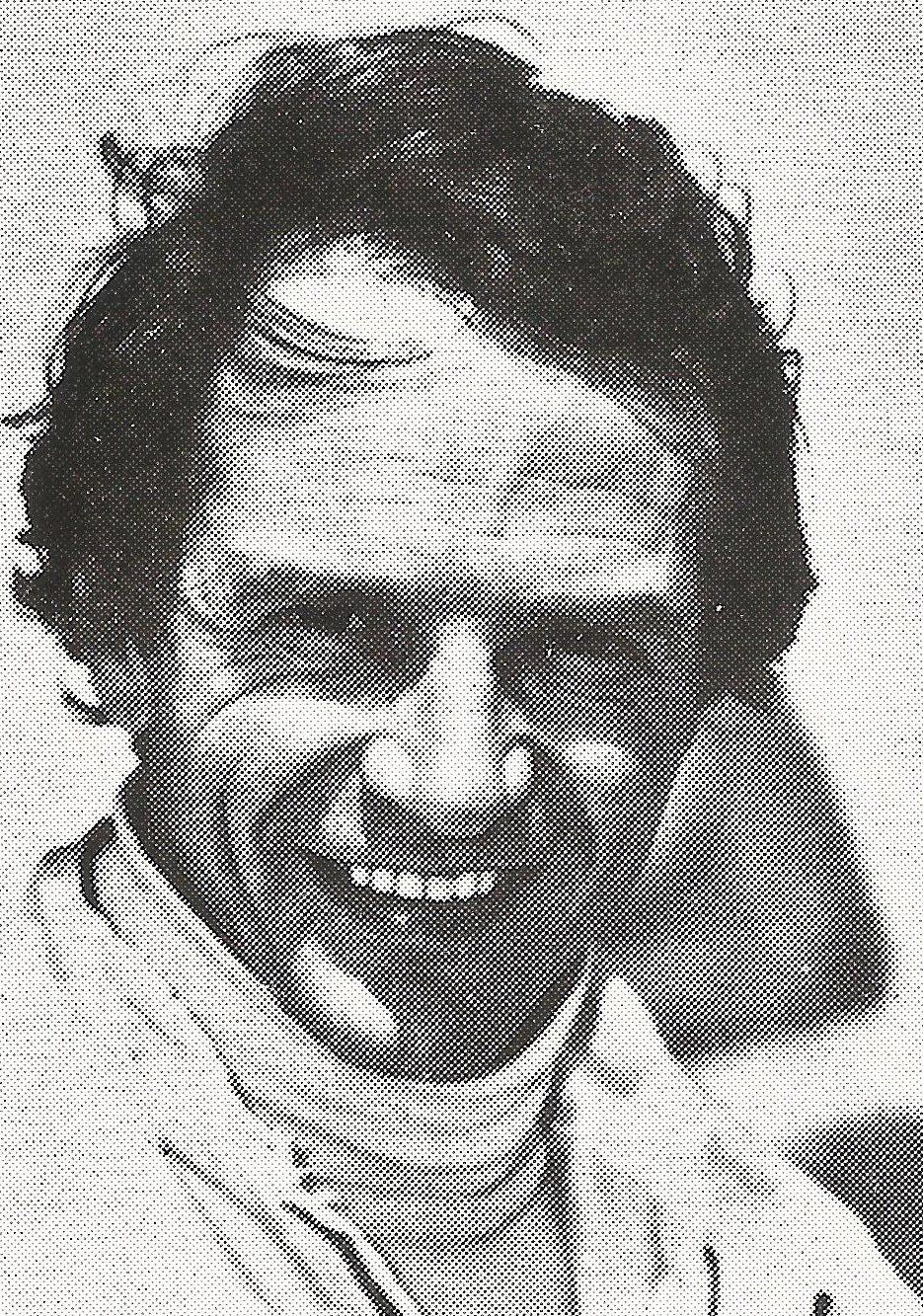
- Nationality: (United States) American
- Born: Albert John Loquasto Jr. June 21, 1940 Easton, Pennsylvania, U.S.
- Died: July 31, 1991 (aged 51) Fogelsville, Pennsylvania, U.S.

Champ Car career
- 60 races run over 15 years
- Years active: 1967, 1969–1980, 1982–1983
- Best finish: 19th – 1975
- First race: 1969 Rex Mays Classic (Milwaukee)
- Last race: 1983 Domino's Pizza 500 (Pocono)
Wins	Podiums	Poles
0	0	0

NASCAR Cup Series career
- 6 races run over 2 years
- Best finish: 81st (1982)
- First race: 1981 Mountain Dew 500 (Pocono)
- Last race: 1982 Busch 500 (Bristol)
Wins	Top tens	Poles
0	0	0

Albert John Loquasto Jr. (June 21, 1940 – July 31, 1991) was an American racing driver and businessperson.

== Racing career ==
Born in Easton, Pennsylvania, Loquasto died in a plane crash in Fogelsville, Pennsylvania. He drove in the USAC and CART Championship Car series, racing in the 1969–1980 and 1982–1983 seasons, with 61 combined career starts, including the 1976 and 1977 Indianapolis 500. He finished in the top-ten 11 times, with his best finish in seventh position in 1975 at Ontario.

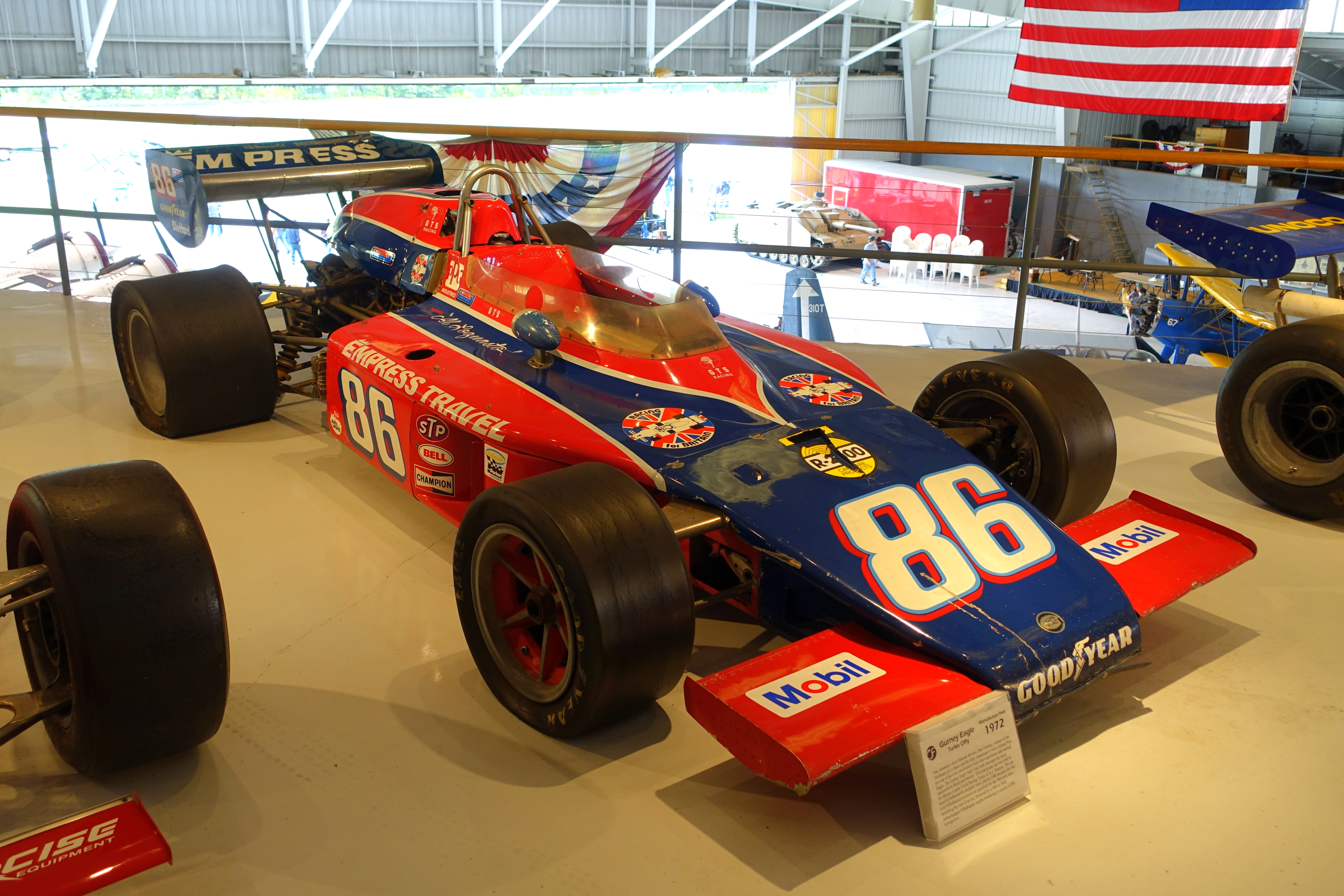
Loquasto's 1972 Gurney Eagle, which he drove during the 1982 CART season

Loquasto raced on a tight budget, fielding his own cars which were often several years old. He qualified for his first Indianapolis 500 after receiving technical assistance from Clint Brawner.

Loquasto drove six NASCAR races from 1981 to 1982. Prior to his open-wheel career, Loquasto was a five-time national hillclimbing champion.

== Personal life ==
Loquasto's chief occupation was as the owner of APCO, Inc., an automotive warranty company, and he was a veteran of the Vietnam War. Loquasto was a fourth-degree member of the Knights of Columbus.

Loquasto was the first cousin of scenic designer and costume designer Santo Loquasto, and a distant cousin of American author Angelo F. Coniglio.

== Motorsports career results ==
=== Indianapolis 500 ===
Year	Chassis	Engine	Start	Finish
1970	Gerhardt	Offy	Practice Crash	
1971	Gerhardt	Ford	Practice Crash	
1972	Gerhardt	Offy	Failed to Qualify	
1973	McLaren	Offy	Practice Crash	
1974	McLaren	Offy	Failed to Qualify	
1975	McLaren	Offy	Failed to Qualify	
1976	McLaren	Offy	24th	25th
1977	McLaren	Offy	15th	28th
1978	McLaren	Offy	Failed to Qualify	
1979	Eagle	Offy	Failed to Qualify	
1980	McLaren	Cosworth	Failed to Qualify	
1982	Eagle	Offy	Failed to Qualify	
1983	Penske	Cosworth	Failed to Qualify	
1984	March	Cosworth	Sold Car	

=== NASCAR ===
(key) (Bold – Pole position awarded by qualifying time. Italics – Pole position earned by points standings or practice time. * – Most laps led.)

==== Winston Cup Series ====
NASCAR Winston Cup Series results
Year	Team	No.	Make	1	2	3	4	5	6	7	8	9	10	11	12	13	14	15	16	17	18	19	20	21	22	23	24	25	26	27	28	29	30	31	NWCC	Pts	Ref
1981	Ulrich Racing	99	Buick	RSD	DAY	RCH	CAR	ATL	BRI	NWS	DAR	MAR	TAL	NSV	DOV	CLT	TWS	RSD	MCH	DAY	NSV	POC; 24	TAL	MCH	BRI	DAR	RCH	DOV	MAR	NWS	CLT	CAR	ATL	RSD	NA	-	
1982	Ulrich Racing	6	Buick	DAY	RCH	BRI	ATL	CAR	DAR	NWS	MAR	TAL	NSV	DOV	CLT	POC; 16	RSD	MCH	DAY	NSV	POC; 29	TAL; 24	MCH; 36	BRI; 37	DAR	RCH	DOV	NWS	CLT	MAR	CAR	ATL	RSD		81st	-	
