= Larry McCoy (racing driver) =

American racing driver

Lawrence Smith McCoy III (August 18, 1942 – December 9, 1979) was an American race car driver in open wheel racing.

Born in Langhorne, Pennsylvania, McCoy graduated from Bristol High School in Bristol, Pennsylvania, and then attended the University of Miami.

McCoy drove in the USAC Championship Car series, racing in the 1972–-1976 seasons with 24 starts. This included the 1975 and 1976 Indianapolis 500. His best finish was 12th place at Pocono Raceway in 1974. His career ended in 1977 following the death of his father, Lawrence Smith McCoy, Jr., who was the manager of the racing team. The team's sponsor subsequently withdrew funding.

After retiring from racing, McCoy continued overseeing his catering business in Bristol, Pa.

An unspecified illness that affected McCoy's neurological system left him unable to function normally, including his love for driving. After a prolonged struggle with this illness, Larry McCoy committed suicide in 1979 at his home in Langhorne, Pa. He left behind a wife, Diane, and son, Lawrence Smith McCoy IV and daughter, Colleen Kelly McCoy.
