= 1973 California 500 =

American auto race

(United States) 1973 California 500
Race details
- Race 11 of 16 in the 1973 USAC Championship Car season
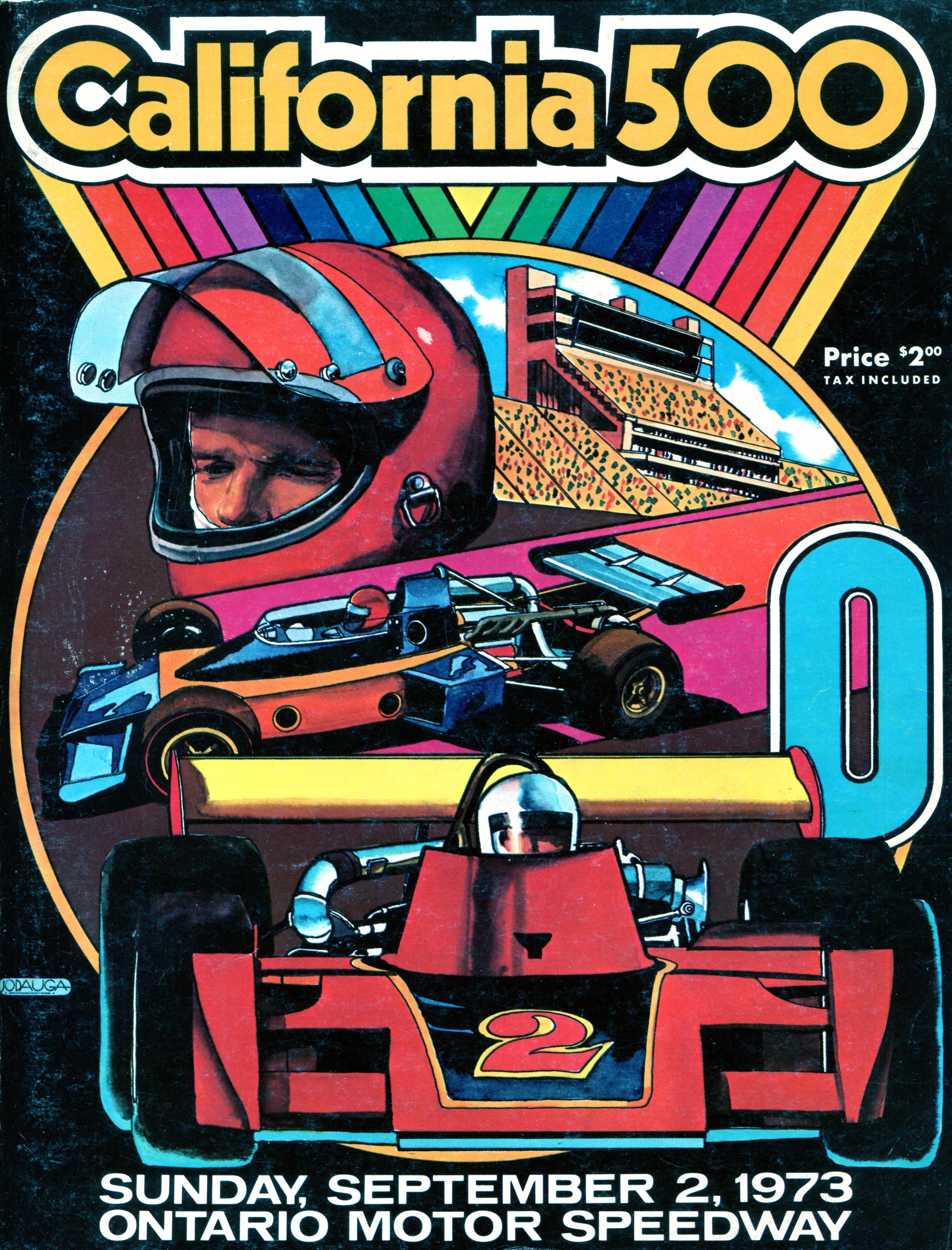
- Date: September 2, 1973
- Official name: 1973 California 500
- Location: Ontario Motor Speedway, Ontario, California, United States
- Course: Permanent racing facility 2.500 mi / 4.023 km
- Distance: 200 laps 500.000 mi / 804.672 km

Pole position
- Driver: (United States) Peter Revson (McLaren)
- Time: 200.089 mph (322.012 km/h)

Podium
- First: (United States) Wally Dallenbach Sr. (Andy Granatelli)
- Second: (United States) Mario Andretti (Vel's Parnelli Jones Racing)
- Third: (United States) Mike Mosley (Ralph Wilke)

The 1973 California 500, the fourth running of the event, was held at the Ontario Motor Speedway in Ontario, California, on Sunday, September 2, 1973. The event was race number 11 of 16 in the 1973 USAC Championship Car season. The race was won by Wally Dallenbach Sr., his only 500-mile Indy Car victory.

== Background ==
Ontario Motor Speedway was built using public bonds and the bond-owners were represented by the non-profit Ontario Motor Speedway Corporation. The track was then leased to a promoter group called Ontario Motor Speedway Incorporated. It was estimated that through large crowds, several races, and deals for television rights, a promoter group could make around $3.96 million annually and turn a profit on the $2 million due in rent. The group fell short in all areas.

Shortly after the 1972 California 500, OMS Inc. found themselves $9.7 million in debt and informed OMS Corp. that they would default on their $1,065,000 rent payment due in December. The track closed while a new promoter group was found. This forced the cancelation of a 500-mile NASCAR Winston Cup race on March 4, 1973.

On April 10, 1973, a joint group led by Indianapolis Motor Speedway owner Tony Hulman and Parnelli Jones reached a deal to lease the track from the non-profit board. The agreement was for one-year only while the group evaluated the profitability of the track.

Gordon Johncock won the 1973 Indianapolis 500 in a race marred by severe crashes. Art Pollard died in qualifying, while Swede Savage died as a result of injuries sustained during the race. In the aftermath of Indianapolis, USAC moved quickly to improve safety before the 500-mile races at Pocono and Ontario. At Indianapolis, cars were permitted to hold 75 gallons of fuel and an additional 275 gallons in a pit road tank. For Pocono and beyond, fuel capacity was decreased to 40 gallons and fuel cells were only permitted on the left side of the car. Furthermore, teams were allowed 300 gallons in the tank on pit road. Rear wings were reduced from 64 to 55 inches. It was hoped the smaller wings would reduce speeds.

The Hulman and Jones group looked to reduce expenses for the California 500, including a vast reduction in advertising. The past promoter group heavily advertised the races; $900,000 was spent promoting the 1970 California 500. The first three California 500s had 180,223 spectators in 1970, 168,498 in 1971, 161,240 in 1972. Entering the event, it was unclear if the 1973 crowd would even reach 100,000 spectators. Jim Cook, the executive vice-president of the Hulman-Jones Group said "Our biggest problem was getting people to realize that there was going to be a race." John Cooper, president of the past promoter group said, "People have a hard time separating this race from the debt service of the facility. This race has been a tremendous success all three times its been run."

The format of the California 500 was changed. Time trials were held on Saturday, August 25 to set the front row. The rest of the field would be set by two 100-mile Heat Races on Sunday that paid points towards the national championship.

== Practice and Time Trials ==
Practice began on Monday, August 20. High winds blew dust onto the track and USAC imposed a speed limit of 175 mph to ensure safety on the dirty track. Jerry Karl, Gordon Johncock and Lee Kunzman were black-flagged for running laps in excess of 177 mph. At 175.421 mph, Jimmy Caruthers was the fastest legal speed, followed by Mark Donohue at 175.295 mph.

A clean track for Tuesday's practice saw Lee Kunzman post the fastest speed at 190.904 mph, followed by Lloyd Ruby at 190.856 mph. Johnny Parsons hit the wall exiting turn one.

On Wednesday, Lloyd Ruby was fastest at 195.865 mph, followed by Lee Kunzman, Bobby Unser, Johnny Rutherford, and Peter Revson. Mike Hiss hit the wall exiting turn three and was treated at the track hospital for a slight leg injury. Tom Sneva hit the wall in turn one.

On Thursday, Bobby Unser was fastest at 196.014 mph, followed by Peter Revson and Lee Kunzman. Lee Brayton hit the wall exiting turn one and was uninjured.

On Friday, Gordon Johncock posted the fastest speed at 195.045 mph, followed by Gary Bettenhausen and Jimmy Caruthers. A special qualifying session was held for Mark Donohue and David Hobbs who planned to compete in the Can-Am Series race at Road America. Donohue ran a four-lap average speed of 194.847 mph. Hobbs suffered engine problems and was forced to stay for qualifying on Saturday. Rules stated that Donohue would not be eligible for the pole because his run came on Friday, but he would be able to start as high as second depending on his speed.

=== Pole Day - Saturday August 25 ===
A new qualifying procedure set the starting lineup beginning in 1973. Unlike in past years, time trials would no longer be a four-lap average, but rather a two-lap average. Sunday would have two heat races. The starting positions of the front row, top three fastest qualifiers, would be locked in after day one. The fastest 27 cars would be locked into the California 500. Drivers who qualified 4th through 18th would start no worse than 18th regardless of their finish in the heat races. Qualifiers between 19th and 27th would start no worse than 27th. The final six positions would be determined by finish in the heat races.

Peter Revson ran an average speed of 200.089 mph and won the pole for the California 500, backing up his pole in the Pocono 500. Jerry Grant qualified second at 198.873 mph with Gordon Johncock third at 197.542 mph. Those three positions were locked into the California 500 regardless of the Sunday Heat Races.

Bobby Unser was a favorite for the pole but suffered engine troubles on two separate qualifying runs and was unable to post a time. In a Sunday morning time trials session, Bobby Unser qualified for the race.

== Heat Races ==
The starting positions for the California 500 were set in part by a pair of 100-mile, 40-lap Heat Races on Sunday. Odd starting positions were in Heat One and even starting positions were in Heat Two. Each race paid 200 points towards the championship for the winner and paid money. Peter Revson, Jerry Grant, Bobby Unser, A. J. Foyt, George Snider, and Mark Donohue chose to skip the Heat Races.

=== Race One ===
Gordon Johncock led the field to green in Heat One and led the first 18 laps. USAC's rules limiting the amount of fuel held by cars meant pit stops would be needed around halfway. On lap 19, Johncock ran out of fuel and had to coast into the pits. At the same time, the second place car of Joe Leonard also ran out of fuel and coasted into the pits. That gave the lead to Johncock's teammate, Wally Dallenbach, whose team chose to de-tune the turbocharger to have better fuel economy but less power. Dallenbach pitted on lap 22 which gave the lead to Roger McCluskey. McCluskey, who lost the Pocono 500 when he ran out of fuel on the last lap, held the lead until he pitted a second time for fuel with two laps remaining. That gave the lead back to Dallenbach who won by 21 seconds over McCluskey. In six years of trying, Dallenbach had never won an IndyCar race until Milwaukee two weeks earlier, now won his second straight race. Dallenbach won $7,452.

=== Heat one results ===
Finish	Grid	No	Name	Entrant	Chassis	Engine	Laps	Time/Status	Led	Points
1	5	40	(United States) Wally Dallenbach	Patrick Racing	Eagle 73	Offenhauser	40	0:33:20.900	5	200
2	3	3	(United States) Roger McCluskey	Lindsey Hopkins Racing	McLaren M16B	Offenhauser	40	+21.100	17	160
3	9	6	(United States) Mike Hiss	Don Gerhardt	Eagle	Offenhauser	39	Flagged	0	140
4	6	21	(United States) Jimmy Caruthers	Fletcher Racing Team	Eagle	Offenhauser	39	Flagged	0	120
5	1	20	(United States) Gordon Johncock	Patrick Racing	Eagle 73	Offenhauser	39	Flagged	18	100
6	8	35	(United States) Jim McElreath	Champ Carr Inc.	Eagle	Offenhauser	39	Flagged	0	80
7	11	27	(United States) Tom Bigelow	Vollstedt Enterprises	Vollstedt	Offenhauser	38	Flagged	0	60
8	12	74	(United States) John Mahler	Roy Woods Racing	McLaren M16B	Offenhauser	38	Flagged	0	50
9	2	1	(United States) Joe Leonard	Vel's Parnelli Jones Racing	Parnelli	Offenhauser	38	Flagged	0	40
10	13	76	(Canada) John Cannon	Webster Racing	Eagle	Offenhauser	38	Flagged	0	30
11	3	34	(United States) Sam Posey	Champ Carr Inc.	Eagle	Offenhauser	35	Gear	0	0
12	7	2	(United States) Bill Vukovich II	Jerry O'Connell Racing	Eagle 73	Offenhauser	35	Flagged	0	10
13	10	89	(United States) John Martin	Automotive Technology	McLaren M16B	Offenhauser	3	Vibration	0	0

=== Race Two ===
Johnny Rutherford led the field to green in Heat two. On lap nine, the caution flag was thrown when David Hobbs blew a tire on backstretch and came to a rest exiting turn three. Rutherford entered pit road but missed his pit box and returned to the track. He came back in one lap later for refueling. That gave the lead to Lee Kunzman who led for the next 10 laps. When Kunzman pitted for fuel on lap 20, Mario Andretti assumed the lead. Andretti led until he and Rutherford pitted on lap 29. Andretti suffered a broken shift linkage and couldn't get his car in gear. That allowed Rutherford to retake the lead and hold it the rest of the way. For Rutherford, it was his first IndyCar victory since Atlanta in July 1965, and he earned $9,752. Gary Bettenhausen finished second and Lee Kunzman third. Kunzman's crew protested the finish, claiming Rutherford's two pit stops couldn't have beaten Kunzman's one but a scoring check showed Rutherford's pace was strong enough to finish faster despite his extra stop.

David Hobbs failed to make the California 500 while Tom Sneva raced his way in by virtue of his 10th-place finish.

=== Heat two results ===
Finish	Grid	No	Name	Entrant	Chassis	Engine	Laps	Time/Status	Led	Points
1	1	7	(United States) Johnny Rutherford	Team McLaren	McLaren M16C	Offenhauser	40	0:36:32.960	21	200
2	3	5	(United States) Gary Bettenhausen	Penske Racing	McLaren M16C	Offenhauser	40	+8.440	0	160
3	5	55	(United States) Lee Kunzman	Fletcher Racing Team	Eagle	Offenhauser	40	Running	10	140
4	4	4	(United States) Al Unser	Vel's Parnelli Jones Racing	Parnelli	Offenhauser	40	Running	0	120
5	6	98	(United States) Mike Mosley	Leader Card Racers	Eagle 68	Offenhauser	40	Running	0	100
6	8	24	(United States) Steve Krisiloff	Grant King Racers	King	Offenhauser	40	Running	0	80
7	9	16	(United States) Bentley Warren	Lindsey Hopkins Racing	Eagle	Offenhauser	39	Flagged	0	60
8	11	18	(United States) Lloyd Ruby	Commander Racing Team	Eagle	Offenhauser	38	Flagged	0	50
9	10	97	(United States) Johnny Parsons	Leader Card Racers	Eagle	Offenhauser	38	Flagged	0	40
10	14	10	(United States) Tom Sneva	Leader Card Racers	Eagle	Offenhauser	37	Flagged	0	30
11	7	44	(United States) Dick Simon	Dick Simon Racing	Eagle	Foyt	30	Magneto	0	20
12	2	11	(United States) Mario Andretti	Vel's Parnelli Jones Racing	Parnelli	Offenhauser	28	Shift linkage	9	10
13	12	73	(United Kingdom) David Hobbs	Roy Woods Racing	Eagle 73	Offenhauser	18	Flagged	0	0
14	13	99	(United States) Bill Simpson	Joe Hunt	Eagle	Offenhauser	0	Shifter	0	0

== Race ==
Amid a large reduction in promotion for the California 500, the crowd on hand was noticeably smaller. While 161,240 spectators attended in 1972, estimates for 1973 ranged between 80,000 and 100,000. Tony Hulman gave the command to start engines.

The main story of the day would be refueling pit stops. Fuel cells on cars were reduced from 75 gallons in 1972 to 40 gallons in 1973. Teams would be forced to refuel every 20 laps.

From his position on pole, Peter Revson pulled away from the field at the start. Johnny Rutherford followed his teammate through to second place. On lap two, Gordon Johncock blew an engine and Jerry Grant spun in the oil. Grant hit the wall and finished last for the second year in a row.

Revson maintained his lead when the race restarted. On lap 13, Rutherford spun in turn four and lightly hit the wall with his right-front wheel. The damage was enough to put him out of the race. Revson pitted for fuel which eventually cycled the lead to Mike Mosley. A broken crankshaft put Mark Donohue out of the race on lap 23. It was Donohue's last IndyCar race.

On lap 25, Lloyd Ruby lost his car in turbulent air and impacted the turn four wall with the right side of his car. Debris from the accident also eliminated Mike Hiss from the race. On lap 34, John Mahler and Bill Vukovich Jr. made contact between turns 1 and 2, which sent Mahler into the wall. Revson retired on lap 44 with engine failure. Gary Bettenhausen had led seven laps and was leading on lap 79 when engine failure put him out of the race. Only 15 were left running by the halfway point of the race.

From his 24th starting spot, Bobby Unser moved through the field and took the lead for the first time on lap 33. Unser led 62 laps, a race-high, but his chances for a win ended with 20 laps to go when part of the rear wing fell off. Unser lost five laps in the pits while making repairs.

Using the same fuel-efficient strategy used to win the heat race a week prior, Wally Dallenbach spent time leading while competitors made pit stops. After leading 28 laps, Mario Andretti pitted for the final time with 14 laps to go. That gave the lead to his teammate Al Unser. Unser pitted with 12 to go, giving the lead back to Dallenbach, who had Andretti and Unser in pursuit. With 9 laps remaining, Al Unser suffered a broken gearbox and returned to the pits.

Dallenbach won the California 500 by five seconds over Andretti, earning $106,720. Dallenbach made only nine pit stops during the race while Andretti made 12. 12 cars were running at the finish.

Before the race, it was announced that the 1974 California 500 would be run in March instead of Labor Day weekend, so that the Hulman-Jones promoter group could have the income of two big races before their biannual rent payment was due. On November 21, 1973, Hulman and Jones signed a five-year contract to continue the operation of Ontario Motor Speedway.

== Box score ==
Finish	Grid	No	Name	Entrant	Chassis	Engine	Laps	Time/Status	Led	Points
1	5	40	(United States) Wally Dallenbach	Patrick Racing	Eagle 73	Offenhauser	200	3:10:16.970	49	1000
2	15	11	(United States) Mario Andretti	Vel's Parnelli Jones Racing	Parnelli	Offenhauser	200	Running	28	800
3	10	98	(United States) Mike Mosley	Leader Card Racers	Eagle 68	Offenhauser	200	Running	22	700
4	7	3	(United States) Roger McCluskey	Lindsey Hopkins Racing	McLaren M16B	Offenhauser	199	Flagged	1	600
5	23	89	(United States) John Martin	Automotive Technology	McLaren M16B	Offenhauser	196	Flagged	0	500
6	13	34	(United States) Sam Posey	Champ Carr Inc.	Eagle	Offenhauser	195	Flagged	0	0
7	24	8	(United States) Bobby Unser	All American Racers	Eagle	Offenhauser	195	Flagged	62	300
8	22	16	(United States) Bentley Warren	Lindsey Hopkins Racing	Eagle	Offenhauser	194	Flagged	1	250
9	9	4	(United States) Al Unser	Vel's Parnelli Jones Racing	Parnelli	Offenhauser	191	Gearbox	7	200
10	26	14	(United States) A. J. Foyt	A. J. Foyt Enterprises	Coyote	Foyt	191	Flagged	5	150
11	28	27	(United States) Tom Bigelow	Vollstedt Enterprises	Vollstedt	Offenhauser	189	Flagged	0	100
12	11	24	(United States) Steve Krisiloff	Grant King Racers	King	Offenhauser	184	Flagged	0	50
13	8	55	(United States) Lee Kunzman	Fletcher Racing Team	Eagle	Offenhauser	145	Flagged	1	0
14	18	84	(United States) George Snider	A. J. Foyt Enterprises	Coyote	Foyt	144	Engine	0	0
15	20	21	(United States) Jimmy Caruthers	Fletcher Racing Team	Eagle	Offenhauser	119	Engine	0	0
16	25	19	(United States) Mel Kenyon	Lindsey Hopkins Racing	Eagle	Offenhauser	90	Crash	0	0
17	33	10	(United States) Tom Sneva	Leader Card Racers	Eagle	Offenhauser	90	Engine block	0	0
18	27	30	(United States) Jerry Karl	Smokey Yunick	Eagle	Chevrolet	84	Valve spring	0	0
19	6	5	(United States) Gary Bettenhausen	Penske Racing	McLaren M16C	Offenhauser	79	Engine	7	0
20	21	35	(United States) Jim McElreath	Champ Carr Inc.	Eagle	Offenhauser	77	Connecting rod	0	0
21	12	1	(United States) Joe Leonard	Vel's Parnelli Jones Racing	Parnelli	Offenhauser	60	Piston	0	0
22	14	44	(United States) Dick Simon	Dick Simon Racing	Eagle	Foyt	53	Engine	1	0
23	1	15	(United States) Peter Revson	Team McLaren	McLaren M16C	Offenhauser	43	Engine	15	0
24	16	2	(United States) Bill Vukovich II	Jerry O'Connell Racing	Eagle 73	Offenhauser	41	Brakes	0	0
25	31	97	(United States) Johnny Parsons	Leader Card Racers	Eagle	Offenhauser	40	Rear end	0	0
26	30	74	(United States) John Mahler	Roy Woods Racing	Eagle	Offenhauser	33	Crash	1	0
27	19	6	(United States) Mike Hiss	Don Gerhardt	Eagle	Offenhauser	28	Debris damage	0	0
28	29	18	(United States) Lloyd Ruby	Commander Racing Team	Eagle	Offenhauser	24	Crash	0	0
29	17	66	(United States) Mark Donohue	Penske Racing	McLaren	Offenhauser	22	Crankshaft	0	0
30	32	76	(Canada) John Cannon	Webster Racing	Eagle	Offenhauser	14	Fire	0	0
31	4	7	(United States) Johnny Rutherford	Team McLaren	McLaren M16C	Offenhauser	13	Crash	0	0
32	3	20	(United States) Gordon Johncock	Patrick Racing	Eagle 73	Offenhauser	2	Engine	0	0
33	2	48	(United States) Jerry Grant	All American Racers	Eagle	Offenhauser	1	Crash	0	0
