= California 500 (IndyCar) =

American auto race

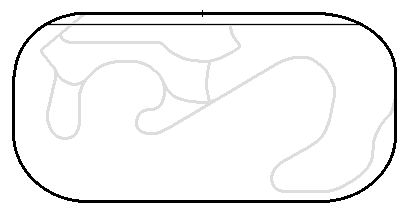
- Venue: Ontario Motor Speedway
- First race: 1970
- Last race: 1980
- Distance: 500 mi (800 km)
- Laps: 200
- Most wins (driver): Bobby Unser (4)
- Most wins (team): Eagle (3)
- Most wins (manufacturer): Chassis: All American Racers (3); Engine: Offenhauser (4); Cosworth (4)

The California 500 was a USAC, and later CART, race held at Ontario Motor Speedway in Ontario, California. The event represented a continuous lineage of open wheel oval racing in Southern California that dates back to 1970.

== History ==
Open wheel oval racing in southern California dated back to the USAC California 500 at Ontario Motor Speedway in Ontario, California, held from 1970 to 1978. The race was part of IndyCar racing's "triple crown," and at its inception, was held in high prestige. The inaugural running was considered a huge success, with 187,000 in attendance. However, it became a CART event in 1979 and the track fell into financial troubles in 1980, closing at the end of that year. Subsequent runnings were never able to match the success of the 1970 event.

Indy car races were also held at nearby Riverside, but only from 1967–1969 (prior to the opening of Ontario) in 1970 and again from 1981–1983 (after Ontario closed in 1980).

== Race results ==
Season	Date	Driver	Team	Chassis	Engine	Race Distance		Race Time	Average Speed (mph)	Report
Season	Date	Driver	Team	Chassis	Engine	Laps	Miles (km)	Race Time	Average Speed (mph)	Report
USAC Championship Car
1970	September 6	(United States) Jim McElreath	A. J. Foyt Enterprises	Coyote	Ford	200	500 (804.672)	3:07:22	160.106	Report
1971	September 5	(United States) Joe Leonard	Vel's Parnelli Jones	Colt	Ford	200	500 (804.672)	3:16:55	152.354	Report
1972	September 3	(United States) Roger McCluskey	Lindsey Hopkins Racing	McLaren	Offy	200	500 (804.672)	3:17:58	151.54	Report
1973	September 2	(United States) Wally Dallenbach Sr.	Patrick Racing	Eagle	Offy	200	500 (804.672)	3:10:17	157.66	Report
1974	March 10	(United States) Bobby Unser	All American Racers	Eagle	Offy	200	500 (804.672)	3:11:04	157.017	Report
1975	March 9	(United States) A. J. Foyt	A. J. Foyt Enterprises	Coyote	Foyt	200	500 (804.672)	3:14:22	154.344	Report
1976	September 5	(United States) Bobby Unser	All American Racers	Eagle	Offy	200	500 (804.672)	3:29:26	143.246	Report
1977	September 4	(United States) Al Unser	Vel's Parnelli Jones	Parnelli	Cosworth	200	500 (804.672)	3:17:16	154.687	Report
1978	September 3	(United States) Al Unser	Chaparral Racing	Chaparral	Cosworth	200	500 (804.672)	3:26:40	145.158	Report
CART Championship Car
1979	September 2	(United States) Bobby Unser	Penske Racing	Penske	Cosworth	200	500 (804.672)	3:24:22	146.794	Report
1980	August 31	(United States) Bobby Unser	Penske Racing	Penske	Cosworth	200	500 (804.672)	3:11:51	156.372	Report
