= 1974 California 500 =

American auto race

(United States) 1974 California 500
Race details
- Race 3 of 14 in the 1974 USAC Championship Car season
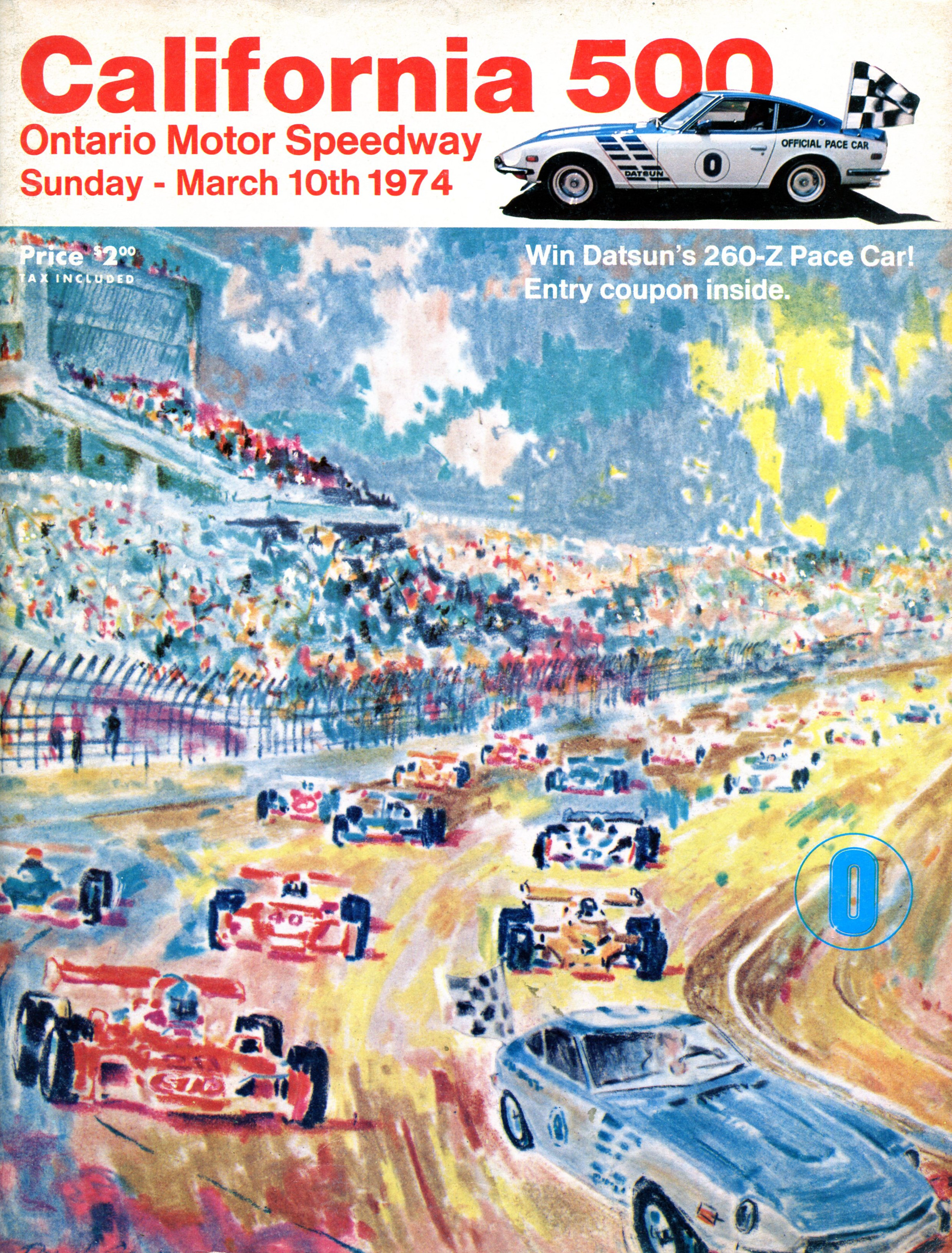
- Date: March 10, 1974
- Official name: 1974 California 500
- Location: Ontario Motor Speedway, Ontario, California, United States
- Course: Permanent racing facility 2.500 mi / 4.023 km
- Distance: 200 laps 500.000 mi / 804.672 km

Pole position
- Driver: (United States) A. J. Foyt (Gene White)
- Time: 190.617 mph (306.768 km/h)

Podium
- First: (United States) Bobby Unser (All American Racers)
- Second: (United States) Al Unser (Vel's Parnelli Jones Racing)
- Third: (United States) Jerry Grant (Fletcher Racing)

The 1974 California 500, the fifth running of the event, was held at the Ontario Motor Speedway in Ontario, California, on Sunday, March 10, 1974. The event was race number 3 of 14 in the 1974 USAC Championship Car season. The race was won by Bobby Unser, his first California 500 victory.

== Background ==
For the first four years, the California 500 was held on Labor Day weekend. In their second year in charge of the track, the promoter group led by Parnelli Jones and Tony Hulman moved the race to early March. Done for several reasons, the main reason being so the promoter group could get two races within 12 months to pay debts. It would also serve as a preview to Indianapolis, generating more interest. Finally, it wouldn't compete with other sports on Labor Day weekend as college football and the nearby Los Angeles Dodgers were in action.

Two months after the last California 500, Mark Donohue retired from driving. It was announced that defending California 500 polesitter, Peter Revson was hired to replace him at Team Penske for the 1974 Indianapolis 500, but would not enter the 1974 California 500.

After suffering serious injuries and burns in the 1973 Indianapolis 500, Salt Walther made his return to racing in the 1974 California 500.

To reduce the rising speeds of Indy cars that exceeded 200 mph in 1973, new USAC rules for 1974 mandated that rear wings be decreased from 53 inches to 44 inches. In addition, teams were only allowed 280 gallons of fuel to run the 500 mile race. This further limited speeds as engines needed to be detuned and limited in power to meet the 1.8 MPG needed to complete the race.

On December 11, 1973, Lee Kunzman suffered a critical head injury while testing at Ontario. His car began to spin in turn one, the car hit the wall head-on and then impacted the wall with the left-rear. Kunzman suffered critical head injuries and was in a coma for two weeks. He did not return to racing until 1975. Kunzman's spot at Fletcher Racing was taken by Jerry Grant while he recovered.

While testing at Ontario on January 29, 1974, Mario Andretti spun in turn two and impacted the wall with the rear of the car. Andretti suffered a concussion and slight whiplash and was hospitalized for two nights.

== Practice and Time Trials ==
Practice began on Tuesday, February 26, 1974. Bobby Unser was fastest during day one with a speed of 182.916 mph. Rookie Steve Durst spun in turn four while undergoing the 150 mph phase of his rookie test. USAC would not allow Durst to compete in the race and he was replaced by inaugural California 500 champion, Jim McElreath. A. J. Foyt was the fastest driver in Wednesday's practice with a speed of 187.134 mph. On Thursday, Foyt again was fastest with a speed of 188.496 mph. Rain washed out afternoon track activities.

On Friday's practice, Foyt increased his top speed to 190.904 mph. Mario Andretti was second at 187.367 mph. Salt Walther was third at 187.223 mph. Jerry Grant spun exiting turn four and made slight contact with the inside wall.

=== Pole Day - Saturday March 2 ===
A. J. Foyt continued his fast pace when he ran a two-lap average speed of 190.617 mph to win the pole for the California 500. Foyt was nearly five miles per hour faster than second place Johnny Rutherford who averaged 185.989 mph. Bobby Unser completed the front row at 185.797 mph. Foyt attributed his speed advantage to the reduced drag of his Coyote chassis relative to the other chassis makes. It was Foyt's first pole for a 500-mile race since the 1969 Indianapolis 500.

== Heat Races ==
Both heat race winners earned 200 points toward the season point standings and were awarded a Datsun 620 pickup truck. A crowd of 13,000 spectators braved cold weather and a delayed start by two hours due to overnight storms.

Before the races, motorcycle stunt performer Debbie Lawler attempted to jump a distance of 104 feet across 15 Datsuns on a Suzuki TM250. A 30 mph tailwind pushed her a distance of 146 feet and crashed upon landing and suffered three broken vertebra.

=== Race One ===
When the first heat started, Unser passed Foyt for the lead entering turn one. Down the backstretch, Foyt repassed Unser and drove off to a four-second lead by lap three. Several drivers, including Gordon Johncock, ran out of fuel and coasted back to the pits when they tried to stretch their first pit stop to lap 22. Mike Mosley ran out of fuel around halfway and ran out a second time on the final lap. Foyt won by 17.6 seconds over Bobby Unser.

=== Heat one results ===
Finish	Grid	No	Name	Entrant	Chassis	Engine	Laps	Time/Status	Led	Points
1	1	14	(United States) A. J. Foyt	A. J. Foyt Enterprises	Coyote	Foyt	40	0:33:55.360	40	200
2	2	48	(United States) Bobby Unser	All American Racers	Eagle 74	Offenhauser	40	Running	0	160
3	7	9	(United States) Lloyd Ruby	Unlimited Racing	Eagle	Offenhauser	40	Running	0	140
4	8	45	(United States) Jim McElreath	Don Gerhardt	Eagle	Offenhauser	40	Running	0	120
5	9	1	(United States) Roger McCluskey	Lindsey Hopkins Racing	McLaren M16B	Offenhauser	39	Flagged	0	100
6	10	98	(United States) Mike Mosley	Leader Card Racers	Eagle	Offenhauser	38	Out of fuel	0	80
7	4	2	(United States) Wally Dallenbach	Patrick Racing	Eagle	Offenhauser	37	Running	0	60
8	5	44	(United States) Dick Simon	Dick Simon Racing	Eagle	Foyt	37	Out of fuel	0	50
9	11	27	(United States) Tom Bigelow	Vollstedt Enterprises	Vollstedt	Offenhauser	37	Out of fuel	0	40
10	6	4	(United States) Bill Vukovich II	Jerry O'Connell Racing	Eagle	Offenhauser	37	Out of fuel	0	30
11	14	28	(United States) Lee Brayton	Eisenhour-Brayton Racing Team	Eagle	Offenhauser	35	Flagged	0	20
12	13	94	(United States) Bentley Warren	Vatis Enterprises	Finley	Offenhauser	34	Magneto	0	10
13	12	24	(United States) Tom Sneva	Grant King Racers	King	Offenhauser	33	Valve	0	0
14	3	7	(United States) Gordon Johncock	Patrick Racing	Eagle 74	Offenhauser	23	Out of fuel	0	0
15	15	23	(United States) Skip Barber	Crower Engineering	Eagle	Chevrolet	17	Connecting rod	0	0

=== Race Two ===
Johnny Rutherford led the first lap but was passed by Mario Andretti on lap two. Andretti led until he pitted for fuel on lap 22. Gary Bettenhausen assumed the lead after Andretti's stop. After leading for six laps, Bettenhausen's left wing end plate fell off and he retired from the race without enough time to repair it. Mario Andretti reassumed the lead. With three laps remaining, Andretti's engine started sputtering and he ran out of fuel, giving the lead back to Rutherford with Al Unser close behind. On the final lap, Unser ran out of fuel and Jimmy Caruthers finished second.

=== Heat two results ===
Finish	Grid	No	Name	Entrant	Chassis	Engine	Laps	Time/Status	Led	Points
1	1	3	(United States) Johnny Rutherford	Team McLaren	McLaren M16C/D	Offenhauser	40	0:34:44.860	4	200
2	7	21	(United States) Jimmy Caruthers	Fletcher Racing Team	Eagle	Offenhauser	40	Running	0	160
3	6	18	(United States) Steve Krisiloff	American Kids Racers	Eagle	Offenhauser	40	Running	0	140
4	11	16	(United States) Joe Leonard	Vel's Parnelli Jones Racing	Eagle	Offenhauser	40	Running	0	120
5	4	15	(United States) Al Unser	Vel's Parnelli Jones Racing	Eagle	Offenhauser	39	Out of fuel	0	100
6	12	89	(United States) John Martin	Automotive Technology	McLaren M16B	Offenhauser	39	Flagged	0	80
7	8	42	(United States) Jerry Karl	Lindsey Hopkins Racing	Eagle	Offenhauser	39	Flagged	0	60
8	9	77	(United States) Salt Walther	Dayton-Walther	McLaren M16C	Offenhauser	39	Flagged	0	50
9	3	5	(United States) Mario Andretti	Vel's Parnelli Jones Racing	Parnelli	Offenhauser	37	Out of fuel	30	40
10	10	82	(United States) George Snider	A. J. Foyt Enterprises	Atlanta	Foyt	37	Out of fuel	0	30
11	2	8	(United States) Gary Bettenhausen	Penske Racing	McLaren M16C	Offenhauser	29	Wing flap	6	20
12	14	53	(Canada) John Cannon	Pat O'Reilly	Atlanta	Foyt	18	Engine	0	10
13	5	55	(United States) Jerry Grant	Fletcher Racing Team	Eagle	Offenhauser	14	Magneto	0	0
14	13	92	(United States) Bill Simpson	Bill Simpson	Brabham	Offenhauser	10	Smoking	0	0
15	15	93	(United States) Bob Harkey	Cicada Racing	Cicada	Offenhauser	3	Handling	0	0

== Race ==
An estimated 90,000 spectators attended the fifth California 500, the first in March. Only 31 cars competed in the heat races. With two spots still available, USAC added Al Loquasto and Johnny Parsons to the lineup.

Defending California 500 polesitter, Peter Revson, attended the race with his girlfriend, winner of Miss World 1973, Marjorie Wallace. Revson died 12 days later while practicing for the 1974 South African Grand Prix.

As the race started, Bobby Unser pushed past A. J. Foyt to lead the first lap. On the backstretch of lap two, Foyt repassed Unser and looked untouchable from that point forward, extending his lead.

On lap 17, Mike Hiss hit the wall exiting turn two. Under caution, Gary Bettenhausen and Joe Leonard collided as Bettenhausen was exiting his pits and Leonard was entering. Leonard was spun around and Bettenhausen suffered a broken upright on his suspension. Bettenhausen's Team Penske crew took 56 laps to repair the car, but he returned to the race.

On lap 22, a piece of body work fell off the car driven by Salt Walther and was hit by Foyt. The debris cut an oil line on Foyt's car and put him out of the race. Foyt called the odds of such a bizarre incident occurring "a million to one."

Bobby Unser inherited the lead when Foyt retired. After 32 laps, Jerry Karl suffered a suspension failure and impacted the wall with the right rear in turn two. After driving back to the pits, the damage was too severe to repair. Al Unser took the lead on lap 38 and held it for the next 35 laps. On lap 72, Gordon Johncok spun and hit the wall in turn one. Shortly after the restart for Johncock's crash, Bobby Unser passed his brother, Al.

Steve Krisiloff led laps during green flag pit stops. On lap 92, he was black-flagged for leaking oil while leading. He entered the pits, and while refueling, the car caught fire due to a failure of the automatic shutoff on the fueling system. A crew member, Hardy Alan, received first and second degree burns on his arms, face, and legs.

Running ninth on lap 147, 1971 California 500 champion, Joe Leonard blew a left-front tire on the frontstretch. The car instantly veered to the left and impacted the inside pit wall. It continued into turn one and hit the outside wall in turn one. Leonard suffered a compound fracture to his left leg and a shattered left ankle. A piece of debris went into Leonard's helmet and cut him above the eye. Safety crews took 27 minutes to extract Leonard from the car. He was in a full leg cast for eight months. Leonard attempted a comeback in the 1975 California 500 driving for A. J. Foyt but failed a physical due to weakness in his left foot. He filed a lawsuit against Firestone seeking loss of pay compensation, alleging an engineer admitted the tire was defective and separated. Leonard never raced in IndyCar again.

The race was a thrilling duel between Bobby and Al Unser. The brothers led 170 of the 200 laps between them, with Al leading 115. After the last pit stop, Bobby held the lead with Al in close pursuit. As the cars finished the race, Bobby won by 0.58 seconds over Al. At the time, it was the closest finish to a 500-mile race in Indycar history. Jerry Grant finished third, followed by Jimmy Caruthers and Lloyd Ruby in fifth.

== Box score ==
Finish	Grid	No	Name	Entrant	Chassis	Engine	Laps	Time/Status	Led	Points
1	3	48	(United States) Bobby Unser	All American Racers	Eagle 74	Offenhauser	200	3:11:03.710	64	1000
2	8	15	(United States) Al Unser	Vel's Parnelli Jones Racing	Eagle	Offenhauser	200	+0.580	106	800
3	17	55	(United States) Jerry Grant	Fletcher Racing Team	Eagle	Offenhauser	199	Flagged	0	700
4	4	21	(United States) Jimmy Caruthers	Fletcher Racing Team	Eagle	Offenhauser	198	Flagged	0	600
5	6	9	(United States) Lloyd Ruby	Unlimited Racing	Eagle	Offenhauser	197	Flagged	0	500
6	10	2	(United States) Wally Dallenbach	Patrick Racing	Eagle	Offenhauser	196	Flagged	0	400
7	20	98	(United States) Mike Mosley	Leader Card Racers	Eagle	Offenhauser	195	Flagged	0	300
8	9	1	(United States) Roger McCluskey	Lindsey Hopkins Racing	McLaren M16B	Offenhauser	193	Flagged	0	250
9	21	89	(United States) John Martin	Automotive Technology	McLaren M16B	Offenhauser	193	Flagged	0	200
10	22	27	(United States) Tom Bigelow	Vollstedt Enterprises	Vollstedt	Offenhauser	192	Flagged	0	150
11	23	82	(United States) George Snider	A. J. Foyt Enterprises	Coyote	Foyt	192	Flagged	0	100
12	25	24	(United States) Tom Sneva	Grant King Racers	King	Offenhauser	192	Flagged	0	50
13	24	94	(United States) Bentley Warren	Vatis Enterprises	Finley	Offenhauser	187	Flagged	0	0
14	26	92	(United States) Bill Simpson	Bill Simpson	Brabham	Offenhauser	180	Flagged	0	0
15	7	45	(United States) Jim McElreath	Don Gerhardt	Eagle	Offenhauser	173	Water hose	2	0
16	28	53	(Canada) John Cannon	Pat O'Reilly	Atlanta	Foyt	173	Flagged	0	0
17	30	93	(United States) Bob Harkey	Cicada Racing	Cicada	Offenhauser	154	Gearbox	0	0
18	31	86	(United States) Al Loquasto	Loquasto Racing	McLaren	Chevrolet	152	Timing gear	0	0
19	19	16	(United States) Joe Leonard	Vel's Parnelli Jones Racing	Eagle	Offenhauser	146	Crash	0	0
20	16	8	(United States) Gary Bettenhausen	Penske Racing	McLaren M16C	Offenhauser	146	Flagged	0	0
21	15	4	(United States) Bill Vukovich II	Jerry O'Connell Racing	Eagle	Offenhauser	141	Piston	0	0
22	13	77	(United States) Salt Walther	Dayton-Walther	McLaren M16C	Offenhauser	128	Engine	0	0
23	27	76	(United States) Rick Muther	Webster Racing	Eagle	Offenhauser	121	Engine	0	0
24	5	18	(United States) Steve Krisiloff	American Kids Racers	Eagle	Offenhauser	93	Pit fire	6	0
25	14	5	(United States) Mario Andretti	Vel's Parnelli Jones Racing	Parnelli	Offenhauser	91	Engine	0	0
26	18	7	(United States) Gordon Johncock	Patrick Racing	Eagle 74	Offenhauser	71	Crash	0	0
27	2	3	(United States) Johnny Rutherford	Team McLaren	McLaren M16C/D	Offenhauser	49	Valve	0	0
28	12	44	(United States) Dick Simon	Dick Simon Racing	Eagle	Foyt	38	Piston	1	0
29	11	42	(United States) Jerry Karl	Lindsey Hopkins Racing	Eagle	Offenhauser	32	Crash	0	0
30	1	14	(United States) A. J. Foyt	A. J. Foyt Enterprises	Coyote	Foyt	21	Oil line	21	0
31	33	28	(United States) Mike Hiss	Eisenhour-Brayton Racing Team	Eagle	Offenhauser	17	Crash	0	0
32	29	23	(United States) Skip Barber	Crower Engineering	Eagle	Offenhauser	8	Overheating	0	0
33	32	97	(United States) Johnny Parsons	Leader Card Racers	Eagle	Offenhauser	0	Gearbox	0	0

== Broadcasting ==
For the first time, the California 500 was aired live on television. ABC's Wide World of Sports joined the race at 1:30 P.M. PST and aired the final hour and a half live. Keith Jackson, Jackie Stewart, and Chris Economaki were the announcers.
