= Wally Dallenbach =

Wally Dallenbach may refer to:

- Wally Dallenbach Sr. (1936–2024), long-time participant in USAC and CART as a driver and then as an administrator
- Wally Dallenbach Jr. (born 1963), his son, a driver in NASCAR and later a commentator for NBC and TNT
