= John Cannon (racing driver) =

Canadian racing driver (1933–1999)

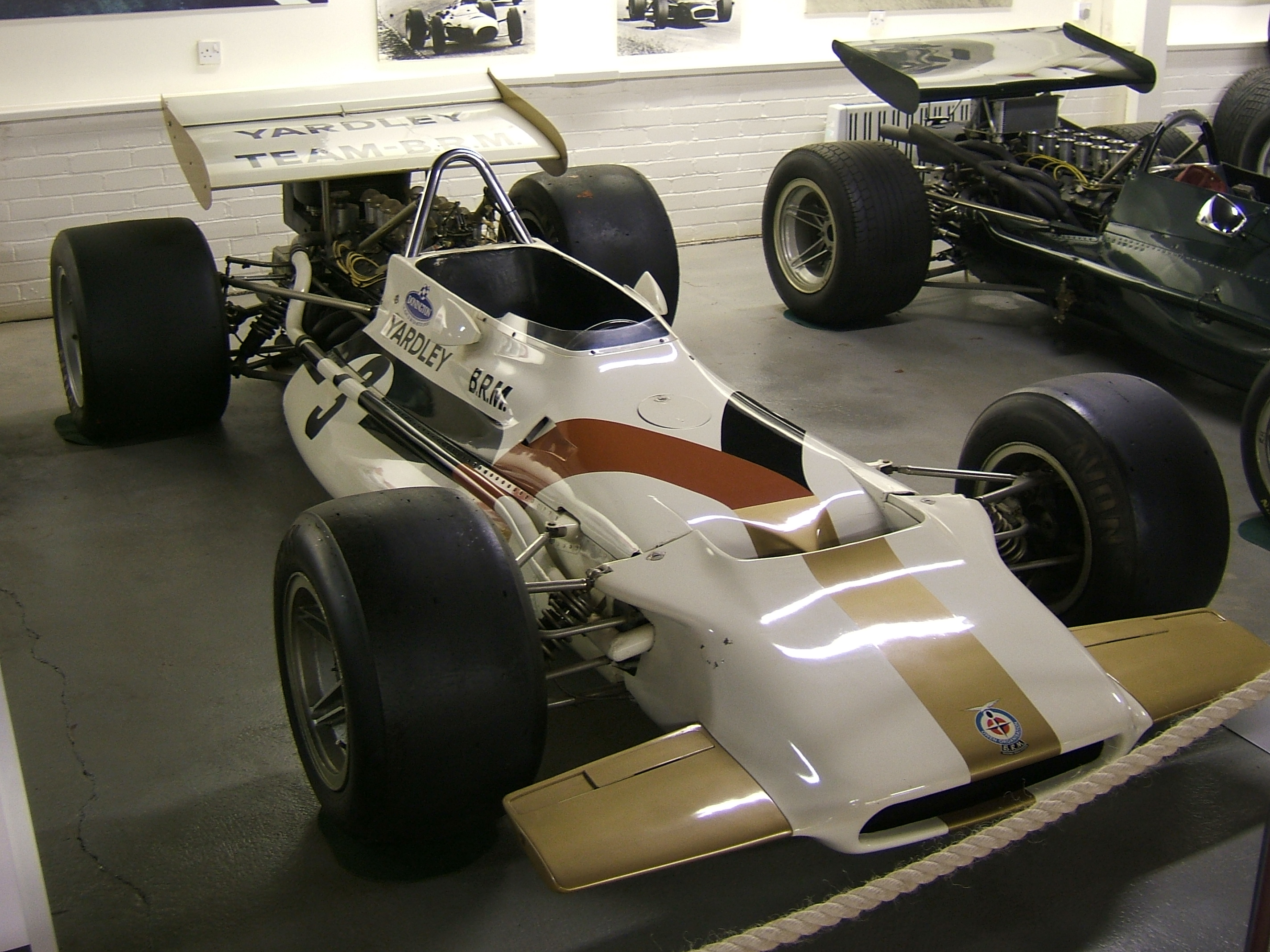
- Cannon's BRM P153 in 2007
- Born: 21 June 1933; London, United Kingdom
- Died: 18 October 1999 (aged 66); Quemado, New Mexico, U.S.

Formula One World Championship career
- Nationality: (Canada) Canadian
- Active years: 1971
- Team: BRM
- Entries: 1
- Championships: 0
- Wins: 0
- Podiums: 0
- Career points: 0
- Pole positions: 0
- Fastest laps: 0
- First entry: 1971 United States Grand Prix

John Cannon (21 June 1933 – 18 October 1999) was a sports car racer, who competed under the banner of Canada, though he was born in London, U.K. He raced in the USRRC series, the CanAm Series and the L&M Continental Series (Formula 5000).

In the USRRC, Cannon drove for Nickey Chevrolet in a Dan Blocker (of Bonanza fame) sponsored Genie/Vinegaroon.

In the first year of the Can Am, Cannon was the top finishing Canadian propelled by a fourth-place finish in the opening event at his home course, Circuit Mont-Tremblant. Cannon duplicated that accomplishment in 1968 propelled by a famous win over the dominant McLaren team in a very wet race at Laguna Seca. He also attained top Canadian status in 1973.

Cannon ran in the Continental Series (Formula 5000) in 1969 winning races at Riverside, Sears Point and Mosport in the Malcolm Starr Eagle prepared by Tom Jobe and Bob Skinner and finishing fourth in the standings. In 1970 he won the championship after winning races at Riverside, Kent and Elkhart Lake driving for Malcolm Starr and St Louis trucking magnate Carl Hogan, in the Hogan-Starr Racing McLaren M-10B. He also drove for Hogan Racing in the 1971 Tasman Series where he tied for 9th in the standings.

Cannon participated in one World Championship Formula One Grand Prix, on 3 October 1971 in the US Grand Prix at Watkins Glen. He finished 14th, thus he scored no championship points. He also participated in one non-Championship Formula One race, the Questor Grand Prix, finishing in 12th. During 1971 he also ran strongly in a number of rounds of the European F2 championship, impressing many.

Cannon also made 15 starts in the USAC Championship Car series while driving on a part-time basis from 1968 to 1974. His best finish was second place in the second race at Circuit Mont-Tremblant in 1968. He also finished a career best 27th in series points that year. He also attempted to qualify for the Indianapolis 500 in 1970 and 1974 but failed to make the race both years.

In 1975–76, Cannon returned to US F5000 series with a March 741 modified for F5000, and ran in midfield, with best results fourth at Riverside in 1975 and sixth on the same track in 1976 in the last US F5000 races. Although Cannon held the Ferrari dealership (actually, he worked for Hollywood Sports Cars-he did not own it) for LA, finance and engine costs limited his form in highly competitive final years of US F5000, however he proved competitive when he ran a few rounds in the UK Shellsport F5000/F1/Libre series in 1976. He ran the Australian F5000 Rothmans series at the start of 1976, winning the Sandown Park round. His last serious racing was two years later in the Australian Rothmans, aged 45 where he managed a single, third place, purely on reliability.

Cannon was inducted into the Canadian Motorsport Hall of Fame in 1993. His son Michael has built a career as a race engineer. During the 2006 season at Forsythe Racing in the Champ Car World Series, Michael was race engineer for A. J. Allmendinger.

Cannon died on October 18, 1999, after the kit plane he was piloting crashed near Quemado, New Mexico.

== Racing results ==
=== Complete Formula One World Championship results ===
(key)

| Year | Entrant | Chassis | Engine | 1 | 2 | 3 | 4 | 5 | 6 | 7 | 8 | 9 | 10 | 11 | WDC | Points |
|---|---|---|---|---|---|---|---|---|---|---|---|---|---|---|---|---|
| 1971 | Yardley BRM | BRM P153 | BRM V12 | RSA | ESP | MON | NED | FRA | GBR | GER | AUT | ITA | CAN | USA; 14 | NC | 0 |

=== American open-wheel ===
(key) (Races in bold indicate pole position)

==== Complete USAC Championship Car results ====
| Year | 1 | 2 | 3 | 4 | 5 | 6 | 7 | 8 | 9 | 10 | 11 | 12 | 13 | 14 | 15 | 16 | 17 | 18 | 19 | 20 | 21 | 22 | 23 | 24 | 25 | 26 | 27 | 28 | Pos | Points |
|---|---|---|---|---|---|---|---|---|---|---|---|---|---|---|---|---|---|---|---|---|---|---|---|---|---|---|---|---|---|---|
| 1968 | HAN | LVG | PHX | TRE | INDY | MIL | MOS | MOS | LAN | PIP | CDR; 10 | NAZ | IRP; 8 | IRP; 8 | LAN | LAN | MTR; 6 | MTR; 2 | SPR | MIL | DUQ | ISF | TRE | SAC | MCH | HAN | PHX | RIV; 9 | 27th | 505 |
| 1969 | PHX | HAN | INDY | MIL | LAN | PIP | CDR | NAZ | TRE | IRP | IRP | MIL | SPR | DOV | DUQ | ISF | BRN | BRN | TRE | SAC | KEN; 5 | KEN; 10 | PHX; DNQ | RIV; 29 | | | | | 40th | 130 |
| 1970 | PHX | SON; 11 | TRE | INDY; DNQ | MIL | LAN | CDR | MCH | IRP; 4 | ISF | MIL | ONT | DSF | INF | SED | TRE | SAC | PHX | | | | | | | | | | | NC | 0 |
| 1971 | RAF | RAF | PHX | TRE | INDY | MIL | POC | MCH | MIL | ONT | TRE | PHX; DNQ | | | | | | | | | | | | | | | | | NC | 0 |
| 1973 | TWS | TRE | TRE | INDY | MIL | POC | MIC | MIL | ONT; 10 | ONT | ONT; 30 | MIC | MIC | TRE | TXS | PHX | | | | | | | | | | | | | 33rd | 30 |
| 1974 | ONT | ONT; 12 | ONT; 16 | PHX; 20 | TRE; 19 | INDY; DNQ | MIL | POC | MIC | MIL | MIC | TRE | TRE | PHX | | | | | | | | | | | | | | | 37th | 10 |

== See also ==
- List of Canadians in Champ Car
