= 1973 Pocono 500 =

(United States) 1973 Pocono 500
Race details
- 6th round of the 1973 USAC Championship Car season
- Date: July 1, 1973
- Official name: 1973 Schaefer 500
- Location: Long Pond, Pennsylvania
- Course: Permanent racing facility 2.5 mi / 4.023 km
- Distance: 200 laps 500 mi / 804.672 km
- Weather: Temperatures up to 81 °F (27 °C); wind speeds up to 12 miles per hour (19 km/h)

Pole position
- Driver: (United States) Peter Revson (McLaren)
- Time: 190.468 mph

Podium
- First: (United States) A. J. Foyt (A. J. Foyt Racing)
- Second: (United States) Roger McCluskey (Lindsey Hopkins Jr.)
- Third: (United States) Lloyd Ruby (Commander Racing Team)

The 1973 Pocono 500, the 3rd running of the event, was held at the Pocono Raceway in Long Pond, Pennsylvania, on Sunday, July 1, 1973. Branded as the 1973 Schaefer 500 for sponsorship reasons, the race was won by A. J. Foyt, who passed Roger McCluskey on the last lap.

== Background ==
At the 1973 Indianapolis 500, several violent crashes marred on-track activities. Art Pollard was killed in qualifications. Salt Walther was seriously burned in a start crash. At the time of the Pocono 500, Swede Savage remained in critical condition from a lap 57 crash. In the aftermath of Indianapolis, USAC moved quickly to improve safety before Pocono.

At Indianapolis, cars were permitted to hold 75 gallons of fuel and an additional 275 gallons in a pit road tank. For Pocono, fuel capacity was decreased to 40 gallons and fuel cells were only permitted on the left side of the car. Furthermore, teams were allowed 300 gallons in the tank on pit road. The width of the rear wings were reduced from 64 to 55 inches. It was hoped the smaller wings would reduce speeds.

1972 Indianapolis 500 champion, Mark Donohue's entry in the Pocono 500 was initially disallowed by USAC because he had an SCCA racing license. On June 18, Donohue received approval to race because the Pocono 500 had FIA sanctioning and was approved as a "foreign graded driver."

== Practice ==
During Wednesday's opening practice session, Mike Mosley set the fastest speed at 185.6 mph. Mosley was making his Pocono debut after he was injured in crashes at Indianapolis in both 1971 and 1972.

On Thursday, Bobby Unser had the fastest speed at 186.900 mph. Al Unser was second fastest at 186.339 mph, Gordon Johncock third at 186.038 mph.

Rain on Friday morning shortened practice time. When the sun came out in the afternoon, Lloyd Ruby posted the fastest speed at 189.122 mph. Peter Revson was second fastest at 188.670 mph.

Despite the efforts of USAC to slow the cars with smaller wings, there was little effect on speeds. "What they did wasn't a drop in the bucket," Johnny Rutherford said. "The reduction in wing size was supposed to have cut speeds a bit. But look at these guys go out there. You can hardly tell the difference from Indianapolis."

== Time Trials ==
Qualifying runs were a four-lap, ten-mile average speed. On Saturday, June 23, Peter Revson won the pole with a 190.468 mph average. Revson's best single lap was 191.367 mph. Both four-lap average and single lap speeds were track records. Revson was joined on the front row by Al Unser and Mario Andretti.

Jerry Karl, driving a car prepared by Smokey Yunick, crashed on his qualifying run. Engine problems kept Gordon Johncock and Mark Donohue from making qualifying runs on day one. 21 cars posted speeds.

Day two of qualifying was led by Gordon Johncock with an average of 187.578 mph. Mark Donohue was second at 185.510 mph. Johncock and Donohue started 22nd and 23rd respectively. The day's track activity was shortened by rain before all cars could make a qualifying attempt.

With only 27 cars qualified and six spots still needing to be filled, a final qualifying session was scheduled for Wednesday.

Dick Simon was the fastest car in Wednesday's session at 180.054 mph. Jerry Karl's car was repaired from his Saturday crash and he qualified on Wednesday.

In a repeat of the 1972 race, massive rains fell at Pocono leading up to the race. On Thursday night, a nearby city recorded five inches of rain in a half hour. Continued rain on Friday added an additional two inches of precipitation. The majority of Pocono's infield was still dirt from the recent construction which turned to red mud. Water stood knee-high in some garage areas and infield tunnels were flooded.

== Race ==
USAC's new rules meant fuel consumption would play a major role in the race. With only 40 gallon fuel cells onboard, and cars getting 1.8 miles per gallon fuel economy, it was predicted teams would need to refuel 12 or 13 times.

Chasing the 1973 Formula One title, Peter Revson was required to run USAC's Triple Crown of 500 mile races as part of his contract with McLaren. Revson was forced to miss the French Grand Prix to run the Pocono 500.

1957 Indianapolis 500 winner Sam Hanks drove the pace car for the race, a 1973 AMC Javelin AMX specially prepared by Raybestos to be given to the race winner after the checkered flag.

When the green flag was waved, polesitter Peter Revson was passed by Mario Andretti who started on the outside of the front row in third. Entering turn one, Johnny Rutherford hit the wall and brought out the first caution of the day. Rutherford was able to continue and finished fifth.

Three laps after the race restarted, Al Unser hit the wall in turn one with the rear of the car and punctured a hole in the circuit's signature boiler plate steel barriers (the wall was replaced with concrete in 1990). Unser was hospitalized with a mild concussion, sprained neck, and minor lacerations of both legs. The race was stopped for 45 minutes to repair the wall.

Gary Bettenhausen crashed in turn three on lap 38. Johnny Rutherford brought out another caution on lap 55 when he spun in turn two. The polesitter, Peter Revson, fell out of the race after 75 laps with engine failure. Lee Kunzman hit the wall in turn one on lap 83.

While leading on lap 137, Indianapolis 500 champion, Gordon Johncock, blew a tire on the frontstretch and avoided contact with the wall. Johncock was unable to continue after leading 46 laps. Debris from Johncock's car cut both rear tires on A.J. Foyt's car.

Roger McCluskey held a one-second lead over A. J. Foyt as the cars approached the final pit stop. Jim McElreath stalled on lap 171 to bring out the final caution. McCluskey pitted on lap 172. Although the car's fuel cell held 40 gallons, McCluskey's chief mechanic Don Koda calculated they only needed 30 gallons to make it to the finish of the race returned the car to the track. Foyt pitted one lap later and took a similar amount of fuel, but stalled the engine leaving the pits. Shortly after the restart, McCluskey had a four-second lead over Foyt. Foyt's car developed a vibration and McCluskey extended his lead to ten seconds.

Foyt made a green flag pitstop for fuel with seven laps remaining, while McCluskey tried to stretch his fuel to the finish. McCluskey had a 42-second lead over Foyt as he entered the final five laps.

As the race began the final lap, it became apparent that McCluskey's crew failed to put in enough fuel on the final pit stop. Entering turn one on lap 200, McCluskey ran out of fuel. Foyt passed the slowing car and won his first 500-mile race since the 1967 Indianapolis 500. He became the first man to win four 500-mile Indy car races, the Pocono race joining his then-three wins at Indianapolis. It was the first time a 500-mile Indy car race was decided by a last lap pass. Foyt won $94,808 and was the only car on the lead lap. McCluskey failed to complete the final lap, but finished second, which earned him $48,933.

Only eight cars were running at the finish. The race saw 29 lead changes, a Pocono 500 record that stood until 2015.

One day after the Pocono 500, Swede Savage succumbed to his injuries suffered at Indianapolis.

== Box score ==
Finish	Grid	No	Name	Entrant	Chassis	Engine	Laps	Time/Status	Led	Points
1	14	14	(United States) A. J. Foyt	Gilmore Racing Team	Coyote	Foyt	200	3:26:58.240	11	1000
2	16	3	(United States) Roger McCluskey	Lindsey Hopkins Racing	Riley	Offenhauser	199	Out of fuel	62	800
3	4	18	(United States) Lloyd Ruby	Commander Racing Team	Eagle	Offenhauser	199	Flagged	0	700
4	8	98	(United States) Mike Mosley	Leader Card Racers	Eagle 68	Offenhauser	199	Flagged	0	600
5	7	7	(United States) Johnny Rutherford	Team McLaren	McLaren M16C	Offenhauser	195	Flagged	0	500
6	12	6	(United States) Mike Hiss	Don Gerhardt	Eagle	Offenhauser	191	Flagged	0	400
7	3	11	(United States) Mario Andretti	Vel's Parnelli Jones Racing	Parnelli	Offenhauser	184	Valve	10	300
8	15	1	(United States) Joe Leonard	Vel's Parnelli Jones Racing	Parnelli	Offenhauser	183	Flagged	0	250
9	24	35	(United States) Sam Posey	Champ Carr Inc.	Eagle	Offenhauser	168	Oil line	0	200
10	5	8	(United States) Bobby Unser	All American Racers	Eagle	Offenhauser	167	Clutch	36	150
11	25	34	(United States) Jim McElreath	Champ Carr Inc.	Eagle	Offenhauser	166	Ignition	0	100
12	28	44	(United States) Dick Simon	Dick Simon Racing	Eagle	Foyt	163	Turbocharger	0	50
13	20	9	(United States) Sammy Sessions	MVS	Eagle	Foyt	155	Valve	0	0
14	22	20	(United States) Gordon Johncock	Patrick Racing	Eagle 73	Offenhauser	136	Crash	46	0
15	30	17	(United States) Bob Harkey	Vollstedt Enterprises	Vollstedt	Offenhauser	135	Flagged	0	0
16	9	21	(United States) Jimmy Caruthers	Fletcher Racing Team	Eagle	Offenhauser	124	Piston	24	0
17	23	66	(United States) Mark Donohue	Penske Racing	Eagle	Offenhauser	104	Piston	8	0
18	33	19	(United States) Mel Kenyon	Lindsey Hopkins Racing	Eagle	Foyt	94	Rear end	0	0
19	26	77	(United States) Rick Muther	Leader Card Racers	Eagle	Offenhauser	91	Magneto	0	0
20	18	16	(United States) Lee Kunzman	Lindsey Hopkins Racing	Eagle	Offenhauser	82	Crash	1	0
21	1	15	(United States) Peter Revson	Team McLaren	McLaren M16C	Offenhauser	75	Valve	0	0
22	6	24	(United States) Steve Krisiloff	Grant King Racers	King	Offenhauser	67	Engine	0	0
23	32	56	(United States) Jim Hurtubise	Gohr Racing	Lola	Foyt	64	Piston	0	0
24	13	2	(United States) Bill Vukovich II	Jerry O'Connell Racing	Eagle 73	Offenhauser	64	Fuel pump	2	0
25	19	84	(United States) George Snider	Gilmore Racing Team	Coyote	Foyt	62	Brakes	0	0
26	29	30	(United States) Jerry Karl	Smokey Yunick	Eagle	Chevrolet	54	Timing gear	0	0
27	11	5	(United States) Gary Bettenhausen	Team McLaren	McLaren M16C	Offenhauser	37	Crash	0	0
28	31	89	(United States) John Martin	Automotive Technology	McLaren M16B	Offenhauser	28	Ignition	0	0
29	10	40	(United States) Wally Dallenbach	Andy Granatelli	Eagle 73	Offenhauser	25	Valve	0	0
30	21	94	(United States) Johnny Parsons	Vatis Enterprises	Eagle	Offenhauser	25	Engine	0	0
31	17	73	(United Kingdom) David Hobbs	Roy Woods Racing	Eagle 73	Offenhauser	24	Engine	0	0
32	27	27	(United States) Tom Bigelow	Vollstedt Enterprises	Vollstedt	Offenhauser	22	Oil pressure	0	0
33	2	4	(United States) Al Unser	Vel's Parnelli Jones Racing	Parnelli	Offenhauser	8	Crash	0	0

== Television ==
For the first time, the Pocono 500 was aired on ABC Wide World of Sports, broadcast on July 7, six days after the race was held, paired with a US vs USSR Wrestling Championship. Jim McKay, Chris Economaki, and Roger Penske served as commentators.
