= Lindsey Hopkins Sr. =

American businessman and philanthropist (1879–1937)

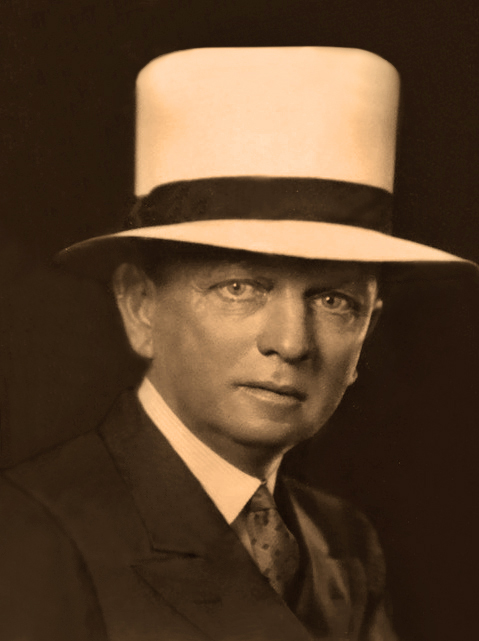
- Born: April 22, 1879; Reidsville, North Carolina, US
- Died: August 14, 1937 (aged 58)
- Education: University of North Carolina
- Known for: Coca-Cola; Banking; Investing; Coral Gables, Florida
- Spouse: Leonora J. Balsley (m. 1908)
- Children: Lindsey Hopkins Jr.
- Parents: Jonathan Hopkins; Minerva Jones

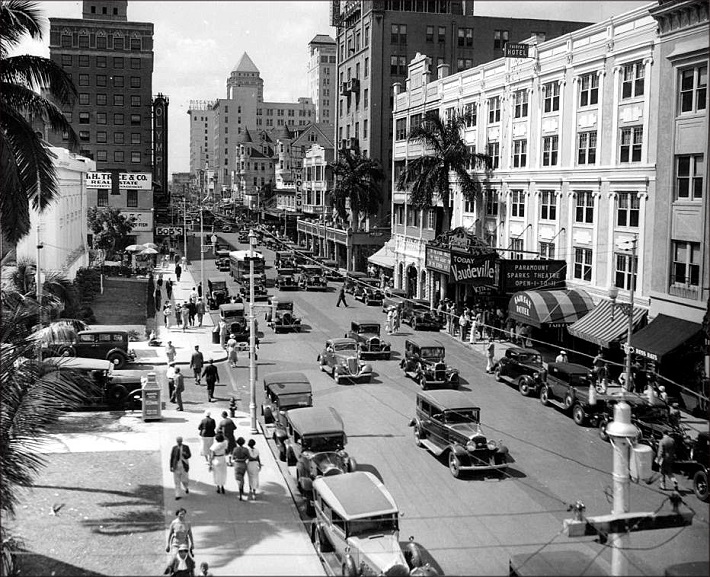
Miami, 1934

Lindsey Hopkins Sr. (April 22, 1879 – August 14, 1937) was an American businessman and philanthropist. He was a major stockholder and director of the Coca-Cola Company, the Sperry Corporation, North American Aviation (of which Eastern Airlines was a subsidiary), the Reynolds Metal Company, and several banks and insurance companies. His metropolitan Miami real estate included both business and hotel properties in Miami, Coral Gables, and Miami Beach.

== Early life ==
Lindsey Hopkins Sr. was born in Reidsville, North Carolina, on April 22, 1879, to parents Jonathan and Minerva Jones Hopkins. After graduating high school, he attended the University of North Carolina. He married Leonora J. Balsley of Greensboro, North Carolina in 1908.

Hopkins started as a printer's devil with the Greensboro Patriot, making $2 a week. He quickly advanced to selling oil and soon began making money by investing in new ventures.

== Business career ==
In 1905, Hopkins performed a promotional stunt where he drove a car 400 miles over muddy roads and swollen rivers from Atlanta, Georgia, to Greensboro, North Carolina. The trip took five and a half days, including several near-fatal mishaps along the way. In 1909, Hopkins moved from Greensboro, North Carolina, to Atlanta, Georgia, to engage in business with the fledgling automobile, oil, and gasoline industry. He started selling Overland automobiles, becoming a distributor in nine Southern states, and took an active interest in the Good Roads Movement.

Hopkins founded and was the chief stockholder and promoter in The Hopkins Aviation Company, then lost his large fortune in commercial aviation. He bought a Curtiss biplane in 1911 (one of the first private planes in Atlanta), flew the first piece of airmail into Atlanta, and sponsored the first air meet at Candler Field. He would later travel from Germany to the U.S. as a passenger on the second North American trip of the Zeppelin Hindenburg. By 1916, he had successfully recovered his losses and began investing in the cotton, railroad, rubber, and shipping industries, resulting in a substantial fortune amounting to several million dollars.

"My advice to any ambitious young man who wants to make a substantial success is be a plodder, but not a mole. Plod with your head up. You can't get ahead very fast, even by the hardest work, unless you look ahead. It is all right to concentrate your whole soul and energy on sweeping a floor or plowing a furrow – if you know why you are doing it. But nothing is more pathetic than to see a fellow in a little two-by-four job that he can't see anything beyond."

— Lindsey Hopkins Sr.

=== Miami ===
Hopkins was the owner of the Shoreland Arcade, one of Miami's principal commercial structures fronting on E. Flagler Street, N.E. First Street, and N.E. First Avenue. In addition to being a stockholder in the Carl G. Fisher hotel chain operating in Florida and New York, he owned 98 houses and cottages in Miami. Hopkins also had an interest in the 17-story Columbus Hotel at Biscayne Boulevard and N.E. First Street with S.A. Lynch.

Hopkins was also the director of the Bureau of Supplies at a time when, in his words, "the world's markets and the transportation facilities of the United States perhaps have never been as greatly demoralized as now." In 1917, he responded by letter to a request from one Mrs. Moore, who complained that she had been trying to obtain wool for more than two months. Because of a lack of supplies, the order couldn't be fulfilled completely. Hopkins explained: "Bear in mind that this situation exists, but that we are doing everything possible to increase the efficiency of the service."

At the time of his death at age 57, Hopkins owned a sizeable amount of valuable metropolitan Miami real estate, investing great sums in properties during the last few years before his passing.

==== Roosevelt Hotel (Lindsey Hopkins Technical College) ====
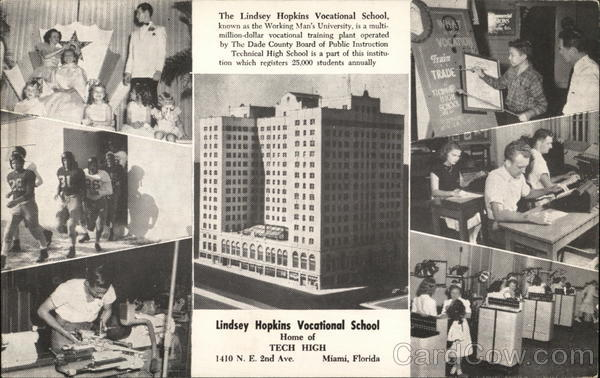
Postcard, Lindsey Hopkins Vocational School

The construction of the Roosevelt Hotel commenced under the direction of Fred Rand, situated at the far end of his Second Avenue business strip at Fourteenth Street. The project was intended to be a $2,750,000 hotel featuring 560 rooms. However, the Roosevelt Hotel project was left incomplete in 1926, and over the next decade, it fell into disrepair. The hotel was subsequently occupied by squatters and suffered damage from two hurricanes.

The structure was bought in January 1936 for $38,000 by his son, Lindsey Hopkins, Jr. and Oscar E. Dooley in order to repair and complete it. Over $1 million was spent to complete the Roosevelt Hotel.

Upon his death, the building was sold for $225,000 to the Miami Dade Public School district by Lindsey Hopkins Jr. in honor of his father and thus was named the Lindsey Hopkins Vocational School, now known as Lindsey Hopkins Technical College. At the time of the sale, the Roosevelt Hotel had an appraised value of $1 million.

Dad was a farm boy, from Reidsville, NC., and his first job brought him 50 cents a week. He wasn't a college graduate, though he studied a little at Chapel Hill, at the University of North Carolina. He was a self-made man, and a self-educated man. He did a good job, because I have met few men who had a better education – he read widely – he did it himself. The school that carries his name would have made him very proud.

— Lindsey Hopkins Jr.

=== Coral Gables ===
Hopkins financed and owned the San Sebastián Hotel in Coral Gables, Florida. He made it his winter home in the city for several years. Later, the hotel was acquired by the University of Miami for $200,000. The building would be used as a residence hall for female students, and it would provide apartments for some faculty members and quarters for nine sororities.

Hopkins was also responsible for building 100 homes in Coral Gables using The American Building Company of Cincinnati, Ohio, the same company used by Coral Gables developer George E. Merrick. He was also a member of the Century Club of Coral Gables.

=== Atlanta ===
Hopkins's holdings included real estate in Atlanta, Georgia, where he maintained a home on Peachtree Street for several years.

=== Coca-Cola Company ===
In 1921, Hopkins started buying Coca-Cola stock, and by spring of 1928, he was a major shareholder. Hopkins believed the Coca-Cola Company had barely scratched the surface of the possibilities before it, and that it was being devalued by Ernest Woodruff, a potential buyer.

As Frederick Allen tells in his book, Secret Formula, about how Coca-Cola became a worldwide brand,

On April 9, 1928, Hopkins leaked a story to the Associated Press in New York disclosing his role as the investor who had been buying Coca-Cola stock and pushing up its price. Then he walked into the main branch of Chase National Bank in New York, signed a six-month note, and borrowed $1 million in cash so he could buy more. For the next three weeks, he and the Woodruffs fought a desperate battle over the future of the company. Ernest, Robert, and their allies at Trust Company launched a new round of short sales, hoping to depress the price of the stock, while Hopkins spent his million dollars buying up their positions and keeping the value high.

== Philanthropy ==
One of Hopkins' major philanthropies was the donation of his Atlanta mansion and its grounds to the Peachtree Church of Atlanta for a parsonage. He shortly followed this gift with a donation of $100,000 to Emory University in Atlanta. That gift was one of the largest ever made to Atlanta charities in the 1930s. The money was planned to be used for the development of the Emory University medical department's facilities, and the erection of a home for the Good Samaritan Clinic.

== Death ==
Hopkins died of heart disease in Georgia on August 14, 1937, after a short illness.

Eddie Rickenbacker, who was a pallbearer at Hopkins's funeral, said, "He made friends wherever he went, and I am proud to say that our friendship has been more than 20 years' standing. He had friends everywhere because his interests were so wide that he numbered his friends in all walks of life".

Hopkins's death had a significant impact on the community due to his prominence as a philanthropist. Minister Dr. Bricker, at Hopkins's funeral, said he was a "man who did good in secret".
