= Wally Dallenbach Sr. =

American racing driver (1936–2024)

- Born: Wallace Jacob Dallenbach; December 12, 1936 East Brunswick, New Jersey, U.S.
- Died: April 29, 2024 (aged 87) Browns Mills, New Jersey, U.S.

Championship titles
- Major victories California 500 (1973)

Champ Car career
- 180 races run over 15 years
- Best finish: 2nd (1973)
- First race: 1965 Langhorne 125 (Langhorne)
- Last race: 1979 Miller High Life 150 (Phoenix)
- First win: 1973 Tony Bettenhausen 200 (Milwaukee)
- Last win: 1977 Trenton 200 (Trenton)
Wins	Podiums	Poles
5	27	1

NASCAR Cup Series career
- 4 races run over 3 years
- Best finish: 81st (1962)
- First race: 1962 Daytona Qualifier #2 (Daytona)
- Last race: 1974 National 500 (Charlotte)
Wins	Top tens	Poles
0	1	0

Wallace Jacob Dallenbach (December 12, 1936 – April 29, 2024) was an American racing driver and official. He competed primarily in United States Auto Club (USAC) sanctioned Championship cars, and was the winner of the 1973 California 500. After retiring from driving, he served for more than 20 years as Chief Steward of Competition for Championship Auto Racing Teams (CART).

Dallenbach was the father of NASCAR driver and commentator, Wallace Paul Dallenbach. After the younger Dallenbach began a professional racing career during the middle 1980s, the elder Dallenbach came to be known by the retronym Dallenbach Sr.

== Biography ==
Dallenbach was born in East Brunswick, New Jersey. After working in the construction industry, he began his racing career in modified racing. In 1962, he competed in the Daytona 500. He eventually settled on open-wheel racing, competing in midget and sprint cars before moving to Indy cars in 1965.

=== Indy car career ===
After several years competing in uncompetitive equipment, Dallenbach's breakthrough came after being signed by team owner Pat Patrick to replace driver Swede Savage, badly injured during the 1973 Indianapolis 500. After Savage's death, Dallenbach's seat became permanent. Four races into his tenure with Patrick's team, Dallenbach scored his first victory, the Tony Bettenhausen 200 at the Milwaukee Mile. He scored two further victories in 1973, including the California 500. Despite not starting in four races during the 1973 season, Dallenbach finished the 1973 USAC Championship Car season ranked second in points.

Dallenbach nearly won the 1975 Indianapolis 500, dueling with A. J. Foyt for many laps. He led for half of the race, but burned a piston on lap 162, twelve laps before the race was called due to rain. Bobby Unser won the race, which was halted at lap 174 (435 miles).

Dallenback came back to qualify Mario Andretti's car at the 1981 Indianapolis 500 as Mario was unavailable to qualify.

=== CART official ===
Dallenbach joined CART as Competition Director in 1980 and became Chief Steward of the series in 1981. Under his tenure, he greatly improved the safety program in CART, the preeminent sanctioning body of Indy car racing. He played an instrumental role in establishing the first dedicated rapid response trauma team in auto racing. He also established nondenominational church services for drivers and their families. Dallenbach held his position until the end of the 2000 season, after which he went into semi-retirement, serving as Special Advisor to CART and Chris Kneifel, his successor as Chief Steward.

Advance testing and practice in preparation for the 2001 Firestone Firehawk 600 – to be held at Texas Motor Speedway (TMS) – saw numerous drivers black out due to unprecedented g-forces experienced at the track. Dallenbach had visited TMS as early as 1996, deeming it unsafe for Indy car competition. On the day of the race, despite pressure from stakeholders within the CART community to proceed with the event, it was decided to cancel to event in order to ensure the safety of the competitors.

Shortly thereafter, Dallenbach returned as Chief Steward for CART, replacing Kneifel, who had been the subject of criticism from many drivers. Dallenbach served until the conclusion of the 2004 season, after which he retired permanently.

=== Post-racing activities ===
Dallenbach served as the president of the Colorado 500 motorcycle charity ride. The events have raised just under three million dollars in community support - including more than $800,000 in student scholarships - for the town of Basalt, Colorado, located in the Roaring Fork Valley region of western Colorado.

With his winnings from the California 500, Dallenbach purchased a ranch, fairground, cabins and a private automotive restoration garage near the Fryingpan River in upper Basalt. In 2023, he sold the property, returning with his wife to New Jersey. During their time in Colorado, the couple supported the development of local emergency services in the area; in 1976, Dallenbach purchased an ambulance for the town of Basalt.

Dallenbach died on April 29, 2024, at the age of 87.

== Awards and honors ==
Dallenbach has been inducted into the following halls of fame:

- Eastern Motorsport Press Association Hall of Fame (1992)
- Colorado Motorsports Hall of Fame (2004)
- Sports Hall of Fame of New Jersey (2004)
- Motorcycle Hall of Fame (2006)
- Motorsports Hall of Fame of America (2020)
- Canadian Motorsport Hall of Fame (2021)
- Indianapolis Motor Speedway Hall of Fame (2022)
- Pikes Peak Hill Climb Museum Hall of Fame (2022)

After his death in 2024, the community of Basalt, Colorado named their newest ambulance after Dallenbach; in 1976 he had purchased the community its first ambulance.

== Motorsports career results ==
=== USAC Championship Car results ===
(key) (Races in bold indicate pole position)

Year	Team	Chassis	Engine	1	2	3	4	5	6	7	8	9	10	11	12	13	14	15	16	17	18	19	20	21	22	23	24	25	26	27	28	Rank	Points	Ref
1965	Joe Barzda	Kurtis	Offenhauser	PHX	TRE	INDY	MIL	LAN	PIP	TRE	IRP	ATL	LAN; 13	MIL; DNQ	SPR	MIL	DUQ	ISF														37th	80	
1965	Kenny Brenn	Meskowski	Offenhauser																TRE; 9	SAC	PHX											37th	80	
1966	Kenny Brenn	Meskowski	Offenhauser	PHX	TRE	INDY	MIL	LAN	ATL; DNQ	PIP	IRP	LAN; 13	SPR	MIL; 15	DUQ	ISF	TRE; 11	SAC														50th	40	
1966	Taasi Vatis	Huffaker	Offenhauser																PHX; 24													50th	40	
1967	Taasi Vatis	Huffaker	Offenhauser	PHX; 18	TRE; DNQ	INDY; 29	MIL; 5	LAN; 12	PIP	MOS; 12	MOS; 12	IRP; 15	LAN; 4	MTR; 8	MTR; 15		MIL; 21	DUQ; DNQ	ISF; DNQ	TRE; 19	SAC; DNQ	HAN; 17	PHX; 15	RIV; 25								21st	410	
1967	Taasi Vatis	Vollstedt	Offenhauser													SPR; 17																21st	410	
1968	Taasi Vatis	Finley	Offenhauser				TRE; 3	INDY; 17	MIL; 7	MOS; DNQ	MOS	LAN; 15	PIP	CDR									MIL; 20	DUQ; DNQ		TRE; 18		MCH; 22	HAN; 23	PHX; 25		16th	960	
1968	Taasi Vatis	Vollstedt	Offenhauser												NAZ; 11	IRP	IRP					SPR; 7			ISF; 13		SAC; 9					16th	960	
1968	Taasi Vatis	Huffaker	Offenhauser	HAN; 7	LVG	PHX; 4												LAN; 3	LAN; 5													16th	960	
1968	Taasi Vatis	Huffaker	Ford																	MTR; 20	MTR											16th	960	
1968	Rolla Vollstedt	Vollstedt	Ford																												RIV; 29	16th	960	
1969	Lindsey Hopkins	Eagle	Chevrolet							CDR; 8																	RIV; 7					6th	1795	
1969	Lindsey Hopkins	Eagle	Offenhauser	PHX; 2	HAN; 5	INDY; 21	MIL; 20	LAN; 3	PIP			TRE; 2	IRP; DNS	IRP; DNQ	MIL; 18		DOV; 14	DUQ; Wth	ISF; DNQ	BRN	BRN	TRE; 10				PHX; 3						6th	1795	
1969	Lindsey Hopkins	Kuzma	Offenhauser													SPR; 7																6th	1795	
1969	Lindsey Hopkins	Vollstedt	Offenhauser																				SAC; 9	KEN	KEN							6th	1795	
1969	Kenny Brenn	Meskowski	Offenhauser								NAZ; 5																					6th	1795	
1970	Lindsey Hopkins	Eagle	Ford																		PHX; 4											18th	620	
1970	Lindsey Hopkins	Eagle	Offenhauser	PHX; 10	SON	TRE; 17	INDY; 17	MIL; 8	LAN; 7	CDR	MCH; 16	IRP; 5	SPR	MIL; 9	ONT; 28	DUQ	ISF; DNQ	SED														18th	620	
1970	Lindsey Hopkins	Kuzma	Offenhauser																TRE; 15	SAC												18th	620	
1971	Lindsey Hopkins	Kuzma	Offenhauser	RAF	RAF	PHX; 7	TRE; 2	INDY; 24	MIL; 4		MCH; 4	MIL; 4	ONT; 23	TRE; 9																		10th	1220	
1971	Lindsey Hopkins	Kenyon	Ford							POC; 15																						10th	1220	
1971	Vollstedt Enterprises	Vollstedt	Ford												PHX; 11																	10th	1220	
1972	Lindsey Hopkins	Eagle	Offenhauser	PHX; 9	TRE; 6																											13th	720	
1972	Andy Granatelli	Lola	Foyt			INDY; 15	MIL; DNQ	MCH; 2	POC; 14	MIL; DNQ	ONT; 21	TRE; 7	PHX; 24																			13th	720	
1973	Patrick Racing	Eagle	Offenhauser	TWS	TRE	TRE		MIL; 4	POC; 29	MCH; 6	**MIL**; 1	ONT; 1	ONT	ONT; 1	MCH; 23	MCH	TRE; 3	TWS; 6	PHX; 2													2nd	2620	
1973	Oscar Olson	Eagle	Offenhauser				INDY; 24																									2nd	2620	
1974	Patrick Racing	Eagle	Offenhauser	ONT; 7	ONT	ONT; 6	PHX; 6	TRE; 13	INDY; 30	MIL; 15	POC; 10	MCH; 6	MIL; 3	MCH; 11	TRE; 3	TRE; 12	PHX; 18															9th	1445	
1975	Patrick Racing	Eagle	Offenhauser	ONT	ONT; 1	ONT; 10	PHX; 6	TRE; 5					MIL; 4																			4th	2305	
1975	Patrick Racing	Wildcat	DGS						INDY; 9	MIL; 4	POC; 2	MCH; 19		MCH; 16	TRE; 5	PHX; 12																4th	2305	
1976	Patrick Racing	Wildcat	DGS	PHX; 16	TRE; 6	INDY; 4	MIL; 12	POC; 3	MCH; 20	TWS; 2	TRE; 4	MIL; 17	ONT; 4	MCH; 3	TWS; 6	PHX; 4																3rd	3105	
1977	Patrick Racing	Wildcat	DGS	ONT; 18	PHX; 10	TWS; 3	TRE; 1	INDY; 4	MIL; 15	POC; 4	MOS; 16	MCH; 8	TWS; 17	MIL; 3	ONT; 20	MCH; 3	PHX; 6															6th	2635	
1978	Jerry O'Connell	McLaren	Cosworth	PHX; 14	ONT; 9	TWS; 4	TRE; 11	INDY; 5	MOS; 11	MIL; 3	POC; 4	MCH; 3	ATL; 9	TWS; 4	MIL; 7	ONT; 10	MCH; 11		SIL; 14	BRH; 5	PHX; 6											6th	2966	
1978	Jerry O'Connell	Lightning	Cosworth															TRE; 6														6th	2966	
1979	Patrick Racing	Penske	Cosworth	ONT	TWS	INDY; 27	MIL	POC	TWS	MIL																						NC	0	
1981–82	Patrick Racing	Wildcat	Cosworth	INDY; Rpl	POC	ILL	DUQ	ISF	INDY																							NC	0	

=== CART Championship Car results ===
(key) (Races in bold indicate pole position)

Year	Team	Chassis	Engine	1	2	3	4	5	6	7	8	9	10	11	12	13	14	Rank	Points	Ref
1979	Patrick Racing	Wildcat	Offenhauser														PHX; 12	9th	1149	
1979	Patrick Racing	Wildcat	Cosworth	PHX; 7														9th	1149	
1979	Patrick Racing	Lightning	Cosworth		ATL; 11	ATL; 8												9th	1149	
1979	Patrick Racing	Penske	Cosworth				INDY; 27	TRE; 4	TRE; 2	MCH; 5	MCH; 10	WGL; 14	TRE; 4	ONT; 24	MCH; 6	ATL; 4		9th	1149	

=== Indianapolis 500 results ===
Year	Car	Start	Qual	Rank	Finish	Laps	Led	Retired
1967	53	15	163.540	19	29	73	0	Crash FS
1968	54	12	165.548	12	17	148	0	Engine
1969	22	19	166.497	19	21	82	7	Clutch
1970	22	24	165.601	31	17	143	0	Coil
1971	22	23	171.159	17	24	69	0	Valve
1972	40	33	181.626	18	15	182	0	Flagged (substitute driver for Art Pollard)
1973	62	20	190.200	26	24	48	0	Broken rod
1974	40	2	189.683	3	30	3	2	Piston
1975	40	21	190.648	4	9	162	96	Piston
1976	40	7	184.445	12	4	101	3	Flagged
1977	40	10	189.563	13	4	199	0	Flagged
1978	6	7	195.233	9	5	195	0	Flagged
1979	6	7	188.285	8	27	43	0	Lost wheel
1981	Substitute qualifier for Mario Andretti							
**Totals**						1448	108	

Starts	13
Poles	0
Front row	1
Wins	0
Top 5s	3
Top 10s	4
Retired	9

- In 1972, Dallenbach was bumped on the final day of time trials. Art Pollard crashed his qualified car on May 16, and was too injured to drive on race day. Dallenbach was hired to fill the seat, and the car was moved to 33rd starting position.
