= 1979 Trenton Twin Indy =

Fourth event of the 1979 CART season

The 1979 Trenton Twin Indy was an Indy car racing event consisting of the fifth and sixth rounds of the 1979 CART season, held on June 10, at Trenton Speedway, Hamilton Township, Mercer County, near Trenton, New Jersey

== Race 1 ==
(United States) 1979 Trenton Twin Indy - Race 1
Race details
- Race 5 of 14 in the 1979 CART season
- Trenton Speedway
- Date: June 10, 1979
- Official name: Trenton Twin Indy
- Location: Trenton Speedway, Hamilton Township, Mercer County, near Trenton, New Jersey Course = Oval
- Course: Permanent racing facility 1.5 mi / 2.41 km
- Distance: 67 laps 100.5 mi / 161.704 km
- Weather: Unknown

Pole position
- Driver: (United States) Gordon Johncock (Team Patrick)
- Time: 31.341

Fastest lap
- Driver: Unknown (Unknown)
- Time: Unknown (on lap Unknown of 67)

Podium
- First: (United States) Bobby Unser (Team Penske)
- Second: (United States) Al Unser (Chaparral Cars)
- Third: (United States) Gordon Johncock (Team Patrick)

=== Summary ===
Gordon Johncock won the pole for the race, with Bobby Unser starting second, Al Unser starting third, Tom Sneva starting fourth, and Johnny Rutherford starting fifth.

In the race, Johncock held the lead for the first 44 laps, before Bobby Unser took the lead on lap 45 after Johncock entered the pits. Johncock fell further to third after he spun out on lap 49.

Al Unser moved up to second, and was two seconds behind Bobby Unser when a caution came out on lap 57, but when the green flag flew again Bobby Unser won over his brother.

Johncock finished third, Wally Dallenbach finished fourth, and Rick Mears finished fifth.

=== Results ===
Pos	Sta	No	Driver	Team	Laps	Time/Retired	Led	Pts
1	2	12	Bobby Unser	Penske Racing	67	0:49:50	23	200
2	3	2	Al Unser	Chaparral Cars	67		0	160
3	1	20	Gordon Johncock	Patrick Racing	67		44	140
4	7	40	Wally Dallenbach	Patrick Racing	66	+1 Lap	0	120
5	6	9	Rick Mears	Penske Racing	66	+1 Lap	0	100
6	4	1	Tom Sneva	Team O'Connoell	66	+1 Lap	0	80
7	10	25	Danny Ongais	Team Field	66	+1 Lap	0	60
8	8	11	Tom Bagley	Team Hillin	65	+2 Lap	0	50
9	12	7	Steve Krisiloff	Fletcher Racing	64	+3 Laps	0	40
10	13	10	Pancho Carter	Team Morales	64	+3 Laps	0	30
11	15	92	John Mahler	Intercomp	63	+4 Laps	0	20
12	17	41	Bill Alsup	Private	60	+7 Laps	0	10
13	9	36	Mike Mosley	Team Gurney	51	engine	0	5
14	11	21	Lee Kunzman	Conqueste Racing Team	24	engine	0	5
15	5	4	Johnny Rutherford	Team McLaren	16	valve	0	5
16	14	35	Larry Rice	S&M Electric	8	handling	0	5
17	18	69	Joe Salanda	Hoffman Racing	5	engine	0	5
18	16	19	Spike Gehlhausen	Private	0	oil pressure	0	5

=== Lap Leader Breakdown ===
Leader	From Lap	To Lap	# Of Laps
Gordon Johncock	1	44	44
Bobby Unser	45	67	23

== Race 2 ==
(United States) 1979 Trenton Twin Indy - Race 2
Race details
- Race 6 of 14 in the 1979 CART season
- Trenton Speedway
- Date: June 10, 1979
- Official name: Trenton Twin Indy
- Location: Trenton Speedway, Hamilton Township, Mercer County, near Trenton, New Jersey Course = Oval
- Course: Permanent racing facility 1.5 mi / 2.41 km
- Distance: 67 laps 100.5 mi / 161.704 km
- Weather: Unknown

Pole position
- Driver: (United States) Bobby Unser (Team Penske)
- Time: Winner Race 1

Fastest lap
- Driver: Unknown (Unknown)
- Time: Unknown (on lap Unknown of 67)

Podium
- First: (United States) Bobby Unser (Team Penske)
- Second: (United States) Wally Dallenbach (Team Patrick)
- Third: (United States) Johnny Rutherford (Team McLaren)

=== Summary ===
Starting positions for the race were determined by finishes in the first race, putting Bobby Unser on the pole. In the race itself, Unser briefly lost the lead to Gordon Johncock on the first lap, but he took it back and except for 5 laps led by Pancho Carter controlled the rest of the race. Wally Dallenbach finished second, Johnny Rutherford in third, Tom Bagley in fourth, and Gordon Johncock in fifth.

=== Results ===
Pos	Sta	No	Driver	Team	Laps	Time/Retired	Led	Pts
1	1	12	Bobby Unser	Penske Racing	67	0:40:46	62	200
2	4	40	Wally Dallenbach	Patrick Racing	67		0	160
3	13	4	Johnny Rutherford	McLaren	67		0	140
4	8	11	Tom Bagley	Bobby Hillin	67		0	120
5	3	20	Gordon Johncock	Patrick Racing	66	+1 Lap	0	100
6	7	25	Danny Ongais	Ted Field	66	+1 Lap	0	80
7	5	9	Rick Mears	Penske Racing	66	+1 Lap	0	60
8	10	10	Pancho Carter	Alex Morales	65	+2 Laps	5	50
9	12	41	Bill Alsup	Private	62	+5 Laps	0	40
10	14	35	Larry Rice	Private	60	+7 Laps	0	30
11	11	92	John Mahler	Private	60	+7 Laps	0	20
12	2	2	Al Unser	Chaparral Cars	52	universal joint	0	10
13	16	19	Spike Gehlhausen	Carl Gehlhausen	52	oil line	0	5
14	9	7	Steve Krisiloff	Fletcher Racing	50	oil leak	0	5
15	6	1	Tom Sneva	Jerry O'Connell	41	suspension	0	5
16	15	69	Joe Saldana	Hoffman Racing	2	lost power	0	5

=== Lap leader breakdown ===
Leader	From Lap	To Lap	# Of Laps
Bobby Unser	1	26	26
Pancho Carder	27	31	5
Bobby Unser	32	67	36

=== Points standings after the Race ===
Note: Only top 10 are listed

Rank	Driver	Points	Diff	Change
1	Rick Mears	1725		=0
2	Bobby Unser	1275	-450	-1
3	Gordon Johncock	1140	-585	+1
4	Johnny Rutherford	875	-850	-1
5	Danny Ongais	853	-872	-1
6	Mike Mosley	835	-890	+2
7	Al Unser	640	-1085	=0
8	Tom Bagley	583	-1142	=0
9	Wally Dallenbach	468	-1257	-2
10	Tom Sneva	416	-1309	+1

Previous race: 1979 Indianapolis 500	SCCA/CART Indy Car Series; 1979 season	Next race: 1979 Norton Twin
Previous race: Not Held -	Trenton Twin Indy	Next race: 1979 Dizler 150; Same Season
