= 1970 California 500 =

American auto race

(United States) 1970 California 500
Race details
- Race 12 of 18 in the 1970 USAC Championship Car season
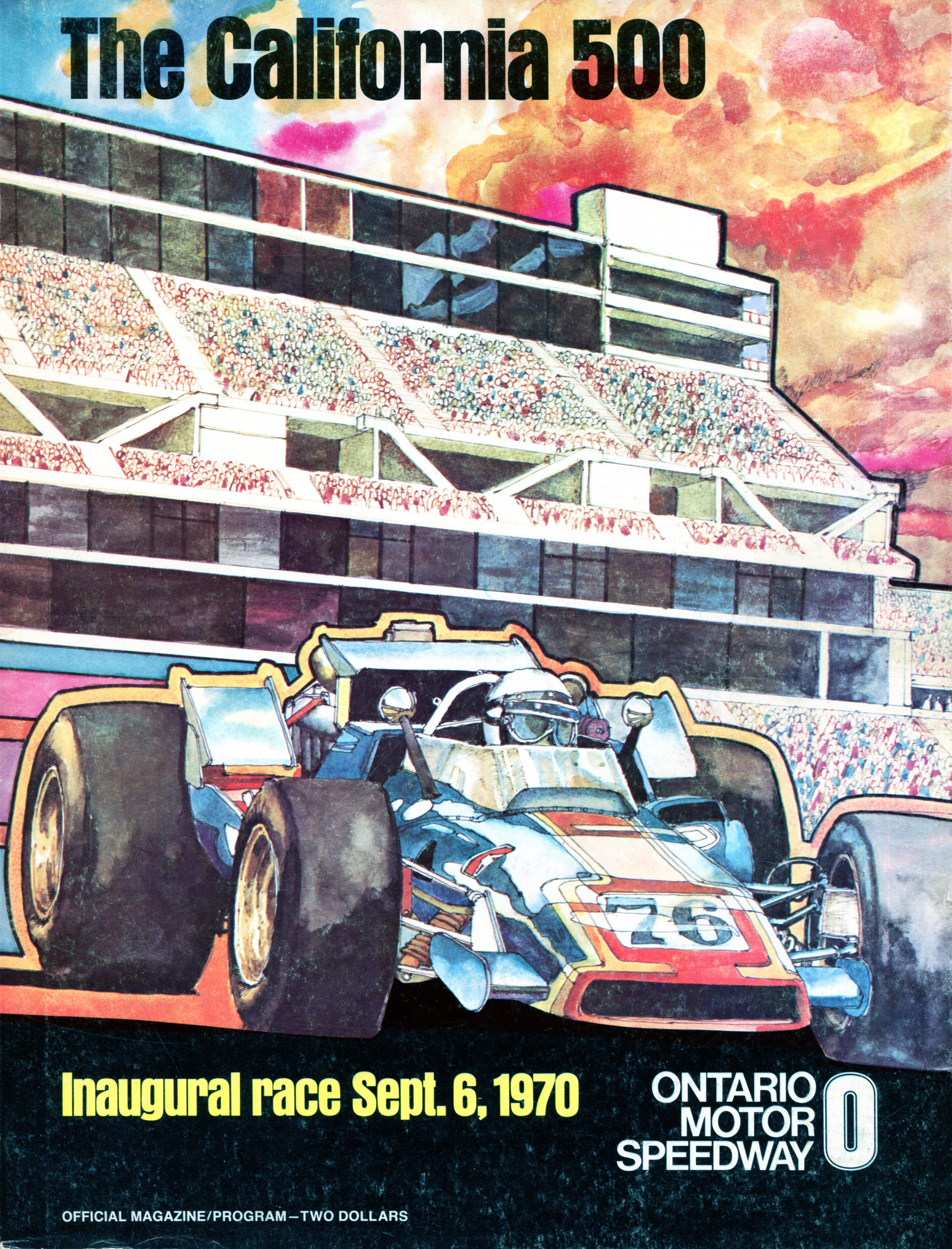
- Date: September 6, 1970
- Official name: 1970 California 500
- Location: Ontario Motor Speedway, Ontario, California, United States
- Course: Permanent racing facility 2.500 mi / 4.023 km
- Distance: 200 laps 500.000 mi / 804.672 km

Pole position
- Driver: (United States) Lloyd Ruby (Gene White)
- Time: 177.567 mph (285.766 km/h)

Podium
- First: (United States) Jim McElreath (A. J. Foyt Racing)
- Second: (United States) Art Pollard (Hayhoe Racing Enterprises)
- Third: (United States) Dick Simon (Racing International)

The 1970 California 500, the inaugural running of the event, was held at the Ontario Motor Speedway in Ontario, California, on Sunday, September 6, 1970. The event was race number 12 of 18 in the 1970 USAC Championship Car season. The race was won by Jim McElreath, his final Indy Car victory. The race commenced an 11-year history of the California 500 being a part of IndyCar racing's Triple Crown.

== Background ==
Plans for Ontario Motor Speedway were announced on February 16, 1966. Its primary financial backers were the Stolte Construction Company and Filmways Inc., a film production company that produced television shows such as The Beverly Hillbillies, Petticoat Junction, Green Acres, and The Addams Family. Upon the announcement, USAC agreed to sanction a pair of 500-mile races for Indy cars and stock cars. The inaugural race was scheduled for December 1, 1968.

Advertised as the "Indianapolis of the West", the track was similar in design to the Indianapolis Motor Speedway as a 2.5-mile oval with four distinct turns. In addition, the track would feature a 3.1-mile road course in the infield and a quarter-mile drag strip on the frontstretch. The track would have seating for over 150,000 spectators, standing room for 100,000 additional people, parking for 68,000 cars, and a control tower in the infield that stood 14 stories high.

The economy and bond market slowed in mid-1966 when funding was being raised, leading to delays in construction. Filmways withdrew from the project and eventually purchased Sears Point Raceway instead. In early 1967, Ontario informed USAC that construction would not be completed by the December 1968 target date. USAC responded by holding races at the nearby Riverside International Raceway between 1967 and 1969.

Once funding was secured through the selling of bonds, groundbreaking on the track officially took place on September 24, 1968. Dignitaries attending the ceremony included local officials and actor Kirk Douglas. Construction costs were anticipated to cost $25.5 million.

In 1969, USAC announced the California 500 would be held on the Sunday of Labor Day weekend for the next 10 years, beginning on September 6, 1970. USAC President, Charlie Brockman, declared "Ontario Motor Speedway is the most exciting and promising development in automobile racing since Tony Hulman bought the Indianapolis Speedway in 1946."

In May 1970, Al Unser won the Indianapolis 500.

Opening ceremonies for the track occurred on Sunday, August 9, 1970. Exhibitions of drag racing, stock car racing, and Indy car racing were done, followed by a Pro-Am celebrity race. Celebrities were teamed with pro drivers in new Porsches, with the pro driving three laps, the celebrity driving three laps, the pro again driving three laps, and the celebrities driving the final three laps. Professional drivers included Bobby Unser, Dan Gurney, Al Unser, Parnelli Jones, Mario Andretti, and Mark Donohue. Celebrities included Dick Smothers, Hugh Downs, Pancho Gonzalez, Paul Newman, James Garner, Pete Conrad, Dino Martin, and Ken Venturi. Unser and Smothers teamed to win the race followed by Donohue and Conrad.

== Practice and Time Trials ==
Practice for the California 500 officially opened on Saturday, August 22. 27,852 spectators attended the practice session, attracted by free admission. Only seven cars made practice runs. Mark Donohue posted the fastest speed at 165.14 mph. The six-hour practice session was delayed over an hour due to faulty caution lights on the backstretch. Kevin Bartlett was the first driver to go on track when practice began. Bartlett was also responsible for the only incident of the day when he spun in turn one but avoided any damage.

Donohue upped his speed to 169.81 mph on day two. On Monday, Donohue posted a speed of 171.4 mph. On Tuesday, the Vel's Parnelli Jones Racing teammates of Joe Leonard and Al Unser began practicing. Leonard posted the fastest speed at 172.41 mph. Practice ended one hour early as a dust storm covered the track.

On Wednesday, Leonard ran a speed of 175.10 mph. At speed, Mario Andretti's car lost a nose cone on the frontstretch. "It just popped off and flew right over my head. Otherwise it was no problem." For the second straight day, practice ended an hour early due to dust storms.

Leonard upped his speed to 177.2 mph on Thursday. Unser was second at 175.8 mph, followed by Johnny Rutherford at 175.4 mph. The first crash at the track occurred when Greg Weld spun in turn two and hit the wall broadside. The car was repaired. A $1 million lawsuit filed by George Follmer against USAC was settled. Follmer had been suspended for running two unauthorized Trans-Am races but was allowed to begin practicing on Friday.

Friday's practice saw Al Unser fastest at 176.8 mph. Dan Gurney was second at 176.1 mph. Joe Leonard suffered a fire when a fuel coupling broke on track. When he returned to the pits, the car ignited and he quickly jumped from the vehicle. Fire crews quickly extinguished the flames and Leonard suffered no burns, only singed hair on his legs. Jack Brabham practiced at 171.76 mph and left to run the Italian Grand Prix. He turned his car over to NASCAR racer Lee Roy Yarbrough, who was at the track as a spectator. Yarbrough's entry into the race forced him to withdraw from NASCAR's Southern 500.

=== Pole Day - Saturday August 29 ===
Like at Indianapolis, qualifying was a four-lap, ten-mile average. 63,486 spectators were on hand for the runs. Lloyd Ruby drew the first qualifying attempt and used the early, cool conditions to win the pole with an average speed of 177.567 mph. Ruby's fastest lap was 178.042 mph. The run was seven mph faster than Al Unser's pole speed at Indianapolis four months earlier. A. J. Foyt blew an engine 100 yards after completing his qualifying run. Dan Gurney was second at 176.401 mph. Johnny Rutherford completed the front row with a speed of 176.375 mph. Pre-qualifying favorite Joe Leonard blew an engine in morning practice. Strong winds during Leonard's qualifying run slowed his speed to 174.740 mph, sixth-fastest. Art Pollard spun exiting turn three on his third lap but didn't hit anything. Ruby's pole also carried a $12,800 prize. 29 cars posted speeds.

=== Bump Day - Sunday August 30 ===
The first nine rows of the grid were set on Saturday while the final day set the final two rows. In Sunday morning's practice session before qualifying, Bruce Walkup brushed the wall with the right side of his #98 car. He then moved to the #97 and qualified for the race. After hours of repairs, the #98 was fixed and Bill Puterbaugh was now the driver. In his first time on track, Puterbaugh hit the wall and severely damaged the right side. Jigger Sirois crashed his car at the exit of turn three.

George Snider had posted a speed of 169.753 mph on Saturday and was so sure that the speed would be safe enough to qualify that he returned to his home in Bakersfield. Snider was out riding his motorcycle when a call from the track to his wife expressed concern that he would be bumped from the field. Snider made the 150 mile trip from Bakersfield to Ontario in two hours and five minutes. Snider was bumped from the field by Greg Weld and attempted to requalify in a backup car. Snider was unable to bump his way back into the field.

Jim Hurtubise, in his front-engined roadster, held onto the 33rd and final starting position with an average speed of 169.101 mph.

== Race ==
Indianapolis Motor Speedway owner Tony Hulman delivered the command to start engines. 180,223 spectators attended the inaugural California 500. It was the largest crowd ever to see a sports event in California and the third-largest sports event in American sports history, behind only Indianapolis 500s and Indy 500 qualifying sessions.

For the first time, the cars used an electronic timing and scoring system. Developed by Conrac, transponders were placed on the cars which transmitted to antennas buried beneath the track. A. J. Foyt told officials he thought the transponder electrical signals would interfere with his car but USAC officials forced him to use it. Pitting with mechanical problems early in the race, Foyt got out of his car and knocked the transponder off his car with a hammer. He was manually scored for the rest of the race.

From his starting spot on the pole, Lloyd Ruby led the opening lap. Indianapolis champion, Al Unser, moved from fourth to take the lead on lap two. As Ruby retook the lead, at the rear of the field, Jim Hurtubise blew an engine and crashed in turn three. After being checked and released from the infield hospital, Hurtubise complained of head and rib pain and was taken to a local hospital, where he was treated overnight and released the next morning.

On the restart for Hurtubise's crash, Unser took the lead. From there, he was untouchable. Dan Gurney led for four laps when Unser made a pit stop on lap 47. Peter Revson led eight laps when Unser pitted on lap 139. At the halfway point, Gurney cut a tire in turn three and spun 360 degrees, impacting the wall with the right-rear wheel.

As the race entered the final hundred miles, Unser was in a lap of his own. Peter Revson in second and LeeRoy Yarbrough in third were Unser's closest competition a lap behind.

On lap 174, Joe Leonard spun into the infield in turn four and brought out a caution. Unser, Revson, and Yarbrough pitted for fuel. While stopped, Revson's engine shut off and wouldn't restart. His McLaren team took nine minutes to diagnose the problem as a bad coil. He recovered to finish fifth.

After leading 166 laps, Unser's car slowed to a stop with 14 laps remaining. Yarbrough inherited the lead. With a margin of two laps over second place, it appeared the stock car driver would score an unlikely victory. With eight laps remaining, Yarbrough suffered a broken piston and blew an engine, coasting to a stop in turn four. Yarbrough drew cheers from the crowd as he pushed his car back to the pits.

After starting 32nd, Art Pollard inherited the lead upon Yarbrough's retirement with eight laps to go. Jim McElreath was in second. Almost at the same time as Yarbrough's failure, McElreath's car-owner, A.J. Foyt, crashed in turn four. Uninjured, Foyt helped safety crews push his car off the track to ensure a green flag finish.

When the green flag was waved with five laps to go, McElreath pulled to the inside of Pollard entering turn one and took the lead. With three laps remaining, McElreath bobbled in turn three and allowed Pollard to take the lead. One turn later, Pollard overdrove the turn and drifted high, allowing McElreath to retake the lead. McElreath led the rest of the way and won by two seconds over Pollard.

McElreath earned $146,850 for the victory. Governor of California, Ronald Reagan presented the trophy in victory lane to McElreath. Pollard's team protested the finish, claiming they were a lap ahead of McElreath but USAC's scoring confirmed McElreath as the winner. Pre-race concerns about tire wear were unfounded, with McElreath changing only one tire during the race and Pollard running all 500 miles without ever changing tires.

President Richard Nixon flew over the track in a helicopter during the race. Nixon had been staying at his California home, dubbed the Western White House for the past 18 days. That afternoon, he took a helicopter to visit his 90-year-old aunt at a nursing home and surveyed two potential sites for his Presidential Library. The President made a few circles over the race before returning to his home and back to Washington D.C. later that evening. The sights encouraged the President to invite auto racing participants to the White House on September 21, 1971.

== Box score ==
Finish	Grid	No	Name	Entrant	Chassis	Engine	Laps	Time/Status	Led	Points
1	18	14	(United States) Jim McElreath	Ansted-Thompson Racing	Coyote	Ford	200	3:07:22.550	5	1000
2	32	64	(United States) Art Pollard	Hayhoe Racing Enterprises	Scorpion 70	Ford	200	+1.950	4	800
3	27	44	(United States) Dick Simon	Racing International	Vollstedt	Ford	200	Running	0	700
4	11	5	(United States) Gordon Johncock	Johncock Racing Team	McLaren M15	Offenhauser	200	Running	0	600
5	10	75	(United States) Peter Revson	Team McLaren	McLaren M15	Offenhauser	200	Running	8	500
6	20	6	(United States) Mel Kenyon	Lindsey Hopkins Racing	Eagle	Ford	198	Flagged	0	400
7	30	41	(United States) Greg Weld	Grant King Racers	King	Offenhauser	195	Flagged	0	300
8	9	32	(United States) LeeRoy Yarbrough	Motor Racing Development	Brabham BT32	Offenhauser	191	Engine	5	250
9	4	2	(United States) Al Unser	Vel's Parnelli Jones Racing	Colt 70	Ford	186	Transmission	166	200
10	8	1	(United States) Mario Andretti	Andy Granatelli	McNamara T500	Ford	182	Engine	0	150
11	16	31	(United States) Jim Malloy	Federal Engineering	Gerhardt	Offenhauser	179	Flagged	0	100
12	31	65	(United States) Carl Williams	Ernest L Ruiz	Gerhardt	Offenhauser	179	Engine	0	50
13	6	15	(United States) Joe Leonard	Vel's Parnelli Jones Racing	Colt 70	Ford	168	Spun out	0	0
14	15	9	(United States) Mike Mosley	Leader Card Racers	Eagle	Offenhauser	147	Turbocharger	0	0
15	7	7	(United States) A. J. Foyt	Ansted-Thompson Racing	Coyote	Ford	131	Crash	0	0
16	28	97	(United States) Bruce Walkup	Agajanian-Faas Racers	Mongoose	Offenhauser	117	Overheating	0	0
17	17	99	(United States) Bob Harkey	Joe Hunt	Gerhardt	Offenhauser	100	Piston	0	0
18	2	48	(United States) Dan Gurney	All American Racers	Eagle	Offenhauser	98	Crash	5	0
19	5	16	(United States) Gary Bettenhausen	Don Gerhardt	Gerhardt	Offenhauser	93	Piston	0	0
20	29	20	(United States) George Follmer	Andy Granatelli	Brawner Hawk III	Ford	76	Oil tank	0	0
21	21	89	(United States) Jerry Grant	Jerry Grant Racing	Eagle	Offenhauser	63	Ignition	0	0
22	12	3	(United States) Bobby Unser	Leader Card Racers	Eagle	Ford	45	Valve	0	0
23	1	25	(United States) Lloyd Ruby	Gene White Co.	Laycock	Offenhauser	42	Engine	7	0
24	26	92	(United States) Bud Tingelstad	Jerry O'Connell Racing	Brabham BT25	Offenhauser	40	Pinion gear	0	0
25	24	11	(United States) Roger McCluskey	Hayhoe Racing Enterprises	Scorpion	Ford	26	Valve	0	0
26	22	12	(Australia) Kevin Bartlett	Gene White Co.	Laycock	Ford	16	Piston	0	0
27	23	42	(United States) Swede Savage	All American Racers	Eagle	Ford	13	Ignition	0	0
28	14	22	(United States) Wally Dallenbach	Lindsey Hopkins Racing	Eagle	Offenhauser	10	Piston	0	0
29	19	86	(United States) Steve Krisiloff	Leader Card Racers	Eagle	Offenhauser	8	Magneto	0	0
30	13	66	(United States) Mark Donohue	Penske Racing	Lola T153	Ford	7	Piston	0	0
31	3	18	(United States) Johnny Rutherford	Mitchner Petroleum	Eagle	Offenhauser	5	Piston	0	0
32	33	56	(United States) Jim Hurtubise	Jim Hurtubise	Mallard	Offenhauser	1	Crash	0	0
33	25	38	(United States) Rick Muther	Jim Hurtubise	Brawner Hawk	Offenhauser	1	Valve	0	0

== Broadcasting ==
Like the Indianapolis 500, the California 500 was broadcast on closed-circuit television at select theaters across the country. Keith Jackson and Alan Courtney were the announcers. The coverage was panned by critics over its lack of replays, failure to notice spins, a mere two interviews with drivers, and not realizing Jim McElreath was in the lead until three laps remaining.

Previous race: 1970 Tony Bettenhausen 200	USAC Championship Car; 1970 season	Next race: 1970 Ted Horn Memorial
Previous race: —	California 500	Next race: 1971 California 500
