= 1973 USAC Championship Car season =

Sports season

- USAC National Championship Trail

Season
- Races: 16
- Start date: April 7
- End date: November 3

Awards
- National champion: (United States) Roger McCluskey
- Indianapolis 500 winner: (United States) Gordon Johncock

The 1973 USAC Championship Car season consisted of 16 races, beginning in College Station, Texas on April 7 and concluding in Avondale, Arizona on November 3. The first race of the season, in Avondale, Arizona on March 17, was postponed by rain and eventually cancelled due to infrastructure damage caused by the rain and scheduling conflicts. Bob Criss was killed in a private test at Phoenix before he could enter another event. He was 35 years old. The USAC National Champion was Roger McCluskey and the Indianapolis 500 winner was Gordon Johncock.

In this tragic season, two drivers were killed at the Indianapolis Motor Speedway. Art Pollard died in an accident while practicing for the Indy 500 while Swede Savage, who crashed during the race, died by complications one month later. Another driver, Salt Walther, suffered serious burns surviving a crash at the start of the race. In response to those accidents, USAC revised the rules in time for the Pocono 500. The rear wing width was cut back from 64 inches to 55, fuel tank capacity was drastically reduced (from 75 gallons to 40) and the allowable fuel to be consumed in a 500-mile race was reduced from 375 gallons to 340.

== Entrants ==
(partial list)

Team	Chassis	Engine	Drivers	Rounds
(United States) A.J. Foyt Enterprises	Coyote	Foyt	(United States) A.J. Foyt	1-4, 6-8, 11-15
(United States) All American Racers	Eagle	Offenhauser	(United States) Wally Dallenbach	4
(United States) All American Racers	Eagle	Offenhauser	(United States) Bobby Unser	1-8, 11-16
(United States) Bob Fletcher	Eagle	Offenhauser	(United States) Lee Kunzman	10-12, 14-16
(United States) Commander Racing Team	Eagle	Offenhauser	(United States) Lloyd Ruby	1, 4-8, 10-16
(United States) Andy Granatelli	Eagle	Offenhauser	(United States) Wally Dallenbach	1-2, 5-9, 11-12, 14-16
(United States) Gerhardt	Eagle	Offenhauser	(United States) Mike Hiss	1-9, 11-15
(United States) Jerry O"Connell Racing	Eagle	Offenhauser	(United States) Bill Vukovich II	1-9, 11-16
(United States) Leader Card Racing	Eagle	Offenhauser	(United States) Mike Mosley	1-8, 10-16
(United States) Lindsey Hopkins Racing	McLaren	Offenhauser	(United States) Roger McCluskey	1-9, 11-12, 14-16
(United States) Lindsey Hopkins Racing	Eagle	Offenhauser	(United States) Lee Kunzman	1-7
(United Kingdom) McLaren	McLaren	Offenhauser	(United States) Johnny Rutherford	1-2, 4-8, 10-16
(United States) Patrick Racing	Eagle	Offenhauser	(United States) Gordon Johncock	1-9, 11-12, 14-16
(United States) Team Penske	McLaren	Offenhauser	(United States) Gary Bettenhausen	1-8, 10-16
(United States) Vel's Parnelli Jones Racing	Parnelli	Offenhauser	(United States) Mario Andretti	1-8, 10-16
(United States) Vel's Parnelli Jones Racing	Parnelli	Offenhauser	(United States) Al Unser	1-8, 10-12, 14-16
(United States) Vel's Parnelli Jones Racing	Parnelli	Offenhauser	(United States) Joe Leonard	1-9, 11-16

== Schedule and results ==
All races running on Oval/Speedway.

Rnd	Date	Race name	Track	Location	Pole position	Winning driver
-	March 17 & 31^{A}	Phoenix 150	Phoenix International Raceway	Avondale, Arizona	Race postponed twice; eventually cancelled	
1	April 7	Texas 200	Texas World Speedway	College Station, Texas	(United States) Bobby Unser	(United States) Al Unser
2	April 15	Trentonian 300 Heat #1	Trenton International Speedway	Trenton, New Jersey	(United States) Gordon Johncock	(United States) A. J. Foyt
3	April 15	Trentonian 300 Heat #2	Trenton International Speedway	Trenton, New Jersey	(United States) A. J. Foyt	(United States) Mario Andretti
4	May 28, 29 & 30^{B}	International 500 Mile Sweepstakes	Indianapolis Motor Speedway	Speedway, Indiana	(United States) Johnny Rutherford	(United States) Gordon Johncock
5	June 10	Rex Mays Classic	Wisconsin State Fair Park Speedway	West Allis, Wisconsin	(United States) Bobby Unser	(United States) Bobby Unser
6	July 1	Schaefer 500	Pocono International Raceway	Long Pond, Pennsylvania	(United States) Peter Revson	(United States) A. J. Foyt
7	July 15	Michigan 200	Michigan International Speedway	Brooklyn, Michigan	(United States) Bobby Unser	(United States) Roger McCluskey
8	August 12	Tony Bettenhausen 200	Wisconsin State Fair Park Speedway	West Allis, Wisconsin	(United States) Wally Dallenbach Sr.	(United States) Wally Dallenbach Sr.
9	August 26	California 500 Qualification Heat 1	Ontario Motor Speedway	Ontario, California	(United States) Gordon Johncock	(United States) Wally Dallenbach Sr.
10	August 26	California 500 Qualification Heat 2	Ontario Motor Speedway	Ontario, California	(United States) Johnny Rutherford	(United States) Johnny Rutherford
11	September 2	California 500	Ontario Motor Speedway	Ontario, California	(United States) Peter Revson	(United States) Wally Dallenbach Sr.
12	September 16	Michigan Twin 125s #1	Michigan International Speedway	Brooklyn, Michigan	(United States) Gordon Johncock	(United States) Bill Vukovich II
13	September 16	Michigan Twin 125s #2	Michigan International Speedway	Brooklyn, Michigan	(United States) Gary Bettenhausen	(United States) Johnny Rutherford
14	September 23	Trenton 200	Trenton International Speedway	Trenton, New Jersey	(United States) Gordon Johncock	(United States) Gordon Johncock
15	October 6	Texas 200	Texas World Speedway	College Station, Texas	(United States) Mario Andretti	(United States) Gary Bettenhausen
16	November 3	Arizona 150	Phoenix International Raceway	Avondale, Arizona	(United States) Gordon Johncock	(United States) Gordon Johncock

^A Postponed due to infrastructure damage, and again on March 28 due to continued flooding. Eventually cancelled due to scheduling conflicts.
^B Scheduled for 500 miles, stopped early due to rain. See 1973 Indy 500

== Final points standings ==
Note: Sam Posey, Peter Revson, Mark Donohue, David Hobbs, Jerry Grant, John Cannon, Graham McRae and Bobby Allison are not eligible for points. The Rookie of the Year was not awarded, because every rookie was not eligible for points.

Pos	Driver	TWS	TRE		INDY	MIL	POC	MIS	MIL	ONT			MIS		TRE	TWS	PHX	Pts
Pos	Driver	200	150		500	150	500	200	200	Q-H1	Q-H2	500	125		200	200	150	Pts
1	(United States) Roger McCluskey	7	8	6	3	2	2	1	6	2		4	4		13	18	4	3705
2	(United States) Wally Dallenbach Sr.	DNQ	DNQ		24	4	29	6	**1**	1		1	23		3	6	2	2620
3	(United States) Johnny Rutherford	4	15		**9**	5	5	2	18		**1**	31	3	1	4	2	Wth	2595
4	(United States) Bill Vukovich II	15	3	2	2	22	24	3	3	12		24	1	15	6	20	3	2440
5	(United States) Mario Andretti	25	4	1	30	8	7	5	19		12	2	5	2	7	**17**	7	2400
6	(United States) Mike Mosley	3	9	8	10	24	4	10	2		5	3	18		14	23	20	2345
7	(United States) Gordon Johncock	23	**2**	21	1	18	14	9	17	**5**		32	**16**		**1**	7	**1**	2240
8	(United States) Gary Bettenhausen	2	6	17	5	3	27	24	20		2	19	2	**8**	24	1	6	2093
9	(United States) Lloyd Ruby	DNQ			27	21	3	4	DNQ		8	28	6	4	8	4	11	1610
10	(United States) A. J. Foyt	11	1	**11**	25		1	13	25			10	13	14	20	10		1580
11	(United States) Lee Kunzman	8	11	9	7	6	20	12			3	13	20		10	3	5	1260
12	(United States) Bobby Unser	**20**	19	15	13	**1**	10	**20**	DNQ			7	10	16	2	15	18	1108
13	(United States) Al Unser	1	7	3	20	9	33	22	26		4	9	21		25	16	19	1080
14	(United States) Mike Hiss	22	14	13	17	10	6	25	5	3		27	9	3	21	11		1050
15	(United States) Joe Leonard	5	13	5	18	7	8	23	7	9		21	12	7	9	19	15	1018
16	(United States) Mel Kenyon	12	12	10	4		18	8	9			16		DNQ		9		940
17	(United States) John Martin				8	13	28	7		13		5						870
18	(United States) Steve Krisiloff	DNS	18		6	16	22	18	21		6	12	7	6	11	8	21	845
19	(United States) Jim McElreath				23	11	11		4	6		20			5		16	650
20	(United States) Dick Simon	6	10	7	14	17	12	17	22		11	22	DNS		23	21	8	440
21	(United States) Jimmy Caruthers	21	16		21	12	16	19	8	4		15	8	9	22	DNS	9	408
22	(United States) Johnny Parsons				DNQ		30	14	13		9	25	11	5	15	5	22	390
23	(United States) Bentley Warren		21	16	DNQ		DNQ		16		7	8		DNQ	12	22	10	375
24	(United States) Swede Savage	13	5	4	22													330
25	(United States) Tom Bigelow				DNQ	14	32	15		7		11						160
26	(United States) Lee Brayton	10	17	12	DNQ	15						DNQ	15	10	16	12	17	133
27	(United States) Sam Sessions	9	DNQ		28		13	11	23			DNQ						120
28	(United States) John Hubbard		DNQ			19		DNQ	10				14	12				73
29	(United States) John Mahler				Wth					8		26						50
30	(United States) Jerry Karl				26	23	26		11			18					DNQ	40
31	(United States) Tom Sneva R	26	DNQ		DNQ		DNQ		21	14		10	17		19		14	30
32	(United States) George Snider				12		25					14					12	29
33	(United States) Larry Cannon				DNQ	DNQ							16	11	17	14		25
34	(United States) Jigger Sirois				DNQ	Wth			12				DNS	13	DNQ			20
-	(United States) Sam Posey				DNQ		9			11		6						0
-	(Canada) John Cannon									10		30						0
-	(United Kingdom) David Hobbs				11		31				13	DNQ						0
-	(United States) Bob Harkey				29		15									DNQ	13	0
-	(Canada) Eldon Rasmussen		DNQ				DNQ									13		0
-	(United States) Larry McCoy	14	20	14	DNQ	DNQ	DNQ	26	15				22		26	24		0
-	(United States) Bill Simpson				DNQ						14	DNQ				26		0
-	(United States) Mark Donohue				15		17		DNQ			29						0
-	(United States) Al Loquasto		DNQ		DNQ		DNQ	16	24			DNQ	19		18			0
-	(United States) Salt Walther	16	22		33													0
-	(New Zealand) Graham McRae R				16							DNQ						0
-	(United States) Dee Jones	17	24	19	Wth													0
-	(United States) Rick Muther	18			DNQ		19						DNQ		DNQ	25		0
-	(United States) Crockey Peterson		23	18		20												0
-	(United States) Jerry Grant				19							33						0
-	(United States) Art Pollard	19	DNQ		Wth													0
-	(United States) Joe Tetz		DNQ	20														0
-	(United States) Peter Revson				31		**21**					**23**						0
-	(United States) Jim Hurtubise				DNQ		23					DNQ						0
-	(United States) Larry Dickson	24			Wth													0
-	(United States) Bobby Allison R				32													0
-	(United States) Gig Stephens		DNS															0
-	(United States) Billy Shuman		DNQ															0
-	(United States) Arnie Knepper				DNQ													0
-	(United States) Bill Puterbaugh				DNQ													0
-	(United States) Greg Weld				DNQ													0
-	(United States) Dan Murphy								DNQ									0
-	(United States) Benny Rapp												DNQ					0
Pos	Driver	TWS1 200	TRE1 150	TRE2 150	INDY 500	MIL1 150	POC 500	MIS1 200	MIL2 200	ONT Q-H1	ONT Q-H2	ONT 500	MIS2 125	MIS3 125	TRE3 200	TWS2 200	PHX 150	Pts

Color	Result
Gold	Winner
Silver	2nd place
Bronze	3rd place
Green	4th & 5th place
Light Blue	6th-10th place
Dark Blue	Finished (Outside Top 10)
Purple	Did not finish (Ret)
Red	Did not qualify (DNQ)
Brown	Withdrawn (Wth)
Black	Disqualified (DSQ)
White	Did not start (DNS)
Blank	Did not participate (DNP)
Blank	Not competing

**In-line notation**
**Bold**	Pole position
Italics	Ran fastest race lap
*	Led most race laps
RY Rookie of the Year
R Rookie

== See also ==
- 1973 Indianapolis 500
