= Lindsey Hopkins Jr. =

American sportsman car owner and businessman

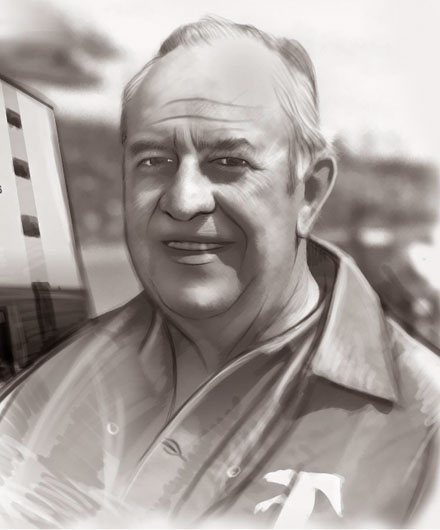
- Born: March 10, 1908; Greensboro, North Carolina, U.S.
- Died: February 14, 1986 (aged 77); Atlanta, Georgia, U.S.
- Known for: Coca-Cola; Auto Racing; Banking; Northern Trust Corporation
- Spouse: Dorothy Smith Hopkins
- Parent: Lindsey Hopkins Sr.

Lindsey Hopkins Jr. (March 10, 1908 – February 14, 1986) was an American businessman and auto racing team owner involved in open-wheel racing. He built a career in commercial and industrial banking, owning homes in Miami and Atlanta, where he had close ties to Coca-Cola. He also owned a chain of hotels in the Bahamas.

== Early life ==
Hopkins was born in Greensboro, North Carolina in 1908. His father was the businessman and philanthropist Lindsey Hopkins Sr.

Hopkins attended the University of Georgia.

Hopkins was married to Dorothy Smith Hopkins, who was an accomplished pianist.

== Business activities ==
=== Auto racing ===
Hopkins was a sportsman car owner who continued entering cars at Indianapolis 500 races even when he could not obtain sponsorships. Through the years, Hopkins's entries did not always carry sponsorship nor did they need to as he was purported to be the second largest Coca-Cola stockholder but as costs of racing increased through the years, Hopkins found sponsors. A regular from 1951 through 1982, fielding as many as four cars in some years, he won 11 American Automobile Association or United States Auto Club National Championship races. In 1971, the Hopkins team used a Kuzma rear engine chassis modified by the Kenyon brothers, powered by a turbocharged Ford engine.

Hopkins’ first Indianapolis 500 car was a dirt track machine obtained from Lou Moore in June 1950. Henry Banks drove it to that year's American Automobile Association National title as well as to second place in 1951.

Longtime Lindsey Hopkins Racing driver Roger McCluskey won the 1972 California 500 in Ontario, California, and the United States Auto Club National Championship in 1973. Hopkins's team of drivers included Jim Rathmann (second at Indianapolis in 1957 and 1959), Bill Vukovich, A. J. Foyt, Lloyd Ruby, Bobby Marshman, Don Branson, Tony Bettenhausen, Gary Bettenhausen, Wally Dallenbach, Pat O’Connor, and George Amick, among numerous others. He was inducted into the Indianapolis Motor Speedway Hall of Fame.

Hopkins continued to live up to his role as a gentleman sportsman as he entered cars in the Indianapolis 500 up until his death in February 1986. Through the years, Hopkins never won the ‘500,’ and was touched by tragedy several times, first when Bill Vukovich died in 1955 behind the wheel of the Hopkins Special while leading the Indianapolis ‘500.’ However, even his friend Bill's death did not dim Hopkins’ appetite for racing. In his words: “Bill wouldn’t have wanted me to quit.”In addition, Hopkins was an accomplished amateur magician. As a result, his cars featured a logo of a top hat and “Thurston” the rabbit.

==== IndyCar wins ====
#	Season	Date	Sanction	Track / Race	No.	Winning driver	Chassis	Engine	Tire	Grid	Laps Led
1	1950	September 10	AAA	Michigan State Fairgrounds Speedway (DO)	8	(United States) Henry Banks	Moore	Offenhauser L4 270 ci	Firestone	3	12
2	1956	November 12	USAC	Arizona State Fairgrounds (DO)	78	(United States) George Amick	1952 Lesovsky D	Offenhauser L4 270 ci	Firestone	Pole	100
3	1957	July 4	USAC	Lakewood Speedway (DO)	78	(United States) George Amick (2)	1952 Lesovsky D	Offenhauser L4 252 ci	Firestone	3	96
4	1957	August 25	USAC	Milwaukee Mile (O)	26	(United States) Jim Rathmann	1957 Epperly FE	Offenhauser L4 252 ci	Firestone	5	123
5	1959	April 4	USAC	Daytona International Speedway (O)	16	(United States) Jim Rathmann (2)	1959 Watson FE	Offenhauser L4 252 ci	Firestone	2	35
NC	1959	April 4	USAC	Daytona International Speedway (O)	16	(United States) Jim Rathmann	1959 Watson FE	Offenhauser L4 252 ci	Firestone	2	17
6	1959	October 18	USAC	Arizona State Fairgrounds (DO)	16	(United States) Tony Bettenhausen	Kuzma D	Offenhauser L4 252 ci	Firestone	8	55
7	1962	November 18	USAC	Arizona State Fairgrounds (DO)	1	(United States) Bobby Marshman	1961 Kuzma D	Offenhauser L4 252 ci	Firestone	4	21
8	1966	August 7	USAC	Langhorne Speedway (O)	8	(United States) Roger McCluskey	Eagle 66	Ford Indy DOHC V8	Goodyear	2	142
9	1968	August 17	USAC	Springfield Mile (DO)	8	(United States) Roger McCluskey (2)	1961 Kuzma D	Offenhauser L4 252 ci	Goodyear	4	28
10	1972	September 3	USAC	Ontario Motor Speedway (O)	14	(United States) Roger McCluskey (3)	McLaren M16A	Offenhauser L4t 159 ci	Goodyear	8	40
11	1973	July 15	USAC	Michigan (O)	3	(United States) Roger McCluskey (4)	McLaren M16B	Offenhauser L4t 159 ci	Goodyear	4	29

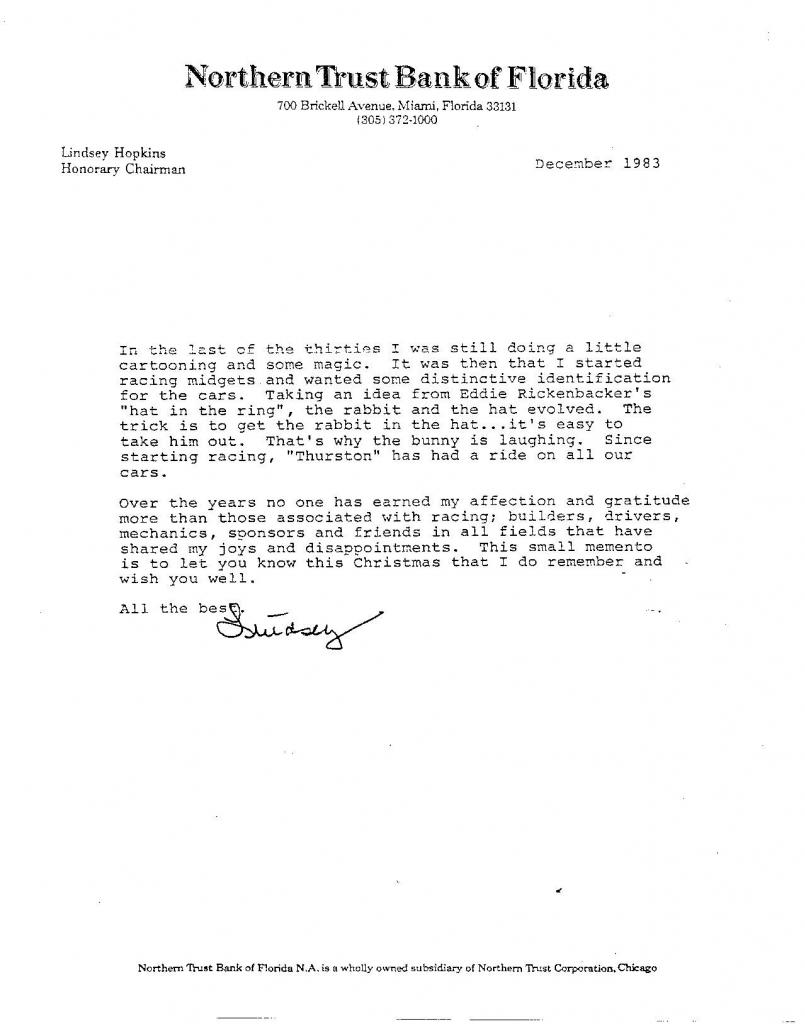
Lindsey Hopkins Letter

=== Football ===
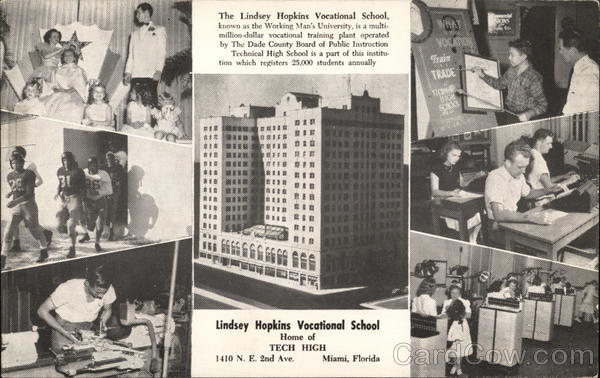
Lindsey Hopkins Technical College

Auto racing was not Hopkins' only interest. In 1967, he and fellow car owner John Mecom Jr bought the new franchise of the New Orleans Saints football team. He was also part owner of the Atlanta Falcons.

=== Coca-Cola Company ===
Hopkins was elected to the board of the Coca-Cola Co. in March 1954, and filled the vacancy resulting from the death of Mrs. Lettle P. Evans.

=== Real estate ===
Lindsey Hopkins Jr. was President of Montauk Beach Company Inc. Mr. Hopkins was also head of a corporation which owned and operated Coral Harbour, multi-million dollar club and residential development in the Bahamas.

=== Banking ===
Hopkins founded Security Trust Company in 1938, which held the majority of the common stock and all of the preferred stock in the Montauk Beach Company. The firm provided trust and estate management services, but was not engaged in commercial banking functions. Security Trust Company was acquired by Nortrust Corp. of Chicago in December 1971 and became Northern Trust Bank of Florida.

=== Roosevelt Hotel Miami (Lindsey Hopkins Technical College) ===
The construction of Roosevelt Hotel was started by Fred Rand, which was slated to be a $2,750,000 Hotel, and was supposed to have 560 rooms. However, the Roosevelt Hotel Project was left unfinished in 1926, and its unfinished walls and rude interior furnished a haven for hobos and the homeless of 10 years, while two hurricanes did their unsuccessful best to ruin it.

In 1936 the Roosevelt Hotel was acquired by Lindsey Hopkins Sr., Hopkins' father to both repair and finish. Over one million dollars was spent to complete the Roosevelt Hotel.

Upon the passing of Lindsey Hopkins Sr., the building was sold for only $225,000 to the Miami Dade Public Schools by Hopkins Jr. and renamed in honor of his father. Located in the heart of Miami's "Healthcare District", it is now known as Lindsey Hopkins Technical College.

“Dad was a farm boy, from Reidsville, NC., and his first job brought him 50 cents a week. He wasn’t a college graduate, though he studied a little at Chapel Hill, at the University of North Carolina. He was a self-made man, and a self-educated man. He did a good job, because I have met few men who had, a better education – he read widely – he did it himself. The school that carries his name would have made him very proud.”

— Lindsey Hopkins Jr.
