= Swede Savage =

American racing driver (1946–1973)

- Born: David Earl Savage Jr. August 26, 1946 San Bernardino, California, U.S.
- Died: July 2, 1973 (aged 26) Indianapolis, Indiana, U.S.

Champ Car career
- 28 races run over 5 years
- Years active: 1969–1973
- Best finish: 18th – 1971
- First race: 1969 Brainerd Heat 1 (Brainerd)
- Last race: 1973 Indianapolis 500 (Indianapolis)
- First win: 1970 Bobby Ball 150 (Phoenix)
Wins	Podiums	Poles
1	3	0

David Earl "Swede" Savage Jr. (August 26, 1946 – July 2, 1973) was an American race car driver. He died at age 26 from complications while recovering from injuries suffered in a crash during the 1973 Indianapolis 500, nearly five weeks earlier.

== Early life ==
Born and raised in San Bernardino, California, Savage was the eldest son of David Earl Savage Sr. and Joetta Taylor Savage. He began Soap Box Derby racing at the age of five, moved up to racing quarter midget cars, then at age twelve to Go-Kart racing. By his mid-teens he was racing motorcycles competitively.

Savage was honored as an all-state high school football player at San Bernardino's Pacific High School as a junior, but was ruled ineligible for his senior year because he had accepted prize money racing motorcycles and was therefore ruled a professional athlete.

== Racing career ==
In January 1967, Savage made a point of showing up at a Ford Motor Company test session at Riverside International Raceway attended by, among others, racing legend Dan Gurney. Also in attendance was a Ford public relations executive named Monte Roberts, who watched Savage calmly wheelie a motorcycle for the better part of a mile and, struck by Savage's "racy" name and obvious talent, encouraged Ford officials to take Savage under their wing. After a partial season driving NASCAR stock cars in the South for the Ford factory-backed racing team Holman-Moody, Savage received a telephone call from Gurney inviting him back to Southern California to try his hand at sports car racing.

Savage debuted in the old SCCA United States Road Racing Championship (USRRC) series in April 1968, driving a Lola T70 Mk III, the car campaigned by Gurney in the 1967 Can-Am racing series. A condition of employment Gurney imposed on the young driver was that he rebuild and prepare the car for competition with very little assistance from other staff at All American Racers (AAR). Savage finished fifth at Riverside in his one appearance in the car. In 1968 and 1969, he also raced in NASCAR events. Competing in the 1969 Daytona 500, he crashed after a wheel fell off on lap 124. With AAR's racing program cut back due to budget troubles, Savage resumed semi-pro motorcycle racing in the Southern California area. In 1970, Savage and Gurney drove identical factory-sponsored Plymouth Barracudas in the Trans-Am Series. Early in the season, Chrysler cut back support for the AAR effort and Gurney stepped out of the car to let Savage drive the entire season.

Driving an Eagle-Ford IndyCar, Savage won the Bobby Ball Memorial, a 150-mile race at Phoenix International Raceway on November 21, 1970. This was his sole professional auto racing victory. In March 1971, Savage entered the Questor Grand Prix at Ontario Motor Speedway, driving an Eagle-Plymouth Formula 5000 car. Savage suffered near-fatal head injuries in the ensuing crash. He returned to driving in August at the Trans-Am event at Watkins Glen.

Savage competed in the Indianapolis 500 twice; in his debut in 1972, he finished 32nd after dropping out on lap six with mechanical problems.

=== 1973 Indianapolis 500 crash and subsequent death ===
In the 1973 Indianapolis 500, Savage was entered in an STP-sponsored Eagle-Offenhauser (number 40) prepared by master mechanic George Bignotti. He had been the fastest driver for much of practice. On the first day of qualifying, gusting winds slowed Savage from matching his best practice speeds, but he still shattered the track record with a four-lap qualifying average of 196.582 mph (316.368 km/h). Later in the day, as the winds abated, Johnny Rutherford, Bobby Unser, and Mark Donohue each bettered Savage's time.

The race was delayed two days due to rain, and was run on Wednesday, May 30. Savage held the lead for laps 43–54, and then made his first pit stop. He rejoined in second place, closely behind Al Unser and just ahead of Bobby Unser. In his autobiography, Bobby Unser wrote that when Savage exited the pits, he became alarmed at how hard Savage was pushing, and dropped back slightly in anticipation of an incident.

On lap 58, just behind Al Unser (who was about to make a pit stop of his own), Savage, pushing hard in anticipation of a coming rainstorm, lost control as he exited turn four. Savage's car twitched back and forth, then slid across to the inside of the track at almost top speed, hitting the angled inside wall nearly head-on. The force of the impact, with the car carrying a full load of fuel, caused the car to explode in a 60-foot (18 m)-high plume of flame.

Savage, still strapped in his seat in a large piece of the car, was thrown back across the circuit. He came to rest adjacent to the outer retaining wall, fully conscious and completely exposed while he lay in a pool of flaming methanol fuel. Anchoring the event live for tape delay broadcast later in the day, ABC Sports broadcaster Jim McKay expressed disbelief upon seeing that Savage was actually moving in the post crash wreckage while he was engulfed in flames.

The exact cause of Savage's sudden turn across the race track and into the infield wall has not been settled. Television footage seems to show the right half of his rear wing had come loose, which would instantly change the downforce on the wheels and could explain the sudden back and forth twitching of the car. A second theory is provided by numerous drivers complaining over their radios about oil on the track, as pole sitter Rutherford had been given the black flag for dropping fluid, most likely oil. Among those complaining about oil on the track was Jerry Grant, in an interview with Dave Diles of ABC Sports while the wreckage from Savage's crash was cleaned off the track. Diles was later filmed wiping oil off the front of Joe Leonard's car to prove the point, though Bobby Unser (who did not get along well with Savage and often ridiculed the driving ability of the younger driver) disputed that the drivers were running on an unsafe racetrack.

A young crew member for Savage's Patrick Racing teammate Graham McRae, Armando Teran, ran out across the pit lane in an effort to come to Savage's aid and was struck by a fire truck rushing up pit road at 60 mph (100 km/h) (opposite the normal direction of travel) to the crash; Teran was killed instantly.

Savage was burned on his arms, face, and right hand, and received fractures to both of his legs.

Savage joked with medical personnel after the wreck, and was expected to live when taken to Methodist Hospital and for some time thereafter. However, he died in the hospital 33 days after the accident.

The true cause of his death remains a point of dispute. It had been widely reported that Savage's death was caused by lung and kidney complications, but Steve Olvey, Savage's attending physician at Indy (and later CART's director of medical affairs), claimed in his book Rapid Response that the real cause of death was complications related to contaminated plasma. Lung failure was repeated as the cause of death by Savage's daughter Angela in a May 2015 interview. Savage's death certificate lists his cause of death as "Septicemia, Pneumonia & Renal Failure" caused by thermal burns with other significant conditions being fractures to the right femur, left tibia, right tibia and pelvis.

As of May 2023, Angela was living in the Indianapolis area and her husband was working for a company that restores vintage USAC, CART, and INDYCAR race cars.

== Complete USAC Championship Car results ==
Year	1	2	3	4	5	6	7	8	9	10	11	12	13	14	15	16	17	18	19	20	21	22	23	24	Pos	Points
1969	PHX	HAN	INDY	MIL	LAN	PIP	CDR	NAZ	TRE	IRP	IRP	MIL	SPR	DOV	DUQ	ISF	BRN; 5	BRN	TRE	SAC	KEN; 14	KEN; 7	PHX	RIV; 6	-	0
1970	PHX	SON	TRE	INDY	MIL	LAN	CDR; 2	MCH	IRP; 8	SPR	MIL	ONT; 27	DUQ	ISF	SED	TRE	SAC	PHX; 1							18th	615
1971	RAF; 4	RAF; 5	PHX; 3	TRE	INDY	MIL	POC	MCH	MIL	ONT; 12	TRE; 16	PHX; 23													18th	590
1972	PHX; 19	TRE; 16	INDY; 32	MIL; 6	MCH; 17	POC; 23	MIL; 9	ONT; 20	TRE; 19	PHX; 19															25th	200
1973	TWS; 13	TRE; 5	TRE; 4	INDY; 22	MIL	POC	MCH	MIL	ONT	ONT	ONT	MCH	MCH	TRE	TWS	PHX									24th	330

== Indy 500 results ==
Year	Car	Start	Qual	Rank	Finish	Laps	Led	Retired
1972	42	9	181.726	17	32	5	0	Rod
1973	40	4	196.582	4	22	57	12	Crash T4
Totals						62	12	

Starts	2
Poles	0
Front Row	0
Wins	0
Top 5	0
Top 10	0
Retired	2

== Complete Non-Championship Formula One results ==
(key)

Year	Entrant	Chassis	Engine	1	2	3	4	5	6	7	8
1971	Junor-Tarozzi Engineering	Eagle Mk 5	Plymouth V8	ARG	ROC	QUE; 28	SPR	INT	RIN	OUL	VIC

== See also ==
- List of fatalities at Indianapolis
