= IROC IX =

Motor car races held in 1985

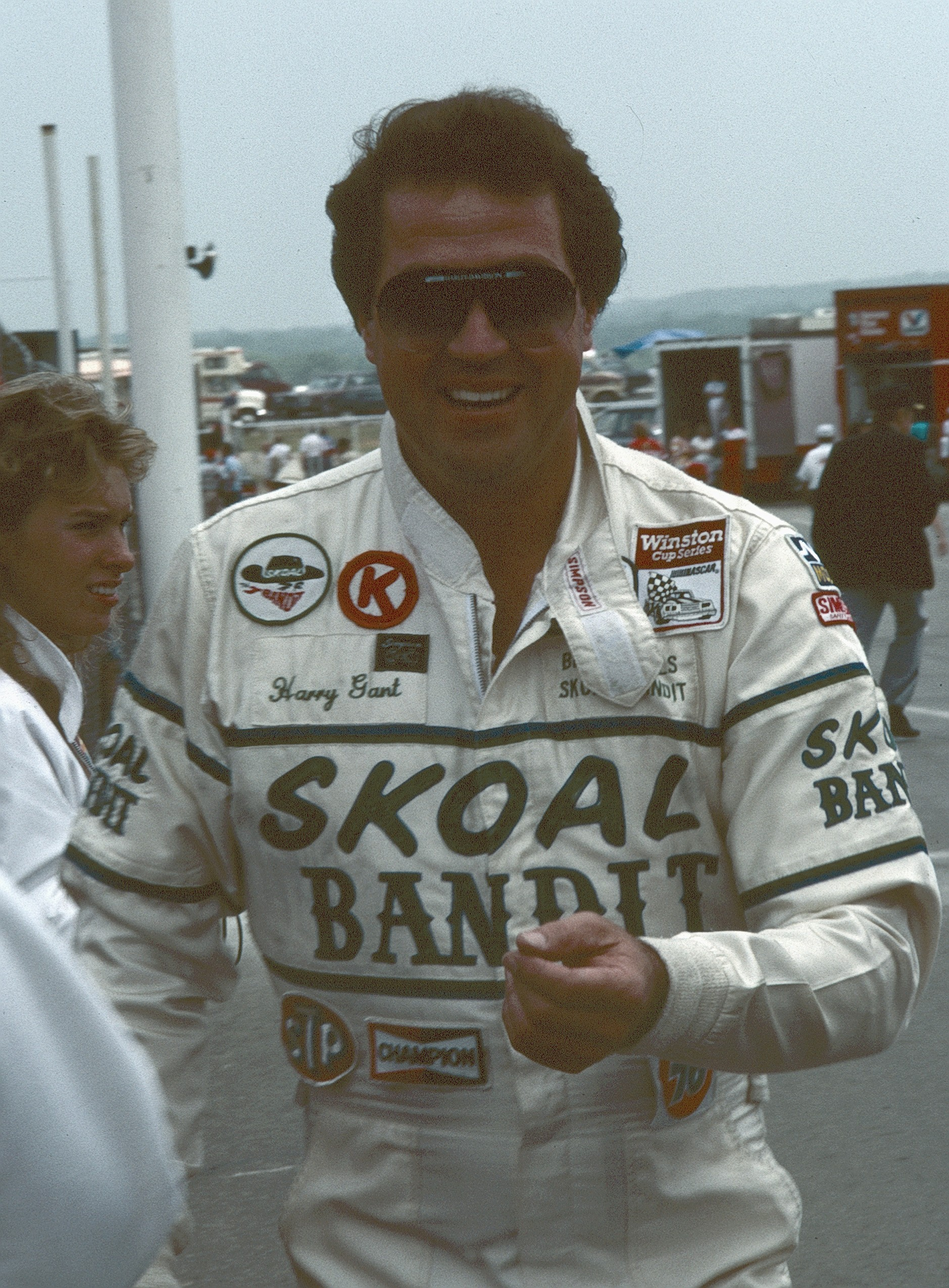
Harry Gant, the IROC IX champion

IROC IX was the ninth year of IROC competition, which took place in 1985. It saw the use of the Chevrolet Camaro in all races, was the second straight season that television coverage was on CBS, and continued the format introduced in IROC VIII. Race one took place on the Daytona International Speedway, race two took place at Mid-Ohio, race three was rained out at Talladega Superspeedway, and race four concluded the year at Michigan International Speedway. Harry Gant won the championship and $158,200 in a tie-breaker with Darrell Waltrip.

The roster of drivers and final points standings were as follows:

Rank	Driver	Points	Winnings	Series
1	(United States) Harry Gant ^{1}	45	$158,200	NASCAR Winston Cup Series; 2nd in 1984 Winston Cup points
2	(United States) Darrell Waltrip ^{1}	45	$80,400	NASCAR Winston Cup Series; 5th in 1984 Winston Cup points
3	(United States) Bobby Rahal	40	$55,100	CART PPG IndyCar World Series; 3rd in 1984 IndyCar points
4	(United States) Tom Sneva	32	$43,000	CART PPG IndyCar World Series; 2nd in 1984 IndyCar points
5	(United States) Terry Labonte ^{2}	31	$39,300	NASCAR Winston Cup Series; 1984 Winston Cup Champion
6	(United Kingdom) Derek Bell ^{2}	31	$30,000	World Endurance Championship; 4th in 1984 World Sportscar Championship
7	(United Kingdom) John Watson	30	$29,000	FIA Formula One World Championship; World Endurance Championship; Winner of the 1984 Fuji 1000KM
8	(United States) Cale Yarborough	29	$27,400	NASCAR Winston Cup Series; Defending IROC Champion; 1984 Daytona 500 winner
9	(United States) A. J. Foyt	28	$29,500	CART PPG IndyCar World Series; IROC III & IROC IV Champion
10	(West Germany) Jochen Mass	27	$23,000	World Endurance Championship; 2nd in 1984 World Sportscar Championship
11	(United States) Mario Andretti ^{3}	25	$26,700	CART PPG IndyCar World Series; 1984 IndyCar Champion; IROC VI champion
12	(United States) Tom Gloy	13	$20,000	SCCA Trans-Am Series; 1984 Trans-Am Champion

== Race results ==
=== Race One, Daytona International Speedway ===
Friday, February 15, 1985

Finish	Grid	Car no.	Driver	Car Make	Car Color	Laps	Status	Laps Led	Points
1	11	5	(United States) Darrell Waltrip	Chevrolet Camaro	Light Blue	40	0:32:55	1	23 (2)
2	6	1	(United States) Tom Sneva	Chevrolet Camaro	White	40	Flagged		17
3	9	4	(United States) A. J. Foyt	Chevrolet Camaro	Cream	40	Flagged	35	19 (5)
4	4	8	(United Kingdom) Derek Bell	Chevrolet Camaro	Orange	40	Flagged		12
5	12	7	(United States) Harry Gant	Chevrolet Camaro	Blue	40	Flagged		10
6	7	3	(United States) Cale Yarborough	Chevrolet Camaro	Pink	40	Flagged	4	12 (3)
7	8	17	(West Germany) Jochen Mass	Chevrolet Camaro	Silver	40	Flagged		8
8	1	2	(United Kingdom) John Watson	Chevrolet Camaro	Dark Blue	40	Flagged		7
9	3	12	(United States) Bobby Rahal	Chevrolet Camaro	Red	39	Crash		6
10	5	6	(United States) Terry Labonte	Chevrolet Camaro	Yellow	39	Flagged		5
11	10	11	(United States) Tom Gloy	Chevrolet Camaro	Black	15	Crash		4
12	2	9	(United States) Mario Andretti	Chevrolet Camaro	Orange Yellow	5	Mechanical		3

(5) Indicates 5 bonus points added to normal race points scored for leading the most laps.
(3) Indicates 3 bonus points added to normal race points scored for leading the 2nd most laps
(2) Indicates 2 bonus points added to normal race points scored for leading the 3rd most laps.

Average speed: 182.278 mph (293.348 km/h)
Cautions: 1 (Lap 15, Tom Gloy accident in the tri-oval.)
Margin of victory: 3 sec
Lead changes: 3

=== Race Two, Mid-Ohio Sports Car Course ===
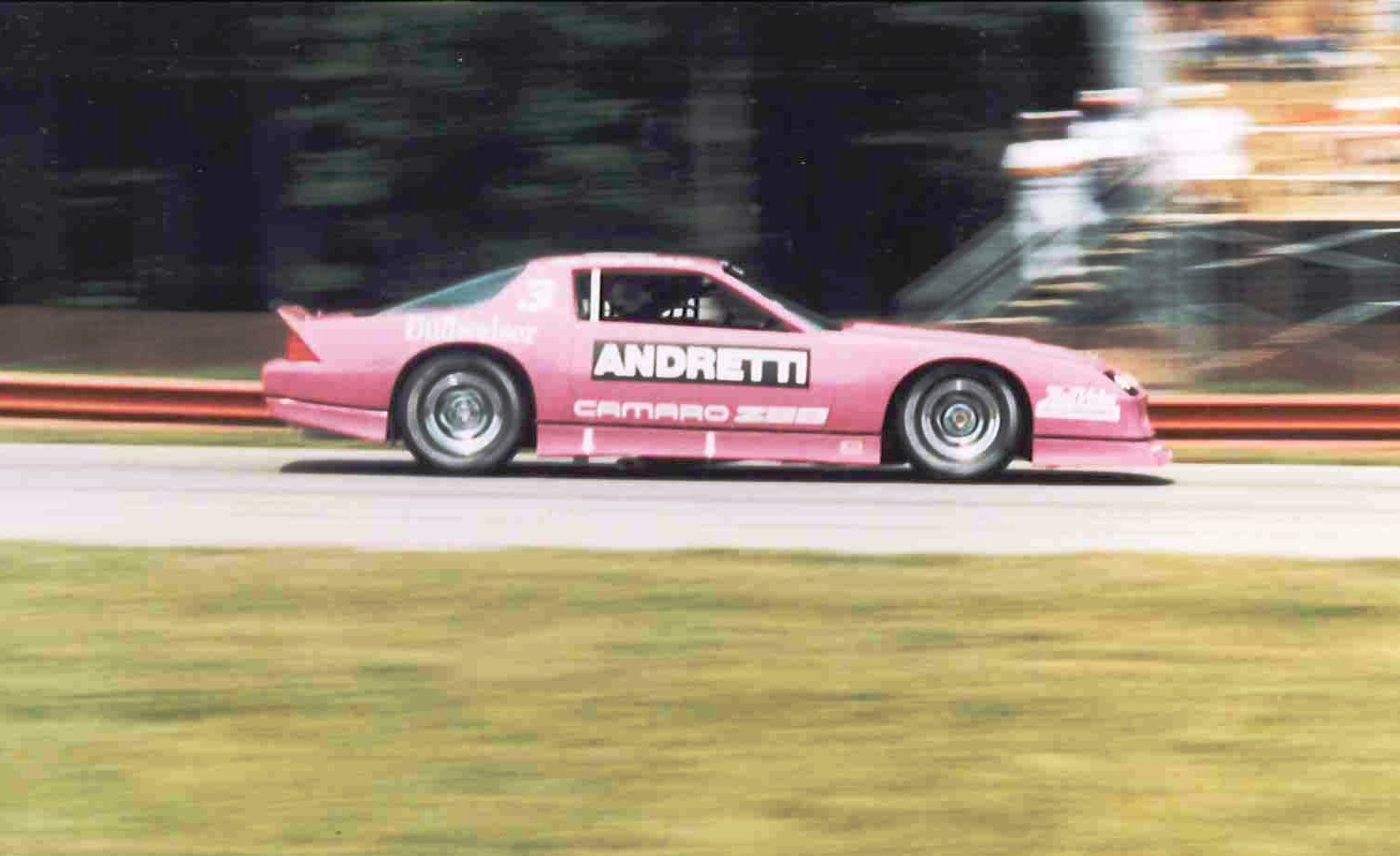
Mario Andretti in IROC race at Mid-Ohio (1985)

Friday, June 8, 1985

Finish	Grid	Car no.	Driver	Car Make	Car Color	Laps	Status	Laps Led	Points
1	4	17	(United States) Bobby Rahal	Chevrolet Camaro	Silver	29	0:49:30	2	24 (3)
2	5	7	(United Kingdom) John Watson	Chevrolet Camaro	Blue	29	Flagged		17
3	1	3	(United States) Mario Andretti	Chevrolet Camaro	Pink	29	Flagged	27	19 (5)
4	6	8	(West Germany) Jochen Mass	Chevrolet Camaro	Orange	29	Flagged		12
5	9	2	(United Kingdom) Derek Bell	Chevrolet Camaro	Dark Blue	29	Flagged		10
6	8	1	(United States) Harry Gant	Chevrolet Camaro	White	29	Flagged		9
7	12	6	(United States) Darrell Waltrip	Chevrolet Camaro	Yellow	29	Flagged		8
8	11	11	(United States) Tom Sneva	Chevrolet Camaro	Black	29	Flagged		7
9	3	5	(United States) Terry Labonte	Chevrolet Camaro	Powder Blue	29	Flagged		6
10	10	10	(United States) A. J. Foyt	Chevrolet Camaro	Red	29	Flagged		5
11	2	18	(United States) Tom Gloy	Chevrolet Camaro	Light Blue	29	Flagged		4
12	7	12	(United States) Cale Yarborough	Chevrolet Camaro	Dark Red	29	Flagged		3

(5) Indicates 5 bonus points added to normal race points scored for leading the most laps.
(3) Indicates 3 bonus points added to normal race points scored for leading the 2nd most laps
(2) Indicates 2 bonus points added to normal race points scored for leading the 3rd most laps (Did not occur in this race so not awarded).

Average speed: 84.363 mph (135.769 km/h)
Cautions: none
Margin of victory: 2.4 sec
Lead changes: 1

=== Race Three, Talladega Superspeedway ===
This race was scheduled for Saturday July 27th, 1985 but was canceled due to rain

=== Race Four, Michigan International Speedway ===
Saturday, August 10, 1985

Finish	Grid	Car no.	Driver	Car Make	Car Color	Laps	Status	Laps Led	Points
1	8	18	(United States) Harry Gant	Chevrolet Camaro	Light Blue	50	0:39:09	33	26 (5)
2	10	5	(United States) Terry Labonte	Chevrolet Camaro	Powder Blue	50	Flagged	13	20 (3)
3	9	12	(United States) Cale Yarborough	Chevrolet Camaro	Dark Red	50	Flagged		14
4	1	2	(United States) Darrell Waltrip	Chevrolet Camaro	Dark Blue	50	Flagged	4	14 (2)
5	2	1	(United States) Bobby Rahal	Chevrolet Camaro	White	50	Flagged		10
6	6	11	(United Kingdom) Derek Bell	Chevrolet Camaro	Black	50	Flagged		9
7	3	6	(United States) Tom Sneva	Chevrolet Camaro	Yellow	50	Flagged		8
8	7	17	(West Germany) Jochen Mass	Chevrolet Camaro	Silver	50	Flagged		7
9	4	8	(United Kingdom) John Watson	Chevrolet Camaro	Orange	50	Flagged		6
10	11	3	(United States) Tom Gloy	Chevrolet Camaro	Pink	49	Flagged		5
11	5	7	(United States) A. J. Foyt	Chevrolet Camaro	Blue	27	Mechanical		4
12	X	X	(United States) Mario Andretti ^{3}	Chevrolet Camaro	Not Assigned	0	Did Not Start, Injured		3

(5) Indicates 5 bonus points added to normal race points scored for leading the most laps.
(3) Indicates 3 bonus points added to normal race points scored for leading the 2nd most laps
(2) Indicates 2 bonus points added to normal race points scored for leading the 3rd most laps.

Average speed: 153.257 mph (246.643 km/h)
Cautions: none
Margin of victory: 4 feet
Lead changes: 8

== Notes ==
1. Harry Gant and Darrell Waltrip tied for the championship, but Gant was awarded the title due to a higher finishing position in the final race.
2. Terry Labonte and Derek Bell tied for fifth place, but Labonte was awarded the position due a higher finish in the final race.
3. Mario Andretti did not compete in the final race due to injury.
