= IROC XIII =

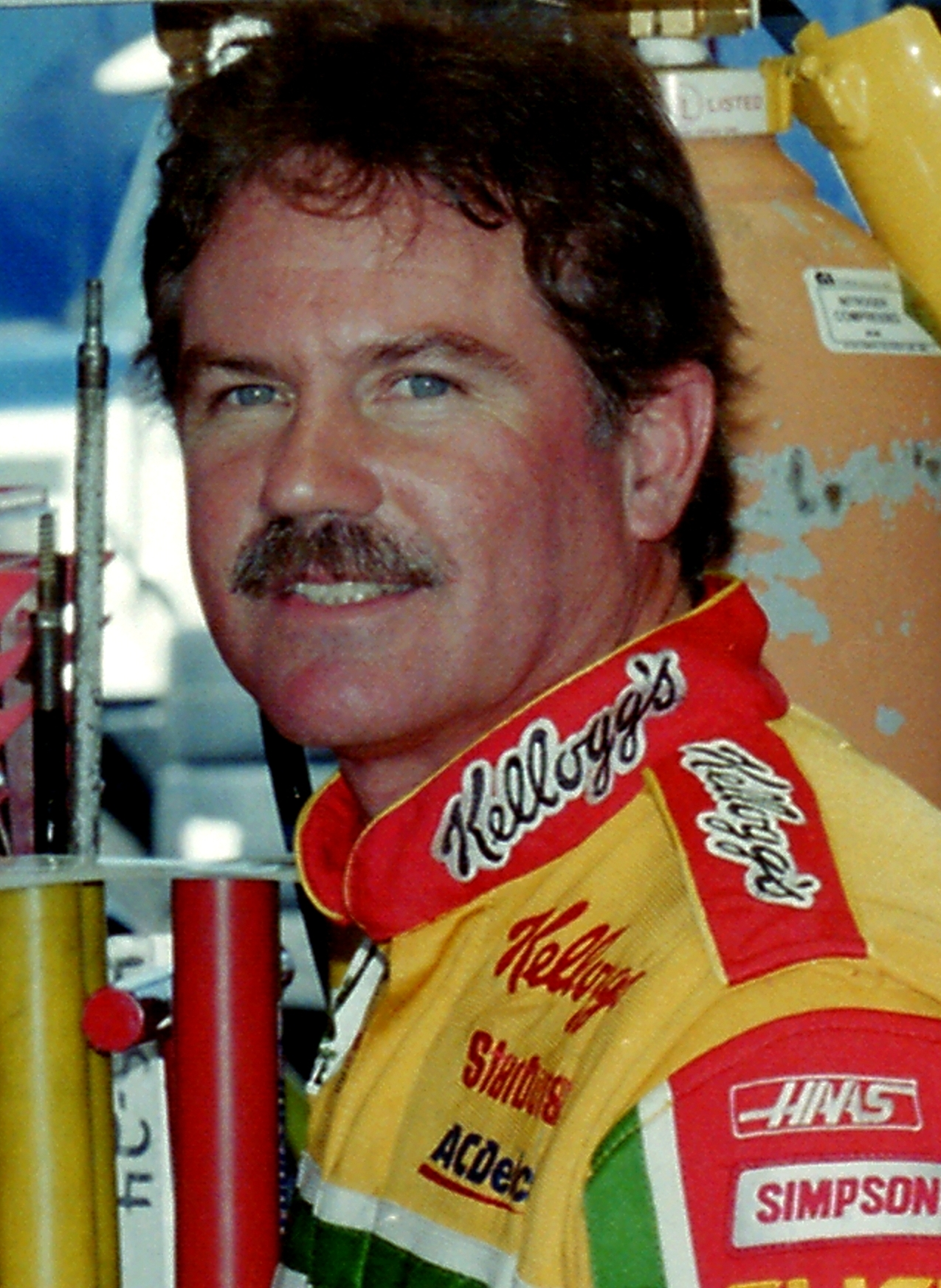
Terry Labonte (seen in 1997), the IROC XIII champion

IROC XIII was the thirteenth year of IROC competition, which took place in 1989. it saw the use of the Chevrolet Camaro in all races for the final year, and continued the format introduced in IROC VIII. Race one took place on the Daytona International Speedway, race two took place at Nazareth Speedway, race three ran at Michigan International Speedway, and race four concluded the year at Watkins Glen International. Terry Labonte won the series championship and $204,900.

The roster of drivers and final points standings were as follows:

Rank	Driver	Points	Winnings	Series
1	(United States) Terry Labonte	72	$204,900	NASCAR Winston Cup Series; 4th in 1988 Winston Cup points
2	(United States) Al Unser Jr.	60	$92,500	CART PPG IndyCar World Series; 2nd in 1988 IndyCar points 2 time and defending IROC Champion
3	(United States) Rusty Wallace	58	$66,200	NASCAR Winston Cup Series; 2nd in 1988 Winston Cup points
4	(United States) Dale Earnhardt	57	$58,900	NASCAR Winston Cup Series; 3rd in 1988 Winston Cup points 3 time Winston Cup champion
5	(United States) Scott Pruett	51	$55,700	IMSA Camel GTO; 1988 GTO Champion; 1988 24 Hours of Daytona GTO winner
6	(United States) Bill Elliott	38	$52,000	NASCAR Winston Cup Series; 1988 Winston Cup champion 2 time Daytona 500 winner
7	(United States) A. J. Foyt	36	$54,000	CART PPG IndyCar World Series; 4 time Indianapolis 500 winner 7 time IndyCar Champion; IROC III & IROC IV champion
8	(United States) Danny Sullivan	35	$49,400	CART PPG IndyCar World Series; 1988 IndyCar champion 1985 Indianapolis 500 winner
9	(United States) Hurley Haywood	31	$46,000	SCCA Trans-Am Series; 1988 Trans-Am Champion
10	(Australia) Geoff Brabham ^{1}	24	$44,400	IMSA Camel GTP; 1988 GTP Champion; 2 time 24 Hours of Le Mans winner
11	(United States) Rick Mears ^{1}	24	$42,100	CART PPG IndyCar World Series; 3 time Indianapolis 500 winner 3 time IndyCar Champion; 4th in 1988 IndyCar points
12	(United States) Richard Petty	16	$40,400	NASCAR Winston Cup Series; 7 time Winston Cup Champion; 7 time Daytona 500 winner Most ever NASCAR Cup race victories (200)

== Race results ==
=== Race One, Daytona International Speedway ===
Friday, February 17, 1989

Finish	Grid	Car no.	Driver	Car Make	Car Color	Laps	Status	Laps Led	Points
1	12	12	(United States) Rusty Wallace	Chevrolet Camaro	Dark Blue	40	0:32:37	5	23 (2)
2	5	5	(United States) Terry Labonte	Chevrolet Camaro	Aqua	40	Flagged	6	20 (3)
3	7	7	(United States) Dale Earnhardt	Chevrolet Camaro	White	40	Flagged	20	19 (5)
4	10	10	(United States) Al Unser Jr.	Chevrolet Camaro	Lime	40	Flagged	5	14 (2)
5	3	3	(United States) Bill Elliott	Chevrolet Camaro	Powder Blue	40	Flagged		10
6	9	9	(United States) Hurley Haywood	Chevrolet Camaro	Yellow	40	Flagged		9
7	2	2	(United States) A. J. Foyt	Chevrolet Camaro	Pink	40	Flagged		8
8	1	1	(United States) Rick Mears	Chevrolet Camaro	Rose	40	Flagged	1	7
9	6	6	(United States) Richard Petty	Chevrolet Camaro	Orange	40	Flagged	3	6
10	8	8	(United States) Scott Pruett	Chevrolet Camaro	Red	40	Flagged		5
11	11	11	(Australia) Geoff Brabham	Chevrolet Camaro	Silver	40	Flagged		4
12	4	4	(United States) Danny Sullivan	Chevrolet Camaro	Blue	39	Flagged		3

(5) Indicates 5 bonus points added to normal race points scored for leading the most laps.
(3) Indicates 3 bonus points added to normal race points scored for leading the 2nd most laps
(2) Indicates 2 bonus points added to normal race points scored for leading the 3rd most laps.

Average speed: 183.955 mph (296.047 km/h)
Cautions: none
Margin of victory: 1 cl
Lead changes: 9

=== Race Two, Nazareth Speedway ===
Saturday, April 29, 1989

Finish	Grid	Car no.	Driver	Car Make	Car Color	Laps	Status	Laps Led	Points
1	1	12	(United States) Danny Sullivan	Chevrolet Camaro	Red	75	0:45:40	14	23 (2)
2	3	10	(United States) Scott Pruett	Chevrolet Camaro	Pink	75	Flagged	17	20 (3)
3	11	1	(United States) Rusty Wallace	Chevrolet Camaro	White	75	Flagged	4	14
4	9	4	(United States) Al Unser Jr.	Chevrolet Camaro	Light Blue	75	Flagged		12
5	4	7	(United States) A. J. Foyt	Chevrolet Camaro	Rose	75	Flagged	40	15 (5)
6	10	2	(United States) Terry Labonte	Chevrolet Camaro	Dark Blue	74	Flagged		9
7	8	3	(United States) Dale Earnhardt	Chevrolet Camaro	Dark Orange	74	Flagged		8
8	12	11	(Australia) Geoff Brabham ^{2}	Chevrolet Camaro	Yellow	74	Flagged		7
9	7	6	(United States) Hurley Haywood	Chevrolet Camaro	Light Orange	74	Flagged		6
10	5	8	(United States) Rick Mears	Chevrolet Camaro	Cream	74	Flagged		5
11	6	5	(United States) Bill Elliott	Chevrolet Camaro	Silver	73	Flagged		4
12	2	9	(United States) Richard Petty	Chevrolet Camaro	Blue	73	Flagged		3

(5) Indicates 5 bonus points added to normal race points scored for leading the most laps.
(3) Indicates 3 bonus points added to normal race points scored for leading the 2nd most laps
(2) Indicates 2 bonus points added to normal race points scored for leading the 3rd most laps. Average speed: 98.54 mph (158.58 km/h)
Cautions: 3
Margin of victory: 13.45 sec
Lead changes: 6

Lap Leader Breakdown

Driver	From Lap	To Lap	Number of Laps
Danny Sullivan	1	1	1
Scott Pruett	2	15	14
A. J. Foyt	18	36	19
Rusty Wallace	37	40	4
A. J. Foyt	41	59	19
Scott Pruett	60	62	3
Danny Sullivan	63	75	13

=== Race Three, Michigan International Speedway ===
Saturday, August 5, 1989

Finish	Grid	Car no.	Driver	Car Make	Car Color	Laps	Status	Laps Led	Points
1	11	2	(United States) Terry Labonte	Chevrolet Camaro	Light Blue	50	0:37:54	33	26 (5)
2	10	3	(United States) Dale Earnhardt	Chevrolet Camaro	Pink	50	Flagged	9	20 (3)
3	12	1	(United States) Rusty Wallace	Chevrolet Camaro	Dark Blue	50	Flagged	3	14
4	4	9	(United States) Bill Elliott	Chevrolet Camaro	Aqua	50	Flagged		12
5	7	6	(United States) Al Unser Jr.	Chevrolet Camaro	Red	50	Flagged		10
6	8	5	(United States) Scott Pruett	Chevrolet Camaro	Tan	50	Flagged		9
7	6	7	(United States) A. J. Foyt	Chevrolet Camaro	Orange	50	Flagged		8
8	5	8	(United States) Hurley Haywood	Chevrolet Camaro	Lime	50	Flagged		7
9	3	10	(United States) Rick Mears	Chevrolet Camaro	Powder Blue	50	Flagged		6
10	9	4	(United States) Danny Sullivan	Chevrolet Camaro	Yellow	50	Flagged		5
11	1	12	(United States) Richard Petty	Chevrolet Camaro	Silver	50	Flagged	1	4
12	2	11	(Australia) Geoff Brabham	Chevrolet Camaro	White	50	Flagged	4	5 (2)

(5) Indicates 5 bonus points added to normal race points scored for leading the most laps.
(3) Indicates 3 bonus points added to normal race points scored for leading the 2nd most laps
(2) Indicates 2 bonus points added to normal race points scored for leading the 3rd most laps.

Average speed: 158.343 mph
Cautions: none
Margin of victory: .47 sec
Lead changes: 8

=== Race Four, Watkins Glen International ===
Saturday, August 12, 1989

Finish	Grid	Car no.	Driver	Car Make	Car Color	Laps	Status	Laps Led	Points
1	4	4	(United States) Al Unser Jr.	Chevrolet Camaro	Dark Blue	30	0:39:08	20	26 (5)
2	5	5	(United States) Scott Pruett	Chevrolet Camaro	Black	30	Flagged		17
3	1	1	(United States) Terry Labonte	Chevrolet Camaro	Cream	30	Flagged	10	17 (3)
4	8	8	(United States) Bill Elliott	Chevrolet Camaro	Rose	30	Flagged		12
5	3	3	(United States) Dale Earnhardt	Chevrolet Camaro	Purple	30	Flagged		10
6	9	9	(United States) Hurley Haywood	Chevrolet Camaro	Yellow	30	Flagged		9
7	12	11	(Australia) Geoff Brabham	Chevrolet Camaro	Red	30	Flagged		8
8	2	2	(United States) Rusty Wallace	Chevrolet Camaro	Powder Blue	30	Flagged		7
9	10	10	(United States) Rick Mears	Chevrolet Camaro	White	29	Flagged		6
10	6	6	(United States) A. J. Foyt	Chevrolet Camaro	Light Blue	28	Flagged		5
11	7	7	(United States) Danny Sullivan	Chevrolet Camaro	Blue	27	Flagged		4
12	11	12	(United States) Richard Petty	Chevrolet Camaro	Orange	17	Crash		3

(5) Indicates 5 bonus points added to normal race points scored for leading the most laps.
(3) Indicates 3 bonus points added to normal race points scored for leading the 2nd most laps
(2) Indicates 2 bonus points added to normal race points scored for leading the 3rd most laps (did not occur in this race so not awarded).

Average speed: 111.68 mph (179.73 km/h)
Cautions: none
Margin of victory: 1.3 sec
Lead changes: 1

Lap Leader Breakdown

Driver	From Lap	To Lap	Number of Laps
Terry Labonte	1	10	10
Al Unser Jr.	11	30	20

== Notes ==
1. Geoff Brabham and Rick Mears tied for tenth place in the championship standings, but Brabham was awarded the position due to a higher finishing position in the final race.
2. Geoff Brabham started from the back of the field in a back up car after an accident on the first lap.
