= A. J. Foyt =

American racing driver (born 1935)

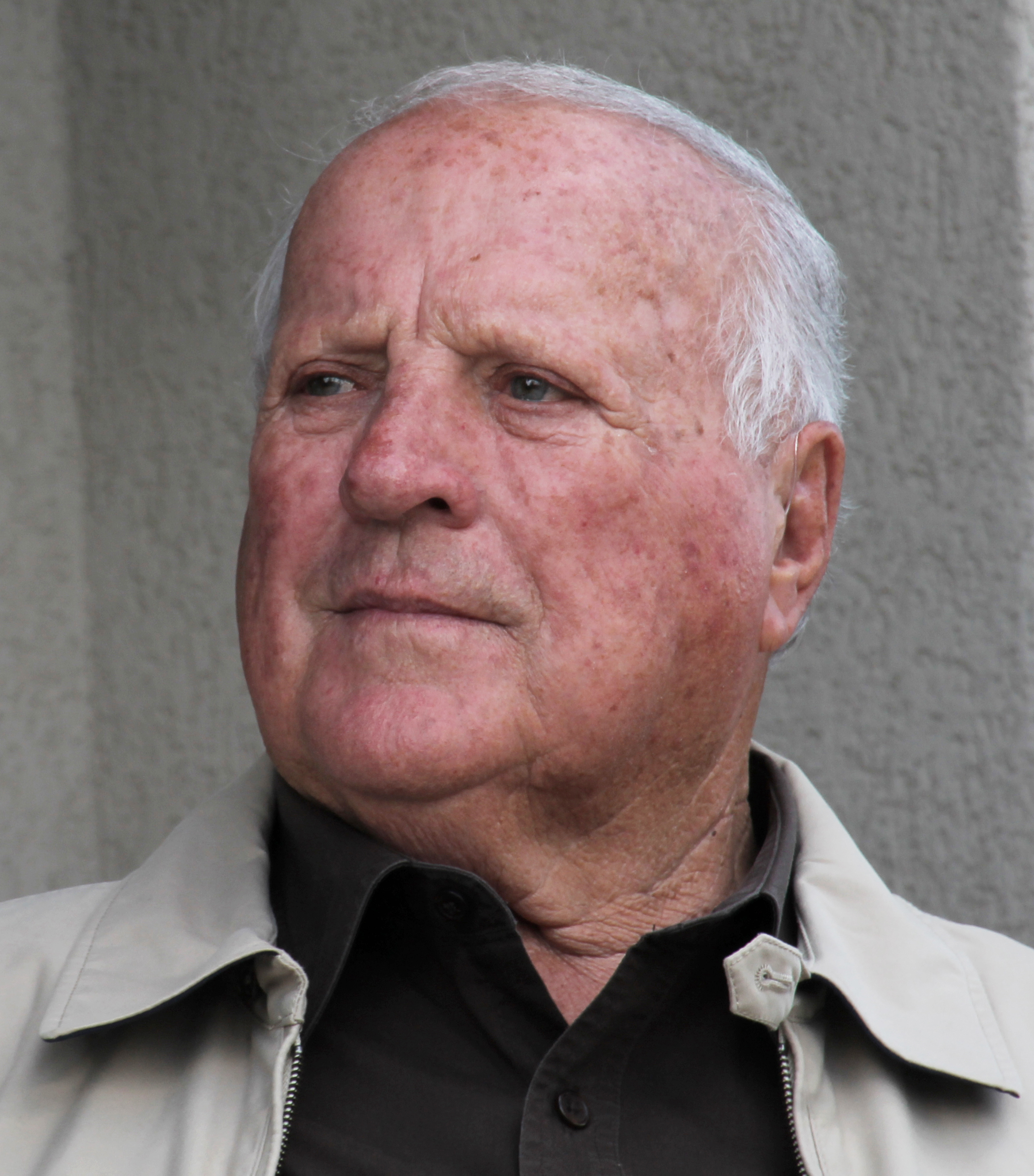
- Foyt in 2015
- Born: Anthony Joseph Foyt Jr. January 16, 1935 (age 91) Houston, Texas, U.S.

Championship titles
- USAC Eastern Sprint Car (1960); USAC Championship Car (1960, 1961, 1963, 1964, 1967, 1975, 1979); USAC Stock Car (1968, 1978, 1979); USAC Silver Crown (1972); Major victories Indianapolis 500 (1961, 1964, 1967, 1977); 24 Hours of Le Mans (1967); Daytona 500 (1972); Pocono 500 (1973, 1975, 1979, 1981); California 500 (1975); 24 Hours of Daytona (1983, 1985); 12 Hours of Sebring (1985)

Champ Car career
- 369 races run over 36 years
- Best finish: 1st (1960, 1961, 1963, 1964, 1967, 1975, 1979 (USAC))
- First race: 1957 Springfield 100 (Springfield)
- Last race: 1992 Indianapolis 500 (Indianapolis)
- First win: 1960 Ted Horn Memorial (DuQuoin)
- Last win: 1981 Pocono 500 (Pocono)
Wins	Podiums	Poles
67	120	53

NASCAR Cup Series career
- 128 races run over 33 years
- Best finish: 40th (1989)
- First race: 1963 Riverside 500 (Riverside)
- Last race: 1994 Brickyard 400 (Indianapolis)
- First win: 1964 Firecracker 400 (Daytona)
- Last win: 1972 Miller High Life 500 (Ontario)
Wins	Top tens	Poles
7	36	9

Formula One World Championship career
- Nationality: (United States) American
- Active years: 1958 – 1960
- Team(s): Kuzma, Kurtis Kraft
- Entries: 3
- Championships: 0
- Wins: 0
- Podiums: 0
- Career points: 0
- Pole positions: 0
- Fastest laps: 0
- First entry: 1958 Indianapolis 500
- Last entry: 1960 Indianapolis 500

24 Hours of Le Mans career
- Years: 1967
- Teams: Shelby-Ford
- Best finish: 1st (1967)
- Class wins: 1 (1967)

Anthony Joseph Foyt Jr. (born January 16, 1935) is an American retired racing driver who competed in numerous disciplines of motorsport, best known for his open wheel racing career, and as the first four-time winner of the Indianapolis 500. He holds the most American National Championship titles in history with seven.

Foyt competed in United States Automobile Club (USAC) Championship cars, sprint cars and midget cars. He raced stock cars in NASCAR and USAC. He holds the USAC career wins record with 159 victories, and the Indy car racing career wins record with 67.

Foyt is the only driver to have won the Indianapolis 500, the 24 Hours of Le Mans, the Daytona 500, and the 24 Hours of Daytona. He is a member of numerous motorsports halls of fame.

In the mid-1960s, Foyt became a team owner, fielding cars for himself and other drivers. After retiring from race driving, he has owned A. J. Foyt Enterprises, which has fielded teams in CART, the IndyCar Series, and NASCAR.

== Early life ==
Foyt was born in Houston, Texas, to Anthony Joseph "Tony" Foyt and Emma Evelyn (née Monk). His father was a mechanic who owned and raced midget race cars as a hobby. Foyt's father gave A.J. a toy racer with a lawnmower engine when he was three years old. His first victory took place at age five after he challenged local midget champion Doc Cossey to a match race at Buffalo Stadium. Foyt won, and later recalled: "...if ever a kid knew that he had chosen the right profession for himself, I knew it at that moment." Tony recalled leaving eleven-year-old A.J. home to attend a race and returning to find the boy had done considerable damage to the home driving the family's other race car in the yard, including causing the car's engine to catch on fire. Though angry, the older Foyt did accept the likelihood of his son having a future as a driver.

Frequently in fights, he often ran home from school shortly after being dropped off in the morning. On one occasion a teacher called his mother to complain that his homework was covered with racing cars. After obtaining a driver's license, he purchased a used Ford and practiced mechanical skills he had learned working on his father's cars. He participated in street races until police turned him in to his parents. Foyt eventually dropped out of high school to work as a mechanic and to concentrate on racing.

== Driving career ==
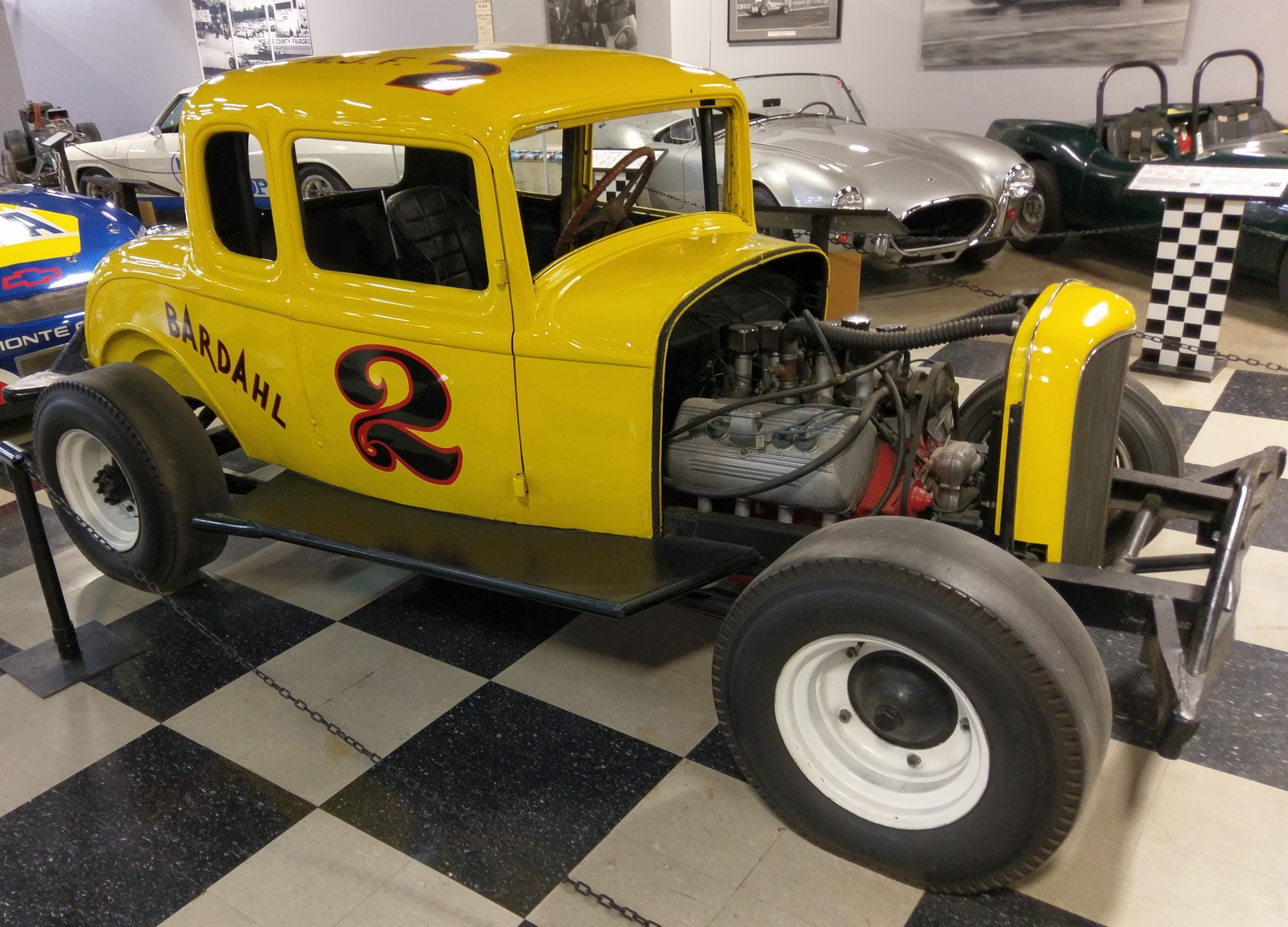
1932 Ford Hardtop raced by A.J Foyt in 1955, California Automobile Museum

=== Midget car career ===
Foyt raced midget cars from the age of seventeen, driving for a low-budget owner after his father refused to let A.J. use his car. He took part in the 1956 Night Before the 500 at West 16th Street Speedway, located across the street from the Indianapolis Motor Speedway. His first midget car win was at Kansas City in 1957, and he finished seventh for the season. He no longer raced midget cars full-time after 1957 but participated as his schedule allowed. He won the 1960 and 1961 Turkey Night Grand Prix - the first two years that event shifted to Ascot Park in Gardena, California. He won the 1961 Hut Hundred after starting last, and finished seventh in National Midget point standings that year. He won the Astro Grand Prix in 1970, held inside the Houston Astrodome.

In 1975 and 1976, Foyt won the Australian Speedcar Grand Prix, a midget race held at the Liverpool International Speedway in Sydney, Australia. He ended his career with twenty midget car feature wins. At the height of his success, Foyt made occasional appearances in small, local events to support promoters who assisted him in his early career.

=== Sprint car career ===
Foyt began his sprint car career in 1956, at the age of 21, driving the Les Vaughn Offy with the International Motor Contest Association. On August 24, 1956, Foyt outqualified a field of 42 drivers at the Minnesota State Fair and, the following day, he won his first sprint car race, running away with the IMCA feature at the Red River Fair in Fargo, North Dakota. On June 16, 1957, on the high banked asphalt track at Salem, Indiana, Foyt came out on top in a race-long battle with Bob Cleberg. That victory put Foyt on the radar for USAC car owners and he switched from the IMCA to USAC later that season. Foyt eventually won 28 USAC National sprint car feature races and the USAC Eastern Championship in 1960. Foyt continued to race sprint cars long after he was firmly established as one of the top drivers at the Indy 500.

=== Championship car career ===
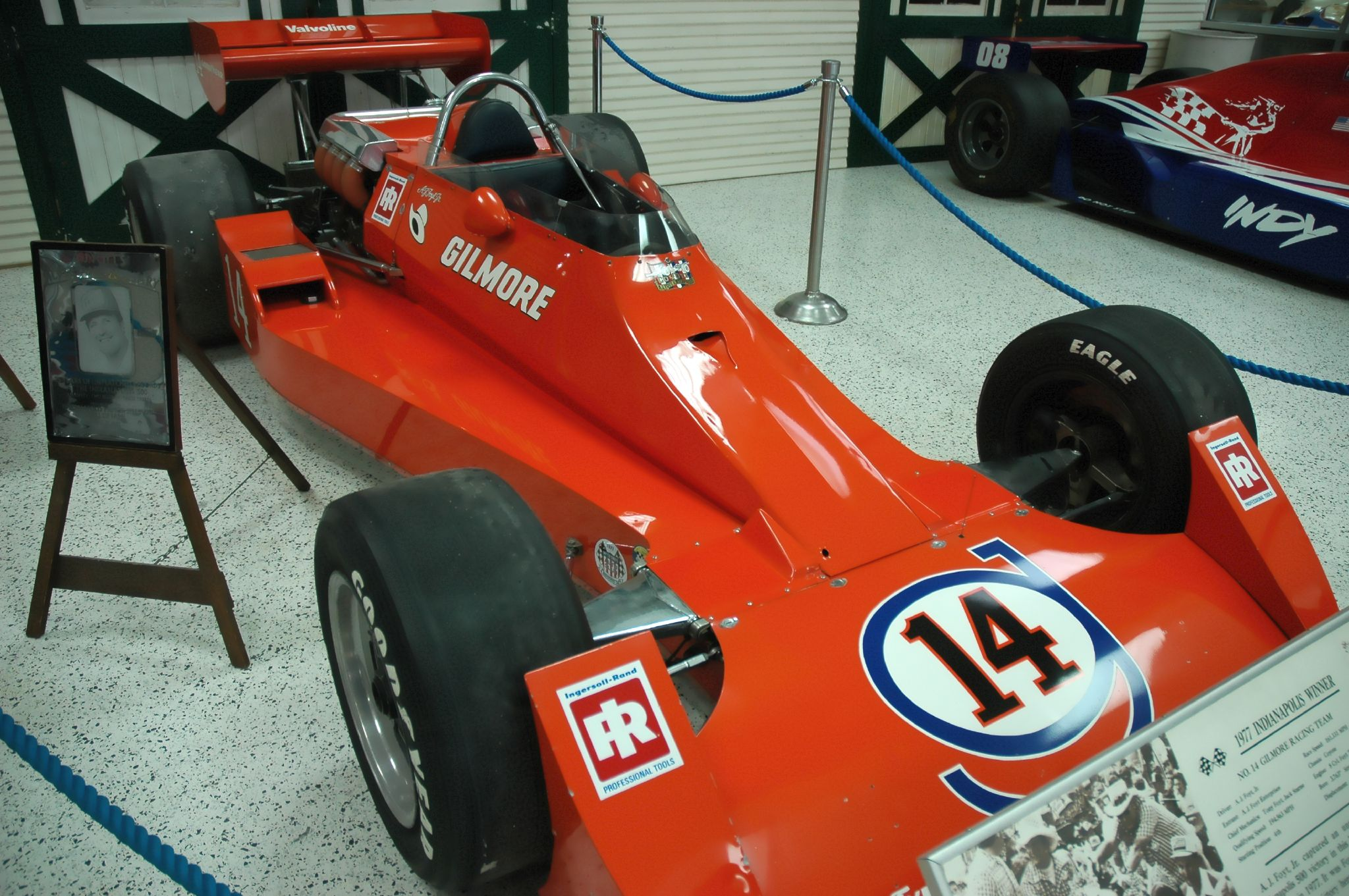
The car Foyt drove to Indy victory in 1977

In 1958, Foyt debuted at Indy, but spun out on lap 148. In 1961, he became the first driver to successfully defend his points championship and win the Indy 500. Foyt made a late pit stop, but a refueling malfunction meant he returned to the race without enough fuel to finish. Eddie Sachs, unaware that Foyt's now-quicker car was light on fuel, pushed hard to keep up, and had to pit from the lead with just three laps remaining to replace a tire. Foyt also pitted again for fuel, but resumed the lead and beat Sachs by 8.28 seconds, the second-closest finish to that time. He raced in each season from 1957 to 1992, starting in 374 races and finishing in the top ten 201 times, with 67 victories. In 1958, Foyt raced in Italy in the Trophy of the Two Worlds at Monza.

Ford-powered entries were widely expected to dominate the 1964 Indianapolis 500. Discussions between Ford officials and Foyt (who had a stock car contract with Ford at the time) took place regarding the possibility of Foyt taking over the third Team Lotus-Ford. Foyt wanted the use of the car for the entire month, but Lotus team owner Colin Chapman refused to promise him the reserve car, in case something happened to cars driven by team drivers Jim Clark and Dan Gurney. So Foyt stayed with his reliable Offenhauser-engined roadster, winning a record ten of fourteen races en route to the 1964 championship, including winning his second Indianapolis 500. The race is remembered for the fiery second-lap crash that claimed the lives of Dave MacDonald and Eddie Sachs.

In the 1967 Indianapolis 500, Parnelli Jones' STP-Paxton Turbocar was expected to easily defeat the field. Jones lapped the field, but his car expired with three laps remaining, and Foyt inherited the lead. As Foyt moved through turn four on the 200th lap, he had a premonition of trouble and slowed down. A few hundred yards ahead, Carl Williams spun out, triggering a five-car front-stretch accident. Foyt threaded his way through the wreckage and took the checkered flag.

In the 1977 Indianapolis 500, Foyt ran out of fuel, and had to make a pit stop. He had to make up around 32 seconds on Gordon Johncock. Foyt made up 1.5 to 2 seconds per lap by turning up his turbo boost, which risked destroying the engine. Johncock's engine expired after Foyt closed to within eight seconds, and Foyt passed for the win.

Foyt won the Indianapolis 500 four times, in 1961, 1964, 1967, and 1977, the first driver to have done so. Of his 67 career Championship Car race victories, twelve were won at Trenton. Foyt also won the Indycar Series seven times and qualified for the Indianapolis 500 race 35 times. Foyt recorded a top ten finish at Indianapolis in five consecutive decades (1950s-1990s).

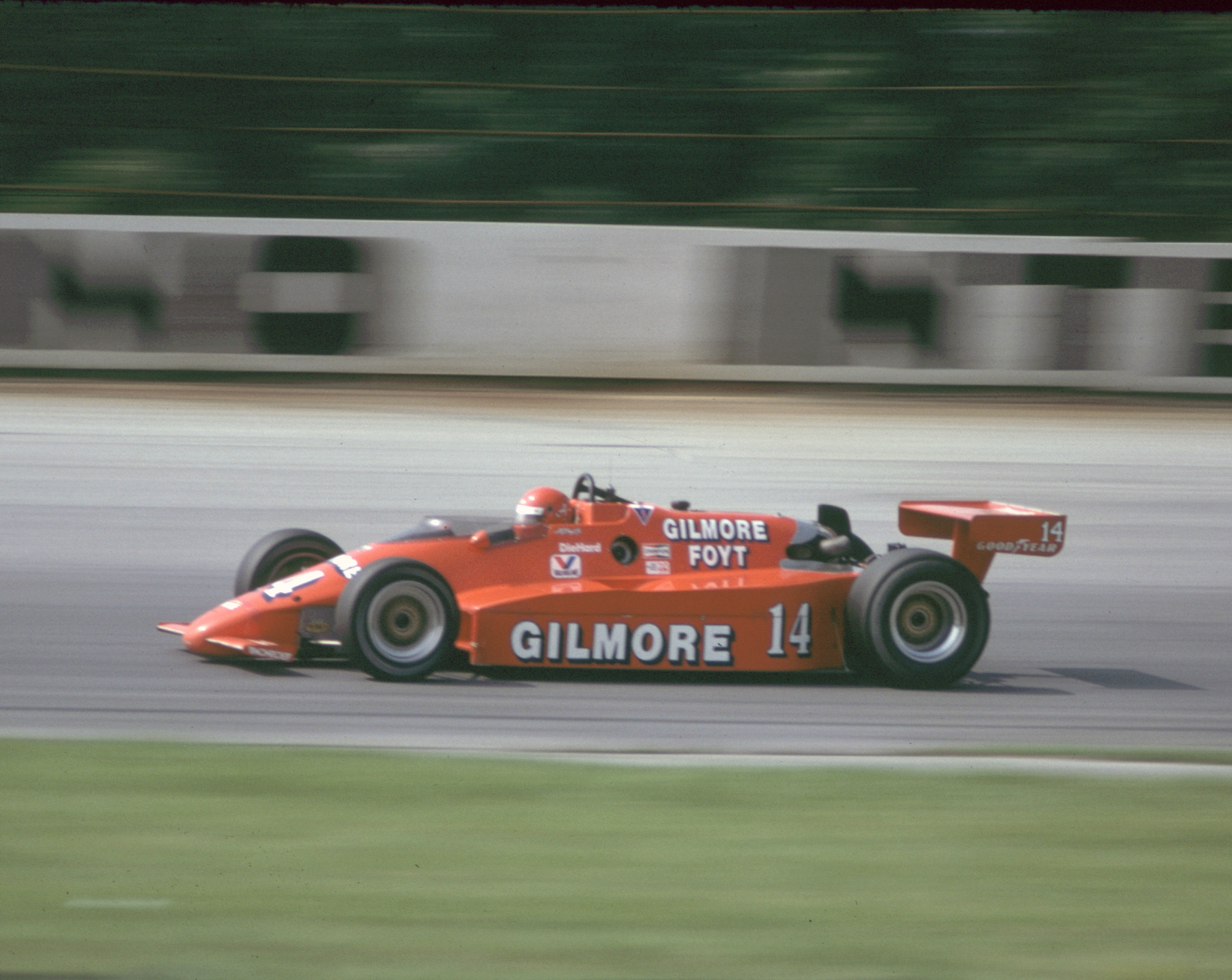
Foyt racing at Pocono Raceway in 1984

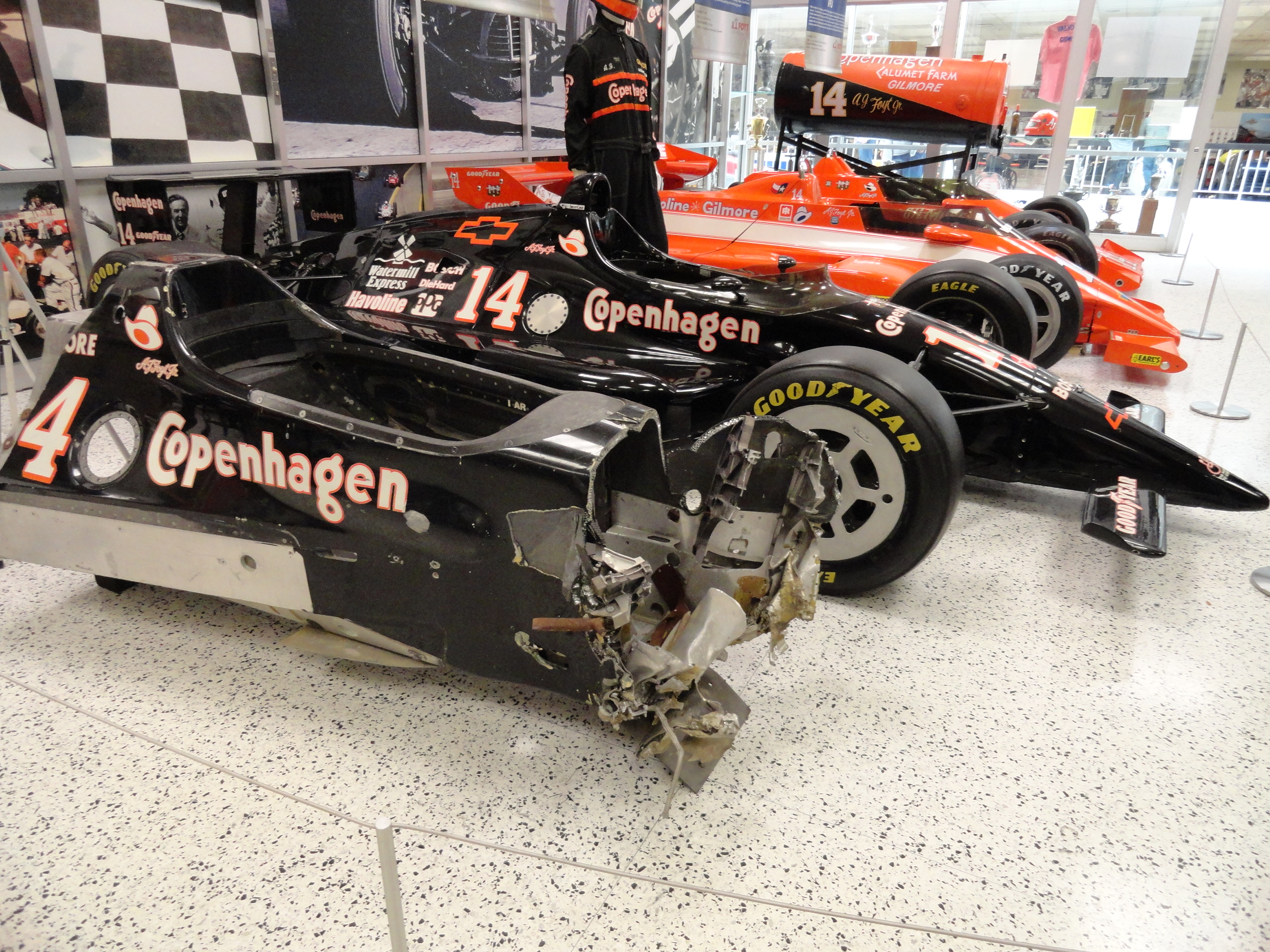
The Lola-Chevrolet that Foyt crashed in 1990

In the 1982 Indianapolis 500, Foyt started on the front row but was involved in a controversial wreck when Kevin Cogan spun out. Foyt was livid and said "That damn 'Coogin'" on live radio, and when asked on TV by Chris Economaki what had happened, Foyt shouted, "I don't know, he just ran right square into my goddamn left front!" Economaki asked who he referred to, and Foyt replied, "Cogan!" After repairs during the red flag, Foyt led early but retired the car due to lingering damage from the crash.

In a 1990 CART race at Road America in Elkhart Lake, Wisconsin, Foyt's car left the track and plowed through a dirt embankment, severely injuring his legs and feet. After multiple surgeries and months of physiotherapy he returned for the 1991 Indianapolis 500 and qualified second. He announced his retirement before the race but changed his mind after being caught up in an early incident. He returned for a 35th consecutive start in 1992 and finished 9th.

=== Sports car racing ===
Foyt won the 24 Hours of Le Mans in his only attempt, in 1967, in a Ford GT40 Mk IV, partnered with Dan Gurney and entered by Carroll Shelby. Prior to the race, Foyt angered the fans and the local press by describing the notoriously fast and dangerous tree-lined course as "nothin' but a little old country road." Foyt reportedly got only ten laps of practice, but when Gurney overslept and missed a driver change in the middle of the night, Foyt was forced to double-stint and wound up driving nearly 18 hours of the 24. Foyt won the 12 Hours of Sebring and 24 Hours of Daytona in 1985 in a Porsche.

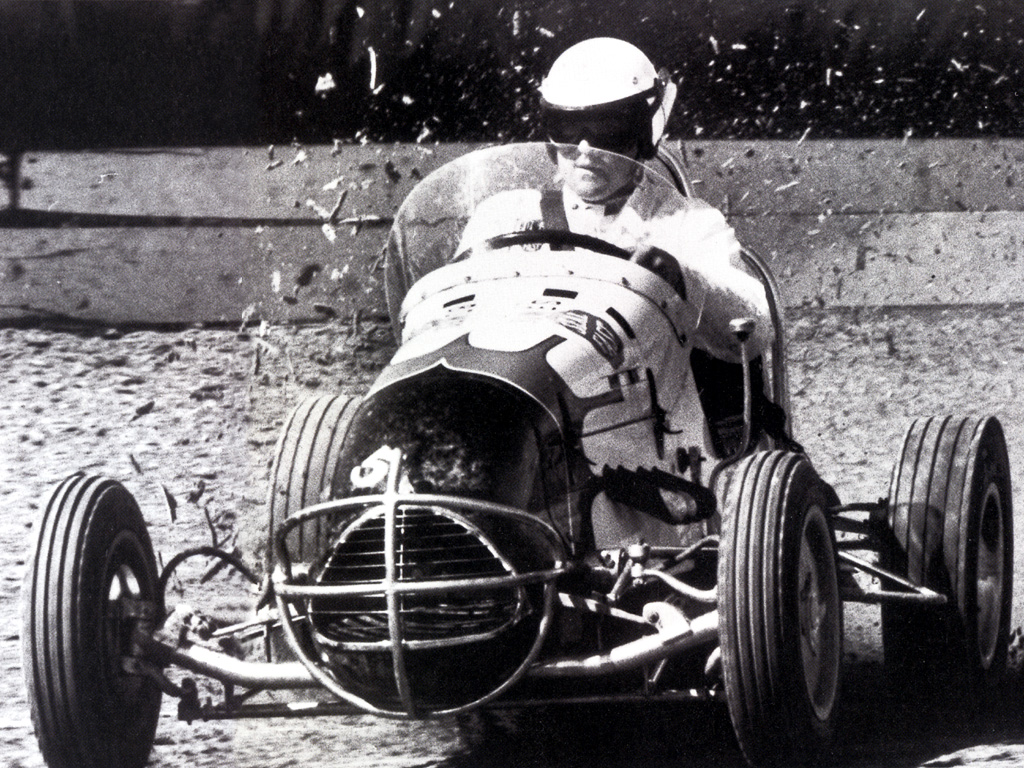
Foyt in a midget car in 1961

=== Stock car career ===
==== USAC Stock Car ====
Foyt was the champion in USAC's stock car in 1968, 1978, and 1979. He finished second in 1963 and 1969, and third in 1970.

==== NASCAR ====
Foyt, a veteran who had been racing professionally for eight seasons before trying his hand at NASCAR, only needed ten races to get his first victory. Richard Petty dominated the 1964 Firecracker 400 until dropping out with engine problems. Foyt swapped the lead with Bobby Isaac for the final fifty laps of the summer event at the Daytona International Speedway. Foyt passed Isaac on the final lap to win the race.

In January 1965, Foyt qualified and ran in the front of the pack most of the day with Dan Gurney and Parnelli Jones in the Motor Trend 500 at Riverside International Raceway. Jones retired with mechanical issues, leaving Gurney and Foyt contesting the lead until Foyt spun late in the race. After running hard to catch up with Gurney, Foyt's brakes failed at the end of Riverside's mile-long, downhill back straight. Foyt went into the infield at speed, launched off an embankment, dropped into a lower area, and slammed into a second embankment, tumbling end-over-end several times. The track doctor pronounced Foyt dead at the scene, but Jones revived him. Foyt suffered severe chest injuries, a broken back, and a fractured ankle. Footage of this is featured in the final scene of Red Line 7000.

Foyt ran out of gas near the end of the 1971 Daytona 500, and Petty passed him for the win. Foyt won the 1972 Daytona 500, and in 1979, Foyt finished third.

Foyt won the 1971 and 1972 races at the Ontario Motor Speedway for Wood Brothers Racing. His final win in NASCAR was in the first of Daytona's 125-mile qualifying heats in 1978, driving a self-fielded superspeedway Buick.

In 1988, Foyt was banned from NASCAR for six months and fined $5000 following a series of incidents during the Winston 500 at Talladega Superspeedway. Later, the suspension was lifted, though the fine increased to $7500.

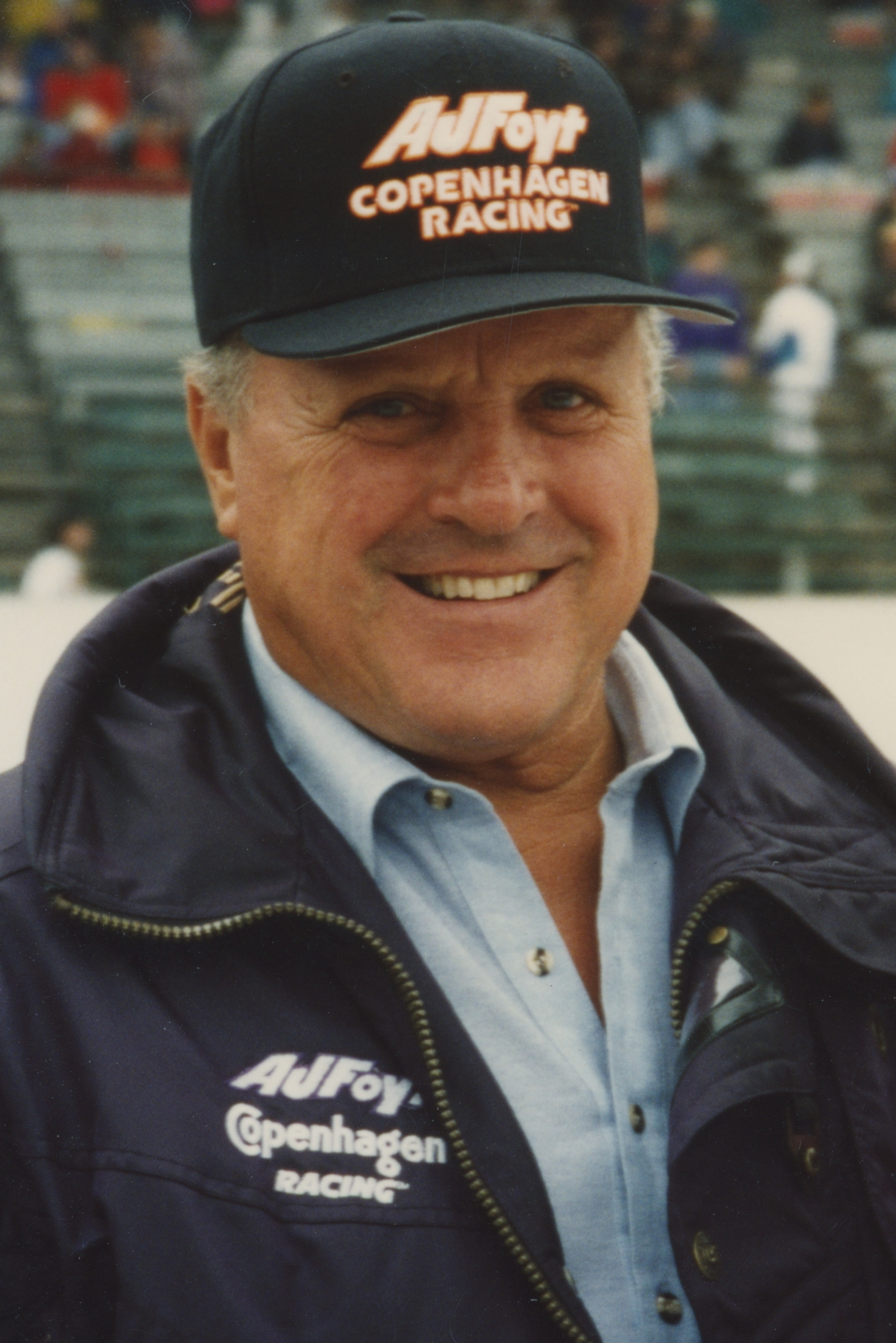
Foyt at the 1996 Indianapolis 500

Foyt's final NASCAR Winston Cup Series race was the 1994 Brickyard 400. Foyt finished 30th. Foyt failed to qualify in 1995 and 1996.

Foyt raced three times in the NASCAR Craftsman Truck Series, with a best finish of 18th in the 1995 GM Goodwrench/Delco Battery 200, in which he qualified ninth.

Smokey Yunick wrote in his autobiography that, "A.J. Foyt, I think, was the greatest race driver there ever has been in U.S. racing history so far...A.J. Foyt could beat your ass in anything that had a motor and wheels."

== Career summary ==
- Foyt drove in the Indianapolis 500 for 35 consecutive years, winning four times.
- Foyt is the only driver to win the Indy 500 in both front and rear-engined cars.
- Foyt is the only driver to win the 24 Hours of Le Mans (with Dan Gurney), and the Indianapolis 500 in the same year (1967).
- He is the only driver with victories in the Indianapolis 500, Daytona 500, 24 Hours of Daytona (1983 and 1985 with co-driver Bob Wollek), 24 Hours of Le Mans, and 12 Hours of Sebring (in 1985, with co-driver Bob Wollek).
- He is one of twelve drivers to complete the Triple Crown of endurance racing (12 Hours of Sebring, 24 Hours of Daytona, and 24 Hours of Le Mans).
- He has 41 USAC Stock Car wins and 50 Sprint Car, Midget, and Dirt Champ Car wins.
- He won the 1975 and 1976 Australian Speedcar Grand Prix at the Liverpool International Speedway in Sydney.
- He won twelve championships in various categories.
- Foyt won the 1976 and 1977 IROC championships.
- Foyt won seven NASCAR races.
- Foyt and Mario Andretti are the only drivers to win both the Indianapolis 500 Mile Race and the Daytona 500.
- Foyt is the last living driver who started in the Races of Two Worlds in 1958 at Autodromo Nazionale Monza.
- Foyt holds the closed course speed record driving the Oldsmobile Aerotech at an average speed of 257.123 miles per hour (413.799 km/h), set in 1987, on a test track near Fort Stockton, Texas.
- Foyt's USAC win total is 138. He never won a CART event.

=== Indianapolis 500 records ===
Foyt holds numerous career records at the Indianapolis 500, including being the first of four drivers to have won four times, most consecutive and career starts (35), most races led (13), most times led (39), most laps driven, and most miles driven (4,909 laps, 12,272.5 miles).

In 1961, Foyt and Ray Harroun, the first Indianapolis 500 winner, appeared together on I've Got a Secret. Their wins were fifty years apart.

Foyt is the oldest living winner of the Indianapolis 500.

== Car owner ==
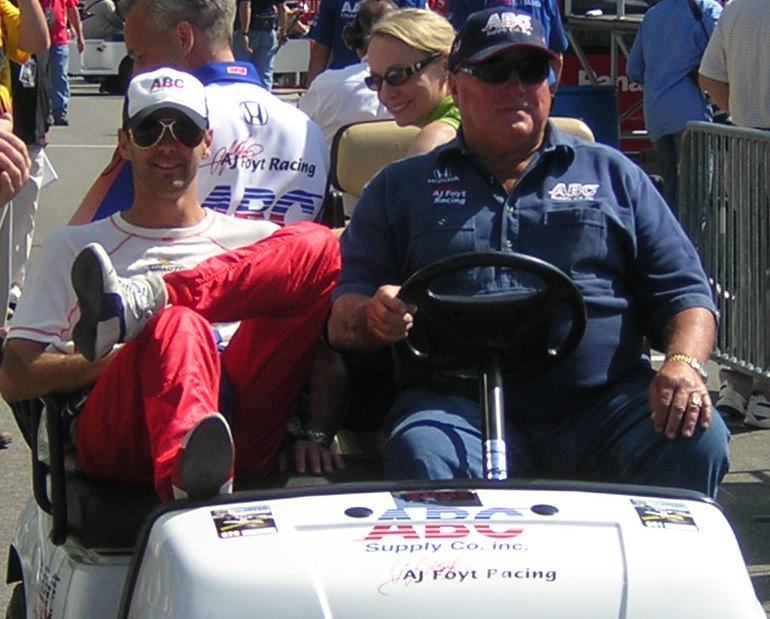
A. J. Foyt (right) and former driver Darren Manning (left) at the 2007 Indianapolis 500.

While an active driver, Foyt entered into a longtime partnership with Jim Gilmore and raced under the Gilmore-Foyt Racing name for many years. The team built its own Coyote chassis from 1966 to 1983.

After retiring as a driver, Foyt owned A. J. Foyt Enterprises in NASCAR and CART. His loyalty to the Indianapolis Motor Speedway led him to become one of the few CART team owners to embrace the Indy Racing League (IRL) on its arrival in 1996, prompting him to field his team in that series. Scott Sharp took a share of the 1996 Indy Racing League (IRL) title driving for Foyt while Kenny Bräck won the 1998 IRL title, also in a Foyt car. Bräck won the 1999 Indianapolis 500 in Foyt's car, putting him in the winner's circle at Indy for the fifth time.

In 1997, Foyt's driver, Billy Boat, was declared the winner of the inaugural IRL race at Texas Motor Speedway. However, Arie Luyendyk claimed he was in the lead when a scoring error by USAC incorrectly gave Boat the checkered flag. When Luyendyk confronted Eddie Gossage about the finish, Foyt shoved Luyendyk into a tulip bed from behind. Luyendyk requested a review of the race; a few days later, USAC reversed its position and declared Luyendyk the winner, though Foyt kept the trophy. The IRL relieved USAC of future scoring duties.

== Personal life ==
In 1955, Foyt married Lucy Zarr. She died in 2023. Foyt is the grandfather of A. J. Foyt IV and Larry Foyt, and was the godfather of John Andretti.

Foyt owns The Foyt Ranches, located in Hockley, Texas and Del Rio, Texas.

== Pop culture references ==
- In season 5, episode 17 of The Office called "Lecture Circuit" (originally aired on February 12, 2009), Michael Scott asks Holly Flax's new boyfriend - named A. J. - "What kind of name is A.J.? What, do you race cars?"

== Awards and honors ==
Foyt has been inducted into the following halls of fame:

- Texas Sports Hall of Fame (1967)
- Auto Racing Hall of Fame (1978)
- National Midget Auto Racing Hall of Fame (1988)
- Motorsports Hall of Fame of America (1989)
- National Sprint Car Hall of Fame (1990)
- International Motorsports Hall of Fame (2000)
- Automotive Hall of Fame (2007)
- USAC Hall of Fame (2012)
- Sebring Hall of Fame (2018)
- Houston Sports Hall of Fame (2019)

== A. J. Foyt Oval Championship ==
In April 2010, the IRL announced the introduction of a championship to be awarded to the best-performing driver on oval tracks in an IndyCar Series season, alongside a similar championship for road course events. The trophy was awarded at the penultimate oval race of the 2010 and 2011 seasons, as the IRL wanted to focus exclusively on the Drivers' Championship for the season finale; for the 2012 season, however, it was awarded in the season-ending MAVTV 500. It was named the A. J. Foyt Oval Championship in honor of Foyt because of a poll conducted on the IndyCar Series website from late May to early June. After 2012, the oval and road course championships were both discontinued.

A. J. Foyt Oval Championship winners
Season	Driver	Team	Ref
2010	(United Kingdom) Dario Franchitti	Chip Ganassi Racing	
2011	(New Zealand) Scott Dixon	Chip Ganassi Racing	
2012	(United States) Ryan Hunter-Reay	Andretti Autosport	

== Racing record ==
=== Complete USAC Championship Car results ===
(key) (Races in bold indicate pole position)

Year	Team	1	2	3	4	5	6	7	8	9	10	11	12	13	14	15	16	17	18	19	20	21	22	23	24	25	26	27	28	Rank	Points	Ref
1957	Hoover Motor Express	INDY	LAN	MIL	DET	ATL	SPR; 9	MIL; 23	DUQ; DNQ	SYR; DNQ	ISF; DNQ	TRE; 11	SAC; 9	PHX; 7																26th	160	
1958	Al Dean Racing	TRE	INDY; 16	MIL; 21	LAN; 2	ATL; 11	SPR; 11	MIL; 7	DUQ; 8	SYR; 14	ISF; 8	TRE; 11	SAC; 3	PHX; 4																10th	700	
1959	Al Dean Racing	DAY; 8	TRE; DNQ	INDY; 10	MIL; 3	LAN; 13	SPR; 15	MIL; 25	DUQ; DNQ	SYR; 9	ISF; 3		PHX; 2	SAC; DNS																5th	910.2	
1959	Racing Associates											TRE; 19																		5th	910.2	
1960	Bowes Racing	TRE; 4	INDY; 25	MIL; 2	LAN; 16	SPR; 17	MIL; 2	DUQ; 1	SYR; 3	ISF; 1	TRE; 3	SAC; 1	PHX; 1																	1st	1680	
1961	Bowes Racing	TRE; 5	INDY; 1	MIL; 22	LAN; 1	MIL; 3	SPR; 2	DUQ; 1	SYR; 18	**ISF**; 1	TRE; 14	SAC; 12	PHX; 15																	1st	2150	
1962	Bowes Racing	TRE; 1	INDY; 23	**MIL**; 1	LAN; 1	**TRE**; 7																								2nd	1950	
1962	Lindsey Hopkins						SPR; 7	MIL; 2	**LAN**; 4	SYR; 2	ISF; 16	**TRE**; 4																		2nd	1950	
1962	Ansted-Thompson Racing												**SAC**; 1	PHX; 2																2nd	1950	
1963	Ansted-Thompson Racing	TRE; 1	INDY; 3	MIL; 4	LAN; 1	**TRE**; 1	**SPR**; 2	MIL; 2	DUQ; 1	ISF; 3	TRE; 1	SAC; 2	PHX; 8																	1st	2950	
1964	Ansted-Thompson Racing	PHX; 1	**TRE**; 1	INDY; 1	MIL; 1	LAN; 1	TRE; 1	SPR; 1	MIL; 26	DUQ; 1	**ISF**; 1	TRE; 20	SAC; 1	PHX; 19																1st	2900	
1965	Ansted-Thompson Racing	**PHX**; 19	**TRE**; 17	**INDY**; 15	**MIL**; 16	LAN; 17	PIP	**TRE**; 1	IRP; 4	**ATL**; 19	LAN; 2	MIL; 19	SPR; 1	**MIL**; 2	**DUQ**; 3	**ISF**; 1	**TRE**; 1	SAC; 2	PHX; 1											2nd	2500	
1966	Ansted-Thompson Racing	PHX; 11	TRE; 15	INDY; 26	MIL; DNQ	LAN	ATL; 29	PIP	IRP; 24	LAN; DNQ	SPR; 3	MIL; 24	DUQ; 7	**ISF**; 2	TRE; 3	SAC; 17	PHX; 17													13th	755	
1967	Ansted-Thompson Racing	PHX; 5	TRE; 15	INDY; 1	MIL; 21	LAN; 5	PIP	MOS; 7	MOS; 7	IRP; 7	LAN; 17	MTR; 2	MTR; 2	SPR; 1	MIL; 8	DUQ; 1	ISF; 2	TRE; 1	SAC; 1	HAN; 4	PHX; 17	RIV; 17								1st	3440	
1968	Sheraton-Thompson Racing	HAN; 4	LVG; 13	PHX; 23	TRE; 21	INDY; 20	MIL; 14	MOS	MOS	LAN	PIP	CDR; 1	NAZ	IRP; 4	IRP; 3	LAN	LAN	MTR; 18	MTR	SPR; 17	MIL; 24	DUQ; 2	ISF; 1	TRE; 24	SAC; 1	MCH; 14	HAN; 1	PHX; 23	RIV; 20	6th	1860	
1969	Sheraton-Thompson Racing	PHX; 21	HAN; 25	**INDY**; 8	MIL; 3	LAN	PIP	CDR; 3	NAZ	TRE; 10	IRP; 5	IRP; 4	MIL; 9	SPR; 5	DOV; 19	DUQ; 3	ISF; 1	BRN; 8	BRN; 8	TRE; 13	SAC	KEN	KEN	PHX; 25	RIV; DNQ					7th	1570	
1970	Sheraton-Thompson Racing	PHX; 4	SON; Wth	TRE; 6	INDY; 10	MIL; 24	LAN	CDR; 3	MCH; 8	IRP; 12	SPR; 15	MIL; 7	ONT; 15	DUQ; 10	ISF; 3	SED; DNQ	TRE	SAC	PHX; 23											9th	1105	
1971	Thompson Racing	RAF	RAF	PHX; 17	TRE	INDY; 3	MIL; 20	POC; 3	MCH; 17	MIL; 2	ONT; 16	TRE; 5	PHX; 1																	2nd	2320	
1972	Thompson Racing	PHX; 8	TRE	INDY; 25	MIL	MCH	POC	MIL	ONT; 30	TRE; 22	PHX; 21																			36th	75	
1973	Gilmore Racing	TWS; 11	TRE; 1	**TRE**; 11	INDY; 25	MIL; Wth	POC; 1	MCH; 13	MIL; 25	ONT	ONT	ONT; 10	MCH; 13	MCH; 14	TRE; 20	TWS; 10	PHX; Wth													10th	1580	
1974	Gilmore Racing	**ONT**; 1	ONT	**ONT**; 30	PHX; 3	TRE; DNQ	**INDY**; 15	**MIL**; 6	POC; 27	MCH; 13	**MIL**; 2	**MCH**; 24	**TRE**; 1	**TRE**; 4	PHX; 4															8th	1510	
1975	Gilmore Racing	**ONT**; 1	ONT	**ONT**; 1	PHX; 3	TRE; 1	**INDY**; 3	**MIL**; 1	POC; 1	**MCH**; 1	MIL; 20	**MCH**; 7	**TRE**; 2	PHX; 1																1st	4920	
1976	Gilmore Racing	PHX; 21	**TRE**; 18	INDY; 2	MIL; 17	POC; 31	**MCH**; 3	**TWS**; 1	**TRE**; 19	MIL	**ONT**; 23	**MCH**; 1	**TWS**; 11	PHX; Wth																7th	1720	
1977	Gilmore Racing	ONT; 1	PHX; 2	TWS; 14	TRE	INDY; 1	MIL	**POC**; 15	MOS; 1	MCH; DNQ	TWS; 19	MIL	ONT; 2	MCH	TRE; C	PHX														4th	2840	
1978	Gilmore Racing	PHX; 3	ONT; 4	TWS; 17	TRE; 2	INDY; 7	MOS; 16	MIL; 19	POC; 8	MCH; 16	ATL; 4	TWS; 1	MIL; 4	ONT; 28	MCH; 5	**TRE**; 19	SIL; 1	BRH; 4	PHX; 2											5th	3024	
1979	Gilmore Racing	**ONT**; 1	**TWS**; 1	INDY; 2	**MIL**; 1	**POC**; 1	**TWS**; 1	MIL; 12																						1st	3320	
1980	Gilmore Racing	ONT; Wth	INDY; 14	MIL	POC; 19	MOH																								35th	45	
1981-82	Gilmore Racing	INDY; 13	**POC**; 1	ILL	DUQ	ISF	INDY; 19																							4th	1045	
1982-83	Gilmore Racing	SPR	DUQ	NAZ	INDY; 31																									38th	5	
1983-84	Gilmore Racing	DUQ	INDY; 6																											7th	400	

=== CART ===
(key) (Races in bold indicate pole position)

Year	Team	No.	1	2	3	4	5	6	7	8	9	10	11	12	13	14	15	16	17	Rank	Points	Ref
1979	Gilmore Racing	14	PHX	ATL	ATL	INDY; 2	TRE	TRE	MCH	MCH	WGL	TRE	ONT	MCH	ATL	PHX				NC	-	
1980	Gilmore Racing	14	ONT; DNS	INDY; 14	MIL	POC; 19	MOH	MCH	WGL	MIL	ONT	MCH	MEX	PHX						**44th**	**45**	
1981	Gilmore Racing	14	PHX	MIL	ATL	ATL	MCH; 26	RIV	MIL	MCH	WGL	MEX	PHX							**NC**	**0**	
1982	Gilmore Racing	14	PHX	ATL	MIL; 2	CLE; 22	MCH; 20	MIL	POC; 20	RIV	ROA	MCH; 23	PHX							**28th**	**22**	
1983	Gilmore Racing	14	ATL	INDY; 31	MIL	CLE	MCH	ROA	POC	RIV	MOH	MCH	CPL	LAG	PHX					**NC**	**0**	
1984	Gilmore Racing	14	LBH	PHX	INDY; 6	MIL	POR	MEA; DNQ	CLE	MCH; 22	ROA	POC; 27	MOH	SAN	MCH; Wth	PHX; 14	LAG	LVS; 22		**21st**	**22**	
1985	A. J. Foyt Enterprises	14	LBH	INDY; 28	MIL	POR	MEA; 23	CLE	MCH; Wth	ROA	POC; 24	MOH	SAN; 24	MCH	LAG	PHX; 23	MIA; 20			**49th**	**0**	
1986	A. J. Foyt Enterprises	14	PHX; 17	LBH	INDY; 24	MIL; 19	POR	MEA	CLE	TOR	MCH; 9	POC; 4	MOH	SAN	MCH; 16	ROA	LAG	PHX; 22	MIA; 23	**21st**	**16**	
1987	A. J. Foyt Enterprises	14	LBH	PHX	INDY; 19	MIL; 6	POR	MEA	CLE	TOR	MCH; 26	POC; 7	ROA	MOH	NAZ; 7	LAG	MIA; 25			**23rd**	**14**	
1988	A. J. Foyt Enterprises	14	PHX; 4	LBH; 11	INDY; 26	MIL; 5	POR; 15	CLE; 11	TOR; 15	MEA; 17	MCH	POC; 16	MOH; 22	ROA; 10	NAZ; 17	LAG; 24	MIA; 25			**16th**	**29**	
1989	A. J. Foyt Enterprises	14	PHX; 22	LBH; 25	INDY; 5	MIL; 20	DET; 26	POR; DNS	CLE	MEA; 23	TOR; 17	MCH; 18	POC; 21	MOH; 21	ROA; 22	NAZ; 14	LAG			**18th**	**10**	
1990	A. J. Foyt Enterprises	14	PHX; 22	LBH; 24	INDY; 6	MIL; 9	DET; 17	POR; 10	CLE; 7	MEA; 5	TOR; 16	MCH; 6	DEN; 10	VAN; 13	MOH; 15	ROA; 20	NAZ	LAG		**11th**	**42**	
1991	Copenhagen Racing	14	SRF	LBH	PHX	INDY; 28	MIL; 16	DET; 23	POR; 16	CLE; 20	MEA; 13	TOR	MCH; 17	DEN	VAN	MOH	ROA	NAZ; 16	LAG	**33rd**	**0**	
1992	Walker Motorsport	17	SRF; 23																	**26th**	**4**	
1992	Copenhagen Racing	14		PHX; Wth	LBH	INDY; 9	DET	POR	MIL	NHA	TOR	MCH	CLE	ROA	VAN	MOH	NAZ	LAG		**26th**	**4**	
1993	Copenhagen Racing	14	SRF	PHX	LBH	INDY; Wth	MIL	DET	POR	CLE	TOR	MCH	NHA	ROA	VAN	MOH	NAZ	LAG		NC	-	

=== Indianapolis 500 results ===
Year	Chassis	Engine	Start	Finish
1958	Kuzma/Brawner	Offy	12th	16th
1959	Kuzma	Offy	17th	10th
1960	Kurtis/ Epperly	Offy	16th	25th
1961	Trevis	Offy	7th	**1st**
1962	Trevis	Offy	5th	23rd
1963	Trevis	Offy	8th	**3rd**
1964	Watson	Offy	5th	**1st**
1965	Lotus 34	Ford	**1st**	15th
1966	Lotus 38	Ford	18th	26th
1967	Coyote 67	Ford	4th	**1st**
1968	Coyote 68	Ford	8th	20th
1969	Coyote/Kuzma	Ford	**1st**	8th
1970	Coyote 70	Ford	3rd	10th
1971	Coyote 71	Ford	6th	**3rd**
1972	Coyote 72	Foyt	17th	25th
1973	Coyote 73	Foyt	23rd	25th
1974	Coyote 73	Foyt	**1st**	15th
1975	Coyote 75	Foyt	**1st**	**3rd**
1976	Coyote 75	Foyt	5th	**2nd**
1977	Coyote 75	Foyt	4th	**1st**
1978	Coyote 75	Foyt	20th	7th
1979	Parnelli VPJ6C	Cosworth DFX	6th	**2nd**
1980	Parnelli VPJ6C	Cosworth DFX	12th	14th
1981	Coyote 81	Cosworth DFX	3rd	13th
1982	March 82C	Cosworth DFX	3rd	19th
1983	March 83C	Cosworth DFX	24th	31st
1984	March 84C	Cosworth DFX	12th	6th
1985	March 85C	Cosworth DFX	21st	28th
1986	March 86C	Cosworth DFX	21st	24th
1987	Lola T87/00	Cosworth DFX	4th	19th
1988	Lola T87/00	Cosworth DFX	22nd	26th
1989	Lola T89/00	Cosworth DFX	10th	5th
1990	Lola T90/00	Chevrolet 265A	8th	6th
1991	Lola T91/00	Chevrolet 265A	2nd	28th
1992	Lola T92/00	Chevrolet 265A	23rd	9th
1993	Lola T93/00	Ford Cosworth XB	Withdrew	

=== Indianapolis 500 qualifying results ===
Year	Att #	Date	Time	Qual; Day	Car #	Laps	Qual; Time	Qual; Speed	Rank	Start	Comment
1967	22	05-13	22	1	14	2	—	—	—	—	PULLED OFF
1967	28	05-13	28	1	14	4	—	166.289	4	4	
1968	8	05-18	8	1	1	4	—	166.821	8	8	
1969	4	05-24	4	2	6	4	3:31.0600	170.568	1	1	
1970	5	05-16	5	1	7	4	—	170.004	3	3	
1971	2	05-15	2	1	9	4	3:26.5200	174.317	6	6	
1972	3	05-13	17:57	1	2	0	—	—	—	—	BLOWN ENGINE
1972	30	05-20	11:30	2	2	4	3:10.4800	188.996	5	16	
1973	25	05-12	14:27	1	14	3	—	—	—	—	WAVED OFF
1973	27	05-12	15:20	1	14	4	3:10.5500	188.927	32	23	
1974	8	05-11	11:05	1	14	4	3:07.8600	191.632	1	1	
1975	4	05-10	11:38	1	14	1	—	—	—	—	PULLED OFF
1975	19	05-10	16:10	1	14	4	3:05.5900	193.976	1	1	
1976	12	05-15	16:55	1	14	4	3:14.3200	185.261	10	5	
1977	1	05-14	11:02	1	14	4	3:06.0800	193.465	—	—	ATTEMPT WITHDRAWN BY USAC
1977	12	05-14	12:39	1	14	4	3:05.0300	194.563	5	4	
1978	14	05-20	12:47	1	14	0	—	—	—	—	PULLED OFF
1978	39	05-21	13:24	3	14	4	2:59.8900	200.122	3	21	
1979	33	05-13	16:32	1	14	4	3:09.8600	189.613	6	6	
1980	24	05-10	14:24	1	14	0	—	—	—	—	
1980	32	05-10	16:14	1	14	1	—	—	—	—	FLAGGED OFF; RAIN
1980	33	05-10	17:59	1	14	4	3:14.0700	185.500	16	12	
1981	2	05-09	15:49	1	14	4	3:03.6000	196.078	6	3	
1982	25	05-15	16:23	1	14	4	2:57.0500	203.332	3	3	
1983	30	05-21	14:59	2	14	4	3:00.4000	199.557	14	24	
1984	25	05-12	15:23	1	14	1	—	—	—	—	PULLED OFF
1984	39	05-12	17:39	1	4	4	2:56.5920	203.860	12	12	
1985	10	05-11	11:55	1	14	4	2:54.9420	205.782	27	21	
1986	36	05-11	12:09	2	14	4	2:48.8460	213.212	5	22	
1987	21	05-09	17:07	1	14	4	2:50.6690	210.935	4	4	
1988	4	05-14	—	1	14	0	—	—	—	—	PULLED OFF
1988	31	05-14	17:23	1	14	3	—	—	—	—	PULLED OFF
1988	47	05-21	14:35	3	41	4	2:51.6770	209.696	15	22	
1989	15	05-14	13:24	1	14	4	2:45.7950	217.136	12	10	
1990	24	05-19	11:32	1	14	4	2:43.3210	220.425	8	8	
1991	1	05-11	11:00	1	14	4	2:41.8390	222.443	6	2	
1992	23	05-09	17:57	1	14	3	—	—	—	—	PULLED OFF
1992	28	05-10	12:20	2	14	4	2:41.5810	222.798	16	23	

=== 24 Hours of Le Mans results ===
Year	Team	Co-Drivers	Car	Class	Laps	Pos.	Class Pos.
1967	(United States) Ford Motor Company (United States) Shelby-American Inc.	(United States) Dan Gurney	Ford Mk IV	P +5.0	388	**1st**	**1st**

=== NASCAR ===
(key) (Bold – Pole position awarded by qualifying time. Italics – Pole position earned by points standings or practice time. * – Most laps led.)

==== Grand National Series ====
NASCAR Grand National Series results
Year	Team	No.	Make	1	2	3	4	5	6	7	8	9	10	11	12	13	14	15	16	17	18	19	20	21	22	23	24	25	26	27	28	29	30	31	32	33	34	35	36	37	38	39	40	41	42	43	44	45	46	47	48	49	50	51	52	53	54	55	56	57	58	59	60	61	62	NGNC	Pts	Ref
1963	Nichels Engineering	02	Pontiac	BIR	GGS	THS	RSD; 2	DAY; 3	DAY	DAY; 27	PIF	AWS	HBO																																																					NA	-	
1963	Smokey Yunick	13	Chevy											ATL; 37	HCY	BRI	AUG	RCH	GPS	SBO	BGS	MAR	NWS	CLB	THS	DAR	ODS	RCH	CLT	BIR	ATL	DAY; 11	MBS	SVH	DTS	BGS	ASH	OBS	BRR	BRI	GPS	NSV	CLB	AWS	PIF	BGS	ONA	DAR	HCY	RCH	MAR	DTS	NWS	THS	CLT	SBO	HBO	RSD								NA	-	
1964	Matthews Racing	00	Ford	CON	AUG	JSP	SVH	RSD; 21	DAY	DAY; 4	DAY; 24	RCH	BRI	GPS	BGS	ATL; 11	AWS	HBO	PIF	CLB	NWS	MAR	SVH	DAR	LGY	HCY	SBO	CLT	GPS	ASH	ATL	CON	NSV	CHT	BIR	VAL	PIF																													NA	-	
1964	Nichels Engineering	47	Dodge																																			DAY; 1	ODS	OBS	BRR	ISP	GLN	LIN	BRI	NSV	MBS	AWS	DTS	ONA	CLB	BGS	STR	DAR	HCY	RCH	ODS	HBO	MAR	SVH	NWS	CLT; 24	HAR	AUG	JAC	NA	-	
1965	Holman-Moody	00	Ford	RSD; 10	DAY	DAY	DAY	PIF	ASW	RCH	HBO																																																							NA	-	
1965	Wood Brothers	41	Ford									ATL; 30	GPS	NWS	MAR	CLB	BRI	DAR	LGY	BGS	HCY	CLT	CCF	ASH	HAR	NSV	BIR	ATL	GPS	MBS	VAL	DAY; 1	ODS	OBS	ISP	GLN	BRI	NSV	CCF	AWS	SMR	PIF	AUG	CLB	DTS	BLV	BGS	DAR	HCY	LIN	ODS	RCH	MAR	NWS	CLT; 6*	HBO	CAR	DTS								NA	-	
1966	Junior Johnson	47	Ford	AUG	RSD; 31	DAY	DAY; 11	DAY; 33	CAR	BRI	ATL	HCY	CLB	GPS	BGS	NWS	MAR	DAR	LGY	MGR	MON	RCH	CLT	DTS	ASH	PIF	SMR	AWS	BLV	GPS	DAY	ODS	BRR	OXF	FON	ISP	BRI	SMR	NSV	ATL	CLB	AWS	BLV	BGS	DAR	HCY	RCH	HBO	MAR	NWS																NA	-	
1966	Matthews Racing	27	Ford																																																CLT; 43	CAR														NA	-	
1967	Matthews Racing	27	Ford	AUG	RSD; 26	DAY; 2*	DAY	DAY; 37	AWS	BRI	GPS	BGS	ATL; 27	CLB	HCY	NWS	MAR	SVH	RCH	DAR	BLV	LGY	CLT	ASH	MGR	SMR	BIR	CAR	GPS	MGY	DAY; 32	TRN	OXF	FDA	ISP	BRI	SMR	NSV	ATL	BGS	CLB	SVH	DAR	HCY	RCH	BLV	HBO	MAR	NWS	CLT; 22	CAR; 4	AWS														NA	-	
1968	Matthews Racing	27	Ford	MGR	MGY	RSD; 43	DAY; 12	BRI	RCH	ATL	HCY	GPS	CLB	NWS	MAR	AUG	AWS	DAR	BLV	LGY	CLT	ASH	MGR	SMR	BIR	CAR	GPS																																							NA	-	
1968	Bondy Long	29	Ford																									DAY; 30	ISP	OXF	FDA	TRN	BRI	SMR	NSV	ATL	CLB	BGS	AWS	SBO	LGY	DAR	HCY	RCH	BLV	HBO	MAR	NWS	AUG																	NA	-	
1968	Holman-Moody	11	Ford																																															CLT; 10	CAR	JFC														NA	-	
1969	Jack Bowsher & Associates	1	Ford	MGR	MGY	**RSD**; 2																																													CLT; 40	SVH	AUG	CAR	JFC	MGR	TWS									NA	-	
1969	Jack Bowsher & Associates	11	Ford				DAY; 4	DAY	DAY; 4	CAR	AUG	BRI	ATL	CLB	HCY	GPS	RCH	NWS	MAR	AWS	DAR	BLV	LGY	CLT	MGR	SMR	MCH	KPT	GPS	NCF	DAY	DOV	TPN	TRN	BLV	BRI	NSV	SMR	ATL	MCH	SBO	BGS	AWS	DAR	HCY	RCH	TAL	CLB	MAR	NWS																NA	-	
1970	Jack Bowsher & Associates	11	Ford	RSD; 1	DAY	DAY; 14	DAY; 32	RCH	CAR	SVH	ATL	BRI	TAL	NWS	CLB	DAR	BLV	LGY	CLT	SMR	MAR	MCH	RSD	HCY	KPT	GPS	DAY	AST	TPN	TRN	BRI	SMR	NSV	ATL	CLB	ONA	MCH	TAL	BGS	SBO	DAR	HCY	RCH	DOV	NCF	NWS	CLT	MAR	MGR	CAR	LGY															NA	-	
1971	Wood Brothers	21	Mercury	RSD	DAY; 2*	DAY	**DAY**; 3	**ONT**; 1*	RCH	CAR	HCY	BRI	**ATL**; 1*	CLB	GPS	SMR	NWS	MAR	DAR	SBO	TAL	ASH	KPT	CLT	DOV	MCH	RSD	HOU	GPS																																					NA	-	
1971	Holman-Moody	52	Mercury																											DAY; 38	BRI	AST	ISP	TRN	NSV	ATL	BGS	ONA	MCH	TAL	CLB	HCY	DAR	MAR																						NA	-	
1971	Matthews Racing	27	Chevy																																										CLT; 30	DOV	CAR; 34	MGR	RCH	NWS	TWS															NA	-	

==== Winston Cup Series ====
NASCAR Winston Cup Series results
Year	Team	No.	Make	1	2	3	4	5	6	7	8	9	10	11	12	13	14	15	16	17	18	19	20	21	22	23	24	25	26	27	28	29	30	31	NWCC	Pts	Ref
1972	Wood Brothers Racing	21	Mercury	**RSD**; 28	DAY; 1*	RCH	**ONT**; 1*	CAR	ATL; 2	BRI	DAR	NWS	MAR	TAL	CLT	DOV	MCH	RSD	TWS	DAY	BRI	TRN	ATL	TAL	MCH	NSV	DAR	RCH	DOV	MAR	NWS			**TWS**; 2	NA	0	
1972	Wood Brothers Racing	41	Mercury																													CLT; 4	CAR		NA	0	
1973	A. J. Foyt Enterprises	50	Chevy	RSD	DAY; 4	RCH	CAR	BRI	ATL; 27	NWS	DAR	MAR	TAL	NSV	CLT	DOV	TWS	RSD	MCH	DAY; 37	BRI	ATL	TAL	NSV	DAR	RCH	DOV	NWS	MAR	CLT	CAR				NA	0	
1974	A. J. Foyt Enterprises	50	Chevy	RSD	DAY; 5	RCH	CAR	BRI	ATL	DAR	NWS	MAR	TAL	NSV	DOV	CLT	RSD	MCH	DAY; 29	BRI	NSV	ATL	POC	TAL	MCH	DAR	RCH	DOV	NWS	MAR					44th	41.22	
1974	Ellington Racing	28	Chevy																												CLT; 26	CAR	ONT; 4		44th	41.22	
1975	Ellington Racing	28	Chevy	RSD	DAY; 11	RCH	CAR	BRI	ATL; 35	NWS	DAR	MAR	TAL	NSV	DOV	CLT	RSD	MCH	DAY; 24	NSV	POC	TAL	MCH; 30*	DAR	DOV	NWS	MAR	CLT; 21	RCH	CAR; 5	BRI	ATL	ONT; 14		NA	0	
1976	Ellington Racing	28	Chevy	RSD	DAY; 22*	CAR; 32	RCH	BRI	ATL	NWS	DAR	MAR	TAL	NSV	DOV	CLT	RSD	MCH	**DAY**; 4	NSV	POC	TAL; 22	MCH	BRI	DAR	RCH	DOV	MAR	NWS	CLT; 38	CAR	ATL	ONT		NA	0	
1977	A. J. Foyt Enterprises	51	Chevy	RSD	DAY; 6	RCH	CAR	ATL; 34	NWS	DAR	BRI	MAR	**TAL**; 38	NSV	DOV	CLT	RSD	MCH	DAY; 5	NSV	POC	TAL	MCH	BRI	DAR	RCH	DOV	MAR	NWS	CLT; 7	CAR	ATL	ONT; 11		NA	0	
1978	A. J. Foyt Enterprises	51	Buick	RSD	DAY; 32	RCH	CAR	ATL	BRI	DAR	NWS	MAR	TAL; 3	DOV	CLT	NSV	RSD	MCH	DAY	NSV	POC	TAL	MCH	BRI	DAR	RCH	DOV	MAR	NWS	CLT	CAR	ATL	ONT		NA	0	
1979	A. J. Foyt Enterprises	51	Olds	RSD	DAY; 3	CAR	RCH	ATL	NWS	BRI	DAR	MAR	TAL	NSV	DOV	CLT	TWS	RSD	MCH	DAY; 10	NSV	POC	TAL	MCH	BRI	DAR	RCH	DOV	MAR	CLT	NWS	CAR	ATL	ONT	NA	0	
1980	A. J. Foyt Enterprises	51	Olds	RSD	DAY; 31	RCH	CAR	ATL	BRI	DAR	NWS	MAR	TAL	NSV	DOV	CLT	TWS	RSD	MCH	DAY	NSV	POC	TAL	MCH	BRI	DAR	RCH	DOV	NWS	MAR	CLT	CAR	ATL	ONT	101st	70	
1981	A. J. Foyt Enterprises	51	Olds	RSD	DAY; 35	RCH	CAR	ATL; 7	BRI	NWS	DAR	MAR	TAL	NSV	DOV	CLT	TWS	RSD	MCH	DAY; 32	NSV	POC	TAL	MCH	BRI	DAR	RCH	DOV	MAR	NWS	CLT	CAR	ATL	RSD	59th	271	
1982	A. J. Foyt Enterprises	51	Olds	DAY; 21	RCH	BRI	ATL; 39	CAR	DAR	NWS	MAR	TAL	NSV	DOV	CLT	POC	RSD	MCH	DAY	NSV	POC	TAL	MCH	BRI	DAR	RCH	DOV	NWS	CLT	MAR	CAR	ATL	RSD		70th	146	
1983	A. J. Foyt Enterprises	14	Chevy	DAY; 11	RCH	CAR	ATL; 38	DAR	NWS	MAR	TAL; 34	NSV	DOV	BRI	CLT	RSD	POC	MCH	DAY; Wth	NSV	POC	TAL	MCH	BRI	DAR	RCH	DOV	MAR	NWS	CLT	CAR	ATL	RSD		76th	-	
1984	A. J. Foyt Enterprises	14	Olds	DAY; 39	RCH	CAR	ATL; 35	BRI	NWS	DAR	MAR	TAL	NSV	DOV	CLT	RSD	POC	MCH	DAY	NSV	POC	TAL; 36	MCH	BRI	DAR	RCH	DOV	MAR	CLT	NWS	CAR	ATL; 41	RSD		76th	-	
1985	A. J. Foyt Enterprises	14	Olds	DAY; 30	RCH	CAR	ATL; 36	BRI	DAR	NWS	MAR	TAL	DOV	CLT	RSD	POC	MCH	DAY; 30	POC	TAL; 5	MCH	BRI	DAR; 25	RCH	DOV	MAR	NWS	CLT; 32	CAR	ATL; 38	RSD				45th	410	
1986	A. J. Foyt Enterprises	14	Olds	DAY; 29	RCH	CAR	ATL; 17	BRI	DAR	NWS	MAR	TAL	DOV	CLT	RSD	POC	MCH	DAY; 42	POC	TAL; 30	GLN	MCH	BRI	DAR	RCH	DOV	MAR	NWS	CLT; 37	CAR	ATL	RSD			50th	355	
1987	Morgan-McClure Motorsports	14	Olds	DAY; 42	CAR	RCH																													50th	409	
1987	A. J. Foyt Enterprises	14	Olds				ATL; 20	DAR	NWS	BRI	MAR	TAL	CLT	DOV	POC	RSD	MCH	DAY; 38	POC	TAL; 35	GLN	MCH	BRI	DAR	RCH	DOV	MAR	NWS	CLT; 21	CAR	RSD	ATL; 37			50th	409	
1988	A. J. Foyt Enterprises	14	Olds	DAY; 33	RCH	CAR	ATL; 34	DAR	BRI	NWS	MAR	TAL; 28	CLT	DOV	RSD	POC	MCH	DAY; 37	POC	TAL; 12	GLN	MCH	BRI	DAR	RCH	DOV	MAR	CLT; 36	NWS	CAR	PHO	ATL; 31			42nd	523	
1989	A. J. Foyt Enterprises	14	Olds	DAY; 38	CAR	ATL; 28	RCH	DAR	BRI	NWS	MAR	TAL; 16	CLT	DOV	SON	POC	MCH	DAY; 35	POC	TAL; 18	GLN; 37	MCH	BRI	DAR	RCH	DOV	MAR	CLT; Wth^{†}	NWS	CAR	PHO	ATL; 36			40th	527	
1990	A. J. Foyt Enterprises	14	Olds	DAY; 36	RCH	CAR	ATL; DNQ	DAR	BRI	NWS	MAR	TAL	CLT	DOV	SON	POC	MCH	DAY; 38	POC	TAL; 27	GLN	MCH	BRI	DAR	RCH	DOV	MAR	NWS	CLT	CAR	PHO	ATL			62nd	191	
1992	B & B Racing	14	Olds	DAY; 21	CAR	RCH	ATL	DAR	BRI	NWS	MAR	TAL	CLT	DOV	SON	POC	MCH	DAY	POC	TAL	GLN	MCH	BRI	DAR	RCH	DOV	MAR	NWS	CLT	CAR	PHO	ATL			70th	100	
1993	Team Jones Racing	50	Ford	DAY; DNQ	CAR	RCH	ATL	DAR	BRI	NWS	MAR	TAL	SON	CLT	DOV	POC	MCH	DAY	NHA	POC	TAL	GLN	MCH	BRI	DAR	RCH	DOV	MAR	NWS	CLT	CAR	PHO	ATL		NA	-	
1994	A. J. Foyt Enterprises	50	Ford	DAY	CAR	RCH	ATL	DAR	BRI	NWS	MAR	TAL	SON	CLT	DOV	POC	MCH	DAY	NHA	POC	TAL	IND; 30	GLN	MCH	BRI	DAR	RCH	DOV	MAR	NWS	CLT	CAR	PHO	ATL	70th	73	
1995	A. J. Foyt Enterprises	50	Ford	DAY	CAR	RCH	ATL	DAR	BRI	NWS	MAR	TAL	SON	CLT	DOV	POC	MCH	DAY	NHA	POC	TAL	IND; DNQ	GLN	MCH	BRI	DAR	RCH	DOV	MAR	NWS	CLT	CAR	PHO; DNQ	ATL	NA	-	
1996	Barry Owen Racing	50	Ford	DAY	CAR	RCH	ATL	DAR	BRI	NWS	MAR	TAL	SON	CLT	DOV	POC	MCH	DAY	NHA	POC	TAL	IND; DNQ	GLN	MCH	BRI	DAR	RCH	DOV	MAR	NWS	CLT	CAR	PHO	ATL	NA	-	
^{†} - Withdrew after getting injured in practice

===== Daytona 500 =====
Year	Team	Manufacturer	Start	Finish
1963	Nichels Engineering	Pontiac	7	27
1964	Matthews Racing	Ford	8	24
1966	Junior Johnson & Associates	Ford	22	33
1967	Matthews Racing	Ford	5	37
1968	Matthews Racing	Ford	19	12
1969	Jack Bowsher & Associates	Ford	9	4
1970	Jack Bowsher & Associates	Ford	28	32
1971	Wood Brothers Racing	Mercury	**1**	3
1972	Wood Brothers Racing	Mercury	2	**1**
1973	A. J. Foyt Enterprises	Chevrolet	8	4
1974	A. J. Foyt Enterprises	Chevrolet	35	5
1975	Ellington Racing	Chevrolet	9	11
1976	Ellington Racing	Chevrolet	31	22
1977	A. J. Foyt Enterprises	Chevrolet	2	6
1978	A. J. Foyt Enterprises	Buick	3	32
1979	A. J. Foyt Enterprises	Olds	6	3
1980	A. J. Foyt Enterprises	Olds	11	31
1981	A. J. Foyt Enterprises	Olds	10	35
1982	A. J. Foyt Enterprises	Olds	9	21
1983	A. J. Foyt Enterprises	Chevrolet	9	11
1984	A. J. Foyt Enterprises	Olds	32	39
1985	A. J. Foyt Enterprises	Olds	16	30
1986	A. J. Foyt Enterprises	Olds	20	29
1987	Morgan-McClure Motorsports	Olds	41	42
1988	A. J. Foyt Enterprises	Olds	17	33
1989	A. J. Foyt Enterprises	Olds	24	38
1990	A. J. Foyt Enterprises	Olds	13	36
1992	B & B Racing	Olds	39	21
1993	Team Jones Racing	Ford	DNQ	

==== Craftsman Truck Series ====
NASCAR Craftsman Truck Series results
Year	Team	No.	Make	1	2	3	4	5	6	7	8	9	10	11	12	13	14	15	16	17	18	19	20	21	22	23	24	NCTS	Pts	Ref
1995	A. J. Foyt Enterprises	41	Ford	PHO	TUS	SGS	MMR	POR	EVG	I70	LVL	BRI	MLW	CNS	HPT	IRP	FLM	RCH	MAR	NWS	SON	MMR	PHO; 18					81st	109	
1996	A. J. Foyt Enterprises	51	Ford	HOM	PHO	POR	EVG	TUS	CNS	HPT	BRI	NZH	MLW	LVL	I70	IRP	FLM	GLN	NSV	RCH	NHA	MAR	NWS	SON	MMR	PHO; 33		89th	143	
1996	A. J. Foyt Enterprises	56	Ford																								LVS; 28	89th	143	

=== Complete FIA World Drivers' Championship results ===
(key)

Year	Entrant	Chassis	Engine	1	2	3	4	5	6	7	8	9	10	11	WDC	Points
1958	Dean Van Lines	Kuzma	Offenhauser	ARG	MON	NED	500; 16	BEL	FRA	GBR	GER	POR	ITA	MOR	NC	0
1959	Dean Van Lines	Kuzma	Offenhauser	MON	500; 10	NED	FRA	GBR	GER	POR	ITA	USA			NC	0
1960	Bowes Seal Fast	Kurtis Kraft	Offenhauser	ARG	MON	500; 25	NED	BEL	FRA	GBR	POR	ITA	USA		NC	0

=== International Race of Champions ===
(key) (Bold – Pole position. * – Most laps led.)

International Race of Champions results
Year	Make	Q1	Q2	Q3	1	2	3	4	Pos.	Pts	Ref
1973–74	Porsche				RSD; 6	RSD; 5	RSD; 6	DAY; 6	6th	NA	
1974–75	Chevy				MCH; 9	RSD; 3	RSD; 4	DAY; 2	2nd	NA	
1975–76	Chevy				MCH; 3	RSD; 2	RSD; 3	DAY; 2	1st	NA	
1976–77	Chevy				MCH; 3	RSD; 8	**RSD**; 2	**DAY**; 2	1st	NA	
1978–79	Chevy	MCH	MCH; 1	RSD	RSD; 12	ATL			12th	NA	
1985	Chevy				DAY; 3*	MOH; 10	TAL; C	MCH; 11	9th	28	
1989	Chevy				DAY; 7	NZH; 5*	MCH; 7	GLN; 10	7th	36	

== Notes ==
Sporting positions
Preceded by Don White	USAC Stock Car Champion; 1968	Succeeded by Roger McCluskey
Preceded by Bobby Unser	IROC Champion; IROC III (1976), IROC IV (1977)	Succeeded by Al Unser
Preceded by Paul Feldner	USAC Stock Car Champion; 1978–1979	Succeeded by Joe Ruttman
Achievements
Preceded by Bruce McLaren; Chris Amon	Winner of the 24 Hours of Le Mans; 1967 with: Dan Gurney	Succeeded by Pedro Rodriguez; Lucien Bianchi
Preceded by Jim Rathmann; Parnelli Jones; Graham Hill; Johnny Rutherford	Indianapolis 500 Winner; 1961; 1964; 1967; 1977	Succeeded by Rodger Ward; Jim Clark; Bobby Unser; Al Unser
Preceded by Richard Petty	Daytona 500 Winner; 1972	Succeeded by Richard Petty
