= California Automobile Museum =

Museum in Sacramento, California, US

California Automobile Museum (1987–present)

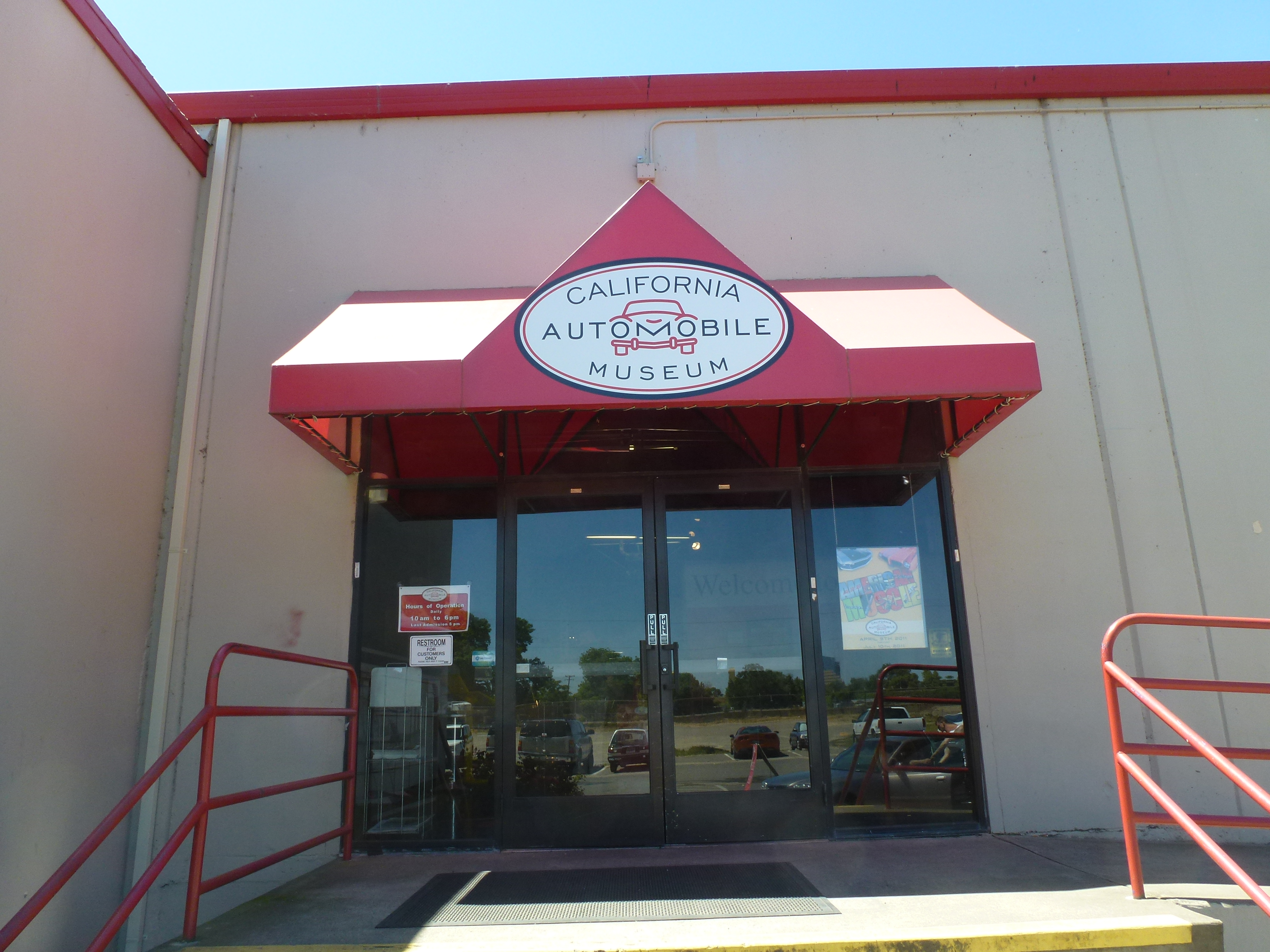
- Front entrance to museum
- Interactive map of the California Automobile Museum (1987–present) area
- Former names: Towe Ford Museum (1987–1997), Towe Auto Museum (1997–2008)

General information
- Status: Operational
- Type: Museum
- Architectural style: Warehouse
- Location: 2200 Front Street, Sacramento, CA 95818-1106, United States of America
- Coordinates: 38.5703872°N 121.5117473°W
- Current tenants: California Automobile Museum
- Groundbreaking: June 1986
- Completed: September 27, 1986
- Opened: May 1, 1987; 39 years ago
- Owner: California Vehicle Foundation

Technical details
- Floor count: 1
- Floor area: 72,000 square feet (6,700 m2)

Other information
- Parking: Free

Website
- http://www.calautomuseum.org/

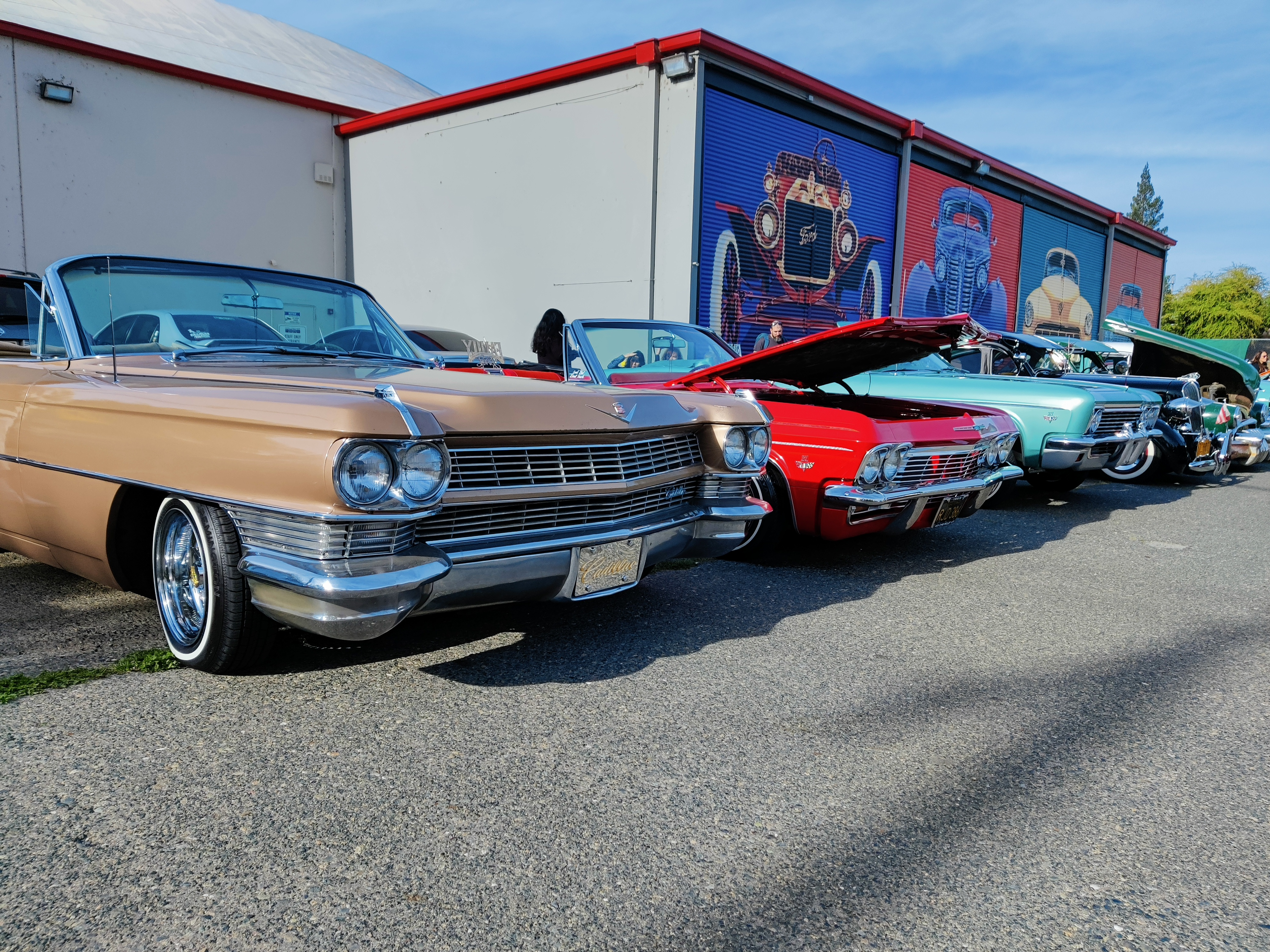
Lowriders at the California Automobile Museum

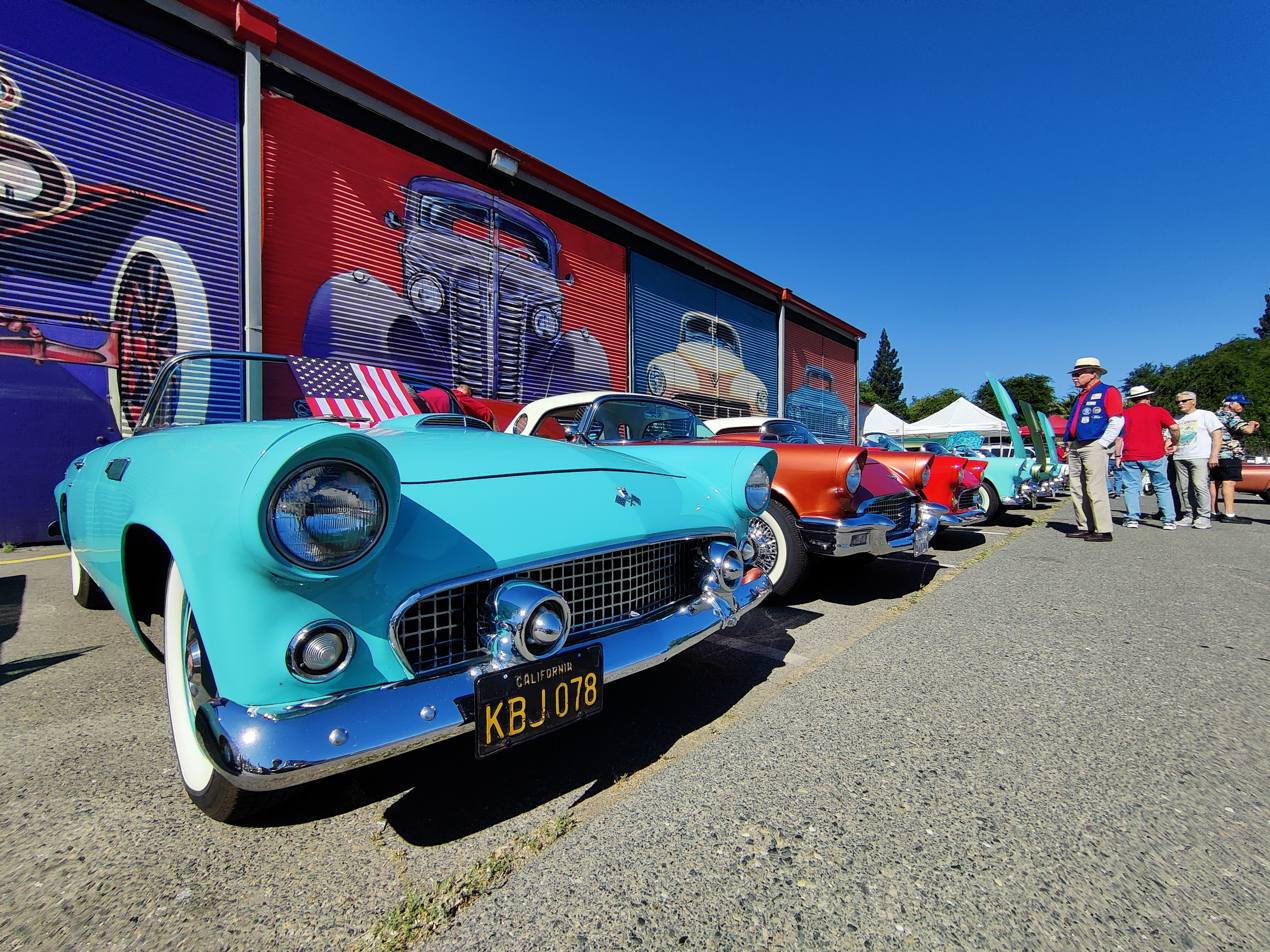
A Thunderbird Club Gathering Outside the Museum

California Automobile Museum is an automobile museum located in Sacramento, California. It has a collection of over 150 classic cars, race cars, muscle cars and early models displayed throughout 72,000 square feet (6,700 m^{2}) of museum space. The mission of the California Automobile Museum is to preserve, exhibit, and teach the story of the automobile and its influence on our lives.

== History ==
The California Automobile Museum was the first automobile museum in the west to be established in perpetuity. Founded in 1983 as the California Vehicle Foundation, the museum opened to the public in 1987 as the Towe Ford Museum, displaying the largest collection of Fords in the world, courtesy of Edward Towe, a Montana banker. Karen McClaflin is the executive director of the museum.

The first car to be donated to the California Automobile Museum was a restored 1938 Buick sedan, a gift from John Joyce, president of the Golden One Credit Union, which is still on display at the museum. In 1997, the museum was renamed the Towe Auto Museum, as they began displaying vehicles of all makes and models. In 2009, the Board of Directors officially changed the name of the museum to the California Automobile Museum, reflecting the expanded mission it has grown into over the last 25 years.

== Exhibits and attractions ==
Approximately 40% of the 150 vehicles are owned by the California Vehicle Foundation, while the remainder are on loan from private exhibitors. The cars on display represent a cross-section of cars driven in California over the last 120 years and are arranged in chronological order. In addition to the static displays, the museum also has "rolling exhibits" which change frequently and display specific types of automobiles like Japanese or micro cars. While the museum can be experienced alone, docents are available to offer personalized tours free of charge.

The museum also offers "Sunday Drives", an opportunity to receive a ride in a museum car free with admission every third Sunday of the month along with five cars to sit in on everyday basis.

Some of the notable cars on display include:

- One of the 40 surviving 1997 General Motors EV1
- A 1982 Porsche 911 SC Targa formerly owned by singer Linda Ronstadt
- A 1978 Kawasaki KZ1000C CHP used in the “CHiPs” TV series
- A 1974 Plymouth Satellite formerly owned by Gov. Jerry Brown
- A 1966 Shelby Cobra 427 formerly owned by Road & Track editor Tony Hogg
- The 1963 Shelby Cobra Replica used in the movie Ford v Ferrari
- A 1956 Cadillac Eldorado formerly owned by actress Rita Hayworth
- A 1951 Nash Rambler Convertible used by Marilyn Monroe to promote her movie "Monkey Business"
- A 1940 Lincoln Town Car formerly owned by Henry Ford's wife Clara Ford
- A 1933 Lincoln KB formerly owned by Bank of America founder A.P. Giannini
- An 1896 Ford Quadricycle Replica
- An 1886 Benz Patent-Motorwagen Replica
- 1909 Model T touring car
