= IROC IV =

Motor car races held in 1976–1977

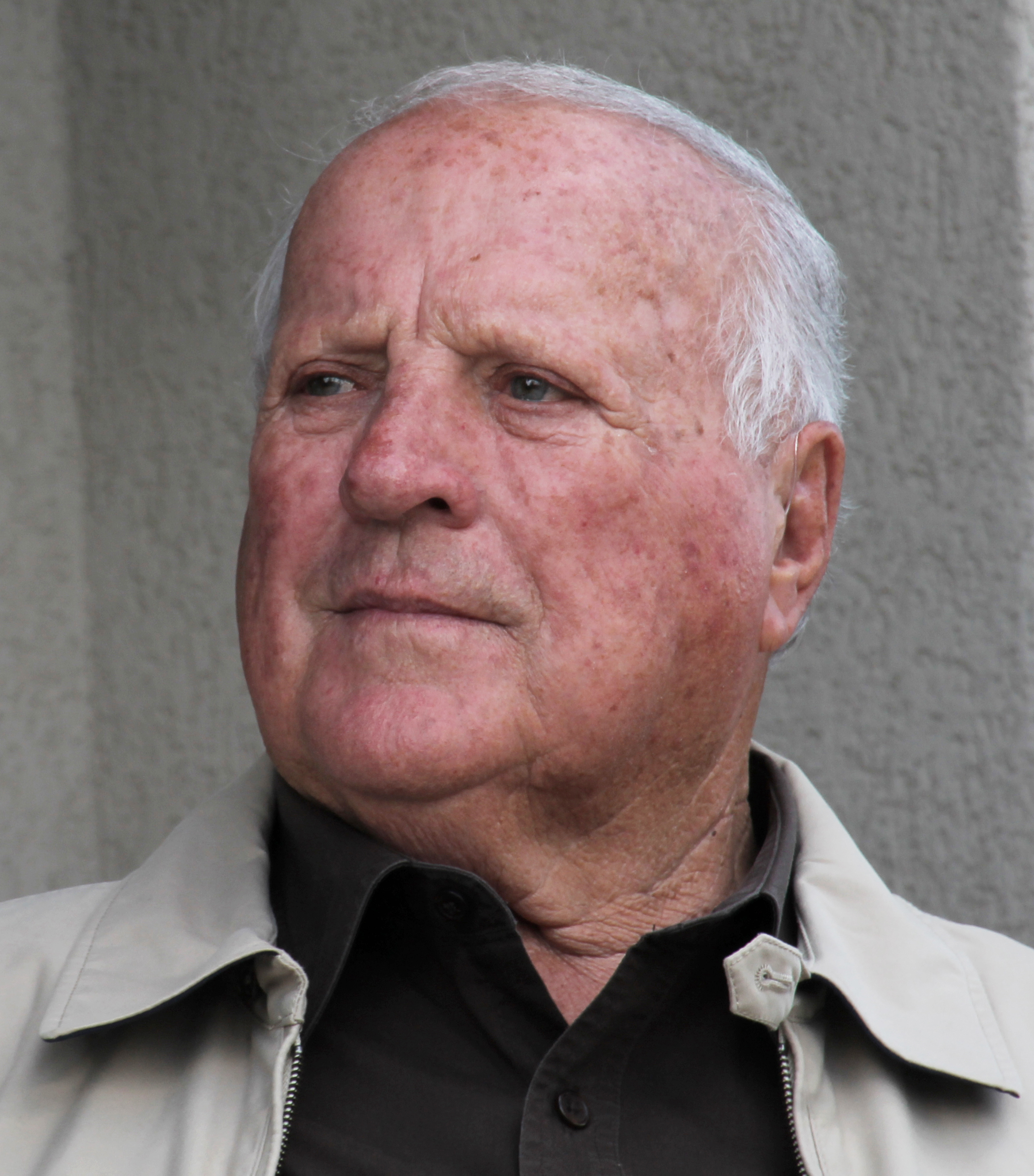
A. J. Foyt (seen in 2015) won the IROC IV championship

IROC IV was the fourth year of IROC competition, which took place over three weekends in 1976 and 1977. It saw the use of the Chevrolet Camaro in all races, and the schedule was held over in its entirety from IROC III. A. J. Foyt won the championship and $50,000 without winning a race for the second year in a row.

The roster of drivers and final points standings were as follows:

Rank	Driver	Winnings	Series
1	(United States) A. J. Foyt	$50,000	USAC Champ Car
2	(United States) Cale Yarborough	$25,000	NASCAR Winston Cup
3	(United States) Bobby Unser	$23,000	USAC Champ Car
4	(United States) Johnny Rutherford	$20,000	USAC Champ Car
5	(United States) Buddy Baker	$18,000	NASCAR Winston Cup
6	(United States) Richard Petty	$15,000	NASCAR Winston Cup
7	(United States) Al Holbert	$13,000	IMSA Camel GT
8	(United States) Al Unser	$10,500	USAC Champ Car
9	(United States) David PearsonAll	$10,500	NASCAR Winston Cup
10	(South Africa) Jody Scheckter3	$5,000	Formula One
11	(United States) Gordon Johncock	$5,000	USAC Champ Car
12	(United Kingdom) James Hunt1	$5,000	Formula One

== Race results ==
=== Michigan International Speedway, Race One ===
1. Buddy Baker
2. Johnny Rutherford
3. A. J. Foyt
4. Jody Scheckter
5. Al Unser
6. Richard Petty
7. Gordon Johncock
8. Al Holbert
9. Cale Yarborough
10. David Pearson
11. Bobby Unser
12. James Hunt

=== Riverside International Raceway, Race Two ===
1. Bobby Unser
2. David Pearson
3. Richard Petty
4. Al Holbert
5. Johnny Rutherford
6. Buddy Baker
7. Al Unser
8. A. J. Foyt
9. Cale Yarborough
10. Gordon Johncock
11. Jody Scheckter

=== Riverside International Raceway, Race Three ===
1. Cale Yarborough
2. A. J. Foyt
3. Jody Scheckter
4. Bobby Unser
5. Al Unser
6. Al Holbert
7. Johnny Rutherford
8. Buddy Baker
9. Richard Petty
10. Gordon Johncock
11. David Pearson

=== Daytona International Speedway, Race Four ===
1. Cale Yarborough
2. A. J. Foyt
3. Bobby Unser
4. Richard Petty
5. Johnny Rutherford
6. David Pearson
7. Al Holbert
8. Buddy Baker
9. Al Unser
