= IROC III =

Motor car races held in 1975–1976

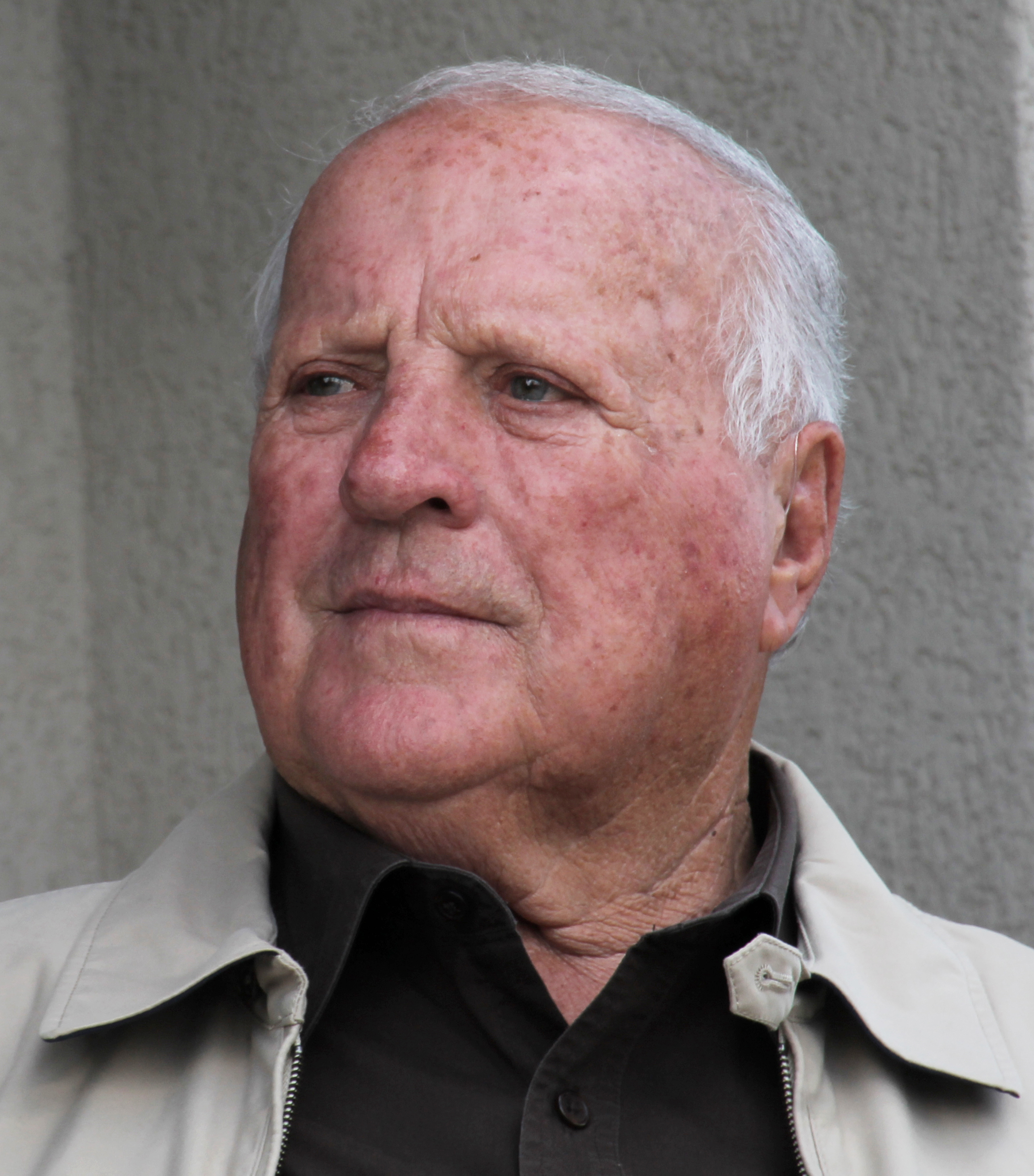
A. J. Foyt (seen in 2015) won the IROC III championship

IROC III was the third year of IROC competition, which took place over three weekends in 1975 and 1976. It saw the use of the Chevrolet Camaro in all races, and the schedule was held over in its entirety from IROC II. A. J. Foyt won the championship and $50,000 without winning a race.

The roster of drivers and final points standings were as follows;

Rank	Driver	Winnings	Series
1	(United States) A. J. Foyt	$50,000	USAC Champ Car
2	(United States) Mario Andretti	$25,000	Formula One
3	(United States) Benny Parsons	$25,000	NASCAR Winston Cup
4	(United States) Bobby Allison	$23,000	NASCAR Winston Cup
5	(United States) David Pearson	$21,000	NASCAR Winston Cup
6	(United States) Al Unser	$15,000	USAC Champ Car
7	(United States) Bobby Unser	$16,000	USAC Champ Car
8	(Brazil) Emerson Fittipaldi	$11,000	Formula One
9	(United Kingdom) Brian Redman	$10,000	SCCA
10	(United States) Richard Petty	$5,000	NASCAR Winston Cup
11	(United Kingdom) James Hunt	$5,000	Formula One
12	(South Africa) Jody Scheckter	$5,000	Formula One

== Race results ==
=== Michigan International Speedway, Race One ===
1. David Pearson
2. Bobby Allison
3. A. J. Foyt
4. Benny Parsons
5. Emerson Fittipaldi
6. Richard Petty
7. Brian Redman
8. Al Unser
9. Mario Andretti
10. Jody Scheckter
11. James Hunt
12. Bobby Unser

=== Riverside International Raceway, Race Two ===
1. Bobby Unser
2. A. J. Foyt
3. Mario Andretti
4. Emerson Fittipaldi
5. Benny Parsons
6. Richard Petty
7. Jody Scheckter
8. Brian Redman
9. Al Unser
10. David Pearson
11. Bobby Allison
12. James Hunt

=== Riverside International Raceway, Race Three ===
1. Bobby Allison
2. Al Unser
3. A. J. Foyt
4. Mario Andretti
5. Bobby Unser
6. James Hunt
7. Brian Redman
8. David Pearson
9. Benny Parsons
10. Jody Scheckter
11. Richard Petty
12. Emerson Fittipaldi

=== Daytona International Speedway, Race Four ===
1. Benny Parsons
2. A. J. Foyt
3. Mario Andretti
4. David Pearson
5. Al Unser
6. Emerson Fittipaldi
7. Bobby Allison
8. Bobby Unser
9. Brian Redman
