= Travis Tiller =

American racing driver (1937–2024)

- Born: May 15, 1937; Haysi, Virginia, U.S.
- Died: November 7, 2024 (aged 87)
- Awards: People's Choice (Back to the Roots)

NASCAR Cup Series career
- 51 races run over 10 years
- Best finish: 34th (1974)
- First race: 1974 Richmond 500 (Richmond)
- Last race: 1983 Talladega 500 (Talladega)
Wins	Top tens	Poles
0	0	0
- Statistics up to date as of August 6, 2025.

Travis Branton Tiller (May 15, 1937 – November 7, 2024) was an American professional stock car racing driver who had previously competed in the NASCAR Winston Cup Series, with his best finish of twelfth occurring at Richmond Fairgrounds Speedway in 1974.

Tiller also competed in the ARCA Permatex SuperCar Series. Tiller died on November 7, 2024, at the age of 87.

Tiller was also a veteran of the United States Marine Corps, enlisting in September 1954 and spending eight years as a "Flying Leatherneck." He was an Aviation Machinist Mate and Crew Chief on an R4Q "Flying Boxcar" at MCAS Cherry Point, and then Plane Captain for the Aircraft Engineering Squadron (AES) of A4 Skyhawk aircraft and HMX-1 Helicopters at MCAS Quantico. While stationed at Quantico, he was also a Middle Weight boxer on the Quantico Boxing Team. During his service, he was awarded 2 Good Conduct and National Defense Service Medals (Korea and Vietnam). His remains are interred at Mountain Home National Cemetery in Mountain Home, Tennessee.

== Motorsports career results ==
=== NASCAR ===
(key) (Bold - Pole position awarded by qualifying time. Italics - Pole position earned by points standings or practice time. * – Most laps led.)

==== Winston Cup Series ====
NASCAR Winston Cup Series results
Year	Team	No.	Make	1	2	3	4	5	6	7	8	9	10	11	12	13	14	15	16	17	18	19	20	21	22	23	24	25	26	27	28	29	30	31	NWCC	Pts	Ref
1974	Tiller Racing	46	Dodge	RSD	DAY	RCH; 18	CAR	BRI; 19	ATL; 35	DAR; DNQ	NWS	MAR; 20	TAL; 35	NSV		CLT; 26	RSD	MCH; 29	DAY	BRI	NSV	ATL	POC; 24	TAL; 38	MCH; 17	DAR	RCH; 12	DOV; 36	NWS; 16	MAR; DNQ	CLT	CAR	ONT		34th	146.44	
1974	Tiller Racing	45	Dodge												DOV; 23																				34th	146.44	
1975	Tiller Racing	46	Dodge	RSD	DAY	RCH	CAR; 16	BRI; 21	ATL	NWS; 21	DAR	MAR; 24	TAL; 23	NSV; 26	DOV; 24	CLT; 30	RSD	MCH; 23	DAY	NSV	POC	TAL	MCH	DAR	DOV	NWS	MAR	CLT	RCH	CAR	BRI; 28	ATL	ONT		36th	922	
1976	Tiller Racing	46	Dodge	RSD	DAY; DNQ	CAR; 18	RCH; 17	BRI; 18	ATL	NWS	DAR	MAR; 26	TAL	NSV	DOV; 23	CLT	RSD	MCH; 22	DAY	NSV	POC; 33	TAL	MCH	BRI	DAR	RCH; 28	DOV	MAR	NWS	CLT	CAR; 32	ATL	ONT; DNQ		37th	816	
1977	Tiller Racing	46	Dodge	RSD	DAY	RCH	CAR	ATL	NWS	DAR	BRI	MAR	TAL	NSV	DOV	CLT	RSD	MCH	DAY	NSV	POC	TAL	MCH	BRI; 21	DAR	RCH	DOV	MAR; 29	NWS	CLT			ONT; DNQ		62nd	243	
1977	Tiller Racing	46	Chevy																												CAR; 32	ATL			62nd	243	
1978	Tiller Racing	46	Dodge	RSD	DAY; Wth	RCH	CAR	ATL	BRI	DAR	NWS	MAR	TAL	DOV	CLT	NSV	RSD	MCH	DAY	NSV	POC	TAL	MCH	BRI	DAR	RCH	DOV	MAR	NWS	CLT	CAR	ATL	ONT		N/A	0	
1979	Tiller Racing	46	Dodge	RSD	DAY; Wth	CAR	RCH	ATL	NWS	BRI	DAR; 36	MAR	TAL; 40	NSV	DOV	CLT; 35	TWS	RSD	MCH	DAY; 36	NSV	POC	TAL	MCH	BRI	DAR	RCH	DOV	MAR	CLT	NWS				61st	229	
1979	Tiller Racing	46	Buick																													CAR; 34	ATL	ONT	61st	229	
1980	Warren Racing	79	Dodge	RSD	DAY	RCH	CAR	ATL	BRI; 28	DAR	NWS	MAR	TAL	NSV	DOV	CLT	TWS	RSD	MCH	DAY	NSV														65th	237	
1980	Tiller Racing	46	Olds																			POC; 40	TAL	MCH	BRI	DAR	RCH	DOV; 26	NWS	MAR	CLT	CAR	ATL; 30	ONT	65th	237	
1981	Tiller Racing	46	Chevy	RSD	DAY	RCH	CAR	ATL	BRI	NWS	DAR	MAR	TAL	NSV	DOV	CLT; DNQ	TWS	RSD	MCH	DAY	NSV	POC	TAL	MCH	BRI	DAR	RCH	DOV	MAR	NWS	CLT	CAR	ATL; 32	RSD	102nd	64	
1982	Tiller Racing	46	Chevy	DAY; Wth	RCH	BRI	ATL	CAR	DAR	NWS	MAR	TAL	NSV	DOV	CLT	POC	RSD	MCH																	51st	316	
1982	Tiller Racing	46	Buick																DAY; 26	NSV	POC	TAL; 28	MCH	BRI	DAR	RCH	DOV	NWS	CLT; 40	MAR	CAR	ATL; 18	RSD		51st	316	
1983	Tiller Racing	46	Buick	DAY; DNQ	RCH	CAR	ATL	DAR; 15	NWS	MAR																									73rd	164	
1983	Tiller Racing	46	Chevy								TAL; DNQ	NSV	DOV	BRI	CLT	RSD	POC	MCH	DAY	NSV	POC	TAL; 39	MCH	BRI	DAR	RCH	DOV	MAR	NWS	CLT; DNQ	CAR	ATL; DNQ	RSD		73rd	164	

===== Daytona 500 =====
Year	Team	Manufacturer	Start	Finish
1976	Tiller Racing	Dodge	DNQ	
1978	Tiller Racing	Dodge	Wth	
1979	Tiller Racing	Dodge	Wth	
1982	Tiller Racing	Chevy	Wth	
1983	Tiller Racing	Buick	DNQ	
