= Terry Bivins =

Racecar driver from Kansas

- Born: September 13, 1943 (age 83); Shawnee Mission, Kansas, U.S.
- Awards: inducted into the Central Auto Racing Boosters Hall of Fame in its first class (2004)

NASCAR Cup Series career
- 28 races run over 3 years
- Best finish: 21st (1976)
- First race: 1975 Champion Spark Plug 400 (Michigan International Speedway)
- Last race: 1977 Southern 500 (Darlington Raceway)
Wins	Top tens	Poles
0	8	0

Terry Bivins (born September 13, 1943) is a retired NASCAR Winston Cup Series driver whose career spanned from 1975 to 1977. Bivins had a career-best finish of fifth in 28 races. He finished disputed second for the 1976 NASCAR Rookie of the Year.

== Career ==
=== Early career ===
Bivins began racing in 1964 with a used 1955 Ford car that he bought at a car lot. He added a roll cage to the car and started racing using the snow tires that came with the car.

=== NASCAR career ===
Bivins ran two NASCAR races in 1975, with a best finish of ninth at Michigan International Speedway.

Bivins ran for NASCAR Rookie of the Year in 1976. Bivins shared a shop with Richard Childress in Winston-Salem, North Carolina. Bivins competed in 18 of 30 events with six top-ten finishes and his career-best finish of fifth at the 1976 Richmond 400 at Richmond Fairgrounds Raceway. Bivins finished in a disputed second place for the Rookie of the Year to Skip Manning. Bivins was announced as the Rookie of the Year after the Ontario Motor Speedway race. Bivins was quoted by the Emporia Gazette in 2007, "I won the Rookie of the Year. We had a celebration dinner. They turned that around and gave it to Skip Manning. (Manning's sponsor) went to NASCAR and told them if his guy didn’t win the sponsor would pull out.”

Bivins competed in eight of 30 events with one top-ten during the 1977 season before retiring from racing out of frustration from losing the Rookie of the Year crown.

In his NASCAR career, Bivins led six laps out of 7,901 - the equivalent of 8,822.8 miles (14,198.9 km). For starting an average of 20th place and finishing an average of 17th, he earned a grand total of $61,725 in total prize winnings. Bivins raced from the age of 31 to the age of 33.

=== Career after NASCAR ===
After retiring from NASCAR, Bivins drove a limited schedule for the ASA before putting a hiatus to his stock car career in 1980. In 2010, Bivins has resumed racing career in a Modified.

Bivins later raced at Lakeside Speedway in Kansas City, Kansas in the Grand National Class. Car #5 and he won three feature races in 2018. He then moved to B-Mods in 2019, 2020 and 2021 when he lived in Lebo, Kansas. Bivins retired from racing in the middle of 2021 with health issues. He had over 400 wins in his career despite not racing during 30 of the years between his first and last race. He won track championships on both pavement and dirt at Lakeside and I-70 Speedway.

== Personal life ==
After retiring from NASCAR, Bivins started his own construction company. He later was a professional fisherman.

Throughout his career, Bivins received help from his stepfather Jim and his mother Kay Jones. Bivins is married to Claudia Bivins. She was always on his pit crew, whether as a video recorder or helping repair the car. Bivins' son James Bivins helped on his pit crew for several decades.

== Career Honors ==
Bivins was elected in the first class (2004) into the Central Auto Racing Boosters Hall of Fame for drivers in the Kansas City area.

== Motorsports results ==
=== NASCAR ===
(key) (Bold – Pole position awarded by qualifying time. Italics – Pole position earned by points standings or practice time. * – Most laps led.)

==== Winston Cup Series ====
NASCAR Winston Cup Series results
Year	Team	No.	Make	1	2	3	4	5	6	7	8	9	10	11	12	13	14	15	16	17	18	19	20	21	22	23	24	25	26	27	28	29	30	NWCC	Pts	Ref
1975	Billy Moyer	63	Chevy	RSD	DAY	RCH	CAR	BRI	ATL	NWS	DAR	MAR	TAL	NSV	DOV	CLT	RSD	MCH	DAY	NSV	POC	TAL	MCH; 9	DAR	DOV; 21	NWS	MAR	CLT	RCH	CAR	BRI	ATL	ONT	77th	138	
1976	Billy Moyer	63	Chevy	RSD	DAY; 8	CAR; 13	RCH; 5	BRI; 24	ATL; 26	NWS	DAR	MAR	TAL	NSV	DOV	CLT	RSD	MCH	DAY		POC; 19	TAL												21st	2099	
1976	Ballard Racing	30	Chevy																	NSV; 22				BRI; 12	DAR; 14	RCH; 9	DOV; 32	MAR; 8	NWS; 9	CLT; 25	CAR; 17	ATL; 22		21st	2099	
1976	Bill Champion	10	Ford																				MCH; 15											21st	2099	
1976	Michael Brocman	50	Chevy																														ONT; 7	21st	2099	
1977	Ballard Racing	03	Chevy	RSD	DAY; QL†																													38th	841	
1977	Don Robertson	25	Chevy			RCH; 14	CAR; 26	ATL; 24	NWS; 17																									38th	841	
1977	Mike Kempton	69	Chevy							DAR; 30	BRI																							38th	841	
1977	Bill Monaghan	81	Chevy									MAR; 11																						38th	841	
1977	Bill Monaghan	80	Chevy										TAL; 9	NSV	DOV	CLT	RSD	MCH	DAY	NSV	POC	TAL	MCH	BRI										38th	841	
1977	Harold Miller	91	Chevy																						DAR; 24	RCH	DOV	MAR	NWS	CLT	CAR	ATL	ONT	38th	841	
^{†} - Qualified but replaced by Walter Ballard

===== Daytona 500 =====
Year	Team	Manufacturer	Start	Finish
1976	Billy Moyer	Chevrolet	19	8
1977	Ballard Racing	Chevrolet	QL^{†}	
^{†} - Qualified but replaced by Walter Ballard

=== ARCA SuperCar Series ===
(key) (Bold – Pole position awarded by qualifying time. Italics – Pole position earned by points standings or practice time. * – Most laps led.)

ARCA SuperCar Series results
Year	Team	No.	Make	1	2	3	4	5	6	7	8	9	10	11	12	13	14	15	16	17	18	19	20	21	ARSC	Pts	Ref
1992	N/A	4	Pontiac	DAY	FIF	TWS; 8	TAL	TOL	KIL	POC															N/A	0	
1992	N/A	53	Pontiac								MCH; 36	FRS	KIL	NSH	DEL	POC	HPT	FRS	ISF	TOL	DSF	TWS	SLM	ATL	N/A	0	
