= Terry Ryan (racing driver) =

Racecar driver from Iowa

- Born: May 13, 1938; Davenport, Iowa, U.S.
- Died: July 13, 2026 (aged 88); DeWitt, Iowa, U.S.

NASCAR Cup Series career
- 12 races run over 2 years
- Best finish: 6th (1976)
- First race: 1976 Daytona 500 (Daytona)
- Last race: 1977 Champion Spark Plug 400 (Michigan)
Wins	Top tens	Poles
0	4	0

Terry Ryan (born May 13, 1938) is an American stock car racing driver. The Davenport, Iowa native competed in the NASCAR Winston Cup Series between 1976 and 1977, getting four top-ten finishes.

== Racing career ==
Ryan competed in the USAC Stock Car and ARCA Racing Series before his NASCAR career. He ran his first USAC race in 1971 with a locally purchased car. In 1975, he won the pole for the ARCA event at Daytona International Speedway.

After receiving new backing and a new car in 1975, Ryan went down to Daytona International Speedway to attempt to qualify for the 1976 Daytona 500. He posted the fifth-fastest time, but the times of A. J. Foyt, Darrell Waltrip and Dave Marcis were disallowed, leaving Ryan on the front row with fellow Iowan Ramo Stott. He finished sixth in that race, and attempted four more races that year; he failed to finish two and finished the other half in the top-ten.

Ryan again made the Daytona 500 in 1977 but fell victim to mechanical issues in that race and the three after that. Turning a page in the second half of the season, Ryan finished three races, steadily improving to get a top-ten in his final race of the year. He attempted Daytona in 1978 but failed to qualify and never again ran NASCAR.

After retiring from NASCAR in 1977, Ryan eventually returned to the vintage racing circuits in 1997; where he was racing as of 2009. Ryan was inducted into the Quad Cities Raceway Hall of Fame in 2008. His old Camaro from the NASCAR days could not be sold because of all of the rule modifications.

== Motorsports career results ==
=== NASCAR ===
(key) (Bold - Pole position awarded by qualifying time. Italics - Pole position earned by points standings or practice time. * – Most laps led.)

==== Winston Cup Series ====
NASCAR Winston Cup Series results
Year	Team	No.	Make	1	2	3	4	5	6	7	8	9	10	11	12	13	14	15	16	17	18	19	20	21	22	23	24	25	26	27	28	29	30	31	NWCC	Pts	Ref
1976	Bill Monaghan	81	Chevy	RSD	DAY; 6	CAR	RCH	BRI	ATL	NWS	DAR	MAR	TAL; 5	NSV	DOV	CLT; 40	RSD	MCH; 32	DAY	NSV	POC	TAL	MCH	BRI	DAR	RCH	DOV	MAR	NWS	CLT	CAR	ATL	ONT; 9		46th	558	
1977	Bill Monaghan	81	Chevy	RSD	DAY; 18	RCH	CAR	ATL	NWS	DAR	BRI	MAR	TAL; 35	NSV; 27	DOV	CLT; 29	RSD	MCH; 17	DAY; 12	NSV	POC	TAL	MCH; 9	BRI	DAR	RCH	DOV	MAR	NWS	CLT	CAR	ATL; 24	ONT		40th	702	
1980	Bill Monaghan	81	Olds	RSD	DAY; DNQ	RCH	CAR	ATL	BRI	DAR	NWS	MAR	TAL	NSV	DOV	CLT	TWS	RSD	MCH	DAY	NSV	POC	TAL	MCH	BRI	DAR	RCH	DOV	NWS	MAR	CLT	CAR	ATL	ONT	N/A	0	

===== Daytona 500 =====
Year	Team	Manufacturer	Start	Finish
1976	Bill Monaghan	Chevrolet	2	6
1977	Bill Monaghan	Chevrolet	34	18
1980	Bill Monaghan	Oldsmobile	DNQ	
