= 1976 Dixie 500 =

Auto race held at Atlanta International Raceway in 1976

Race details
- Race 29 of 30 in the 1976 NASCAR Winston Cup Series season
- Layout of Atlanta International Speedway, used until 1996
- Date: November 7, 1976
- Official name: Dixie 500
- Location: Atlanta International Raceway, Hampton, Georgia
- Course: Permanent racing facility
- Course length: 1.522 miles (2.449 km)
- Distance: 328 laps, 499.2 mi (803.3 km)
- Weather: Chilly with temperatures of 66.9 °F (19.4 °C); wind speeds of 15 miles per hour (24 km/h)
- Average speed: 127.396 miles per hour (205.024 km/h)
- Attendance: 46,000

Pole position
Driver	Buddy Baker	Bud Moore Engineering

Most laps led
Driver	Dave Marcis	K&K Insurance Racing
- Laps: 224

Winner
No. 71	Dave Marcis	K&K Insurance Racing

Television in the United States
- Network: CBS
- Announcers: Ken Squier

The 1976 Dixie 500 was a NASCAR Winston Cup Series race that took place on November 7, 1976, at Atlanta International Raceway in Hampton, Georgia, United States.

== Background ==
Atlanta International Raceway (now Atlanta Motor Speedway) is one of ten current intermediate tracks to hold NASCAR races. The layout at Atlanta International Speedway at the time was a four-turn traditional oval track that is 1.54 miles (2.48 km) long. The track's turns are banked at twenty-four degrees, while the front stretch, the location of the finish line, and the back stretch are banked at five.

== Race report ==
Three hundred and twenty eight laps were done on a paved oval track spanning 1.522 miles (2.449 km) for a grand total of 499.2 miles (803.4 km). The total time of the race was three hours and fifty-five minutes. Four cautions were made for forty-one laps. Dave Marcis defeated David Pearson by two car lengths.

In his third career start, Dale Earnhardt reached a career best finish to that point of his very young career in a 19th-place finish. Chevrolets filled out the majority of the racing grid.

Notable crew chiefs for this race included Travis Carter for Bobby Allison, Tim Brewer, Sterling Marlin for his dad Coo Coo Marlin, Dale Inman for Richard Petty, Harry Hyde for race-winner Marcis, Jake Elder, and Junie Donlavey. Speeds for this race were: 127.396 miles per hour (205.024 km/h) as the average and 161.652 miles per hour (260.154 km/h) for the pole position. Forty-six thousand fans attended this live race. Total winnings for this race were $132,625 ($750,378 when adjusted for inflation).

Canadian driver Jack Donohue would finish in last place without completing any laps after being swept into a big crash on the opening lap. he was granted 55 championship points just for qualifying.

The race was primarily a battle between Marcis, David Pearson, Yarborough, and Donnie Allison; for most of the first 62 laps in particular the top four raced nose to nose; Stock Car Racing Magazine writer Richard Benyo reported “the lead would change at four different spots” on the oval.

G.C. Spencer crashed on the first lap while Billy McGinnis blew his vehicle's engine on lap 15. A faulty head gasket forced David Sisco to leave the race on lap 34. Oil pressure issues would force Dick May out of the race on lap 60 while faulty wheel bearings eliminated Chuck Bown from the race on lap 75. Coo Coo Marlin had a bad engine on lap 114. Oil pressure issues forced Richard Petty to leave the race on lap 157, which ended his chance to overtake Yarborough for the Winston Cup title.

Frank Warren fell out with overheating by Lap 164 and Bobby Allison left on lap 168. Engine problems would claim the vehicles of Richard Childress on lap 218, Lennie Pond on lap 228, and Terry Bivins on lap 250. A problematic valve spring on lap 252 would end Richie Panch's weekend and Grant Adcox's engine would stop working on lap 254.

David Pearson looked like a winner on lap 301 as he drove by Marcis but after cooling his tires Marcus retook the lead for good from Pearson fourteen laps later. A late yellow set up a two-lap sprint and Marcis won it.

Richie Panch, son of Marvin Panch, would retire after the end of this race while Billy McGinnis would make his NASCAR Cup Series debut.

Dale Earnhardt survived a huge crash when Dick Brooks slid down the banking of Turn 3; Earnhardt hit Brooks and tumbled to Turn 4.

Future NASCAR star Bill Elliott had a role wiping the windshield of 16th-place finisher Gene Felton's stock car; Elliott would go on to have a successful Cup Series career of his own 12 years later.

=== Qualifying ===
Grid	No.	Driver	Manufacturer	Owner
1	15	Buddy Baker	Ford	Bud Moore
2	71	Dave Marcis	Dodge	Nord Krauskopf
3	21	David Pearson	Mercury	Wood Brothers
4	43	Richard Petty	Dodge	Petty Enterprises
5	1	Donnie Allison	Chevrolet	Hoss Ellington
6	27	Sam Sommers	Chevrolet	M.C. Anderson
7	11	Cale Yarborough	Chevrolet	Junior Johnson
8	2	Bobby Allison	Mercury	Roger Penske
9	88	Darrell Waltrip	Chevrolet	DiGard Racing
10	01	Chuck Bown	Chevrolet	Gerald Craker

== Finishing order ==
Section reference:

1. Dave Marcis
2. David Pearson†
3. Donnie Allison
4. Cale Yarborough†
5. Buddy Baker†
6. Benny Parsons†
7. Darrell Waltrip
8. Neil Bonnett†
9. Sam Sommers
10. Bobby Wawak†
11. Bruce Hill†
12. James Hylton†
13. J.D. McDuffie†
14. Skip Manning
15. Sonny Easley†
16. Gene Felton†
17. Jimmy Means
18. D.K. Ulrich
19. Dale Earnhardt*†
20. Grant Adcox*†
21. Richie Panch*†
22. Terry Bivins*
23. Cecil Gordon†
24. Lennie Pond*†
25. Richard Childress*
26. Bobby Allison*†
27. Frank Warren*†
28. Richard Petty*
29. Dick Brooks*†
30. Coo Coo Marlin*†
31. Chuck Bown*
32. Dick May*†
33. David Sisco*†
34. Billy McGinnis*
35. G.C. Spencer*†
36. Jack Donohue*

† signifies that the driver is known to be deceased
* Driver failed to finish race

== Standings after the race ==
Pos	Driver	Points	Differential
1	Cale Yarborough	4545	0
2	Richard Petty	4362	-183
3	Benny Parsons	4139	-406
4	Bobby Allison	4033	-512
5 ▲	Dave Marcis	3784	-761
6 ▼	Lennie Pond	3760	-785
7	Buddy Baker	3699	-846
8	Darrell Waltrip	3462	-1083
9	Richard Childress	3373	-1172
10 ▲	David Pearson	3298	-1247

Preceded by 1976 American 500	NASCAR Winston Cup Series Season; 1976	Succeeded by 1976 Los Angeles Times 500
