= 1976 American 500 =

Auto race held at Rockingham Speedway in 1978

Race details
- Race 28 of 30 in the 1976 NASCAR Winston Cup Series season
- Layout of Rockingham Speedway
- Date: October 24, 1976
- Official name: American 500
- Location: North Carolina Motor Speedway, Rockingham, North Carolina
- Course: Permanent racing facility
- Course length: 1.636 km (1.017 miles)
- Distance: 492 laps, 500 mi (804 km)
- Weather: Mild with temperatures of 72 °F (22 °C); wind speeds of 4.9 miles per hour (7.9 km/h)
- Average speed: 117.718 miles per hour (189.449 km/h)
- Attendance: 32,500

Pole position
Driver	David Pearson	Wood Brothers

Most laps led
Driver	Richard Petty	Petty Enterprises
- Laps: 193

Winner
No. 43	Richard Petty	Petty Enterprises

Television in the United States
- Network: untelevised
- Announcers: none

The 1976 American 500 was the 28th official race (out of 30) in the NASCAR Winston Cup Series season.

== Race report ==
This race took place on October 24, 1976, at North Carolina Motor Speedway in Rockingham, North Carolina. The race took four hours, fifteen minutes, and one second. Six cautions slowed the race for 35 laps.

Richard Petty would end up lapping the field as he scored the season sweep at Rockingham. Thirty-two thousand and five hundred spectators attended this event. David Pearson gained the pole position qualifying at a speed of 139.117 miles per hour (223.887 km/h) but eventually finished in sixth place. Henley Gray was the last-place finisher due to an engine issue on the first lap.

Notable crew chiefs in the race were Junie Donlavey, Jake Elder, Harry Hyde, Dale Inman, Bud Moore, Tim Brewer among others.

Richard Petty's teenage son Kyle would attend his father's victory celebrations; getting ready for his NASCAR career. The average speed of the race was 117.718 miles per hour (189.449 km/h). Jack Donohue was the only Canadian competitor out of the 36-car grid.

=== Qualifying ===
Grid	No.	Driver	Manufacturer
1	21	David Pearson	Mercury
2	71	Dave Marcis	Dodge
3	15	Buddy Baker	Ford
4	43	Richard Petty	Dodge
5	1	Donnie Allison	Chevrolet
6	67	Buddy Arrington	Chevrolet
7	2	Bobby Allison	Mercury
8	88	Darrell Waltrip	Chevrolet
9	11	Cale Yarborough	Chevrolet
10	40	D.K. Ulrich	Chevrolet
11	54	Lennie Pond	Chevrolet
12	90	Dick Brooks	Ford
13	60	Jackie Rogers	Chevrolet
14	36	Bobby Wawak	Chevrolet
15	92	Skip Manning	Chevrolet
16	3	Richard Childress	Chevrolet
17	67	Buddy Arrington	Dodge
18	55	Sonny Easley	Ford
19	49	Henley Gray	Dodge
20	5	James Hylton	Dodge
21	41	Grant Adcox	Chevrolet
22	14	Coo Coo Marlin	Chevrolet
23	24	Cecil Gordon	Chevrolet
24	05	David Sisco	Chevrolet
25	30	Terry Bivins	Chevrolet

== Finishing order ==
Section reference:

1. Richard Petty
2. Lennie Pond
3. Darrell Waltrip
4. Bobby Allison
5. Cale Yarborough
6. David Pearson
7. Donnie Allison
8. Dick Brooks
9. Skip Manning
10. Coo Coo Marlin
11. Sonny Easley
12. Grant Adcox
13. Ed Negre
14. D.K. Ulrich
15. Cecil Gordon
16. Buddy Arrington
17. Terry Bivins
18. Rick Newsom
19. Jackie Rogers
20. David Sisco
21. Jack Donohue
22. Frank Warren
23. Jimmy Means
24. Tommy Gale
25. Dave Marcis
26. J.D. McDuffie
27. Richard Childress
28. Buddy Baker
29. James Hylton
30. Dick May
31. Benny Parsons
32. Travis Tiller
33. Bobby Wawak
34. Gary Myers
35. Bruce Hill
36. Henley Gray

== Timeline ==
Section reference:

- Start: David Pearson was leading the racing grid as the first official lap commenced.
- Lap 2: Bruce Hill blew his engine while driving at high speeds.
- Lap 5: Gary Myers blew his engine while driving at high speeds.
- Lap 32: Dave Marcis took over the lead from David Pearson.
- Lap 76: Bobby Wawak managed to overheat his vehicle.
- Lap 85: Lennie Pond took over the lead from Dave Marcis.
- Lap 88: Travis Tiller blew his engine while driving at high speeds.
- Lap 96: Dave Marcis took over the lead from Lennie Pond.
- Lap 117: Benny Parsons blew his engine while driving at high speeds.
- Lap 127: Dick May blew his engine while driving at high speeds.
- Lap 171: The rear end of James Hylton's vehicle came off in an unsafe manner.
- Lap 180: Lennie Pond took over the lead from Dave Marcis.
- Lap 191: Dave Marcis took over the lead from Lennie Pond.
- Lap 208: Lennie Pond took over the lead from Dave Marcis.
- Lap 216: Donnie Allison took over the lead from Lennie Pond.
- Lap 217: Lennie Pond took over the lead from Donnie Allison.
- Lap 227: Richard Petty took over the lead from Lennie Pond.
- Lap 264: Lennie Pond took over the lead from Richard Petty.
- Lap 299: The throttle on Buddy Baker's vehicle was acting badly enough to knock him out of the race.
- Lap 322: Richard Petty took over the lead from Lennie Pond.
- Lap 324: Lennie Pond took over the lead from Richard Petty.
- Lap 329: Richard Petty took over the lead from Lennie Pond.
- Lap 363: Richard Childress blew his engine while driving at high speeds.
- Lap 389: J.D. McDuffie blew his engine while driving at high speeds.
- Lap 413: Lennie Pond took over the lead from Richard Petty, Dave Marcis blew his engine while driving at high speeds.
- Lap 423: Richard Petty took over the lead from Lennie Pond.
- Lap 486: Donnie Allison's fuel pump was beginning to cause problems for him.
- Finish: Richard Petty was officially declared the winner of the event.

== Standings after the race ==
Pos	Driver	Points	Differential
1	Cale Yarborough	4380	0
2	Richard Petty	4283	-97
3	Benny Parsons	3984	-396
4	Bobby Allison	3948	-432
5 ▲	Lennie Pond	3669	-711
6 ▼	Dave Marcis	3599	-781
7	Buddy Baker	3539	-841
8 ▲	Darrell Waltrip	3316	-1064
9 ▼	Richard Childress	3285	-1095
10	Dick Brooks	3211	-1169

Preceded by 1976 National 500	NASCAR Winston Cup Series Season; 1976	Succeeded by 1976 Dixie 500

Preceded by 1975	American 500 races 1976	Succeeded by 1977
