= 1977 Music City USA 420 =

Auto race held at Fairgrounds Speedway in 1977

Race details
- Race 11 of 30 in the 1977 NASCAR Winston Cup Series season
- Date: May 7, 1977
- Official name: Music City USA 420
- Location: Nashville Speedway, Nashville, Tennessee
- Course: Permanent racing facility
- Course length: 0.596 miles (0.959 km)
- Distance: 420 laps, 250.3 mi (402.8 km)
- Weather: Hot with temperatures of 86 °F (30 °C); wind speeds of 15 miles per hour (24 km/h)
- Average speed: 87.490 miles per hour (140.802 km/h)

Pole position
| Driver | Darrell Waltrip | DiGard Motorsports |

Most laps led
| Driver | Cale Yarborough | Junior Johnson & Associates |
- Laps: 398

Winner
| No. 72 | Benny Parsons | DeWitt Racing |

Television in the United States
- Network: untelevised
- Announcers: none

The 1977 Music City USA 420 was a 420-lap race that took place on May 7, 1977, at Fairgrounds Speedway in Nashville, Tennessee.

== Background ==
Nashville Speedway was converted to a half-mile paved oval in 1957, when it began to be a NASCAR series track. The speedway was lengthened between the 1969 and 1970 seasons. The corners were cut down from 35 degrees to their present 18 degrees in 1972.

== Race report ==
The race itself took two hours, fifty-one minutes, and forty seconds from the first green flag to the checkered flag. Benny Parsons was the race winner with an average speed of 87.49 miles per hour (140.80 km/h), while the pole position winner Darrell Waltrip had a speed of 103.643 miles per hour (166.797 km/h) and finished the race in 3rd place. Cale Yarborough led the race with most number of laps (275) and was the points leader after the race for the NASCAR Winston Cup Series championship. However, Benny Parsons would defeat him by one second.

Ricky Rudd made his fourth 4th career top-10 finish at this race.

Twenty thousand people attended this race that had a total prize purse of $56,350 ($299,388.39 in current US dollars). The winner would leave the event earning $9,565 ($50,818.99 in current US dollars) while the last-place finisher would walk away with $255 in cash earnings ($1,354.82 in current US dollars).

Other notable names among the drivers included Ricky Rudd, Coo Coo Marlin, Richard Petty, Elmo Langley, and Richard Childress. Notable crew chiefs included Buddy Parrott, Jake Elder, Joey Arrington, Kirk Shelmerdine, and Dale Inman.

Paul Dean Holt would retire from NASCAR after this race after competing in 85 races, while Ralph Jones would make his introduction into NASCAR racing during this race.

=== Qualifying ===
| Grid | No. | Driver | Manufacturer |
|---|---|---|---|
| 1 | 88 | Darrell Waltrip | Chevrolet |
| 2 | 72 | Benny Parsons | Chevrolet |
| 3 | 11 | Cale Yarborough | Chevrolet |
| 4 | 43 | Richard Petty | Dodge |
| 5 | 12 | Bobby Allison | AMC Matador |
| 6 | 2 | Dave Marcis | Chevrolet |
| 7 | 15 | Buddy Baker | Ford |
| 8 | 52 | Jimmy Means | Chevrolet |
| 9 | 92 | Skip Manning | Chevrolet |
| 10 | 3 | Richard Childress | Chevrolet |
| 11 | 70 | J.D. McDuffie | Chevrolet |
| 12 | 22 | Ricky Rudd | Chevrolet |
| 13 | 81 | Terry Ryan | Chevrolet |
| 14 | 67 | Buddy Arrington | Dodge |
| 15 | 14 | Coo Coo Marlin | Chevrolet |

== Finishing order ==
Section reference:

1. Benny Parsons (No. 72)
2. Cale Yarborough (No. 11)
3. Darrell Waltrip (No. 88)
4. Dave Marcis (No. 2)
5. Richard Petty (No. 43)
6. Buddy Baker (No. 15)
7. Bobby Allison (No. 12)
8. Coo Coo Marlin (No. 14)
9. Jimmy Means (No. 52)
10. Ricky Rudd (No. 22)
11. James Hylton (No. 48)
12. Gary Myers (No. 4)
13. Cecil Gordon (No. 24)
14. D.K. Ulrich (No. 40)
15. Buddy Arrington (No. 67)
16. Rick Newsom (No. 20)
17. Earl Brooks (No. 33)
18. Ralph Jones (No. 98)
19. David Sisco (No. 16)
20. Ferrell Harris (No. 25)
21. Skip Manning* (No. 96)
22. Dick Brooks* (No. 64)
23. Elmo Langley* (No. 45)
24. J.D. McDuffie* (No. 70)
25. Henley Gray* (No. 19)
26. Richard Childress* (No. 3)
27. Terry Ryan* (No. 81)
28. Paul Dean Holt* (No. 39)
29. Frank Warren* (No. 79)
30. Dean Dalton* (No. 7)

* Driver failed to finish race

== Timeline ==
Section reference:

- Start: Darrell Waltrip was leading the racing grid as the green flag was waved.
- Lap 3: Benny Parsons took over the lead from Darrell Waltrip.
- Lap 19: Dean Dalton fell out with engine failure.
- Lap 30: Frank Warren fell out with engine failure.
- Lap 47: Paul Dean Holt managed to overheat his vehicle.
- Lap 86: Terry Ryan fell out with engine failure.
- Lap 108: Cale Yarborough took over the lead from Benny Parsons.
- Lap 133: Richard Childress fell out with engine failure.
- Lap 154: Henley Gray managed to overheat his vehicle.
- Lap 176: J.D. McDuffie fell out with engine failure.
- Lap 182: Elmo Langley fell out with engine failure.
- Lap 269: The ignition on Dick Brooks' vehicle stopped working properly.
- Lap 313: The rear end of Skip Manning's vehicle came off in a manner that was unsafe for further racing.
- Lap 383: Benny Parsons took over the lead from Cale Yarborough.
- Finish: Benny Parsons was officially declared the winner of the event.

== Standings after the race ==
| Pos | Driver | Points | Differential |
|---|---|---|---|
| 1 | Cale Yarborough | 1905 | 0 |
| 2 | Richard Petty | 1713 | -192 |
| 3 ▲ | Benny Parsons | 1677 | -228 |
| 4 ▼ | Darrell Waltrip | 1672 | -223 |
| 5 ▲ | Dave Marcis | 1460 | -445 |
| 6 ▼ | Buddy Baker | 1452 | -453 |
| 7 ▲ | Cecil Gordon | 1341 | -564 |
| 8 ▼ | Richard Childress | 1321 | -584 |
| 9 ▲ | James Hylton | 1286 | -619 |
| 10 ▼ | Dick Brooks | 1284 | -621 |

| Preceded by 1977 Winston 500 | NASCAR Winston Cup Series Season; 1977 | Succeeded by 1977 Mason-Dixon 500 |

| Preceded by 1976 | Music City USA races 1977 | Succeeded by 1978 |
