= 1976 Southern 500 =

Auto race held at Darlington Raceway in 1976

Race details
- Race 22 of 30 in the 1976 NASCAR Winston Cup Series season
- 1976 Southern 500 program cover
- Date: September 5, 1976
- Official name: Southern 500
- Location: Darlington Raceway, Darlington, South Carolina
- Course: Permanent racing facility
- Course length: 1.375 miles (2.212 km)
- Distance: 367 laps, 500.5 mi (805.4 km)
- Weather: Very hot with temperatures of 84.9 °F (29.4 °C); wind speeds of 7 miles per hour (11 km/h)
- Average speed: 120.534 miles per hour (193.981 km/h)

Pole position
Driver	David Pearson	Wood Brothers Racing

Most laps led
Driver	David Pearson	Wood Brothers Racing
- Laps: 93

Winner
No. 21	David Pearson	Wood Brothers Racing

Television in the United States
- Network: ABC
- Announcers: Keith Jackson; Chris Economaki

The 1976 Southern 500 was a NASCAR Winston Cup Series racing event that took place on September 5, 1976, at Darlington Raceway in Darlington, South Carolina.

The five drivers that dominated the 1976, NASCAR Winston Cup Series season were David Pearson (average finish of 7th place), Cale Yarborough (average finish of 8th place), Richard Petty (average finish of 9th place), Benny Parsons (average finish of 10th place), and Bobby Allison (average finish 12th place).

Jimmy Carter, who had at one time been a ticket taker at the Atlanta Motor Speedway and was later the Governor of Georgia and who would be elected president in November, visited this race as part of his ultimately successful presidential campaign.

== Race report ==
Darlington Raceway, nicknamed by many NASCAR fans and drivers as "The Lady in Black" or "The Track Too Tough to Tame" and advertised as a "NASCAR Tradition", is a race track built for NASCAR racing located near Darlington, South Carolina. It is of a unique, somewhat egg-shaped design, an oval with the ends of very different configurations, a condition which supposedly arose from the proximity of one end of the track to a minnow pond the owner refused to relocate. This situation makes it very challenging for the crews to set up their cars' handling in a way that will be effective at both ends.

The track is a four-turn 1.366 miles (2.198 km) oval. The track's first two turns are banked at twenty-five degrees, while the final two turns are banked two degrees lower at twenty-three degrees. The front stretch (the location of the finish line) and the back stretch is banked at six degrees. Darlington Raceway can seat up to 60,000 people.

Darlington has something of a legendary quality among drivers and older fans; this is probably due to its long track length relative to other NASCAR speedways of its era and hence the first venue where many of them became cognizant of the truly high speeds that stock cars could achieve on a long track. The track allegedly earned the moniker The Lady in Black because the night before the race the track maintenance crew would cover the entire track with fresh asphalt sealant, in the early years of the speedway, thus making the racing surface dark black. Darlington is also known as "The Track Too Tough to Tame" because drivers can run lap after lap without a problem and then bounce off of the wall the following lap. Racers will frequently explain that they have to race the racetrack, not their competition. Drivers hitting the wall are considered to have received their "Darlington Stripe" thanks to the missing paint on the right side of the car.

== Summary ==
The race took four hours and nine minutes for David Pearson to defeat Richard Petty by nearly three seconds. Pearson ended a career slump in the Southern 500, taking the ninth win of his successful 1976 season, his first Southern 500 after six wins in the Rebel 500. This would be the 60th time in their careers Pearson and Petty finished 1–2 in a Winston Cup Grand National race (the duo would finish 1–2 three more times in their careers with Pearson holding a 33–30 edge).

Darrell Bryant's vehicle suffered engine problems on lap 3 while David Sisco crashed on lap 13. Rick Newsom had ignition issues on lap 44. Bruce Jacobi's engine failed on lap 59.

A scary accident took place around lap 172 when Skip Manning spun. He spun down the track, right into the path of Frasson who T-boned him. Aside from Manning having his foot trapped in the car until rescuers could get him out, he was relatively ok. Buddy Baker did the same thing on lap 181. Engine failures ended the race on lap 210 for Earle Canavan, lap 213 for Dick May, lap 216 for Gary Myers, lap 238 for Ed Negre, and lap 272 for J.D. McDuffie. Problems with the vehicle's suspension relegated Neil Bonnett to the sidelines on lap 290.

Bruce Hill's engine stopped working on lap 321; making him the final DNF of the race and forcing him to a 22nd-place finish.

This would give Pearson a win in three of the four "crown jewel" events of 1976; the Daytona 500, the 1976 Winston 500, the World 600, and this race. Souvenir programs were handed out at the race for only $2 ($11.32 when adjusted for inflation).

There were eight cautions for 65 laps in front of 70000 people. There were 31 lead changes and an average speed of 120.534 miles per hour (193.981 km/h). Forty drivers were on the starting grid; all the drivers were born in the United States. Most of the drivers in the race drove Chevrolet vehicles. There were only three Ford entries and two entries of Mercury automobiles.

The entire purse was $169,700 ($960,100 when adjusted for inflation). Pearson would receive $16,155 ($91,403 when adjusted for inflation) while last-place finisher Darrell Bryant would receive $1,135 of the total winnings ($6,422 when adjusted for inflation).

Notable crew chiefs in the race were Billy Hagan, Junie Donlavey, Jake Elder, Harry Hyde, Dale Inman, Bud Moore, Tim Brewer, and Travis Carter.

=== Qualifying ===
Grid	No.	Driver	Manufacturer	Owner
1	21	David Pearson	Mercury	Wood Brothers
2	2	Bobby Allison	Mercury	Roger Penske
3	15	Buddy Baker	Ford	Bud Moore
4	88	Darrell Waltrip	Chevrolet	DiGard
5	72	Benny Parsons	Chevrolet	L.G. DeWitt
6	71	Dave Marcis	Dodge	Dave Marcis
7	11	Cale Yarborough	Chevrolet	Junior Johnson
8	43	Richard Petty	Dodge	Petty Enterprises
9	90	Dick Brooks	Ford	Junie Donlavey
10	28	Donnie Allison	Chevrolet	Hoss Ellington

Failed to qualify: Ricky Rudd (#22).

== Top 10 finishers ==
Pos	Grid	No.	Driver	Manufacturer	Laps	Winnings	Laps led	Points	Time/Status
1	1	21	David Pearson	Ford	367	$16,155	93	185	4:09:33
2	8	43	Richard Petty	Dodge	367	$18,055	32	175	+2.8 seconds
3	4	88	Darrell Waltrip	Chevrolet	367	$13,135	50	170	Lead lap under green flag
4	6	71	Dave Marcis	Dodge	367	$10,800	58	165	Lead lap under green flag
5	14	54	Lennie Pond	Chevrolet	365	$8,315	1	160	+2 laps
6	9	90	Dick Brooks	Ford	364	$6,935	0	150	+3 laps
7	5	72	Benny Parsons	Chevrolet	364	$7,525	3	151	+3 laps
8	11	14	Coo Coo Marlin	Chevrolet	356	$5,915	0	142	+11 laps
9	2	2	Bobby Allison	Mercury	355	$6,905	28	143	+12 laps
10	22	36	Bobby Wawak	Chevrolet	355	$3,245	0	134	+12 laps

== Standings after the race ==
Pos	Driver	Points	Differential
1	Cale Yarborough	3310	0
2 ▲	Richard Petty	3281	-29
3 ▼	Benny Parsons	3263	-47
4	Bobby Allison	3125	-185
5	Dave Marcis	2914	-396
6	Lennie Pond	2901	-409
7	Richard Childress	2666	-644
8	Buddy Baker	2650	-660
9 ▲	David Pearson	2537	-773
10 ▲	Darrell Waltrip	2510	-800

Preceded by 1976 Volunteer 400	NASCAR Winston Cup Season; 1976	Succeeded by 1976 Capital City 400
Preceded by 1975	Southern 500 races 1976	Succeeded by 1977
