= Stock Car Racing (magazine) =

Auto racing magazine

- Categories: Auto racing
- Publisher: Source Interlink Media
- First issue: May 1966
- Final issue: 2008
- Country: United States
- Based in: Concord, North Carolina
- Language: English
- Website: www.stockcarracing.com

Stock Car Racing (SCR) was founded in the United States in May 1966 The magazine is based in Concord, North Carolina.

The monthly magazine ceased publication in 2008. As of April 2009, the website was still active.

== History ==
Stock Car Racing was launched in May 1966. At the time, Jim Davis was publishing a drag racing magazine called Super Stock, so with the existing production staff, the printer, and the distribution network already in place, Jim Davis was planning to add a second magazine to his business.

It was Dick Williford who suggested that Davis start a magazine on stock car racing, because no other magazine had devoted full coverage to stock cars. Jim Davis recalled, "Speed Sport News was about it.... Some of the general automotive magazines like Motor Trend would have occasional articles about stock car racing...". However, there was no magazine, at the time, devoted exclusively to stock car racing.

So Jim Davis and business associate John "Monk" Reynolds, following the suggestion from Dick Williford, began Stock Car Racing in May 1966. The first issue, on the cover, showed a picture with defending NASCAR champion Ned Jarrett and another cover photo of racer Curtis Turner (1924–1970).

The magazine had limited success in the first years. Jim Davis noted, "It was extremely difficult, because NASCAR didn't want anything to do with us. They didn't like the idea of outsiders coming in and, in their opinion, making a profit off of their shows." Jim Davis met with NASCAR officials to arrange an agreement; he noted, "Monk and I called NASCAR and asked for a meeting so we could explain to them what we were going to do. They eventually had Monk and me down there [to Daytona], essentially to have a meeting about what we were doing." Regardless, NASCAR was still not very receptive to the idea of a publication covering the sport, and Davis said that the press credentials were sometimes difficult to obtain because of that mindset.

The magazine persevered, however, by the tactics of staffing the big NASCAR races with an on-site photographer and publishing the related stories as written by local newspaper writers.

Davis and Reynolds began publishing the magazine in Alexandria, Virginia, and they eventually implored Dick Williford to come and help to keep the magazine in publication. Jim Davis, while covering drag racing with SuperStock, had become acquainted with Williford from seeing him at various drag racing events over the years. Williford was employed as a PR rep for Chrysler and had turned to drag racing (along with Richard Petty) when Chrysler pulled out of NASCAR in 1965.

Williford, who had first suggested that David create a stock car publication, was vital in getting the early issues of Stock Car Racing to press. He did much of the writing and legwork necessary to publish the magazine. "There is no way the magazine would have gotten off the ground without him," Jim Davis recalled. "He [Williford] set up all the contacts with the stringers we used at all the major NASCAR superspeedways. Monk and I didn't know any of those people and knew almost nothing about NASCAR racing."

Three years later, in 1969, Jim Davis sold his interest in both magazines, Stock Car Racing and Super Stock, to John Reynolds. Davis then started an advertising agency there in Alexandria, VA. After five years in the agency business, Davis moved to California and served as president of B&M Racing & Performance for 18 years. Then two years as president of Russell Performance Products By 1995, Davis, living in Westchester, California, co-founded Professional Products, working as the chief operating officer.

In January 2012, Davis retired from Professional Products but retained an ownership position in the company. He launched an internet business called Performance Injection selling a line of performance auto parts. Davis still works as a consultant to Professional Products and now resides in Melbourne, Florida.

John Reynolds eventually sold both magazines to Lopez Publications. Since then, several other companies have owned Stock Car Racing, including Primedia (now Rent Group).
