= 1977 Champion Spark Plug 400 =

Auto race held at Michigan International Speedway in 1977

Race details
- Race 20 of 30 in the 1977 NASCAR Winston Cup Series season
- 1977 Champion Spark Plug 400 program cover
- Date: August 22, 1977
- Official name: Champion Spark Plug 400
- Location: Michigan International Speedway, Brooklyn, Michigan
- Course: Permanent racing facility
- Course length: 3.218 km (2.000 miles)
- Distance: 200 laps, 400 mi (643 km)
- Weather: Mild with temperatures of 78.1 °F (25.6 °C); wind speeds up to 14 miles per hour (23 km/h)
- Average speed: 137.944 miles per hour (221.999 km/h)
- Attendance: 35,000

Pole position
| Driver | David Pearson | Wood Brothers Racing |

Most laps led
| Driver | Cale Yarborough | Junior Johnson & Associates |
- Laps: 120

Winner
| No. 88 | Darrell Waltrip | DiGard Motorsports |

Television in the United States
- Network: untelevised
- Announcers: none

The 1977 Champion Spark Plug 400 was a NASCAR Winston Cup Series racing event that took place on August 22, 1977, at Michigan International Speedway in Brooklyn, Michigan.

== Background ==
Michigan International Speedway is a four-turn superspeedway that is 2 miles (3.2 km) long. Opened in 1968, the track's turns are banked at eighteen degrees, while the 3,600-foot-long front stretch, the location of the finish line, is banked at twelve degrees. The back stretch, has a five degree banking and is 2,242 feet long.

== Race report ==
There were 36 drivers on the racing grid; all of them were born in the United States. While Cale Yarborough and Darrell Waltrip would duel for the lead during the opening laps of this racing event, Waltrip would battle against Benny Parsons for supremacy during the closing laps. Waltrip defeated David Pearson by two car lengths in front of an audience of 35,000. Waltrip's crew chief for this race was Buddy Parrott.

Janet Guthrie was the only female in this race; scoring the first of 5 career top-10 finishes and proving that women could perform well in races instead of just being the wife of a race car driver. Earle Canavan would finish last due to an engine issue on the first lap. Most of the DNFs in this race would be due to engine issues. The lowest finishing driver running at the end was Dave Marcis. Only six drivers would end the race on the lead lap; with Yarborough being the lowest driver on the lead lap. After this race, Cale Yarborough and Richard Petty would be within 50 points of each other; both gunning for a championship.

Sam Sommers was in the running for Rookie of the Year in 1977. He actually got a pole that year and some decent finishes. For reasons unknown after 1977, he only made two more starts in NASCAR in 1978, and completely disappeared.

The purse for this race was $108,825 ($564,683 when adjusted for inflation); Waltrip brought home $16,820 ($87,277 when adjusted for inflation) while Canavan earned $600 ($3,113 when adjusted for inflation). Terry Ryan would retire from NASCAR Cup Series racing after this event, finishing in 9th place.

=== Qualifying ===
| Grid | No. | Driver | Manufacturer | Owner |
|---|---|---|---|---|
| 1 | 21 | David Pearson | Mercury | Wood Brothers |
| 2 | 11 | Cale Yarborough | Chevrolet | Junior Johnson |
| 3 | 88 | Darrell Waltrip | Chevrolet | DiGard Racing |
| 4 | 72 | Benny Parsons | Chevrolet | L.G. DeWitt |
| 5 | 15 | Buddy Baker | Ford | Bud Moore |
| 6 | 43 | Richard Petty | Dodge | Petty Enterprises |
| 7 | 27 | Sam Sommers | Chevrolet | M.C. Anderson |
| 8 | 2 | Dave Marcis | Chevrolet | Roger Penske |
| 9 | 92 | Skip Manning | Chevrolet | Billy Hagan |
| 10 | 22 | Ricky Rudd | Chevrolet | Al Rudd |
| 11 | 47 | Bruce Hill | Chevrolet | Bruce Hill |
| 12 | 81 | Terry Ryan | Chevrolet | Bill Monaghan |
| 13 | 90 | Dick Brooks | Ford | Junie Donlavey |
| 14 | 67 | Buddy Arrington | Dodge | Buddy Arrington |
| 15 | 68 | Janet Guthrie | Chevrolet | Lynda Ferreri |
| 16 | 75 | Butch Hartman | Chevrolet | Butch Hartman |
| 17 | 12 | Bobby Allison | Matador | Bobby Allison |
| 18 | 9 | Bill Elliott | Mercury | George Elliott |
| 19 | 8 | Ed Negre | Dodge | Ed Negre |
| 20 | 70 | J.D. McDuffie | Chevrolet | J.D. McDuffie |

== Finishing order ==
| POS | ST | # | DRIVER | SPONSOR / OWNER | CAR | LAPS | MONEY | STATUS | LED | PTS |
|---|---|---|---|---|---|---|---|---|---|---|
| 1 | 3 | 88 | Darrell Waltrip | Gatorade (DiGard Racing) | Chevrolet | 200 | 16820 | running | 51 | 180 |
| 2 | 1 | 21 | David Pearson | Purolator (Wood Brothers) | Mercury | 200 | 10300 | running | 4 | 175 |
| 3 | 4 | 72 | Benny Parsons | 1st National City Travelers Checks (L.G. DeWitt) | Chevrolet | 200 | 9350 | running | 22 | 170 |
| 4 | 7 | 27 | Sam Sommers | M.C. Anderson | Chevrolet | 200 | 4900 | running | 1 | 165 |
| 5 | 2 | 11 | Cale Yarborough | Holly Farms (Junior Johnson) | Chevrolet | 200 | 8100 | running | 120 | 165 |
| 6 | 13 | 90 | Dick Brooks | Truxmore (Junie Donlavey) | Ford | 200 | 4750 | running | 0 | 150 |
| 7 | 10 | 22 | Ricky Rudd | Al Rudd Auto Parts (Al Rudd) | Chevrolet | 199 | 2000 | running | 0 | 146 |
| 8 | 6 | 43 | Richard Petty | STP (Petty Enterprises) | Dodge | 198 | 5100 | running | 2 | 147 |
| 9 | 12 | 81 | Terry Ryan | Valvoline (Bill Monaghan) | Chevrolet | 197 | 1800 | running | 0 | 138 |
| 10 | 15 | 68 | Janet Guthrie | Kelly Girl (Lynda Ferreri) | Chevrolet | 196 | 1700 | running | 0 | 134 |
| 11 | 27 | 30 | Tighe Scott | Scotty's Fashions (Walter Ballard) | Chevrolet | 196 | 3950 | running | 0 | 130 |
| 12 | 9 | 92 | Skip Manning | 1st National City Travelers Checks (Billy Hagan) | Chevrolet | 196 | 4530 | running | 0 | 127 |
| 13 | 11 | 47 | Bruce Hill | Bruce Hill | Chevrolet | 196 | 1250 | running | 0 | |
| 14 | 14 | 67 | Buddy Arrington | Mistec Transmission (Buddy Arrington) | Dodge | 195 | 3095 | running | 0 | 121 |
| 15 | 32 | 74 | Bobby Wawak | Bobby Wawak | Chevrolet | 195 | 1080 | running | 0 | |
| 16 | 24 | 48 | James Hylton | Hylton Engineering (James Hylton) | Chevrolet | 192 | 2810 | running | 0 | 115 |
| 17 | 31 | 52 | Jimmy Means | WIXC (Bill Gray) | Chevrolet | 192 | 2165 | running | 0 | 112 |
| 18 | 26 | 40 | D.K. Ulrich | J.R. DeLotto | Chevrolet | 189 | 2480 | running | 0 | 109 |
| 19 | 23 | 24 | Cecil Gordon | Transmissions Unlimited (Cecil Gordon) | Chevrolet | 189 | 2195 | running | 0 | 106 |
| 20 | 20 | 70 | J.D. McDuffie | Bailey Excavating (J.D. McDuffie) | Chevrolet | 186 | 1960 | running | 0 | 103 |
| 21 | 29 | 25 | Dean Dalton | Don Robertson | Chevrolet | 179 | 1775 | running | 0 | 100 |
| 22 | 8 | 2 | Dave Marcis | CAM 2 (Roger Penske) | Chevrolet | 154 | 1350 | running | 0 | |
| 23 | 25 | 79 | Frank Warren | Native Tan (Frank Warren) | Dodge | 141 | 1465 | engine | 0 | 94 |
| 24 | 28 | 61 | Joe Mihalic | Joe Mihalic | Chevrolet | 134 | 800 | wheel | 0 | 91 |
| 25 | 16 | 75 | Butch Hartman | Hartman Autocar (Butch Hartman) | Chevrolet | 125 | 775 | engine | 0 | 88 |
| 26 | 17 | 12 | Bobby Allison | 1st National City Travelers Checks (Bobby Allison) | Matador | 117 | 880 | engine | 0 | 85 |
| 27 | 35 | 63 | Jocko Maggiacomo | 1st National City Travelers Checks (Jocko Maggiacomo) | Matador | 114 | 725 | engine | 0 | |
| 28 | 33 | 91 | Harold Miller | Bartow Paving (Harold Miller) | Chevrolet | 85 | 700 | driveshaft | 0 | |
| 29 | 18 | 9 | Bill Elliott | Dahlonega Ford Sales (George Elliott) | Mercury | 76 | 685 | engine | 0 | |
| 30 | 5 | 15 | Buddy Baker | Norris Industries (Bud Moore) | Ford | 68 | 3865 | engine | 0 | 73 |
| 31 | 19 | 8 | Ed Negre | Ed Negre | Dodge | 61 | 1270 | engine | 0 | 70 |
| 32 | 30 | 64 | Tommy Gale | Sunny King Ford & Honda (Elmo Langley) | Ford | 53 | 1240 | running | 0 | 67 |
| 33 | 21 | 3 | Richard Childress | Kansas Jack (Richard Childress) | Chevrolet | 41 | 1130 | engine | 0 | 64 |
| 34 | 36 | 45 | Baxter Price | Baxter Price | Chevrolet | 5 | 620 | engine | 0 | 61 |
| 35 | 22 | 42 | Elmo Langley | Marty Robbins | Dodge | 1 | 610 | engine | 0 | 58 |
| 36 | 34 | 01 | Earle Canavan | Benihana (Earle Canavan) | Dodge | 1 | 600 | engine | 0 | |

== Timeline ==
Section reference:

- Lap 1: Cale Yarborough was officially leading the race as the green flag was waved.
- Lap 5: Baxter Price fell out with engine failure.
- Lap 41: Richard Childress fell out with engine failure.
- Lap 61: Ed Negre fell out with engine failure.
- Lap 68: Buddy Baker fell out with engine failure.
- Lap 76: Bill Elliott fell out with engine failure.
- Lap 85: Harold Miller's vehicle suffered from a problematic driveshaft.
- Lap 114: Jocko Maggiacomo fell out with engine failure.
- Lap 117: Bobby Allison fell out with engine failure.
- Lap 125: Butch Hartman fell out with engine failure.
- Lap 134: Joey Mihalic's wheel started acting funny.
- Lap 141: Frank Warren fell out with engine failure.
- Finish: Darrell Waltrip was officially declared the winner of the race.

== Standings after the race ==
| Pos | Driver | Points | Differential |
|---|---|---|---|
| 1 | Cale Yarborough | 3290 | 0 |
| 2 | Richard Petty | 3240 | -50 |
| 3 | Benny Parsons | 2989 | -301 |
| 4 | Darrell Waltrip | 2952 | -338 |
| 5 | Buddy Baker | 2656 | -634 |
| 6 | Dick Brooks | 2498 | -792 |
| 7 | Cecil Gordon | 2357 | -933 |
| 8 | Bobby Allison | 2266 | -1024 |
| 9 ▲ | James Hylton | 2219 | -1071 |
| 10 ▼ | Richard Childress | 2217 | -1073 |

| Preceded by 1977 Talladega 500 | NASCAR Winston Cup Series Season; 1977 | Succeeded by 1977 Volunteer 400 |

| Preceded by 1976 | Champion Spark Plug 400 races 1977 | Succeeded by 1978 |
