= 1977 Winston 500 =

Auto race held at Talladega Superspeedway in 1977

Race details
- Race 10 of 30 in the 1977 NASCAR Winston Cup Series season
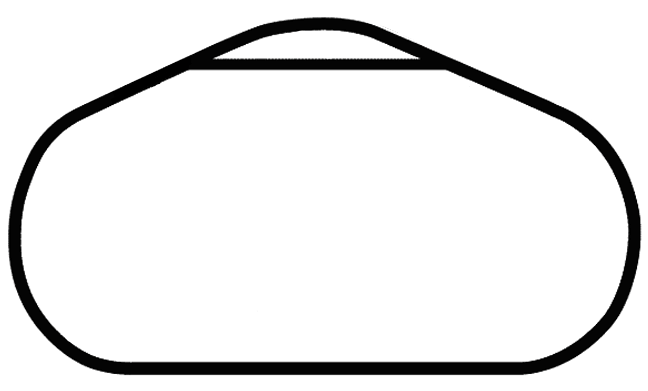
- Layout of Talladega Superspeedway
- Date: May 1, 1977
- Official name: Winston 500
- Location: Alabama International Motor Speedway, Talladega, Alabama
- Course: Permanent racing facility
- Course length: 4.280 km (2.660 miles)
- Distance: 188 laps, 500.1 mi (804.8 km)
- Weather: Very hot with temperatures of 84 °F (29 °C); wind speeds of 11.8 miles per hour (19.0 km/h)
- Average speed: 164.887 miles per hour (265.360 km/h)
- Attendance: 90,000

Pole position
Driver	A. J. Foyt	A.J. Foyt

Most laps led
Driver	Donnie Allison	Hoss Ellington
- Laps: 71

Winner
No. 88	Darrell Waltrip	DiGard Motorsports

Television in the United States
- Network: CBS
- Announcers: Ken Squier

The 1977 Winston 500 was a NASCAR Winston Cup Series race that took place on May 1, 1977, at Alabama International Motor Speedway (now Talladega Superspeedway) in Talladega, Alabama. The tenth of 30 races of the 1977 Winston Cup Grand National season, the Winston 500 started 41 cars.

The race's pole was won by A. J. Foyt, driving a Chevrolet Laguna. His pole speed was 192 miles per hour or 309 kilometres per hour. Benny Parsons qualified second while the race's defending champion Buddy Baker timed in 20th. Darrell Waltrip qualified 11th a month after a breakthrough win in the Rebel 500 at Darlington; it was the only time all season a Cup driver started outside the top-8 and ended up in victory lane.

== Background ==
Talladega Superspeedway, originally known as Alabama International Motor Superspeedway (AIMS), is a motorsports complex located north of Talladega, Alabama. It is located on the former Anniston Air Force Base in the small city of Lincoln. The track is a Tri-oval and was constructed by International Speedway Corporation, a business controlled by the France Family, in the 1960s. Talladega is most known for its steep banking and the unique location of the start/finish line - located just past the exit to pit road. The track currently hosts the NASCAR series such as the Sprint Cup Series, Xfinity Series, and the Camping World Truck Series. Talladega Superspeedway is the longest NASCAR oval with a length of 2.66 miles (4.28 km), and the track at its peak had a seating capacity of 175,000 spectators.

== Race report ==
The race lead changed 63 times among 11 drivers. Donnie Allison, driving a Chevrolet for Hoss Ellington, raced to the lead on the opening lap and would lead 71 laps total. Foyt fell out on Lap 18 when his engine blew and he spun through Turns Three and Four. Richard Petty, who passed seven cars on Lap Six to take the lead, fell out in the final 35 laps with engine failure, while Baker, who passed both Petty and Foyt for the lead on Lap Seven, fell out 90 laps in with engine failure.

Coming across the stripe at the white, Waltrip led with Allison in second, Yarborough third, Parsons fourth. In turn one, Waltrip broke the draft and drove to the bottom of the track, gaining a five or six car length advantage. The advantage disintegrated on the backstretch, as Allison showed his hand first, trying vainly to get by Waltrip but was trained by Yarborough who drove up the center and Parsons who rocketed on the inside. Yarborough swept up Allison's draft high and banged into Waltrip as he tried to beat him out of four but nearly lost it as he kept his foot in the throttle of his ill-handling car. When Yarborough slipped, Parsons took it and as they came through the trioval, Waltrip drove away from the battle for second as Parsons and Yarborough slammed into each other for second and Allison tried to steal it up high. It was Yarborough beating out Parsons by inches with Allison fourth and Waltrip taking the victory. The win was Waltrip's second of the 1977 season and second on a superspeedway; Darrell Waltrip's win here was the first of four points-paying victories for him at Talladega, all coming between 1977 and 1982.

Individual earnings for each driver varied from the winner's portion of $26,875 ($139,452 when adjusted for inflation) to the last-place finisher's portion of $1,705 ($8,847 when adjusted for inflation). A grand total of $211,405 for all the qualifying drivers ($1,096,961 when adjusted for inflation).

=== Top 10 finishers ===
Pos	Grid	No.	Driver	Manufacturer	Laps	Laps led	Points	Time/Status
1	11	88	Darrell Waltrip	Chevrolet	188	18	180	3:01:59
2	5	11	Cale Yarborough	Chevrolet	188	29	175	+0.29 seconds
3	2	72	Benny Parsons	Chevrolet	188	16	170	Lead lap under green flag
4	4	1	Donnie Allison	Chevrolet	188	71	170	Lead lap under green flag
5	6	2	Dave Marcis	Mercury	188	3	160	Lead lap under green flag
6	8	36	Ron Hutcherson	Chevrolet	187	0	150	+1 lap
7	19	90	Dick Brooks	Ford	187	0	146	+1 lap
8	17	14	Coo Coo Marlin	Chevrolet	186	0	142	+2 laps
9	32	80	Terry Bivins	Chevrolet	183	0	138	+5 laps
10	3	27	Sam Sommers	Chevrolet	183	0	134	+5 laps

== Standings after the race ==
Pos	Driver	Points	Differential
1	Cale Yarborough	1725	0
2	Richard Petty	1558	-167
3 ▲	Darrell Waltrip	1502	-223
4 ▼	Benny Parsons	1497	-228
5	Buddy Baker	1302	-423
6	Dave Marcis	1300	-425
7	Richard Childress	1236	-489
8	Cecil Gordon	1217	-508
9 ▲	Dick Brooks	1187	-538
10	James Hylton	1156	-569

Preceded by 1977 Virginia 500	NASCAR Winston Cup Series Season; 1977	Succeeded by 1977 Music City USA 420

Preceded by 1976 Winston 500	Talladega spring race 1977	Succeeded by 1978 Winston 500
