= 1976 National 500 =

Auto race run at Charlotte Motor Speedway in 1976

Race details
- Race 27 of 30 in the 1976 NASCAR Winston Cup Series season
- This is a souvenir magazine from the 1976 running of the National 500.
- Date: October 10, 1976
- Official name: National 500
- Location: Charlotte Motor Speedway, Concord, North Carolina
- Course: Permanent racing facility
- Course length: 1.500 miles (2.414 km)
- Distance: 334 laps, 500 mi (804 km)
- Weather: Temperatures of 64.9 °F (18.3 °C); wind speeds of 10.1 miles per hour (16.3 km/h)
- Average speed: 141.226 mph (227.281 km/h)

Pole position
Driver	David Pearson	Wood Brothers
- Time: 33.494 seconds

Most laps led
Driver	Buddy Baker	Bud Moore
- Laps: 104

Winner
No. 1	Donnie Allison	Hoss Ellington

Television in the United States
- Network: ABC
- Announcers: Chris Economaki

The 1976 National 500 was a NASCAR Winston Cup Series racing event that took place on October 10, 1976, at Charlotte Motor Speedway in Concord, North Carolina.

By 1980, NASCAR had completely stopped tracking the year model of all the vehicles and most teams did not take stock cars to the track under their own power anymore.

== Race report ==
A souvenir program was offered to the spectators at a cost of $3 USD per copy ($16.97 when adjusted for inflation). Another race took place the previous day known as the World Service Life 300; a companion race that accompanied the National 500 during the course of the 1970s.

The race was held on a dry circuit; with no precipitation recorded around the speedway.

Forty American-born drivers competed at this race; the winner received $22,435 out of the total prize purse ($126,935 when adjusted for inflation). Last-place finisher Al Holbert received only $855 for his engine problem of lap 7 out of the scheduled 334 laps of the race ($4,838 in when adjusted for inflation). Janet Guthrie was the only female competitor in this three-hour-and-thirty-two-minute race. After three cautions for eighteen laps and 26 lead changes, Donnie Allison defeated Cale Yarborough in front of 74500 other people. Had Cale Yarborough won the race, he would have won five consecutive races. A.J. Foyt quit the Hoss Ellington team in the early stages of the race, telling reporters he'd rather build his own cars than drive cars that are "never prepared." The frustrated Foyt quipped that he "couldn't keep that car in a 10 acre bryar patch." Donnie Allison won the race driving Foyt's backup car in a last minute entry.

David Pearson qualified for the pole position with a top speed of 161.223 miles per hour (259.463 km/h) while the average racing speed was 141.226 miles per hour (227.281 km/h). His next pole position achievement would be at the 1977 World 600. Notable crew chiefs that participated in this race included Junie Donlavey, Jake Elder, Harry Hyde, Dale Inman, Bud Moore, Sterling Marlin and Tim Brewer.

Buck Baker would make his last NASCAR start here before retiring with a 34th-place finish in the books. He would go on to tutor an adolescent Jeff Gordon; who would go on to become one of the best NASCAR drivers in the "modern" era of NASCAR. Hoss Ellington would make his first win as a NASCAR owner while bending the rules so that both his vehicles could compete. Gordon Johncock would also retire from NASCAR after this race.

David Pearson had to get out of his #21 Purolator Mercury in this race. Neil Bonnett, an early retiree in this one, hopped into the Wood Brothers special as a relief driver to help out as the car went on to a top-10 finish. It was something of an early bird cameo in the #21 for Bonnett as he would later replace Pearson as the team's Cup driver in early 1979.

Johnny Rutherford had entered the qualifying session carrying a faulty engine; the car was supposedly "set up" and the crews did not need to work on the chassis. Before he took the green to qualify he stopped and backed up a lap as he was screaming for a wedge adjustment. After eight turns down on the left rear he did put the car in the show. The decision was made to check the chassis and the front end settings were backward and the car had qualified with four inches of bite. As the race progressed Rutherford wanted four turns down on the right rear, which made no sense. The spinout that followed did not eliminate the car from the race but the engine failure down the backstretch did. Engines back then were not turned as tight as today. The tachometer was pegged to the maximum. He had clutched the motor and had to exit the race on lap 208 with a 31st-place finish; 13 places worse than the position that he qualified for.

=== Qualifying ===
Grid	No.	Driver	Manufacturer	Speed	Qualifying time	Owner
1	21	David Pearson	Mercury	161.223	33.494	Wood Brothers
2	15	Buddy Baker	Ford	159.915	33.768	Bud Moore
3	43	Richard Petty	Dodge	159.726	33.808	Petty Enterprises
4	11	Cale Yarborough	Chevrolet	159.297	33.899	Junior Johnson
5	2	Bobby Allison	Mercury	158.898	33.984	Roger Penske
6	27	Sam Sommers	Chevrolet	158.744	34.017	M.C. Anderson
7	88	Darrell Waltrip	Chevrolet	158.493	34.071	DiGard
8	71	Dave Marcis	Dodge	157.141	34.364	Nord Krauskopf
9	17	Gordon Johncock	Dodge	157.109	34.371	Nord Krauskopf
10	54	Lennie Pond	Chevrolet	156.849	34.428	Ronnie Elder

== Top 20 finishers ==
Pos	No.	Driver	Manufacturer	Laps	Laps led	Time/Status
1	1	Donnie Allison	Chevrolet	334	59	3:32:51
2	11	Cale Yarborough	Chevrolet	334	81	+12.2 seconds
3	2	Bobby Allison	Mercury	334	8	Lead lap under green flag
4	15	Buddy Baker	Ford	334	106	Lead lap under green flag
5	72	Benny Parsons	Chevrolet	333	0	+1 lap
6	21	David Pearson	Mercury	331	59	+1 lap
7	54	Lennie Pond	Chevrolet	329	0	+3 laps
8	43	Richard Petty	Dodge	328	5	+4 laps
9	90	Dick Brooks	Ford	328	0	+4 laps
10	36	Bobby Wawak	Chevrolet	326	0	+6 laps
11	88	Darrell Waltrip	Chevrolet	325	0	+7 laps
12	67	Buddy Arrington	Dodge	323	0	+11 laps
13	92	Skip Manning	Chevrolet	322	0	+12 laps
14	41	Grant Adcox	Chevrolet	319	0	+14 laps
15	3	Richard Childress	Chevrolet	319	0	+14 laps
16	22	Ricky Rudd	Chevrolet	318	0	+15 laps
17	49	G.C. Spencer	Dodge	316	0	+17 laps
18	48	James Hylton	Chevrolet	315	0	+18 laps
19	05	David Sisco	Chevrolet	315	0	+19 laps
20	33	Earl Brooks	Chevrolet	314	0	+20 laps

== Timeline ==
Section reference:

- Start: David Pearson was leading the other drivers to the green flag to start the first official lap.
- Lap 7: Al Holbert fell out with engine failure.
- Lap 41: A valve stopped working on Gordon Johncock's vehicle.
- Lap 59: A.J. Foyt quit the race despite his vehicle not suffering from any mechanical issues.
- Lap 70: A valve stopped working on Ed Negre's vehicle.
- Lap 80: The clutch stopped functioning on Sam Sommers' vehicle.
- Lap 126: Neil Bonnett fell out with engine failure.
- Lap 144: Bruce Hill fell out with engine failure.
- Lap 148: A valve stopped working on Sonny Easley's vehicle.
- Lap 189: A valve stopped working on Coo Coo Marlin's vehicle.
- Lap 208: Johnny Rutherford managed to blow his vehicle's engine.
- Lap 250: D.K. Ulrich fell out with engine failure.
- Lap 262: A valve stopped working on Dave Marcis' vehicle.
- Lap 268: The rear end of Cecil Gordon's vehicle was forcibly removed in an unsafe manner.
- Finish: Donnie Allison was officially declared the winner of the event.

== Standings after the race ==
Pos	Driver	Points	Differential
1	Cale Yarborough	4225	0
2	Richard Petty	4098	-127
3	Benny Parsons	3914	-311
4	Bobby Allison	3788	-437
5	Dave Marcis	3506	-719
6	Lennie Pond	3494	-731
7	Buddy Baker	3460	-765
8	Richard Childress	3203	-1022
9	Darrell Waltrip	3151	-1074
10 ▲	Dick Brooks	3069	-1156

Preceded by 1976 Wilkes 400	NASCAR Winston Cup Season; 1976	Succeeded by 1976 American 500

Preceded by 1975	National 500/NAPA National 500 races 1976	Succeeded by 1977
