= 1976 NASCAR Winston Cup Series =

American motorsport season

Seasons
- ← 1975 1977 →

The 1976 NASCAR Grand National Winston Cup Series was the 28th season of professional stock car racing in the United States, the 5th modern era season of the Grand National series and sixth under R. J. Reynolds sponsorship through its Winston cigarette brand. The season began on Sunday, January 18 and ended on Sunday, November 21. Cale Yarborough, driving the #11 Junior Johnson Holly Farms Chevrolet scored his first of three consecutive NASCAR Grand National Series Winston Cup Championships. Skip Manning was named NASCAR Rookie of the Year.

== Season recap ==
No	Date	Event	Circuit	Winner
1	January 18	Winston Western 500	Riverside International Raceway	David Pearson
	February 12	125 Mile Qualifying Races	Daytona International Speedway	Dave Marcis
	February 12	125 Mile Qualifying Races	Daytona International Speedway	Darrell Waltrip
2	February 15	**Daytona 500**	Daytona International Speedway	David Pearson
3	February 29	Carolina 500	North Carolina Speedway	Richard Petty
4	March 7	Richmond 400	Richmond Fairgrounds Raceway	Dave Marcis
5	March 14	Southeastern 400	Bristol International Speedway	Cale Yarborough
6	March 21	Atlanta 500	Atlanta International Raceway	David Pearson
7	April 4	Gwyn Staley 400	North Wilkesboro Speedway	Cale Yarborough
8	April 11	Rebel 500	Darlington Raceway	David Pearson
9	April 25	Virginia 500	Martinsville Speedway	Darrell Waltrip
10	May 2	**Winston 500**	Alabama International Motor Speedway	Buddy Baker
11	May 8	Music City USA 420	Nashville Speedway	Cale Yarborough
12	May 16	Mason-Dixon 500	Dover Downs International Speedway	Benny Parsons
13	May 30	**World 600**	Charlotte Motor Speedway	David Pearson
14	June 13	Riverside 400	Riverside International Raceway	David Pearson
15	June 20	Cam 2 Motor Oil 400	Michigan International Speedway	David Pearson
16	July 4	Firecracker 400	Daytona International Speedway	Cale Yarborough
17	July 17	Nashville 420	Nashville Speedway	Benny Parsons
18	August 1	Purolator 500	Pocono Raceway	Richard Petty
19	August 8	Talladega 500	Alabama International Motor Speedway	Dave Marcis
20	August 22	Champion Spark Plug 400	Michigan International Speedway	David Pearson
21	August 29	Volunteer 400	Bristol International Speedway	Cale Yarborough
22	September 6	**Southern 500**	Darlington Raceway	David Pearson
23	September 12	Capital City 400	Richmond Fairgrounds Raceway	Cale Yarborough
24	September 19	Delaware 500	Dover Downs International Speedway	Cale Yarborough
25	September 26	Old Dominion 500	Martinsville Speedway	Cale Yarborough
26	October 3	Wilkes 400	North Wilkesboro Speedway	Cale Yarborough
27	October 10	National 500	Charlotte Motor Speedway	Donnie Allison
28	October 24	American 500	North Carolina Speedway	Richard Petty
29	November 7	Dixie 500	Atlanta International Raceway	Dave Marcis
30	November 21	Los Angeles Times 500	Ontario Motor Speedway	David Pearson

Bold denotes a NASCAR Crown Jewel race.

== Race Summaries ==
=== Winston Western 500 ===
The Winston Western 500 was run on January 18 at Riverside International Raceway. Bobby Allison won the pole.

Top-10 results:

1. #21 - David Pearson*
2. #11 - Cale Yarborough
3. #38 - Jimmy Insolo
4. #96 - Ray Elder
5. #72 - Benny Parsons
6. #54 - Lennie Pond
7. #3 - Richard Childress
8. #71 - Dave Marcis
9. #48 - James Hylton
10. #73 - Bill Schmitt
- This was Pearson's first road course victory since 1966, and the first Riverside victory for the Wood Brothers Racing team since 1968. Pearson led 124 of 191 laps.
- Richard Petty started 27th and stormed through the field to lead 15 laps, but fell out with engine failure.
- On lap 18, Darrell Waltrip suffered a brake failure in turn eight, which sent his car plowing over the fencing and landing near a spectator area. Waltrip drove back to the pits and ultimately finished 21st.
- This was Roger Penske's final race fielding an AMC Matador. Penske and driver Bobby Allison would race for Mercury for the rest of the year.

=== Daytona 500 ===
The 18th running of the Daytona 500 was run on February 15 at Daytona International Speedway. A. J. Foyt, Dave Marcis, and Darrell Waltrip qualified out front, but had their times disallowed after failing inspection. This resulted in Ramo Stott starting on the pole. This race is famous for the intense final lap battle between Richard Petty and David Pearson. Both cars made contact in turn 4, resulting in them crashing into the wall and spinning into the infield. Petty's Dodge stopped in the grass in front of the finish line, but stalled. This allowed Pearson, who managed to get his Mercury moving, to pass Petty and cross the line first to score his only Daytona 500 victory.

Top-10 results:

1. #21 - David Pearson*
2. #43 - Richard Petty
3. #72 - Benny Parsons
4. #54 - Lennie Pond
5. #12 - Neil Bonnett
6. #81 - Terry Ryan
7. #70 - J.D. McDuffie
8. #63 - Terry Bivins
9. #3 - Richard Childress
10. #79 - Frank Warren
- This was the forth Daytona 500 victory for the Wood Brothers, and their last until 2011.
- This race was very nearly marred by tragedy on lap 118, when Johnny Ray spun in oil dropped by Ramo Stott, and was then rammed at high-speed in the driver-side door by Skip Manning. Ray was initially declared dead at the hospital, but managed to be revived by resuscitation.

=== Carolina 500 ===
The Carolina 500 was run on February 29 at North Carolina Motor Speedway. Dave Marcis won the pole. Richard Petty won in dominant fashion, leading 362 of 492 laps, and finishing two laps ahead of 2nd-place finisher Darrell Waltrip.

Top-10 results:

1. #43 - Richard Petty
2. #88 - Darrell Waltrip
3. #11 - Cale Yarborough
4. #15 - Buddy Baker
5. #72 - Benny Parsons
6. #6 - Bobby Isaac
7. #41 - Grant Adcox
8. #14 - Coo Coo Marlin
9. #8 - Ed Negre
10. #70 - J.D. McDuffie

=== Richmond 400 ===
The Richmond 400 was run on March 7 at Richmond Fairgrounds Raceway. Bobby Allison won the pole.

Top-10 results:

1. #71 - Dave Marcis
2. #43 - Richard Petty
3. #2 - Bobby Allison
4. #11 - Cale Yarborough
5. #63 - Terry Bivins
6. #3 - Richard Childress
7. #24 - Cecil Gordon
8. #05 - David Sisco
9. #72 - Benny Parsons
10. #64 - Elmo Langley

=== Southeastern 400 ===
The Southeastern 400 was run on March 14 at Bristol International Speedway. Buddy Baker won the pole. Cale Yarborough led 285 of 400 laps and scored his first of 9 race victories in 1976.

Top-10 results:

1. #11 - Cale Yarborough
2. #88 - Darrell Waltrip
3. #72 - Benny Parsons*
4. #71 - Dave Marcis
5. #2 - Bobby Allison
6. #90 - Dick Brooks
7. #48 - James Hylton
8. #8 - Ed Negre
9. #67 - Buddy Arrington
10. #70 - J.D. McDuffie
- Benny Parsons took the points lead after this race, as Richard Petty failed to finish after crashing with Cecil Gordon and Bill Champion on lap 64.

=== Atlanta 500 ===
The Atlanta 500 was run on March 21 at Atlanta International Raceway. Dave Marcis won the pole. NASCAR mandated smaller carburetors beginning with this race. David Pearson won after falling off the lead lap early, and spending the next 225 laps fighting to get back into contention. Cale Yarborough finished third, a lap down after making up three laps of a four-lap deficit.

Top-10 results:

1. #21 - David Pearson
2. #72 - Benny Parsons
3. #11 - Cale Yarborough*
4. #54 - Lennie Pond
5. #88 - Darrell Waltrip
6. #14 - Coo Coo Marlin
7. #90 - Dick Brooks
8. #12 - Neil Bonnett
9. #05 - David Sisco
10. #60 - Jackie Rogers

=== Gwyn Staley 400 ===
The Gwyn Staley 400 was run on April 4 at North Wilkesboro Speedway. Dave Marcis won the pole. Cale Yarborough dominated en route to victory at Junior Johnson's home track, leading 364 laps.

Top-10 results:

1. #11 - Cale Yarborough
2. #43 - Richard Petty
3. #2 - Bobby Allison
4. #72 - Benny Parsons
5. #70 - J.D. McDuffie
6. #54 - Lennie Pond
7. #90 - Dick Brooks
8. #71 - Dave Marcis
9. #3 - Richard Childress
10. #30 - Walter Ballard

=== Rebel 500 ===
The Rebel 500 was run on April 11 at Darlington Raceway. David Pearson won the pole. Bobby Allison and Darrell Waltrip crashed out on Lap 80, while Richard Petty and Cale Yarborough fell out with engine failures.

Top-10 results:

1. #21 - David Pearson
2. #15 - Buddy Baker
3. #72 - Benny Parsons
4. #54 - Lennie Pond
5. #71 - Dave Marcis
6. #93 - Buck Baker
7. #41 - Grant Adcox
8. #18 - Joe Frasson
9. #3 - Richard Childress
10. #30 - Bruce Hill

=== Virginia 500 ===
The Virginia 500 was run on April 25 at Martinsville Speedway. Dave Marcis won the pole.

Top-10 results:

1. #88 - Darrell Waltrip
2. #11 - Cale Yarborough
3. #21 - David Pearson
4. #43 - Richard Petty
5. #90 - Dick Brooks
6. #2 - Bobby Allison
7. #47 - Bruce Hill
8. #3 - Richard Childress
9. #30 - Walter Ballard
10. #24 - Cecil Gordon

=== Winston 500 ===
The Winston 500 was run on May 2 at Alabama International Motor Speedway. Dave Marcis won the pole. This was the first 500-mile race in Winston Cup history to be completed in under 3 hours, finishing in 2 hours and 56 minutes.

Top-10 results:

1. #15 - Buddy Baker*
2. #11 - Cale Yarborough*
3. #2 - Bobby Allison
4. #43 - Richard Petty*
5. #81 - Terry Ryan
6. #24 - Cecil Gordon
7. #28 - Donnie Allison
8. #47 - Bruce Hill
9. #71 - Dave Marcis
10. #79 - Frank Warren
- Buddy Baker qualified twelfth, a run so disappointing, the Bud Moore team drove back to their Spartanburg, SC shop, over four hours away, to overhaul the engine before returning to Talladega for the race.
- Cale Yarborough took the points lead for the first time all season in this race, as points leader Benny Parsons had issues that resulted in a 26th-place finish.
- Richard Petty finished fourth after stalling the car on an early pitstop and lost a lap.

=== Music City USA 420 ===
The Music City USA 420 was run on May 8 at Nashville Speedway. Benny Parsons won the pole. Yarborough led all but 22 of 420 laps en route to his third victory of the season.

Top-10 results:

1. #11 - Cale Yarborough
2. #43 - Richard Petty
3. #72 - Benny Parsons
4. #15 - Buddy Baker
5. #2 - Bobby Allison
6. #54 - Lennie Pond
7. #71 - Dave Marcis
8. #30 - Walter Ballard
9. #05 - David Sisco
10. #79 - Frank Warren

=== Mason-Dixon 500 ===
The Mason-Dixon 500 was run on May 16 at Dover Downs International Speedway. Dave Marcis won the pole. Benny Parsons suffered nose damage in a mid-race incident, but recovered to lead 161 of the last 169 laps and beat David Pearson by 25 seconds.

Top-10 results:

1. #72 - Benny Parsons
2. #21 - David Pearson
3. #71 - Dave Marcis
4. #2 - Bobby Allison
5. #15 - Buddy Baker
6. #43 - Richard Petty
7. #90 - Dick Brooks
8. #54 - Lennie Pond
9. #50 - Darrell Bryant
10. #3 - Richard Childress
- Points leader Cale Yarborough led 243 laps but was penalized a lap on a pitstop, then fell out with an engine failure and finished 27th, losing the points lead to Parsons.

=== World 600 ===
The World 600 was run on May 30 at Charlotte Motor Speedway. David Pearson won the pole. Pearson and Cale Yarborough fought for the lead and combined to lead 243 of the first 251 laps, but Yarborough lost a lap with a cut tire and finished third.

Top-10 results:

1. #21 - David Pearson
2. #43 - Richard Petty
3. #11 - Cale Yarborough
4. #2 - Bobby Allison
5. #72 - Benny Parsons
6. #28 - Donnie Allison
7. #90 - Dick Brooks
8. #54 - Lennie Pond
9. #18 - Harry Gant
10. #05 - David Sisco
- Janet Guthrie made her NASCAR debut in this race, starting 27th and finishing 15th.
- Bruton Smith made his official return to Charlotte Motor Speedway in this race. Among his first acts was posting $18,000 in lap leader bonuses payable to whoever led the most laps per 100 miles.

=== Riverside 400 ===
The Riverside 400 was run on June 13 at Riverside International Raceway. David Pearson won the pole. Pearson completed a season sweep at Riverside after a race-long battle with Bobby Allison and Cale Yarborough.

Top-10 results:

1. #21 - David Pearson
2. #2 - Bobby Allison
3. #72 - Benny Parsons
4. #96 - Ray Elder
5. #15 - Buddy Baker
6. #88 - Darrell Waltrip
7. #11 - Cale Yarborough
8. #38 - Jimmy Insolo
9. #43 - Richard Petty
10. #71 - Dave Marcis

=== CAM2 Motor Oil 400 ===
The CAM2 Motor Oil 400 was run on June 20 at Michigan International Speedway. Richard Petty won the pole.

Top-10 results:

1. #21 - David Pearson
2. #11 - Cale Yarborough*
3. #2 - Bobby Allison
4. #43 - Richard Petty
5. #15 - Buddy Baker
6. #90 - Dick Brooks
7. #54 - Lennie Pond
8. #05 - David Sisco
9. #60 - Jackie Rogers
10. #24 - Cecil Gordon
- Cale Yarborough dominated before losing power due to a blown head gasket, but managed to recover and finish 2nd.
- Yarborough's runner-up finish helped him regain the points lead, as Benny Parsons lost 21 laps and finished 19th.

=== Firecracker 400 ===
The Firecracker 400 was run on July 4 at Daytona International Speedway. A. J. Foyt won the pole.

Top-10 results:

1. #11 - Cale Yarborough*
2. #21 - David Pearson
3. #2 - Bobby Allison
4. #28 - A.J. Foyt
5. #71 - Dave Marcis
6. #14 - Coo Coo Marlin
7. #72 - Benny Parsons
8. #90 - Dick Brooks
9. #05 - David Sisco
10. #22 - Ricky Rudd
- This was Yarborough's first victory at Daytona since 1968.

=== Nashville 420 ===
The Nashville 420 was run on July 17 at Nashville Speedway. Bobby Allison won the pole. Buddy Baker led 220 laps but fell out while leading with 90 laps to go; Benny Parsons took over and beat Richard Petty and Darrell Waltrip.

Top-10 results:

1. #72 - Benny Parsons
2. #43 - Richard Petty
3. #88 - Darrell Waltrip*
4. #54 - Lennie Pond
5. #11 - Cale Yarborough
6. #71 - Dave Marcis
7. #2 - Bobby Allison*
8. #14 - Coo Coo Marlin
9. #92 - Skip Manning
10. #36 - Bobby Wawak
- Neil Bonnett served as a relief driver for Bobby Allison, as Allison was injured in a bad crash at a local race in Elko, MN. Allison started the race, then pitted after the opening lap to allow Bonnett to take over.
- Darrell Waltrip finished 3rd following the hiring of engine builder Marion "Ducky" Newman by DiGard, after Newman left Bud Moore's team in a salary dispute.

=== Purolator 500 ===
The Purolator 500 was run on August 1 at Pocono International Raceway. Cale Yarborough won the pole. NASCAR allowed teams to use larger carburetors again beginning with this race. David Pearson was leading the race late, but suffered a blown tire coming to the white flag and ultimately finished 4th. This race had 47 lead changes.

Top-10 results:

1. #43 - Richard Petty
2. #15 - Buddy Baker
3. #72 - Benny Parsons
4. #21 - David Pearson
5. #54 - Lennie Pond
6. #24 - Cecil Gordon
7. #67 - Buddy Arrington
8. #60 - Jackie Rogers
9. #3 - Richard Childress
10. #05 - David Sisco
- Championship leader Cale Yarborough blew his engine halfway through the race, but the Junior Johnson team managed to change engines in the garage in 33 minutes, allowing Yarborough to return to the race. Yarborough finished 25th, losing the points lead to Benny Parsons in the process.

=== Talladega 500 ===
The Talladega 500 was run on August 8 at Alabama International Motor Speedway. Dave Marcis won the pole. Several championship front-runners suffered mechanical failures in this race, including points leader Benny Parsons, Richard Petty, and 2nd in points Cale Yarborough. This race had 57 lead changes, the most all season.

Top-10 results:

1. #71 - Dave Marcis
2. #15 - Buddy Baker
3. #90 - Dick Brooks
4. #48 - James Hylton
5. #54 - Lennie Pond
6. #30 - Tighe Scott
7. #70 - J.D. McDuffie
8. #3 - Richard Childress
9. #92 - Skip Manning
10. #26 - Jimmy Lee Capps
- After Yarborough blew his engine, Junior Johnson's team changed engines mid-race for the second consecutive week. Yarborough finished 51 laps down in 26th.
- Darrell Waltrip blew his engine, and following the race, DiGard fired team manager Mario Rossi and engine builders Carroll "Stump" Davis and Keith Harlan. The team hired Robert Yates to assist Marion Newman.
- Benny Parsons' 39th place finish allowed Yarborough to retake the points lead, and would hold on to it for the rest of the season.

=== Champion Spark Plug 400 ===
The Champion Spark Plug 400 was run on August 22 at Michigan International Speedway. David Pearson won the pole.

Top-10 results:

1. #21 - David Pearson
2. #11 - Cale Yarborough
3. #43 - Richard Petty
4. #2 - Bobby Allison
5. #71 - Dave Marcis
6. #12 - Neil Bonnett
7. #40 - D.K. Ulrich
8. #70 - J.D. McDuffie
9. #72 - Benny Parsons
10. #36 - Bobby Wawak
- Junior Johnson hired a security guard to watch over Yarborough's engines, suspecting sabotage after back-to-back engine failures.

=== Volunteer 400 ===
The Volunteer 400 was run on August 29 at Bristol International Speedway. Darrell Waltrip won the pole.

Top-10 results:

1. #11 - Cale Yarborough
2. #43 - Richard Petty
3. #88 - Darrell Waltrip
4. #72 - Benny Parsons
5. #15 - Buddy Baker
6. #2 - Bobby Allison
7. #90 - Dick Brooks
8. #54 - Lennie Pond
9. #36 - Bobby Wawak
10. #3 - Richard Childress

=== Southern 500 ===
The Southern 500 was run on September 6 at Darlington Raceway. David Pearson won the pole.

Top-10 results:

1. #21 - David Pearson*
2. #43 - Richard Petty
3. #88 - Darrell Waltrip
4. #71 - Dave Marcis
5. #54 - Lennie Pond
6. #90 - Dick Brooks
7. #72 - Benny Parsons
8. #14 - Coo Coo Marlin
9. #2 - Bobby Allison
10. #36 - Bobby Wawak
- This was David Pearson's first Southern 500 victory, having previously won the Rebel 400 six times.
- Cale Yarborough hit a guardrail post on pit road, which bent the rear-end assembly. Which assistance from Richard Childress, the Junior Johnson crew replaced the assembly and Cale finished 23rd. These issues, coupled with Richard Petty's 2nd-place finish, reduced Yarborough's championship lead to 29 points.
- A scary accident occurred when Skip Manning spun in oil, and was slammed into by Joe Frasson, severely caving-in the driver-side door, and pinning Manning in the car. Both the door and roof had to be sawed off to extract Manning from the wreck. Despite the severity of the incident, Manning was not seriously injured.

=== Capital City 400 ===
The Capital City 400 was run on September 12 at Richmond Fairgrounds Raceway. Benny Parsons won the pole. Bobby Allison made his most determined bid for a win of the season, chasing Cale Yarborough and finished one length back at the finish. Yarborough's victory increased his points lead over Richard Petty to 44 points.

Top-10 results:

1. #11 - Cale Yarborough
2. #2 - Bobby Allison
3. #43 - Richard Petty
4. #88 - Darrell Waltrip
5. #15 - Buddy Baker
6. #54 - Lennie Pond
7. #71 - Dave Marcis
8. #90 - Dick Brooks
9. #30 - Terry Bivins
10. #36 - Bobby Wawak

=== Delaware 500 ===
The Delaware 500 was run on September 19 at Dover Downs International Speedway. Cale Yarborough won the pole. Cale Yarborough made up two laps on two separate occasions and won his second straight race.

Top-10 results:

1. #11 - Cale Yarborough
2. #43 - Richard Petty
3. #21 - David Pearson
4. #2 - Bobby Allison
5. #15 - Buddy Baker
6. #90 - Dick Brooks
7. #70 - J.D. McDuffie
8. #40 - D.K. Ulrich
9. #48 - James Hylton
10. #67 - Buddy Arrington

=== Old Dominion 500 ===
The Old Dominion 500 was run on September 26 at Martinsville Speedway. Darrell Waltrip won the pole. This race ended after 340 of 500 laps due to rain.

Top-10 results:

1. #11 - Cale Yarborough
2. #88 - Darrell Waltrip
3. #15 - Buddy Baker
4. #43 - Richard Petty
5. #72 - Benny Parsons
6. #90 - Dick Brooks
7. #63 - Jimmy Hensley
8. #30 - Terry Bivins
9. #55 - Sonny Easley
10. #3 - Richard Childress

=== Wilkes 400 ===
The Wilkes 400 was run on October 3 at North Wilkesboro Speedway. Darrell Waltrip won the pole. Cale Yarborough scored his fourth consecutive race victory, and his ninth of the season.

Top-10 results:

1. #11 - Cale Yarborough
2. #72 - Benny Parsons
3. #43 - Richard Petty
4. #15 - Buddy Baker
5. #54 - Lennie Pond
6. #90 - Dick Brooks
7. #70 - J.D. McDuffie
8. #36 - Bobby Wawak
9. #30 - Terry Bivins
10. #92 - Sonny Easley

=== National 500 ===
The National 500 was run on October 10 at Charlotte Motor Speedway. David Pearson won the pole. Donnie Allison scored a surprise victory in a backup Hoss Ellington Monte Carlo.

Top-10 results:

1. #1 - Donnie Allison*
2. #11 - Cale Yarborough
3. #2 - Bobby Allison
4. #15 - Buddy Baker
5. #72 - Benny Parsons
6. #21 - David Pearson*
7. #54 - Lennie Pond
8. #43 - Richard Petty
9. #90 - Dick Brooks
10. #36 - Bobby Wawak
- This was Donnie Allison's first Winston Cup victory since 1971.
- In post-race inspection, Donnie Allison's engine measured a tick over the legal displacement, but after cooling down, the engine was within limits. Team owner Hoss Ellington stated, "This one's legal. We left all the cheater stuff at Darlington."
- 57-year old veteran Buck Baker competed in his final Winston Cup race. The two-time Series champion started 38th and finished 24th.
- Neil Bonnett served as a relief driver for David Pearson in this race, after Pearson started experiencing back pain the previous day.

=== American 500 ===
The American 500 was run on October 24 at North Carolina Motor Speedway. David Pearson won the pole. Green flag pit stops became frequent, as Richard Petty spent a total of 125 seconds on pit road, while 2nd-place finisher Lennie Pond spent 54 seconds.

Top-10 results:

1. #43 - Richard Petty
2. #54 - Lennie Pond
3. #88 - Darrell Waltrip
4. #2 - Bobby Allison
5. #11 - Cale Yarborough
6. #21 - David Pearson
7. #1 - Donnie Allison
8. #90 - Dick Brooks
9. #92 - Skip Manning
10. #14 - Coo Coo Marlin

=== Dixie 500 ===
The Dixie 500 was run on November 7 at Atlanta International Raceway. Buddy Baker won the pole.

Top-10 results:

1. #71 - Dave Marcis*
2. #21 - David Pearson
3. #1 - Donnie Allison
4. #11 - Cale Yarborough*
5. #15 - Buddy Baker
6. #72 - Benny Parsons
7. #88 - Darrell Waltrip
8. #12 - Neil Bonnett
9. #27 - Sam Sommers
10. #36 - Bobby Wawak
- This was Dave Marcis' last career non-short track victory, and his last victory until 1982. This was also the last victory for the K&K Insurance racing team.
- Dale Earnhardt made his third career Cup start in this race and survived a vicious tumble after colliding with Dick Brooks.
- Richard Petty's engine failure all but clinched the season championship for Cale Yarborough, as Yarborough's 4th-place finish extended his points lead to 183 points, nearly a full race ahead of Petty.

=== Los Angeles Times 500 ===
The LA Times 500 was run on November 21 at Ontario Motor Speedway. Cale Yarborough clinched the season championship by taking the green flag, only to fall out with transmission trouble after leading 68 laps.

Top-10 results:

1. #21 - David Pearson
2. #54 - Lennie Pond
3. #72 - Benny Parsons
4. #90 - Dick Brooks
5. #48 - James Hylton
6. #36 - Bobby Wawak
7. #50 - Terry Bivins
8. #92 - Skip Manning
9. #81 - Terry Ryan
10. #47 - Bruce Hill
- Bobby Allison blew his engine simultaneously with his brother Donnie, and after the race, told Roger Penske he was leaving the team. This comes just one week after Penske announced that Allison was returning to the team for 1977.

== Full Drivers’ Championship ==
(key) Bold – Pole position awarded by time. Italics – Pole position set by owner's points. * – Most laps led.

Pos.	Driver	RIV	DAY	CAR	RCH	BRI	ATL	NWS	DAR	MAR	TAL	NSV	DOV	CLT	RIV	MCH	DAY	NSV	POC	TAL	MCH	BRI	DAR	RCH	DOV	MAR	NWS	CLT	CAR	ATL	ONT	Pts
1	Cale Yarborough	2	42	3	4	1*	3*	1*	25	2	2	1*	27*	3	7	2*	1*	5	**25**	26	2*	1*	23	1*	**1***	1*	1*	2	5	4	23	4644
2	Richard Petty	25	2	1*	2	27	28	2	23	4	4	2	6	2	9	**4**	22	2	1	20	3	2	2	3	2	4	3	8	1*	28	27	4449
3	Benny Parsons	5	3	5	9	3	2	4	3	20	26	**3**	1	5	3	19	7	1	3	39	9	4	7	**29**	26	5	2	5	31	6	3	4304
4	Bobby Allison	**15**	25	21	**3**	5	29	3	18	6	3	5	4	4	2	3	3	**7**	24	23	4	6	9	2	4	27	29	3	4	26	33	4097
5	Lennie Pond	6	4	30	23	22	4	6	4	22	11	6	8	6	25	7	32	4	5	5	25	8	5	6	34	29	5	7	2	24	2	3930
6	Dave Marcis	8	27	**26**	1*	4	**32**	**8**	5	**21**	**9**	7	**3**	29	10	30	5	6	22	**1**	5	22	4	7	14	12	17	29	25	1*	24	3875
7	Buddy Baker	28	33	4	29	**21**	25	26	2*	27	1*	4	5	28	5	5	35	23*	2	2*	31	5	31	5	5	3	4	4*	28	**5**	39	3745
8	Darrell Waltrip	21	32	2	24	2	5	22	31	1*	33	12	30	11	6	29	39	3	26	37	27	**3**	3	4	31	**2**	**24**	11	3	7	40	3505
9	David Pearson	1*	1	29			1		**1**	3	37		2	**1***	**1**	1	2		2	4*	**1**		**1***		3	19		**6**	**6**	2	**1***	3483
10	Dick Brooks	33	41	24	26	6	7	7	35	5	12		7	7		6	8	29	31	3	29	7	6	8	6	6	6	9	8	29	4	3447
11	Richard Childress	7	9	23	6	20	11	9	9	8	24	17	10	17	11	18	12	28	9	8	13	10	36	25	20	10	23	15	27	25	36	3428
12	J. D. McDuffie	19	7	10	21	10	27	5	27	23	27	20	15	25	14	16	24	13	21	7	8	23	25	11	7	21	7	23	26	13	11	3400
13	James Hylton	9	23	19	15	7	31	13	32	12	28	18	17	13	16	35	26	11	17	4	21	13	20	16	9	18	11	18	29	12	5	3380
14	D. K. Ulrich	12	19	17	20	25	21	19	16	16	20	11	12	16	26	12	16	17	38	21	7	11	16	17	8	13	26	30	14	18	25	3280
15	Cecil Gordon	23	18	34	7	28	16	12	11	10	6	14	36	20	12	10	34	15	6	29	26	21	12	13	35	15	13	28	15	23	16	3247
16	Frank Warren	11	10	28	19	14	15	20	17	29	10	10	13	18	20	24	13	12	16	12	23	20	19	26	23	14	22	26	22	27	18	3240
17	David Sisco		29	20	8	23	9	27	13	24	14	9	22	10		8	9	16	10	31	32	14	39	23	11	16	14	19	20	33	30	2994
18	Skip Manning **(R)**		30	35	30	12	17	11	14	17	16	22	11	33		20	31	9	12	9	14	18	32		12	23	21	13	9	14	8	2931
19	Ed Negre		13	9	13	8	13	17	28	30	32	19	34	27	24	17	37	25	11	27	30	29	26	27	15	22	25	37	13		12	2709
20	Buddy Arrington		11	31	11	9	30	18	24	28	22	26	31	14		11	40	26	7	33		17	35	18	10	11	12	12	16		DNQ	2573
21	Terry Bivins **(R)**		8	13	5	24	26											22	19		15	12	14	9	32	8	9	25	17	22	7	2099
22	Bobby Wawak						DNQ				29		26	26		26	14	10	14	24	10	9	10	10	22	25	8	10	33	10	6	2062
23	Bruce Hill		36	22			18		10	7	8	23	39	37		25	25	27	29	32	19		22		36	30		34	35	11	10	1995
24	Jimmy Means **(R)**		40				34				31	15		39		23	11	24	23	11	24	19	18	24	27	20	27		23	17	DNQ	1752
25	Dick May		38	16					15					21		14	27	21	18	19	16	16	28	19	17	17	20		30	32		1719
26	Walter Ballard			25	14	19	24	10	QL	9		8	16	22		31			37			26		22	16						DNQ	1554
27	Henley Gray			36		30	23		29			25				33			20	17	11	15	21	12	13		19		36		37	1425
28	Coo Coo Marlin		21	8			6									13	6	8		34	12		8					32	10	30	DNQ	1412
29	Gary Myers		DNQ							11	35	27	25	30		27		19	27			27	27	21	29	26	18		34			1296
30	Jackie Rogers		15	12			10							36		9	38		8	15	35		15						19			1173
31	Grant Adcox		DNQ	7			12		7		19			12			30			18			13					14	12	20		1163
32	Neil Bonnett **(R)**		5				8		30	19	39				29		33			38	6		24				28	35		8		1130
33	Tommy Gale		DNQ	15			35		22		18		37			21	29		34	40					25				24		17	1005
34	Donnie Allison								34		7		35	6									33					1	7	3	34	988
35	Joe Mihalic		17		12	26	DNQ						18				23		13	13	22				18							981
36	Elmo Langley				10	15		15		13		13										25		15							QL	824
37	Travis Tiller		DNQ	18	17	18				26			23			22			33					28					32		DNQ	816
38	Sonny Easley	32																								9	10	33	11	15	14	772
39	Joe Frasson		14						8		36					36		30	40		28	30	34									707
40	Jabe Thomas		DNQ		27	13		21		14		21	14																			648
41	Bill Elliott **(R)**			33			36				38			23		28	19	14	32													635
42	Dean Dalton												29						15		18	28	11	14							DNQ	633
43	Earle Canavan		DNQ		18	17			19							34			36				29		24						DNQ	610
44	Rick Newsom									18		30	20										38		30	24			18			607
45	Tighe Scott		35								17					15			30	6	36											566
46	Terry Ryan		6								5			40		32															9	558
47	Darrell Bryant		DNQ	11			20		36		40		9	19					35				40									546
48	Buck Baker								6		34	16	28				36			16			17					24				513
49	Chuck Bown	16													19											28				31	19	481
50	Baxter Price		DNQ			16		23				24	21					20	28													479
51	Dick Skillen		31						21		21						17			30												455
52	Sam Sommers													24			DNQ			36			30					36		9		412
53	Ricky Rudd		DNQ								23		33				10						DNQ					16				407
54	Jimmy Lee Capps		24				33										21			10												389
55	Bob Burcham		DNQ				14		33		30			35						35												374
56	John Utsman **(R)**		DNQ	14			19		12		15																					345
57	Harold Miller		DNQ				DNQ										18			14	20											333
58	Ray Elder	4													4																DNQ	320
59	G. C. Spencer																			25	34							17		35		319
60	Jerry Sisco					11	22		26																							312
61	Jimmy Insolo	3													8																21	307
62	Don Puskarich	27													21																15	300
63	Earl Brooks								20				32											20				20				273
64	Bill Champion		DNQ		28	29		16																								270
65	Jack Donohue																								19				21	36		261
66	Richard D. Brown				22			24																			30					261
67	Junior Miller							14																			15					239
68	Jimmy Hensley									25																7						234
69	Roy Smith		20												27																38	234
70	Eddie Bradshaw	18													15																DNQ	227
71	Chuck Wahl	22													13																DNQ	226
72	Bill Schmitt	10																													26	219
73	Bruce Jacobi		DNQ																				37		28			27			DNQ	213
74	Gary Matthews	17													23																	206
75	Bill Polich	26	DNQ												17																	197
76	Larry LaMay																							30			16					188
77	Walter Wallace											28						18														188
78	Ron Esau	14													35																DNQ	179
79	Gary Johnson	29																													DNQ	176
80	Carl Joiner	20																													31	173
81	Ferrel Harris		QL								25						28															167
82	Hugh Pearson	24													30																DNQ	164
83	Johnny Ray **(R)**	31	28																													149
84	Harry Gant													9																		138
85	Jim Thirkettle														34																29	137
86	Larry Esau	13																														124
87	Jim Vandiver										13																					124
88	Gene Felton																													16		115
89	Jim Hurtubise		16																													115
90	Don Reynolds														18																DNQ	109
91	Budd Hagelin												19												37							106
92	Bill Dennis																											21				100
93	Tommy Ellis																								21							100
94	Richie Panch																													21		100
95	John Dineen														22																DNQ	97
96	Doc Faustina		DNQ										24																		DNQ	91
97	Clyde Lynn																					24										91
98	Glen McDuffie			27																												82
99	J. C. Danielson														28																	79
100	Glenn Francis																														28	79
101	Sterling Marlin											29																				76
102	Hershel McGriff	30																													32	73
103	Dale Earnhardt													31																19		70
104	Rusty Sanders														31																	70
105	John Hamson														32																DNQ	67
106	Dick Trickle													32																		67
107	John Haver																				33											64
108	Ernie Stierly														33																DNQ	64
109	Sam Beler	34																														61
110	Charlie Glotzbach													34																		61
111	Harry Jefferson	35																													DNQ	58
112	Johnny Kieper																														35	58
113	Tom Williams		37																												DNQ	52
114	Bobby Isaac			6										38																		49
115	Bill Hollar						DNQ												39													46
116	Earl Ross		39																													46
117	Janet Guthrie													15			15								33			22			20	
118	A. J. Foyt		22*	32													**4**			22								38				
119	Neil Castles				25			25					38																			
120	David Hobbs		34																		17											
121	Johnny Rutherford																20											31				
122	Salt Walther		12																													
123	Larry Phillips																														13	
124	Bruce Blodgett									15																						
125	Ernie Shaw				16																											
126	Mike Hiss																														22	
127	Ramo Stott		**26**																													
128	Jeff Handy							28																								
129	Billy McGinnis																													34		
130	Gordon Johncock																											39				
131	Al Holbert																											40				
132	Elliott Forbes-Robinson		DNQ																													
133	Dave Decker		DNQ																													
134	Bill Seifert		DNQ																													
135	Darel Dieringer		DNQ																													
136	Blackie Wangerin		DNQ																													
137	John Banks		DNQ																													
138	Terry Link		DNQ																													
139	Jim Fleming		DNQ																													
140	Jerry Mabie																DNQ															
141	Jerry Hansen																					DNQ										
142	Earl Ressler																					DNQ										
143	Steve Pfeifer																														DNQ	
144	Richard White																														DNQ	
145	Ross Kusah																														DNQ	
146	Leon Fox																														DNQ	
147	Dennis Wilson																														DNQ	
148	Bryce Mann																														DNQ	
149	Sue Williams																														DNQ	
150	Arlene Hiss																														DNQ	
151	Terry Wood																														DNQ	
152	Don Graham																														DNQ	
153	Jack Simpson																														DNQ	
154	John Weibel																														DNQ	
155	Sumner McKnight																														DNQ	
156	Dick Whalen																														DNQ	
157	Chris Monoleos																														DNQ	
158	Norm Palmer																														DNQ	
159	Bill Osborne																														DNQ	
160	Jerry Barnett																														DNQ	
161	Perry Cottingham																														DNQ	
162	Marty Robbins		Wth																												DNQ	
Pos.	Driver	RIV	DAY	CAR	RCH	BRI	ATL	NWS	DAR	MAR	TAL	NSV	DOV	CLT	RIV	MCH	DAY	NSV	POC	TAL	MCH	BRI	DAR	RCH	DOV	MAR	NWS	CLT	CAR	ATL	ONT	Pts

== See also ==
- 1976 NASCAR Winston West Series
