= 1976 Music City USA 420 =

Auto race held at Fairgrounds Speedway in 1976

Race details
- Race 11 of 30 in the 1976 NASCAR Winston Cup Series season
- Date: May 8, 1976
- Official name: Music City USA 420
- Location: Nashville Speedway, Nashville, Tennessee
- Course: Permanent racing facility
- Course length: 0.959 km (0.596 miles)
- Distance: 420 laps, 250.3 mi (402.8 km)
- Weather: Chilly with temperatures of 68 °F (20 °C); wind speeds of 12 miles per hour (19 km/h)
- Average speed: 84.512 miles per hour (136.009 km/h)

Pole position
Driver	Benny Parsons	DeWitt Racing

Most laps led
Driver	Cale Yarborough	Junior Johnson & Associates
- Laps: 398

Winner
No. 11	Cale Yarborough	Junior Johnson & Associates

Television in the United States
- Network: untelevised
- Announcers: none

The 1976 Music City USA 420 was a NASCAR Winston Cup Series race that took place on May 8, 1976, at Nashville Speedway (now Fairgrounds Speedway) in Nashville, Tennessee.

The five drivers that dominated the 1976 NASCAR Winston Cup Series season were David Pearson (average finish of 7th place), Cale Yarborough (average finish of 8th place), Richard Petty (average finish of 9th place), Benny Parsons (average finish of 10th place), and Bobby Allison (average finish 12th place).

== Background ==
Nashville Speedway was converted to a half-mile paved oval in 1957, when it began to be a NASCAR series track. The speedway was lengthened between the 1969 and 1970 seasons. The corners were cut down from 35 degrees to their present 18 degrees in 1972.

== Race report ==
It took two hours and fifty-seven minutes for Cale Yarborough to defeat Richard Petty by 1.3 seconds in front of 16000 spectators. Five cautions slowed the race for 33 laps along with 16 changes in the lead.

Rick Newsom finished last due to an ignition problem on lap 22. All of the 30 drivers on the grid were American-born. Benny Parsons qualified for the pole position with a speed of 104.328 miles per hour (167.900 km/h) while the average speed of the race was 84.512 miles per hour (136.009 km/h). The winner received $8,565 in winnings ($47,327.89 when adjusted for inflation) while the last-place finisher would win $305 ($1,685.35 when adjusted for inflation).

19-year-old Sterling Marlin made NASCAR debut in his race; he started in 30th place and finished in 29th place. Marlin filled in for his father Coo Coo while he was recovering from an injury.

Notable crew chiefs for this race were Billy Hagan, Harry Hyde, Jake Elder, Dale Inman, Bud Moore, Coo Coo Marlin, Tim Brewer and Travis Carter.

=== Qualifying ===
Grid	No.	Driver	Manufacturer
1	72	Benny Parsons	Chevrolet
2	11	Cale Yarborough	Chevrolet
3	71	Dave Marcis	Dodge
4	2	Bobby Allison	Mercury
5	15	Buddy Baker	Ford
6	88	Darrell Waltrip	Chevrolet
7	43	Richard Petty	Dodge
8	54	Lennie Pond	Chevrolet
9	3	Richard Childress	Chevrolet
10	05	David Sisco	Chevrolet
11	92	Skip Manning	Chevrolet
12	40	D.K. Ulrich	Chevrolet
13	70	J.D. McDuffie	Chevrolet
14	30	Walter Ballard	Chevrolet
15	79	Frank Warren	Dodge
16	47	Bruce Hill	Chevrolet
17	24	Cecil Gordon	Chevrolet
18	45	Baxter Price	Chevrolet
19	67	Buddy Arrington	Dodge
20	8	Ed Negre	Dodge

== Finishing order ==
1. Cale Yarborough (No. 11)
2. Richard Petty (No. 43)
3. Benny Parsons (No. 72)
4. Buddy Baker (No. 15)
5. Bobby Allison (No. 2)
6. Lennie Pond (No. 54)
7. Dave Marcis (No. 71)
8. Walter Ballard (No. 30)
9. David Sisco (No. 05)
10. Frank Warren (No. 79)
11. D.K. Ulrich (No. 40)
12. Darrell Waltrip* (No. 88)
13. Elmo Langley (No. 64)
14. Cecil Gordon (No. 24)
15. Jimmy Means (No. 52)
16. Buck Baker (No. 33)
17. Richard Childress* (No. 3)
18. James Hylton* (No. 48)
19. Ed Negre* (No. 8)
20. J.D. McDuffie* (No. 70)
21. Jabe Thomas* (No. 25)
22. Skip Manning* (No. 92)
23. Bruce Hill* (No. 47)
24. Baxter Price* (No. 45)
25. Henley Gray* (No. 19)
26. Buddy Arrington* (No. 67)
27. Gary Myers* (No. 95)
28. Walter Wallace* (No. 87)
29. Sterling Marlin* (No. 14)
30. Rick Newsom* (No. 20)

* Driver failed to finish race

== Timeline ==
Section reference:

- Start: Cale Yarborough was leading the starting grid as the drivers crossed the start/finish line.
- Lap 39: Lennie Pond took over the lead from Cale Yarborough.
- Lap 40: Dave Marcis took over the lead from Lennie Pond.
- Lap 47: Cale Yarborough took over the lead from Dave Marcis.
- Lap 59: The rear end of Walter Wallace's vehicle came off in an unsafe manner.
- Lap 72: Buddy Arrington managed to overheat his vehicle.
- Lap 131: Baxter Price blew his engine while driving at high speeds.
- Lap 150: Benny Parsons took over the lead from Cale Yarborough.
- Lap 151: Richard Petty took over the lead from Benny Parsons.
- Lap 152: Cale Yarborough took over the lead from Richard Petty.
- Lap 161: Bobby Allison took over the lead from Cale Yarborough.
- Lap 162: Cale Yarborough took over the lead from Bobby Allison.
- Lap 167: Skip Manning blew his engine while driving at high speeds.
- Lap 171: Jabe Thomas blew his engine while driving at high speeds.
- Lap 180: Darrell Waltrip took over the lead from Cale Yarborough.
- Lap 185: Cale Yarborough took over the lead from Darrell Waltrip.
- Lap 227: Ed Negre managed to overheat his vehicle.
- Lap 256: James Hylton blew his engine while driving at high speeds.
- Lap 303: Benny Parsons took over the lead from Cale Yarborough.
- Lap 305: Cale Yarborough took over the lead from Benny Parsons.
- Lap 348: Benny Parsons took over the lead from Cale Yarborough.
- Lap 350: Darrell Waltrip took over the lead from Benny Parsons.
- Lap 352: Cale Yarborough took over the lead from Darrell Waltrip.
- Lap 393: The rear end came off of Darrell Waltrip's vehicle in an unsafe manner.
- Finish: Cale Yarborough was officially declared the winner of the event.

== Standings after the race ==
Pos	Driver	Points	Differential
1	Cale Yarborough	1720	0
2	Benny Parsons	1656	-64
3	Richard Petty	1573	-147
4	Bobby Allison	1491	-229
5	Lennie Pond	1446	-274
6 ▼	Dave Marcis	1442	-278
7	Richard Childress	1382	-338
8	Darrell Waltrip	1311	-409
9	Cecil Gordon	1276	-444
10 ▲	Buddy Baker	1274	-446

Preceded by 1976 Winston 500	NASCAR Winston Cup Season; 1976	Succeeded by 1976 Mason-Dixon 500

Preceded by 1975	Music City USA 420 races 1976	Succeeded by 1977
