= 1976 Cam 2 Motor Oil 400 =

Auto race held at Michigan International Speedway in 1976

Race details
- Race 15 of 30 in the 1976 NASCAR Winston Cup Series season
- 1976 Cam 2 Motor Oil 400 program cover
- Date: June 20, 1976
- Official name: Cam 2 Motor Oil 400
- Location: Michigan International Speedway, Brooklyn, Michigan
- Course: Permanent racing facility
- Course length: 2.000 miles (3.218 km)
- Distance: 200 laps, 400 mi (643 km)
- Weather: Temperatures of 80.1 °F (26.7 °C); wind speeds of 9.9 miles per hour (15.9 km/h)
- Average speed: 141.149 miles per hour (227.157 km/h)
- Attendance: 46,000

Pole position
Driver	Richard Petty	Petty Enterprises

Most laps led
Driver	Cale Yarborough	Junior Johnson & Associates
- Laps: 129

Winner
No. 21	David Pearson	Wood Brothers Racing

Television in the United States
- Network: untelevised
- Announcers: none

The 1976 Cam 2 Motor Oil 400 was a NASCAR Winston Cup Series race that took place on June 20, 1976, at Michigan International Speedway in Brooklyn, Michigan.

== Background ==
Michigan International Speedway is a four-turn superspeedway that is 2 miles (3.2 km) long. Opened in 1968, the track's turns are banked at eighteen degrees, while the 3,600-foot-long front stretch, the location of the finish line, is banked at twelve degrees. The back stretch, has a five degree banking and is 2,242 feet long.

== Race report ==
David Pearson defeated Cale Yarborough by three car lengths in front of an audience of 46,000. There were 17 lead changes and three cautions for 20 out of the 200 laps. The race took two hours and fifty minutes. Richard Petty earned the pole position with a speed of 158.569 miles per hour (255.192 km/h), the average speed of the race was 141.148 miles per hour (227.156 km/h). Joe Frasson finished last due to an engine problem on lap 2. All 36 of the drivers on the racing grid were American-born males. The field was dominated by Chevrolet vehicles as opposed to Ford and Mercury vehicles.

Cale Yarborough dominated most of this race, with radio announcer Ken Squier saying it was one of the best runs he'd seen Cale have, but in the closing stages it was David Pearson out front and cruising to a win when a late caution came out for Coo Coo Marlin's blown engine while he was running seventh in the closing laps. Under the yellow the leaders all pitted with Yarborough regaining the lead only for Pearson to pass him on the backstretch after the restart and take the win. Overall it was still a good day for Yarborough as he capitalized on a 74-point swing in the point standings to vault back into the points lead as a result of Benny Parsons' issues. He would eventually become the 1976 NASCAR Winston Cup Series champion.

Bobby Allison was running second very late when he was black flagged for the Penske team having put tape over parts of the grill of his Cam 2 #2 Mercury. That aerodynamic improvement was illegal at the time but later became commonplace. Allison still recovered to finish third in part due to how few cars were left on the lead lap and the late caution.

The grand total of this race's prize purse was $105,355 ($596,087 when considering inflation).

Although the race is not televised by either CBS or ABC, the rare films and archived radio coverage (commentated by Ken Squier) of the race is included in a video for NASCAR's segment called "Retro Radioactive" during the franchise's 75th anniversary in 2023. The video also included the rare archived radio chatter between the racers and their crew chiefs as well as the radio voice of Competition Director Bill Gazaway, which captured his words "We do not run tape on the outside of the car." as he spots Bobby Allison's car having tapes in the grill. Allison's archived radio voice was also captured in the video as he was talking to owner Roger Penske to "put newspaper on the grill to make the car run faster."

=== Qualifying ===
Grid	No.	Driver	Manufacturer	Owner
1	43	Richard Petty	Dodge	Petty Enterprises
2	2	Bobby Allison	Mercury	Roger Penske
3	15	Buddy Baker	Ford	Bud Moore
4	71	Dave Marcis	Dodge	Nord Krauskopf
5	72	Benny Parsons	Chevrolet	L.G. DeWitt
6	11	Cale Yarborough	Chevrolet	Junior Johnson
7	54	Lennie Pond	Chevrolet	Ronnie Elder
8	21	David Pearson	Mercury	Wood Brothers
9	52	Jimmy Means	Chevrolet	Bill Gray
10	88	Darrell Waltrip	Chevrolet	DiGard Racing
11	24	Cecil Gordon	Chevrolet	Cecil Gordon
12	48	James Hylton	Chevrolet	James Hylton
13	90	Dick Brooks	Ford	Junie Donlavey
14	60	Jackie Rogers	Chevrolet	Lou Viglione
15	81	Terry Ryan	Chevrolet	Bill Monaghan
16	05	David Sisco	Chevrolet	David Sisco
17	47	Bruce Hill	Chevrolet	Bruce Hill
18	79	Frank Warren	Dodge	Frank Warren
19	3	Richard Childress	Chevrolet	Richard Childress
20	14	Coo Coo Marlin	Chevrolet	H.B. Cunningham

== Results ==
POS	ST	#	DRIVER	SPONSOR / OWNER	CAR	LAPS	MONEY	STATUS	LED	PTS
1	8	21	David Pearson	Purolator (Wood Brothers)	Mercury	200	15845	running	24	180
2	6	11	Cale Yarborough	Holly Farms (Junior Johnson)	Chevrolet	200	11845	running	129	180
3	2	2	Bobby Allison	CAM 2 (Roger Penske)	Mercury	200	9275	running	4	170
4	1	43	Richard Petty	STP (Petty Enterprises)	Dodge	200	9065	running	3	165
5	3	15	Buddy Baker	Norris Industries (Bud Moore)	Ford	199	6630	running	20	160
6	13	90	Dick Brooks	Truxmore (Junie Donlavey)	Ford	197	3035	running	0	150
7	7	54	Lennie Pond	Pepsi-Cola (Ronnie Elder)	Chevrolet	196	2725	running	0	146
8	16	05	David Sisco	David Sisco	Chevrolet	196	2615	running	0	142
9	14	60	Jackie Rogers	Red Dog's (Lou Viglione)	Chevrolet	194	1845	running	2	143
10	11	24	Cecil Gordon	Pruette (Cecil Gordon)	Chevrolet	193	2405	running	0	134
11	31	67	Buddy Arrington	Buddy Arrington	Dodge	191	2295	running	0	130
12	24	40	D.K. Ulrich	Garden State Auto (J.R. DeLotto)	Chevrolet	190	2185	running	0	127
13	20	14	Coo Coo Marlin	Cunningham-Kelley (H.B. Cunningham)	Chevrolet	189	1920	engine	0	124
14	33	25	Dick May	Don Robertson	Chevrolet	188	1835	running	0	121
15	32	30	Tighe Scott	Clyde Lynn (Walter Ballard)	Chevrolet	187	1720	running	0	118
16	26	70	J.D. McDuffie	Butler's (J.D. McDuffie)	Chevrolet	184	1540	running	0	115
17	28	8	Ed Negre	Ed Negre	Dodge	181	1515	running	0	112
18	19	3	Richard Childress	Kansas Jack (Richard Childress)	Chevrolet	180	1490	running	0	109
19	5	72	Benny Parsons	King's Row Fireplace (L.G. DeWitt)	Chevrolet	179	3965	running	0	106
20	22	92	Skip Manning	Stratagraph (Billy Hagan)	Chevrolet	161	940	engine	0	103
21	27	64	Tommy Gale	Stamey's Bar-B-Q (Elmo Langley)	Ford	145	1415	engine	0	100
22	30	46	Travis Tiller	Little B / C & K Coal (Travis Tiller)	Dodge	134	890	overheating	0	97
23	9	52	Jimmy Means	Means Racing (Bill Gray)	Chevrolet	132	865	engine	0	94
24	18	79	Frank Warren	Native Tan (Frank Warren)	Dodge	108	1340	wheel bearing	0	91
25	17	47	Bruce Hill	Howson Algraphy (Bruce Hill)	Chevrolet	103	1315	engine	0	88
26	29	36	Bobby Wawak	J & B Corvette (John Gwinn)	Chevrolet	57	790	engine	0	85
27	36	95	Gary Myers	Hicks Pharmacy (Junior Miller)	Chevrolet	49	765	engine	0	82
28	21	10	Bill Elliott	Sunny King (Bill Champion)	Ford	46	1240	engine	0	79
29	10	88	Darrell Waltrip	Gatorade (DiGard Racing)	Chevrolet	33	3725	engine	0	76
30	4	71	Dave Marcis	K & K Insurance (Nord Krauskopf)	Dodge	26	3830	engine	18	78
31	25	29	Walter Ballard	Velvet Touch Furniture (Bill Hollar)	Chevrolet	26	690	engine	0	70
32	15	81	Terry Ryan	WAM Racing (Bill Monaghan)	Chevrolet	20	680	engine	0	67
33	23	19	Henley Gray	Belden Asphalt (Henley Gray)	Chevrolet	20	670	ignition	0	64
34	35	01	Earle Canavan	Benihana (Earle Canavan)	Dodge	15	660	transmission	0	61
35	12	48	James Hylton	Hylton Engineering (James Hylton)	Chevrolet	2	1150	transmission	0	58
36	34	18	Joe Frasson	Excuse Lounge (Joe Frasson)	Chevrolet	1	640	engine	0	55

== Standings after the race ==
Pos	Driver	Points	Differential
1 ▲	Cale Yarborough	2318	0
2 ▼	Benny Parsons	2267	-51
3	Richard Petty	2201	-117
4	Bobby Allison	2161	-157
5 ▲	Lennie Pond	1964	-354
6 ▼	Dave Marcis	1905	-413
7	Richard Childress	1867	-451
8 ▲	Buddy Baker	1823	-495
9 ▲	David Pearson	1743	-575
10 ▼	Darrell Waltrip	1740	-578

Preceded by 1975	Motor State 400/Cam 2 Motor Oil 400 races 1976	Succeeded by 1977

Preceded by 1976 Riverside 400	NASCAR Winston Cup Season; 1976	Succeeded by 1976 Firecracker 400
