= 1976 Firecracker 400 =

Auto race held at Daytona International Speedway in 1976

Race details
- Race 16 of 30 in the 1976 NASCAR Winston Cup Series season
- The official program of the 1976 Firecracker 400 NASCAR Winston Cup Series race.
- Date: July 4, 1976
- Official name: Firecracker 400
- Location: Daytona International Speedway, Daytona Beach, Florida
- Course: Permanent racing facility
- Course length: 2.500 miles (4.023 km)
- Distance: 160 laps, 400 mi (643 km)
- Weather: Hot with temperatures up to 91.0 °F (32.8 °C); wind speeds up to 12 miles per hour (19 km/h)
- Average speed: 160.966 miles per hour (259.050 km/h)
- Attendance: 50,000

Pole position
Driver	A. J. Foyt	Ellington Racing

Most laps led
Driver	Cale Yarborough	Junior Johnson & Associates
- Laps: 71

Winner
No. 11	Cale Yarborough	Junior Johnson & Associates

Television in the United States
- Network: ABC (tape delay)
- Announcers: Keith Jackson

Cover of a brochure for the 1976 Firecracker 400.

The 1976 Firecracker 400 was a NASCAR Winston Cup Series race that took place on July 4, 1976, at Daytona International Speedway in Daytona Beach, Florida. Ticket prices for this race ranged from $8 ($45.26 when adjusted for inflation) to $30 ($169.74 when adjusted for inflation).

== Race report ==
There were 40 drivers on the grid; all were American-born males except for Janet Guthrie. Buddy Arrington was first out due to ignition troubles before the start of the first lap out of the 160 laps. A. J. Foyt won the pole position with a speed of 183.090 miles per hour (294.655 km/h) while the average speed of the race was 160.966 miles per hour (259.050 km/h).

Cale Yarborough defeated David Pearson by eight seconds in front of an audience of 40,000 people. Two cautions (for 14 laps) and 41 different lead changes made the race two hours and twenty-nine minutes long. The green flag was waved at 10:00 A.M.

The winner of the race received $22,215 ($125,690.13 when adjusted for inflation) while the last place finisher went home with $1,310 ($7,411.84 when adjusted for inflation). Notable crew chiefs for this race included Billy Hagan, Junie Donlavey, Buddy Parrott, Jake Elder, Harry Hyde, Dale Inman, Bud Moore, Sterling Marlin, Herb Nab and Tim Brewer.

The race was run on America's 200th birthday and was the site of Dick Skillen's best career finish of 17th. This race was the first career finish for Bill Elliott.

Buck and Buddy Baker both exited the race on lap 32, as the 57-year-old elder champion made his final Daytona start.

=== Qualifying ===
Grid	No.	Driver	Manufacturer	Owner
1	28	A.J. Foyt	Chevrolet	Hoss Ellington
2	11	Cale Yarborough	Chevrolet	Junior Johnson
3	43	Richard Petty	Dodge	Petty Enterprises
4	2	Bobby Allison	Mercury	Roger Penske
5	72	Benny Parsons	Chevrolet	L.G. DeWitt
6	71	Dave Marcis	Dodge	Nord Krauskopf
7	21	David Pearson	Mercury	Wood Brothers
8	14	Coo Coo Marlin	Chevrolet	H.B. Cunningham
9	41	Grant Adcox	Chevrolet	Herb Adcox
10	48	James Hylton	Chevrolet	James Hylton

Failed to qualify: Sam Sommers (#27) and Jerry Mabie (#34)

== Finishing order ==
POS	ST	#	DRIVER	SPONSOR / OWNER	CAR	LAPS	MONEY	STATUS	LED	PTS
1	2	11	Cale Yarborough	Holly Farms (Junior Johnson)	Chevrolet	160	22215	running	71	185
2	7	21	David Pearson	Purolator (Wood Brothers)	Mercury	160	13615	running	1	175
3	4	2	Bobby Allison	CAM 2 (Roger Penske)	Mercury	160	13245	running	64	170
4	1	28	A.J. Foyt	Gilmore (Hoss Ellington)	Chevrolet	159	7440	running	6	
5	6	71	Dave Marcis	K & K Insurance (Nord Krauskopf)	Dodge	157	7810	running	0	155
6	8	14	Coo Coo Marlin	Cunningham-Kelley (H.B. Cunningham)	Chevrolet	157	6300	running	0	150
7	5	72	Benny Parsons	King's Row Fireplace (L.G. DeWitt)	Chevrolet	156	6630	running	0	146
8	30	90	Dick Brooks	Truxmore (Junie Donlavey)	Ford	156	5170	running	0	142
9	15	05	David Sisco	David Sisco	Chevrolet	153	4660	running	1	143
10	22	22	Ricky Rudd	Al Rudd Auto Parts (Al Rudd)	Chevrolet	152	2590	running	0	134
11	29	52	Jimmy Means	Howard's Machine Shop (Bill Gray)	Chevrolet	149	2390	running	0	130
12	34	3	Richard Childress	Kansas Jack (Richard Childress)	Chevrolet	148	4150	running	0	127
13	20	79	Frank Warren	Native Tan (Frank Warren)	Dodge	148	3940	running	0	124
14	28	36	Bobby Wawak	J & B Corvette (John Gwinn)	Chevrolet	148	2115	running	0	121
15	33	68	Janet Guthrie	Kelly Services (Lynda Ferreri)	Chevrolet	147	1570	running	0	
16	36	40	D.K. Ulrich	Garden State Auto (J.R. DeLotto)	Chevrolet	144	3530	running	0	115
17	31	78	Dick Skillen	Goffco (Tom Goff)	Chevrolet	143	1790	running	0	112
18	39	91	Harold Miller	Bartow Paving (Harold Miller)	Chevrolet	142	1690	running	0	109
19	38	10	Bill Elliott	Sunny King (Bill Champion)	Ford	141	3070	running	0	106
20	21	77	Johnny Rutherford	Hy Gain (Johnny Ray)	Chevrolet	139	1740	rear end	0	
21	25	26	Jimmy Lee Capps	Sellers Automotive (David Lee Sellers)	Chevrolet	132	1290	running	0	100
22	3	43	Richard Petty	STP (Petty Enterprises)	Dodge	126	5960	engine	1	102
23	32	61	Joe Mihalic	Lou Viglione	Chevrolet	125	1140	running	0	94
24	23	70	J.D. McDuffie	Butler's (J.D. McDuffie)	Chevrolet	122	2390	engine	0	91
25	13	47	Bruce Hill	Howson Algraphy (Bruce Hill)	Chevrolet	110	1990	driveshaft	0	88
26	10	48	James Hylton	Hylton Engineering (James Hylton)	Chevrolet	102	1815	engine	2	90
27	40	25	Dick May	Don Robertson	Chevrolet	81	1540	rear end	0	82
28	26	82	Ferrel Harris	Rossmeyer (Ferrel Harris)	Dodge	75	1015	rear end	0	79
29	18	19	Tommy Gale	Belden Asphalt (Henley Gray)	Chevrolet	70	990	electrical	0	76
30	9	41	Grant Adcox	Adcox-Kirby (Herb Adcox)	Chevrolet	67	965	engine	0	73
31	35	92	Skip Manning	Stratagraph (Billy Hagan)	Chevrolet	60	940	electrical	0	70
32	14	54	Lennie Pond	Pepsi-Cola (Ronnie Elder)	Chevrolet	48	1415	engine	0	67
33	11	12	Neil Bonnett	Hawaiian Tropic (Neil Bonnett)	Chevrolet	39	890	wheel bearing	0	64
34	16	24	Cecil Gordon	Burger King (Cecil Gordon)	Chevrolet	33	1360	crash	0	61
35	12	15	Buddy Baker	Norris Industries (Bud Moore)	Ford	32	3835	engine	14	63
36	24	18	Buck Baker	Excuse Lounge (Joe Frasson)	Chevrolet	32	830	crash	0	55
37	37	7	Ed Negre	Dean Dalton	Chevrolet	16	825	electrical	0	52
38	19	60	Jackie Rogers	Red Dog's (Lou Viglione)	Chevrolet	13	820	overheating	0	49
39	17	88	Darrell Waltrip	Gatorade (DiGard Racing)	Chevrolet	9	3815	engine	0	46
40	27	67	Buddy Arrington	Sub-Tropic (Buddy Arrington)	Dodge	0	1310	ignition	0	43
Failed to qualify
POS	NAME	NBR	SPONSOR	OWNER	CAR					
	Sam Sommers	27	M.C. Anderson Racing	M.C. Anderson	Chevrolet					
	Jerry Mabie	34	J-2 Racing	Jerry Mabie	Chevrolet					

== Standings after the race ==
Pos	Driver	Points	Differential
1	Cale Yarborough	2503	0
2	Benny Parsons	2413	-90
3 ▲	Bobby Allison	2331	-172
4 ▼	Richard Petty	2303	-200
5 ▲	Dave Marcis	2060	-443
6 ▼	Lennie Pond	2031	-472
7	Richard Childress	1994	-509
8 ▲	David Pearson	1918	-585
9 ▼	Buddy Baker	1886	-617
10 ▲	Frank Warren	1798	-705

Preceded by 1976 Cam 2 Motor Oil 400	NASCAR Winston Cup Season; 1976	Succeeded by 1976 Nashville 420

Preceded by 1975	Firecracker 400 races 1976	Succeeded by 1977
