= 1976 Winston 500 =

Auto race held at Talladega Superspeedway in 1976

Race details
- Race 10 of 30 in the 1976 NASCAR Winston Cup Series season
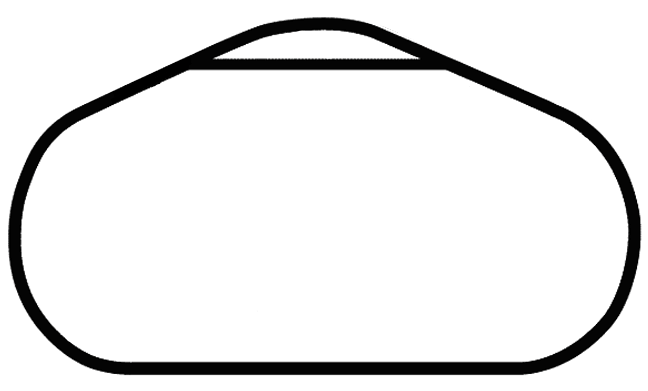
- Layout of Talladega Superspeedway
- Date: May 2, 1976
- Official name: Winston 500
- Location: Alabama International Motor Speedway, Talladega, Alabama
- Course: Permanent racing facility
- Course length: 4.280 km (2.660 miles)
- Distance: 188 laps, 500.1 mi (804.8 km)
- Weather: Mild with temperatures of 73.9 °F (23.3 °C); wind speeds of 11.8 miles per hour (19.0 km/h)
- Average speed: 169.887 miles per hour (273.407 km/h)
- Attendance: 80,000

Pole position
Driver	Dave Marcis	K&K Insurance Racing

Most laps led
Driver	Buddy Baker	Bud Moore Engineering
- Laps: 135

Winner
No. 15	Buddy Baker	Bud Moore Engineering

Television in the United States
- Network: CBS
- Announcers: Ken Squier

The 1976 Winston 500 was a NASCAR Winston Cup Series race that took place on May 2, 1976, at Alabama International Motor Speedway (now Talladega Superspeedway) in Talladega, Alabama.

Coo Coo Marlin had a serious crash the weekend before while attempting a qualifying run for the ARCA race and was unable to compete in any of the weekend's competition due to a shoulder injury.

== Background ==
Talladega Superspeedway, originally known as Alabama International Motor Superspeedway (AIMS), is a motorsports complex located north of Talladega, Alabama. It is located on the former Anniston Air Force Base in the small city of Lincoln. The track is a Tri-oval and was constructed by International Speedway Corporation, a business controlled by the France Family, in the 1960s. Talladega is most known for its steep banking and the unique location of the start/finish line - located just past the exit to pit road. The track currently hosts the NASCAR series such as the Sprint Cup Series, Xfinity Series, and the Camping World Truck Series. Talladega Superspeedway is the longest NASCAR oval with a length of 2.66 miles (4.28 km), and the track at its peak had a seating capacity of 175,000 spectators.

== Race report ==
Dave Marcis won the pole position for the race with a lap of 189.197 miles per hour (304.483 km/h). 40 cars started the race. Buddy Baker defeated Cale Yarborough by 35 seconds, in an average speed of 167.887 miles per hour (270.188 km/h). His record of winning three races in a row at Talladega would not be broken until 2002 when Dale Earnhardt Jr. recorded his fourth consecutive victory at that track. There were 24 different leaders and three cautions for 14 laps. Attendance was 80,000. This apparently was the first time that a 500 mile race had been completed in under three hours; roughly comparable to a two-and-a-half hour National Basketball Association game or a two-hour Major League Soccer game that is quickly-paced and is based mostly on skill.

Baker had qualified 12th, and two days before the race Bud Moore's team transported the engine for the team's 1976 Ford Torino back to their shop in Spartanburg, SC for examination. The engine was brought back to Talladega the day before the race.

Through his second-place finish, Yarborough managed to take the lead in championship points over Benny Parsons; who finished in 26th place during this event. Parsons was eliminated when Dick Brooks spun out of the lead group and was hit by David Pearson, Marcis, and Parsons. Petty finished fourth after losing a lap when he stalled out his car on pit road. Terry Ryan scores his best career finish with a fifth in just his second career start.

Prize winnings for this race varied from $25,285 for the winner ($139,718 when considering inflation) all the way to $1,205 for last-place finisher Darrell Bryant ($6,659 when considering inflation).

=== Qualifying ===
Grid	No.	Driver	Manufacturer	Owner
1	71	Dave Marcis	Dodge	Nord Krauskopf
2	43	Richard Petty	Dodge	Petty Enterprises
3	28	Donnie Allison	Chevrolet	Hoss Ellington
4	72	Benny Parsons	Chevrolet	L.G. DeWitt
5	11	Cale Yarborough	Chevrolet	Junior Johnson
6	88	Darrell Waltrip	Chevrolet	DiGard Racing
7	48	James Hylton	Chevrolet	James Hylton
8	12	Neil Bonnett	Chevrolet	Neil Bonnett
9	81	Terry Ryan	Chevrolet	Bill Monaghan
10	21	David Pearson	Mercury	Wood Brothers
11	2	Bobby Allison	Mercury	Roger Penske
12	15	Buddy Baker	Ford	Bud Moore
13	90	Dick Brooks	Ford	Junie Donlavey
14	79	Frank Warren	Dodge	Frank Warren
15	05	David Sisco	Chevrolet	David Sisco
16	3	Richard Childress	Chevrolet	Richard Childress
17	18	Joe Frasson	Chevrolet	Joe Frasson
18	24	Cecil Gordon	Chevrolet	Cecil Gordon
19	41	Grant Adcox	Chevrolet	Herb Adcox
20	22	Ricky Rudd	Chevrolet	Al Rudd
21	92	Skip Manning	Chevrolet	Billy Hagan
22	67	Buddy Arrington	Dodge	Buddy Arrington
23	33	Buck Baker	Chevrolet	Hiram Handy
24	19	Ed Negre	Chevrolet	Henley Gray
25	30	Tighe Scott	Chevrolet	Walter Ballard

== Top 10 finishers ==
Section reference:

1. Buddy Baker (No. 15), with an official time of 2:56:37
2. Cale Yarborough (No. 11), 35 seconds down
3. Bobby Allison (No. 2), 1 lap down
4. Richard Petty (No. 43), 2 laps down
5. Terry Ryan (No. 81), 4 laps down
6. Cecil Gordon (No. 24), 4 laps down
7. Donnie Allison (No. 28), 4 laps down
8. Bruce Hill (No. 47), 6 laps down
9. Dave Marcis (No. 71), 6 laps down
10. Frank Warren (No. 79), 8 laps down

== Standings after the race ==
Pos	Driver	Points	Differential
1 ▲	Cale Yarborough	1535	0
2 ▼	Benny Parsons	1486	-49
3	Richard Petty	1398	-137
4 ▲	Bobby Allison	1331	-204
5 ▲	Dave Marcis	1291	-244
5	Lennie Pond	1291	-244
7 ▼	Richard Childress	1270	-265
8	Darrell Waltrip	1179	-356
9 ▲	Cecil Gordon	1155	-380
10 ▼	J.D. McDuffie	1115	-420

Preceded by 1976 Virginia 500	NASCAR Winston Cup Season; 1976	Succeeded by 1976 Music City USA 420
Preceded by 1975 Winston 500	Talladega spring race 1976	Succeeded by 1977 Winston 500
