= Skip Manning =

American racing driver (born 1945)

- Born: April 23, 1945 (age 81); Bogalusa, Louisiana, U.S.
- Awards: 1976 Winston Cup Series Rookie of the Year

NASCAR Cup Series career
- 79 races run over 5 years
- Best finish: 14th (1977)
- First race: 1975 Atlanta 500 (Atlanta)
- Last race: 1979 World 600 (Charlotte)
| Wins | Top tens | Poles |
|---|---|---|
| 0 | 16 | 0 |
- Statistics up to date as of November 24, 2012.

Skip Manning (born April 23, 1945) is an American former NASCAR driver from Bogalusa, Louisiana. He competed in 79 Winston Cup events in his career, spanning from 1975 to 1979. He won the rookie-of-the-year award in 1976. He had sixteen top-ten finishes during his career, with a best finish of third at Talladega Superspeedway in 1977.

After retiring from NASCAR racing, Manning returned to his hometown of Bogalusa with his wife Gloria.
