= Roland Wlodyka =

American racing driver (1938–2020)

- Born: Roland Leonard Wlodyka; October 15, 1938; Boston, Massachusetts, U.S.
- Died: January 30, 2020 (aged 81); Lake Wylie, South Carolina, U.S.

NASCAR Cup Series career
- 11 races run over 2 years
- Best finish: 44th (1978)
- First race: 1977 Cam 2 Motor Oil 400 (Michigan)
- Last race: 1978 World 600 (Charlotte)
Wins	Top tens	Poles
0	0	0

Roland Leonard Wlodyka (October 15, 1938 – January 30, 2020) was an American stock car racing driver and mechanic, driving in the NASCAR Winston Cup Series in the 1970s and later serving as crew chief in the Cup and Craftsman Truck Series in the 1980s and 1990s.

== Racing career ==
Wlodyka quit drag racing to begin oval track competition in 1970. By the beginning of the 1977 season, Wlodyka had joined Rod Osterlund to drive in the NASCAR Winston Cup Series. By May 1978, he had given up the driver's seat after 11 races to take on his new role of team manager of Osterlund Racing, while Dave Marcis finished out the 1978 season behind the wheel. For the 1979 season, Wlodyka hired Dale Earnhardt who drove for Osterlund until the conclusion of the 1981 season. In the late 1980s, Wlodyka served as a part-time crew chief in the Cup Series, working with Buddy Baker, Rodney Combs and Hut Stricklin. In the late 1990s, Wlodyka crew chiefed in the NASCAR Craftsman Truck Series, working for Akins-Sutton Motorsports, Circle Bar Racing, Liberty Racing and Phelon Motorsports, working with future Cup champion Kevin Harvick while at Liberty.

== Death ==
Wlodyka died in Lake Wylie, South Carolina on January 30, 2020.

== Motorsports career results ==
=== NASCAR ===
(key) (Bold – Pole position awarded by qualifying time. Italics – Pole position earned by points standings or practice time. * – Most laps led.)

==== Winston Cup Series ====
NASCAR Winston Cup Series results
Year	Team	No.	Make	1	2	3	4	5	6	7	8	9	10	11	12	13	14	15	16	17	18	19	20	21	22	23	24	25	26	27	28	29	30	NWCC	Pts	Ref
1977	Osterlund Racing	91	Chevy	RSD	DAY	RCH	CAR	ATL	NWS	DAR	BRI	MAR	TAL	NSV	DOV	CLT	RSD	MCH; 29	DAY	NSV														64th	219	
1977	Osterlund Racing	98	Chevy																		POC; 31	TAL	MCH	BRI	DAR; 36	RCH	DOV	MAR	NWS	CLT; 39	CAR	ATL	ONT; 15	64th	219	
1978	Osterlund Racing	98	Chevy	RSD; DNQ		RCH; 26	CAR; 32	ATL; 18	BRI; 27	DAR	NWS	MAR	TAL	DOV	CLT; 21	NSV	RSD	MCH	DAY	NSV	POC	TAL	MCH	BRI	DAR	RCH	DOV	MAR	NWS	CLT	CAR	ATL	ONT	44th	549	
1978	Osterlund Racing	98	Buick		DAY; 19																													44th	549	
