= Bruce Hill (racing driver) =

American racing driver (1949–2017)

- Born: July 9, 1949; Topeka, Kansas, U.S.
- Died: May 14, 2017 (aged 67); Topeka, Kansas, U.S.
- Cause of death: Esophageal cancer
- Achievements: 1975 NASCAR Winston Cup Series Rookie of the Year

NASCAR Cup Series career
- 100 races run over 8 years
- Best finish: 16th (1975)
- First race: 1974 Los Angeles Times 500 (Ontario)
- Last race: 1981 Champion Spark Plug 400 (Michigan)
Wins	Top tens	Poles
0	21	0
- Statistics up to date as of January 27, 2011.

Bruce Hill (July 9, 1949 – May 14, 2017) was an American stock car racing driver from Topeka, Kansas. He competed in the Winston Cup Series, ARCA, and in the NASCAR West Series. He also competed in late model races around his hometown later in life.

== Personal life ==
Hill was born on July 9, 1949, in Topeka, Kansas, and graduated from Shawnee Heights High School. He resided in and around the Topeka metropolitan area his later years of life, raising American Quarter Horses. Hill died on May 14, 2017, due to issues with esophageal cancer.

== NASCAR career ==
In 1974, Hill began racing in NASCAR in the Winston Cup Series and the NASCAR West Series. He only competed in one race in both series the same year. The race in 1974 was the only race Hill would run in the West series.

One year later, Hill won the Rookie of the Year award in the Winston Cup Series. During that season, he competed in all but four of the season's thirty races. Among his highlights were top-five finishes at Rockingham Speedway, Darlington Raceway and Dover International Speedway. Still running as an independent driver, Hill returned to the series again in 1976, competing in 22 events, which he recorded only four top-ten finishes and finished 23rd in the standings. In 1977, Hill was able to record four top-tens and a 29th place finish in points after participating in sixteen events. During the following year, he only participated in fourteen events, and recorded two top-tens with a 32nd place finish in the point standings, but benefited form teaming up with Harry Clary to field cars.

For 1979, Hill teamed up with fellow owner-driver Walter Ballard for a limited slate of events. He finished 34th in points after running seven races. Continuing to race for Ballard in 1980, he finished fiftieth in points, and only competed in six races. In his final year in the Winston Cup Series, he competed in eight races and finished 43rd in points. Also in 1981, he participated in a NASCAR Late Model Sportsman race at Darlington Raceway.

== Other racing ==
While competing in the Winston Cup Series, Hill also participated in the ARCA Racing Series as well as in USAC. In 2002, he participated in a Late model race at Thunderhill Speedway in Mayetta, Kansas.

== Motorsports results ==
=== NASCAR ===
(key) (Bold – Pole position awarded by qualifying time. Italics – Pole position earned by points standings or practice time. * – Most laps led.)

==== Winston Cup Series ====
NASCAR Winston Cup Series results
Year	Team	No.	Make	1	2	3	4	5	6	7	8	9	10	11	12	13	14	15	16	17	18	19	20	21	22	23	24	25	26	27	28	29	30	31	NWCC	Pts	Ref
1974	Hill Racing	47W	Chevy	RSD	DAY	RCH	CAR	BRI	ATL	DAR	NWS	MAR	TAL	NSV	DOV	CLT	RSD	MCH	DAY	BRI	NSV	ATL	POC	TAL	MCH	DAR	RCH	DOV	NWS	MAR	CLT	CAR	ONT; 13		101st	1.575	
1975	Hill Racing	47	Chevy	RSD	DAY; 32	RCH; 11	CAR; 5	BRI	ATL; 23	NWS; 16	DAR; 15	MAR	TAL; 47	NSV; 23	DOV; 8	CLT; 18	RSD	MCH; 30	DAY; 7	NSV; 13	POC; 8	TAL; 31	MCH; 8	DAR; 5	DOV; 5	NWS; 10	MAR; 25	CLT; 27	RCH; 8	CAR; 6	BRI; 10	ATL; 13	ONT; 26		16th	3002	
1976	Hill Racing	47	Chevy	RSD	DAY; 36	CAR; 22	RCH	BRI			DAR; DNQ	MAR; 7	TAL; 8	NSV; 23	DOV; 39	CLT; 37	RSD	MCH; 25	DAY; 25	NSV; 27	POC; 29	TAL; 32	MCH; 19	BRI	DAR; 22	RCH	DOV; 36	MAR; 30	NWS	CLT; 34	CAR; 35	ATL; 11	ONT; 10		23rd	1995	
1976	Ballard Racing	30	Chevy						ATL; 18	NWS	DAR; 10																								23rd	1995	
1977	Hill Racing	47	Chevy	RSD	DAY; 25	RCH	CAR; 36	ATL; 10	NWS	DAR; 10	BRI	MAR; 7	TAL; 27	NSV	DOV; 35	CLT; 31	RSD	MCH; 32	DAY; 30	NSV	POC	TAL; 35	MCH; 13	BRI	DAR; 9	RCH	DOV	MAR	NWS	CLT; 41	CAR; 26	ATL; 15	ONT		29th	1213	
1978	Harry Clary	05	Olds	RSD	DAY; DNQ	RCH	CAR	ATL; 9	BRI	DAR	NWS	MAR	TAL; 36	DOV; 19	CLT; 10	NSV; 25	RSD	MCH; 29	DAY; 40	NSV; 14	POC; 17	TAL; 35	MCH; 34	BRI	DAR; 40	RCH	DOV	MAR	NWS	CLT; 13	CAR	ATL; 36	ONT; DNQ		32nd	1214	
1979	Ballard Racing	50	Olds	RSD	DAY; 19	CAR	RCH	ATL; 15	NWS	BRI	DAR	MAR	TAL; DNQ	NSV	DOV								TAL; 16	MCH	BRI	DAR	RCH	DOV	MAR	CLT	NWS	CAR	ATL	ONT; 15	34th	594	
1979	Ballard Racing	50	Buick													CLT; 24	TWS; 15	RSD	MCH	DAY; 41	NSV	POC													34th	594	
1980	Ballard Racing	50	Olds	RSD	DAY; 33	RCH	CAR	ATL; 27	BRI	DAR	NWS	MAR	TAL; 36	NSV	DOV	CLT; 38	TWS	RSD	MCH	DAY; 35	NSV	POC	TAL; 41	MCH	BRI	DAR	RCH	DOV	NWS	MAR	CLT	CAR	ATL	ONT	50th	348	
1981	Nelson Malloch	7	Buick	RSD	DAY; 39	RCH	CAR																												43rd	596	
1981	Hill Racing	7	Buick					ATL; 23																											43rd	596	
1981	Hill Racing	50	Buick						BRI; 26	NWS	DAR	MAR	TAL; 28	NSV	DOV	CLT; 41	TWS	RSD	MCH	DAY; 16	NSV	POC	TAL; 30	MCH; 33	BRI	DAR	RCH	DOV	MAR	NWS	CLT	CAR	ATL; DNQ	RSD	43rd	596	

===== Daytona 500 =====
Year	Team	Manufacturer	Start	Finish
1975	Hill Racing	Chevrolet	20	32
1976	Hill Racing	Chevrolet	33	36
1977	Hill Racing	Chevrolet	18	25
1978	Harry Clary	Oldsmobile	DNQ	
1979	Ballard Racing	Chevrolet	17	19
1980	Ballard Racing	Oldsmobile	35	33
1981	Nelson Malloch	Buick	24	39
