= Tighe Scott =

American racecar driver (born 1949)

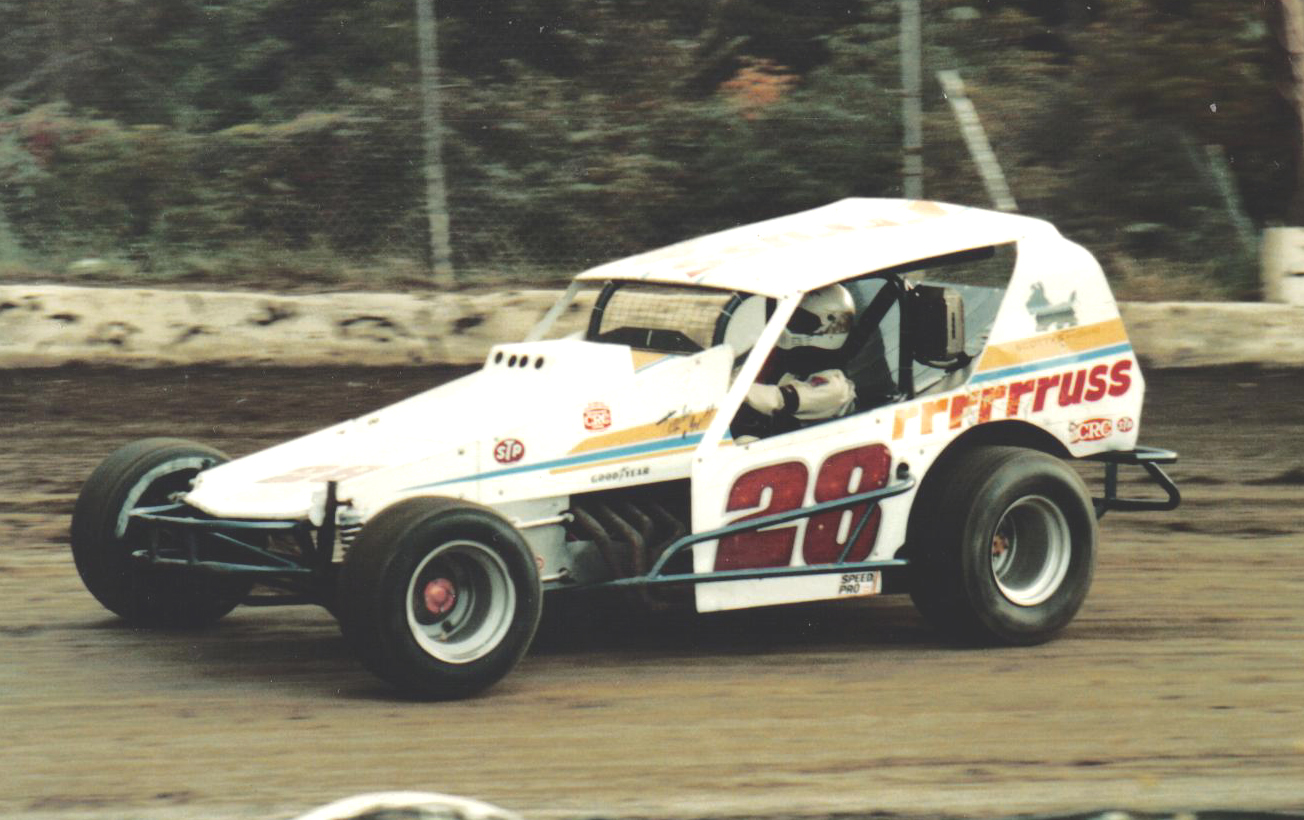
- Scott in his modified
- Born: 2 June 1949 (age 77); Pen Argyl, Pennsylvania, U.S.

NASCAR Cup Series career
- 89 races run over 6 years
- Best finish: 13th (1978)
- First race: 1976 Daytona 500 (Daytona)
- Last race: 1982 Daytona 500 (Daytona)
Wins	Top tens	Poles
0	18	0

Tighe Scott (born 2 June 1949) is an American retired racecar driver from Pen Argyl, Pennsylvania. He competed in dirt modified racing before moving up into the NASCAR Winston Cup Series. He had eighteen top-ten finishes in 89 races, with a career best thirteenth-place finish in the 1978 Winston Cup.

== Racing career ==
Scott began as a dirt modified and sportsman driver at tracks in Pennsylvania, New York, and New Jersey, including in Bridgeport, New Jersey and Middletown, New York.

Scott was given the opportunity to race in the 1976 Daytona 500 by car owner Walter Ballard. He started eighteenth in the race and finished 35th after crashing on the 58th lap. Scott described the experience, "That was the first time I had ever raced on asphalt. My first time on the track, I had no idea what I was up against. It took me a couple days to get myself up to speed." He competed in five more NASCAR races that season. After a sixth-place finish at Talladega Superspeedway, Ballard offered him a full-time ride.

Scott ran 26 of 30 races that season to finish 20th in season points. In 1978, Scott had his highest points finish when he finished 13th in season points.

Scott's father, owner of Scotty's Fashions, hired Harry Hyde to be the crew chief for his family team in 1979 with Tighe Scott as the driver. Their first race together was for the 1979 Daytona 500. Scott blew a tire in his 125 mile qualifying race, so he had to start 33rd in the main event. He worked his way into the top-five in the race. "I was with guys I had never run alongside of before," Scott said. "Our car didn’t have the horsepower they had. I couldn’t lead, but I could run good in the draft." Scott was in third place in the race when he went into the pits for his final pit stop with 30 laps left. He entered the pits at full speed (which was legal and common at that time), and spun from some water on pit row right before his pit stall. Benny Parsons' car was overheating in the pits. It took Scott some time to refire the car and he returned to the track 3/4 of a lap behind the leaders. He was unable to draft with any cars and he went a lap down with one lap left. Richard Petty won the race after the crash between Donnie Allison and Cale Yarborough led to a fight in the infield. Scott finished sixth in the race. At the following race at Rockingham Speedway, Scott recorded his best NASCAR result when he finished fourth. His team's lack of funds enabled them to race in only 15 more events that season.

Scott ran ten races in 1980. Scott's final race was at the 1982 Daytona 500 for Tom Pistone. He started 30th and finished 29th after crashing on the 81st lap. The crash footage was featured in the movie Stroker Ace.

Scott returned to his roots, racing sprint cars on Pennsylvania and New York tracks. In 1983, he raced sprint cars at Williams Grove Speedway and Selinsgrove Speedway, and won a race at Selinsgrove. The following season he raced at these and other tracks including Port Royal Speedway and a World of Outlaws (WoO) event at Orange County Fair Speedway. His final race happened in 1985. That season he competed in four WoO events and won his second last feature in a local event at Williams Grove.

== Personal life ==
As of 2008, Scott runs the construction and excavating business A. Scott Enterprises. He also operates "Scotty's Fashions", a family garment business started by his father. He is married to his second wife, the former Kathy Toman, and he has three sons and four grandchildren.

On June 5, 2024, Scott was arrested and charged with two felony offenses, including obstruction of law enforcement during a civil disorder and assaulting, resisting, or impeding officers, plus five misdemeanors, allegedly committed during the breach of the U.S. Capitol on January 6, 2021. On January 20, 2025, the first day of the second presidency of Donald Trump, Scott and his son were pardoned along with nearly every other participant in the Capitol attack.

== Motorsports results ==
=== NASCAR ===
(key) (Bold – Pole position awarded by qualifying time. Italics – Pole position earned by points standings or practice time. * – Most laps led.)

==== Winston Cup Series ====
NASCAR Winston Cup Series results
Year	Team	No.	Make	1	2	3	4	5	6	7	8	9	10	11	12	13	14	15	16	17	18	19	20	21	22	23	24	25	26	27	28	29	30	31	NWCC	Pts	Ref
1976	Ballard Racing	30	Chevy	RSD	DAY; 35	CAR	RCH	BRI	ATL	NWS	DAR	MAR	TAL; 17	NSV	DOV	CLT	RSD	MCH; 15	DAY	NSV	POC; 30	TAL; 6	MCH; 36	BRI	DAR	RCH	DOV	MAR	NWS	CLT	CAR	ATL	ONT		45th	566	
1977	Ballard Racing	30	Chevy	RSD; DNQ	DAY; 16	RCH; 11	CAR; 30	ATL; 25	NWS; 23		BRI; 28	MAR; 14	TAL; 17	NSV	DOV; 14	CLT; 16	RSD	MCH; 31	DAY; 27	NSV; 13	POC; 13	TAL; 27	MCH; 11	BRI; 5	DAR; 32	RCH; 18	DOV; 24	MAR; 20	NWS	CLT; 25	CAR; 34	ATL; 19	ONT; 17		20th	2628	
1977	Baxter Price	45	Chevy							DAR; 26																									20th	2628	
1978	Ballard Racing	30	Chevy	RSD; 18		RCH; 10	CAR; 34		BRI; 9	DAR; 34	NWS; 25	MAR; 25		DOV; 11		NSV; 7	RSD; 11			NSV; 22	POC; 8		MCH; 19	BRI; 23	DAR; 23	RCH; 27	DOV; 25	MAR; 29	NWS; 10	CLT; 12	CAR; 21		ONT; DNQ		13th	3110	
1978	Ballard Racing	30	Olds		DAY; 11			ATL; 34					TAL; 13		CLT; 31			MCH; 11	DAY; 10			TAL; 10										ATL; 22			13th	3110	
1979	Ballard Racing	30	Buick	RSD	DAY; 6	CAR; 4	RCH	ATL; 37	NWS	BRI	DAR	MAR; 13	TAL; 34	NSV	DOV; 24	CLT; 16	TWS	RSD	MCH; 9	DAY; 14	NSV	POC; 10	TAL; 6	MCH; 8	BRI	DAR; 35	RCH	DOV; 10	MAR	CLT; 13	NWS	CAR; 37	ATL; 29	ONT	27th	1879	
1980	Ballard Racing	30	Buick	RSD	DAY; 39	RCH	CAR; 37	ATL; 32	BRI	DAR	NWS	MAR																							39th	791	
1980	Ballard Racing	30	Olds										TAL; 5	NSV		CLT; 36	TWS	RSD		DAY; 36	NSV		TAL; 34	MCH	BRI	DAR	RCH	DOV	NWS	MAR	CLT	CAR	ATL	ONT	39th	791	
1980	Ballard Racing	30	Chevy												DOV; 23				MCH; 10			POC; 32													39th	791	
1982	Tom Pistone	59	Buick	DAY; 29	RCH	BRI	ATL	CAR	DAR	NWS	MAR	TAL	NSV	DOV	CLT	POC	RSD	MCH	DAY	NSV	POC	TAL	MCH	BRI	DAR	RCH	DOV	NWS	CLT	MAR	CAR	ATL	RSD		118th	0	

===== Daytona 500 =====
Year	Team	Manufacturer	Start	Finish
1976	Ballard Racing	Chevrolet	18	35
1977	Ballard Racing	Chevrolet	35	16
1978	Ballard Racing	Oldsmobile	11	11
1979	Ballard Racing	Buick	33	6
1980	Ballard Racing	Buick	16	39
1982	Tom Pistone	Buick	30	29

== See also ==
- List of cases of the January 6 United States Capitol attack (M-S)
- Criminal proceedings in the January 6 United States Capitol attack
- List of people granted executive clemency in the second Trump presidency
