= 1977 NAPA National 500 =

Auto race held at Charlotte Motor Speedway in 1977

Race details
- Race 27 of 30 in the 1977 NASCAR Winston Cup Series season
- Layout of Charlotte Motor Speedway
- Date: October 9, 1977
- Official name: NAPA National 600
- Location: Charlotte Motor Speedway, Concord, North Carolina
- Course: Permanent racing facility
- Course length: 1.500 miles (2.414 km)
- Distance: 334 laps, 500 mi (865 km)
- Weather: Mild with temperatures of 78.1 °F (25.6 °C); wind speeds of 14 miles per hour (23 km/h)
- Average speed: 142.780 miles per hour (229.782 km/h)
- Attendance: 79,400

Pole position
Driver	David Pearson	Wood Brothers Racing

Most laps led
Driver	Benny Parsons	DeWitt Racing
- Laps: 250

Winner
No. 72	Benny Parsons	DeWitt Racing

Television in the United States
- Network: ABC
- Announcers: Al Michaels; Chris Economaki

The 1977 NAPA National 500 was a NASCAR Winston Cup Series racing event that was held on October 9, 1977, at Charlotte Motor Speedway in Concord, North Carolina.

== Race report ==
41 drivers competed at this event. Benny Parsons defeated Cale Yarborough by 19.2 seconds in front of 79,400 spectators. Parsons scored a dominant Winston Cup victory, in terms of percentage of laps led. There were 18 lead changes and four cautions; the race lasted three hours and thirty minutes. Bruce Hill received the last-place finish due to engine problems on lap 15 of this 334-lap race. David Pearson would win the pole position with a qualifying speed of 160.982 miles per hour (259.075 km/h) while the average race speed was 142.780 miles per hour (229.782 km/h). By all evidence, this would be the last win for a Chevrolet Laguna in NASCAR Cup Series history.

His next pole position would come at the 1978 World 600 where he would get his 10th consecutive pole position start at Charlotte Motor Speedway. Pearson's final pole position at Charlotte Motor Speedway would come at the 1978 NAPA National 500 - setting a record. Other notable drivers at this event included: Bill Elliott, Janet Guthrie, Neil Bonnett, A. J. Foyt, Dick Brooks, Darrell Waltrip, and Buddy Baker. Tom Sneva would make his NASCAR debut at this racing event. Dale Earnhardt would start his only race in 1977 driving for Henley Gray.

Individual earnings for each driver ranged from the winner's share of $41,075 ($218,232 when adjusted for inflation) to the last-place finisher's share of $820 ($4,357 when adjusted for inflation). The total prize purse for this event was $223,530 ($1,187,618 when adjusted for inflation).

=== Qualifying ===
Grid	No.	Driver	Manufacturer	Speed	Qualifying time	Owner
1	21	David Pearson	Mercury	160.982	33.544	Wood Brothers
2	11	Cale Yarborough	Chevrolet	159.848	33.782	Junior Johnson
3	1	Donnie Allison	Chevrolet	159.848	33.782	Hoss Ellington
4	15	Buddy Baker	Ford	159.773	33.798	Bud Moore
5	43	Richard Petty	Dodge	159.363	33.885	Petty Enterprises
6	88	Darrell Waltrip	Chevrolet	158.810	34.003	DiGard Racing
7	5	Neil Bonnett	Dodge	158.753	34.015	Jim Stacy
8	72	Benny Parsons	Chevrolet	158.735	34.019	L.G. DeWitt
9	51	A.J. Foyt	Chevrolet	158.158	34.143	A.J. Foyt
10	92	Skip Manning	Chevrolet	158.094	34.157	Billy Hagan

== Finishing order ==
Section reference:

1. Benny Parsons†
2. Cale Yarborough†
3. David Pearson†
4. Buddy Baker†
5. Darrell Waltrip
6. Dick Brooks†
7. A.J. Foyt
8. Neil Bonnett†
9. Janet Guthrie
10. Bill Elliott
11. Ron Hutcherson
12. Coo Coo Marlin†
13. Dick May†
14. James Hylton†
15. J.D. McDuffie†
16. Richard Childress
17. Buddy Arrington†
18. G.C. Spencer†
19. D.K. Ulrich
20. Peter Knab
21. Tommy Gale†
22. Ed Negre†
23. Dave Marcis*
24. Ricky Rudd
25. Tighe Scott*
26. Bobby Allison*
27. Tom Sneva*
28. Jimmy Means*
29. Dick Trickle*
30. Lennie Pond*
31. Butch Hartman*†
32. Richard Petty*
33. Frank Warren*
34. Sam Sommers*
35. Skip Manning*
36. Donnie Allison*
37. Cecil Gordon*†
38. Dale Earnhardt*†
39. Roland Wlodyka*
40. Jim Raptis*
41. Bruce Hill*†

* Driver failed to finish race
† signifies that the driver is known to be deceased

== Standings after the race ==
Pos	Driver	Points	Differential
1	Cale Yarborough	4505	0
2 ▲	Benny Parsons	4127	-378
3 ▼	Richard Petty	4109	-396
4	Darrell Waltrip	4067	-438
5	Buddy Baker	3579	-926
6	Dick Brooks	3380	-1125
7 ▲	James Hylton	3124	-1381
8 ▼	Richard Childress	3120	-1385
9	Cecil Gordon	3030	-1475
10	Bobby Allison	3028	-1477

Preceded by 1977 Wilkes 400	NASCAR Winston Cup Season; 1977	Succeeded by 1977 American 500

Preceded by 1976	National 500/NAPA National 500 races 1977	Succeeded by 1978
