= 1978 World 600 =

Auto race held at Charlotte Motor Speedway in 1978

Race details
- Race 12 of 30 in the 1978 NASCAR Winston Cup Series season
- Layout of Charlotte Motor Speedway
- Date: May 28, 1978
- Official name: World 600
- Location: Charlotte Motor Speedway, Concord, North Carolina
- Course: Permanent racing facility
- Course length: 1.500 miles (2.414 km)
- Distance: 400 laps, 600 mi (965 km)
- Weather: Temperatures of 84.9 °F (29.4 °C); wind speeds of 8 miles per hour (13 km/h)
- Average speed: 138.355 miles per hour (222.661 km/h)
- Attendance: 125,000

Pole position
Driver	David Pearson	Wood Brothers Racing

Most laps led
Driver	Darrell Waltrip	DiGard Motorsports
- Laps: 144

Winner
No. 88	Darrell Waltrip	DiGard Motorsports

Television in the United States
- Network: CBS
- Announcers: Ken Squier

The 1978 World 600, the 19th running of the event, was a NASCAR Winston Cup Series racing event that was held on May 28, 1978, at Charlotte Motor Speedway in Concord, North Carolina.

== Race report ==
Zsa Zsa Gabor served as the celebrity grand marshall. There were 40 drivers on the starting grid. An audience of 125,000 fans would see 43 lead changes along with 32 laps under a caution flag. The entire race from green flag to checkered flag lasted for four hours and twenty minutes.

During the first 100 laps, David Pearson, Darrell Waltrip, and Donnie Allison were fighting for the lead. The final laps would become a battle between Donnie Allison, Darrell Waltrip, and Benny Parsons. Waltrip would eventually defeat Donnie Allison by two seconds in his 1978 Chevrolet Monte Carlo. Joining him on victory lane would be his wife Stevie. Jerry Jolly would be the last-place finisher due to problems with his suspension on lap 20. The lowest driver to actually finish the race was D.K. Ulrich.

After the race, Cale Yarborough would only be 30 points behind Benny Parsons in the overall championship standings. The number of points for Dale Earnhardt and Ron Hutcherson were never recorded. Earnhardt was given the #98 car ride when Willy T. Ribbs was arrested for reckless driving and fired. Ribbs had qualified the vehicle in 28th place but Earnhardt would finish the race in 17th place.

The entire prize purse for this race was $310,491 ($1,532,653 when adjusted for inflation); Waltrip received $48,608 ($239,940 when adjusted for inflation) while Jerry Jolly took home $1,090 ($5,380 when adjusted for inflation).

Roland Wlodyka would end his professional driving career with the NASCAR Cup Series after the end of this racing event.

=== Racial controversy ===
Willy T. Ribbs was expected to be at this NASCAR Cup Series event, being a popular African-American race car driver of the time. After failing to appear at two special practice sessions, he was sacked and replaced with then-obscure driver Dale Earnhardt; who back then specialized in short track racing and was not yet a serious championship contender. Many traditionalists chided the opportunities that Ribbs received, such as entering higher levels of NASCAR simply because he was black.

== Qualifying ==
Grid	No.	Driver	Manufacturer	Speed	Owner
1	21	David Pearson	Mercury	160.551	Wood Brothers
2	11	Cale Yarborough	Oldsmobile	159.736	Junior Johnson
3	2	Dave Marcis	Chevrolet	159.432	Rod Osterlund
4	12	Harry Gant	Chevrolet	159.040	Kennie Childers
5	90	Dick Brooks	Ford	158.936	Junie Donlavey
6	15	Bobby Allison	Ford	158.801	Bud Moore
7	14	Sterling Marlin	Chevrolet	158.548	H.B. Cunningham
8	48	Al Holbert	Oldsmobile	158.431	James Hylton
9	54	Lennie Pond	Oldsmobile	158.306	Harry Ranier
10	27	Buddy Baker	Chevrolet	158.058	M.C. Anderson

== Finishing order ==
Section reference:

1. Darrell Waltrip
2. Donnie Allison
3. Bobby Allison
4. Cale Yarborough
5. David Pearson
6. Benny Parsons
7. Buddy Baker
8. Richard Petty
9. Sterling Marlin
10. Bruce Hill
11. Grant Adcox
12. Morgan Shepherd
13. Dick May
14. Bill Elliott
15. Buddy Arrington
16. John Utsman
17. Dale Earnhardt
18. Gary Myers
19. Dick Brooks
20. Richard Childress
21. Roland Wlodyka
22. J.D. McDuffie
23. Frank Warren
24. Tommy Gale
25. Baxter Price
26. Skip Manning
27. Jim Vandiver*
28. Ricky Rudd
29. D.K. Ulrich
30. Ronnie Thomas*
31. Tighe Scott*
32. Dave Marcis*
33. Lennie Pond*
34. Connie Saylor*
35. Neil Bonnett*
36. Harry Gant*
37. Jimmy Means*
38. Al Holbert*
39. Ron Hutcherson*
40. Jerry Jolly*

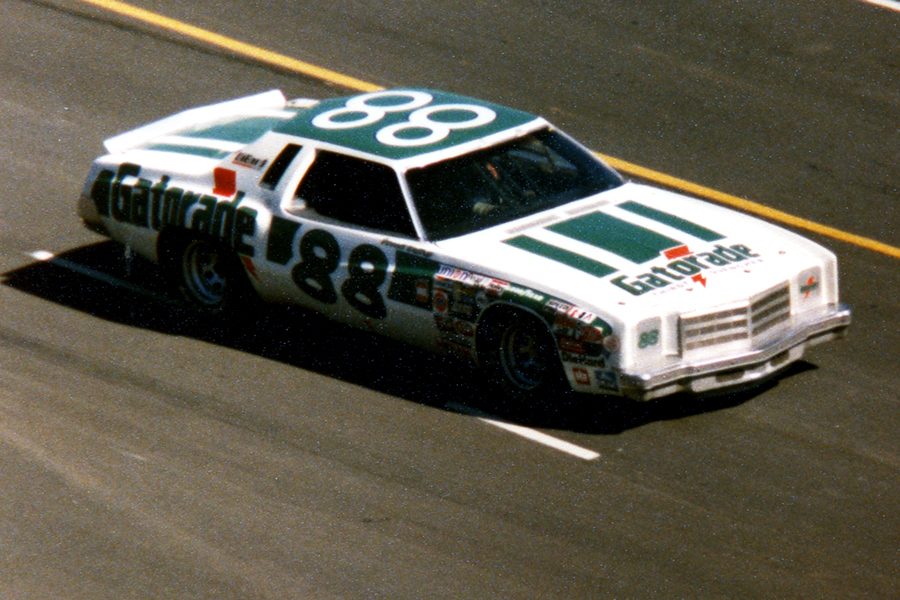
Darrell Waltrip at the 1978 World 600. He won the race.

* Driver failed to finish race

== Timeline ==
Section reference:

- Start of race: David Pearson had the advantage over all the other drivers as the green flag was waved.
- Lap 20: Problems with the vehicle's suspension forced Jerry Jolly into becoming the last-place finisher.
- Lap 117: Caution due to a four-car accident on turn two; caution ended on lap 129.
- Lap 129: The vehicle's throttle was dying, Jimmy Means had to exit the event early.
- Lap 140: Harry Gant managed to overheat his racing vehicle after racing at high speeds.
- Lap 157: Neil Bonnett overheated his vehicle's engine and had to leave the race.
- Lap 184: Connie Saylor actually overheated his engine after racing for so long.
- Lap 198: The vehicle's engine could not stand any more high speed racing, forcing Dave Marcis out of the race.
- Lap 207: Lennie Pond had a terminal crash.
- Lap 308: Tighe Scott had a rough time with his vehicle's engine and had to accept a 31st-place finish.
- Lap 318: The steering on Ronnie Thomas's vehicle wasn't raceworthy anymore, ending his day on the track.
- Lap 343: Engine problems forced Jim Vandiver to be the final DNF of the race.
- Lap 368: Caution due to debris on turn four; caution ended on lap 371.
- Lap 396: Dale Earnhardt managed to spin his vehicle, caution ended on lap 398.
- Lap 400: David Pearson and Benny Parsons had an accident on turn two.
- Finish: Darrell Waltrip was officially declared the winner of the event.

== Standings after the race ==
Pos	Driver	Points	Differential
1	Benny Parsons	1862	0
2 ▲	Cale Yarborough	1832	-30
3 ▼	Dave Marcis	1738	-124
4	Darrell Waltrip	1683	-179
5 ▲	Bobby Allison	1665	-197
6 ▼	Lennie Pond	1562	-300
7 ▲	Richard Petty	1537	-325
8 ▼	Buddy Arrington	1527	-335
9	Skip Manning	1455	-407
10	Richard Childress	1444	-418

Preceded by 1978 Mason-Dixon 500	NASCAR Winston Cup Season; 1978	Succeeded by 1978 Music City USA 420

Preceded by 1977	World 600 races 1978	Succeeded by 1979
