= 1978 Talladega 500 =

Auto race held at Alabama International Motor Speedway in 1978

Race details
- Race 19 of 30 in the 1978 NASCAR Winston Cup Series season
- Official poster for the 1978 Talladega 500
- Date: August 6, 1978
- Official name: Talladega 500
- Location: Alabama International Motor Speedway, Talladega, Alabama
- Course: Permanent racing facility
- Course length: 2.660 miles (4.280 km)
- Distance: 188 laps, 500.1 mi (804.8 km)
- Weather: Temperatures of 88.9 °F (31.6 °C); wind speeds of 6.6 miles per hour (10.6 km/h)
- Average speed: 174.7 miles per hour (281.2 km/h)
- Attendance: 60,000

Pole position
| Driver | Cale Yarborough | Junior Johnson & Associates |

Most laps led
| Driver | Cale Yarborough | Junior Johnson & Associates |
- Laps: 79

Winner
| No. 54 | Lennie Pond | Ranier Racing |

Television in the United States
- Network: CBS
- Announcers: Ken Squier; Lee Petty

The 1978 Talladega 500 was a NASCAR Winston Cup Series race that took place on August 6, 1978, at Alabama International Motor Speedway in Talladega, Alabama.

== Background ==
Talladega Superspeedway, originally known as Alabama International Motor Superspeedway (AIMS), is a motorsports complex located north of Talladega, Alabama. It is located on the former Anniston Air Force Base in the small city of Lincoln. The track is a Tri-oval and was constructed by International Speedway Corporation, a business controlled by the France Family, in the 1960s. Talladega is most known for its steep banking and the unique location of the start/finish line - located just past the exit to pit road. The track currently hosts the NASCAR series such as the Sprint Cup Series, Xfinity Series, and the Camping World Truck Series. Talladega Superspeedway is the longest NASCAR oval with a length of 2.66 miles (4.28 km), and the track at its peak had a seating capacity of 175,000 spectators.

== Race report ==
Four cautions were waved for 17 laps; making the race last almost three hours in length, with 67 lead changes the race. James Hylton finished last due to a transmission issue on the first lap of 188 laps. Lennie Pond became the third driver whose only career victory was at the summer Talladega race (Richard Brickhouse in 1969 and Dick Brooks in 1973). He would defeat Donnie Allison by two car lengths in front of 60,000 spectators. Yarborough lost half a lap near the end of the race, losing the leaders because he missed the pit entry and made his stop on lap 181.

There was 1 foreigner in the 41-car lineup: Claude Ballot-Léna from Paris, France. Cale Yarborough would earn the pole position with a speed of 192.717 miles per hour (310.148 km/h) while the average speed of the race was 174.7 miles per hour (281.2 km/h). It was a 500 mile world's record in 1978. Bill Elliott would break that record at the 1985 Winston 500 with an average of 186.288 miles per hour (299.801 km/h). Female driver Janet Guthrie was also a part of the grid; finishing in 29th place due to a crash on lap 129. Country music star and part-time NASCAR driver Marty Robbins made his only start of the season and came home 18th driving his Dodge Magnum.

Richard Petty would stop racing in Chrysler cars after this race. Only the 1984 Winston 500 would see more lead changes than this event.

=== Qualifying ===
| Grid | No. | Driver | Manufacturer | Speed | Qualifying time | Owner |
|---|---|---|---|---|---|---|
| 1 | 11 | Cale Yarborough | Oldsmobile | 192.917 | 49.638 | Junior Johnson |
| 2 | 72 | Benny Parsons | Oldsmobile | 192.104 | 49.848 | L.G. DeWitt |
| 3 | 21 | David Pearson | Mercury | 192.027 | 49.868 | Wood Brothers |
| 4 | 27 | Buddy Baker | Oldsmobile | 191.570 | 49.987 | M.C. Anderson |
| 5 | 54 | Lennie Pond | Oldsmobile | 191.023 | 50.130 | Harry Ranier |
| 6 | 43 | Richard Petty | Dodge | 190.177 | 50.353 | Petty Enterprises |
| 7 | 22 | Ricky Rudd | Chevrolet | 189.823 | 50.447 | Al Rudd |
| 8 | 14 | Coo Coo Marlin | Chevrolet | 189.070 | 50.648 | H.B. Cunningham |
| 9 | 1 | Donnie Allison | Oldsmobile | 188.969 | 50.675 | Hoss Ellington |
| 10 | 92 | Skip Manning | Buick | 188.939 | 50.683 | Billy Hagan |

== Finishing order ==
Section reference:

1. Lennie Pond
2. Donnie Allison
3. Benny Parsons
4. Cale Yarborough
5. David Pearson
6. Bobby Allison
7. Richard Petty
8. Neil Bonnett
9. Dick Brooks
10. Tighe Scott
11. Ferrell Harris
12. Dale Earnhardt
13. Bill Elliott
14. Dave Marcis
15. Buddy Arrington
16. Dick May
17. J.D. McDuffie
18. Marty Robbins
19. D.K. Ulrich
20. Tommy Gale
21. Gary Myers
22. Grant Adcox
23. Baxter Price
24. Ronnie Thomas
25. Richard Childress
26. Coo Coo Marlin
27. Steve Moore
28. Buddy Baker
29. Janet Guthrie
30. Al Holbert
31. Earle Canavan
32. Jimmy Means
33. Frank Warren
34. Darrell Waltrip
35. Bruce Hill
36. Roger Hamby
37. Claude Ballot-Lena
38. Skip Manning
39. Ricky Rudd
40. Blackie Wangerin
41. James Hylton

== Timeline ==
Section reference:

- Start: Cale Yarborough was leading the starting grid as the cars were approaching the start/finish line.
- Lap 9: Blackie Wangerin had some engine issues that forced him out of the event.
- Lap 22: Ricky Rudd had some engine issues that forced him out of the event.
- Lap 46: Skip Manning had some engine issues that forced him out of the event.
- Lap 48: Claude Ballot-Lena had some engine issues that forced him out of the event.
- Lap 94: Roger Hamby's vehicle had a clutch that went bad which caused him to exit the race.
- Lap 96: The axle on Bruce Hill's vehicle became unsafe for further racing.
- Lap 105: Darrell Waltrip had some engine issues that forced him out of the event.
- Lap 118: Jimmy Means had a terminal crash.
- Lap 124: Al Holbert had some engine issues that forced him out of the event.
- Lap 129: Janet Guthrie had a terminal crash.
- Lap 149: Buddy Baker had some engine issues that forced him out of the event.
- Lap 158: Coo Coo Marlin had some engine issues that forced him out of the event.
- Finish: Lennie Pond was officially declared the winner of the event.

== Standings after the race ==
| Pos | Driver | Points | Differential |
|---|---|---|---|
| 1 | Cale Yarborough | 2982 | 0 |
| 2 | Dave Marcis | 2824 | -158 |
| 3 | Benny Parsons | 2801 | -181 |
| 4 ▲ | Bobby Allison | 2579 | -403 |
| 5 ▼ | Darrell Waltrip | 2568 | -414 |
| 6 | Richard Petty | 2515 | -467 |
| 7 | Lennie Pond | 2391 | -591 |
| 8 | Buddy Arrington | 2328 | -654 |
| 9 | Richard Childress | 2278 | -704 |
| 10 | Dick Brooks | 2245 | -737 |

| Preceded by 1978 Coca-Cola 500 | NASCAR Winston Cup Series Season; 1978 | Succeeded by 1978 Champion Spark Plug 400 |

| Preceded by 1977 | Talladega 500 races 1978 | Succeeded by 1979 |
