= Jim Stacy =

NASCAR team owner

- Born: March 27, 1930; Charlotte, North Carolina, U.S.
- Died: October 12, 2016 (aged 86); Los Angeles, California, U.S.
- Occupation: NASCAR car owner
- Known for: Being a NASCAR car owner during the vintage years of NASCAR. Buying or sponsoring as many as 7 teams in any given race.

James D. Stacy (March 27, 1930 – October 12, 2016), frequently referred to as Jim Stacy or J.D. Stacy, was an American entrepreneur and former NASCAR Winston Cup Series race car owner and sponsor whose career spanned 1977 to 1983. His first race as an owner was the 1977 Firecracker 400 while his final race as an owner was at the 1983 Winston Western 500. As a team owner, Stacy employed veteran NASCAR drivers such as Neil Bonnett, Ferrel Harris, Sterling Marlin, Joe Ruttman, Tim Richmond, and Dale Earnhardt. Stacy's vehicles participated in 126 races with four wins, 21 finishes in the top-five, and 53 finishes in the top-ten. His cars led 1,097 laps out of 30,307 – for a total of 38,263.6 miles (61,579.3 km).

== Summary ==
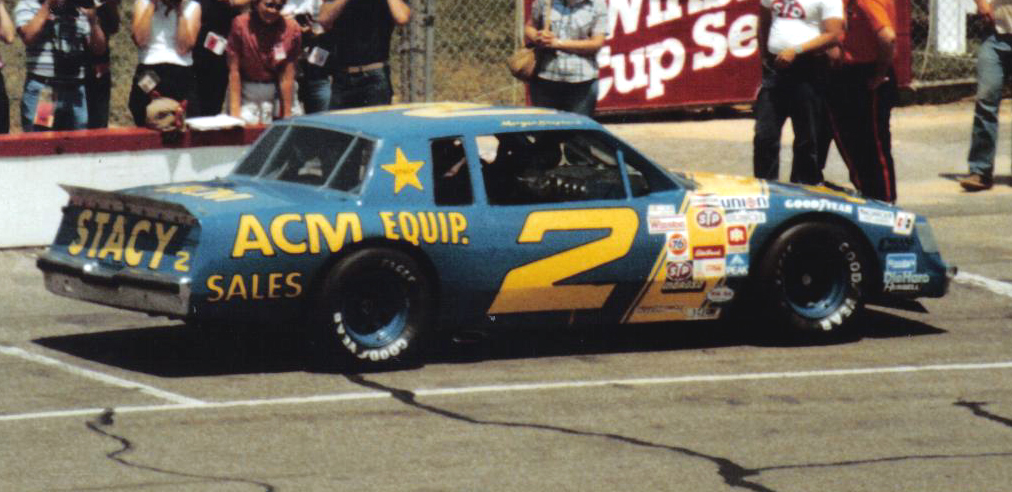
The Stacy-owned No. 2 driven by Morgan Shepherd in 1983.

Stacy was a native of Kentucky. He dropped out of school in the eighth grade. He founded a construction company in 1951. Stacy made his fortune in the coal mining industry. Among Stacy's interests included business in the Netherlands with the Rijn-Schelde-Verolme shipbuilding company, manufacturing thin-seam coal mining machines. Stacy also produced Stacy-Pak multivitamins.

In May 1977, Stacy purchased the former K&K Insurance team from Nord Krauskopf. He was convinced to purchase the team by its crew chief Harry Hyde, a friend and former Stacy employee. Stacy inherited the team's driver Neil Bonnett, with the team changing numbers from 71 to 5. Bonnett would score the first two victories of his career that year. The second of those victories, at Ontario Motor Speedway, would be the last NASCAR Cup victory for a Chrysler vehicle until Dodge reentered the series in 2001. The team expanded to a second team in 1978, but went winless and was dissolved by the beginning of the 1979 season. Stacy would later be sued by Hyde and Ferrel Harris, one of the drivers of the second team car. During the lawsuit, Stacy was also a target of an assassination attempt involving a car bomb, although he escaped the attack.

In July 1981, Stacy purchased Rod Osterlund's No. 2 team, which fielded Dale Earnhardt. Stacy proceeded to hire Joe Ruttman as a second driver, and planned to expand the team to five entries by 1982, calling the operation "The 5 Racers". Earnhardt would have a falling out with Jim Stacy after four races, and would leave for Richard Childress Racing. Stacy made headlines in early 1982, when he sponsored a total of seven entries in the 1982 Daytona 500, including his two team cars driven by Joe Ruttman and Jim Sauter. After five races, Ruttman was replaced in the No. 2 by Tim Richmond. Richmond scored two wins for the team, but left at the end of the season. For 1983, the team scaled back to one team, hiring Mark Martin to drive the No. 2 car. Martin was replaced by Morgan Shepherd after seven races. The team ended operations at the end of the season.

With an average start of 14th place and an average finish of 17th place, Stacy's cars finished near the middle of the pack. His career winnings as a NASCAR owner were $927,815 ($2,999,201.51 when adjusted for inflation); putting him below the millionaire status of most NASCAR drivers and owners.

Following the end of his NASCAR career, Stacy purchased several dirt tracks in the Southeastern United States.
