= 1978 Delaware 500 =

Auto race held at Dover International Speedway in 1978

Race details
- Race 24 of 30 in the 1978 NASCAR Winston Cup Series season
- Layout of Dover International Speedway
- Date: September 17, 1978
- Official name: Delaware 500
- Location: Dover Downs International Speedway, Dover, Delaware
- Course: Permanent racing facility
- Course length: 1.000 miles (1.609 km)
- Distance: 500 laps, 500.0 mi (804.6 km)
- Weather: Warm with temperatures of 79 °F (26 °C); wind speeds of 9.9 miles per hour (15.9 km/h)
- Average speed: 119.323 miles per hour (192.032 km/h)

Pole position
Driver	J.D. McDuffie	McDuffie Racing
- Time: 26.572

Most laps led
Driver	Bobby Allison	Bud Moore Engineering
- Laps: 267

Winner
No. 15	Bobby Allison	Bud Moore Engineering

Television in the United States
- Network: untelevised
- Announcers: none

The 1978 Delaware 500 was a NASCAR Winston Cup Series racing event that took place on September 17, 1978, at Dover Downs International Speedway (now Dover International Speedway) in Dover, Delaware.

== Background ==
Dover Downs International Speedway, now called Dover International Speedway, is one of five short tracks to hold NASCAR races; the others are Bristol Motor Speedway, Richmond International Raceway, Martinsville Speedway, and Phoenix International Raceway. The NASCAR race makes use of the track's standard configuration, a four-turn short track oval that is 1 mile (1.6 km) long. The track's turns are banked at twenty-four degrees, and both the front stretch (the location of the finish line) and the backstretch are banked at nine degrees.

== Race report ==
Five hundred laps were completed on the paved oval track spanning 1.000 mile (1.609 km). The race took four hours, eleven minutes, and twenty seconds to complete. Three cautions slowed the race for eighteen laps. Thirty thousand fans attended. Notable speeds were: 119.323 miles per hour (192.032 km/h) for the average speed and 135.480 miles per hour (218.034 km/h) for the pole position speed (accomplished by J.D. McDuffie).

Bobby Allison defeated Cale Yarborough by 11 1/2 seconds. J.D. McDuffie won his only NASCAR Cup pole position while using tires from the McCreary Tire Company. This pole position also secured a spot in the first running of the Busch Clash (now the Sprint Unlimited); Buddy Baker would ultimately win that race in February 1979.

Jabe Thomas would retire from NASCAR after this race. Bobby Allison would gain his 50th career Winston Cup Series victory from this race. Although McDuffie would never win a Winston Cup Series race, his best overall finish would come at the 1979 Sun-Drop Music City USA 420 in Nashville, Tennessee.

Notable crew chiefs who participated in the race included Darrell Bryant, Junie Donlavey, Buddy Parrott, Jake Elder, Joey Arrington, Herb Nab, Dale Inman, Walter Ballard, Kirk Shelmerdine, and Bud Moore.

=== Qualifying ===
Grid	No.	Driver	Manufacturer	Speed	Qualifying time	Owner
1	70	J.D. McDuffie	Chevrolet	135.480	26.572	J.D. McDuffie
2	15	Bobby Allison	Ford	134.866	26.693	Bud Moore
3	3	Richard Childress	Oldsmobile	134.806	26.705	Richard Childress
4	5	Neil Bonnett	Oldsmobile	134.713	26.723	Rod Osterlund
5	21	David Pearson	Mercury	134.695	26.727	Wood Brothers
6	27	Buddy Baker	Chevrolet	134.468	26.772	M.C. Anderson
7	88	Darrell Waltrip	Chevrolet	134.393	26.787	DiGard
8	11	Cale Yarborough	Oldsmobile	134.353	26.795	Junior Johnson
9	72	Benny Parsons	Chevrolet	133.546	26.957	L.G. DeWitt
10	2	Dave Marcis	Chevrolet	133.298	27.007	Rod Osterlund

== Finishing order ==
Section reference:

1. Bobby Allison†
2. Cale Yarborough†
3. Buddy Baker†
4. David Pearson†
5. Darrell Waltrip
6. Dick Brooks†
7. Lennie Pond†
8. Dave Marcis
9. Donnie Allison
10. Dick May†
11. Ronnie Thomas
12. Richard Childress
13. Al Holbert†
14. Cecil Gordon†
15. Ed Negre†
16. Earle Canavan
17. Tommy Gale†
18. Roger Hamby
19. Nestor Peles
20. Gary Myers*
21. Frank Warren
22. Buddy Arrington
23. Baxter Price
24. Nelson Oswald*
25. Tighe Scott*
26. Benny Parsons*†
27. Richard Petty*
28. Dave Dion*
29. Neil Bonnett*†
30. Ralph Jones*
31. Joey Arrington*
32. Jimmy Means*
33. J.D. McDuffie*†
34. James Hylton*†
35. Louis Gatto*
36. Ferrel Harris*†
37. Jabe Thomas*†

* Driver failed to finish race
† signifies that the driver is known to be deceased

== Timeline ==
Section reference:

- Start of race: J.D. McDuffie had the pole position to start the event.
- Lap 3: Ferrel Thomas quit the race for unknown reasons.
- Lap 5: Louis Gatto was black flagged due to unsportsmanlike conduct.
- Lap 10: James Hylton quit the race for unknown reasons.
- Lap 11: Bobby Allison took over the lead from J.D. McDuffie.
- Lap 21: Cale Yarborough took over the lead from Bobby Allison.
- Lap 80: J.D. McDuffie blew his engine while driving at high speeds.
- Lap 98: Darrell Waltrip took over the lead from Cale Yarborough.
- Lap 99: Cale Yarborough took over the lead from Darrell Waltrip.
- Lap 110: Caution due to Nestor Peles spinning into turn two, ended on lap 112.
- Lap 140: Jimmy Means blew his engine while driving at high speeds.
- Lap 143: Joey Arrington managed to lose the rear end of his vehicle.
- Lap 213: Caution due to Ralph Jones' problematic engine, ended on lap 220.
- Lap 224: Caution due to an accident involving Neil Bonnett and four other drivers on turn three, ended on lap 230.
- Lap 238: Dave Dion blew his engine while driving at high speeds.
- Lap 243: Bobby Allison took over the lead from Cale Yarborough.
- Lap 269: The ignition on Richard Petty's vehicle stopped working, ending his day on the track.
- Lap 311: Benny Parsons blew his engine while driving at high speeds.
- Lap 318: Buddy Baker took over the lead from Bobby Allison.
- Lap 319: Bobby Allison took over the lead from Buddy Baker.
- Lap 320: The oil pan on Tighe Scott's vehicle developed some major issues.
- Lap 335: Nelson Oswald blew his engine while driving at high speeds.
- Lap 438: Gary Myers blew his engine while driving at high speeds.
- Finish: Bobby Allison was officially declared the winner of the event.

== Standings after the race ==
Pos	Driver	Points	Differential
1	Cale Yarborough	3867	0
2 ▲	Dave Marcis	3482	-385
3 ▼	Benny Parsons	3479	-388
4	Darrell Waltrip	3423	-444
5	Bobby Allison	3361	-506
6	Richard Petty	3156	-711
7	Lennie Pond	2986	-881
8 ▲	Dick Brooks	2948	-919
9 ▼	Buddy Arrington	2936	-931
10	Richard Childress	2843	-1024

Preceded by 1978 Capital City 400	NASCAR Winston Cup Series Season; 1978	Succeeded by 1978 Old Dominion 500
