= 1978 Capital City 400 =

Auto race held at Richmond Fairgrounds Raceway in 1978

Race details
- Race 23 of 30 in the 1978 NASCAR Winston Cup Series season
- Layout of Richmond Speedway
- Date: September 10, 1978
- Official name: Capital City 400
- Location: Richmond Fairgrounds Raceway, Richmond, Virginia
- Course: Permanent racing facility
- Course length: 0.542 miles (0.872 km)
- Distance: 400 laps, 216.8 mi (348.9 km)
- Weather: Extremely hot with temperatures up to 95 °F (35 °C); wind speeds up to 17.26 miles per hour (27.78 km/h)
- Average speed: 79.568 mph (128.052 km/h)
- Attendance: 18,000

Pole position
Driver	Darrell Waltrip	DiGard Motorsports

Most laps led
Driver	Neil Bonnett	Osterlund Motorsports
- Laps: 276

Winner
No. 5	Darrell Waltrip	DiGard Motorsports

Television in the United States
- Network: untelevised
- Announcers: none

The 1978 Capital City 400 was a NASCAR Winston Cup Series race that took place on September 10, 1978, at Richmond Fairgrounds Raceway (now Richmond Raceway) in Richmond, Virginia.

By 1980, NASCAR had completely stopped tracking the year model of all the vehicles and most teams did not take stock cars to the track under their own power anymore.

== Background ==
The track did not have an official name until 1969, when it was named the Fairgrounds Raceway. Its name would change to the Richmond International Raceway in 1988, and again in 2018, when it would be renamed to the Richmond Raceway, the name it now bears.

In 1953, Fairgrounds Raceway began hosting the Grand National Series with Lee Petty winning that first race in Richmond. The original track was paved in 1968. In 1988, the track was re-designed into its present D-shaped configuration.

== Race report ==
Four hundred laps were completed on an oval track spanning 0.546 miles (0.879 km) per lap for a grand total of 216.8 miles (348.9 km) of racing. The race was completed within two hours and forty-three minutes of the first official green flag of the race. Darrell Waltrip would end up defeating Bobby Allison (who drove a 1978 Ford Thunderbird) by only one second.

Neil Bonnett started chasing down Waltrip on the pit road and slammed into Waltrip's vehicle; creating a brutal race ending battle and forcing Bill France Jr. to put them on probation for the remainder of the year. The spectators were displeased after Darrell Waltrip's victory, so Waltrip needed police protection in order to make it to the post-race interviews.

When I passed Neil, I was on the inside and he was on the outside. It think it's pretty poor strategy when he doesn't move up. He actually cut into me.

— Darrell Waltrip

Eighteen thousand people attended the race. Five yellow flags were used in twenty-seven laps, and the lead swapped hands 16 times. The pole position speed was acquired by Darrell Waltrip's Chevrolet Monte Carlo with a qualifying speed of 91.964 miles per hour (148.002 km/h) during his solo run. Meanwhile, the average speed of the actual race would be 79.568 miles per hour (128.052 km/h).

Dave Dion had his best start of fourth place and had a fast car in the race until an incident took him out of the race on lap 85. Roger Hamby matched his best Cup finish of tenth place.

Notable crew chiefs for this race included Darrell Bryant, Junie Donlavey, Buddy Parrott, Jake Elder, Kirk Shelmerdine, Dale Inman, Bud Moore, and Tim Brewer.

Ed Negre would receive the last-place finish because of a brake problem acquired on lap 6 of the race. The top prize of the race was $13,800 ($68,120 adjusted for inflation) while last place awarded the driver with $300 ($1,481 when adjusted for inflation). Cale Yarborough would retain his lead in the championship points after this race. 30 drivers would attend this race; all of them were born in the United States of America.

=== Qualifying ===
Grid	No.	Driver	Manufacturer	Owner
1	88	Darrell Waltrip	Chevrolet	DiGard Racing
2	15	Bobby Allison	Ford	Bud Moore
3	5	Neil Bonnett	Chevrolet	Rod Osterlund
4	29	Dave Dion	Ford	Dave Dion
5	43	Richard Petty	Chevrolet	Petty Enterprises
6	72	Benny Parsons	Chevrolet	L.G. DeWitt
7	90	Dick Brooks	Ford	Junie Donlavey
8	48	James Hylton	Chevrolet	James Hylton
9	54	Lennie Pond	Chevrolet	Harry Ranier
10	11	Cale Yarborough	Oldsmobile	Junior Johnson
11	2	Dave Marcis	Chevrolet	Rod Osterlund
12	70	J.D. McDuffie	Chevrolet	J.D. McDuffie
13	92	Terry Labonte	Chevrolet	Billy Hagan
14	17	Roger Hamby	Chevrolet	Roger Hamby
15	3	Richard Childress	Oldsmobile	Richard Childress
16	30	Tighe Scott	Chevrolet	Walter Ballard
17	25	Ronnie Thomas	Chevrolet	Don Robertson
18	67	Buddy Arrington	Dodge	Buddy Arrington
19	4	Gary Myers	Chevrolet	Gary Myers
20	45	Baxter Price	Chevrolet	Baxter Price
21	52	Jimmy Means	Chevrolet	Jimmy Means
22	64	Tommy Gale	Ford	Elmo Langley
23	81	Ferrel Harris	Chevrolet	Robert Gee
24	1	Ed Negre	Chrysler	Ed Negre
25	24	Cecil Gordon	Chevrolet	Cecil Gordon

== Top 10 finishers ==
Pos	Grid	No.	Driver	Manufacturer	Laps	Laps led	Points	Time/Status
1	1	88	Darrell Waltrip	Chevrolet	400	65	180	2:43:19
2	2	15	Bobby Allison	Ford	400	44	175	+1 seconds
3	3	5	Neil Bonnett	Chevrolet	400	276	175	Lead lap under green flag
4	10	11	Cale Yarborough	Oldsmobile	399	0	160	+1 lap
5	7	90	Dick Brooks	Oldsmobile	397	0	155	+3 laps
6	6	72	Benny Parsons	Ford	397	0	150	+3 laps
7	13	92	Terry Labonte	Chevrolet	392	0	146	+8 laps
8	12	70	J.D. McDuffie	Chevrolet	391	0	142	+9 laps
9	11	2	Dave Marcis	Chevrolet	388	1	143	+12 laps
10	14	17	Roger Hamby	Chevrolet	388	0	134	+12 laps

== Timeline ==
Section reference:

- Start of race: Darrell Waltrip started the race with the pole position.
- Lap 6: Ed Negre abused his vehicle's brakes, causing him to exit the race prematurely.
- Lap 16: Wayne Morgan's vehicle overheated, causing him to leave the race.
- Lap 28: Ferrel Harris' vehicle also overheated, with the same consequences.
- Lap 49: Tighe Scott had a terminal crash, causing him to withdraw from the event.
- Lap 52: Dave Marcis gained the lead from Darrell Waltrip.
- Lap 53: Lennie Pond gained the lead from Dave Marcis.
- Lap 54: Neil Bonnett gained the lead from Lennie Pond.
- Lap 85: The rear end of Dave Dion's vehicle was unserviceable, causing him to leave the race.
- Lap 172: Nelson Oswald's vehicle overheated, ending his day on the track early.
- Lap 182: Darrell Waltrip gained the lead from Neil Bonnett.
- Lap 183: Bobby Allison gained the lead from Darrell Waltrip.
- Lap 184: Darrell Waltrip gained the lead from Bobby Allison.
- Lap 191: Neil Bonnett took over the lead from Darrell Waltrip.
- Lap 198: Tommy Gale's engine became problematic, causing him not to finish the race.
- Lap 256: Frank Warren's vehicle had some handling issues, ending his race prematurely.
- Lap 265: Richard Petty took over the lead from Neil Bonnett.
- Lap 266: Bobby Allison took over the lead from Richard Petty.
- Lap 267: Neil Bonnett took over the lead from Bobby Allison.
- Lap 274: Richard Petty took over the lead from Neil Bonnett.
- Lap 286: Neil Bonnett took over the lead from Richard Petty.
- Lap 343: Bobby Allison took over the lead from Neil Bonnett.
- Lap 356: Issues with his vehicle's rear end would make Richard Petty settle for a 20th place finish.
- Lap 385: Neil Bonnett took over the lead from Bobby Allison.
- Lap 395: Darrell Waltrip gained the lead from Neil Bonnett, making this the final lead change of the event.
- Finish: Darrell Waltrip won the race.

== Championship standings ==
Pos	Driver	Points	Differential
1	Cale Yarborough	3692	0
2	Benny Parsons	3394	-298
3	Dave Marcis	3340	-352
4	Darrell Waltrip	3263	-429
5	Bobby Allison	3176	-516
6	Richard Petty	3074	-618
7 ▲	Lennie Pond	2840	-852
8 ▼	Buddy Arrington	2839	-853
9	Dick Brooks	2798	-894
10	Richard Childress	2176	-976

Preceded by 1978 Southern 500	NASCAR Winston Cup Series Season; 1978	Succeeded by 1978 Delaware 500
