= 1979 Talladega 500 =

Auto race held at Alabama International Motor Speedway in 1979

Race details
- Race 20 of 31 in the 1979 NASCAR Winston Cup Series season
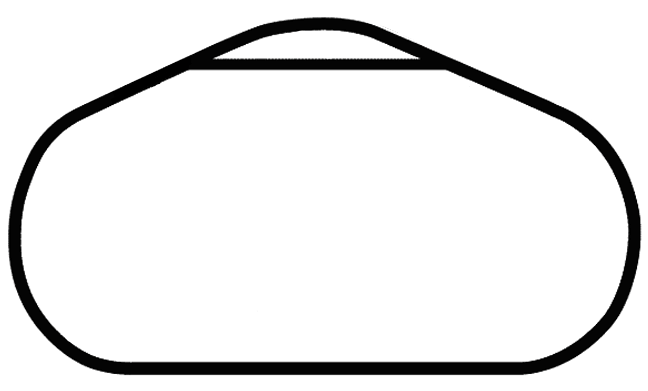
- Layout of Talladega Superspeedway
- Date: August 5, 1979
- Official name: Talladega 500
- Location: Alabama International Motor Speedway, Talladega, Alabama
- Course: Permanent racing facility
- Course length: 2.660 miles (4.280 km)
- Distance: 188 laps, 500.1 mi (804.8 km)
- Weather: Hot with temperatures of 90.9 °F (32.7 °C); wind speeds of 9.9 miles per hour (15.9 km/h)
- Average speed: 161.229 miles per hour (259.473 km/h)
- Attendance: 80,000

Pole position
Driver	Neil Bonnett	Wood Brothers Racing

Most laps led
Driver	Darrell Waltrip	DiGard Motorsports
- Laps: 102

Winner
No. 88	Darrell Waltrip	DiGard Motorsports

Television in the United States
- Network: CBS
- Announcers: Ken Squier; Lee Petty

Radio in the United States
- Radio: Motor Racing Network
- Booth announcers: Jack Arute and Barney Hall
- Turn announcers: Turns 1 & 2: Eli Gold; Backstreatch & Turn 3: Hal Hamrick; Turn 4 & Tri-Oval: Mike Joy; Pit Reporter: Darel Dieringer; Garage Area: Joe Alloy

The 1979 Talladega 500 was a NASCAR Winston Cup Series race that took place on August 5, 1979, at Alabama International Motor Speedway in Talladega, Alabama.

== Background ==
Talladega Superspeedway, originally known as Alabama International Motor Superspeedway (AIMS), is a motorsports complex located north of Talladega, Alabama. It is located on the former Anniston Air Force Base in the small city of Lincoln. The track is a Tri-oval and was constructed by International Speedway Corporation, a business controlled by the France Family, in the 1960s. Talladega is most known for its steep banking and the unique location of the start/finish line - located just past the exit to pit road. The track currently hosts the NASCAR series such as the Cup Series, Xfinity Series, and the Craftsman Truck Series. Talladega Superspeedway is the longest NASCAR oval with a length of 2.66 miles (4.28 km), and the track at its peak had a seating capacity of 175,000 spectators.

== Race report ==
There were 41 American-born drivers on the starting grid; 21 of them failed to finish the race. Most of the problems were engine failures. After 188 laps and five caution flags, Darrell Waltrip would defeat David Pearson by a minute and two seconds in front of a crowd of eighty thousand fans. After many lead changes, Waltrip lead the final 55 laps.

The race averaged 161.229 miles per hour (259.473 km/h) for the 500 miles while Neil Bonnett would earn his pole position in qualifying with a speed of 193.6 miles per hour (311.6 km/h). Kyle Petty would earn ninth place in his inaugural Winston Cup race after starting 18th. Bob Burcham and Al Holbert would make this race their individual swan songs. The total prize purse at this event was $205,680 ($891,091 when adjusted for inflation). While the winner would collect $32,325 of this purse ($140,045 when adjusted for inflation), the last-place finisher, Dick May, would collect $1,050 ($4,549 when adjusted for inflation).

Oldsmobile would rack up their 100th victory in the history of the NASCAR Cup Series.

=== Qualifying ===
Grid	No.	Driver	Manufacturer	Owner
1	21	Neil Bonnett	Mercury	Wood Brothers
2	2	David Pearson	Oldsmobile	Rod Osterlund
3	30	Tighe Scott	Buick	Walter Ballard
4	28	Buddy Baker	Oldsmobile	Harry Ranier
5	11	Cale Yarborough	Oldsmobile	Junior Johnson
6	67	Buddy Arrington	Dodge	Buddy Arrington
7	41	Grant Adcox	Oldsmobile	Herb Adcox
8	88	Darrell Waltrip	Oldsmobile	DiGard Racing
9	79	Frank Warren	Dodge	Frank Warren
10	50	Bruce Hill	Oldsmobile	Walter Ballard
11	90	Ricky Rudd	Mercury	Junie Donlavey
12	27	Benny Parsons	Oldsmobile	M.C. Anderson
13	43	Richard Petty	Oldsmobile	Petty Enterprises
14	71	Dave Marcis	Chevrolet	Dave Marcis
15	44	Terry Labonte	Buick	Billy Hagan
16	12	Jack Ingram	Oldsmobile	Kennie Childers
17	7	Al Holbert	Oldsmobile	Al Holbert
18	42	Kyle Petty	Dodge	Petty Enterprises
19	15	Bobby Allison	Ford	Bud Moore
20	3	Richard Childress	Oldsmobile	Richard Childress
21	47	Harry Gant	Oldsmobile	Jack Beebe
22	9	Bill Elliott	Mercury	George Elliott
23	1	Donnie Allison	Chevrolet	Hoss Ellington
24	05	Dick Brooks	Oldsmobile	Nelson Malloch
25	77	Jody Ridley	Mercury	Junie Donlavey

== Finishing order ==
Section reference:

1. Darrell Waltrip
2. David Pearson†
3. Ricky Rudd
4. Richard Petty
5. Jody Ridley
6. Tighe Scott
7. Harry Gant
8. Buddy Arrington†
9. Kyle Petty
10. Richard Childress
11. Dick Brooks†
12. Bill Elliott
13. Jimmy Means
14. Bob Burcham†
15. Rick Newsom†
16. Bruce Hill*†
17. Steve Moore†
18. J.D. McDuffie†
19. Grant Adcox†
20. James Hylton†
21. Benny Parsons*†
22. Ronnie Thomas*
23. Frank Warren†
24. Cale Yarborough*†
25. Joe Millikan*
26. Baxter Price*
27. D.K. Ulrich*
28. Bobby Allison*†
29. Coo Coo Marlin*†
30. Donnie Allison*
31. Dave Marcis*
32. Marty Robbins*†
33. Terry Labonte*
34. Neil Bonnett*†
35. Jack Ingram*†
36. Tommy Gale*†
37. Blackie Wangerin*†
38. Al Holbert*†
39. Buddy Baker*†
40. Cecil Gordon*†
41. Dick May*†

† signifies that the driver is known to be deceased
* Driver failed to finish race

== Standings after the race ==
Pos	Driver	Points	Differential
1	Darrell Waltrip	3246	0
2	Richard Petty	3017	-229
3	Cale Yarborough	2946	-300
4	Bobby Allison	2924	-322
5 ▲	Benny Parsons	2662	-584
6 ▼	Dale Earnhardt	2588	-658
7	Joe Millikan	2564	-682
8 ▲	Richard Childress	2390	-856
9 ▼	J.D. McDuffie	2372	-874
10 ▲	Buddy Arrington	2312	-934

Preceded by 1979 Coca-Cola 500	NASCAR Winston Cup Series Season; 1979	Succeeded by 1979 Champion Spark Plug 400

Preceded by 1978	Talladega 500 races 1979	Succeeded by 1980
