= 1979 World 600 =

Auto race held at Charlotte Motor Speedway in 1979

Race details
- Race 13 of 31 in the 1979 NASCAR Winston Cup Series season
- Layout of Charlotte Motor Speedway
- Date: May 27, 1979
- Official name: World 600
- Location: Charlotte Motor Speedway, Concord, North Carolina
- Course: Permanent racing facility
- Course length: 1.500 miles (2.414 km)
- Distance: 400 laps, 600 mi (965 km)
- Weather: Mild with temperatures of 75.9 °F (24.4 °C); wind speeds of 18.1 miles per hour (29.1 km/h)
- Average speed: 136.674 miles per hour (219.955 km/h)
- Attendance: 135,000

Pole position
Driver	Neil Bonnett	Wood Brothers Racing

Most laps led
Driver	Darrell Waltrip	DiGard Motorsports
- Laps: 175

Winner
No. 88	Darrell Waltrip	DiGard Motorsports

Television in the United States
- Network: CBS
- Announcers: Ken Squier; David Hobbs

The 1979 World 600, the 20th running of the event, was a NASCAR Winston Cup Series race that was held on May 27, 1979, at Charlotte Motor Speedway in Concord, North Carolina.

Before the performance, a skydiver was brought in to bring thrills to the audience; he would parachute into one of the turns. There was also an invocation service followed by the national anthem.

== Race report ==
Darrell Waltrip and Dale Earnhardt would fight it out on the closing laps of this race; Richard Petty would make a comeback and lose to Darrell Waltrip by six seconds.

Dick Brooks had terminal damage to his vehicle on lap 10. Blackie Wangerin would spin his vehicle out on lap 29 but would ultimately finish the race. Bill Elliott blew his engine on lap 36. Connie Saylor ended up crashing his vehicle on lap 114 while Bobby Fisher's race would end on lap 136. Glenn Jarrett spun his vehicle out on lap 167. Bobby Allison's had engine problems on lap 186 but he would finish the race.

While Earnhardt led 122 laps, Waltrip would mount an incredible racing strategy; leading at the most opportune times in the race. While Bobby Allison had engine problems, Tighe Scott had a tie rod issue on lap 372. Ron Hutcherson and Chuck Bown would fail to start the race due to various issues with their vehicle. There were 41 drivers on the starting grid. The duration of this race was 263 minutes with an audience of 136,000 in attendance for what would become a race loaded with lead changes. Chevrolet vehicles dominated the starting grid.

Winnings for this event ranged from the winner's portion of $55,400 ($245,757 when adjusted for inflation) to the last-place of $1,165 ($5,168 when adjusted for inflation). from a grand total of $321,780 ($1,427,428 when adjusted for inflation).

On May 16, 18-year-old Kyle Petty crashed twice during private tests. Two Dodges were badly damaged and his father Richard withdrew him from the race because he was not ready.

=== Qualifying ===
Grid	No.	Driver	Manufacturer
1	21	Neil Bonnett	Mercury
2	43	Richard Petty	Chevrolet
3	88	Darrell Waltrip	Chevrolet
4	27	Benny Parsons	Chevrolet
5	11	Cale Yarborough	Oldsmobile
6	1	Donnie Allison	Chevrolet
7	15	Bobby Allison	Ford
8	28	Buddy Baker	Chevrolet
9	9	Bill Elliott	Mercury
10	90	Ricky Rudd	Mercury
11	72	Joe Millikan	Chevrolet
12	14	Coo Coo Marlin	Chevrolet
13	71	Dave Marcis	Chevrolet
14	44	Terry Labonte	Chevrolet
15	2	Dale Earnhardt	Chevrolet

Withdrew from race: Kyle Petty

== Finishing order ==
Section reference:

1. Darrell Waltrip
2. Richard Petty
3. Dale Earnhardt
4. Cale Yarborough
5. Benny Parsons
6. Ricky Rudd
7. Terry Labonte
8. Al Holbert
9. Lennie Pond
10. Richard Childress
11. Grant Adcox
12. Buddy Arrington
13. J.D. McDuffie
14. Ronnie Thomas
15. Blackie Wangerin
16. Tighe Scott
17. Cecil Gordon
18. D.K. Ulrich
19. Jim Vandiver
20. Tommy Gale
21. Frank Warren
22. Bobby Allison
23. Harry Gant
24. Bruce Hill
25. Neil Bonnett
26. Dave Marcis
27. Joe Millikan
28. Bill Dennis
29. Glenn Jarrett
30. Coo Coo Marlin
31. Bobby Fisher
32. Skip Manning
33. James Hylton
34. Connie Saylor
35. Travis Tiller
36. Buddy Baker
37. Donnie Allison
38. Bill Elliott
39. Dick Brooks
40. Chuck Bown
41. Ron Hutcherson

== Standings after the race ==
Pos	Driver	Points	Differential
1 ▲	Darrell Waltrip	2066	0
2 ▼	Bobby Allison	2013	-53
3	Cale Yarborough	1897	-169
4	Richard Petty	1887	-179
5 ▲	Dale Earnhardt	1756	-310
6	Benny Parsons	1749	-317
7 ▼	Joe Millikan	1730	-336
8 ▲	D.K. Ulrich	1582	-484
9 ▲	Terry Labonte	1576	-490
10 ▲	Richard Childress	1541	-525

Preceded by 1979 Mason-Dixon 500	NASCAR Winston Cup Season; 1979	Succeeded by 1979 Texas 400

Preceded by 1978	World 600 races 1979	Succeeded by 1980
