= 1977 Cam 2 Motor Oil 400 =

Auto race held at Michigan International Speedway in 1977

Race details
- Race 15 of 30 in the 1977 NASCAR Winston Cup Series season
- 1977 Cam 2 Motor Oil 400 program cover
- Date: June 19, 1977
- Official name: Cam 2 Motor Oil 400
- Location: Michigan International Speedway, Brooklyn, Michigan
- Course: Permanent racing facility
- Course length: 3.218 km (2.000 miles)
- Distance: 200 laps, 400 mi (643 km)
- Weather: Temperatures of 86 °F (30 °C); wind speeds of 16.9 miles per hour (27.2 km/h)
- Average speed: 135.033 miles per hour (217.315 km/h)
- Attendance: 61,200

Pole position
Driver	David Pearson	Wood Brothers Racing

Most laps led
Driver	Cale Yarborough	Junior Johnson & Associates
- Laps: 106

Winner
No. 11	Cale Yarborough	Junior Johnson & Associates

Television in the United States
- Network: untelevised
- Announcers: none

The 1977 Cam 2 Motor Oil 400 was a NASCAR Winston Cup Series race that was held on June 19, 1977, at Michigan International Speedway in Brooklyn, Michigan.

== Background ==
Michigan International Speedway is a four-turn superspeedway that is 2 miles (3.2 km) long. Opened in 1968, the track's turns are banked at eighteen degrees, while the 3,600-foot-long front stretch, the location of the finish line, is banked at twelve degrees. The back stretch, has a five degree banking and is 2,242 feet long.

== Race report ==
36 drivers started this 200-lap event; all of them were born in the United States of America. Bill Seifert would return after a five-year absence from NASCAR and recorded a12th-place finish.

Ferrel Harris was credited with the last-place finish due to difficulties with his engine on the ninth lap. Donnie Allison would be the highest place finisher not to finish the race; he acquired a similar problem on lap 176. Cale Yarborough would defeat Richard Petty by ten seconds. More than 61,000 fans would see nearly three hours of racing. Benny Parsons, Cale Yarborough, Richard Petty, and future NASCAR on FOX personality Darrell Waltrip would duel among each other for the lead early on in the race. Winnings for each driver varied from $20,625 for the race winner ($105,153 when adjusted for inflation) to $1,300 for the last-place finisher ($6,746 when adjusted for inflation).

The total prize purse of this race was $123,005 ($638,262 when adjusted for inflation). Notable crew chiefs in the race were Buddy Parrott, Jake Elder, Joey Arrington, Kirk Shelmerdine, Dale Inman and Tim Brewer.

Janet Guthrie was the lone female competitor in this race. Richard Childress, then a driver/owner, competed in this race and finished in 35th place (after starting out in 8th place). County singer Marty Robbins made his first NASCAR Cup start in more than two years and turned in a solid top-15 performance.

Roland Wlodyka made his NASCAR Cup debut but finished 29th after a transmission failure.

It was the first start as an owner for eventual Cup Series Champion Rod Osterlund.

=== Qualifying ===
Grid	No.	Driver	Manufacturer
1	21	David Pearson	Mercury
2	72	Benny Parsons	Chevrolet
3	43	Richard Petty	Dodge
4	11	Cale Yarborough	Chevrolet
5	88	Darrell Waltrip	Chevrolet
6	2	Dave Marcis	Chevrolet
7	15	Buddy Baker	Ford
8	1	Donnie Allison	Chevrolet
9	27	Sam Sommers	Chevrolet
10	90	Dick Brooks	Ford
11	92	Skip Manning	Chevrolet
12	68	Janet Guthrie	Chevrolet
13	22	Ricky Rudd	Chevrolet
14	9	Bill Elliott	Ford
15	47	Bruce Hill	Chevrolet
16	12	Bobby Allison	Matador
17	75	Butch Hartman	Chevrolet
18	79	Frank Warren	Dodge
19	81	Terry Ryan	Chevrolet
20	16	David Sisco	Chevrolet
21	24	Cecil Gordon	Chevrolet
22	64	Tommy Gale	Ford
23	3	Richard Childress	Chevrolet
24	03	Bill Seifert	Chevrolet
25	52	Jimmy Means	Chevrolet

== Results ==
POS	ST	#	DRIVER	SPONSOR / OWNER	CAR	LAPS	MONEY	STATUS	LED	PTS
1	4	11	Cale Yarborough	Holly Farms (Junior Johnson)	Chevrolet	200	20625	running	106	185
2	3	43	Richard Petty	STP (Petty Enterprises)	Dodge	200	14425	running	5	175
3	2	72	Benny Parsons	1st National City Travelers Checks (L.G. DeWitt)	Chevrolet	200	10700	running	8	170
4	6	2	Dave Marcis	CAM 2 (Roger Penske)	Chevrolet	199	4750	running	65	165
5	1	21	David Pearson	Purolator (Wood Brothers)	Mercury	199	4550	running	4	160
6	7	15	Buddy Baker	Norris Industries (Bud Moore)	Ford	199	5750	running	0	150
7	10	90	Dick Brooks	Truxmore (Junie Donlavey)	Ford	197	4700	running	0	146
8	9	27	Sam Sommers	M.C. Anderson	Chevrolet	197	3150	running	0	142
9	17	75	Butch Hartman	Hartman Autocar (Butch Hartman)	Chevrolet	196	2050	running	0	138
10	16	12	Bobby Allison	1st National City Travelers Checks (Bobby Allison)	Matador	195	3800	running	0	134
11	26	48	James Hylton	Hylton Engineering (James Hylton)	Chevrolet	195	3880	running	0	130
12	24	03	Bill Seifert	Spirit of Public Enter. (Richard Childress)	Chevrolet	194	1750	running	0	127
13	33	42	Marty Robbins	Robbins Racing (Marty Robbins)	Dodge	193	1500	running	0	124
14	25	52	Jimmy Means	Means Racing (Bill Gray)	Chevrolet	193	2845	running	0	121
15	14	9	Bill Elliott	Dahlonega Ford Sales (George Elliott)	Ford	192	1330	running	0	118
16	28	40	D.K. Ulrich	J.R. DeLotto	Chevrolet	192	3060	running	0	115
17	19	81	Terry Ryan	Valvoline (Bill Monaghan)	Chevrolet	191	1225	running	0	112
18	34	74	Bobby Wawak	Clear-Lam (Bobby Wawak)	Chevrolet	191	1200	running	0	
19	35	67	Buddy Arrington	Buddy Arrington	Dodge	189	2865	running	0	106
20	27	70	J.D. McDuffie	J.D. McDuffie	Chevrolet	189	2680	running	0	103
21	21	24	Cecil Gordon	Transmissions Unlimited (Cecil Gordon)	Chevrolet	189	2395	running	0	100
22	32	19	Henley Gray	Belden Asphalt (Henley Gray)	Chevrolet	186	2160	running	0	97
23	22	64	Tommy Gale	Sunny King (Elmo Langley)	Ford	182	1975	running	0	94
24	8	1	Donnie Allison	Hawaiian Tropic (Hoss Ellington)	Chevrolet	176	1050	engine	3	96
25	20	16	David Sisco	David Sisco	Chevrolet	174	1665	running	0	88
26	12	68	Janet Guthrie	Kelly Girl (Lynda Ferreri)	Chevrolet	170	1000	running	0	85
27	11	92	Skip Manning	1st National City Travelers Checks (Billy Hagan)	Chevrolet	159	2605	engine	0	82
28	13	22	Ricky Rudd	Al Rudd Auto Parts (Al Rudd)	Chevrolet	131	950	engine	8	84
29	36	91	Roland Wlodyka	Rod Osterlund	Chevrolet	127	935	transmission	0	
30	18	79	Frank Warren	Native Tan (Frank Warren)	Dodge	112	1535	engine	0	73
31	29	30	Tighe Scott	Scotty's Fashions (Walter Ballard)	Chevrolet	100	1500	engine	0	70
32	15	47	Bruce Hill	t. edwards (Bruce Hill)	Chevrolet	92	890	driveshaft	0	67
33	31	0	John Kennedy	Avanti CB (John Kennedy)	Ford	66	880	engine	0	64
34	23	3	Richard Childress	Kansas Jack (Richard Childress)	Chevrolet	59	1320	engine	0	61
35	5	88	Darrell Waltrip	Gatorade (DiGard Racing)	Chevrolet	49	4010	engine	1	63
36	30	25	Ferrel Harris	Don Robertson	Chevrolet	9	1300	engine	0	55

== Standings after the race ==
Pos	Driver	Points	Differential
1	Cale Yarborough	2531	0
2	Richard Petty	2428	-103
3	Benny Parsons	2254	-277
4	Darrell Waltrip	2140	-391
5	Buddy Baker	2050	-481
6	Dick Brooks	1854	-677
7	Cecil Gordon	1803	-728
8	Richard Childress	1745	-786
9 ▲	Dave Marcis	1685	-846
10 ▼	James Hylton	1680	-851

Preceded by 1976	Cam 2 Motor Oil 400/Gabriel 400 races 1977	Succeeded by 1978

Preceded by 1977 NAPA 400	NASCAR Winston Cup Series Season; 1977	Succeeded by 1977 Firecracker 400
