= 1978 Southern 500 =

Auto race held at Darlington Raceway in 1978

Race details
- Race 22 of 30 in the 1978 NASCAR Winston Cup Series season
- 1978 Darlington 500 program cover
- Date: September 4, 1978
- Official name: Southern 500
- Location: Darlington Raceway, Darlington, South Carolina
- Course: Permanent racing facility
- Course length: 1.375 miles (2.212 km)
- Distance: 367 laps, 500.5 mi (805.4 km)
- Weather: Temperatures of 88 °F (31 °C); wind speeds of 8.9 miles per hour (14.3 km/h)
- Average speed: 116.828 miles per hour (188.016 km/h)

Pole position
Driver	David Pearson	Wood Brothers Racing
- Time: 31.998 seconds

Most laps led
Driver	Cale Yarborough	Junior Johnson & Associates
- Laps: 203

Winner
No. 11	Cale Yarborough	Junior Johnson & Associates

Television in the United States
- Network: ABC
- Announcers: Keith Jackson; Chris Economaki

The 1978 Southern 500, the 29th running of the event, was a NASCAR Winston Cup Series racing event that took place on September 4, 1978, at Darlington Raceway in Darlington, South Carolina.

== Background ==
Darlington Raceway, nicknamed by many NASCAR fans and drivers as "The Lady in Black" or "The Track Too Tough to Tame" and advertised as a "NASCAR Tradition", is a race track built for NASCAR racing located near Darlington, South Carolina. It is of a unique, somewhat egg-shaped design, an oval with the ends of very different configurations, a condition which supposedly arose from the proximity of one end of the track to a minnow pond the owner refused to relocate. This situation makes it very challenging for the crews to set up their cars' handling in a way that will be effective at both ends.

The track is a four-turn 1.366 miles (2.198 km) oval. The track's first two turns are banked at twenty-five degrees, while the final two turns are banked two degrees lower at twenty-three degrees. The front stretch (the location of the finish line) and the back stretch are banked at six degrees. Darlington Raceway can seat up to 60,000 people.

Darlington has something of a legendary quality among drivers and older fans; this is probably due to its long track length relative to other NASCAR speedways of its era and hence the first venue where many of them became cognizant of the truly high speeds that stock cars could achieve on a long track. The track allegedly earned the moniker The Lady in Black because the night before the race the track maintenance crew would cover the entire track with fresh asphalt sealant, in the early years of the speedway, thus making the racing surface dark black. Darlington is also known as "The Track Too Tough to Tame" because drivers can run lap after lap without a problem and then bounce off of the wall the following lap. Racers will frequently explain that they have to race the racetrack, not their competition. Drivers hitting the wall are considered to have received their "Darlington Stripe" thanks to the missing paint on the right side of the car.

== Race report ==
40 competitors competed in this 367-lap race. Attendance was 65000. The race lasted four hours and seventeen minutes. Nine cautions slowed the race for 72 laps; 21 changes for first-place position were made. The race leader remained unchanged for long periods of time; including Cale Yarborough's 69-lap lead which lasted from lap 118 to lap 186 and his late-race streak where he would take over the lead on lap 261 and would not relinquish it.

Cale Yarborough would defeat Darrell Waltrip by three seconds while Richard Petty, rookie driver Terry Labonte, and Bobby Allison would round out the top five finishers. Yarborough's win would become his fourth at the Southern 500. Terry Labonte would make an impressive Winston Cup debut at this race. He was 11 laps down at the end, but finished fourth.

Yarborough would retain the lead in championship points after this race. Bruce Hill would finish in last place on lap 80 due to a problem with his vehicle's rear end. David Pearson would get the pole position with a speed of 153.685 miles per hour (247.332 km/h). D. K. Ulrich was cited for nitrous oxide in his vehicle and lost the rest of the 1978 Winston Cup Series season. Neil Bonnett had an unfortunate incident by hitting the telephone wires while exiting pit road; nobody was injured.

Notable crew chiefs who participated in the race were Darrell Bryant, Junie Donlavey, Buddy Parrott, Jake Elder, Joey Arrington, Kirk Shelmerdine, Dale Inman and Bud Moore.

The total purse of the race was $200,170 ($988,084 when considering inflation); Yarborough received $30,175 for winning the race. ($148,951 when considering inflation).

=== Qualifying ===
Grid	No.	Driver	Manufacturer	Qualifying time	Speed	Owner
1	21	David Pearson	Mercury	31.998	153.685	Wood Brothers
2	88	Darrell Waltrip	Chevrolet	32.125	153.077	DiGard
3	15	Bobby Allison	Ford	32.170	152.863	Bud Moore
4	72	Benny Parsons	Chevrolet	32.285	152.318	L.G. DeWitt
5	54	Lennie Pond	Chevrolet	32.302	152.238	Harry Ranier
6	11	Cale Yarborough	Oldsmobile	32.314	152.182	Junior Johnson
7	1	Donnie Allison	Chevrolet	32.397	151.792	Hoss Ellington
8	5	Neil Bonnett	Chevrolet	32.424	151.665	Rod Osterlund
9	43	Richard Petty	Chevrolet	32.431	151.633	Petty Enterprises
10	2	Dave Marcis	Chevrolet	32.496	151.329	Rod Osterlund

== Top 10 finishers ==
Pos	Grid	No.	Driver	Manufacturer	Laps	Winnings	Laps led	Points	Time/Status
1	6	11	Cale Yarborough	Oldsmobile	367	$30,175	203	185	4:17:46
2	2	88	Darrell Waltrip	Chevrolet	367	$18,450	44	175	+3 seconds
3	9	43	Richard Petty	Chevrolet	366	$13,175	1	170	+1 lap
4	19	92	Terry Labonte	Chevrolet	356	$9,850	0	160	+11 laps
5	3	15	Bobby Allison	Ford	355	$10,875	21	160	+12 laps
6	16	9	Bill Elliott	Mercury	355	$5,200	0	150	+12 laps
7	25	48	James Hylton	Chevrolet	353	$7,000	0	146	+14 laps
8	29	67	Buddy Arrington	Dodge	350	$6,380	0	142	+17 laps
9	28	25	Ronnie Thomas	Chevrolet	349	$6,270	0	138	+18 laps
10	4	72	Benny Parsons	Chevrolet	348	$7,650	12	139	+19 laps

== Standings after the race ==
Pos	Driver	Points	Differential
1	Cale Yarborough	3532	0
2 ▲	Benny Parsons	3244	-288
3 ▼	Dave Marcis	3197	-335
4	Darrell Waltrip	3083	-449
5	Bobby Allison	3001	-531
6	Richard Petty	2966	-566
7 ▲	Buddy Arrington	2724	-808
8 ▼	Lennie Pond	2708	-824
9	Dick Brooks	2643	-889
10	Richard Childress	2586	-946

Preceded by 1978 Volunteer 500	NASCAR Winston Cup Series Season; 1978	Succeeded by 1978 Capital City 400
Preceded by 1977	Southern 500 races 1978	Succeeded by 1979
