= 1978 Old Dominion 500 =

Auto race held at Martinsville Speedway in 1978

Race details
- Race 25 of 30 in the 1978 NASCAR Winston Cup Series season
- A map showing the layout of Martinsville Speedway
- Date: September 24, 1978
- Official name: Old Dominion 500
- Location: Martinsville Speedway, Martinsville, Virginia
- Course: Permanent racing facility
- Course length: 0.525 miles (0.844 km)
- Distance: 500 laps, 262.5 mi (442.4 km)
- Weather: Mild with temperatures of 70 °F (21 °C); wind speeds of 8 miles per hour (13 km/h)
- Average speed: 79.185 miles per hour (127.436 km/h)

Pole position
Driver	Lennie Pond	Ranier Racing

Most laps led
Driver	Cale Yarborough	Junior Johnson & Associates
- Laps: 372

Winner
No. 11	Cale Yarborough	Junior Johnson & Associates

Television in the United States
- Network: untelevised
- Announcers: none

The 1978 Old Dominion 500 was a NASCAR Winston Cup Series race that took place on September 24, 1978, at Martinsville Speedway in Martinsville, Virginia. This race was the 28th to be held as a part of what is now known as the Xfinity 500.

By 1980, NASCAR had completely stopped tracking the year model of all the vehicles and most teams did not take stock cars to the track under their own power anymore.

== Background ==
Martinsville Speedway is one of five short tracks to hold NASCAR races. The standard track at Martinsville Speedway is a four-turn short track oval that is 0.526 miles (0.847 km) long. The track's turns are banked at eleven degrees, while the front stretch, the location of the finish line, is banked at zero degrees. The back stretch also has a zero degree banking.

== Race report ==
Five hundred laps were done on a paved oval track spanning 0.525 miles (0.845 km) for a grand total of 262.5 miles (422.5 km). The complete time of the race was three hours, nineteen minutes, and fifty-four seconds. There were four cautions given out by the NASCAR officials for nineteen laps. Cale Yarborough defeated Darrell Waltrip by three car lengths; taking home his sixth and final Cup victory at Martinsville. Yarborough was on a tear here in the second half of the 1970s, this win marked his fourth win over the course of the prior five Martinsville races. Notable speeds recorded in both the qualifying session and the race were: 79.185 miles per hour (127.436 km/h) as the average speed and 86.558 miles per hour (139.302 km/h) as the pole position speed. Twenty thousand people attended this live race.

Chevrolet vehicles would dominate the starting grid of the event with multi-car teams dominating the lineup. By the late 1970s, it had become prohibitively expensive for a single person to own a NASCAR team. A series of oil crises in addition to changing sponsorship needs started to bring in the age of the multi-car team and the slow decline of the independent owners.

Harry Gant would lead a NASCAR Cup Series race for the first time in his career. However, he would only run ninety laps before having to leave the race due to an engine problem. Terry Labonte's third career start nets him his third career top-10 finish. Though running up front for half the laps one completes is generally a good thing, Gant's 45 laps led translate in this case to 90 laps run before the engine expired. This would cause him to be relegated to a 28th-place finish and only $1,070 in prize winnings ($5,282 when considering inflation).

Total winnings for this race were $101,430 ($500,681 when considering inflation) and Cale Yarborough took the majority of the winnings with an easy $24,950 paycheck ($123,159 when considering inflation).

Satch Worley retired from NASCAR after this race, while Lennie Pond did not secure another pole position. Herb Nab served as Pond’s crew chief during the qualifying run that earned Pond pole position and a silver trophy.

Other crew chiefs who fully participated in the race were Darrell Bryant, Junie Donlavey, Buddy Parrott, Jake Elder, Kirk Shelmerdine, Dale Inman, Walter Ballard, Tim Brewer, and Bud Moore.

=== Qualifying ===
Grid	No.	Driver	Manufacturer	Owner
1	54	Lennie Pond	Chevrolet	Harry Ranier
2	43	Richard Petty	Chevrolet	Petty Enterprises
3	88	Darrell Waltrip	Chevrolet	DiGard Racing
4	72	Benny Parsons	Chevrolet	L.G. DeWitt
5	27	Buddy Baker	Chevrolet	M.C. Anderson
6	11	Cale Yarborough	Oldsmobile	Junior Johnson
7	5	Neil Bennett	Chevrolet	Rod Osterlund
8	21	David Pearson	Mercury	Wood Brothers
9	15	Bobby Allison	Ford	Bud Moore
10	12	Harry Gant	Chevrolet	Kennie Childers

== Finishing order ==
Section reference:

1. Cale Yarborough†
2. Darrell Waltrip
3. Benny Parsons†
4. Neil Bonnett†
5. Lennie Pond
6. Richard Petty
7. Bobby Allison
8. Dave Marcis
9. Terry Labonte
10. Buddy Arrington
11. James Hylton†
12. Richard Childress
13. Dick Brooks†
14. Satch Worley*
15. Gary Myers
16. Ronnie Thomas
17. Dick May†
18. Ed Negre
19. Baxter Price
20. Ferrel Harris†
21. Frank Warren†
22. J.D. McDuffie*†
23. Jimmy Means*
24. Roger Hamby*
25. David Pearson*
26. Buddy Baker*†
27. Tommy Gale*†
28. Harry Gant*
29. Tighe Scott*
30. Cecil Gordon*†

* Driver failed to finish race
† Driver is deceased

== Timeline ==
Section reference:

- Start of race: Lennie Pond had the pole position to begin the race.
- Lap 20: Cecil Gordon had to be brought out of the race because his brakes weren't working.
- Lap 42: Tighe Scott had a terminal crash; forcing him to exit the race.
- Lap 46: Harry Gant took over the lead from Lennie Pond.
- Lap 90: Cale Yarborough took over the lead from Harry Gant.
- Lap 111: Tommy Gale's engine could not go on any longer and gave out in the middle of the race.
- Lap 247: Darrell Waltrip took over the lead from Cale Yarborough.
- Lap 270: Cale Yarborough took over the lead from Darrell Waltrip.
- Lap 329: Buddy Baker's engine stopped working properly.
- Lap 340: The rear end of David Pearson's vehicle fell out, making it too dangerous for him to continue racing.
- Lap 354: Roger Hamby had serious issues with his brakes that required him to exit the event.
- Lap 403: Jimmy Means managed to overheat his vehicle while racing.
- Lap 409: J.D. McDuffie's terribly performing brakes forced him into the sidelines.
- Lap 453: Ferrell Harris had a faulty engine that forced him out of the race.
- Lap 473: Darrell Waltrip took over the lead from Cale Yarborough.
- Lap 488: Cale Yarborough took over the lead from Darrell Waltrip.
- Finish: Cale Yarborough was officially declared the winner of the event.

== Standings after the race ==
Pos	Driver	Points	Differential
1	Cale Yarborough	4052	0
2 ▲	Benny Parsons	3644	-408
3 ▼	Dave Marcis	3624	-428
4	Darrell Waltrip	3598	-454
5	Bobby Allison	3507	-545
6	Richard Petty	3306	-746
7	Lennie Pond	3146	-906
8	Dick Brooks	3072	-980
9	Buddy Arrington	3070	-982
10	Richard Childress	2970	-1082

Preceded by 1978 Delaware 500	NASCAR Winston Cup Series Season; 1978	Succeeded by 1978 Wilkes 400

Preceded by 1977	Old Dominion 500 races 1978	Succeeded by 1979
