= 1979 Texas 400 =

Auto race held at Texas World Speedway in 1979

Race details
- Race 14 of 31 in the 1979 NASCAR Winston Cup Series season
- Layout of Texas World Speedway
- Date: June 9, 1979
- Official name: Texas 400
- Location: Texas World Speedway, College Station, Texas
- Course: Permanent racing facility
- Course length: 3.218 km (2.000 miles)
- Distance: 200 laps, 400 mi (643.738 km)
- Weather: Hot with temperatures of 90 °F (32 °C); wind speeds of 11.8 miles per hour (19.0 km/h)
- Average speed: 156.216 miles per hour (251.405 km/h)
- Attendance: 11,500

Pole position
Driver	Buddy Baker	Ranier Racing

Most laps led
Driver	Darrell Waltrip	DiGard Motorsports
- Laps: 155

Winner
No. 88	Darrell Waltrip	DiGard Motorsports

Television in the United States
- Network: untelevised
- Announcers: none

The 1979 Texas 400 was a NASCAR Winston Cup Series race that took place on June 3, 1979, at Texas World Speedway in College Station, Texas.

== Race report ==
Two hundred laps took place on an oval track spanning 2.0 miles (3.2 km). Darrell Waltrip won the race; beating Bobby Allison by 60 seconds. Eleven thousand and five hundred fans would attend this live race with lasted more than two hours and thirty-three minutes; making it the least attended race in NASCAR's modern era even when comparing races from after the 2008 NASCAR Sprint Cup Series season. Waltrip's overall speed for the race was 156.216 miles per hour (251.405 km/h) while Buddy Baker achieved the pole position for the race with a speed of 167.903 miles per hour (270.214 km/h). Total winnings for this race were $161,250 ($698,602.13 when considering inflation); Darrell would receive $21,750 of the total purse ($94,230.06 when considering inflation).

Dale Earnhardt was Waltrip's top challenger before he crashed late in the race. Waltrip had a lap lead but Allison, Baker, and Yarborough had a one-lap dash for second. Allison got second by about two feet over Baker, who was about four feet back. Some of the more notable names to make an appearance here were: Dale Earnhardt, Richard Childress, Cale Yarborough, Terry Labonte, Richard Petty, and J. D. McDuffie.

Notable crew chiefs in attendance for this race were Buddy Parrott, Joey Arrington, Kirk Shelmerdine, Darrell Bryant, Dale Inman, Bud Moore, Tim Brewer, and Jake Elder.

While Jim Hurlbert and John Rezek would make their NASCAR Cup Series debut, Billy Hagan would make his grand exit after this race along with three other drivers. Bill Meazel would make his only NASCAR appearance during this event.

=== Qualifying ===
Grid	No.	Driver	Manufacturer
1	28	Buddy Baker	Chevrolet
2	44	Terry Labonte	Chevrolet
3	2	Dale Earnhardt	Chevrolet
4	88	Darrell Waltrip	Chevrolet
5	11	Cale Yarborough	Chevrolet
6	15	Bobby Allison	Ford
7	90	Ricky Rudd	Mercury
8	27	Benny Parsons	Chevrolet
9	43	Richard Petty	Chevrolet
10	72	Joe Millikan	Chevrolet
11	12	Lennie Pond	Chevrolet
12	40	D.K. Ulrich	Buick
13	50	Bruce Hill	Buick
14	64	Tommy Gale	Ford
15	25	Ronnie Thomas	Chevrolet
16	48	James Hylton	Chevrolet
17	67	Buddy Arrington	Dodge
18	79	Frank Warren	Dodge
19	3	Richard Childress	Oldsmobile
20	45	Baxter Price	Chevrolet
21	70	J.D. McDuffie	Chevrolet
22	19	Billy Hagan	Chevrolet
23	52	Jimmy Means	Chevrolet
24	31	John Rezek	Oldsmobile
25	36	H.B. Bailey	Pontiac

== Finishing order ==
1. Darrell Waltrip (No. 88)
2. Bobby Allison (No. 15)
3. Buddy Baker† (No. 28)
4. Cale Yarborough†(No. 11)
5. Terry Labonte (No. 44)
6. Richard Petty (No. 43)
7. Richard Childress (No. 3)
8. Joe Millikan (No. 72)
9. Buddy Arrington (No. 67)
10. James Hylton† (No. 48)
11. John Rezek (No. 31)
12. Dale Earnhardt*† (No. 2)
13. Bruce Hill (No. 50)
14. J. D. McDuffie† (No. 70)
15. D. K. Ulrich (No. 40)
16. H. B. Bailey† (No. 36)
17. Billy Hagan† (No. 19)
18. Earle Canavan† (No. 01)
19. Frank Warren (No. 79)
20. Tommy Gale† (No. 64)
21. Cecil Gordon† (No. 24)
22. Mike Potter (No. 76)
23. Jimmy Means (No. 52)
24. Jim Hurlbert (No. 96)
25. Benny Parsons*† (No. 27)
26. Ronnie Thomas* (No. 25)
27. Baxter Price* (No. 45)
28. Ricky Rudd* (No. 90)
29. Mike Kempton (No. 69)
30. Dick May*† (No. 09)
31. Lennie Pond*† (No. 12)
32. Bill Meazell* (No. 55)
33. John Haver* (No. 58)
34. Jimmy Finger* (No. 32)

† signifies that the driver is known to be deceased
* Driver failed to finish race

== Timeline ==
Section reference:

- Start: Terry Labonte was leading the other drivers as the green flag was waved in the air.
- Lap 5: Jimmy Finger fell out with engine failure.
- Lap 36: John Haver fell out with engine failure.
- Lap 46: Bill Meazel fell out with engine failure.
- Lap 70: Lennie Pond fell out with engine failure.
- Lap 113: Dick May fell out with engine failure.
- Lap 135: Ricky Rudd fell out with engine failure.
- Lap 139: Baxter Price's vehicle developed a problematic transmission.
- Lap 140: The wheel on Ronnie Thomas' vehicle became non-functional.
- Lap 143: The spindle on Benny Parsons' vehicle developed problems.
- Lap 194: Caution due to Dale Earnhardt's accident on turn three; caution ended on lap 198.
- Finish: Darrell Waltrip was officially declared the winner of the event.

== Standings after the race ==
Pos	Driver	Points	Differential
1	Darrell Waltrip	2251	0
2	Bobby Allison	2183	-68
3	Cale Yarborough	2057	-194
4	Richard Petty	2037	-214
5	Dale Earnhardt	1888	-363
6 ▲	Joe Millikan	1872	-379
7 ▼	Benny Parsons	1837	-414
8 ▲	Terry Labonte	1736	-515
9 ▲	Buddy Baker	1704	-547
10 ▼	D.K. Ulrich	1700	-551

Preceded by 1979 World 600	NASCAR Winston Cup Series Season; 1979	Succeeded by 1979 NAPA Riverside 400
