= Ron Hutcherson =

American racecar driver (1943–2022)

Ronald Hutcherson
- Born: April 24, 1943; Keokuk, Iowa, U.S.
- Died: August 25, 2022 (aged 79); Florida, U.S.

NASCAR Cup Series career
- 10 races run over 4 years
- Best finish: 66th – 1977 NASCAR Winston Cup Series season
- First race: 1972 American 500 (North Carolina Motor Speedway)
- Last race: 1979 World 600 (Charlotte Motor Speedway)
Wins	Top tens	Poles
0	2	0

Ronald Hutcherson (April 4, 1943 – August 25, 2022) was an American NASCAR Winston Cup Series and ARCA driver whose career spanned from 1972 to 1979. He was the brother of NASCAR race winner and IMCA champion Dick Hutcherson. Engine builder Parker Nall built most of the engines that Hutcherson would use to win his races.

== Career ==
=== NASCAR ===
Hutcherson completed 1,521 laps (2974.7 miles) in his NASCAR career. He averaged a 16th place starting position and an estimated average finish of 25th. His NASCAR career earnings totaled $52,645.

Hutcherson's best Winston Cup results came on restrictor plate tracks, where his career average was 21st-place, and his worst results came at certain intermediate tracks where he averaged 40th place. According to his results, his best track was Talladega Superspeedway, while Rockingham Speedway was his worst. Driving the No. 57 Ford McClure Motors vehicle for Alfred McClure was his primary ride during his career. Other teams that Hutcherson competed for include Donlavey Racing and A. J. Foyt Enterprises.

=== ARCA ===
Hutcherson would also find success in the ARCA racing series based in the Midwestern United States.

One of his most triumphant years would be 1977 where he would defeat Jim Sauter by half a car length in a 200-mile race after his Winston Cup Series car was declared ineligible to compete in a nearby NASCAR race that day. During this era, his ARCA vehicle was perfectly legal for NASCAR but his NASCAR vehicle did not fill the valid template. Many of the top-level NASCAR teams, like those employing Darrell Waltrip and Cale Yarborough at the time, were fined $250 for having fuel tanks that did not meet the specifications for NASCAR during that time.
