= Ferrel Harris =

Racecar driver from Kentucky

- Born: October 8, 1940; Pikeville, Kentucky, U.S.
- Died: May 7, 2000 (aged 59)

NASCAR Cup Series career
- 41 races run over 7 years
- Best finish: 35th - 1978 Winston Cup Series season
- First race: 1975 Daytona 500 (Daytona International Speedway)
- Last race: 1982 Winston 500 (Alabama International Motor Speedway)
Wins	Top tens	Poles
0	5	0

Ferrel Harris (October 8, 1940 – May 7, 2000) was an American NASCAR Winston Cup Series driver whose career spanned from 1975 to 1982.

== Career ==
Harris acquired no wins, no finishes in the top-five, and five finishes in the top ten. Out of the 8975 laps that Harris raced in his NASCAR career, he led none of them. Harris' total earnings were $86,000 with 12,254.5 miles (19,721.7 km) of total racing experience. Average starts for Harris were in 27th while his average career finishes were in 21st. During his NASCAR Cup Series career, Harris failed to qualify for three races. Notable races for this driver were the 1975 Daytona 500, the 1978 Daytona 500, (finishing in tenth place driving Jim Stacy's No. 6 Dodge Magnum), the 1979 Southern 500, and the 1978 Old Dominion 500.

As an ARCA driver, Harris was notable for winning the 1983 Daytona ARCA 200 (now the Lucas Oil Slick Mist 200). Most of his top-ten finishes were done on restrictor plate tracks. Harris failed to qualify at the 1983 Daytona 500, the 1984 Daytona 500, and at the 1985 Southern 500 (the last race that he qualified for was the 1982 Winston 500 - all further attempts at racing ended with failed qualifying sessions).

Harris was married to Bobbie Harris (August 12, 1931 – April 24, 2020) and had one stepson, Charles Randall "Randy" Salyers, and two stepdaughters, Condra "Connie" Lee Salyers Jones, and Robbie Lou Salyers. He and his family lived at Cox Farm, in Pikeville, Kentucky, - a nearly 300-acre (1.2 km^{2}) estate that has been in Bobbie's family since the early 1900s.
