= 1978 NASCAR Winston Cup Series =

American motorsport season

Seasons
- ← 1977 1979 →

The 1978 NASCAR Grand National Winston Cup Series was the 30th season of professional stock car racing in the United States and the 7th modern era NASCAR Cup series. The season began on Sunday, January 22 and ended on Sunday, November 19. Cale Yarborough driving the Junior Johnson #11 First National City Travelers Checks Oldsmobile won his then-record third consecutive NASCAR Grand National Winston Cup championship. Ronnie Thomas was crowned NASCAR Rookie of the Year in a tight battle with Roger Hamby.

== Teams and drivers ==
=== Complete schedule ===
Make	Team	No.	Driver	Crew Chief
Chevrolet	DiGard Racing	88	Darrell Waltrip	Buddy Parrott
Chevrolet	McDuffie Racing	70	J.D. McDuffie	
Ford	Bud Moore Engineering	15	Bobby Allison	Bud Moore
Ford	Langley Racing	64	Dick Brooks 3	
Ford	Langley Racing	64	Tommy Gale 26	
Ford	Langley Racing	64	Elmo Langley 1	
Oldsmobile	Junior Johnson & Associates	11	Cale Yarborough	Tim Brewer
Chevrolet Dodge	Petty Enterprises	43	Richard Petty	Dale Inman
Chevrolet Dodge Oldsmobile	Jim Stacy Racing16; Rod Osterlund Racing14	5	Neil Bonnett	Harry Hyde
Chevrolet Oldsmobile	Ballard Racing	30	Tighe Scott	
Chevrolet Oldsmobile	DeWitt Racing	72	Benny Parsons	Jake Elder
Chevrolet Oldsmobile	Richard Childress Racing	3	Richard Childress	
Chevrolet Oldsmobile	Rod Osterlund Racing	2	Dave Marcis	
Dodge Ford	Arrington Racing	67	Buddy Arrington	

=== Limited schedule ===
Make	Team	No.	Driver	Crew Chief	Rounds
Buick	A. J. Foyt Enterprises	51	A. J. Foyt		2
Buick	Emerson Racing	66	Harry Gant		1
Chevrolet	Adcox Racing	41	Grant Adcox	George White	14
Chevrolet	Gordon Racing	24	Cecil Gordon		25
Chevrolet	Gordon Racing	24	Junior Miller		1
Chevrolet	Hylton Racing	18	James Hylton	Kirk Shelmerdine	2
Chevrolet	Jimmy Means Racing	52	Jimmy Means		26
Chevrolet	Kennie Childers Racing	12	Harry Gant		4
Chevrolet	Miller Racing	95	Junior Miller		1
Chevrolet	Robertson Racing	25	Ronnie Thomas (R)		28
Chevrolet	Robertson Racing	81	Jabe Thomas		1
Chevrolet	Price Racing	45	Baxter Price (R)		25
Chevrolet	Richard Childress Racing	31	Bobby Wawak		1
Chevrolet	Wawak Racing	74	Bobby Wawak		9
Chevrolet	Wawak Racing	74	Dick May		2
Chevrolet	Wawak Racing	74	Joe Booher		2
Chevrolet	Wawak Racing	74	Tommy Gale		1
Chrysler	Negre Racing	1	Ed Negre	Norman Negre	1
Chrysler	Negre Racing	18	Ed Negre	Norman Negre	1
Chrysler	Negre Racing	81	Ed Negre	Norman Negre	2
Chrysler	Negre Racing	61	Ferrel Harris	Norman Negre	1
Dodge	Jim Stacy Racing	6	Ferrel Harris	Harry Hyde	2
Dodge	Arrington Racing	7	Ed Negre		1
Dodge	Arrington Racing	7	Joey Arrington		1
Dodge	Arrington Racing	19	Joey Arrington		1
Dodge	Warren Racing	19	Frank Warren		1
Dodge	Warren Racing	79	Frank Warren		29
Ford	Champion Racing	10	Jimmy Means		1
Ford	Cronkrite Racing	96	Dale Earnhardt		4
Ford	Cronkrite Racing	96	Baxter Price (R)		1
Mercury	Makar Racing	84	Morgan Shepherd		2
Mercury	Wangerin Racing	39	Blackie Wangerin (R)		10
Mercury	Wangerin Racing	84	Skip Manning		1
Mercury	Wood Brothers Racing	21	David Pearson		22
Oldsmobile	Clary Racing	05	Bruce Hill		16
Buick Chevrolet	Gray Racing	10	Elmo Langley		1
Buick Chevrolet	Gray Racing	19	Elmo Langley		1
Buick Chevrolet	Gray Racing	19	Woody Fisher		4
Buick Chevrolet	Gray Racing	19	Dick May		18
Buick Chevrolet	Gray Racing	19	Joe Booher		1
Buick Chevrolet	Gray Racing	19	Bob Burcham		1
Buick Chevrolet	Gray Racing	19	Joey Arrington		1
Buick Chevrolet	Gray Racing	19	Bill Dennis		1
Buick Chevrolet	Rod Osterlund Racing	98	Roland Wlodyka		7
Buick Chevrolet	Rod Osterlund Racing	98	Dale Earnhardt		1
Buick Chevrolet	Rod Osterlund Racing	98	Jimmy Insolo		1
Buick Chevrolet	Rudd Racing Enterprises	12	James Hylton		1
Buick Chevrolet	Rudd Racing Enterprises	22	Ricky Rudd		13
Buick Chevrolet	Ulrich Racing	40	D.K. Ulrich		23
Buick Chevrolet Oldsmobile	Hagan Racing	92	Skip Manning		15
Buick Chevrolet Oldsmobile	Hagan Racing	92	Mel Larson		1
Buick Chevrolet Oldsmobile	Hagan Racing	92	Terry Labonte		5
Buick Chevrolet Oldsmobile	Hagan Racing	92	Dick May		2
Chevrolet Oldsmobile	Craker Racing	01	Jimmy Insolo	Leon Ruther	3
Chevrolet Oldsmobile	Ellington Racing	1	Donnie Allison		17
Chevrolet Oldsmobile	Hamby Motorsports	17	Roger Hamby (R)		27
Chevrolet Oldsmobile	Hylton Racing	48	Al Holbert (R)	Kirk Shelmerdine	12
Chevrolet Oldsmobile	Hylton Racing	48	James Hylton	Kirk Shelmerdine	16
Chevrolet Oldsmobile	Hylton Racing	48	Walter Ballard	Kirk Shelmerdine	1
Chevrolet Oldsmobile	M. C. Anderson Racing	27	Buddy Baker		19
Chevrolet Oldsmobile	Ranier Racing	54	Lennie Pond		29
Chevrolet Pontiac	Myers Racing	4	Gary Myers		20
Chrysler Dodge	Negre Racing	8	Ed Negre	Norman Negre	18
Chrysler Dodge	Negre Racing	8	Dick May	Norman Negre	1
Ford Mercury	Donlavey Racing	90	Dick Brooks		27
Mercury Oldsmobile	Elliott Racing	9	Bill Elliott		10

== Season recap ==
No	Date	Event	Circuit	Winner
1	January 22	Winston Western 500	Riverside International Raceway	Cale Yarborough
	February 16	125 Mile Qualifying Races	Daytona International Speedway	A. J. Foyt
	February 16	125 Mile Qualifying Races	Daytona International Speedway	Darrell Waltrip
2	February 19	Daytona 500	Daytona International Speedway	Bobby Allison
3	February 26	Richmond 400	Richmond Fairgrounds Raceway	Benny Parsons
4	March 5	Carolina 500	North Carolina Speedway	David Pearson
5	March 19	Atlanta 500	Atlanta International Raceway	Bobby Allison
6	April 2	Southeastern 400	Bristol International Raceway	Darrell Waltrip
7	April 9	Rebel 500	Darlington Raceway	Benny Parsons
8	April 16	Gwyn Staley 400	North Wilkesboro Speedway	Darrell Waltrip
9	April 23	Virginia 500	Martinsville Speedway	Darrell Waltrip
10	May 14	Winston 500	Alabama International Motor Speedway	Cale Yarborough
11	May 21	Mason-Dixon 500	Dover Downs International Speedway	David Pearson
12	May 28	World 600	Charlotte Motor Speedway	Darrell Waltrip
13	June 3	Music City USA 420	Nashville Speedway	Cale Yarborough
14	June 11	NAPA 400	Riverside International Raceway	Benny Parsons
15	June 18	Cam 2 Motor Oil 400	Michigan International Speedway	Cale Yarborough
16	July 4	Firecracker 400	Daytona International Speedway	David Pearson
17	July 15	Nashville 420	Nashville Speedway	Cale Yarborough
18	July 30	Coca-Cola 500	Pocono Raceway	Darrell Waltrip
19	August 6	Talladega 500	Alabama International Motor Speedway	Lennie Pond
20	August 20	Champion Spark Plug 400	Michigan International Speedway	David Pearson
21	August 26	Volunteer 400	Bristol International Raceway	Cale Yarborough
22	September 4	Southern 500	Darlington Raceway	Cale Yarborough
23	September 10	Capital City 400	Richmond Fairgrounds Raceway	Darrell Waltrip
24	September 17	Delaware 500	Dover Downs International Speedway	Bobby Allison
25	September 24	Old Dominion 500	Martinsville Speedway	Cale Yarborough
26	October 1	Wilkes 400	North Wilkesboro Speedway	Cale Yarborough
27	October 8	National 500	Charlotte Motor Speedway	Bobby Allison
28	October 22	American 500	North Carolina Speedway	Cale Yarborough
29	November 5	Dixie 500	Atlanta International Raceway	Donnie Allison
30	November 19	Los Angeles Times 500	Ontario Motor Speedway	Bobby Allison

== Notable races ==
- Winston Western 500 - NASCAR banned the Chevrolet Laguna S3 racecar but also allowed Chevrolet engines to be used in other General Motors brands; as a result teams were fielding Monte Carlos, Chevrolet Malibus, Buick Centuries, and Oldsmobile Cutlasses. The Oldsmobile brand reached its first win since 1959 as Cale Yarborough drove Junior Johnson's Olds to the win. Bobby Allison, making his debut in Bud Moore's Ford, fell out after 40 laps, while Richard Petty finished 16th after rearend failure; Petty was driving the 1974 Dodge Charger for the final time as the car's Winston Cup Grand National eligibility ended after this race.
1. 11 - Cale Yarborough
2. 72 - Benny Parsons
3. 21 - David Pearson
4. 5 - Neil Bonnett
5. 2 - Dave Marcis
6. 95 - Hershel McGriff
7. 01 - Jimmy Insolo
8. 48 - Al Holbert
9. 29 - Roy Smith
10. 40 - D.K. Ulrich

- Daytona 125s - The two qualifying races for the Daytona 500 were the first superspeedway test of the new 1977-78 model racecars now eligible for NASCAR competition. Preseason testing had exposed serious stability issues with the cars, particularly the Olds Cutlass with its shorter rear deck and open rear side windows; Cale Yarborough and Donnie Allison were pointed in their concerns about the instability of the Olds (said Donnie, "I can't drive the Olds, it moves around too much"); Richard Petty was similarly critical of the Dodge Magnum ("The Magnum is undriveable at 190 MPH") he now was fielding. Cale won the pole for the 500 while Ron Hutcherson timed second. In the 125s the lead changed a combined 25 times. Bobby Allison and Buddy Baker crashed out of the first 125 while A. J. Foyt drove a superspeedway Buick to win it. Darrell Waltrip drove a Monte Carlo, edging Richard Petty's Magnum in the second; Waltrip said after the win, "Richard Petty has the fastest car here."

Race 1 results:

1. 51 - A.J. Foyt
2. 21 - David Pearson
3. 1 - Donnie Allison
4. 11 - Cale Yarborough
5. 9 - Bill Elliott
6. 30 - Tighe Scott
7. 41 - Grant Adcox
8. 98 - Roland Wlodyka
9. 67 - Buddy Arrington
10. 3 - Richard Childress

Race 2 results:

1. 88 - Darrell Waltrip
2. 43 - Richard Petty
3. 72 - Benny Parsons
4. 53 - Ron Hutcherson
5. 2 - Dave Marcis
6. 5 - Neil Bonnett
7. 48 - Al Holbert
8. 14 - Coo Coo Marlin
9. 92 - Skip Manning
10. 66 - Harry Gant

- Daytona 500 - Richard Petty led 26 laps in his 125, and his Magnum was pronounced the fastest car in Daytona by Waltrip after the Twins. Petty raced to the lead with Waltrip and David Pearson drafting him. By Lap 61 they had put all but Bobby Allison and Buddy Baker a lap down, but in Turn Four Petty blew a tire and all three hit the wall, then slid into the inside wall. Following the restart Benny Parsons spun out after blowing a tire while A. J. Foyt was drop-kicked by Lennie Pond and tumbled through the infield grass; he was cut from the car and hospitalized. Allison took the lead with ten to go and Buddy Baker blew his engine, leaving Allison uncontested for his first Cup win since 1975.
1. 15 - Bobby Allison
2. 11 - Cale Yarborough
3. 72 - Benny Parsons
4. 53 - Ron Hutcherson
5. 90 - Dick Brooks
6. 2 - Dave Marcis
7. 27 - Buddy Baker
8. 9 - Bill Elliott
9. 6 - Ferrel Harris
10. 54 - Lennie Pond

- Richmond 400 - Lennie Pond took the lead after Cale Yarborough led 69 laps and by the final 100 laps seemed in control of the race, but a blown tire put Benny Parsons into the lead and Parsons won by nearly three seconds over Pond. The 142 laps led were the most Pond had led in a race to date, surpassing the 113 laps led at the 1976 American 500.
1. 72 - Benny Parsons
2. 54 - Lennie Pond
3. 11 - Cale Yarborough
4. 88 - Darrell Waltrip
5. 90 - Dick Brooks
6. 15 - Bobby Allison
7. 2 - Dave Marcis
8. 3 - Richard Childress
9. 5 - Neil Bonnett
10. 30 - Tighe Scott

- Carolina 500 - Pearson reached a NASCAR milestone with his 100th Grand National win, running down Benny Parsons on a frigid raceday.
1. 21 - David Pearson
2. 15 - Bobby Allison
3. 72 - Benny Parsons
4. 43 - Richard Petty
5. 54 - Lennie Pond
6. 5 - Neil Bonnett
7. 92 - Skip Manning
8. 3 - Richard Childress
9. 67 - Buddy Arrington
10. 52 - Jimmy Means

- Atlanta 500 - NASCAR mandated larger spoiler sizes to combat the instability of the new racecars beginning with the Atlanta 500. Bobby Allison led 261 laps and put the entire field a lap down en route to the win. Darrell Waltrip blew his engine after 146 laps then publicly called out his pit crew; "Every time I pitted, I fell further behind."
1. 15 - Bobby Allison
2. 2 - Dave Marcis
3. 1 - Donnie Allison
4. 11 - Cale Yarborough
5. 54 - Lennie Pond
6. 90 - Dick Brooks
7. 41 - Grant Adcox
8. 49 - Connie Saylor
9. 05 - Bruce Hill
10. 68 - Janet Guthrie

- Southeastern 500 - After his crew repaired damage in an early crash, Darrell Waltrip drove to victory at Bristol and praised his crew for their work. It was the first of his record 12 Cup Series wins at the circuit.
1. 88 - Darrell Waltrip
2. 72 - Benny Parsons
3. 2 - Dave Marcis
4. 11 - Cale Yarborough
5. 54 - Lennie Pond
6. 3 - Richard Childress
7. 48 - James Hylton
8. 67 - Buddy Arrington
9. 30 - Tighe Scott
10. 8 - Ed Negre

- Rebel 500 - Benny Parsons grabbed his second win of the season, leading 83 laps after his team had to change engines before the race. "This one was a stick of dynamite," Parsons said of the new engine.
1. 72 - Benny Parsons
2. 88 - Darrell Waltrip
3. 54 - Lennie Pond
4. 2 - Dave Marcis
5. 43 - Richard Petty
6. 27 - Buddy Baker
7. 48 - Al Holbert
8. 92 - Skip Manning
9. 9 - Bill Elliott
10. 22 - Ricky Rudd

- Winston 500 - Rain delayed the Winston 500 from May 7 to Mother's Day May 14 - and also pushed back the scheduled Music City 420 at Nashville as well. The Talladega race saw 44 official lead changes as Cale Yarborough battled Darrell Waltrip, Richard Petty, and others; Benny Parsons and Dick Brooks stormed to the lead on the opening lap and Parsons led it, but fell out with clutch failure 121 laps in. Petty battled for the lead but on a late caution (for Lennie Pond's spin) his transmission acted up, and he lost five laps getting it fixed (he finished 11th). Yarborough drafted past Buddy Baker on the final lap for only his second win of the year.
1. 11 - Cale Yarborough
2. 27 - Buddy Baker
3. 51 - A.J. Foyt
4. 92 - Skip Manning
5. 41 - Grant Adcox
6. 9 - Bill Elliott
7. 6 - Ferrel Harris
8. 2 - Dave Marcis
9. 3 - Richard Childress
10. 48 - James Hylton

- World 600 - Darrell Waltrip, Donnie Allison, Bobby Allison, Cale Yarborough, David Pearson, and Benny Parsons dominated the 600 as the lead changed 43 times between them, the most competitive Charlotte race to that point. A last-lap crash knocked out Pearson and Parsons as Waltrip took the first of five 600s. Richard Petty finished a distant eighth and was more and more frustrated by the Dodge Magnum; it took several trips through the inspection line before he was cleared to race. Willy T. Ribbs, noted road racer, was slated to drive an ex-Bud Moore Torino purchased by Will Cronkite in the 600 but did not attend two scheduled test sessions then was arrested for driving the wrong way up a one-way street; Cronkite hired local racer Dale Earnhardt to drive the car.
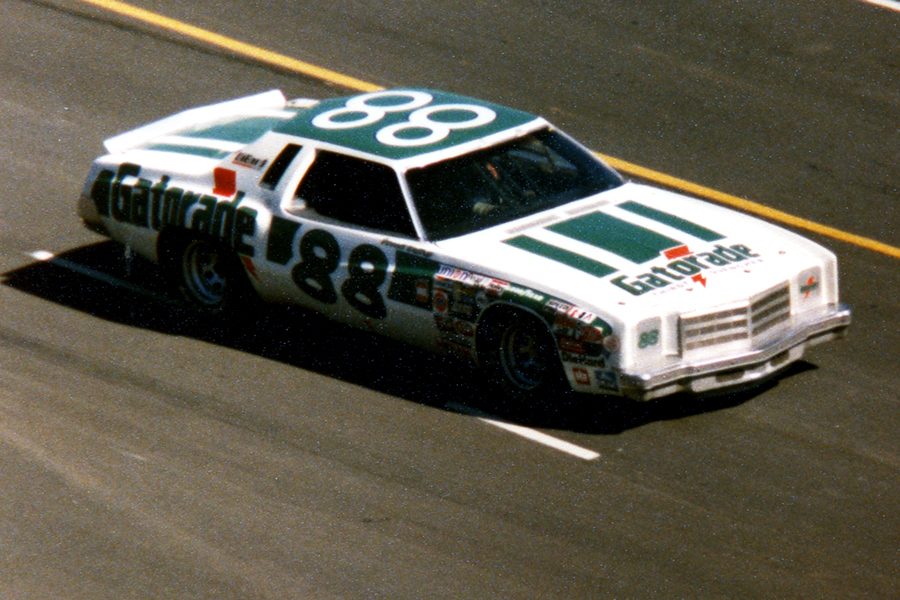
  Darrell Waltrip at the 1978 World 600.
1. 88 - Darrell Waltrip
2. 1 - Donnie Allison
3. 15 - Bobby Allison
4. 11 - Cale Yarborough
5. 21 - David Pearson
6. 72 - Benny Parsons
7. 27 - Buddy Baker
8. 43 - Richard Petty
9. 14 - Sterling Marlin
10. 05 - Bruce Hill

- Music City 420 - Yarborough stormed past pole-sitter Lennie Pond and led all 420 laps, putting the entire field two laps or more down. It was the last wire-to-wire win in a Cup race until 2000. Cale also took the point lead from Benny Parsons.
1. 11 - Cale Yarborough
2. 54 - Lennie Pond
3. 43 - Richard Petty
4. 2 - Dave Marcis
5. 5 - Neil Bonnett
6. 41 - Grant Adcox
7. 30 - Tighe Scott
8. 3 - Richard Childress
9. 67 - Buddy Arrington
10. 40 - D.K. Ulrich

- Gabriel 400 - Cale's domination of the season continued as he made up a lap on the race's only yellow (at Lap 108) and led the last 59 laps to an easy win. "Surely he must have a big engine," Pearson said after the race, while Glen Wood said, "He's made up some laps in mysterious fashion."
1. 11 - Cale Yarborough
2. 21 - David Pearson
3. 72 - Benny Parsons
4. 2 - Dave Marcis
5. 1 - Donnie Allison
6. 43 - Richard Petty
7. 90 - Dick Brooks
8. 27 - Buddy Baker
9. 22 - Ricky Rudd
10. 3 - Richard Childress

- Firecracker 400 - Cale Yarborough spun out while drafting David Pearson (who himself lost a lap with a flat tire earlier in the race) with some 33 laps to go; he recovered and his last-lap attempt was foiled when Pearson boxed him behind Baxter Price and grabbed a three-length win, his record fifth in the event.
1. 21 - David Pearson
2. 11 - Cale Yarborough
3. 88 - Darrell Waltrip
4. 43 - Richard Petty
5. 54 - Lennie Pond
6. 2 - Dave Marcis
7. 96 - Dale Earnhardt
8. 81 - Ferrel Harris
9. 9 - Bill Elliott
10. 30 - Tighe Scott

- Nashville 420 - Yarborough's domination of the season continued as he led 411 laps and finished two laps ahead of Waltrip.
1. 11 - Cale Yarborough
2. 88 - Darrell Waltrip
3. 3 - Richard Childress
4. 2 - Dave Marcis
5. 70 - J.D. McDuffie
6. 72 - Benny Parsons
7. 15 - Bobby Allison
8. 90 - Dick Brooks
9. 81 - Ferrel Harris
10. 25 - Ronnie Thomas

- Coca-Cola 500 - Darrell Waltrip grabbed his second big-track win of the season, beating David Pearson by nearly a second. Richard Petty led briefly but fell out with engine failure following announcement that he would park the Dodge Magnum after the Talladega 500 in favor of a Chevrolet he'd purchased from Cecil Gordon.
1. 88 - Darrell Waltrip
2. 21 - David Pearson
3. 15 - Bobby Allison
4. 2 - Dave Marcis
5. 27 - Buddy Baker
6. 22 - Ricky Rudd
7. 90 - Dick Brooks
8. 30 - Tighe Scott
9. 47 - Satch Worley
10. 70 - J.D. McDuffie

- Talladega 500 - Cale and Buddy Baker fought it out as the lead changed 67 times (a motorsports record until 1984) overall. Baker's engine failure left Yarborough seemingly alone but the final eleven laps became a showdown between Lennie Pond and Donnie Allison; on the final lap Bill Elliott's blown tire slowed Allison enough for Pond to storm to his only career Winston Cup win. Richard Petty fought for the lead but ran out of fuel past halfway and finished two laps down in seventh in his final race in a Dodge.
1. 54 - Lennie Pond
2. 1 - Donnie Allison
3. 72 - Benny Parsons
4. 11 - Cale Yarborough
5. 21 - David Pearson
6. 15 - Bobby Allison
7. 43 - Richard Petty
8. 5 - Neil Bonnett
9. 90 - Dick Brooks
10. 30 - Tighe Scott

- Champion Spark Plug 400 - Petty debuted a Chevrolet he'd purchased from Cecil Gordon and ran strong in the 400 before a blown tire sent him hard into the guardrail with ten laps to go. Darrell Waltrip pitted under the yellow; Dave Marcis ran dry and had to be pushed by D.K. Ulrich; Pearson got four tires under the yellow and when the green and white flags flew he blew past Waltrip; Cale Yarborough grabbed second while Marcis finished fourth.
1. 21 - David Pearson
2. 11 - Cale Yarborough
3. 88 - Darrell Waltrip
4. 2 - Dave Marcis
5. 15 - Bobby Allison
6. 90 - Dick Brooks
7. 70 - J.D. McDuffie
8. 54 - Lennie Pond
9. 5 - Neil Bonnett
10. 8 - Ferrel Harris

- Volunteer 500 - Cale led 327 laps en route to the win, but the story of the race was an ugly set-to between pole-sitter Lennie Pond and Darrell Waltrip; Waltrip had declared before the race that he would drive the Ranier Racing car Pond presently drove in 1979 and would buy out his contract (running through 1982) with DiGard; on Lap 104 Waltrip sideswiped Pond's Chevy, and three laps later a tire blew, sending Pond hard into Waltrip; Pond was later eliminated when he collided with Cecil Gordon and climbed the frontstretch wall ("It was just an accident," Pond said of the crash with Gordon, "Cecil didn't see me"). The race was scheduled to Saturday night by new track promoter Gary Baker.
1. 11 - Cale Yarborough
2. 72 - Benny Parsons
3. 88 - Darrell Waltrip
4. 90 - Dick Brooks
5. 43 - Richard Petty
6. 2 - Dave Marcis
7. 3 - Richard Childress
8. 70 - J.D. McDuffie
9. 40 - D.K. Ulrich
10. 17 - Roger Hamby

- Southern 500 - Cale led 203 laps en route to his fourth Southern 500 win, while finishing a distant fourth was Terry Labonte, hired to drive Billy Hagan's car after Skip Manning, citing lack of sponsorship, left the team.
1. 11 - Cale Yarborough
2. 88 - Darrell Waltrip
3. 43 - Richard Petty
4. 92 - Terry Labonte
5. 15 - Bobby Allison
6. 9 - Bill Elliott
7. 48 - James Hylton
8. 67 - Buddy Arrington
9. 25 - Ronnie Thomas
10. 72 - Benny Parsons

- Capital City 400 - Darrell Waltrip's controversial career took a major popularity hit after winning at Richmond Fairgrounds Raceway. He spun out winless Neil Bonnett, the race's defending champion, and was booed loudly by the crowd.
1. 88 - Darrell Waltrip
2. 15 - Bobby Allison
3. 5 - Neil Bonnett
4. 11 - Cale Yarborough
5. 90 - Dick Brooks
6. 72 - Benny Parsons
7. 92 - Terry Labonte
8. 70 - J.D. McDuffie
9. 2 - Dave Marcis
10. 17 - Roger Hamby

- Delaware 500 - Bobby Allison grabbed his first win since March, but his postrace interview centered on a trip to the Mayo Clinic days before the race. J.D. McDuffie won his only career pole, doing so on McCreary tires, a first for the tire company.
1. 15 - Bobby Allison
2. 11 - Cale Yarborough
3. 27 - Buddy Baker
4. 21 - David Pearson
5. 88 - Darrell Waltrip
6. 90 - Dick Brooks
7. 54 - Lennie Pond
8. 2 - Dave Marcis
9. 1 - Donnie Allison
10. 92 - Dick May

- Wilkes 400 - Unaided by yellows, Cale Yarborough erased a two-lap deficit and led the final 19 laps for his ninth win of the season.
1. 11 - Cale Yarborough
2. 88 - Darrell Waltrip
3. 15 - Bobby Allison
4. 43 - Richard Petty
5. 5 - Neil Bonnett
6. 72 - Benny Parsons
7. 54 - Lennie Pond
8. 2 - Dave Marcis
9. 90 - Dick Brooks
10. 30 - Tighe Scott

- National 500 - Richard Petty raced to the lead and battled Bobby Allison and company, looking for his first win of the season; Petty's Chevrolet led 102 laps but fell out when the ignition failed after 220 laps. Allison won by nearly a lap over Darrell Waltrip. David Pearson led 35 laps after winning his 11th straight Charlotte pole but fell out of contention late, finishing fifth. The lead changed 40 times among nine drivers.
1. 15 - Bobby Allison
2. 88 - Darrell Waltrip
3. 2 - Dave Marcis
4. 1 - Donnie Allison
5. 21 - David Pearson
6. 54 - Lennie Pond
7. 14 - Coo Coo Marlin
8. 57 - Dick May
9. 3 - Richard Childress
10. 90 - Dick Brooks

- American 500 - By winning this race, Cale Yarborough clinches his third straight championship with two races remaining in the season, even with second place in the title hunt Bobby Allison finishing a strong second in the race.
1. 11 - Cale Yarborough
2. 15 - Bobby Allison
3. 88 - Darrell Waltrip
4. 72 - Benny Parsons
5. 90 - Dick Brooks
6. 43 - Richard Petty
7. 54 - Lennie Pond
8. 2 - Dave Marcis
9. 67 - Buddy Arrington
10. 3 - Richard Childress

- Dixie 500 - NASCAR suffered an embarrassing scoring breakdown as Donnie Allison made up a lap and stormed past Richard Petty and Dave Marcis with three laps to go. Allison was flagged the winner, but NASCAR announced scoring showed Petty beating Marcis by a wheel for the win. Scorer Earl Sappenfield, however, thought something still wasn't right; chief scorer Morris Metcalfe was told by one of his scorers - 16-year-old Brian France - that Donnie had in fact run a lap that hadn't been properly scored, and was thus the winner. When the announcement was made that Allison indeed had won, Bill France Jr. said, "First we need to wipe the egg off our face." Finishing fourth - following a strong second to Bobby Allison in a 300-mile Late Model Sportsman race at Charlotte the previous month - was Dale Earnhardt in a second Rod Osterlund car.
1. 1 - Donnie Allison
2. 43 - Richard Petty
3. 2 - Dave Marcis
4. 98 - Dale Earnhardt
5. 72 - Benny Parsons
6. 15 - Bobby Allison
7. 12 - Harry Gant
8. 11 - Cale Yarborough
9. 22 - Ricky Rudd
10. 14 - Coo Coo Marlin

- Los Angeles Times 500 - Cale Yarborough had to pit on the pace lap to correct ignition problems; he joined the field as the leaders were on the backstretch of the opening lap. The lead officially changed 11 times in the opening 21 laps and twice a lap several times; ultimately the lead changed 30 official times. Bobby Allison led 134 laps while Richard Petty was his strongest challenger, leading 30 laps before his engine failed. Allison took the win with Yarborough second. Dave Marcis finished 27th; his team owner Rod Osterlund entered two cars as he'd done at Atlanta; to preserve the rookie of the year status for 1979 for Dale Earnhardt, West Coast ace Jimmy Insolo started the race in the second Osterlund car and Earnhardt drove in relief, finishing seventh. The hiring of Earnhardt upset Marcis, who was already upset with team manager Roland Wlodyka; Marcis disliked the rookie's attitude coming into the series and left Osterlund's team; Osterlund thus named Earnhardt full-time driver. This was the last race without Terry Labonte in the field until the 2000 Brickyard 400.
1. 15 - Bobby Allison
2. 11 - Cale Yarborough
3. 1 - Donnie Allison
4. 27 - Buddy Baker
5. 88 - Darrell Waltrip
6. 54 - Lennie Pond
7. 98 - Jimmy Insolo
8. 72 - Benny Parsons
9. 90 - Dick Brooks
10. 51 - Jim Thirkettle

== Full Drivers’ Championship ==
(key) Bold – Pole position awarded by time. Italics – Pole position set by owner's points. * – Most laps led. ** – All laps led.

Pos.	Driver	RIV	DAY	RCH	CAR	ATL	BRI	DAR	NWS	MAR	TAL	DOV	CLT	NSV	RIV	MCH	DAY	NSV	POC	TAL	MCH	BRI	DAR	RCH	DOV	MAR	NWS	CLT	CAR	ATL	ONT	Pts
1	Cale Yarborough	1*	**2**	3	18	**4**	4	15*	26	16	**1***	2	4	1**	5*	1	**2**	1*	26	**4***	2*	1*	1*	4	2	1*	1	22	**1***	**8**	**2**	4841
2	Bobby Allison	30	1	6	2	1*	21	**14**	6	6	38	8	3	21	3	24	27	7	3	6	5	22	5	2	1*	7	3	1*	2	6	1*	4367
3	Darrell Waltrip	23	28	4	21	35	1	2	1*	1*	22	6*	1*	26	16	28*	3	2	1*	34	3	3	2	**1**	5	2	**2***	2	3	28	5	4362
4	Benny Parsons	2	3	1	3	13	2*	1	**3**	15	31	4	6	20	1	3	26	6	**29**	3	13	2	10	6	26	3	6	28	4	5	8	4350
5	Dave Marcis	5	6	7	11	2	3	4	5	4	8	15	32	4	4	4	6	4	4	14	4	6	35	9	8	8	8	3	8	3	27	4335
6	Richard Petty	16	33	22	4	26	25	5	2	3	11	7	8	3	2	6	4	23	30	7	14	5	3	20	27	6	4	27	6	2	34	3949
7	Lennie Pond	DNQ	10	2*	5	5	5	3	4	**18**	21	3	33	**2**	7	25	5	**26**		1	8	**26**	26	12	7	**5**	7	6	7	39	6	3794
8	Dick Brooks	15	5	5	28	6	19	35	8	27	15	9	19	14	26	7	36	8	7	9	6	4	25	5	6	13	9	10	5	12	9	3769
9	Buddy Arrington	11	16	15	9	14	8	18	11	5	12	13	15	9	18	12	34	12	14	15	12	12	8	16	22	10	13	14	9	16	35	3626
10	Richard Childress	20	13	8	8	15	6	28	10	8	9	33	20	8	15	20	24	3	24	25	31	7	27	11	12	12	14	9	10	30	11	3566
11	J. D. McDuffie	28	30	27	25	16	28	11	7	26	40	34	22	12	24	13	12	5	10	17	7	8	20	8	**33**	22	11	11	12	14	26	3255
12	Neil Bonnett	4	27	**9**	**6**	33	**26**	32	24	2	39	5	35	5	10	36	23	28	36	8	9	20	34	3*	29	4	5	30	31	34	37	3129
13	Tighe Scott	18	11	10	34	34	9	34	25	25	13	11	31	7	11	11	10	22	8	10	19	23	23	27	25	29	10	12	21	22	DNQ	3110
14	Frank Warren	13	24	14	12	19	13	17	22	22	29	27	23	16	29	20	17	13	18	33	24	15	12	23	21	21	24	25	16	33	23	3036
15	Dick May		18	29	17		12	36	18	28	23	21	13	18	21	19	16	18	11	16	11	25	38	15	10	17	25	8	11	19	31	2936
16	Jimmy Means		35	12	10	32	23	12	14	10	26	17	37	30		15	13	24	13	32	15	19	11	13	32	23	23		13	23	22	2756
17	David Pearson	**3**	34		1*	21		29		21	35	1	**5**		**27**	**2**	1*		2	5	**1**		**28**		4	25		**5**	24	32	38	2756
18	Ronnie Thomas **(R)**	DNQ		18	13	24	20	31	21	20	14	32	30	15	25	18	25	10	33	24	26	11	9	14	11	16	19		33	15	30	2733
19	Cecil Gordon	25	21	17	22	17	18	33	17	9	25	25		19	12	17	32	19	40		17	13		17	14	30	26		15	18	15	2641
20	Tommy Gale		25	23	14	22	22	21	27	17	16	18	24			21	15		16	20	16	21	13	24	17	27	17	31	18	31	17	2639
21	Roger Hamby **(R)**	DNQ	15	25	27	37	17	13	23	14	19	31		23		27		17	27	36	30	10	19	10	18	24	12	18	26	11	12	2617
22	D. K. Ulrich	10	17	16	26	11	11	20	13	13	17	16	29	10	14	14	19	20	25	19	23	9	29								DNQ	2452
23	Baxter Price **(R)**		DNQ	20	23		16	16	19	11	20	22	25	17		26	20	27	28	23	21	16	15	22	23	19	21	29	19		DNQ	2418
24	Buddy Baker		7*		33	27		6			2	**23**	7			8	37		5	28	36		32		3	26		34	22	21*	4	2130
25	Donnie Allison		39		31	3		23			24		2			5	33		35	2	29		24		9			4	20	1	3	1993
26	James Hylton			11	15		7		12	7	10			11					39	41	35	17	7	18	34	11	16	15	14		16	1965
27	Gary Myers		Wth						20	30		26	18	28		23		15	19	21	20	14	14	21	20	15	22		17	27	24	1915
28	Ed Negre	DNQ	DNQ	21	29	25	10		15	19	28	35		27		35					18	29	21	30	15	18	20	21	35	26	21	1857
29	Skip Manning	21	12	13	7	23	15	8	9	23	4	12	26			16	39			38								38		25		1802
30	Grant Adcox		14		30	7		25			5		11	6		22	22	11		22			31					33		38		1467
31	Ricky Rudd		37					10			27		28			9	21		6	39	28		36					23	25	9	DNQ	1260
32	Bruce Hill		DNQ			9					36	19	10	25		29	40	14	17	35	34		40					13		36	DNQ	1214
33	Bill Elliott		8			38		9			6		14				9			13			6					17		37		1176
34	Al Holbert **(R)**	8	29			31		7				10	38			31	30		12	30			QL		13					35		1142
35	Ferrel Harris		9								7						8	9	20	11	10	18		28	36	20			34	20	19	1066
36	Coo Coo Marlin		26			39					41			22			38			26			30					7		10		765
37	Blackie Wangerin **(R)**		36			29		19			30					32	31		15	40	25		33									760
38	Bobby Wawak		DNQ				29			12		28	DNQ	13					34			28	37						27		DNQ	680
39	Terry Labonte																						4	7		9		24		13		659
40	Ralph Jones		Wth		20									24				21				27	18		30					29		634
41	Janet Guthrie		DNQ			10											11		31	29	27							35			13	592
42	Earle Canavan		DNQ	24	24			22				20				33				31	32		39		16						DNQ	559
43	Dale Earnhardt												17				7			12			16							4		558
44	Roland Wlodyka	DNQ	19	26	32	18	27						21																			549
45	Joe Frasson		DNQ		16			24									14						17						23			533
46	Nelson Oswald		DNQ	30								38	DNQ									24		25	24		18					501
47	Joe Mihalic		31		19		24	26				30	DNQ						32													419
48	Jim Thirkettle	17													9																10	389
49	Jimmy Insolo	7													32																7	369
50	Satch Worley											14	DNQ				18		9							14						368
51	John Kennedy	DNQ	Wth						29	29			DNQ			30											27			40		350
52	Bill Schmitt	32													8																14	350
53	Harry Gant		41										36													28		19		7		325
54	Connie Saylor					8							34															16				318
55	Richard White	24													19																18	308
56	Chuck Bown					30		30		24	33																					301
57	Nestor Peles		DNQ									24							21						19							297
58	Rick McCray	12													13																39	297
59	John Utsman		DNQ			40					32		16															32				292
60	Joey Arrington																				22			19	31							273
61	Joe Booher								18							34			22													273
62	John Borneman	27													23																25	264
63	Rocky Moran	26													30																20	261
64	Jimmy Lee Capps		23	19	35																											258
65	Dave Dion											40							38					26	28							256
66	Ray Elder	34													6																40	254
67	Elmo Langley											37						16											29			243
68	Woody Fisher		DNQ	28	36	20																										237
69	Sterling Marlin												9					25														226
70	Ron Hutcherson		4								34		39																			221
71	Jerry Jolly		20										40															36				201
72	Junior Miller																										15		28			197
73	Bill Hollar		Wth						28			36																	36			189
74	Norm Palmer	14													35																DNQ	179
75	Ernie Stierly	19													31																DNQ	176
76	Morgan Shepherd		40										12																			170
77	Harry Goularte	DNQ													20																33	167
78	Mel Larson																				33										29	140
79	Roy Smith	9																													DNQ	138
80	Chuck Wahl	DNQ													28																36	134
81	Jim Vandiver		38										27																			131
82	Sam Sommers		DNQ			12		27																								127
83	Wayne Morgan									DNQ		39												29								122
84	Hershel McGriff	6													17																	112
85	Marty Robbins																			18												109
86	Glenn Jarrett																											20				103
87	Bob Burcham																						22									97
88	Don Graham														22																DNQ	97
89	Jack Simpson	22																													DNQ	97
90	Butch Mock																											26		24		85
91	Steve Moore																			27												82
92	Don Noel														33																28	79
93	Billy McGinnis					28																										79
94	Vince Giaformaggio	29													QL																	76
95	Richard Waters													29																		76
96	Raymond Williams																29															76
97	Bill Green																					30										73
98	Johnny Halford																												30			73
99	Don Puskarich	31																													DNQ	70
100	Steve Pfeifer	DNQ													DNQ																32	67
101	Eddie Bradshaw	33																														64
102	Bill Baker	DNQ													34																	61
103	Louis Gatto									DNQ															35							58
104	Gary Johnson	35													DNQ																	58
105	Butch Hartman		Wth			36																										55
106	Bill Dennis																											37				52
107	Jocko Maggiacomo	DNQ	Wth																37													52
108	Jabe Thomas																								37							52
109	Dick Trickle																											39				46
110	Bobby Fisher																	29										40				43
111	Claude Ballot-Léna		22								18						35			37												
112	A. J. Foyt		32								3																					
113	Lynn Carroll						14																									
114	Dave Watson																													17	DNQ	
115	Kenny Brightbill																		23													
116	Paul Fess																28															
117	Greg Heller											29																				
118	Charlie Blanton																												32			
119	Frank Hill										37																					
120	Pappy Pryor	DNQ																														
121	John Soares	DNQ																														
122	Evan Noyes Jr.	DNQ																														
123	Glenn Francis	DNQ																														
124	Bob Switzer	DNQ																														
125	Mike Kempton	DNQ																														
126	Bob Brown	DNQ																														
127	Mike Brockman	DNQ													DNQ																	
128	John Dineen	DNQ	Wth												DNQ																	
129	Dick Whalen	DNQ													DNQ																DNQ	
130	Ron McGee	DNQ																													DNQ	
131	Dick Kranzler	DNQ																													DNQ	
132	Bennie Vaught	DNQ																													DNQ	
133	Steve Stolarek		DNQ																													
134	Tommy Robbs		DNQ																													
135	Tom Frank		DNQ																													
136	Claude Aubin		DNQ																													
137	Earl Ross		DNQ																													
138	Terry Link		DNQ																													
139	Robin Schildknecht									DNQ																						
140	Keith Nebern									DNQ																						
141	Hal Callentine														DNQ																	
142	Mike Roche																														DNQ	
143	Ross Kusah																														DNQ	
144	John Krebs																														DNQ	
145	Billy Hagan																														DNQ	
146	Chris Monoleos																														DNQ	
147	Johnny Kieper																														DNQ	
148	Fred Lovell		Wth																													
149	A. J. Reno		Wth																													
150	Larry LaMay		Wth																													
151	Paul Dean Holt		Wth																													
152	Travis Tiller		Wth																													
153	Jim Bray		Wth																													
154	Keith Davis										Wth																					
155	Hoss Ellington		QL																													
156	Walter Ballard									QL								30														
Pos.	Driver	RIV	DAY	RCH	CAR	ATL	BRI	DAR	NWS	MAR	TAL	DOV	CLT	NSV	RIV	MCH	DAY	NSV	POC	TAL	MCH	BRI	DAR	RCH	DOV	MAR	NWS	CLT	CAR	ATL	ONT	Pts

== See also ==
- 1978 NASCAR Winston West Series
