= 1976 Pocono 500 =

(United States) 1976 Pocono 500
Race details
- 5th round of the 1976 USAC Championship Car season
- Date: June 27, 1976
- Official name: 1976 Schaefer 500
- Location: Long Pond, Pennsylvania
- Course: Permanent racing facility 2.5 mi / 4.023 km
- Distance: 200 laps 500 mi / 804.672 km
- Weather: Temperatures up to 84 °F (29 °C); wind speeds up to 15 miles per hour (24 km/h)

Pole position
- Driver: (United States) Johnny Parsons (Tassi Vattis)
- Time: Drew for Position

Podium
- First: (United States) Al Unser (Vel's Parnelli Jones Racing)
- Second: (United States) Mike Mosley (Jerry O'Connell Racing)
- Third: (United States) Wally Dallenbach Sr. (Patrick Racing)

The 1976 Pocono 500, the 6th running of the event, was held at the Pocono Raceway in Long Pond, Pennsylvania, on Sunday, June 27, 1976. Branded as the 1976 Schaefer 500 for sponsorship reasons, it was won by Al Unser. The race is notable as Janet Guthrie became the first woman to start a 500 mile Indy car race.

== Background ==
Johnny Rutherford won the 1976 Indianapolis 500 one month before the Pocono 500. It was Rutherford's second 500 victory.

== Practice ==
For 1976, the schedule of events for the Pocono 500 was shortened. Now, two days of practice began on Friday and Sunday was the sole qualification day.

In Friday's opening practice, A. J. Foyt ran eight total laps in the morning and posted the fastest speed at 181.305 mph. He then put the car in the garage and left the track at lunchtime. Gordon Johncock and Johnny Rutherford tied for second fastest with a pair of laps at 181.268 mph.

Janet Guthrie suffered from mechanical issues and posted a fastest lap of 165.623 mph in her 20-lap refresher test. Larry Cannon was the only car to spin during the session.

Saturday's practice began at 9 a.m. and extended until noon. After a lunch break, practice ran from 1 p.m. - 6 p.m.

Foyt ran a mere 10 laps in practice and posted the fastest speed of the day at 185.950 mph. Al Unser was second fastest at 185.567 mph. Johnny Rutherford was third fastest at 182.852 mph.

Janet Guthrie was the slowest car in practice with a speed of 168.823 mph. Next slowest was Bob Harkey at 169.555 mph.

== Time Trials and Draw For The Pole ==
On Sunday, time trials were scheduled from 11 a.m. to 6 p.m. Dick Simon and Al Loquasto were the only two cars to post qualifying speeds before rains fell.

Because of continued forecasted rain for the following days, and all 35 cars still needing to qualify, it was decided to set the starting lineup by random draw. A formula was devised to give the better cars and teams a fair advantage.

Starting positions 1 through 16 were reserved for drivers who were former series champions, had won 500 mile races, or were in the top-10 in points in 1976 or 1975, plus the Sunday qualifiers of Simon and Loquasto. All other drivers drew for positions 17 through 30.

Johnny Parsons Jr's name was drawn for the pole position. Second place went to Bill Vukovich Jr, Mario Andretti was picked third. Because he was fastest of the two cars that posted speeds, Dick Simon was given the $1,500 prize reserved for the fastest qualifier. Simon's name was picked for the fourth position.

Janet Guthrie benefitted the most from the draw. Being the slowest car in practice meant qualifying on speed would have been difficult in time trials. Guthrie was picked for the 22nd starting spot, making her the first woman to start a 500 mile Indy car race.

The five cars that did not draw spots in the top 30 were forced to qualify for the final three spots on Thursday. An option was given that the starting field would be expanded and all 35 cars would be allowed to start if every team signed a petition in support, but some teams declined. Of the five cars left to qualify, Bob Harkey ran the fastest speed at 173.963 mph. Jan Opperman was second fastest at 172.678 mph while Larry Dickson earned the last spot at 171.054. Bill Puterbaugh and Bobby Olivero failed to qualify for the race.

== Race ==
Indianapolis Motor Speedway owner, Tony Hulman, annually gave the command to start engines at Pocono. However, due to an illness, Hulman sent his 16 year-old grandson, Tony George, to deliver the command in his place. As this was the first time a woman competed in a 500 mile Indy car race, there were questions over whether the traditional "gentlemen start your engines" command would be given, or changed to include Guthrie. George delivered the traditional command as instructed by his grandfather. Pocono track owner, Joseph Mattioli, later recalled, "all the women wanted to kill him. And I found out later, that's what Tony Hulman told him to say."

Seeking his first win at Pocono, Mario Andretti from third on the grid, got a fast start and beat Johnny Parsons and Bill Vukovich into turn one to take the lead. Eldon Rasmussen brought out the caution flag on lap one when he hit the turn two wall. Rasmussen was able to continue.

Janet Guthrie pulled into the pits under caution on lap three with a loose windshield. Guthrie was plagued by mechanical problems with the engine repeatedly overheating and the clutch failed. Guthrie retired after completing 89 laps when the crew discovered the transmission case was broken. Guthrie finished 24th and earned $4,210. As she walked back to the garage, spectators gave her a standing ovation.

When the race restarted on lap seven after Rasmussen's crash, A.J. Foyt took the lead, going for his second consecutive at Pocono. On lap 17, Salt Walther suffered a pit fire caused by a fuel leak. His crew spent 40 laps repairing the car.

Al Unser climbed from his 16th starting spot and took the lead from Foyt in turn one on lap 19.

After leading 12 laps, AJ Foyt blew an engine in turn two on lap 31 and retired from the race.

On lap 58, Unser experienced a long pit stop when the pneumatic jacks on his car failed and the crew needed to use a mechanical jack. On lap 76, Unser cut a tire on the frontstretch and had to limp around track. Unser fell nearly two laps behind the leaders.

While Al Unser had problems, Mario Andretti led 45 laps. On lap 88, Al Loquasto spun in turn one to bring out a caution. Unser passed Andretti on lap 104 to get back on the lead lap. When John Martin blew an engine on lap 114, Unser was able to catch up to the cars on the lead lap. On lap 122, Unser passed Andretti to retake the lead.

After the last pit stop with 22 laps to go, Andretti was in third position, and close behind Wally Dallenbach, when he broke a link on the sway bar and caused a poor handling car. With two laps remaining, Andretti entered the pits with a burned piston and finished fifth with only 198 laps completed.

Unser beat Mike Mosley by 3.4 seconds to claim his first Pocono 500 win. Unser led 109 laps and took home $84,360 in purse money.

Unser's win was the first victory for the eight-cylinder Cosworth DFX engine, which would soon dominate Indy car racing over the next several years.

== Box score ==
Finish	Grid	No	Name	Entrant	Chassis	Engine	Laps	Time/Status	Led	Points
1	16	21	(United States) Al Unser	Vel's Parnelli Jones Racing	Parnelli VPJ6B	Cosworth DFX	200	3:28:52.880	109	1000
2	6	12	(United States) Mike Mosley	Jerry O'Connell Racing	Eagle	Offenhauser	200	+3.400	14	800
3	14	40	(United States) Wally Dallenbach	Patrick Racing	Wildcat Mk2	DGS	200	Running	7	700
4	15	2	(United States) Johnny Rutherford	Team McLaren	McLaren M16E	Offenhauser	200	Running	1	600
5	3	6	(United States) Mario Andretti	Penske Racing	McLaren M16C/D	Offenhauser	198	Flagged	45	500
6	12	36	(United States) Roger McCluskey	James Bidwell	McLaren	Offenhauser	198	Flagged	0	400
7	13	68	(United States) Tom Sneva	Penske Racing	McLaren M16C/D	Offenhauser	197	Flagged	0	300
8	11	92	(United States) Steve Krisiloff	Vatis Enterprises	Eagle	Offenhauser	196	Flagged	0	250
9	25	23	(United States) George Snider	Leader Card Racers	Eagle	Offenhauser	195	Flagged	0	200
10	4	17	(United States) Dick Simon	Vollstedt Enterprises	Vollstedt	Offenhauser	195	Flagged	0	150
11	33	44	(United States) Larry Dickson	Dick Simon Racing	Eagle	Foyt	188	Flagged	0	100
12	31	96	(United States) Bob Harkey	J. C. Agajanian	King	Offenhauser	187	Flagged	0	50
13	28	65	(United States) Lee Kunzman	Pat Santello	Eagle	Offenhauser	186	Flagged	0	0
14	7	48	(United States) Pancho Carter	All American Racers	Eagle	Offenhauser	183	Suspension	8	0
15	9	86	(United States) Al Loquasto	Loquasto Racing	McLaren	Offenhauser	183	Flagged	0	0
16	24	63	(United States) Larry McCoy	James Bidwell	Rascar	Offenhauser	159	Flagged	0	0
17	20	8	(United States) Todd Gibson	Routh Meat Packaging	Eagle	Offenhauser	156	Oil leak	0	0
18	30	77	(United States) Salt Walther	Dayton-Walther	McLaren M16C/D	Offenhauser	151	Flagged	0	0
19	32	42	(United States) Jan Opperman	Mergard Racing	Eagle	Offenhauser	145	Flagged	0	0
20	26	58	(Canada) Eldon Rasmussen	Rasmussen Racing	Rascar	Offenhauser	115	Brakes	0	0
21	17	98	(United States) John Martin	J. C. Agajanian	King	Offenhauser	113	Engine	0	0
22	1	93	(United States) Johnny Parsons	Vatis Enterprises	Eagle	Offenhauser	110	Valve	0	0
23	29	38	(United States) Bill Simpson	Bill Simpson	Eagle	Offenhauser	93	Gearbox	0	0
24	22	27	(United States) Janet Guthrie	Vollstedt Enterprises	Vollstedt	Offenhauser	89	Gearbox	0	0
25	18	19	(United States) Spike Gehlhausen	Carl Gehlhausen	McLaren M16	Offenhauser	74	Engine	0	0
26	2	5	(United States) Bill Vukovich II	Alex Morales Motorsports	Eagle	Offenhauser	60	Gear	0	0
27	8	20	(United States) Gordon Johncock	Patrick Racing	Wildcat Mk2	DGS	54	Engine	4	0
28	27	97	(United States) Sheldon Kinser	J. C. Agajanian	King	Offenhauser	47	Overheating	0	0
29	19	24	(United States) Tom Bigelow	Leader Card Racers	Eagle	Offenhauser	43	Ignition	0	0
30	23	69	(United States) Larry Cannon	Hoffman Racing	Eagle	Offenhauser	37	Piston	0	0
31	5	14	(United States) A. J. Foyt	A. J. Foyt Enterprises	Coyote	Foyt	31	Engine	12	0
32	10	3	(United States) Bobby Unser	Fletcher Racing Team	Eagle	Offenhauser	25	Piston	0	0
33	21	45	(United States) Gary Bettenhausen	Don Gerhardt	Eagle	Offenhauser	16	Steering	0	0

== Broadcasting ==
For the first time, the Pocono 500 was broadcast by CBS Sports Spectacular, aired six days after the race, on July 3. The broadcasting team was Ken Squier, David Hobbs, and Ned Jarrett reporting from the pits.
