= 1976 USAC Championship Car season =

Sports season

- USAC National Championship Trail

Season
- Races: 13
- Start date: March 14
- End date: November 7

Awards
- National champion: (United States) Gordon Johncock
- Indianapolis 500 winner: (United States) Johnny Rutherford

The 1976 USAC Championship Car season consisted of 13 races, beginning in Avondale, Arizona on March 14 and concluding at the same location on November 7. The USAC National Champion was Gordon Johncock and the Indianapolis 500 winner was Johnny Rutherford.

== Entrants ==
(partial list)

Team	Chassis	Engine	Drivers	Rounds
(United States) A.J. Foyt Enterprises	Coyote	Foyt	(United States) A.J. Foyt	1-8, 10-12
(United States) All American Racers	Eagle	Offenhauser	(United States) Pancho Carter	1-5, 10-12
(United States) Bruce Crower	Eagle	Offenhauser	(United States) Tom Sneva	13
(United States) Bob Fletcher	Eagle	Offenhauser	(United States) Bobby Unser	1-5, 9-13
(United States) Alex Morales	Eagle	Offenhauser	(United States) Bob Vukovich II	1-5, 7-10, 12-13
(United States) Jerry O"Connell Racing	Eagle	Offenhauser	(United States) Mike Mosley	All
(United States) Leader Card Racing	Eagle	Offenhauser	(United States) Tom Bigelow	All
(United States) Lindsey Hopkins Racing	Hopkins	Offenhauser	(United States) Roger McCluskey	2-3, 5-13
(United Kingdom) McLaren	McLaren	Offenhauser	(United States) Johnny Rutherford	All
(United States) Patrick Racing	Eagle (3-5); Wildcat (1, 6-13)	Offenhauser (3-6) (DGS (1, 6-13)	(United States) Gordon Johncock	All
(United States) Patrick Racing	Wildcat	DGS	(United States) Wally Dallenbach	All
(United States) Team Penske	McLaren	Offenhauser	(United States) Tom Sneva	1-11
(United States) Team Penske	McLaren	Offenhauser	(United States) Mario Andretti	3, 5, 12-13
(United States) Vatis Enterprises	Eagle	Offenhauser	(United States) Johnny Parsons	All
(United States) Vel's Parnelli Jones Racing	Parnelli	Cosworth	(United States) Al Unser	1, 3-13

== Schedule and results ==
All races running on Oval/Speedway.

Rnd	Date	Race name	Track	Location	Pole position	Winning driver
1	March 14	Jimmy Bryan 150	Phoenix International Raceway	Avondale, Arizona	(United States) Al Unser	(United States) Bobby Unser
2	May 2^{A}	Trenton 200	Trenton International Speedway	Trenton, New Jersey	(United States) A. J. Foyt	(United States) Johnny Rutherford
3	May 30	International 500 Mile Sweepstakes^{B}	Indianapolis Motor Speedway	Speedway, Indiana	(United States) Johnny Rutherford	(United States) Johnny Rutherford
4	June 13	Rex Mays Classic	Wisconsin State Fair Park Speedway	West Allis, Wisconsin	(United States) Gordon Johncock	(United States) Mike Mosley
5	June 27	Schaefer 500	Pocono International Raceway	Long Pond, Pennsylvania	(United States) Johnny Parsons	(United States) Al Unser
6	July 18	Norton Twin 200s	Michigan International Speedway	Brooklyn, Michigan	(United States) A. J. Foyt	(United States) Gordon Johncock
7	August 1	Texas 150	Texas World Speedway	College Station, Texas	(United States) A. J. Foyt	(United States) A. J. Foyt
8	August 15	Trenton 200^{C}	Trenton International Speedway	Trenton, New Jersey	(United States) A. J. Foyt	(United States) Gordon Johncock
9	August 22	Tony Bettenhausen 200	Wisconsin State Fair Park Speedway	West Allis, Wisconsin	(United States) Johnny Rutherford	(United States) Al Unser
10	September 5	California 500	Ontario Motor Speedway	Ontario, California	(United States) A. J. Foyt	(United States) Bobby Unser
11	September 18	Michigan 150	Michigan International Speedway	Brooklyn, Michigan	(United States) A. J. Foyt	(United States) A. J. Foyt
12	October 31	Benihana World Series of Auto Racing	Texas World Speedway	College Station, Texas	(United States) A. J. Foyt	(United States) Johnny Rutherford
13	November 7	Bobby Ball 150	Phoenix International Raceway	Avondale, Arizona	(United States) Bobby Unser	(United States) Al Unser

^A Originally scheduled for April 25 but postponed to May 2 due to heavy rain.
^B Scheduled for 500 miles, stopped early due to rain.
^C Scheduled for 200 miles, stopped early due to rain.

== Final points standings ==
Note: David Hobbs, Danny Ongais and Vern Schuppan were not eligible for points.

Pos	Driver	PHX1	TRE1	INDY	MIL1	POC	MIS1	TWS1	TRE2	MIL2	ONT	MIS2	TWS2	PHX2	Pts
1	(United States) Gordon Johncock	3	2	3	**2**	27	1	5	1	2	3	2	2	2	4240
2	(United States) Johnny Rutherford	18	1	**1**	9	4	2	3	7	**3**	2	11	1	16	4220
3	(United States) Wally Dallenbach	16	6	4	12	3	20	2	4	17	4	3	6	4	3105
4	(United States) Al Unser	**4**		7	4	1	10	17	2	1	32	18	3	1	3020
5	(United States) Mike Mosley	5	5	15	1	2	22	4	5	5	15	7	22	Wth	2120
6	(United States) Bobby Unser	1	Wth	10	3	32				4	1	4	17	**21**	2080
7	(United States) A. J. Foyt	21	**18**	2	17	31	**3**	**1**	**19**		**23**	**1**	**11**		1720
8	(United States) Tom Sneva	17	3	6	13	7	6	16	3	13	26	5		Wth	1570
9	(United States) Mario Andretti			8		5							4	3	1200
10	(United States) Johnny Parsons	6	4	12	5	**22**	4	18	6	12	Wth	13	15	20	980
11	(United States) Roger McCluskey		Wth	30		6	5	Wth	22	6	21	10	19	5	955
12	(United States) Pancho Carter	2	7	5	18	14					29	Wth	10		920
13	(United States) Tom Bigelow	20	17	14	11	29	12	7	21	7	5	9	14	18	820
14	(United States) Bill Vukovich II	Wth	22	31	6	26	Wth	6	8	15	24		5	6	660
15	(United States) Jan Opperman			16		19	7		10		6				580
16	(United States) Rick Mears RY										8		9	9	390
17	(United States) Bill Puterbaugh			22		DNQ					7			8	375
18	(United States) Steve Krisiloff			24		8					16	6	21	17	370
19	(United States) George Snider			13		9						22	7	10	365
20	(United States) Salt Walther	9	9	9		18			DNQ		22				340
21	(United States) Dick Simon	7	16	32	14	10	19		13	16	30	21		7	330
22	(United States) John Martin	11	8	21	7	21	9		17	18	18				300
23	(United States) Todd Gibson R					17	Wth	13	9	8	11	14	16	13	280
24	(United States) Bobby Olivero R	13		DNQ	10	DNQ		11			9		DNQ	14	275
25	(United States) Larry Dickson	19	19	Wth		11	14	15	11			19	8	15	240
26	(United States) Al Loquasto	8	10	25		15		10	12		DNQ		Wth	12	215
27	(United States) Larry Cannon			17		30	11	8	Wth			8	18		190
28	(United States) Bill Simpson			DNQ	8	23	8	12	14		14	15	20	DNQ	190
29	(United States) Jerry Grant	22		27							10				150
30	(United States) Spike Gehlhausen	12	14	33	21	25	16	14	16	9	13	12	12	19	130
31	(United States) Lloyd Ruby			11									13	22	100
32	(United States) Lee Kunzman			Wth		13	18	9	DNQ		20		DNQ	11	90
33	(United States) Roger Rager R								20	10	17	16			60
34	(United States) Sheldon Kinser			19		28					12				50
35	(United States) Bob Harkey			20		12					DNQ	20			50
36	(United States) Jim McElreath	10		DNQ							DNQ				45
37	(United States) Ed Finley R	DNQ	13		15				DNQ	11		Wth			40
38	(United States) Tom Frantz	15	11		Wth	Wth							DNQ		40
39	(United States) Ken Nichols R	Wth	12		20	Wth			18	14				DNQ	20
-	(United States) Janet Guthrie R		15	DNQ		24	13		15		DNQ				0
-	(United States) Arlene Hiss R	14													0
-	(Canada) Frank Weiss R				16		15								0
-	(United States) Larry McCoy			26		16									0
-	(Canada) Eldon Rasmussen			DNQ		20	17				31	17			0
-	(Australia) Vern Schuppan R			18											0
-	(United States) Jerry Karl			Wth	19		21				DNQ				0
-	(United States) Mike Hiss			DNQ							19				0
-	(Canada) Ed Crombie R	DNQ	20	Wth							Wth			Wth	0
-	(United States) Jack Owen R		21		Wth										0
-	(United States) Billy Scott			23							Wth				0
-	(United States) John Mahler			DNQ							25				0
-	(United States) Gary Bettenhausen	Wth		28	Wth	33					27				0
-	(United States) Danny Ongais R										28				0
-	(United Kingdom) David Hobbs			29											0
-	(United States) Mel Kenyon			DNQ							33				0
-	(United States) Greg Hodges R	Wth			DNQ				DNQ						0
-	(United States) Billy Engelhart R			DNQ											0
-	(United States) Jim Hurtubise			DNQ											0
-	(United States) Rick Muther			DNQ											0
-	(United States) Gary Allbritain R	Wth	Wth												0
-	(United States) Benny Rapp R		Wth												0
-	(United States) Eddie Miller R			Wth											0
Pos	Driver	PHX1	TRE1	INDY	MIL1	POC	MIS1	TWS1	TRE2	MIL2	ONT	MIS2	TWS2	PHX2	Pts

Color	Result
Gold	Winner
Silver	2nd place
Bronze	3rd place
Green	4th & 5th place
Light Blue	6th-10th place
Dark Blue	Finished (Outside Top 10)
Purple	Did not finish (Ret)
Red	Did not qualify (DNQ)
Brown	Withdrawn (Wth)
Black	Disqualified (DSQ)
White	Did not start (DNS)
Blank	Did not participate (DNP)
Blank	Not competing

**In-line notation**
**Bold**	Pole position
Italics	Ran fastest race lap
*	Led most race laps
RY Rookie of the Year
R Rookie

== See also ==
- 1976 Indianapolis 500
