= 1977 Indianapolis 500 =

American motor race

61st Indianapolis 500
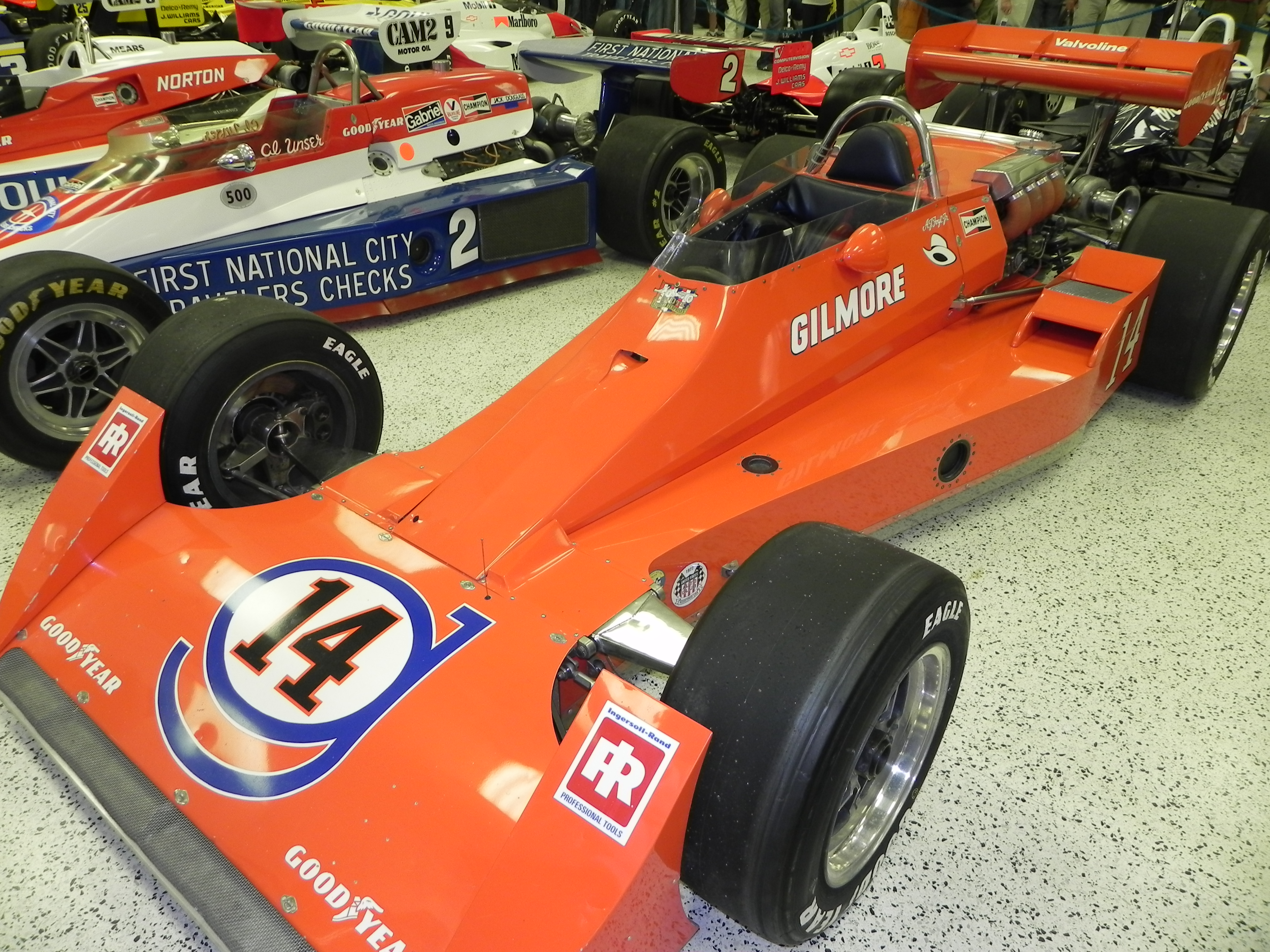

Indianapolis Motor Speedway

Indianapolis 500
- Sanctioning body: USAC
- Season: 1977 USAC Trail
- Date: May 29, 1977
- Winner: A. J. Foyt, Jr.
- Winning team: A. J. Foyt Enterprises
- Winning Chief Mechanic: Tony Foyt Sr. & Jack Starne
- Time of race: 3:05:57.70
- Average speed: 161.331 mph (259.637 km/h)
- Pole position: Tom Sneva
- Pole speed: 198.884 mph (320.073 km/h)
- Fastest qualifier: Tom Sneva
- Rookie of the Year: Jerry Sneva
- Most laps led: Gordon Johncock (129)

Pre-race ceremonies
- National anthem: Purdue band
- "Back Home Again in Indiana": Jim Nabors
- Starting command: Tony Hulman
- Pace car: Oldsmobile Delta 88
- Pace car driver: James Garner
- Starter: Pat Vidan
- Estimated attendance: 350,000

Television in the United States
- Network: ABC
- Announcers: Jim McKay and Jackie Stewart
- Nielsen ratings: 15.6 / 32

Chronology
| Previous | Next |
|---|---|
| 1976 | 1978 |

The 61st 500 Mile International Sweepstakes was held at the Indianapolis Motor Speedway in Speedway, Indiana, on Sunday, May 29, 1977. Considered one of the most historically significant editions of the Indianapolis 500, several sidebar stories complemented the unprecedented accomplishment of race winner A. J. Foyt. Foyt became the first driver to win the Indianapolis 500 four times. As of 2026, Foyt's four wins have been equaled by Al Unser Sr., Rick Mears and Hélio Castroneves, but still stands as an Indy 500 record. It was the second time Foyt won the "500" as an owner/driver, as he co-owned the entry with businessman Jim Gilmore. Foyt's Coyote chassis, built in-house, powered by the turbocharged Foyt V-8 engine (a derivative of the DOHC Ford Indy V-8) marks the most-recent time the winning car (chassis and engine) was built entirely within the United States.

Two major stories headlined qualifying. During time trials, Tom Sneva won the pole position with a new track record. He became the first driver to break the 200 mph barrier at the Speedway. On the final day of time trials, Janet Guthrie broke the gender barrier by becoming the first female driver to qualify for the Indy 500. Other historical milestones during the month included the inaugural Pit Stop Contest, the first grandson of a former driver entering (Teddy Pilette), and the first father and son combination attempting to qualify for the same race (Jim and James McElreath Jr.). However, neither Pilette (grandson of 1913 competitor Théodore Pilette) nor McElreath Jr. succeeded in making the field.

During the summer of 1976, the entire track was repaved in asphalt. It marked the first time since the original brick surface was laid in the fall of 1909 that the Indianapolis Motor Speedway was repaved in its entirety. The surface was allowed to cure over the winter, and during a tire test in March, Gordon Johncock ran a lap of 200.401 mph, an unofficial track record.

This would be the final Indy 500 for track owner Tony Hulman, who would die of heart failure on October 27, 1977. IMS Radio Network anchor Sid Collins did not call the race for the first time since 1951. Collins committed suicide on May 2, just five days before opening day, after being diagnosed with ALS. Collins was replaced by new "Voice of the 500" Paul Page. Then less than a year later, eight USAC officials would be killed in a plane crash.

The race was sanctioned by USAC, and was part of the 1977 USAC National Championship Trail. After rain-shortened races in three of the past four years (1973, 1975, 1976), the 1977 race was run the full distance under hot and sunny conditions.

== Race schedule ==
Race schedule — May, 1977
| Sun | Mon | Tue | Wed | Thu | Fri | Sat |
|---|---|---|---|---|---|---|
| 1 | 2 | 3 | 4 | 5 | 6 | 7 Opening Day |
| 8 Practice | 9 Practice | 10; Practice | 11; Practice | 12; Practice | 13; Practice | 14; Pole Day |
| 15; Time Trials | 16; Practice | 17; Practice | 18; Practice | 19; Practice | 20; Practice | 21; Time Trials |
| 22; Time Trials | 23 | 24 | 25 | 26; Carb Day | 27; Mini-Marathon | 28; Parade |
| 29; Indy 500 | 30; Memorial Day | 31 | | | | |

| Color | Notes |
|---|---|
| Green | Practice |
| Dark Blue | Time trials |
| Silver | Race day |
| Red | Rained out* |
| Blank | No track activity |

* Includes days where track
activity was significantly
limited due to rain

== Time trials ==
For 1977, the turbocharger "boost" settings were increased from 75 inHg (used in 1976) back to 80 inHg (used in 1974–1975). This, along with offseason engine development by the teams, was expected to provide about 50 additional horsepower. Furthermore, the repaving of the track during the offseason was expected to add at least 2–3 mph in speed.

During the first week of practice, several drivers flirted with the elusive 200 mph barrier. Mario Andretti, A. J. Foyt, and Johnny Rutherford all ran unofficial practice laps over 200 mph. All three became immediate favorites for the pole position. Going into the month, the official one-lap track record was still 199.071 mph, set by Johnny Rutherford back in 1973.

=== Pole Day – Saturday May 14 ===
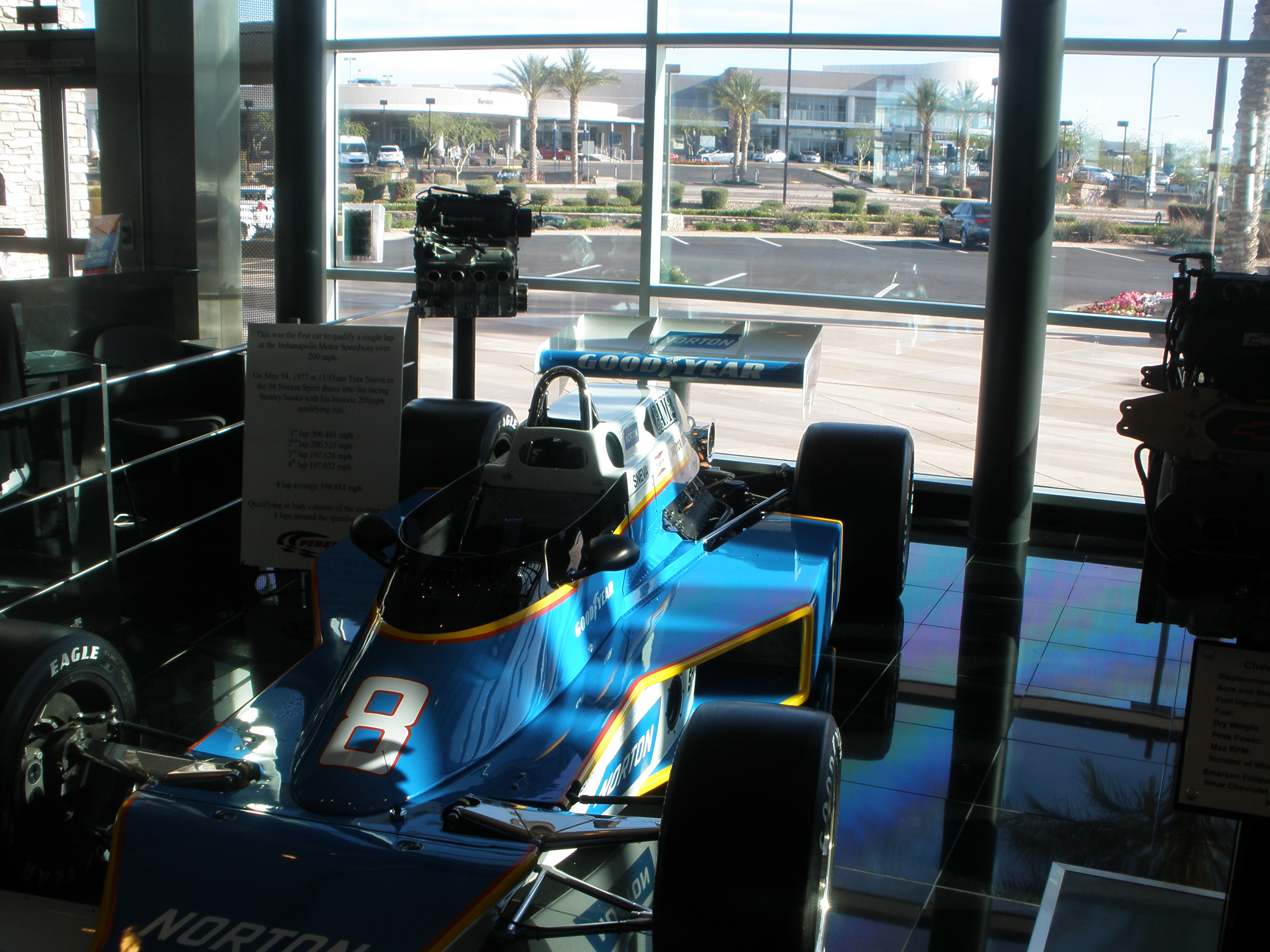
Tom Sneva's pole-winning car

Pole day was sunny and warm, and an estimated 200,000 spectators arrived anticipating a record-setting day. No drivers broke the 200 mph barrier during practice on the morning of pole day, but participants and observers expected the record to fall during official time trials. At 11:00 a.m., A. J. Foyt was the first driver to make an attempt. His four-lap speed of 193.465 mph was far short of the record. About a half hour later, Al Unser Sr. (195.950 mph) went faster and knocked Foyt off of the top spot.

At 11:51 a.m., Tom Sneva took to the track. He set new all-time one-lap and four-lap track records. He became the first driver to break the 200 mph barrier at Indianapolis.

- Lap 1 – 44.91 seconds, 200.401 mph (new 1-lap track record)
- Lap 2 – 44.88 seconds, 200.535 mph (new 1-lap track record)
- Lap 3 – 45.54 seconds, 197.628 mph
- Lap 4 – 45.68 seconds, 197.032 mph
- Total – 3:01.01, 198.884 mph (new 4-lap track record)

Though his last two laps dropped off, Sneva's four-lap average was fast enough to secure the pole position. Sneva was rewarded by having 200 silver dollars poured into his helmet. The symbolic gesture, performed by Phil Hedback of Bryant Heating and Cooling Company, mimicked Parnelli Jones, who broke the 150 mph barrier in 1962, and was awarded with 150 silver dollars poured into his helmet.

About an hour later, USAC officials retracted A. J. Foyt's qualifying time. During post-inspection, they discovered that his pop-off valve was fractured and malfunctioned. Since the infraction was not Foyt's fault, he was allowed to re-qualify. Foyt's speed of 194.563 mph was faster than his previous attempt, and he would line up 4th.

Bobby Unser (197.618 mph) put himself in the middle of the front row, bumping his brother Al to the outside. Johnny Rutherford, an early favorite for the front row, waved off his first run, then stalled on his second run. The day ended with the field filled to 16 cars, with Rutherford among those not qualified. Sneva was the only driver to run any laps over 200 mph all afternoon.

=== Second Day – Sunday May 15 ===
Johnny Rutherford (197.325 mph) put in the third-fastest speed in the field, but as a second day qualifier, he was forced to line up behind the first day qualifiers in 17th position.

Five cars completed runs, filling the field to 21 cars. Clay Regazzoni wrecked during his attempt, but was not seriously injured. Regazzoni was planning on running both Indy and the Monaco Grand Prix, but the crash complicated his travel schedule.

=== Third Day – Saturday May 21 ===
Clay Regazzoni started the day in Monte Carlo, but rain washed out his chance to qualify for the Monaco Grand Prix. Car owner Teddy Yip made plans to fly him back to Indy and attempt to qualify for the 500. Mario Andretti, who put in a safe qualifying time at Indy the weekend before, remained in Monaco to compete in the race, he would finish 5th.

Qualifying was sparse during the early parts of the day, with at least 12 cars taking to the track, but only two attempts run to completion. At the end of the day, the field was filled to 27 cars. Clay Regazzoni arrived to Indianapolis late in the day on Saturday. It was too late to make a qualifying attempt Saturday, but he was preparing to go out Sunday.

=== Bump Day – Sunday May 22 ===
The final day of time trials became a historic milestone in auto racing history. Janet Guthrie was the first car to take the track, and she became the first female driver to qualify for the Indianapolis 500. Her four-lap average of 188.403 mph put her safely in the field, and she was the fastest car of the afternoon. Like he did for Tom Sneva a week earlier, Phil Hedback poured 188 silver dollars in her helmet, matching her qualifying speed, which was also a female closed-course speed record.

After a hectic travel burden, Clay Regazzoni finally put a car in the field.

At about 3:30 p.m., Salt Walther (184.549 mph) completed a run, followed later by Bubby Jones (184.938 mph), and the field was filled to 33 cars with Walther on the bubble. Cliff Hucul (187.198 mph) bumped out Walther. With about an hour to go, Eldon Rasmussen bumped out Vern Schuppan, and John Mahler bumped out Joe Saldana.

The final hour of qualifying saw several drivers try, but fail, to bump their way in. Young rookie Rick Mears was too slow on his two attempts, and he failed to qualify. Jim Hurtubise once again was the center of attention for a few minutes, as he rolled out his Mallard/Offy to the qualifying line. After one slow lap he waved off.

As the 6 o'clock gun fired, James McElreath, Jr. was the final car on the track, but his speed was too slow to make the field. Jim and James, Jr. were trying to become the first father and son to qualify for the same Indy 500. James, Jr. fell short, however, and would die in a sprint car crash later in the year, never having a chance to race together.

== Carburetion Day ==
The final practice session was scheduled for Thursday May 26. After qualifying closed, the team of Salt Walther purchased the qualified car of Bill Puterbaugh from owner Lee Elkins. Salt's father George and brother Jeff were responsible for the purchase, and paid a reported $60,000 for the entry, and subsequently fired Puterbaugh from the ride. Salt Walther was named the new driver for the car, and it was repainted in his livery. According to the rules, the car would have to move to the rear of the field on race day. Almost immediately, the situation received significant negative criticism. A day later, Puterbaugh was reinstated to the ride, therefore Puterbaugh was reinstated to his 28th starting position.

The final practice day saw Johnny Rutherford (194.533 mph) set the fastest lap. Mike Mosley was the only incident of the day, suffering a broken piston.

=== Pit stop Contest ===
The elimination rounds for the first annual Miller Pit Stop Contest were held Thursday May 26. Qualifying heats were held May 16–17, and sixteen teams advanced to the elimination bracket. Teams would compete head-to-head, in a layout that resembled a drag race. Cars would drive into the pit box, then crews were required to change two tires (right sides). After they drop the jacks, the cars had to leave the pit box under power. Time penalties would be assessed for various violations. The top times registered during the qualifying heats belonged to Pancho Carter (14.83 seconds), A. J. Foyt (14.84 seconds), Gordon Johncock (16.28 seconds) and Wally Dallenbach (17.06 seconds).

The finals pitted Jim McElreath (Carillo) versus Wally Dallenbach (Patrick Racing). The Carillo team, led by crew chief Dave Kylm won with a time of 15.09 seconds.

Finals
73 | Jim McElreath (Carillo) | 15.09
40 | Wally Dallenbach (Patrick Racing) | 15.82

== Starting lineup ==
=== Grid ===
| Row | Inside | | Middle | | Outside | |
|---|---|---|---|---|---|---|
| 1 | 8 | (United States) Tom Sneva; Norton Spirit; Penske Racing; McLaren, Cosworth DFX; 198.884 mph (320.073 km/h) | 6 | (United States) Bobby Unser W Cobre Tire/Clayton; Fletcher Racing; Lightning, Offenhauser; 197.618 mph (318.035 km/h) | 21 | (United States) Al Unser W American Racing Wheels; Vel's Parnelli Jones Racing; Parnelli, Cosworth DFX; 195.950 mph (315.351 km/h) |
| 2 | 14 | (United States) A. J. Foyt W Gilmore Racing; A. J. Foyt Enterprises; Coyote, Foyt V-8; 194.563 mph (313.119 km/h) | 20 | (United States) Gordon Johncock W STP Double Oil Filter; Patrick Racing; Wildcat, DGS; 193.517 mph (311.435 km/h) | 9 | (United States) Mario Andretti W CAM2 Motor Oil; Penske Racing; McLaren, Cosworth DFX; 193.353 mph (311.171 km/h) |
| 3 | 25 | (United States) Danny Ongais R Interscope Racing; Interscope Racing; Parnelli, Cosworth DFX; 193.040 mph (310.668 km/h) | 48 | (United States) Pancho Carter; Jorgensen Steel; All American Racers; Eagle, Offenhauser; 192.452 mph (309.721 km/h) | 5 | (United States) Mike Mosley; Sugaripe Prune; Jerry O'Connell; Lightning, Offenhauser; 190.064 mph (305.878 km/h) |
| 4 | 40 | (United States) Wally Dallenbach Sr. STP Oil Treatment; Patrick Racing; Wildcat, DGS; 189.563 mph (305.072 km/h) | 60 | (United States) Johnny Parsons; STP/Goodyear; Patrick Racing; Wildcat, DGS; 189.255 mph (304.576 km/h) | 97 | (United States) Sheldon Kinser; Genesee Beer; Grant King; Dragon, Offenhauser; 189.076 mph (304.288 km/h) |
| 5 | 18 | (United States) George Snider; Mel Simon; Bobby Hillin; Wildcat, DGS; 188.976 mph (304.127 km/h) | 78 | (United States) Bobby Olivero R Alex Foods; Alex Morales; Lightning, Offenhauser; 188.452 mph (303.284 km/h) | 86 | (United States) Al Loquasto; Frostie Root Beer; Al Loquasto; McLaren, Offenhauser; 187.647 mph (301.989 km/h) |
| 6 | 36 | (United States) Jerry Sneva R 21st Amendment; Spirit of America Racers; McLaren, Offenhauser; 186.616 mph (300.329 km/h) | 2 | (United States) Johnny Rutherford W 1st National City Travelers Checks; McLaren Racing; McLaren, Cosworth DFX; 197.325 mph (317.564 km/h) | 11 | (United States) Roger McCluskey; 1st National City Travelers Checks; Lindsey Hopkins; Lightning, Offenhauser; 190.992 mph (307.372 km/h) |
| 7 | 10 | (United States) Lloyd Ruby; 1st National City Travelers Checks; Lindsey Hopkins; Lightning, Offenhauser; 190.840 mph (307.127 km/h) | 73 | (United States) Jim McElreath; Carillo; Carrillo Industries; Eagle, AMC; 187.715 mph (302.098 km/h) | 98 | (United States) Gary Bettenhausen; Agajanian-Knievel; Grant King; King, Offenhauser; 186.596 mph (300.297 km/h) |
| 8 | 24 | (United States) Tom Bigelow; Thermo King; Ralph Wilke; Eagle, Offenhauser; 186.471 mph (300.096 km/h) | 84 | (United States) Bill Vukovich II; Gilmore Racing; A. J. Foyt Enterprises; Coyote, Foyt V-8; 186.393 mph (299.970 km/h) | 65 | (United States) Lee Kunzman; City of Syracuse; Patrick Santello; Eagle, Offenhauser; 186.384 mph (299.956 km/h) |
| 9 | 92 | (United States) Steve Krisiloff; Dave McIntire Chevy; Tassi Vatis; Eagle, Offenhauser; 184.691 mph (297.231 km/h) | 27 | (United States) Janet Guthrie R Bryant Air Conditioning; Rolla Vollstedt; Lightning, Offenhauser; 188.403 mph (303.205 km/h) | 29 | (Canada) Cliff Hucul R Team Canada; Hucul/Hunter/Arndt; McLaren, Offenhauser; 187.198 mph (301.266 km/h) |
| 10 | 16 | (United States) Bill Puterbaugh; Dayton-Walther; George Walther; Eagle, Offenhauser; 186.800 mph (300.625 km/h) | 38 | (Switzerland) Clay Regazzoni R Theodore Racing; Teddy Yip; McLaren, Offenhauser; 186.047 mph (299.414 km/h) | 17 | (United States) Dick Simon; Bryant Air Conditioning; Rolla Vollstedt; Vollstedt, Offenhauser; 185.615 mph (298.718 km/h) |
| 11 | 42 | (United States) John Mahler; 20th Century; Don Mergard; Eagle, Offenhauser; 185.242 mph (298.118 km/h) | 58 | (Canada) Eldon Rasmussen; Rent-A-Racer; Eldon Rasmussen; Rascar, Foyt V-8; 185.119 mph (297.920 km/h) | 72 | (United States) Bubby Jones R Bruce Cogle Ford; Bobby Hillin; Eagle, Offenhauser; 184.938 mph (297.629 km/h) |

=== Alternates ===
- First alternate: Joe Saldana R (#64)

=== Failed to qualify ===
- Larry Cannon (#67) – Drove relief during the race
- James McElreath R (#26) – Too slow
- Joe Saldana (#64) – Bumped
- Salt Walther (#33, #77) – Bumped, Wave off
- Vern Schuppan (#15, #85) – Bumped, Wave off
- Jerry Karl (#37, #57, #88) – Wave off
- Jim Hurtubise (#56) – Wave off
- Rick Mears R (#90) – Wave off
- John Martin (#28) – Wave off
- Todd Gibson R (#22, #96) – Wave off
- Mel Kenyon (#88) – Wave off
- Jerry Grant (#69, #75) – Crashed during qualifying
- Spike Gehlhausen (#19) – Crashed during qualifying
- Larry Dickson (#80) – Crashed during qualifying
- Larry McCoy (#63) – Incomplete qualifying attempt
- Ed Crombie R (#67)
- Ed Finley R (#70)
- Tom Frantz R (#88)
- Bob Harkey (#88)
- Gary Irvin R (#23)
- Graham McRae (#33)
- Teddy Pilette R (#91)
- Bill Simpson (#38)

R = Indianapolis 500 rookie
W = Former Indianapolis 500 winner

== Race summary ==
=== Pre-race ===
After Janet Guthrie became the first female driver to qualify for the Indianapolis 500, controversy began to surround the famous starting command, "Gentlemen, start your engines!" Speedway management did not want to alter the traditional phrase. During the week before the race, the management announced that they would not change the wording of the command, but numerous suggestions were being offered by various promoters and members of the media around the country. Looking for an excuse, the management insisted that the cars were actually started by male crew members with an electric hand-held starter from behind the car. Guthrie and her crew were quite displeased by the stubbornness of the Speedway management, considering her unprecedented accomplishment. The crew reacted by assigning Kay Bignotti (wife of George Bignotti) as the crew member to operate the inertial starter at the back of Guthrie's car. The Speedway's argument fell apart, and they decided upon a special amended command for that year. They did not announce beforehand what the special command would be, and Hulman's highly anticipated phrase was the following:

"In company with the first lady ever to qualify at Indianapolis, gentlemen, start your engines!"

The issues with the starting command were not Guthrie's only troubles. On the morning of the race, an official inspecting the pit area discovered that Guthrie's pit side fuel tank hose was leaking. Dripping methanol fuel was observed under the tank, and officials threatened to disqualify the team if they could not contain the leak. A hasty repair was made by wrapping a plastic bag around the hose, and the officials were satisfied.

=== First half ===
At the start, Al Unser swept from the outside of the front row, and led into turn one. Polesitter Tom Sneva grabbed second. Bobby Unser settled into third. Johnny Rutherford over-revved the engine, and dropped out with gearbox failure. Janet Guthrie was in the pits early with engine trouble. She would suffer a long day of numerous frustrating pits stops.

Gordon Johncock took the lead for the first time on lap 18. After Johncock pitted, A. J. Foyt led laps 27–51.

Lloyd Ruby crashed in turn two and brought out the yellow on lap 49. It would be Ruby's final Indy 500. During the sequence of pit stops, Gordon Johncock came to the lead, and led most of the laps to the midpoint.

Eldon Rasmussen brought out the yellow for a spin on lap 69. He was able to continue. It was only the second, and would be the last, on-track incident of the race. At the halfway point, attrition had taken its toll during the hot day. Only 17 cars were still running.

=== Second half ===
Gordon Johncock was the dominating leader in the second half. He took the lead again on lap 97, and led through lap 179. A. J. Foyt, Tom Sneva, and Al Unser were the closest pursuers.

A long stretch of green flag racing continued until lap 159, when George Snider and Pancho Carter stalled on the track.

After numerous attempts to re-join the race, Janet Guthrie finally dropped out on the leader's lap 149, having completed only 27 laps. On one of the many pit stops, fuel from the overflow hose leaked out and spilled into the cockpit. Guthrie's crew had to escort her back to the garage area and find a place for her to shower off in private (there were no women's restrooms in the garage area at the time) to clean off the spilled fuel prior to addressing the media.

Two cycles of pit stops remained for the leaders. Gordon Johncock continued to lead A. J. Foyt. Tom Sneva was also still on the lead lap. The three leaders made the next-to-last pits stops within one lap of each other. Johncock was beginning to complain of dehydration and heat exhaustion, and the crew doused him with water. Johncock, however, managed to return to the track with a lead of about 15–20 seconds.

=== Finish ===
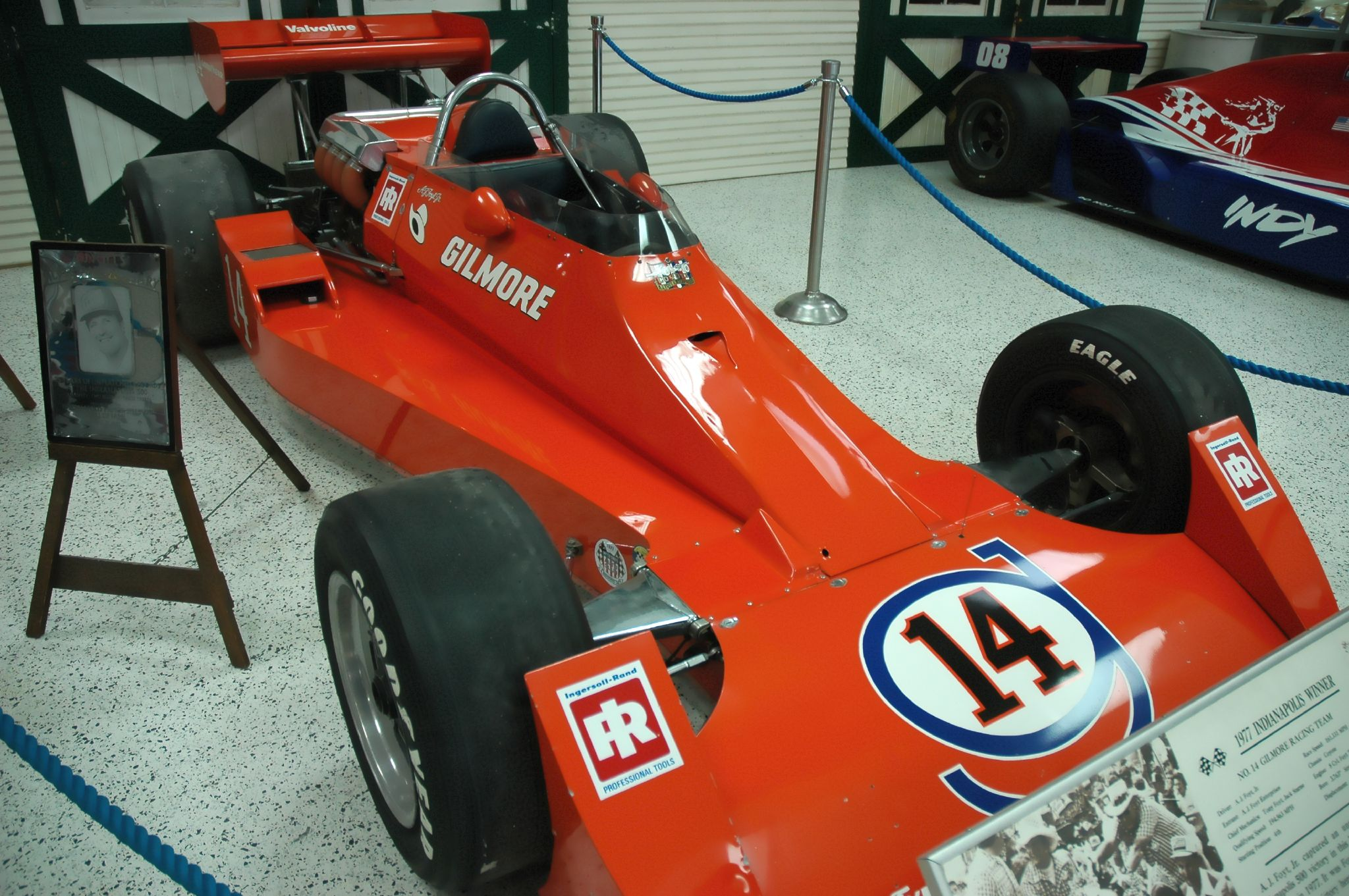
A. J. Foyt's 1977 winning car

With 20 laps to go, Gordon Johncock led A. J. Foyt by 10 seconds. Tom Sneva was lurking in third place. With Johncock physically ailing, Foyt began to narrow the margin. Johncock made his final pit stop on lap 181. He took on fuel only, and the crew again doused him with water. He pulled away after a 14.7-second stop. Two laps later, Foyt made his final stop on lap 183. Foyt took on right side tires and fuel, and was away in only 12.9 seconds. Johncock re-emerged as the leader, but his lead was down to only 7 seconds.

As Johncock hit the mainstretch the next time around to complete lap 184, a huge cloud of smoke suddenly billowed from his car. He veered to the inside and parked the car in turn one with a broken crankshaft. Foyt inherited the lead with only 16 laps to go. Johncock climbed from his car, and hopped into the infield creek to splash some water on himself to cool off. Foyt now held a nearly 30-second lead over second place Tom Sneva. Foyt was able to cruise comfortably over the final 15 laps and became the first driver to win the Indianapolis 500 four times.

On Foyt's cool down lap, many fans began to storm the track in celebration, similar to what had happened in 1974. Chief steward Tom Binford had announced before the race that the customary five minutes of "extra time" was going to be allowed for the other drivers to finish the race, a rule that dated back to 1964 (before 1964, the extra time allowed was even longer). However, he immediately red flagged the race, and all of the other cars were instead "Flagged" off the track. Third place Al Unser ran out of fuel on the backstretch, about a half lap from the finish line, and within seconds his car was surrounded by a group of fans. It was estimated that fourth place Wally Dallenbach would have been able to pass Unser and finish third if not for the incursion. This prompted the officials to change the rules in subsequent years to eliminate the "extra time." Once the winner crossed the finish line, the race ends, and all others on the track would be allowed only to finish the current lap they were running.

=== Post race ===
The historic accomplishment was highly celebrated, and Foyt invited track owner Tony Hulman to ride with him in the pace car to salute the fans. It was one of the few times that Hulman rode with the winner of the race, and his last, as he died the following October.

Tom Sneva bettered his 6th-place finish from the previous year to a solid 2nd place. It was his first of three runner-up finishes prior to his 1983 victory. He would ride this momentum by winning the Pocono 500 later in the season, and won the 1977 USAC National Championship. His brother Jerry Sneva came home 10th, and won rookie of the year honors. With only a handful of laps remaining, Larry "Boom Boom" Cannon climbed into the car of John Mahler, who was exhausted from the heat. Cannon was the first relief driver since 1973, and would stand as the last relief driver until 2004. Cannon managed to complete only 8 laps before the checkered flag flew, but he prided himself as being one of only a handful of drivers on the track at the moment A. J. Foyt won his record fourth Indy 500.

== Box score ==
| Finish | Start | No | Name | Chassis | Engine | Laps | Status | Points |
|---|---|---|---|---|---|---|---|---|
| 1 | 4 | 14 | (United States) A. J. Foyt W | Coyote | Foyt V-8 | 200 | 161.331 mph | 1000 |
| 2 | 1 | 8 | (United States) Tom Sneva | McLaren M24 | Cosworth DFX | 200 | +28.63 seconds | 800 |
| 3 | 3 | 21 | (United States) Al Unser W | Parnelli | Cosworth DFX | 199 | Flagged | 700 |
| 4 | 10 | 40 | (United States) Wally Dallenbach Sr. | Wildcat | DGS | 199 | Flagged | 600 |
| 5 | 11 | 60 | (United States) Johnny Parsons | Wildcat | DGS | 193 | Flagged | 500 |
| 6 | 22 | 24 | (United States) Tom Bigelow | Eagle | Offenhauser | 192 | Flagged | 400 |
| 7 | 24 | 65 | (United States) Lee Kunzman | Eagle | Offenhauser | 191 | Flagged | 300 |
| 8 | 18 | 11 | (United States) Roger McCluskey | Lightning | Offenhauser | 191 | Flagged | 250 |
| 9 | 25 | 92 | (United States) Steve Krisiloff | Eagle | Offenhauser | 191 | Flagged | 200 |
| 10 | 16 | 36 | (United States) Jerry Sneva R | McLaren | Offenhauser | 187 | Flagged | 150 |
| 11 | 5 | 20 | (United States) Gordon Johncock W | Wildcat | DGS | 184 | Crankshaft | 100 |
| 12 | 28 | 16 | (United States) Bill Puterbaugh | Eagle | Offenhauser | 170 | Valve | 50 |
| 13 | 32 | 58 | (Canada) Eldon Rasmussen | Rascar | Foyt V-8 | 168 | Flagged | 0 |
| 14 | 31 | 42 | (United States) John Mahler (Larry Cannon Laps 150–157) | Eagle | Offenhauser | 157 | Flagged | 0 |
| 15 | 8 | 48 | (United States) Pancho Carter | Eagle | Offenhauser | 156 | Engine | 0 |
| 16 | 21 | 98 | (United States) Gary Bettenhausen | King | Offenhauser | 138 | Clutch | 0 |
| 17 | 23 | 84 | (United States) Bill Vukovich II | Coyote | Foyt V-8 | 110 | Wing Strut | 0 |
| 18 | 2 | 6 | (United States) Bobby Unser W | Lightning | Offenhauser | 94 | Oil Leak | 0 |
| 19 | 9 | 5 | (United States) Mike Mosley | Lightning | Offenhauser | 91 | Timing Gear | 0 |
| 20 | 7 | 25 | (United States) Danny Ongais R | Parnelli | Cosworth DFX | 90 | Header | 0 |
| 21 | 33 | 72 | (United States) Bubby Jones R | Eagle | Offenhauser | 78 | Valve | 0 |
| 22 | 27 | 29 | (Canada) Cliff Hucul R | McLaren | Offenhauser | 72 | Gearbox | 0 |
| 23 | 20 | 73 | (United States) Jim McElreath | Eagle | AMC | 71 | Turbocharger | 0 |
| 24 | 13 | 18 | (United States) George Snider | Wildcat | DGS | 65 | Valve | 0 |
| 25 | 14 | 78 | (United States) Bobby Olivero R | Lightning | Offenhauser | 57 | Piston | 0 |
| 26 | 6 | 9 | (United States) Mario Andretti W | McLaren M24 | Cosworth DFX | 47 | Header | 0 |
| 27 | 19 | 10 | (United States) Lloyd Ruby | Lightning | Offenhauser | 34 | Crash T2 | 0 |
| 28 | 15 | 86 | (United States) Al Loquasto | McLaren | Offenhauser | 28 | Magneto | 0 |
| 29 | 26 | 27 | (United States) Janet Guthrie R | Lightning | Offenhauser | 27 | Timing Gear | 0 |
| 30 | 29 | 38 | (Switzerland) Clay Regazzoni R | McLaren | Offenhauser | 25 | Fuel Cell | 0 |
| 31 | 30 | 17 | (United States) Dick Simon | Vollstedt | Offenhauser | 24 | Overheating | 0 |
| 32 | 12 | 97 | (United States) Sheldon Kinser | Dragon | Offenhauser | 14 | Piston | 0 |
| 33 | 17 | 2 | (United States) Johnny Rutherford W | McLaren M24 | Cosworth DFX | 12 | Gearbox | 0 |

Note: Relief drivers in parentheses

W Former Indianapolis 500 winner

R Indianapolis 500 Rookie

All cars utilized Goodyear tires.

=== Race statistics ===
Lap Leaders
| Laps | Leader |
|---|---|
| 1–17 | Al Unser |
| 18–21 | Gordon Johncock |
| 22–23 | A. J. Foyt |
| 24–25 | George Snider |
| 26 | Bill Vukovich II |
| 27–51 | A. J. Foyt |
| 52–68 | Gordon Johncock |
| 69–70 | Bobby Unser |
| 71–93 | Gordon Johncock |
| 94–96 | Tom Sneva |
| 97–179 | Gordon Johncock |
| 180–182 | A. J. Foyt |
| 183–184 | Gordon Johncock |
| 185–200 | A. J. Foyt |

Total laps led
| Driver | Laps |
|---|---|
| Gordon Johncock | 129 |
| A. J. Foyt | 46 |
| Al Unser | 17 |
| Tom Sneva | 3 |
| Bobby Unser | 2 |
| George Snider | 2 |
| Bill Vukovich II | 1 |

PACER Yellow Light Periods
5 for 22 laps
| Laps | Reason |
|---|---|
| 36–44 | Lloyd Ruby crash in turn 2 |
| 49–51 | Eldon Rasmussen tow-in |
| 69–72 | George Snider tow-in |
| 159–160 | Johnny Parsons tow-in |
| 163–166 | Pancho Carter blown engine |

=== Points standings after the race ===
| Rank | Driver | Points | Difference | Position Change |
|---|---|---|---|---|
| 1 | A. J. Foyt | 1640 | Leader | +2 |
| 2 | Al Unser | 1400 | -240 | 0 |
| 3 | Wally Dallenbach | 1325 | -315 | -2 |
| 4 | Tom Sneva | 1260 | -380 | +3 |
| 5 | Tom Bigelow | 840 | -800 | +3 |
| 6 | Gordon Johncock | 715 | -925 | -1 |
| 7 | Roger McCluskey | 660 | -980 | +2 |
| 8 | Johnny Rutherford | 640 | -1000 | -5 |
| 9 | Mike Mosley | 600 | -1040 | -3 |
| 10 | Johnny Parsons | 500 | -1140 | Unranked |

== Broadcasting ==
=== Radio ===
The race was carried live on the IMS Radio Network. Following the unexpected death of chief announcer Sid Collins on May 2, Paul Page was elevated to the anchor position and became the new "Voice of the 500." Lou Palmer reported from victory lane. Fred Agabashian returned for his 12th and final year as the "driver expert." At the opening of the broadcast, veteran Jim Shelton reported on the death of Collins to the worldwide listening audience, then introduced Page as the new anchor.

Paul Page had been groomed by Sid Collins to be his eventual replacement. Despite the bereavement of the crew regarding Collins’ death, the broadcast was a flawless affair, and ushered in a new era for the network. In the coming years, Page would upgrade the workings of the broadcast, including enhanced communication with the reporters, and new talent at the positions.

This would be the 30th year for Jim Shelton on the crew, reporting from his familiar fourth turn position. Darl Wible debuted on the crew in 1977, reporting from the backstretch location. Bob Forbes served as the wireless roving reporter in the garages. Among the celebrities interviewed in the pits were Evel Knievel (who was a sponsor on Gary Bettenhausens entry), 1957 500 winner Sam Hanks, and Formula One commentator Anthony Marsh.

Indianapolis Motor Speedway Radio Network
| Booth Announcers | Turn Reporters | Pit/garage reporters |
|---|---|---|
| Chief Announcer: Paul Page; Driver expert: Fred Agabashian; Statistician: John DeCamp; Historian: Donald Davidson | Turn 1: Ron Carrell; Turn 2: Howdy Bell; Backstretch: Darl Wible R Turn 3: Doug Zink; Turn 4: Jim Shelton | Jerry Baker (north pits); Chuck Marlowe (north-center pits); Luke Walton (south-center pits); Lou Palmer (south pits); Bob Forbes (garages) |

=== Television ===
The race was carried in the United States on ABC Sports on a same-day tape delay basis. "Heavy Action" was used in an "Indianapolis 500" opening credits for the second time as Monday Night Football Producers Roone Arledge and Chuck Howard along with Directors Chet Forte and Larry Kamm also did work on this broadcast. Jim McKay anchored the broadcast. The broadcast took place in the midst of the National Association of Broadcast Employees and Technicians strike at ABC. Unlike previous years during this era, ABC-TV got the first interview with the race winner, as Bill Flemming spoke with A. J. Foyt prior to Lou Palmer.

The broadcast has re-aired in partiality on ESPN Classic since May 2011.

The broadcast is also available for free via the official IndyCar Series and official Indianapolis Motor Speedway YouTube channels.

ABC Television
| Booth Announcers | Pit/garage reporters |
|---|---|
| Host: Chris Schenkel; Announcer: Jim McKay; Color: Jackie Stewart | Chris Economaki; Bill Flemming |

== Gallery ==
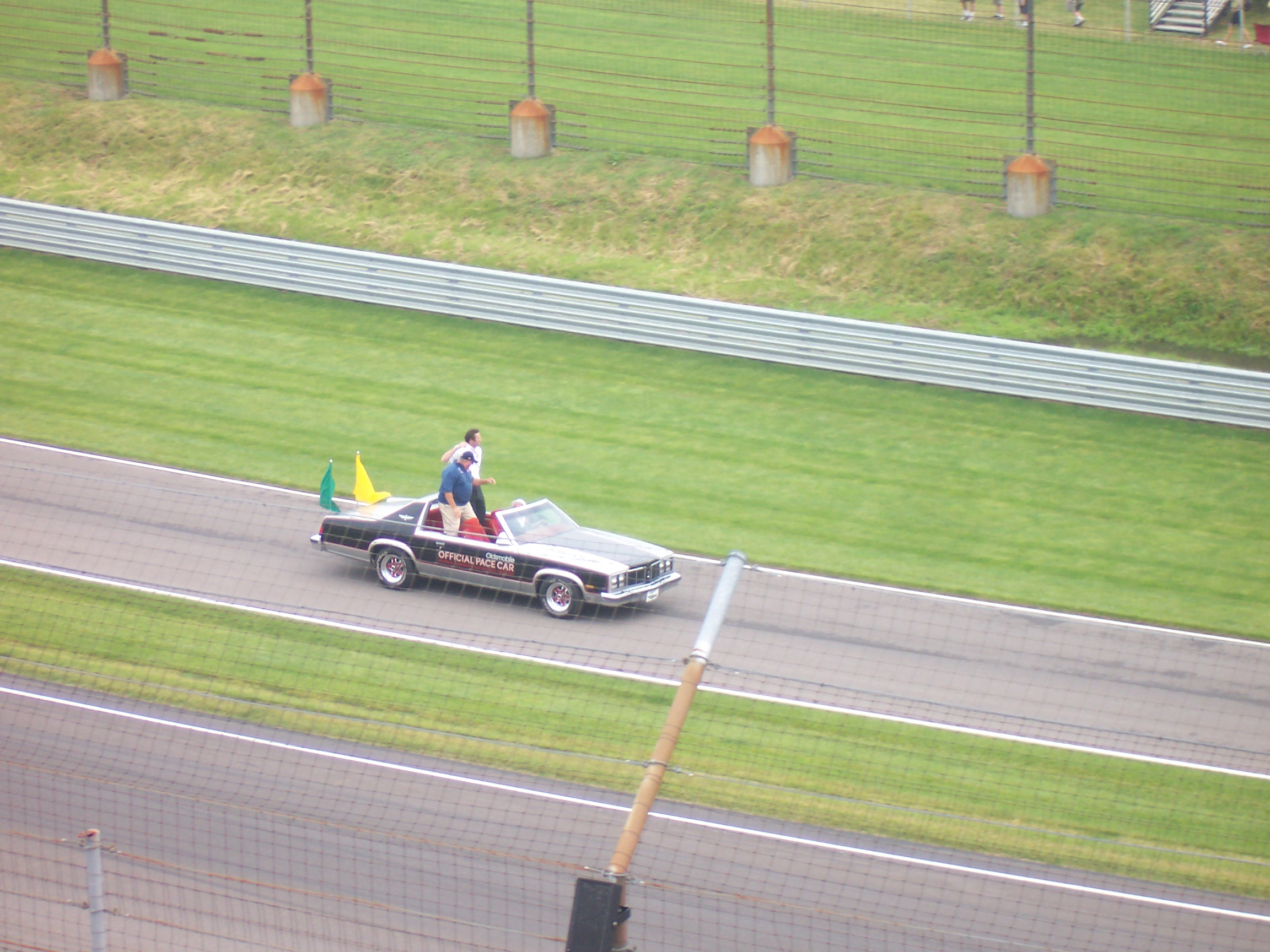
1977 Oldsmobile pace car

== Notes ==
=== See also ===
- 1977 USAC Championship Car season

=== Works cited ===
- 1977 Indianapolis 500 Press Information - Official Track Report
- Indianapolis 500 History: Race & All-Time Stats - Official Site
- 1977 Indianapolis 500 at RacingReference.info
- 1977 Indianapolis 500 Radio Broadcast, Indianapolis Motor Speedway Radio Network

| 1976 Indianapolis 500; Johnny Rutherford | 1977 Indianapolis 500; A. J. Foyt | 1978 Indianapolis 500; Al Unser |
