= Hiss =

Hiss or Hissing may refer to:

== Arts and entertainment ==
=== Music ===
- The Hiss, a five-piece rock band from Atlanta, Georgia
- Hiss (beatboxer), a South Korean beatboxer and producer
- "Hiss" (song), a 2024 song by Megan Thee Stallion

=== Other arts and entertainment ===
- H.I.S.S., High Speed Sentry, a fictional vehicle in the G.I. Joe universe
- "Hiss", a poem by Australian poet John Kinsella
- Hissing (manhwa), a Korean manhwa series by Kang EunYoung
- King Hiss, the villainous king of the Snake Men in Mattel toy line Masters of the Universe
- Sir Hiss, Prince John's fictional sidekick in the 1973 animated Disney movie Robin Hood

== Science and technology ==
- Hiss (electromagnetic), a wave generated in the plasma of the Earth's ionosphere or magnetosphere
- Noise (electronics) or electronic circuit hiss, white noise present at low level in all electronic circuits
- Tape hiss, high-frequency noise on analogue magnetic tape recordings

== Other uses ==
- Hiss, a sound made by snakes, cats, geese, and various other animals as a warning; see list of animal sounds
- Hiss (surname), includes a list of people with the surname
- Sibilant, in phonetics, a group of consonants that have a hissing or hushing sound

== See also ==
- Animal communication, including hissing to deter predators
- His (disambiguation)
- The Hissing of Summer Lawns, a 1975 album by Joni Mitchell
