= His =

His or HIS may refer to:

== People ==
- Wilhelm His Sr. (1831–1904), Swiss anatomist
- Wilhelm His Jr. (1863–1934), Swiss anatomist

== Places ==
- His, Agder, a village in Arendal municipality in Agder county, Norway
- His, Haute-Garonne, a commune in the Haute-Garonne department, France

== Schools ==
- Hangzhou International School, in China
- Harare International School, in Zimbabwe
- Hokkaido International School, in Japan
- Hsinchu International School, in Taiwan
- Hollandsch-Inlandsche School, a Dutch school for native Indonesians in the Dutch East Indies

== Science and technology ==
=== Biology and medicine ===
- Angle of His, also known as the esophagogastric angle, at the juncture of the stomach and esophagus
- Bundle of His, a collection of specialized heart cells
- Health information system
- Hospital information system
- Human identical sequence
- His-Tag, a polyhistidine motif in proteins
- Histidine, an amino acid abbreviated as His or H
- His 1 virus, a synonym of Halspiviridae
- HIS-1, a long non-coding RNA, also known as VIS1

=== Computing ===
- Health information system
- Hightech Information System, a Hong Kong graphics card company
- Honeywell Information Systems
- Hospital information system
- Hybrid intelligent system
- Microsoft Host Integration Server

=== Engineering ===
- High impedance surface

== Other uses ==
- His, the possessive form of the English-language pronoun he
- H.I.S. (travel agency), a Japanese travel agency

== See also ==
- Hiss (disambiguation)
