= Human identical sequence =

The human identical sequence (HIS) is a sequence of RNA elements, 24-27 nucleotides in length, that coronavirus genomes share with the human genome. In pathogenic progression, HIS acts as a NamiRNA (nuclear activating miRNA) through the NamiRNA-enhancer network to activate neighboring host genes. The first HIS elements was identified in the SARS-CoV-2 genome, which has five HIS elements; other human coronaviruses have one to five. It has been suggested that these sequences can be more generally termed "host identical sequences" since similar correlations have been found between the genome of SARS-CoV-2 and multiple potential hosts (bats, pangolins, ferrets, and cats).

== SARS-CoV-2 ==
name	length	sequence	location in virus genome	location in human genome	neighboring genes	note
HIS-SARS2-1	26	UGUCUAUGCUAAUGGAGGUAAAGGCU	7570–7595 in ORF1a	Chr3: 124017420-124017395	KALRN	
HIS-SARS2-2	24	UAUAACACAUATAAAAAUACGUGU	12494–12517 in ORF1a	Chr3: 176597319-176597342		
HIS-SARS2-3	24	UUAUAUGCCUUAUUUCUUUACUUU	6766–6789 in ORF1a	Chr5: 28949255-28949232		
HIS-SARS2-4	27	AGGAGAAUGACAAAAAAAAAAAAAAAA	29860–29886 in 3' UTR	Chr18: 73670168-73670142	FBXO15, TIMM21, CYB5A	same as HIS-SARS1-2
HIS-SARS2-5	24	UUGUUGCUGCUAUUUUCUAUUUAA	8610–8633 in ORF1a	ChrX: 99693480-99693457		

== SARS-CoV-1 ==
name	length	sequence	location in virus genome	location in human genome	neighboring genes	note
HIS-SARS-1	25	UAACAUGCUUAGGAUAAUGGCCUCU	15251–15275 in ORF1b	Chr4: 172887105–172887129; Chr8: 122356667-122356690	HAS2, ZHX2	
HIS-SARS-2	27	AGGAGAAUGACAAAAAAAAAAAAAAAA	29717–29743 in 3' UTR	Chr18: 73670168-73670142		same as HIS-SARS2-4

== MERS-CoV ==
name	length	sequence	location in virus genome	location in human genome	neighboring genes	note
HIS-MERS-1	24	UUCCAUUUGCACAGAGUAUCUUUU	24364–24387 in S	ChrX: 25635779-25635802		

== HCoV-HKU1 ==
name	length	sequence	location in virus genome	location in human genome	neighboring genes	note
HIS-HKU1-1	24	UUAGAAUUGUUCAAAUGUUAUCUG	18656-18679	chr1:106816197-106816220		
HIS-HKU1-2	24	UUUUCUAAGAAAGAUUGGUAUGAU	14044-14067	chr1:226438633-226438656 chr4:151100495-151100518 chr5:79284823-79284846 chr5:111192947-111192970 chr7:94695722-94695745 chr7:98386489-98386512 chr15:59768424-59768447 chr22:30137367-30137390		
HIS-HKU1-3	24	AUUUGACUUUAAAUCUUCAUACUA	26693-26716	chr4:11718458-11718481		
HIS-HKU1-4	24	GAUUGGUUGUAUUUUCAUUUUUAU	23527-23550	chr4:33759646-33759669		
HIS-HKU1-5	24	UAGAUACUGUUAUUUUUAAAAAUA	19844-19867	chrX:81711130-81711153		

== HCoV-NL63 ==
name	length	sequence	location in virus genome	location in human genome	neighboring genes	note
HIS-NL63-1	24	UUAUGAUUUUGGUGAUUUUGUUGU	13044-13067	chr1:215311768-215311791		
HIS-NL63-2	24	GGUGUUUUUGUUGAUGAUGUUGUU	14920-14943	chr4:28254452-28254475		
HIS-NL63-3	24	AUAGGCUUAAAUGCUUCUGUUACU	20754-20777	chr6:30469931-30469954		
HIS-NL63-4	24	AAGUAAUUGUAUUAAGAUGUUAUC	12124-12147	chr7:19853545-19853568		
HIS-NL63-5	24	AACUUUUAUGAUUUUGGUGAUUUU	13039-13062	chr9:1525276-1525299		

== HCoV-OC43 ==
name	length	sequence	location in virus genome	location in human genome	neighboring genes	note
HIS-OC43-1	24	UACAGCUCUUUGUAAAUCUGGUAG	22827-22850	chr8:122471006-122471029	HAS2, ZHX2	
HIS-OC43-2	24	UUGUAUGAGUGAUUUUAUGAGUGA	24509-24532	chr13:30510223-30510246		

== HCoV-229E ==
name	length	sequence	location in virus genome	location in human genome	neighboring genes	note
HIS-229E-1	24	AAUAUUUUAACAGUACCACGUUAU	19817-19840	chr8:42865576-42865599		
HIS-229E-2	24	ACUUUGUAUUGUGUCCUCCUGGAA	13139-13162	chr11:112451251-112451274		
