= Arlene Hiss =

American racing driver (born 1941)

- Born: 1941 (age 84–85); Derby, Connecticut, United States
- Awards: 1974 Most Outstanding Woman Driver

Champ Car career
- 1 race run over 1 year
- Years active: 1976
- Team: Copper State Racing
- Best finish: 40th (1976)
- First race: 1976 Jimmy Bryan 150 (Phoenix)
Wins	Podiums	Poles
0	0	0

Arlene Hiss (born 1954 according to Mortorsport Database or born 1941 (Note: Some period sources give Hiss' age at the time as being 28, giving a birth date of 1948, however other period sources give an age of 35, which is agreed with by more recent retrospectives.)) is an American former race car driver and schoolteacher. Hiss has the distinction of being the first woman to start an Indy car race, doing so in the 1976 season. She is the ex-wife of 1972 Indianapolis 500 Rookie of the Year Mike Hiss.

== Personal life ==
Hiss worked as a dance teacher at Fullerton High School in Fullerton, California, and was married to Mike Hiss, 1972 Indianapolis 500 Rookie of the Year, although by the time of her USAC career they were no longer married.

== Racing career ==
Hiss started her racing career in 1964, competing in Sports Car Club of America-sanctioned Showroom Stock racing, winning two California club championships. In 1974, she was named "Most Outstanding Woman Driver" by the Sports Car Racing Enterprises for Women.

In 1976, having received a USAC competition licence for the first two races of the 1976 USAC Championship Car season, she became the first woman to start an USAC Championship Car – "Indy car" – race when she entered the Jimmy Bryan 150 at Phoenix International Raceway. Hiss drove the No. 51 Copper State Racing Eagle 74-Offenhauser that had formerly been driven by Lloyd Ruby. Hiss qualified 21st out of 22 cars with a speed of 128.940 mph (207.509 km/h), while pole sitter Al Unser had a speed of 140.845 mph (226.668 km/h). In the race, Hiss was black flagged for going too slow. She said of this issue "I went up high on the track to let faster cars past. I guess the officials were concerned I was tired, so they brought me in to check. I told them I wasn't and went back out." Hiss ultimately finished in 14th place, albeit with only 128 of 150 laps complete.

Hiss also announced that she would enter the Indianapolis 500 and she tested at Ontario Motor Speedway, a track nearly identical to Indianapolis Motor Speedway. Her best lap speed was around 176 mph (283 km/h). Ultimately, Hiss was not entered at Indianapolis and Lloyd Ruby drove the car. Instead Hiss moved to the United States Auto Club Stock Car series, running five races over the course of the remainder of the year. Her best finish was a ninth in her first race at Texas World Speedway, driving the No. 9 Steve Drake Dodge Charger, although she finished 20 laps down to winner A. J. Foyt.

Later that year, Hiss entered the 1976 season finale for the NASCAR Winston Cup Series, the Los Angeles Times 500 at Ontario Motor Speedway in the No. 38 Let's Dine Out Chevrolet Monte Carlo owned by Tom Williams (whom Hiss had previously driven for in USAC), but failed to qualify. In 1977, she entered the West Coast 250 at Ontario Motor Speedway, an event for the NASCAR Pro Series West in a Chevrolet, but failed to qualify.

Hiss retired from racing in June 1978, to pursue a business career.

== Criticism ==
During Hiss' brief career in Indy cars, she attracted criticism from people in the sport. Gary Bettenhausen said, "This is a man’s business and she has to be measured by a man’s standards if she is going to compete. By those standards, she didn't measure up." Bobby Unser, who won the Phoenix race, blamed the press for pressuring USAC to allow Hiss to run. He remarked on Hiss, "It's a sad day when some woman gets in a car and pokes around the track slower than anybody else and then all the writers and television cameras crowd around her and ignore the professionals." Bill Vukovich II was also critical of Hiss. Drivers discussed boycotting the next series event, at Trenton Speedway, if Hiss was allowed to compete, due to her being considered "dangerously slow".

However, Hiss said most drivers were supportive, and that A. J. Foyt "told everybody what a fine job I'd done" after her first USAC Stock Car race in Texas, while she and Unser later became friends.

== Racing record ==
=== USAC Champ Car results ===
(key) (Races in bold indicate pole position)

USAC Champ Car results
Year	Team	1	2	3	4	5	6	7	8	9	10	11	12	13	Rank	Points	Ref
1976	Copper State Racing	PHX; 14	TRE	INDY	MIL	POC	MCH	TWS	TRE	MIL	ONT	MCH	TWS	PHX	NR	0	

=== NASCAR ===
(key) (Bold – Pole position awarded by qualifying time. Italics – Pole position earned by points standings or practice time. * – Most laps led.)

==== Winston Cup Series ====
NASCAR Winston Cup Series results
Year	Team	No.	Make	1	2	3	4	5	6	7	8	9	10	11	12	13	14	15	16	17	18	19	20	21	22	23	24	25	26	27	28	29	30	NWCC	Pts	Ref
1976	Tom Williams Racing	38	Chevy	RSD	DAY	CAR	RCH	BRI	ATL	NWS	DAR	MAR	TAL	NSV	DOV	CLT	RSD	MCH	DAY	NSV	POC	TAL	MCH	BRI	DAR	RCH	DOV	MAR	NWS	CLT	CAR	ATL	ONT; DNQ	NA	0	
