= Bobby Olivero =

American racing driver

Bobby Olivero (born December 24, 1946, Lakewood, California), is a former American driver in the USAC Championship Car series. He raced in the 1976-1978 seasons, with 17 career starts, including the 1977 Indianapolis 500. He finished in the top-ten 11 times, with his best finish in fifth position in 1977 at Ontario.

In 1979, Olivero was the USAC Silver Crown Series champion. Earlier in his career, he won the 1975 CRA season championship.

== Complete USAC Championship Car results ==
Year	1	2	3	4	5	6	7	8	9	10	11	12	13	14	15	16	17	18	Pos	Points
1976	PHX; 13	TRE	INDY; DNQ	MIL; 10	POC; DNQ	MCH	TWS; 11	TRE	MIL	ONT; 9	MCH	TWS; DNQ	PHX; 14						24th	275
1977	ONT	PHX	TWS	TRE	INDY; 25	MIL; 6	POC; 32	MOS	MCH	TWS; 9	MIL; 6	ONT; 5	MCH; 9	PHX; 21					13th	920
1978	PHX; 9	ONT; 10	TWS; 9	TRE; 6	INDY; DNQ	MOS	MIL	POC	MCH	ATL	TWS	MIL	ONT	MCH	TRE	SIL	BRH	PHX	26th	360
1981-82	INDY	POC	ILL; 18	DUQ; 21	ISF; 20	INDY; DNP													-	0
1982–83	ISF; 1	DSF; 3	NAZ; 26	INDY; DNQ															15th	284
1983-84	DUQ; 24	INDY																	-	0

== Complete PPG Indy Car World Series results ==
Year	Team	1	2	3	4	5	6	7	8	9	10	11	12	13	14	15	16	Pos.	Pts	Ref
1982		PHX; DNQ	ATL	MIL	CLE	MCH	MIL	POC	RIV	ROA	MCH	PHX						-	0	
1983		ATL	INDY; DNP	MIL	CLE	MCH	ROA	POC	RIV	MDO	MCH	CPL	LAG	PHX				-	0	
1989		PHX	LBH	INDY; DNQ	MIL	DET	POR	CLE	MEA	TOR	MCH	POC	MDO	ROA	NAZ	LAG		-	0	
