= Hiss (surname) =

Hiss is a surname. Notable people with the surname include:

- Alger Hiss (1904–1996), U.S. State Department employee and an accused Soviet spy
- Anna Hiss (1893–1979), 20th-Century American professor of physical education
- August Hiss, Swiss footballer
- Arlene Hiss (born 1941), American former race car driver and schoolteacher
- Donald Hiss (1906–1989), younger brother of Alger Hiss
- Mike Hiss (1941–2018), former driver in the USAC Championship Car series
- Priscilla Hiss (1903–1984), a 20th-century American teacher and book editor
- Yehuda Hiss (born 1946), chief pathologist at the Abu Kabir Institute of Forensic Medicine
