= NamiRNAs =

NamiRNAs are a type of miRNAs present in the nucleus, which can activate gene expression by binding to the enhancer, and therefore were named nuclear activating miRNAs (NamiRNAs), such as miR-24-1 and miR-26. These miRNAs loci are enriched with epigenetic markers that display enhancer activity like histone H3K27ac, P300/CBP, and DNaseI high-sensitivity loci. These NamiRNAs are able to activate the related enhancers and co-work with them to up-regulate the expression of neighboring genes. NamiRNAs are able to promote global gene transcription by binding their targeted enhancers in whole genome level.

Canonically, miRNAs silence gene expression through binding to the complementary sequences of their targeted mRNAs that are often located in the 3’UTR in the cytoplasm since the first miRNA lin-4 has been found by Ambros Victor. As so far, most studies of miRNAs have focused on those in the cytoplasm.

Other than the classical theory that miRNAs down-regulate target genes by binding to the 3’UTR of mRNA, it has also been shown that miRNAs could upregulate gene expression in certain cases, just like RNAa phenomenon, which describes a picture that miRNAs can bind to the promoter of the target genes to facilitate gene transcriptions. Moreover, Vasudevan S. et al. held that miRNAs display a pattern of up-regulation on gene transcription together with AGO2 and FXR1. The discovery of NamiRNAs showcases a complementary regulatory mechanism of miRNAs, demonstrating their different roles in the nucleus and cytoplasm.

== Molecular mechanism ==
The classical theory of miRNAs is that genomic DNA first transcribes into pri-miRNAs. Next, pri-miRNAs were cleaved into pre-miRNAs by Drosha in the nucleus. Then, pre-miRNAs are transported into the cytoplasm via Exportin5, and are cut again by Dicer to form mature miRNAs. However, this theory cannot explain the distribution of miRNAs in the nucleus. One possible explanation is that miRNAs in cytoplasm can be carried back into the nucleus by some transport proteins. However, there is no direct evidence to support it. Another reasonable explanation is that pre-miRNAs could form mature miRNAs directly in the nucleus by Dicer cleavage. This is a simpler and more energy-efficient method. Yet, the molecular mechanism of NamiRNAs is still not fully understood.

NamiRNA is overlapped within the enhancer regions and it is also activated when it positively regulates its corresponding enhancers. Thus, the crosstalk between NamiRNA and enhancer will further promote a series of genes transcription. We can say that NamiRNA and enhancer mutually affect each other to form a positive feedback network and together play regulatory functions on gene expression.

== Functions ==
NamiRNAs could interact with the corresponding enhancer, enhance the enrichment of active enhancer markers like H3K27ac and H3K4me1, and change chromatin status within the enhancer regions, thus promoting the cognate gene transcription at genome-wide scale.

== Perspectives on the role ==
Traditional theory holds that miRNAs play inhibitory functions in the cytoplasm by binding the 3’ UTR of targeted mRNA and downregulate gene transcription. The discovery of NamiRNAs provides a brand-new idea that miRNAs can also play positive roles on gene expression in transcriptional level in the nucleus. To summarize, miRNAs have dual functions in gene regulation in the cytoplasm and the nucleus. That is, miRNAs play an inhibitory function in the cytoplasm and an activating function for the gene expression in the nucleus, respectively. Meanwhile, a functional network between NamiRNAs and enhancers is put forward to illustrate their roles for the positive regulation of their targeted gene transcription. NamiRNA enhancer target gene activation network demonstrates the new function of miRNA located in the nucleus.
