= Janet Guthrie =

American racing driver (born 1938)

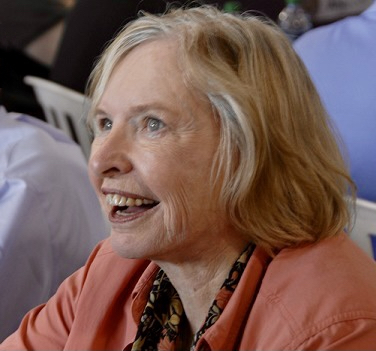
- Guthrie at the Indianapolis Motor Speedway in 2011
- Born: March 7, 1938 (age 88) Iowa City, Iowa, U.S.

Champ Car career
- 11 races run over 5 years
- Best finish: 15th (1979 (USAC))
- First race: 1976 Trenton 200 (Trenton)
- Last race: 1979 Tony Bettenhausen 200 (Milwaukee)
Wins	Podiums	Poles
0	0	0

NASCAR Cup Series career
- 33 races run over 4 years
- Best finish: 23rd (1977)
- First race: 1976 World 600 (Charlotte)
- Last race: 1980 Coca-Cola 500 (Pocono)
Wins	Top tens	Poles
0	5	0

Janet Guthrie (born March 7, 1938) is an American former racing driver. She is the first female to qualify and race in either the Indianapolis 500, or the Daytona 500, both of which she competed in during 1977. She had first attempted to enter the Indianapolis 500 in 1976 but failed to qualify. She raced in three Indianapolis 500s: 1977 through 1979. She is also the first woman to lead a lap in NASCAR Cup Series competition.

Guthrie was originally an aerospace engineer, and after graduating from the University of Michigan with a physics degree in 1960, she worked with Republic Aviation. She got the 2024 NASCAR Landmark award on January 19, 2024.

== Racing career ==
Guthrie began racing in 1963 on the SCCA circuit in a Jaguar XK140 and by 1972, she was racing on a full-time basis. Her sportscar racing career included two class wins in the famed 12 Hours of Sebring endurance race.

In the 1976 World 600, Guthrie finished fifteenth, becoming the first woman to compete in a NASCAR Winston Cup superspeedway race. Guthrie would go on to compete in four more races that season. The following season, she competed in her first Daytona 500, finishing twelfth when her car's engine blew two cylinders with ten laps to go. For her performance in the race, though, she still earned the honor of Top Rookie. Overall, Guthrie went on to compete in 33 races in NASCAR over four seasons. Her highest finish, sixth place at Bristol in 1977, is the best finish by a woman in a top-tier NASCAR race in the modern era, now currently tied with Danica Patrick in 2014.

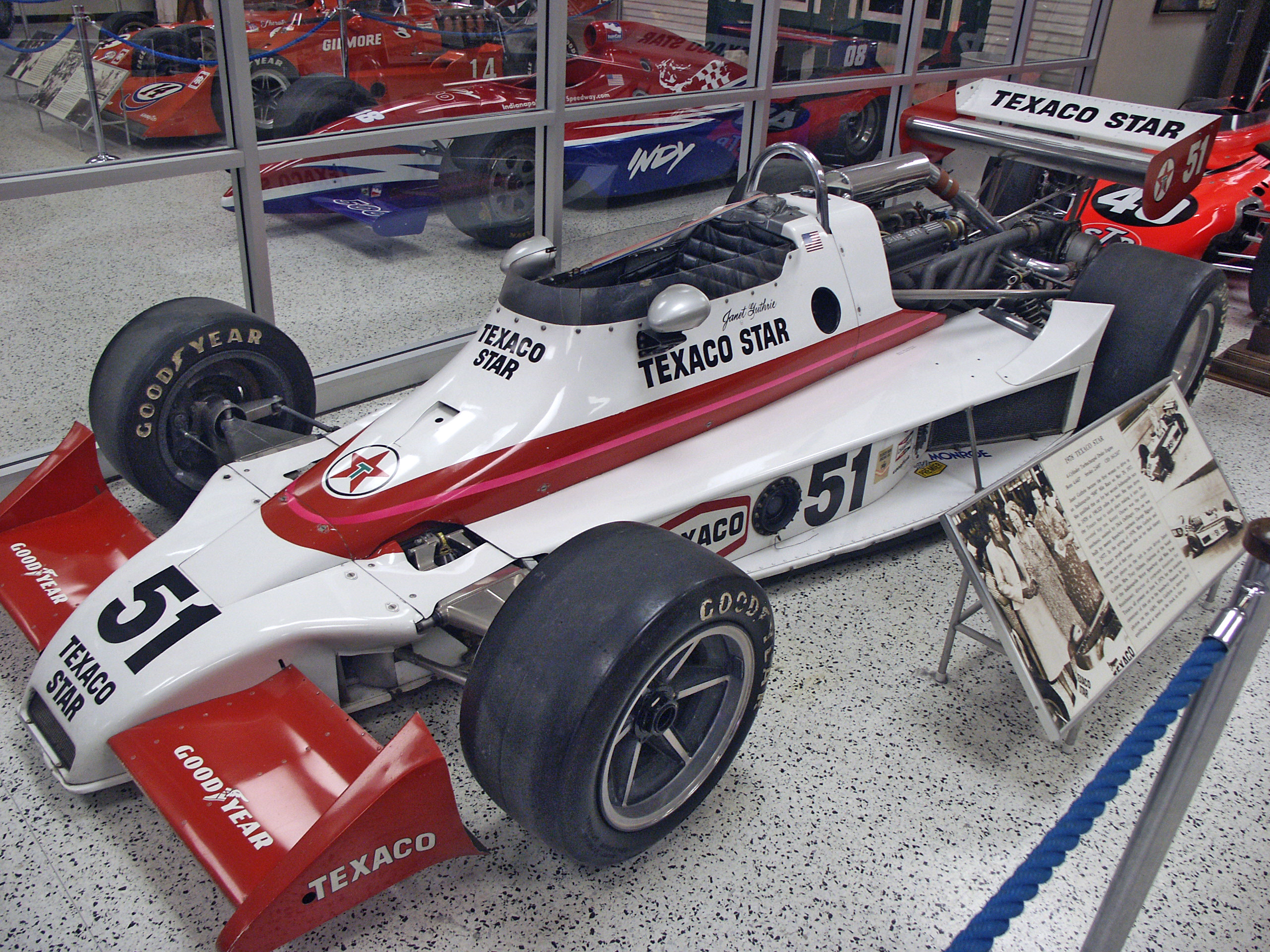
Janet Guthrie's Wildcat 3-DGS, which she drove to ninth place in the 1978 Indianapolis 500

Guthrie qualified for and competed in the 1977 Indianapolis 500, in a car entered by Rolla Vollstedt, but finished 29th with engine troubles. She would compete in two more Indianapolis 500s, finishing ninth in the 1978 race while driving with a fractured wrist (injured in a charity tennis event two days earlier) she hid from race officials. Overall, she competed in 11 Indy car events with a best finish of fifth. During her unsuccessful bid to qualify for the 1976 race, many of the drivers in the male-dominated sport stated that the reason she did not qualify was mainly due to her sex. These comments angered then three-time race winner A. J. Foyt to the point he lent Guthrie a back-up car to conduct a shake-down test. Her top practice lap in Foyt's car would have been adequate to qualify for the field. She was unable to obtain funding through corporate sponsorship, and was forced into retirement.

Nevertheless, Guthrie's place in history was secure. In 1979, the Supersisters trading card set was produced and distributed; one of the cards featured Guthrie's name and picture. Guthrie's helmet and race suit can be found in the Smithsonian Institution and she was one of the first elected to the International Women's Sports Hall of Fame. She was inducted into the International Motorsports Hall of Fame on April 27, 2006. Her 2005 autobiography, Janet Guthrie: A Life at Full Throttle, has received critical praise from such publications as Sports Illustrated.

== Battling sexism in motorsports ==
In a groundbreaking interview with Tracy Dodds for the Los Angeles Times in 1987, Guthrie lamented the lack of corporate sponsorships for female drivers:

Men are getting sponsorship and women can’t. That sounds unfair. But who cares about unfair? What counts is the bottom line. Sponsors want the publicity that racing brings. But a successful woman driver will get ten times the attention that a man will get. So, now, what really is important? It keeps coming back to the good ol’ boy network. A lot of corporations are spending a lot of tax deductible dollars to sponsor male racing drivers.

The struggle for female drivers to secure corporate sponsorships continued. When Pippa Mann lacked the funding to enter the Indianapolis 500 in 2020 despite driving the previous year, the 2020 race was left with no women drivers. Guthrie said she was unlikely to watch the 2020 race due to her disappointment. Guthrie herself initially said she was hesitant to address sexism in motorsports, but her mindset changed after she qualified for her first Indianapolis 500 in 1977 and was part of the downtown parade. As Guthrie described, “There were these guys who had little girls on their shoulders and were sort of waving these little girls as if I represented hope for the future."

In 2011, Guthrie signed a petition in support of the right of women in Saudi Arabia to drive. The petition called on Saudi King Abdullah to sponsor a Saudi Women's Grand Prix. The project was the idea of human rights activist David Keyes.

Qualified, an episode of ESPN 30 for 30 covering her racing career, aired on May 28, 2019 (Volume III, Episode 29). In it, she says, "You can go back to antiquity to find women doing extraordinary things, but their history is forgotten. Or denied to have ever existed. So women keep reinventing the wheel. Women have always done these things, and they always will."

In 2019, Guthrie was inducted into the Automotive Hall of Fame. for her achievements in motorsports. She is the 5th woman to be inducted.

== Personal life ==
Guthrie was born in Iowa City, Iowa to Jean Ruth Guthrie (née Midkiff) and William Lain Guthrie, both pilots. She is the oldest of five children. Her family moved to Miami, Florida when Janet was three years old after her father accepted a job with Eastern Air Lines. Janet herself earned her pilot's license at 17 years old.

Guthrie married Warren Levine, a charter airline pilot, in 1989. He died on December 30, 2006, of a sudden heart attack.

A feature film about Guthrie starring Hillary Swank was announced in 2021.

== Awards and honors ==
Guthrie has been inducted into the following halls of fame:

- International Women's Sports Hall of Fame (1980)
- International Motorsports Hall of Fame (2006)
- Indianapolis Motor Speedway Hall of Fame (2006)
- Automotive Hall of Fame (2019)
- NASCAR Hall of Fame (2024)
- Motorsports Hall of Fame of America (2021)

== Motorsports career results ==
=== NASCAR ===
(key) (Bold – Pole position awarded by qualifying time. Italics – Pole position earned by points standings or practice time. * – Most laps led.)

==== Winston Cup Series ====
NASCAR Winston Cup Series results
Year	Team	No.	Make	1	2	3	4	5	6	7	8	9	10	11	12	13	14	15	16	17	18	19	20	21	22	23	24	25	26	27	28	29	30	31	NWCC	Pts
1976	Lynda Ferreri	68	Chevy	RSD	DAY	CAR	RCH	BRI	ATL	NWS	DAR	MAR	TAL	NSV	DOV	CLT; 15	RSD	MCH	DAY; 15	NSV	POC	TAL	MCH	BRI	DAR	RCH	DOV; 33	MAR	NWS	CLT; 22	CAR	ATL	ONT; 20		N/A	-
1977	Lynda Ferreri	68	Chevy	RSD	DAY; 12	RCH; 12	CAR	ATL; 30	NWS	DAR	BRI; 11	MAR	TAL; 32	NSV	DOV	CLT	RSD	MCH; 26	DAY; 40	NSV; 32	POC; 11	TAL; 34	MCH; 10	BRI; 6	DAR; 16	RCH; 12	DOV; 11	MAR	NWS	CLT; 9	CAR; 9	ATL; 16	ONT; 24		23rd	2037
1978	Lynda Ferreri	68	Chevy	RSD	DAY; DNQ	RCH	CAR	ATL; 10	BRI	DAR	NWS	MAR	TAL	DOV	CLT	NSV	RSD	MCH	DAY; 11	NSV															41st	592
1978	Lynda Ferreri	68	Buick																		POC; 31	TAL; 29	MCH; 27	BRI	DAR	RCH	DOV	MAR	NWS	CLT; 35	CAR	ATL	ONT; 13		41st	592
1980	Osterlund Racing	82	Chevy	RSD	DAY; 11	RCH	CAR	ATL	BRI	DAR	NWS	MAR	TAL	NSV	DOV	CLT	TWS	RSD	MCH	DAY	NSV														69th	209
1980	McClure Motors	57	Ford																			POC; 28	TAL	MCH	BRI	DAR	RCH	DOV	NWS	MAR	CLT	CAR	ATL	ONT	69th	209

=== Indianapolis 500 ===
Year	Chassis	Engine	Start	Finish
1976	Coyote	Foyt	No qualifying attempt	
1977	Lightning	Offenhauser	26th	29th
1978	Wildcat	DGS	15th	9th
1979	Lola	Cosworth	14th	34th
1980	Lightning	Cosworth	Did not qualify	
