= F-box protein 15 =

FBXO15

Identifiers
- Aliases: FBXO15, FBX15, F-box protein 15, Fbx15
- External IDs: OMIM: 609093; MGI: 1354755; GeneCards: FBXO15

Gene location (Human)
Chr.	Chromosome 18 (human)
Band	18q22.3	Start	74,073,353 bp
Band	18q22.3	End	74,147,843 bp

Gene location (Mouse)
Chr.	Chromosome 18 (mouse)
Band	18|18 E4	Start	84,952,907 bp
Band	18|18 E4	End	84,999,598 bp
RNA expression pattern
Bgee	Human / Mouse (ortholog); Top expressed in: bronchial epithelial cell; right uterine tube; mucosa of paranasal sinus; oocyte; right testis; left testis; gonad; olfactory zone of nasal mucosa; sperm; secondary oocyte / Top expressed in: morula; morula; blastocyst; zygote; secondary oocyte; spermatocyte; seminiferous tubule; spermatid; embryo; primary oocyte; More reference expression data
BioGPS	n/a
Gene ontology
Molecular function	ubiquitin-protein transferase activity
Cellular component	ubiquitin ligase complex; cytosol
Biological process	proteasome-mediated ubiquitin-dependent protein catabolic process; protein polyubiquitination; post-translational protein modification
Sources:Amigo / QuickGO
Orthologs
Databases	NCBI: entry; OMA: entry
Species	Human	Mouse
Entrez	201456	50764
Ensembl	ENSG00000141665	ENSMUSG00000034391
UniProt	Q8NCQ5	Q9QZN0; Q3TJW2
RefSeq (mRNA)	NM_001142958; NM_152676	NM_015798; NM_001367965
RefSeq (protein)	NP_001136430; NP_689889; NP_689889.1	NP_056613
Location (UCSC)	Chr 18: 74.07 – 74.15 Mb	Chr 18: 84.95 – 85 Mb
PubMed search
- Wikidata
View/Edit Human	View/Edit Mouse

F-box protein 15 also known as Fbx15 is a protein that in humans is encoded by the FBXO15 gene.

== Function ==
Members of the F-box protein family, such as FBXO15, are characterized by an approximately 40-amino acid F-box motif. SCF complexes, formed by SKP1, cullin, and F-box proteins, act as protein-ubiquitin ligases. F-box proteins interact with SKP1 through the F box, and they interact with ubiquitination targets through other protein interaction domains.

Biochemically, Fbx15 is a substrate receptor of an ubiquitin ligase belonging to the family of the F-box proteins. Differently from other F-box proteins, Fbx15 recognizes its substrate Kif1-Binding Protein (KBP) in an acetylation dependent manner.

== Importance in embryonic stem cells ==
Fbxo15 is a protein expressed in undifferentiated embryonic stem cells.

It is expressed during coexpression of Oct3/4, c-Myc, Klf4, and SOX2, four genes identified to be important in embryonic stem cell self-renewal and differentiation repression.

In mice having a beta-galactosidase gene knocked into the Fbx15 locus, stain was detected in ES cells, early embryos (from two-cell to blastocyst stages), and testis tissue. There is an enhancer site upstream of the Fbx15-encoding transcription gene that contains an octamer-like binding motif and a Sox-like binding motif. Reporter gene analyses demonstrated that the ES cell-specific expression required this 18-bp enhancer element located approximately 500 nucleotides upstream from the transcription initiation site. Deletion or point mutation of either motif abolished the enhancer activity. It became active in NIH 3T3 cells when Oct3/4 and Sox2 were coexpressed and cooperatively bind to the enhancer sequence.

Targeted deletion of the Fbx15 gene in mice does not result in embryonic lethality or gross developmental aberrations, despite the fact that Fbx15^{-/-} mice are sub-fertile when compared to their wild-type counterparts. This might be explained by the fact that Fbx15^{-/-} embryonic stem cells display a proliferation defect - caused by the accumulation of the Fbx15 substrate KBP - generating a short-term bottleneck during the early stages of embryogenesis. In fact, targeting of KBP is required to prevent an unscheduled mitochondrial biogenesis that, in naïve pluripotent stem cells, causes increased mitochondrial oxidative phosphorylation and production of reactive oxygen species.

The selective expression of Fbx15 and its dependency on the activity of the pluripotency core factors Oct3/4 and Sox2 promoted the use of the expression of Fbx15 as the first marker of reprogramming of fibroblasts into induced pluripotent stem cells.
