= Ed Crombie =

Canadian-born American racecar driver (born 1945)

Ed Crombie (born October 13, 1945, in Williams Lake, British Columbia) is a Canadian-born former United States Auto Club Championship Car race car driver.

Crombie made four starts with a best finish of 7th at Mosport in 1977. He failed to qualify for the 1976 Indianapolis 500.

== See also ==
- List of Canadians in Champ Car
