= 1976 Indianapolis 500 =

American motor race

60th Indianapolis 500

Indianapolis Motor Speedway

Indianapolis 500
- Sanctioning body: USAC
- Season: 1976 USAC Trail
- Date: May 30, 1976
- Winner: Johnny Rutherford
- Winning team: McLaren
- Winning Chief Mechanic: Denis Daviss
- Time of race: 1:42:52.48
- Average speed: 148.725 mph (239.350 km/h)
- Pole position: Johnny Rutherford
- Pole speed: 188.957 mph (304.097 km/h)
- Fastest qualifier: Mario Andretti 189.404 mph (304.816 km/h)
- Rookie of the Year: Vern Schuppan
- Most laps led: Johnny Rutherford (48)

Pre-race ceremonies
- National anthem: Tom Sullivan & Up with People
- "Back Home Again in Indiana": Jim Nabors
- Starting command: Tony Hulman
- Pace car: Buick Century
- Pace car driver: Marty Robbins
- Starter: Pat Vidan
- Estimated attendance: 350,000

Television in the United States
- Network: ABC
- Announcers: Jim McKay and Sam Posey
- Nielsen ratings: 17.9 / 34

Chronology
| Previous | Next |
|---|---|
| 1975 | 1977 |

The 60th 500 Mile International Sweepstakes was held at the Indianapolis Motor Speedway in Speedway, Indiana on Sunday, May 30, 1976. The race unfolded as a two-man battle between Polesitter Johnny Rutherford and A. J. Foyt. Rutherford was seeking his second Indy victory, while Foyt was chasing history, looking for his record fourth "500".

Rutherford took the lead on lap 80, and was leading when rain halted the race on lap 103 (of 200). Foyt was running second, but a broken sway bar linkage was affecting his car's handling. The rain ceased after about a half hour, and officials began track drying efforts. About two hours later, the race was about to be resumed, but rain fell once again. USAC officials called the race at that point and reverted the scoring back to the completion of lap 102. Johnny Rutherford was declared the winner. Rutherford famously walked to Victory Lane, his second career Indy 500 triumph, having completed only 255 miles (410 km), the shortest official race on record. A furious Foyt settled for second, and would have to wait another year to finally achieve his record fourth "500" victory.

Hours after the race, IMS Vice President Elmer George was shot and killed during a confrontation. He had been in charge of the IMS Radio Network and was the son-in-law of IMS owner Tony Hulman. The confrontation was unrelated to the running of the race. In addition, 1976 would be the final Indy 500 for longtime radio anchor Sid Collins. After a surgery to repair a disk in his neck, Collins was still suffering muscular and neurological ailments, which made his work at the 1976 race physically difficult. He was later diagnosed with ALS, and committed suicide on May 2, 1977.

Rutherford's victory would be the final win at Indy for the venerable Offenhauser engine. It was the beginning of the end of an era which had seen 27 Indy 500 victories for the Offy powerplant. Janet Guthrie became the first female driver to enter the Indianapolis 500. However, her team was underfunded, and she experienced numerous mechanical and engine problems during the month. While she managed to pass her rookie test, and ran numerous practice laps in multiple cars, she was unable to make an attempt to qualify. She would return with a successful effort a year later in 1977.

The month of May 1976 was highlighted by the grand opening of the new Indianapolis Motor Speedway Hall of Fame Museum. Located in the track infield, the new museum replaced a much smaller facility on the corner of 16th Street and Georgetown Road. It was also the 30th anniversary of the first 500 under Tony Hulman's ownership, the 50th year since the incorporation of the Town of Speedway, and coincided with the year-long United States Bicentennial celebration.

This was the second Indy 500 victory for the McLaren team, and the third victory overall for the McLaren chassis. It was also the last victory for McLaren at the Indianapolis Motor Speedway until Mika Häkkinen won the Formula One United States Grand Prix on the combined road course in 2001.

== Race schedule ==
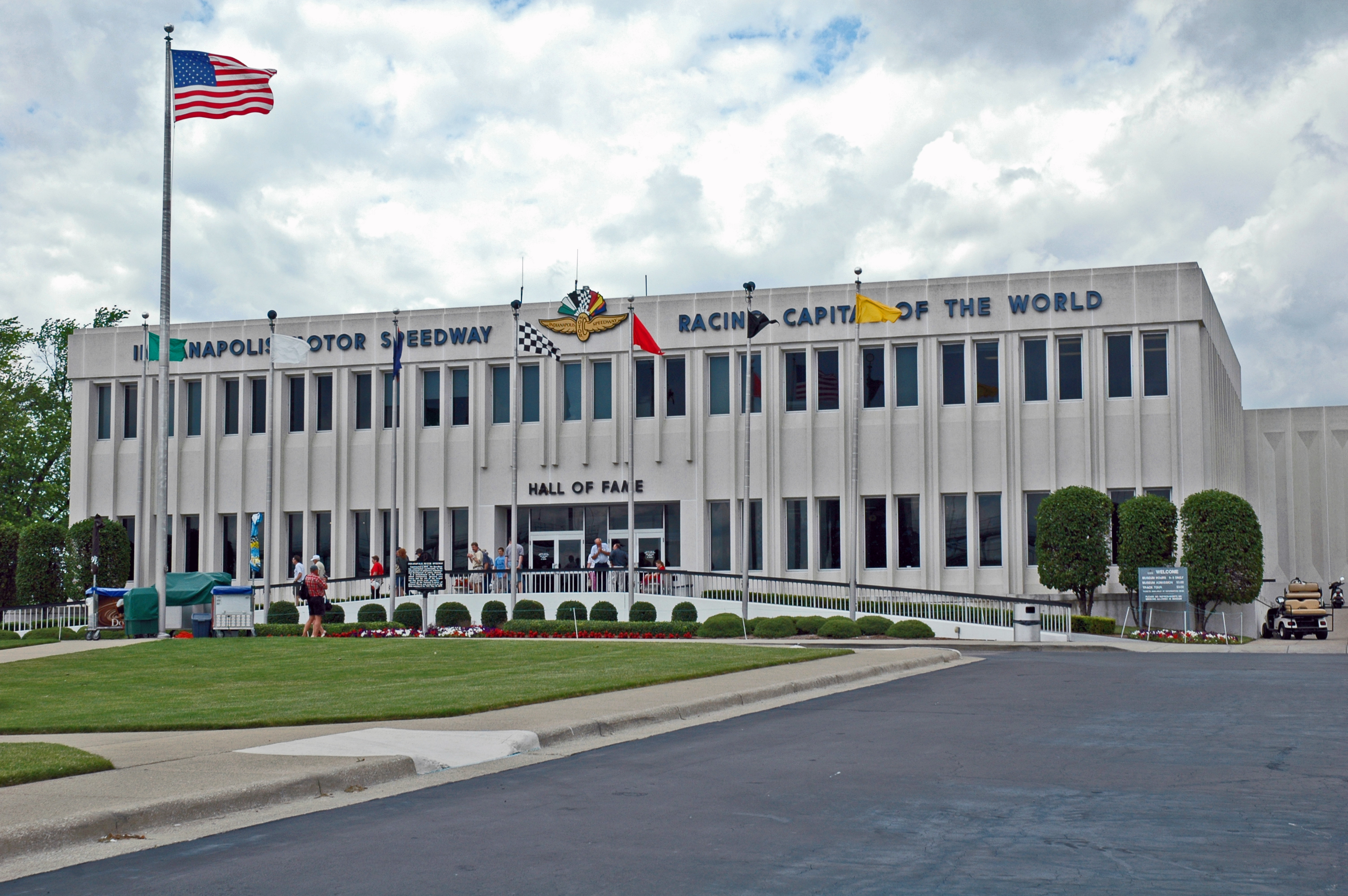
The new Hall of Fame Museum officially opened April 5.

On May 2, six days before the race cars took to the track, former Governor of California Ronald Reagan visited the Speedway. Reagan was in town campaigning for the 1976 Indiana Republican primary to be held on May 4. Reagan met with Tony Hulman, toured the Speedway, and drove around the track in one of the Buick pace cars.

Race schedule — May, 1976
| Sun | Mon | Tue | Wed | Thu | Fri | Sat |
|---|---|---|---|---|---|---|
| | | | | | | 1 |
| 2 Trenton | 3 | 4 | 5 | 6 | 7 | 8 Practice |
| 9 Practice | 10; Practice | 11; Practice | 12; Practice | 13; Practice | 14; Practice | 15; Pole Day |
| 16; Time Trials | 17; Practice | 18; Practice | 19; Practice | 20; Practice | 21; Practice | 22; Time Trials |
| 23; Time Trials | 24 | 25 | 26 | 27; Carb Day | 28 | 29; Parade |
| 30; Indy 500 | 31; Memorial Day | | | | | |

| Color | Notes |
|---|---|
| Green | Practice |
| Dark Blue | Time trials |
| Silver | Race day |
| Red | Rained out* |
| Blank | No track activity |

* Includes days where track
activity was significantly
limited due to rain

== Practice and time trials ==
For 1976, the turbocharger "boost" settings were reduced from 80 inHg (used in 1974–1975) to 75 inHG. A mild controversy swirled around the garage area, as some competitors claimed their pop-off valves were not functioning correctly. In addition, some complained that not being allowed to install the valves during practice prevented the mechanics from being able to tune their engines to optimum performance. At the time, pop-off valves were only affixed to the engines during official time trials. USAC technical supervisor Frank DelRoy dismissed the complaints, however, stating that the mechanics were simply setting their wastegates wrong.

The biggest story of practice was the appearance of Janet Guthrie, who was attempting to become the first female driver to qualify for the Indianapolis 500. Considerable media attention followed her through the month, however, the first two weeks of practice were plagued with various troubles. In addition, her participation was met with resistance by some fellow competitors. Upon her arrival at the airport, her flight lost her luggage (which included her helmet and driving suit). On the first day of practice, teammate Dick Simon was shaking the car down, but suffered an oil leak. On the second day, he burned a piston and had a turbocharger fire. Guthrie was unable to take to the track until Monday May 10. Her first foray in the machine was short-lived, as she too burned a piston after only seven laps at speed.

On Tuesday May 11, Guthrie started her rookie test, and despite low oil pressure and overheating, she completed the first phase. On Thursday May 13, she was trying to finish the second phase, but rain cut the session short. She finally completed her rookie test on Monday May 17, with a top lap of 171.429 mph.

Practice for the veterans was led by Johnny Rutherford, Al Unser and A. J. Foyt. In the third year of a rules package crafted to slow the cars down, there were no expectations of record speeds for 1976. Top speeds were in the high 180 mph range, with the best single lap for the week (189.833 mph) recorded by Rutherford. The existing track record (set in 1973) of 199.071 mph would stand for yet another year.

The most serious crash during practice was that of rookie Eddie Miller. He lost control coming out of turn one, and spun to the inside grass. The car hit an earth embankment, flipped over wildly, cleared two fences, then came to rest upside-down near the bleachers. Miller suffered a neck fracture, and would never return to Indy.

=== Pole day – Saturday May 15 ===
Overnight and morning rain delayed the start of time trials until 2:30 p.m. During Saturday's pre-qualifying practice session, Johnny Rutherford finally broke the 190 mph barrier for the month, making him the favorite for the pole position.

At 3:30 p.m., Gordon Johncock (188.531 mph) put himself tentatively on the pole. His speed would hold up to comfortably place him on the front row. About an hour later, Johnny Rutherford (188.957 mph) bumped Johncock off the top spot and would hold on to win the pole position. A. J. Foyt settled for fifth (185.261 mph), and Tom Sneva (186.355 mph) qualified for the outside of the front row.

Qualifying closed at 6 p.m. with nine cars in the field. Five drivers were still eligible for the pole position round, however, none of those left in line were considered a contender for the pole. The day closed with the front row consisting of Rutherford, Johncock, and Sneva.

=== Second day – Sunday May 16 ===
At the start of the day, only two cars (of nine) that were still eligible for the pole position round made qualifying runs. The field was filled to 11 cars, and the pole round officially concluded with Johnny Rutherford (as expected) officially winning the pole position. Moments later, the "second day" of time trials commenced. Mike Mosley (187.588 mph) and Bobby Unser (187.520 mph) were the quickest of the day, but as "second day" qualifiers, they lined up 12th and 13th, respectively.

Mario Andretti, who had departed Indianapolis a few days earlier to compete in the Belgian Grand Prix, dropped out of that race. Andretti was scheduled to return to Indianapolis soon, and begin preparing his car for a qualifying attempt on the second weekend of time trials.

=== Third day – Saturday May 22 ===
Mario Andretti returned to Indianapolis after competing in the Belgian Grand Prix. Andretti was expected to get up to speed quickly, and did not disappoint. His qualifying speed of 189.404 mph was faster than the pole speed, and Andretti became the fastest qualifier in the field. However, since he was a "third day" qualifier, he was forced to line up behind the qualifiers from the previous days. On race day, he would start in 19th on the grid.

A busy day of time trials saw the field filled to 33 cars at 5:37 p.m. The day ended with two cars bumped, and at least five drivers looking to make the field on Bump day.

Among those who did not make an attempt yet was Janet Guthrie. Still having problems finding speed in her #27 entry, her best practice lap of 173.611 mph was still too slow to bump her way in. A rumor was already circulating around the garage area that Foyt was going to lend her one of his backup cars (#1) – a car in which he practiced at over 190 mph on Friday.

=== Bump Day – Sunday May 23 ===
The story of the day was Janet Guthrie, who arranged a deal with A. J. Foyt to borrow his #1 entry for practice. Shortly after 10 a.m., Guthrie was in the car shaking it down. Her lap of 180.796 mph was easily her fastest lap of the month. Despite her considerable gains in speed, Guthrie did not end up making an attempt to qualify.

As the afternoon was winding down, the attention shifted to the cars trying to bump their way into the field in the final hour. David Hobbs bumped his way in at 4:55 p.m. Eldon Rasmussen was now on the bubble. Rasmussen survived three attempts, but at 5:59 p.m., Jan Opperman took to the track. Opperman's run of 181.717 mph bumped Rasmussen from the field, and the lineup was set.

After creating a media and fan frenzy, Janet Guthrie left the track without making the field. With the spotlight still on her, she quickly found herself an alternative. Promoter Humpy Wheeler consummated a deal for Guthrie to acquire a car from NASCAR owner Ralph Moody, and within 48 hours, flew her to Charlotte to qualify instead for the World 600.

== Starting grid ==
| Row | Inside | | Middle | | Outside | |
|---|---|---|---|---|---|---|
| 1 | 2 | (United States) Johnny Rutherford W | 20 | (United States) Gordon Johncock W | 68 | (United States) Tom Sneva |
| 2 | 21 | (United States) Al Unser W | 14 | (United States) A. J. Foyt W | 48 | (United States) Pancho Carter |
| 3 | 40 | (United States) Wally Dallenbach Sr. | 45 | (United States) Gary Bettenhausen | 5 | (United States) Bill Vukovich II |
| 4 | 69 | (United States) Larry Cannon | 12 | (United States) Mike Mosley | 3 | (United States) Bobby Unser W |
| 5 | 7 | (United States) Roger McCluskey | 93 | (United States) Johnny Parsons | 98 | (United States) John Martin |
| 6 | 17 | (United States) Dick Simon | 9 | (Australia) Vern Schuppan R | 83 | (United States) Bill Puterbaugh |
| 7 | 6 | (United States) Mario Andretti W | 73 | (United States) Jerry Grant | 28 | (United States) Billy Scott R |
| 8 | 77 | (United States) Salt Walther | 92 | (United States) Steve Krisiloff | 86 | (United States) Al Loquasto R |
| 9 | 19 | (United States) Spike Gehlhausen R | 63 | (United States) Larry McCoy | 23 | (United States) George Snider |
| 10 | 96 | (United States) Bob Harkey | 97 | (United States) Sheldon Kinser | 51 | (United States) Lloyd Ruby |
| 11 | 33 | (United Kingdom) David Hobbs | 24 | (United States) Tom Bigelow | 8 | (United States) Jan Opperman |

=== Alternates ===
- First alternate: Eldon Rasmussen (#58) – Bumped

=== Failed to qualify ===
- Bill Simpson (#38) – Bumped
- Bobby Olivero R (#78) – Bumped
- Jim McElreath (#65, #76) – Bumped
- Mike Hiss (#11) – Spun during qualifying attempt
- Bill Engelhart R (#44) – Waved off
- Mel Kenyon (#61) – Waved off
- Janet Guthrie R (#1, #17, #27) – Practiced, but did not attempt to qualify
- Larry Dickson (#65)
- Jim Hurtubise (#56)
- Jerry Karl (#8)
- Lee Kunzman (#65)
- John Mahler (#19, #91, #92)
- Rick Muther (#99)
- Ed Crombie R (#67) – Wrecked during driver's test
- Eddie Miller R (#46) – Wrecked during practice
- Woody Fisher R (#52)
- Gary Allbritain R (#75) – Entry declined

== Race summary ==
=== Start ===
Race day dawned with blue skies and temperatures in the 60s. A 60% chance for rain was in the forecast for later in the afternoon. Tony Hulman gave the command to start engines at 10:53 a.m. EST, and the field pulled away for one parade lap and one pace lap. Country singer, and part-time NASCAR driver Marty Robbins drove the Buick pace car.

At the start, polesitter Johnny Rutherford took the lead into turn one, and led the first three laps. A. J. Foyt moved up to second, then passed Rutherford for the lead on lap 4. Back in the pack, Mario Andretti charged quickly from 19th starting position to 7th in two laps. Moments later, Dick Simon blew an engine and stalled going down the backstretch, bringing out the first caution.

The green came back out on lap 7 with Foyt leading. On lap 10, Roger McCluskey lost control in turn three, hit the outside wall, then spun to the infield grass. Several cars pitted under the caution. At lap 10, the top five was Foyt, Rutherford, Johncock, Sneva, and Dallenbach. A. J. Foyt was among those who went to the pits. As he pulled away, he snagged the crewman's wing adjuster, and he drove away with the long extension wrench still attached. Foyt was about to be black-flagged, but the adjuster fell off harmlessly in turn two. The debris lengthened the yellow light period for an additional three laps. David Hobbs then suffered a water leak, and Foyt was following closely behind. Foyt nearly spun in the fluid, and narrowly avoided contact with the turn three wall.

By lap ten, Simon, Spike Gehlhausen, Bill Vukovich II, and Hobbs were all out of the race.

=== First half ===
Gordon Johncock took over the lead on lap 20, following Foyt's mishaps. Johnny Rutherford ran second, and Foyt had slipped to third position.

At lap 50, Johnny Rutherford was now leading, with Foyt second, and Johncock fading to third. Pancho Carter and Wally Dallenbach were running in the top five, with Tom Sneva close behind. Also climbing into the top ten was Salt Walther, in his best run at Indy thus far.

After running in the top ten early on, Gary Bettenhausen dropped out on lap 52 with a broken turbo wastegate. Johnny Parsons lost a right front wheel on lap 60, bringing out the yellow. Rutherford had already made a pit stop, but Foyt had not. Foyt was able to pit under the caution, and gained enough track position to take the lead for the ensuing restart on lap 65. The tone of the race was being set, a "Texas shootout" between longtime Fort Worth resident Rutherford, and Houston native Foyt.

On lap 70, Foyt led Rutherford by about 9.5 seconds. At that point, Rutherford began to close the gap. The sky was darkening, and rain was being reported in nearby Brownsburg. Rutherford charged to take the lead on lap 80, and began to pull away. At the same time, Foyt's car was showing signs of handling problems. He had suffered broken front sway bar. Both drivers were low on fuel, and were ready for their next scheduled pit stops. Foyt went in first, followed by Rutherford a couple laps later. Rutherford was able to make his stop and come out still holding the lead.

Jerry Grant ran out of fuel on lap 91, bringing out the yellow. The green came back out on lap 95 with Rutherford first and Foyt second. Rain was quickly approaching. The yellow came out for drizzle on lap 100. On lap 103, the rain began to fall harder, and the red flag was displayed, halting the race. The race was stopped at approximately 12:42 p.m. local time.

=== Rain delay ===
The cars were parked in the pits and covered with tarps, with Johnny Rutherford leading and A. J. Foyt second. In order for the race to be declared official, it had to complete one lap beyond the halfway point (101 laps). Since the race was on lap 103, it could be ruled official, and if the rains continued the rest of the afternoon, USAC could call the race at that point. Since it was only 12:45 p.m., and with 97 laps still remaining, the USAC officials elected not to call the race prematurely. However, they did begin assembling the Victory Lane platform. By 1:15 p.m., it appeared that the rain had stopped, and track drying efforts were underway in earnest. About a half hour later, some light rain began to fall again.

Under the red flag, A. J. Foyt immediately expressed anger that Rutherford had illegally gained track position during the caution period for Jerry Grant's tow-in. He claimed that Rutherford had broken the protocols for the Electro-PACER Light system, gaining as many as 13–18 seconds. Other drivers corroborated Foyt's account. However, the issue was scrapped when USAC announced the race would restart with the cars nose-to-tail, erasing any additional track position advantage Rutherford had built. In the meantime, Foyt's crew discovered the broken sway bar linkage, and were able to make repairs. The team expected the car's handling to improve if and when the race was resumed.

At about 2:15 p.m., the rain had stopped, and the sun was shining through the clouds. With safety trucks and a jet dryer circulating, the track was almost dry. At 2:45 p.m., chief steward Tom Binford announced that the race will resume in about twenty minutes, and the focus shifted to the restart procedure. The decision was made to restart the race in single file, and give the field three or four warm up laps.

At 3:00 p.m. the call was made for the cars to line up in the grid, anticipating a restart. Some drivers began climbing into their machines.

=== Finish ===
With the cars lining up in the pit lane for a restart, observers around the circuit reported a dry track, but intermittent rain drops were falling at various locations. Some drivers were already in their cockpits. Soon after, umbrellas started opening up, and the rain began to fall harder around the track. Some fans began to look for cover, and the crews quickly covered up the cars again with tarps.

At roughly 3:15 p.m., the rain was falling harder, and the officials decided that the track was "lost". They judged there was not sufficient time left in the day to wait out the shower, dry the track once again, and complete the final 97 laps before twilight set in. At that moment, USAC declared the race official. The scoring was reverted to the completion of lap 102, and Johnny Rutherford was declared the winner.

Before his crew was able to wheel the car to Victory Lane, Johnny Rutherford was surrounded by media and reporters, and famously walked to Victory Lane. He conducted the traditional winner's interview under an umbrella. An irritated A. J. Foyt finished second, still searching for his fourth Indy victory. Jim McKay described Foyt as a "man caged by fate", as he had been angrily pacing up and down pit lane waiting for the race to resume. After a brief television interview, Foyt stormed back to his garage without further comments to the media.

== Box score ==
| Finish | Start | No | Name | Chassis | Engine | Qual | Laps | Time/Retired |
|---|---|---|---|---|---|---|---|---|
| 1 | 1 | 2 | (United States) Johnny Rutherford W | McLaren M16 | Offenhauser | 188.957 | 102 | 148.725 mph |
| 2 | 5 | 14 | (United States) A. J. Foyt W | Coyote | Foyt V-8 | 185.262 | 102 | +15.36 |
| 3 | 2 | 20 | (United States) Gordon Johncock W | Wildcat | DGS | 188.531 | 102 | +1:44.95 |
| 4 | 7 | 40 | (United States) Wally Dallenbach | Wildcat | DGS | 184.445 | 101 | Flagged (-1 lap) |
| 5 | 6 | 48 | (United States) Pancho Carter | Eagle | Offenhauser | 184.824 | 101 | Flagged (-1 lap) |
| 6 | 3 | 68 | (United States) Tom Sneva | McLaren M16 | Offenhauser | 186.355 | 101 | Flagged (-1 lap) |
| 7 | 4 | 21 | (United States) Al Unser W | Parnelli | Cosworth DFX | 186.258 | 101 | Flagged (-1 lap) |
| 8 | 19 | 6 | (United States) Mario Andretti W | McLaren M16 | Offenhauser | 189.404 | 101 | Flagged (-1 lap) |
| 9 | 22 | 77 | (United States) Salt Walther | McLaren M16 | Offenhauser | 182.796 | 100 | Flagged (-2 laps) |
| 10 | 12 | 3 | (United States) Bobby Unser W | Eagle | Offenhauser | 187.520 | 100 | Flagged (-2 laps) |
| 11 | 30 | 51 | (United States) Lloyd Ruby | Eagle | Offenhauser | 186.480 | 100 | Flagged (-2 laps) |
| 12 | 14 | 93 | (United States) Johnny Parsons | Eagle | Offenhauser | 182.843 | 98 | Flagged (-4 laps) |
| 13 | 27 | 23 | (United States) George Snider | Eagle | Offenhauser | 181.141 | 98 | Flagged (-4 laps) |
| 14 | 32 | 24 | (United States) Tom Bigelow | Eagle | Offenhauser | 181.965 | 98 | Flagged (-4 laps) |
| 15 | 11 | 12 | (United States) Mike Mosley | Eagle | Offenhauser | 187.588 | 98 | Flagged (-4 laps) |
| 16 | 33 | 8 | (United States) Jan Opperman | Eagle | Offenhauser | 181.717 | 97 | Flagged (-5 laps) |
| 17 | 10 | 69 | (United States) Larry Cannon | Eagle | Offenhauser | 181.388 | 97 | Flagged (-5 laps) |
| 18 | 17 | 9 | (Australia) Vern Schuppan R | Eagle | Offenhauser | 182.011 | 97 | Flagged (-5 laps) |
| 19 | 29 | 97 | (United States) Sheldon Kinser | Dragon | Offenhauser | 181.114 | 97 | Flagged (-5 laps) |
| 20 | 28 | 96 | (United States) Bob Harkey | Kingfish | Offenhauser | 181.141 | 97 | Flagged (-5 laps) |
| 21 | 15 | 98 | (United States) John Martin | Dragon | Offenhauser | 182.417 | 96 | Flagged (-6 laps) |
| 22 | 18 | 83 | (United States) Bill Puterbaugh | Eagle | Offenhauser | 182.002 | 96 | Flagged (-6 laps) |
| 23 | 21 | 28 | (United States) Billy Scott R | Eagle | Offenhauser | 183.383 | 96 | Flagged (-6 laps) |
| 24 | 23 | 92 | (United States) Steve Krisiloff | Eagle | Offenhauser | 182.131 | 95 | Flagged (-7 laps) |
| 25 | 24 | 86 | (United States) Al Loquasto R | McLaren M16 | Offenhauser | 182.002 | 95 | Flagged (-7 laps) |
| 26 | 26 | 63 | (United States) Larry McCoy | Ras-Car | Offenhauser | 181.387 | 91 | Flagged (-11 laps) |
| 27 | 20 | 73 | (United States) Jerry Grant | Eagle | AMC | 183.617 | 91 | Flagged (-11 laps) |
| 28 | 8 | 45 | (United States) Gary Bettenhausen | Eagle | Offenhauser | 181.791 | 52 | Turbocharger |
| 29 | 31 | 33 | (United Kingdom) David Hobbs | McLaren M16 | Offenhauser | 183.580 | 10 | Water Leak |
| 30 | 13 | 7 | (United States) Roger McCluskey | Lightning | Offenhauser | 186.499 | 8 | Crash T3 |
| 31 | 9 | 5 | (United States) Bill Vukovich Jr. | Eagle | Offenhauser | 181.433 | 2 | Rod |
| 32 | 16 | 17 | (United States) Dick Simon | Vollstedt | Offenhauser | 182.342 | 1 | Rod |
| 33 | 25 | 19 | (United States) Spike Gehlhausen R | McLaren M16 | Offenhauser | 181.717 | 0 | Oil Pressure |

W Former Indianapolis 500 winner

R Indianapolis 500 Rookie

All cars utilized Goodyear tires.

=== Race statistics ===
Lap Leaders
| Laps | Leader |
|---|---|
| 1–3 | Johnny Rutherford |
| 4–13 | A. J. Foyt |
| 14–16 | Pancho Carter |
| 17–19 | Wally Dallenbach |
| 20–37 | Gordon Johncock |
| 38 | Tom Sneva |
| 39–60 | Johnny Rutherford |
| 61–79 | A. J. Foyt |
| 80–102 | Johnny Rutherford |

Total laps led
| Driver | Laps |
|---|---|
| Johnny Rutherford | 48 |
| A. J. Foyt | 29 |
| Gordon Johncock | 18 |
| Pancho Carter | 3 |
| Wally Dallenbach Sr. | 3 |
| Tom Sneva | 1 |

PACER Yellow Light Periods
6 for 21 laps
| Laps | Reason |
|---|---|
| 4–6 | Dick Simon stalled in turn 3 (3:46) |
| 10–13 | Roger McCluskey crash in turn 3 (3:30) |
| 14–16 | Debris; adjuster wrench from Foyt's car (5:46) |
| 60–64 | Johnny Parsons lost wheel on backstretch (7:45) |
| 91–94 | Jerry Grant stalled; out of fuel on backstretch (6:11) |
| 101–103 | Rain (red flag); race ended |

== Legacy ==
Rutherford capped off a three-year stint with finishes of 1st-2nd-1st from 1974 to 1976, tied for the best three-year span in Indy history. It was equaled by Wilbur Shaw in 1937–1940 (1st–2nd–1st–1st), Al Unser in 1970–1972 (1st–1st–2nd) and by Hélio Castroneves in 2001–2003 (1st–1st–2nd).

As of 2026, the 1976 race is the shortest Indy 500 on record, completing only 102 laps (255 miles) out of the scheduled 200 laps. By USAC rule, the race was required to complete 101 laps – one lap beyond the halfway point – to be considered official and full points, unlike most motorsport that use a rule under the FIA Code requiring just three green flag laps for an official race with a percentage of points on a sliding scale with three-fourths distance required for full points. It is also regarded as the "shortest" 500 mile race in a major U.S. series. Among other rain-shortened 500-mile races, the 1980 CRC Chemicals Rebel 500 that was the 105th and final win by David Pearson went 189 laps (258.67 miles) because of darkness after a weather delay caused by rain and hail lasting more than two-hours on Lap 106 of 367, and NASCAR attempted to restart the race with only one hour before sunset in order to reach the minimum distance, the only other 500 mile race that ran less than 260 miles.

At one lap beyond official rate status, a 2002 NASCAR Xfinity Series race at Darlington Raceway is the shortest race with similar rules. The 147-lap, 200.8 mile race won by Jeff Burton in August 2002 ran only to the minimum—74 laps. There have been a NASCAR Xfinity Series and Craftsman Truck Series race each that have ended at less than half distance, but declared official because both points-paying interval laps were completed—Sheldon Creed's 2020 win at Kentucky Speedway, which was flagged for lightning after two 35-lap stages were completed of the 150-lap race, and Noah Gragson's 2022 Kansas Speedway win, which ended because of rain after two 45-lap stages of the 200-lap race were completed. In 2023, Cole Custer won the NASCAR Xfinity Series race on the Chicago Street Circuit after 25 of a planned 55 laps because of lighting and regulations from NASCAR's contract with the City of Chicago, causing the race to end before official status for the first time since the 1961 Virginia 500 at Martinsville Speedway, which lasted 149 laps of 500. It was counted as a championship race, but a replacement would be held later in the year that also counted for points.

The 1976 race was the third race in four years (1973, 1975, 1976) to end rain-shortened. There would not be another rain-shortened Indy 500 until 2004. Rutherford's win from the pole was also somewhat trend-setting - only three other drivers had done so in the previous 22 years. Over the next six years, the polesitter would finish either 1st or 2nd. It was also the last rain-shortened race where victory lane was used. In 2004 and 2007, victory lane would not be used but instead, the winning car is driven or pushed inside the Master Control Tower (often nicknamed the Pagoda until 1955, and again since 2000), where the winner's ceremonies are now conducted indoors in case of inclement weather.

This was also the final 500 victory for the four-cylinder Offenhauser engine. Starting in 1977, the V-8 engines (from both Cosworth and Foyt) would start to make the four cylinder engine obsolete. 1980 was the real last hurrah for the engine, as the DGS version placed third with Gary Bettenhausen. No four-cylinder engine would qualify for the race beginning in 1981.

== Broadcasting ==
=== Radio ===
The race was carried live on the IMS Radio Network. The network celebrated its 25th anniversary. Sid Collins served as chief announcer for the 25th time. Unbeknownst to all involved, 1976 would be the final Indy 500 for Collins. After a surgery to repair a disk in his neck, Collins was still suffering muscular and neurological ailments, which made his work at the 1976 race physically difficult. He was later diagnosed with ALS, and committed suicide on May 3, 1977.

This would be the third and final time Paul Page reported from the pit area. The following year he would be elevated to the chief announcer position. In addition, third-year veteran Jerry Baker would report from the backstretch for the final time, starting in 1977 he was a pit reporter. Bob Forbes served as the wireless roving reporter in the garages. The broadcast reached over 1,200 affiliates, including foreign language translations into Spanish, French, Italian, and Portuguese. It was picked up by Armed Forces Radio, and also transmitted to Japan, Central America and South America.

Indianapolis Motor Speedway Radio Network
| Booth Announcers | Turn Reporters | Pit/garage reporters |
|---|---|---|
| Chief Announcer: Sid Collins; Driver expert: Fred Agabashian; Statistician: John DeCamp; Historian: Donald Davidson | Turn 1: Ron Carrell; Turn 2: Howdy Bell; Backstretch: Jerry Baker; Turn 3: Doug Zink; Turn 4: Jim Shelton | Paul Page (north pits); Chuck Marlowe (north-center pits); Luke Walton (south-center pits); Lou Palmer (south pits); Bob Forbes (garages) |

Collins customarily ended his broadcasts with "words of wisdom", vignettes, or a set-piece monologue for the listeners. His final broadcast was closed with the following sign-off quote:

So now, the 60th running of the 500 here is now history. Since 1911, the hypnotic effect of speed upon driver and spectator alike is never dim. The run from the green flag to the checkered and on to Victory Lane here is a pursuit that only one man in the world can accomplish once a year. Today, once again, Johnny Rutherford etched his name and his achievement upon the granite of time. He reigns supreme as the champion of the sport of auto racing this day and forever more. The massive crowd of more than 350,000 has threaded its way towards the exit gates as their eyes have taken a final sweep over the track before departing. For some, this has been a once-in-a-lifetime experience. Others will come back, but in every case, it's always difficult to relinquish one's grasp on the pulsating emotion that is the 500. And at this microphone, we share that reaction of having to say goodbye to you across the many miles that separate us. But, another icy Indiana winter will come and go, and before we know it, springtime returns. It will be May, and the roar of engines will once again breathe life into the lazy Hoosier sky and bring us back together. God willing, I'll be here to greet you for this annual reunion through our mutual love of auto racing and the Indianapolis 500.

And now this final thought for our winner. Enthusiasm with wisdom will carry a man further than any amount of intellect without it. The men who have most-powerfully influenced the world have not been so much men of genius, as they have been men of strong conviction with an enduring capacity for work coupled with enthusiasm and determination. Johnny Rutherford showed these qualities today in becoming victorious over the Indianapolis 500.

So until next May, this is Sid Collins, the Voice of the 500, wishing you good morning, good afternoon or good evening, depending upon where in the world you are right now. We're here at the Indianapolis Motor Speedway at the Crossroads of America. Goodbye.

=== Television ===
The race was carried in the United States on ABC Sports on a same-day tape delay basis. Jim McKay returned to anchor the broadcast, after sitting out the 1975 race. Analyst Jackie Stewart was absent from the broadcast, as he was in Monte Carlo for coverage of the Monaco Grand Prix, to be aired on ABC's Wide World of Sports the following weekend. Stewart, however, did record interviews during the month that aired during the Indy 500 broadcast. Stewart was paired with Keith Jackson at Monaco, the same pairing that had called the previous year's "500" on ABC in 1975. Former driver Sam Posey joined McKay at Indianapolis, his second time on the crew as booth analyst, and third year overall.

"Heavy Action" was used in an "Indianapolis 500" opening for the first time as Monday Night Football Producers Roone Arledge and Chuck Howard along with Directors Larry Kamm and Don Ohlmeyer also did work on this broadcast.

ABC Television
| Booth Announcers | Pit/garage reporters |
|---|---|
| Host: Chris Schenkel; Announcer: Jim McKay; Color: Sam Posey | Chris Economaki; Bill Flemming; Jackie Stewart (Features) |

== Notes ==
=== See also ===
- 1976 USAC Championship Car season

=== Works cited ===
- 1976 Indianapolis 500 Press Information - Daily Trackside Summary
- Indianapolis 500 History: Race & All-Time Stats - Official Site
- 1976 Indianapolis 500 Radio Broadcast, Indianapolis Motor Speedway Radio Network

| 1975 Indianapolis 500; Bobby Unser | 1976 Indianapolis 500; Johnny Rutherford | 1977 Indianapolis 500; A. J. Foyt |
