= Jan Opperman =

American racing driver

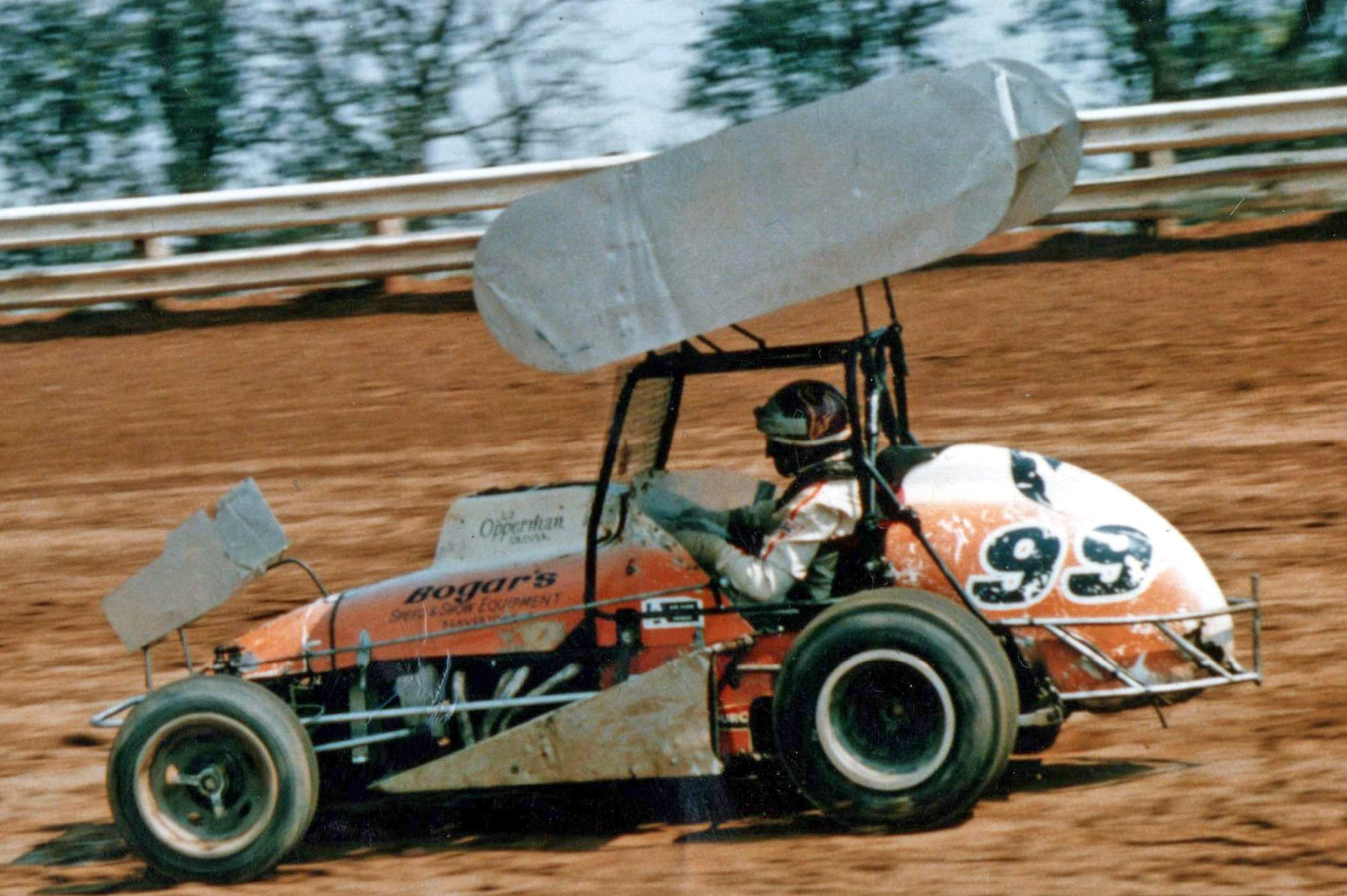
Opperman driving at Williams Grove Speedway in the 1970s

Jan Opperman (February 9, 1939 – September 4, 1997), was an American racecar driver. He won the 1971 Knoxville Nationals, the premiere event in sprint car racing. In 1976, he won the Hulman Classic at Terre Haute, Ind., which at the time featured most of the top sprint car drivers in the country and had several drivers in the field who would start the Indianapolis 500 later that month.

Born in Long Beach, California, Opperman died in Fountain, Florida, 16 years after suffering critical injuries from a crash during a race in Jennerstown, Pennsylvania. Known primarily as a sprint car driver, he also drove in the USAC Championship Car series, racing in the 1974 and 1976 seasons. He had nine champ car starts, including the 1974 and 1976 Indianapolis 500 with three top-ten finishes.

Considered a natural driving talent, Opperman attracted the attention of Indy 500 veterans Parnelli Jones and A. J. Foyt. His first start at Indianapolis came with the team co-owned by Jones, a sprint car veteran and winner of the 1963 Indianapolis 500. Opperman spent his early sprint car racing career running "outlaw" rather than sticking to one sanctioning body. He won dozens of races each year traveling across the country from race track to race track in pursuit of the best paying races. Opperman would earn the title of one of the “Original Outlaws” in 1968 when Jerry Janssen, a Speedway Motors employee, discovered him in California racing a sprint car powered by a Ranger airplane engine. Janssen brought Opperman to Lincoln, kickstarting his successful career. Opperman was just hitting his stride in the elite United States Auto Club's, sprint, midget and dirt car (called Silver Crown division today) divisions when he suffered critical head injuries while battling for the lead of the Hoosier Hundred at the Indianapolis State Fairgrounds in early September 1976. Opperman missed the 1977 season, but returned to racing on the outlaw circuit in 1978 but never again attained the level of success he achieved before that accident. Opperman suffered severe head injuries again in 1981, in an accident that left him disabled and needing constant medical care for the rest of his life.

Early in his career, Opperman was known as a hippie and part of the drug culture. During the 1960s when living in Beaver Crossing, Nebraska, he became a dynamic Christian, and, until his catastrophic accident, was working toward creating a ranch in western Montana for troubled youth.

One of Opperman's trademarks was a battered western hat that had been worn by his brother, Jay, who died while racing a sprint car at Knoxville Raceway on May 16, 1970.

== Awards ==
- Opperman was inducted in the National Sprint Car Hall of Fame in the first class in 1990.
- Opperman was inducted in 2011 to the International Motor Sports Hall of Fame in Talladega, AL.

=== Indianapolis 500 results ===
Year	Chassis	Engine	Start	Finish
1974	Parnelli	Offy	32nd	21st
1975	Eagle	Offy	Failed To Qualify	
1976	Eagle	Offy	33rd	16th
