= Sheldon Kinser =

American race car driver

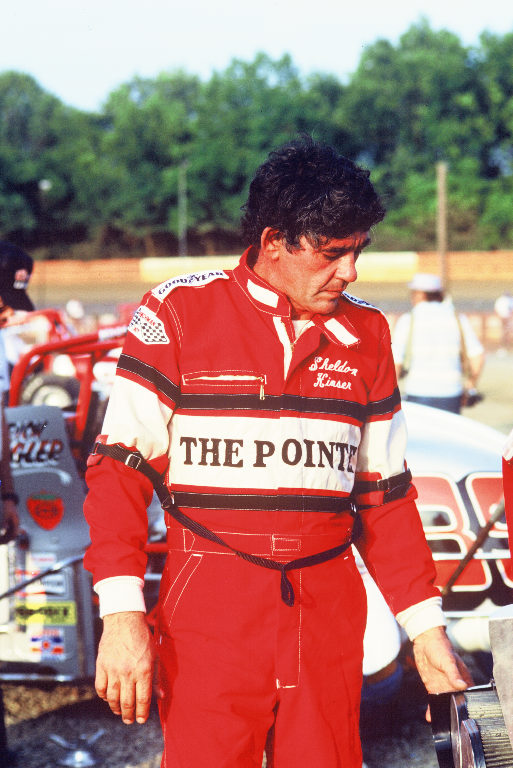
Sheldon Kinser at a sprint car race in Hagerstown, Maryland in 1986

Sheldon Kinser (December 9, 1942 – August 1, 1988) was an American auto racing driver.

Kinser, a Bloomington, Indiana native, died of cancer. He was a three-time USAC Sprint Car Series Champion (1977, 1981, 1982). He also drove in the USAC and CART Championship Car series. He competed during the 1975–1983 seasons, with 44 combined career starts, including six in the Indianapolis 500. He failed to qualify for the race on three other occasions. He had 13 top-ten finishes, with a best of third at both Texas World Speedway in 1979 and Springfield in 1982.

Kinser was the second cousin once removed of Steve Kinser, the 20-time World of Outlaws sprint-car champion, and the second cousin twice removed of Mark Kinser. He was inducted into the National Sprint Car Hall of Fame in 1992.

== Indianapolis 500 results ==
Year	Chassis	Engine	Start	Finish
1975	King	Offenhauser	26th	12th
1976	King	Offenhauser	29th	19th
1977	King	Offenhauser	12th	32nd
1978	Watson	Offenhauser	12th	32nd
1979	Watson	Offenhauser	10th	28th
1980	Watson	Cosworth	Failed to Qualify	
1981	Longhorn	Cosworth	23rd	6th
1982	SEA	Cosworth	Failed to Qualify	
1983	March	Chevrolet	Failed to Qualify	
