= Boger =

Boger or Böger is a surname. Notable people with the surname include:

- Alnod Boger (1871–1940), English cricketer
- Dale L. Boger (born 1953), American medicinal and organic chemist, chair of the Department of Chemistry at The Scripps Research Institute
- David Boger (1939–2025), Australian chemical engineer
- Ernest Boger, African-American student
- Haim Boger (1876–1963), Israeli politician who served as a member of the Knesset for the General Zionists between 1951 and 1955
- Jerome Boger (born 1955), American football official in the National Football League
- Joshua Boger (born 1951), American chemist
- Luciano Durán Böger (1904–1996), Bolivian poet, writer and politician
- Stefan Böger (born 1966), German football player and manager
- Wilhelm Boger (1906–1977), German police commissioner and concentration camp overseer known as "The Tiger of Auschwitz"
- William Otway Boger (1895–1918), Canadian World War I flying ace

== See also ==
- Boger City, North Carolina, unincorporated community in Lincoln County, North Carolina, United States
- Boger-Hartsell Farm, historic home and farm near Concord, Cabarrus County, North Carolina
- Constant viscosity elastic (Boger) fluids, elastic fluids with constant viscosity
- Boge (disambiguation)
- Bogger (disambiguation)
- Booger (disambiguation)
- Borger (disambiguation)
- Oger (disambiguation)
