= Dick Trickle =

American racing driver (1941-2013)

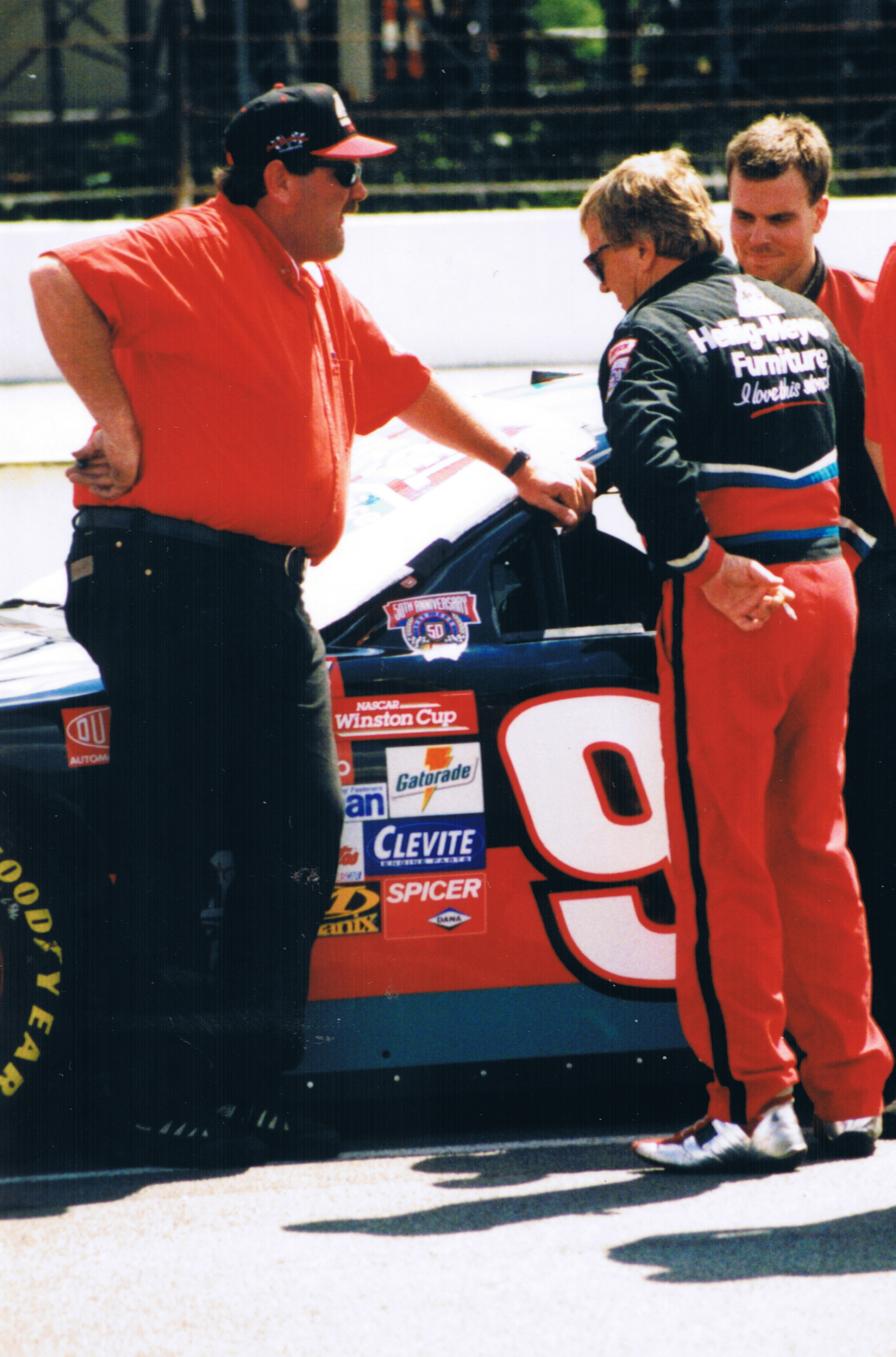
- Trickle (right, facing away) in 1998
- Born: Richard Leroy Trickle; October 27, 1941; Wisconsin Rapids, Wisconsin, U.S.
- Died: May 16, 2013 (aged 71); Boger City, North Carolina, U.S.
- Cause of death: Self inflicted gunshot
- Achievements: 1977, 1979, 1980, 1983, 1984, 1985, 1987 ARTGO Challenge Series Champion; 1984, 1985 ASA National Tour Champion; 1984, 1985, 1986 World Series of Asphalt Super Late Model Champion; 1971, 1987 Oktoberfest Winner; 1978 Florida Governor's Cup Winner; 1979, 1985 Cracker 200 Winner; 1982, 1983, 1985, 1989 Slinger Nationals Winner; 1983 World Crown 300 Winner; 1987, 1988 Redbud 400 Winner
- Awards: 1968 USAC Stock Car Rookie of the Year; 1989 NASCAR Winston Cup Series Rookie of the Year

NASCAR Cup Series career
- 303 races run over 24 years
- Best finish: 15th (1989)
- First race: 1970 Daytona 500 Qualifier #2 (Daytona)
- Last race: 2002 MBNA Platinum 400 (Dover)
Wins	Top tens	Poles
0	36	1

NASCAR O'Reilly Auto Parts Series career
- 158 races run over 11 years
- Best finish: 11th (1999)
- First race: 1984 Red Carpet 200 (Milwaukee)
- Last race: 2001 Outback Steakhouse 300 (Kentucky)
- First win: 1997 Galaxy Foods 300 (Hickory)
- Last win: 1998 Dura-Lube 200 Presented by BI-LO (Darlington)
Wins	Top tens	Poles
2	42	7

Richard Leroy Trickle (October 27, 1941 – May 16, 2013) was an American race car driver. He raced for decades around the short tracks of Wisconsin, winning many championships along the way. Trickle competed in the ASA, ARTGO, ARCA, All Pro, IMCA, NASCAR, and USAC.

In more than an estimated 2,200 races, Trickle logged one million laps and is believed to have won over 1,200 feature races. He was billed as the winningest short track driver in history. Trickle's career highlights include racing to 67 wins in 1972, winning seven ARTGO Championships in nine years between 1979 and 1987, winning back to back ASA AC-Delco Challenge championships in 1984 and 1985, the 1968 USAC Stock Car rookie of the year, and winning the 1989 NASCAR Rookie of the Year award in the Winston Cup Series. Trickle was nicknamed the "White Knight" as referenced by his sponsored SuperAmerica paint scheme, when he raced in Wisconsin.

== Early life ==
Eight-year-old Dick Trickle was playing tag with his cousin Verlon on the rafters in a house under construction when he fell two floors to the basement and broke his hip. He was transferred from a local hospital to the University of Wisconsin Hospital and continued his slow recovery. His recovery was so slow that the doctors gave up and sent him home, presuming that he would be an invalid for the rest of his life. Trickle later began to walk, although he walked with a slight limp for the rest of his life. He spent three years in a cast from his waist to his foot. While he was recovering as a nine-year-old, a friend took him to his first races at Crown Speedway in his hometown of Wisconsin Rapids, Wisconsin. "When I got there I was flabbergasted," Trickle said. "I thought it was the neatest thing. Free shows were nothing compared to it. That race never left my mind until I was 16. I knew I was going to drive a race car when I was 16."

Trickle married Darlene in 1961. They originally lived at his grandmother's house for a while before they bought a trailer on someone else's property. His nephew, Chris Trickle, was a race car driver before dying in a drive-by shooting.

== Racing career ==
=== Wisconsin short track career ===
Trickle's family lived on welfare, so there was no money available for racing. Trickle spent his summers working for area farmers, starting as a thirteen-year-old. He also spent a lot of time at the Rudolph Blacksmith shop that his father was a partner in. While his father was ill, his uncle Leonard ran the shop.

"I worked part time at the shop to earn a nickel or dime," Trickle said. "At that age, it was mostly sweeping the shop, but I started to play with the welder and soon I could make an arc and then weld. I started junking machinery. I save some things getting a head start for when I would go racing at 16. I didn't have any money, but I had this pile of stuff to build a race car with. It was a hope chest."

"When I turned 16, I let the farmer I was working for keep most of the money I earned, until fall. That fall I collected my money, and went down Main Street, wheeling and dealing. I finally bought a 1950 Ford in good condition for $100. It was going to be my street car, but the urge to race got too strong and I cut it up, and made a stock car out of it."

"I did run the car a little bit before I cut it up and I ended up drag racing a classmate, Melvin Hunsinger, who had a 1949 Ford. He beat me. It seems kind of dumb when I already knew there was a car that could beat me. Eventually, I bought Hunsinger's 1949 Ford for $32.50 and put the motor in my car".

Trickle started out as the slowest car in a 100-car field at a Stratford, Wisconsin short track race. He raced that car at the end of the 1958 season and throughout the 1959 season, after which time he built a 1956 Ford into a race car using all of the knowledge that he had acquired. In his first time out with the new car, he finished second in the feature event at Griffith Park at Wisconsin Rapids. His competitors checked the rules and found out that Trickle was too young to race, even though he had already raced there for two years. He had to race at other tracks for a year until he was old enough to race at his hometown track. He raced for several years before deciding to race full-time. After working at several jobs after high school, he had worked for two years for a local telephone company. He had been uncomfortable climbing telephone poles as he was afraid of heights. He transferred to a different part of the company. Two or three years later he discussed racing full-time with his wife for he felt that he could be profitable, and they decided to make the change.

Trickle raced at over one-hundred events each year for over fifteen years. He was racing at the Tomah-Sparta Speedway when Francis Kelly noticed that Trickle was always in contention for winning the races, but he lost a lot of them because he had an inferior motor. One day Kelly approached Trickle and asked him what it would cost for Trickle to win. Trickle told him a new motor; Kelly asked Trickle to compile a list of parts that he needed. When Kelly asked who would assemble the motor, Trickle responded that he could but he was a junkyard mechanic. Trickle suggested that Alan Kulwicki's father Jerry Kulwicki, who was building motors for Norm Nelson's USAC stock cars, should build the engine.

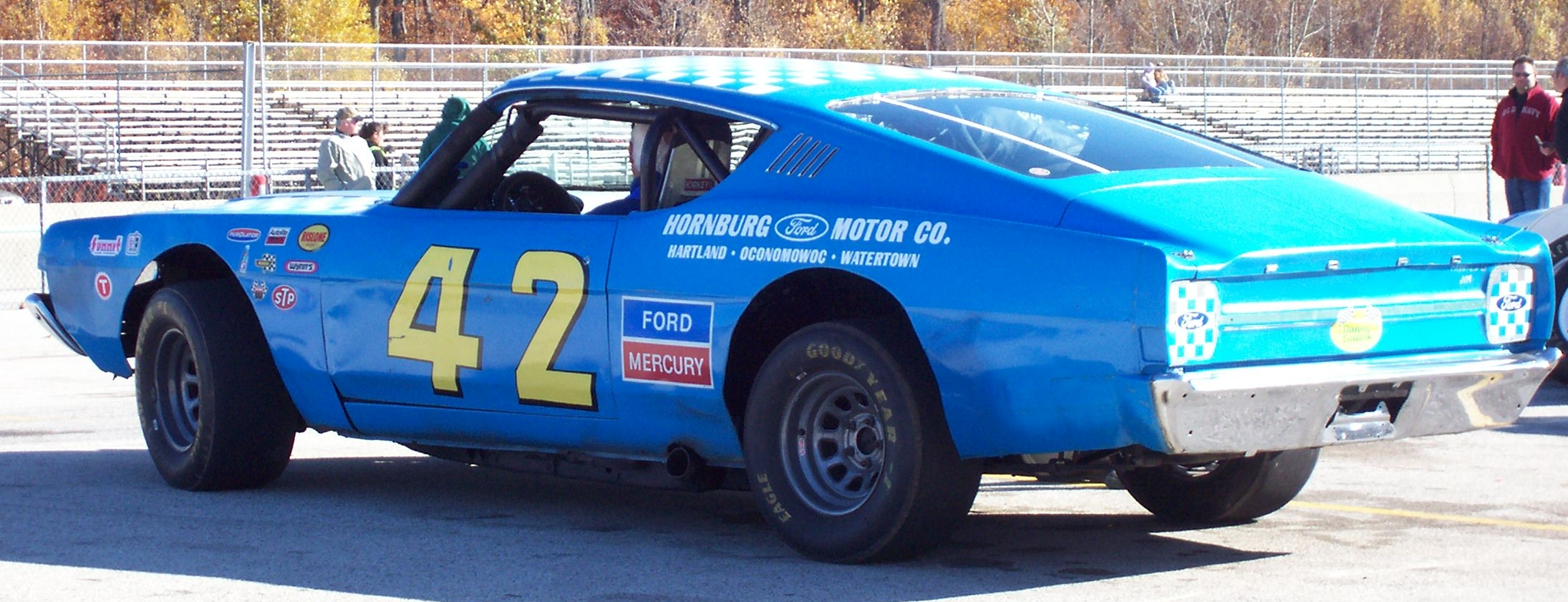
Trickle's 1968 Ford Torino, raced on Wisconsin tracks

A turning point in Trickle's career happened at the National Short Track Championship race at Rockford Speedway in 1966. Trickle said, "The cars in that area were fancier and looked like they were ahead of us. They didn't treat us bad, but they sort of giggled at us kids with the rat cars. After two days, they look differently at those rat cars. I won and pocketed $1,645. Before, I questioned spending the money to travel that far. But if you could win, that was a different story." Trickle started the 1967 season by winning at State Park Speedway and ended the season with 25 feature victories including wins at Wisconsin Dells Speedway (now Dells Raceway Park) and Golden Sands Speedway (near Wisconsin Rapids).

He toured on the Central Wisconsin Racing Association (CWRA) tracks in 1971. The circuit consisted of larger asphalt track racing on most nights of the week. The CWRA regular drivers were able to run over 100 events in a year, and most did the tour with one car and one engine. Drivers would drive on Wednesday nights at La Crosse Fairgrounds Speedway, Thursday nights at State Park Speedway near Wausau, Friday nights at Capitol Speedway (now Madison International Speedway) near Madison, La Crosse, or Adams-Friendship, Saturday nights at Wisconsin Dells Speedway, and Sunday nights at Griffith Park. Tuesday nights were available for special events.

On Thursday nights at the quarter mile State Park Speedway, he won seven features and lowered his July 1 14.27 second track record to 14.09 seconds on the following week. On Friday nights, he raced primarily at Capitol Speedway, winning most nights that it did not rain and his car did not break. Trickle went to Adams-Friendship on July 23 and won the feature after setting the track record. He held the track record at six tracks: Adams-Friendship, Capitol, Wausau, Wisconsin Dells, and La Crosse. He raced at the newly opened third mile Wisconsin Dells Speedway on Saturday nights. By the end of the year, Trickle had won 58 feature events.

Trickle started his 1972 season by winning at Golden Sands Speedway near Wisconsin Rapids. Wisconsin's short track racing season starts in April. By May 13, he had twelve wins in thirteen events. He got this fifteenth win in twenty starts on May 27. Trickle became the winningest short track driver that year when he won his 67th race.

Trickle won numerous special events outside of Wisconsin in 1973, including a 200-lap feature at Rolla, Missouri in April, followed by winning a fifty-lap feature the following day at I-70 Speedway near Odessa, Missouri. In May he won a 50-lapper at Springfield, Missouri and two more features at I-70 Speedway. Trickle used his purple 1970 Ford Mustang to win at the Minnesota Fair and at Rockford Speedway in September. He had a total of 57 wins in 1973.

Sanctioning bodies put in a weight-per-cubic-inch rule, and Trickle's career had problems in 1974 and 1975. "Fords almost broke me. I couldn't get any pieces for racing at my level. It took two years of hard labor and depleting my funds to realize I couldn't do this anymore. I told myself either I had to change my program or get out of racing." Therefore, Trickle decided to use a General Motors car and engine. He bought a car for $13,000 on his word that he would pay for it by September. He won 35 or 40 races that year and paid for the car by July.

In 1982, Trickle won track championship at State Park Speedway in Wausau where he started out the season by winning the first two features and seven total. He also won the track championship at La Crosse Fairgrounds Speedway after winning three events in August. That season he won his first Miller 200 special event at the Milwaukee Mile. Trickle started racing out of state a lot more in 1983. Of all of Trickle's victories, his best memory was winning the 1983 World Crown 300 in Georgia. "It took three weeks of preparation and a lot of determination," he said. "It was the biggest payday of my career up to that point ($50,000)." He beat Jim Sauter by two car-lengths at the season opener, and won three straight races in May. After winning on June 1, LaCrosse business raised a $700 bounty for anyone who could beat him. Trickle skipped the following week, and returned the week after to lose to Steve Burgess. For the 1983 ARTGO Dixieland Challenge at Kaukauna, he was required to start last in the feature, but still won handily. He did not win as much at State Park, but he did win the track championship. Trickle won ASA races at Coeburn, Virginia and Cayuga, Ontario in 1984, as well as the Red, White, and Blue state championship series at WIR and the Slinger Nationals at Slinger.

=== Regional and national touring career ===
Trickle raced in United States Automobile Club (USAC) stock cars in 1968, and he won the series' rookie of the year award.

==== NASCAR career ====
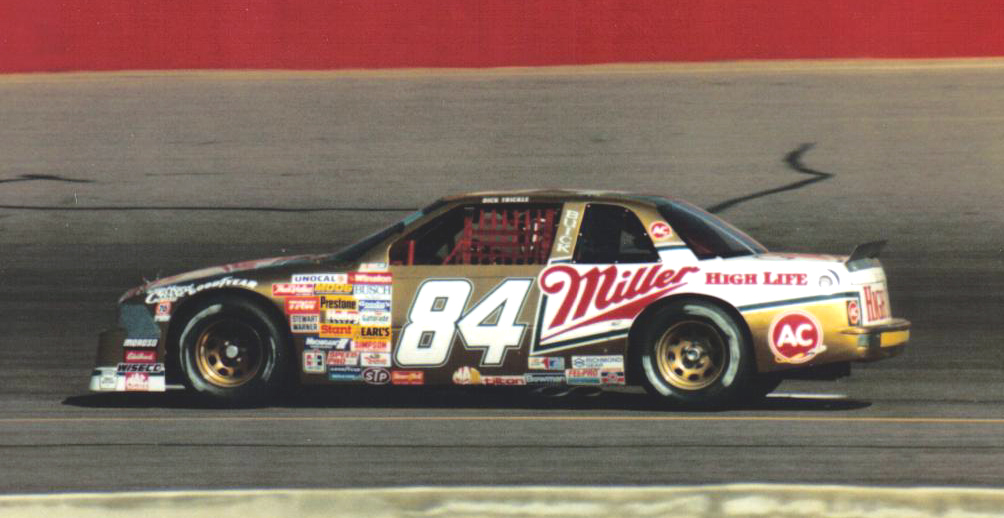
1989 rookie of the year car

Through the 1970s and 1980s, Trickle made sporadic appearances in the NASCAR Winston Cup Series, including three Daytona 500 starts. Invited by Bill France Sr. himself to join the series in the middle of his prospering short-track career, he quipped that he "didn't want to take the pay cut."

In 1989, Trickle made his full schedule debut driving the No. 84 Miller High Life Buick for Stavola Brothers Racing replacing the injured Mike Alexander. He was rookie of the year in NASCAR's Winston Cup Series at the age of 48 (and a grandfather), becoming the oldest driver in Winston Cup history to do so. After being given the rookie of the year trophy at the NASCAR awards banquet, he quipped "I guess I'd just like to thank everyone who gave a young guy like me a chance". His best career Winston Cup finish was third (five times). He started 303 races, with 15 top five and 36 top ten finishes.

In 1990, he won the Winston Open (the qualifying race to fill out the field of The Winston, which is now the NASCAR All-Star Race) in the No. 66 TropArtic Pontiac. The Open was a non-points event for drivers who did not win in the previous year. He beat Rob Moroso by 8 inches, the smallest margin of victory at the event. He also won his only career Cup pole, at Dover Downs International Speedway. He competed in the 1990 NASCAR Christmas 400 at the Calder Park Thunderdome in Australia, winning the pole but finishing 25th due to transmission issues 81 laps into the race. In the middle of the 1991 season, he went to drive the No. 24 Team III Racing Pontiac. His best finish was sixth at Dover International Speedway. In 1992, he teamed up once again with the Stavola Brothers, driving the No. 8 Snickers Ford. In 1993, he drove the No. 75 Carolina Pottery Ford for Butch Mock Motorsports and then the No. 41 Manheim Auctions Chevy for Larry Hedrick Motorsports.

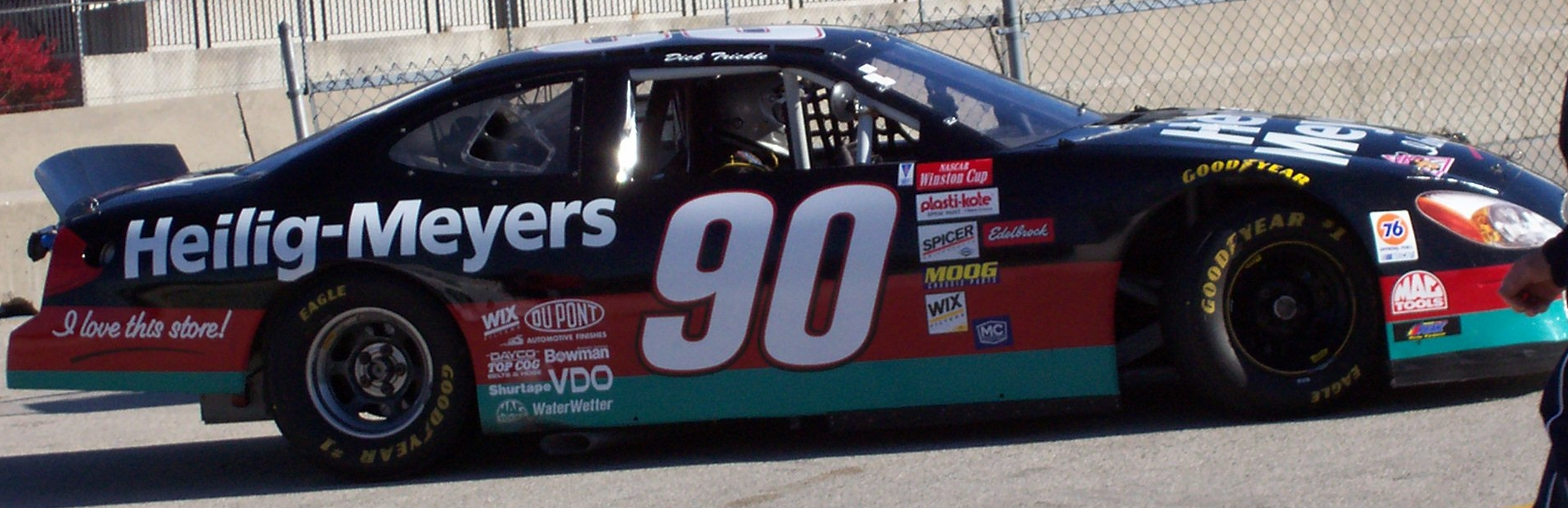
Heilig Meyers' car

Part of his popularity stemmed from his unusual, double-entendre name. ESPN's Dan Patrick and Keith Olbermann often made it a point to mention where he finished whenever NASCAR highlights were featured on SportsCenter. He was also widely noted for having drilled a hole in his safety helmet so that he could smoke while racing, and for installing cigarette lighters in his race cars. Trickle was allowed by NASCAR to smoke in the race car during yellow flag periods, and in the 1990 Winston 500 (now the Aaron's 499), Trickle was seen on live television by the in-car camera lighting up and smoking a cigarette.

Trickle even made fun of his lack of success in NASCAR's top-level series in a 1997 TV commercial for NAPA Auto Parts. In it, Trickle announces a contest where fans can win $100,000 if they pick the winner of that year's NAPA 500 race. "A little tip...it's gonna be me," he says, as an on-screen graphic points out "Dick is 0 for 243 in Cup races". "I think we get champagne (after winning)," says Trickle.

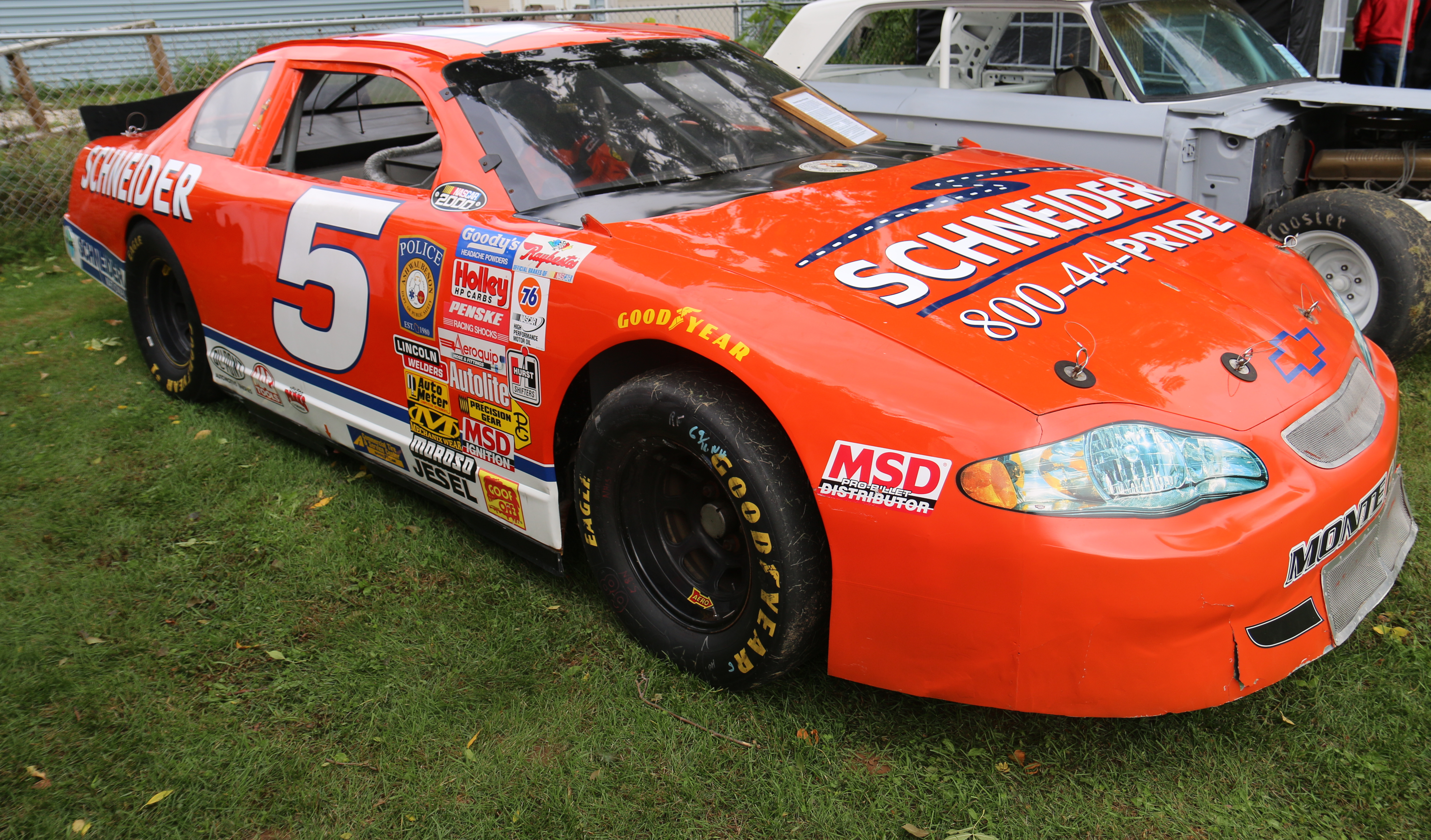
2000 NASCAR Busch Grand National car

Trickle also raced in the Busch Series, where he won two races. He had 158 career starts, with 24 top-five and 42 top-ten finishes. He made his Busch Series debut in 1984. In 1991 he scored a win in the ARCA series at Atlanta Motor Speedway.

Through the 2000s, Trickle continued to race in occasional events in Wisconsin, including the 2001 and 2007, Slinger Nationals at Slinger Super Speedway and in the ASA Midwest Tour.

== Legacy ==
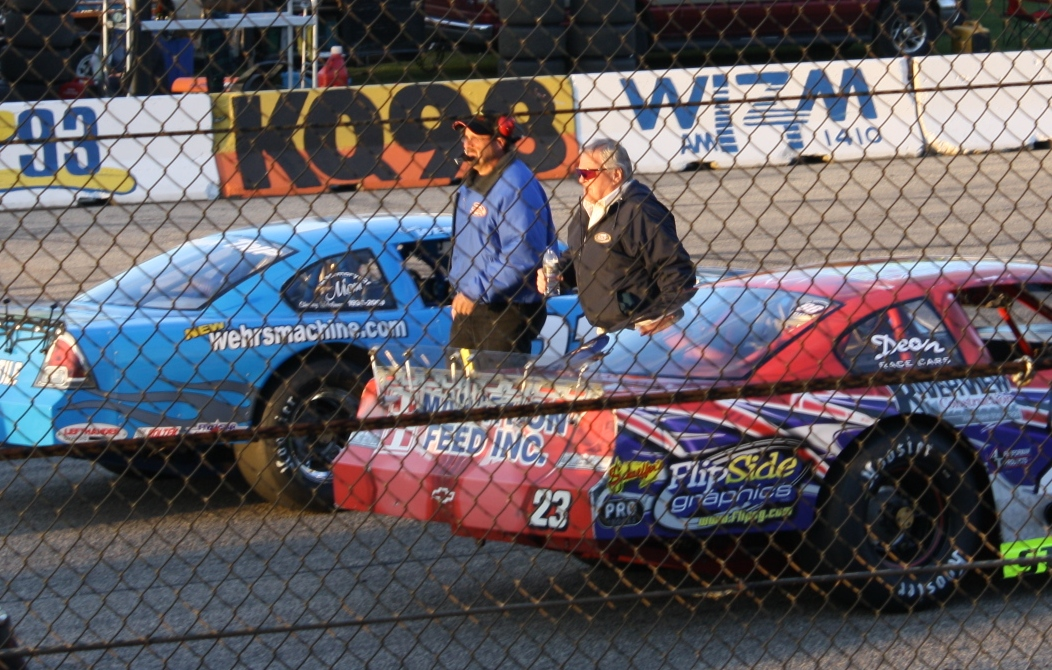
Trickle (right) at the 2009 Dick Trickle 99

The La Crosse Fairgrounds Speedway created the Dick Trickle 99 race, a 99 lap super late model event held during its annual Oktoberfest race weekend. Wisconsin International Raceway has named a building in turn two the "Dick Trickle Pavilion". Trickle served as the de facto grand marshal of the Slinger Nationals after he retired until his death.

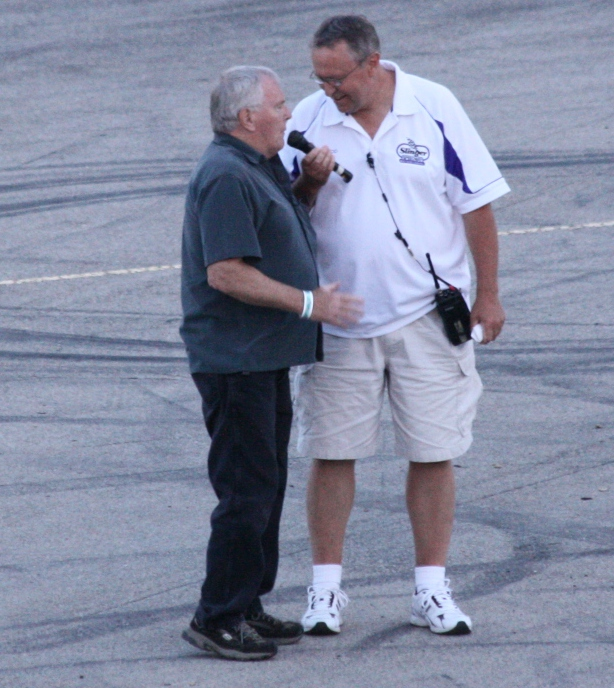
Trickle at 2012 Slinger Nationals race

Trickle's crashes at the Lake Placid bobsleigh, luge, and skeleton track at the Geoff Bodine Bobsled Challenge (in which NASCAR and NHRA drivers raised funds for the Bo-Dyn Bobsled Project, owned by Bodine, to build sleds for the United States Olympic bobsled team) resulted in that turn (17, 18, 19, the "heart curve") being named the "Trickle Turn."

The main character of the 1990 NASCAR feature film Days of Thunder played by Tom Cruise is named Cole Trickle as a homage to Dick.

== Death ==
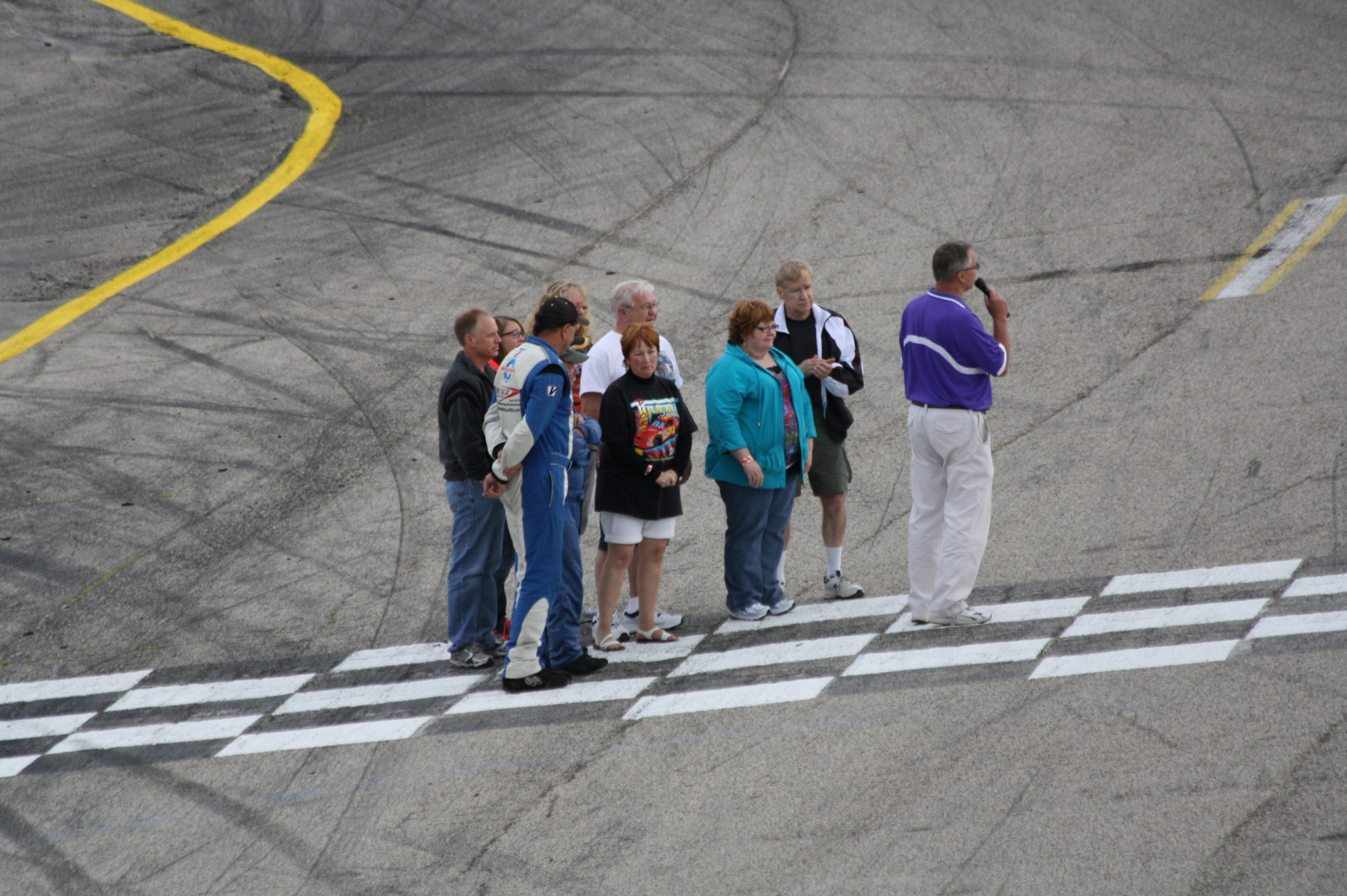
Trickle's family and Rich Bickle giving tribute at the 2013 Slinger Nationals

Trickle died May 16, 2013, from an apparent self-inflicted gunshot wound. The incident occurred at 12:02 pm at Forest Lawn Cemetery in Boger City, North Carolina. The Lincoln County Communications Center received a call, apparently from Trickle, saying that "there's going to be a dead body. Suicide." When the 911 operator asked who was about to commit suicide, Trickle responded: "I'm the one." Police attempted to call his phone back, but there was no response. Trickle was found dead beside his pickup truck. His granddaughter, who died in a 2001 car accident, is buried in the same cemetery.

Trickle's family later released a statement which in part said: "He had been suffering for some time with severe chronic pain, had seen many doctors, none of which could find the source of his pain. His family as well as all those who knew him find his death very hard to accept, and though we will hurt from losing him for some time, he's no longer suffering and we take comfort knowing he's with his very special angel."

NASCAR chairman Brian France released a statement saying "Dick was a legend in the short track racing community, particularly in his home state of Wisconsin, and he was a true fan favorite. Personalities like Dick Trickle helped shape our sport. He will be missed." Former competitor Rusty Wallace battled Trickle for championships at several levels. "I'm in 100 percent shock. Dick Trickle was my mentor," Wallace said. "When I was short track racing, I would call him every Monday morning and he would always help me with race setups and stuff. He and I had such a good time telling little stories, but he was the guy that taught me almost everything in the American Speed Association. And he was the guy that I battled right to the end for my 1983 ASA championship. I barely beat the guy that taught me everything. I'd not seen Dick as much as I'd like to of late. He was a legend. A man that'd won over a thousand short track races, was one of the most winning short trackers in America, was a role model to many short track racers coming up. Could just do magic with the race car and he taught me so much about racing. My success in the ASA and what Trickle taught me is what got me into NASCAR. That's what got me hired by Cliff Stewart back in '84. Between Larry Phillips and Dick Trickle, they taught me everything."

A moment of silence was observed for Trickle during the start of the North Carolina Education Lottery 200 at Charlotte Motor Speedway on May 17. A tribute was held for Trickle at the July 2013 Slinger Nationals race with his family telling stories about his career.

== Legacy and memorial ==
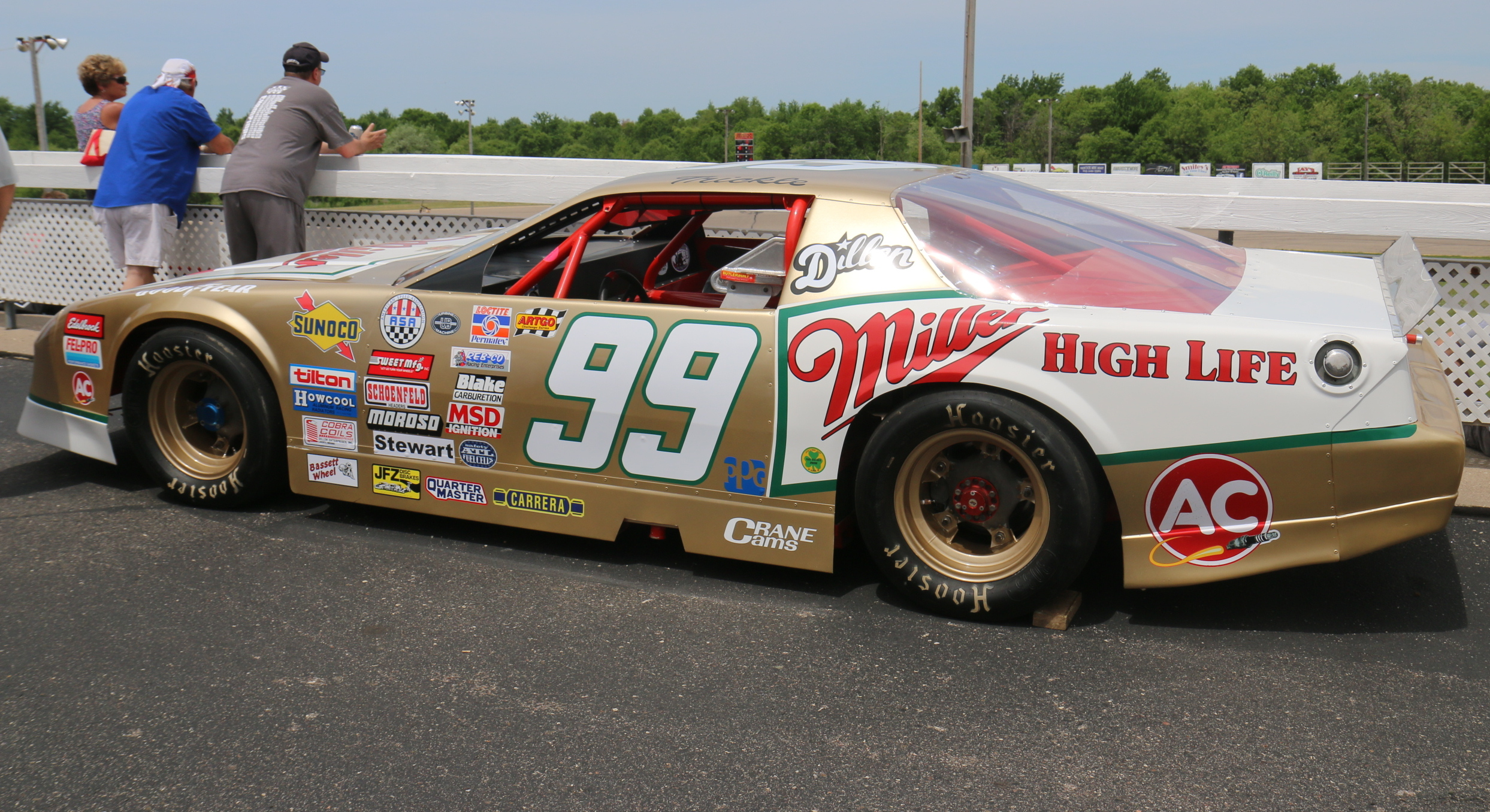
Trickle's ASA car on display at Golden Sands Speedway's 2018 Dick Trickle Memorial race

Trickle's Wisconsin friends and competitors, including Tom Reffner and Marv Marzofka, began organizing a Dick Trickle memorial fund to build a memorial statue at Rudolph Community Park. The group is collecting money including securing the title sponsorship of a super late model race at Golden Sands Speedway.

Various Midwestern short tracks have Trickle Memorial races, with most being 99 laps for his car number. The most famous of the Dick Trickle Classic races is at LaCrosse Fairgrounds Speedway in Wisconsin, which was started in 2007. The Trickle Classic there consists of three 33-lap races, with scoring similar to Vermont's Milk Bowl. Winners have included Skyler Holzhausen and Johnny Sauter, both of whose fathers raced against Trickle in his career.

== Wins in major series ==
Although he won no premiership championship races, he was very successful elsewhere:

- 1 Non-championship qualifying race (Winston Open, 1990)
- 2 NASCAR Second-tier championship series race wins
- 32 American Speed Association wins
- 70 wins in NASCAR's now-defunct "Elite" Division (68 Midwest, when known as ARTGO and 2 Southwest)
- 2 USAC wins

== Motorsports career results ==
=== NASCAR ===
(key) (Bold – Pole position awarded by qualifying time. Italics – Pole position earned by points standings or practice time. * – Most laps led.)

==== Grand National Series ====
NASCAR Grand National Series results
Year	Team	No.	Make	1	2	3	4	5	6	7	8	9	10	11	12	13	14	15	16	17	18	19	20	21	22	23	24	25	26	27	28	29	30	31	32	33	34	35	36	37	38	39	40	41	42	43	44	45	46	47	48	NGNC	Pts	Ref
1970	Fran Kelly Racing	09	Ford	RSD	DAY	DAY; 17	DAY; 26	RCH	CAR	SVH	ATL	BRI	TAL	NWS	CLB	DAR	BLV	LGY	CLT	SMR	MAR	MCH	RSD	HCY	KPT	GPS	DAY	AST	TPN	TRN	BRI	SMR	NSV	ATL	CLB	ONA	MCH	TAL	BGS	SBO	DAR	HCY	RCH	DOV	NCF	NWS	CLT	MAR	MGR	CAR	LGY	114th	0	

==== Winston Cup Series ====
NASCAR Winston Cup Series results
Year	Team	No.	Make	1	2	3	4	5	6	7	8	9	10	11	12	13	14	15	16	17	18	19	20	21	22	23	24	25	26	27	28	29	30	31	32	33	34	35	36	NWCC	Pts	Ref
1973	Howard & Egerton Racing	1	Chevy	RSD	DAY	RCH	CAR	BRI	ATL	NWS	DAR	MAR	TAL	NSV	CLT	DOV	TWS	RSD	MCH	DAY	BRI	ATL	TAL	NSV	DAR	RCH	DOV	NWS	MAR	CLT; 5	CAR									81st	NA	
1974	Jack Doering Racing	81	Dodge	RSD	DAY	RCH	CAR	BRI	ATL	DAR	NWS	MAR	TAL	NSV	DOV	CLT; 7	RSD	MCH	DAY	BRI	NSV	ATL	POC	TAL	MCH	DAR	RCH	DOV	NWS	MAR										47th	24.49	
1974	Marcis Auto Racing	2	Dodge																												CLT; 8									47th	24.49	
1974	Marcis Auto Racing	2	Mercury																													CAR; 7	ONT							47th	24.49	
1975	Puro Racing	75	Mercury	RSD	DAY; 36	RCH	CAR	BRI	ATL	NWS	DAR	MAR	TAL	NSV	DOV	CLT	RSD	MCH	DAY	NSV	POC	TAL	MCH	DAR	DOV	NWS	MAR	CLT	RCH	CAR	BRI	ATL	ONT							113th	55	
1976	Donlavey Racing	99	Ford	RSD	DAY	CAR	RCH	BRI	ATL	NWS	DAR	MAR	TAL	NSV	DOV	CLT; 32	RSD	MCH	DAY	NSV	POC	TAL	MCH	BRI	DAR	RCH	DOV	MAR	NWS	CLT	CAR	ATL	ONT							105th	67	
1977	Frasson Racing	99	Chevy	RSD	DAY	RCH	CAR	ATL	NWS	DAR	BRI	MAR	TAL	NSV	DOV	CLT	RSD	MCH	DAY	NSV	POC	TAL	MCH	BRI	DAR	RCH	DOV	MAR	NWS	CLT; 29	CAR	ATL	ONT							99th	76	
1978	Puro Racing	99	Ford	RSD	DAY	RCH	CAR	ATL	BRI	DAR	NWS	MAR	TAL	DOV	CLT	NSV	RSD	MCH	DAY	NSV	POC	TAL	MCH	BRI	DAR	RCH	DOV	MAR	NWS	CLT; 39	CAR	ATL	ONT							109th	46	
1984	Billy Matthews Racing	42	Chevy	DAY; 36	RCH	CAR	ATL	BRI	NWS	DAR	MAR	TAL	NSV	DOV	CLT	RSD	POC	MCH	DAY	NSV	POC	TAL	MCH	BRI	DAR	RCH	DOV	MAR	CLT	NWS	CAR	ATL	RSD							87th	55	
1985	Billy Matthews Racing	09	Chevy	DAY	RCH	CAR	ATL	BRI	DAR	NWS	MAR	TAL	DOV	CLT; 36	RSD	POC	MCH	DAY	POC	TAL								CLT; 36	CAR	ATL	RSD									58th	197	
1985	DiGard Motorsports	10	Pontiac																		MCH; 8	BRI	DAR	RCH	DOV	MAR	NWS													58th	197	
1986	Billy Matthews Racing	42	Chevy	DAY; 17	RCH	CAR	ATL	BRI	DAR	NWS	MAR	TAL	DOV	CLT; DNQ	RSD	POC	MCH	DAY	POC	TAL	GLN	MCH; DNQ	BRI	DAR	RCH	DOV	MAR	NWS	CLT	CAR; 15	ATL	RSD								55th	230	
1989	Stavola Brothers Racing	84	Buick	DAY	CAR; 13	ATL; 3	RCH; 25	DAR; 13	BRI; 5	NWS; 4	MAR; 3	TAL; 27	CLT; 29	DOV; 21	SON; 30	POC; 24	MCH; 25	DAY; 8	POC; 20	TAL; 16	GLN; 34	MCH; 19	BRI; 28	DAR; 17	RCH; 8	DOV; 25	MAR; 3	CLT; 30	NWS; 12	CAR; 5	PHO; 7	ATL; 35								15th	3203	
1990	Cale Yarborough Motorsports	66	Pontiac	DAY; 12	RCH; 5	CAR; 23	ATL; 14	DAR; 22	BRI; 13	NWS; 24	MAR; 9	TAL; 27	CLT; 12	**DOV**; 3	SON; 39	POC; 25	MCH; 24	DAY; 19	POC; 15	TAL; 36	GLN; 30	MCH; 32	BRI; 17	DAR; 11	RCH; 7	DOV; 23	MAR; 22	NWS; 29	CLT; 30	CAR; 36	PHO; 40	ATL; 37								22nd	2863	
1991	Cale Yarborough Motorsports	66	Pontiac	DAY; 11	RCH; 15	CAR; 29	ATL; 28	DAR																																35th	1258	
1991	AAG Racing	34	Buick						BRI; 30	NWS; 26	MAR; 32	TAL	CLT; 40	DOV	SON	POC	MCH	DAY																						35th	1258	
1991	Team III Racing	24	Pontiac																POC; 35	TAL; 20	GLN	MCH; 21	BRI; 27	DAR; 23	RCH	DOV; 6	MAR	NWS	CLT	CAR	PHO	ATL								35th	1258	
1992	RahMoc Enterprises	75	Olds	DAY; 5																																				20th	3097	
1992	Stavola Brothers Racing	8	Ford		CAR; 36	RCH; 22	ATL; 5	DAR; 7	BRI; 5	NWS; 11	MAR; 17	TAL; 19	CLT; 10	DOV; 9	SON; 26	POC; 29	MCH; 20	DAY; 35	POC; 9	TAL; 28	GLN; 24	MCH; 19	BRI; 23	DAR; 27	RCH; 20	DOV; 27	MAR; 6	NWS; 18	CLT; 9	CAR; 16	PHO; 40	ATL; 37								20th	3097	
1993	Butch Mock Motorsports	75	Ford	DAY; 41	CAR; 29	RCH; 21	ATL; 37	DAR; 20	BRI; 22	NWS; 33	MAR; 14	TAL; 31	SON; 20	CLT; 19	DOV; 28	POC; 36	MCH; 31	DAY; 26	NHA; 33	POC; 30	TAL; 19	GLN																		30th	2224	
1993	Roulo Brothers Racing	39	Chevy																				MCH; 39	BRI	DAR	RCH; 25														30th	2224	
1993	King Racing	26	Ford																								DOV; 25	MAR												30th	2224	
1993	Larry Hedrick Motorsports	41	Chevy																										NWS; 30	CLT; 22	CAR; 9	PHO; 31	ATL; 5							30th	2224	
1994	Active Motorsports	32	Chevy	DAY; 20	CAR; 14	RCH; 37	ATL; 28	DAR; 29	BRI; 34	NWS; 24	MAR; 32	TAL; 36	SON; DNQ	CLT; 38	DOV; 38	POC; 34	MCH; DNQ	DAY; 21	NHA; 34	POC; DNQ	TAL; DNQ	IND; DNQ	GLN; 32	MCH; 41	BRI; 17	DAR; 38	RCH; 12	DOV; 21	MAR; 32	NWS; 16	CLT; 13	CAR; 8	PHO; 39	ATL; DNQ						34th	2019	
1995	Bud Moore Engineering	15	Ford	DAY; 11	CAR; 22	RCH; 12	ATL; 22	DAR; 28	BRI; 30	NWS; 32	MAR; 24	TAL; 38	SON; 24	CLT; 16	DOV; 32	POC; 22	MCH; 16	DAY; 12	NHA; 34	POC; 10	TAL; 38	IND; 18	GLN; 28	MCH; 13	BRI; 35	DAR; 36	RCH; 18	DOV; 23	MAR; 15	NWS; 19	CLT; 32	CAR; 16	PHO; 29	ATL; 23						25th	2875	
1996	Schnell Motorsports	63	Ford	DAY; 43	CAR; DNQ																																			36th	2131	
1996	TriStar Motorsports	19	Ford			RCH; DNQ	ATL; 14	DAR; 35	BRI; 8	NWS; 22	MAR; DNQ	TAL; 19	SON; 29	CLT; 20	DOV; 28																									36th	2131	
1996	Donlavey Racing	90	Ford													POC; 26	MCH; 39	DAY; 28	NHA; 27	POC; 18	TAL; 38	IND; 23	GLN; 39	MCH; 38	BRI; 26	DAR; 36	RCH; 27	DOV; 23	MAR; 13	NWS; DNQ	CLT; 35	CAR; 31	PHO; 20	ATL; DNQ						36th	2131	
1997	Donlavey Racing	90	Ford	DAY; 30	CAR; 19	RCH; 29	ATL; 28	DAR; DNQ	TEX; 23	BRI; 11	MAR; 30	SON; DNQ	TAL; 15	CLT; 33	DOV; 41	POC; 26	MCH; 23	CAL; 22	DAY; 25	NHA; 25	POC; 19	IND; DNQ	GLN	MCH; 39	BRI; 3	DAR; 13	RCH; 19	NHA; 22	DOV; 18	MAR; 42	CLT; 14	TAL; 23	CAR; 5	PHO; 40	ATL; 14					31st	2629	
1998	Donlavey Racing	90	Ford	DAY; 27	CAR; 37	LVS; 16	ATL; 6	DAR; 24	BRI; 13	TEX; 22	MAR; 37	TAL; 20	CAL; 37	CLT; 21	DOV; 21	RCH; 17	MCH; 24	POC; 27	SON; 33	NHA; 17	POC; 29	IND; 18	GLN; 41	MCH; 38	BRI; 43	NHA; 19	DAR; 33	RCH; 42	DOV; 31	MAR; 33	CLT; 33	TAL; 38	DAY; DNQ	PHO; 19	CAR; 23	ATL; 12				29th	2678	
1999	Elliott-Marino Racing	13	Ford	DAY; DNQ	CAR	LVS	ATL																																	47th	528	
1999	LJ Racing	91	Chevy					DAR; 26	TEX; DNQ	BRI; 31	MAR; 31	TAL; DNQ	CAL	RCH; 32	CLT; DNQ	DOV; 43	MCH	POC; 40	SON	DAY	NHA; 29	POC	IND; DNQ	GLN		BRI; DNQ	DAR													47th	528	
1999	MB2 Motorsports	36	Pontiac																						MCH; 40															47th	528	
1999	Rudd Performance Motorsports	10	Ford																									RCH; QL^{†}												47th	528	
1999	Larry Hedrick Motorsports	41	Chevy																										NHA; DNQ	DOV; DNQ	MAR; DNQ	CLT; 41	TAL	CAR	PHO	HOM	ATL			47th	528	
2000	A. J. Foyt Enterprises	14	Pontiac	DAY	CAR	LVS	ATL	DAR; 31	BRI; 27																															51st	423	
2000	Joe Bessey Motorsports	60	Chevy							TEX; 28	MAR	TAL; 39	CAL; 37	RCH	CLT	DOV	MCH	POC	SON	DAY	NHA	POC	IND	GLN	MCH	BRI	DAR	RCH	NHA	DOV	MAR	CLT; 23	TAL	CAR	PHO	HOM				51st	423	
2000	Marcis Auto Racing	71	Chevy																																		ATL; DNQ			51st	423	
2001	Marcis Auto Racing	71	Chevy	DAY	CAR	LVS	ATL	DAR	BRI	TEX	MAR	TAL	CAL	RCH	CLT	DOV	MCH	POC	SON	DAY	CHI	NHA	POC	IND	GLN	MCH	BRI	DAR	RCH	DOV	KAN	CLT	MAR; QL^{‡}	TAL	PHO	CAR; 33	HOM	ATL	NHA	65th	64	
2002	Marcis Auto Racing	71	Chevy	DAY	CAR; DNQ	LVS	ATL; 42	DAR	BRI; 42	TEX	MAR					DOV; 42	POC	MCH	SON	DAY	CHI	NHA	POC	IND	GLN	MCH	BRI	DAR	RCH	NHA	DOV	KAN	TAL	CLT	MAR	ATL	CAR	PHO	HOM	66th	111	
2002	Evernham Motorsports	91	Dodge									TAL; DNQ	CAL	RCH	CLT																									66th	111	
^{†} - Qualified for Ricky Rudd · ^{‡} - Qualified for Dave Marcis

===== Daytona 500 =====
Year	Team	Manufacturer	Start	Finish
1970	Fran Kelly Racing	Ford	36	26
1975	Puro Racing	Mercury	27	36
1984	Billy Matthews Racing	Chevrolet	21	36
1986	Billy Matthews Racing	Chevrolet	28	17
1990	Cale Yarborough Motorsports	Pontiac	32	12
1991	Cale Yarborough Motorsports	Pontiac	28	11
1992	RahMoc Enterprises	Oldsmobile	28	5
1993	Butch Mock Motorsports	Ford	21	41
1994	Active Motorsports	Chevrolet	29	20
1995	Bud Moore Engineering	Ford	17	11
1996	Schnell Motorsports	Ford	28	43
1997	Donlavey Racing	Ford	27	30
1998	Donlavey Racing	Ford	34	27
1999	Elliott-Marino Racing	Ford	DNQ	

==== Busch Series ====
NASCAR Busch Series results
Year	Team	No.	Make	1	2	3	4	5	6	7	8	9	10	11	12	13	14	15	16	17	18	19	20	21	22	23	24	25	26	27	28	29	30	31	32	33	NBGNC	Pts	Ref
1984	Hendrick Motorsports	15	Pontiac	DAY	RCH	CAR	HCY	MAR	DAR	ROU	NSV	LGY	**MLW**; 3	DOV	CLT	SBO	HCY	ROU	SBO	ROU	HCY	IRP	LGY	SBO	BRI	DAR	RCH	NWS	CLT	HCY	CAR	MAR					69th	185	
1990	Mac Martin Motorsports	92	Pontiac	DAY; 23	RCH	CAR	MAR	HCY	DAR	BRI	LAN	SBO	NZH	HCY	**CLT**; 2^{*}																						62nd	264	
1990	Pharo Racing	33	Olds													DOV; 7	ROU	VOL	MYB	OXF	NHA	SBO	DUB	IRP	ROU	BRI	DAR	RCH	DOV	MAR	CLT	NHA	CAR	MAR			62nd	264	
1991	Mac Martin Motorsports	92	Chevy	DAY; 42	RCH	CAR	MAR	VOL	HCY	DAR	BRI	LAN	SBO	NZH	CLT; 2	DOV	ROU	HCY	MYB	GLN	OXF	NHA	SBO	DUB													37th	1050	
1991	Mac Martin Motorsports	92	Olds																						IRP; 3	ROU	BRI; 19										37th	1050	
1991	Highline Racing	18	Pontiac																									DAR; 4	RCH; 23	DOV; 4	CLT; DNQ	NHA	CAR; 28	MAR; 28			37th	1050	
1992	Highline Racing	2	Pontiac	DAY	CAR	RCH	ATL	MAR	DAR; 4	BRI; 25	HCY	LAN	DUB	NZH	CLT; 8	DOV	ROU	MYB	GLN	VOL	NHA	TAL	IRP	ROU	MCH	NHA	BRI	DAR	RCH	DOV	CLT	MAR	CAR	HCY			56th	390	
1994	Shoemaker Racing	64	Chevy	DAY	CAR	RCH	ATL	MAR	DAR	HCY	BRI	ROU	NHA	NZH	CLT	DOV	MYB	GLN	MLW	SBO	TAL	HCY	IRP	MCH; 5	BRI; 5	DAR	RCH	DOV; 14	CLT; DNQ		CAR; 40						53rd	532	
1994	Petty Enterprises	43	Pontiac																											MAR; 35							53rd	532	
1996	Shoemaker Racing	64	Chevy	DAY	CAR	RCH	**ATL**; 13	NSV; 8	DAR; 9	BRI; 8	HCY; 27	NZH; 4	CLT; 2	DOV; 40	SBO; 14	MYB; 7	GLN; 12	MLW; 15	NHA; 12	TAL; 7	IRP; 8	MCH; 37	BRI; 23	DAR; 3	RCH; 5	DOV; 30	CLT; 25	CAR; 16	HOM; 35								12th	2728	
1997	Shoemaker Racing	64	Chevy	DAY; 19	CAR; 11	RCH; 32	ATL; 18	LVS; 2	DAR; 3	HCY; 1	TEX; 16	BRI; 5	NSV; 15	TAL; 10	NHA	NZH; 27	CLT; 11	**DOV**; 37	SBO; 17	GLN; 30	MLW; 14	MYB	GTY; 21	IRP; 27	MCH; 42	BRI; 15	DAR; 3	RCH; 4	**DOV**; 38	CLT; 39	CAL; 25	CAR; 2	HOM; 41				14th	3074	
1998	Shoemaker Racing	64	Chevy	DAY; 23	CAR; 11	LVS; 22	NSV; 9	DAR; 3	BRI; 13	TEX; DNQ	HCY; 11	TAL; 5^{*}	NHA; 13	NZH; 12	CLT; 20	DOV; 12	RCH; 8	PPR	GLN	MLW; 41	MYB	CAL; 39	SBO	IRP	MCH; 11	BRI; 39	DAR; 1	RCH; 8	DOV; 42	CLT; 34	GTY	CAR	**ATL**; 38	HOM; 43			22nd	2441	
1999	Spencer Motor Ventures	5	Chevy	DAY; 26	CAR; DNQ	LVS; 31	ATL; 31	DAR; 37	TEX; DNQ	NSV; 42	BRI; 21	TAL; 11	CAL; 26	NHA; 11	RCH; 11	NZH; 13	CLT; 31	**DOV**; 5	SBO; 21^{*}	GLN; 20	MLW; 9	MYB; 17	PPR; 6	GTY; 16	IRP; 14	MCH; 29	BRI; 17	DAR; 21	RCH; 12	DOV; 12	CLT; 16	CAR; 19	MEM; 6	PHO; 24	HOM; 35		11th	3154	
2000	Spencer Motor Ventures	5	Chevy	DAY; 16	CAR; 41	LVS; 29	ATL; 8	DAR; 32	BRI; 10	TEX; 12	NSV; 33	TAL; 37	CAL; 13	RCH; 23	NHA; 30	CLT; 37	DOV; 17	SBO; 39	MYB; 26	GLN; 40	MLW; 19	NZH; 35	PPR; 14	GTY; 16	IRP; 25	MCH; 15	BRI; 35	DAR; 33	RCH; 7	DOV; 20	CLT; 34	CAR; 40	MEM; 25	PHO; 23	HOM; 23		22nd	2808	
2001	Jay Robinson Racing	49	Ford	DAY	CAR	LVS	ATL	DAR	BRI	TEX	NSH	TAL	CAL	RCH	NHA	NZH	CLT	DOV	KEN; 38	MLW	GLN	CHI	GTY	PPR	IRP	MCH	BRI	DAR	RCH	DOV	KAN	CLT	MEM	PHO	CAR	HOM	132nd	49	

== Bibliography ==
Notes

References

- Grubba, Dale (2000). The Golden Age of Wisconsin Auto Racing (2000 ed.). Oregon, Wisconsin: Badger Books. ISBN 1878569678.

Sporting positions
Preceded by Rusty Wallace	ASA National Tour Champion; 1984, 1985	Succeeded by Mark Martin
Preceded by Dave Watson	ARTGO Challenge Series Champion; 1977	Succeeded by Tom Reffner
Preceded by Tom Reffner	ARTGO Challenge Series Champion; 1979, 1980	Succeeded by Jim Sauter
Preceded by Jim Sauter	ARTGO Challenge Series Champion; 1983, 1984, 1985	Succeeded by Joe Shear
Preceded by Joe Shear	ARTGO Challenge Series Champion; 1987	Succeeded by Joe Shear
Awards and achievements
Preceded by Ken Bouchard	NASCAR Winston Cup Series Rookie of the Year; 1989	Succeeded by Rob Moroso
