= Booger (disambiguation) =

A booger is a dried nasal mucus, typically extracted by nose picking.

Booger or boogers may also refer to:

== People ==
- Booger McFarland (born 1977), American football player
- Marco Boogers (born 1967), Dutch footballer
- Quincy Boogers (born 1995), Dutch footballer
- Johann Lucas Boër (1751–1835), German physician born Johann Lucas Boogers
- Mike Shaw (1957–2010), American professional wrestler known by his ring name "Bastion Booger"
- Ed Smith (streetball player) (born c. 1973, professional career 1997–2000), American streetball player nicknamed "Booger"

== Film and television ==
- Dudley "Booger" Dawson, in the Revenge of the Nerds film series launched in 1984
- Booger, in the Mixels (2014–2016) television series
- Booger (film), a 2023 body horror film

== See also ==
- Bogeyman, a mythical evil creature, ghost or hobgoblin; also boogerman, or boogieman
- Booger dance, a Cherokee dance performed with ritual masks
- Boogertown, North Carolina, U.S.
