= Boger–Hartsell Farm =

Historic farm in North Carolina, United States

- U.S. National Register of Historic Places
- Location within North Carolina Location within the United States
- Location: Jct. of US-801 and NC1148, near Concord, North Carolina
- Coordinates: 35°18′53″N 80°31′0″W
- Area: 8.5 acres (3.4 ha)
- Built: c. 1872, c. 1882
- Built by: A.H. Propst, Hartsell, McDonald, et al.
- Architectural style: Italianate, log barn and corn crib
- NRHP reference No.: 98000890
- Added to NRHP: July 23, 1998

Boger–Hartsell Farm is a historic home and farm located near Concord, Cabarrus County, North Carolina. The farmhouse was built in 1882, and is a one-story, L-shaped dwelling with Italianate and Greek Revival style design elements. Also on the property are the contributing log barn (c. 1872), a log corncrib (c. 1885), a well house and canopy (c. 1885), a granary (c. 1913), a smokehouse (c. 1939), a hen house (c. 1937), and a washhouse (c. 1940).

It was listed on the National Register of Historic Places in 1998.
