= Bogger =

Bogger may refer to:

- LHD (load, haul, dump machine), an articulated mining vehicle
- A vehicle used in mud bogging, an off-road sport
- Bogger Mushanga (born 1952), Zambian triple jumper
