= Constant viscosity elastic fluid =

Elastic fluids

Constant viscosity elastic liquids, also known as Boger fluids are elastic fluids with constant viscosity. This creates an effect in the fluid where it flows like a liquid, yet behaves like an elastic solid when stretched out. Most elastic fluids exhibit shear thinning (viscosity decreases as shear strain is applied), because they are solutions containing polymers. But Boger fluids are exceptions since they are highly dilute solutions, so dilute that shear thinning caused by the polymers can be ignored. Boger fluids are made primarily by adding a small amount of polymer to a Newtonian fluid with a high viscosity, a typical solution being polyacrylamide mixed with corn syrup. It is a simple compound to synthesize but important to the study of rheology because elastic effects and shear effects can be clearly distinguished in experiments using Boger fluids. Without Boger fluids, it was difficult to determine if a non-Newtonian effect was caused by elasticity, shear thinning, or both; non-Newtonian flow caused by elasticity was rarely identifiable. Since Boger fluids can have constant viscosity, an experiment can be done where the results of the flow rates of a Boger liquid and a Newtonian liquid with the same viscosity can be compared, and the difference in the flow rates would show the change caused by the elasticity of the Boger liquid.

== Research ==
=== Original Boger fluid ===
Boger fluids are named after David V. Boger, who in the late 1970s was the primary researcher pushing for the study of constant viscosity elastic liquids. He released his first paper on Boger fluids in 1977, titled "A Highly Elastic Constant-Viscosity Fluid", where he described the ideal fluid for experimentation as a fluid that is "highly viscous and highly elastic at room temperature and at the same time is optically clear". The main purpose of the paper was to experiment on the highly viscous and highly elastic fluid and record the fundamental rheometric properties of the fluid. Such a fluid would allow for experimentation under conditions not affected by inertia and shear thinning effects, and influence of inertia would easily be distinguishable.

He began his research using maltose syrups (corn syrups) mixed with a small amount of water. He then tested shear stress versus shear rate of the solution to prove that the solution was a Newtonian fluid. This was done by using a R16 Weissenberg rheogoniometer (a rheogoniometer calibrated to measure specifically the behavior of a viscoelastic polymer solution) for the low range shear stress rates, and the high rates were measured using a capillary rheometer, a device used to measure shear stress rates under high stress. The data proved that there was a linear relationship between shear stress and shear rate with the slope being very close to one, meaning the maltose syrup was indeed a Newtonian fluid. Once 0.08% of the polymer polyacrylamide was added, the flow properties drastically changed. Elastic properties were introduced to the fluid while only a slight amount of shear thinning was observed, small enough to be ignored. The syrup solution had properties very similar to a polymer melt, but there was no shear thinning and the materials could be produced at room temperature.

=== Subsequent Boger fluids ===
The original Boger fluid was an aqueous solution, as were all the solutions synthesized until 1983, when organic Boger fluids were produced using a dilute solution of polyisobutylene (PIB) in a mixture of polybutene (PB) with a small quantity of kerosene oil added. From then on, most Boger fluids have been PIB - PB solutions. Other recipes include:

- polystyrene in oligomeric glycol (Solomon and Muller 1996)
- polyethylene oxide in polyethylene glycol (Dontula et al. 2004)
- polystyrene in dioctyl phthalate (Odell & Carrington 2006)

== Commercial use ==
=== Waste disposal ===
The best application so far for Boger fluids is solving the problem of disposal for the waste produced in the processing of bauxite to alumina for use in producing aluminium, and there is normally two or three times more "red mud" produced than alumina. Normally, the waste, known as "red mud", was disposed of by being flushed down dams with millions of liters of water. The dams continue to hold the "red mud", because it does not work as a building foundation and also can't be used as farm land. Companies needed to find a way to efficiently dispose of it all onto the dams without clogging the tubes it was being transferred in. With the development of Boger fluids, aluminum giant Alcoa developed a way to convert the waste into a thick matter that could still flow down pipes. Using this method, the dangers of tubes erupting was cut out, leading to a more sustainable practice.
