= Ernest Boger =

First African-American to attend the University of South Florida

- Education: Blake High School; University of South Florida; University of North Texas

Ernest Boger was the first African-American to attend the University of South Florida in 1961, a year after the school (established for whites only) opened.

Boger was the valedictorian of Blake High School in Tampa, Florida and achieved a score of 492 out of a possible 495 on his college entrance exam. In the fall of 1961, he became the first African-American student at USF. While at school, Boger and a group of white friends were attacked by a mob. Boger graduated in 1965 with a degree in psychology, with minors in Russian and music. He later earned an MBA from the University of North Texas and Doctor of Management degree from the International Management Centres Association (IMCA), of Buckingham, England.

He became a professor. He was interviewed in 2003.
