= David Boger =

Australian chemical engineer (1939–2025)

David Boger AC FRS FAA
- Born: David Vernon Boger; 13 November 1939; Kutztown, Pennsylvania, U.S.
- Died: 5 July 2025 (aged 85); Melbourne, Victoria, Australia
- Occupation: Chemical engineer

David Vernon Boger AC FRS FAA (13 November 1939 – 5 July 2025) was an Australian chemical engineer.

== Life and career ==
Boger graduated from Bucknell University with a B.S. where he studied with Robert Slonaker, and from University of Illinois with an M.S. and Ph.D.

He taught at Monash University, the University of Melbourne, and the University of Florida. He was one of three inaugural Laureate Professors at the University of Melbourne.

Boger died on 5 July 2025, at the age of 85.

== Work ==
Boger is known for his studies of non-Newtonian fluids (which behave both as liquids and solids) which have improved the understanding of how this group of fluids flow and led to major financial and environmental benefits. Boger discovered 'perfect' non-Newtonian fluids, which are elastic and have constant viscosity and are now known as Boger fluids, which enabled him to explain how non-Newtonian fluids behave. He was able to apply his ideas to improve the disposal of "red mud", a toxic waste produced during the manufacture of aluminium from bauxite and a major environmental problem. His findings also led to improved inks for industrial inkjet printers, insecticide chemicals that spread evenly on leaves and reduced drag in oil pipelines.

== Honours and awards ==
Boger was elected to the Fellowship of the Australian Academy of Science in 1993 and served on the Council of the Australian Academy of Science from 1999 to 2002. He was awarded the Matthew Flinders Medal and Lecture in 2000. In 2007 he was elected Fellow of the Royal Society and of the Royal Society of Victoria. In 2017, Boger was elected a member of the National Academy of Engineering for discoveries and fundamental research on elastic and particulate fluids and their application to waste minimisation in the minerals industry.

- 2005 Prime Minister's Prize for Science
- 2000 Matthew Flinders Medal and Lecture by the Australian Academy of Science
- 2017 Elected to the US National Academy of Engineering
- 2024 Appointed Companion of the Order of Australia
