= Quincy Boogers =

Dutch football player (born 1995)

Personal information
- Date of birth: 28 December 1995 (age 30)
- Place of birth: Dordrecht, Netherlands
- Height: 1.89 m (6 ft 2 1/2 in)
- Position: Midfielder

Youth career
- Dordrecht

Senior career*
Years	Team	Apps	(Gls)
2015–2017	Dordrecht	23	(0)
- * Club domestic league appearances and goals as of 27 May 2017

Quincy Boogers (born 28 December 1995) is a Dutch retired football player who last played for FC Dordrecht. He is a son of former player Marco Boogers.

== Club career ==
He made his professional debut in the Eredivisie for FC Dordrecht on 17 May 2015 in a game against Ajax.
