= Boger City, North Carolina =

- Neighborhood
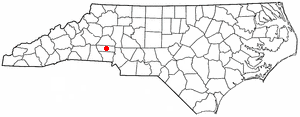
- Location of Boger City, North Carolina
- Coordinates: 35°28′50″N 81°12′48″W
- Country: United States
- State: North Carolina
- County: Lincoln
- City: Lincolnton
- Annexed: 1986
- Named after: Robert Boger

Area
  - Total: 0.69 sq mi (1.8 km^{2})
  - Land: 0.69 sq mi (1.8 km^{2})
  - Water: 0 sq mi (0.0 km^{2})
- Elevation: 984 ft (300 m)

Population (2000)
  - Total: 554
  - Density: 785/sq mi (302.9/km^{2})
- Time zone: UTC-5 (Eastern (EST))
  - Summer (DST): UTC-4 (EDT)
- ZIP code: 28092
- Area code: 704
- FIPS code: 37-06720
- GNIS feature ID: 1023370

Boger City is a neighborhood of the city of Lincolnton in Lincoln County, North Carolina, United States. The population was 554 at the 2000 census, at which time it was erroneously listed as a census-designated place.

Boger City was an independent town before 1986, when it was annexed by Lincolnton.

== Geography ==
According to the United States Census Bureau, the Boger City CDP had a total area of 0.7 square miles (1.8 km^{2}), all land.

== Demographics ==
As of the census of 2000, there were 554 people, 227 households, and 152 families residing in the CDP. The population density was 784.5 inhabitants per square mile (302.9/km^{2}). There were 234 housing units at an average density of 331.4 per square mile (128.0/km^{2}). The racial makeup of the CDP was 91.34% White, 7.25% African American, 0.18% Native American, 0.18% Pacific Islander, 4.33% from other races, and 0.72% from two or more races. Hispanic or Latino of any race were 2.16% of the population.

There were 227 households, out of which 33.5% had children under the age of 18 living with them, 51.1% were married couples living together, 9.3% had a female householder with no husband present, and 32.6% were non-families. 27.8% of all households were made up of individuals, and 12.3% had someone living alone who was 65 years of age or older. The average household size was 2.44 and the average family size was 2.95.

In the CDP the population was spread out, with 24.4% under the age of 18, 9.2% from 18 to 24, 29.8% from 25 to 44, 23.5% from 45 to 64, and 13.2% who were 65 years of age or older. The median age was 38 years. For every 100 females, there were 102.2 males. For every 100 females age 18 and over, there were 92.2 males.

The median income for a household in the CDP was $34,286, and the median income for a family was $43,542. Males had a median income of $31,917 versus $16,989 for females. The per capita income for the CDP was $17,432. About 12.7% of families and 12.5% of the population were below the poverty line, including 17.5% of those under age 18 and 11.1% of those age 65 or over.
