= List of driver deaths in motorsport =

Tracks with the most driver deaths
(Germany) Nürburgring	70 (list)
(United States) Indianapolis	57 (list)
(United Kingdom) Brands Hatch	37 (list)
(United Kingdom) Silverstone	35
(Italy) Monza	30 (list)
(France) Le Mans	27 (list (24H))
(Belgium) Spa-Francorchamps	26 (list)
(United Kingdom) Oulton Park	26
(United States) Daytona	25 (list)

Many people, including drivers, crew members, officials and spectators, have been killed in crashes related to the sport of auto racing, in races, in qualifying, in practice or in private testing sessions. Deaths among racers and spectators were numerous in the early years of racing, but advances in safety technology, and specifications designed by sanctioning bodies to limit speeds, have reduced the rate of fatal accidents. Major accidents have often spurred increased safety measures and rules changes. Widely considered to be the worst accident is the 1955 Le Mans disaster at 24 Hours of Le Mans that killed driver Pierre Levegh and over 80 spectators, with more than 100 being injured in total.

This is a list alphabetically sorted, and structured after the kind of competition, of the more notable driver deaths, excluding those of motorcycle riders. In addition, several racing drivers have been killed in public road crashes; see List of people who died in road accidents.

== Deaths ==
Contents
Top · A · B · C · D · E · F · G · H · I · J · K · L · M · N · O · P · Q · R · S · T · U · V · W · X · Y · Z

Name	Date of accident	Discipline	Car	Championship	Circuit/location	Event	Session	Cause	Ref.
Héctor Abate-Daga (BRA)	1958-07-13	Open wheel		Mecánica Nacional Fuerza Limitada	(Argentina) Concordia (Parque Rivadavia, Circuito San Carlos)	Primer Premio Ciudad de Concordia	Race	A broken spindle caused the car to crash and burst into flames	
Norris Abbott (USA)	1958-07-19	Drag racing			(United States) Paradise Mesa Drag Strip		Race	Transmission exploded, car caught on fire, Norris lost control of car and was ejected	
Bill Abell (USA)	1940-08-23	Stock car			(United States) Fulton Fairgrounds		Race	Lost control and car left the track	
Bud Abell (USA)	1947-11-09	Stock car			(United States) Mitchell Speedrome		Qualifying	Spun off the track, plunged over an embankment and overturned	
Dale Abendroth (USA)	1982-06-12	Stock car	Chevrolet Vega		(United States) Wisconsin International Raceway		Race	Car skidded sideways, went into a ditch, flipped upside down, and burst into flames	
Dennis Abney (USA)	1989-10-14	Stock car	Unknown	Unknown	(United States) Lakeland Interstate Raceway	Unknown	Race	Car struck by a backmarker	
Ray Abney (USA)	1973-06-10	Stock car	Unknown	Unknown	(United States) Englewood Speedway	Unknown	Race	Car burst into flames and slammed into the pit wall entrance	
Franz Abraham (FRG)	1977-04-16	Sports car	Porsche Carrera RSR	Unknown	(West Germany) Hockenheimring	Jim Clark Memorial Race	Practice	Drove straight into a concrete wall	
Marguerite Accarie (FRA)	1970-05-02	Rally car		Non-championship	(France) Rallye Paris - Saint-Raphaël Féminin 1970, last special stage, Briançon-Monte Carlo	28ème Rallye Paris - Saint-Raphaël Féminin	Race	Crashed into a private vehicle	
Jean Achard (FRA)	1951-07-14	Touring car	Ferrari		(Brazil) Gávea	XII Grande Prêmio da Cidade do Rio de Janeiro	Testing	Crashed into a concrete wall	
Howard Ackley (USA)	1947-08-10	Stock car			(United States) Towanda Fairgrounds		Testing	Lost control, went through a fence and crashed into a building	
Les Adair (USA)	1948-09-19	Sprint car		Midwest Dirt Track Racing Association	(United States) Franklin Speedway	Qualifying heat race	Race	Locked wheels with another car, went through a fence and the other car landed on Adair's car	
Harry Adams (USA)	1958-06-22	Stock car	Unknown	Unknown	(United States) Rensselaer Raceway	Unknown	Race	Car crashed into the retaining wall	
Joshua William Adams (AUS)	2005-08-20	Kart	Unknown	Unknown	(Australia) Pine Creek	Unknown	Race	Kart slid and crashed into tree	
Speed Adams (USA)	1932-09-24	Unknown	Frontenac	Unknown	(United States) Fairgrounds Speedway	Unknown	Race	Blinded by dust, Adams ran over the rear wheel of another car, locked wheels, spun, his car came apart and hit the other car again: he was ejected and slid into an iron fence	
Jim Adamson (USA)	1976-05-28	Sprint car	Unknown	Unknown	(United States) Fairmont Raceway	Sprint car consolation race	Race	Right rear tire blew out, car flipped six times, hit a lightpost and landed upside down	
Grant Adcox (USA)	1989-11-19	Stock car	Oldsmobile Cutlass	NASCAR Winston Cup Series	(United States) Atlanta Motor Speedway	Atlanta Journal 500	Race	Equipment failure caused the car to hit a wall hard	
Lionel Aderton (USA)	1949-06-05	Hotrod	Unknown	Unknown	(United States) Holbrook Fairgrounds	Unknown	Race	Locked wheels with another car, broke the rear axle, car spun and crashed through a guard rail	
Francis Affleck (CAN)	1985-02-07	Stock car	Ford	ARCA Racing Series	(United States) Daytona International Speedway	ARCA 200	Practice	Lost control, car went airborne and rolled	
Gérard Ah Mouck (FRA)	2007-08-19	Rally car	Peugeot 306 Maxi	Mauritius Rally Championship	(Mauritius) Rallye à l'Ile Maurice	Rallye Citroën à l'Ile Maurice	Race	Heart attack	
Chris Airey (GBR)	1963-05-19	Touring car	Austin A40	Molyslip Saloon Car Championship	(United Kingdom) Brands Hatch	Molyslip Saloon Car Championship, event 10	Race	After going off track, he got back on too quickly, car rolled four times and went down an embankment (the seat came loose during the rolls and he was partially thrown out of the door)	
Bob Akin (USA)	2002-04-29	Historical sportscar	Nissan GTP ZX-Turbo	Historic Sportscar Racing	(United States) Road Atlanta	HSR Walter Mitty Challenge	Practice	Crashed into concrete barrier, car caught fire, flipped over the barrier, rolled and hit two trees	
Lamont Akins (USA)	2014-05-25	Drag racing	Plymouth Duster	Unknown	(United States) Maryland International Raceway	Custom T's Doorslammer Nationals	Post-race	Lost control, car crossed lanes, struck a concrete wall, rolled and Akins was thrown out	
Kiyoshi Akiyama (JPN)	1970-08-23	Touring car	Honda S800	Unknown	(Japan) Suzuka Circuit	12 Hours of Suzuka	Race	Akiyama's car hit another car and caught fire	
Marcel Albers (NED)	1992-04-20	Open wheel	Ralt RT36-Honda	British Formula Three	(United Kingdom) Thruxton Circuit		Race	Hit the back of Elton Julian's car, went airborne, somersaulted, and hit guardrail	
Bill Albertson (USA)	1930-08-16	Single seater	Miller	Unknown	(United States) Orange County Fair Speedway	Unknown	Qualifying	Wheel brake locked, car rolled over several times, hit a guardrail and threw Albertson out onto the track	
Michele Alboreto (ITA)	2001-04-25	Sports car	Audi R8		(Germany) EuroSpeedway Lausitz		Testing	Tire failed, car went airborne, somersaulted, roll bar collapsed and crushed Alboreto to death	
Mario Alborghetti (ITA)	1955-04-11	Open wheel	Maserati 4CLT	Formula One	(France) Circuit de Pau-Ville	Pau Grand Prix	Race	Went over a straw barricade and crashed into barriers	
Andriy Aleksandrov (UKR)	2007-09-02	Rally car	Subaru Impreza	European Rally Championship	(Bulgaria) Sliven	Rally Bulgaria	Race	Crashed into tree roof-first	
Blaise Alexander (USA)	2001-10-04	Stock car	Pontiac	ARCA Racing Series	(United States) Lowe's Motor Speedway	EasyCare 100	Race	Made contact with Kerry Earnhardt, crashed head on into a wall. The car then touched Earnhardt's car, flipping it upside down	
Randy Alexander (USA)	2018-05-05	Drag racing	Chevrolet Corvette	NHRA Mello Yello Drag Racing Series	(United States) Atlanta Dragway	NHRA Southern Nationals	Race	The car veered to the right across the center line and into the other lane, where it was t-boned at high speed by the car of Bob Mandell III	
Clifford Allison (USA)	1992-08-13	Stock car	Oldsmobile	NASCAR Busch Series	(United States) Michigan International Speedway	Detroit Gasket 200	Practice	Seat broke after he spun in turn 3 hitting the wall with the driver's side of the car	
Francisco Javier Álvarez (ESP)	2023-04-14	Rally Car		Asturias Rally Championship (Campeonato de Asturias de Rallyes)	Asturias, Spain	Rally Villa de Tineo	Race	The car left the road and crashed into a tree	
George Amick (USA)	1959-04-04	Open wheel	Epperly	USAC Championship	(United States) Daytona International Speedway	USAC 100-mile race	Race	Crashed into wall, front end sheared off, and car flipped	
Bob Anderson (GBR)	1967-08-14	Open wheel	Brabham BT11	Formula One	(United Kingdom) Silverstone		Testing	Crashed into marshal's box	
Ove Andersson (SWE)	2008-06-11	Classic rally	Volvo 544		(South Africa) Milligan Vintage Trial	39th Continental Tyre Milligan Vintage Trial		Crashed head-on into a van	
Keith Andrews (USA)	1957-05-15	Open wheel	Kurtis Kraft-Offenhauser 500G	USAC Championship	(United States) Indianapolis Motor Speedway	Indianapolis 500	Practice	Andrews stepped into Giuseppe Farina's car for a test run, but crashed. Down the frontstretch, Andrews began to slide and when he attempted to correct, the car backed into the inside wall separating the pit area. Andrews was crushed to death between the cowl and the fuel tank, but no fire broke out.	
Marcel Angel (ZAF)	2026-09-19	Sports car	Ferrari 488 GT3	Extreme Supercars	(South Africa) Killarney Motor Racing Complex	Natonal Extreme Festival	Race	Angel reportedly crashed his car at the end of the back straight, going through a wall near the entrance to the landfill site.	
Elio de Angelis (ITA) (Note: De Angelis died on May 15, 1986, the day after his accident.)	1986-05-14	Open wheel	Brabham BT55-BMW	Formula One	Circuit Paul Ricard	Formula 1 World Championship	Test‡	During tests at the Paul Ricard circuit in France, the rear wing of de Angelis's BT55 detached at high speed. Angelis died 29 hours later, at the hospital in Marseille where he had been taken, from smoke inhalation.	
Paul Armagnac (FRA)	1962-10-20	Sportscar	Matra Djet	World Sportscar Championship	(France) Autodrome de Linas-Montlhéry	1000 km de Paris	Practice	Car slid sideways, hit the right embankment, barrel-rolled across the road, smashed against a talus and he was thrown out	
Alberto Ascari (ITA)	1955-05-26	Sportscar	Ferrari 750 Monza		(Italy) Autodromo Nazionale Monza		Testing	Crashed and rolled	
Antonio Ascari (Kingdom of Italy)	1925-07-26	Open wheel	Alfa Romeo P2	Grand Prix season	(France) Autodrome de Montlhéry	French Grand Prix	Race	Crashed into a fence, rolled and was thrown out	
Manny Ayulo (USA)	1955-06-16	Open wheel	Kurtis Kraft 500C	Formula One	(United States) Indianapolis Motor Speedway	Indianapolis 500	Practice	Steering broke and he crashed into a wall	
Marc Azéma (FRA)	1954-07-12	Sportscar	D.B. Panhard Monomill	Formula Monomill	(France) Comminges	XVIIIè Circuit Automobile du Comminges	Race	Crash	
Renato Bachiochi (USA)	1935-05-19				(United States) Huntington Speedway		Race	Blinded by a cloud of dust, lost control, crashed into a wall and was thrown out of his car	
Steve Backenkeller (USA)	1970-06-20	Single seater	McNamara	Formula Vee	(United States) Road America	Sports Car Club of America June Sprints at Elkhart Lake	Race	Car rode over the wheels of another car, flipped several times and landed on the roll bar	
Bobby Baird (IRL)	1953-07-25	Sports car	Ferrari 500	Non-championship	(United Kingdom) Snetterton Motor Racing Circuit	II United States Air Force Trophy	Race	Overturned and car rolled on him: walked back to the pits, collapsed and died from a rib puncturing his lung and heart	
Scott Baker (USA)	2000-06-23	Stock car	Chevrolet Monte Carlo	ARCA Racing Series	(United States) Toledo Speedway	Bondo/Mar-Hyde Series 150	Race	Clipped by another car and crashed into the tire barrier	
Rick Baldwin (USA)	1986-06-14	Stock car	Ford Thunderbird	NASCAR Winston Cup Series	(United States) Michigan International Speedway	Miller American 400	Qualifying	Spun out and crashed backwards into a wall, died 11 years later in a coma	
Tom Baldwin (USA)	2004-09-19	Stock car	Chevrolet Monte Carlo	NASCAR Featherlite Modified Series	(United States) Thompson International Speedway	New England Dodge Dealers 150	Race	Tried to avoid a crash, was hit by another car, slid and crashed into cement blocks	
Bobby Ball (USA)	1953-01-03	Midget	Unknown		(United States) Carrell Speedway		Race	Crashed into the car of Andy Linden and flipped	
Lorenzo Bandini (ITA)	1967-05-07	Open wheel	Ferrari 312/67	Formula One	Circuit de Monaco	Monaco Grand Prix	Race	Car skidded, hit straw bales and an iron bollard, caught fire and rolled several times, landing upside down	
Ryan Bard (USA)	2007-10-21	Modified			(United States) Abilene Speedway	Southern Challenge	Race	Car rolled, landed on its roof and burst into flames	
Darren Barlow (AUS)	2025-07-26	Supersports	Stohr WF1	MSA NSW Supersports Championship	(Australia) Sydney Motorsport Park	NSW Motor Race Championship Day	Race	Car left the circuit at Turn 1 and rolled	
Emmett Barr (USA)	1996-05-23	Drag racing	1927 roadster		(United States) Quaker City Raceway		Race	Crashed into guardrail, rolled on a hill, helmet came off during rolls and he sustained massive head injuries	
George Barringer (USA)	1946-09-02	Open wheel	Shaw - Offenhauser		(United States) Lakewood Speedway	Atlanta 100-Mile National Championship Auto Race	Race	Hit by the car of George Robson, spun and was hit by another car	
Andrea Bartarelli (ITA)	2026-11-07	Rally car	Citroën C3		Montespertoli	4° Rally di Scandicci	Rally stage	Crash	
Lutz Barthel (GER)	2004-06-27	Touring car	BMW 328	Motor Racing Legends	(Germany) Nürburgring	Oldtimer Festival	Race	Car rolled at the NKG chicane	
Jörg Bastuck (GER)	2006-03-24	Rally	Citroën C2 GT	World Rally Championship	(Spain) Salou, Costa Daurada	Rally Catalunya	Race	Struck while changing tire by the car of Barry Clark	
Gary Batson (USA)	1992-05-15	Stock car	Chevrolet	NASCAR Sportsman Series	(United States) Charlotte Motor Speedway	Winston Sportsman 100	Qualifying race	Tried to avoid a spinning car, got on its side, scraped along the wall driver-side down and caught on fire	
Erwin Bauer (FRG)	1958-06-01	Sports car	Ferrari 250 TR		(West Germany) Nürburgring	Internationales ADAC 1000 Kilometer Rennen Nürburgring	Post-race	Kept racing after the checkered flag, tried to pass a slower car, slid and hit trees	
Carel Godin de Beaufort (NED)	1964-08-01	Open wheel	Porsche 718	Formula One	(West Germany) Nürburgring	German Grand Prix	Practice	Left the road at Bergwerk, went down an embankment and hit a tree	
Don Beauman (GBR)	1955-07-09	Open wheel	Connaught A Type		(Republic of Ireland) Wicklow	Leinster Trophy	Race	Crashed down a hill, hit a tree and caught on fire	
Jean Behra (FRA)	1959-08-01	Sports car	Porsche 718 RSK		(West Germany) AVUS	German Grand Prix support race	Race	Lost control at the banking, hit a concrete building at the top of the banking, was thrown out and hit a flagpole	
Stefan Bellof (FRG)	1985-09-01	Sports car	Porsche 956	World Sportscar Championship	(Belgium) Circuit de Spa-Francorchamps	1000 km Spa	Race	Collided with Jacky Ickx's Porsche 962C and ran off into the barriers	
Georges Berger (BEL)	1967-08-23	Sports car	Porsche 911		(West Germany) Nürburgring	Marathon de la Route	Race	Went off the road, fell into a ravine and hit a tree	
Max Berney (SUI)	1956-04-29	Touring car	Alfa Romeo Giulietta SV	World Sportscar Championship	(Italy) Mille Miglia	Mille Miglia	Race	Ivo Badaracco lost control of his car and crashed off the road, killing his navigator, Max Berney	
Jacques Bernusset (FRA)	1966-05-01	Single seater	Cooper T76 - Ford	Formula 3	(France) Magny-Cours	V Grand Prix de Nivernais	Race	Lost control of the car, went off the road, rolled several times, hit a tree and burst into flames	
Attilio Bettega (ITA)	1985-05-02	Rally	Lancia 037	World Rally Championship	(France) Zérubia-Santa Giulia stage, Corsica	Tour de Corse	Race	Car slid, hit a pole, fell down a ravine and crashed into a tree on the right side of the roof	
Tony Bettenhausen (USA)	1961-05-12	Open wheel	Watson - Offenhauser	USAC Championship	(United States) Indianapolis Motor Speedway	Indianapolis 500	Practice	An anchor bolt fell off the front radius rod support, causing the front axle to misalign when braking, which in turn caused the car to turn into the wall, roll along the wall and land upside down in the grass	
Jules Bianchi (FRA)	2014-10-05	Open wheel	Marussia MR03	Formula One	(Japan) Suzuka Circuit	Japanese Grand Prix	Race	Lost control; crashed into a recovery vehicle, suffering a brain injury; died on July 17, 2015, after spending nine months in a coma	
Lucien Bianchi (BEL)	1969-03-30	Sports car	Alfa Romeo T33	World Sportscar Championship	(France) Circuit de la Sarthe	24 Heures du Mans - essais préliminaires	Testing	Lost control, crashed into a telegraph pole and disintegrated the car into fire	
Lee Bible (USA)	1929-03-13	Land speed record	White Triplex		(United States) Ormond Beach, Florida		Record attempt	Crashed into a dune after the gas was released too quickly and was thrown from the car	
Gerry Birrell (GBR)	1973-06-23	Open wheel	Chevron B25	European Formula Two	(France) Rouen-Les-Essarts	XXI Grand Prix de Rouen	Race	Front left tire deflated and crashed into the Armco barrier. The Armco parted and Birrell suffered fatal head injuries.	
Art Bisch (USA)	1958-07-04	Open wheel	Kuzma - Offenhauser	USAC Championship Car	(United States) Lakewood Speedway	Atlanta 100-Mile Race	Race	Lost control and flipped twice	
Harry Blanchard (USA)	1960-01-30	Sports car	Porsche 718 RSK	World Sportscar Championship	(Argentina) Autódromo Municipal-Avenida Paz	1000 km Buenos Aires	Race	Crashed into the car of Heini Walter and rolled	
Marcin Błaszczyński (POL)	1994-10-08	Touring car	Fiat Cinquecento	Polish Fiat Cinquecento Sporting Cup	(Poland) Tor Poznań	Polski - Puchar Cinquecento Sporting - trzeci wyścig	Qualifying	Left the road and rolled several times	
John Blewett III (USA)	2007-08-16	Stock car	Chevrolet	NASCAR Whelen Modified Tour	(United States) Thompson International Speedway	New England Dodge Dealers 150	Race	Was hit by his brother Jimmy's car and was crushed under the weight	
Anita Board (AUS)	2017-11-11	Drag racing			(Australia) Perth Motorplex	Junior Dragster licence pass	Qualifying	The eight~year~old was participating in her first solo run and was attempting to gain her racing license when she lost control of her car and crashed into a concrete wall; life support was turned off the following day.	
Nicky Bogdan (USA)	1958-10-12	Drag racing			(United States) Great Lakes Dragway		Race	Veered left off of the track and plowed through a field	
Felice Bonetto (ITA)	1953-11-21	Sports car	Lancia D24	World Sportscar Championship	Silao, Mexico	Carrera Panamericana	Race	Crashed into the balcony of a house and hit his head on it	
Sébastien Bonisseau (FRA)	2015-05-20	Rally	Ford Escort MkII	Unknown	(Morocco) Rallye du Maroc Historique	VI Rallye du Maroc Historique	Rally	Car lost control, went into ditch; as the driver came out to get back onto the track, he was hit by another car	
Neil Bonnett (USA)	1994-02-11	Stock car	Chevrolet	NASCAR Winston Cup Series	(United States) Daytona International Speedway	Daytona 500	Practice	Spun and slammed head-on into the wall at turn 4	
Joakim Bonnier (SWE)	1972-06-11	Sports car	Lola T280	World Sportscar Championship	(France) Circuit de la Sarthe	24 Hours of Le Mans	Race	Crashed into another car trying to avoid him and rolled into the forest	
Joe Booher (USA)	1993-02-12	Stock car		NASCAR Goody's Dash Series	(United States) Daytona International Speedway	Florida Dash 200	Race	Crashed into a car, turned sideways, hit the wall and was hit by another car	
Pietro Bordino (ITA)	1928-04-22	Open wheel	Bugatti 35B		Alessandria, Italy		Practice	Car hit a dog, jammed the steering, the car lost control, flew in the air and fell into the Tanaro river	
Possum Bourne (NZL)	2003-04-18	Hillclimbing	Subaru Forester		Cardrona, New Zealand	Race to the Sky	Pre-race recon	Crashed into by another car while trying to avoid it	
William Bourque (CAN)	1909-08-19	Open wheel	Knox	AAA Championship Car	(United States) Indianapolis Motor Speedway	Prest-O-Lite Trophy Race	Race	Suffered a suspected rear-axle failure resulting in his car flipping end over end on the front stretch.	
Baconin Borzacchini (ITA)	1933-09-10	Open wheel	Maserati 8CM	Grand Prix season	(Italy) Autodromo Nazionale Monza	Grand Prix	Race	Veered off the road, hit the car of Giuseppe Campari and was thrown out	
Guy Bouriat (FRA)	1933-05-21	Open wheel	Bugatti T51		(France) Péronne, Somme	Picardy Grand Prix	Race	Crashed into another car, left the road, crashed into a tree and caught fire	
Joe Boyer (USA)	1924-09-01	Open wheel	Duesenberg	American Automobile Association National Championship	(United States) Altoona Speedway	Fall classic	Race	A tire blew out and he crashed into the upper guardrail	
Dave Bradway Jr. (USA)	1987-06-21	Sprint car			(United States) Skagit Speedway	Super Dirt Cup	Race	Touched wheels with another car, car slammed outside wall nose first, flipped six times, slammed the wall again, tail first, it spun in the air and landed upside down	
Don Branson (USA)	1966-11-12	Sprint car		USAC sprint car	(United States) Ascot Park		Race	Crashed into by the car of Dick Atkins after coming off the wall and rolled over	
Scott Brayton (USA)	1996-05-17	Open wheel	Lola T9500	Indy Racing League	(United States) Indianapolis Motor Speedway	Indianapolis 500	Practice	Rear tire deflated, car spun and slammed into the wall at 230 mph, hitting his head against the barrier	
Josef Brázdil (CZE)	1934-08-27	Open wheel	Maserati 6C-34		(Czech Republic) Masaryk Circuit	Masaryk Grand Prix	Practice	Left wheels went into a ditch, failed to control the car, crashed into a tree and was thrown out; the car continued, hit another tree, went into the air and somersaulted	
Craig Breen (IRE)	2023-04-13	Rally car	Hyundai i20 N Rally1	World Rally Championship (Testing)	(Croatia) Lobor	Private testing	Testing	Ran wide on a 90° corner and hit a wooden pole, which pierced the driver's window	
Gastone Brilli-Peri (ITA)	1930-03-22	Open wheel	Talbot 700		(Libya) Tripoli	Tripoli Grand Prix	Practice	Car bounced on the rough surface of the road, went into the right embankment, hit a small wall, rolled and he was thrown out	
Chris Bristow (GBR)	1960-06-19	Open wheel	Cooper T51	Formula One	(Belgium) Circuit de Spa-Francorchamps	Belgian Grand Prix	Race	Touched wheels with the car of Willy Mairesse, lost control, crashed into an embankment, rolled and he was thrown into barbed wire	
Peter Brock (AUS)	2006-08-08	Sports car	Motec Daytona	Australian Targa Championship	(Australia) Gidgegannup	Quit Targa West Rally 2006	Race	Skidded on a corner and hit a tree	
Dennis Brooks (USA)	2001-06-01				(United States) Auto City Speedway		Race	Heart attack	
Jonel Broscanc (USA)	1992-06-06	Rally car	Audi Quattro	SCCA ProRally	(United States) Susquehannock Trail Performance Rally	Susquehannock Trail Performance Rally	Race	Crashed into a tree after sliding in a curve	
Jim Brouk (USA)	1990-04-15	Open wheel	Ralt RT-4	SCCA club race	(United States) Indianapolis Raceway Park		Race	Crashed into a guardrail	
Jean-Pierre Brousselet (FRA)	1958-06-22	Sports car	Jaguar D-Type	World Sportscar Championship	(France) Circuit de la Sarthe	24 Hours of Le Mans	Race	Fatally injured when his Jaguar went out of control just beyond the Dunlop Bridge	
David Bruce-Brown (USA)	1912-10-01	Open wheel	Fiat	American Automobile Association National Championship	(United States) Wauwatosa road track	Vanderbilt Cup	Practice	Tire blew out, car flipped and he was thrown out	
Jimmy Bryan (USA)	1960-06-19	Open wheel	Watson-Offenhauser	USAC Championship	(United States) Langhorne Speedway	Langhorne 100-Mile Race	Race	Slid, dug in the dirt, touched the car of Jim Hurtubise, went in the air and flipped end over end	
Marian Bublewicz (POL)	1993-02-20	Rally car	Ford Sierra Cosworth 4x4	Polish Rally Championship	(Poland) Winter Lower Silesian Rally	Winter Lower Silesian Rally	Race	Went out of control, left the road and crashed into a tree on the driver's side	
Ivor Bueb (GBR)	1959-07-26	Open wheel	Cooper T51	BP Trophy	(France) Clermont-Ferrand	II Trophée d'Auvergne	Race	Overshot the corner, crashed and was thrown out	
Sébastien Bühlmann (SUI)	2004-04-24	Rally	Peugeot 106 Rallye	Swiss Rally Championship	(Switzerland) Rallye Critérium Jurassien	27ème Rallye Critérium Jurassien	Race	Left the road and crashed	
Johan Bullens (BEL)	2004-07-11	Touring car	BMW M3	Zolder Touring Cup	(Belgium) Circuit Zolder	Zolder Touring Cup, third round	Race	Had a heart attack and crashed into a concrete wall	
Hans-Georg Bürger (FRG)	1980-08-20	Sports car	Tiga F280 BMW	European Formula Two	(Netherlands) Zandvoort	XXVIII Grote Prijs van Zanvoort	Warm-up	Went off the road, hit the guard rail head-on and hit his head on a fence pole	
Mike Burgmann (AUS)	1986-10-05	Touring car	Holden Commodore VK SS	Australian Endurance Championship	(Australia) Mount Panorama Circuit	James Hardie 1000	Race	Gust of wind lifted the car up, pushed it onto outside the track and caused the car to hit a tire barrier; the impact caused the engine to go into the cockpit	
Bob Burman (USA)	1916-04-08	Sports car	Peugeot		(United States) Corona	Corona Road Race	Race	One of the wheels broke, sending the car over the curb, going through a crowd barrier and hitting a telephone pole	
Josh Burton (USA)	2013-05-24	Sprint car		Winners Circle Designs	(United States) Bloomington Speedway		Race	Began flipping, another car made contact and his head was by another car	
Oscar Cabalén (ARG)	1967-08-25	Sport prototype	Ford Prototipo TC F.100	Sport Prototipo Argentino	San Nicolas, Siderurgia	Argentine Grand Prix	Testing	Car veered to the left, rode over the escape lane, crossed the pavement, climbed an embankment, jumped in the air, caught on fire, flew and landed on all four wheels again	
Charles Cabannes (FRA)	1991-01-11	Rally	Mercedes-Benz		Dakar Rally	Paris-Dakar Rally	Race	Shot by Malian rebels	
Steve Cabelo (FRA)	2016-04-03	Hillclimbing	Mitsubishi Lancer Evolution	Championnat de France de la Montagne	Bagnols Sabran	46ème Course de Côte Nationale de Bagnols Sabran	Race	Lost control of the car, hit a light pole and a tree	
Giulio Cabianca (ITA)	1961-06-15	Open wheel	Cooper-Ferrari	Formula One	Modena Autodrome		Practice	Gearbox failure caused the car to not slow down in a turn, went through a gate to find an escape route, hit a bystander, crossed a street and crashed into the wall of a workshop	
Juan Carlos Cabrera (ARG)	1984-08-07	Stock car	IKA-Renault Torino	Turismo Carretera	Autódromo Juan y Oscar Gálvez		Series test	Heart attack	
Joe Caccia (ITA)	1931-05-26	Open wheel	Duesenberg Jones & Maley	AAA Championship Car	Indianapolis Motor Speedway	Indianapolis 500	Practice	Went over the turn 2 wall, hit a tree, split the fuel tank and set the car on fire	
Attilio Caffaratti (ITA)	1900-09-10	Trike	Darracq-Soncin		Circuit Brescia	Coppa Florio	Race	Slid off of a slippery road, went into a ditch and hit his head on a tree	
James Cagle (USA)	1969-08-16	Drag Racing	Chrysler		Oklahoma City International Raceway		Pre-race	Dragster was on jacks when the throttle stuck, car fell off the jack, sped off into a fence and crashed into trees; a piece of metal came from the cockpit and entered his helmet	
David Caid (USA)	1961-03-12	Sprint car		California Racing Association	Imperial Valley Speedway		Race	Car bumped into the back of another car, ran over the back wheels and went end-over-end several times	
Giuseppe Campari (ITA)	1933-09-10	Open wheel	Alfa Romeo Tipo B	Grand Prix season	Monza	Italian Grand Prix	Race	Car skidded on a patch of oil, hit a stone, flipped and crushed him	
Marco Campos (BRA)	1995-10-15	Open wheel	Lola-T95/50	International Formula 3000	Magny-Cours	Magny-Cours F-3000	Race	Car ran over the back of Thomas Biagi's car, flipped and slid upside down on the retaining wall, ripping off the rollbar and striking Campos' head against the wall	
Eugenio Castellotti (ITA)	1957-03-14	Open wheel	Ferrari 801	Formula One	Modena Autodrome		Testing	Lost control, overturned and slammed into a concrete barrier, throwing Castellotti out	
Julio César Castrillo (ESP)	2023-04-14	Rally Car		Asturias Rally Championship (Campeonato de Asturias de Rallyes)	Asturias, Spain	Rally Villa de Tineo	Race	The car left the road and crashed into a tree	
Timothy Cathcart (GBR)	2014-08-15	Rally car	Citroën DS3	British Rally Championship	Todds Leap Ulster Rally	Ulster Rally	Race	Lost control, left the road and crashed	
Philip Catlin (AUS)	1956-11-28	Sports car	Bugatti Type 51		Albert Park Circuit	The Argus Trophy	Race	Crash	
François Cevert (FRA)	1973-10-06	Open wheel	Tyrrell 006-Ford Cosworth DFV	Formula One	Watkins Glen International	United States Grand Prix	Qualifying	Bumped the kerbs, causing him to swerve the right hand side of the track, touching the safety barrier and causing him to crash into the barriers on the other side head-on, uprooting and lifting the barrier and killing him instantly. His body was cut in half between his neck and hip due to the barrier.	
Olivier Chandon de Brailles (FRA)	1983-03-02	Open wheel	Fred Opert Racing Ralt RT-1 Cosworth BDA	Formula Mondial North American Cup	Palm Beach, FL	Pre-season testing	Testing	Crashed into barrier, slid into canal. Drowned while trapped in overturned car.	
Nand Lal Chaudhary (IND)	2001-10-12	Rally car	Maruti Gypsy		Raid de Himalaya	3rd Maruti Raid de Himalaya	Race	Fell into a gorge	
Zygmunt Chełstowski (POL)	1975-04-29	Rally car	Polski Fiat 125p	Rajdowe Samochodowe Mistrzostwa Polski	Rajd Kormoran	VIII. Rajd Kormoran	Race	Crashed into a tree	
Gaston Chevrolet (FRA)	1920-11-25	Open wheel	Frontenac	American Automobile Association National Championship	Beverly Hills Speedway	Beverly Hills 200-Mile Race	Race	Crashed into the car of Eddie O’Donnell	
Ettore Chimeri (VEN)	1960-02-27	Sports car	Ferrari 250 Testa Rossa		Camp Freedom	Gran Premio de Cuba	Practice	Car crashed through barriers and plunged 150 feet (46 metres)	
Henri Cissac (FRA)	1908-07-07	Sports car	Panhard et Levassor		Circuit de la Seine-Inferieure	Grand Prix de l'Automobile Club de France	Race	Equipment failure	
Jim Clark (GBR)	1968-04-07	Open wheel	Lotus 48 Cosworth-FVA	European Formula Two	Hockenheim	II Deutschland Trophae	Race	Slipped on wet track, lost control and careened into trees	
Bryan Clauson (USA)	2016-08-07	Midget	Spike Chassis Midget	USAC	Belleville High Banks	Belleville Midget Nationals	Race	Collided with a lapped vehicle while leading and flipped several times and was subsequently hit by another car in the cockpit area, causing serious brain injuries.	
Jeff Clinton (USA)	2002-03-01	Sports car	Lola B2K/40	Grand American	Homestead-Miami Speedway	Nextel 250	Practice	Crash	
Gonzalo Clopatofsky (COL)	2014-09-19	Touring car		TC2000 Colombia Championship	Tocancipá		Testing	Crashed into a wall and went into a lagoon	
Graham Coaker (GBR)	1971-04-12	Open wheel	March 712M		Silverstone Circuit		Testing	Died due to sepsis from a crash he had earlier	
Tom Cole (GBR)	1953-06-14	Sports car	Ferrari 340 MM Spyder Vignale	World Sportscar Championship	Circuit de la Sarthe	24 Hours of Le Mans	Race	Lost control after passing a slower car	
Chad Coleman (USA)	1998-08-28	Stock car	Ford Thunderbird	ARCA Racing Series	Atlanta Motor Speedway	ARCA Georgia Power 200	Race	Crash	
Peter Collins (GBR)	1958-08-03	Open wheel	Ferrari Dino 246	Formula One	Nürburgring	German GP	Race	Car encountered a ditch, lost control and flipped, landing upside down. He was thrown from the car and hit a tree, causing severe head injuries	
Mark Colton (GBR)	1995-08-05	Sports car	Pilbeam MP72-Judd CV 3.5	British Hill Climb Championship	Craigantlet Hillclimb	Craigantlet Hillclimb	Practice	Equipment failure	
Jessi Combs (USA)	2019-08-27		North American Eagle		Alvord Desert	Land Speed Record	Record attempt	At more than 500 mph, hit an object which caused front wheel to collapse. Died of blunt force trauma	
Corky Cookman (USA)	1987-07-19	Modified		NASCAR Featherlite Modified Series	Thompson International Speedway	Winston 75	Race	Equipment failure caused his car to crash into a wall at a severe angle	
Ashley Cooper (AUS)	2008-02-25	Touring car	Holden VZ Commodore	Fujitsu V8 Supercar Series	Adelaide Street Circuit	Clipsal 500 (support race)	Race	Hit the wall, spun round and hit the other wall backwards	
Piers Courage (GBR)	1970-06-21	Open wheel	De Tomaso 505/38	Formula One	Circuit Zandvoort	Dutch Grand Prix	Race	Went up an embankment, disintegrated and burst into flames	
Nino Crespi (ITA)	1934-10-03	Open wheel	Bugatti		Gávea Street Circuit	Il Grande Premio de Cidade do Rio de Janeiro	Race	Crash	
Sergio Cresto (USA)	1986-05-02	Rally	Lancia Delta S4	World Rally Championship	Tour de Corse	Tour de Corse	Rally	Was the co-driver of Henri Toivonen, the car hit the outside wall, left the track and caught fire	
Stanisław Czaykowski (POL)	1933-09-10	Open wheel	Bugatti T54		Autodromo Nazionale Monza	Monza Grand Prix	Race	Crash	
Cayetano D'Amico (ARG)	1931-09-06	Stock car	Gardner (automobile)		Arrecifes	Gran Premio de Arrecifes	Race	Flipped after hitting a spectator	
Guido D'Ippolito (ITA)	1933-10-08	Touring car	Alfa Romeo 8C 2600MM	Unknown	Circuito delle Province Meridionali	I Circuito delle Province Meridionali, 1a Coppa Principessa di Piemonte	Race	Hit a horse carriage and hit his head on the axle of the carriage	
Guido Dada (ITA)	1986-05-04	Truck	Iveco 190/38	FIA European Truck Racing Championship	Zolder	Truck Super Prix	Race	Truck rolled and he was crushed inside	
Silvio Dal Cin (ITA)	1954-05-02	Sports car	Maserati A6GCS	World Sportscar Championship	Mille Miglia	Mille Miglia	Race	Car driven by Ferdinando Mancini, crashed into signpoint, killing Dal Cin	
Paul Dana (USA)	2006-03-26	Open wheel	Dallara/Honda	IndyCar Series	Homestead-Miami Speedway	Toyota Indy 300	Practice	Crashed into the disabled car of Ed Carpenter at 176 mph	
Fabio Danti (ITA)	2000-06-03	Sports car	Osella/PA 20S BMW	Campionato Italiano Velocità Montagna	Caprino-Spiazzi		Hillclimb	Crashed into a tree	
Jimmy Davies (USA)	1966-06-11	Midget			Santa Fe Speedway		Warm-up	Crashed into a wall	
Lex Davison (AUS)	1965-02-20	Open wheel	Brabham/Climax	Tasman Series	Sandown Raceway	International 100	Practice	Heart attack	
Alfonso de Portago (SPA)	1957-05-12	Sports car	Ferrari 335 S	World Sportscar Championship	Guidizzolo	Mille Miglia	Race	De Portago's front tire exploded. He lost control of the car; hit a telephone pole, jumped over a brook, then the car bounced back on to the road, slid over the road, spinning, and ended up, wheels down, in a brook at the other side of the road. Besides de Portago, his navigator Edmont Nelson, ten spectators – among them five children – died	
Patrick Depailler (FRA)	1980-08-01	Open wheel	Alfa Romeo 179	Formula One	Hockenheimring	German Grand Prix	Testing	Suspension failure caused the car to crash into the wall with fatal head injuries	
Sergio Der Stephanian (ITA)	1958-05-11	Sports car	Ferrari 250 GT LWB	World Sportscar Championship	Circuito Piccolo delle Madonie	Targa Florio	Pre-race accident	His car was in a collision with a sand-laden lorry. He died shortly after in hospital	
Léon Dernier (BEL)	1969-07-26	Touring car	Mazda R100	European Touring Car Championship	Circuit de Spa-Francorchamps	Spa 24 Hours	Race	Crash	
Fred DeSarro (USA)	1978-08-08	Modified	Len Boehler 3	NASCAR Modified Series	Thompson International Speedway	Thompson 150	Practice	Crashed into a sand barrier when the throttle stuck	
Christian Devereux (GBR)	2013-05-05	Touring car	Mini Cooper S	Masters Historic Racing Pre-66 Touring Car Championship	Donington Park	Donington Historic Festival - Masters Pre-66 Touring Cars Race	Race	Crashed into another car	
Mark Donohue (USA)	1975-08-19	Open wheel	March 751	Formula One	Österreichring	Austrian Grand Prix	Practice	A tire failure caused the car to crash into the wall and vault over the fence: died of a blood clot in the brain two days later	
Tommy Druar (USA)	1989-06-10	Stock car	Chevrolet Cavalier	NASCAR Modified	Lancaster Speedway	30-lap NASCAR Modified race	Race	Crash - jumped wheels with another car - hit wall driver's side first	
Ronnie Duman (USA)	1968-06-09	Open wheel	Gerhardt/Ford	USAC Championship	Milwaukee Mile	Rex Mays 150	Race	Crashed into the car of Bay Darnell, caught fire and was hit by another car	
Clive Dunfee (GBR)	1932-09-24	Endurance	Bentley Speed Six	BRDC	Brooklands	BRDC 500 Miles	Race	Car cartwheeled, hit a tree and he was ejected	
Arie Duyzers (NED)	1985-06-02	Touring car			IJsselstein		Race	Lost control and rolled several times	
Eugene Earixson (USA)	1948-09-12	Stock car			Chariton Speed Bowl		Race	Car bumped from behind and flipped	
Cameron Earl (GBR)	1952-06-18	Open wheel	English Racing Automobiles	Formula One	MIRA Ltd.		Private test	Lost control, went off the track and rolled several times	
Dale Earnhardt (USA)	2001-02-18	Stock car	Chevrolet Monte Carlo	NASCAR Winston Cup Series	Daytona International Speedway	Daytona 500	Race	Tagged by another car and crashed head on into a wall at 160 mph	
Sonny Easley (USA)	1978-01-15	Stock car	1968 Camaro	Grand American Sportsman Series	Riverside Raceway	Stock Car Products 300	Practice	Lost control and crashed into a pickup truck and trailer; also killed a pit crew member	
Sean Edwards (GBR)	2013-10-15	Touring car	Porsche 996		Queensland Raceway		Private test	He was killed in a crash as a passenger, when it hit a tire wall protecting a concrete barrier	
Bill Egleston (USA)	2018-01-16	Modified	Victory Circle Chassis	International Motor Contest Association - Modifieds	Perris Auto Speedway	International Motor Contest Association Modified Winter Heat	Race	He lost control, rode up the retaining wall and flipped. His car was then hit into the drivers side by another car, while it was lying on its roof	
Stefan Eickelmann (GER)	1998-10-10	Touring car	BMW M3	VLN	Nurburgring	22. DMV-250-Meilen-Rennen, Veranstaltergemeinschaft Langstreckenpokal Nürburgring (Veedol-Cup), 9th round	Race	Heart attack	
Ed Elisian (USA)	1959-08-30	Open wheel	Travelon Trailer Special	USAC Championship	Milwaukee Mile	Milwaukee 200	Race	Fuel cell ruptured in crash and he burned to death	
John Engle (USA)	2007-08-19	Touring car	BMW M3	National Auto Sport Association	Mid-Ohio Sports Car Course	Unknown	Race	Spun in oil and crashed into a parked car	
Sébastien Enjolras (FRA)	1997-05-03	Sportscar	WR LM97	Non-championship	Circuit de la Sarthe	24 Hours of Le Mans	Pre-race test	Part of the rear bodywork of his car came loose, causing it to airborne and exploded in flames	
Marcel Escoda (AND)	2003-09-06	Rally car	Mitsubishi Lancer Evo VI	Catalan Rallying Championship	Criterium del Berguedà	XXXII Criterium del Berguedà	Race	Crashed into a tree	
Richie Evans (USA)	1985-10-24	Stock car	Chevrolet Cavalier	NASCAR Featherlite Modified Series	Martinsville Speedway	Winn-Dixie 500 modified feature	Practice	Crashed heavily in the turn 3 wall and died of a basilar skull fracture	
Bunk Ezzell (USA)	1950-07-24	Stock car	Buick		Warner Robins Super Speedway		Qualifying	Rolled and caught on fire	
Bertrand Fabi (CAN)	1986-02-21	Open wheel	Ralt R30	Formula 3	Goodwood Circuit		Testing	Left the road because of icy conditions, hit the barriers and rolled	
Juan Oscar Facchini (ARG)	1964-11-15	Stock car	Chevrolet Cupé	Turismo Carretera	Tandil	XII Vuelta de Tandil Ciudad de Turismo	Race	Lost control of the car and crashed into a bus, splitting the car in half	
Milan Facek (CZE)	1986-08-03	Rally car	Lada VFTS	European Rally Championship	Rally Vida	XVI Rally Vida	Rally	Lost control and hit a tree	
Frank Facenda (USA)	1947-09-12	Midget car			Seekonk Speedway		Race	Overturned and spun into a rail	
Luigi Fagioli (ITA)	1952-05-31	Sportscar	Lancia Aurelia B20	Non-championship	Circuit de Monaco	Monaco Grand Prix	Practice	Crashed into stone balustrade and thrown out of car	
Miroslav Fajkus (CZE)	2008-05-04	Sports car	Lola T99/50	Czech Hillclimb Championship	Náměšť nad Oslavou	XXVII Zámecký vrch Mann Filter - Náměšť nad Oslavou	Hillclimb	Went off the road, hit a small hill and crashed into a tree	
Guido Falaschi (ARG)	2011-11-13	Stock car	Ford Falcon	Turismo Carretera	Autódromo Juan Manuel Fangio		Race	Crashed into tire wall and hit by another car on driver's side door	
Walt Faulkner (USA)	1956-04-22	Stock car	Ford	USAC Late Model Championship	Vallejo Raceway		Qualifier	Hit rut, flipped, was partially ejected when the car rolled on him	
Věra Filipová (CZE)	2013-06-01	Rally car	Mitsubishi Lancer Evo IX	Central Europe Rally Cup Championship	Rallye Templice	1. Rallye Teplice 2013	Race	Left the road, rolled and hit a tree	
David Fisher (USA)	2001-01-13	Touring car	BMW M3	SCCA	Phoenix International Raceway	Unknown	Qualifying	Crashed into wall at turn 4	
Jean-Antoine Fiori (FRA)	2022-03-06	Rally car	Peugeot 208 R2	France Cup	(France) Rallye Régional Eccica-Suarella	Rallye Régional d'Eccica Suaredda 2022	Race	Lost control and slid into a ravine.	
Jim Fitzgerald (USA)	1987-11-08	Sports car	Nissan 300ZX Turbo	Trans-Am Championship	Streets of St. Petersburg, Florida	Grand Prix of St. Petersburg	Race	Crashed into barrier at 100 mph and broke his neck on impact	
Al Fleming (GBR)	2014-04-11	Touring car	Lotus Elan		Hockenheimring	Hockenheim Historic – Das Jim Clark Revival	Qualifying	Went out of control and flipped	
Billy Foster (CAN)	1967-01-20	Stock car	Dodge Charger	NASCAR Grand National Series	Riverside International Raceway	Motor Trend 500	Practice	Wheel drum broke and crashed into wall when his head struck the barrier	
Eric Forrest-Greene (ARG)	1954-01-25	Sports car	Aston Martin DB3	World Sportscar Championship	Autódromo Municipal-Avenida Paz	1000 km Buenos Aires	Race	Crashed and rolled his car, landing upside in flames. Later died from his injuries	
Roger Freeman (GBR)	2003-07-12	Rally car	Subaru WRX	SCCA ProRally Championship	Oregon Trail SCCA ProRally	Oregon Trail Rally	Race	Crashed into a tree	
Rodger Freeth (NZL)	1993-09-19	Rally car	Subaru Legacy	World Rally Championship	Third rally stage at Mundaring	Rally Australia	Race	Crashed into pine plantation. He later died in hospital after his lungs were crushed when the mounting points of his harnesses where realigned due to the impact.	
Piero Frescobaldi (ITA)	1964-07-25	Touring car	Lancia Flavia	Non-championship	Circuit de Spa-Francorchamps	Spa 24 Hours	Race	Went off the road and rolled	
Joe Fry (GBR)	1950-07-29		Freikaiserwagen		Blanford Circuit	Blandford Hillclimb	Practice	Crashed off of road	
Yukio Fukuzawa (JPN)	1969-02-12	Sports car	Toyota 7		Fuji Speedway		Testing	Car went off-road and crashed into sign	
Ross Fyfe (AUS)	1991-12-28	Stock car	Holden Torana	Tasmanian Super Sedan Championship	Derwent Valley Speedway		Race	Bounced off of a wall, stuck the throttle and slammed head on into the inside wall	
Ray Gaarsland (USA)	1962-08-19	Stock car	Unknown	Lake Region Racing Association Championship	Weetown Outlaw Speedway	Unknown	Race	His car flipped and his seat belt was ripped away from its moorings	
Marcos Gaggino (ARG)	1984-05-09	Stock car	Ford Falcon (Argentina) SP221	Turismo Carretera	Punta Alta	IV Vuelta de la Ciudad de Punta Alta	Test	Tried to avoid a truck, lost control, hit an embankment, rolled several times, crashed into a small wall and was thrown out	
Totò Gagliano (ITA)	2000-09-01	Hillclimbing	Honda Civic	Non-championship	Nicolosi-Etna	37° Corsa dell'Etna	Hillclimb	Crashed into a wall to avoid another car and died 34 days later	
Mike Gagliardo (USA)	2001-05-20	Sports car	Chevrolet Corvette	Trans-Am Series	Mosport International Raceway	Trans-Am Series 125	Race	Spun out, stalled and hit by another car	
David Gaines (USA)	1990-05-16	Stock car	Oldsmobile	NASCAR Limited Sportsman Division	Lowes Motor Speedway	Unknown	Practice	Hit by the car of Peter Gibbons in the rear and then hit broadside by the car of Steve McEachern	
John Gall (USA)	1975-08-08	Midget	Unknown	USAC National Midget Series	Indianapolis Speedrome	Unknown	Race	Struck a concrete wall, flipped over it, and slammed into a light pole: caused by a stuck throttle	
Frank Galvin (USA)	1916-12-03	Open wheel	Premier		Uniontown Speedway	Universal Trophy	Race	Crashed into grandstand	
Ian Gammon-Hardaway (GBR)	1991-05-26	Rally car	Citroën 2CV	Citroën 2CV National Championship	Lydden Hill		Race	Seat collapsed after the car went off the road	
Jerry Gannon (USA)	2002-06-01	Drag Racing	Chevrolet Camaro	Jet Funny Car	Atlanta Dragway		Race	Hit two walls, flipped and caught fire	
Dean Gardner (USA)	1946-10-03	Midget	Ford		Phoenix Speedway		Race	Crash	
Johnny Garrett (USA)	1953-03-15	Sprint car		WCRA Sprint Cars	Clovis Speedway		Race	Hit car of George Amick, hit wall and flipped	
Jo Gartner (AUT)	1986-06-01	Sports car	Porsche 962C	World Sportscar Championship	Circuit de la Sarthe	24 Hours of Le Mans	Race	Crashed into the concrete barrier on Mulsanne Straight, somersaulted, hit a phone pole and caught fire	
Ray Gastelu (USA)	2001-06-30	Stock car			Wall Township Speedway		Race	Heart attack	
Jean Gaupillat (FRA)	1934-07-22	Open wheel	Bugatti T51	Grand Prix season	Dieppe	Grand Prix de Dieppe	Race	Crashed into a tree	
Chris Gehrke (USA)	1991-05-04	Stock car	Oldsmobile	ARCA RE/MAX Series	Talladega Superspeedway	Poulan Pro 500-K	Race	Flipped several times and was hit by another car	
Ignazio Giunti (ITA)	1971-01-10	Sports car	Ferrari 312PB	World Sportscar Championship	Autódromo Juan y Oscar Gálvez	1000 km Buenos Aires	Race	Crashed into the stopped car of Jean-Pierre Beltoise, somersaulted and caught fire	
Fritz Glatz (AUT)	2002-07-14	Open wheel	Arrows Footwork FA17 - Ford	Euroboss	Autodrom Most		Race	Hit curb, somersaulted and was destroyed	
Ab Goedemans (NED)	1968-08-30	Sportscar	Fiat-Abarth 1000SP	Non-championship	Nürburgring	ADAC 500 km-Rennen	Practice	Left the road while overtaking another car and was thrown out	
Bob Goldich (USA)	1957-03-23	Sports car	Arnolt-Bristol Bolide	World Sportscar Championship	Sebring International Raceway	12-Hour Florida International Grand Prix of Endurance for the Amoco Trophy	Race	Crashed at the esses, flipped his car several times. He died instantly of a fractured skull and broken neck	
Joseph Göttgens (NED)	1957-05-12	Sports car	Triumph TR3	World Sportscar Championship	near Florence	Mille Miglia	Race	He crashed his car near Florence and died of his injuries in a hospital	
Mike Grbac (USA)	1978-11-29	Stock car	AMC Gremlin		Reading Fairgrounds Speedway	Schmidt's 200	Race	Hit by another car roof first	
Jeff Green (USA)	2018-06-16	Open wheel	Lola T300	Vintage Automobile Racing Association of Canada	Canadian Tire Motorsport Park		Race	Made hard contact with wall outside turn 8	
Paul Greifzu (GER)	1952-05-10	Sports car			Rennstrecke Dessau	3.Dessauer Wagen- und Motorradrennen	Practice	Engine failure resulting in crash and got thrown out	
Cliff Haas (USA)	1990-10-20	Stock car	Unknown	Unknown	Lernerville Speedway	150-lap enduro race	Race	Skidded in a turn, was hit by another car and overturned	
Harold Haberling (USA)	1961-06-30	Stock car	1955 Chevrolet	NASCAR Grand National Series	Daytona International Speedway	Daytona 500	Practice	Crashed into wall and rolled	
Jack Habermehl (USA)	1948-06-21	Midget	Kurtis-Offenhauser		Los Angeles Coliseum		Race	Crashed into a wall and flipped	
Enrique Hachmeister (GTM)	1950-05-05	Touring car	Lincoln	Non-championship	Chihuahua (state)	Carrera Panamericana	Race	Rolled while trying to pass another car and was launched through the window	
Akira Hagiwara (JPN)	1986-04-07	Touring car	Mercedes 190E	Japanese Touring Car Championship	Sportsland SUGO		Test	Crashed into a barrier and burst into flames	
Peter Hall (AUS)	2013-10-27	Touring car	Datsun 260Z	Victorian State Circuit Racing Championship	Phillip Island	Unknown	Race	Crashed into a stalled Lamborghini Gallardo	
Hugh Hamilton (GBR)	1934-08-26	Open wheel	Maserati 8CM	Grand Prix season	Bremgarten	Swiss Grand Prix	Race	Left wheel broke, overcorrected the turn, hit a tree, slid and hit another tree	
Shane Hammond (USA)	2008-04-06	Midget		NorthEastern Midget Championship	Thompson International Speedway	Icebreaker 2008	Race	Throttle stuck, tangled with another car and hit a loose banner billboard	
Gregg Hansford (AUS)	1995-03-05	Touring car	Ford Mondeo	Australian Super Touring Championship	Phillip Island Grand Prix Circuit		Race	Lost control exiting turn 1 on second lap of the race, hit earth and tire wall then bounced back out into the path of the car driven by Mark Adderton	
Walt Hansgen (USA)	1966-04-02	Sportscar	Ford GT Mk II A	World Sportscar Championship	Circuit de la Sarthe	24 Heures de Mans - Essais Prelimiaires	Test	Crashed into a barrier that was placed in an escape road	
Dickie Harrell (USA)	1971-09-12	Drag Racing	Chevrolet Vega	AHRA top fuel	Golden Horseshoe Dragway		Race	Crashed into a light pole after the chutes did not open	
László Hartmann (HUN)	1938-05-15	Open wheel	Maserati 4CM		Mellaha	XII Gran Premio de Tripoli	Race	Overturned after the car of Giuseppe Farina clipped his left wheel	
Friday Hassler (USA)	1972-02-17	Stock car	Chevrolet	NASCAR Grand National Series	Daytona International Speedway	Daytona 500	Qualifying	Spun in a pile-up and was hit head-on by another car	
Kouichi Hatakeyama (JPN)	1969-01-26				Fuji Speedway	100 km of Fuji	Race		
Paul Hawkins (AUS)	1969-05-26	Sportscar	Lola T70 Mk3B	British Sportscar Championship	Oulton Park	Tourist Trophy	Race	Lost control, went up an embankment, hit a tree and caught fire	
Bert Hawthorne (IRE)	1972-04-14	Open wheel	Leda-Tui AM29	European Formula Two	Hockenheimring	VI Deutschland Trophäe, Jim Clark Gedächtnisrennen	Practice	Hit by another car and pushed into a guardrail, where he caught on fire	
John Heath (GBR)	1955-04-29	Sports car	HWM-Jaguar	World Sportscar Championship	near Ravenna	Mille Miglia	Race	He came off the wet road before Ravenna and overturned into a ditch. He died the next day from his injuries in a local hospital	
Kara Hendrick (USA)	1991-10-05	Midget		USAC Western States Midget	Cajon Raceway	USAC Western States Midget	Race	Ran over ripple strips, flipped the car, hit a concrete wall, was hit by another car, went over a wall and hit a signboard before it fell on a dirt embankment	
Ralph Hepburn (USA)	1948-05-16	Open wheel	Kurtis 200 Novi	American Automobile Association National Championship	Indianapolis Motor Speedway	Indianapolis 500	Practice	Went into the grass, overcorrected and hit the wall at a 45-degree angle	
Louis Héry (FRA)	1956-07-29	Sports car	Monopole-Panhard X86	Non-championship race	Circuit de la Sarthe	24 Hours of Le Mans	Race	Héry over - turned his car at Maison Blanche and succumbed to his injuries on the way to hospital	
Jim Hickman (USA)	1982-07-31	Open wheel	March-Cosworth	Championship Auto Racing Teams	Milwaukee Mile	Tony Bettenhausen 200	Practice	Slammed into concrete wall whilst having a stuck throttle	
Greg Hodnett (USA)	2018-09-20	Sprint Car	Maxim	World of Outlaws	BAPS Speedway	BAPS 410 Winged Sprint Car Series	Race	Lost control due to mechanical failure in steering and hit a pit entrance wall.	
Bill Hollowell (GBR)	1925-08-09	Open wheel	350cc AJS	Grand Prix season	Circuit de Spa-Francorchamps	Belgian Grand Prix	Race	Crash	
Brooklyn Horan (NZL)	2024-02-25	Rally	Ford Fiesta	Hibiscus Coast Motorsport Club	(New Zealand) Paparoa	Arcadia Road Rallysprint	Rally	Vehicle crashed into a river	
Ted Horn (USA)	1948-10-10	Open wheel	Horn-Offenhauser	American Automobile Association National Championship	DuQuoin State Fairgrounds	Duquoin 100 Mile Race	Race	Equipment failure	
Bill Horstmeyer (USA)	1964-08-22	Open wheel	Kuzma-Offenhauser	United States Auto Club	Illinois State Fairgrounds Racetrack	Tony Bettenhausen Memorial 100	Race	Made contact with the outside wall, flipped violently and caught fire	
Markus Höttinger (FRG)	1980-04-13	Open wheel	Maurer MM80	European Formula Two	Hockenheimring	Jim Clark Rennen	Race	Hit on the head by the tyre of another car	
Jerry Hoyt (USA)	1955-07-10	Open wheel	Offenhauser	American Automobile Association Sprint Car Championship	Oklahoma City State Fairgrounds		Race	Made contact with the fence causing it to turn over	
Anthoine Hubert (FRA)	2019-08-31	Open wheel	Dallara F2 2018	FIA Formula 2 Championship	Circuit de Spa-Francorchamps	FIA Formula 2 - Spa-Francorchamps round	Race	After crashing into a barrier, hit broadside at high speed by Juan Manuel Correa who could not have avoided the collision	
Jim Hughes (USA)	1960-03-26	Sports car	Lotus Elite	FIA GT Cup	Sebring International Raceway	International Grand Prix of Endurance for the Amoco Trophy	Race	The Lotus Elite suffered a brake failure and headed for the escape road, only to found a photographer standing here, complete with tripod. Hughes tried to avoid him, but rolled his little Lotus, striking the photographer and killing them both.	
Denny Hulme (NZL)	1992-10-04	Touring car	BMW M3	Australian Touring Cars	Mount Panorama	Tooheys 1000	Race	Heart attack on Conrod Straight	
Xavier Hutin (SUI)	1988-10-09	Rally car	Renault 5	Swiss Rally Championship	Rallye de Court	Rallye de Court	Race	Crashed into a tree	
Ralph Iacovetta (USA)	1948-07-08	Roadster			Englewood Speedway		Race	Rolled after locking wheels with another car	
Gus Ianacone (USA)	1934-08-05			Garden State Racing Association	Woodbridge Speedway	Five-mile qualifying race	Race	Skidded, spun, hit a guard rail, was hit by another car, was thrown out and run over	
Paco Ibarra (MEX)	1958-03-16	Sports car	Jaguar C-Type		Orizaba (public roads)		Test	Hit a stone and rolled after trying to pass a truck	
Iván Iglesias (BRA)	1973-10-21	Touring car	Chevrolet Opala 4	Rio Grande do Sul State Division 3 Championship	Autódromo Internacional de Tarumã	6a. etapa do Campeonato Gaúcho de Divisão 3	Race	After hitting another car, both went up an embankment, drivers were launched into the air and both slammed to the ground. Iglesias's car exploded upon impact.	
Silvio Ilari (ARG)	1923-03-30	Stock car			Rosario-Santa Fe-Rosario (public roads)		Test	Crash	
Anthony Imbimbo (USA)	1948-07-02	Midget		American Racing Drivers Club Midget Championship	Hinchliffe Stadium	Consolation race	Race	Spun trying to avoid a crash, hit a car and flipped	
Vladimiro Immigrati (ITA)	1997-09-20	Rally car	Fiat Cinquecento Sporting	Campionato Italiano Rally 2 Litri	Rally San Martino di Castrozza	Rally San Martino di Castrozza	7th special stage, Valnevera	Slid off the road, fell down a ravine and crashed against a tree	
Bill Infantino (USA)	1958-08-24	Sports car	Ferrari		Holland Hill Climb	Holland Hill Climb	Practice	Lost control, hit concrete posts, car flipped and driver was thrown out	
Leo Ingebrigtsen (NOR)	1974-06-21	Sprint car			Rocky Mountain Raceway	Copper Cup	Race	Crashed into walls and fuel tank ruptured	
Bill Ingram (USA)	1940-08-14	Midget car		United Midget Racing Association	Balboa Stadium		Race	Crash	
Freddie Inscore (USA)	1946-01-28	Roadster			Sportsman Park		Race	Rolled the car	
Harris Insinger (USA)	1935-09-08		Gilmore Red Lion/Garnant Special		Oakland Speedway	Feature race	Race	Locked wheels with another car and somersaulted several times	
Ralph Ireland (USA)	1911-08-21	Touring car	Staver-Chicago	AAA Championship Car	Elgin Road Course	Elgin National Trophy	Practice	Tire deflated, car veered into a ditch, rear wheel collapsed and the car rolled, crushing him	
Hengkie Iriawan (INA)	1972-04-23	Open wheel			Ipoh Temporary Circuit	3rd BP Kart Prix	Race	Crash	
Kenny Irwin Jr. (USA)	2000-07-07	Stock car	Chevrolet Monte Carlo	NASCAR Winston Cup Series	New Hampshire International Speedway	thatlook.com 300	Practice	Stuck throttle caused him to crash into the wall	
Sonny Irwin (USA)	1992-06-11	Sprint car			Manzanita Speedway		Race	Slid into a wall	
Bobby Isaac (USA)	1977-08-13	Stock car	Chevrolet Nova	NASCAR Late Model Sportsman	Hickory Motor Speedway	Winston 200	Post race	Heat exhaustion	
Masazi Iso (JPN)	1982-03-06	Open wheel		Formula Three	Suzuka Circuit		Practice	Hit while walking away from crash	
Derek Israel (USA)	1997-09-14	Touring car	Datsun 510	Sports Car Club of America Pacific Coast Championship	Sears Point	GT-4 race	Race	Struck by debris from another car	
Buddy Iuliano (USA)	1968-10-05	Drag Racing	Chevrolet	National Hot Rod Association	Coastal Plains Raceway		Race	Car overturned and he was ejected	
Lewis Jackson (USA)	1916-11-18	Open wheel	Marmon	American Automobile Association National Championship	Santa Monica	American Grand Prize	Race	Went off the track, hit several palm trees and a lemonade stand	
Bruce Jacobi (USA)	1983-02-17	Stock car	Chevrolet	Winston Cup Series	Daytona International Speedway	UNO Twin 125 Qualifiers	Qualifying	Lost control, flipped and the roll cage failed; Jacobi died almost four years after the crash	
Alexandre Jacopini (FRA)	2002-05-31	Rally car	Peugeot 206 XS Sport	French Rally Championship	Rallye Alsace-Vosges	French Rally Championship	Race	Crashed heavily after losing control of the car	
Patrick Jacquemart (FRA)	1981-07-09	Touring car	Renault 5 Turbo	International Motor Sports Association	Mid-Ohio Sports Car Course	IMSA private testing	Testing	Crashed into a sandbank	
Seppo Jämsä (FIN)	1974-08-02	Rally car	Mini (Mark I)	World Rally Championship	1000 Lakes Rally	1000 Lakes Rally	Race	Crashed head on into a railing bridge	
Tony Jankowiak (USA)	1990-04-22	Stock car	Pontiac Sunbird	NASCAR Modified	Stafford Motor Speedway	Coors Spring Sizzler 200	Race	Crashed into turn one wall	
Charlie Jarzombek (USA)	1987-03-22	Stock car	Chevrolet Cavalier	NASCAR Modified	Martinsville Speedway	Miller 200	Race	Stuck throttle caused the car to hit inner curb, spin, hit another car, and slam into wall	
Harry Jastrow (USA)	1935-09-15	Midget			Milwaukee Mile		Race	Car locked wheels with another car, flipped and crushed him	
Charly Jellen (Austria-Hungary)	1934-05-07	Sports car	Alfa Romeo 8C		Ingolstadt autobahn		Testing	Went out of control and flipped	
Tyson Jemmett (NZL)	2024-02-25	Rally	Ford Fiesta	Hibiscus Coast Motorsport Club	(New Zealand) Paparoa	Arcadia Road Rallysprint	Rally	Vehicle crashed into a river	
Frank Jenkinson (USA)	1930-07-27	Open wheel	Frontenac-Ford		Jungle Park Speedway		Race	Spindle broke on the right front axle and car went through a fence into the woods	
Paul Jessen (GER)	1925-06-20		Excelsior		Nideggen	III Eifelrundfahrt	Race	Left road, hit tree and was hit by another driver	
Bill Johnson (USA)	1940-08-26		Studebaker		Oakland Speedway		Practice	Went out of control, hit a guardrail and flipped four times	
Blaine Johnson (USA)	1996-08-31	Drag racing		NHRA Winston Drag Racing Series	Indianapolis Raceway Park	Mac Tools US Nationals	Qualifying	Connecting rod broke, cut a tire, sent the car into the left guardrail and came back to hit the right retaining wall	
Jason Johnson (USA)	2018-06-23	Sprint Car	Maxim	World of Outlaws Sprint Car Series	Beaver Dam Raceway	Beaver Dam Raceway	Race	Lost control while racing for lead with Daryn Pittman, flipped out of the track and hit an advertising billboard.	
Niokoa Johnson (USA)	2014-03-23	Mini stock car			Bubba Raceway Park		Time trial	Crash	
Slick Johnson (USA)	1990-02-11	Stock car	Pontiac	ARCA Series	Daytona International Speedway	Daytona ARCA 200	Race	Crashed and was hit by five other cars	
Van Johnson (USA)	1959-07-19	Open wheel	Kurtis - Offenhauser	USAC Championship Car	Williams Grove Speedway	Indianapolis Sweepstakes	Race	Hit by the car of Joe Barzda and flipped	
Hans-Peter Joisten (FRG)	1973-07-21	Touring car	BMW 3.0 CSL	European Touring Car Championship	Circuit de Spa-Francorchamps	Spa 24 Hours "24 Heures de Spa-Francorchamps"	Race	Crashed into guardrail and was hit by the car of Roger Dubos: both drivers died in the crash	
Robert Kaarto (USA)	1966-07-08	Stock car	Unknown	Unknown	Superior Speedway	Unknown	Race	Hit by another car while getting out of his burning car	
Akihiro Kabe (JPN)	1994-05-24	Rally car	Ferrari F40	Unknown	Stuart Highway	Northern Territory Cannonball Run	Race	Lost control, hit two officials at a checkpoint, went onto the gravel and hit a parked Jeep	
Scott Kalitta (USA)	2008-06-21	Drag racing	Toyota Solara Funny Car	NHRA Funny Car	Old Bridge Township Raceway Park	NHRA Lucas Oil Supernationals	Qualifying	Engine exploded, damaged parachutes and crashed at the end of the sand trap	
Ken Kalla (USA)	1983-04-30	Stock car	Buick Regal	ARCA Racing Series	Talladega Superspeedway	Permatex 500	Race	Lost control and crashed into the infield guardrail	
Hiroshi Kazato (JPN)	1974-06-02	Sports car	Chevron B26 - BMW	Fuji Grand Champion Series	Fuji Speedway	Fuji Grand Champion Series, 2nd round, 2nd race	Race	Crashed into the two leaders of the race and caught fire	
Ray Keech (USA)	1929-06-15	Open wheel	Miller "Simplex Piston Ring"		Altoona Speedway	Altoona 200-Mile Race	Race	Crashed into a loose piece of guardrail, rolled several times and caught fire at the bottom of the track	
Al Keller (USA)	1961-11-19	Open wheel	Philipps - Offenhauser "Konstant Hot"		Arizona State Fairgrounds Track		Race	Right wheel got caught in a rut, car spun, rolled broadside several times and landed upside down on a chain link fence	
Csaba Kesjár (HUN)	1988-06-24	Open wheel	Dallara 388	German Formula Three Championship	Norisring	200 Meilen von Nurnberg	Practice	Brakes failed, hit a guardrail, was thrown into the air and landed upside down	
Johnny Key (USA)	1954-06-30	Midget			Cincinnati Race Bowl	American Automobile Association Midget Championship	Race	A broken radius rod caused the car to crash into a wall and he was thrown out of the car: he was then run over by the car of Jack Turner	
Billy Kimmel (USA)	2007-09-02	Sprint car			Williams Grove Speedway		Race	Flipped several times and was hit by another car	
Harold Kite (USA)	1965-10-17	Stock car	Plymouth	Grand National Series	Lowe's Motor Speedway	National 400	Race	Hit broadside by another car	
Ricky Knotts (USA)	1980-02-14	Stock car	Oldsmobile	NASCAR Winston Cup Series	Daytona International Speedway	Daytona 500	Qualifying	Car's hood flew up, car lost control, crashed into the outside wall, was hit by the car of Blackie Wangerin and spun into the inside retaining wall	
Helmut Koinigg (AUT)	1974-10-06	Open wheel	Surtees TS16/3 - Ford	Formula One	Watkins Glen International	United States Grand Prix	Race	Deflated right tire caused the car to crash head-on into crash mesh: the car went straight under the guardrail and he was decapitated	
Dimitris Koliopanos (GRC)	2003-09-27	Rally car	Toyota Yaris	European Rally Championship	ELPA Rally	ELPA rally	Race	Crashed into phone pole and electrical transformer fell on car	
Alexander Nikolaevich Konshin (RUS)	1912-09-22	Open wheel	Opel	Unknown	Elenino-Klin-Elenino	First Russian Automobile Club Moscow 100 km	Race	Explosion	
Ingo Koschmieder (GER)	2014-07-05	Rally car	Mitsubishi Lancer Evo VIII	Unknown	ADAC-Grabfeldrallye	21. Nationalen ADAC-Grabfeldrallye 2014	Rally	Went off the road and into a ditch	
Sandor Kovacs (USA)	2000-05-06	Rally car	Toyota Celica All-Trac	Sports Car Club of America Div ProRally Championship	Sawmill Club Rally	Sawmill Club Rally	Rally stage	Crash	
Otakar Kramsky (CZE)	2015-04-25	Hillclimbing	Reynard K15	European Hill Climb Championship	Rechberg	Grossen Bergpreis von Osterreich am Rechberg	Training	Crashed	
Ferdinand Křehlík (CZE)	2003-09-20	Rally car	Renault Clio	Non-championship	Rallye Světlá	Rallye Světlá	Race	Crashed into a tree	
Jeff Krosnoff (USA)	1996-07-14	Open wheel	Reynard 96l - Toyota	IndyCar	Toronto Road Course	Molson Indy Toronto	Race	Struck the back of another car and was launched into streetpole; also killed a marshal	
Steve King (USA)	2006-08-09	Sprint car			Knoxville Raceway	Knoxville Nationals	Race	Crash	
Krzysztof Krajewski (POL)	1971-07-24	Rally car	Polski Fiat 125p	Non-championship	Rajd Festiwalowy	2. Rajd Festiwalowy	Race	Left the road and crashed	
K.E. Kumar (IND)	2023-01-08	Production car			(India) Madras International Circuit	Indian National Car Racing Championship	Race	Contact with another competitor forced Kumar off the track and through a mesh fence	
Stefano La Motta (ITA)	1951-04-01	Rally car	Alfa Romeo 1900		Giro de Sicilia	XI Giro Automobilistico de Sicilia	Race	Gearbox trouble caused the car to hit the wall of a house	
Piero La Pera (ITA)	1981-10-02	Sports car	Lola T298		Val d'Anapo-Sortino	Val d'Anapo-Sortino - Trofeo Giovanni Oddo Hillclimb	Test	Hit another car, slid, destroyed a small wall, crashed through a gap between two guard rails and went up in flames	
Daniel Ray Laber (USA)	1988-09-19	Unknown	Unknown	Unknown	Magic City Speedway	Unknown	Unknown	Unknown	
Bob Lace (USA)	1963-09-08	Drag Racing			LaPlace Dragway		Race	Went off the track and rolled	
Jim Ladd Jr. (USA)	1964-11-15	Sports car	Austin-Healey 3000	American Road Racing Championship	Riverside International Raceway	American Road Race of Champions, D production sports car race	Race	Spun, hit by another car, went up an embankment and flipped twice	
Jean-Louis Lafosse (FRA)	1981-06-13	Sports Car	Rondeau M379 C Ford Cosworth	World Sportscar Championship	Circuit de la Sarthe	24 Hours of Le Mans	Race	Suspension failure caused the car to slam into the right-hand barrier and come back into the other barrier: the car was completely destroyed	
Hans Laine (FIN)	1970-05-30	Sports Car	Porsche 908	World Sportscar Championship	Nürburgring	1000 km Nürburgring	Qualifying	Car had a blow over, crashed heavily against the pavement and rolled again; the car then caught fire	
Roy Lake (USA)	1938-09-24	Sprint car		American Automobile Association Sprint Car Championship	Allentown Fairgrounds		Race	Crashed into a concrete wall	
Eugene Lambert (USA)	1940-09-29	Stock car			Winchester Speedway			Crash	
Percy E. Lambert (GBR)	1913-10-31		Talbot 25 hp 4.5-liter		Brooklands	Land speed record	Record attempt	Rear tire disintegrated, went up an embankment, rolled and he was thrown out	
Raymond Lambert (SUI)	1961-06-01	Touring car	Ferrari 250GT		Faucille	Course de Côté de La Faucille	Post race	Lost control and rolled	
Catullo Lami (ITA)	1939-08-13	Open wheel	Maserati 6CM		Pescara Circuit	XV Coppa Tito Acerbo	Race	Went off the road and rolled	
Evasio Lampiano (ITA)	1923-06-14	Hillclimb	Fiat 804		Faucille	Course de Côte de La Faucille	Practice	Crashed into a curbstone, went off the road, hit an embankment and overturned	
Jean-Marie Landeau (FRA)	1976-06-01	Rally car	Alpine Renault A110 1800		Ronde limousine	Ronde limousine	Race	Crashed into a tree after going off the road	
Ian Landies (USA)	2000-08-27	Drag Racing	Chevrolet	NHRA Division 1	Cecil County Dragway		Race	Crossed the center line, slid down the guard wall and hit a telephone pole	
Jerry Landon (USA)	1989-04-29	Open wheel			Kalamazoo Speedway		Race	Crashed into another car, went airborne and hit the outside wall	
Jerzy Landsberg (POL)	1979-04-21	Rally car	Opel Kadett GT/E	Polish Rally Championship	Rajd Krakowski (1979 variant)	IV Rajd Krakowski - Krokusy	Rally stage	Crashed when it left the road	
Ron Laney (USA)	2002-01-30	Sprint car		American Sprint Car Series	East Bay Raceway	Fourth King of The 360	Race	Crashed into outside wall, flipped and was hit by another car	
Sigi Lang (LIE)	1970-05-10	Sports car	Porsche 907		Säckingen-Eggberg	Säckingen-Eggberg Bergrennen Hillclimb	Race	Crashed into a tree	
Xu Lang (CHN)	2008-06-16	Pick-up truck	Zhengzhou		Transorientale	Trans-oriental Rally	Marathon race	Tow cable snapped and hit him in the face when he was helping another car	
David Langheinrich (GER)	2006-04-29	Rally car	Trabant 1.1	German Rally Series	Sachsen-Rallye (2006 second special stage, Lichtentanne 1)	40 AvD Sachsen-Rallye	Rally stage	Went off the road, flipped over in a ditch and crashed into a tree	
Jud Larson (USA)	1966-06-11	Sprint car	Dunseth Sprinter	USAC Sprint Division	Reading Fairgrounds Speedway		Race	Crashed into another car, rolled and hit a fence	
Massimo Larini (ITA)	1973-07-21	Touring car	Alfa Romeo GTAm	European Touring Car Championship	Circuit de Spa-Francorchamps	Spa 24 Hours	Race	Lost control, hit the barrier head on and rolled several times	
Jean Larivière (FRA)	1951-06-23	Touring car	Ferrari 212 Export C	Non-championship	Circuit de la Sarthe	24 Hours of Le Mans	Race	Left the track, jumped an embankment and crashed into a barbed wire barricade	
Arsenio Laurel (PHL)	1967-11-19	Touring car	Lotus 41	Unknown	Guia Circuit	XIV Grande Prêmio de Macau	Race	Lost control, crashed into the Mandarin bend and caught on fire	
Ed Lawrence (USA)	1959-03-20	Sports car	Maserati 300S	World Sportscar Championship	Sebring International Raceway	12-Hour Florida International Grand Prix of Endurance for the Amoco Trophy	Practice		
Glenn Leasher (USA)	1962-09-10		Infinity		Bonneville Salt Flats	Land speed record	Record attempt	Car exploded on the flats	
Vern Leech (AUS)	1939-01-02	Open wheel	MG P-type		Lobethal	Australian Grand Prix	Race	Crash	
Jason Leffler (USA)	2013-06-12	Sprint car		Tri-State RaceSaver Series 410 Sprint Car Championship	Bridgeport Speedway	Night of Wings 2013	Qualifying	Front suspension failed, causing the car to hit a wall and flip several times	
Marcel Lehoux (FRA)	1936-07-19	Open wheel	ERA R3B		Deauville	Grand Prix de Deauville	Race	Crashed into the car of Giuseppe Farina, flipped and he was thrown out	
Pierre Levegh (FRA)	1955-06-11	Sports car	Mercedes-Benz 300 SLR	World Sports Car Championship	Le Mans	24 Hours of Le Mans	Race	Crash	
Miroslav Levora (CZE)	2008-06-21	Rally car	Škoda Fabia 2000	Czech Rally Championship	Horácká Rally	XIX Horácká Rally	Rally stage	Went off the road on a jump and hit a tree	
Stuart Lewis-Evans (GBR)	1958-10-19	Open wheel	Vanwall VW57	Formula One	Ain-Diab Circuit	Moroccan Grand Prix	Race	Engine seizure led to crash, caught fire on impact	
Scott Liebler (USA)	1989-10-13	Open wheel	Martini Mk.53-Volkswagen	Formula Atlantic	Road Atlanta	SCCA National Championship Runoffs	Race	Touched rear tire of another car and rolled several times	
Dick Linder (USA)	1959-04-19	Open wheel	Kurtis-Offenhauser	United States Auto Club National Championship	Trenton Speedway	Trenton 100-Mile Race	Race	Crashed through guardrail and rolled over once, breaking his neck	
Butch Lindley (USA)	1985-04-13	Stock car	Chevrolet Camaro	All Pro Super Series	DeSoto Speedway	Keene Brothers Trucking 125	Race	Car hit a wall driver’s side and he hit his head against the wall, dying over six years after the crash in a coma	
Peter Lindner (GER)	1964-10-11	Sports car	Jaguar E-Type Lightweight	World Sportscar Championship	Autodrome de Linas-Montlhéry	1000 km de Paris	Race	Collided with the Abarth-Simca 1300 Bialbero of Franco Patria in the pit lane on lap 83 of the race	
John Lingenfelter (USA)	2002-10-27	Drag Racing	Chevrolet Cavalier	NHRA sports compact	Pomona	Mazda NHRA Sport Compact World Finals	Race	Car lost traction and hit retaining wall at 190 mph- he died over a year later from his injuries	
Kevin Lloyd (GBR)	2004-05-29	Rally car	Renault Clio	Renault Clio Cup	Thruxton Circuit	Renault Clio Cup, 9th Round	Race	Left the road and crashed into a tire wall	
George Christian von Lobkowicz (CZE)	1932-05-22	Open wheel	Bugatti T54	Non-championship	AVUS	Internationales AVUS Rennen	Race	Car swerved, crossed the straight, cut through three trees and hit a railway wall	
Frank Lockhart (USA)	1928-04-25	Land Speed	Stutz Blackhawk Special		Daytona Beach		Record attempt	Car cut tire, lost control, rolled multiple times and was ejected.	
Mark Lovell (GBR)	2003-07-12	Rally car	Subaru WRX	Sports Car Club of America ProRally Championship	Oregon Trail SCCA ProRally	Oregon Trail SCCA ProRally	Rally stage	Hit a tree at high speed	
Jean Lucienbonnet (FRA)	1962-08-19	Open wheel	Lotus 22	Italian Formula Junior Championship	Pergusa	XI Gran Premio Pergusa	Race	Crash	
Tiny Lund (USA)	1975-08-17	Stock car	Dodge	NASCAR Winston Cup Series	Talladega Superspeedway	Talladega 500	Race	Collided with another car and was hit on the driver’s side door by another car	
Stuart Lyndon (NZL)	1985-06-02	Stock car	Ford Thunderbird	Automobile Racing Club of America	Atlanta International Raceway		Race	Crash	
David Ma (HK)	1971-11-19	Open Wheel	Lotus 47	Non-championship	Guia Circuit	Guia Race of Macau	Qualifying	Crashed into a street lamp after losing control	
Dave MacDonald (USA)	1964-05-30	Open wheel	Thompson 63-Ford	USAC Championship	Indianapolis Motor Speedway	Indianapolis 500	Race	Lost control of the car, hit the wall, exploded and was hit by the car of Eddie Sachs	
Herbert MacKay-Fraser (USA)	1957-07-14	Sports car	Lotus Eleven	Formula Two Non-championship	Reims-Gueux	Coupe Internationale de Vitesse	Race	Went off the road, rolled and he was thrown out	
Doc Mackenzie (USA)	1936-08-23	Sports car	Crager	American Automobile Association	Milwaukee Mile	25 mile feature event	Race	Two wheels went into the dirt, causing the car to flip and land on the safety bank	
Duncan Mackenzie (NZL)	1961-04-15	Sports car	Cooper T43	Formula Two	Levin Circuit	April Levin Meeting	Race	Two wheels went into the dirt, causing the car to flip and land on the safety bank	
Don MacTavish (USA)	1969-02-22	Stock car	Mercury Comet	NASCAR Sportsman Division	Daytona International Speedway	Sportsman 300	Race	Crashed into a wall, sheared the front end of the car off and was hit head on by another car	
Marco Magaña (MEX)	1993-05-30	Open wheel		Mexican Formula Three	Autódromo Monterrey	Fórmula Dos championship	Race	Rock launched from another car went into his visor, ran off the track, hit an embankment, went airborne and hit a commentating box	
Jorge Magnasco (ARG)	1958-01-26	Sports car	Maserati 300S	World Sportscar Championship	Autódromo Municipal-Avenida Paz	1000 km Buenos Aires	Race	Car overturned following an accident	
Richard Mainwaring (GBR)	1955-09-18	Sports car	Elva-Climax Mk.1	World Sportscar Championship	Dundrod Circuit	RAC Tourist Trophy	Race	Lost control of his car and crashed off the track	
Jim Malloy (USA)	1972-05-14	Open wheel	Eagle-Offenhauser	United States Auto Club National Championship	Indianapolis Motor Speedway	Indianapolis 500	Practice	Lost control and crashed into the wall at 186 mph	
Andrea Mamé (ITA)	2013-06-30	Sports car	Lamborghini Gallardo LP 570-4	Lamborghini Super Trofeo Europe	Circuit Paul Ricard	Blancpain Race Weekend au Circuit Paul Ricard	Race	Crashed into a wall near the pit lane	
Larry Mann (USA)	1952-09-14	Stock car	1951 Hudson Hornet	NASCAR Grand National Series	Langhorne Speedway		Race	Crashed through a fence and car tumbled over	
Jovy Marcelo (PHI)	1992-05-15	Open wheel	Lola T91/00-Cosworth	IndyCar	Indianapolis Motor Speedway	Indianapolis 500	Practice	Crashed into a wall backwards and hit his head on the cockpit	
Victorio Marchesich (ARG)	1950-02-25	Stock car	Ford V8	Turismo Carretera	Casilda	II Vuelta de Santa Fe	Race	Overturned	
Pierre Maréchal (GBR)	1949-06-26	Sports car	Aston Martin DB2		Circuit de la Sarthe	24 Hours of Le Mans	Race	Lost control of the car, hit an embankment and flipped	
Onofre Marimón (ARG)	1954-07-31	Open wheel	Maserati 250F	Formula One	Nürburgring	German Grand Prix	Practice	Careened down a hill	
Matthew Marker (USA)	2011-04-30	Rally car	Subaru Impreza WRX	Rally America	Olympus Rally	Olympus Rally	Rally special stage 6	Went off the road and hit a tree	
Bobby Marshman (USA)	1964-11-27	Open wheel	Lotus-Ford	USAC Championship	Phoenix International Raceway		Testing	Suddenly turned into the wall and crashed head on	
Eric Martin (USA)	2002-10-09	Stock car	Chevrolet	ARCA Re/Max Series	Lowe's Motor Speedway	EasyCare Vehicle Service Contracts 100	Practice	Hit by the car of Deborah Renshaw on the driver's side	
Emilio Materassi (ITA)	1928-09-09	Sports car	Talbot 700		Monza	Gran Premio d'Italia e d'Europa	Race	Touched the rear wheel of another car, swerved to the left, jumped over a fence and went into the crowd, killing himself and at least 22 spectators.	
Takashi Matsunaga (JPN)	1969-08-10	Sports car	Honda R1300		Suzuka Circuit	12 Hours of Suzuka	Race	Crashed into a guardrail and burst into flames	
Timmy Mayer (USA)	1964-02-28	Open wheel	Cooper T70-Climax	Tasman Cup	Longford Circuit	South Pacific Trophy	Qualifying	Lost control of the car, landed crooked, launched into a group of trees and was thrown out	
Jim Mayers (GBR)	1955-09-18	Sports car	Cooper-Climax T39	World Sportscar Championship	Dundrod Circuit	RAC Tourist Trophy	Race	Hit a concrete pillar and the car immediately burst into a ball of flame. Mayers was killed instantly	
Rex Mays (USA)	1949-11-06	Open wheel	Kurtis 2000 - Offenhauser	American Automobile Association National Championship	Del Mar	Del Mar 100-Mile Race	Race	Hit a rut, flipped, was thrown out and run over	
Stewart McColl (AUS)	2003-08-09	Touring car	Volkswagen Golf	Australian GT Performance Car Championship	Phillip Island Grand Prix Circuit	Australian GT Performance Championship, sixth round	Practice	Crashed head on into a wall at turn 4 after an apparent brake failure	
J. D. McDuffie (USA)	1991-08-11	Stock car	Pontiac	NASCAR Winston Cup Series	Watkins Glen International	Budweiser at The Glen	Race	Lost brakes and a wheel, crashed into a tire barrier at full speed, flipped and landed upside down	
Jack McGrath (USA)	1955-11-06	Open wheel	Kurtis 4000-Offenhauser	American Automobile Association National Championship	Arizona State Fairgrounds	Bobby Ball Memorial Race	Race	Axle broke and car flipped	
Bruce McLaren (NZL)	1970-06-02	Sports car	McLaren M8D-Chevrolet		Goodwood Circuit		Testing	The rear part of the bodywork failed, the car went onto the grass and crashed into a marshal's post	
Bob McLean (CAN)	1966-03-26	Sports car	Ford GT40	World Sportscar Championship	Sebring International Raceway	12 Hours of Sebring	Race	Lost a wheel in a hairpin, rolled several times, crashed into a telephone pole and exploded	
John McVitty (USA)	1956-04-22	Stock car		NASCAR Grand National Series	Langhorne Speedway		Race		
Eric Medlen (USA)	2007-03-19	Drag racing	Ford Mustang Funny car	NHRA POWERade Series	Gainesville Raceway		Testing	Tire went flat and came apart, causing the car to shake violently, which in turn caused his helmet to hit the roll cage	
Russell Mendez (USA)	1975-03-16	Rocket dragster			Gainesville Raceway	Gatornationals	Exhibition run	Crashed into guardrail and was thrown from the car after the chute was deployed without having time to inflate	
Otto Merz (GER)	1933-05-18	Sports car	Mercedes-Benz SSKL		AVUS	Avusrennen	Practice	Car aquaplaned, crashed against a cement milestone, rolled and he was thrown out	
Fausto Meyrat (SWI)	1959-06-07	Sports car	Auto Union RS1080	World Sportscar Championship	Nürburgring	1000 km Nürburgring	Race	Meyrat was being lapped by Stirling Moss, when their cars lightly touched, Meyrat lost control of his car and crashed heavily	
Juha Miettinen (FIN)	2026-04-18	Touring car	BMW 325i	Nürburgring Langstrecken-Serie	(Germany) Nürburgring	2026 ADAC 24h Nürburgring Qualifiers	Race	Multi-car pileup	
Danny Milburn (USA)	1991-02-03	Open wheel		USAC Silver Crown	Phoenix International Raceway	Copper World Classic	Race	Locked wheels with another driver and hit the wall at a flat angle, shattering the right side	
Ken Miles (GBR)	1966-08-17	Sports car	Ford GT J	International Championship for Makes	Riverside International Raceway		Testing	Car went out of control, spun into the infield and went over an embankment, where he was thrown out	
Chet Miller (USA)	1953-05-15	Open wheel	Kurtis FD-Novi	American Automobile Association National Championship	Indianapolis Motor Speedway	Indianapolis 500	Practice	Car went into the dirt, Miller overcorrected and slammed into the wall	
Kenny Minter (USA)	1995-10-29	Modified			Caraway Speedway	Southern Modified Feature	Race	Crashed into a wall	
Takeshi Mitsuno (JPN)	1965-10-10	Sports car		Kansai Sports Car Club	Suzuka Circuit				
Gerhard Mitter (GER)	1969-08-30	Open wheel	BMW-Dornier 269	European Formula Two	Nürburgring	German Grand Prix	Practice	Front suspension failure caused a wheel to fall off, which caused a crash	
Laurenţiu Moldovan (ROM)	2008-07-06	Rally car	Renault Clio	Campionatului Naţional de Viteză în Coastă	Reşiţa Rally	Campionatului Naţional de Viteză în Coastă de la Reşiţa	Race	Crashed into a tree	
Guy Moll (ALG)	1934-08-15	Open wheel	Alfa Romeo Tipo B 2900	Formula Libre	Pescara Circuit	X Coppa Tito Acerbo	Race	Tried to overtake the car of Ernst Henne, lost control of the car, hit the parapet of a bridge, somersaulted and flung Moll out	
Greg Moore (CAN)	1999-10-31	Open wheel	Reynard 99-Mercedes	CART	California Speedway	Marlboro 500	Race	Jumped loose coming off of turn two, became inverted, and crashed top first into concrete barrier	
Tyler Morr (USA)	2012-05-19	Mini stock car		Auburndale Kid's Club	Auburndale Speedway		Race	Crash	
Roberto Mouras (ARG)	1992-11-22	Stock car	Chevrolet Chevy	Turismo Carretera	Lobos	3a Vuelta de Lobos - Premio Policia de la Provincia de Buenos Aires	Race	Crash	
Paul Mulcahy (IRL)	2013-06-30	Rally car	Toyota Starlet	Dunlop National Rally Championship	Carrick-on-Suir Ravens Rock Stages Rally	Carrick-on-Suir Ravens Rock Stages Rally 2013	Rally stage	Crash	
Herbert Müller (SUI)	1981-05-24	Sports car	Porsche 908/03-81 Turbo	World Sportscar Championship	Nürburgring	1000 km Nürburgring	Race	Crash	
John Mulligan (USA)	1969-09-01	Drag racing	Chrysler	NHRA top fuel	Indianapolis Raceway Park	NHRA U.S. Nationals	Race	Crash	
Eiki Muramatsu (JPN)	1990-03-23	Open wheel	Mooncraft MC041B-Mugen	All-Japan Formula 3000 Championship	Fuji Speedway		Testing	Crash	
Doc Murphy (USA)	1956-04-14	Sports car	Jaguar XK120	SCCA	Marlboro Motor Raceway		Racing school	Left the road and rolled onto roof	
Jimmy Murphy (USA)	1924-09-15	Open wheel	Miller	American Automobile Association National Championship	New York State Fairgrounds	Syracuse 150-Mile Race	Race	Crash	
Luigi Musso (ITA)	1958-07-06	Open wheel	Ferrari Dino 246	Formula One	Reims	French Grand Prix	Race	Tire deflation	
Bobby Myers (USA)	1957-09-02	Stock car	Oldsmobile	NASCAR Grand National Series	Darlington Raceway	Southern 500	Race	Crashed into a stalled car and rolled	
Lyle Nabbefeldt (USA)	1973-05-26	Stock car	Chevrolet Corvette		Wisconsin Dells Motor Speedway		Qualifying	Stuck throttle caused the car to crash into the wall	
Kenichi Nagai (JPN)	1966-05-03	Touring car			Fuji Speedway			Gust of wind picked up the car and was thrown over the barriers	
Michał Nahorski (POL)	1959-07-22	Rally car	Triumph TR3A	European Rally Championship	Adriatic Rally		Race	Went off the road, went down a ravine, hit a tree roof first and caught fire	
Osamu Nakajima (JPN)	2012-10-21	Sports car	Nissan Fairlady Z33	Super Taikyu Series	Suzuka Circuit	Super Taikyu Suzuka	Race	Crashed into a barrier on the first turn	
Masaharu Nakano (JPN)	1973-11-23	Sports car	Chevron B23	Grand Champion Series	Fuji Speedway	Fuji Victory 200 Kilometers	Race	Spun out, crossed the track, was hit by other cars and the car exploded	
Théodore Namont (FRA)	1930-05-25	Hillclimb			Course de Côte à Fontainebleau		Hillclimb	Went off the road and somersaulted	
Bill Nansen (USA)	1970-08-13	Drag racing			Island Dragway		Qualifying	Crashed into a ramp, flipped and hit a wall	
Walter Narr (GER)	1969-05-17				Harz	Harz-Bergpreis	Practice	Crashed	
Mike Nazaruk (USA)	1955-05-01	Sprint car	Nyquist-Offenhauser		Langhorne Speedway		Race	Veered into the wall, swerved, hit the wall again, went partway through it, rolled several times and caught fire: he was thrown out of the car	
Biagio Nazzaro (ITA)	1922-07-15	Open wheel	Fiat 804		Strasbourg	Grand Prix de l'Automobile Club de France	Race	Threw a rear wheel, hit a tree and rolled several times	
David Ndahura (UGA)	1970-03-28	Rally car	Peugeot 404	International Championship for Manufacturers	Safari Rally	18th East African Safari Rally	Race	Drowning	
Carrie Neal (USA)	1997-07-25	Drag racing		NHRA National Championship Drag Races	Sears Point	NHRA Autolite Nationals	Warm-up	Throttle stuck	
Harry Neale (AUS)	1959-02-06	Midget			Claremont Speedway		Race	Crashed into another car, rolled several times, belt broke and was thrown out	
Bill Neapolitan (USA)	1932-08-28				Woodbridge Speedway		Race	Crash	
Gérard Nectoute (FRA)	1982-05-01	Hillclimb	March 742		Cagnotte	Course de Côte de Cagnotte	Race	Skidded, went off the road and crashed	
Darren Needham (GBR)	2004-08-08	Touring car	Mini Cooper S	John Cooper Challenge	Silverstone		Race	Crashed into another car and into a barrier	
George Neely (USA)	1959-10-10	Stock car			Mansfield Motorsports Speedway		Post-race	Ran into the rear tire of another car, went up an embankment, the shoulder straps broke and this caused him to hit his helmet on the rollcage	
Bruno Nefe (GER)	1978-09-15	Touring car	Trabant 601	East Germany Touring Car Championship	Frohburger-Dreieck	DDR Tourenwagen Meisterschaft	Race	Crashed and somersaulted	
John Negley (USA)	1953-10-24	Sports car	Allard-Chrysler	Sports Car Club of America National	Turner Air Force Base	Strategic Air Power Trophy Race	Practice	Car rolled over	
Jean-Louis Negro (FRA)	1981-09-13	Hillclimb			Gourdon Caussols	Course de Côte de Gourdon Caussols		Struck by another car while in the parking lot	
Gary Neice (USA)	1991-05-04	Stock car	Oldsmobile	NASCAR Busch Series	South Boston Speedway	Carquest 300	Race	Heart attack	
Edmont Nelson (USA)	1957-05-12	Sports car	Ferrari 335S	World Sports Car Championship	Guidizzolo	Mille Miglia	Race	Alfonso de Portago's front tire exploded. He lost control of the car; hit a telephone pole, jumped over a brook, then the car bounced back on to the road, slid over the road, spinning, and ended up, wheels down, in a brook at the other side of the road. Besides de Portago, his navigator Nelson, ten spectators – among them five children – died	
Norman Nelson (USA)	1963-08-31				Hartford Speedway Park		Race	Rolled over	
John Nemechek (USA)	1997-03-16	Truck	Chevrolet	Craftsman Truck Series	Homestead-Miami Speedway		Race	Lost control and crashed into the wall on the driver's door	
Kenny Nemire (USA)	1957-07-06	Stock car	Ford convertible	ARCA Racing Series	Toledo Raceway Park		Race	Crashed into retaining wall, slid, rolled and was ejected	
Nikolai Nenov (BUL)	1993-05-08	Rally car	Nissan Sunny GTI-R	European Rally Championship	Rally Zlatni Piassatzi	24th International Rally Zlatni Piassatzi	Race	Crashed into a rock after going off a road and down an embankment	
Guy Nève (BEL)	1992-06-28	Sportscar	Porsche 911 Carrera	Belgian Procar	Chimay Street Circuit		Race	Clipped another car, slid, rolled several times and caught fire	
Roger Newell (USA)	1987-05-23	Open wheel		California Racing Association - sprint car	Ascot Park	Salute to the Indy 500	Race	Slid and crashed into a wall	
Eddie Nicholson (USA)	1946-06-09			International Motor Contest Association	Milwaukee Mile	Barney Oldfield Race	Race	Crashed through a fence and overturned	
Gilfert Nielson (USA)	1969-04-09	Drag racing			Orange County International Raceway		Race	Thrown out of the car	
Joop van Nieuwenhuijzen (NED)	1960-01-18	Rally car	Alfa Romeo Giulietta TI	European Rally Championship for Drivers	Rallye de Monte-Carlo	29ème Rallye de Monte-Carlo	Race	Crashed into a truck	
Mark Niver (USA)	2010-07-11	Drag racing		NHRA	Seattle International Raceway	Northwest Nationals	Post-race	Parachute ripped backwards into netting, buckling the chassis into the cockpit	
Hob Noel (USA)	1964-10-11	Stock car			Eldora Speedway		Race	Hit wall, bounced back onto the track, ran over a competitor's wheel and flipped over the track wall	
Art Noll (USA)	1932-07-10				Ho-Ho-Kus Speedway		Practice		
Eric Nord (USA)	1980-04-27	Kart			Talladega Super Speedway			Crash	
Frank Norris (USA)	1922-09-16	Sports car			Arlington Park		Race	Crashed through a fence	
Marcelo Núñez (MEX)	2004-08-01	Stock car	Pontiac Grand Prix	Desafío Corona	Autódromo Monterrey	Desafío Corona, 4ta. fecha	Race	Swerved to avoid hitting a wall, went into a gravel trap, went onto track again and was hit by another car	
Jack Nunnally (USA)	1926-01-15				Arizona State Fairgrounds		Practice	Crashed through a fence and overturned	
Hank Nykaza (USA)	1957-08-24	Midget car		United States Auto Club National Midget Championship	Milwaukee Mile		Race	Rear wheels locked up, car skidded, jack-knifed, seat belt snapped and he was thrown out	
Pat O'Connor (USA)	1958-05-30	Open wheel	Kurtis Kraft-Offenhauser	USAC Championship	Indianapolis Motor Speedway	Indianapolis 500	Race	Hit the car of Jimmy Reece, flipped, skidded, hit a wall and caught fire	
Eddie O'Donnell (USA)	1920-11-25	Open wheel	Duesenberg	American Automobile Association National Championship	Beverly Hills Speedway	Beverly Hills 200-Mile Race	Race	Crashed into the car of Gaston Chevrolet	
Kieth O'dor (GBR)	1995-09-10	Touring car	Nissan Primera	Super Tourenwagen Cup	AVUS	AVUS Rennen	Race	Equipment failure caused the car to hit a wall and spin: he was then hit by the car of Frank Biela on the driver's door	
Hitoshi Ogawa (JPN)	1992-05-24	Open wheel	Mugen Honda	Japanese F3000	Suzuka Circuit	Million Card Cup Race round two	Race	Crashed into the car of Andrew Gilbert-Scott, flew into the gravel trap and hit a pole supporting a fence	
Ken O'Neill (USA)	1965-08-07	Sportscar	Merlyn-Climax	Sports Car Club of America	Candlestick Park	Third annual Candlestick Park Road Races	Qualifying	Flipped over a guard rail	
Charles Ogle (USA)	1985-12-15	Stock car	Pontiac Sunbird		Daytona International Speedway		Testing	Car flipped over	
Rance Olds (USA)	1923-06-23	Open wheel	Curtiss		Roby Speedway		Qualifying	Crash	
Greg Olhava (USA)	2000-10-14	Drag racing		National Hot Rod Association	Indianapolis Raceway Park		Pre-race	Car suddenly accelerated, crashed and rolled over	
Gigi Olivari (ITA)	1957-04-14	Sports car	Maserati A6		Giro di Sicilia	XVII Giro Automobilistico di Sicilia	Race	Skidded, crashed into a concrete wall and burst into flames	
Senkichi Omura (JPN)	1974-04-07	Open wheel	F2000 Brabham		Suzuka Circuit		Testing	Crashed into a guard rail	
Vladislav Ondřejík (CZE)	1977-07-10	Touring car	Škoda 130RS	East Germany Touring Car Championship	Sachsenring	Sachsenring Rennen	Race	Crashed into two other cars and into a concrete pole	
Henri Oreiller (FRA)	1962-10-21	Sports car	Ferrari 250 GTO	World Sportscar Championship	Autodrome de Montlhéry	1000 km de Paris	Race		
Jim O'Rourke (USA)	1970-06-12	Stock car	Tire blew out at 100 mph, causing it to flip	Modified super stock car	Sportsman Park		Qualifying	Fire	
Rodney Orr (USA)	1994-02-14	Stock car	Ford Thunderbird	Winston Cup Series	Daytona International Speedway	Daytona 500	Practice	Car spun, lifted into the air and hit the outside retaining wall and catch fence at 175 mph	
Pete O'Shea (IRL)	2011-08-13	Open wheel	Swift Cooper SC-10 Ford	Formula Ford	Castle Combe Circuit	Castle Combe August Cup	Qualifying	Heart attack	
Justin Owen (USA)	2023-04-08	Sprint car	Unknown	USAC Sprint Car Championship	Lawrenceburg Speedway		Qualifying	Owen's car went on two wheels entering turn 3, hitting the wall causing the car to flip several times	
Skip Pabis (USA)	2005-05-23	Modified	Unknown	International Motor Contest Association	Afton Speedway	Unknown	Race	Rolled over	
Jim Packard (USA)	1960-10-01	Midget	Unknown	United States Auto Club National Midget Championship	Fairfield	Unknown	Qualifying	Steering broke, car flipped over a wall and hit a tree	
Don Padia (USA)	1951-09-16	Midget	Unknown	Rocky Mountain Midget Racing Association	Englewood Speedway	Unknown	Race	Locked wheels with another driver and flipped into a parking lot	
Jim Pagel (USA)	1997-05-01	Stock car	Unknown	Unknown	Wisconsin International Raceway	US96/Goldstar Racing Supply Fox River Racing Club event	Qualifying	Spun out and hit a wall	
Giancarlo Pagliuca (ITA)	1997-05-18	Kart	Unknown	Kart	Sarno	Non-championship race	Race	Hit another competitor and rolled as the kart ran over him	
Pierre Pagnibon (FRA)	1953-06-07	Sportscar	Ferrari 340MM Touring Spyder#0268AM	Non-championship	Hyères	Les Douze Heures d'Hyères	Race	Lost control of car in the rain, crashed and was ejected	
Riccardo Paletti (ITA)	1982-06-13	Open wheel	Osella FA1C-Cosworth	Formula One	Montreal	Canadian Grand Prix	Race	Crashed into the stalled car of Didier Pironi and caught fire	
Carlos Pardo (MEX)	2009-06-14	Stock car	Ford Fusion	NASCAR Corona Series	Puebla		Race	Hit by another car and slammed into a containment wall	
Michael Park (GBR)	2005-09-18	Rally car	Peugeot 307 WRC	World Rally Championship	Wales Rally		Race	Crashed into a tree	
Neal Parker (USA)	2010-06-11	Drag racing		NHRA Full Throttle Drag Racing Series	Old Bridge Township Raceway Park	United Association NHRA SuperNationals	Qualifying	Parachute did not deploy, went through a gravel trap, went through safety nets and hit water barrels	
J.G. Parry-Thomas (GBR)	1927-03-03	Land speed record	Babs		Pendine Sands			Car slid, flipped, landed on its wheels and caught fire	
Franco Patria (ITA)	1964-10-11	Sports car	Abarth-Simca 1300 Bialbero	World Sportscar Championship	Autodrome de Linas-Montlhéry	1000 km de Paris	Race	Hit by the Jaguar E-Type lightweight of Peter Lindner in the pit lane on lap 83 of the race	
Carlo Pedrazzini (SWI)	1934-04-22	Open wheel	Maserati 8CM		Circuito Pietro Bordino	Circuito di Alessandria Gran Premio Pietro Bordino	Race	Crashed into a parapet on a bridge, somersaulted, hit a wall and he was thrown out	
Stan Perry (USA)	2007-05-04	Stock car			Spartan Speedway		Race	Crashed and had a heart attack	
Ronnie Peterson (SWE)	1978-09-10	Open wheel	Lotus 78 - Cosworth	Formula One	Monza	Italian Grand Prix	Race	Hit by the car of James Hunt, spun into a wall and caught fire: died of a fat embolism the next day	
Adam Petty (USA)	2000-05-12	Stock car	Chevrolet Monte Carlo	NASCAR Busch Series	New Hampshire International Speedway	Sta-Green 200	Practice	Stuck throttle caused the car to crash into the turn 3 wall	
Russell Phillips (USA)	1995-10-06	Stock car	Oldsmobile Cutlass	NASCAR Limited Sportsman Division	Lowe's Motor Speedway	Winston 100 NASCAR Sportsman Series	Race	Was hit by another car and launched roof first into the wall, while trying to avoid a spinning car. The roof and roll cage were sheared away exposing Phillps' body to the fence and a caution light. This has been deemed the most gruesome crash in NASCAR history.	
Wanda Phillips (USA)	2007-06-30	Stock car			Lonesome Pine International Raceway		Race	Crash	
Wolfgang Piwco (GER)	1956-04-29	Touring car	Mercedes-Benz 300 SL	World Sportscar Championship	Montemarciano	Mille Miglia	Race	Car hit a wall, killing him instantly	
Georg Plasa (GER)	2011-07-10	Hillclimbing	BMW 134 - Judd V8	European Hill Climb Championship	Rieti-Terminillo	Coppa Bruno Carotti	Hillclimb	Hit a hill, flipped and was ejected	
Carlos Polanco (CHI)	1990-11-25	Touring car	Nissan Sunny	Monomarca Nissan Sunny (Chile)	Roca Roja		Race	Tagged by another car, flipped violently and was ejected	
Art Pollard (USA)	1973-05-12	Open wheel	Eagle-Offenhauser	USAC Championship	Indianapolis Motor Speedway	Indianapolis 500	Practice	Crashed hard into the outside wall, flipped over multiple times and caught fire	
Mark Porter (NZL)	2006-10-06	Touring car	Holden Commodore	Fujitsu V8 Supercar Series	Mount Panorama Circuit	Bathurst 1000	Race	Crash into wall coming to a stop sideways mid track to be hit in the drivers door by a following car	
Andre Pouschol (FRA)	1954-05-02	Touring car	Citroën 15 Six	World Sportscar Championship	Vigenza	Mille Miglia	Race	Crashed into signpoint	
Donald Pratt (USA)	1989-09-17	Stock car	Chevrolet Cavalier	NASCAR Modified	Pocono Raceway	Sunoco Race of Champions 250	Race	Crashed broadside into a wall	
Talmadge Prince (USA)	1970-02-19	Stock car	Dodge Daytona	NASCAR Grand National Series	Daytona International Speedway	Twin 125	Race	T-Boned broadside by another car	
Tom Pryce (GBR)	1977-03-05	Open wheel	Shadow DN8	Formula One	Kyalami	South African Grand Prix	Race	Hit in the head by a fire extinguisher	
Willy Quevedo (ARG)	2007-03-02	Drag Racing	De Carlo	Unknown	Luján de Cuyo	Las Picadas de Lujan de Cuyo	Exhibition	Engine exploded and debris hit him	
Jimmy Quick (USA)	1965-07-16				Devil's Bowl Speedway		Race	Crushed inside car after crash	
Gene Quillin (USA)	1947-06-08	Stock car		Ohio Speedway Association	Ravenna Fairgrounds		Race	Crashed through a guard rail and was impaled on it	
Del Quinn (USA)	2001-04-28	Stock car		Northern California Modifieds Association	Kings Speedway		Post-race	Heart attack	
Joe Quinn (USA)	1948-07-14	Stock car			Owosso Speedway		Race	Hit by a car after crash	
Joe Quinn (IRE)	1954-08-28	Sports car	Quinn Special V8	Formula Libre	The Curragh	Wakefield Trophy and O'Boyle Trophy Handicap	Race	Crashed into spectator enclosure and rope wrapped around his neck	
Kenny Quinn (USA)	1924-10-18				Clearfield Driving Park		Race	Crashed through a fence	
Manuel Quintana (CUB)	1980-03-21	Sports car	Porsche 911	World Challenge for Endurance Drivers	Sebring International Raceway	28th Annual Coca-Cola 12 Hours of Sebring International Grand Prix of Endurance	Qualifying	Crashed and somersaulted	
Esteban Quispitupa (PER)	1999-10-10	Rally car	Toyota	Peruvian National Rally Championship	Caminos del Inca	XXIX Gran Premio Nacional de Carretreras "Caminos del Inca"	Rally Stage	Crashed against a rock to avoid crashing into the sea	
Eddie Raasch (USA)	1930-06-22			International Motor Contest Association	Milwaukee Mile		Race	Crashed into two stalled cars and was ejected	
Leslie Rabik (USA)	1940-07-04	Stock car	Jalopy	Unknown	Hawkeye Downs Speedway	Jalopy race	Race	Blinded by dust, car lost control and crashed through a fence: a jagged piece of fence severed his jugular vein	
Ian Raby (GBR)	1967-07-30	Open wheel	Brabham BT14-Ford Lotus LF	European Formula Two	Circuit Park Zandvoort	Grote Prijs van Zandvoort	Race	Crash	
Paul Rademacher (USA)	1969-07-04	Midget	Unknown	United Auto Racing Association	Waukegan Speedway	Unknown	Race	Smashed against a concrete wall, flipped and skidded on the track for 50 feet	
Barry Radford (AUS)	2004-11-13	Stock car	Holden Commodore	Sprintcar Association of Tasmania Nu-Tech Systems Sprintcar Series - Super Sedan class	Cranes Combined Carrick Speedway	Super Sedans, first round, second heat race	Race	Clipped by another car and slammed head-on into the pit lane wall	
Boris Radichkov (BUL)	1977-07-08	Rally car	VAZ-2101	European Rally Championship	Rajd Polski	Rajd Polski	Rally stage	Left the road, fell into a ravine and hit a tree with the driver-side door	
Hans Rager (MAR)	1958-10-19	Sports car	Triumph	Non-championship	Ain-Diab Circuit	2 Heures de Casablanca	Race	Car skidded and turned over	
Adrian Răspopa (ROM)	2021-09-04	Rally car	Škoda Fabia R5	Romanian Rally Championship	Hadâmbu	Raliul Iașului	Race	Crashed into a bridge	
Roland Ratzenberger (AUT)	1994-04-30	Open wheel	Simtek S941-Ford	Formula One	Imola	San Marino Grand Prix	Qualifying	Crashed into the wall head on due to a front wing failure	
Tracy Read (USA)	1987-07-25	Stock car	Chevrolet	Automobile Racing Club of America	Alabama International Motor Speedway	ARCA Permatex 500	Race	Crashed into another car and hit an earthen embankment	
Jimmy Reece (USA)	1958-09-28	Open wheel	Kurtis 500G-Offenhauser	USAC Championship	Trenton Speedway	Trenton 100	Race	Touched a dirt part of the track, went up the track, hit a fence and was thrown out	
Lionel Régal (FRA)	2010-08-15	Hillclimbing	Reynard 01L-Mugen Honda	European Hill Climb Championship	Saint-Ursanne - Les Rangiers	67ème Course de Côte Internationale Saint-Ursanne - Les Rangiers	Hillclimb	Slid and crashed into a tree	
Klaus Reisch (AUT)	1971-09-12	Sports car	Alfa Romeo Tipo 33	Interserie	Autodromo Enzo e Dino Ferrari	6 Hours of Imola	Race	Spun, crashed backwards into the wall, burst into flames and was thrown out	
Marcel Renault (FRA)	1903-05-24	Sports car	Renault		Paris-Madrid	Paris-Madrid - VIII Grand Prix de l'Automobile Club de France	Marathon race	Wheel got stuck in a rut and crashed into a tree	
Tony Renna (USA)	2003-10-22	Open wheel	G-Force-Toyota	Indy Racing League	Indianapolis Motor Speedway		Testing	Spun, went airborne into the catch fence and disintegrated	
Dario Resta (ITA)	1924-09-02	Sports car	Sunbeam		Brooklands		Record attempt	Tire puncture caused the car to go backwards through a fence and catch fire	
Peter Revson (USA)	1974-03-22	Open wheel	Shadow DN3 Ford-Cosworth	Formula One	Kyalami	South African Grand Prix	Testing	Lost control, slid, crashed into the barriers and caught fire	
Andrew Rhodes-Anderson (AUS)	2024-11-23	Sports car	Holden Commodore (VN)	Improved Production Racing Association of Victoria	(Australia) Phillip Island Grand Prix Circuit	Island Magic	Race	Medical emergency	
Gene Richards (USA)	1982-07-31	Stock car	Chevrolet Monte Carlo	Automobile Racing Club of America	Alabama International Speedway	Talladega 200	Race	Crashed into inside wall, went across track and hit other wall	
Red Riegel (USA)	1966-06-11	Sprint car		USAC Sprint Division	Reading Fairgrounds		Race	Crashed into the car of Jud Larson and both cars flipped over a wall	
Jochen Rindt (AUT)	1970-09-05	Open wheel	Lotus 72C Ford-Cosworth DFV	Formula One	Monza	Italian Grand Prix	Qualifying	Right front brakeshaft broke apart, causing the car to veer left and hit the guardrail: the car went under the guardrail and he was pulled into the cockpit	
Fireball Roberts (USA)	1964-05-24	Stock car	Ford Galaxie	NASCAR Grand National Series	Charlotte Motor Speedway	World 600	Race	Hit the wall trying to avoid another wreck from Junior Johnson and Ned Jarrett, rolled over and burst into flames; died 39 days later	
Floyd Roberts (USA)	1939-05-30	Open wheel	Wetteroth-Offenhauser	American Automobile Association National Championship	Indianapolis Motor Speedway	Indianapolis 500	Race	Made contact with another car, left the track and crashed into a tree	
Johnny Roberts (USA)	1965-07-24	Stock car	Ford		Lincoln Speedway		Race	Crash	
Ford Robinson (USA)	1954-11-23	Sports car	Ferrari 375 Plus Pinin Farina	World Sportscar Championship	Carrera Panamericana	Carrera Panamericana	Race	While driving at a speed of 180 mph down the Tehuantepec straight, the differential bearing seized and locked up the rear wheels, sending the car down a slope	
James Robinson (USA)	1988-02-07	Stock car	Pontiac Trans Am		Phoenix International Raceway	Skoal Bandit Copper World Classic	Race	Tagged by another car, crashed broadside into a wall. Was hospitalized until he died 7 years later from pneumonia	
George Robson (GBR)	1946-09-02	Open wheel	Wetteroth-Offenhauser	American Automobile Association National Championship	Lakewood Speedway	Atlanta 100-Mile National Championship Auto Race	Race	Crash	
Chuck Rodee (USA)	1966-05-14	Open wheel	Watson-Ford	United States Auto Club	Indianapolis Motor Speedway	Indianapolis 500	Qualifying	Slammed into the wall broadside and hit his head against the barrier	
Gonzalo Rodríguez (URU)	1999-09-11	Open wheel	Lola B99/00	CART	Laguna Seca	Honda Grand Prix of Monterey	Qualifying	Overshot the braking point, car left the track slamming into a concrete barrier at the entry of the Corkscrew corner and flipping over the wall.	
Pedro Rodríguez (MEX)	1971-07-11	Sports car	Ferrari 512M Berlinetta	Interserie	Norisring	200 Meilen von Nürnberg	Race	Crash	
Ricardo Rodríguez (MEX)	1962-11-01	Open wheel	Lotus 24-Climax	Formula One	Magdalena Mixchuca	Mexican Grand Prix	Practice	Crash	
Tony Roper (USA)	2000-10-13	Stock pick-up truck	Ford truck	NASCAR Craftsman Truck Series	Texas Motor Speedway	O'Reilly 400	Race	Tagged by another car and went head on into a wall. Died the next day from neck injures which restricted the blood supply to his brain	
Bernd Rosemeyer (GER)	1938-01-28		Auto Union		Frankfurt-Darmstadt autobahn		Record attempt	Lost control at 275 mph and was thrown from the car	
Louis Rosier (FRA)	1956-10-07	Sports car	Ferrari 750 Monza	Sportscar, non-championship	Linas-Montlhéry	Coupe du Salon de l'Auto de Paris	Race	Crashed in wet conditions, sustained head injuries and died 3 weeks later in hospital	
Darrell Russell (USA)	2004-06-27	Drag Racing		NHRA top fuel	Gateway International Raceway	Sears Craftsman Nationals	Race	Mechanical failure caused his car to disentegrate, he died when one of his tires hit him on the head	
Joe Russo (USA)	1934-06-10	Open wheel			Langhorne Speedway		Race	Crash	
Peter Ryan (USA)	1962-07-01	Open wheel	Lotus 22-Ford	Formula Junior	Reims	Coupe Internationale de Vitesse des Juniors	Race	Crash	
Eddie Sachs (USA)	1964-05-30	Open wheel	Halibrand-Ford	USAC Championship	Indianapolis Motor Speedway	Indianapolis 500	Race	Crashed into the flaming car of Dave MacDonald and caught fire	
Rolandas Šaduikis (LTU)	2007-10-20	Rally car	Honda Civic		Ralis Kauno Ruduo	Ralis Mega – Kauno Ruduo 2007	Race	Crash	
F. Saisse (FRA)	1954-05-02	Touring car	Citroën 15 Six	World Sportscar Championship	Vigenza	Mille Miglia	Race	Car driven by Andre Pouschol, crashed into signpoint	
Laura Salvo (ESP)	2020-10-10	Rally	Peugeot	Peugeot Rally Cup Iberia	Vidreiro Centro	Rally Vidreiro Centro	Rally stage	The car was being driven by Miguel Socias (Salvo co-driving) when it careered off the road and hit another vehicle.	
Sergio Santander (CHI)	1987-09-26	Open wheel	Juan Larroquette JL-04 - Renault	Chilean Formula 3 Championship	Las Vizcachas	Round 8	Race	Crashed into another car, both veered off the track and hit the inside pit wall	
Shane Savage (AUS)	2023-09-08	Track day	Holden Torana	Powercruise	(Australia) Queensland Raceway	Powercruise Queensland Raceway	Timed session	Lost control, spun into the infield and rolled multiple times	
Swede Savage (USA)	1973-05-30	Open wheel	Eagle-Offenhauser	USAC National Championship	Indianapolis Motor Speedway	Indianapolis 500	Race	Car veered off of track, hit wall and caught fire: died in hospital 33 days later from kidney infection	
Ludovico Scarfiotti (ITA)	1968-06-08	Hillclimbing	Porsche 910/68 Bergspyder	European Hillclimb Championship	Roßfeld-Höhenring-Straße	Internationaler Alpen-Bergpreis Berchtesgaden	Race	Went off-road, fell into a ravine, crashed into trees and was thrown out	
Harry Schell (USA)	1960-05-13	Open wheel	Cooper-Climax	Non-championship Formula One	Silverstone	BRDC International Trophy	Practice	Car got sideways in the mud, flipped over, slid through a safety barrier and hit a wall of breeze blocks, which fell on the car	
Bill Schindler (USA)	1952-09-20	Open wheel		AAA Eastern Championship	Allentown Fairgrounds		Race	Hit a loose wheel from another car, crashed through a fence, went down an embankment and crashed into a ticket booth	
Jo Schlesser (FRA)	1968-07-07	Open wheel	Honda RA302	Formula One	Rouen-Les-Essarts	French Grand Prix	Race	Lost control of the car, slammed into an embankment, flipped and burst into flames	
Terry Schoonover (USA)	1984-11-11	Stock car	Chevrolet Monte Carlo SS	NASCAR Winston Cup Series	Atlanta International Raceway	Atlanta Journal 500	Race	Crashed into a dirt bank	
Harlan Schwartz (USA)	2004-05-08	Rally car	Alfa Romeo 8C 2300	Unknown	Mille Miglia	XXII Mille Miglia Storica	Rally	Tried to overtake a car, both cars were hit by a car coming in the opposite direction; the Alfa rolled, hit a tree and went into a ravine	
Giuseppe Scotuzzi (ITA)	1953-11-19	Sports car	Ferrari 375 MM Pininfarina Berlinetta	World Sportscar Championship	Tehuantepec, Mexico	Carrera Panamericana	Race	Tire burst causing the car to leave the road at about 240 km/h, he was the navigator	
Archie Scott Brown (GBR)	1958-05-19	Sports car	Lister-Jaguar	Sportscar, non-championship	Circuit de Spa-Francorchamps	Grand Prix de l'Automobilclub de Francorchamps	Race	Car left the track, flipped and burst into flames	
Richard Seaman (GBR)	1939-06-25	Open wheel	Mercedes-Benz W154	AIACR European Championship	Circuit de Spa-Francorchamps	Belgian Grand Prix	Race	Car went off the road, crashed into a tree and caught fire	
Tsutomu Seki (JPN)	2013-10-27	Touring car	Nissan Sunny	Japan Classic Car Association	Tsukuba Circuit	JCCA Classic Car Festival - TS Cup class race	Race	Car went out of control and crashed into the barrier at the last corner	
Ayrton Senna (BRA)	1994-05-01	Open wheel	Williams FW16-Renault	Formula One	Imola	San Marino Grand Prix	Race	Struck by debris after crash	
Jim Shampine (USA)	1982-09-04	Stock car	Chevrolet Cavalier	NASCAR Modified	Oswego Speedway	Oswego Modified 200	Race	Crashed in turn 2, struck in driver's door by Ron Shepherd	
Melvin D. Shaw (USA)	2017-07-02	Sports car	Chevrolet Camaro	Trans-Am Series	(United States) Brainerd International Raceway	2017 Brainerd Trans-Am Series round	Practice	Crashed in turn 3, possible health issue	
Neil Shanahan (IRE)	1999-05-31	Open wheel	Van Diemen RF99/Solus-Ford	British Formula Ford Championship	Oulton Park	Round 5 of the 1999 British Formula Ford Zetec Championship	Race	Crash	
Lee Shepherd (USA)	1985-03-11	Drag racing	Chevrolet Camaro	NHRA pro stock	Ardmore Raceway		Race	Crash	
Jo Siffert (SWI)	1971-10-24	Open wheel	BRM P160	Formula One, non-championship	Brands Hatch	World Championship Victory Race	Race	Crashed due to having a broken suspension and the car broke into flames. Siffert only suffered a leg fracture in the initial crash but died due to smoke inhalation as firemen took over five minutes to even start fighting the flames	
Wolf Silvester (GER)	2013-06-22	Touring car	Opel Astra OPC	Veranstaltergemeinschaft Langstreckenpokal Nürburgring	Nürburgring	44th Adenauer ADAC Trophy	Race	Heart attack	
Allan Simonsen (DEN)	2013-06-22	Sports car	Aston Martin Vantage GTE	FIA World Endurance Championship	Circuit de la Sarthe	24 Hours of Le Mans	Race	Crashed into a wall broadside	
Buren Skeen (USA)	1965-09-13	Stock car	Ford	NASCAR Grand National Series	Darlington Raceway	Southern 500	Race	Hit broadside by another car	
Jiří Skoupil (CZE)	2011-04-08	Rally car	Citroën C2 S1600	Czech Rally Championship	Mogul Rallye Šumava Klatovy	46. Mogul Rallye Šumava Klatovy 2011	Rally	Crashed into a tree after losing control	
Gordon Smiley (USA)	1982-05-15	Open wheel	March 82C-Cosworth	USAC Gold Crown Championship	Indianapolis Motor Speedway	Indianapolis 500	Qualifying	Lost control and crashed head on into a wall at 200 mph	
Larry Smith (USA)	1973-08-12	Stock car	Mercury	NASCAR Grand National Series	Talladega Super Speedway	Talladega 500	Race	Spun and hit the turn 1 wall, causing him severe head injuries	
William Smith (GBR)	1955-09-18	Sports car	Connaught AL/SR	World Sportscar Championship	Dundrod Circuit	RAC Tourist Trophy	Race	Lost control of his car following another accident and hit Jim Mayers	
William Snell (USA)	1956-08-19	Sports car	Triumph TR3	Sports Car Club of America	Arcata Airport		Race	Crash	
Moisés Solana (MEX)	1969-07-27	Hillclimb	McLaren M6B-Chevrolet	Non-championship hillclimb	Valle de Bravo-Bosencheve		Race	Went wide on a bend and hit a concrete trimming at the edge of the road, overturning the car, landing on top of him and caught fire	
Raymond Sommer (FRA)	1950-09-10	Open wheel	Cooper Mark IV	Non-championship Formula 3	Cadours	Grand Prix de l'Haute Garonne	Race	Steering failed and his car overturned at a corner	
Gustavo Sondermann (BRA)	2011-04-03	Pick-up truck	Chevrolet Montana	Chevrolet Montana Cup	Autódromo José Carlos Pace		Race	Hit a wall then was hit by 2 other cars	
Lester Spangler (USA)	1933-03-30	Open wheel	Miller	AAA Championship Car	Indianapolis Motor Speedway	Indianapolis 500	Race	Hit another car and rolled, ejecting him and his riding mechanic	
Mike Spence (GBR)	1968-05-07	Open wheel	Lotus 56-Pratt & Whitney	USAC National Championship	Indianapolis Motor Speedway	Indianapolis 500	Practice	Hit in the head by a tire	
Rafael Sperafico (BRA)	2007-12-09	Stock car	Chevrolet Astra	Brazilian Light Stock Cars Championship	Autódromo José Carlos Pace		Practice	Hit a tire barrier then was hit by another car, completely destroying it	
Alan Stacey (GBR)	1960-06-19	Open wheel	Lotus 18-Climax	Formula One	Circuit de Spa-Francorchamps	Belgian Grand Prix	Race	Hit in the face by a bird and crashed into a wall	
Antonio Stagnoli (ITA)	1953-11-19	Sports car	Ferrari 375 MM Pininfarina Berlinetta	World Sportscar Championship	Tehuantepec, Mexico	Carrera Panamericana	Race	Tire burst causing the car to leave the road at about 240 km/h	
Robbie Stanley (USA)	1994-05-26	Sprint car	Hoffman	USAC Sprint Car Championship	Winchester Speedway		Race	Hit hard by another car	
Bernd Stelzig (GER)	1968-04-28	Sports car	Porsche 911	Deutsche Automobil Rundstrecken Meisterschaft	Norisring	Norisringrennen	Race	Lost control of the car and hit a steel bridge pillar	
Dave Steele (USA)	2017-03-25	Sprint car		Southern Sprint Car Shootout Series	Desoto Speedway	Unnamed race	Race	Flipped over competitor's rear tire and into retaining wall cockpit-first	
Mike Stevens (CAN)	2013-08-03	Stock car	Chevrolet Impala SS	Parts For Trucks Pro Stock Tour	Oyster Bed Speedway	Exit Realty PEI 100	Race	Car flipped; Stevens unbuckled his head and neck restraints while upside-down and landed on his head	
Max Stewart (AUS)	1977-03-19	Open wheel	Lola T400-Chevrolet	Rothmans International Series	Calder Park Raceway	Calder F5000 race	Qualifying	Exiting first turn went to overtake another car and ran under the rear of an unseen slower car	
Tom Stewart (USA)	1980-07-05	Open wheel	March 80A-Ford Cosworth	SCCA-CASC Formula Atlantic Championship	Lime Rock Park		Warm-up	Crash	
Rolf Stommelen (FRG)	1983-08-24	Sports car	Porsche 935 replica	International Motor Sports Association	Riverside International Raceway	Los Angeles Times Grand Prix	Race	Car’s rear wing broke due to mechanical failure at 190 mph (306 km/h). The car became uncontrollable, slammed against a concrete wall, somersaulted and caught fire.	
Gerhard Süß (GER)	1997-07-05	Rally car	Opel Kadett C		ADAC-Grabfeldrallye	4. Nationalen ADAC-Grabfeldrallye 1997	Race	Left the road, crashed into a tree and fell into a ravine	
Henry Surtees (GBR)	2009-07-19	Open wheel	Williams JPH1-Audi	FIA Formula Two Championship	Brands Hatch	Brands Hatch Formula Two round	Race	Hit in the head by an untethered wheel causing severe head injuries	
Karel Švec (CZE)	2009-05-30	Rally car	Mitsubishi Lancer Evo IX	Czech Rally Open Cup	Rallye Posázaví	XII Rallye Posázaví	Race	Went off the road and crashed into a tree	
Bob Sweikert (USA)	1956-06-17	Sprint car	Kuzma-Offenhauser	USAC Sprint Car Championship	Salem Speedway		Race	Left the road, went airborne and hit the ground roof first	
Giovanni Tabacchi (ITA)	1931-06-05	Sports car	Bugatti T35C	Unknown	Rome Urbe Airport	VII Gran Premio Reale di Roma	Practice	Lost control, went over a small wall and rolled down a hill	
Shingo Tachi (JPN)	1999-03-11	Sports car	Toyota Supra GT500	All Japan Grand Touring Car Championship	TI Circuit		Testing	Technical failure caused the car to crash into a tire wall	
Eldridge Tadlock (USA)	1941-05-11	Stock car	Unknown	Unknown	High Point Motor Speedway	Unknown	Qualifying	Right rear wheel came off, causing car to flip several times and he was pinned beneath it	
Toru Takahashi (JPN)	1983-10-23	Sports car	MCS 4 - BMW	Fuji Grand Champion Series	Fuji Speedway	Fuji Masters 250 Kilometres	Race	Spun out, flipped into the air and crashed into the wall roof first, also killed a spectator	
Dennis Taylor (GBR)	1962-06-02	Open wheel	Lola Mk5 - Ford	Formula Junior (non-championship)	Circuit de Monaco	IV Grand Prix de Monaco Junior	Race	Skidded, crashed into a tree and bounced off a barrier coming out of the tunnel	
John Taylor (GBR)	1966-08-07	Open wheel	Brabham BT11 - BRM	Formula One	Nürburgring	German Grand Prix	Race	Ran into the back of Jacky Ickx's car, crashed and caught fire	
Marshall Teague (USA)	1959-02-11	Open wheel	Kurtis-Kraft KK500D "Sumar Streamliner Special"		Daytona International Speedway		Testing	Crashed into wall, flipped and he was thrown out still attached to the seat	
Ain Teppo (EST)	2007-09-28	Rally car	Lada Riva		Mulgi Ralli	Mulgi Ralli	Race	Crashed into a stack of wood	
Tommy Thompson (USA)	1978-09-23	Open wheel	Lola T324	USAC Mini-Indy Series	Trenton International Speedway		Race	Crashed into a wall with John Barringer. Thompson succumbed to his injuries on 28 September 1978, Barringer made a full recovery.	
Jerry Titus (USA)	1970-08-08	Sports car	Pontiac Firebird	Trans Am Series	Road America		Practice	Mechanical failure caused crash	
Henri Toivonen (FIN)	1986-05-02	Rally car	Lancia Delta S4	World Rally Championship	Tour de Corse	Tour de Corse	Race	Plunged down ravine after hitting small wall, crashed into a tree and caught fire	
Warren Tope (USA)	1975-07-05	Sports car	McLaren M8E		Pontiac, Michigan, street course	Wide Track II	Race	Rear halfshaft broke, cutting the rear brake line, which caused the car to go under an Armco barrier	
Lars-Erik Torph (SWE)	1989-01-23	Rally car	Lancia Delta Integrale	World Rally Championship		Monte Carlo Rally	Race	Spectating when the Lancia Delta Integrale of Alessandro Fiorio-Luigi Pirollo went off the road, overturned and killed him and his co-driver	
Josu Ugarte (SPA)	2006-10-08	Hillclimbing	Reynard F.3000	Campeonato Vasco de Montaña [Basque Hillclimb Championship]	Urraki	XXIV Subida a Urraki	Race	Crashed backwards into a tree	
Pierre Ugnon (FRA)	1953-04-26	Sports car	Jaguar C-Type	World Sports Car Championship	Mille Miglia	XX Mille Miglia	Race	Car rolled in a field and he was thrown out	
Václav Uher (CZE)	1949-09-24	Open wheel	Maserati 6CM	Formula One, non-championship	Brno	Velká Cena Československa	Practice	Crash	
Tojiro Ukiya (JPN)	1965-08-20	Sports car	Dome Karasu		Suzuka		Testing	Crashed into a lamppost and was thrown from car	
Jerry Unser Jr. (USA)	1959-05-17	Open wheel	Kurtis Kraft	USAC Championship	Indianapolis Motor Speedway	Indianapolis 500	Practice	Crashed in turn 4 and died of injuries and burns	
Íñigo Uría (ESP)	2001-03-17	Rally car	Renault Megane	Basque Rallysprint Championship	Rallysprint Ikasberri	II Rallysprint Ikasberri	Race	Broken neck in a minor crash	
Sherwin Utphall (USA)	1965-06-14				Eau Claire Raceway		Post-race	Heart attack	
Miloš Vágner (CZE)	2014-11-09	Rally car	Škoda Fabia S2000	Czech Rally Championship	Rally Krkonoše	Rally Krkonoše	Rally stage	Went out of control and hit the wall of a house	
Germán Vagni (ARG)	1954-08-29	Open wheel	Oldsmobile	Mecánica Nacional Fuerza Libre	Las Rosas (Circuito de Tres Lagunas)	XI Premio Las Rosas de Santa Fe - Copa Vito J. Requena	Race	Went off the track and overturned	
Ants Vaino (RUS)	1971-05-30	Open wheel	Estonia 15M	USSR Championship	Borovaya	USSR Championship, round 1	Race	Crash	
Roy Valentine (USA)	1950-06-25	Sprint car	Unknown	Mississippi Valley Automobile Racing Association Big Car Championship	Mendota Fairgrounds	Unknown	Race	Lost control in a curve, hit another car, went over a fence and crashed into a tree	
Dilano van 't Hoff (NED)	2023-07-01	Open wheel	Tatuus–Alfa Romeo F3 T-318	Formula Regional European Championship	(Belgium) Circuit de Spa-Francorchamps	FREC Spa-Francorchamps round	Race	Aquaplaned in wet conditions on the Kemmel Straight, spun and was hit broadside by Adam Fitzgerald	
Achille Varzi (ITA)	1948-07-01	Open wheel	Alfa Romeo 158	Grand Prix season	Bremgarten	Swiss Grand Prix	Practice	Lost control, hit a barrier and flipped	
César Vera-Abad (PER)	2005-07-17	Stock car	BMW M3	Peruvian National Championship	Lima (Paseo de Los Héroes Navales)	I Copa Alcalde de Lima	Race	Lost control of the car and crashed into a wall	
Jim Victor (USA)	2018-07-27	Open wheel	Van Diemen RF01	SCCA Formula Continental	Road America	Cat's Meow Majors	Practice/test session	Crashed into the barriers in "the kink" after high-speed suspension failure	
Mathieu Vidal (FRA)	2000-09-18	Open wheel	Coloni CN1	Open Telefonica by Nissan	Circuit de Barcelona-Catalunya		Pre-season test	Crashed into the barriers	
Gilles Villeneuve (CAN)	1982-05-08	Open wheel	Ferrari 126 C2	Formula One	Zolder	Belgian Grand Prix	Qualifying	Crashed into the car of Jochen Mass, barrel-rolled and was thrown out	
Martin Vodehnal (CZE)	2006-10-27	Rally car	Audi Quattro	Non-championship	Rally Střela	Rally Střela	Race	Crashed into a fence	
Rich Vogler (USA)	1990-07-21	Sprint car			Salem Speedway	ESPN Thunder	Race	Hit another car and crashed into a fence	
Wolfgang von Trips (FRG)	1961-09-10	Open wheel	Ferrari 156	Formula One	Monza	Italian Grand Prix	Race	Car went sideways, went up a hill, flipped and he was thrown out, the crash also killed 15 spectators.	
Bill Vukovich (USA)	1955-05-30	Open wheel	Kurtis Kraft	Formula One	Indianapolis Motor Speedway	Indianapolis 500	Race	Hit by the car of Johnny Boyd, went over the back wall and hit a civilian car	
Bill Vukovich III (USA)	1990-11-25	Sprint car			Mesa Marin Raceway		Practice	Crashed into a wall	
Billy Wade (USA)	1965-01-05	Stock car	Mercury	NASCAR Grand National Series	Daytona International Speedway		Testing	Blown tire caused the car to crash: the seat launched the driver into the steering wheel, killing him	
Honoré Wagner (LUX)	1965-05-23	Sports car	Alfa Romeo Giulia TZ	World Sportscar Championship	Nürburgring	1000 km Nürburgring	Race	Went off the road and went into a ravine	
Kevin Ward Jr. (USA)	2014-08-09	Sprint car		Empire Super Sprint Series race	Canandaigua Motorsports Park		Race	Hit by Tony Stewart while standing on track	
Paul Warwick (GBR)	1991-07-21	Open wheel	Reynard 90D	British Formula 3000	Oulton Park	Gold Cup	Race	Steering locked, crashed into the barriers and was thrown out	
Akira Watanabe (JPN)	1968-10-10			Fuji Series - Champions Class	Fuji Speedway				
Don Watson (AUS)	1994-09-30	Touring car	Holden Commodore VP	CAMS Group 3A	Mount Panorama Circuit	Tooheys 1000	Practice	Front left brake rotor failure in practice resulted in the car losing brakes and steering, it hit an earth and tire wall in the chase at high speed	
Joe Weatherly (USA)	1964-01-19	Stock car	Mercury	NASCAR Grand National Series	Riverside International Raceway	Motor Trend 500	Race	Hit a wall hard and hit his head against the barrier	
Jonathan Weisheit (USA)	2025-08-17	Open wheel	Formula Enterprises	Formula Race Promotions	Summit Point Motorsports Park	Championship Series Race	Race	Racing accident	
Col Wenzel (AUS)	2013-02-25	Touring car	Alfa Romeo Alfetta GTV	Alfa Romeo Owners Club of Australia Italian Challenge Race Series	Lakeside International Raceway	Top Gear Classic Race Meeting	Race	Throttle stuck which caused the car to go off the track and crashed into an embankment	
Barry Westmoreland (GBR)	2008-04-13	Open wheel	Lotus 20	Historic Sports Car Club	Cadwell Park		Race	Heart attack	
Dan Wheldon (GBR)	2011-10-16	Open wheel	Dallara IR-05	IndyCar Series	Las Vegas Motor Speedway	IZOD IndyCar World Championship	Race	Involved in a 15 car crash on the 11th lap of the final race of the season. Wheldon's car was launched into the air and impacted the catch fencing cockpit first, causing fatal head injuries. The race was abandoned after news of Wheldon's death was announced.	
Nolan White (USA)	2002-10-17				Bonneville Salt Flats		Land Speed Record	Equipment failure	
Peter Whitehead (GBR)	1958-09-21	Rally car	Jaguar 3.4 litre	Non-championship race	Tour de France	Tour de France	Race	Crashed off a bridge into a 30-foot ravine at Lasalle, near Nîmes after overturning twice, with his half-brother Graham Whitehead at the wheel. Graham escaped with serious but not life-threatening injuries, while Peter was killed instantly.	
Howdy Wilcox (USA)	1923-09-04	Open wheel	Duesenberg	American Automobile Association National Championship	Altoona Speedway	Altoona 200 Mile Race	Race	Crash	
Bob Wilder (USA)	1953-05-22	Sports cars	Allard J2X Le Mans	SCCA National Sports Car Championship	Bridgehampton	Bridgehampton Sports Car Races	Qualifying	The car struck a depression in the road after crossing a bridge at high speed and rolled over, crushing his head	
Don Williams (USA)	1979-02-17	Stock car	Chevrolet Chevelle	NASCAR Late Model Sportsman	Daytona International Speedway	Sportsman 300	Race	Hit driver side on by another car. Died 10 years later in a coma	
Roger Williamson (GBR)	1973-08-29	Open wheel	March 731 - Ford	Formula One	Circuit Park Zandvoort	Dutch Grand Prix	Race	Asphyxiation from fire and smoke from crash	
Tim Williamson (USA)	1980-01-12	Stock car	Chevrolet Camaro	NASCAR Grand American	Riverside International Raceway	NASCAR Stock Car Products 300	Race	Crash	
Justin Wilson (GBR)	2015-08-24	Open wheel	Dallara DW12	IndyCar Series	Pocono Raceway	ABC Supply 500	Race	Struck in the head by debris from the crashed car of Sage Karam	
Jean-Pierre Wimille (FRA)	1949-01-28	Open wheel	Simca-Gordini 10GCT15		Palermo	Gran Premio General Perón	Practice	Crash due to spectators crossing the track	
Manfred Winkelhock (FRG)	1985-08-11	Sports car	Porsche 962C	World Sportscar Championship	Mosport International Raceway	Budweiser GT 1000km	Race	Crashed hard into turn 2 wall	
Tyler Wolf (USA)	2012-10-27	Sprint car			Calistoga Speedway	75th Anniversary Race	Race	Crash	
John Woolfe (GBR)	1969-06-14	Sports car	Porsche 917	World Sportscar Championship	Circuit de la Sarthe	24 Hours of Le Mans	Race	Lost control of his car, crashed hard into the barrier, flipped and caught fire. He was thrown out of the cockpit and died on his way to hospital	
Mike Wright (USA)	1968-07-07	Sports car	Morgan	Sports Car Club of America National	Cotati Raceway		Race	Equipment failure	
Marshall Wuertley (USA)	1976-06-27	Drag Racing			I-55 Raceway		Time trial	Crash	
Louis Wusterhausen (USA)	1972-10-08	Stock car	Chevrolet Camaro	Automobile Racing Club of America	Texas World Speedway	Royal Triton ARCA	Race	Crash	
Hannes Wustinger (AUT)	1994-10-15	Touring car	BMW M3	Austrian Touring Car Championship	Zeltweg Air Base	Saisonfinale Österreichring	Race	Crash	
Norbert Wylie (USA)	1924-09-14				Hawthorne Race Course	Dreamland Derby	Post-race	Crash	
Adam Wyllie (GBR)	1965-07-16	Open wheel	Brabham BT16	Formula Libre	Dunboyne	Leinster Trophy	Practice	Hit by another car, struck an electricity transmission ESB pole and somersaulted into a field	
Cornelius Wynja (USA)	1951-05-13			Bell Timing Association	El Mirage Lake		Land speed record	Crash	
Howard Wysong (USA)	1964-06-13	Drag Racing		American Hot Rod Association	U.S. 30 Dragway		Race	Crash	
Aray Xavier (BRA)	1987-04-05	Open wheel	Van Diemen RF86 Ford	Snetterton Formula Ford 1600 Championship	Snetterton Motor Racing Circuit	Champion of Snetterton FF1600 series	Race	Hit by another car and flipped onto barriers upside down	
Manny Xuereb (AUS)	1972-08-06	Touring car	Ford Anglia SRC		Oran Park Raceway		Race	Crashed into pit lane	
Floyd Yaeger (USA)	1960-07-29	Sprint car		International Motor Contest Association	Scotland County Speedway		Race	Went over a bank, plunger over and rolled	
Phillip Yau (HK)	2012-11-16	Touring car	Chevrolet Cruze		Guia Circuit	59th Macau Grand Prix	Qualifying	Clipped a barrier on the inside of a turn and smashed into a wall on the outside of the turn	
Takahashi Yokoyama (JPN)	1997-10-19	Open wheel	Dallara F396	All-Japan Formula Three Championship	Fuji Speedway		Race	Crashed into another car, went airborne and hit the gantry carrying a signboard	
Nam Yee Yong (SIN)	1963-09-02	Sports car	Jaguar D-Type	Formule Libre, non-championship	Johore	Johore Grand Prix	Race	Crashed into a wall, car broke in two and the front fell off of a cliff to the beach below	
Danny Young (USA)	1995-07-19	Sprint car	Unknown	World of Outlaws	Knoxville Speedway	Sprint car event	Race	Flipped nine times	
Don Young (USA)	1985-09-22	Drag Racing	Unknown	International Hot Rod Association	Bristol Dragway	Fall Nationals	Race	Crashed into guard rail and support post and was thrown out	
Joe Young (USA)	1987-02-13	Stock car	Chevrolet Cavalier	Charlotte/Daytona Dash Series	Daytona International Speedway	Komfort Koach 200	Race	Hit by another car after a multi-car crash	
Leopoldo Olvera Zabado (ARG)	1954-11-23	Touring car	Chevrolet Bel Air	World Sportscar Championship	Carrera Panamericana	Carrera Panamericana	Race	Accident	
Dave Zachary (USA)	1968-09-22	Drag Racing	Cadillac Eldorado		Blue Grass Dragway		Race	Rolled over and the roll cage collapsed	
Danilo Zaffari (BRA)	1971-07-04	Rally car	Dodge Dart		Rally da Integração Nacional	I Rally da Integração Nacional	Rally	Crash	
Vincenzo Zaffino (ITA)	1982-09-19	Kart			Cosenza	1° Memorial Gilles Villeneuve - Circuito di Cosenza	Post-qualifying	Crashed head-first into a metal tube from a barrier at 81 mph	
Ron Zanolli (USA)	1987-08-30	Drag Racing	Chevrolet Monza		Lebanon Valley Dragway		Race	Went out off control, flipped, hit a tree and landed in a creek bed	
Jan Kees Zantvoort (NED)	1996-06-08	Rally car	Nissan Micra		Eindhoven Luik Eindhoven Rally	33rd Eindhoven Luik Eindhoven Rally	Race	Crashed into a tree	
Carlos Zatuszek (ARG)	1937-10-08	Stock car	Mercedes-Benz SSK		Casilda	Gran Premio Ciudad de Casilda	Practice	Slid on the track, hit a fence and was thrown out	
Elliott Zborowski (GBR)	1903-04-01	Hillclimbing	Mercedes		La Turbie	Course de Côte Nice-La Turbie	Race	Crashed into a small rock and was thrown out	
Louis Zborowski (GBR)	1924-10-19	Open wheel	Mercedes M72/94		Monza	Italian Grand Prix	Race	Went off the road and crashed into a tree	
Henryk Ziemski (POL)	1977-05-13	Rally car	Polski Fiat 125p	Rajdowe Samochodowe Mistrzostwa Polski	Rajd Kormoran	X. Rajd Kormoran	Race	Crashed into a tree trying to avoid a bus	
Paolo Zuccarelli (ITA)	1913-06-13	Open wheel	Peugeot EX3	Grand Prix season, non-championship	Amiens	French Grand Prix	Testing	Crashed into a horse cart and was thrown out	
Manus Kelly (IRL)	2019-06-23	Rally car	Hyundai i20 R5	Irish Tarmac Rally Championship	Donegal International Rally	Donegal International Rally 2019	Rally stage	Crash	
Attilio Zuppini (ITA)	1966-03-13	Touring car	Fiat Abarth 850 TC		Monza	Coppa Fisa 1966	Race	Hit a barrier and somersaulted several times	
Bob Zwemke (USA)	1975-09-20	Modified	Unknown	NASCAR super modifieds	San Jose Speedway	Weekly race	Practice	Rear axle broke and tore open the fuel tank	

== See also ==
- List of deaths by motorcycle crash
- List of people who died in traffic collisions
- List of accidents and disasters by death toll for sporting events
- List of fatal accidents in motorboat racing
- List of 24 Hours of Le Mans fatalities
- List of Turismo Carretera fatalities
- List of NASCAR fatalities
- List of IndyCar fatalities
- List of Formula One fatalities
- List of Dakar Rally fatal accidents
- List of sports officials who died while active (including those in motorsport)
- Death of Dale Earnhardt
