= Nolan White =

- Born: Nolan White; February 26, 1931; San Diego, California, U.S.
- Died: October 20, 2002 (aged 71); Salt Lake City, Utah, U.S.
- Occupation: Breaking 400mph speed record

Nolan Ray White (February 26, 1931 – October 20, 2002) was an American land speed record race car driver and one of the few people to pilot a wheel-driven piston engined vehicle in an official sanctioned run in excess of 400 MPH.

== Speed record ==
White broke the 400 MPH barrier at the Bonneville Salt Flats in September 1990, achieving the mark with the average of the required two direction run completed within one hour.

== Death ==
White died on October 20, 2002, at the age of 71 in Salt Lake City after being injured in an accident at the speed flats when his parachute failed after clocking a one-mile run at 422 MPH.
