= Neil Shanahan =

Irish race car driver

Neil Anthony Shanahan (June 28, 1979 – May 31, 1999) was an Irish racing driver. He was killed at the age of 19 in a crash on the fifth round of the British Formula Ford Championship at Oulton Park. The incident happened in a three-car collision on the approach to Clay Hill. The Formula Ford championship, which Shanahan was contesting, is one of the most important training grounds for young drivers pursuing a career in motorsport, and the vast majority of current Formula One drivers, including all the Britons currently at the top level, competed in previous versions of the category.

Shanahan began go-karting at the age of 13. By the time he was 16, he was runner-up in the Formula A1 Karting Championship of 1996. In 1997 Shanahan was the winner of the Formula Ford DHL Star of Tomorrow (winning 10 out 11 races that season), winner of the Phoenix Park Motor Races, and awarded the Dunlop Sexton Trophy for Driver of the Year. In 1998 Shanhan won the Ford of Ireland Championship, was awarded the Barney Manley Trophy for the Best Irish International Driver, alongside the Dunlop Sexton Trophy for the second year running.

In 1999, Shanahan signed for the Van Diemen Works Team in the United Kingdom to compete in the British and European Formula Ford Championship. The Van Diemen Formula Ford team was the starting point for many successful drivers - the most notable being Ayrton Senna and Eddie Irvine. That year Shanahan was also named Motorsports News "Race Ace" for his overtaking maneuvers at Brands Hatch, in the fourth round of the season.

The Neil Shanahan Memorial Trophy was commissioned by Ford UK in 1999; the porcelain trophy is awarded annually to the winner of the World Finals of the Formula Ford Festival at Brands Hatch. The Neil Shanahan Perpetual Trophy "The Chequered Flag" was commissioned by the Shanahan family, designed and made in silver and slate, the Perpetual Trophy is awarded annually to the Irish Junior Karting Champion.

In 2019, Off The Ball produced a documentary on his life and career as part of a series The Classic.
