= Lloyd Ruby =

American racing driver (1928–2009)

- Nationality: (United States) American
- Born: Richard Lloyd Ruby; January 12, 1928 Wichita Falls, Texas, U.S.
- Died: March 23, 2009 (aged 81) Wichita Falls, Texas, U.S.

Championship titles
- 1965, 1966 24 Hours of Daytona Winner; 1966 12 Hours of Sebring Winner

Awards
- Indianapolis Motor Speedway Hall of Fame (1991); Motorsports Hall of Fame of America (2015)

Champ Car career
- 176 races run over 20 years
- Years active: 1958–1977
- Best finish: 3rd – 1964
- First race: 1958 Bobby Ball Memorial (Phoenix)
- Last race: 1977 Indianapolis 500 (Indianapolis)
- First win: 1961 Tony Bettenhausen 200 (Milwaukee)
- Last win: 1970 Trenton 200 (Trenton)
Wins	Podiums	Poles
7	29	8

Formula One World Championship career
- Active years: 1960–1961
- Team(s): Watson, Lotus
- Entries: 2
- Championships: 0
- Wins: 0
- Podiums: 0
- Career points: 0
- Pole positions: 0
- Fastest laps: 0
- First entry: 1960 Indianapolis 500
- Last entry: 1961 United States Grand Prix

Richard Lloyd Ruby (January 12, 1928 – March 23, 2009) was an American racecar driver who raced in the USAC Championship Car series for 20 years, achieving seven victories and 88 top-ten finishes. He also had success in endurance racing, winning the 24 Hours of Daytona twice, the 1966 12 Hours of Sebring and the 1966 World Sportscar Championship.

== Racing career ==
Ruby raced in the USAC Championship Car series in the 1958–1977 seasons, with 177 career starts, including the Indianapolis 500 from 1960 to 1977. He achieved 88 top-ten finishes, and seven victories. His best finish at Indy was third, in 1964. In 1966, he led the Indy 500 for 68 laps.

Ruby also had two endurance racing victories in the 24 Hours of Daytona (1965–1966), both times partnering with Ken Miles. Ruby and Miles teamed up to win the 1966 12 Hours of Sebring and the 1966 World Sportscar Championship. Ruby was scheduled to drive in the 1966 24 Hours of Le Mans, however he was forced to withdraw due to spinal injuries suffered in a plane crash. A year later, he teamed with Denny Hulme in a Ford GT 40 Mk IV for the 1967 24 Hours of Le Mans. Ruby played a key role in Ford Motor Company's GT40 program in the mid-1960s. He also raced in the 1961 United States Grand Prix.

=== Indianapolis 500 ===
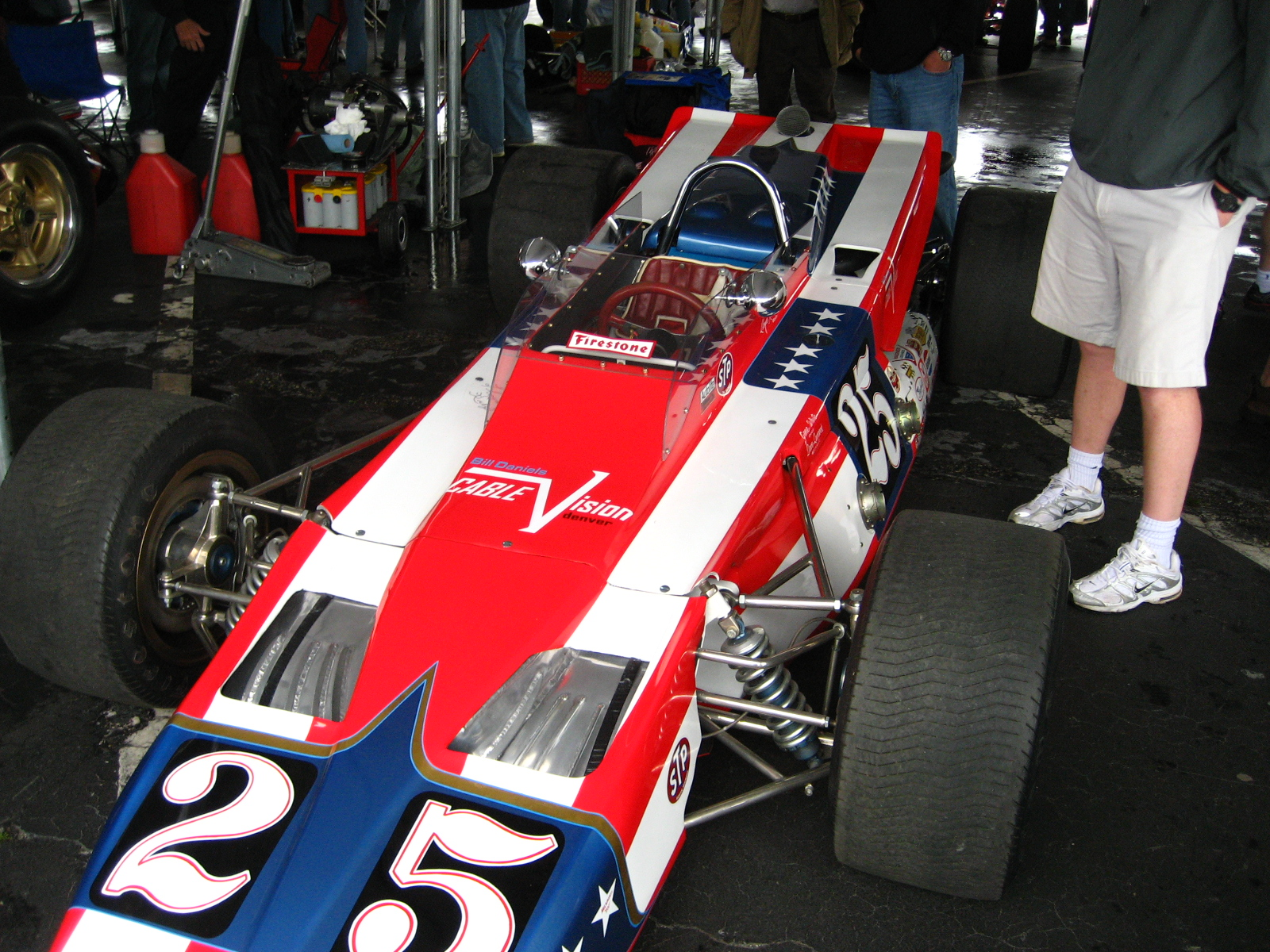
The Mongoose-Offenhauser car Ruby drove in the 1970 Indianapolis 500

Despite a Championship Car career replete with success, Ruby is probably best remembered for his many misfortunes at the Indianapolis 500. His biography, written by Ted Buss in 2000, was titled, Lloyd Ruby: The Greatest Driver Never to Win the Indy 500. Ruby led the race in five different years, for a total of 126 laps, however, his best finish at Indianapolis was third, in 1964. His only other top-five finish at Indy came in 1968. In 1991, he was inducted into the Auto Racing Hall of Fame.

Perhaps Ruby's most notorious hard-luck bout at Indy came in 1969. With race leader Mario Andretti experiencing overheating problems, Ruby was in a strong position to score a victory. During a pit stop around the halfway point, a crew member motioned Ruby to pull away too soon. The refueling nozzle was still engaged in the car's left saddle tank, and as Ruby dropped the clutch, the car lurched forward. The nozzle ruptured a hole in the gas tank, ending Ruby's day.

== Death ==
Ruby died in 2009 at the age of 81 in his hometown of Wichita Falls, Texas.

== Legacy and halls of fame ==
Ruby's racing career was honored with the Bruton Smith Legends Award at the Texas Motor Sports Hall of Fame in Fort Worth in 2005. He was inducted into the National Midget Auto Racing Hall of Fame in 2008. Ruby was also named co-recipient of the Louis Meyer Award along with Hélio Castroneves at the induction ceremony and special recognition dinner in Indianapolis. In 2015, he was inducted in the Motorsports Hall of Fame of America.

Indianapolis Motor Speedway historian Donald Davidson joined racing greats Johnny Rutherford, Parnelli Jones and Al and Bobby Unser in Wichita Falls when the Lloyd Ruby Overpass was named in honor of their racing friend.

== Complete USAC Championship Car results ==
Year	1	2	3	4	5	6	7	8	9	10	11	12	13	14	15	16	17	18	19	20	21	22	23	24	25	26	27	28	Pos	Points
1958	TRE	INDY	MIL	LAN	ATL	SPR	MIL	DUQ	SYR	ISF	TRE	SAC	PHX; 13																-	0
1959	DAY	TRE	INDY	MIL	LAN	SPR; DNQ	MIL; DNQ	DUQ; 13	SYR; 14	ISF; 13	TRE	SAC; 18	PHX; DNQ																-	0
1960	TRE	INDY; 7	MIL; 6	LAN; 11	SPR; 4	MIL; 17	DUQ; 6	SYR; 7	ISF; DNQ	TRE; 8	SAC; DNQ	PHX; 13																	9th	710
1961	TRE	INDY; 8	MIL; 21	LAN	MIL; 1	SPR; 16	DUQ; 16	SYR; 11	ISF; DNQ	TRE; 18	SAC; DNQ	PHX																	11th	670
1962	TRE	INDY; 8	MIL; 19	LAN	TRE	SPR; 6	MIL; 22	LAN	SYR; 11	ISF; 13	TRE; 6	SAC; 8	PHX; 3																11th	700
1963	TRE; 19	INDY; 19	MIL; 12	LAN	TRE; 24	SPR; 9	MIL; 26	DUQ; 17	ISF; 8	TRE; 8	SAC; 4	PHX; 16																	16th	320
1964	PHX; 9	TRE; 5	INDY; 3	MIL; 18	LAN; 8	TRE; 2	SPR; 12	MIL; 10	DUQ; 17	ISF; 9	TRE; 26	SAC; 5	PHX; 1																3rd	1,752
1965	PHX; 5	TRE; DNQ	INDY; 11	MIL; 19	LAN; 3	PPR	TRE; 18	IRP; 7	ATL; 23	LAN	MIL; 9	ISF	MIL; 3	DSF	INF; 10	TRE; 26	SAC	PHX; DNQ											13th	850
1966	PHX; 12	TRE; 21	INDY; 11	MIL; DNP	LAN	ATL	PIP	IRP; 16	LAN; 24	SPR	MIL; 9	DUQ	ISF	TRE; 22	SAC	PHX; 6													20th	355
1967	PHX; 1	TRE; 21	INDY; 33	MIL; 2	LAN; 1	PIP	MOS; 4	MOS; 4	IRP; 16	LAN; DNQ	MTR; 4	MTR; 3	SPR	MIL; 13	DUQ	ISF; DNQ	TRE; 26	SAC	HAN; 3	PHX; 5	RIV; 4								6th	2.090
1968	HAN; 3	LVG; 4	PHX; 2	TRE; 12	INDY; 5	MIL; 1	MOS; 15	MOS; 12	LAN; 21	PIP	CDR; 2	NAZ; 17	IRP; 23	IRP; 15	LAN; 10	LAN; 6	MTR; 19	MTR; 14	SPR; DNQ	MIL; 1	DUQ; DNQ	ISF; DNQ	TRE; 16	SAC	MCH; 15	HAN; 18	PHX; 2	RIV; 3	4th	2,799
1969	PHX; 3	HAN; 2	INDY; 20	MIL; 13	LAN; 21	PIP	CDR	NAZ	TRE; 15	IRP; 7	IRP; 15	MIL; 3	SPR	DOV; DNQ	DUQ	ISF	BRN	BRN	TRE	SAC	KEN	KEN	PHX; 2	RIV; DNP					10th	1,190
1970	PHX; 3	SON	TRE; 1	INDY; 27	MIL; 4	LAN; DNP	CDR; 17	MCH	IRP	SPR	MIL; 20	ONT; 23	DUQ	ISF	SED	TRE; 22	SAC	PHX; 16											14th	790
1971	RAF; 2	RAF; 2	PHX; 5	TRE; 13	INDY; 11	MIL; 7	POC; 8	MCH; 21	MIL; 6	ONT; 4	TRE; 23	PHX; 24																	5th	1,830
1972	PHX; 21	TRE	INDY; 6	MIL; 22	MCH	POC; 26	MIL; DNQ	ONT; 17	TRE; 18	PHX; 7																			18th	490
1973	TWS; DNQ	TRE	TRE	INDY; 27	MIL; 21	POC; 3	MCH; 4	MIL; DNQ	ONT	ONT; 8	ONT; 28	MCH; 6	MCH; 4	TRE; 8	TWS; 4	PHX; 11													9th	1,610
1974	ONT; 3	ONT	ONT; 5	PHX; 9	TRE; 8	INDY; 9	MIL; 9	POC; 6	MCH; DNQ	MIL; 7	MCH; 21	TRE; DNQ	TRE	PHX															7th	1,580
1975	ONT	ONT	ONT	PHX	TRE	INDY; 32	MIL	POC	MCH	MIL	MCH	TRE	PHX; 10																33rd	45
1976	PHX	TRE	INDY; 11	MIL	POC	MCH	TWS	TRE	MIL	ONT	MCH	TWS; 13	PHX; 22																31st	100
1977	ONT; 17	PHX	TWS	TRE	INDY; 27	MIL	POC	MOS	MCH	TWS	MIL	ONT; DNP	MCH	PHX															-	0

== Indianapolis 500 results ==
Year	Car	Start	Qual	Rank	Finish	Laps	Led	Retired
1960	98	12	144.208	15	7	200	0	Running
1961	5	25	146.909	2	8	200	0	Running
1962	12	24	146.520	24	8	200	0	Running
1963	65	19	149.123	15	19	126	0	Crash T4
1964	18	7	153.932	8	3	200	0	Running
1965	7	9	157.246	9	11	184	0	Blown engine
1966	14	5	162.433	5	11	166	68	Cam stud
1967	25	7	165.229	8	33	3	0	Valves
1968	25	5	167.613	5	5	200	42	Running
1969	4	20	166.428	20	20	105	11	Fuel tank
1970	25	25	168.895	6	27	54	2	Drive gear
1971	12	7	173.821	7	11	174	3	Gears
1972	5	11	181.415	20	6	196	0	Flagged
1973	18	15	191.622	18	27	21	0	Piston
1974	9	18	181.699	20	9	187	0	Out of fuel
1975	7	6	186.984	7	32	7	0	Piston
1976	51	30	186.480	7	11	100	0	Flagged
1977	10	19	190.840	11	27	34	0	Crash T2
Totals						2357	126	

Starts	18
Poles	0
Front rows	0
Wins	0
Top-5s	2
Top-10s	7
Retired	10

- Ruby owns three of the top-ten 5-race finishing streaks in the 1960s

== World Championship career summary ==
The Indianapolis 500 was part of the FIA World Championship from 1950 through 1960. Drivers competing at Indy during those years were credited with World Championship points and participation. Ruby participated in two World Championship races: the 1960 Indianapolis 500 and the 1961 United States Grand Prix. He scored no championship points.

=== Complete Formula One World Championship results ===
(key)

Year	Entrant	Chassis	Engine	1	2	3	4	5	6	7	8	9	10	WDC	Points
1960	J C Agajanian	Watson	Offenhauser straight-4	ARG	MON	500; 7	NED	BEL	FRA	GBR	POR	ITA	USA	NC	0
1961	J Frank Harrison	Lotus 18	Climax straight-4	MON	NED	BEL	FRA	GBR	GER	ITA	USA; Ret			NC	0

== 24 Hours of Le Mans results ==
Year	Team	Co-drivers	Car	Class	Laps	Pos.	Class pos.
1967	(United States) Ford Motor Company (United States) Holman & Moody	(New Zealand) Denny Hulme	Ford GT40 Mk.IV	P +5.0	86	DNF	DNF
