= Gary Bettenhausen =

American racing driver (1941–2014)

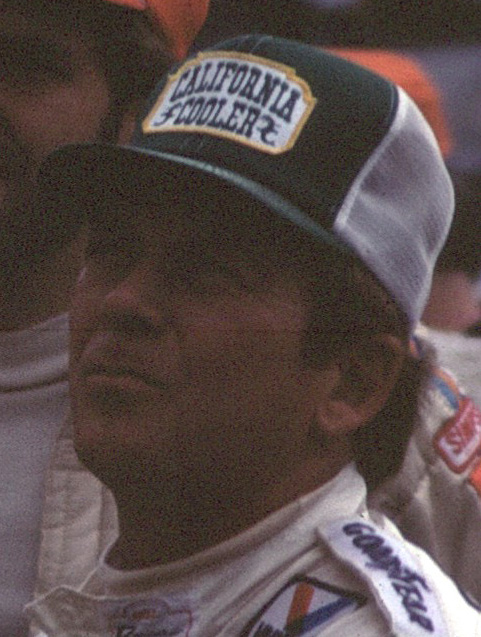
- Bettenhausen in 1984
- Nationality: American
- Born: Gary Clyde Bettenhausen; November 18, 1941 Blue Island, Illinois, U.S.
- Died: March 16, 2014 (aged 72) Monrovia, Indiana, U.S.

Champ Car career
- 188 races run over 30 years
- Years active: 1966–1994, 1996
- Best finish: 5th – 1979
- First race: 1966 Bobby Ball Memorial (Phoenix)
- Last race: 1996 U.S. 500 (Michigan)
- First win: 1968 Bobby Ball Memorial (Phoenix)
- Last win: 1983 Ted Horn Memorial (DuQuoin)
Wins	Podiums	Poles
6	24	4

NASCAR Cup Series career
- 8 races run over 2 years
- First race: 1967 Daytona 500 (Daytona)
- Last race: 1974 Motor State 360 (Michigan)
Wins	Top tens	Poles
0	4	0

Gary Clyde Bettenhausen (November 18, 1941 – March 16, 2014) was an American racing car driver. He was the winner the 1967 and 1970 Turkey Night Grand Prix, the 1972 Astro Grand Prix, and the 1976 Hut Hundred.

== Personal life ==
Bettenhausen was born in Blue Island, Illinois, raised in Tinley Park, Illinois, he graduated in 1962 from Bremen High School in Midlothian, Illinois.

Bettenhausen's father was Indianapolis 500 and sprint car legend Tony Bettenhausen. His brother was former CART driver and team owner Tony. Another brother, Merle, lost his arm in a fiery crash.

Bettenhausen married his wife Wavelyn on January 4, 1964, and the family had three children, Gary Jr., and twin sons Cary and Todd. They had two grandchildren.

Bettenhausen died on March 16, 2014, in Monrovia, Indiana.

== Racing career ==
=== Midgets ===
Bettenhausen began as a midget car driver. He finished third in the midget car national points in 1967. He won the first leg of the Astro Grand Prix in 1969, which was held in the Astrodome. He won the 1967 and 1970 Turkey Night Grand Prix, the 1972 Astro Grand Prix, and the 1976 Hut Hundred, on his way to a total of 27 career wins in USAC midget car competition.

=== Sprint cars ===
Bettenhausen won the 1969 and 1971 sprint car championships.

Bettenhausen won the 1980 and 1983 USAC Dirt Track championships in a Silver Crown car.

Bettenhausen suffered a crash at a Championship Dirt Car race (AKA Silver Crown Car) in Syracuse, New York on July 4, 1974, which crushed his left arm and left it paralyzed. He regained enough mobility to drive but never fully recovered from the injury.

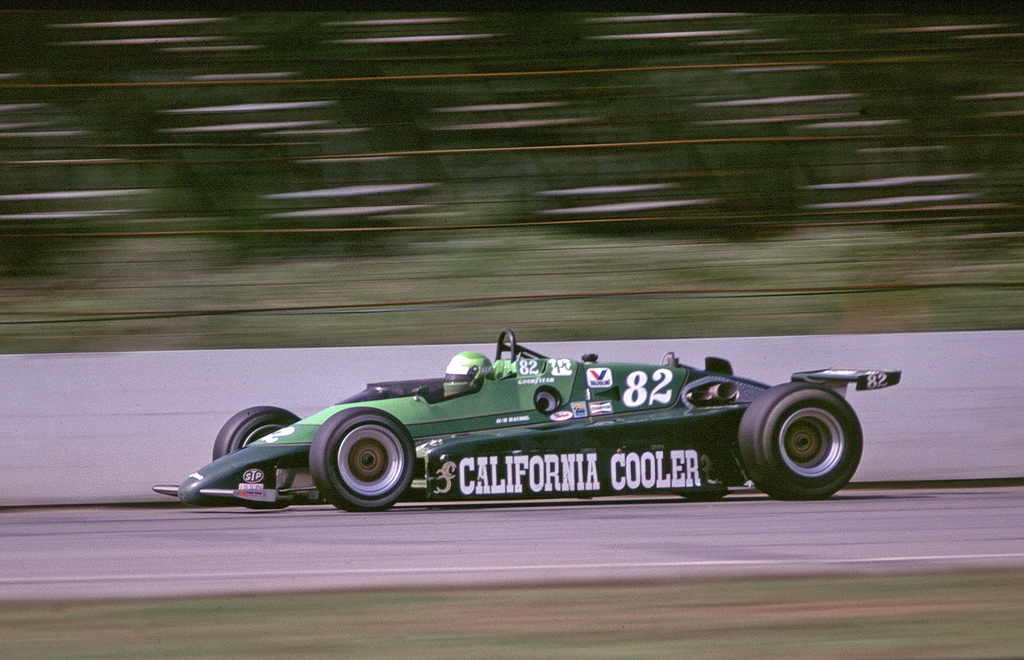
Bettenhausen racing in CART at Pocono Raceway in 1984

=== Indy/Championship Cars & Indianapolis 500 ===
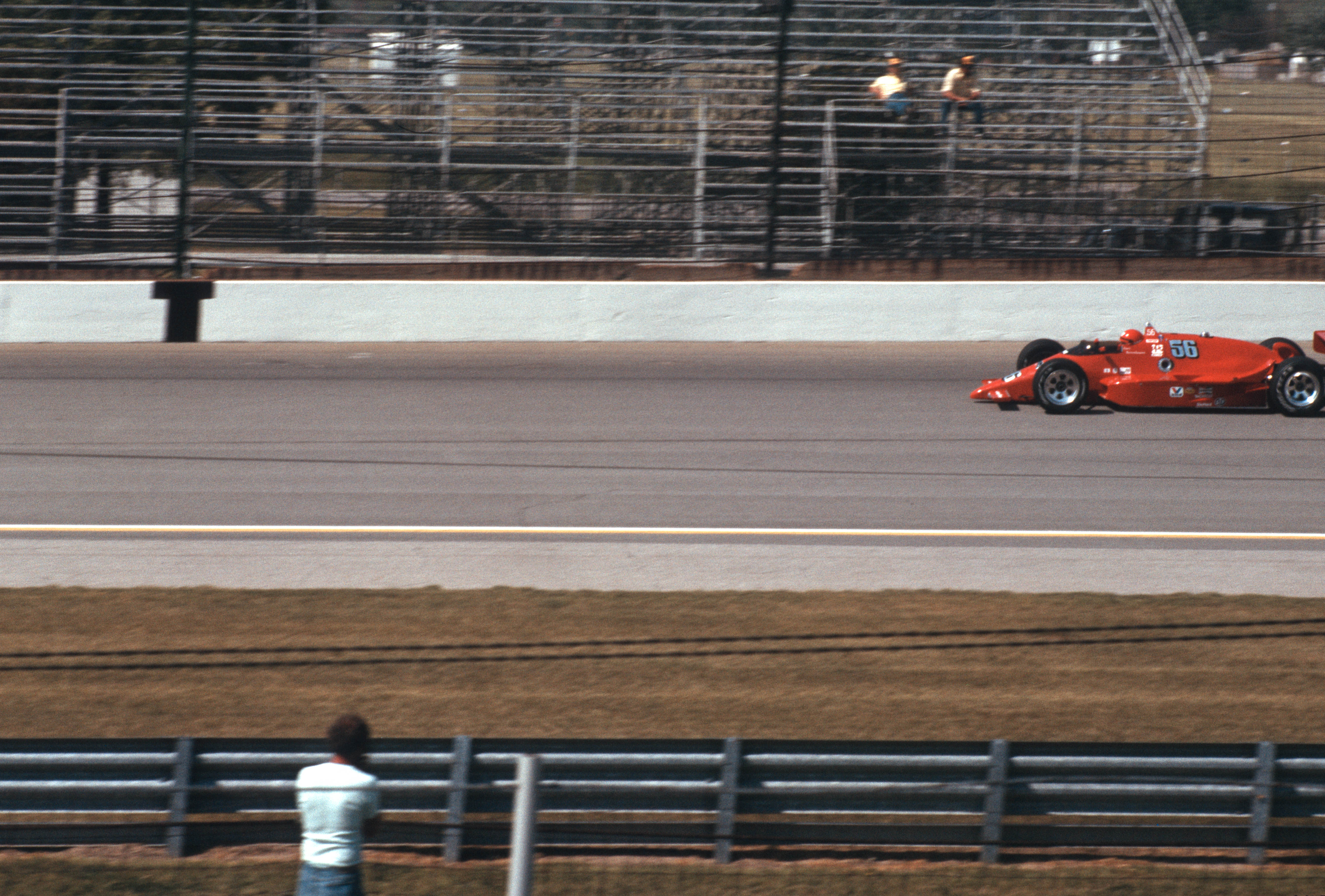
Bettenhausen qualifying for the 1987 Indianapolis 500

Bettenhausen competed in Champ/Indy style cars from the mid-1960s until 1996. During this time he won six USAC Indy Car races. He made 21 starts in the Indianapolis 500, contesting each event from 1968 until 1982 (with the exception of 1979 when he failed to qualify), and again from 1986 to 1993. His best finish came in 1980 when he finished third after starting 32nd in the 33-car field.

In the 1972 Indianapolis 500, Bettenhausen led 138 laps (of 200), and appeared on his way to victory. But he suffered a blown engine with only 24 laps remaining, and dropped out to finish fourteenth.

In the 1991 Indianapolis 500, Bettenhausen was the fastest qualifier at 224.468 mph. As his time was recorded on the second day of qualifying, Rick Mears, who had qualified slower (224.113 mph), started on the pole position.

=== NASCAR ===
Bettenhausen competed in eight career NASCAR Winston Cup events. He had four top-ten finishes. His highest career finish was a fourth-place finish at the 1974 Motor State 360 at the Michigan International Speedway. Twenty years after his last NASCAR race, he attempted to qualify for the inaugural Brickyard 400, but failed to make the field.

=== Awards ===
- Bettenhausen was inducted in the National Sprint Car Hall of Fame in 1993.
- Bettenhausen was a 1998 inductee in the National Midget Auto Racing Hall of Fame.

== Motorsports career results ==
=== American open-wheel racing ===
(key) (Races in bold indicate pole position)

==== USAC Championship Car ====
USAC Championship Car results
Year	Team	Chassis	Engine	1	2	3	4	5	6	7	8	9	10	11	12	13	14	15	16	17	18	19	20	21	22	23	24	25	26	27	28	Pos.	Pts
1966	American Eagle Racing	Meskowski 59 D	Offenhauser	PHX; DNQ	TRE; DNQ	INDY					IRP; DNQ	LAN; DNQ	ISF; DNQ		DSF; DNQ	INF	TRE; DNQ	SAC; DNQ														NC	0
1966	American Eagle Racing	Halibrand Shrike 65	Offenhauser				MIL; DNQ	LAN; DNQ	ATL; DNQ	PPR				MIL; DNQ																		NC	0
1966	Clyde Lynch	Halibrand Shrike 65	Offenhauser																PHX; 19													NC	0
1967	American Eagle Racing	Meskowski 59 D	Offenhauser	PHX	TRE	INDY	MIL	LAN	PPR	MOS	MOS	IRP	LAN	MTR	MTR	ISF	MIL	DSF	INF; DNQ	TRE												47th	60
1967	Joe Hunt	Lesovsky 58 D	Offenhauser																		SAC; 11	HAN; 11	PHX; 19	RSD; DNQ								47th	60
1968	Joe Hunt	Lesovsky 58 D	Offenhauser	HAN; 10	LVS; 10	PHX; 13	TRE																									8th	1595
1968	Don Gerhardt	Gerhardt	Offy 159 ci t					INDY; 24	MIL			LAN; 3	PPR					LAN; 13	LAN; 12				MIL; 5			TRE; 12		MCH; 21	HAN; 21	PHX; 1		8th	1595
1968	Don Gerhardt	Gerhardt	Ford 255 ci V8							MOS; 10	MOS; 13			CDR; 7		IRP; 21	IRP; 12			MTR; 13	MTR; 13										RSD; 19	8th	1595
1968	Don Gerhardt	Ward D	Offenhauser												NAZ; 4							ISF; 13		DSF; 4	INF; 4		SAC; 2					8th	1595
1969	Fred Gerhardt	Gerhardt 68	Offy 159 ci t	PHX; 20	HAN; 10			LAN; 6	PPR	CDR		TRE; 16																				14th	970
1969	Fred Gerhardt	Gerhardt 69	Offy 159 ci t			INDY; 26	MIL; 21						IRP; DNQ	IRP	MIL; 13		DOV; 5					TRE; 19				PHX; 20						14th	970
1969	Fred Gerhardt	Ward D	Offenhauser								NAZ; 2					ISF; 6		DSF; 10	INF; 2	BRN	BRN		SAC; 2	SIR	SIR							14th	970
1969	Fred Gerhardt	Gerhardt 69	Chevrolet 320 ci V8																								RSD; DNQ					14th	970
1970	Fred Gerhardt	Gerhardt 69	Offy 159 ci t	PHX; 17		TRE; 12																										17th	710
1970	Fred Gerhardt	Gerhardt 69	Chevrolet 320 ci V8		SON; 21																											17th	710
1970	Fred Gerhardt	Gerhardt 70	Offy 159 ci t				INDY; 26	MIL; 9	LAN; 5	CDR	**MCH**; 1	IRP; 22		MIL; 17	ONT; 19				TRE; DNQ		PHX; 19											17th	710
1970	Fred Gerhardt	Ward D	Ford										ISF; 20																			17th	710
1970	Fred Gerhardt	Ward D	Offenhauser													DSF; 9	INF; DNQ	SED; 16														17th	710
1970	Fred Gerhardt	Edmunds 68 D	Offy 159 ci t																	SAC; 9												17th	710
1971	Fred Gerhardt	Gerhardt 70	Offy 159 ci t	RAF; 11	RAF; 7	PHX; 20	TRE; 16	INDY; 10	MIL; 16	POC; 6	MCH; 22	MIL; 3	ONT; 3	TRE; 24	PHX; 5																	7th	1800
1972	Roger Penske Enterprises	McLaren M16A	Offy 159 ci t	PHX; 4	TRE; 1		MIL; 3																									12th	790
1972	Roger Penske Enterprises	McLaren M16B	Offy 159 ci t			INDY; 14		MCH; 24	POC; 19	MIL; DNS	ONT	TRE	PHX																			12th	790
1973	Penske Racing	McLaren M16B	Offy 159 ci t	TWS; 2	TRE; 6	TRE; 17																										8th	2093
1973	Penske Racing	McLaren M16C	Offy 159 ci t				INDY; 5	MIL; 3	POC; 27	MCH; 24	MIL; 20	ONT	ONT; 2	ONT; 19	MCH; 2	**MCH**; 8	TRE; 24	TWS; 1														8th	2093
1973	Penske Racing	Eagle 72	Offy 159 ci t																PHX; 6													8th	2093
1974	Penske Racing	McLaren M16C	Offy 159 ci t	ONT	ONT; 11	ONT; 20		TRE; DNS	INDY; 32	MIL; 2	POC; 31	MCH	MIL	MCH	TRE	TRE	PHX															22nd	260
1974	Penske Racing	Eagle 72	Offy 159 ci t				PHX; 14																									22nd	260
1975	Don Gerhardt	Eagle 72	Offy 159 ci t	ONT; 11	ONT	ONT; 14	PHX; 10	TRE	INDY; 15	MIL; 9	POC; 5	MCH	MIL	MCH	TRE	PHX; 6																14th	745
1976	Don Gerhardt	Eagle 72	Offy 159 ci t	PHX; DNS	TRE	INDY; 28	MIL; DNQ	POC; 33	MCH	TWS	TRE	MIL																				NC	0
1976	Joe Hunt	Eagle 73	Offy 159 ci t										ONT; 27	MCH	TWS	PHX																NC	0
1977	Joe Hunt	Eagle 73	Offy 159 ci t	ONT; 10	PHX; 11	TWS																										14th	850
1977	J. C. Agajanian	Dragon 76	Offy 159 ci t				TRE; 11	INDY; 16	MIL; 20	POC; 7	MOS; 2	MCH; 17	TWS		ONT; 17	MCH	PHX; 14															14th	850
1977	J. C. Agajanian	Kingfish 73	Offy 159 ci t											MIL; 8																		14th	850
1978	J. C. Agajanian	Dragon 76	Offy 159 ci t	PHX; 21	ONT; 12	TWS	TRE; 19	INDY; 16	MOS; 6	MIL; DNQ	POC; 29	MCH	ATL	TWS	MIL; 22	ONT	MCH	TRE; 9	SIL	BRH	PHX; 21											29th	294
1979	Armstrong Mould	Wildcat Mk 2	DGS 158 ci t	ONT; 18	TWS; 2				TWS; 5	MIL; 6																						5th	1008
1979	J. C. Agajanian	Kingfish 73	Chevrolet V8t			INDY; DNQ	MIL; 6	POC; 9																								5th	1008
1980	Armstrong Mould	Wildcat Mk 2	DGS 158 ci t	ONT	INDY; 3	MIL; 12	POC; 33	MOH; 20																								8th	726
1981-82	Lindsey Hopkins Racing	Lightning 80	Cosworth DFX V8t	INDY; 26					INDY; 12																							18th	366
1981-82	Vollstedt Enterprises	Vollstedt 73	Offy 159 ci t		POC; 27																											18th	366
1981-82						ISF; 20	DSF; 18	INF; 3																								18th	366
1982-83		King	Chevrolet	ISF	**DSF**; 1	NAZ; 24																										8th	406
1982-83	H & R Racing	Lightning 80	Chevrolet V6t				INDY; DNQ																									8th	406
1983-84				**DSF**; 1																												6th	400
1983-84	H & R Racing	March 84C	Cosworth DFX V8t		INDY; DNQ																											6th	400

==== PPG Indy Car World Series ====
PPG Indy Car World Series results
Year	Team	Chassis	Engine	1	2	3	4	5	6	7	8	9	10	11	12	13	14	15	16	17	Pos.	Pts	Ref
1979	J. C. Agajanian	Kingfish 73	Chevrolet V8t	PHX	ATL	ATL	INDY; DNQ	TRE	TRE	MCH	MCH	WGL	TRE	ONT	MCH	ATL	PHX				NA	-	
1980	Armstrong Mould	Wildcat Mk 2	DGS 158 ci t	ONT	INDY; 3	MIL; 12	POC; 33	MOH; 20	MCH; 9	WGL; 11	MIL; DNQ	ONT; 31	MCH; 19	MEX							9th	1057	
1980	Armstrong Mould	Orbitor 80C	Cosworth DFX V8t												PHX; 3						9th	1057	
1981	Rhoades Racing	Wildcat Mk 8	Cosworth DFX V8t	PHX	MIL	ATL	ATL	MCH; 6	RIV	MIL; 19	MCH	WGL	MEX	PHX							15th	42	
1982	Gohr Racing	Penske PC7	Chevrolet 355 ci V8	PHX	ATL	MIL	CLE	MCH; 6		POC; 8	RIV; DNQ	ROA; 20	MCH; 17								15th	48	
1982	Bettenhausen Racing	March 82C	Cosworth DFX V8t						MIL; 13					PHX; 9							15th	48	
1983	H & R Racing	Lightning 80	Chevrolet V6t	ATL	INDY; DNQ																34th	1	
1983	H & R Racing	Spirit 83	Chevrolet 355 ci V8			MIL; 22	CLE	MCH	ROA	POC; 27	RIV	MOH; DNS	MCH	CPL	LAG						34th	1	
1983	Bettenhausen Racing	March 82C	Cosworth DFX V8t													PHX; 12					34th	1	
1984	H & R Racing	March 84C	Cosworth DFX V8t	LBH	PHX	INDY; DNQ	MIL; 15	POR; 13	MEA		MCH; 23	ROA; DNQ	POC; 10	MOH	SAN						37th	1	
1984	Pabst Racing	March 83C	Cosworth DFX V8t							CLE; DNQ											37th	1	
1984	BC Pace Racing	March 83C	Cosworth DFX V8t													MCH; DNQ	PHX; DNQ	LAG	CPL		37th	1	
1985	Leader Card Racers	March 85C	Cosworth DFX V8t	LBH	INDY	MIL	POR	MEA	CLE	MCH	ROA	POC	MOH	SAN; 22	MCH; DNS	LAG	PHX; 16	MIA			NC	0	
1986	Leader Card Racers	March 85C	Cosworth DFX V8t	PHX; 21	LBH											MCH; 20	ROA	LAG			32nd	2	
1986	Leader Card Racers	March 86C	Cosworth DFX V8t			INDY; 11	MIL; 23	POR	MEA	CLE	TOR	MCH; 26	POC; 13	MOH	SAN; 21				PHX; 19	MIA	32nd	2	
1987	Gohr Racing	March 86C	Cosworth DFX V8t	LBH	PHX; 16	INDY; 5	MIL; 15	POR	MEA	CLE	TOR	MCH; 13	POC; 13	ROA	MOH	NAZ	LAG	MIA			24th	10	
1988	Scheid Tire Centers	March 87C	Cosworth DFX V8t	PHX	LBH	INDY; DNQ	MIL	POR	CLE	TOR	MEA	MCH	POC	MOH	ROA	NAZ	LAG	MIA			NA	-	
1989	Mann Motorsports	Lola T87/00	Buick 3300 V6t	PHX	LBH	INDY; 33	MIL	DET	POR	CLE	MEA	TOR	MCH	POC	MOH	ROA	NAZ	LAG			NC	0	
1990	Team Menard	Lola T89/00	Buick 3300 V6t	PHX	LBH	INDY; 31	MIL	DET	POR	CLE	MEA	TOR	MCH	DEN	VAN	MOH	ROA	NAZ	LAG		NC	0	
1991	Team Menard	Lola T91/00	Buick 3300 V6t	SRF	LBH	PHX	INDY; 22	MIL	DET	POR	CLE	MEA	TOR	MCH	DEN	VAN	MOH	ROA	NAZ	LAG	29th	1	
1992	Team Menard	Lola T92/00	Buick 3300 V6t	SRF	PHX	LBH	INDY; 17	DET	POR	MIL	NHA	TOR	MCH	CLE	ROA	VAN	MOH	NAZ	LAG		NC	0	
1993	Team Menard	Lola T93/00	Menard V6t	SRF	PHX	LBH	INDY; 17	MIL	DET	POR	CLE	TOR	MCH	NHA	ROA	VAN	MOH	NAZ	LAG		NC	0	
1994	Bettenhausen Motorsports	Penske PC-22	Ilmor 265C V8t	SRF	PHX	LBH	INDY; DNQ	MIL	DET	POR	CLE	TOR	MCH	MOH	NHA	VAN	ROA	NAZ	LAG		NA	-	
1996	Bettenhausen Motorsports	Penske PC-23	Mercedes-Benz IC108B V8t	MIA	RIO	SRF	LBH	NAZ	500; 21	MIL	DET	POR	CLE	TOR	MCH	MOH	ROA	VAN	LAG		NC	0	

===== Indianapolis 500 =====
Year	Chassis	Engine	Start	Finish	Team
1968	Gerhardt	Offenhauser	22	24	Don Gerhardt
1969	Gerhardt	Offenhauser	9	26	Fred Gerhardt
1970	Gerhardt	Offenhauser	20	26	Fred Gerhardt
1971	Gerhardt	Offenhauser	13	10	Fred Gerhardt
1972	McLaren	Offenhauser	4	14	Roger Penske Enterprises
1973	McLaren	Offenhauser	5	5	Penske Racing
1974	McLaren	Offenhauser	11	32	Penske Racing
1975	Eagle	Offenhauser	19	15	Don Gerhardt
1976	Eagle	Offenhauser	8	28	Don Gerhardt
1977	Dragon	Offenhauser	21	16	J. C. Agajanian
1978	Dragon	Offenhauser	31	16	J. C. Agajanian
1979	Wildcat	DGS	DNQ		J. C. Agajanian
1980	Wildcat	DGS	32	3	Armstrong Mould
1981	Lightning	Cosworth	11	26	Lindsey Hopkins Racing
1982	Lightning	Cosworth	30	12	Lindsey Hopkins Racing
1983	Lightning	Chevrolet	DNQ		H & R Racing
1984	March	Cosworth	DNQ		H & R Racing
1986	March	Cosworth	29	11	Leader Card Racers
1987	March	Cosworth	15	5	Gohr Racing
1988	March	Cosworth	DNQ		Scheid Tire Centers
1989	Lola	Buick	14	33	Mann Motorsports
1990	Lola	Buick	18	31	Team Menard
1991	Lola	Buick	13	22	Team Menard
1992	Lola	Buick	5	17	Team Menard
1993	Lola	Menard	18	17	Team Menard
1994	Penske	Ilmor	DNQ		Bettenhausen Motorsports

=== NASCAR ===
(key) (Bold – Pole position awarded by qualifying time. Italics – Pole position earned by points standings or practice time. * – Most laps led.)

==== Grand National Series ====
NASCAR Grand National Series results
Year	Team	No.	Make	1	2	3	4	5	6	7	8	9	10	11	12	13	14	15	16	17	18	19	20	21	22	23	24	25	26	27	28	29	30	31	32	33	34	35	36	37	38	39	40	41	42	43	44	45	46	47	48	49	NGNC	Pts	Ref
1967	Ranier Racing	68	Ford	AUG	RSD	DAY; 10	DAY	DAY; 31	AWS	BRI	GPS	BGS	ATL	CLB	HCY	NWS	MAR	SVH	RCH	DAR	BLV	LGY	CLT	ASH	MGR	SMR	BIR	CAR	GPS	MGY	DAY; 33	TRN	OXF	FDA	ISP	BRI	SMR	NSV	ATL	BGS	CLB	SVH	DAR	HCY	RCH	BLV	HBO	MAR	NWS	CLT	CAR	AWS	NA	0	

==== Winston Cup Series ====
NASCAR Winston Cup Series results
Year	Team	No.	Make	1	2	3	4	5	6	7	8	9	10	11	12	13	14	15	16	17	18	19	20	21	22	23	24	25	26	27	28	29	30	31	NWCC	Pts	Ref
1974	Penske Racing	16	AMC	RSD; 7	DAY; 12	RCH	CAR	BRI	ATL; 9	DAR	NWS	MAR	TAL; 37	NSV	DOV	CLT	RSD	MCH; 4	DAY	BRI	NSV	ATL	POC	TAL	MCH	DAR	RCH	DOV	NWS	MAR	CLT	CAR	ONT		43rd	49	
1994	Barkdoll Racing	60	Chevy	DAY	CAR	RCH	ATL	DAR	BRI	NWS	MAR	TAL	SON	CLT	DOV	POC	MCH	DAY	NHA	POC	TAL	IND; DNQ	GLN	MCH	BRI	DAR	RCH	DOV	MAR	NWS	CLT	CAR	PHO	ATL	NA	-	

===== Daytona 500 =====
Year	Team	Manufacturer	Start	Finish
1967	Ranier Racing	Ford	21	31
1974	Penske Racing	AMC	34	12
