= 1967 USAC Championship Car season =

Sports season

- USAC National Championship Trail

Season
- Races: 21
- Start date: April 9
- End date: November 26

Awards
- National champion: (United States) A. J. Foyt
- Indianapolis 500 winner: (United States) A. J. Foyt

The 1967 USAC Championship Car season consisted of 21 races, beginning in Avondale, Arizona, on April 9 and concluding in Riverside, California, on November 26. This season saw three new road courses added to the schedule in addition to the Hoosier Grand Prix at IRP: Mosport in Canada; Circuit Mont-Tremblant also in Canada; and the season finale at Riverside International Raceway in southern California in the United States. The USAC National Champion and Indianapolis 500 winner was A. J. Foyt.

== Schedule and results ==
Rnd	Date	Race name	Track	Location	Type	Pole position	Winning driver
1	April 9	(United States) Jimmy Bryan Memorial	Phoenix International Raceway	Avondale, Arizona	Paved	(United States) Lloyd Ruby	(United States) Lloyd Ruby
2	April 23	(United States) Trenton 150	Trenton International Speedway	Trenton, New Jersey	Paved	(United States) Mario Andretti	(United States) Mario Andretti
3	May 30; May 31	(United States) International 500 Mile Sweepstakes^{A}	Indianapolis Motor Speedway	Speedway, Indiana	Paved	(United States) Mario Andretti	(United States) A. J. Foyt
4	June 4	(United States) Rex Mays Classic	Milwaukee Mile	West Allis, Wisconsin	Paved	(United States) Gordon Johncock	(United States) Gordon Johncock
5	June 18	(United States) Langhorne 150	Langhorne Speedway	Langhorne, Pennsylvania	Paved	(United States) Al Unser	(United States) Lloyd Ruby
6	June 25	(United States) Pikes Peak Auto Hill Climb	Pikes Peak Highway	Pikes Peak, Colorado	Hill	(United States) Bobby Unser^{B}	(United States) Wes Vandervoort
7	July 1	(Canada) Telegram Trophy 200^{C}	Mosport Park	Bowmanville, Ontario	Road	(United States) Bobby Unser	(United States) Bobby Unser
8	July 1	(Canada) Telegram Trophy 200^{C}	Mosport Park	Bowmanville, Ontario	Road	(United States) Bobby Unser	(United States) Bobby Unser
9	July 23	(United States) Indianapolis 150	Indianapolis Raceway Park	Clermont, Indiana	Road	(United States) Lloyd Ruby	(United States) Mario Andretti
10	July 30	(United States) Langhorne 150	Langhorne Speedway	Langhorne, Pennsylvania	Paved	(United States) Gordon Johncock	(United States) Mario Andretti
11	August 6	(Canada) Labatt Indy^{D}	Circuit Mont-Tremblant	Saint-Jovite, Quebec	Road	(United States) Bobby Unser	(United States) Mario Andretti
12	August 6	(Canada) Labatt Indy^{D}	Circuit Mont-Tremblant	Saint-Jovite, Quebec	Road	(United States) Mario Andretti	(United States) Mario Andretti
13	August 19	(United States) Tony Bettenhausen Memorial	Illinois State Fairgrounds	Springfield, Illinois	Dirt	(United States) Larry Dickson	(United States) A. J. Foyt
14	August 20	(United States) Tony Bettenhausen 200	Milwaukee Mile	West Allis, Wisconsin	Paved	(United States) Roger McCluskey	(United States) Mario Andretti
15	September 4	(United States) Ted Horn Memorial	DuQuoin State Fairgrounds	Du Quoin, Illinois	Dirt	(United States) Bobby Unser	(United States) A. J. Foyt
16	September 9	(United States) Hoosier Hundred	Indiana State Fairgrounds	Indianapolis, Indiana	Dirt	(United States) Bruce Walkup	(United States) Mario Andretti
17	September 24	(United States) Trenton 200	Trenton International Speedway	Trenton, New Jersey	Paved	(United States) Mario Andretti	(United States) A. J. Foyt
18	October 1	(United States) Golden State 100	California State Fairgrounds	Sacramento, California	Dirt	(United States) Bruce Walkup	(United States) A. J. Foyt
19	October 22	(United States) Hanford 200	Hanford Motor Speedway	Hanford, California	Paved	(United States) Art Pollard	(United States) Gordon Johncock
20	November 19	(United States) Bobby Ball 150	Phoenix International Raceway	Avondale, Arizona	Paved	(United States) Bobby Unser	(United States) Mario Andretti
21	November 26	(United States) Rex Mays 300	Riverside International Raceway	Riverside, California	Road	(United States) Dan Gurney	(United States) Dan Gurney

Paved/Dirt Oval
Road Course/Hill Climb

^A Race was red flagged on May 30th lap 19 due to rain. The race was run to completion the next day (May 31st).
^B No pole is awarded for the Pikes Peak Hill Climb, in this schedule on the pole is the driver who started first. No lap led was awarded for the Pikes Peak Hill Climb, however, a lap was awarded to the drivers that completed the climb.
^C Run in two heats of 98 miles (158 kilometers) each.
^D Run in two heats of 100 miles (161 kilometers) each.

== Final points standings ==
Note: Ronnie Bucknum, George Follmer, Dan Gurney, Jimmy Clark, Lothar Motschenbacher, Jochen Rindt, Denis Hulme, Jackie Stewart, Graham Hill, John Surtees, Cale Yarborough, LeeRoy Yarbrough, Peter Revson and Jerry Titus are not eligible for points.

Pos	Driver	PHX1 (United States)	TRE1 (United States)	INDY (United States)	MIL1 (United States)	LHS1 (United States)	PIK (United States)	MOS (Canada)		IRP (United States)	LHS2 (United States)	CMT (Canada)		SPR (United States)	MIL2 (United States)	DQSF (United States)	ISF (United States)	TRE2 (United States)	CSF (United States)	HAN (United States)	PHX2 (United States)	RIV (United States)	Pts
1	(United States) A. J. Foyt	5	15	1	21	5		7	7	7	17	2	2	1	8	1	2	1	1	4	17	17	3440
2	(United States) Mario Andretti	DNS	**1**	**30**	Wth	3	14	21	11	1	1	1	**1**	2	1	2	1	**25**	2	24	1	3	3360
3	(United States) Bobby Unser	19	3	9	6	6	**5**	**1**	**1**	3	3	**22**	13	8	26	**6**	18	3	18	2	**3**	2	3020
4	(United States) Gordon Johncock	3	20	12	**1**	4		3	3	6	**2**	7	4		4			2		1	4	26	2700
5	(United States) Al Unser	23	12	2	19	**2**	DNQ	6	5	2	22	5	5	11	2	9	3	11	14	25	2	12	2505
6	(United States) Lloyd Ruby	**1**	21	33	2	1		4	4	**16**	DNQ	4	3		13		DNQ	26		3	5	4	2090
7	(United States) Jim McElreath	15	4	5	4	11		Wth		4	5	12	16	12	6	15	5	4	DNS	12	20	DNS	1750
8	(United States) Roger McCluskey	2	2	19	3	17		2	2	19	21	24		13	**3**	3	8	14	DNQ	21	21	5	1620
9	(United States) Joe Leonard	4	14	3	8	7		10	8		DNQ	6	6		5			17		7	24	16	1575
10	(United States) Bud Tingelstad		18	14	17	8		13	13	10	9	21		3	9	7	DNQ	5	8	6	7	27	965
11	(United States) Art Pollard	7	8	8	20	14		9	21		DNQ									**5**	14	30	655
12	(United States) Arnie Knepper	8	7	22	DNQ	19		5	6	5	24	DNQ									8	DNQ	595
13	(United States) Carl Williams			10	DNQ	16		15	15	8	11	14	17	9	23	8	7	10	4	18	23		585
14	(United States) Mel Kenyon	10	5	16	10					DNQ					7			24		10	9	21	500
15	(United States) Bill Vukovich II										23	23	11	6	16	5	4	13	17	26	DNQ	7	470
16	(United States) Chuck Hulse			7													9		9	9	DNP	29	460
17	(United States) Larry Dickson	20	16	15	9	21		19	16	21	8	9	18	**10**	11	4	14	16	7				425
18	(United States) Ronnie Duman		19	23	11	18		Wth		DNQ	18			14	DNQ	10	11	9	13	8	6	13	420
19	(United States) Wally Dallenbach Sr.	18	DNQ	29	5	12		12	12	15	4	8	15	17	21	DNQ	DNQ	19	DNQ	17	15	25	410
20	(United States) Parnelli Jones			6																			400
21	(United States) Johnny Rutherford			25	12	10		14	14	13	20	15		16	25	11	16	Wth	5	23	22	8	315
22	(United States) Bob Hurt	24		DNQ	22	20		22		22	19	10	9		22			6		20	10	24	290
23	(United States) Jim Hurtubise			DNQ	16	15		8	9	11	13	17	7	5	19		DNQ					18	280
24	(United States) Bob Harkey		11	DNQ	7	22		18	17		7	DNQ		DNQ	12	DNQ	DNQ	DNQ	DNQ		DNQ		230
25	(United States) Norm Brown	16	DNQ	DNQ	15	9				24	DNQ			4	10	17	13		16				220
26	(United States) Wes Vandervoort						1																200
27	(United States) Jim Malloy RY			DNQ	DNQ					12	6	19			24			22		16	16	11	195
28	(United States) Bruce Walkup R													DNQ	DNQ	12	**6**		**6**	DNQ	13		170
29	(United States) Ted Foltz						2																160
30	(United States) George Snider	21		26	18	DNQ				DNQ				18	DNQ	16	17	DNQ	3	22			140
31	(United States) Dan Morgan						3																140
32	(United States) Orville Nance						4																120
33	(United States) Greg Weld	6	13	DNQ										DNQ									120
34	(United States) Gig Stephens		6	DNQ		DNQ					DNQ							23					120
35	(United States) Mike Mosley R	DNQ	DNQ	DNQ	DNQ										DNQ			7		13			120
36	(United States) Ralph Liguori	DNQ	9	DNQ		DNQ		16	19	DNQ	DNQ			DNQ	18	DNS	10		10				120
37	(United States) Rick Muther R							11	10	20	DNQ	11	10		DNQ						12	23	120
38	(United States) Sam Sessions			DNQ							16							8					100
39	(United States) Bob Veith			11																			100
40	(United States) Paul Kleinschmidt						6																80
41	(United States) Jerry Grant	12		20	13	DNQ		17	20	18	12	18	8								18	14	80
42	(United States) Bob Wente			DNQ										7		DNQ	DNQ						60
43	(United States) Don Wilcox R						7			DNQ													60
44	(United States) Gary Bettenhausen																DNQ		11	11	19	DNQ	60
45	(United States) Ralph Bruning R						8																50
46	(United States) Gary Congdon	22		DNQ	DNQ	DNQ		20		14	10	16	19	DNQ	14	DNQ	DNQ						45
47	(United States) Bob Tattersall		10																				45
48	(United States) Grier Manning						9																40
49	(United States) Al Miller	17	DNQ	28		13				23	DNQ	13	14		17		DNQ	18		15	11	19	40
50	(United States) Bob Daly						10																30
51	(United States) George Benson R	11																			DNQ		30
52	(United States) Charles Louderman						11																20
53	(United States) Mickey Shaw			DNQ											DNQ	14		12					20
54	(United States) Rollie Beale R										DNQ			15		DNQ	12						10
55	(United States) Jerry Daniels			DNQ	DNQ											DNQ			12				10
56	(United States) Bob Herring R						12																10
-	(United States) Dan Gurney			21																		**1**	0
-	(United States) Ronnie Bucknum R			DNQ				DNS	18	9	DNQ	3	12									9	0
-	(New Zealand) Denny Hulme R			4																			0
-	(United States) George Follmer R									17	DNQ							21				6	0
-	(Germany) Lothar Motschenbacher R	9	DNQ	DNP																		28	0
-	(United States) Jerry Titus R																					10	0
-	(United States) Cale Yarborough						12																0
-	(United States) Bobby Grim			13	23					DNQ	DNQ				15			20		14			0
-	(United States) Bill Puterbaugh R													DNQ		13	15		15				0
-	(United States) Peter Revson	13	DNQ	DNP																			0
-	(United States) Larry Overholser R						13																0
-	(United States) Bruce Jacobi	14	DNQ	DNQ	14						14	20			20								0
-	(United States) Al Smith			DNQ	24	DNQ					15									19			0
-	(United States) Chuck Arnold			DNQ														15				DNS	0
-	(United States) Malcolm Brazier						15																0
-	(United States) Chuck Parsons R																					15	0
-	(United States) Don Anderson						16																0
-	(Belgium) Lucien Bianchi R	DNQ	17	DNQ																			0
-	(United States) Butch Hardman						17																0
-	(United Kingdom) Jackie Stewart			18																		DNS	0
-	(United States) Al Farmer						18																0
-	(United States) Rick Vermillion						19																0
-	(United States) Gene Pacheco R						20																0
-	(United Kingdom) John Surtees R																					20	0
-	(United Kingdom) Jim Clark			31																		22	0
-	(Austria) Jochen Rindt R			24																			0
-	(United States) LeeRoy Yarbrough R			27																			0
-	(United Kingdom) Graham Hill			32																			0
-	(United States) Jigger Sirois				DNQ									DNQ		DNQ	DNQ	DNS					0
-	(United States) Al Loquasto		DNS			DNQ				DNQ	DNQ												0
-	(United States) Dempsey Wilson	DNQ		DNQ																DNQ		DNS	0
-	(United States) Bay Darnell																	DNS					0
-	(United States) Don Thomas			DNQ		DNQ										DNQ	DNQ						0
-	(United States) Don Meacham				DNQ	DNQ													DNQ		DNQ		0
-	(United States) Sonny Ates																	DNQ		DNQ	DNQ		0
-	(United States) Norm Hall	DNQ		DNQ																			0
-	(United States) Johnny Boyd			DNQ	DNQ																		0
-	(United States) Bill Cheesbourg			DNQ	DNQ																		0
-	(United States) Aldo Andretti				DNQ	DNQ																	0
-	(United States) Ray Duckworth													DNQ		DNQ							0
-	(United States) Dale Breedlove									DNQ							DNQ						0
-	(United States) Chuck Booth																DNQ	DNQ					0
-	(United States) Frank Secrist					DNQ													DNQ				0
-	(United States) John McIntyre																		DNQ	DNQ			0
-	(United States) Masten Gregory			DNQ																		DNP	0
-	(United States) Skip Hedrick	DNQ																					0
-	(New Zealand) Chris Amon			DNQ																			0
-	(United States) Bob Bondurant			DNQ																			0
-	(United States) Bob Christie			DNQ																			0
-	(United States) Richie Ginther			DNQ																			0
-	(United States) Bobby Johns			DNQ																			0
-	(Mexico) Pedro Rodríguez			DNQ																			0
-	(United States) Vern Root			DNQ																			0
-	(United States) Ebb Rose			DNQ																			0
-	(United States) Les Scott			DNQ																			0
-	(United States) Chuck Stevenson			DNQ																			0
-	(United States) Johnny Coy					DNQ																	0
-	(United States) Dave Paul					DNQ																	0
-	(United States) Jerry Colton						DNQ																0
-	(United States) Butch Earley						DNQ																0
-	(United States) Gilbert Ligon						DNQ																0
-	(United States) P. McCormick						DNQ																0
-	(United States) Walter Miller						DNQ																0
-	(United States) Ralph Murdock						DNQ																0
-	(United States) Wib Spalding																		DNQ				0
-	(United States) Tommy Copp																			DNQ			0
-	(United States) Bobby Hogle																				DNQ		0
-	(United States) Dusty Smith																				DNQ		0
-	(Italy) Lorenzo Bandini			DNP																			0
-	(United States) Sam McQuagg			DNP																			0
Pos	Driver	PHX1 (United States)	TRE1 (United States)	INDY (United States)	MIL1 (United States)	LHS1 (United States)	PIK (United States)	MOS1 (Canada)	MOS2 (Canada)	IRP (United States)	LHS2 (United States)	CMT1 (Canada)	CMT2 (Canada)	SPR (United States)	MIL2 (United States)	DQSF (United States)	ISF (United States)	TRE2 (United States)	CSF (United States)	HAN (United States)	PHX2 (United States)	RIV (United States)	Pts

Color	Result
Gold	Winner
Silver	2nd place
Bronze	3rd place
Green	4th & 5th place
Light Blue	6th-10th place
Dark Blue	Finished (Outside Top 10)
Purple	Did not finish (Ret)
Red	Did not qualify (DNQ)
Brown	Withdrawn (Wth)
Black	Disqualified (DSQ)
White	Did not start (DNS)
Blank	Did not participate (DNP)
Blank	Not competing

**In-line notation**
**Bold**	Pole position
Italics	Ran fastest race lap
*	Led most race laps
RY Rookie of the Year
R Rookie

== See also ==
- 1967 Indianapolis 500
