= Wes Vandervoort =

American racing driver (1926–1993)

- Born: Wesley Charles Vandervoort; May 4, 1926 Colorado Springs, Colorado, U.S.
- Died: September 7, 1993 (aged 67) Colorado Springs, Colorado, U.S.

Championship titles
- Major victories Pikes Peak Hill Climb (1967)

Champ Car career
- 5 races run over 5 years
- Best finish: 30th (1967)
- First race: 1965 Pikes Peak Hill Climb (Pikes Peak)
- Last race: 1969 Pikes Peak Hill Climb (Pikes Peak)
- First win: 1967 Pikes Peak Hill Climb (Pikes Peak)
Wins	Podiums	Poles
1	4	0

Wesley Charles Vandervoort (May 4, 1926 – September 7, 1993) was an American racing driver. He is best known for competing annually in the Pikes Peak International Hill Climb, and for his victory at that event in 1967.

== Racing career ==
Vandervoort competed at Pikes Peak over a period of 12 years. He made a total of five Championship Car starts from 1965 to 1969, during which time Pikes Peak was part of the United States Auto Club (USAC) Championship Car season schedule.

Vandervoort finished on the podium nine times during his Pikes Peak career, and recorded only one finish outside of the top-ten. He won the event in 1967.

== Personal life ==
Vandervoort was born in Colorado Springs, Colorado, on May 4, 1926. He owned and operated a garage in Colorado Springs, and was known to make space and tools available to competitors in need. He died on September 7, 1993, in Colorado Springs.

== Awards and honors ==
- Pikes Peak Hill Climb Museum Hall of Fame (2022)

== Complete USAC Championship Car results ==
Year	1	2	3	4	5	6	7	8	9	10	11	12	13	14	15	16	17	18	19	20	21	22	23	24	25	26	27	28	Pos	Points
1965	PHX	TRE	INDY	MIL	LAN	PIP; 4	TRE	IRP	ATL	LAN	MIL	SPR	MIL	DUQ	ISF	TRE	SAC	PHX											41st	60
1966	PHX	TRE	INDY	MIL	LAN	ATL	PIP; 2	IRP	LAN	SPR	MIL	DUQ	ISF	TRE	SAC	PHX													35th	80
1967	PHX	TRE	INDY	MIL	LAN	PIP; 1	MOS	MOS	IRP	LAN	MTR	MTR	SPR	MIL	DUQ	ISF	TRE	SAC	HAN	PHX	RIV								26th	200
1968	HAN	LVG	PHX	TRE	INDY	MIL	MOS	MOS	LAN	PIP; 3	CDR	NAZ	IRP	IRP	LAN	LAN	MTR	MTR	SPR	MIL	DUQ	ISF	TRE	SAC	MCH	HAN	PHX	RIV	53rd	21
1969	PHX	HAN	INDY	MIL	LAN	PIP; 3	CDR	NAZ	TRE	IRP	IRP	MIL	SPR	DOV	DUQ	ISF	BRN	BRN	TRE	SAC	KEN	KEN	PHX	RIV					55th	21
