= Montreal Grand Prix (disambiguation) =

The Montreal Grand Prix, also known as the Molson Indy Montreal, was an annual auto race held from 1984 to 2006.

Montreal Grand Prix may also refer to:

Figure skating

- The competitions of the ISU Junior Grand Prix in Canada that were held in Montreal:
  - 1999 Junior Grand Prix in Canada
  - 2002 Junior Grand Prix in Canada
  - 2005 Junior Grand Prix in Canada

Racing

- Canadian Grand Prix, 1978-onwards Formula One race at Circuit Gilles Villeneuve
- Montreal ePrix, 2010s Formula E race on the streets of Downtown Montreal
- Grand Prix Cycliste de Montréal, 2010s UCI bicycle race on the streets of Montreal

== See also ==
- Mont-Tremblant Grand Prix (disambiguation)
