= 1968 USAC Championship Car season =

Sports season

- USAC National Championship Trail

Season
- Races: 28
- Start date: March 17
- End date: December 1

Awards
- National champion: (United States) Bobby Unser
- Indianapolis 500 winner: (United States) Bobby Unser

The 1968 USAC Championship Car season consisted of 28 races, beginning in Hanford, California on March 17 and concluding in Riverside, California on December 7. The USAC National Champion and Indianapolis 500 winner was Bobby Unser. Mike Spence died in an accident while practicing for the 1968 Indianapolis 500. Ronnie Duman died of burns suffered during the Rex Mays Classic.

== Schedule and results ==
Rnd	Date	Race name	Track	Location	Type	Pole position	Winning driver
1	March 17	(United States) California 200	Hanford Motor Speedway	Hanford, California	Paved	(United States) Bobby Unser	(United States) Gordon Johncock
2	March 31	(United States) Stardust 150	Stardust International Raceway	Las Vegas, Nevada	Road	(United States) Dan Gurney	(United States) Bobby Unser
3	April 7	(United States) Jimmy Bryan Memorial	Phoenix International Raceway	Avondale, Arizona	Paved	(United States) Bobby Unser	(United States) Bobby Unser
4	April 21	(United States) Trenton 150	Trenton International Speedway	Trenton, New Jersey	Paved	(United States) Mario Andretti	(United States) Bobby Unser
5	May 30	(United States) International 500 Mile Sweepstakes	Indianapolis Motor Speedway	Speedway, Indiana	Paved	(United States) Joe Leonard	(United States) Bobby Unser
6	June 8	(United States) Rex Mays Classic	Milwaukee Mile	West Allis, Wisconsin	Paved	(United States) Roger McCluskey	(United States) Lloyd Ruby
7	June 15	(Canada) Telegram Trophy 200^{A}	Mosport Park	Bowmanville, Ontario	Road	(United States) Dan Gurney	(United States) Dan Gurney
8	June 15	(Canada) Telegram Trophy 200^{A}	Mosport Park	Bowmanville, Ontario	Road	(United States) Dan Gurney	(United States) Dan Gurney
9	June 23	(United States) Langhorne 150	Langhorne Speedway	Langhorne, Pennsylvania	Paved	(United States) Gordon Johncock	(United States) Gordon Johncock
10	June 29	(United States) Pikes Peak Auto Hill Climb	Pikes Peak Highway	Pikes Peak, Colorado	Hill	(United States) Bobby Unser^{B}	(United States) Bobby Unser
11	July 7	(United States) Rocky Mountain 150	Continental Divide Raceways	Castle Rock, Colorado	Road	(United States) Ronnie Bucknum	(United States) A. J. Foyt
12	July 13	(United States) Nazareth 100	Nazareth Speedway	Nazareth, Pennsylvania	Dirt	(United States) Bill Vukovich II	(United States) Al Unser
13	July 21	(United States) Indy 200^{C}	Indianapolis Raceway Park	Clermont, Indiana	Road	(United States) Mario Andretti	(United States) Al Unser
14	July 21	(United States) Indy 200^{C}	Indianapolis Raceway Park	Clermont, Indiana	Road	(United States) Al Unser	(United States) Al Unser
15	July 28	(United States) Langhorne Twin 100^{C}	Langhorne Speedway	Langhorne, Pennsylvania	Paved	(United States) Gordon Johncock	(United States) Al Unser
16	July 28	(United States) Langhorne Twin 100^{C}	Langhorne Speedway	Langhorne, Pennsylvania	Paved	(United States) Al Unser	(United States) Al Unser
17	August 4	(Canada) Saint-Jovite 200^{C}	Circuit Mont-Tremblant	Saint-Jovite, Quebec	Road	(United States) Mario Andretti	(United States) Mario Andretti
18	August 4	(Canada) Saint-Jovite 200^{C}	Circuit Mont-Tremblant	Saint-Jovite, Quebec	Road	(United States) Mario Andretti	(United States) Mario Andretti
19	August 17	(United States) Tony Bettenhausen 100	Illinois State Fairgrounds	Springfield, Illinois	Dirt	(United States) Al Unser	(United States) Roger McCluskey
20	August 18	(United States) Tony Bettenhausen 200	Milwaukee Mile	West Allis, Wisconsin	Paved	(United States) Art Pollard	(United States) Lloyd Ruby
21	September 2	(United States) Ted Horn Memorial	DuQuoin State Fairgrounds	Du Quoin, Illinois	Dirt	(United States) Al Unser	(United States) Mario Andretti
22	September 7	(United States) Hoosier Hundred	Indiana State Fairgrounds	Indianapolis, Indiana	Dirt	(United States) Mario Andretti	(United States) A. J. Foyt
23	September 22	(United States) Trenton 200	Trenton International Speedway	Trenton, New Jersey	Paved	(United States) Al Unser	(United States) Mario Andretti
24	September 29	(United States) Golden State 100	California State Fairgrounds	Sacramento, California	Dirt	(United States) Mario Andretti	(United States) A. J. Foyt
25	October 13	(United States) Michigan Inaugural 250	Michigan International Speedway	Brooklyn, Michigan	Paved	(United States) Mario Andretti	(United States) Ronnie Bucknum
26	November 3	(United States) Hanford 250	Hanford Motor Speedway	Hanford, California	Paved	(United States) Joe Leonard	(United States) A. J. Foyt
27	November 17	(United States) Bobby Ball 150	Phoenix International Raceway	Avondale, Arizona	Paved	(United States) Mario Andretti	(United States) Gary Bettenhausen
28	December 7	(United States) Rex Mays 300	Riverside International Raceway	Riverside, California	Road	(United States) Dan Gurney	(United States) Dan Gurney

Paved/Dirt Oval
Road Course/Hill Climb

^A Run in two heats of 98 miles (158 kilometers) each.
^B No pole is awarded for the Pikes Peak Hill Climb, in this schedule on the pole is the driver who started first. No lap led was awarded for the Pikes Peak Hill Climb, however, a lap was awarded to the drivers that completed the climb.
^C Run in two heats of 100 miles (161 kilometers) each.

== Final points standings ==
Pos	Driver	HAN1 (United States)	STR (United States)	PHX1 (United States)	TRE1 (United States)	INDY (United States)	MIL1 (United States)	MOS (Canada)		LHS1 (United States)	PIK (United States)	CDR (United States)	NAZ (United States)	IRP (United States)		LHS2 (United States)		CMT (Canada)		SPR (United States)	MIL2 (United States)	DQSF (United States)	ISF (United States)	TRE2 (United States)	CSF (United States)	MIS (United States)	HAN2 (United States)	PHX2 (United States)	RIV (United States)	Pts
1	(United States) Bobby Unser	**5**	1	**1**	1	1	21	17		2	**1**	11	7	3	21	2	16	2	11	DNQ	4	18	16	7	DNQ	17	2	19	2	4330
2	(United States) Mario Andretti	23	2	15	**2**	33	2	2	2	17	4	15	2	**2**	2	23		**1**	**1**	18	2	1	**2**	1	**4**	**2**	3	**24**	18	4319
3	(United States) Al Unser	2	14	16	17	26	3	4	5	12	22	4	1	1	1	1	**1**	9	15	**12**	3	**7**	15	**22**	3	18	15	15	26	2895
4	(United States) Lloyd Ruby	3	4	2	12	5	1	15	12	21		2	17	23	15	10	6	19	14	DNQ	1	DNQ	DNQ	16		15	18	2	3	2799
5	(United States) Bill Vukovich II	26	6	19	5	7	13	9	7	14		9	**3**	13	6	6	4			4	7	3	5	6	16	19	6	4	7	2410
6	(United States) A. J. Foyt	4	13	23	21	20	14					1		4	3			18		17	24	2	1	24	1	14	1	23	20	1860
7	(United States) Dan Gurney		**16**			2		**1**	**1**																				**1**	1800
8	(United States) Gary Bettenhausen	10	10	13		24	DNS	10	13	3		7	4	21	12	13	12	13	13	13	5	4	4	12	2	21	21	1	19	1595
9	(United States) Mel Kenyon	8		3	10	3	DNQ													DNQ	22	DNQ		DNQ		4	24	13	DNP	1355
10	(United States) Jim Malloy	DNQ		9	11	22	10	8	8	20		3		17	10	5	3	4	3	5	8	15	14	11	18	24	11	22	24	1265
11	(United States) Sam Sessions					9	11			16		12		22	19	4	11				6			4		7	8	5	25	1260
12	(United States) Gordon Johncock	1	7	18	4	27	12	13	DNS	**1**		25		5	16	**21**		15			15			19		DNQ	DNQ	7	11	1257
13	(United States) Roger McCluskey	6	12	14	16	29	**20**	3	14	9		17		19	7	22				1	23	5	12	2	12	25	10	11	12	1228
14	(United States) Bud Tingelstad	18		7	DNS	16	9	DNQ		19		13	13	16	5	15	2			8	18	DNQ	DNQ	3	8	9	7	10		1016
15	(United States) Wally Dallenbach Sr.	7		4	3	17	7			15		DNQ	11			3	5	20		7	20	DNQ	13	18	9	22	23	25	29	960
16	(United States) George Snider	9	5	6	6	31	8						8							3		10	3	DNQ	13			3	DNP	919
17	(United States) Larry Dickson			12		28	6		11	5		DNQ	6							2		DNQ	7	DNQ	7	8	26	8		890
18	(United States) Johnny Rutherford	20	11	17		18	4					20		24	20	25		5	5		11			5		16	25	17	6	890
19	(United States) Mike Mosley					8	19	16	9	4		14		9							17			DNS		3	13	9	14	860
20	(United States) Joe Leonard	22	3	22	8	**12**	18	7	6			8		14	DNS						16						**4**		17	850
21	(United States) Jim McElreath					14	DNQ					22		10	11	7	17	7	10		9			15		DNQ	5	6	28	771
22	(United States) Ronnie Bucknum					21		5	3			**19**		6	4			3	4							1	20	14	13	760
23	(United States) Art Pollard	16	8	5	13	13	16	14		18		5		7	9	26				DNQ	**14**	14	10	10	10	6	DNQ	20	16	696
24	(United States) Sonny Ates R	15		DNQ	22	DNQ				6						8	13							26		5	9	16		520
25	(United States) Rick Muther			DNQ	7	DNQ						6															DNQ	21	5	510
26	(United States) Ronnie Duman				DNP	6	22																							400
27	(United States) Bruce Walkup	13		20		DNQ	5			11			12	18	18	9	7			15	13	DNQ	DNQ		5					390
28	(United States) Max Dudley R	17		DNQ	9		15	DNQ		7		18				16	10	11	7		12			21		26	12			285
29	(United States) Bill Puterbaugh					DNQ	17			8			9			12	9			6		11								265
30	(United States) George Follmer	11	15	24	DNQ			11	10			DNS																	8	240
31	(United States) Arnie Knepper	24		DNQ	DNP	25	DNS					24	15	11	22	18				11	10	16	6	14		20		12	15	206
32	(United States) George Benson	25																				9	8		6		22			170
33	(United States) Carl Williams					15							5			17	8			DNS		13		13	15		19			150
34	(United States) Bobby Grim					10																DNQ								150
35	(United States) Jerry Daniels												10									8	9				DNQ			120
36	(United States) Wib Spalding R																							8						100
37	(United States) Bob Veith					11																								100
38	(United States) Chuck Booth				DNQ	DNQ				10			18			11	18			14		DNQ	11	DNQ						85
39	(United States) Tom Bigelow R																					6	DNQ		14					80
40	(United States) Keith Rachwitz	12	9	DNQ																							17	DNQ	DNQ	80
41	(United States) Rollie Beale				15	DNQ										19			DNQ		DNQ			9		DNQ		DNQ		80
42	(United States) Chuck Hulse	21	DNQ	8		DNQ																								75
43	(United States) Jigger Sirois R																			16	21	DNQ		25		10				75
44	(United States) Bob Harkey					DNQ		DNQ		13				20	17			12	8		DNQ			23		13				60
45	(United States) Denny Zimmerman R																							20		11		DNS		50
46	(United States) Bob Hurt	DNQ	DNQ	10		DNQ																								45
47	(United States) Ralph Liguori					DNQ							16			20				9		17	18							40
48	(United States) Roger West R																			10	19	DNQ	DNQ			DNQ			DNQ	30
49	(United States) Bruce Jacobi	19		21	19		DNQ			22		DNQ		15	13	DNQ	19					12	DNQ	DNQ	11		16	18		30
50	(United States) Dempsey Wilson	14	17	11		DNQ																						DNQ	DNQ	30
51	(United States) Al Smith																							DNQ		12				25
52	(United States) Ted Foltz										2																			24
53	(United States) Wes Vandervoort										3																			21
54	(United States) Paul Kleinschmidt										5																			15
55	(United States) Malcolm Brazier										6																			12
56	(United States) Bob Herring										7																			9
57	(United States) Grier Manning										8																			8
58	(United States) Ralph Bruning										9																			6
59	(United States) Charles Louderman										10																			5
-	(Canada) John Cannon R											10		8	8			6	2										9	0
-	(United States) Mark Donohue R							6	4																				21	0
-	(New Zealand) Denny Hulme					4																								0
-	(United States) Skip Scott R																												4	0
-	(Germany) Lothar Motschenbacher																	17	6											0
-	(United States) Bud Morley R											16						8											DNQ	0
-	(United States) Jack Eiteljorg R											23						10	9											0
-	(United States) Peter Revson																												10	0
-	(United States) Bob Daly										11																			0
-	(Canada) George Fejer R							12	15					DNS				14	12											0
-	(United States) Lou Sell R											21		12	14			16											30	0
-	(United States) Thurel Novotny										12																			0
-	(United States) Dick Heikes R										13																			0
-	(United States) Gene Willbanks R										14																			0
-	(United States) Greg Weld					DNQ							14			24				DNQ		DNQ	17				14	DNQ		0
-	(United States) Gig Stephens				DNQ					23						14	14							DNQ						0
-	(United States) Bay Darnell				14		23									DNQ										DNQ				0
-	(United States) Don Thomas R															DNQ	15													0
-	(United States) Butch Earley R										15																			0
-	(United States) Clark Yowell										16																			0
-	(United States) Henry Pens R					DNQ																		17						0
-	(United States) Jerry Colton R										17																			0
-	(United States) Don Meacham R																								17					0
-	(United States) Gene Bergin R			DNQ	18		DNQ			DNQ																				0
-	(United States) Tom Dillon R										18																			0
-	(United Kingdom) Graham Hill					19		DNQ																						0
-	(United States) LaVerne Ravenstein R										19																			0
-	(United States) Chuck Arnold				20																									0
-	(United States) Walter Miller										20																			0
-	(United States) Gene Pacheco										21																			0
-	(United States) Jerry Titus					DNQ																							22	0
-	(United States) Jerry Grant					23								DNS	23															0
-	(United States) Orville Nance										23																			0
-	(United States) Mickey Shaw																									23				0
-	(Australia) Jack Brabham																												23	0
-	(United States) Norm Brown						24																							0
-	(United States) Larry Overholser										24																			0
-	(United States) Bill Simpson R																												27	0
-	(United States) Jim Hurtubise					30																								0
-	(Austria) Jochen Rindt					32																								0
-	(United States) Dusty Smith																										DNQ		DNS	0
-	(United States) Billy Wilkerson																											DNS		0
-	(United States) Jim Reynard												DNQ							DNQ	DNQ	DNQ	DNQ	DNQ						0
-	(United States) Les Scott					DNQ	DNQ	DNQ																			DNP		DNQ	0
-	(United States) Karl Busson																					DNQ	DNQ			DNQ		DNQ		0
-	(United States) Danny Ongais	DNQ		DNQ		DNQ																								0
-	(United States) Dee Jones					DNQ	DNQ																							0
-	(United States) Ernie Koch																					DNQ	DNQ							0
-	(United States) Al Miller					DNQ																				DNQ				0
-	(Canada) Norm Ellefson																										DNQ	DNQ		0
-	(United States) Hamilton Vose							DNQ																					DNQ	0
-	(United States) Don Schisler																									DNQ			DNQ	0
-	(United States) Otto Becker											DNQ																	DNP	0
-	(United States) Bill Cheesbourg					DNQ																								0
-	(United States) Masten Gregory					DNQ																								0
-	(United States) Bobby Johns					DNQ																								0
-	(New Zealand) Bruce McLaren					DNQ																								0
-	(United Kingdom) Mike Spence					DNQ																								0
-	(United States) Chuck Stevenson					DNQ																								0
-	(United States) LeeRoy Yarbrough					DNQ																								0
-	(United States) Scott Brazier										DNQ																			0
-	(United States) Bob Tattersall												DNQ																	0
-	(United States) Earl Smith																											DNQ		0
-	(United States) Don Brown																												DNQ	0
-	(United States) Earl Dykes																												DNQ	0
-	(Canada) Ludwig Heimrath Jr.																												DNQ	0
-	(United Kingdom) Jackie Stewart					Wth																								0
-	(United Kingdom) Jim Clark					DNP																								0
-	(United States) Bob Herst					DNP																								0
-	(United States) Stew McMillan																												DNP	0
Pos	Driver	HAN1 (United States)	STR (United States)	PHX1 (United States)	TRE1 (United States)	INDY (United States)	MIL1 (United States)	MOS1 (Canada)	MOS2 (Canada)	LHS1 (United States)	PIK (United States)	CDR (United States)	NAZ (United States)	IRP1 (United States)	IRP2 (United States)	LHS2 (United States)	LHS3 (United States)	CMT1 (Canada)	CMT2 (Canada)	SPR (United States)	MIL2 (United States)	DQSF (United States)	ISF (United States)	TRE2 (United States)	CSF (United States)	MIS (United States)	HAN2 (United States)	PHX2 (United States)	RIV (United States)	Pts

Note 1: John Cannon, George Fejer, Lou Sell, Mark Donohue, Jack Eiteljorg, Bud Morley, Lothar Motschenbacher, Jochen Rindt, Graham Hill, Jack Brabham, Denis Hulme, Skip Scott and Peter Revson are not eligible for points.
Note 2: Ronnie Bucknum did not compete with a USAC license until after the events at Indianapolis Raceway Park.

Color	Gold	Silver	Bronze	Green	Light Blue	Dark Blue	Purple	Red	Brown	Black	White	Blank
Results	Winner	2nd place	3rd place	4th & 5th place	6th-10th place	Finished (Outside Top 10)	Did not finish (Ret)	Did not qualify (DNQ)	Withdrawn (Wth)	Disqualified (DSQ)	Did not start (DNS)	Did not participate (DNP); Not competing

**In-line notation**
**Bold**	Pole position
Italics	Ran fastest race lap
*	Led most race laps
RY Rookie of the Year
R Rookie

== See also ==
- 1968 Indianapolis 500
