= Molson Diamond Indy =

NTT IndyCar Series
- Location: Mosport Park; Bowmanville, Ontario, Canada; 44°03′00″N 78°40′40″W
- Corporate sponsor: Molson
- First race: 1967
- First USAC race: 1978
- Laps: 76
- Previous names: Telegram Trophy 200 (1967-1968); Molson Diamond Indy (1977–1978)
- Most wins (driver): Bobby Unser (2); Dan Gurney (2)
- Most wins (team): Eagle (2); Oscar Olson (2)
- Most wins (manufacturer): Chassis: Eagle (4) (13); Engine: Ford (2)

Circuit information
- Surface: Asphalt/Concrete
- Length: 3.957 km (2.459 mi)
- Turns: 10

The Molson Diamond Indy was an annual USAC Championship Car race. It was held in Bowmanville, Ontario, Canada. It was held from 1967 to 1968 and again from 1977 to 1978.

In 1967, the first ever Indy race held in Canada was the Telegram Trophy 200, held at Mosport Park in Bowmanville, Ontario as part of the USAC Championship Car season. The race was won by Bobby Unser for his first career Indy victory. Following Dan Gurney’s victory in 1968, a group led by John Bassett and Imperial Tobacco made the first proposal to run both the 1969 Telegram Trophy Indy race and the Formula One Canadian Grand Prix at a new street circuit along Lake Shore Boulevard and through Exhibition Place with the start/finish line and pits to be located inside Exhibition Stadium. Bassett dropped the idea just as the bill was going through third reading before Toronto city council.

After a nine-year absence, Indy cars returned to the Toronto area for the Molson Diamond Indy at Mosport Park won by A. J. Foyt in 1977 and Danny Ongais in 1978.

== Past winners ==
Season	Date	Driver	Team	Chassis	Engine	Race distance		Race time	Average speed (mph)	Report
Season	Date	Driver	Team	Chassis	Engine	Laps	Miles (km)	Race time	Average speed (mph)	Report
USAC National Championship Trail
1967	July 1	(United States) Bobby Unser	Leader Cards Racing	Eagle	Ford	40	98.36 (158.295)	0:59:14	102.770	Report
1967	July 1	(United States) Bobby Unser	Leader Cards Racing	Eagle	Ford	6	14.754 (23.744)			Report
1968	June 15	(United States) Dan Gurney	Oscar Olson	Eagle	Weslake-Ford	40	98.36 (158.295)	0:56:45	105.727	Report
1968	June 15	(United States) Dan Gurney	Oscar Olson	Eagle	Weslake-Ford	40	98.36 (158.295)	0:55:16	108.564	Report
1969 – 1976	Not held									
1977	July 3	(United States) A. J. Foyt	A. J. Foyt Enterprises	Coyote	Foyt	75	184.425 (296.803 km)	2:03:35	90.733	Report
1978	June 11	(United States) Danny Ongais	Interscope Racing	Parnelli	Cosworth	76	186.884 (300.761 km)	2:08:38	87.164	Report
1979	Not held									
1980	Sept 14	Race cancelled following unification of USAC and CART schedules.								

- 1967: Run in two heats of 98 miles (158 kilometers/40 laps) each. Second race stopped after 6 laps due to rain.
- 1968: Run in two heats of 98 miles (158 kilometers/40 laps) each.
