= Budweiser 500K =

- Venue: Riverside International Raceway
- First race: 1967
- Last race: 1983
- Distance: 313.500 mi (504.529 km)
- Laps: 95
- Previous names: Rex Mays 300 (1967–1969); Los Angeles Times 500 (1981); AirCal 500K (1982); Budweiser 500K (1983)
- Most wins (driver): Dan Gurney (2); Rick Mears (2)
- Most wins (team): All American Racers (2); Team Penske (2)
- Most wins (manufacturer): Chassis: Eagle (2); Penske (2); Engine: Cosworth (3)

The Budweiser 500K was an automobile race sanctioned by CART, it was held at Riverside International Raceway in Riverside, California. The event was held from 1967 to 1969 and again from 1981 to 1983.

== Racing History ==
=== 1967–1969 ===
From 1967 to 1969 Riverside served as the season-ending USAC championship race, the 1967 race was the last for Jim Clark in USAC before his death in April 1968. The race was replaced by the California 500 at Ontario Motor Speedway for 1970.

=== 1981–1983 ===
After Ontario Motor Speedway closed in 1980, Riverside returned in 1981 as a CART event. The series dropped Riverside in 1984. Riverside County would not host another major race for Indy cars until 2024, when The Thermal Club in Thermal, California, in Riverside County, California, was announced as the host of the INDYCAR Thermal $1,000,000 Challenge.

== Past winners ==
Season	Date	Driver	Team	Chassis	Engine	Race Distance		Race Time	Average Speed (mph)	Report	Ref
Season	Date	Driver	Team	Chassis	Engine	Laps	Miles (km)	Race Time	Average Speed (mph)	Report	Ref
USAC Championship Car history
Course: 2.600 miles (4.184 km)
1967	November 26	(United States) Dan Gurney	All American Racers	Eagle	Ford	116	301.600 (485.378)	2:48:51	107.170	Report	
1968	December 1	(United States) Dan Gurney	All American Racers	Eagle	Ford	116	301.600 (485.378)	2:42:01	111.689	Report	
1969	December 7	(United States) Mario Andretti	STP Corporation	Hawk	Ford	120	312.000 (502.115)	2:50:08	105.797	Report	
1970–1980	Not held										
CART Indy Car World Series history
Long Grand Prix Road Course: 3.300 miles (5.311 km)
1981	August 30	(United States) Rick Mears	Team Penske	Penske	Cosworth	95	313.500 (504.529)	2:43:40	108.300	Report	
1982	August 29	(United States) Rick Mears	Team Penske	Penske	Cosworth	95	313.500 (504.529)	2:42:14	115.944	Report	
1983	August 29	(United States) Bobby Rahal	Truesports	March	Cosworth	95	313.500 (504.529)	2:45:28	113.678	Report	

- 1983: Race postponed from Sunday to Monday due to rain.
