= Mont-Tremblant Grand Prix =

Mont-Tremblant Grand Prix may refer to:

- Canadian Grand Prix held at Circuit Mont-Tremblant during the 1968 and 1970 seasons
- Mont-Tremblant Champ Car Grand Prix held at Circuit Mont-Tremblant during 2007 and cancelled in 2008
- USAC Championship Car Mont-Tremblant Grand Prix held at Circuit Mont-Tremblant during 1967 and 1968 seasons
