= Bobby Unser =

American racing driver (1934–2021)

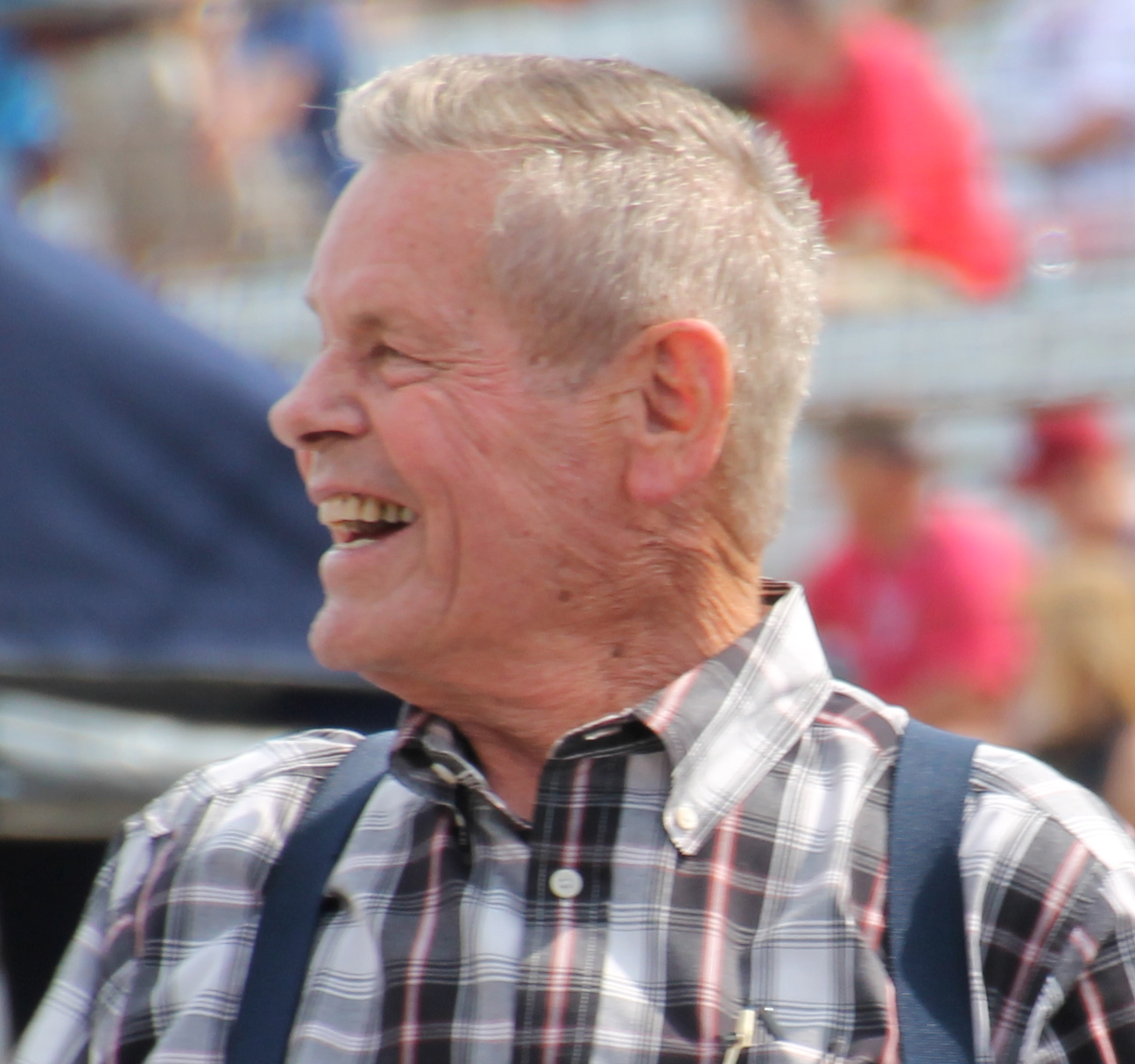
- Unser at the 2015 Indianapolis 500
- Born: Robert William Unser; February 20, 1934 Colorado Springs, Colorado, U.S.
- Died: May 2, 2021 (aged 87) Albuquerque, New Mexico, U.S.

Championship titles
- USAC Championship Car (1968, 1974); Major victories Pikes Peak Hill Climb (1956, 1958, 1959, 1960, 1961, 1962, 1963, 1966, 1968, 1986); Indianapolis 500 (1968, 1975, 1981); California 500 (1974, 1976, 1979, 1980); Pocono 500 (1980)

Champ Car career
- 258 races run over 21 years
- Best finish: 1st (1968, 1974)
- First race: 1955 Pikes Peak Hill Climb (Pikes Peak)
- Last race: 1981 Miller High Life 150 (Phoenix)
- First win: 1966 Pikes Peak Hill Climb (Pikes Peak)
- Last win: 1981 Indianapolis 500 (Indianapolis)
Wins	Podiums	Poles
35	83	52

NASCAR Cup Series career
- 4 races run over 3 years
- First race: 1969 Daytona Qualifier #2 (Daytona)
- Last race: 1973 Winston Western 500 (Riverside)
Wins	Top tens	Poles
0	2	0

Formula One World Championship career
- Nationality: (United States) American
- Active years: 1968
- Team: BRM
- Entries: 2 (1 start)
- Championships: 0
- Wins: 0
- Podiums: 0
- Career points: 0
- Pole positions: 0
- Fastest laps: 0
- First entry: 1968 Italian Grand Prix
- Last entry: 1968 United States Grand Prix

Robert William Unser (February 20, 1934 – May 2, 2021) was an American automobile racer. At his induction into the Motorsports Hall of Fame of America in 1994, he had the fourth most IndyCar wins at 35 (behind his brother Al, A. J. Foyt, and Mario Andretti). Unser won the 1968 and 1974 United States Automobile Club (USAC) national championships. He won the Pikes Peak International Hill Climb overall title 10 times (13 times when class wins are included).

Unser was the nephew of Louis Unser, brother of Al, Jerry Unser and Louie Unser, the father of Robby Unser and the uncle of Al Unser Jr. and Johnny Unser. The Unser family has won the Indianapolis 500 a record nine times, with Bobby and Al Unser Sr. being the only set of brothers to win in the race's history. Bobby Unser was one of ten drivers to have won the 500 three or more times and the first of two (followed by Rick Mears) to have won in three decades (1968, 1975, 1981).

== Early life ==
Unser was born in Colorado Springs, Colorado, the son of Mary Catherine (Craven) and Jerome Henry Unser, the third oldest of four brothers. When he turned one, his family moved to Albuquerque, New Mexico where his father started a garage on U.S. Route 66. From 1953 to 1955, he served in the United States Air Force and became a top competition sharpshooter in military matches.

== Racing career ==
=== Early career ===
Unser began racing in 1949 in a Modified at Roswell Speedway. In 1950, at the age of 15, he won his first championship in Southwest Modified Stock Cars. In 1955, Bobby and brothers Jerry and Al Unser decided to pursue racing careers in USAC. In 1959, his brother Jerry Unser died in a practice crash for the 1959 Indianapolis 500.

Unser was an early user of five-point harnesses, adopting them from aviation.

=== Pikes Peak International Hill Climb ===
Unser debuted in 1955 at Pike's Peak, dubbed "Unser's Peak" because of his family's history of success at the hill climb. He finished fifth that year, behind his two brothers. A year later, he won his first championship at Pikes Peak. He won six straight titles from 1958 to 1963. His streak ended in 1964 when his younger brother Al won the race.

Unser leads the all-time Pikes Peak International Hill Climb champion's list with ten overall wins, having set a new track record eight times. Unser's record time was broken by Michele Mouton, so Audi approached Unser asking if he would want to attempt to take the record back. In 1986, after a 12-year absence from the Pikes Peak race, he won the event for the tenth time driving an Audi Quattro. He eclipsed Mouton's time by 16 seconds. The win also broke the tie he had with his Uncle Louis Unser for nine overall victories each. The 1986 win brought Unser's total number of Pikes Peak victories to 13, including two stock car class victories (1969 and 1974) and a single sports car class win (1963).

=== IndyCar career ===
Unser came from a family of racecar drivers. He won numerous racing championships throughout his career, including three Indianapolis 500 titles. When asked in 2008 about his potential to move from midget and sprint cars, Unser said, "I never considered Indianapolis because I didn't think I was good enough. But Rufus (Parnelli Jones) told me I was going and he got me a ride and I always be indebted to him."

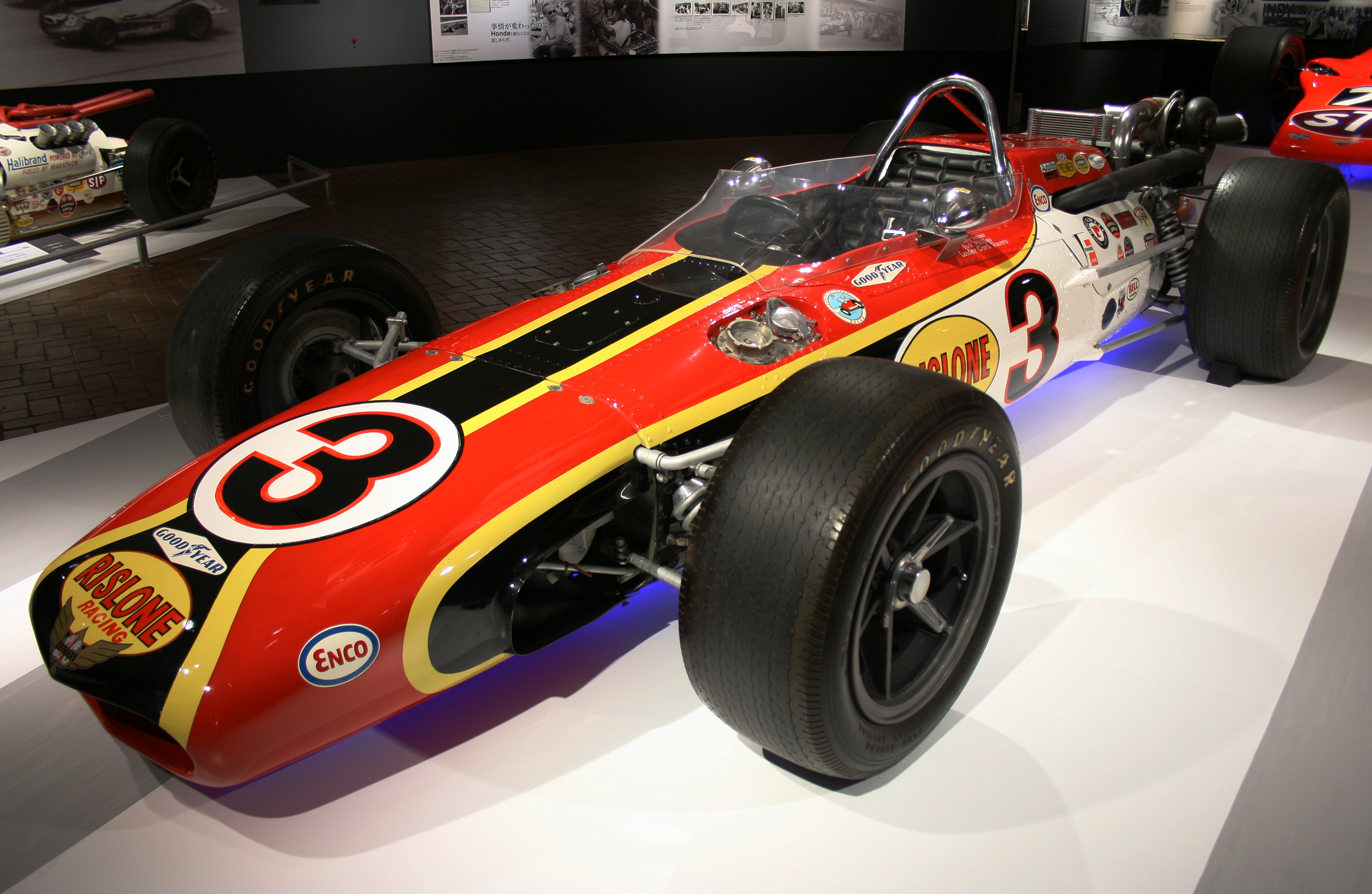
Unser's winning car from the 1968 Indianapolis 500

Unser made his IndyCar debut in 1962 (excluding the Pikes Peak races which were part of the IndyCar season in the 1950s). He raced for Andy Granatelli between 1963 and 1965 with a Novi engine. Unser raced in his first Indianapolis 500 in 1963. He crashed early and placed 33rd. Unser's second Indianapolis 500 in 1964 ended on the second lap in the crash that killed Eddie Sachs and Dave MacDonald. Unser moved to an IndyCar owned by Bob Willke from 1966 until 1970. His first IndyCar win came in 1967 at Mosport, in Ontario. A year later, Unser won his first Indianapolis 500, setting the record as the first driver to race over 170 miles per hour at Indianapolis. In 1968, Unser worked with crew chief Jud Phillips and won his first USAC National Driving Championship with wins at Stardust International Raceway, Phoenix Raceway, Trenton Speedway, Indy, and the Pikes Peak Hill Climb.

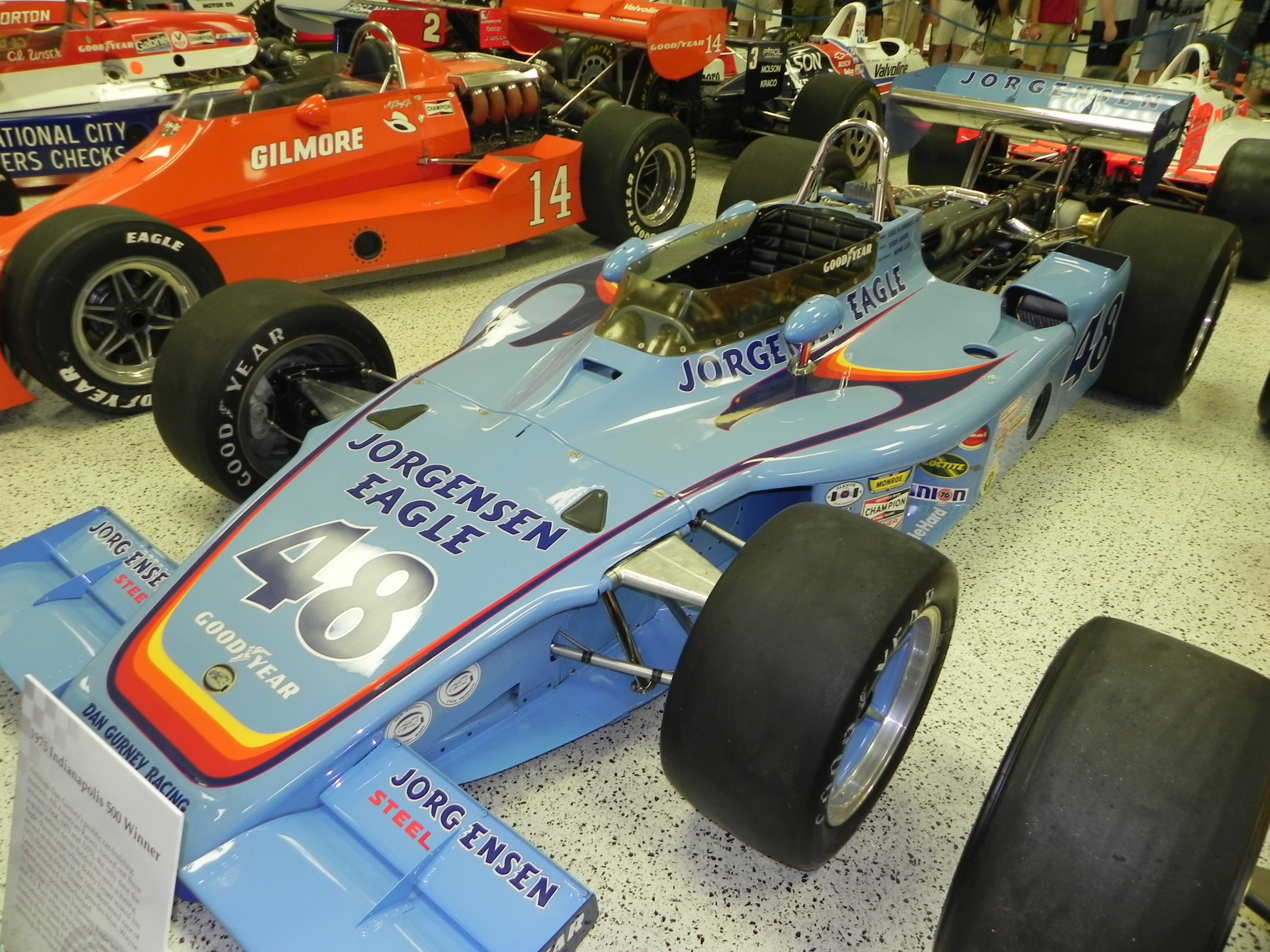
Unser's winning car from the 1975 Indianapolis 500

In 1972, Unser started working for Dan Gurney's All American Racers team and a John Miller Offenhauser engine. He set another Indianapolis 500 record for the fastest qualifying time at 195.940 miles per hour (315.335 km/h). Teams were allowed to bolt on a wing for the first time and speeds rose significantly (the previous record speed was 178.696 miles per hour (287.583 km/h)). Unser won nine pole positions (in ten races) and won four of the races. In 1974, he won his second USAC National Driving Championship. In 13 races, Unser won four times, took second four times, and finished in the top five twelve times. In the 1975 Indianapolis 500, he won his second 500 in a race that was rain-shortened on lap 174 because of torrential rains. Unser won twice in 1976 as part of the Fletcher Racing Team. He remained on Gurney's team until 1979.

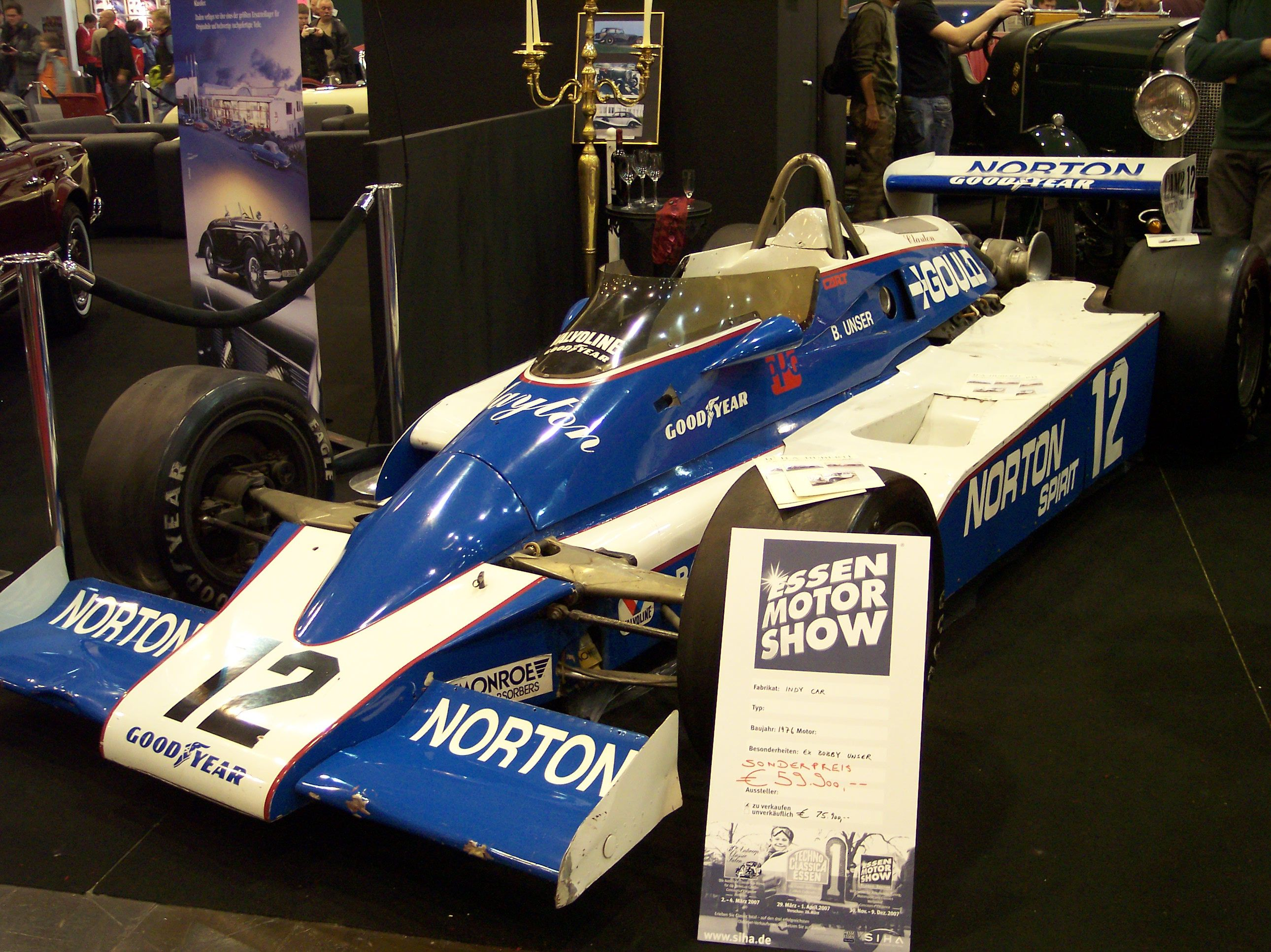
Unser's 1979 Penske Cosworth IndyCar

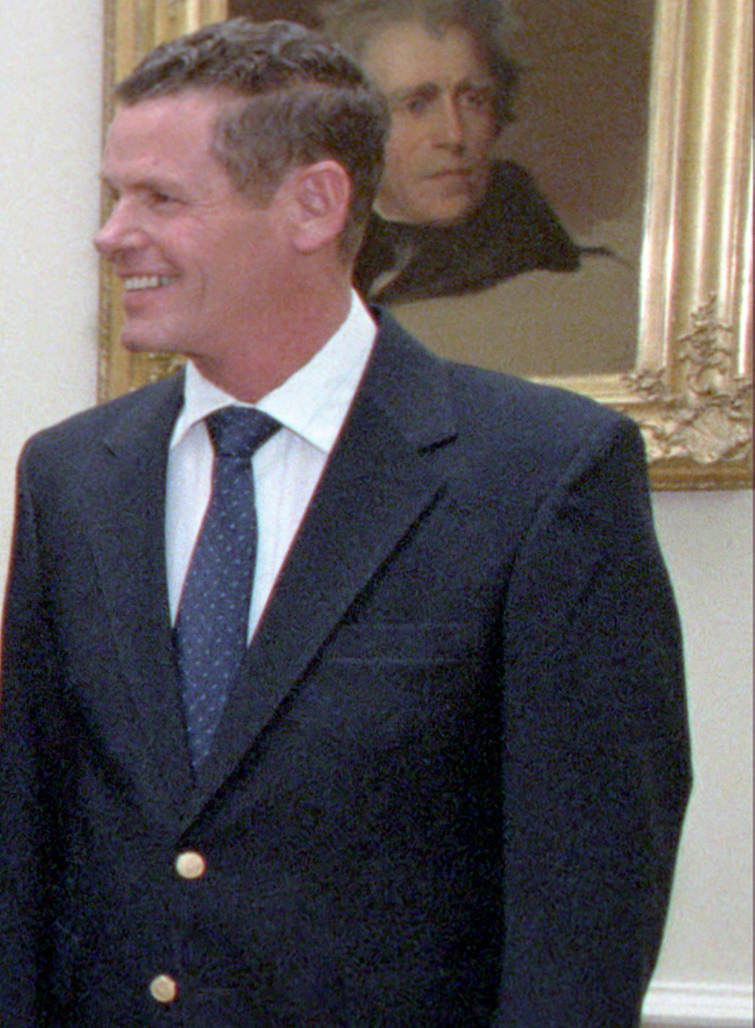
Unser in the White House in 1986

From 1979 to 1981, Unser raced in the CART series for Team Penske. Roger Penske wanted a proven winner to join his young driver Rick Mears. Unser won six times to Mears' three wins but Mears won the championship and Indianapolis 500. In 1980 he became the first driver to win the California 500 four times. Unser won four times in 1980 and finished second in the season championship to Johnny Rutherford. His career ended in 1981 following a controversial win at Indianapolis.

==== 1981 Indianapolis 500 controversy ====
Unser was the center of one of the most controversial finishes in Indy 500 history at the 1981 Indianapolis 500. Unser won the pole in the No. 3 Roger Penske-owned car and led the most laps (89 laps).

On lap 149, during a caution period, Unser and Mario Andretti made their pit stops and headed back to the race. Unser passed eight cars during the caution, while Andretti passed two cars. Unser won the race by 5.18 seconds, but was stripped of it the following morning in favor of second-place finisher Andretti. Andretti drove the only other car on the lead lap at the end. After a five-month lawsuit and protest by Penske, Unser was re-awarded the win in October 1981. For his infraction, Unser was instead fined $40,000 ($142,000 in today's money). Unser retired during off-season testing for Pat Patrick at Phoenix.

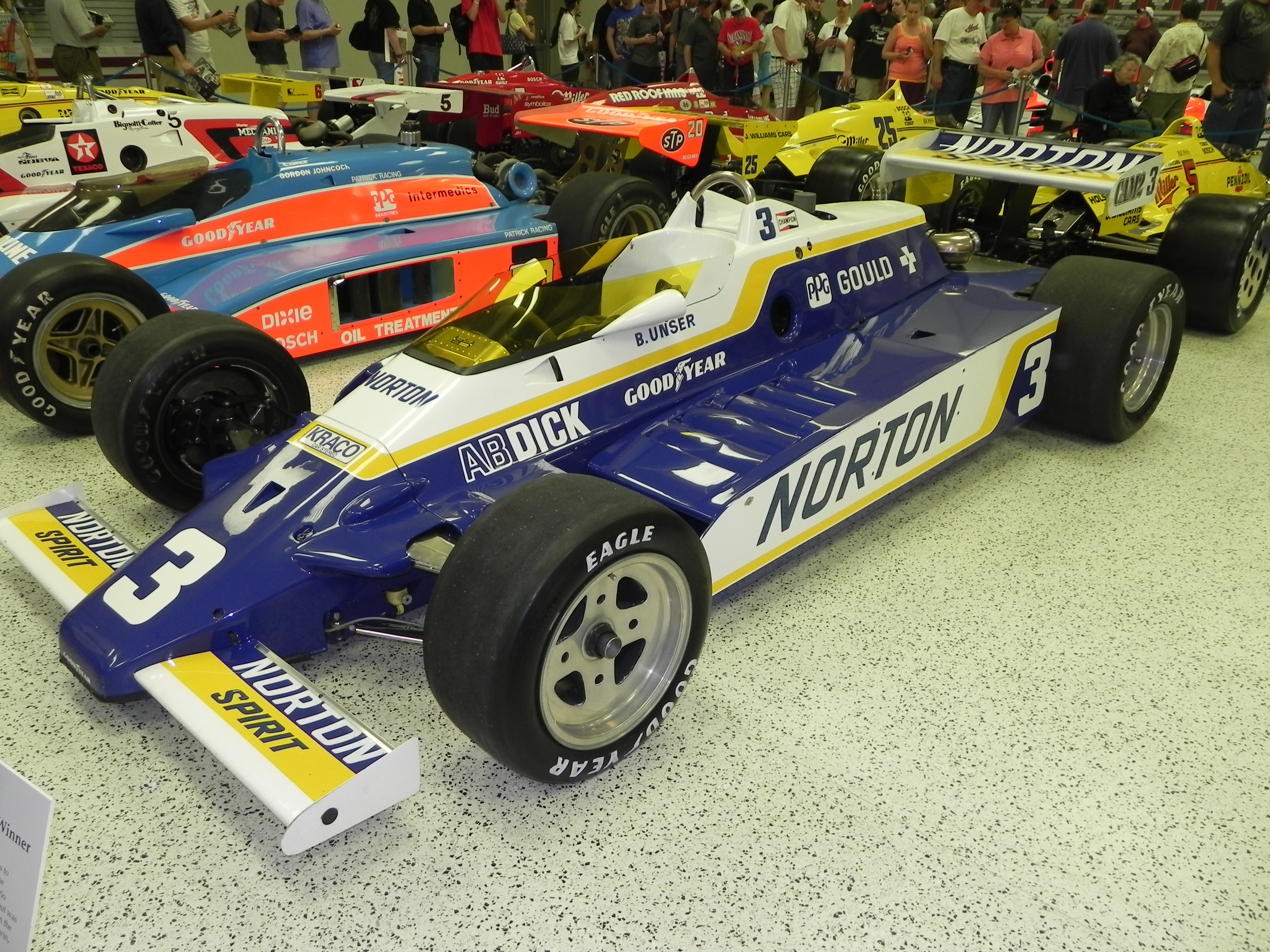
Unser's winning car from the 1981 Indianapolis 500

In his autobiography Winners Are Driven, Unser expressed his beliefs that the debacle was politically motivated and that USAC disqualified him (and benefited Andretti), hoping to start a falling-out between Pat Patrick, Andretti's car owner and owner of Patrick Racing, and Roger Penske (owner of Unser's car), in order to destroy CART. He claimed that Patrick's team did not protest the finish and that Patrick was on Unser's side in the controversy. For years, Unser and Andretti did not speak to each other willingly until early 2017 when Unser announced on his YouTube channel that Andretti reached out to wish him the best after Unser got extremely sick.

=== Other achievements ===
Unser was the 1975 International Race of Champions (IROC) champion and won the 1993 Fast Masters championship.

Unser challenged Dan Gurney to improve the performance of his 1971 USAC car, leading to the development of the Gurney flap. In 1993, Unser set a new Bonneville Salt Flats record at Bonneville Speedway of 223.709 in a D/Gas Modified Roadster that stood for 18 years.

In 2003, Unser published a book, Winners are Driven: A Champion's Guide to Success in Business and Life.

== Broadcaster ==
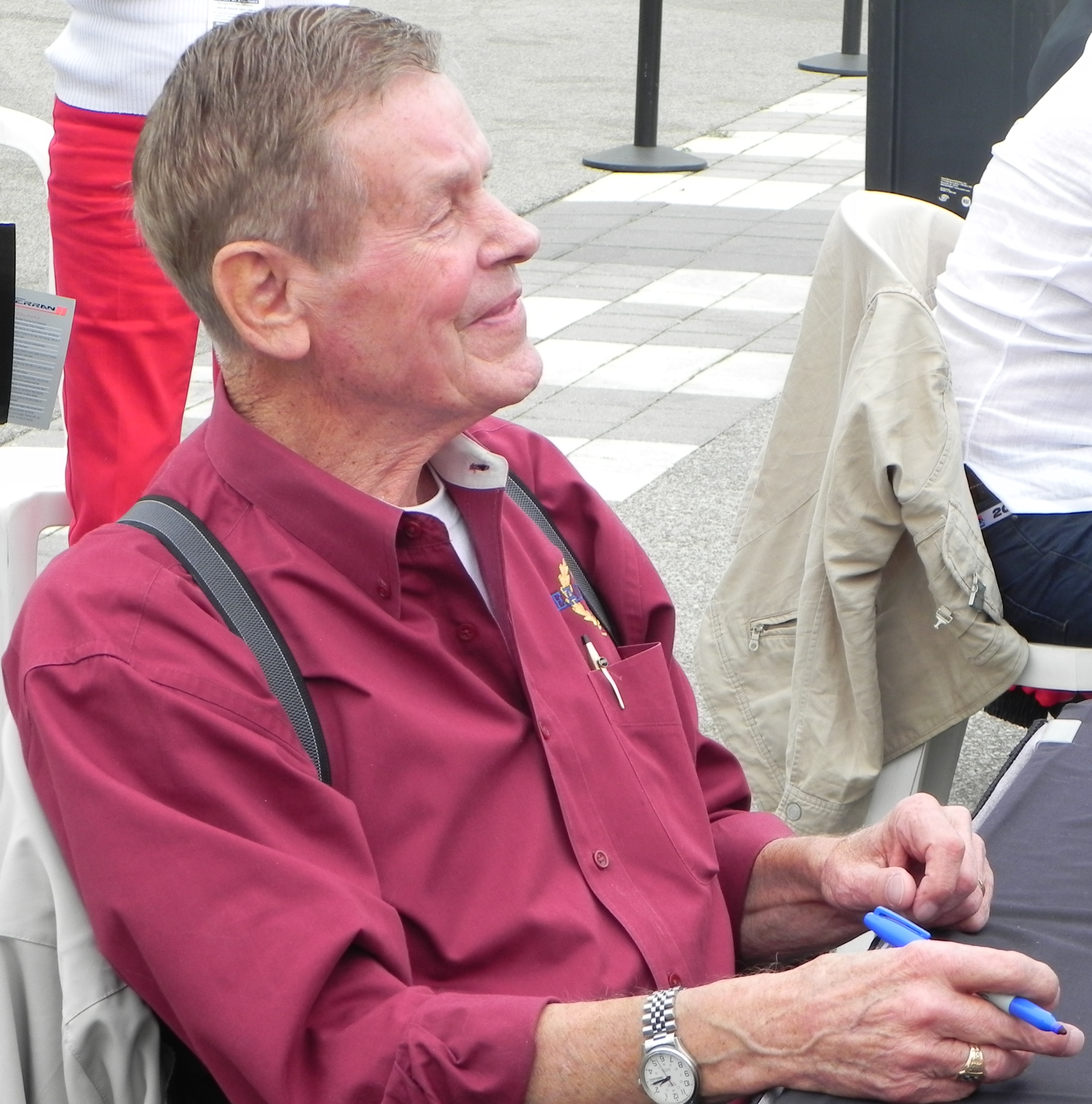
Unser in 2013

Unser was a television broadcaster for 20 years after his retirement from racing. He was a television commentator for IndyCar races after his retirement working for NBC, ABC, and ESPN. Unser also worked as the analyst for the IMS Radio Network in 1986. In 1989, the National Academy of Television Arts and Sciences awarded ABC's telecast of the Indianapolis 500 the Sports Emmy Award for "Outstanding Live Sports Special". Unser received announcer honors with Paul Page and Sam Posey.

Unser was announcing in the booth for his brother Al's record-tying fourth Indy 500 victory in 1987 and Al's 1985 CART championship. He also called his nephew Al Jr.'s first Indy 500 victory in the 1992 Indianapolis 500 and second in 1994.

Unser also broadcast several NASCAR events between 1986 and 1992 alongside Page and Benny Parsons. The most famous NASCAR race Unser broadcast was the 1989 The Winston in which Rusty Wallace won by wrecking Darrell Waltrip with 2 laps to go; Unser was the first broadcaster of the broadcasting team to spot the post-race fist-fight between Wallace and Waltrip's pit crews.

== Awards ==
- Unser was selected as one of Sports Illustrated's "Top Five Athletes" in the popular magazine's first twenty years, along with the Martini & Rossi and Olsonite "Driver of the Year" awards in 1974.
- Indianapolis Motor Speedway Hall of Fame (1990)
- International Motorsports Hall of Fame (1990)
- Motorsports Hall of Fame of America (1994)
- National Sprint Car Hall of Fame (1997)
- Pikes Peak Hill Climb Museum Hall of Fame (1997)
- Colorado Sports Hall of Fame (2011)
- International Snowmobile Hall of Fame (2018)
- He was presented with Indy 500 Front Row Award in 1999, for being a nine-time front row qualifier (1968, 1969, 1971, 1972, 1973, 1975, 1977, 1980, 1981).
- He was selected fourth in The Greatest 33 list of Indianapolis 500 drivers in 2011.

== Personal life ==
Unser was the father of two sons, Bobby Jr. and Robby, and two daughters, Cindy and Jeri. Unser coached Robby for the 1998 and 1999 Indianapolis 500.

On December 20, 1996 in Colorado, Unser and a friend became lost while snowmobiling near Unser's New Mexico ranch. They abandoned one stuck snowmobile before a storm blinded them both. When the second snowmobile stopped working, they spent two days and nights in subzero weather before finding a barn where they were found. Both men were suffering badly; his friend was suffering from hypothermia, and Unser had vomited blood during this time. Unser was later convicted of a Federal misdemeanor, "unlawful operation of a snowmobile within a National Forest Wilderness Area" (16 U.S.C. 551, 36 C.F.R. 261.16(a)), and was fined $75. Maximum penalties could have been up to six months in jail and up to $5,000.00 in fines. Unser appealed, claiming to have been lost before the accident, but the court ruled that maps were widely available and it was a public welfare offense, thus intent was not necessary. Unser appealed this decision all the way to the U.S. Supreme Court, but his writ of certiorari was denied.

== Death ==
Unser died on May 2, 2021, at the age of 87 at his home in Albuquerque, New Mexico from natural causes. Paul Page spoke at his funeral service; Mario Andretti and Roger Penske spoke via videotape. Pallbearers outside of the Unser family included Willy T. Ribbs, Johnny Rutherford, and Rick Galles. He was interred at Sunset Memorial Park.

== Racing record ==
=== American open-wheel racing results ===
(key) (Races in bold indicate pole position)

==== Complete USAC Championship Car results ====
Year	Team	Chassis	Engine	1	2	3	4	5	6	7	8	9	10	11	12	13	14	15	16	17	18	19	20	21	22	23	24	25	26	27	28	Pos	Points
1955				INDY	MIL	LAN	SPR	MIL	DUQ	PIK; 5	SYR	ISF	SAC	PHX																		32nd	100
1962				TRE	INDY	MIL	LAN	TRE	SPR	MIL	LAN	SYR	ISF	TRE	SAC; DNQ	PHX																-	0
1963				TRE	INDY; 33	MIL	LAN	TRE	SPR; 18	MIL	DUQ	ISF	TRE	SAC; 7	PHX; 9																	25th	100
1964				PHX; 17	TRE	INDY; 32	MIL; 12	LAN; 7	TRE; 18	SPR; 4	MIL; 20	DUQ; 4	ISF; 15	TRE; 6	SAC; 18	PHX; 22																14th	470
1965				PHX; 16	TRE; 10	INDY; 19	MIL; 17	LAN; 14	PIP; 2	TRE; 14	IRP; 2	ATL; 22	LAN; 5	MIL; 4	SPR; 10	MIL; 18	DUQ; 17	ISF; 4	TRE; 6	SAC; 4	PHX; 3											7th	1.402
1966				PHX; 19	TRE; 18	INDY; 8	MIL; 16	LAN; 14	ATL; 14	PIP; 1	IRP; 4	LAN; 19	SPR; 5	MIL; 8	DUQ; 3	ISF; 17	TRE; DNQ	SAC; 5	PHX; 4													6th	1.210
1967				PHX; 19	TRE; 3	INDY; 9	MIL; 9	LAN; 6	PIP; 5	MOS; 1	MOS; 1	IRP; 3	LAN; 3	MTR; 22	MTR; 13	SPR; 8	MIL; 26	DUQ; 6	ISF; 18	TRE; 3	SAC; 18	HAN; 2	PHX; 3	RIV; 2								3rd	3.020
1968	Leader Card Racing			HAN; 5	LVG; 1	PHX; 1	TRE; 1	INDY; 1	MIL; 21	MOS; 17	MOS	LAN; 2	PIP; 1	CDR; 11	NAZ; 7	IRP; 3	IRP; 21	LAN; 2	LAN; 16	MTR; 2	MTR; 11	SPR; DNQ	MIL; 4	DUQ; 18	ISF; 16	TRE; 7	SAC; DNQ	MCH; 17	HAN; 2	PHX; 19	RIV; 2	1st	4.330
1969				PHX; 8	HAN; 7	INDY; 3	MIL; 16	LAN; 1	PIP	CDR; 16	NAZ	TRE; 23	IRP; 24	IRP	MIL; 2	SPR; 10	DOV; 22	DUQ; 5	ISF; 3	BRN; 13	BRN; 11	TRE; 7	SAC; 3	KEN; 17	KEN; 5	PHX; 22	RIV; 4					3rd	2.585
1970				PHX; 2	SON; 18	TRE; 4	INDY; 11	MIL; 6	LAN; 1	CDR; 4	MCH; 2	IRP; 24	SPR; 9	MIL; 19	ONT; 22	DUQ; 2	ISF; DNQ	SED; DNQ	TRE; 2	SAC; 6	PHX; 17											2nd	2.260
1971				RAF; 27	RAF	PHX; 2	TRE; 4	INDY; 12	MIL; 14	POC; 9	MCH; 18	MIL; 1	ONT; 21	TRE; 1	PHX; 8																	6th	1.805
1972				PHX; 1	TRE; 17	INDY; 30	MIL; 1	MCH; 14	POC; 20	MIL; Wth	ONT; 24	TRE; 1	PHX; 1																			8th	1.500
1973				TWS; 20	TRE; 19	TRE; 15	INDY; 13	MIL; 1	POC; 10	MCH; 20	MIL; DNQ	ONT	ONT	ONT; 7	MCH; 10	MCH; 16	TRE; 2	TWS; 15	PHX; 18													12th	1.108
1974				ONT; 2	ONT	ONT; 1	PHX; 2	TRE; 1	INDY; 2	MIL; 21	POC; 5	MCH; 1	MIL; 4	MCH; 3	TRE; 2	TRE; 1	PHX; 2															1st	4.870
1975	All American Racers	Eagle 74	Offy 159 L4 t	ONT	**ONT**; 10	ONT; 2	PHX	TRE	INDY; 1	MIL; 2	POC; 22	MIS; 5	MIL																			3rd	2.489
1975	Jerry O'Connell Racing	Eagle 74	Offy Drake L4 t											MIS2; 3	TRE	PHX																3rd	2.489
1976	Fletcher Racing	Eagle 74	Offy Drake L4 t	PHX; 1	TRE; DNQ	INDY; 10	MIL; 3	POC; 32	MIS	TWS	TRE	MIL; 4	ONT; 1	MIS; 4	TWS; 17	**PHX**; 21																6th	2.080
1977	Fletcher Racing	Lightning Mk1	Offy Drake L4 t	ONT; 15			TRE; WD	INDY; 18	**MIL**; 16	POC; 19	MOS	MIS; 21	TWS; 15	MIL; 17	ONT; 30	MIS																35th	75
1977	Fletcher Racing	Eagle 74	Offy Drake L4 t		PHX; 17	TWS																										35th	75
1977	Fletcher Racing	Lightning Mk1	Cosworth DFX V8 t														**PHX**; 8															35th	75
1978	All American Racers	Lightning Mk1	Cosworth DFX V8 t	PHX; 18	ONT; 16	TWS; 13	TRE; 20																									12th	1.122
1978	All American Racers	Eagle 78	Cosworth DFX V8 t					INDY; 6	MOS; 19	MIL; 17	POC; 20	MIS; 5	ATL; 3	TWS; 8	MIL; 20	ONT; 13	MIS	TRE														12th	1.122
1978	All American Racers	Eagle 78 MkII	Cosworth DFX V8 t																SIL; 8	BRH; 13	PHX; 11											12th	1.122
1979				ONT	TWS	INDY; 5	MIL	POC	TWS	MIL																						-	0
1980				ONT; 23	INDY; 9	MIL; 1	POC; 1	MOH; 15																								3rd	1,334
1981-82				INDY; 1	POC	ILL	DUQ	ISF	INDY; DNQ																							-	0

==== CART ====
Year	Team	Chassis	Engine	1	2	3	4	5	6	7	8	9	10	11	12	13	14	Rank	Points
1979	Team Penske	Penske PC-7	Cosworth DFX V8 t	**PHX**; 5	ATL1; 7	ATL2; 4	INDY; 5	TRE1; 1	**TRE2**; 1	**MIS1**; 19	MIS2; 1	WGL; 1	**TRE3**; 2	ONT; 1	**MIS3**; 1	**ATL3**; 3	**PHX2**; 2	**2nd**	**3820**
1980	Team Penske	Penske PC-9	Cosworth DFX V8 t	ONT1; 23	INDY; 19	MIL1; 1	**POC**; 1	MOH; 15	**MIS1**; 2	WGL; 1	MIL2; 3	**ONT2**; 1	MIS2; 2	**MEX**; 2	PHX; DNS			**2nd**	**3714**
1981	Team Penske	Penske PC-9B	Cosworth DFX V8 t	**PHX1**; 2	MIL1; 21	ATL1; 13	ATL2; 6	MIS1; 16	RIV; 9	MIL2; 3	MIS2; 7	WGL; 17	**MEX**; 15	**PHX2**; 2				**7th**	**99**

==== Indianapolis 500 results ====
Year	Chassis	Engine	Start	Finish
1963	Kurtis 500K	Novi	16th	33rd
1964	Ferguson P104	Novi	22nd	32nd
1965	Ferguson P104	Novi	8th	19th
1966	Huffaker 66	Offy	28th	8th
1967	Eagle 67	Ford	8th	9th
1968	Eagle 68	Offy	3rd	**1st**
1969	Lola T152	Offy	3rd	3rd
1970	Eagle 67	Ford	7th	11th
1971	Eagle 71	Offy	3rd	12th
1972	Eagle 72	Offy	**1st**	30th
1973	Eagle 73	Offy	2nd	13th
1974	Eagle 74	Offy	7th	2nd
1975	Eagle 74	Offy	3rd	**1st**
1976	Eagle 74–76	Offy	12th	10th
1977	Lightning Mk1/77	Offy	2nd	18th
1978	Eagle 78	Ford Cosworth DFX	19th	6th
1979	Penske PC-7	Ford Cosworth DFX	4th	5th
1980	Penske PC-9	Ford Cosworth DFX	3rd	19th
1981	Penske PC-9B	Ford Cosworth DFX	**1st**	**1st**

==== Indy 500 qualifying results ====
Year	Att #	Date	Time	Qual Day	Car #	Laps	Qual Time	Qual Speed	Rank	Start	Comment
1967	4	05-13	4	1	6	4	—	164.752	9	8	
1968	6	05-18	6	1	3	4	—	169.507	3	3	
1969	12	05-24	12	2	1	4	3:32.1600	169.683	3	3	
1970	24	05-16	24	1	3	4	3:33.6400	168.508	8	7	
1971	17	05-15	17	1	2	4	3:24.7600	175.816	3	3	
1972	13	05-14	16:49	1	6	4	3:03.7300	195.940	1	1	
1973	19	05-12	13:28	1	8	0	—	—	—	—	
1973	29	05-12	17:20	1	8	4	3:01.6500	198.183	2	2	
1974	14	05-11	11:40	1	48	4	3:14.4100	185.176	8	7	
1975	16	05-10	13:14	1	48	4	3:08.4100	191.073	3	3	
1976	1	05-15	14:36	1	3	1	—	—	—	—	PULLED OFF
1976	34	05-16	13:15	2	3	4	3:11.9800	187.520	5	12	
1977	6	05-14	11:44	1	6	1	—	—	—	—	PULLED OFF
1977	32	05-14	16:48	1	6	4	3:02.0700	197.726	2	2	
1978	30	05-20	17:07	2	48	4	3:04.9400	194.658	10	20	
1979	17	05-13	14:08	1	12	4	3:09.5600	189.913	4	4	
1980	23	05-10	14:16	1	11	4	3:09.4800	189.994	3	3	
1981	19	05-16	11:36	1	3	4	2:59.5100	200.546	2	1	

=== Complete Formula One World Championship results ===
Unser participated in two Formula One World Championship Grands Prix.

(key)

Year	Entrant	Chassis	Engine	1	2	3	4	5	6	7	8	9	10	11	12	WDC	Points
1968	Owen Racing Organisation	BRM P126	BRM P101 3.0 V12	RSA	ESP	MON	BEL	NED	FRA	GBR	GER	ITA; DNS	CAN			NC	0
1968	Owen Racing Organisation	BRM P138	BRM P101 3.0 V12											USA; Ret	MEX	NC	0

=== NASCAR ===
(key) (Bold – Pole position awarded by qualifying time. Italics – Pole position earned by points standings or practice time. * – Most laps led.)

==== Grand National Series ====
NASCAR Grand National Series results
Year	Team	No.	Make	1	2	3	4	5	6	7	8	9	10	11	12	13	14	15	16	17	18	19	20	21	22	23	24	25	26	27	28	29	30	31	32	33	34	35	36	37	38	39	40	41	42	43	44	45	46	47	48	49	50	51	52	53	54	NGNC	Pts	Ref
1969	Smokey Yunick	13	Ford	MGR	MGY	RSD	DAY	DAY; 4	DAY; 42	CAR	AUG	BRI	ATL	CLB	HCY	GPS	RCH	NWS	MAR	AWS	DAR	BLV	LGY	CLT	MGR	SMR	MCH	KPT	GPS	NCF	DAY	DOV	TPN	TRN	BLV	BRI	NSV	SMR	ATL	MCH	SBO	BGS	AWS	DAR	HCY	RCH	TAL	CLB	MAR	NWS	CLT	SVH	AUG	CAR	JFC	MGR	TWS	NA	-	

==== Winston Cup Series ====
NASCAR Winston Cup Series results
Year	Team	No.	Make	1	2	3	4	5	6	7	8	9	10	11	12	13	14	15	16	17	18	19	20	21	22	23	24	25	26	27	28	29	30	31	NWCC	Pts	Ref
1972	Nichels	99	Chevy	RSD	DAY	RCH	ONT	CAR	ATL	BRI	DAR	NWS	MAR	TAL	CLT	DOV	MCH	RSD	TWS	DAY	BRI	TRN	ATL	TAL	MCH	NSV	DAR	RCH	DOV	MAR	NWS	CLT; 43	CAR	TWS	NA	-	
1973	Holman-Moody	41	Ford	RSD; 4	DAY	RCH	CAR	BRI	ATL	NWS	DAR	MAR	TAL	NSV	CLT	DOV	TWS	RSD	MCH	DAY	BRI	ATL	TAL	NSV	DAR	RCH	DOV	NWS	MAR	CLT	CAR				NA	-	

===== Daytona 500 =====
Year	Team	Manufacturer	Start	Finish
1969	Smokey Yunick	Ford	4	42

Preceded by Mark Donohue	IROC Champion; IROC II (1975)	Succeeded by A. J. Foyt
Preceded by A. J. Foyt	Indianapolis 500 Winner; 1968	Succeeded by Mario Andretti
Preceded by Johnny Rutherford	Indianapolis 500 Winner; 1975	Succeeded by Johnny Rutherford
Preceded by Johnny Rutherford	Indianapolis 500 Winner; 1981	Succeeded by Gordon Johncock
