= Penrose Heritage Museum =

American non-profit organization

Coordinates: 38°47′34″N 104°51′0″W

The Pikes Peak Hill Climb Museum (PPHCM) is an American non-profit 501(c)(3) organization and serves to promote and develop educational awareness of advancements in motorsports technology and automotive engineering while maintaining and preserving the history of the Pikes Peak International Hill Climb (PPIHC).

The PPHCM is located within the Penrose Heritage Museum.

== Pikes Peak Hall of Fame inductees ==
The PPHCM includes a Hall of Fame for competitors, officials, members, press, and volunteers. The first members of the hall of fame were inducted in 1997. The following list contains people inducted into the hall of fame.

Person	Inducted
J. C. Agajanian	2016
Sonny Anderson	2016
David Bachoroski	2022
Beck Bechtelheimer	2024
Bill Brokaw	2016
Annette "Peppy" Dallenbach	2022
Paul Dallenbach	2022
Wally Dallenbach Sr.	2022
Wally Dallenbach Jr.	2022
Wyatt Dallenbach	2022
Stanley DeGeer	2020
David Donner	2016
Robert Donner Sr.	2016
Robert Donner Jr.	2016
Robert Donner III	2016
Carlin Dunne	2020
Davey Durelle	2018
Ted Foltz	2024
Robert Gillis	2022
William J. Hybl	2020
Grier Manning	2022
Rod Millen	2016
Spencer Penrose	1997
Frank J. Peterson	2014
Judith K. Peterson	2014
Jim Reilly	1997
Al Rogers	1997
Nick Sanborn Jr.	2000
Randy Schranz	2018
Glen Shultz	2018
Nobuhiro Tajima	2016
Joyce Thompson Ford	2022
Gary Trachy	2022
Greg Trachy	2022
Charles L. Tutt IV	2016
William Thayer Tutt	1997
Al Unser	2020
Bobby Unser	1997
Louis Unser	1997
Clint Vahsholtz	2024
Leonard Vahsholtz	2018
Wes Vandervoort	2022
Ari Vatanen	2024
Art Walsh	2020
John Wells	2022
Jeff Zwart	2018
Michèle Mouton	2025
