= J. C. Agajanian =

American motorsports promoter

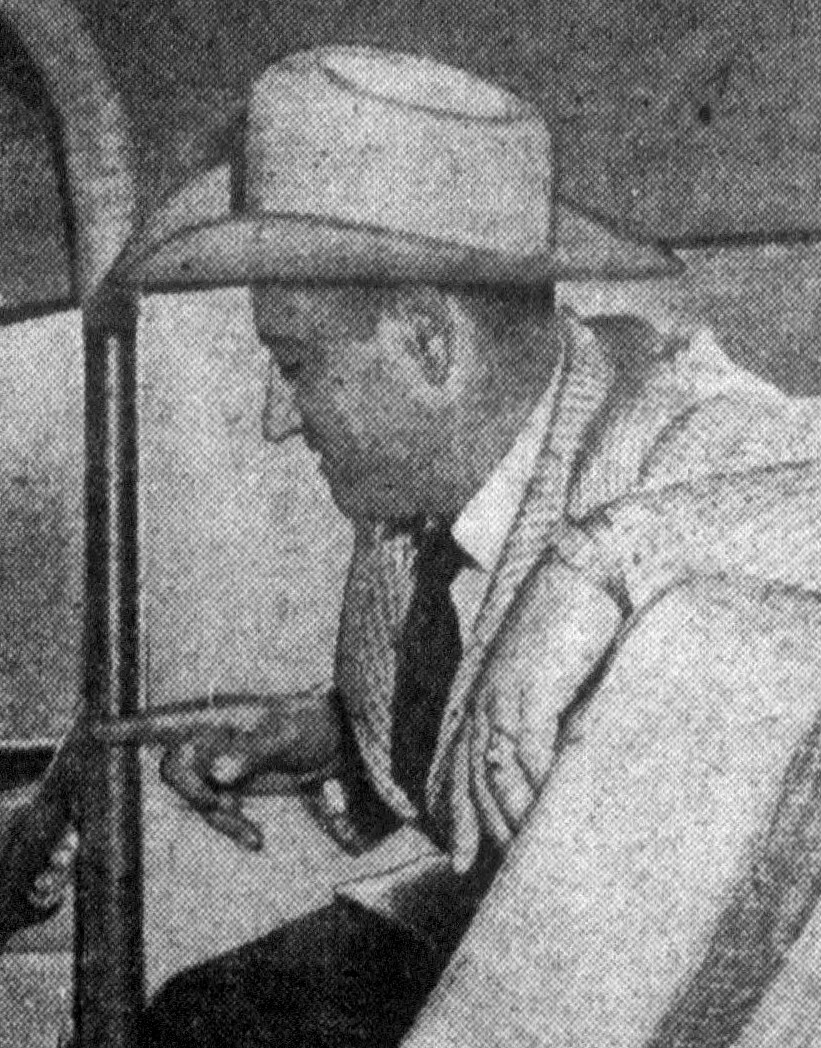
- Agajanian, circa 1953
- Born: Joshua Christopher James Agajanian; June 16, 1913; San Pedro, Los Angeles, California, U.S.
- Died: May 5, 1984 (aged 70); Gardena, California, U.S.
- Other name: Joshua James Agajanian

Joshua Christopher James "Aggie" Agajanian (June 16, 1913 – May 5, 1984) was an American motorsports promoter, race car owner, and Motorcycle Hall of Fame inductee.

== Early life ==
Agajanian was born in San Pedro, Los Angeles, California, just six months after his father had emigrated from Armenia to the United States. Agajanian grew up working for his family's refuse collecting and hog ranching businesses.

By the age of 18, Agajanian had saved enough money to buy a race car. Upon hearing the news, Agajanian's father supposedly responded, "So, you are going to be a race driver, that's fine. Just a few things I want you to do first: Go kiss your mother goodbye, pack your bags since you won't be living here anymore, and while you're at it, change your name." He then refused to grant Agajanian permission to race cars, encouraging him to be an owner.

== Auto racing activities ==
As a team owner, Agajanian was partial to the number 98, using it on his Indianapolis, Sprint and Midget cars, a tradition which has continued for generations in the family, including four Indianapolis 500 wins, including the ownership by J.C. in 1952 with driver Troy Ruttman and 1963 with driver Parnelli Jones and co-ownership by son Cary and business partner Mike Curb with Bryan Herta Autosports in 2011 with driver Dan Wheldon and 2016 with driver Alexander Rossi.

Agajanian was instrumental in the development of the air jack for faster tire changes at Indianapolis and in the 1930s was president of the Western Racing Association.

Agajanian's race organizer expertise spanned the country and he became the first race organizer to present 250 United States Automobile Club events, ranging from Midget races like the traditional Turkey Night Grand Prix at various Southern California race tracks, still promoted by the family to this day, to numerous Championship Dirt Car races at state fairground tracks.

From 1948 through 1971, Agajanian's cars won three pole positions – the first with Walt Faulkner in 1950 – for the Indianapolis 500, set four track records and won the race twice. Troy Ruttman (1952) and Parnelli Jones (1963) both won the 500 in Agajanian machines.

Agajanian also gained fame for a moment of quick thinking that may have saved victory for Parnelli Jones at Indianapolis in 1963. With the race in its waning stages and Scotsman Jim Clark closing on Jones, it became apparent that the Agajanian Willard Battery Special had developed a serious oil leak (something that USAC starter Harlan Fengler had specifically warned teams about in pre-race meetings). When Eddie Sachs crashed – allegedly in oil laid down by Jones' number 98 – Agajanian rushed up to the starter and argued that the leak was stopped, because it had dropped below the level of the crack. By this time, Lotus team owner Colin Chapman had joined the confrontation, demanding that Fengler back up his threat to disqualify cars leaking oil. By the time Jones came around again, the argument was settled. Agajanian's car stayed in the lead, and held it to the end. Chapman and the Lotus engine builder Ford were furious over the result which remains controversial to this day, although they declined to protest as Jones' car (nicknamed "Calhoun"), which had been the fastest in the race. Many experts believe that USAC officials were biased against Clark and the rear engine Lotus, and that had it been an American driving a roadster in second place at the time Jones would have been black flagged.

While promoting a race under the blazing desert sun in Arizona, Agajanian purchased a Stetson cowboy hat to protect his head, and thereafter he was rarely seen without one. His trademarks were his Stetson hat and high-heeled boots made especially for him in Spain.

== Death and family ==
Agajanian died on May 5, 1984, in Gardena, California. He is buried at Rose Hills Memorial Park in Whittier, California. His younger brother Ben Agajanian was a football placekicker for the 1956 World Champion New York Giants and the 1961 World Champion Green Bay Packers. J. C. Agajanian's nephew is musician Dennis Agajanian.

== Awards and honors ==
- Inducted into the International Motorsports Hall of Fame in 2009
- Inducted into the National Sprint Car Hall of Fame in the first class in 1990.
- Inducted into the Motorsports Hall of Fame of America in 1992.
- Inducted into the AMA Motorcycle Hall of Fame in 1999.
- Inducted into the West Coast Stock Car Hall of Fame in its first class in 2002.
- Inducted into the National Midget Auto Racing Hall of Fame.
- Inducted into the Indianapolis Motor Speedway Hall of Fame in 1990.
- Inducted into the Pikes Peak Hill Climb Museum Hall of Fame in 2016

== See also ==
- History of the Armenian Americans in Los Angeles
