= Al Smith (racing driver) =

American racing driver

Albert Smith (January 30, 1929 - June 24, 1985) was an American racing driver from Dayton, Ohio who competed in the USAC Championship Car series.

While he drove in numerous races on pavement, Smith only attempted the Indianapolis 500 once in 1967 and failed to make the field. He made 14 Champ Car starts from 1966 to 1969. His best finish was fifth place in his first Champ Car start in 1966 at the Atlanta Motor Speedway.
