= Mont-Tremblant Champ Car Grand Prix =

Annual race series held in Quebec, Canada

- Venue: Circuit Mont-Tremblant
- First race: 1967
- Last race: 2007
- Previous names: Labatt Indy (1967); Saint-Jovite 200 (1968); Mont-Tremblant Champ Car Grand Prix (2007)
- Most wins (driver): Mario Andretti (4)
- Most wins (team): Dean Van Lines Racing Division (2); Andretti Racing Enterprises (2)
- Most wins (manufacturer): Chassis: Hawk (4); Engine: Ford/Cosworth (5)

The Mont-Tremblant Champ Car Grand Prix was an auto race in the Champ Car World Series. It was held from 1967 to 1968 and again in 2007. It was held at Circuit Mont-Tremblant, in Mont-Tremblant, Quebec, Canada.

The race replaced the Grand Prix of Montreal in the Champ Car circuit, and was held in a rural zone north of Montreal. The circuit had previously held a number of significant open-wheel championship events: USAC IndyCar races in 1967 and 1968, before the establishment of the Champ Car Grand Prix; the Sports Car Club of America's Formula 5000 championship held events in 1969 and 1970; and the track held the Formula One Canadian Grand Prix in 1968 and 1970.

The only event was held on July 1, 2007, as the sixth round of the 2007 Champ Car World Series Season. Robert Doornbos won his first career Champ Car race, with Sébastien Bourdais and Will Power rounding out the podium. The unification of Champ Car and the Indy Racing League was announced on February 22, 2008, and the Mont-Tremblant Grand Prix's future was left in doubt. It was confirmed on March 5, 2008, that the race was cancelled.

== Race winners ==
Season	Date	Driver	Team	Chassis	Engine	Race Distance		Race Time	Average Speed (mph)	Report
Season	Date	Driver	Team	Chassis	Engine	Laps	Miles (km)	Race Time	Average Speed (mph)	Report
USAC Championship Car
1967	August 6	(United States) Mario Andretti	Dean Van Lines Racing Division	Hawk	Ford	36	95.400 (153.531)	1:05:41	91.353	Report
1967	August 6	(United States) Mario Andretti	Dean Van Lines Racing Division	Hawk	Ford	36	95.400 (153.531)	1:01:57	96.88	Report
1968	August 4	(United States) Mario Andretti	Andretti Racing Enterprises	Hawk	Ford	38	100.700 (162.060)	1:02:37	96.49	Report
1968	August 4	(United States) Mario Andretti	Andretti Racing Enterprises	Hawk	Ford	38	100.700 (162.060)	1:07:07	80.03	Report
1969 – 2006	Not held									
CART/Champ Car World Series
2007	July 1	(Netherlands) Robert Doornbos	Minardi Team USA	Panoz	Cosworth	62	162.502 (261.521)	1:45:41	92.245	Report
