= Marchbanks Speedway =

Former auto race track

- Location: Kings County, near Hanford, California
- Coordinates: 36.2731°N 119.5959°W
- Opened: 1951
- Closed: 1970
- Major events: USAC National Championship; California 200 (1967–1969); Hanford 250 (1968); NASCAR Grand National (1951, 1960–1961)

Dirt oval
- Surface: dirt
- Length: 0.50 mi (0.8 km)

Asphalt tri-oval
- Surface: Asphalt
- Length: 1.374 mi (2.212 km)

Marchbanks Speedway (also Hanford Motor Speedway) was a racetrack located in San Joaquin Valley near Hanford, California. It hosted open-wheel and NASCAR cars, as well as motorcycle racing, in the 1950s and 1960s. The track was subsequently demolished.

It was originally built by local farmer B. L. Marchbanks, and named after himself. The track began as a half mile dirt track. It was later paved as a 1.4-mile (2.3 km), high-banked racetrack and also hosted speed runs for watercraft in an infield lake, much as Lake Lloyd at the Daytona International Speedway does today.

Three NASCAR races were held at the track. The first was held on the dirt track in 1951. Danny Weinberg won his only NASCAR race. Marvin Porter won the race on the 1.4-mile (2.3 km) paved course in 1960. The NASCAR race record was set March 12, 1961, when Fireball Roberts led all 178 laps of a 250-mile (400 km) race, hosted at the track. He finished two laps ahead of the second place driver.

== Lap Records ==
The official race lap records at Marchbanks Speedway (Hanford Motor Speedway) are listed as:

Category	Time	Driver	Vehicle	Date
Asphalt Tri-Oval: 2.212 km (1960–1969)
USAC IndyCar	30.351	Joe Leonard	Lotus 56	1968 Hanford 250
Stock car racing	50.321	David Pearson	Pontiac Catalina	1961 Hanford NASCAR Grand National round

== Gaming ==
Hanford is included in Indianapolis 500 Evolution.
