= 1947 AAA Championship Car season =

Sports season

- AAA National Championship Trail

Season
- Races: 11
- Start date: May 30
- End date: November 2

Awards
- National champion: (United States) Ted Horn
- Indianapolis 500 winner: (United States) Mauri Rose

The 1947 AAA Championship Car season consisted of 11 races, beginning in Speedway, Indiana, on May 30 and concluding in Arlington, Texas, on November 2. The AAA National Champion was Ted Horn, and the Indianapolis 500 winner was Mauri Rose.

Shorty Cantlon died at Indianapolis during the race.

== Schedule and results ==
Rnd	Date	Race name	Track	Location	Type	Pole position	Winning driver
1	May 30	(United States) International 500 Mile Sweepstakes	Indianapolis Motor Speedway	Speedway, Indiana	Paved	(United States) Ted Horn	(United States) Mauri Rose
2	June 8	(United States) Milwaukee 100	Wisconsin State Fair Park Speedway	West Allis, Wisconsin	Dirt	(United States) Bill Holland	(United States) Bill Holland
3	June 22	(United States) Langhorne 100	Langhorne Speedway	Langhorne, Pennsylvania	Dirt	(United States) Emil Andres	(United States) Bill Holland
4	July 4	(United States) Atlanta 100^{A}	Lakewood Speedway	Atlanta, Georgia	Dirt	(United States) Rex Mays	(United States) Walt Ader
5	July 13	(United States) Bainbridge 100^{B}	Bainbridge Fairgrounds	Bainbridge, Ohio	Dirt	(United States) Walt Brown	(United States) Ted Horn
6	July 27	(United States) Milwaukee 100	Wisconsin State Fair Park Speedway	West Allis, Wisconsin	Dirt	(United States) Tony Bettenhausen	(United States) Charles Van Acker
7	August 17	(United States) George Robson Memorial	Good Time Park	Goshen, New York	Dirt	(United States) Emil Andres	(United States) Tony Bettenhausen
8	August 24	(United States) Milwaukee 100	Wisconsin State Fair Park Speedway	West Allis, Wisconsin	Dirt	(United States) Duke Dinsmore	(United States) Ted Horn
9	September 1	(United States) Pikes Peak Auto Hill Climb	Pikes Peak Highway	Pikes Peak, Colorado	Hill	(United States) Al Rogers^{C}	(United States) Louis Unser
10	September 28	(United States) Springfield 100	Illinois State Fairgrounds	Springfield, Illinois	Dirt	(United States) Emil Andres	(United States) Tony Bettenhausen
11	November 2	(United States) Arlington 100	Arlington Downs Raceway	Arlington, Texas	Dirt	(United States) Duke Nalon	(United States) Ted Horn

Paved/Dirt Oval
Road Course/Hill Climb

^A Race stopped after 77 miles due to wreck.
^B Race stopped after 90 miles due to rain.
^C No pole is awarded for the Pikes Peak Hill Climb, in this schedule on the pole is the driver who started first. No lap led was awarded for the Pikes Peak Hill Climb, however, a lap was awarded to the drivers that completed the climb.

== Final points standings ==
Note: The points became the car, when not only one driver led the car, the relieved driver became small part of the points. Points for driver method: (the points for the finish place) / (number the lap when completed the car) * (number the lap when completed the driver)

Pos	Driver	INDY (United States)	MIL1 (United States)	LHS (United States)	LAK (United States)	BAI (United States)	MIL2 (United States)	GOT (United States)	MIL3 (United States)	PIK (United States)	SPR (United States)	ARD (United States)	Pts
1	(United States) Ted Horn	**3**	DNQ	5	4	1	6	2	1		2	1	1920
2	(United States) Bill Holland RY	2	**1**	1	2	2	18	14	8		9	DNQ	1610
3	(United States) Mauri Rose	1	DNP										1000
4	(United States) Charles Van Acker	29	5	6	6	3	1	3	10		DNQ	DNQ	770
5	(United States) Rex Mays	6	2	DNS	**12**	15	10	DNP	16		16	4	765.7
6	(United States) Tony Bettenhausen	18	15	10	DNQ	4	**11**	1	4		1	10	686.8
7	(United States) Walt Brown	7	7	3	9	**13**	14	7	15		8		650
8	(United States) Emil Andres	13	8	**2**	13	7	17	**15**	5		**10**	3	575
9	(United States) George Connor	26	4	15	14	5	5	5	3		15	DNQ	560
10	(United States) Paul Russo	28	3	17	8	12	3		6		14	2	545
11	(United States) Jimmy Jackson	5											500
12	(United States) Cliff Bergere	21											393
13	(United States) Walt Ader	DNQ	17	7	1	10	12	DNQ	17		6		380
14	(United States) Duke Nalon	16					2	13	2		DNQ	**9**	350
15	(United States) Duke Dinsmore	10	12	8	11	8	15	4	**11**			13	345.5
16	(United States) Steve Truchan	DNQ	16	18			8	8	DNQ		3	11	320
17	(United States) Billy Devore	DNS	6	4	7	6	DNP						310
18	(United States) Eddie Zalucki R	DNQ		DNQ	3	11		11	14		DNQ	5	260
19	(United States) Cy Marshall	8											250
20	(United States) Milt Fankhouser R	30	13	11	5	9	DNQ	9				6	240
21	(United States) Jackie Holmes R						13	12	9		4	7	230
22	(United States) Herb Ardinger	4											207
23	(United States) Louis Unser R									1			200
24	(United States) Fred Agabashian R	9											200
25	(United States) Mel Hansen	27		DNS			4		13		13		169.5
26	(United States) Al Rogers R									**2**			160
27	(United States) Charlie Rogers		14				7				5	DNQ	160
28	(United States) Myron Fohr R		9				16		7		7		160
29	(United States) Russ Snowberger	19								3			140
30	(United States) J.C. Shoemaker R									4			120
31	(United States) Buster Warke R			16	10			6	12				120
32	(United States) Les Anderson R	11	11										120
33	(United States) Johnny Mauro R	DNQ								3			100
34	(United States) Bill Milliken R									6			80
35	(United States) Delmar Desch R									7			60
36	(United States) Hugh Thomas R									8			50
37	(United States) Johnny Byrne R											8	50
38	(United States) Pete Romcevich R	12											50
39	(United States) Buddy Rusch	DNQ	18	13	DNQ	14	9						40
40	(United States) Red Byron R	DNQ		9									40
41	(United States) George Hammond R									9			40
42	(United States) Art Scovell R	DNQ	10	14									30
43	(United States) Fred Carpenter							10					30
44	(United States) George Metzler	DNQ									11	12	30
45	(United States) Hal Robson	20	DNQ	12									10
46	(United States) Johnny Shackleford R										12	DNQ	10
-	(United States) Walt Killinger R									10			0
-	(United States) Jerry Kubik R										18	14	0
-	(United States) Frank Wearne	14											0
-	(United States) Ken Fowler	15											0
-	(United States) Norm Houser R	DNQ	DNQ								17		0
-	(United States) Roland Free	17											0
-	(United States) Joie Chitwood	22											0
-	(United States) Shorty Cantlon	23											0
-	(United States) Henry Banks	24											0
-	(United States) Al Miller	25											0
-	(United States) Louis Tomei	DNS											0
-	(United States) Doc Williams	DNS											0
-	(United States) Bud Bardowski	DNQ	DNQ		DNQ								0
-	(United States) Charles Crawford	DNQ					DNQ				DNQ		0
-	(United States) Joel Thorne	Wth		DNQ					DNQ				0
-	(United States) Zora Arkus-Duntov	DNQ		DNQ									0
-	(United States) Spider Webb			DNQ	DNQ								0
-	(United States) Sam Hanks	DNQ					DNQ						0
-	(United States) Tommy Boggs	DNQ											0
-	(United States) Frank Brisko	DNQ											0
-	(United Kingdom) Leslie Brooke	DNQ											0
-	(United States) Jim Brubaker	DNQ											0
-	(United States) Duane Carter	DNQ											0
-	(United States) Louis Durant	DNQ											0
-	(United States) Sam Grecco	DNQ											0
-	(United States) Harry McQuinn	DNQ											0
-	(United States) Hal Stetson	DNQ											0
-	(United States) George Weaver	DNQ											0
-	(United States) Elton Green											DNQ	0
-	(United States) Hal Cole	Wth											0
-	(United States) Chet Miller	Wth											0
-	(United States) Bill Sheffler	Wth											0
-	(United States) Danny Kladis	Wth											0
-	(United States) Wally Mitchell	Wth											0
-	(United States) Overton Phillips	Wth											0
-	(United States) Wayne Sankey									DSQ			0
-	(United States) Tommy Hinnershitz	DNP											0
-	(United States) Don Lee									DNP			0
Pos	Driver	INDY (United States)	MIL1 (United States)	LHS (United States)	LAK (United States)	BAI (United States)	MIL2 (United States)	GOT (United States)	MIL3 (United States)	PIK (United States)	SPR (United States)	ARD (United States)	Pts

Color	Result
Gold	Winner
Silver	2nd place
Bronze	3rd place
Green	4th & 5th place
Light Blue	6th-10th place
Dark Blue	Finished (Outside Top 10)
Purple	Did not finish (Ret)
Red	Did not qualify (DNQ)
Brown	Withdrawn (Wth)
Black	Disqualified (DSQ)
White	Did not start (DNS)
Blank	Did not participate (DNP)
Blank	Not competing

**In-line notation**
**Bold**	Pole position
Italics	Ran fastest race lap
*	Led most race laps
RY Rookie of the Year
R Rookie

== See also ==
- 1947 Indianapolis 500
