= Myron Fohr =

American racing driver (1912–1994)

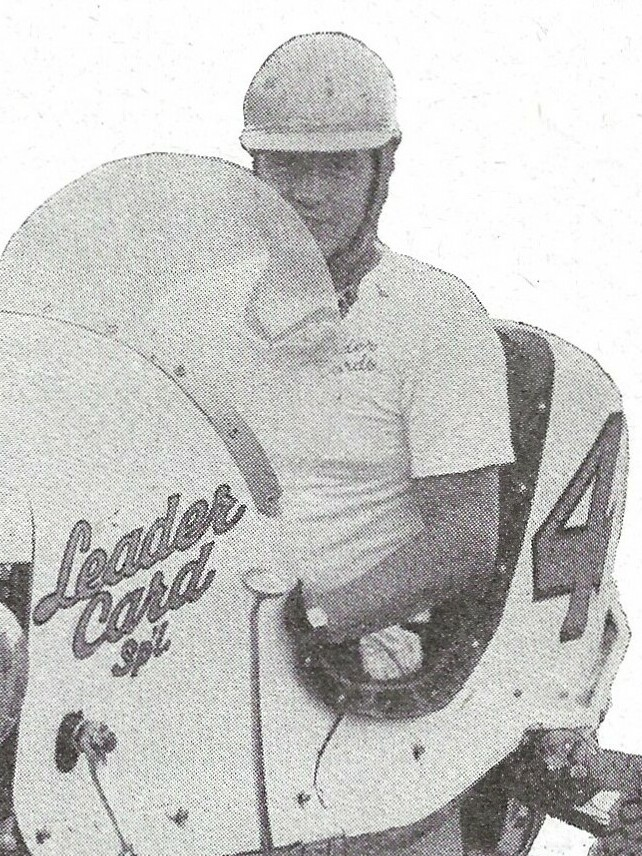
- Fohr, circa 1946
- Born: Myron William Fohr; June 17, 1912 Racine, Wisconsin, U.S.
- Died: January 14, 1994 (aged 81) Milwaukee, Wisconsin, U.S.

Champ Car career
- 25 races run over 5 years
- Best finish: 2nd (1948, 1949)
- First race: 1947 Milwaukee 100 (Milwaukee)
- Last race: 1950 Milwaukee 200 (Milwaukee)
- First win: 1948 Milwaukee 200 (Milwaukee)
- Last win: 1949 Trenton 100 (Trenton)
| Wins | Podiums | Poles |
|---|---|---|
| 4 | 9 | 2 |

Formula One World Championship career
- Active years: 1950
- Team: Marchese
- Entries: 1
- Championships: 0
- Wins: 0
- Podiums: 0
- Career points: 0
- Pole positions: 0
- Fastest laps: 0
- First entry: 1950 Indianapolis 500

Myron William Fohr (June 17, 1912 – January 14, 1994) was an American racing driver, notable for his Indy car career. He finished runner-up in the American Automobile Association (AAA) National Championship in 1948 and 1949, and twice raced in the Indianapolis 500.

== Racing career ==
Fohr made 25 AAA Championship car starts from 1947 through 1950. He won four times, twice in 1948 (at Milwaukee and Springfield) and twice in 1949 (at Milwaukee and Trenton; back-to-back rounds of the championship). He finished second in the national championship in both 1948 and 1949. Aside from a good finish in the Indianapolis 500, Fohr endured a dismal 1950 season, failing to qualify several times. His last Championship car appearances came in 1951, when he failed to qualify for both the Indianapolis 500 and the following race at the Milwaukee Mile.

Fohr won a number of AAA-sanctioned stock car feature races at his hometown track, the Milwaukee Mile. He was the winner of the inaugural race of the AAA Stock Car National Championship, held July 9, 1950.

=== World Drivers' Championship career ===
The AAA/USAC-sanctioned Indianapolis 500 was included in the FIA World Drivers' Championship from 1950 through 1960. Drivers competing at Indianapolis during those years were credited with World Drivers' Championship participation, and were eligible to score WDC points alongside those which they may have scored towards the AAA/USAC National Championship.

Fohr participated in one World Drivers' Championship race at Indianapolis. He finished in 11th place, and he scored no World Drivers' Championship points.

== Motorsports career results ==
=== Indianapolis 500 results ===
| Year | Car | Start | Qual | Rank | Finish | Laps | Led | Retired |
|---|---|---|---|---|---|---|---|---|
| 1949 | 2 | 13 | 129.776 | 3 | 4 | 200 | 0 | Running |
| 1950 | 2 | 16 | 131.714 | 11 | 11 | 133 | 0 | Flagged |
| Totals | | | | | | 333 | 0 | |

| Starts | 2 |
| Poles | 0 |
| Front Row | 0 |
| Wins | 0 |
| Top 5 | 1 |
| Top 10 | 1 |
| Retired | 0 |

=== AAA Championship Car results ===
| Year | 1 | 2 | 3 | 4 | 5 | 6 | 7 | 8 | 9 | 10 | 11 | 12 | 13 | 14 | 15 | Pos | Points |
|---|---|---|---|---|---|---|---|---|---|---|---|---|---|---|---|---|---|
| 1947 | INDY | MIL; 9 | LAN | ATL | BAI | MIL; 16 | GOS | MIL; 7 | PIK | SPR; 7 | ARL | | | | | 28th | 160 |
| 1948 | ARL | INDY; DNQ | MIL; 4 | LAN; DNS | MIL; 7 | SPR; 3 | MIL; 1 | DUQ; 2 | ATL; 2 | PIK | SPR; 1 | DUQ; 4 | | | | 2nd | 1,159 |
| 1949 | ARL; 4 | INDY; 4 | MIL; 1 | TRE; 1 | SPR; 6 | MIL; 10 | DUQ; 8 | PIK | NYS; 6 | DET; 3 | SPR; DNS | LAN | SAC; 4 | DMR; 3 | | 2nd | 1,790 |
| 1950 | INDY; 11 | MIL; DNQ | LAN | SPR; DNQ | MIL; 16 | PIK | SYR; DNQ | DET | SPR | SAC | PHX | BAY | DAR | | | 37th | 69 |
| 1951 | INDY; DNQ | MIL; DNQ | LAN | DAR | SPR | MIL | DUQ | DUQ | PIK | SYR | DET | DNC | SJS | PHX | BAY | - | 0 |
