= Walt Brown (racing driver) =

American racing driver (1910–1951)

- Born: Walter Charles Brown; December 30, 1910 Springfield, New York, U.S.
- Died: July 29, 1951 (aged 40) Carlisle, Pennsylvania, U.S.

Champ Car career
- 43+ races run over 9 years
- Best finish: 4th (1949)
- First race: 1941 Syracuse 100 (Syracuse)
- Last race: 1951 Darlington 250 (Darlington)
- First win: 1948 National Convention Sweepstakes (Langhorne)
Wins	Podiums	Poles
1	7	1

Formula One World Championship career
- Active years: 1950–1951
- Team: Kurtis Kraft
- Entries: 2
- Championships: 0
- Wins: 0
- Podiums: 0
- Career points: 0
- Pole positions: 0
- Fastest laps: 0
- First entry: 1950 Indianapolis 500
- Last entry: 1951 Indianapolis 500

Walter Charles Brown (December 30, 1910 – July 29, 1951) was an American racing driver. An Indy car specialist, his career in the big cars began in 1941, and he recorded one win, in 1948 at Langhorne Speedway.

== World Drivers' Championship career ==
The AAA/USAC-sanctioned Indianapolis 500 was included in the FIA World Drivers' Championship from 1950 through 1960. Drivers competing at Indianapolis during those years were credited with World Drivers' Championship participation, and were eligible to score WDC points alongside those which they may have scored towards the AAA/USAC National Championship.

Brown participated in two World Drivers' Championship races at Indianapolis. His best finish was 19th place, and he scored no World Drivers' Championship points.

== Death ==
Brown died in a low speed accident at Williams Grove Speedway on 29 July 1951, the day widely known as "Black Sunday" because two other drivers also died (in consecutive qualifying runs at Funk's Speedway in Winchester, Indiana) on the same day.

== Motorsports career results ==
=== Indianapolis 500 results ===
Year	Car	Start	Qual	Rank	Finish	Laps	Led	Retired
1947	33	14	118.355	25	7	200	0	Running
1950	4	20	130.454	22	19	127	0	Flagged
1951	44	13	131.907	31	26	55	0	Magneto
Totals						382	0	

Starts	3
Poles	0
Front Row	0
Wins	0
Top 5	0
Top 10	1
Retired	1

=== AAA Championship Car results ===
Year	1	2	3	4	5	6	7	8	9	10	11	12	13	14	15	Pos	Points
1946	INDY	LAN; 7	ATL	ISF	MIL	GOS										30th	186
1947	INDY; 7	MIL; 7	LAN; 3	ATL; 9	BAI; 13	MIL; 14	GOS; 7	MIL; 15	PIK	SPR; 8	ARL					7th	650
1948	ARL; DNQ	INDY; DNQ	MIL; 13	LAN; 1	MIL; 13	SPR; 8	MIL; 12	DUQ	ATL	PIK	SPR; 8	DUQ				16th	320
1949	ARL	INDY; DNS	MIL; 10	TRE; 3	SPR; 7	MIL; 2	DUQ; 5	PIK	SYR; 4	DET; 8	SPR; 5	LAN; 11	SAC; 6	DMR; 6		4th	1,281
1950	INDY; 19	MIL; 15	LAN; DNS	SPR; 16	MIL; DNQ	PIK	SYR; 13	DET; DNQ	SPR; 10	SAC	PHX	BAY	DAR; 19			42nd	41.5
1951	INDY; 26	MIL; DNQ	LAN; DNS	DAR; 10	SPR	MIL	DUQ	DUQ	PIK	SYR	DET	DNC	SJS	PHX	BAY	51st	17

- 1946 table only includes results of the six races run to "championship car" specifications. Points total includes the 71 races run to "big car" specifications.

=== FIA World Drivers' Championship results ===
(key)

Year	Entrant	Chassis	Engine	1	2	3	4	5	6	7	8	WDC	Points
1950	Tuffy's Offy	Kurtis Kraft	Offenhauser L4	GBR	MON	500; 19	SUI	BEL	FRA	ITA		NC	0
1951	Federal Engineering	Kurtis Kraft	Offenhauser L4	SUI	500; 26	BEL	FRA	GBR	GER	ITA	ESP	NC	0
