= Charles Van Acker =

Belgian–American racing driver (1912–1998)

- Van Acker in 1947
- Born: Charles Edward Van Acker Sr. March 14, 1912 Brussels, Belgium
- Died: May 31, 1998 (aged 86) Grand Blanc, Michigan, U.S.

Champ Car career
- 25+ races run over 5 years
- Years active: 1946–1950
- Best finish: 4th – 1947
- First race: 1946 Winchester Race 3 (Winchester)
- Last race: 1949 Springfield 100 (Springfield)
- First win: 1946 Winchester Race 4 (Winchester)
- Last win: 1947 Milwaukee 100 (Milwaukee)
Wins	Podiums	Poles
2	5	0

Formula One World Championship career
- Active years: 1950
- Team: Stevens
- Entries: 1 (0 starts)
- Championships: 0
- Wins: 0
- Podiums: 0
- Career points: 0
- Pole positions: 0
- Fastest laps: 0
- First entry: 1950 Indianapolis 500
- Last entry: 1950 Indianapolis 500

Charles Edward "Poncho" Van Acker Sr. (14 March 1912 Brussels – 31 May 1998 South Bend, Indiana) was a Belgian-American racing driver. He first attempted to qualify for the Indianapolis 500 in 1946, but was too slow. In 1947, he made the race and finished in 29th after a crash on lap 24. He also competed in seven more races of the national trail that season and finished fourth in points. In 1948, he finished 11th in the Indy 500 and tenth in the National Championship. 1949 saw him crash ten laps into the Indy 500 and struggle to qualify much of the rest of the season. He attempted the 1950 Indianapolis 500 but failed to qualify in what would be his last Championship Car appearance. He owned and operated the South Bend Motor Speedway in South Bend, Indiana and once after a dirt track crash in Dayton, Ohio was declared dead. However, Van Acker claims that the reports were exaggerated and that he was not that seriously injured.

== Motorsports career results ==
=== Complete AAA Championship Car results ===
Year	1	2	3	4	5	6	7	8	9	10	11	12	13	14	Pos	Points
1946	INDY; DNQ	LAN; DNP	ATL	ISF	MIL	GOS									-	0
1947	INDY; 29	MIL; 5	LAN; 6	ATL; 6	BAI; 3	MIL; 1	GOS; 3	MIL; 10	PIK	SPR; DNQ	ARL; DNQ				4th	770
1948	ARL	INDY; 11	MIL; 5	LAN; 7	MIL; 9	SPR; 5	MIL; 6	DUQ; 4	ATL; 9	PIK	SPR; 12	DUQ; 10			10th	760
1949	ARL	INDY; 31	MIL; DNQ	TRE	SPR; 11	MIL; 9	DUQ; 10	PIK	SYR; DNQ	DET; DNQ	SPR; 8	LAN	SAC	DMR	26th	180
1950	INDY; DNQ	MIL	LAN	SPR	MIL	PIK	SYR	DET	SPR	SAC	PHX	BAY	DAR		-	0

=== Indianapolis 500 results ===
Year	Car	Start	Qual	Rank	Finish	Laps	Led	Retired
1947	44	24	121.049	16	29	24	0	Crash FS
1948	4	12	125.440	13	11	192	0	Flagged
1949	10	27	126.524	28	31	10	0	Crash T4
**Totals**						226	0	

Starts	3
Poles	0
Front Row	0
Wins	0
Top 5	0
Top 10	0
Retired	2

=== Complete Formula One World Championship results ===
(key) (Races in bold indicate pole position; races in italics indicate fastest lap)

Year	Entrant	Chassis	Engine	1	2	3	4	5	6	7	WDC	Pts
1950	Redmer	Stevens	Offenhauser L4	GBR	MON	500; DNQ	SUI	BEL	FRA	ITA	NC	0
