= Al Rogers =

American racing driver (1909–1984)

- Born: Alfred C. Rogers; March 1, 1909 Pekin, Illinois, U.S.
- Died: December 5, 1984 (aged 75) Colorado Springs, Colorado, U.S.

Championship titles
- 1940, 1948, 1949, 1950, 1951; Pikes Peak International Hill Climb Winner

Champ Car career
- 8 races run over 8 years
- Years active: 1947–1954
- Best finish: 24th (tie) – 1948, 1949
- First race: 1947 Pikes Peak Hill Climb (Pikes Peak)
- Last race: 1954 Pikes Peak Hill Climb (Pikes Peak)
- First win: 1948 Pikes Peak Hill Climb (Pikes Peak)
- Last win: 1951 Pikes Peak Hill Climb (Pikes Peak)
Wins	Podiums	Poles
4	7	5

Alfred C. Rogers (March 1, 1909 – December 5, 1984) was an American race car driver from Pekin, Illinois. He won the Pikes Peak International Hill Climb four times between 1947 and 1954, when he was part of the AAA Championship Car. Rogers has a total of five victories, the first being obtained before World War II, in 1940. He died on December 5, 1984, in Colorado Springs, Colorado.

== Awards and honors ==
- Pikes Peak Hill Climb Museum Hall of Fame (1997)

== Complete AAA Championship Car results ==
(key) (Races in bold indicate pole position)

Year	1	2	3	4	5	6	7	8	9	10	11	12	13	14	15	Rank	Points
1947	INDY	MIL	LAN	ATL	BAI	MIL	GOS	MIL	PIK; 2	SPR	ARL					26th	160
1948	ARL	INDY; DNQ	MIL; DNQ	LAN	MIL	SPR	MIL	DUQ	ATL	PIK; 1	SPR	DUQ				24th	200
1949	ARL	INDY	MIL	TRE	SPR	MIL	DUQ	PIK; 1	SYR	DET	SPR	LAN	SAC	DMR		25th	200
1950	INDY	MIL	LAN	SPR	MIL	PIK; 1	SYR	DET	SPR	SAC	PHX	BAY	DAR			25th	200
1951	INDY	MIL	LAN	DAR	SPR	MIL	DUQ	DUQ	PIK; 1	SYR	DET	DNC	SJS	PHX	BAY	29th	200
1952	INDY	MIL	RAL	SPR	MIL	DET	DUQ	PIK; 3	SYR	DNC	SJS	PHX				27th	140
1953	INDY	MIL	SPR	DET	SPR	MIL	DUQ	PIK; 3	SYR	ISF	SAC	PHX				29th	140
1954	INDY	MIL	LAN	DAR	SPR	MIL	DUQ	PIK; 8	SYR	ISF	SAC	PHX	LVG			41st	50
