= Fred Agabashian =

American racing driver (1913–1989)

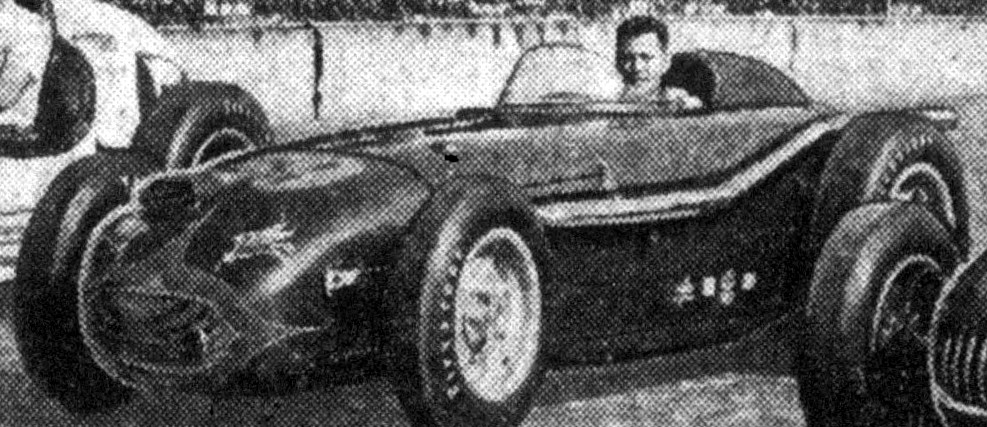
- Agabashian at Indianapolis Motor Speedway in 1953
- Born: Fred Levon Agabashian; August 21, 1913 Modesto, California, U.S.
- Died: October 13, 1989 (aged 76) Alamo, California, U.S.

Champ Car career
- 28 races run over 12 years
- Years active: 1947–1958
- Best finish: 14th – 1950, 1954
- First race: 1947 Indianapolis 500 (Indianapolis)
- Last race: 1957 Rex Mays Classic (Milwaukee)
- First win: 1949 Golden State 100 (Sacramento)
Wins	Podiums	Poles
1	1	2

Formula One World Championship career
- Active years: 1950–1958
- Team(s): Maserati, Kurtis Kraft
- Entries: 9 (8 starts)
- Championships: 0
- Wins: 0
- Podiums: 0
- Career points: 1.5
- Pole positions: 1
- Fastest laps: 0
- First entry: 1950 Indianapolis 500
- Last entry: 1958 Indianapolis 500

Fred Levon Agabashian (August 21, 1913 – October 13, 1989) was an American racer of midget cars and Indy cars.

== Career ==
=== Midget car racing ===
Agabashian competed in his first midget car race in his teens. His first championship was the 1937 Northern California Racing Association against such drivers as Duane Carter, Lynn Deister, and Paul Swedberg. He captured the 1946 BCRA championship for Jack London. He won the 1947 and 1948 BCRA championships for George Bignotti.

=== Championship racing ===
Agabashian qualified for his first Indianapolis 500 in 1947 and finished ninth. He made the next 11 500s with a best finish of fourth in 1953, the extremely hot race day where he was relieved by Paul Russo. He qualified on the pole in 1952 in the Cummins Diesel Special, the first turbocharged Indy race car, but it dropped out after 71 laps.

Agabashian won one Championship race, a 100-mile contest at the Fairgrounds in Sacramento, CA in 1949.

Agabashian retired from the sport after failing to qualify at Indianapolis in 1958.

== Broadcaster ==
After his retirement, Agabashian did color commentary for the Indianapolis Motor Speedway Radio Network, serving from 1959 to 1965 and again from 1973 to 1977.

== Death ==
Agabashian died on 13 October 1989 at Alamo, California and was cremated.

== Recognition ==
Agabashian was inducted in the National Midget Auto Racing Hall of Fame, and in 2005, the Indianapolis Motor Speedway Hall of Fame.

== Racing record ==
=== Complete AAA/USAC Championship Car results ===
(key) (Races in bold indicate pole position)

Year	Team	1	2	3	4	5	6	7	8	9	10	11	12	13	14	15	Rank	Points	Ref
1947	Ross Page Offenhauser	INDY; 9	MIL	LAN	ATL	BAI	MIL	GOS	MIL	PIK	SPR	ARL					24th	200	
1948	Ross Page	ARL	INDY; 23	MIL	LAN	MIL	SPR	MIL	DUQ	ATL	PIK	SPR	DUQ				NC	0	
1949	IRC Maserati	ARL	INDY; 27	MIL	TRE	SPR	MIL	DQSF	PIK	SYR	DET	SPR	LAN				24th	200	
1949	J.C. Agajanian													**SAC**; 1	DMR		24th	200	
1950	Kurtis Kraft	INDY; 28	MIL; 8	LAN; 6	SPR; 8	MIL; 8	PIK	SYR; 6		SPR; 4	SAC; 5	PHX	BAY; 13	DAR			14th	532.5	
1950	Lou Rassey								DET; DNQ								14th	532.5	
1951	Andy Granatelli	INDY; 17	MIL; DNQ	LAN; 6	DAR; DNQ	SPR	MIL	DUQ	DUQ	PIK	SYR	DET					25th	278.2	
1951	Pat Clancy												DNC; 6	SJS; 6	PHX; 17		25th	278.2	
1951	J.C. Agajanian															BAY; 12	25th	278.2	
1952	Cummins Engines	**INDY**; 27	MIL	RAL	SPR												35th	80	
1952	J.C. Agajanian					MIL; 9	DET	DQSF	PIK	SYR	DNC	SJS	PHX				35th	80	
1953	Grancor Auto	INDY; 4	MIL	SPR	DET	SPR	MIL	DQSF	PIK	SYR	ISF	SAC	PHX				19th	315	
1954	Charlie Merz	INDY; 6	MIL	LAN	DAR	SPR											14th	460	
1954	Bardahl Oil Company						MIL; 10	DQSF	PIK	SYR	ISF	SAC	PHX	LVG			14th	460	
1955	Federal Engineering	INDY; 32	MIL	LAN	SPR	MIL	DQSF	PIK	SYR	ISF	SAC	PHX					NC	0	
1956	Federal Engineering	INDY; 12	MIL	LAN	DAR	ATL	SPR	MIL	DQSF	SYR	ISF	SAC	PHX				32nd	50	
1957	George Bignotti	INDY; 22	LAN	MIL; 17	DET	ATL	SPR	MIL	DQSF	SYR	ISF	TRE	SAC	PHX			NC	0	
1958	City of Memphis	TRE	INDY; DNQ	MIL	LAN	ATL	SPR	MIL	DQSF	SYR	ISF	TRE	SAC	PHX			NC	0	

=== Indianapolis 500 results ===
Year	Car	Start	Qual	Rank	Finish	Laps	Led	Retired
1947	41	23	121.478	13	9	191	0	Flagged
1948	26	32	122.737	28	23	58	0	Oil line
1949	15	31	127.007	25	27	38	0	Overheating
1950	28	2	132.792	3	28	64	0	Oil line
1951	59	11	135.029	6	17	109	0	Clutch
1952	28	1	138.010	3	27	71	0	Clogged air intake
1953	59	2	137.546	4	4	200	1	Running
1954	77	24	137.746	30	6	200	0	Running
1955	14	4	141.933	2	32	39	0	Spun T2
1956	42	7	144.069	8	12	196	0	Flagged
1957	14	4	142.557	8	22	107	0	Fuel leak
**Totals**						1273	1	

Starts	11
Poles	1
Front Row	3
Wins	0
Top 5	1
Top 10	3
Retired	7

=== Complete Formula One World Championship results ===
(key)

Year	Entrant	Chassis	Engine	1	2	3	4	5	6	7	8	9	10	11	WDC	Pts
1950	Indianapolis Race Cars	Maserati 8CL	Offenhauser 3.0 L4s	GBR	MON	500; 25	SUI	BEL	FRA	ITA					NC	0
1951	Granatelli-Bardahl/Grancor	Kurtis Kraft 3000	Offenhauser 4.5 L4	SUI	500; 17	BEL	FRA	GBR	GER	ITA	ESP				NC	0
1952	Cummins Diesel	Kurtis Kraft	Cummins 3.0 L6s	SUI	**500**; 27	BEL	FRA	GBR	GER	NED	ITA				NC	0
1953	Grancor-Elgin Piston Pin	Kurtis Kraft 500B	Offenhauser 4.5 L4	ARG	500; 4	NED	BEL	FRA	GBR	GER	SUI	ITA			18th	1.5
1954	Merz Engineering/Milt Marion	Kurtis Kraft 500C	Offenhauser 4.5 L4	ARG	500; 6	BEL	FRA	GBR	GER	SUI	ITA	ESP			NC	0
1955	Federal Engineering	Kurtis Kraft 500C	Offenhauser 4.5 L4	ARG	MON	500; 32	BEL	NED	GBR	ITA					NC	0
1956	Federal Engineering	Kurtis Kraft 500C	Offenhauser 4.5 L4	ARG	MON	500; 12	BEL	FRA	GBR	GER	ITA				NC	0
1957	Bowes Seal Fast/Bignotti	Kurtis Kraft 500G	Offenhauser 4.5 L4	ARG	MON	500; 22	FRA	GBR	GER	PES	ITA				NC	0
1958	City of Memphis	Kurtis Kraft 500G	Offenhauser 4.5 L4	ARG	MON	NED	500; DNQ	BEL	FRA	GBR	GER	POR	ITA	MOR	NC	0
