= Louis Unser =

American racing driver (1896–1979)

- Born: Louis Unser Jr. March 16, 1896 Alton, Illinois, U.S.
- Died: October 18, 1979 (aged 83) Colorado Springs, Colorado, U.S.

Championship titles
- Major victories Pikes Peak Hill Climb (1934, 1936, 1937, 1938, 1939, 1941, 1946, 1947, 1953)

Champ Car career
- 10 races run over 10 years
- Best finish: 23rd (tie) (1947)
- First race: 1947 Pikes Peak Hill Climb (Pikes Peak)
- Last race: 1965 Pikes Peak Hill Climb (Pikes Peak)
- First win: 1947 Pikes Peak Hill Climb (Pikes Peak)
- Last win: 1953 Pikes Peak Hill Climb (Pikes Peak)
Wins	Podiums	Poles
2	6	1

Louis Unser Jr. (March 16, 1896 – October 18, 1979) was an American racing driver. He was the patriarch of the Unser family of American auto racers. He was renowned for his hill-climbing career, winning the Pikes Peak Hill Climb nine times between 1934 and 1953.

== Oldest Indy car driver ==
Unser is officially the oldest ever Indy car driver to have started a race. He raced the 1965 Pikes Peak Hill Climb at the age of 69 years 3 months and 19 days, however his record is often given to A. J. Foyt, who competed in the 1992 Indianapolis 500 at the age of 57 years 4 months and 8 days.

Unser is also the oldest Indy car winner. He won the 1953 Pikes Peak Hill Climb at the age of 57 years 5 months and 22 days, however his record is often given to Mario Andretti, who won at Phoenix in 1993 at the age of 53 years 1 month and 7 days.

== Burial ==
Unser is buried at the Fairview Cemetery in Colorado Springs, Colorado.

== Awards and honors ==
- Pikes Peak Hill Climb Museum Hall of Fame (1997)
- Motorsports Hall of Fame of America (2025)

== Motorsports career results ==
=== AAA Championship Car results ===
(key) (Races in bold indicate pole position)

Year	1	2	3	4	5	6	7	8	9	10	11	12	13	14	15	16	17	18	Rank	Points
1947	INDY	MIL	LAN	ATL	BAI	MIL	GOS	MIL	PIK; 1	SPR	ARL								23rd	200
1948	ARL	INDY	MIL	LAN	MIL	SPR	MIL	DUQ	ATL	PIK; 7	SPR	DUQ							42nd	60
1949	ARL	INDY	MIL	TRE	SPR	MIL	DUQ	PIK; 2	SYR	DET	SPR	LAN	SAC	DMR					27th	160
1950	INDY	MIL	LAN	SPR	MIL	PIK; 3	SYR	DET	SPR	SAC	PHX	BAY	DAR						29th	140
1951	INDY	MIL	LAN	DAR	SPR	MIL	DUQ	DUQ	PIK; 3	SYR	DET	DNC	SJS	PHX	BAY				33rd	140
1952	INDY	MIL	RAL	SPR	MIL	DET	DUQ	PIK; 2	SYR	DNC	SJS	PHX							25th	160
1953	INDY	MIL	SPR	DET	SPR	MIL	DUQ	PIK; 1	SYR	ISF	SAC	PHX							25th	200
1954	INDY	MIL	LAN	DAR	SPR	MIL	DUQ	PIK; 18	SYR	ISF	SAC	PHX	LVG						-	0
1955	INDY	MIL	LAN	SPR	MIL	DUQ	PIK; 11	SYR	ISF	SAC	PHX								51st	20
1965	PHX	TRE	INDY	MIL	LAN	PPR; 12	TRE	IRP	ATL	LAN	MIL	ISF	MIL	DSF	INF	TRE	SAC	PHX	56th	5

== See also ==
- Unser (disambiguation) for other family members who were race car drivers
