= George Hammond (racing driver) =

American racing driver (1903–1981)

- Born: George Bruff Hammond; October 21, 1903 Darlington, Missouri, U.S.
- Died: February 18, 1981 (aged 77) Colorado Springs, Colorado, U.S.

Championship titles
- 1952 Pikes Peak International Hill Climb Winner

Champ Car career
- 8 races run over 9 years
- Years active: 1947–1955
- Best finish: 24th – 1952
- First race: 1947 Pikes Peak Hill Climb (Pikes Peak)
- Last race: 1955 Pikes Peak Hill Climb (Pikes Peak)
- First win: 1952 Pikes Peak Hill Climb (Pikes Peak)
| Wins | Podiums | Poles |
|---|---|---|
| 1 | 1 | 0 |

George Bruff Hammond (October 21, 1903 – February 18, 1981) was an American race car driver from Colorado Springs, Colorado. He won the Pikes Peak International Hill Climb in 1952, when he was part of the AAA Championship Car. His victory in the 1952 race was commented on by LIFE magazine: "On Labor Day, he swept to victory in the thrilling and dangerous Pike's Peak Climb, where a slip or a skid could mean death or serious injury, against a field of fast, experienced drivers." Hammond has a total of eight races, between 1947 and 1955 in AAA Championship.

== Complete AAA Championship Car results ==
(key) (Races in bold indicate pole position)

| Year | 1 | 2 | 3 | 4 | 5 | 6 | 7 | 8 | 9 | 10 | 11 | 12 | 13 | 14 | 15 | Rank | Points |
|---|---|---|---|---|---|---|---|---|---|---|---|---|---|---|---|---|---|
| 1947 | INDY | MIL | LAN | ATL | BAI | MIL | GOS | MIL | PIK; 9 | SPR | ARL | | | | | 41st | 40 |
| 1948 | ARL | INDY | MIL | LAN | MIL | SPR | MIL | DUQ | ATL | PIK; 13 | SPR | DUQ | | | | - | 0 |
| 1949 | ARL | INDY | MIL | TRE | SPR | MIL | DUQ | PIK; 4 | SYR | DET | SPR | LAN | SAC | DMR | | 35th | 120 |
| 1950 | INDY | MIL | LAN | SPR | MIL | PIK; 4 | SYR | DET | SPR | SAC | PHX | BAY | DAR | | | 31st | 120 |
| 1951 | INDY | MIL | LAN | DAR | SPR | MIL | DUQ | DUQ | PIK; 25 | SYR | DET | DNC | SJS | PHX | BAY | - | 0 |
| 1952 | INDY | MIL | RAL | SPR | MIL | DET | DUQ | PIK; 1 | SYR | DNC | SJS | PHX | | | | 24th | 200 |
| 1953 | INDY | MIL | SPR | DET | SPR | MIL | DUQ | PIK; 18 | SYR | ISF | SAC | PHX | | | | - | 0 |
| 1954 | INDY | MIL | LAN | DAR | SPR | MIL | DUQ | PIK; DNQ | SYR | ISF | SAC | PHX | LVG | | | - | 0 |
| 1955 | INDY | MIL | LAN | SPR | MIL | DUQ | PIK; 10 | SYR | ISF | SAC | PHX | | | | | 49th | 30 |
