= Unser =

Unser is a surname, and may refer to:

== People with the name ==
- The Unser family, a prominent family of American auto racing drivers:
  - First generation:
    - Louis Unser (1896-1979), a nine-time winner of the Pikes Peak Hillclimb.
  - Second generation (all brothers, and also nephews of Louis):
    - Jerry Unser Jr. (1932–1959)
    - Bobby Unser (1934–2021)
    - Al Unser (1939–2021)
  - Third generation:
    - Johnny Unser (born 1958), son of Jerry
    - Al Unser Jr. (born 1962), son of Al
    - Robby Unser (born 1968), son of Bobby
  - Fourth generation:
    - Al Unser III (born 1982), son of Al Jr.
- Father-and-son American baseball players:
  - Al Unser (1912–1995)
  - Del Unser (born 1944)

== Fictional characters ==
- Wayne Unser, a fictional character on the FX television series Sons of Anarchy

== See also ==
- Al Unser (disambiguation)
