= Walter Mitchell =

Walter Mitchell may refer to:

- Wally Mitchell (1908–1974), Australian rules footballer who played with Fitzroy
- Walter Mitchell (2013 character), fictional character from Neighbours introduced in 2013
- Walter Mitchell (2016 character), fictional character from Neighbours introduced in 2016
- Walter Mitchell (politician), mayor of Halifax, Nova Scotia, 1937–40
- Walter Mitchell (bishop) (died 1971), Missionary Bishop of Arizona
- Walter George Mitchell (1877–1935), Canadian lawyer and politician
