= 1950 AAA Championship Car season =

Sports season

- AAA National Championship Trail

Season
- Races: 13
- Start date: May 30
- End date: December 10

Awards
- National champion: (United States) Henry Banks
- Indianapolis 500 winner: (United States) Johnnie Parsons

The 1950 AAA Championship Car season consisted of 13 races, beginning in Speedway, Indiana on May 30 and concluding in Darlington, South Carolina on December 10. There were also two non-championship events. The AAA National Champion was Henry Banks, and the Indianapolis 500 winner was Johnnie Parsons.

== Schedule and results ==
Rnd	Date	Race name	Track	Location	Type	Pole position	Winning driver
NC	May 1	(United States) MGM Sweepstakes	Arlington Downs Raceway	Arlington, Texas	Dirt	(United States) Jimmy Davies	(United States) Duane Carter
1	May 30	(United States) International 500 Mile Sweepstakes^{A}	Indianapolis Motor Speedway	Speedway, Indiana	Paved	(United States) Walt Faulkner	(United States) Johnnie Parsons
2	June 11	(United States) Rex Mays Classic	Wisconsin State Fair Park Speedway	West Allis, Wisconsin	Dirt	(United States) Lee Wallard	(United States) Tony Bettenhausen
3	June 25	(United States) Langhorne 100	Langhorne Speedway	Langhorne, Pennsylvania	Dirt	(United States) Troy Ruttman	(United States) Jack McGrath
NC	August 12	(United States) Indianapolis Sweepstakes	Williams Grove Speedway	Mechanicsburg, Pennsylvania	Dirt	(United States) Lee Wallard	(United States) Troy Ruttman
4	August 19	(United States) Springfield 100	Illinois State Fairgrounds	Springfield, Illinois	Dirt	(United States) Tony Bettenhausen	(United States) Paul Russo
5	September 4	(United States) Milwaukee 200	Wisconsin State Fair Park Speedway	West Allis, Wisconsin	Dirt	(United States) Chuck Stevenson	(United States) Walt Faulkner
6	September 4	(United States) Pikes Peak Auto Hill Climb	Pikes Peak Highway	Pikes Peak, Colorado	Hill	(United States) Al Rogers^{B}	(United States) Al Rogers
7	September 9	(United States) Syracuse 100	Syracuse Mile	Syracuse, New York	Dirt	(United States) Tony Bettenhausen	(United States) Jack McGrath
8	September 10	(United States) Detroit 100	Michigan State Fairgrounds Speedway	Detroit, Michigan	Dirt	(United States) Troy Ruttman	(United States) Henry Banks
9	October 1	(United States) Springfield 100	Illinois State Fairgrounds	Springfield, Illinois	Dirt	(United States) Tony Bettenhausen	(United States) Tony Bettenhausen
10	October 15	(United States) Golden State 100	California State Fairgrounds	Sacramento, California	Dirt	(United States) Tony Bettenhausen	(United States) Duke Dinsmore
11	November 12	(United States) Phoenix 100	Arizona State Fairgrounds	Phoenix, Arizona	Dirt	(United States) Bobby Ball	(United States) Jimmy Davies
12	November 26	(United States) Bay Meadows 150	Bay Meadows Race Track	San Mateo, California	Dirt	(United States) Tony Bettenhausen	(United States) Tony Bettenhausen
13	December 10	(United States) Darlington 200	Darlington Raceway	Darlington, South Carolina	Paved	(United States) Bill Schindler	(United States) Johnnie Parsons

Paved/Dirt Oval
Road Course/Hill Climb
Non-championship race

^A Indianapolis 500 was AAA-sanctioned and counted towards the 1950 FIA World Championship of Drivers title. Race stopped after 345 miles due to rain.
^B No pole is awarded for the Pikes Peak Hill Climb, in this schedule on the pole is the driver who started first. No lap led was awarded for the Pikes Peak Hill Climb, however, a lap was awarded to the drivers that completed the climb.

== Final points standings ==
Note1: The points became the car, when not only one driver led the car, the relieved driver became small part of the points. Points for driver method: (the points for the finish place) / (number the lap when completed the car) * (number the lap when completed the driver)

Note2: There were scoring omissions in the AAA records regarding laps completed for eight drivers in the Springfield and Bay Meadows races in 1950. The statistics shown include the most accurate representation of those races that is available.

Pos	Driver	INDY (United States)	MIL1 (United States)	LHS (United States)	SPR1 (United States)	MIL2 (United States)	PIK (United States)	SYR (United States)	MSF (United States)	SPR2 (United States)	CSF (United States)	ASF (United States)	BME (United States)	DAR (United States)	Pts
1	(United States) Henry Banks	25	5	2	DNQ	2		DNQ	1	18	3	12	4	3	1390
2	(United States) Walt Faulkner RY	**7**	7	DNQ	DNQ	1		2	4	12	9	5	6	8	1317
3	(United States) Johnnie Parsons	1	11	DNS	DNQ	DNS		DNQ	16	DNQ	11	3	DNQ	1	1313
4	(United States) Cecil Green R	4	DNQ	9	DNQ	12		4	3	5	10	6	9	4	1190
5	(United States) Tony Bettenhausen	31	1	14	**11**	18		**12**	10	**1**	**17**	2	**1**	20	1027.5
6	(United States) Duke Dinsmore	33	14	4	7	4		10	5	11	1	18	7	5	1017
7	(United States) Paul Russo	9	2	12	1	5		3	18	6	13	16			928
8	(United States) Chuck Stevenson		DNS	3	DNQ	**20**			6	3	4	4	19	6	760
9	(United States) Jack McGrath	14	9	1	14	DNS		1	17	14	14	9	5	9	736.5
10	(United States) Bill Schindler	26	18	16	12	22		DNS	15	15	2	DNQ	3	**2**	690
11	(United States) Lee Wallard	6	**4**	DNS	2	15		DNQ	DNQ					10	637
12	(United States) Jimmy Davies	17	3	11	10	21		15	2	8	15	1	14		605.5
13	(United States) Bill Holland	2													552
14	(United States) Fred Agabashian	28	8	6	8	8		6	DNQ	4	5		13		532.5
15	(United States) Mauri Rose	3													483
16	(United States) Andy Linden R	DNQ		18	5	3		DNS	8	DNQ	DNS				459.5
17	(United States) Duke Nalon	DNQ	DNQ	5	DNQ	6		8	13		7	7	DNQ		394
18	(United States) Mack Hellings	13	13	7	3	DNQ	DNQ	DNQ	14	9	6	11	DNS	DNQ	340
19	(United States) Joie Chitwood	5												7	337.5
20	(United States) George Connor	8	10	DNQ	9	19		17	9	13					282.5
21	(United States) Cliff Griffith R	DNQ	DNQ	DNS	4			5	DNQ	DNQ				12	255
22	(United States) Ray Knepper R				DNQ	11		7	DNQ	7	8	13	10	16	255
23	(United States) Sam Hanks	30	DNQ										2		240
24	(United States) Joe James R	DNQ	DNQ	DNS	DNQ	7		DNQ	7	17	DNQ	DNQ	11	13	212.5
25	(United States) Al Rogers						**1**								200
26	(United States) Neal Carter			15	DNQ	17		16	12	2	16			14	170
27	(United States) Harry Turner R			DNS	6	9		9	DNQ	DNQ					164.5
28	(United States) Herb Bryers						2								160
29	(United States) Louis Unser						3								140
30	(United States) Bill Mackey R							DNQ	DNQ			8	8	22	125
31	(United States) George Hammond						4								120
32	(United States) Jerry Hoyt R	21	DNQ	8	DNQ			11		DNQ				11	110
33	(United States) Pat Flaherty R	10													103.5
34	(United States) Charles Bryant						5								100
35	(United States) Dick Rathmann	32	6	13				DNS							80
36	(United States) Walt Killinger						6								80
37	(United States) Myron Fohr	11	DNQ		DNQ	16		DNQ							69
38	(United States) Lloyd Axel						7								60
39	(United States) Frank Burany		DNQ			10									60
40	(United States) Joel Thorne	DNQ					8								50
41	(United States) Troy Ruttman	15	17	**10**	DNQ	13		14	**11**		12	17	15	18	46
42	(United States) Walt Brown	19	15	DNS	16	DNQ		13	DNQ	10				19	41.5
43	(United States) Johnny Mauro	DNQ					9								40
44	(United States) Bayliss Levrett	27									DNS	DNQ	DNQ	DNQ	36
45	(United States) Duane Carter	12	DNQ	DNP	17		DNS	DNS						21	34.5
46	(United States) Shelby Hill R						10								30
47	(United States) Rodger Ward R											10			30
48	(United States) Delmar Desch						11								20
49	(United States) Bobby Ball R											**15**	12	DNQ	15
50	(United States) Jimmy Good						12								10
51	(United States) Ralph Pratt	DNQ	DNQ	DNS	15	DNQ		DNS		DNQ					9.5
52	(United States) Johnny McDowell	18	12												6
-	(United States) Johnny Fedricks	DNQ	DNQ		13	DNQ		18		16				25	0
-	(United States) Hugh Thomas						13								0
-	(United States) George Lynch	DNQ	DNQ		DNQ	DNQ						14	17	23	0
-	(United States) Eddie Johnson R			17	DNQ	14		DNQ		DNQ					0
-	(United States) Phil Shafer						14								0
-	(United States) Bob Finney R						15								0
-	(United States) Jimmy Daywalt R													15	0
-	(United States) Gene Hartley R	16	DNQ												0
-	(United States) Emil Andres	DNQ	16												0
-	(United States) Glenn Harrison						16								0
-	(United States) Art McKee						17								0
-	(United States) Johnnie Tolan R											DNQ	DNQ	17	0
-	(United States) Spider Webb	20	DNQ	DNP	18			DNQ	DNQ						0
-	(United States) Manuel Ayulo	DNQ						DNQ				DNQ	18	26	0
-	(United States) Lou Florence R										18		DNQ		0
-	(United States) Pete Woods R						18								0
-	(United States) Wayne Sankey						19								0
-	(United States) Jim Hammond						20								0
-	(United States) Phil Hill R						21								0
-	(United States) Walt Ader	22	DNQ	DNQ	DNQ			DNS							0
-	(United States) Russ Snowberger						22								0
-	(United States) Jackie Holmes	23	DNQ		DNQ										0
-	(Canada) Ray Shadbolt R						23								0
-	(United States) Dick Fraizer R	DNQ												24	0
-	(United States) Jim Rathmann	24													0
-	(United States) Keith Andrews R						24								0
-	(United States) Wayne England R						25								0
-	(United States) Buster Hammond R						26								0
-	(United States) Art Hillis						27								0
-	(United States) Jimmy Jackson	29													0
-	(United States) Buster Warke			DNQ				DNS		DNQ					0
-	(United States) William Cantrell	DNS													0
-	(United States) Johnny Mantz	DNS													0
-	(United States) Milt Fankhauser	DNQ			DNQ	DNQ			DNQ						0
-	(United States) Carl Scarborough	DNP						DNQ	DNQ	DNQ					0
-	(United States) Kenny Eaton	DNQ			DNQ	DNQ									0
-	(United States) Don Padia						DNQ					DNQ	DNQ		0
-	(United States) Al Benoit										DNQ	DNQ	DNQ		0
-	(United States) Bill Taylor										DNQ	DNQ	DNQ		0
-	(United States) Chuck Leighton	DNQ	DNQ												0
-	(United States) Billy Devore	DNQ								DNQ					0
-	(United States) Frank Tillman					DNQ				DNQ					0
-	(United States) Bill Vukovich	DNQ									DNQ				0
-	(United States) Potsy Goacher	DNP				DNQ									0
-	(United States) Marvin Burke	DNQ													0
-	(United States) Hal Cole	DNQ													0
-	(United States) Ted Duncan	DNQ													0
-	(United States) George Fonder	DNQ													0
-	(United States) Carl Forberg	DNQ													0
-	(United States) Bob Gregg	DNQ													0
-	(United States) Norm Houser	DNQ													0
-	(United States) Danny Kladis	DNQ													0
-	(United States) Mark Light	DNQ													0
-	(United States) Cy Marshall	DNQ													0
-	(United States) Al Miller	DNQ													0
-	(United States) Chet Miller	DNQ													0
-	(United States) Jim Rigsby	DNQ													0
-	(United States) Bob Sweikert	DNQ													0
-	(United States) Charles Van Acker	DNQ													0
-	(United States) Mike Salay		DNQ												0
-	(United States) Mike Nazaruk			DNQ											0
-	(United States) Ottis Stine			DNQ											0
-	(United States) Ed Terry			DNQ											0
-	(United States) Bobby Barker				DNQ										0
-	(United States) Joe Sostilio					DNQ									0
-	(United States) Bill Johnson						DNQ								0
-	(United States) Milton Mabe						DNQ								0
-	(United States) Bob Harnar								DNQ						0
-	(United States) Art Hartsfeld									DNQ					0
-	(United States) Steve Truchan									DNQ					0
-	(United States) Hal Robson											DNQ			0
-	(United States) Frank Armi												DNQ		0
-	(United States) Cecil Burnaugh												DNQ		0
-	(United States) Lenny Lowe												DNQ		0
-	(United States) Mike Reilly												DNQ		0
-	(United States) Billy Ryan												DNQ		0
-	(United States) Hank Rogers													DNQ	0
-	(United States) Joe Adas	DNP													0
-	(United States) Mike Burch	DNP													0
-	(United States) Billy Earl	DNP													0
-	(Italy) Giuseppe Farina	DNP													0
-	(Italy) Franco Rol	DNP													0
-	(United States) Bud Rose	DNP													0
-	(Italy) Piero Taruffi	DNP													0
-	(United States) Ben Zukor	DNP													0
Pos	Driver	INDY (United States)	MIL1 (United States)	LHS (United States)	SPR1 (United States)	MIL2 (United States)	PIK (United States)	SYR (United States)	MSF (United States)	SPR2 (United States)	CSF (United States)	ASF (United States)	BME (United States)	DAR (United States)	Pts

Color	Result
Gold	Winner
Silver	2nd place
Bronze	3rd place
Green	4th & 5th place
Light Blue	6th-10th place
Dark Blue	Finished (Outside Top 10)
Purple	Did not finish (Ret)
Red	Did not qualify (DNQ)
Brown	Withdrawn (Wth)
Black	Disqualified (DSQ)
White	Did not start (DNS)
Blank	Did not participate (DNP)
Blank	Not competing

**In-line notation**
**Bold**	Pole position
Italics	Ran fastest race lap
*	Led most race laps
RY Rookie of the Year
R Rookie

== See also ==
- 1950 Indianapolis 500
