= Al Unser (disambiguation) =

Al Unser (1939–2021) was an American racecar driver.

Al Unser may also refer to:

- Al Unser Jr. (born 1962), his son, also an American racecar driver
- Al Richard Unser (born 1982), his grandson, also an American racecar driver
- Al Unser (baseball) (1912–1995), American baseball player

== See also ==
- Unser (disambiguation)
- Al (disambiguation)
