= Wally Mitchell =

Australian rules footballer, born 1912

Personal information
- Full name: William Alfred Mitchell
- Born: 22 April 1912; Carlton North, Victoria
- Died: 31 October 1982 (aged 70); Heidelberg, Victoria
- Height: 182 cm (6 ft 0 in)
- Weight: 82 kg (181 lb)

Playing career^{1}
Years	Club	Games (Goals)
1933	Fitzroy	2 (0)
- ^{1} Playing statistics correct to the end of 1933.

William Alfred "Wally" Mitchell (22 April 1912 – 31 October 1982) was an Australian rules footballer who played with Fitzroy in the Victorian Football League (VFL).
