= Bainbridge Township, Ohio =

Township in Ohio, US

Bainbridge Township
- Civil township
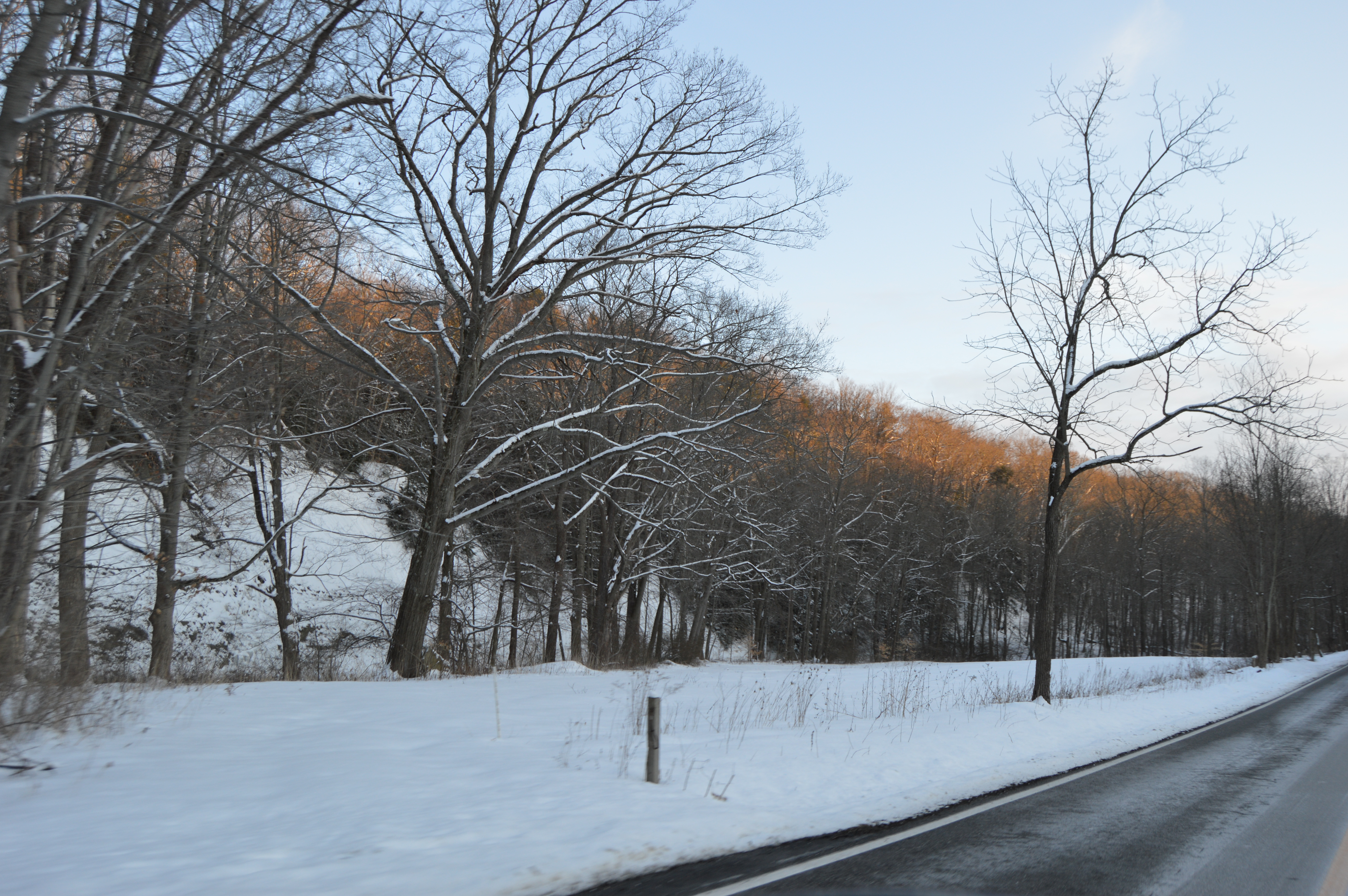
- Scene along Geauga Lake Road

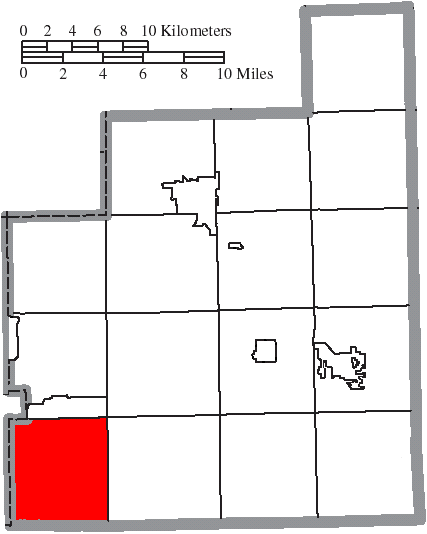
- Location of Bainbridge Township in Geauga County
- Coordinates: 41°23′13″N 81°20′46″W
- Country: United States
- State: Ohio
- County: Geauga

Area
  - Total: 25.9 sq mi (67.0 km^{2})
  - Land: 25.6 sq mi (66.3 km^{2})
  - Water: 0.31 sq mi (0.8 km^{2})
- Elevation: 1,125 ft (343 m)

Population (2020)
  - Total: 12,893
  - Density: 504/sq mi (194/km^{2})
- Time zone: UTC-5 (Eastern (EST))
  - Summer (DST): UTC-4 (EDT)
- ZIP code: 44023
- Area code: 440
- FIPS code: 39-03590
- GNIS feature ID: 1086148
- Website: www.bainbridgetwp.com

Bainbridge Township is one of the sixteen townships of Geauga County, Ohio, United States and is a suburb of Cleveland. As of the 2020 census the population was 12,893.

== Geography ==
Located in the southwestern corner of the county, it borders the following townships and cities:

- Russell Township – north
- South Russell – northwest
- Newbury Township – northeast corner
- Auburn Township – east
- Mantua Township, Portage County – southeast corner
- Aurora – south
- Reminderville – southwest corner
- Solon – west
- Chagrin Falls – northwest, south of Bentleyville
- Bentleyville – northwest, north of Chagrin Falls

The township covers a total area of 25 sq mi (65 km^{2}).

No municipalities are located in Bainbridge Township, although the census-designated place of Bainbridge is located in the center of the township.

== Name and history ==
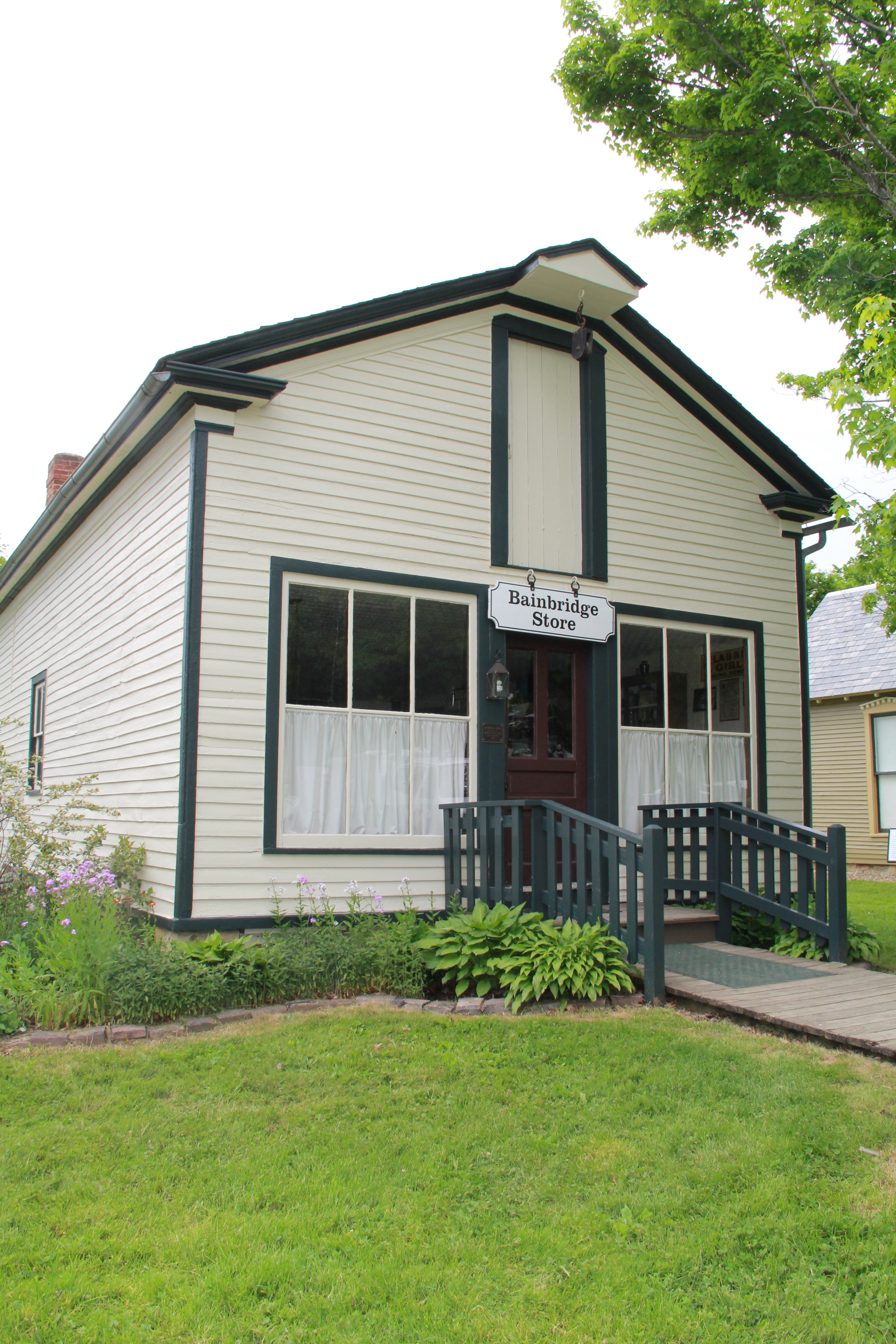
Bainbridge IGA store, formerly at corner of Rt. 306 and Chagrin Road

Named for Commodore William Bainbridge, it is the only Bainbridge Township statewide. The village of Bainbridge, Ohio, is located in Ross County, in Southern Ohio.

The first residents of Bainbridge were the McConougheys, who came from Blandford, Massachusetts. Many other settlers followed. In 1817, Bainbridge Township was established. The first housing subdivision, Lake Lucerne, opened in 1922. It is still one of the largest in Bainbridge.

The Geauga County Public Library opened a branch in Bainbridge in 1965. Initially located in a small storefront, the Bainbridge Library was expanded considerably upon moving to a new building.

== Government ==
The township is governed by a three-member board of trustees, who are elected in November of odd-numbered years to a four-year term beginning on the following January 1. Two are elected in the year after the presidential election and one is elected in the year before it. There is also an elected township fiscal officer, who serves a four-year term beginning on April 1 of the year after the election, which is held in November of the year before the presidential election. Vacancies in the fiscal officership or on the board of trustees are filled by the remaining trustees.

== Community fundraising ==
Community members have raised funds to support a variety of community activities over the years. Among them are two annual events managed by The Bainbridge Men's Civic Club: The Taste of Bainbridge and the Ox Roast. The Taste of Bainbridge began in 1997; the first Ox Roast took place in 2012. For the Taste of Bainbridge, participating local restaurants prepare and serve menu items that are served to diners who donate an entry fee. The Ox Roast features more activities and fewer food vendors. All proceeds from both events go to community programs such as scholarships for students and the nonprofit Bainbridge Area Food for Friends. The Ox Roast is held at Centerville Mills Park, a former YMCA camp now owned by the township.
