= Pikes Peak International Hill Climb =

Motorsport hillclimb race in Pikes Peak, United States

- Location: Colorado Springs, Colorado, U.S. 38.84°N 105.04°W
- First race: 1916
- Distance: 12.42 mi (20 km)

Circuit information
- Surface: Asphalt (historically, dirt)
- Turns: 156
- Lap record: 7:57.148 (Romain Dumas, Volkswagen I.D. R Pikes Peak, 2018, Unlimited)

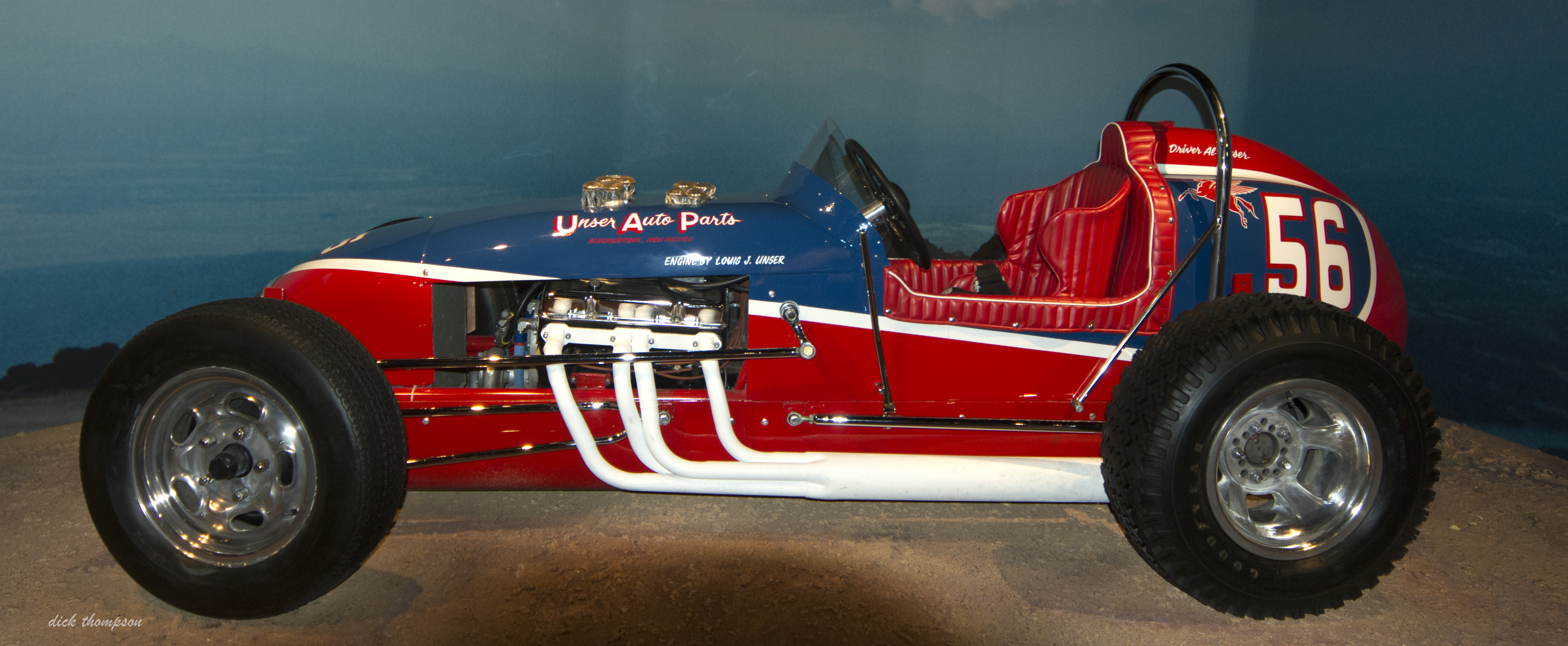
Al Unser's 1961 car

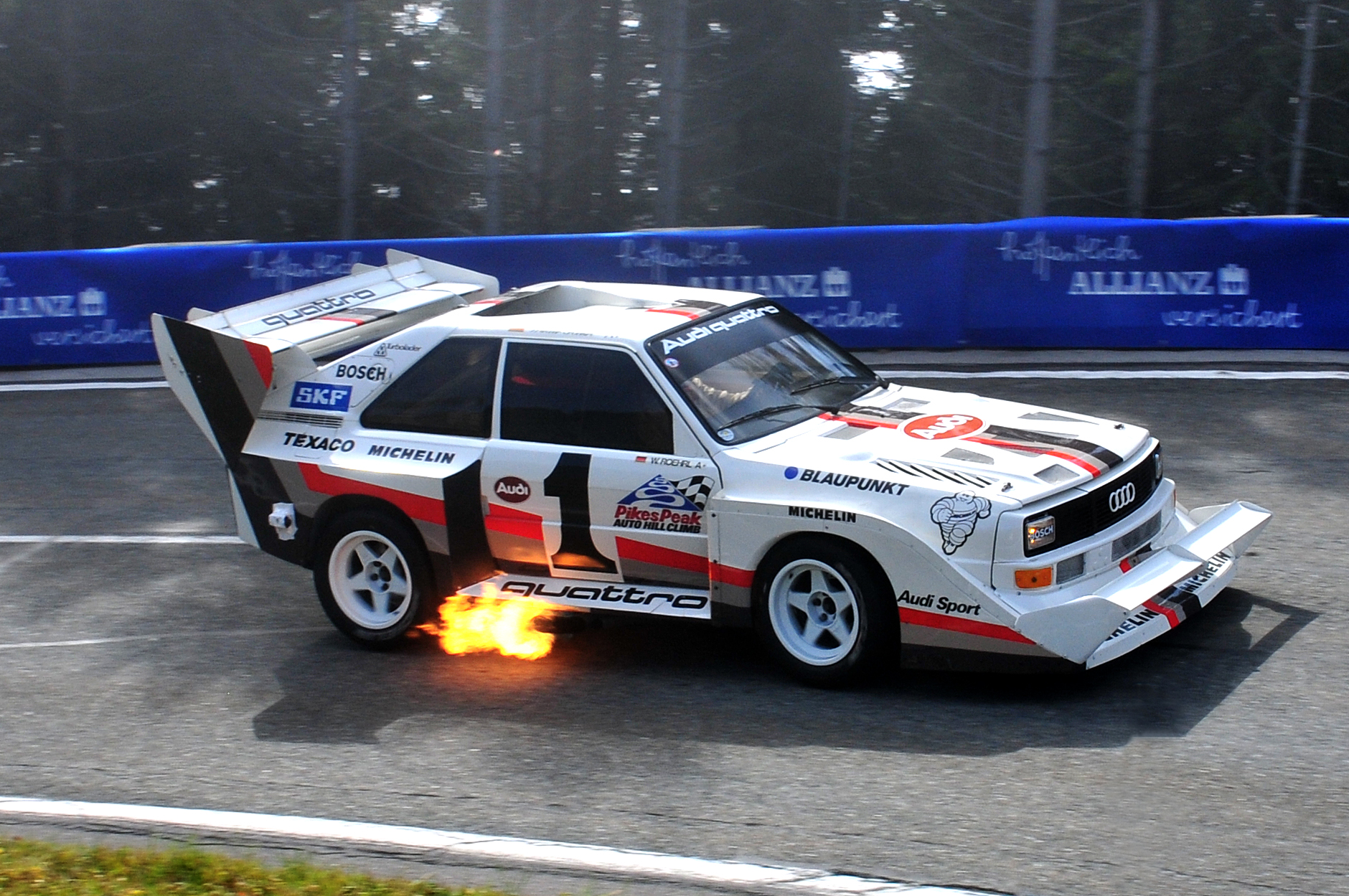
1987 Audi Sport quattro E2 'Pikes Peak'

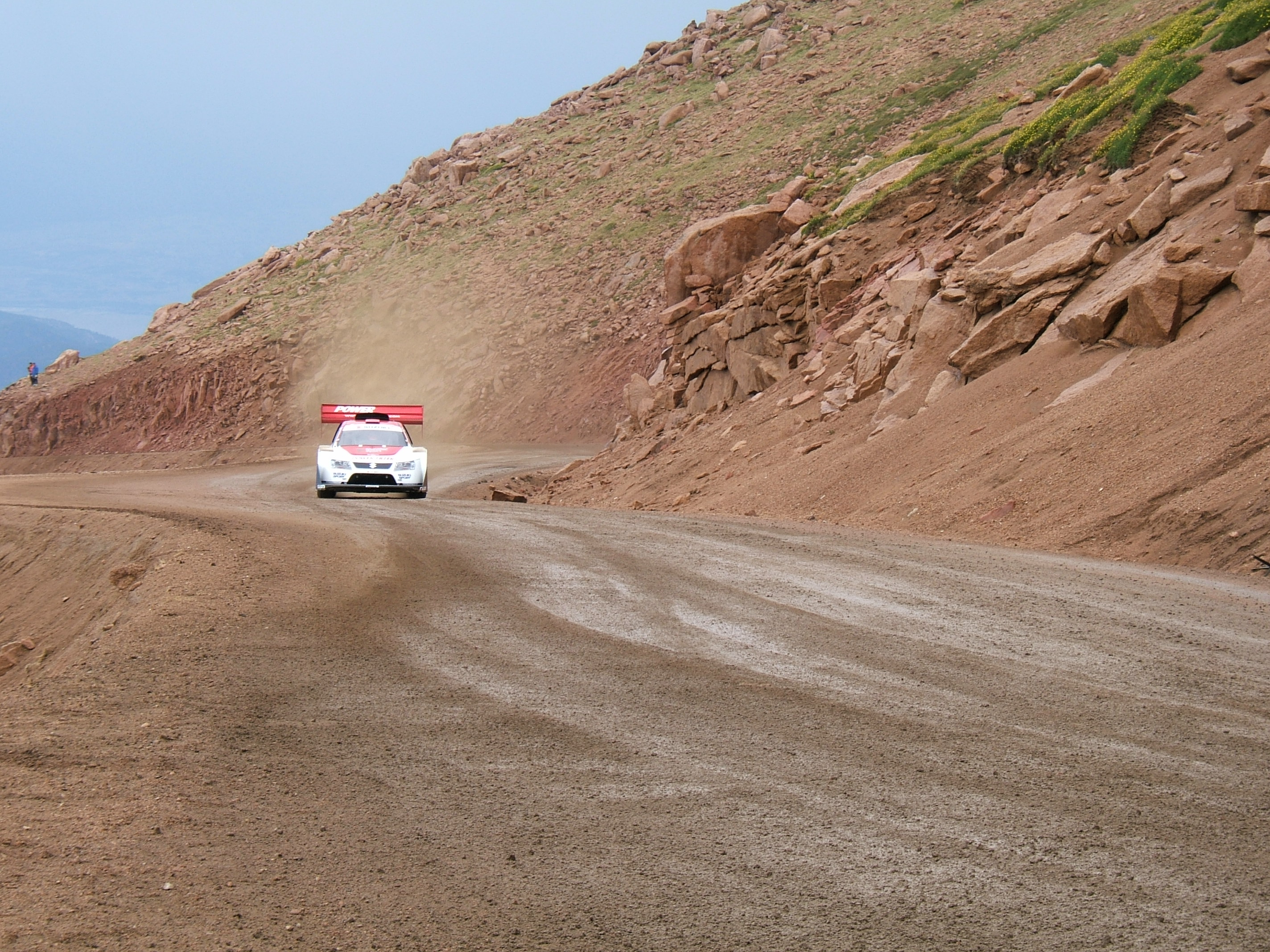
Suzuki Escudo at the 2006 Race to the Clouds

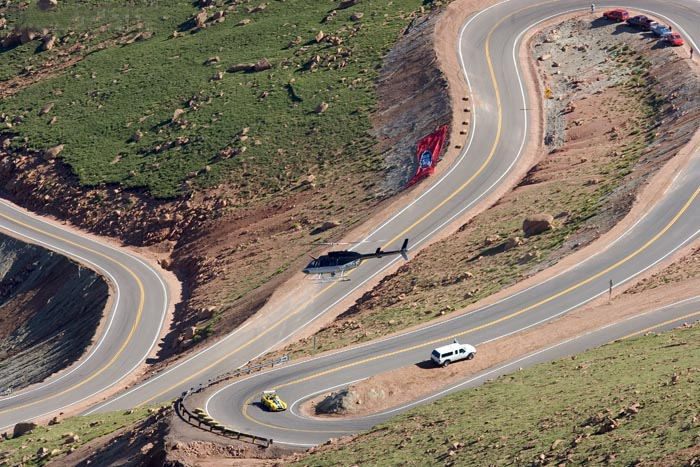
Randy Schranz rising above treeline at the 85th Race to the Clouds, 2007

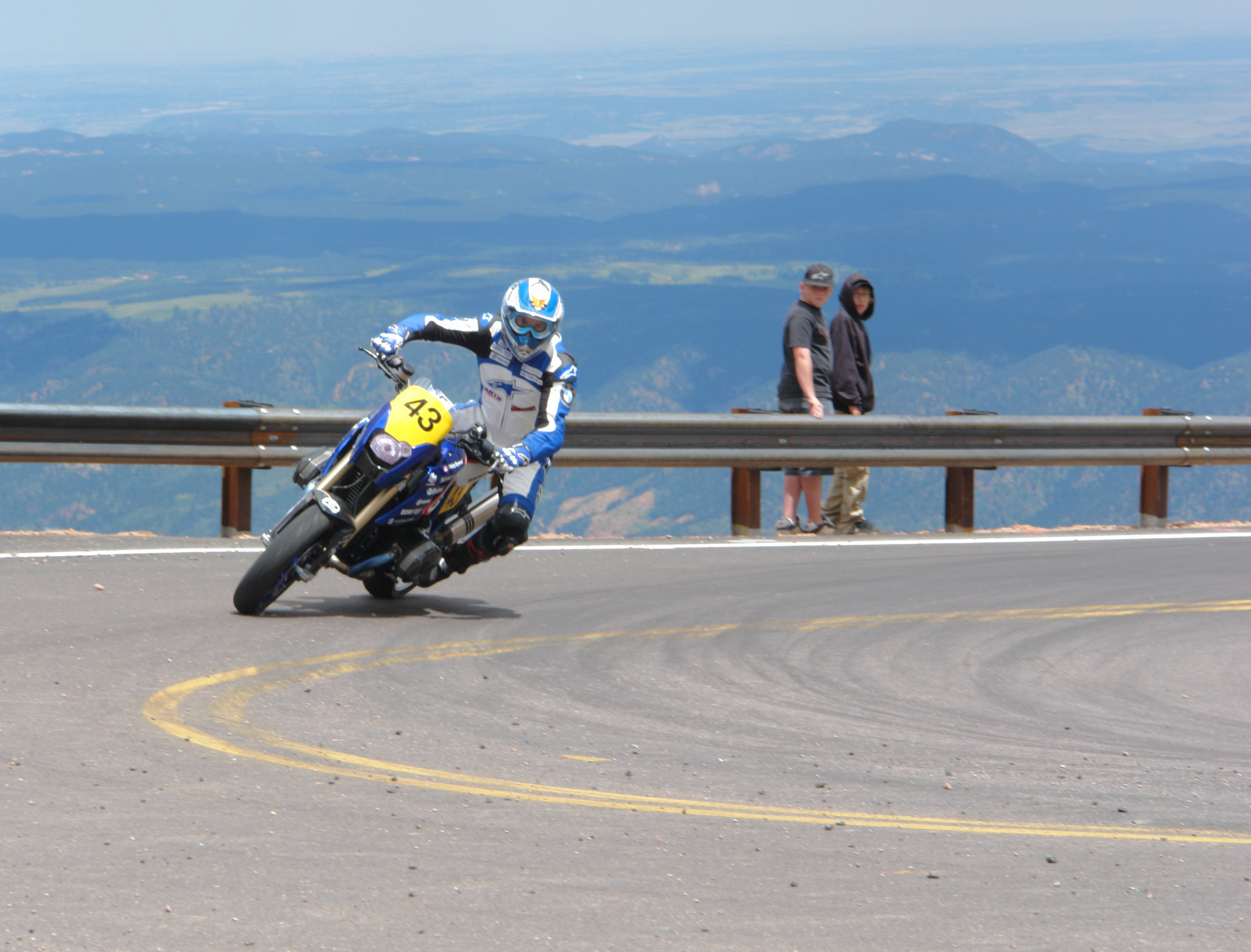
Micky Dymond on his way to winning the 2007, 1200cc class, riding a BMW HP2

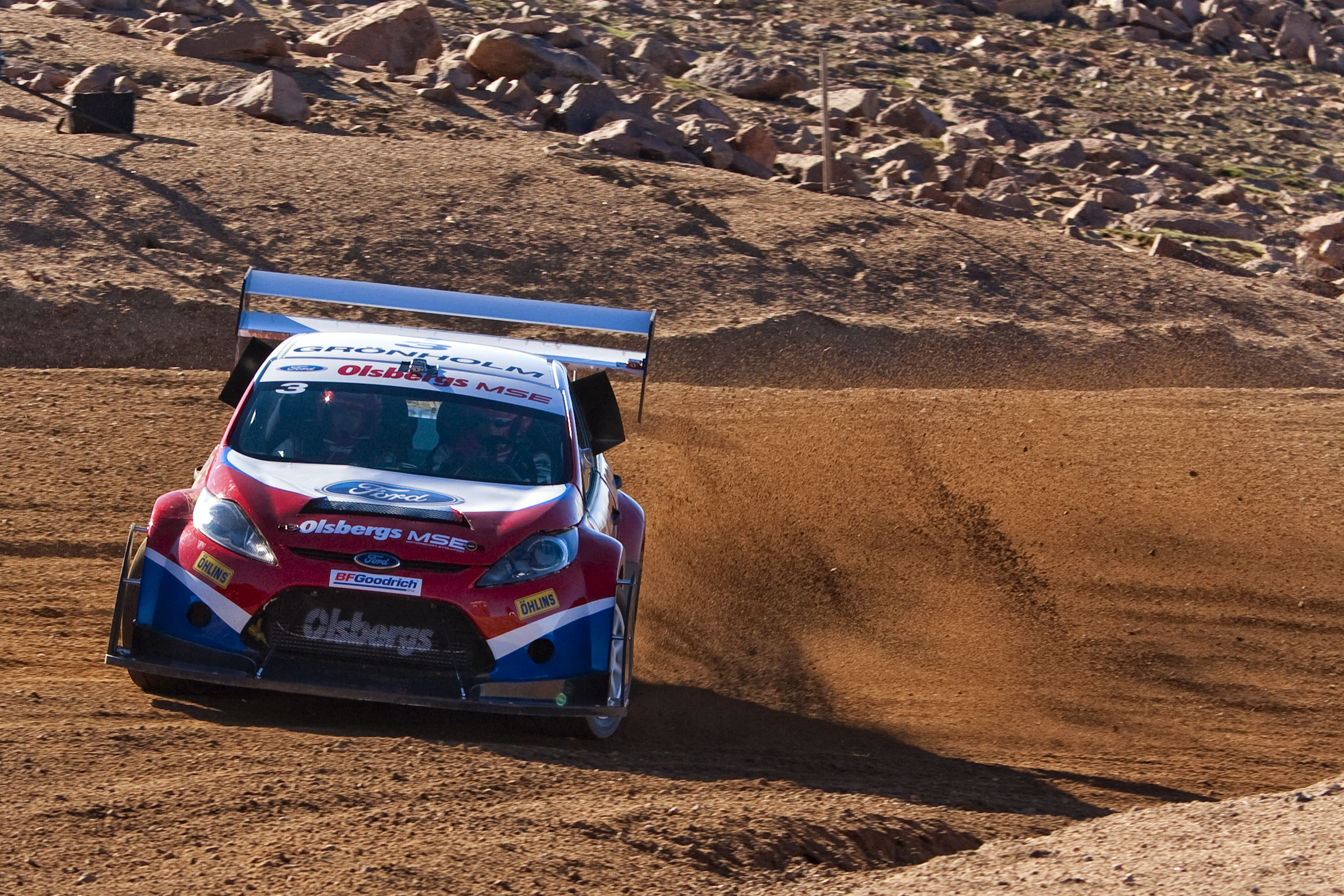
Marcus Grönholm drove an 800 BHP Ford Fiesta to 5th overall at the 2009 event

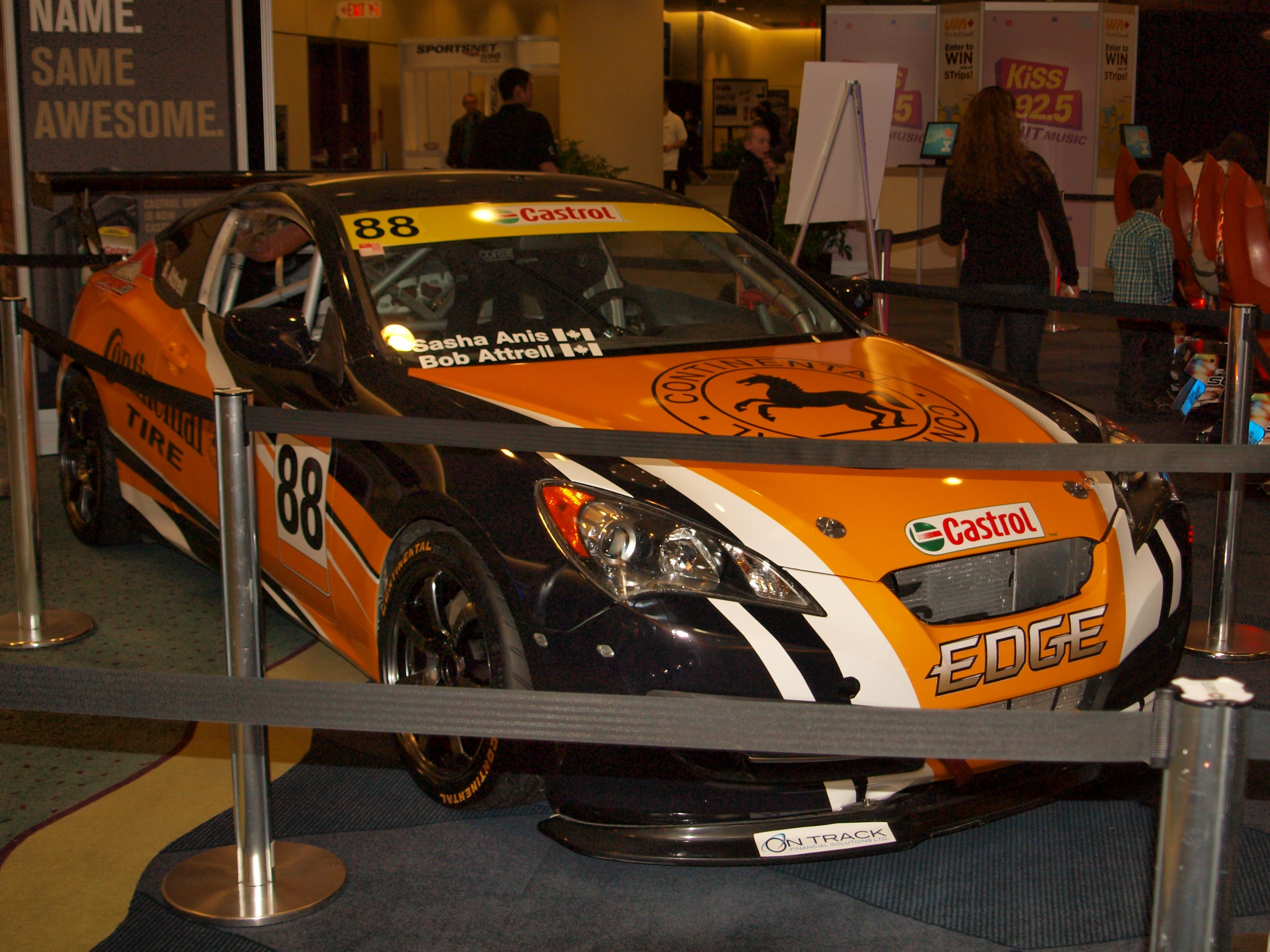
Rhys Millen's 2011 Pikes Peak Hyundai Genesis coupé

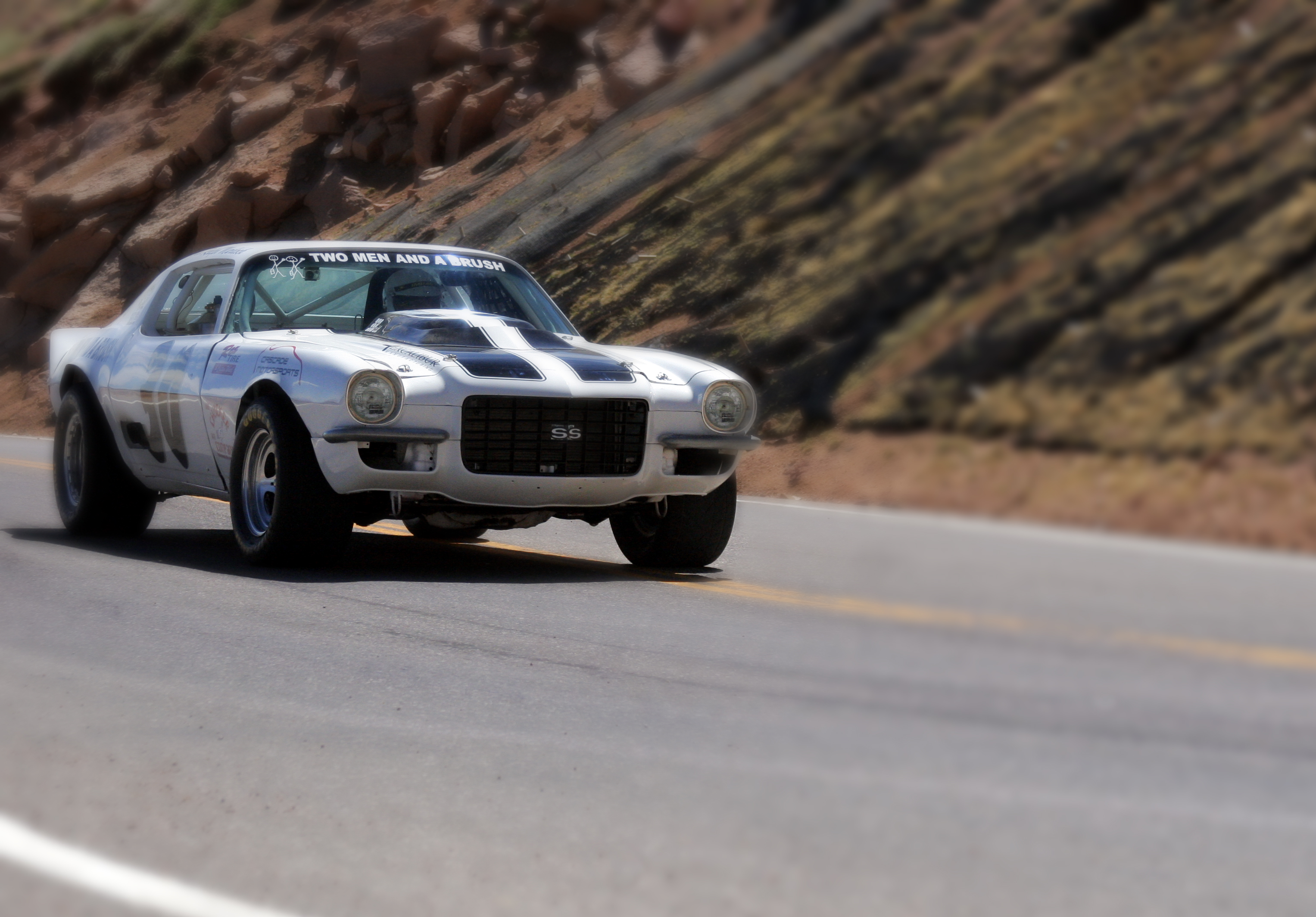
Ralph Murdock breaking the vintage class modified (RMVR modified) record in 2011, with a time of 12:51.004 in a 1970 Chevrolet Camaro

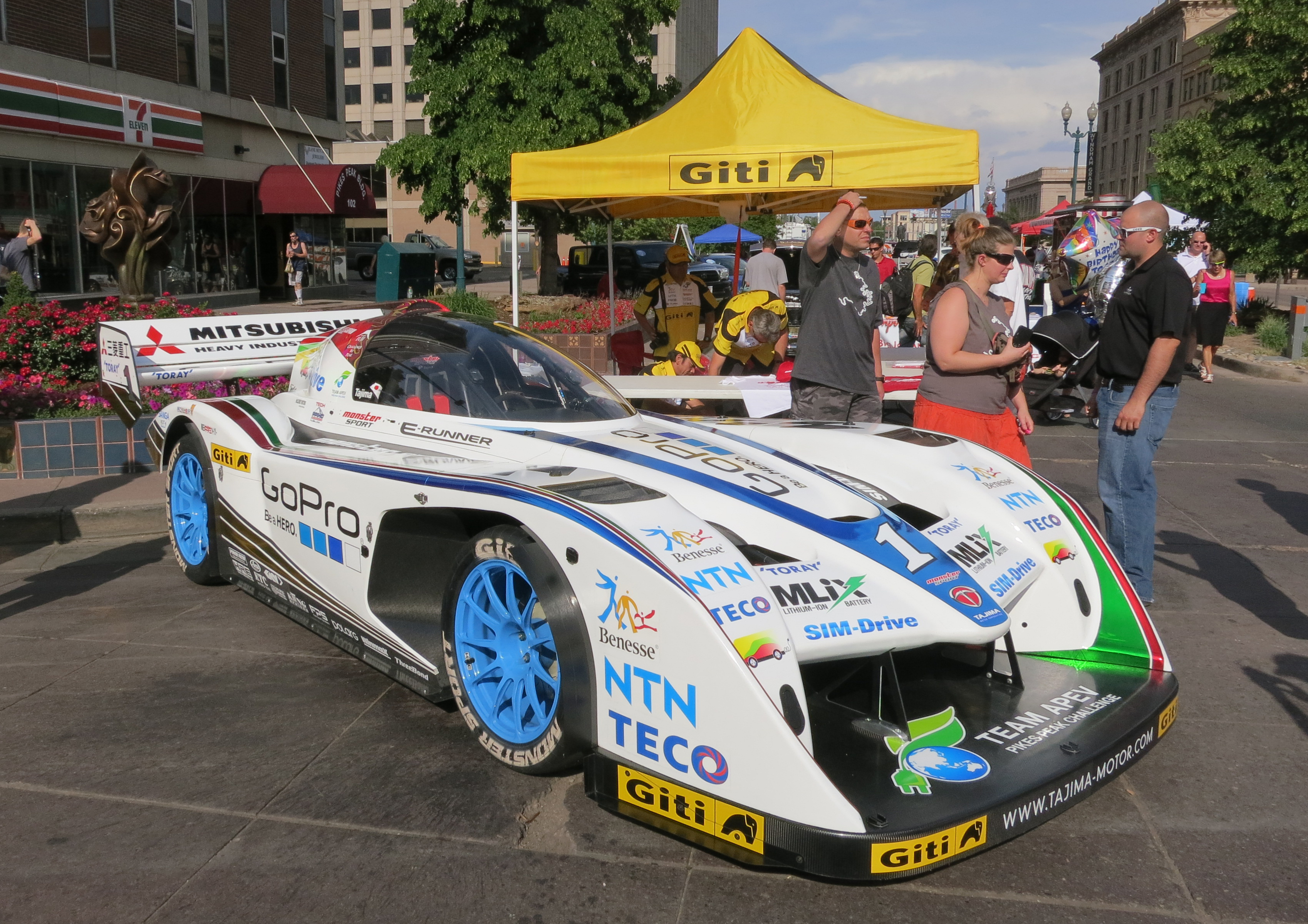
Monster Tajima Electric Car displayed during 2013 PPIHC Fan Fest at Colorado Springs, U.S.

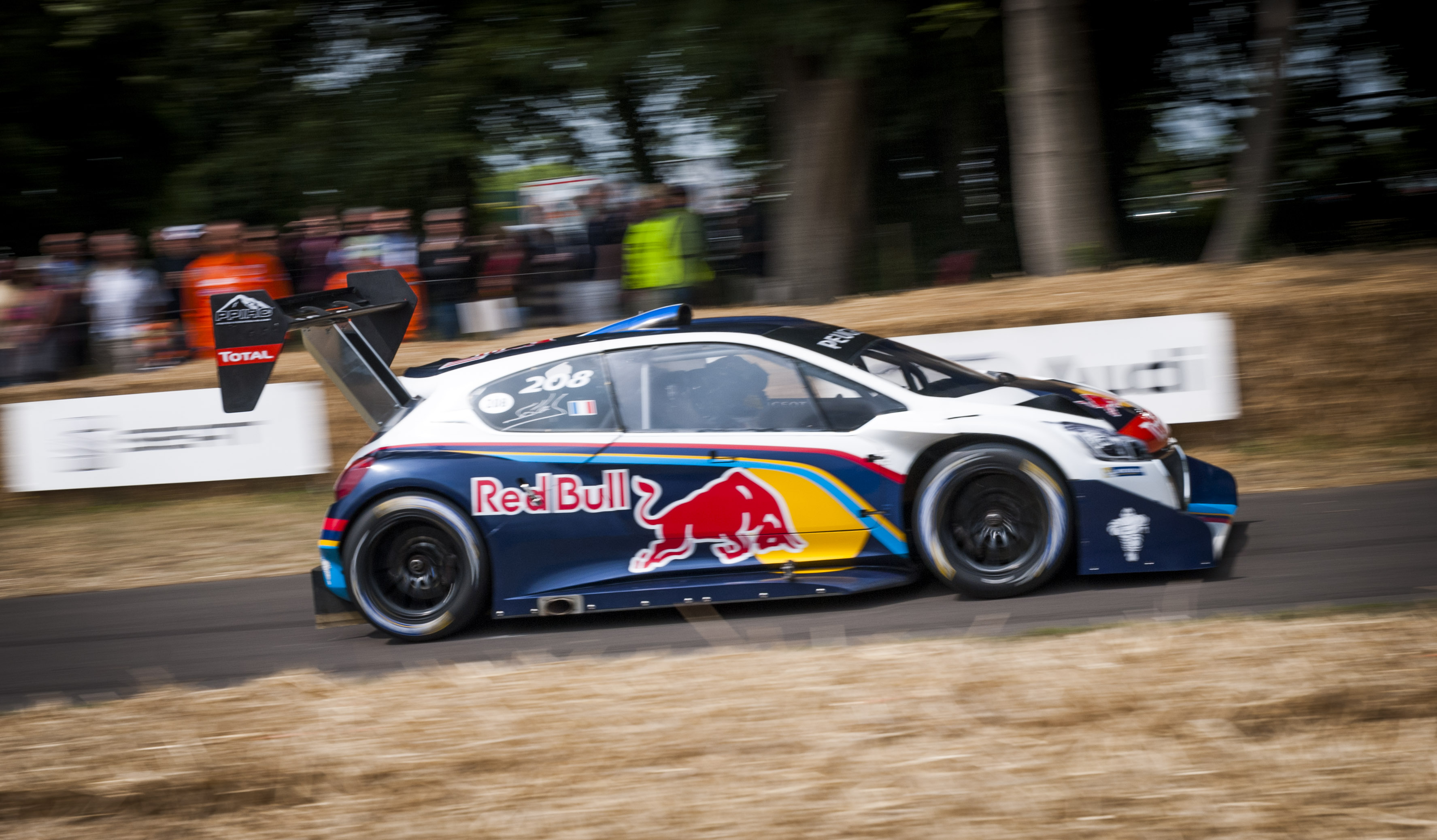
Sébastien Loeb shattered the course record in 2013 with a Peugeot 208 T16 Pikes Peak (875 bhp and 875 kg)

The Pikes Peak International Hill Climb (PPIHC), also known as The Race to the Clouds, is an annual automobile hillclimb to the summit of Pikes Peak in the U.S. state of Colorado. The track measures 12.42 miles (19.99 km) and has over 156 turns, climbing 4,720 ft (1,440 m) from the start at mile 7 on Pikes Peak Highway, to the finish at 14,115 ft (4,302 m), on grades averaging 7.2%. It previously consisted of both gravel and paved sections, but as of August 2011, the highway is fully paved; as a result, all subsequent events will be run on asphalt from start to finish.

The self-sanctioned race has taken place since 1916, and provides a variety of vehicle classes. The PPIHC operates as the Pikes Peak Auto Hill Climb Educational Museum to organize the annual motorsports event.

== History ==
=== Early history ===
The first Pikes Peak Hill Climb was promoted by Spencer Penrose, who had converted the narrow carriage road into the much wider Pikes Peak Highway.

The first Penrose Trophy was awarded in 1916 to Rea Lentz with a time of 20:55.60. In the same year Floyd Clymer won the motorcycle class with a time of 21:58.41. In 1924 the final Penrose Trophy was awarded to Otto Loesche in his Lexington Special. In the years following, Glen Schultz and Louis Unser shared a rivalry and won the event 12 times between them. In 1929 the popular stock car class was added to the event.

Following World War II, Louis Unser returned to his winning ways at Pikes Peak, winning three more times between 1946 and 1970; these wins were tightly contended with rival Al Rogers. During this time the event was part of the AAA and USAC IndyCar championship. In 1953, the Sports Car Club of America (SCCA) sponsored the event, bringing with it an influx of sports cars. In this period the course record was broken every year from 1953 until 1962, this is the largest string of record breaking runs in the event's history. The majority of these records were set by Louis's nephew, Bobby Unser. In 1954 motorcycles returned to the event, the first time since its inception in 1916. The motorcycle overall victory that year went to Bill Meier riding a Harley-Davidson motorcycle.

In 1971 the event was won by the first non-gasoline vehicle (propane), this was also the first overall victory from the stock car class (1970 Ford Mustang), the car was driven by the Danish-American Ak Miller.

=== European involvement ===
In 1984 the first European racers took part in the PPIHC with Norwegian Rallycrosser Martin Schanche (Ford Escort Mk3 4x4) and French Rally driver Michèle Mouton (Audi Sport quattro), thereby starting a new era for European teams in the almost unknown American hillclimb. While Schanche failed to set a new track record due to a flat right front tire, Mouton (together with her World Rally Championship co-driver Fabrizia Pons from Italy) won the Open Rally category but failed to win the event overall. Mouton achieved the overall victory and course record of 11:25.39 in the following year.

In 1987, Walter Röhrl (D), won the overall race and set a new record of 10:47,85 (Open Rally category), in the Audi Sport quattro S1 „Pikes Peak".

In 1989, an award-winning short film about the 1988 event was released by French director Jean-Louis Mourey. The film, titled Climb Dance, captured the efforts of Finnish former World Rally Champion Ari Vatanen, as he won the event in a record-breaking time of 10 minutes and 47 seconds, with his turbocharged Peugeot 405 Turbo 16.

=== Paving of the highway ===
The City of Colorado Springs began to pave the highway in 2002 after losing a lawsuit against the Sierra Club, which sued on account of erosion damage to streams, reservoirs, vegetation and wetlands downstream from the 1.5 million tons of road gravel deposited over several decades. The local authority paved approximately 10% of the route each year after the order. The 2011 event was the last race with dirt sections, comprising approximately 25% of the course.

During this evolutionary period of the event, the Japanese driver Nobuhiro Tajima with Suzuki cars scored 6 overall victories (2006–2011) and two course records. His 2011 record was the first to break the 10-minute barrier.

Hill Climb champion Rod Millen warned at the time that paving the road would put an end to the race. However, the 2012 race saw over 170 racer registrations by December 2011, compared with 46 at the same time the previous year.

The 90th running of the event happened in 2012 and saw a larger field and a longer race day than ever before. This was the first time the race has been run on all asphalt leading to the breaking of several records, notably the overall record, which fell numerous times during the event finally falling to Rhys Millen, the son of previous event winner Rod Millen, in the Time Attack Division. During the event Mike Ryan spun his big rig in a hairpin in a section called the "W"s, hitting the guard rail, he then managed to execute a three-point turn and continued on course, at which point he broke his old record by 5 seconds. This highlighted the change that a fully paved course made to the speed of the event. The 2012 event also saw the first motorcycle to achieve a sub 10-minute time with the late Carlin Dunne in the 1205 Division riding a Ducati with a time of 9:52.819 which was only 1.5 seconds slower than the previous year's overall record.

2013 saw the nine-minute barrier shattered by WRC legend Sébastien Loeb (Peugeot 208 T16 Pikes Peak), with a time of 8:13.878, while Rhys Millen ended up second with 9:02.192, beating his own record by more than 44 seconds. Jean-Philippe Dayrault finished third with a time of 9:42.740, and Paul Dallenbach fourth with a time of 9:46.001, making it four drivers to beat the overall record set only the previous year.

=== Emergence of electric vehicles ===
Electric cars have featured on and off in the PPIHC since the early 1980s. In 1981 Joe Ball took a Sears Electric Car to the top in 32:07.410, in 1994 Katy Endicott brought her Honda to the top in 15:44.710 and in 2013 Nobuhiro Tajima broke the 10-minute barrier with a time of 9:46.530 in his E-RUNNER Pikes Peak Special. In the following years electric entries would become more common, steadily breaking their powertrain records and eventually the overall record in 2018.

Although the 2014 event was won by a gasoline powered car; second (Greg Tracy), third (Hiroshi Masuoka) and fourth (Nobuhiro Tajima) places overall were taken by electric cars. In 2015, electric cars placed first (Rhys Millen) and second (Nobuhiro Tajima) overall. In an interview with Rhys Millen, he said that he had lost power to the car's rear motor pack before the halfway point. Had this not happened he had expected his run to be 30 seconds faster. In 2016 gasoline again took top honors but electric completed the podium taking second (Rhys Millen) and third (Tetsuya Yamano) as well as fifth (Nobuhiro Tajima) places overall.

At the 2018 event, an electric car set a new overall record for the first time in the event's history as Frenchman Romain Dumas completed the course in the all-electric Volkswagen I.D. R with a time of 7:57.148, breaking the 8-minute barrier for the first time.

=== Motorcycle racing ===
Motorcycle racing at the Pikes Peak International Hill Climb has been a part of the race, since its inception in 1916. The very first winner in 1916 was Floyd Clymer (known for the Clymer repair manuals) riding a British Excelsior motorcycle.

During many of the early years however, motorcycle racing was not a staple at PPIHC. Motorcycles only competed in the years 1916, 1954–1955, 1971–1976 and again 1980–1982.

Motorcycle racing at Pikes Peak was a dangerous proposition, because all motorcycles were sent off in a mass-start. As a result visibility was poor, leading to racers having to "memorize the first 5 or 6 corners until enough dust had cleared to see the road" Both in 1976 and 1982 motorcycle racing was called off due to accidents at that year's race. In 1982 William Gross Jr. was killed when he was struck by another competitor, when trying to lift his own motorcycle after a fall.

It would only be in 1991 that motorcycles became an established part of the competition. During 1990 a timing system was developed that meant racers could be sent off in waves of five, vastly improving safety. Therefore Wally Dallenbach was appointed to organise the new motorcycle competition. Registrations were very slow however, and Wally withdrew from the event two months before its running. This led to hill climb chief Nick Sanborn approaching Bill Brokaw to organize the event. Brokaw and his friend Sonny Anderson went on to spearhead the organisation of the motorcycle races for 20 years until 2011.

During the following years motorcycle racing proved popular with many entrants across different classes. During the early 1990s flattrack motorcycles proved the fastest. Later in the decade and into the 2000s Quads (that also contested the motorcycle divisions) won the motorcycle competition.

Just like in the car divisions, the gradual paving of the road from 2002 to 2012 changed the face of the competition. Where previously motocross and flattrack motorcycles proved to be the winning formula, supermotards gained popularity during the 2000s. In 2004 Davey Durelle won on a Honda CRF450, ending a streak of wins by Quads. (There were later questions about the legality of Durelle's engine at the 2004 event)

By 2012 when the course was fully paved the motorcycle record was promptly broken by Carlin Dunne riding a Ducati Multistrada, which was the first time a motorcycle recorded a time below 10 minutes.

During the 2010s roadbiased sports motorcycles won the event, exploiting the now fully paved circuit.

Motorcycle racing at the Pikes Peak International Hill Climb came to an abrupt end in 2019. On 30 June, four-time Pikes Peak International Hill Climb winner Carlin Dunne was killed in a crash. Riding a prototype Ducati Streetfighter V4 he crashed less than a quarter of a mile from the finish line.

This accident caused the organisation to postpone all motorcycle racing at the event. This decision was reviewed following the 2021 running of the event, and motorcycle competition was subsequently discontinued alltogether.

The fastest ever time on a motorcycle was set by Rennie Scaysbrook riding an Aprilia Tuono V4 at 9:44.963 during the 2019 event.

== Racing divisions ==
The Pikes Peak International Hill Climb is known for its very diverse selection of machinery competing. Historically the race has been contested by a plethora of diverse and changing divisions of cars and motorcycles. These include open-wheelers, sports cars, rally cars and even heavy trucks.

Currently the race consists of six divisions:

=== Unlimited ===
Any vehicle is allowed in the Unlimited Division as long as it passes safety inspection and meets the PPIHC's general rules. The Unlimited Division features the most exotic vehicles, most of them built specifically for this race. These race cars have the best chance of setting a new overall race record. In 2018, Romain Dumas set a new record of 7 minutes 57.148 seconds in the all-electric Volkswagen I.D. R Pikes Peak, beating Sébastien Loeb's previous record by over 15 seconds.

=== Time Attack 1 ===
A division for production based two- and four-wheel drive vehicles. Only closed cockpit four-wheeled vehicles are allowed to participate.

=== Porsche Pikes Peak Trophy by Yokohama ===
Making its debut at the 2018 event was the first official one-make Porsche category, exclusive to the Porsche Cayman GT4 Clubsport in four variants — Clubsport, Clubsport Trophy Specification, Clubsport MR, and Clubsport 2017 IMSA GS.

=== Open Wheel ===
The traditional Pikes Peak single-seater race cars with designs ranging from Indy style sprinters to dune buggies. Open-wheel cars have competed in every event since the inaugural race in 1916.

=== Pikes Peak Open ===
Production based vehicles with unlimited permitted modifications.

=== Exhibition Class ===
In keeping with the mission statement of the event, specifically to "demonstrate advancements in the practical application of motor sports technology", the race encourages competitors with vehicles that do not meet the technical specifications of PPIHC sanctioned divisions to enter in the Exhibition Class. While there are no class records for this class because of its exhibition status, entries are eligible for recording an overall course record as well as an attempt at records achieved by former classes.

== Race records ==
Below follows all currently recognised records. Records set during the most recent running of the event are in bold type.

=== Overall record ===
Division	Year	Name	Vehicle	Time
Unlimited	2018	(France) Romain Dumas	2018 Volkswagen I.D. R **E**	7:57.148

E Electric

=== Current 4-wheel division records ===
Division	Year	Name	Vehicle	Time
Unlimited - Production Based	2026	(France) Romain Dumas	2025 Ford Super Mustang Mach-E **E**	8:18.202
Unlimited - Super Unlimited	2026	(United Kingdom) Robin Shute	2026 Sendycar V1	8:29.497
Time Attack 1	2023	(United States) David Donohue	2019 Porsche GT2 RS Clubsport	9:18.053
Open Wheel	2026	(United States) Dan Novembre	2013 Wolf GB08S TC Special	9:01.689
Pikes Peak Open	2023	(France) Romain Dumas	2023 Ford Supervan 4.2 **E**	8:47.682
Pikes Peak GT4 Trophy by Yokohama – Turbo	2026	(United States) Laura Hayes	2022 Toyota Supra GT4 EVO2	10:17.538
Pikes Peak GT4 Trophy by Yokohama – NA	2024	(Portugal) Nuno Caetano	2023 Porsche 718 GT4 RS Clubsport	10:23.034

E Electric

=== Eligible non-division records ===
==== Records from the appendix of the PPIHC Rule Book^{1} ====
Type	Year	Name	Vehicle	Time
ICE Production Vehicles^{2}
Production Car^{3}	2023	(New Zealand) Rhys Millen	2023 BMW M8	10:12.024
Production SUV / Crossover^{4}	2018	(New Zealand) Rhys Millen	2018 Bentley Bentayga W12	10:49.902
Electric Production Vehicles
Electric Production Car^{5}	2020	(United States) Blake Fuller	2018 Tesla Model 3	11:02.802
Electric Production SUV / Crossover	2024	(United States) Ron Zaras **R**	2025 Hyundai Ioniq 5 N	10:49.267
Electric Production Truck / Van	2024	(United States) Gardner Nichols	2024 Rivian R1T	10:53.883
Electric Modified Vehicles
Electric Modified Car	2023	(United States) Randy Pobst	2021 Tesla Model S Plaid	9:54.901
Electric Modified SUV / Crossover	2024	(Spain) Dani Sordo **R**	2025 Hyundai Ioniq 5 N	9:30.852
Electric Modified Truck / Van	2023	(France) Romain Dumas	2023 Ford Supervan 4.2	8:47.682
Electric Prototype / Purpose-Built^{6}	2018	(France) Romain Dumas	2018 Volkswagen I.D. R	7:57.148
Hybrid Production Vehicles
Hybrid Production Car	2026	(United States) J. R. Hildebrand	2026 Chevrolet Corvette ZR1X **H**	9:30.104
Hybrid Modified Vehicles
Hybrid Modified Car^{7}	2020	(United States) James Robinson	2019 Acura NSX **H**	10:01.913

R Rookie

- **^1** — Denotes a record attempt that must be declared in advance.
- **^2** — Excludes Hybrid-Electric Vehicles and Electric vehicles.
- **^3** — Formerly Time Attack 2 Production.
- **^4** — Formerly Production SUV.
- **^5** — Formerly Electric Production.
- **^6** — Formerly Electric Modified.
- **^7** — Formerly Hybrid Fuel Record.

==== Alternative fuel records ====
Fuel	Division/Class	Year	Name	Vehicle	Time
Diesel	Exhibition	2023	(France) Gregoire Blachon	2023 Radical SR3 Diesel	10:25.071
Natural Gas	Open Wheel	1993	(United States) Johnnie Rogers	Wells-Coyote	11:50.090
Propane	Exhibition/Pikes Peak Open	2012	(United States) Randy Schranz	2012 Shelby Cobra	11:11.218
Turbine	Open Rally	1981	(United States) Steve Bolan	Bolan-Allison	15:27.180

==== Drivetrain records ====
Drivetrain	Division/Class	Year	Name	Vehicle	Time
Front-Wheel Drive	Unlimited - Production Based	2026	(United Kingdom) Jim Morris	2014 Volkswagen Golf	10:33.104
Rear-Wheel Drive	Unlimited ‑ Super Unlimited	2026	(United Kingdom) Robin Shute	2026 Sendycar V1	8:29.497
All-Wheel Drive	Unlimited	2018	(France) Romain Dumas	2018 Volkswagen I.D. R **E**	7:57.148

E Electric R Rookie H Hybrid

== Winners ==
The overall honours have always fallen to vehicles in car divisions, however motorcycles have their own divisions, records and winners. Cars have entered the event every year since its inception in 1916 (with the exception of years during the world wars) whereas motorcycles have only entered in a limited number of years.

=== Overall winners ===
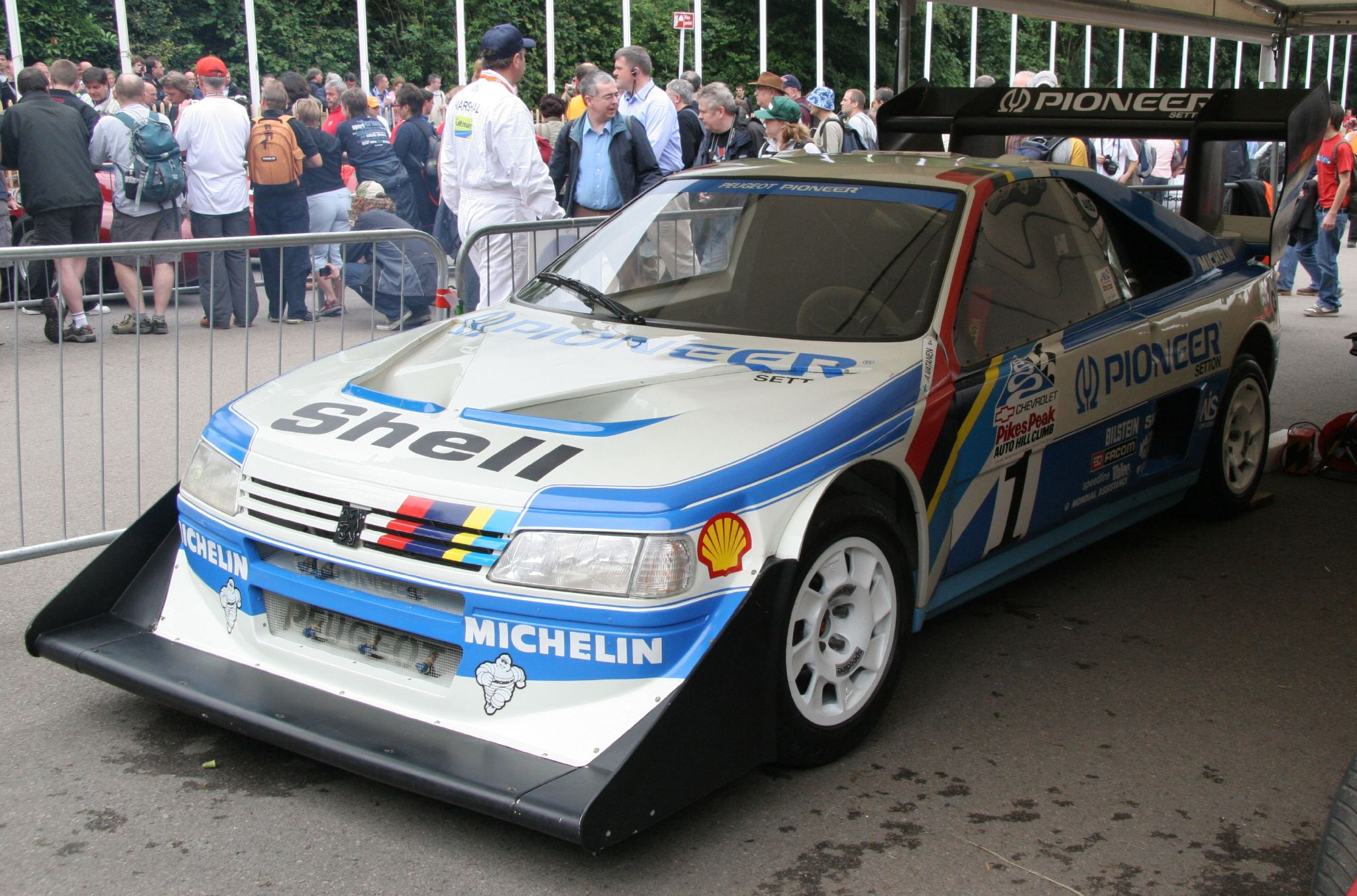
Ari Vatanen's 1988 Peugeot 405 T16

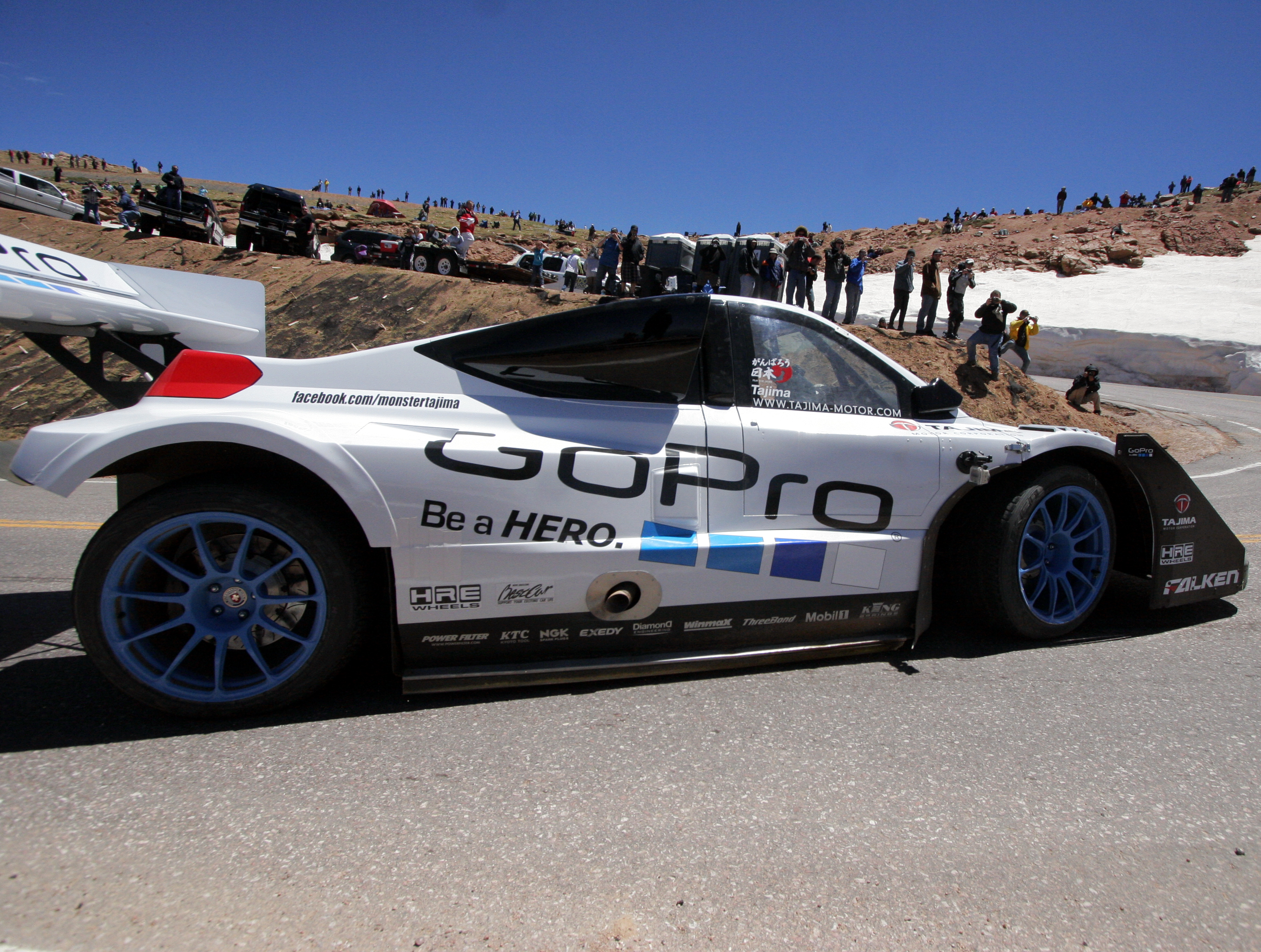
Nobuhiro Tajima's Suzuki SX4 during his 2011 record breaking run

Overall winners can compete under any division, although the majority come from the open wheel and more recently the unlimited division. A time in italics indicates this was a previous course record, a time in bold indicates the current course record.

Table of overall winners
Year	Winner	Vehicle	Time	Notes
1916	(United States) Rea Lentz	Oakland Romano Demon Special	20:55.600	
1917–1919	No competition due to World War I			
1920	(United States) Otto Loesche	Lexington Special	22:25.400	
1921	(United States) King Rhiley	Hudson Special	19:16.200	
1922	(United States) Noel Bullock	Ford Special	19:50.900	
1923	(United States) Glen Shultz	Hudson Essex	18:47.000	
1924	(United States) Otto Loesche	Lexington Special	18:15.000	
1925	(United States) Charles H. Myers	Chandler Special	17:48.400	
1926	(United States) Glen Shultz	Stutz	18:19.400	
1927	(United States) Glen Shultz	Stutz	18:25.100	
1928	(United States) Glen Shultz	Stutz Special	17:41.600	
1929	(United States) Edward Phillips	Shultz Stutz 8	18:22.800	
1930	(United States) Glen Shultz	Stutz DV-32	18:08.700	
1931	(United States) Charles H. Myers	Hunt Special	17:10.300	
1932	(United States) Glen Shultz	Shultz/Stutz Special	16:47.200	
1933	(United States) Glen Shultz	Stutz DV-32	17:27.500	
1934	(United States) Louis Unser	Stutz Special	16:01.800	
1935	(United States) W.P. Bentrup	1935 Chevrolet 1 1/2-ton Truck	26:12.000	(Note: In 1935 there was no official competition, however there was a recognised truck test.)
1936	(United States) Louis Unser	Shultz Stutz	16:28.100	
1937	(United States) Louis Unser	Stutz DV-32	16:27.300	
1938	(United States) Louis Unser	Loop Cafe Special	15:49.900	
1939	(United States) Louis Unser	Snowberger Special	15:39.400	
1940	(United States) Al Rogers	Joe Coniff Special	15:59.900	
1941	(United States) Louis Unser	Burd Special	15:35.200	
1942–1945	No competition due to World War II			
1946	(United States) Louis Unser	Maserati	15:28.700	(Note: In this year the event was run as a non-championship event of the American Automobile Association National Championship)
1947	(United States) Louis Unser	Maserati	16:34.770	(Note: In this year the event was run as part of the American Automobile Association National Championship)
1948	(United States) Al Rogers	Coniff Special Offenhauser	15:51.300	
1949	(United States) Al Rogers	Coniff Special	15:54.260	
1950	(United States) Al Rogers	Coniff Special	15:39.000	
1951	(United States) Al Rogers	Offenhauser	15:39.700	
1952	(United States) George Hammond	Kurtis Kraft Offenhauser Special	15:30.650	
1953	(United States) Louis Unser	Federal Engineering Special	15:15.400	
1954	(United States) Keith Andrews	Joe Hunt	14:39.700	
1955	(United States) Bob Finney	Dick Frenzel Special	14:27.200	
1956	(United States) Bobby Unser	Unser Special	14:27.000	(Note: In this year the event was run as a non-championship event of the United States Auto Club National Championship)
1957	(United States) Bob Finney	Dick Frenzel Special	14:11.700	
1958	(United States) Bobby Unser	Unser Special	13:47.900	
1959	(United States) Bobby Unser	Unser Special	13:36.500	
1960	(United States) Bobby Unser	Unser Special	13:28.500	
1961	(United States) Bobby Unser	Unser Special	12:56.700	
1962	(United States) Bobby Unser	Unser Special	12:05.800	
1963	(United States) Bobby Unser	Chevrolet 327	12:30.600	
1964	(United States) Al Unser	Offenhauser	12:24.500	
1965	(United States) Al Unser	Harrison Ford	12:54.300	(Note: In this year the event was run as part of the United States Auto Club National Championship)
1966	(United States) Bobby Unser	Chevrolet	12:23.800	
1967	(United States) Wes Vandervoort	Chevrolet	12:46.300	
1968	(United States) Bobby Unser	Rislone Special	11:54.900	
1969	(United States) Mario Andretti	Chevrolet STP Special	12:44.070	
1970	(United States) Ted Foltz	Chevrolet 303	12:41.100	
1971	(United States) Ak Miller	1970 Mustang	14:18.600	
1972	(United States) Roger Mears	Volkswagen 2180	13:26.840	
1973	(United States) Roger Mears	Volkswagen 2180	12:54.790	
1974	(United States) Errol Kobilan	Sprint Chevrolet 302	12:54.770	
1975	(United States) Orville Nance	Chevrolet 327	12:36.650	
1976	(United States) Rick Mears	Porsche 2386	12:11.890	
1977	(United States) Bob Herring	Chevrolet 350	12:15.720	
1978	(United States) Errol Kobilan	Chevrolet	11:55.830	
1979	(United States) Dick Dodge Jr.	Hoffpauir Wells Coyote Chevrolet	11:54.180	
1980	(United States) Ted Foltz	1970 Chevrolet 350	12:15.810	
1981	(United States) Gary Lee Kanawyer	1976 N-D Porsche	12:03.960	
1982	(United States) Bill Brister	Woziwodzki Wells Coyote Chevrolet	11:44.820	
1983	(United States) Al Unser Jr.	Woziwodzki Wells Coyote Chevy	11:38.300	
1984	(United States) Bill Brister	1981 Wells Coyote	11:44.490	
1985	(France) Michèle Mouton	Audi Sport Quattro S1	11:25.390	
1986	(United States) Bobby Unser	Audi Sport Quattro SL	11:09.220	
1987	(Germany) Walter Röhrl	Audi Sport Quattro E2 Pikes Peak	10:47.850	
1988	(Finland) Ari Vatanen	Peugeot 405 Turbo 16	10:47.220	
1989	(United States) Robby Unser	Peugeot 405 Turbo 16	10:48.340	
1990	(United States) Robby Unser	Unser Chevrolet	11:32.860	
1991	(United States) David Donner	Donner-Dykstra Chevrolet	11:12.420	
1992	(United States) Robby Unser	Unser Chevrolet	10:53.870	
1993	(United States) Paul Dallenbach	Davis Chevrolet	10:43.630	
1994	(New Zealand) Rod Millen	Toyota Celica AWD Turbo	10:04.060	
1995	(Japan) Nobuhiro Tajima	Suzuki Escudo	7:53.000	(Note: The event was run on a shortened course.)
1996	(New Zealand) Rod Millen	Toyota Celica	10:13.640	
1997	(New Zealand) Rod Millen	Toyota Celica	10:04.540	
1998	(New Zealand) Rod Millen	Toyota Tacoma	10:07.700	
1999	(New Zealand) Rod Millen	Toyota Tacoma	10:11.150	
2000	(United States) Larry Ragland	2000 GMC Envoy	11:17.660	
2001	(United States) Gary Lee Kanawyer	1981 Wells Coyote	10:39.760	
2002	(United States) David Donner	1997 Donner Dykstra	10:52.300	(Note: In 2002 it was decided that the road should be paved, completion was due before 2012. By the time of the 2002 event the first mile of the course was paved, a total of 6%.)
2003	(United States) Paul Dallenbach	2000 PVA-01	11:34.700	(Note: In 2003 the first mile of the course was paved, a total of 6%.)
2004	(United States) Robby Unser	Subaru Impreza STI	11:47.280	(Note: In 2004 the course was 21% paved. The paved section comprised the start line until Halfway Picnic Grounds.)
2005	(United States) David Donner	Donner/Dykstra Special	11:15.680	(Note: In 2005 the course was 21% paved. The paved section comprised the start line until Halfway Picnic Grounds.)
2006	(Japan) Nobuhiro Tajima	Suzuki Escudo	7:38.900	(Note: In 2006 the course was 35% paved. The paved section comprised the start line until Halfway Picnic Grounds and the section between Glen Cove and Double Cut.)
2007	(Japan) Nobuhiro Tajima	Suzuki XL7	10:01.408	(Note: In 2007 the course was 46% paved. The paved section comprised the start line until Halfway Picnic Grounds and the section between Glen Cove and Devil's Playground.)
2008	(Japan) Nobuhiro Tajima	Suzuki XL7	10:18.250	(Note: In 2008 the course was 46% paved. The paved section comprised the start line until Halfway Picnic Grounds and the section between Glen Cove and Devil's Playground.)
2009	(Japan) Nobuhiro Tajima	Suzuki SX4	10:15.368	(Note: In 2009 the course was 46% paved. The paved section comprised the start line until Halfway Picnic Grounds and the section between Glen Cove and Devil's Playground.)
2010	(Japan) Nobuhiro Tajima	Suzuki SX4	10:11.490	(Note: In 2010 the course was 57% paved. The paved section comprised the start line until Halfway Picnic Grounds, the section between Glen Cove and Devil's Playground, and the last mile.)
2011	(Japan) Nobuhiro Tajima	Suzuki SX4	9:51.278	(Note: In 2011 the course was 76% paved. The paved section comprised the start line until Halfway Picnic Grounds and the section between Glen Cove and the summit.)
2012	(New Zealand) Rhys Millen	Hyundai Genesis Coupe	9:46.164	(Note: From 2012 onwards the course was fully paved.)
2013	(France) Sébastien Loeb	Peugeot 208 T16 Pikes Peak	8:13.878	
2014	(France) Romain Dumas	Norma M20 RD-Honda	9:05.801	
2015	(New Zealand) Rhys Millen	eO PP03	9:07.222	(Note: Electric)
2016	(France) Romain Dumas	Norma M20 RD-Honda	8:51.445	
2017	(France) Romain Dumas	Norma M20 RD-Honda	9:05.672	
2018	(France) Romain Dumas	Volkswagen I.D. R	**7:57.148**	
2019	(United Kingdom) Robin Shute	2018 Wolf TSC-Honda	9:12.476	
2020	(United States) Clint Vahsholtz	2013 Ford Open	9:35.490	
2021	(United Kingdom) Robin Shute	2018 Wolf GB08 TSC-LT-Honda	5:55.246	
2022	(United Kingdom) Robin Shute	2018 Wolf TSC-FS-Honda	10:09.525	
2023	(United Kingdom) Robin Shute	2018 Wolf TSC‑FS-Honda	8:40.080	
2024	(France) Romain Dumas	2024 Ford F-150 Lightning SuperTruck	8:53.563	
2025	(Italy) Simone Faggioli	2018 Nova Proto NP01 Bardahl	3:37.196	
2026	(France) Romain Dumas	2025 Ford Super Mustang Mach‑E	8:18.202	

=== Motorcycle winners ===
Motorcycle winners can compete under any division, although the majority come from open or large displacement classes. A time in italics indicates this was a previous motorcycle record, a time in bold indicates the current motorcycle record.

Table of motorcycle winners
Year	Winner	Vehicle	Time	Notes
1916	(United States) Floyd Clymer	Excelsior	21:58.410	
1917–1953	No motorcycle competition was held.			
1954	(United States) Bill Meier	Harley-Davidson	15:34.100	
1955	(United States) Don Tindall	Harley-Davidson	16:08.600	
1956–1970	No motorcycle competition was held.			
1971	(United States) Gary Myers	Husqvarna	15:11.960	
1972	(United States) Steve Scott	Bultaco	15:13.470	
1973	(United States) Rick Deane	Triumph 750	13:56.030	
1974	(United States) Bob Conway	Yamaha 750	13:54.570	
1975	(United States) Rick Deane	Triumph 750	13:54.620	
1976	(United States) Rick Deane	Triumph 750	13:12.610	
1977–1979	No motorcycle competition was held.			
1980	(United States) Lonnie Houtchens	Yamaha 750	13:44.730	
1981	(United States) Brian Anderson	Triumph 750	13:20.860	
1982	(United States) Arlo Englund	Yamaha 490	13:19.280	
1983–1990	No motorcycle competition was held.			
1991	(United States) Brian Anderson	Wood-Rotax 600	13:24.820	
1992	(United States) Brian Anderson	Wood-Rotax	12:54.000	
1993	(United States) Clint Vahsholtz	Wood-Rotax	12:29.380	
1994	(United States) Clint Vahsholtz	Wood-Rotax 600	12:21.130	
1995	(United States) Clint Vahsholtz	1992 Wood-Rotax	9:17.100	
1996	(United States) Davey Durelle	1988 Wood-Rotax	12:33.730	
1997	(United States) Davey Durelle	1988 Wood-Rotax	12:21.960	
1998	(United States) John Stallworth	1987 Yamaha Banshee 430 (Quad)	12:52.370	
1999	(United States) Lonnie Eubanks	1996 Yamaha (Quad)	12:42.190	
2000	(United States) Bobby Parr	1999 LSR Lightweight (Quad)	12:37.860	
2001	(United States) Bobby Parr	2001 LSR Lightweight (Quad)	12:09.160	
2002	(United States) Bobby Parr	2002 Lone Star (Quad)	12:30.000	
2003	(United States) Bobby Parr	2002 Lightweight (Quad)	12:28.480	
2004	(United States) Davey Durelle	Honda CRF450	12:27.810	
2005	(United States) Micky Dymond	KTM	12:12.614	
2006	(United States) Gary Trachy	2006 Husqvarna SMR	11:46.841	
2007	(United States) Davey Durelle	2005 Rotax	11:41.756	
2008	(United States) Davey Durelle	2008 Aprilia SM 550	11:42.991	
2009	(United States) Davey Durelle	2009 Aprilia SXV	11:48.649	
2010	(United States) Gary Trachy	2009 TM Racing 660 SMX	11:33.700	
2011	(United States) Carlin Dunne	2011 Ducati Multistrada 1200	11:11.329	
2012	(United States) Carlin Dunne	2012 Ducati Multistrada 1200	9:52.819	
2013	(United States) Carlin Dunne	2013 Lightning Electric Superbike	10:00.694	
2014	(United States) Jeremy Toye	2013 Kawasaki Ninja ZX-10R	9:58.687	
2015	(United States) Jeffrey Tigert	2014 Honda CBR1000RR	10:02.735	
2016	(France) Bruno Langlois	2015 Kawasaki Z1000	10:13.106	
2017	(United States) Chris Fillmore	2017 KTM 1290 Super Duke R	9:49:625	
2018	(United States) Carlin Dunne	2018 Ducati MTS-1260 Pikes Peak	9:59.102	
2019	(Australia) Rennie Scaysbrook	2018 Aprilia Tuono V4 1100	**9:44.963**	

== See also ==
- Mont Ventoux Hill Climb, started in 1902
- Silverstone Race to the Sky (now the longest gravel hill climb in the world)
- Shelsley Walsh Speed Hill Climb (one of the oldest motorsport events in the world)
- Giants Despair Hillclimb and Rest and Be Thankful Speed Hill Climb, both started in 1906
- Mount Washington Hillclimb Auto Race (one of the oldest auto races in the United States)
