= Good Time Park =

Race track in Goshen, New York

Coordinates: 41°23′41″N 74°19′37″W

Good Time Park was a mile-long race track in Goshen, New York that hosted the Hambletonian harness race from 1930 to 1956.

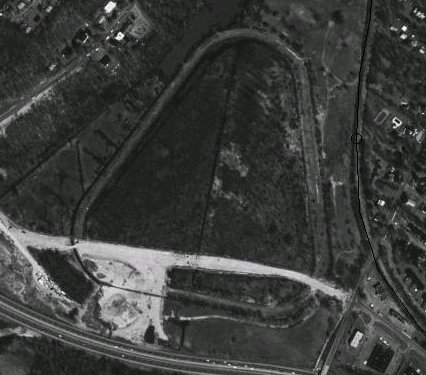
Aerial photo of remains of Good Time Park, with construction of the new exit 124 and NY 17M through the southern leg

== History ==
A largely unmaintained field for the first century of its existence, the area that would become Good Time Park was originally called Fiddler's Green. At the beginning of the 19th century, it was a common meeting place for local races, training, and breeding. Use died out around 1820, and it was largely forgotten until 1899, when it was refurbished to be used to train trotters. Sports promoter and horse owner William H. Cane bought the land in 1926, named the new track Good Time Park, and began to hold races there. By 1927, it had become a Grand Circuit track, with a large stables and a 2,224-seat grandstand.

The first Hambletonian in Goshen was held on August 27, 1930, and was broadcast on the radio by the Columbia Broadcasting System. The victory purse of $58,859.00 was won, after three heats, by Tom Berry driving Hanover's Bertha. The Hambletonian was held at Good Time Park for the next 26 years, with the exception of 1943, when wartime gas shortages caused it to be moved to Empire City Track in Yonkers. After Cane's death in 1956, conflicts over the administration of the sport caused the race to be moved out of New York State, to DuQuoin, Illinois. It was intended as a two-year stopgap measure, but the Hambletonian never returned to Goshen.

== Other uses ==
Auto races were occasionally held at the park. The Goshen 100 Champ Car race was run on June 20, 1936, won by Rex Mays for his first national series victory. He acquired $2,200 for the victory. Tony Bettenhausen won the 1946 version of the George Robson Memorial Classic on October 6. Mays, who won the last race held at the track in 1936, blew a rod during qualifying and was unable to participate. Bettenhausen repeated the feat on August 17, 1947, winning the second edition of the race.

== Decline ==
Good Time Park remained open after the Hambletonian moved away, hosting other, lesser horse races. In 1981, an attempt to bring back the Hambletonian failed; it went instead to The Meadowlands in East Rutherford, New Jersey, where the race is still run. The last races were held at Good Time in the 1970s, and the grandstand was finally taken down by the early 1980s.

== Today ==
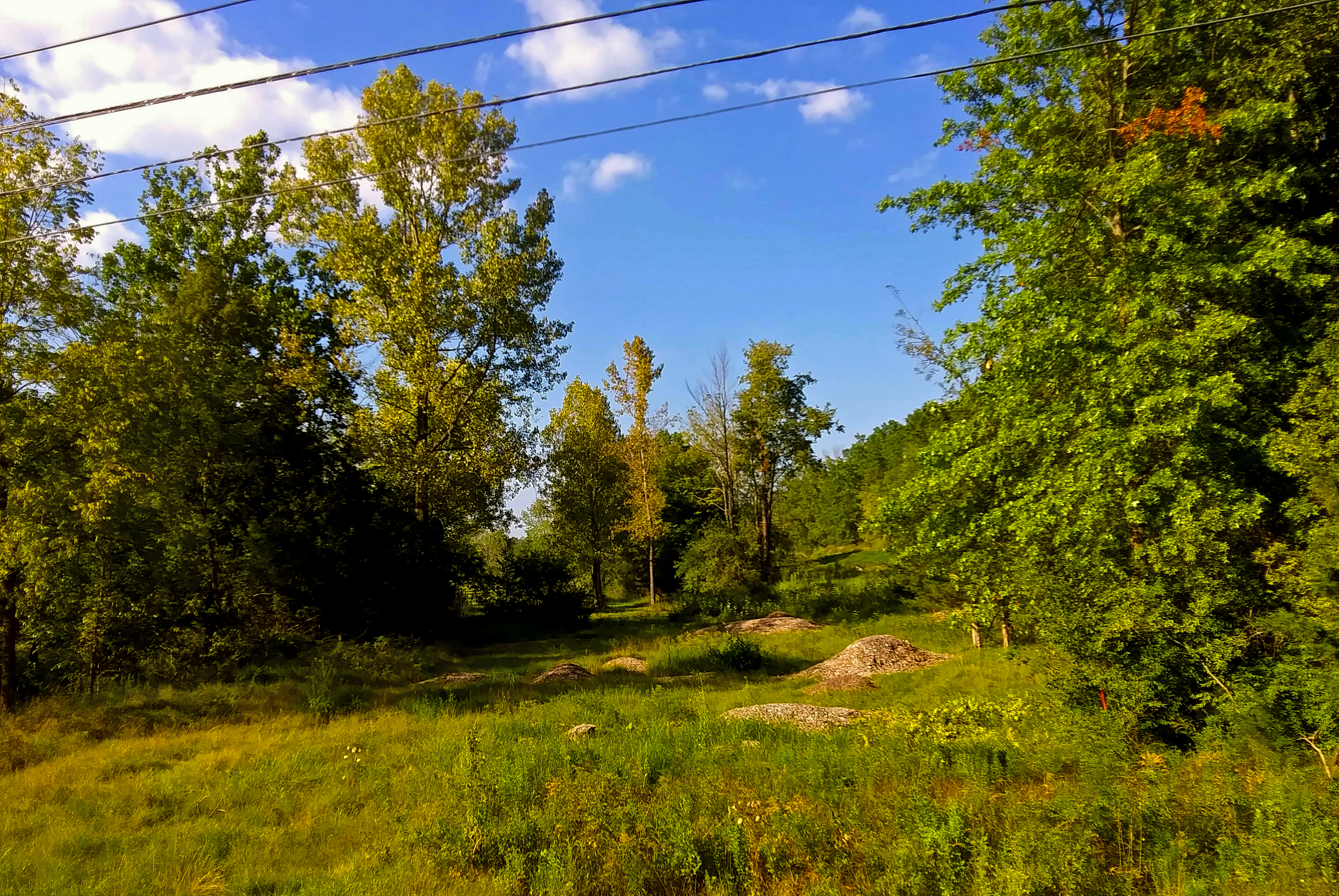
Former trackbed in 2023, seen from NY 17M near its southeast corner

Although it has gone back to woods and fields, Good Time Park's unusual triangular shape is still visible from the air, with New York State Route 17M now cutting through the southern part of the track. The footings of the grandstand can still be found as well as the rail on the inner circumference of the track. A single reviewing stand remains as well, visible from the nearby Orange Heritage Trailway.

Developers have coveted the area since at least the 1970s, when a massive development was proposed: 137 single-family houses, 308 multi-family units, 150 rental apartments and two strip malls. Some construction actually took place, but was abandoned. Land prices in Goshen and surrounding areas have soared in recent years, however, and in 2002, a new development of 116 single-family homes was proposed, despite community opposition. The idea was dropped, however, as much of the area now lies in a flood plain, making development impractical.
