= List of NASCAR fatalities =

14 NASCAR drivers have died at Daytona International Speedway, more than at any other circuit.

This article lists drivers who have been fatally injured while competing in or in preparation for (testing, practice, qualifying) races sanctioned by the NASCAR. A separate list compiles drivers who have died of a medical condition while driving or shortly thereafter and another section shows non-driver deaths.

There have been 129 deaths of drivers and spectators at NASCAR events. 109 of these deaths were drivers, while 20 were spectators. 14 drivers have also lost their lives at the Daytona International Speedway.

The NASCAR Cup Series has seen 28 driver fatalities, the most recent of which occurred on February 18, 2001, when Dale Earnhardt was killed on the last lap of the Daytona 500.

Safety in the sport has evolved through the decades. Technological advances in roll cages, window nets, seat mounts, air flaps, driving suits, and helmets as well as the HANS device, on-site medical facilities with helicopters, improved track emergency responders, and SAFER barriers have contributed to the prevention of further deaths.

== Driver fatalities ==
=== NASCAR Cup Series fatalities ===
Driver	Date of accident	Event	Circuit (Note: The name of the circuit at the time of the accident/incident is displayed.)	Session	Car
Larry Mann (USA)	September 14, 1952	250-mile race	Langhorne Speedway	Race	Hudson
Frank Arford (USA)	June 20, 1953	International 200	Langhorne Speedway	Qualifying	Oldsmobile
Lou Figaro (USA) (Note: Figaro died on October 25, 1954, the day after his accident.)	October 24, 1954	100-mile race	North Wilkesboro Speedway	Race	Hudson
John McVitty (USA)	April 21, 1956	150-mile race	Langhorne Speedway	Qualifying	Chevrolet
Clint McHugh (USA)	June 9, 1956	250-mile race	Memphis-Arkansas Speedway	Qualifying	Oldsmobile
Cotton Priddy (USA)	June 10, 1956	250-mile race	Memphis-Arkansas Speedway	Race	Chevrolet
Bobby Myers (USA)	September 2, 1957	Southern 500	Darlington International Raceway	Race	Oldsmobile
Joe Weatherly (USA)	January 19, 1964	Motor Trend 500	Riverside International Raceway	Race	Mercury
Fireball Roberts (USA) (Note: Roberts died on July 2, 1964, thirty-nine days after his accident.)	May 24, 1964	World 600	Charlotte Motor Speedway	Race	Ford
Jimmy Pardue (USA)	September 22, 1964	Goodyear tire test	Charlotte Motor Speedway	Testing	Plymouth
Billy Wade (USA)	January 5, 1965	Goodyear tire test	Daytona International Speedway	Testing	Mercury
Buren Skeen (USA) (Note: Skeen died on September 13, 1965, a week after his accident.)	September 6, 1965	Southern 500	Darlington International Raceway	Race	Ford
Harold Kite (USA)	October 17, 1965	National 400	Charlotte Motor Speedway	Race	Plymouth
Billy Foster (CAN)	January 20, 1967	Motor Trend 500	Riverside International Raceway	Practice	Dodge
Talmadge Prince (USA)	February 19, 1970	125-mile race	Daytona International Speedway	Qualifying Race (Note: The race also served as a points-paying championship round.)	Dodge
Friday Hassler (USA)	February 17, 1972	125-mile race	Daytona International Speedway	Qualifying Race	Chevrolet
Larry Smith (USA)	August 12, 1973	Talladega 500	Talladega Superspeedway	Race	Mercury
Tiny Lund (USA)	August 17, 1975	Talladega 500	Talladega Superspeedway	Race	Dodge
Ricky Knotts (USA)	February 14, 1980	125-mile race	Daytona International Speedway	Qualifying Race	Oldsmobile
Bruce Jacobi (USA) (Note: Having remained in a semicomatose state for four years, Jacobi died on February 4, 1987.)	February 17, 1983	UNO Twin 125	Daytona International Speedway	Qualifying Race	Pontiac
Terry Schoonover (USA)	November 11, 1984	Atlanta Journal 500	Atlanta International Raceway	Race	Chevrolet
Rick Baldwin (USA) (Note: Having remained in a coma for eleven years, Baldwin died on June 12, 1997.)	June 14, 1986	Miller American 400	Michigan International Speedway	Qualifying	Ford
Grant Adcox (USA)	November 19, 1989	Atlanta Journal 500	Atlanta International Raceway	Race	Oldsmobile
J. D. McDuffie (USA)	August 11, 1991	Budweiser at The Glen	Watkins Glen International	Race	Pontiac
Neil Bonnett (USA)	February 11, 1994	Daytona 500	Daytona International Speedway	Practice	Chevrolet
Rodney Orr (USA)	February 14, 1994	Daytona 500	Daytona International Speedway	Practice	Ford
Kenny Irwin Jr. (USA)	July 7, 2000	thatlook.com 300	New Hampshire Motor Speedway	Practice	Chevrolet
Dale Earnhardt (USA)	February 18, 2001	Daytona 500	Daytona International Speedway	Race	Chevrolet

==== Breakdown ====
Fatalities by circuit
Circuit (Note: The current, last, or best known name of the circuit is displayed.)	Total	First	Last
(Florida) Daytona International Speedway	8	1965	2001
(Pennsylvania) Langhorne Speedway	3	1952	1956
(North Carolina) Charlotte Motor Speedway	3	1964	1965
Memphis-Arkansas Speedway	2	1956	1956
(South Carolina) Darlington Raceway	2	1957	1965
(California) Riverside International Raceway	2	1964	1967
(Alabama) Talladega Superspeedway	2	1973	1975
(Georgia (U.S. state)) Atlanta Motor Speedway	2	1984	1989
(North Carolina) North Wilkesboro Speedway	1	1954	
Michigan International Speedway	1	1986	
(New York (state)) Watkins Glen International	1	1991	
New Hampshire Motor Speedway	1	2000	

Fatalities by decade
Decade	Total
1940s	0
1950s	7
1960s	7
1970s	4
1980s	5
1990s	3
2000s	2
2010s	0
2020s	0
All	28

=== Fatalities in other NASCAR events ===
Driver	Date of accident	Event	Circuit	Session	Series/Division/Tour/Class
Slick Davis (USA)	July 25, 1948	40-lap race	Greensboro Fairgrounds (Greensboro, North Carolina)	Feature race	Modified Division
Hank Stanley (USA) (Note: The 33-year-old plumber died on March 7, 1950, two days after his accident.)	March 5, 1950	100-lap race	Charlotte Speedway	Race	Modified Division
Walt Sprague (USA)	August 24, 1951		Monroe County Fairgrounds	Semifinal heat race	Sportsman Division
Rex Stansell (USA) (Note: The 35-year-old World War II veteran died on July 5, 1952, the day after his accident.)	July 4, 1952	200-mile race	Darlington International Raceway	Race	Sportsman Division/Modified Division
Bill Blevins (USA)	September 19, 1953	220-mile race	Raleigh Speedway	Race	Sportsman Division/Modified Division
Jesse Midkiff (USA)	September 19, 1953	220-mile race	Raleigh Speedway	Race	Sportsman Division/Modified Division
Dick Kaufman (USA)	February 20, 1954	125-mile race	Daytona Beach and Road Course	Race	Modified Division
Al Briggs (USA) (Note: The 30-year-old auto mechanic died on February 27, 1955, the day after his accident.)	February 26, 1955	125-mile race	Daytona Beach and Road Course	Race	Modified Division
Otis Eaton (USA) (Note: The 27-year-old World War II veteran died on May 16, 1955, two days after his accident.)	May 14, 1955		Fonda Speedway	Consolation race	Sportsman Division
Jimmy Knowlan (USA)	September 9, 1955	35-lap race	Islip Speedway	Feature race	Midget Division
Dickey Reynolds (USA)	June 8, 1956	25-lap race	Greensboro Fairgrounds (Greensboro, North Carolina)	Feature race	Midget Division
Hap Brown (USA) (Note: The 34-year-old nurse died on June 24, 1956, the day after his accident.)	June 23, 1956	25-lap race	Lancaster Speedway (Lancaster County, Pennsylvania)	Feature race	Midget Division
Earl Bryant (USA)	October 27, 1957	Lee Kirby Memorial	Concord Speedway	Race	Modified Division
Gwyn Staley (USA)	March 23, 1958	100-mile race	Richmond Raceway	Race	Convertible Division
Glenn Wagner (USA)	September 28, 1958	100-mile race	Syracuse Mile	Race	Sportsman Division
Red Bolduc (USA) (Note: The 36-year-old truck driver died on June 19, 1960, the day after his accident.)	June 18, 1960	40-lap race	Norwood Arena	Feature race	Cut down
Habe Haberling (USA)	February 21, 1961	250-mile race	Daytona International Speedway	Practice	Modified Division
Ray Platte (USA) (Note: Platte died on July 21, 1963, the day after his accident.)	July 20, 1963	100-lap race	South Boston Speedway	Feature race	Modified Division
Lou Smith (USA) (Note: The 24-year-old car dealership co-owner died on June 1, 1965, seventeen days after his accident.)	May 15, 1965	25-lap race	Fonda Speedway	Feature race	Sportsman Division
Pepper Eastman (USA)	August 14, 1965	20-lap race	Fonda Speedway	Consolation race	Sportsman Division
Max Wicke (USA)	September 10, 1966		Champion Speedway (Brisbane, California)	Heat race	Limited Sportsman
Cliff Rogalsky (USA)	June 3, 1967		San Jose Speedway (at East Tully Road & Quimby Road in San Jose, California)	Heat race	Super Modified
Don MacTavish (USA)	February 22, 1969	Daytona Permatex 300	Daytona International Speedway	Race	Late Model Sportsman Division
Art Ellis (USA)	July 3, 1971	30-lap race	Nashville Fairgrounds Speedway	Feature race	Late Model Sportsman Division
Link Toland (USA)	July 30, 1971	20-lap race	Clovis Speedway (Clovis, California)	Feature race	Super Modified
Lou Harton (USA)	August 17, 1973		Lee USA Speedway	Feature race	Modified (small block)
Bill Spencer (USA)	January 18, 1975	Permatex 200	Riverside International Raceway	Race	Late Model Sportsman Division
Bob Zwemke (USA) (Note: The 31-year-old driver died on September 26, 1975, six days after his accident.)	September 20, 1975		San Jose Speedway (at East Tully Road & Quimby Road in San Jose, California)	Practice	Super Modified
Sonny Easley (USA)	January 15, 1978	Stock Car Products 300	Riverside International Raceway	Practice	Modified Division
Don Williams (USA) (Note: Having remained in a semicomatose state for more than ten years, Williams died on May 21, 1989.)	February 17, 1979	Sportsman 300	Daytona International Speedway	Race	Late Model Sportsman Division
Tim Williamson (USA)	January 12, 1980	Stock Car Products 300	Riverside International Raceway	Race	Grand American Division
Dave Furioni (USA)	April 24, 1982		Riverside Park Speedway	Heat race	Modified Division/Winston Racing Series
Richie Evans (USA)	October 24, 1985	Winn-Dixie 500	Martinsville Speedway	Practice	Winston Modified Tour
Bob Bean (USA)	November 10, 1985	Alabama 200	Montgomery International Raceway	Race	All-American Challenge Series
Charles Ogle (USA) (Note: Ogle died on December 26, 1985, eleven days after his accident.)	December 15, 1985	Pontiac race car test	Daytona International Speedway	Testing	Daytona Dash Series
Joe Young (USA)	February 13, 1987	Komfort Koach 200	Daytona International Speedway	Race	Charlotte/Daytona Dash Series
Charlie Jarzombek (USA)	March 22, 1987	Miller 500 Classic	Martinsville Speedway	Race	Winston Modified Tour
Corky Cookman (USA)	July 19, 1987	Outside Pole Qualifier	Thompson Speedway Motorsports Park	Race	Winston Modified Tour
John Gay (USA) (Note: The 43-year-old laundromat contractor died on September 2, 1988, thirteen days after his accident.)	August 20, 1988	30-lap race	Evergreen Speedway	Feature race	Winston Racing Series (Super Stock)
Frank Carlotta (USA)	May 27, 1989		Santa Clara County Fairgrounds	B-Feature race	Winston Racing Series (Super Modified)
Don Pratt (USA)	September 17, 1989	Sunoco Race of Champions	Pocono Raceway	Feature race	Winston Modified Tour
Tony Jankowiak (USA)	April 22, 1990	Coors Spring Sizzler	Stafford Motor Speedway	Race	Winston Modified Tour
David Gaines (USA)	May 16, 1990	Sportsman 100	Charlotte Motor Speedway	Practice	Sportsman Division
Gary Batson (USA) (Note: The 40-year-old restaurateur died on May 16, 1992, the day after his accident.)	May 15, 1992	Winston Sportsman 100	Charlotte Motor Speedway	Qualifying Race	Igloo Sportsman Challenge
Troy Rouse (USA)	August 1, 1992	25-lap race	Tucson Speedway	Feature race	Winston Racing Series (Street Stock)
Clifford Allison (USA)	August 13, 1992	Detroit Gasket 200	Michigan International Speedway	Practice	Busch Grand National Series
Joe Booher (USA)	February 12, 1993	Florida 200	Daytona International Speedway	Race	Goody's Dash Series
Wayne McCarthy (USA) (Note: The 42-year-old drilling company owner died on June 4, 1994, the day after his accident.)	June 3, 1994		Speedway USA (Bolivar, Missouri)	Heat race	Winston Racing Series (Grand American Late Model)
Rayme Johnson (USA)	July 22, 1994		Speedway USA (Bolivar, Missouri)	Heat race	Winston Racing Series (Grand American Modified)
Billy Joe Pressley (USA) (Note: The 43-year-old baptist minister, who lost control of his car and wrecked, had coronary disease, which may have caused or contributed to his death.)	September 24, 1994	50-lap race	New Asheville Speedway	Race	Winston Racing Series (Late Model)
Russell Phillips (USA)	October 6, 1995	Winston 100	Charlotte Motor Speedway	Race	Sportsman Division
Mike Cooke (USA)	February 3, 1996	Skoal Bandit Copper World Classic	Phoenix Raceway	Qualifying	Featherlite Southwest Tour
John Nemechek (USA) (Note: Nemechek died on March 21, 1997, five days after his accident.)	March 16, 1997	Florida Dodge Dealers 400	Homestead–Miami Speedway	Race	Craftsman Truck Series
Adam Petty (USA)	May 12, 2000	Busch 200	New Hampshire Motor Speedway	Practice	Busch Series Grand National Division
Dwight Wrich (USA) (Note: The 38-year-old financial consultant died on October 1, 2000, the day after his accident.)	September 30, 2000	O'Reilly Auto Parts Hawkeye 100	Crawford County Speedway	Feature race	Grand National Limited Late Model
Tony Roper (USA) (Note: Roper died on October 14, 2000, the day after his accident.)	October 13, 2000	O'Reilly 400	Texas Motor Speedway	Race	Craftsman Truck Series
Michael Roberts (USA)	March 24, 2001	Private test	Lebanon I-44 Speedway	Testing	RE/MAX Challenge Series
Mark Hutto (USA)	April 13, 2002		Altamont Raceway Park	Feature race	Weekly Racing Series (Sportsman Late Model)
John Baker (USA)	June 8, 2002	K&N Filters 150	Irwindale Event Center	Race	Featherlite Southwest Series
Tom Baldwin Sr. (USA)	August 19, 2004	New England Dodge Dealers/Budweiser 150	Thompson Speedway Motorsports Park	Race	Featherlite Modified Series
John Blewett III (USA)	August 16, 2007	New England Dodge Dealers 150	Thompson Speedway Motorsports Park	Race	Whelen Modified Tour
Carlos Pardo (MEX) (Note: Having led the last completed green-flag lap, Pardo was declared the posthumous winner of the race, which was ended after his accident because of time constraints.)	June 14, 2009		Autódromo Miguel E. Abed	Race	Corona Series
Ron Casey (USA) (Note: The 61-year-old owner of a property maintenance company lost control of his car due to a medical event and sustained fatal impact injuries when hitting a wall. Different medical conditions contributed to his death on July 4, 2016, the day after his accident.)	July 3, 2016	WhistlePig Whiskey "Firecracker"	Devil's Bowl Speedway	Feature race	Whelen All-American Series (Sportsman Modified)
Shawn Balluzzo (USA)	July 11, 2020	Pepsi Race Night	Langley Speedway	Race	Advance Auto Parts Weekly Series (Modified)

=== Drivers who have died of a medical condition in NASCAR events ===
This list covers drivers who crashed their cars because of a fatal medical condition (i.e. drivers who did not die from the injuries they may have sustained in the ensuing accident) as well as those who managed to stop their cars but died of a medical condition shortly afterwards.

Driver	Date of incident	Event	Circuit	Session	Series/Division/Tour/Class	Medical condition
Gene Lovelace (USA)	July 3, 1970		Southside Speedway	Heat race	Late Model Sportsman Division	Having stopped in the pits, the 36-year-old upholstery shop owner had a fatal heart attack.
Bobby Isaac (USA)	August 13, 1977	Winston 200	Hickory Motor Speedway	Race	Late Model Sportsman Division	Having stopped in the pits, Isaac collapsed due to heat exhaustion and later had a heart attack, of which he died on August 14, 1977, the next day.
Bill Baker (USA)	August 12, 1978	Winston Sears Point 100	Sonoma Raceway	Practice	Winston West Grand National Series	Having finished a practice run, Baker had a fatal heart attack.
Larry Catlett (USA)	May 2, 1980	Cahaba Shrine Temple 100	Huntsville Speedway	Race	Grand American Division	The 38-year-old driver hit a wall but died of a heart attack.
John Nelson (USA)	May 29, 1982		Bowman Gray Stadium	Practice	Modified Division/Winston Racing Series	The 51-year-old operator of an auto repair shop slammed into a guard rail and was hit by another car but died of a heart attack.
Gary Neice (USA)	May 4, 1991	Carquest Auto Parts Stores 300	South Boston Speedway	Race	Busch Grand National Series	The 36-year-old professional race car driver hit a wall but died of a heart attack.
Hal Shuster (USA)	June 6, 1992	30-lap race	Cajon Speedway	Feature race	Winston Racing Series (Sportsman Stock)	Having stopped in the pits, the 49-year-old transmissions seller had a fatal diabetic seizure.
Edward Maness (USA)	July 10, 1993	Commercial Credit Night	Santa Fe Speedway	Race	Winston Racing Series	The 51-year-old driver struck a wall, having had a heart attack, of which he died on July 11, 1993, the next day.
Ron Biellier (USA)	July 15, 1994		Speedway USA (Bolivar, Missouri)	Race	Winston Racing Series (Late Model Stock)	The 45-year-old businessman brushed a wall but died of a heart attack.
Al Papini (USA)	April 1, 2001	40-lap race	Rockford Speedway	Feature race	Weekly Racing Series (Late Model)	The 41-year-old driver crashed into a wall but died of a heart attack.
Bubba Beck (USA)	June 1, 2002	25-lap race	Bowman Gray Stadium	Race	Weekly Racing Series (Modified)	The 66-year-old garage owner hit a guard rail but died of a heart attack.
Bub Bilodeau (USA)	June 5, 2010	40-lap race	Beech Ridge Motor Speedway	Feature race	Whelen All-American Series (Pro Series)	Having finished a rain-shortened race, the 53-year-old sales manager had a fatal heart attack.
Ron Pestana (USA)	July 14, 2012	15-lap race	All American Speedway	Feature race	Whelen All-American Series (Spectator class)	The 60-year-old real estate agent hit a wall but died of a heart attack.
Jimmy Smith (USA)	April 13, 2013	8-lap race	Thompson Speedway Motorsports Park	Heat race	Whelen All-American Series (SK Modified)	Having finished a race, the 62-year-old driver, who worked in the fastener/seals industry, had a fatal heart attack.
Leon Gonyo (USA)	September 19, 2015	Mekkelsen RV Vermont 200	Devil's Bowl Speedway	Feature race	Whelen All-American Series (Modified)	The 63-year-old buildings, grounds, and transportation superintendent hit a wall while taking a victory lap but died of a stroke.
Terry Stevenson (USA)	May 27, 2018	20-lap race	Devil's Bowl Speedway	Feature race	Whelen All-American Series (Super Stock)	The 62-year-old heavy equipment mechanic lightly brushed a wall but died of cardiac arrest.
Robbie Brewer (USA)	August 9, 2025	20-lap race	Bowman Gray Stadium	Feature race	NASCAR Advance Auto Parts Weekly Series (Sportsman late model)	The 53-year-old veteran had an unspecified medical emergency coming down to take a restart and hit the turn 4 wall. He was extracted from the car and rushed to a nearby hospital, where he was pronounced dead.

== Non-driver fatalities ==
This section lists people who have been fatally injured in close connection to the racing taking place at an event while not driving a race car including drivers being on the sidelines.

=== NASCAR Cup Series fatalities ===
Name	Role	Date of accident	Event	Circuit	Session
Steven Clark (USA)	Police officer	August 19, 1956	250-mile race	Bay Meadows Racetrack	Race
William Thomasson (USA)	Spectator	October 20, 1957	100-mile race	North Wilkesboro Speedway	Race
Paul McDuffie (USA)	Crew Chief/Mechanic	September 5, 1960	Southern 500	Darlington Raceway	Race
Charles Sweatland (USA)	Mechanic	September 5, 1960	Southern 500	Darlington Raceway	Race
Joe Taylor (USA)	Official	September 5, 1960	Southern 500	Darlington Raceway	Race
Ronald Pickle (USA)	Spectator	January 17, 1965	Motor Trend 500	Riverside International Raceway	Race
Randy Owens (USA)	Team member	May 4, 1975	Winston 500	Talladega Superspeedway	Race
Dennis Wade (USA)	Mechanic	March 18, 1979	Atlanta 500	Atlanta Motor Speedway	Race
Mike Rich (USA)	Mechanic	November 18, 1990	Atlanta Journal 500	Atlanta Motor Speedway	Race

=== Fatalities in other NASCAR events ===
Name	Role	Date of accident	Event	Circuit	Session	Series/Division/Tour/Class
Roy Brannon (USA) (Note: The seven-year-old boy died on July 26, 1948, the day after the accident.)	Spectator	July 25, 1948	40-lap race	Columbus Speedway (Columbus, Georgia)	Feature race	Modified Division
Joe Salek (USA)	Spectator	May 28, 1955	John E. Larrabee Trophy	Fonda Speedway	Race	Sportsman Division
Ray (Darney) Albert (USA) (Note: Ray Albert used the name Ray Darney when driving a race car.)	Driver	August 26, 1960		Kearney Bowl	Heat race	Sportsman Division
Richard Gough (USA)	Spectator	October 12, 1963		Winston-Salem Fairgrounds	Race	Modified Division
Howard Betts (USA)	Official	August 12, 1967		Atlantic City Speedway (Pleasantville, New Jersey)	Qualifying	
Pat Pattison (USA)	Official	September 2, 1973	Rainier 200	Evergreen Speedway	Race	Grand National West Series
Douglas Grunst (USA)	Team member	January 15, 1978	Stock Car Products 300	Riverside International Raceway	Practice	Modified Division
Frank Cervoni (USA)	Mechanic	August 28, 1982	Weld-Built 200	Islip Speedway	Feature race	Modified Division/Winston Racing Series
Rene Bourgois (USA)	Team member	September 18, 1993		Stockton 99 Speedway (Stockton, California)	B-Feature race	Winston Racing Series (Late Model Sportsman)
Jimmy Davies (USA)	Team member	October 17, 1998	Dodge Dealers 200K	Lime Rock Park	Race	Busch North Series
Virginia Whyel (USA) (Note: The 64-year-old woman died on July 22, 2001, the day after the accident.)	Spectator	July 21, 2001		Lorain County Speedway	Race	Weekly Racing Series (Late Model)

== See also ==
- List of NASCAR drivers who died during their careers
- Death of Dale Earnhardt
- List of Daytona International Speedway fatalities

== General references ==
- Motorsport Memorial
