= List of Daytona International Speedway fatalities =

Since its opening in 1959, Daytona International Speedway has seen 41 on-track fatalities: 24 car drivers, 12 motorcyclists, 3 go-kart drivers, 1 powerboat racer, and 1 track worker. The most notable death was that of Dale Earnhardt, who was killed on the last lap of the Daytona 500 on February 18, 2001.

== Fatalities ==
Name	Date of accident	Vehicle	Sanction	Event	Session	Course of events	References
Marshall Teague	February 11, 1959	Car	USAC	Speed record attempt	Testing	Teague was at the wheel of a "Sumar Special," a reconfigured Indy car with a canopy and streamlined fenders, classified as Formula Libre. When he entered the west turn, the high-speed aerodynamic lift caused his racer to spin and flip end-over-end, throwing Teague, still strapped to his seat, from the car. He was killed instantly.	
George Amick	April 4, 1959	Car	USAC	Daytona 100	Race	Exiting the west turn, Amick's "Bowes Seal Fast Special" Indy car smashed into the outer guard rail on the backstretch straightaway, overturned, and traveled upside down before coming to a standstill in the infield. Amick died instantly.	
Byrne E. Taylor	June 14, 1959	Boat	APBA	Southeastern States outboard championships on Lake Lloyd	Heat race	Approaching the west turn, Taylor's C racing runabout spun, flipped and ejected him into the water where he was hit by an onrushing competitor. The 53-year-old physician was pronounced dead on arrival at Halifax Hospital from a broken neck.	
Martin Every	June 18, 1960	Car		American Motors passenger car test	Testing	Leaving the east turn, Every lost control of his Rambler, apparently due to a blown tire, and overturned. The 23-year-old amateur racing driver died at Halifax Hospital about an hour later.	
Habe Haberling	February 21, 1961	Car	NASCAR	250-mile race	Practice	Having entered the east turn, Haberling's modified Chevrolet spun sideways, veered down the banking, and ran it up again before rolling over several times and coming to a stop near the infield grass. Haberling was killed instantly.	
Billy Wade	January 5, 1965	Car		Goodyear tire test	Testing	Wade was approaching the west turn when his Mercury blew a tire. After ramming and sliding along the outer retaining wall, the car skidded down to the apron, ran up the turn, crashed into the wall sideways and jerked to a halt. Wade was pronounced dead on arrival at Halifax Hospital from internal and head injuries.	
Don MacTavish	February 22, 1969	Car	NASCAR	Daytona Permatex 300	Race	Coming out of the east turn, MacTavish hit an opening in the outside wall covered by metal guard rail, shearing off the front of his Mercury Comet, which was then struck by Sam Sommers. MacTavish was killed instantly.	
Wayne Bartz	March 12, 1969	Bike		Lightweight race	Race	Riding a Suzuki, Bartz crashed into two downed bikes on the east turn. He was flung through the air and slammed on the ground. The 30-year-old truck salesman died of multiple injuries in the speedway hospital a short time later.	
Tab Prince	February 19, 1970	Car	NASCAR	125-mile race	Qualifying Race (Note: The race also served as a points-paying championship round.)	A blown engine caused Prince's Dodge Charger Daytona to slide sideways as it was going into the west turn where it was t-boned by Bill Seifert. Prince died instantly of a broken back and a compressed spinal cord.	
Rusty Bradley	March 14, 1971	Bike	AMA	Daytona 200	Race	Entering the first turn into the infield, Bradley lost control of his Kawasaki H1R and his helmeted head hit the track. The 21-year-old college student died of skull injuries in Halifax Hospital several hours later.	
David Pearl	July 31, 1971	Car	SCCA (Central Florida Region)	Paul Whiteman Trophy	Race	Coming to a halt in the center of the track after spinning out, Pearl's Brabham BT29 was broadsided by Milo Vega on the west infield turn of the road course. The 30-year-old university graduate was declared dead on arrival at the track hospital, having sustained a broken neck and a fractured skull.	
Friday Hassler	February 17, 1972	Car	NASCAR	125-mile race	Qualifying Race	Hassler was involved in a multi-car pileup on the backstretch. His Chevrolet hit a wall, spun, and was struck by Jimmy Crawford's car, which knocked Hassler back into the wall. He was dead of neck and head injuries.	
Don Williams	February 17, 1979	Car	NASCAR	Sportsman 300	Race	Coming out of turn two, Williams, who was driving a Chevrolet Chevelle, was involved in a multi-car pileup. He incurred permanent brain damage, which left him in a semicomatose state until his death on May 21, 1989.	
Ricky Knotts	February 14, 1980	Car	NASCAR	125-mile race	Qualifying Race	Going into turn one, Knotts, driving an Oldsmobile, made contact with Slick Johnson, crashed into the outside wall, collided with Blackie Wangerin, and skidded across the track and the infield grass before slamming into a concrete wall passengerside. Knotts's cause of death were head injuries.	
Bruce Jacobi	February 17, 1983	Car	NASCAR	UNO Twin 125	Qualifying Race	Caught by a gusty headwind exiting turn two, Jacobi drifted towards the wet infield grass where his Pontiac became airborne and somersaulted until it came to a stop near a dirt bank. Jacobi sustained head injuries and remained semicomatose until his death on February 4, 1987.	
Francis Affleck	February 7, 1985	Car	ARCA	Daytona ARCA 200	Practice	Entering the backstretch, Affleck's Ford started to spin and flipped several times. Due to window net failure, Affleck was partially ejected, sustaining head and neck injuries. He was pronounced dead at Halifax Medical Center shortly after the crash.	
Charles Ogle	December 15, 1985	Car		Pontiac race car test	Testing	A tire failure led to Ogle's Pontiac Sunbird digging into the infield grass near the bus stop chicane and becoming airborne. The car landed on its roof and only stopped sliding near an infield embankment. Ogle, a Daytona Dash Series competitor, died from head injuries at Halifax Medical Center eleven days later.	
Joe Young	February 13, 1987	Car	NASCAR	Komfort Koach 200	Race	Involved in a multi-car pileup while competing in the Charlotte/Daytona Dash Series, Young's Chevrolet Cavalier was slowly sliding backwards between turns three and four when hit almost head-on by Duell Sturgill with the impact ripping apart the front end of Young's car. The 38-year-old auto mechanic was pronounced dead of multiple internal injuries at Halifax Medical Center.	
James Kolman	December 27, 1987	Kart	WKA	Enduro World Championships	Practice	About to enter the infield section of the road course, Kolman, driving a Yamaha in the S Lite Class, left the course and hit a barrier. A short time later, the 25-year-old computer employee was pronounced dead at Halifax Medical Center.	
Randy Glenn	February 27, 1988	Bike	CCS	Lightweight Superbike/SuperTwin races	Practice	Exiting the infield section of the road course, Glenn crashed his Kawasaki EX500. The 38-year-old hobby motorcyclist was pronounced dead of massive head injuries at the infield care center.	
Dale Robertson	December 27, 1989	Kart	WKA	Enduro World Championships	Race	Starting in the Sprint Sit-Up class, Robertson and several other drivers were involved in a crash. The 26-year-old racer died of massive head and chest injuries.	
Slick Johnson	February 11, 1990	Car	ARCA	Daytona ARCA 200	Race	Between turns three and four, Johnson lost control of his Pontiac Grand Prix, which was sliding sideways when hit by David Simko's car and thus deflected into the outside wall from where it rebounded into the path of an oncoming spinning car before being broadsided by another one near the infield. Johnson sustained a basilar skull fracture, a crushed chest, and other internal injuries. He died at Halifax Medical Center three days later.	
Joe Booher	February 12, 1993	Car	NASCAR	Florida 200	Race	Entering turn one during a Goody's Dash Series competition, the right rear of Booher's Chevrolet Beretta clipped the left front of Carl Horton's car, which sent Booher head-on into the outside wall. Coming down across the track, he was struck in the right front by Rodney White. Booher was pronounced dead of massive head and internal injuries at Halifax Medical Center.	
James Adamo	March 7, 1993	Bike	AMA	Daytona 200	Race	Exiting the infield course, Adamo's Ducati 888 went straight into a stack of hay bales before striking a retaining wall and guardrail head-on. Presumably, the crash was caused by front brake failure. The 36-year-old motorcycle parts shop owner died instantly of major head injuries.	
Neil Bonnett	February 11, 1994	Car	NASCAR	Daytona 500	Practice	Bonnett's Chevrolet Lumina swerved when coming off turn four, slid onto the apron, went up the banking, and crashed into the wall nearly head-on. Bonnett was pronounced dead of massive head injuries at Halifax Medical Center a little later.	
Rodney Orr	February 14, 1994	Car	NASCAR	Daytona 500	Practice	Entering turn two, Orr's Ford Thunderbird spun onto the apron, went up the banking, flipped over, and hit the wall roof-first. The crash, in which Orr was killed instantly, was triggered by a broken mounting stud, a part that holds the shock absorber to the car.	
Michael Himes	January 31, 1997	Car	IMSA	Two-Hour Endurance Championship	Race	Having entered the bus stop chicane, Himes's Honda Civic del Sol Si, instead of turning right, hit a tire wall head-on. The 42-year-old driver, who had retired from working in the computer chip manufacturing industry, was pronounced dead of severe trauma at Halifax Medical Center several hours after the crash.	
Roger Reiman	March 4, 1997	Bike		BMW Battle of the Legends	Practice	A collision involving several motorcycles caused Reiman to be thrown from his bike on the infield section of the road course. The 58-year-old Harley-Davidson dealer was pronounced dead at Halifax Medical Center.	
Chad Matteson	October 31, 1997	Bike	NASB	Lightweight Sport Bike/GT3 race	Practice	Coming out of the infield section of the road course, Matteson crashed on his Yamaha 400. The 24-year-old motorcycle mechanic was declared brain dead at Halifax Medical Center on the same day.	
Chris Tatro	March 2, 2000	Bike	CCS/PACE		Practice	Riding a 600cc Kawasaki, Tatro crashed into the outside retaining wall on the high bank off turn four. A short time later, the 22-year-old college graduate, who had been accepted to dental school, died of head injuries and multiple trauma at Halifax Medical Center.	
Dale Earnhardt	February 18, 2001	Car	NASCAR	Daytona 500	Race	Going into turn four on the last lap, the rear of Earnhardt's Chevrolet Monte Carlo made contact with Sterling Marlin's front bumper, which caused Earnhardt to briefly slide towards the apron before shooting up the banking. His car was hit passengerside by an oncoming Ken Schrader so that the two cars were deflected towards the outside wall, which Earnhardt hit at a sharp angle. Both cars slid down the track, coming to a halt on the infield grass. Earnhardt died instantly of a basilar skull fracture, but was not pronounced dead until his arrival at Halifax Medical Center.	
Dirk Piz	March 11, 2001	Bike	AMA	Buell Pro Thunder Sprint	Race	Entering the bus stop chicane, Piz's Ducati 748 collided with Kiyoshige Watanabe's crashed bike, was lifted up, and sent Piz into a barrier. The 45-year-old privateer was pronounced dead of internal injuries at Halifax Medical Center.	
Stuart Stratton	October 19, 2001	Bike	CCS	Fall Cycle Scene	Pre-race	Practicing a start on his GTO Expert Yamaha YZF-R6 on pit road, Stratton, whose view may have been obscured by another bike, hit and hurt an official before veering into the pit wall headfirst. The 35-year-old underwater robot pilot-technician was pronounced dead at Halifax Medical Center.	
Michael Davis Jr.	December 30, 2001	Kart	WKA	Dunlop Tire National Road Racing Series World Championships	Race	Davis, a 17-year-old high school senior who was entered in the Yamaha Sportsman Lite category, was either killed by suddenly veering sideways and hitting a wall on the infield road course or by being bumped from behind and thrown from his kart in turn four.	
Bryan Cassell Jr.	October 18, 2003	Bike	CCS/FUSA	Fall Cycle Scene	Practice	Slowing down at the exit of turn four, Cassell was rammed and run over by Jeff Tatham, who could not evade Cassell's Lightweight/ThunderBike Ducati. The 28-year-old rookie was pronounced dead at Halifax Medical Center.	
Roy Weaver III	February 8, 2004	Car	IPOWERacing	IPOWER Dash 150	Race	Weaver was picking up debris on turn two during a caution period of an IPOWER Dash Series competition, when he was struck by the Pontiac Sunfire driven by Ray Paprota: Once Paprota spotted the track worker, he hit his brakes but went into a lateral slide and caught Weaver with the rear of the passenger side. The 44-year-old safety crew supervisor was killed instantly. His death was ruled an accident by the Daytona Beach Police Department.	
Robert Boswell	February 3, 2008	Car		Richard Petty Driving Experience	Racing school	Boswell, slumped over the steering wheel and driving erratically, skidded down the turn two embankment and hit a retaining wall. A medical examiner found that the 60-year-old man had had a heart attack.	
Alan Burgess	August 9, 2009	Car	SCCA (Central Florida Region)	Daytona Double SARRC	Race	Burgess managed to drive his flaming GT-2 Porsche 944 into the pits, but by the time the fire was extinguished the 54-year-old facilities director had sustained severe burns, of which he died at an Orlando hospital 15 days later.	
Eric Desy	October 17, 2013	Bike		Team Hammer Advanced Riding School	Racing school	After Shaw, a 65-year-old instructor, and Desy, his 45-year-old student, had collided on an oval turn, they were admitted to Halifax Health Medical Center where they died from their injuries on the same day.	
Rick Shaw	October 17, 2013	Bike		Team Hammer Advanced Riding School	Racing school	After Shaw, a 65-year-old instructor, and Desy, his 45-year-old student, had collided on an oval turn, they were admitted to Halifax Health Medical Center where they died from their injuries on the same day.	
Mark Mathys	October 28, 2023	Car	Audi Club	International GT	Practice	Mathys suffered a flat tire and pulled to the inside apron at the exit of the tri-oval. 24-year old Marcel Fayen's was involved in a crash, and impacted Mathy's car on the passenger side. Mathys was either killed instantly or en route to the hospital.	

== See also ==
- List of NASCAR fatalities
- List of driver deaths in motorsport
