= Trenton Speedway =

Motorsport venue in Trenton, New Jersey, United States

- The "kidney bean" shaped oval (1969–1980)
- Location: Hamilton Township, Mercer County, near Trenton, New Jersey
- Coordinates: 40°14′20.5″N 74°43′01.5″W
- Owner: George A. Hamid Jr.
- Opened: September 24, 1900; 126 years ago
- Closed: June 29, 1980; 46 years ago
- Former names: Trenton International Speedway
- Major events: CART; Trenton 150 (1946, 1949, 1957–1979); NASCAR Winston Cup; Northern 300 (1958–1959, 1967–1972)

Dog-leg oval "Kidney Bean" (1969–1980)
- Surface: Asphalt
- Length: 1.500 mi (2.414 km)
- Turns: 5
- Banking: Turns 1–2: 10° Dogleg: 4° Turns 3–4: 15°

Mile oval (1946–1968)
- Surface: Asphalt (1957–1968); Dirt (1946–1957)
- Length: 1.000 mi (1.609 km)

Half-mile oval (1900–1941)
- Surface: Dirt
- Length: 0.500 mi (0.805 km)

Trenton Speedway was a racing facility located near Trenton, New Jersey at the New Jersey State Fairgrounds. Races for the United States' premier open-wheel and full-bodied racing series of the times were held at Trenton Speedway.

== Racing history ==
The first race at the Fairgrounds was held on September 24, 1900, but there was no further racing there until 1907. Regular racing began in 1912 and continued until 1941. A new 1.000 mi (1.609 km) dirt oval was opened in 1946. In 1957 the track was paved. It operated in that configuration until 1968 when the track was expanded to 1.500 mi (2.414 km) and a "kidney bean" shape with a 20° right-hand dogleg on the back stretch and a wider turn 3 & 4 complex than turns 1 & 2. The track closed in 1980 and the Fairgrounds itself closed 3 years later. The former site of the speedway is now occupied by the Grounds for Sculpture, a UPS shipping facility, and the housing development known as "Hamilton Lakes".

== Championship cars ==
Trenton was a long-time stop for the AAA and USAC Championship Car series. Its first recognized Champ Car race was held in 1949 on the dirt mile. The series did not return until 1957 when the track was paved, but when it did, at least one Champ Car race was held every year until 1979. The final Champ Car races held in 1979 at the track were sanctioned by CART. During his career A. J. Foyt won twelve Indy Car races at Trenton Speedway. The May 1976 race was Janet Guthrie's first IndyCar appearance.

== Stock cars ==
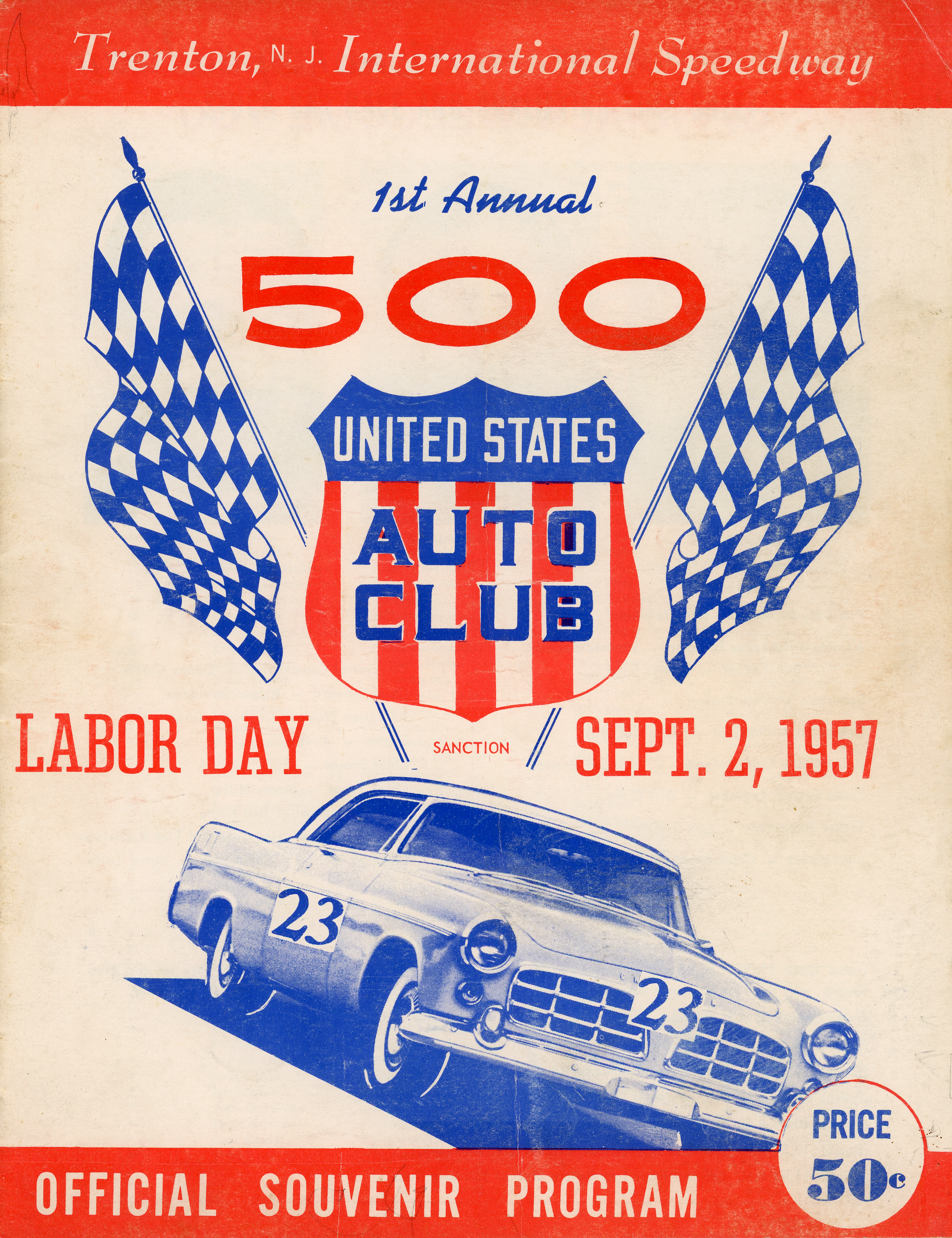
Program cover for the 1957 Trenton 500

Trenton hosted many races sanctioned by AAA and USAC Stock Car divisions. In 1957, Mike Klapak won the Trenton 500, intended to become the most prestigious race on the USAC calendar.

Trenton hosted the NASCAR Grand National and Winston Cup series 8 times: once each May in 1958 and 1959, and once each July from 1967 to 1972, a race known as the Northern 300. Richard Petty led all drivers with three Trenton Grand National victories. In July 1973 the Northern 300 ran time trials but rain washed out the race and it was never rescheduled. The Northern 300 was placed on NASCAR's 1974 Winston Cup Grand National schedule (Stock Car Racing magazine listed it on the schedule in its early 1974 season issues) but was dropped early in the year and replaced by Pocono Raceway's Purolator 500.

== Major races for NASCAR Modifieds ==
=== National Championship races ===
From 1958 to 1971, a NASCAR National Championship race for modified stock car racing was held annually at Trenton Speedway, promoted by Sam Nunis. Through 1962, these were hundred-lap races. In 1963, the race was expanded to 200 laps, making it one of the longest and highest-paying races for Modified and Sportsman racers in the country. Ray Hendrick from Virginia was the leading winner of these races, driving the Jack Tant-owned number 11.

=== Race of Champions ===
From 1972 to 1976, Trenton Speedway hosted the Race of Champions modified race. Five different drivers won the five RoC events at Trenton. In 1977, the Race of Champions was moved to Pocono Raceway.

== Race results ==
All winning drivers were American.

=== AAA/USAC/CART Championship Car ===
Season	Date	Winning driver	Chassis	Engine	Team
AAA Championship Car (Dirt 1 mile oval)
1949	June 19	Myron Fohr	Marchese	Offenhauser	
1950–1956: Not held
USAC Championship Car
1 Mile Paved Oval
1957	September 29	Pat O'Connor	Kuzma	Offenhauser	
1958	March 30	Len Sutton	Kuzma	Offenhauser	
1958	September 28	Rodger Ward	Lesovsky	Offenhauser	
1959	April 19	Tony Bettenhausen	Kuzma	Offenhauser	
1959	September 27	Eddie Sachs	Meskowski	Offenhauser	
1960	April 10	Rodger Ward	Watson	Offenhauser	
1960	September 25	Eddie Sachs	Kuzma	Offenhauser	
1961	April 9	Eddie Sachs	Ewing	Offenhauser	
1961	September 24	Eddie Sachs	Kuzma	Offenhauser	
1962	April 8	A. J. Foyt	Meskowski	Offenhauser	
1962	July 22	Rodger Ward	Watson	Offenhauser	
1962	September 23	Don Branson	Watson	Offenhauser	
1963	April 21	A. J. Foyt	Meskowski	Offenhauser	
1963	July 28	A. J. Foyt	Trevis	Offenhauser	
1963	September 22	A. J. Foyt	Trevis	Offenhauser	
1964	April 19	A. J. Foyt	Watson	Offenhauser	
1964	July 19	A. J. Foyt	Watson	Offenhauser	
1964	September 27	Parnelli Jones	Lotus	Ford	
1965	April 25	Jim McElreath	Brabham	Offenhauser	
1965	July 18	A. J. Foyt	Lotus	Ford	
1965	September 26	A. J. Foyt	Lotus	Ford	
1966	April 24	Rodger Ward	Lola	Offenhauser	
1966	September 25	Mario Andretti	Brawner	Ford	
1967	April 23	Mario Andretti	Brawner	Ford	
1967	September 24	A. J. Foyt	Coyote	Ford	
1968	April 21	Bobby Unser	Eagle	Offenhauser	
1968	September 22	Mario Andretti	Brawner	Offenhauser	Andretti Racing Enterprises
1.5 Mile Kidney Bean Oval
1969	July 19	Mario Andretti	Brawner	Ford	
1969	September 21	Mario Andretti	Brawner	Ford	
1970	April 26	Lloyd Ruby	Laycock	Offenhauser	
1970	October 3	Al Unser	Colt	Offenhauser	
1971	April 25	Mike Mosley	Watson	Ford	
1971	October 3	Bobby Unser	Eagle	Offenhauser	
1972	April 23	Gary Bettenhausen	McLaren	Offenhauser	Penske Racing
1972	September 24	Bobby Unser	Eagle	Offenhauser	
1973	April 15	A. J. Foyt	Coyote	Foyt	
1973	April 15	Mario Andretti	Parnelli	Offenhauser	
1973	September 23	Gordon Johncock	Eagle	Offenhauser	
1974	April 7	Bobby Unser	Eagle	Offenhauser	
1974	September 22	A. J. Foyt	Coyote	Foyt	
1974	September 22	Bobby Unser	Eagle	Offenhauser	
1975	April 6	A. J. Foyt	Coyote	Foyt	
1975	September 21	Gordon Johncock	Wildcat	DGS	
1976	May 2	Johnny Rutherford	McLaren	Offenhauser	McLaren Racing
1976	August 15	Gordon Johncock	Wildcat	DGS	
1977	April 30	Wally Dallenbach Sr.	Wildcat	DGS	
1978	April 23	Gordon Johncock	Wildcat	DGS	
1978	September 23	Mario Andretti	Penske	Cosworth	Penske Racing
CART Champ Car
1979	June 10	Bobby Unser	Penske	Cosworth	Penske Racing
1979	June 10	Bobby Unser	Penske	Cosworth	Penske Racing
1979	August 19	Rick Mears	Penske	Cosworth	Penske Racing

=== NASCAR Grand National/Winston Cup ===
Season	Date	Winning driver	Manufacturer
1958	May 30 – 500 miles	Fireball Roberts	Chevrolet
1959	May 17 – 500 miles	Tom Pistone	Ford
1967	July 9 – 300 miles	Richard Petty	Plymouth
1968	July 14	LeeRoy Yarbrough	Ford
1969	July 13	David Pearson	Ford
1970	July 12	Richard Petty	Plymouth
1971	July 18	Richard Petty	Plymouth
1972	July 16	Bobby Allison	Chevrolet
