= Oswego County Fairgrounds =

- Interactive map of Oswego County Fairgrounds
- Location: Sandy Creek, New York
- Coordinates: 43.6583°N 76.0902°W
- Area: 50 acres (20 hectares)
- Operator: Oswego County Agricultural Society
- Status: Open
- Website: Official website

The Oswego County Fairgrounds is the home of the annual Oswego County Fair. The fairgrounds are open year-round and host a number of events. It is located on Ellisburg Street in Sandy Creek, New York.

== History ==
In spring 1840 the Oswego County Agricultural Society was organized and the first fair exhibit was held in the city of Oswego, New York, the following October. In subsequent years the fair moved from town to town, and in 1855 the Agricultural Society chose Mexico, New York, as the permanent location for the county fair. The grounds consisted of 14 acres purchased from Orson Ames. Due to financial difficulties, the last fair was held in Mexico in 1887 and the annual fair continued to be held in a variety of locations.

The 1937 Oswego County Fair joined with the pre-existing regional fair at the Sandy Creek Fairgrounds, which then became the lasting venue for the county fair. The Sandy Creek, Richland, Orwell and Boylston Agricultural Society had conducted an annual fair since 1858 on the land donated by Oren R. Earl, and participation had already grown to include the neighboring towns of Ellisburg, Lorraine, Redfield, Albion, Williamstown and Parish.

== Events ==
=== Oswego County Fair ===
The annual fair brings rides, food, live music and myriad attractions to the region for five days. Recent draws have included a rodeo, demolition derby, and truck and tractor pulls.

=== Family Fall Festival ===
The fall event provides a carnival atmosphere, complete with rides, festival foods, live music, and a host of vendors offering products made locally. Featured activities include a Scarecrow Contest for children.

=== Stock car racing ===
Operating as the North Country Speedway (aka Sandy Creek Speedway), the fairground's harness racing track hosted the inaugural season for the NASCAR Sportsman Division (predecessor of the NASCAR O'Reilly Auto Parts Series). In 1951 a second inner 1/4-mile (0.40 km) oval was added to the facility's 1/2-mile (0.80 km) dirt oval.
