= Larry Mann =

- Born: Lawrence Harold Zuckerman; April 3, 1924; Yonkers, New York, U.S.
- Died: September 14, 1952 (aged 28); Philadelphia, Pennsylvania, U.S.
- Cause of death: Pulmonary hemorrhage, massive head wounds from racing accident

NASCAR Cup Series career
- 6 races run over 1 year
- First race: 1952 - 9th race of season (Langhorne)
- Last race: 1952 - 27th race of season (Langhorne)
Wins	Top tens	Poles
0	0	0

Larry Mann (born Lawrence Harold Zuckerman; April 3, 1924 – September 14, 1952) was an American stock car driver born in Yonkers, New York. Mann was the first driver to be killed in a NASCAR Grand National race; he died from a pulmonary hemorrhage caused by a crash at Langhorne Speedway.

== NASCAR career ==
Mann participated in six races in the 1952 season. Overall, after his appearance in the ninth race of the season, Mann began racing more commonly after the 19th race, appearing in every other event; his best finish (11th) came at Monroe County Fairgrounds in Rochester, New York.

== Death ==
Mann was killed during the 27th race of the 1952 season, which took place in Langhorne, Pennsylvania. On the 189th lap, he crashed through a fence at the track, thereby flipping his Hudson Hornet. After being rushed to Nazareth Hospital in nearby Philadelphia, he died in the evening of a pulmonary hemorrhage and massive head wounds. Mann had been defying a superstition among NASCAR drivers by painting his vehicle green.

Mann would become the first of three drivers to be killed at Langhorne within five years; Frank Arford and John McVitty also perished while racing at the track in 1953 and 1956, respectively.
