= Francis Affleck =

Canadian racing driver

- Born: March 4, 1950; Moose Jaw, Saskatchewan, Canada
- Died: February 7, 1985 (aged 34); Daytona International Speedway; Daytona Beach, Florida, U.S.
- Cause of death: Racing accident

NASCAR O'Reilly Auto Parts Series career
- 3 races run over 1 year
- Best finish: 66th (1984)
- First race: 1984 Goody's 300 (Daytona)
- Last race: 1984 Dixie Cup 200 (DARLINGTON)
Wins	Top tens	Poles
0	0	0

Francis Archibald Affleck (March 4, 1950 – February 7, 1985) was a Canadian race car driver.

== Career ==
Affleck raced late model NASCAR as a hobby when he was living in the Montreal, Quebec suburb of Greenfield Park. He continued racing in NASCAR late models at local tracks and ARCA when he moved to Charlotte in 1977.

In practice for the ARCA 200 race at Daytona International Speedway on February 7, 1985 while travelling at an estimated 195 miles per hour, Affleck got his car sideways between turns 1 and 2, went airborne, and barrel-rolled end-over-end at least seven or eight times. The protective window netting on his car failed and Affleck was thrown partially out of his car and sustained head and neck injuries after being pinned under his Ford. Affleck's crash also changed the way that the protective window nettings are constructed on both NASCAR and ARCA cars to this day. Affleck became the first ARCA driver to be fatally injured at the Daytona International Speedway in its then 26-year history, and the first driver to be killed at the track since Ricky Knotts in 1980.

Affleck was the eldest of five children of Bill and Velma Affleck. He was survived by Kathleen, his wife of 15 years, and two sons.

== Motorsports career results ==
=== NASCAR ===
(key) (Bold – Pole position awarded by qualifying time. Italics – Pole position earned by points standings or practice time. * – Most laps led.)

==== Busch Series ====
NASCAR Busch Series results
Year	Team	No.	Make	1	2	3	4	5	6	7	8	9	10	11	12	13	14	15	16	17	18	19	20	21	22	23	24	25	26	27	28	29	NBSC	Pts	Ref
1984	Caspro Racing	09	Mercury	DAY; 31	RCH	CAR; 21	HCY	MAR	DAR; 18	ROU	NSV	LGY	MLW	DOV	CLT	SBO	HCY	ROU	SBO	ROU	HCY	IRP	LGY	SBO	BRI	DAR	RCH	NWS	CLT	HCY	CAR	MAR	66th	179	

=== ARCA Talladega SuperCar Series ===
(key) (Bold – Pole position awarded by qualifying time. Italics – Pole position earned by points standings or practice time. * – Most laps led.)

ARCA Talladega SuperCar Series results
Year	Team	No.	Make	1	2	3	4	5	6	7	8	9	10	11	12	13	14	ATSSC	Pts	Ref
1985	Caspro Racing	09	Mercury	ATL	DAY; DNQ	ATL	TAL	ATL	SSP	IRP	CSP	FRS	IRP	OEF	ISF	DSF	TOL	NA	-	

== See also ==
- List of Daytona International Speedway fatalities
