= Mike Klapak =

American racing driver (1913–1997)

- Born: Michael Klapak; March 8, 1913 Youngstown, Ohio, U.S.
- Died: March 13, 1997 (aged 84) Niles, Ohio, U.S.
- Retired: 1964
- Debut season: 1931
- Car number: 23

Previous series
- 1931-1947 1949-1954 1957-1962: Midget car racing Modified racing USAC Stock Car

Championship titles
- 1950, 1951, 1952 NASCAR National Sportsman Champion; 1954, 1955 MARC Sportsman Champion

NASCAR Cup Series career
- 13 races run over 4 years
- Best finish: 98th (1950)
- First race: 1950 Poor Man's 500 (Canfield)
- Last race: 1953 Race 5 (Charlotte)
Wins	Top tens	Poles
0	3	0

ARCA Menards Series career
- Incomplete stats available 75+ races run over 12 years
Wins	Top tens	Poles
2+	37+	3+

Michael Klapak (March 8, 1913 – March 13, 1997) was an American racing driver. Klapak won three championships of the NASCAR Sportsman division, in 1950, 1951, and 1952. He also competed in USAC Stock Cars, winning the 1957 Trenton 500.

== Racing career ==
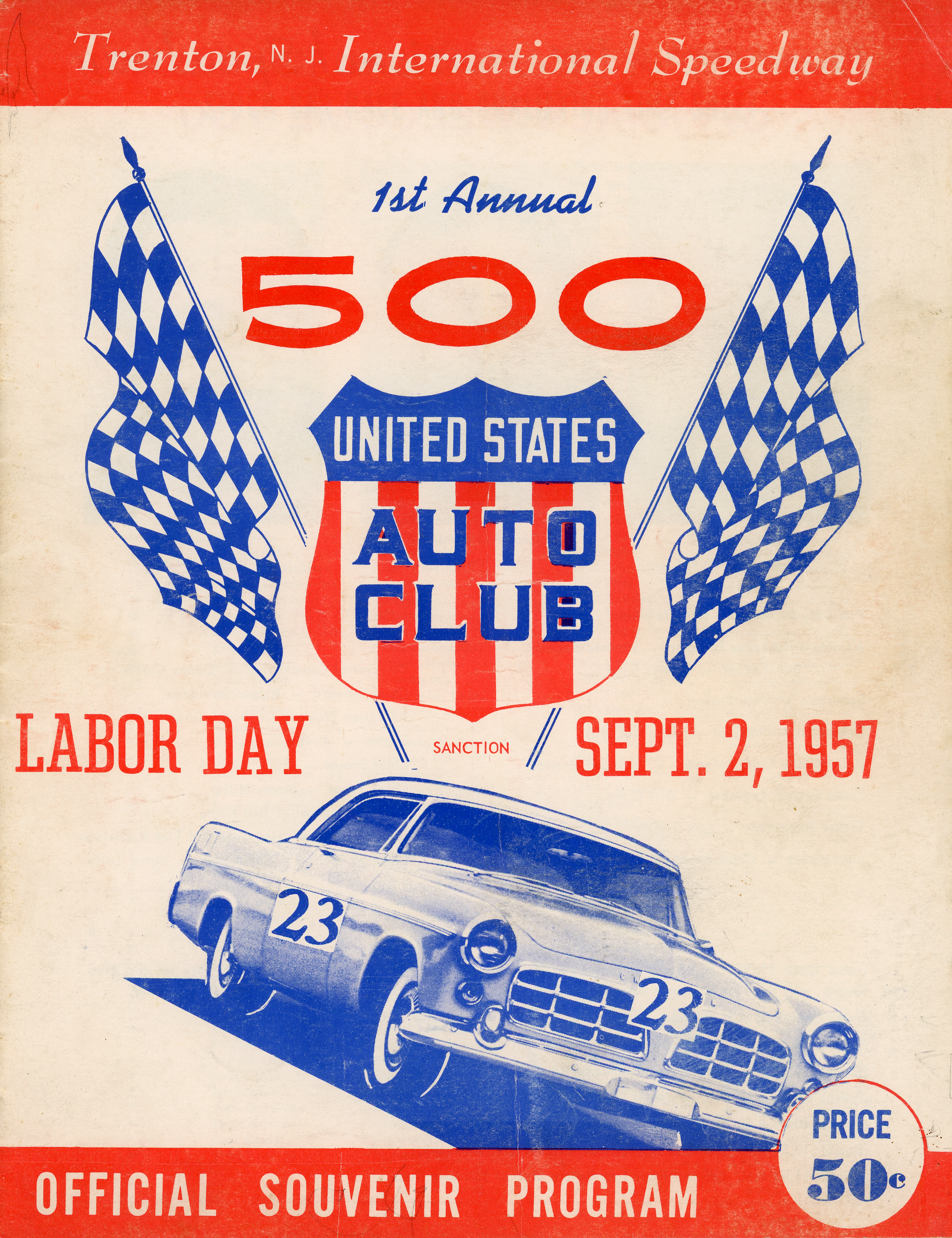
Klapak was the winner of the 1957 Trenton 500

Klapak began racing at the Sharon Speedway on the Pennsylvania-Ohio border in 1931, and by 1950 regularly competing with NASCAR, where he won the first of three consecutive NASCAR Sportsman Division (predecessor of currently O'Reilly Auto Parts Series) titles in 1950, 1951 and 1952. He also entered 13 events in the Grand National Division (now NASCAR Cup), including multiple times at Florida's Daytona Beach Road Course.

Klapak spent much of his career in the Midwest Association for Race Cars, now ARCA, where he won two more titles. He also often raced in USAC.

Klapak was the 2009 pioneer selection for the Northeast Dirt Modified Hall of Fame.

== Motorsports career results ==
=== NASCAR ===
(key) (Bold – Pole position awarded by qualifying time. Italics – Pole position earned by points standings or practice time. * – Most laps led.)

==== Grand National Series ====
NASCAR Grand National Series results
Year	Team	No.	Make	1	2	3	4	5	6	7	8	9	10	11	12	13	14	15	16	17	18	19	20	21	22	23	24	25	26	27	28	29	30	31	32	33	34	35	36	37	38	39	40	41	NGNC	Pts	Ref
1950	Mike Klapak	23	Ford	DAB	CLT	LAN	MAR	CAN; 14	VER					DSP; 25	HAM	DAR	LAN; 40	NWS	VER	MAR	WIN	HBO																							98th	-	
1950	Mike Klapak	23	Nash							DSP; 15	MCF	CLT	HBO																																98th	-	
1951	Perry Smith	23	Studebaker	DAB; 42	CLT	NMO	GAR	HBO	ASF	NWS	MAR																																		–	–	
1951	John Marcum	77	Nash									CAN; 8	CLS	CLB																															–	–	
1951	Mike Klapak	35	Nash												DSP; 26	GAR	GRS; 24	BAI; 26	HEI; 42	AWS	MCF	ALS	MSF	FMS	MOR	ABS	DAR	CLB	CCS	LAN	CLT	DSP	WIL	HBO	TPN	PGS	MAR	OAK	NWS	HMS	JSP	ATL	GAR	NMO	–	–	
1952	Marshall Teague	4	Hudson	PBS	DAB; 47	JSP	NWS	MAR	CLB	ATL	CCS	LAN	DAR	DSP	CAN	HAY	FMS	HBO	CLT	MSF	NIF	OSW	MON	MOR	PPS	MCF	AWS	DAR	CCS	LAN	DSP	WIL	HBO	MAR	NWS	ATL	PBS								199th	-	
1953	Bill Adams	18	Olds	PBS	DAB	HAR; 6	NWS	CLT; 8	RCH	CCS	LAN	CLB	HCY	MAR	PMS	RSP	LOU	FIF	LAN	TCS	WIL	MCF	PIF	MOR	ATL	RVS	LCF	DAV	HBO	AWS	PAS	HCY	DAR	CCS	LAN	BLF	WIL	NWS	MAR	ATL					-	-	
