= Don Williams (racing driver) =

- Born: Gordon Lee Williams, Jr. May 14, 1947; Madison, Florida, U.S.
- Died: May 21, 1989 (aged 42); Perry, Florida, U.S.
- Cause of death: Head injuries from racing accident

Gordon Lee "Don" Williams, Jr. (May 14, 1947 – May 21, 1989) was an American stock car driver born in Madison, Florida. He competed in the Sportsman 300 race at Daytona International Speedway on February 17, 1979, a Late Model Sportsman Division (now O'Reilly Auto Parts Series) race sanctioned by NASCAR. Williams was injured in a fiery multiple-car crash, and lived in a semicomatose state for ten years before his death.

== Crash ==
Williams was competing in the Late Model Sportsman race, the Permatex 300, at Daytona on February 17, 1979. The crash began when a car driven by Freddie Smith went into a spin and was struck by a car driven by Joe Frasson, which then burst into flames as he hit the wall. Frasson was then struck at full speed by Delma Cowart. Williams was behind Cowart and tried to avoid the pileup. His No. 68 Chevrolet Chevelle crashed into the wall and spun onto the infield amid a shower of flying debris. Williams suffered head and chest injuries as well as a fractured right arm and an aneurysm in the right eye.

== See also ==
- List of Daytona International Speedway fatalities
- List of NASCAR fatal accidents
- Driver deaths in motorsport
