= Stafford Motor Speedway =

Racetrack

Stafford Speedway
Stafford
- Location: Stafford Springs, Connecticut
- Coordinates: 41°57′19.08″N 72°19′13.44″W
- Capacity: 10,000
- Operator: Mark Arute
- Broke ground: 1868
- Opened: 1870
- Former names: Stafford Motor Speedway (1979–2022); Stafford Springs Motor Speedway (1959–1978); Stafford Springs Speedway (1946–1958); Stafford Springs Agricultural Park (1870–1945)
- Major events: Current: NASCAR Whelen Modified Tour (1985–1987, 1989–2021, 2026); Formula D (2026); Former: Camping World SRX Tour (2021–2023); NASCAR K&N Pro Series East; Stafford 150 (1987, 1991, 1993–2008, 2016); NASCAR North Tour (1979–1982, 1985)

Oval
- Surface: Paved
- Length: 0.500 mi (0.805 km)
- Turns: 4
- Banking: Turns 1-2: 9° Turns 3-4: 7.5°

Stafford Speedway (formerly known as Stafford Motor Speedway and Stafford Springs Motor Speedway) is a 1/2 mi (0.80 km) paved oval located in Stafford Springs, Connecticut. Stafford Speedway holds weekly racing every Friday night May through September. This track is known as the home of the SK Modifieds and drivers such as Ryan Preece and Ted Christopher. The track hosts weekly events throughout the season previously including three NASCAR Whelen Modified Tour events yearly. Stafford Motor Speedway is the track that had hosted the second most ever races in the modern era of the NASCAR Whelen Modified Tour with 135 races from 1985 to 2021.

The speedway also had hosted five NASCAR North Tour events from 1979 until 1985 and 30 NASCAR K&N Pro Series East races, between 1987 and 2016.

Stafford Motor Speedway was the site of the first ever Superstar Racing Experience event on June 12, 2021. The main event was won by track regular Doug Coby.

In December 2020, the track announced that it would end its 60-year affiliation with NASCAR, "due to a conflict regarding ownership of streaming and broadcast rights of weekly racing events". Stafford began live streaming on FloRacing in 2021.

== History ==
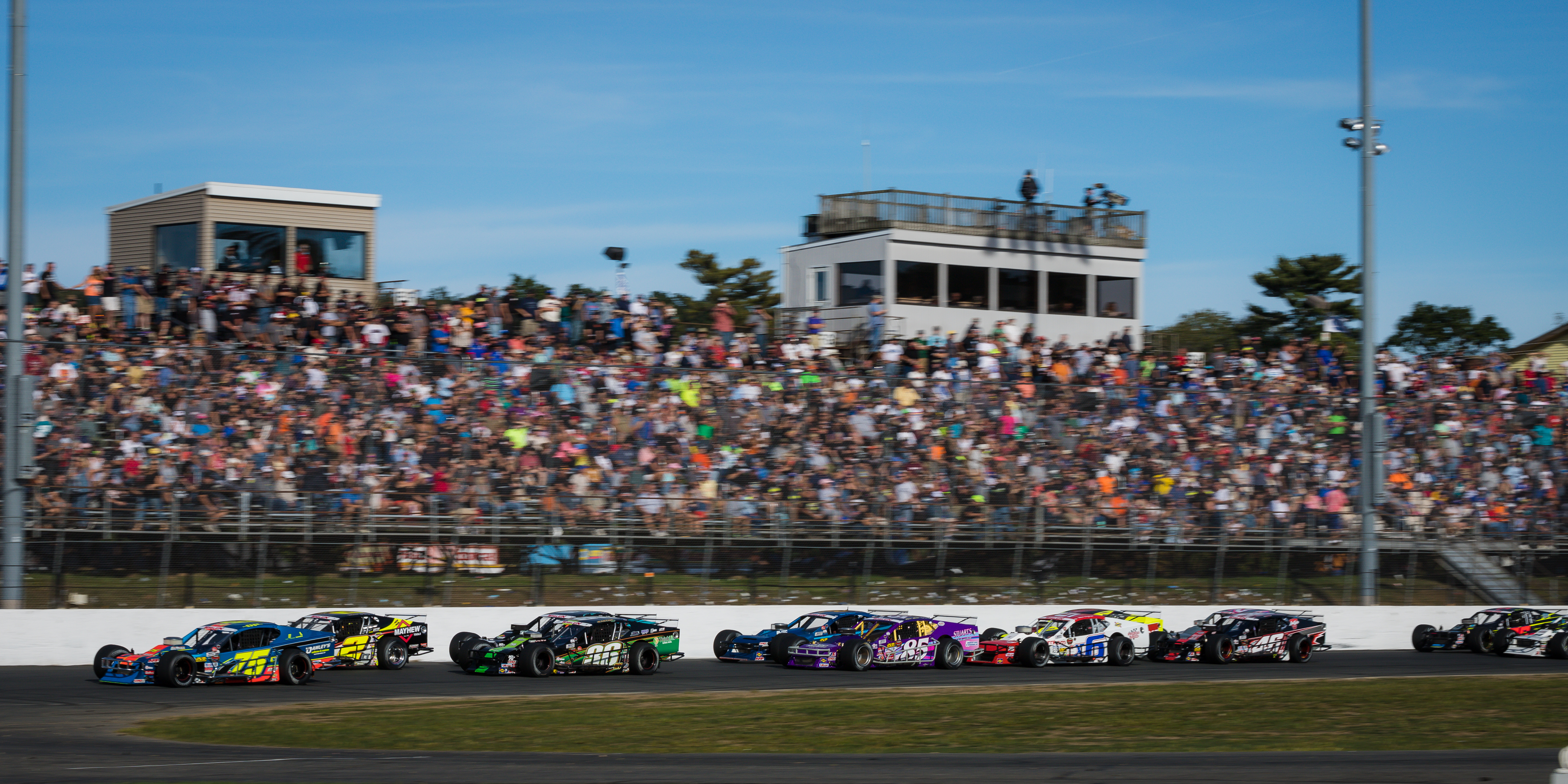
Start of the 2019 Fall Final 150

Originally known as the Stafford Springs Agricultural Park, the facility was used as a half-mile horse racing facility up to the end of World War II when it switched to automobile racing. The facility became a NASCAR track in 1959 as a dirt track, under the ownership of Rockville auto dealer Mal Barlow, Barlow paved the track in 1967. It was purchased by the Arute brothers, Chuck and Jack Arute in 1970. Jack's son Mark Arute continues to own and manage the track with his wife Lisa, and two sons Paul and David.

== Notable drivers ==
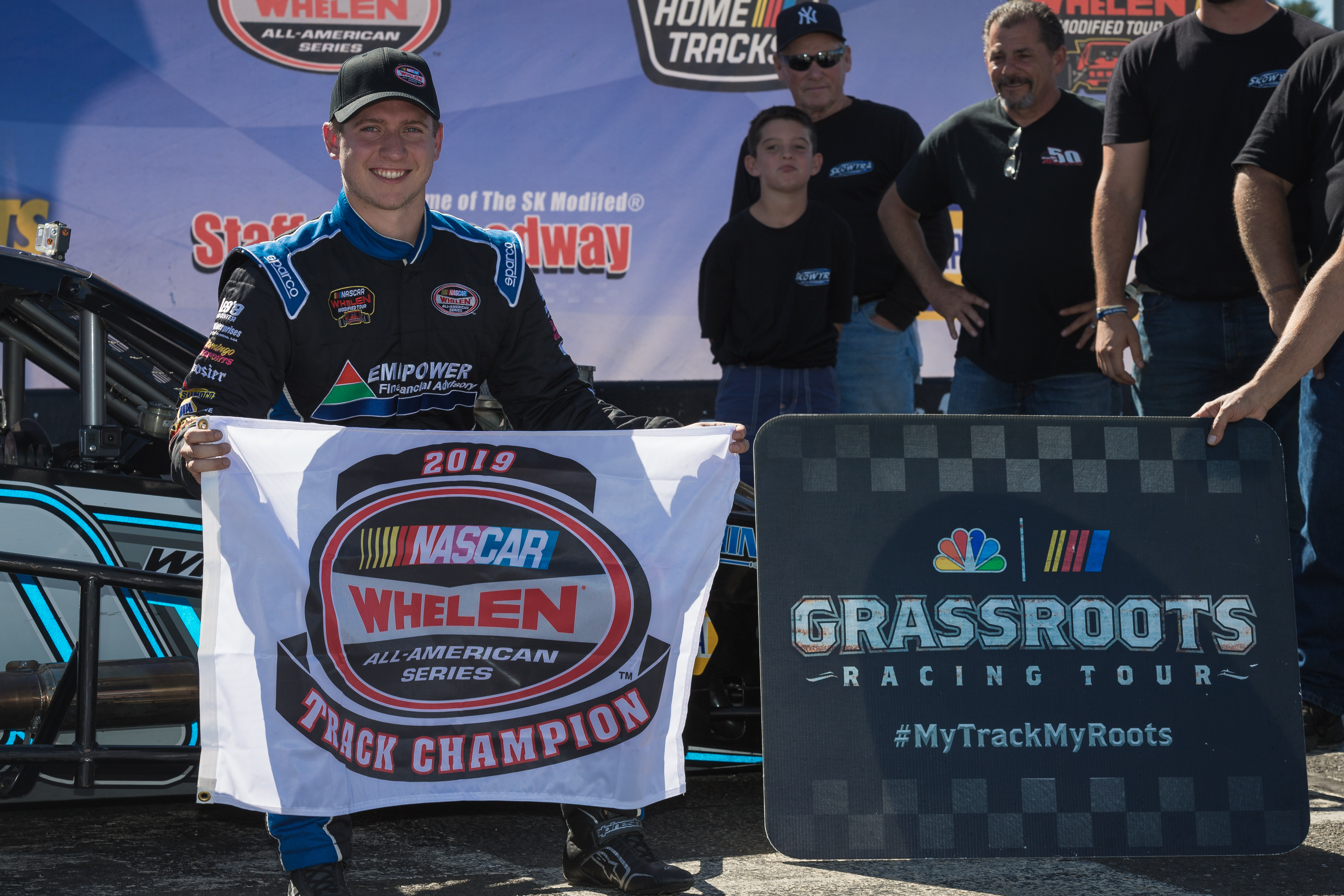

- Geoff Bodine
- Brett Bodine
- Ron Bouchard
- Ken Bouchard
- Greg Sacks
- Doug Coby
- Jerry Cook
- Dale Earnhardt
- Richie Evans
- Jimmy Spencer
- Mike Stefanik
- Ted Christopher
- Don McTavish
- Ryan Preece
- Donny Travaglin
- Martin Truex Jr.
- Steve Park
