= Brawner =

Brawner is a surname. Notable people with the surname include:

- Bonnie Brawner (born 1988), American Paralympic volleyball player, and teacher
- Bridgette Brawner, American nursing researcher and professor
- Clara Brawner (August 29, 1929 – October 4, 1991), the only African-American woman physician in Memphis, Tennessee
- Djay Brawner (born 1981), American music video, film and television director
- Greta Brawner, American television anchor
- Joe Brawner, American basketball player
- Robert Brawner (1929–2022), American swimmer
- The Brawner family of the Philippines:
  - Felix Brawner Jr. (1934–2022), commander in Armed Forces of the Philippines
  - Romeo Brawner Sr. (1935–2008), Filipino public official
  - Romeo Brawner Jr. (born 1968), Filipino military general
  - Teodoro Brawner Baguilat Jr. (born 1966), Filipino politician, journalist and activist
