= Langhorne Speedway =

American auto racing venue

"The 'Horne" "The Big Left Turn" "The Track That Ate the Heroes" "Puke Hollow" (Turn No. 2)

- Langhorne Speedway (1965–1970)

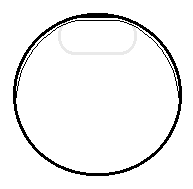
- Langhorne Speedway (1926–1964)
- Location: Middletown Township, Bucks County, near Langhorne, Pennsylvania
- Coordinates: 40°10′42″N 74°53′05″W
- Capacity: Approximately 60,000
- Owner: National Motor Racing Association (1926–1929); Ralph "Pappy" Hankinson (1930–1941); Earl "Lucky" Teter (1941–1942); John Babcock (1946–1950); Irv Fried and Al Gerber (1951–1971)
- Operator: Langhorne Speedway
- Opened: June 12, 1926; 100 years ago
- Closed: October 17, 1971; 55 years ago
- Former names: New Philadelphia/Philadelphia Speedway (1926–c.1930)
- Major events: AAA Championship Car; Langhorne 100 (1930–1955); USAC Championship Car; Langhorne 100 (1956-1970); NASCAR Grand National Series (1949–1957); NASCAR Convertible Division (1956–1957); Langhorne National Open (1951–1971)

Circle
- Length: 0.99 mi (1.6 km)
- Banking: Minimal

Pennsylvania Historical Marker
- Designated: 2006

Langhorne Speedway was an automobile racetrack in Middletown Township, Bucks County, near the borough of Langhorne, Pennsylvania, a northern suburb of Philadelphia.

According to the book Langhorne! No Man's Land by L. Spencer Riggs: "With all other courses up to that time being fairground horse tracks, Langhorne was the first [one-]mile dirt track built specifically for cars". High-profile American racing clubs like the American Motorcyclist Association (AMA), American Automobile Association (AAA), and United States Auto Club (USAC) made Langhorne one of the stops on their national circuits. These events included AMA-sanctioned National Championship Motorcycle races between 1935 and 1956, AAA-sanctioned Championship Car races between 1930 and 1955, and USAC-sanctioned Championship Car races from 1956 to 1970. The USAC races featured (and were won by) notable racers such as A. J. Foyt, Mario Andretti, Al Unser, Bobby Unser, Gordon Johncock, Lloyd Ruby, and Eddie Sachs. Langhorne was also featured prominently in NASCAR's early years, and hosted at least one NASCAR-sanctioned race every year from 1949 to 1957.

== Track history ==
The speedway was built by a group of Philadelphia racing enthusiasts known as the National Motor Racing Association (NMRA) and the first race was held on June 12, 1926 (scheduled for May 31 but postponed by rain). Freddie Winnai of Philadelphia qualified in 42.40 seconds, a new world record for a one-mile (1.6 km) track, and went on to win the 50-lap main event.

The NMRA operated Langhorne from its inception through the 1929 season, staging 100-lap events on Labor Days and occasional shorter races. Difficulties in track preparation, management disputes, and poor attendance drove the speedway to the brink of bankruptcy until noted promoter Ralph "Pappy" Hankinson took over in 1930. Hankinson brought in AAA Championship 100-lap races and continued to stage shorter sprint car racing events on the circular track. One of the first stock car races in the northeastern U.S. was held at Langhorne in 1940; Roy Hall of Atlanta, Georgia, was the victor in the 200-lap event.

In 1941, Hankinson sold the track to stuntman Earl "Lucky" Teter after a falling out with the AAA. However, Teter's tenure only lasted until July 5, 1942, when he was killed while attempting his rocket car leap stunt at the Indiana State Fairgrounds. That same month, the U.S. government banned all forms of auto racing due to America's involvement in World War II. As a result, the speedway sat idle and did not host a race of any kind until 1946. Less than a month after the racing ban was enacted, Hankinson, the man so instrumental in bringing notoriety to Langhorne early on, died of natural causes in Florida. With a huge void created in the track's management, ownership of Langhorne Speedway was passed on to John Babcock and his family. Then in 1951, Irv Fried and Al Gerber became promoters.

Catering chiefly to USAC's Championship Car Division, Fried and Gerber had the track's layout reconfigured to a D shape in 1965 by building a straightaway across the back stretch and paving over the uneven dirt surface with asphalt. However, as suburban growth engulfed the speedway with Levittown being built up around the area, the offers from developers became too tempting to refuse. Fried and Gerber announced the sale of the property to mall developers in 1967, but the speedway held on through five more seasons. The final race held at Langhorne occurred on October 17, 1971, with Roger Treichler claiming the win at the national open for modified stock cars.

=== Site after closure ===
The landscape of the once-famous racetrack was dramatically altered after that last race over 50 years ago. Almost immediately after Langhorne's closure, the property was razed in order to make way for a new shopping development. The current space features a Sam's Club, a Restaurant Depot warehouse and a CarMax dealership where the pits and grandstand were once located. A heavily overgrown wooded area has completely enveloped the infield and backstretch, while a self storage facility (formerly Aldi) and asphalt parking lots around the perimeter of the site cover up the rest. As a result, no physical remnants of the track itself remain.

On Saturday, October 14, 2006, almost 35 years to the day of the last race held at Langhorne, the Pennsylvania Historical and Museum Commission dedicated a historical marker at 1939 E. Lincoln Highway (in the same general area where the track was located) which reads:

Opened in 1926, this circular one-mile dirt track was known as the "Big Left Turn". It hosted a NASCAR inaugural race in 1949. Notable drivers Doc Mackenzie, Joie Chitwood, Rex Mays, Lee Petty, Dutch Hoag, A.J. Foyt, and Mario Andretti raced here in stock, midget, sprint, and Indy cars. Langhorne was reshaped as a D and paved in 1965. The National Open Championship run here was regarded as the "Indy of the East". The final race was held in 1971.

Langhorne was relocated to southern New Jersey and became Bridgeport Speedway in Bridgeport, New Jersey.

=== Deaths and serious injuries ===
The track became known as one of the more dangerous tracks in motorsports. 18 drivers, five motorcycle riders, three spectators, and one flagman have died at the track. Larry Mann, Frank Arford, Bobby Marvin, John McVitty, Joe Russo, Mike Nazaruk, and Jimmy Bryan were all killed racing at this track. In the first national open, in 1951, a large wreck blocked the track and burned driver Wally Campbell, that year's NASCAR National Modified champion. Several other noted drivers were injured in accidents, often described as spectacular, due to high speeds on the mile-long but rough dirt surface.

In 1965, one of the most spectacular comebacks in auto racing history began with the serious burns and injuries to Mel Kenyon. Kenyon later returned to racing and placed third at the Indy 500 and won numerous national midget racing championships.

=== "Puke Hollow" ===
Probably the most notorious area of the original dirt race course, which earned the nickname "Puke Hollow", was located at turn two. It received this moniker due to the fact that a driver might be inclined to "puke" as a result of the extreme jostling his car would experience when hitting the deep ruts which formed in this section of the track as a race progressed. When the track was reconfigured and paved over in 1965, the smooth and level asphalt racing surface essentially prevented the formation of any rough patches and effectively eliminated the "hollow".

Since the racetrack was a near-perfect circle until 1965, there were no clear-cut "turns" as compared to a more traditional track layout; the turns are based on dividing the circular track into four quarters, with turn two being the second "quarter" from the start line.

== Race history ==
=== Langhorne in NASCAR's pioneering years ===
The Speedway hosted the nation's most noted race for the Modified division; the first post-war stock car race run at the facility was a National Championship Stock Car Circuit (a forerunner to NASCAR) race in 1947, with Bob Flock taking home the checkered flag. In September 1949, Langhorne hosted the fourth race of NASCAR's first year of sanctioning unmodified cars, then called Strictly Stock; Curtis Turner won that race. The Strictly Stock series was renamed the Grand National series for the 1950 season, and the series is now known as NASCAR Cup Series. Langhorne continued to host an annual stop on the Grand National schedule from 1950 to 1957. Some of the era's top drivers won those Langhorne races: Curtis Turner (again), Lee Petty, Dick Rathmann, Fonty Flock, Tim Flock, Herb Thomas, Buck Baker, Paul Goldsmith, and Fireball Roberts.

==== NASCAR Grand National winners ====
All winners were (United States) American

Season	Date	Winning driver	Manufacturer
1949	September 11	Curtis Turner	Oldsmobile
1950	April 16	Curtis Turner	Oldsmobile
1950	September 17	Fonty Flock	Oldsmobile
1951	September 15	Herb Thomas	Hudson
1952	May 4	Dick Rathmann	Hudson
1952	September 14	Lee Petty	Plymouth
1953	May 3	Buck Baker	Oldsmobile
1953	June 21	Dick Rathmann	Hudson
1953	September 20	Dick Rathmann	Hudson
1954	May 2	Herb Thomas	Hudson
1954	September 26	Herb Thomas	Hudson
1955	April 24	Tim Flock	Chrysler
1955	September 18	Tim Flock	Chrysler
1956	April 22	Buck Baker	Chrysler
1956	September 23	Paul Goldsmith	Chevrolet
1957	April 14	Fireball Roberts	Ford
1957	September 15	Gwyn Staley	Chevrolet

=== Langhorne National Open ===
From 1951 to 1971, Langhorne Speedway hosted the Langhorne National Open, which became the nation's most prestigious race for Sportsman and Modified cars. Guaranteed starting positions were awarded to the winners (or highest finishers not already qualified) at special Langhorne Qualifier races held at weekly racetracks throughout the Northeast and Southeast. It was common to have over a hundred cars attempt to qualify for the National Open. From 1951 to 1957, the race was sanctioned by NASCAR. In 1961 and 1962, Supermodifieds raced with the Modifieds and Sportsman cars. Dutch Hoag was the most successful driver, winning five times. Hoag was the only driver to win the National Open on both the dirt and pavement surfaces.

The race continues to this day. In 1972, organisers changed the name to the Race of Champions, which has been raced exclusively on pavement for Modifieds at various Northeastern tracks, and its history has been combined into the National Open. Pavement Modified star Matt Hirschman is the official record holder of this race, having won nine times, three at Oswego Speedway, four at Lake Erie Speedway, and once each at Lancaster Speedway and Chemung Speedrome.

==== Langhorne National Open winners ====
All winners were (United States) American

Season	Date	Winning driver	Home State
1951	October 14	Hully Bunn (relief driver: Dick Eagan)	Connecticut
1952	October 12	Jim Delaney	New Jersey
1953	October 11	Ted Swaim	North Carolina
1954	October 10	Frankie Schneider	New Jersey
1955	October 9	Pete Corey	New York
1956	October 14	Dutch Hoag	New York
1957	October 13	Glenn Guthrie	District of Columbia
1958	October 12	Jim Delaney	New Jersey
1959	October 11	Jim Delaney	New Jersey
1960	October 9	Dutch Hoag	New York
1961	October 8	Bobby Malzahn	Florida
1962	October 14	Frankie Schneider	New Jersey
1963	October 13	Dutch Hoag	New York
1964	October 11	Freddy Adam	Pennsylvania
1965	October 10	Bill Slater	Connecticut
1966	October 9	Will Cagle	Florida
1967	October 8	Dutch Hoag	New York
1968	October 13	Dutch Hoag	New York
1969	October 12	Ray Hendrick	Virginia
1970	October 11	Merv Treichler	New York
1971	October 17(*)	Roger Treichler	New York

(*) = Last race ever held at Langhorne Speedway. See Race of Champions for a history of this race since 1972.

=== AAA Champ Car winners ===
All winners were (United States) American

Season	Date	Winning driver	Chassis	Engine
1930	May 3	Bill Cummings	Miller	Miller
1935	October 13	Kelly Petillo	Wetteroth	Offy
1940	June 16	Duke Nalon	Adams	Sparks
1941	June 22	Duke Nalon	Adams	Sparks
1946	June 30	Rex Mays	Stevens	Winfield
1947	June 22	Bill Holland	Wetteroth	Offy
1948	June 20	Walt Brown	Kurtis Kraft	Offy
1949	October 16	Johnnie Parsons	Kurtis Kraft	Offy
1950	June 25	Jack McGrath	Kurtis Kraft	Offy
1951	June 24	Tony Bettenhausen	Kurtis Kraft	Offy
1954	June 20	Jimmy Bryan	Kuzma	Offy
1955	June 19	Jimmy Bryan	Kuzma	Offy

=== USAC Champ Car winners ===
All winners were (United States) American

Season	Date	Winning driver	Chassis	Engine
1956	June 24	George Amick	Kuzma	Offy
1957	June 7	Johnny Thomson	Kuzma	Offy
1958	June 15	Eddie Sachs	Kuzma	Offy
1959	June 14	Van Johnson	Kurtis Kraft	Offy
1960	June 19	Jim Hurtubise	Kuzma	Offy
1961	June 18	A. J. Foyt	Meskowski	Offy
1962	July 1	A. J. Foyt	Meskowski	Offy
1962	August 26	Don Branson	Watson	Offy
1963	June 23	A. J. Foyt	Meskowski	Offy
1964	June 21	A. J. Foyt	Meskowski	Offy
1965	June 20	Jim McElreath	Brabham	Offy
1965	August 8	Jim McElreath	Brabham	Offy
1966	June 12	Mario Andretti	Brawner Hawk	Ford
1966	August 7	Roger McCluskey	Eagle	Ford
1967	June 18	Lloyd Ruby	Mongoose	Ford
1967	July 30	Mario Andretti	Brawner Hawk	Ford
1968	June 23	Gordon Johncock	Gerhardt	Offy
1968	July 28	Al Unser	Lola	Ford
1969	June 15	Bobby Unser	Eagle	Offy
1970	June 14	Bobby Unser	Eagle	Offy

=== AMA 100 Mile National Speedway winners ===
Season	Winning rider	Make
1935	Woodsie Castonguay	Indian
1936	J. Lester Hillbish	Indian
1937	Ed Kretz	Indian
1938	Ed Kretz	Indian
1939	Robert Sparks	Norton
1940	Ed Kretz	Indian
1941	Tommy Hays	Harley-Davidson
1946	Johnny Spiegelhoff	Indian
1947	Ed Guill	Norton
1948	Ed Kretz	Indian
1949	Jimmy Chann	Harley-Davidson
1950	Billy Huber	Harley-Davidson
1951	Billy Huber	Harley-Davidson
1952	Rick Fisher	Triumph
1953	Paul Goldsmith	Harley-Davidson
1954	Everett Brashear	Harley-Davidson
1955	Brad Andres	Harley-Davidson
1956	Everett Brashear	Harley-Davidson

References: American Motorcycle Association Archives; Jack Vanino, motorcycle historian
