= List of NASCAR drivers who died during their careers =

Active NASCAR drivers that died

This is a list of NASCAR drivers who died during their careers. This list only includes active drivers who died due to circumstances outside of a NASCAR race, and includes full-time, part-time, suspended, or partially-retired drivers. For the list of drivers who died in NASCAR races, see the list of NASCAR fatalities. This list includes drivers of the touring series of NASCAR: NASCAR Cup Series, NASCAR O'Reilly Auto Parts Series, NASCAR Truck Series, NASCAR Modified Tour, NASCAR Mexico Series, NASCAR Advance Auto Parts Weekly Series, and the NASCAR-sanctioned ARCA Menards Series.

== Deaths of active drivers ==
This is a list of notable deaths in NASCAR and untimely deaths of professional NASCAR drivers.

†	Elected to the NASCAR Hall of Fame

Driver	Age	Team	Primary Series	Cause of death	Year	Ref(s)
Davey Allison^{†}	32	Robert Yates Racing	Cup	helicopter crash	1993	
Greg Biffle	55	SPS Racing/NY Racing Team	ARCA/Cup	plane crash	2025	
Charlie Bradberry	24	free agent	Busch	truck crash	2006	
Kyle Busch	41	Richard Childress Racing	Cup	pneumonia/sepsis	2026	
Ted Christopher	59	Danny Watts Racing	Modified tour	plane crash	2017	
Spencer Clark	19	Chris Diederich Racing	Busch	trailer crash	2006	
Jim V. Cook	28	free agent	Grand National	boating accident	1951	
Kevin Grubb	31	under suspension	Nationwide	suicide	2009	
Frederico Gutiérrez	17	Toughbuilt	Mexico	car crash	2023	
Bobby Hamilton	49	Bobby Hamilton Racing	Trucks	head and neck cancer	2007	
Matt Hawkins	21	Matt Hawkins Racing	ARCA	accidentally shot himself	2009	
Bobby Isaac^{†}	45	Neil Castles Racing	Cup	heat exhaustion	1977	
Nick Joanides	55	Performance P-1 Motorsports	ARCA	unknown	2025	
Andy Kirby	40	Jay Robinson Racing	Busch	motorcycle crash	2002	
Alan Kulwicki^{†}	38	AK Racing	Cup	plane crash	1993	
Jason Leffler	37	Humphrey Smith Racing	Cup	sprint car accident	2013	
Clarence Lovell	26	Don Bierschwale Racing	Cup	car crash	1973	
Dick J. Meyer	26	free agent	Grand National	car crash	1953	
Rob Moroso	22	Moroso Racing	Cup	car crash	1990	
Kimberly Myers	27	Kim Myers Racing	Weekly	cystic fibrosis	1997	
Richie Panch	31	free agent	Busch	plane crash	1985	
Tim Richmond	34	Hendrick Motorsports	Cup	HIV/AIDS	1989	
Marty Robbins	57	Robbins Racing	Cup	complications of heart surgery	1982	
Chris Trickle	25	Star Nursery Racing	Trucks/Southwest	homicide	1998	
