= Friday Hassler =

American NASCAR driver (1935-1972)

Raymond Hassler
- Hassler by his car
- Born: June 29, 1935; Chattanooga, Tennessee, U.S.
- Died: February 17, 1972 (aged 36); Daytona Beach, Florida, U.S.
- Cause of death: Racing accident

NASCAR Cup Series career
- 135 races run over 10 years
- Best finish: 16th (1971)
- First race: 1960 National 400 (Charlotte)
- Last race: 1972 Winston Western 500 (Riverside)
Wins	Top tens	Poles
0	48	2

Raymond Lee "Friday" Hassler (July 29, 1935 – February 17, 1972) was an American NASCAR Grand National and Winston Cup Series driver.

== Career ==
Hassler made his debut in 1960 but only drove a handful of races per year until 1967 when he drove 21 of the 49 races for Red Sharp and finished 32nd in points. He improved to 27th for Sharp the next year and drove his own car in 1969 to a 28th-place finish. In a late model car at the end of the year, he scored a win in the second annual Snowball Derby, now regarded as one of short track racing's most prestigious races. In 1970, he drove for James Hanley and finished 20th in points. His best season was 1971, when he drove his own car to 13 top-ten finishes and a 16th place points result.

At the 1971 Volunteer 500 at Bristol Motor Speedway, Hassler was a relief driver for race winner Charlie Glotzbach. It was not an official win for Hassler, and it is one of only three instances when two drivers drove the winning car in a NASCAR premier series race.

Hassler died of injuries sustained as a result of a 13 car-pileup during the first qualifying race of the 1972 Daytona 500 at the age of 36 and at the peak of his career. It happened on lap 19 when the No.57 Dodge of David Ray Boggs blew his right rear tire. Caught in the pileup, Hassler spun his No.39 Chevy into the infield grass before swerving back into the track and slammed into the outside wall head-on. His car rebounded and as it continued to spin out on the track, with other drivers still pilling into the crash scene, he was then broadsided on the passenger side door by the No.54 Dodge of Jimmy Crawford, the impact catapulting the car back into the wall. Hassler was killed instantly from massive head and neck injuries.

Hassler's wife Joannie was among the 40,000 spectators when the accident happened. One of his sons Jay now lives in the Hixson, Tennessee area, owning an equipment rental firm. He has run an occasional super late model race at Five Flags Speedway, where his father won the Snowball.

Hassler is prominently featured in the 1975 book The World's Number One, Flat-Out, All-Time Great Stock Car Racing Book by Jerry Bledsoe.

Achievements
Preceded by Wayne Niedecken, Sr.	Snowball Derby Winner; 1969	Succeeded by Wayne Niedecken, Sr.

Preceded by Talmadge Prince	NASCAR Cup Series fatal accidents 1972	Succeeded by Larry Smith
