= Charles Ogle (racing driver) =

American physician, businessman, and NASCAR driver killed during race testing session

- Born: September 7, 1941; Broken Arrow, Oklahoma, U.S.
- Died: December 26, 1985 (aged 44); Daytona Beach, Florida, U.S.
- Cause of death: Race car crash during testing at the Daytona International Speedway

Charles Allen Ogle (September 7, 1941 – December 26, 1985) was an American physician, businessman, and NASCAR driver who finished second in the 1985 Goody's Dash points standings. Ogle was killed at Daytona International Speedway while testing for the upcoming NASCAR season.

== Professional career ==
Ogle was born in Broken Arrow, Oklahoma on September 7, 1941. He became a captain in the Air Force Reserve and graduated from Oklahoma State Medical School. Ogle moved to Knoxville, Tennessee where his medical specialty involved setting up trauma clinics and emergency rooms. He also became a successful businessman owning over 120 Wendy's and D'Lites fast food restaurants throughout the southeast.

== NASCAR career ==
Ogle began his NASCAR career in the Goody's Dash Series in 1984 at the age of 42. He competed in six races in 1984 and ran full-time in 1985. In his second year, Ogle finished second three times and won his first race at the Southside Speedway in Richmond, Virginia, on September 6, 1985. He had seven top-five finishes and nine top-ten finishes on his way to second in the championship standings.

On the morning of December 15, 1985, Ogle was at Daytona International Speedway testing his Pontiac Sunbird in preparation for the upcoming season. The test session was only for Pontiac Goody's Dash cars and was scarcely attended. His D'Lites sponsored car apparently blew a tire at around 160 mph. The accident was not witnessed by anyone but an investigation reported his Pontiac "went sideways near the end of the Speedway backstretch, dug into the infield grass near the chicane and went airborne for about 100 feet. The 2,300 pound car, powered by a four cylinder engine, landed on its roof and slid through the chicane area before coming to a stop near an infield dirt embankment." Ogle received massive head injuries in the accident, apparently receiving brain stem damage and dragging his head on the ground as the car was sliding. He was initially in serious condition but two days later was downgraded to critical condition. His condition wavered between critical and serious condition before he died at 2:40 p.m. on December 26. Ogle became the 16th man killed at Daytona International Speedway. He was buried at Floral Haven Cemetery in Broken Arrow, Oklahoma.
