= Talmadge Prince =

American racing driver (1938-1970)

- Born: February 16, 1938; Cullman, Alabama, U.S.
- Died: February 19, 1970 (aged 32); Daytona Beach, Florida, U.S.
- Cause of death: Racing accident

NASCAR Cup Series career
- 1 race run over 1 year
- First race: 1970 Daytona 500 Qualifier 2 (Daytona)
Wins	Top tens	Poles
0	0	0

Talmadge "Tab" Prince (February 16, 1938 – February 19, 1970) was an American stock car racing driver.

== Early life ==
Prince was born February 16, 1938, in Cullman, Alabama. He was the fourth of six children born to William Taft Prince and Marie Cryer Prince. In 1969, he bought a 50% share of a Chrysler/Plymouth dealership in Dublin, Georgia. He financed the purchase using the proceeds from the sale of his business, PBR Electronics, to his older brother, William Lloyd Prince.

Prince was married twice. In 1959, he married Jeanette Ellen Looney. They had two children. He married his second wife, Nell Sutton, in 1968. They had one son who was born after his death.

== Racing career ==
Prince started racing cars in the early 1960s, racing sprint and Late Model Sportsman cars on short tracks in the American South. In 1970, he entered his first NASCAR Grand National Series event, the Daytona 500. Prince's career only lasted a very unfortunate 18 laps.

== Fatal accident ==
In the second of the two 125 mile qualifying races for the Daytona 500 he blew an engine on his Dodge Daytona and went into a slide. Bill Seifert, who was following behind Prince, got into oil, lost control, and broadsided onto the driver's side of Prince's car. Prince was killed instantly. He was buried at the Roselawn Cemetery in Decatur, Alabama, and was survived by two sons and a daughter. His crash was similar to Harold Kite's fatal crash in 1965.

== Motorsports career results ==
=== NASCAR ===
(key) (Bold - Pole position awarded by qualifying time. Italics - Pole position earned by points standings or practice time. * – Most laps led.)

==== Grand National Series ====
NASCAR Grand National Series results
Year	Team	No.	Make	1	2	3	4	5	6	7	8	9	10	11	12	13	14	15	16	17	18	19	20	21	22	23	24	25	26	27	28	29	30	31	32	33	34	35	36	37	38	39	40	41	42	43	44	45	46	47	48	NGNC	Pts
1970	Talmadge Prince	78	Dodge	RSD	DAY	DAY; 28	DAY; DNQ	RCH	CAR	SVH	ATL	BRI	TAL	NWS	CLB	DAR	BLV	LGY	CLT	SMR	MAR	MCH	RSD	HCY	KPT	GPS	DAY	AST	TPN	TRN	BRI	SMR	NSV	ATL	CLB	ONA	MCH	TAL	BGS	SBO	DAR	HCY	RCH	DOV	NCF	NWS	CLT	MAR	MGR	CAR	LGY	NA	0

Preceded by Billy Foster	NASCAR Cup Series fatal accidents 1970	Succeeded by Friday Hassler
