= Don MacTavish =

American racing driver (1940–1969)

- Born: August 22, 1940; Dover, Massachusetts, U.S.
- Died: February 22, 1969 (aged 28); Daytona Beach, Florida, U.S.
- Cause of death: Injuries from racing accident
- Achievements: 1966 NASCAR National Sportsman Series Champion
- Awards: 2001 New England Auto Racers Hall of Fame inductee

Donald Charles MacTavish (August 22, 1940 – February 22, 1969) was an American race car driver. He died in an accident at Daytona International Speedway.

== Biography ==
MacTavish was born in Dover, Massachusetts, and started his racing career at the age of 15 at the Norwood Arena in nearby Norwood. He quickly earned popularity for driving demolition derby cars, and appeared on ABC's Wide World of Sports. He competed in more than 100 Sportsman Car Series races on the East Coast. In 1963, he progressed to NASCAR's Sportsman Division and in 1966 he won the NASCAR National Sportsman Division Championship, a precursor to today's O'Reilly Auto Parts Series, by beating out Ralph Earnhardt among others.

In the late 1960s, MacTavish set his sights on competing in NASCAR's top series, the Grand National Series. On February 22, 1969, MacTavish made his debut at the Daytona International Speedway, driving the No. 5 1966 Mercury Comet in the NASCAR Sportsman Division's Permatex 300. On lap nine of the race, his vehicle tangled with a car driven by Bob James. Out of control, MacTavish's car hit the outside crash wall at a point where a metal guard rail covered an opening in the wall. The impact with the butt end of the concrete sheared off the whole front of the car, up to the firewall; the engine was thrown 100 feet (30 m) from the wreck. The Mercury then spun around and wound up facing oncoming cars in the middle of the track surface, with MacTavish completely exposed in the driver's seat. It was then struck by Sam Sommers, who was unable to see MacTavish's car due to smoke and flying debris from the accident. This second impact sent his car bouncing into the grass on the inside of the track. MacTavish died instantly.

Three months after his death, the first annual 100-lap "Don MacTavish Memorial Race" was organized at Albany-Saratoga Speedway. Race-winner Richie Evans was presented the winner's trophy by Mrs. Dorothy MacTavish and Miss Marcia MacTavish, mother and sister of the late driver for whom the event was named.

Each year, the American Canadian Tour racing series awards one driver with the prestigious MacTavish Award at their annual year-end Banquet of Champions. The award is given for outstanding contribution in the field of stock car racing and named in honor of MacTavish for his contributions to New England racing. Past recipients of the award have included Bill France Sr. (1969) and Ken Squier (1972).

In 2001, MacTavish was posthumously inducted into the New England Auto Racers Hall of Fame.

== See also ==
- List of NASCAR fatal accidents
- List of Daytona International Speedway fatalities
