= D'Lites =

American fast food chain

- Company type: private
- Industry: Fast food
- Founded: December 11, 1981; 44 years ago in Norcross, Georgia
- Founder: Doug Sheley, Jeffrey Miller
- Defunct: 1987; 39 years ago
- Fate: Chapter 11 bankruptcy
- Number of locations: 100+ at peak in 1985
- Area served: United States
- Products: Hamburgers, French fries, salad, frozen yogurt

D'Lites of America was an American fast food chain based in Norcross, Georgia. It was known for serving fast food with a higher emphasis on nutrition. It featured reduced-calorie dishes, including hamburgers made with lean beef, high-fiber buns, and low-calorie cheese.

Founders Doug Sheley and Jeffrey Miller opened the first D'Lites of America location in Atlanta, Georgia in December 1981, with the chain's first franchises opening in 1983. By 1985, more than 100 stores were in operation.

The chain stopped franchising in 1986 and closed several stores. By year's end, it had filed for Chapter 11 bankruptcy.

According to FIU Hospitality Review, the chain's closure was due to other chains such as McDonald's, Burger King, and Wendy's beginning to offer healthier sides such as salads and baked potatoes, as well as D'Lites' buying back of several unsuccessful franchise locations. Some former franchises, namely in New York, Illinois, and Virginia, continued to operate under the D'Lites name until early 1989.

== See also ==
- List of defunct fast-food restaurant chains
