= Bridgette Brawner =

Nurse researcher and equity advocate

Academic background
- Education: University of Pennsylvania School of Nursing
- Thesis: Depression and HIV risk -related sexual behaviors among African American adolescent females (2009)

Bridgette M. (Brawner) Rice is a nurse researcher and professor at Villanova University's M. Louise Fitzpatrick College of Nursing where she is the Richard and Marianne Kreider Endowed Professor in Nursing for Vulnerable Populations. She is known for her work on interventions to promote health equity in marginalized populations, with particular emphasis on HIV/STI prevention, mental health promotion, and mitigating negative neighborhood-level influences on health and well-being.

== Education and career ==
Brawner received her BSN from Villanova University in 2003. She went on to the University of Pennsylvania School of Nursing where she received an MSN in 2005 and a PhD in nursing in 2009. She received an MDiv from the Palmer Theological Seminary of Eastern University in 2017.

Brawner served as instructor, assistant professor and ultimately tenured associate professor at the University of Pennsylvania's School of Nursing. In 2021, she moved to Villanova University and was named the Richard and Marianne Kreider Endowed Professor in Nursing for Vulnerable Populations in January 2022.

== Research ==
Her research utilizes novel mixed methods approaches, such as GIS mapping and community ethnography to address how social and structural factors shape health outcomes.

== Selected publications ==
- Brawner, B.M.; Gomes, M.M.; Jemmott, L.S.; Deatrick, J.A.; Coleman, C.L. (2012). "Clinical depression and HIV risk-related sexual behaviors among African-American adolescent females: Unmasking the numbers". AIDS Care. 24 (5): 618–625. doi:10.1080/09540121.2011.630344. ISSN 0954-0121. PMC 4266377. PMID 22292603.
- Brawner, B.M., Kerr, J., Castle, B.F. et al. "A Systematic Review of Neighborhood-Level Influences on HIV Vulnerability". AIDS Behav 26, 874–934 (2022). https://doi.org/10.1007/s10461-021-03448-w
- Brawner, Bridgette M.; Baker, Jillian Lucas; Stewart, Jennifer; Davis, Zupenda M.; Cederbaum, Julie; Jemmott, Loretta Sweet (2013). ""The Black Man's Country Club": Assessing the Feasibility of an HIV Risk-Reduction Program for Young Heterosexual African American Men in Barbershops". Family & Community Health. 36 (2): 109–118. doi:10.1097/FCH.0b013e318282b2b5. ISSN 0160-6379. PMC 3687538. PMID 23455681.
- Stevens, Robin; Gilliard-Matthews, Stacia; Dunaev, Jamie; Woods, Marcus K; Brawner, Bridgette M (2017). "The digital hood: Social media use among youth in disadvantaged neighborhoods". New Media & Society. 19 (6): 950–967. doi:10.1177/1461444815625941. ISSN 1461-4448. PMC 5501457. PMID 28694736.
- Opara, Ijeoma; Weissinger, Guy M.; Lardier, David T.; Lanier, Yzette; Carter, Sierra; Brawner, Bridgette M. (2021-03-04). "Mental health burden among Black adolescents: the need for better assessment, diagnosis and treatment engagement". Social Work in Mental Health. 19 (2): 88–104. doi:10.1080/15332985.2021.1879345. ISSN 1533-2985. PMC 8262091. PMID 34248423.

== Awards and honors ==
In 2015, Brawner received the Protégée Award from the Friends of the National Institute of Nursing Research. She received the International Society of Psychiatric-Mental Health Nurses Diversity and Equity Award in 2021.
