= Bruce Jacobi =

American racing driver (1935–1987)

- Born: Harold Bruce Jacobi; June 23, 1935; Salem, Indiana, U.S.
- Died: February 4, 1987 (aged 51); Indianapolis, Indiana, U.S.
- Cause of death: Head injuries from racing accident

NASCAR Cup Series career
- 20 races run over 6 years
- First race: 1975 Daytona 500 (Daytona)
- Last race: 1981 Mountain Dew 500 (Pocono)
Wins	Top tens	Poles
0	3	0

Harold Bruce Jacobi (June 23, 1935 – February 4, 1987) was an American race car driver. In 1987, Jacobi, 51, died of head injuries sustained in a NASCAR race crash at the Daytona International Speedway in 1983. He had 37 USAC Champ Car starts between 1960 and 1970, with a best finish of fourth at Springfield in 1970. Jacobi also completed rookie refresher testing in preparation for the 1967 Indianapolis 500, but did not attempt to qualify.

== Personal life ==
Jacobi married his wife Ya Da in 1969, and had three children.

== Daytona crash ==
Jacobi came into the 1983 Daytona Speedweeks without a ride, but picked one up with a smaller independent team owned by Bob Meazell by the time of the UNO Twin 125 qualifiers at Daytona International Speedway. During the first qualifying race on February 17, 1983, Jacobi lost control of his No. 05 Pontiac at the exit of turn two and flipped upon entering the grass infield, eventually coming to a stop near the inside dirt bank. He was taken from Daytona Speedway to Halifax Medical Center for treatment of a bruised brain stem and a severe injury to one of his eyes. Several days later, Jacobi was reported to be breathing with the assistance of a respirator, which by March 11, still at Halifax Medical Center, Jacobi no longer needed. He was flown from Florida to Indianapolis, and then transferred by ambulance to Hendricks County Hospital in Danville, Indiana for further treatment, on March 22.

=== Subsequent death ===
Jacobi remained in a comatose state for almost four years before dying at Methodist Hospital in Indianapolis.

Preceded by Ricky Knotts	NASCAR Sprint Cup Series fatal accidents 1983 (died in 1987)	Succeeded by Terry Schoonover
