= Meskowski =

Racing car constructor

- Industry: Racing

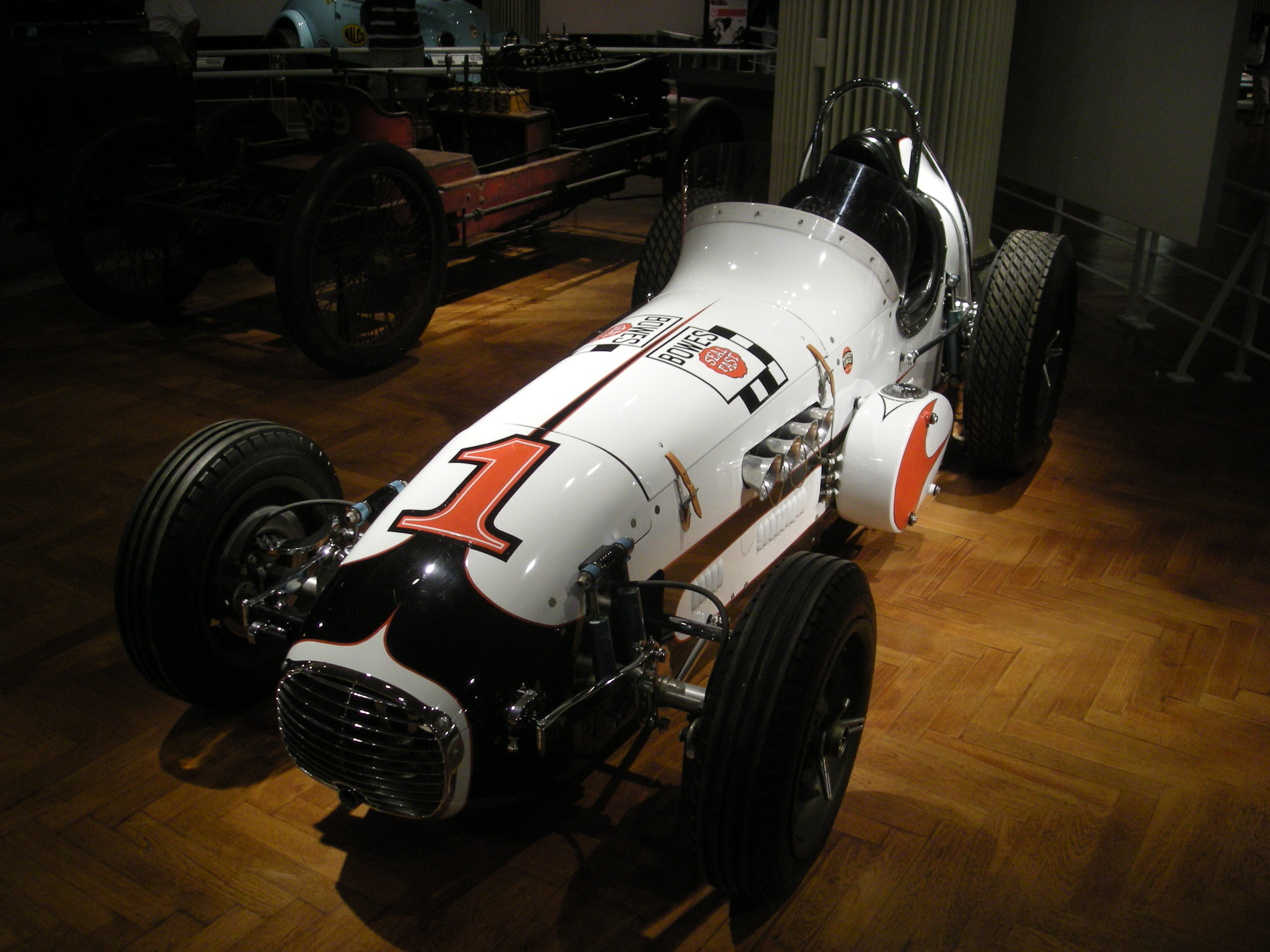
A 1960 Meskowski on display at the Henry Ford Museum in 2012.

Meskowski was a racing car constructor. Meskowski cars competed in one FIA World Championship race - the 1960 Indianapolis 500.

== World Championship Indy 500 results ==
| Season | Driver | Grid | Classification | Points | Note | Race Report |
|---|---|---|---|---|---|---|
| 1960 | Bob Veith | 25 | 8 | | | Report |
| 1960 | Bobby Grim | 21 | 16 | | | Report |
