= Ricky Knotts =

American racing driver

- Born: Benny Richard Knotts; May 23, 1951 Paw Paw, Michigan, U.S.
- Died: February 14, 1980 (aged 28) Daytona Beach, Florida, U.S.
- Years active: 1965–1980

Previous series
- 1979–1980 1965–1979: NASCAR Cup Series; American Speed Association

Championship titles
- 1979: Red Bud 300

Awards
- 2017: Michigan Motorsports Hall of Fame

Benny Richard Knotts (May 23, 1951 – February 14, 1980) was an American ASA driver. The Paw Paw, Michigan driver began his career in 1966 on Michigan short tracks and raced in various stock car series for six years before he died in a crash at Daytona International Speedway in 1980.

== ASA ==
Knotts was a Michigan short-track racer who began racing at the age of fourteen. Primarily competing in late models, he was in touring series by the late 1970s. He won three American Speed Association events during his career, at Toledo Speedway, Winchester Speedway, and Anderson Speedway. The 1979 Anderson win came in the Red Bud 300 in Anderson, now regarded as a major race for Super Late Model drivers, where he led 58 laps, beating Midwestern short track legends Dick Trickle and Mike Eddy (who led 57 laps), and future NASCAR Cup Series race winners Jody Ridley (who led 98 laps) and NASCAR Hall of Fame inductee Mark Martin (who led forty laps).

== Winston Cup Series ==
In 1979, the Knotts family purchased an Oldsmobile 442 race car, attempting to make Winston Cup Series starts without any prior ARCA or Sportsman experience on the longer circuits. The car made attempts at Michigan and Charlotte at the National 500, failing to qualify for both.

His father Richard served as his crew chief.

== Death ==
On February 14, 1980, Knotts was in the field for the second 125 mile heat race race at Daytona International Speedway, hoping to qualify for that Sunday's Daytona 500. His hopes dwindled as his Weaver powered Oldsmobile quickly lost position. On the fourteenth lap, Knotts hit the outside wall in the short chute just past the start finish line. His car spun off the track sideways across the infield grass and struck passenger side first against the inside concrete wall entering turn one. His seat mount broke and Knotts died instantly, aged 28.

Owing to his inexperience under their sanction, a NASCAR official admitted "there's just not much we can tell you about him. We just don't know much about him."

Knotts had never participated in an intermediate track with ARCA in the Midwest or in a Sportsman race such as the Permatex 300 at Daytona. He failed to qualify for two intermediate track races in 1979 at the Cup level.

Under current rules, Knotts would not have been permitted to participate in the Duels. NASCAR currently requires drivers to have intermediate experience before being allowed to participate in the three restrictor plate (superspeedway) races at Daytona, Talladega Superspeedway, and since 2022, Atlanta Motor Speedway. In addition, drivers cannot participate in the Daytona 500 heat races unless they have raced in any of the development series races previously at the three circuits. First time drivers must test in the January test session for ARCA and gain clearance from NASCAR before being permitted in a developmental series practice session (Truck, O'Reilly, ARCA) before being cleared to race in that series. Cup Series drivers must have participated in a superspeedway race in a lower series and start at another oval before being cleared for any of the six races at the classified superspeedways under current regulations. Under current rules, Knotts would have been told to participate in the ARCA race at Michigan before making an attempt at the Sportsman race in Charlotte in 1979 before the Daytona ARCA test, followed by the ARCA race at Daytona (the week before the 500) before he would have gained permission to race at Daytona in the Cup level.

== Honors ==
Knotts was inducted into the Michigan Motor Sports Hall of Fame in 2017. His daughter Toysa represented the family for the induction.

== Personal life ==
Knotts attended Comstock High School. He had a sister Deborah.

Knotts and his wife Connie had three children Jayson, Matthew, and Toysa.

== Motorsports career results ==
=== NASCAR ===
(key) (Bold - Pole position awarded by qualifying time. Italics - Pole position earned by points standings or practice time. * – Most laps led.)

==== Winston Cup Series ====
NASCAR Winston Cup Series results
Year	Team	No.	Make	1	2	3	4	5	6	7	8	9	10	11	12	13	14	15	16	17	18	19	20	21	22	23	24	25	26	27	28	29	30	31	NWCC	Pts	Ref
1979	Richard Knotts		Olds	RSD	DAY	CAR	RCH	ATL	NWS	BRI	DAR	MAR	TAL	NSV	DOV	CLT	TWS	RSD	MCH	DAY	NSV	POC	TAL	MCH; DNQ	BRI	DAR	RCH	DOV	MAR	CLT; DNQ	NWS	CAR	ATL	ONT	NA	-	
1980	Richard Knotts	31	Olds	RSD	DAY; DNQ	RCH	CAR	ATL	BRI	DAR	NWS	MAR	TAL	NSV	DOV	CLT	TWS	RSD	MCH	DAY	NSV	POC	TAL	MCH	BRI	DAR	RCH	DOV	NWS	MAR	CLT	CAR	ATL	ONT	NA	-	

Preceded by Tiny Lund	NASCAR Cup Series fatal accidents 1980	Succeeded by Bruce Jacobi
