= John McVitty =

American racing driver

- Born: December 26, 1926; Mamaroneck, New York, U.S.
- Died: April 21, 1956 (aged 29); Langhorne, Pennsylvania, U.S.
- Cause of death: Racing accident

NASCAR Cup Series career
- 11 races run over 2 years
- Best finish: 48th (1955)
- First race: 1955 untitled race (Fonda)
- Last race: 1956 Wilkes County 160 (North Wilkesboro)
Wins	Top tens	Poles
0	3	0

John Patrick McVitty (December 26, 1926 – April 21, 1956) was an American stock car racing driver who competed in the NASCAR Grand National Series. He was born in Mamaroneck, New York.

During his two-year NASCAR career, McVitty had raced in eleven races with three finished in the top ten and 1382 laps of experience – the equivalent of 786.8 miles (1,266.2 km). McVitty's total earning were considered to be $800 ($9,473.68 when adjusted for inflation). His average start was in 18th place and his average finish was in 15th place. All of McVitty's races were done in Chevrolet vehicles. At the 1956 Wilkes County 160, a fuel pump problem caused McVitty to retire from the race; he would be killed in a racing accident thirteen days later at Langhorne Speedway.

== Motorsports career results ==
=== NASCAR ===
(key) (Bold – Pole position awarded by qualifying time. Italics – Pole position earned by points standings or practice time. * – Most laps led.)

==== Grand National Series ====
NASCAR Grand National Series results
Year	Team	No.	Make	1	2	3	4	5	6	7	8	9	10	11	12	13	14	15	16	17	18	19	20	21	22	23	24	25	26	27	28	29	30	31	32	33	34	35	36	37	38	39	40	41	42	43	44	45	46	47	48	49	50	51	52	53	54	55	56	NGNC	Pts	Ref
1955	John McVitty	27	Chevy	TCS	PBS	JSP	DAB	OSP	CLB	HBO	NWS	MGY	LAN	CLT	HCY	ASF	TUS	MAR	RCH	NCF	FOR	LIN	MCF	FON; 8	AIR; 8	CLT	PIF	CLB	AWS	MOR	ALS	NYF; 20	SAN	CLT	FOR	MAS	RSP	DAR	MGY; 17	LAN	RSP; 13	GPS; 15	MAS	CLB	MAR	LVP	NWS; 17	HBO												48th	684	
1956	John McVitty	27	Chevy	HCY	CLT	WSS	PBS; 20	ASF	DAB	PBS; 10	WIL; 19	ATL	NWS; 20	LAN; Wth^{†}	RCH	CLB	CON	GPS	HCY	HBO	MAR	LIN	CLT	POR	EUR	NYF	MER	MAS	CLT	MCF	POR	AWS	RSP	PIF	CSF	CHI	CCF	MGY	OKL	ROA	OBS	SAN	NOR	PIF	MYB	POR	DAR	CSH	CLT	LAN	POR	CLB	HBO	NWP	CLT	CCF	MAR	HCY	WIL	116th	-	
^{†} – Fatal accident during qualifying
