= NASCAR Sportsman Division =

American car racing series

- Category: Stock car racing
- Country: United States, Canada
- Inaugural season: 1950
- Revised: 1968 (Late model)
- Final season: 1981
- Successor: NASCAR O'Reilly Auto Parts Series

The NASCAR Sportsman Division was formed in 1950, one year after the Strictly Stock (now NASCAR Cup Series) and was launched two years after NASCAR's formation. It gave NASCAR three major series, along with the original Modifieds. It was replaced with the Late Model Sportsman Series in 1968.

== Overview ==
As the post WWII auto industry began meeting demand for new cars, auto lots were filling up with the pre-war coupes and sedans. These 1939-1941 cars, "modified" with souped up engines, were finding their way to competitions at racing ovals converted from horse racing or newly carved out in fields. In 1948 NASCAR became one of the first organizations to standardize the rules to ensure equal competition.

The rulebook mandated that all cars had to be American made, and 1937 or newer, with full stock fenders, running boards and bodies if equipped by the factory, but their bumpers and mufflers had to be removed. Also, a car's wheelbase, length and width had to remain stock, as did the hood. Racers could use any radiator they wanted as long as it fit under the stock hood, which had to be secured with safety straps. Any interchangeable wheel or tire was allowed. In most cases, engines were limited to 300 cubic inches. Multiple carburetors were permitted, while overhead valves and superchargers were allowed only when factory optional or stock equipment. Oversized or extra oil and fuel tanks were allowed, but they had to be either concealed inside the car or under the hood. No foreign manufactured cars were permitted.

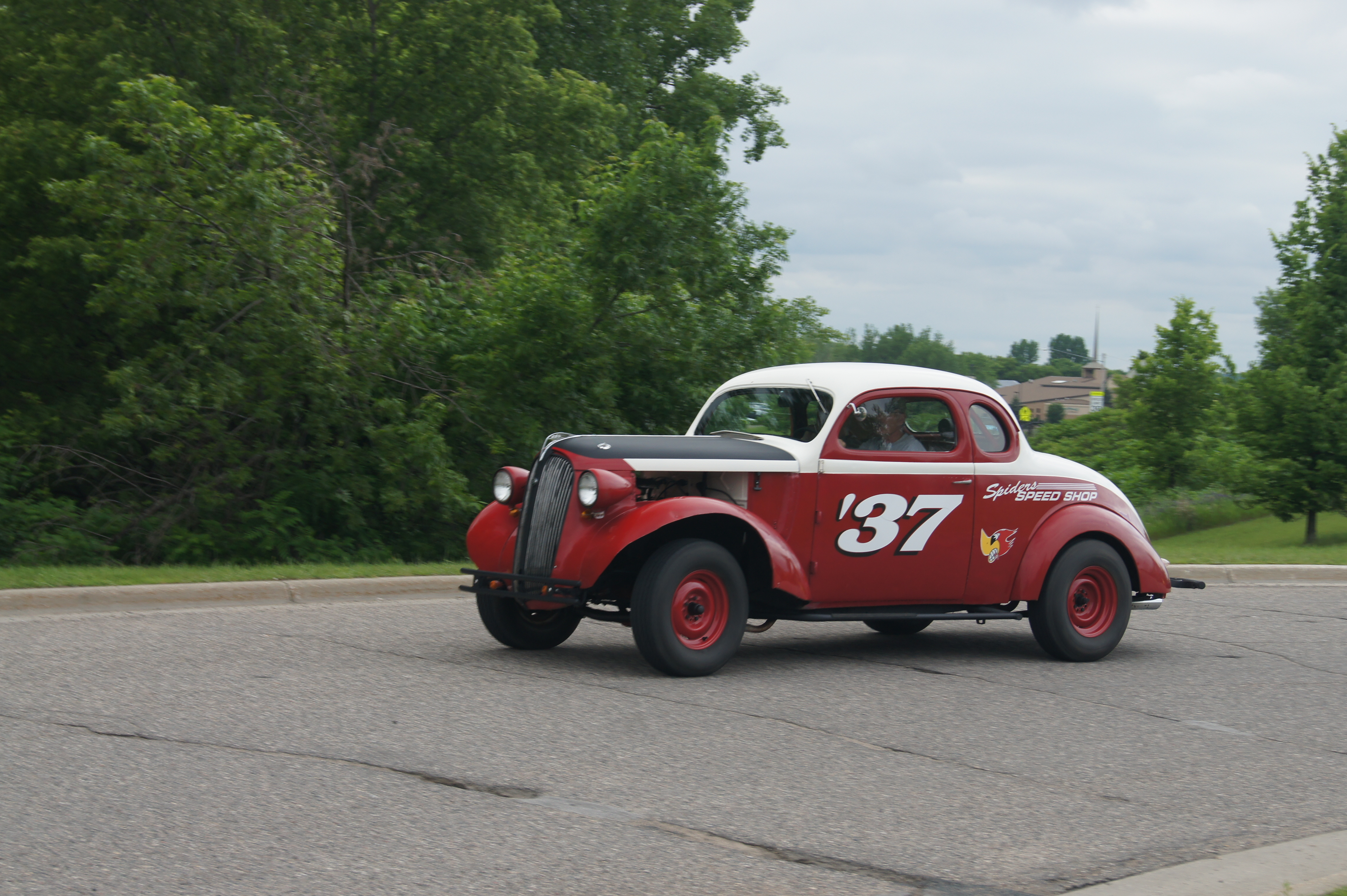
1937 Modified-Sportsman

When car owners expressed concerns over the rising cost of building a winning race car, NASCAR responded in 1950 by adding a division for "lesser modified" cars, which they distinguished as the Sportsman. Specifications for the Sportsman cars mirrored the Modified rules as to bodies and safety. Requirements for the Sportsman engines differed by restricting heads and intake manifolds to stock production, banning magnetos, and requiring a single carburetor and pump gasoline.

The norm for many NASCAR-sanctioned tracks was that Modifieds and Sportsmen raced side by side, but top-finishing Sportsmen received bonus money, and separate championship points were tallied for both divisions.

== Limited-Sportsman ==
As NASCAR’s Grand National cars aged out (current model year and two most recent years only) they became eligible to compete in the Sportsman division. As a result, the small block V8 engines introduced by the manufactures in the mid-1950s began dominating the Sportsman class, making the pre-war Ford flathead V8 and Chevrolet inline 6 cylinder obsolete. NASCAR responded by creating an additional "Limited-Sportsman" class in 1959 that provided drivers with the earlier production engines an opportunity to continue competing. NASCAR disbanded the series in 1963, but many race tracks continued to feature the limited-sportsman class for several more years.

== Late Model Sportsman ==
By 1967 the Sportsman specifications had evolved to include small block engines with a 335-cubic-inch limit, which could match speed with the Modifieds on many shorter tracks. Looking to differentiate the Sportsman as a truly separate class, and expecting spectators to relate better to newer model cars, NASCAR dropped the pre-war coupes and sedans for the 1968 season, substituting the Late Model Sportsman Series with 1955 and newer bodies. NASCAR later reorganized the championship points and events into the touring series that became the O'Reilly Auto Parts Series.

== NASCAR Igloo Sportsman Challenge ==
In 1989, Humpy Wheeler, the president of Charlotte Motor Speedway, announced the creation of a new Sportsman Division, a series in which drivers from short tracks could gain experience on superspeedways using former Cup or second-tier series cars. The series was disbanded after the 1996 season, with the graphic death of Russell Phillips the year prior being a catalyst in its demise.

== Sportsman Division - National Champions ==
Year	Champion	Year	Champion
1950	Mike Klapak	1959	Rick Henderson
1951	Mike Klapak	1960	Bill Wimble
1952	Mike Klapak	1961	Dick Nephew, Bill Wimble
1953	Johnny Roberts	1962	Rene Charland
1954	Danny L. Graves	1963	Rene Charland
1955	Billy Myers	1964	Rene Charland
1956	Ralph Earnhardt	1965	Rene Charland
1957	Ned Jarrett	1966	Don McTavish
1958	Ned Jarrett	1967	Pete Hamilton
Late Model Sportsman Division
Year	Champion	Year	Champion
1968	Joe Thurman	1975	L. D. Ottinger
1969	Red Farmer	1976	L. D. Ottinger
1970	Red Farmer	1977	Butch Lindley
1971	Red Farmer	1978	Butch Lindley
1972	Jack Ingram	1979	Gene Glover
1973	Jack Ingram	1980	Morgan Shepherd
1974	Jack Ingram	1981	Tommy Ellis
