= Habe Haberling =

American racing driver

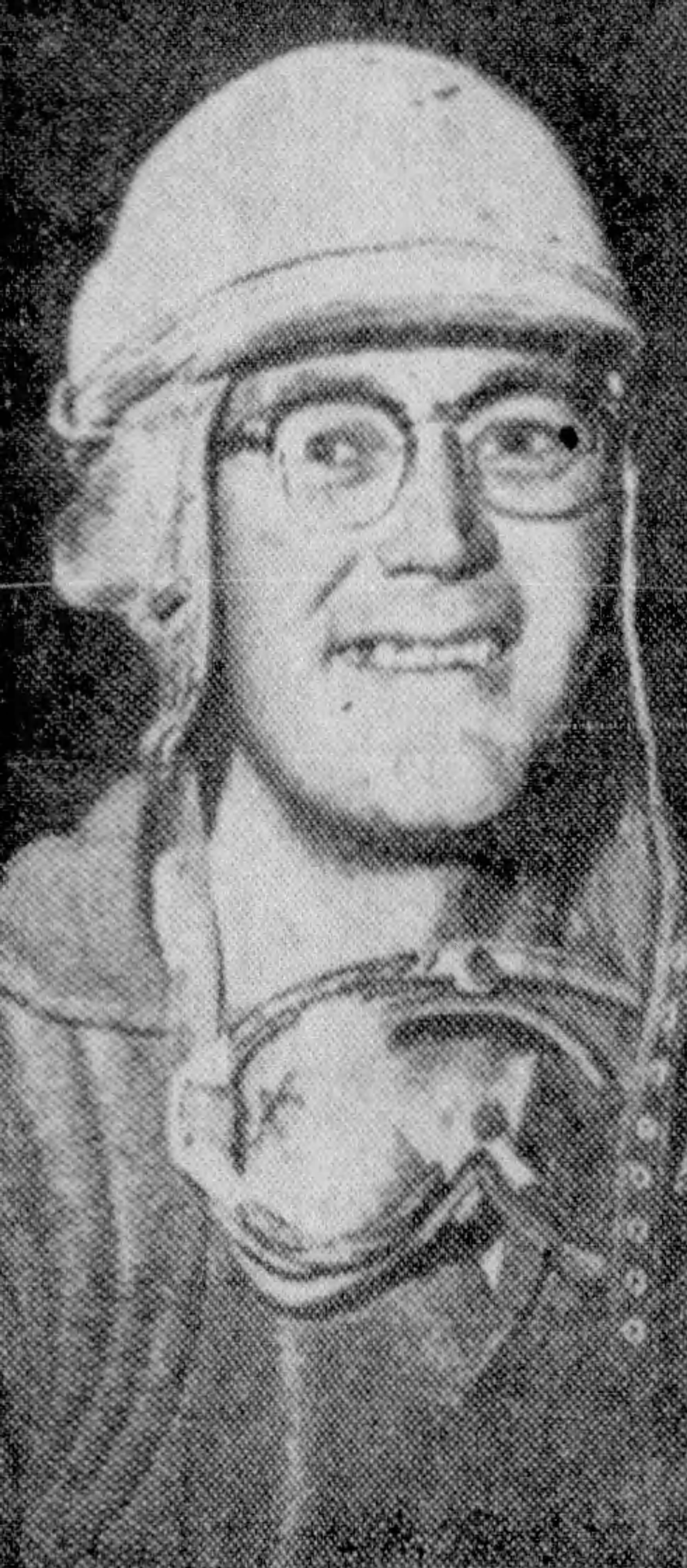
- Haberling c. 1961
- Nationality: American
- Born: Harold Francis Haberling; June 30, 1927
- Died: February 21, 1961 (aged 33) Daytona International Speedway, Daytona Beach, Florida, U.S.

NASCAR Sportsman Modified Series

Harold Francis "Habe" Haberling (June 30, 1927 – February 21, 1961) was an American race car driver. A competitor in the NASCAR Sportsman Modified Series, he died in an accident while practicing for the 250 mile Sportsman Modified race at Daytona in 1961.

== Racing career ==
Haberling began his racing career in the early 1950s in the American Midwest where he competed at numerous track events racing stock cars and hot rods. He later competed in three AAA Stock Car events in which his most notable starts were in Richmond and Milwaukee. He returned to Phoenix, Arizona in the late 1950s to continue racing in supermodifieds and raced alongside future Indy legends Roger McCluskey and Don Davis along with Hank Arnold and Gene Brown.

In 1957, Haberling made the immediate leap into NASCAR. Driving a 1937 Plymouth, he competed in the 1957 NASCAR Modified race at Daytona Beach and finished 13th in the inaugural Modified race at the Daytona International Speedway in 1959.

== Death ==
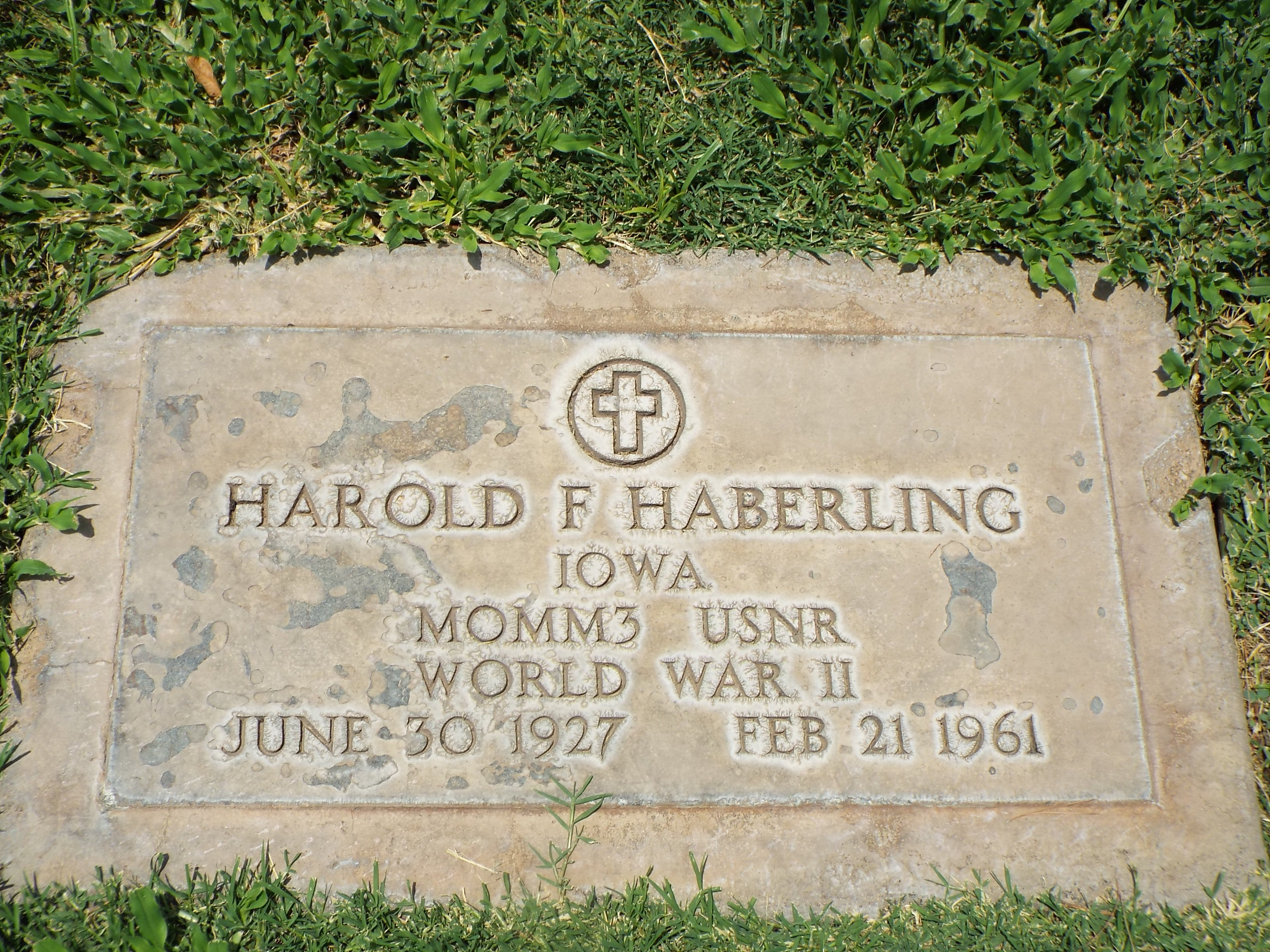
Grave site of Harold "Habe" F. Haberling

On February 21, 1961, Haberling was practicing in his 1955 Chevrolet in preparation for the 1961 NASCAR Sportsman Modified 250 mile race at the Daytona International Speedway when tragedy struck. Having entered the east turn, Haberling's Chevrolet spun sideways, veered down the 31 degree banking, and ran it up again before rolling over several times and coming to a stop near the infield grass. The real cause of how the accident started was never known. The car was destroyed in the accident; Haberling died instantly of massive injuries, his helmet was also torn off in the accident. He was the chairman of the board of directors for the Arizona Roadster Association and was ranked 6th in modified sportsmen points at the time of his death.

Haberling was survived by his wife, Betty Jean (1927-2009), and their three daughters. He was buried in Greenwood/Memory Lawn Cemetery in Phoenix, Arizona, very close to the graves of two other Phoenix auto racing legends, Jimmy Bryan and Bobby Ball, who similarly lost their lives as a result of auto racing accidents.
