= 2018 USAC AMSOIL National Sprint Car Championship =

The 2018 USAC AMSOIL National Sprint Car Championship is the 63rd season of sprint car racing sanctioned by USAC. The 2018 season will feature 45 races on dirt tracks across the United States. The season will begin with Winter Dirt Games at Bubba Raceway Park on February 15, and will end with the Oval Nationals at Perris Auto Speedway on November 10.

== Team & Driver Chart ==
This chart reflects confirmed and cited team & driver combinations only.

No.	Race Driver	Car Owner / Entrant	Chassis	Engine	Rounds
0x	(Iowa) Brandon Stevenson	Brandon Stevenson	Stevenson	Chevrolet	2
1m	(Nebraska) Don Droud Jr.	Mark Burch Motorsports	Schnee	Parker Chevrolet	1
2c	(Indiana) Tim Creech	Amanda Creech	DRC	J&D Chevrolet	2
2E	(Indiana) Nick Bilbee	Epperson Racing	Spike	Claxton Chevrolet	4
2E	(Oklahoma) Tyler Thomas	Epperson Racing	Spike	Claxton Chevrolet	5
2v	(Indiana) Brandon Mattox	Fitzpatrick Autosports	DRC	Hampshire Chevrolet	5
3	(Indiana) Dakota Jackson	Dakota Jackson	DRC	Tranter Chevrolet	5
3c	(Indiana) Kyle Cummins	Eberhardt/Zirzow Racing	DRC	Claxton	14
3R	(California) Kody Swanson	Rock Steady Racing	Mach-1	Foxco Chevrolet	7
3x	(New Jersey) Ryan Godown	Mick Wasitowski	Maxim	Kriner Chevrolet	2
4	(California) Justin Grant	TOPP Motorsports	Maxim	Gaerte Engines	23
4B	Donny Brackett	Brackett			1
4B	(Indiana) Brady Ottinger	4J Motorsports	DRC	J&D Chevrolet	2
4c	Daylan Chambers	Chambers Motorsports		Motorsports Unlimited	1
4F	(New Jersey) Ryan Godown	R & M Motorsports	Triple X	Chevrolet	1
4J	(Indiana) A.J. Hopkins	4J Motorsports	DRC	J&D Chevrolet	2
4m	(California) Joe Stornetta Jr.	Robin Dawkins	Maxim	Maxwell Mopar	2
5	(Illinois) Chris Windom	Baldwin Brothers Racing	DRC	Claxton Mopar	23
5B	(California) Logan Seavey	Chase Briscoe Racing	Maxim	Fisher	5
5B	(California) Thomas Meseraull	Chase Briscoe Racing	Maxim	Fisher	6
5c	(Illinois) Colten Cottle	Rick Cottle	DRC	Foxco Chevrolet	2
5D	(Illinois) Zach Daum	Daum Motorsports	Eagle	Stanton Chevrolet	5
5E	(United Kingdom) Tom Harris	Tom Harris Motorsport	Beast	Gaerte Chevrolet	3
5G	(Illinois) Shane Cottle	Goacher Racing	Maxim	Claxton Mopar	1
5K	(Indiana) Kent Schmidt	Kent Schmidt	Spike	J&D Chevrolet	4
5K	Kellen Conover	Kent Schmidt	Spike	J&D Chevrolet	1
5K	(Indiana) Jordan Kinser	Jordan Kinser Racing	Maxim	Claxton Chevrolet	2
5m	(Indiana) Matt McDonald	Matt McDonald	DRC	J&D Chevrolet	2
5o	(Missouri) Daron Clayton	Kent Schmidt	Spike	J&D Chevrolet	2
6	(Illinois) Mario Clouser	Mario Clouser Motorsports	Maxim	Claxton Chevrolet	4
6	(Indiana) Bill Rose	Bill Rose Racing	DRC	Claxton Chevrolet	2
7	(Pennsylvania) Timmy Buckwalter	LNB Motorsports	Twister	Hershsey Chevrolet	13
7BC	(Indiana) Tyler Courtney	Clauson/Marshall/Newman Racing	Spike	Rider Chevrolet	23
7H	(Pennsylvania) Trey Hivner	Shawn Hivner	Triple X	Zellers Chevrolet	1
7K	(Pennsylvania) Dan Shetler	Dan Shetler	Triple X	HP Chevrolet	1
7m	(Indiana) Tony McVey	Tony McVey	Maxim	Williams Chevrolet	1
8	(Pennsylvania) Kyle Lick	Terry Lick	Maxim	Chevrolet	2
04	(Arizona) Steve Sussex	Josh Burton Racing	DRC	Foxco Chevrolet	2
04	(Illinois) Shane Cockrum	Josh Burton Racing	DRC	Foxco Chevrolet	1
10	(Kentucky) Aric Gentry	Larry Gentry	DRC	Peperak Chevrolet	4
11	James Lyerla	JL			1
11p	(California) Chad Boespflug	Cam Pottorff-Don Short	Spike	SPEC Chevrolet	2
11w	(Kansas) Wyatt Burks	Don Rumsey	Maxim	Salina Chevrolet	2
12	(California) Robert Ballou	Robert Ballou Motorsports	Boss DRC Twister-X	Ott Chevrolet	23
12G	(Iowa) Kelly Graham	Kelly Graham	J&J	Sylvester Chevrolet	1
12w	(Indiana) Harley Burns	Burns-Maurer-Youngblood Motorsports	Twister	Chevrolet	2
12x	(Indiana) Ted Hines	Ted Hines Racing	DRC	J&D Chevrolet	1
13K	(Pennsylvania) Kyle Moddy	Rick Kaylor Racing	Rider	CS9	4
14	(New York (state)) Coleman Gulick	Team Scorpion	Mach-1	Rider Chevrolet	1
14	(Ohio) Chad Wilson	Chad Wilson	DRC	Fisher Chevrolet	2
14	(Pennsylvania) Trevor Kobylarz	RT Racing	Maxim	Chevrolet	3
14c	(Florida) Tyler Clem	Bubba Clem-TSR Motorsports	J&J	Stanton Chevrolet	2
14E	(New York (state)) Eric Jennings	Paul Pinkurous	Maxim	Ott Chevrolet	2
14J	(Indiana) Jadon Rogers	Jadon Rogers	DRC	Engler Chevrolet	3
15	(New Jersey) Mark Bitner	Mark Bitner	Mach-1	Bitner Chevrolet	2
16	(Arizona) Mike Martin	Mike Martin Racing	Maxim	Fisher Chevrolet	3
16	(Indiana) Harley Burns	Doug Rollson Racing	Stealth	Burns Chevrolet	1
16K	(Indiana) Ben Knight	Tom Knight	Maxim	Tranter Chevrolet	1
17	(Indiana) Nick Bilbee	Bilbee Motorsports	DRC	J&D Chevrolet	6
17	(Indiana) Scotty Weir	On The Gass Racing	Maxim	J&D Chevrolet	1
17G	(Indiana) Scotty Weir	On The Gass Racing	Maxim	J&D Chevrolet	4
17GP	(Oklahoma) Tyler Thomas	Michael Dutcher Motorsports	DRC Maxim	Fisher	2
17GP	(Illinois) Shane Cockrum	Michael Dutcher Motorsports	DRC Maxim	Fisher	1
17GP	(Arizona) Jerry Coons Jr.	Michael Dutcher Motorsports	DRC Maxim	Fisher	3
17R	(Indiana) Kyle Robbins	KR Racing	Beast	Shaver Chevrolet	1
18	(North Carolina) Jarett Andretti	Andretti Autosport Short Track	DRC	J&D Chevrolet	18
18	(Ohio) Dallas Hewitt	Todd Keen	DRC	Claxton Chevrolet	2
18T	(Nebraska) Terry Richards	Terry Richards	Triple X	Spanel Chevrolet	1
18w	(Indiana) Jeff Bland Jr.	Waltz Racing	DRC	Kinser Chevrolet	1
19	(Arizona) R.J. Johnson	Reinbold-Underwood Motorsports	Spike	Wesmar Chevrolet	5
19A	(Michigan) Joe Bares	Joe Bares	DRC	Claxton Chevrolet	1
20	(Florida) Frank Carlsson	Frank Carlsson	Maxim	Heartbeat Chevrolet	3
20	(California) Thomas Meseraull	Chris Dyson Racing	Maxim	Speedway Chevrolet	6
21	(Illinois) Carson Short	RCM Motorsports	DRC	SPEC Chevrolet	11
21	(Pennsylvania) Carmen Perigo	John Stehman	Eagle	Chevrolet	6
21	(Nebraska) Ryan Kitchen	Kitchen Motorsports	Spike	Chevrolet	1
21k	(Arizona) Jerry Coons Jr.	Krockenberger Racing	Maxim	Krockenberger Chevrolet	2
21k	(Oklahoma) Jason McDougal	Krockenberger Racing	Maxim	Krockenberger Chevrolet	5
21x	(Florida) Tyler Clem	Rick Pollock	Maxim	Advanced Chevrolet	4
22	(Oklahoma) Kody Barksdale	Barksdale Racing	Maxim	Barksdale Chevrolet	4
22s	(Missouri) Slater Helt	Shawn Helt	Boss	Engine Connection Chevrolet	3
22v	(Indiana) Shelby VanGilder	JR & Debbie VanGilder	DRC	Chevrolet	3
23	Brian Karraker	Karraker			1
23	(California) Kody Swanson	Denny Karraker	Mach-1	Foxco Chevrolet	2
23	(Pennsylvania) Todd Zinn	Todd Zinn	Triple X	Belmit Chevrolet	1
24	(Ohio) Landon Simon	Landon Simon Racing	DRC	J&D Chevrolet	5
24	(Indiana) Nate McMillin	Kenny McMillin	DRC	J&D Chevrolet	3
24	(Minnesota) Brian VanMeveren	Karen Silvers	DRC	Shaver Chevrolet	1
24L	(Ohio) Lee Underwood	Lee Underwood Racing	DRC	Foxco Chevrolet	1
24m	(Indiana) Nate McMillin	Kenny McMillin	DRC	J&D Chevrolet	1
27	Brian Wallace	Wallace			1
28	(Indiana) Brandon Mattox	Mattox-Nigg Racing	DRC	SPEC Chevrolet	6
28	(Indiana) Travis Thompson	Mattox-Nigg Racing	DRC	SPEC Chevrolet	5
30	(Indiana) C.J. Leary	Leary Racing	DRC	1-Way Chevrolet	23
32	(Indiana) Chase Stockon	32 TBI Racing	DRC	Fisher Chevrolet	23
32A	(Illinois) Garrett Aitken	Garrett Aitken	DRC	SPEC Chevrolet	3
33m	(Ohio) Matt Westfall	Ray Marshall Motorsports	Maxim	Hampshire Chevrolet	13
34	(Indiana) Brent Beauchamp	Jeff Olson	Spike	Conn Chevrolet	3
35L	(Nebraska) Cody Ledger	Tracy Ledger	Eagle	Ostrich Chevrolet	1
36	Collin Ambrose	Ambrose			1
36D	(Indiana) Dave Darland	Goodnight Racing / Curb-Agajanian	Maxim	Claxton Chevrolet	23
38	(Indiana) Chet Williams	Troy Fortune Motorsports	DRC	Cummins Chevrolet	2
38	(Wyoming) Mike Dapra	Mike Dapra Racing	Twister	Wesmar Chevrolet	1
39	(Indiana) Matt Goodnight	Goodnight Racing	Maxim	Claxton Chevrolet	3
39	(Arizona) Jerry Coons Jr.	Tim Houge	Maxim	Ott Chevrolet	4
41	Jim Shelton	Shelton			1
44	(California) Joe Stornetta Jr.	Pace Motorsports	DRC	J&D Chevrolet	5
44s	(Ohio) Michael Fischesser	Michael Fischesser	DRC	D&D Chevrolet	1
45	Eric Perrott	Perrott			1
45	(Illinois) Shane Cockrum	Tony Lawrence	DRC	Gaerte Chevrolet	1
50	(Pennsylvania) Tony DiMattia	Tony DiMattia Motorsports	DRC	Ott Chevrolet	14
52	(Indiana) Issac Chapple	LNR-Chapple Racing	DRC	Claxton Chevrolet	23
57	(Missouri) Clinton Boyles	Paul Hazen	DRC	Kercher Chevrolet	5
57	(Nebraska) T.J. Artz	Artz & Sons	DRC	Claxton Chevrolet	1
57K	(Indiana) Kevin Studley	Kevin Studley	Maxim	J&D Chevrolet	1
59	(North Carolina) Johnny Petrozelle	Petrozelle Autosport	GF1	Chevrolet	7
61m	(Indiana) Stephen Schnapf	Randy Edwards	Maxim	SPEC Chevrolet	2
63	(Oklahoma) Brady Bacon	Dooling/Hayward Motorsports with RCR	Spike	Stanton Mopar	3
69	(Alabama) Kevin Thomas Jr.	Dynamics, Inc. (Hoffman Auto Racing)	DRC	Speedway Chevrolet	23
70	(Indiana) Jordan Kinser	Hurst Brothers Racing	DRC	Hurst Chevrolet	4
71	(Iowa) Robert Bell	Robert Bell	Eagle	Ostrich Chevrolet	19
71p	(Indiana) Shane Cottle	Daigh-Phillips Motorsports	DRC	Foxco Chevrolet	4
71p	(Illinois) Shane Cockrum	Daigh-Phillips Motorsports	DRC	Foxco Chevrolet	1
74JR	(Pennsylvania) J.R. Berry	J.R. Berry	Triple X	Berry Chevrolet	1
74x	(New Mexico) Josh Hodges	Hodges Motorsports	DRC	Gibson Chevrolet	7
75	(New South Wales) Glen Saville	Glen Saville	Triple X	GPS Chevrolet	2
77K	(Iowa) Katlynn Leer	Joe Leer	Maxim	Felker Chevrolet	1
78	(Minnesota) Rob Caho Jr.	Rob Caho Jr.	Maxim	Claxton Chevrolet	1
79	(New York (state)) Ryan Susice	Dick Mahoney	DRC	Speedy Auto Machine Chevrolet	1
87	(Ohio) Paul Dues	Dues Racing	Maxim	Krieger Chevrolet	2
89	(Indiana) Shawn Westerfeld	Bill Westerfeld	DRC	Foxco Chevrolet	1
89BW	(New South Wales) Braydan Willmington	Team RayPro	DRC	RayPro Chevrolet	1
91R	(California) Brody Roa	BR Performance	Maxim	Shaver Chevrolet	7
92	(California) Jake Swanson	Jim & Laurie Sertich	Triple X	Kistler Chevrolet	5
96	(Ohio) Riley VanHise	VanHise Racing	Triple X	Williams Chevrolet	2
97x	(Indiana) Tyler Hewitt	One More Time Motorsports	Maxim	McGunegill Chevrolet	1
98	(California) Chad Boespflug	NineEight Motorsports	Maxim	Claxton Chevrolet	21
98m	(Indiana) Brandon Morin	Steve Morin	DRC	Claxton Chevrolet	1
99	(Oklahoma) Brady Bacon	Brady Bacon Racing	Triple X	Rider Chevrolet	20
99B	(Indiana) Eric Burns	Bill Gasway	Stealth	M & R Chevrolet	2
B1	(Pennsylvania) Joey Biasi	Shaup Brothers Racing	Maxim	Burns & Yost	6

=== Driver & Team Changes ===
- Dave Darland will team up with Goodnight Racing for the 2018 USAC AMSOIL National Sprint Car Championship. Darland has previously raced for the team in recent years. Darland will run car #36D while using Maxim chassis & Claxton engines.
- - Dooling/Hayward Motorsports formed an alliance with Richard Childress Racing to team up for the 2018 season with entries in USAC's P1 Insurance National Midget Championship & AMSOIL National Sprint Car Championship. Brady Bacon will race for the championship in both Midget & Sprint Car series for the team. Following the first 3 races at Ocala, the Dooling/Hayward sprint car effort was put on hiatus.
- - Kevin Thomas Jr. will move to Hoffman Auto Racing to race the #69 Mean Green car for the 2018 season.
- - Ryan Newman has formed a partnership with Clauson/Marshall Racing to form their new sprint car team (Clauson/Marshall/Newman Racing). Tyler Courtney will run for the team in 2018 in the #7BC car.
- - Justin Grant will move to TOPP Motorsports to run the entire USAC Sprint Car schedule in 2018.
- - Kyle Cummins has joined Eberhardt/Zirzow Racing for the 2018 season.
- - Brady Bacon will chase the rest of the USAC championship in his own equipment starting at Lawrenceburg in March.
- - Following the Indiana Sprint Week race at Kokomo, Chad Boespflug moved his #98 team to a part-time basis on the USAC Sprint Car tour.

== Schedule ==
The 2018 schedule for the USAC AMSOIL National Sprint Car Championship features 45 races (solely on dirt ovals) across 13 states. The entire season will have on-demand video coverage by Loudpedal.TV. MavTV (in association with Speed Sport) will broadcast the Weedsport race on delay. Select races will be broadcast live online by Speed Shift TV. The Cushion will broadcast the races at Knoxville & BAPS. DIRTvision.com will broadcast the #LetsRaceTwo weekend at Eldora. Eldora Speedway will broadcast the 4 Crown Nationals live on their streaming website.

No.	Date	Race title	Track	TV/Stream
1	February 15	Winter Dirt Games	Bubba Raceway Park, Ocala, Florida	Speed Shift TV
2	February 16	Winter Dirt Games	Bubba Raceway Park, Ocala, Florida	Speed Shift TV
3	February 17	Winter Dirt Games	Bubba Raceway Park, Ocala, Florida	Speed Shift TV
≠	March 31		Lawrenceburg Speedway, Lawrenceburg, Indiana	
≠	April 21		Montpelier Motor Speedway, Montpelier, Indiana	
4	April 27		Bloomington Speedway, Bloomington, Indiana	Speed Shift TV
5	April 28	Spring Showdown	Tri-State Speedway, Haubstadt, Indiana	
6	May 5		Plymouth Speedway, Plymouth, Indiana	Speed Shift TV
7	May 11	#LetsRaceTwo	Eldora Speedway, Rossburg, Ohio	DIRTvision.com
8	May 12	#LetsRaceTwo	Eldora Speedway, Rossburg, Ohio	DIRTvision.com
≠	May 18	Brandt presents the River Town Showdown	Tri-City Speedway, Granite City, Illinois	
≠	May 19	Brandt presents the River Town Showdown	Federated Auto Parts Raceway I-55, Pevely, Missouri	
9	May 23	Tony Hulman Classic	Terre Haute Action Track, Terre Haute, Indiana	Speed Shift TV
10	June 8		I-80 Speedway, Greenwood, Nebraska	Speed Shift TV
11	June 9		Knoxville Raceway, Knoxville, Iowa	The Cushion
12	June 14	Eastern Storm USAC Jesse Hockett Classic	Grandview Speedway, Bechtelsville, Pennsylvania	Speed Shift TV
13	June 15	Eastern Storm	Williams Grove Speedway, Mechanicsburg, Pennsylvania	Speed Shift TV
14	June 16	Eastern Storm	Port Royal Speedway, Port Royal, Pennsylvania	Speed Shift TV
15	June 17	Eastern Storm	BAPS Motor Speedway, York Haven, Pennsylvania	The Cushion
16	June 18	Eastern Storm	Bridgeport Speedway, Swedesboro, New Jersey	
17	June 19	Eastern Storm	Weedsport Speedway, Weedsport, New York	Speed Shift TV (live) MavTV (delayed)
18	July 6	Bill Gardner Sprintacular	Lincoln Park Speedway, Putnamville, Indiana	
19	July 20	NOS Energy Drink Indiana Sprint Week	Plymouth Speedway, Plymouth, Indiana	Speed Shift TV
≠	July 21	NOS Energy Drink Indiana Sprint Week	Kokomo Speedway, Kokomo, Indiana	
20	July 22	NOS Energy Drink Indiana Sprint Week	Lawrenceburg Speedway, Lawrenceburg, Indiana	Speed Shift TV
21	July 24	NOS Energy Drink Indiana Sprint Week	Kokomo Speedway, Kokomo, Indiana	Speed Shift TV
22	July 25	NOS Energy Drink Indiana Sprint Week	Terre Haute Action Track, Terre Haute, Indiana	Speed Shift TV
23	July 26	NOS Energy Drink Indiana Sprint Week	Lincoln Park Speedway, Putnamville, Indiana	
24	July 27	NOS Energy Drink Indiana Sprint Week	Bloomington Speedway, Bloomington, Indiana	Speed Shift TV
25	July 28	NOS Energy Drink Indiana Sprint Week	Tri-State Speedway, Haubstadt, Indiana	
*	August 22	#GYATK Night	Kokomo Speedway, Kokomo, Indiana	Speed Shift TV
26	August 23	Sprint Car Smackdown	Kokomo Speedway, Kokomo, Indiana	Speed Shift TV
27	August 24	Sprint Car Smackdown	Kokomo Speedway, Kokomo, Indiana	Speed Shift TV
≠	August 25	Sprint Car Smackdown	Kokomo Speedway, Kokomo, Indiana	Speed Shift TV
28	August 31	Brandt presents the River Town Showdown	Tri-City Speedway, Granite City, Illinois	
29	September 1	Brandt presents the River Town Showdown	Federated Auto Parts Raceway I-55, Pevely, Missouri	Speed Shift TV
30	September 7		Gas City I-69 Speedway, Gas City, Indiana	
31	September 9	Sprint Car Smackdown	Kokomo Speedway, Kokomo, Indiana	Speed Shift TV
32	September 14	Jim Hurtubise Classic	Terre Haute Action Track, Terre Haute, Indiana	
33	September 15	Haubstadt Hustler	Tri-State Speedway, Haubstadt, Indiana	
34	September 22	4 Crown Nationals	Eldora Speedway, Rossburg, Ohio	EldoraSpeedway.com
35	September 29	Fall Nationals	Lawrenceburg Speedway, Lawrenceburg, Indiana	
36	October 5		Lake Ozark Speedway, Eldon, Missouri	
37	October 6		Lakeside Speedway, Kansas City, Kansas	
38	October 12	Wabash Clash	Terre Haute Action Track, Terre Haute, Indiana	Speed Shift TV
39	November 2	Western World Championships	Arizona Speedway, San Tan Valley, Arizona	Speed Shift TV
40	November 3	Western World Championships	Arizona Speedway, San Tan Valley, Arizona	Speed Shift TV
41	November 8	Budweiser Oval Nationals	Perris Auto Speedway, Perris, California	Speed Shift TV
42	November 9	Budweiser Oval Nationals	Perris Auto Speedway, Perris, California	Speed Shift TV
43	November 10	Budweiser Oval Nationals	Perris Auto Speedway, Perris, California	Speed Shift TV

combination race with USAC/CRA AMSOIL Sprint Car Series
combination race with Midwest Sprint Car Series
- - * will state if the race is a non points event.
- - ≠ will state if the race was postponed or canceled

=== Schedule notes and changes ===
- - 1 new round & 2 new tracks were added on the Eastern Storm tour, those include Bridgeport Speedway & Weedsport Speedway. However, Lincoln Speedway will not returning to Eastern Storm schedule in 2018.
- - Tri-City Speedway & Federated Auto Parts Raceway at I-55 both return to the schedule in 2018 after last year's races were washed out at both venues.
- - Lake Ozark Speedway is another new venue added to the 2018 calendar, and will run in October as a doubleheader weekend with Lakeside.
- - the March 31 race at Lawrenceburg Speedway was canceled due to saturated grounds & poor weather conditions.
- - the April 21 race at Montpelier Motor Speedway was canceled due to weather conditions.
- - Night #1 of the River Town Showdown at Tri-City Speedway (May 18) was rained out. The race has been rescheduled for August 31.
- - Night #2 of the River Town Showdown at Federated Auto Parts Raceway at I-55 (May 19) was rained out. The race has been rescheduled for September 1.
- - USAC announced on June 4 that Plymouth Speedway would be hosting the opening round of Indiana Sprint Week.
- - USAC announced on June 7 that a race has been added to the schedule at Gas City I-69 Speedway, it will be held on September 7.
- - Night #3 of the Sprint Car Smackdown at Kokomo Speedway (August 25) was postponed to September 9th due to rain.

== Results and standings ==
=== Races ===
No.	Race / Track	Winning driver	Winning team	Hard Charger Award winner	B-main/Semi winners
1	Winter Dirt Games 9	Chase Stockon	32 TBI Racing	Chad Boespflug	Nick Bilbee
2	Winter Dirt Games 9	Tyler Courtney	Clauson / Marshall / Newman Racing	Robert Ballou	Logan Seavey
3	Winter Dirt Games 9	Tyler Courtney	Clauson / Marshall / Newman Racing	Chris Windom	Justin Grant
4	Bloomington	Dave Darland	Goodnight Racing / Curb-Agajanian	Logan Seavey	Tyler Thomas
5	Spring Showdown	Kevin Thomas Jr.	Dynamics Inc.	Robert Ballou	Logan Seavey
6	Plymouth	Kevin Thomas Jr.	Dynamics Inc.	Robert Ballou	-
7	#LetsRaceTwo	Brady Bacon	Brady Bacon Racing	Brady Bacon	-
8	#LetsRaceTwo	Chris Windom	Baldwin Brothers Racing	Paul Dues	-
9	Tony Hulman Classic	Tyler Courtney	Clauson / Marshall / Newman Racing	Chris Windom	-
10	I-80	Kevin Thomas Jr.	Dynamics Inc.	Tyler Courtney	Don Droud Jr.
11	Knoxville	Tyler Courtney	Clauson / Marshall / Newman Racing	Dave Darland	
12	Eastern Storm / Grandview	Brady Bacon	Brady Bacon Racing	Tyler Courtney	Chase Stockon
13	Eastern Storm / Williams Grove	Chris Windom	Baldwin Brothers Racing	Issac Chapple	-
14	Eastern Storm / Port Royal	Chris Windom	Baldwin Brothers Racing	Timmy Buckwalter	-
15	Eastern Storm / Susquehanna	Robert Ballou	Robert Ballou Motorsports	Justin Grant	Tony DiMattia
16	Eastern Storm / Bridgeport	Kevin Thomas Jr.	Dynamics Inc.	Brady Bacon	-
17	Eastern Storm / Weedsport	Thomas Meseraull	Chris Dyson Racing	Robert Ballou	-
18	Bill Gardner Sprintacular	Tyler Courtney	Clauson / Marshall / Newman Racing	Jason McDougal	Carson Short
19	NOS Energy Drink Indiana Sprint Week - Plymouth	Brady Bacon	Brady Bacon Racing	Tyler Courtney	Kevin Thomas Jr.
20	NOS Energy Drink Indiana Sprint Week - Lawrenceburg	Tyler Courtney	Clauson / Marshall / Newman Racing	Robert Ballou	Kevin Thomas Jr.
21	NOS Energy Drink Indiana Sprint Week - Kokomo	Thomas Meseraull	Chase Briscoe Racing	Josh Hodges	Kevin Thomas Jr.
22	NOS Energy Drink Indiana Sprint Week - Terre Haute	Tyler Courtney	Clauson / Marshall / Newman Racing	Chris Windom	Jake Swanson
23	NOS Energy Drink Indiana Sprint Week - Putnamville	Dave Darland	Goodnight Racing - Curb-Agajanian	Kyle Cummins	Tyler Thomas
24	NOS Energy Drink Indiana Sprint Week - Bloomington	C.J. Leary	Leary Racing	Kevin Thomas Jr.	Brady Bacon
25	NOS Energy Drink Indiana Sprint Week - Haubstadt	Dave Darland	Goodnight Racing - Curb-Agajanian	Brady Bacon	Josh Hodges
*	Sprint Car Smackdown - #GYATK Night	Chris Windom	Baldwin Brothers Racing	Carson Short	Stevie Sussex
26	Sprint Car Smackdown - Night #1	Tyler Courtney	Clauson/Marshall/Newman Racing	Brady Bacon	Kyle Cummins
27	Sprint Car Smackdown - Night #2	Tyler Thomas	Epperson Racing	Chase Stockon	Clinton Boyles
28	River Town Showdown - Granite City	Tyler Courtney	Clauson/Marshall/Newman Racing	Daron Clayton	Joe B. Miller

== See also ==
- 2018 USAC P1 Insurance National Midget Championship
- 2018 USAC Silver Crown Series
