= 2018 USAC P1 Insurance National Midget Championship =

The 2018 USAC P1 Insurance National Midget Championship is the 63rd season of the Midget series sanctioned by USAC. P1 Insurance becomes the new title sponsor of the series for 2018. The season will begin with the Shamrock Classic at Southern Illinois Center on March 10, and will end with the Turkey Night Grand Prix at Ventura Raceway on November 22. The series will also have a non points race with the Junior Knepper 55 at Southern Illinois Center on December 15. Spencer Bayston enters the season as the defending champion.

== Team and driver chart ==
No.	Race Driver	Car Owner / Entrant	Chassis	Engine	Rounds
1	Conor Daly	Landon Simon Racing	Stealth	Chevrolet	1
1	Kyle Larson	Keith Kunz Motorsports - Curb-Agajanian	Bullet by Spike	Speedway Toyota	1
1BR	Dave Darland	SFH Racing Development	Beast	Speedway Mopar	1
1K	Brayton Lynch	Rusty Kunz Racing	Spike	Stanton SR-11	14
1p	Tristin Thomas	Kelly Nichols	Spike	Chevrolet	1
1p	Ricky Lewis	Kelly Nichols	Spike	Chevrolet	1
1ST	Shane Cottle	Daryl Saucier	Spike	Esslinger	1
1T	Tony Roney	Rich Roney	Stealth	Fontana	1
1T	Tyler Shoemaker	Jay Mounce	Spike	Chevrolet	1
1x	Johnathon Henry	LKK Racing	Ellis	Fontana	1
2	Ryan Hall	Mark Bush	Spike	Essligner	1
2	Kevin Woody Jr.	Justin Dukes	Spike	Chevrolet	1
2B	Brett Becker	Becker	Spike	Stanton SR-11	4
2D	Matt Sherrell	Dan & Patricia Harris	Spike	Mopar	1
2ND	Jeb Sessums	Dan & Patricia Harris	Spike	Mopar	1
2s	Travis Scott	Scott			1
3c	Tanner Thorson	Tri-C Motorsports	Spike	Stanton SR-11	5
3F	Geoff Ensign	Ted Finkenbinder	Bullet	Warrior	1
3N	Jake Neuman	Jim Neuman	BOSS	Stanton SR-11	5
3ON	Hudson O'Neal	Jim Neuman	Boss	Stanton SR-11	1
4	Ryan Greth	Wayne Lesher	Spike	Stanton SR-11	1
4	C.J. Leary	TOPP Motorsports	Beast	TOPP Honda	1
4	Curtis Spicer	Spicer Racecraft	Stealth	Fontana	4
4A	Casey Shuman	RAMS Racing	Boss	Esslinger	1
4D	Robert Dalby	Ken Dalby	Spike	Esslinger	3
4m	Michelle Decker	Stephanie Meents	BOSS	Tranter Esslinger	1
5	Chris Windom	Baldwin Brothers Racing	Spike	Claxton Ford	1
5	C.J. Leary	Baldwin Brothers Racing	Spike	Claxton Ford	1
5	Sterling Cling	Petry Motorsports	Spike	Speedway Toyota	2
5B	Chase Briscoe	Briscoe Racing	Spike	Esslinger	1
5D	Zach Daum	Daum Motorsports	Eagle	Speedway Toyota	2
5T	Presley Truedson	Daum Motorsports	Eagle	Stanton Toyota	1
5v	Jesse Vermillion	Vermillion Racing	Boss	Gaerte Chevrolet	1
5x	Roy Caruthers	Boyle Racing Headquarters	Bullet	Mopar	1
7	Gage Walker	Brian Walker	Spike	Esslinger	4
7	Shawn Jackson	Shawn Jackson	Elite	Esslinger	2
7	Daniel Anderson	Scott Anderson	Spike	Van Dyne	2
7B	Austin Brown	Factory BOSS Racing	BOSS	Toyota	1
7BC	Tyler Courtney	Clauson-Marshall Racing	Spike	Stanton SR-11	17
7CG	Austin Langenstein	Seven, LLC	Mal-1	Chevrolet	1
7CH	Critter Malone	Seven, LLC	Mal-1	Ford	1
7D	Dave Darland	Dave Estep	Spike	Esslinger	1
7F	Andrew Felker	BOSS Factory Racing	BOSS	Toyota	1
7G	Brian Grogan	Brian Grogan	Spike	Stanton SR-11	1
7K	Zach Hampton	K&R Racing	Spike	Irwin Mopar	2
7K	Matt Lux	K&R Racing	Spike	Irwin Mopar	1
7p	Brian Peterson	Brian Peterson	Stealth	C&S Honda	1
7u	Grady Chandler	Trifecta Motorsports	Spike	Esslinger	1
8	Johnny Petrozelle	Cornell Racing Stables	Stealth	Autocraft Volkswagen	1
8	Randi Pankratz	Wally Pankratz	Edmunds	Fontana	2
8c	Johnny Petrozelle	Curt Cornell	Stealth	Autocraft Volkswagen	1
8J	Jonathan Beason	Hard Eight Racing	Spike	Esslinger	1
8JR	Bear Wood	Bear Wood	Felker	Hickernell Gaerte	1
8K	Jonathan Beason	Hard Eight Racing			1
9	Matt Moore	Hergott Racing Development	Bullet by Spike	Mopar	2
9D	Michael Faccinto	Dodenhoff Motorsports	Spike	Fontana	2
0	Kevin Woody Jr.	Steve Buckwalter	Elite	A1 Chevrolet	1
0	Steve Buckwalter	Steve Buckwalter	Elite	A1 Chevrolet	1
0NJ	Brett Conkling	Brett Conkling	Stealth	Gaerte Chevrolet	1
08	Cannon McIntosh	David McIntosh	Spike	Toyota	1
10	Lance Bennett	Bennett Motorsports	Spike	Fontana Chevrolet	4
10b	Blaze Bennett	Bennett Motorsports	Spike	Fontana Chevrolet	3
10w	Shaun Jones	Chris Walker	Stealth	Esslinger	1
11	Brent Beauchamp	B & B Motorsports	Spike	Esslinger	1
11	Tracy Hines	Leader Card Racers	Spike	Stanton Mopar	1
11A	C.J. Leary	Gray Auto	Spike	Esslinger	1
11A	Anton Hernandez	Gray Auto	Spike	Esslinger	1
11AG	C.J. Leary	Gray Auto	Spike	Esslinger	1
11c	Glenn Waterland	Hayley Waterland	Beast	Gaerte Chevrolet	3
11L	Aaron Leffel	Chuck Taylor	Beast	Chevrolet	1
11T	Trey Osborne	Chuck Taylor	Beast	Chevrolet	1
11Y	Travis Young	Travis Young	Beast	Esslinger	2
12	Brett Ardnt	Randy Heckman	Elite	Fontana Ford	1
12	J.B. Gilbert	J.B. Gilbert	Stealth	Chevrolet	1
12w	Billy Wease	Amanda Wease	Spike	Esslinger	1
14	Holley Hollan	Keith Kunz Motorsports - Curb/Agajanian	Bullet by Spike	Speedway Toyota	2
14J	Holley Hollan	Factory BOSS Racing	BOSS	Toyota	1
14s	McKenna Haase	RAMS Racing	BOSS	Mopar	1
15	Kevin Thomas Jr.	Petry-Goff Motorsports	Spike	Speedway Toyota	2
15	Jason McDougal	Petry-Goff Motorsports	Spike	Speedway Toyota	13
15c	Carson Garrett	Broc Garrett	Spike	Esslinger	2
15x	Ashley Heredia	Ron Hazelton	Beast	Stanton Mopar	1
17BC	Justin Grant	Clauson-Marshall Racing	Spike	Stanton SR-11	15
17BC	Cole Bodine	Clauson-Marshall Racing	Spike	Stanton SR-11	2
17D	Dakota Jackson	Koontz Racing	Spike	Esslinger	1
17G	Dustin Golobic	Matt Wood	Spike	Esslinger	2
17K	Michael Koontz	Koontz Racing	Spike	Esslinger	1
17s	Ricky Stenhouse Jr.	Clauson-Marshall Racing	Spike	Stanton SR-11	1
17s	Sheldon Haudenschild	Clauson-Marshall Racing	Spike	Stanton SR-11	1
17w	Shane Golobic	Clauson-Marshal Racing / Matt Wood	Spike	Stanton SR-11	3
18	Rich Drangmeister	Rich Drangmeister	Lightning	Chevrolet	1
19m	Ethan Mitchell	John Mitchell	BOSS	BundyBuilt Honda	9
20	C.J. Sarna	C.J. Sarna	Spike	Esslinger	2
21	Rico Abreu	Keith Kunz Motorsports - Curb-Agajanian	Bullet by Spike	Speedway Toyota	4
21	Christopher Bell	Keith Kunz Motorsports - Curb-Agajanian	Bullet by Spike	Speedway Toyota	4
21	Tommy Kunsman	TK Racing	Elite	Hawk Chevrolet	1
21D	Justin Dickerson	Justin Dickerson	Spike	Esslinger	3
21K	Kyle Larson	Keith Kunz Motorsports - Curb-Agajanian	Bullet by Spike	Speedway Toyota	1
21K	Karter Sarff	Steve Reynolds	BOSS	Stanton SR-11	1
21p	Daryn Pittman	Pittman Motorsports	Spike	Esslinger	1
21T	Tanner Thorson	Steve Reynolds / Rip Jetson	Ripper by Jetson	Stanton SR-11	1
21x	Damian Lopez	Brooke Shuman Motorsports	Boss	Chevrolet	2
21x	Landon Cassill	Brooke Shuman Motorsports	Boss	Chevrolet	1
22	John Heydenreich	John Heydenreich	Beast	Chevrolet	1
23	David Budres	Manic Racing	Stealth	Fontana	2
23m	Kenny Miller	Kenny Miller	Spike	Esslinger	2
24	Landon Simon	Landon Simon Racing	Triple X	Toyota	2
24x	David Prickett	Neverlift Motorsports	Spike	Chevrolet	2
25	Jerry Coons Jr.	Petry Motorsports	Spike	Speedway Toyota	15
25p	Dylan Peterson	Vance Peterson	Spike	Esslinger	1
25s	Alex Schriever	Jeff Davis	Twister	Fontana	1
25x	Giovanni Scelzi	Tom Malloy	King	Toyota	2
25x	Damion Gardner	Jerome Rodela	Breka	Pink Toyota	1
27	Tucker Klaasmeyer	Keith Kunz Motorsports - Curb-Agajanian	Bullet by Spike	Speedway Toyota	13
27z	Zane Hendricks	Tucker-Boat Motorsports	Spike	Speedway Toyota	11
28	Kory Schudy	Jon Sawyer Racing	Boss	Gaerte	1
28	Ace McCarthy	Two-Eight			1
28	Alex Schutte	Schutte & McElwee	Spike	Toyota	2
29	Timmy Buckwalter	Seymour Racing	Spike	Stanton Mopar	1
29	Ryan Wilson	Clover Motorsports	Elite	Fontana Chevrolet	1
29	Joey Moughan	Tom Casson	BOSS	Esslinger	1
29J	Brian Karraker	Tony Jarrett	DRC	Mopar	1
31	Ray Seach	David Budres	Stealth	Fontana	2
31	Kyle Beilman	Bill Bellman	Spike	Grimes Mopar	2
32	Trey Marcham	Marcham			1
32	Nick Hamilton	Mike Hamilton	Spike	Esslinger	1
33	Chase Jones	Team RayPro	Spike	RayPro Mopar	6
33	Davey Ray	Team RayPro	Bullet by Spike	RayPro Mopar	1
33c	Chase Johes	Team RayPro	Spike	RayPro Mopar	1
33P	Mike Leach Jr.	Mike Leach Sr.	Edmunds	Arias	1
35	Andrew Layser	Alex Bright Racing	Elite	Stanton SR-11	3
35	Matt Moore	Petry-Goff Motorsports	Spike	Speedway Toyota	4
35	Maria Cofer	Petry-Goff Motorsports	Spike	Speedway Toyota	4
35	Chris Windom	Petry-Goff Motorsports	Spike	Speedway Toyota	2
35	Holley Hollan	Petry-Goff Motorsports	Spike	Speedway Toyota	3
35L	Andrew Layser	Alex Bright Racing	Elite	Stanton SR-11	2
35x	Chris Baue	Chris Baue	Stealth	Chevrolet	2
37	Terry Babb	A.J. Felker Racing	FSC	Felker Fontana -	2
37	Max Guilford	A.J. Felker Racing	FSC	Esslinger -	3
37K	Riley Kreisel	A.J. Felker Racing	FSC	Esslinger	1
37T	Glen Saville	A.J. Felker Racing	FSC	Felker Esslinger	1
37x	Colten Cottle	A.J. Felker Racing	FSC	Felker Esslinger	1
37x	Payton Pierce	A.J. Felker Racing	FSC	Felker Esslinger	1
39	Kyle May	Kyle May	Elite	Esslinger	3
39BC	Zeb Wise	Clauson-Marshall Racing	Spike	Stanton SR-11	12
39BC	Cole Bodine	Clauson-Marshall Racing	Spike	Stanton SR-11	4
41	Howard Morre	Chris Chappue	Bullet	Gaerte Chevrolet	1
42	Hank Davis	Dean Franklin	BOSS	Gaerte	1
43	Logan Arnold	Kevin Arnold	Stealth	Esslinger	1
44	Wesley Smith	Brian Smith	Spike	Gaerte Chevrolet	1
45	Tony Lawrence	Tony Lawrence	DRC	Esslinger	1
45	Jake Morgan	Gary Morgan	Stealth	Gaerte	1
46	Kenney Johnson	Jeff Johnson	Spike	Autocraft Volkswagen	1
46	Robby Spino	Jeff Johnson	Spike	Autocraft Volkswagen	1
49	Andy Bradley	Andy Bradley	Spike	Esslinger	2
50	Daniel Adler	Mike Adler	Triple X	Esslinger	1
51	Russ Gamester	G&R Racing	GRP	Chevrolet	2
51B	Joe B. Miller	Jim Neuman	Boss	Stanton SR-11	2
54	Matt Westfall	Steve Bordner	DRC	Fontana	1
54p	Kyle Pfeifer	Pfeifer Racing	Eagle	Esslinger	1
55	Nick Drake	Troy Cline	Spike	Esslinger	1
55	C.J. Leary	Alex Bowman	Stewart	Stanton SR-11	1
56x	Mark Chisholm	Fifty6x Racing	BOSS	Stanton Toyota	3
56y	Garrett Thomas	Fifty6x Racing	BOSS	Fontana	1
57	Jason Rice	Wayne Rice	Stealth	Gaerte Ford	2
57	Spencer Bayston	Keith Kunz Motorsports - Curb-Agajanian	Bullet by Spike	Speedway Toyota	1
57	Maria Cofer	Johnny Cofer	Spike	Esslinger	2
57A	Andrew Felker	Bill Ecker	Spike	Mopar	1
57B	Chase McDermand	Bill Ecker	Spike	Fontana	1
57BC	Cole Bodine	Clauson-Marshall Racing	Spike	Stanton SR-11	1
57D	Daniel Robinson	McCreery Motorsports	Triple X	Esslinger	2
57F	Nate Foster	Nate Foster	Kenyon	Yamaha	1
57K	Kevin Studley	Studley Motorsports	Stealth	J&D Ford	2
63	Thomas Meseraull	Dooling/Hayward Motorsports with RCR	Spike	Stanton SR-11	2
63	Kevin Thomas Jr.	Dooling/Hayward Motorsports with RCR	Spike	Stanton SR-11	13
63D	J. J. Yeley	Dooling/Hayward Motorsports	Spike	Stanton SR-11	1
67	Logan Seavey	Keith Kunz Motorsports - Curb-Agajanian	Bullet by Spike	Speedway Toyota	17
67F	Kyle O'Gara	SFH Racing Development	Beast	Speedway Mopar	3
67K	Harli White	Keith Kunz Motorsports - Curb-Agajanian	Bullet by Spike	Speedway Toyota	1
67K	Holly Shelton	Keith Kunz Motorsports - Curb-Agajanian	Bullet by Spike	Speedway Toyota	13
67R	Ryan Smith	SFH Racing Development	Beast	Speedway Mopar	1
67x	Austin Liggett	Mike Bock	Spike	Esslinger	1
67z	Michael Pickens	Willie Kahne	CS9	Mopar	1
68	Dave Darland	SFH Racing Development	Beast	Speedway Mopar	1
68	C.J. Leary	Six8 Motorsports	Stewart	Esslinger	1
68	Robby Josett	Six8 Motorsports	Stewart	Esslinger	1
68w	Jake Swanson	Six8 Motorsports	Stewart	Esslinger	2
71	Ryan Robinson	Keith Kunz Motorsports - Curb-Agajanian	Bullet by Spike	Speedway Toyota	13
71D	Bryan Drollinger	Drollinger Racing	Stealth	Chevrolet	1
71H	Chris Hettinger	Hettinger Motorsports	Spike	Esslinger	4
71K	Tanner Carrick	Keith Kunz Motorsports - Curb-Agajanian	Bullet by Spike	Speedway Toyota	17
71s	Cody Swanson	Marcia Campbell	Spike	Stanton	2
71X	Brian Drollinger	Drollinger Racing	Stealth	Chevrolet	1
71X	Jesse Colwell	Keith Kunz Motorsports - Curb-Agajanian	Bullet by Spike	Speedway Toyota	2
71 1/2	Robert Bell	Robert Bell Motorsports	Zero	GM Ecotec	2
72	Sam Johnson	Keith Kunz Motorsports - Curb-Agajanian	Bullet by Spike	Speedway Toyota	15
73	Dylan Ito	Keith Ford	TCR	Esslinger	1
73K	Buddy Kofoid	Keith Ford	TCR	Esslinger	1
73T	Ryan Bernal	Keith Ford	TCR	Esslinger	1
73x	Carson Macedo	Keith Ford	TCR	Esslinger	1
74	Chad Boat	Tucker-Boat Motorsports	Spike	Speedway Toyota	1
74m	Adam Pierson	Joe Mancini	Spike	Esslinger	2
76E	Kyle Craker	FMR Racing	Beast	Toyota	8
76E	Justin Grant	FMR Racing	Beast	Toyota	2
76m	Brady Bacon	FMR Racing	Beast	Toyota	17
77	Alex Bright	Alex Bright Racing	Elite	Stanton SR-11	10
77	Payton Pierce	Simmons			1
77	Olivia Bennett	Bennett Motorsports	Spike	Pontiac	3
77u	Chris Urish	Tom Casson			1
77x	Andrew Layser	Alex Bright Racing	Elite	Stanton SR-11	4
77x	Olivia Bennett	Bennett Motorsports	Spike	Pontiac	1
80	Josh Hawkins	Josh Hawkins	Spike	Gaerte Chevrolet	1
83	Karsyn Elledge	Tucker/Boat Motorsports	Spike	Speedway Toyota	2
84	Chad Boat	Tucker-Boat Motorsports	Spike	Speedway Toyota	16
84s	Shaun Shapel	Shapel Racing	Zero	Honda	2
85	Dave Darland	Central Motor Sports	Spike	Stanton SR-11	4
85	Kyle Craker	Tucker/Boat Motorsports	Spike	Speedway Toyota	1
85	McKenna Haase	Tucker/Boat Motorsports	Spike	Speedway Toyota	2
87	Colby Copeland	Tucker-Boat Motorsports	Spike	Speedway Toyota	1
88	Tyler Nelson	Tyler Nelson Racing	Spike	Stanton SR-11	2
88T	Tyler Nelson	Tyler Nelson Racing	Spike	Stanton SR-11	1
88w	Dustin Weland	Dustin Weland Racing	Spike	Fontana	2
89	Braydan Willmington	Team RayPro	Bullet by Spike	RayPro Mopar	1
89JR	Todd McVay	McVay			1
91	Tyler Nelson	Harris Racing	Spike	Fontana	1
91	Shane Cockrum	Harris Racing	Spike	Fontana	1
91	Daniel Robinson	Harris Racing	Spike	Fontana	1
91	Chris Sheil	Cappy Mason	Eagle	Mopar	1
91D	Dave Darland	Brian Thomas	Spike	Esslinger	1
91T	Tyler Thomas	Brian Thomas	Spike	Esslinger	12
92	Brenden Bright	Brenden Bright	STS	Esslinger	1
96	Chris Andrews	Miller Racing	Boss	Esslinger	1
96	John Anderika	John Anderika	Stealth	Gaerte Chevrolet	1
97	Spencer Bayston	Keith Kunz Motorsports - Curb-Agajanian	Bullet by Spike	Speedway Toyota	15
97	Maria Cofer	Keith Kunz Motorsports - Curb-Agajanian	Bullet by Spike	Speedway Toyota	1
97	Rico Abreu	Keith Kunz Motorsports - Curb-Agajanian	Bullet by Spike	Speedway Toyota	1
97A	Austin O'Dell	Pat O'Dell	Ripper by Jetson	Chevrolet	1
97F	Jesse Fernandez	Jesse Fernandez Racing	Triple X	McCabe Gaerte	2
97K	Spencer Bayston	Keith Kunz Motorsports - Curb-Agajanian	Bullet by Spike	Speedway Toyota	1
97K	Rico Abreu	Keith Kunz Motorsports - Curb-Agajanian	Bullet by Spike	Speedway Toyota	2
99	Colton Heath	Carla & Gaylon Stewart	Triple X	Esslinger	2
99p	Dillon Welch	Kami Ronk	Spike	Esslinger	1
99w	Korey Weyant	Jay Mounce	BOSS	Esslinger	1

=== Driver and team changes ===
- Dooling/Hayward Motorsports formed an alliance with Richard Childress Racing to team up for the 2018 season with entries in USAC's P1 Insurance National Midget Championship & AMSOIL National Sprint Car Championship. Originally it was slated that Brady Bacon would race for the championship in both Midget & Sprint Car series for the team. Tanner Thorson will also race for the team in select races. However, Bacon returned to the FMR Racing team for the 2018 Midget season. Thomas Meseurall raced for the team at DuQuoin and Kokomo. Kevin Thomas Jr. joined the team in May for select Midget & Sprint Car (winged & local non-wing) races.
- Petry-Goff Motorsports will run 2 full-time teams for the 2018 season. Jerry Coons Jr. will race full-time in the #25 car. Kevin Thomas Jr. & Jason McDougal so far have raced for the team in the #15 car.
- Leader Card Racers will return to the USAC National Midgets in a one-off entry in the BC39 race at Indianapolis Motor Speedway with Tracy Hines driving for the team.
- Monster Energy NASCAR Cup Series driver Landon Cassill will race a one-off entry for Brooke Shuman Motorsports in the Bell Racing sponsored #21x at the Driven2SaveLives BC39 at the Indianapolis Motor Speedway
- Chris Windom will race for Petry-Goff Motorsports in their #35 entry at the Driven2SaveLives BC39 at the Indianapolis Motor Speedway.

== Schedule ==
The entire season will have on-demand video coverage by Loudpedal.TV. Select races will be broadcast live online by Speed Shift TV. The Cushion will broadcast the race at BAPS. Eldora Speedway will broadcast the Four Crown Nationals on their website. NBCSN will broadcast a recap show of the BC39 at the Indianapolis Motor Speedway on a single-day delay.

No.	Date	Race title	Track	TV/Stream
1	March 10	Shamrock Classic	Southern Illinois Center, DuQuoin, IL	Speed Shift TV
2	April 13	Kokomo Grand Prix	Kokomo Speedway, Kokomo, IN	Speed Shift TV
≠	April 14	Kokomo Grand Prix	Kokomo Speedway, Kokomo, IN	Speed Shift TV
3	May 29	Indiana Midget Week	Montpelier Motor Speedway, Montpelier, IN	Speed Shift TV
≠	May 30	Indiana Midget Week	Gas City I-69 Speedway, Gas City, IN	
4	May 31	Indiana Midget Week	Lincoln Park Speedway, Putnamville, IN	
≠	June 1	Indiana Midget Week	Bloomington Speedway, Bloomington, IN	
5	June 2	Indiana Midget Week	Lawrenceburg Speedway, Lawrenceburg, IN	Speed Shift TV
6	June 3	Indiana Midget Week	Kokomo Speedway, Kokomo, IN	Speed Shift TV
7	July 10	Tuesday Night Thunder	Red Dirt Raceway, Meeker, OK	Speed Shift TV
8	July 11	Chad McDaniel Memorial	Solomon Valley Raceway, Beloit, KS	Speed Shift TV
≠	July 13	Riverside Chevrolet Midwest Midget Championship	Jefferson County Speedway, Fairbury, NE	
9	July 14	Riverside Chevrolet Midwest Midget Championship	Jefferson County Speedway, Fairbury, NE	Speed Shift TV
10	July 15	John Hinck Championship	Sweet Springs Motorsports Complex, Sweet Springs, MO	Speed Shift TV
≠	August 2	Pennsylvania Midget Week	Path Valley Speedway Park, Spring Run, PA	
≠	August 3	Pennsylvania Midget Week	Linda's Speedway, Jonestown, PA	
11	August 4	Pennsylvania Midget Week	Lanco's Clyde Martin Memorial Speedway, Newmanstown, PA	Speed Shift TV
12	August 5	Pennsylvania Midget Week	BAPS Motor Speedway, York Haven, PA	The Cushion
*	September 5	DrivenToSaveLives BC39	The Dirt Track at Indianapolis Motor Speedway, Speedway, IN	Speed Shift TV (live) NBCSN (delayed)
13	September 6	DrivenToSaveLives BC39	The Dirt Track at Indianapolis Motor Speedway, Speedway, IN	Speed Shift TV (live) NBCSN (delayed)
14	September 22	Four Crown Nationals	Eldora Speedway, Rossburg, OH	EldoraSpeedway.com
15	October 21	Jason Leffler Memorial	Wayne County Speedway, Wayne City, Illinois	
16	November 17		Bakersfield Speedway, Oildale, CA	Speed Shift TV
17	November 22	Turkey Night Grand Prix	Ventura Raceway, Ventura, CA	Speed Shift TV
*	December 14	Junior Knepper 55	Southern Illinois Center, DuQuoin, IL	Speed Shift TV

combination race with USAC Western States Midgets
combination race with USAC/ARDC Midgets
- - * will state if the race is a non points event, or a preliminary night.
- - ≠ will state if the race was postponed or canceled

=== Schedule notes and changes ===
- - Jason Leffler Memorial will return to Wayne County Speedway in Illinois on October 21. The return of the race was announced on July 15.
- - New venues on the schedule for 2018 include: Indianapolis (IMS Dirt Track), Red Dirt & Sweet Springs.
- - Venues from the 2017 season that aren't returning to the schedule in 2018 include: Belleville, Lincoln (IL), Macon, Springfield & Tri-City
- - Night #2 of the Kokomo Grand Prix at Kokomo Speedway (April 14) was canceled due to weather conditions.
- - Night #2 of Indiana Midget Week at Gas City I-69 Speedway (May 30) was rained out. The track & USAC are working on rescheduling the race.
- - Night #4 of Indiana Midget Week at Bloomington Speedway (June 1) was rained out. 12 of the 28 cars that were entered were able to make a qualifying attempt. The track & USAC are working on a possible reschedule date for this race.
- - USAC added an all new 2 night show at the all new Indianapolis Motor Speedway Dirt Track. The race will be called the BC39 (in honor of the late Bryan Clauson) and will feature the largest purse in Midget Car racing with $15,000 going to the race winner. The race will be held on the Wednesday & Thursday portions of the Brickyard 400 weekend.
- - Night #1 of Pennsylvania Midget Week at Path Valley Speedway Park (August 2) was canceled due to weather conditions.
- - Night #2 of Pennsylvania Midget Week at Linda's Speedway (August 3) was canceled due to weather conditions.

== Results and standings ==
=== Races ===
No.	Race / Track	Winning driver	Winning team	Hard Charger Award winner	B-main / Semi winners
1	Shamrock Classic	Logan Seavey	Keith Kunz Motorsports - Curb-Agajanian	Terry Babb	C.J. Leary Tony Roney
2	Kokomo Grand Prix - Night #1	Tyler Courtney	Clauson-Marshall Racing	Thomas Meseraull	Holly Shelton
3	Indiana Midget Week (Montpelier)	Kyle Larson	Keith Kunz Motorsports - Curb-Agajanian	Tyler Courtney	Logan Seavey
4	Indiana Midget Week (Putnamville)	Chad Boat	Tucker-Boat Motorsports	Ryan Robinson	Brady Bacon
5	Indiana Midget Week (Lawrenceburg)	Spencer Bayston	Keith Kunz Motorsports - Curb-Agajanian	Rico Abreu	-
6	Indiana Midget Week (Kokomo)	Kevin Thomas Jr.	Dooling-Hayward Motorsports with RCR	Chad Boat	Tanner Thorson
7	Red Dirt	Christopher Bell	Keith Kunz Motorsports - Curb-Agajanian	Tanner Carrick	Spencer Bayston
8	Chad McDaniel Memorial	Kevin Thomas Jr.	Dooling-Hayward Motorsports with RCR	Tucker Klaasmeyer	Tyler Courtney
9	Riverside Chevrolet Midwest Midget Championship	Justin Grant	Clauson-Marshall Racing	Brady Bacon	Maria Cofer
10	John Hinck Championship	Logan Seavey	Keith Kunz Motorsports - Curb-Agajanian	Spencer Bayston	Logan Seavey
11	Pennsylvania Midget Week (Lanco)	Zeb Wise	Clauson/Marshall Racing	Andrew Layser	-
12	Pennsylvania Midget Week (Susquehanna)	Chad Boat	Tucker/Boat Motorsports	Zeb Wise	-
*	Stoops Pursuit	Zeb Wise	Clauson-Marshall Racing	-	-
13	BC39	Brady Bacon	FMR Racing	Christopher Bell	-
14	Four Crown Nationals	Tyler Courtney	Clauson-Marshall Racing	Logan Seavey	-
15	Jason Leffler Memorial	Tyler Thomas	Brian Thomas	Jonathan Beason	Justin Grant
16	November Classic	Logan Seavey	Keith Kunz Motorsports - Curb-Agajanian	Jason McDougal	Chad Boat
17	Turkey Night Grand Prix	Christopher Bell	Keith Kunz Motorsports - Curb-Agajanian	Jerry Coons Jr.	Colby Copeland
*	Junior Knepper 55	Thomas Meseraull	RMS	Kevin Thomas Jr.	Chase Briscoe
*	Junior Knepper 55	Thomas Meseraull	RMS	Kevin Thomas Jr.	Thomas Chandler

== See also ==
- 2018 USAC AMSOIL National Sprint Car Championship
- 2018 USAC Silver Crown Series
