= 2018 USAC Silver Crown Series =

Racing season

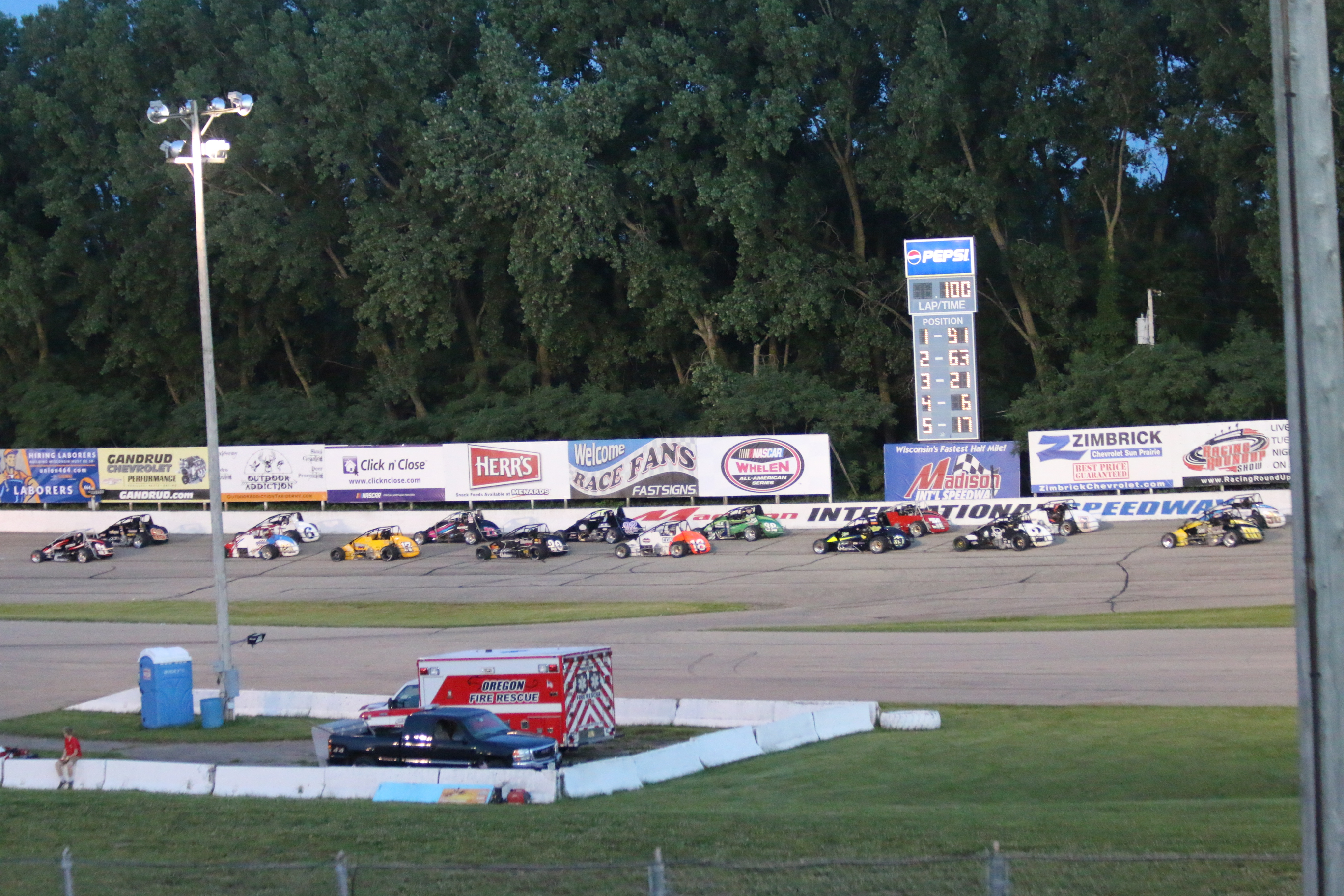
Most of the USAC Silver Crown field at Madison International Speedway

The 2018 USAC Silver Crown Champ Car Series is the 47th season of Silver Crown racing under the USAC banner. The series will begin with the Phoenix Copper Cup at ISM Raceway on April 7, and will end with the 4 Crown Nationals at Eldora Speedway on September 22. Kody Swanson entered the 2018 season as the defending champion. Swanson won the 2018 season title, becoming a 4-time series champion. Swanson also joined Al Unser as one of the only two drivers in history to win four consecutive Hoosier Hundred races in a row in 2018. Swanson also became the all-time wins leader in Silver Crown at Salem with 24 wins.

== Team & Driver Chart ==
No.	Race Driver	Car Owner / Entrant	Chassis	Engine	Rounds
2	Patrick Lawson	Patrick Lawson	DRC	Wesmar Chevrolet	6
3	A.J. Russell	Ted Finkenbinder	Beast	Bailey Bros. Chevrolet	1
4	Joe Liguori	Liguori Racing	DRC	Kercher Chevrolet	4
5	J.C. Bland	Bland Brothers Enterprises	Drinan	BBE Chevrolet	3
6	Kyle Hamilton	Klatt Enterprises	Beast	J&D Ford	5
6	Brady Bacon	Klatt Enterprises	Beast	J&D Ford	5
7	Kyle Robbins	Kyle Robbins Racing	Beast	Chevrolet	10
8	Johnny Petrozelle	Cornell-Petrozelle Racing	DRC	Stanton Toyota	3
9	Chris Dyson	Chris Dyson Racing	Beast	Kistler Chevrolet	4
9	Jason McDougal	Chris Dyson Racing	Beast	Kistler Chevrolet	1
02	Tanner Swanson	Bowman-Elmore Racing	Beast	Kistler Chevrolet	1
04	Neil Shepherd	Shepherd Racing	DRC	Claxton Toyota	3
07	Jacob Wilson	Wilson Brothers Racing	Maxim	Claxton Toyota Claxton Chevrolet	6
10	C.J. Leary	Mickey Meyer	DRC	J&D Chevrolet	2
12	Brian Tyler	Galas Motorsports	Beast	Galas Chevrolet	3
14	Ken Schrader	Dennis & Dave McQuinn	JR-1	Chevrolet	2
14	AJ Fike	Dennis & Dave McQuinn	JR-1	Chevrolet	1
16	Austin Nemire	Nemire-Lesko Racing	Beast	Mopar	9
16	Terry James	Dr. Jim Logan	Beast	Cadillac	1
17	Chris Windom	Nolen Racing	Beast	Tranter Chevrolet	10
17	Chris Windom	Nolen Racing	Maxim	Tranter Chevrolet	10
18	Travis Welpott	Travis Welpott-Ernie Goman Racing	DRC	Ed Pink Chevrolet	8
20	Jerry Coons Jr.	Nolen Racing	Beast	Tranter Chevrolet	10
20	Jerry Coons Jr.	Nolen Racing	Maxim	Tranter Chevrolet	10
21	Eric Gordon	Armstrong Racing	Beast	Claxton Toyota	5
21	Jeff Swindell	Swanson Racing	Maxim	Moyle Toyota	3
22	Bobby Santos III	DJ Racing	Beast	Speedway Chevrolet	5
23	Terry James	Todd Satterthwaite	Magnum	Chevrolet	2
24	Mike Haggenbottom	Haggenbottom Racing	Maxim	Speed Equipment Chevrolet	2
24	Keith Burch	Keith Burch	Beast	Burch Chevrolet	2
26	Aaron Pierce	Sam Pierce	Beast	Jackson Chevrolet	7
29	Brent Yarnal	Yarnal Racing			1
29	Joey Moughan	Joey Moughan	Maxim	Claxton Mopar	2
30	C.J. Leary	Chuck & Tammi Leary	DRC	1-Way Toyota	3
31	Dave Berkheimer	Berkheimer Racing	Drinan	Chevrolet	4
31	Derek Bischak	Derek Bischak	Beast	Gaerte Chevrolet	1
32	Joss Moffatt	Williams & Wright Racing	Maxim	Williams Chevrolet	1
32	Dave Darland	Williams & Wright Racing	Maxim	Williams Chevrolet	4
33	Jackie Burke	Jackie Burke	Shores-Burke	Chevrolet	2
34	Terry Babb	Ken Morford	Beast	Chevrolet	2
39	Matt Goodnight	Goodnight Racing	Beast	Claxton Chevrolet	10
40	David Byrne	Byrne Racing	Maxim	J&D Chevrolet	10
41	A.J. Fike	McQuinn Motorsports	JR-1	McQuinn Chevrolet	1
43	Daniel Robinson	A.J. Felker & Ricky Nix	Beast	Chevrolet	1
43	John Heydenreich	A.J. Felker & Ricky Nix	Beast	Chevrolet	1
43	Dave Darland	A.J. Felker & Ricky Nix	Beast	Chevrolet	1
44	Danny Long	Danny Long	Beast	Z-Man Chevrolet	2
47	Austin Mundie	Les Butler	Maxim	Kistler Chevrolet	4
51	Russ Gamester	Gamester Racing	GRP	Toyota	3
53	Steve Buckwalter	SET Racing	Beast	Foxco Chevrolet	4
53	Aaron Schuck	Five-Three			1
55	Casey Shuman	Patty Bateman	Beast	Foxco Chevrolet	2
56	Kevin Thomas Jr.	Foxco Racing	Eagle	Foxco Chevrolet	4
60	Cody Gerhardt	Cody Gerhardt	Beast	Toyota	3
63	Kody Swanson	DePalma Motorsports	Beast	Hampshire Chevrolet	10
66	Bill Rose	Bill Rose Racing	Beast	Claxton Toyota	5
66	Bill Rose	Bill Rose Racing	Beast	Claxton Mopar	5
71	Shane Cockrum	Hardy Boys Motorsports	Maxim	Brown Chevrolet	4
75	Dave Darland	Bill Rose Racing	Beast	Claxton Toyota	1
75	Bill Rose	Bill Rose Racing	Beast	Claxton Mopar	2
77	Chris Urish	Chris Urish	Beast	Foxco Chevrolet	2
80	Toni Breidinger	Breidinger Motorsports	Beast	Wesmar Chevrolet	5
81	Shane Cottle	Curtis Williams	Maxim	Williams Chevrolet	5
81	Cody Gallogly	Curtis Williams	Big Car	Williams Chevrolet	2
88	Chris Fetter	Sammy Fetter	Beast	Foxco Chevrolet	1
89	Chris Fetter	Chris Fetter	Beast	TMS Chevrolet	2
91	Justin Grant	Hemelgarn Racing	DRC	Speedway Ford	10
92	Jim Anderson	Kazmark Motorsports	Beast	Claxton Toyota	2
92	Dave Darland	Kazmark Motorsports	Maxim	Mopar	1
96	Austin Blair	Austin Blair Racing	Beast	Mopar	2
97	Tyler Courtney	Hans Lein	DRC	Stanton Mopar	5
99	Korey Weyant	Scott Weyant	Beast	Automotive Machine	4
114	Coleman Gulick	Team Scorpion	Mach-1	Jimmy D Chevrolet	2
118	Travis Welpott	Welpott Racing	Beast 1	Ed Pink Chevrolet	2
118	Travis Welpott	Welpott Racing	DRC 1	Ed Pink Chevrolet	2
124	Mike Haggenbottom	Haggenbottom Racing	Maxim	Speed Equipment Chevrolet	6
126	Jesse Dunham	Sam Pierce	Beast	Chevrolet	1
131	Derek Bischak	Derek Bischak	Beast	Gaerte Chevrolet	1
711	A.J. Fike	Hardy Boys Motorsports	Maxim	Brown Chevrolet	1

=== Driver & Team Changes ===
- - Chris Windom will run the full Silver Crown schedule in 2018 for Nolen Racing. Jerry Coons Jr., will also return to the team for the full season.
- - Austin Nemire will run the full Silver Crown schedule in 2018 for Nemire/Lesko Racing.

== Schedule ==
The 2018 schedule features 6 pavement races and 5 dirt races. The entire season will have on-demand video coverage by Loudpedal.TV. Select races will be broadcast live online by Speed Shift TV. Eldora Speedway will broadcast the 4 Crown Nationals live on their streaming website. Live radio coverage for most USAC National races is available on the USAC Racing App. BCSN would broadcast the Toledo race on delay. MavTV (in association with Speed51) would broadcast the Rich Vogler Classic at Lucas Oil Raceway on delay.

No.	Date	Race title	Track	TV/Stream
1	April 7	Phoenix Copper Cup	ISM Raceway, Avondale, AZ	
2	April 29	Sumar Classic	Terre Haute Action Track, Terre Haute, IN	Speed Shift TV
3	May 4	Rollie Beale Classic	Toledo Speedway, Toledo, OH	BCSN
4	May 24	Hoosier Hundred	Indiana State Fairgrounds Mile, Indianapoliis, IN	Speed Shift TV
5	May 25	Dave Steele Carb Night Classic	Lucas Oil Raceway at Indianapolis, Clermont, IN	Speed Shift TV
6	June 29	Bytech Dairyland 100	Madison International Speedway, Madison, WI	
7	August 11	Joe James - Pat O'Conner Classic	Salem Speedway, Salem, IN	
8	August 18	Bettenhausen 100	Illinois State Fairgrounds Racetrack, Springfield, IL	
9	September 2	Ted Horn 100	DuQuoin State Fairgrounds Racetrack, DuQuoin, IL	
≠	September 8	Rich Vogler Classic	Lucas Oil Raceway at Indianapolis, Clermont, IN	
10	September 22	4 Crown Nationals	Eldora Speedway, Rossburg, OH	EldoraSpeedway.com

Dirt oval
Pavement oval
- - * will state if the race is a non points event, or a preliminary night.
- - ≠ will state if the race was postponed or canceled

=== Schedule notes and changes ===
- - 1 new asphalt race was added at Madison International Speedway on June 29.
- - Williams Grove Speedway would not return to the schedule in 2018. However, this would be only a 1-year hiatus as the track & USAC intends on the race returning to the schedule in 2019.
- - Rich Vogler Classic (September 8) at Lucas Oil Raceway at Indianapolis was canceled due to inclement weather.

== Results and standings ==
=== Races ===
No.	Race / Track	Winning driver	Winning team	Pole position
1	Phoenix Copper Cup	Bobby Santos III	DJ Racing	Kody Swanson
2	Sumar Classic	Justin Grant	Hemelgarn Racing	Tyler Courtney
3	Rollie Beale Classic	Kody Swanson	DePalma Motorsports	Justin Grant
4	Hoosier Hundred	Kody Swanson	DePalma Motorsports	Kody Swanson
5	Dave Steele Carb Night Classic	Kody Swanson	DePalma Motorsports	Tanner Swanson
6	Bytech Dairyland 100	Kody Swanson	DePalma Motorsports	Justin Grant
7	Joe James - Pat O'Conner Classic	Kody Swanson	DePalma Motorsports	Kody Swanson
8	Bettenhausen 100	Chris Windom	Nolen Racing	Jerry Coons Jr.
9	Ted Horn 100	Chris Windom	Nolen Racing	Jacob Wilson
10	Four Crown Nationals	C.J. Leary	Chuck & Tammi Leary	Shane Cottle

=== Driver points ===
1. Kody Swanson, 641
2. Justin Grant, 559
3. Chris Windom, 524
4. David Byrne, 459
5. Jerry Coons Jr., 433
6. Kyle Robbins, 372
7. Travis Welpott, 348
8. Matt Goodnight, 344
9. Bobby Santos III, 329
10. Austin Nemire, 327

=== Owner points ===
1. #63 DePalma Motorsports, 641
2. #91 Hemelgarn Racing, 559
3. #17 Nolen Racing, 524
4. #40 Byrne Racing, 459
5. #20 Nolen Racing, 433

== See also ==
- 2018 USAC AMSOIL National Sprint Car Championship
- 2018 USAC P1 Insurance National Midget Championship
