= Brady Bacon =

American racecar driver (born 1990)

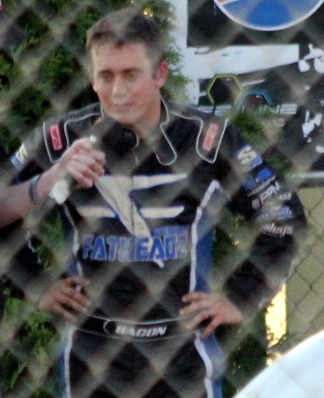
- Bacon being interviewed after winning his heat race in 2014
- Born: January 26, 1990 (age 36) Broken Arrow, Oklahoma, U.S.

USAC Sprint Car Series career
- Debut season: 2008
- Current team: Chris Dyson Racing
- Car number: 20
- Former teams: Kasey Kahne Racing; Brady Bacon Racing; TKH Motorsports; Hoffman Auto Racing
- Championships: 4
- Wins: 59
- Best finish: 1st in 2014, 2016, 2020, 2021

Championship titles
- 2014, 2016, 2020, 2021: USAC National Sprint Cars
- Statistics up to date as of February 14th, 2025.

Brady Bacon (born January 26, 1990) is an American racecar driver. Nicknamed 'Macho Man', he currently drives in the USAC Sprint Car Series. He won the 2014, 2016, 2020, and 2021 national championships. He previously had raced for Kasey Kahne and was a developmental driver for Chip Ganassi Racing.

== Racing career ==
Bacon is a third generation driver who started racing at the age of 4 and moved his way up the ranks. In 2005, Bacon was the National Modified Midget Association Nationals Champion and earned Rookie of the Year honors in the OCRS and SMRS. He was runner-up at the Knoxville Midget Nationals that year and won the Cornhusker Midget Challenge.

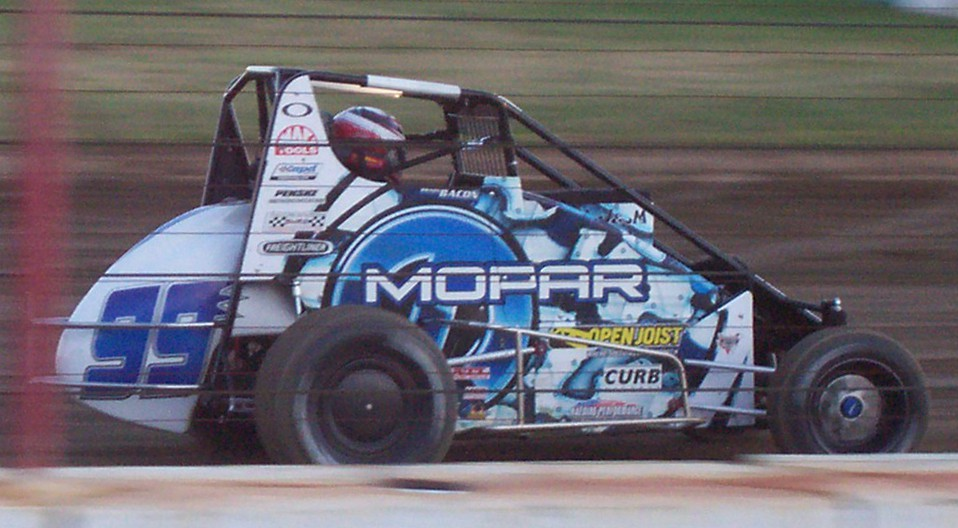
Bacon's 2008 USAC National Midget car

Bacon debuted in the USAC National Midget Car Series in 2006, scoring two straight second-place finishes in his first two events and seven top-ten finishes total in 11 races. He also tallied six top-ten finishes in ten USAC National Sprint Car events. That same year, he was the Southern Midget Racing Series champion and scored his first midget victory at Kokomo Speedway in Kokomo, Indiana. He signed with the Ganassi driver development program as well.

In 2007, Bacon was fourth in USAC National Sprint Car points and eighth in USAC National Midget points. He also finished fourth in Indiana Sprint Week and Indiana Midget Week points that year. He continued racing on both the national midget and sprint car toward for Kahne Racing until the end of 2008. He switched to the Mike and Megan Eubanks team starting in 2009 and mainly raced sprint cars in the American Sprint Car Series (ASCS) of 360 sprint cars. By 2011, he had won the rookie of the year for the Knoxville Nationals in a 410 sprint car and had a USAC National sprint car win.

Bacon took over ownership of the team in 2011 as Brady Bacon Racing. In 2012, he won twelve races including seven in ASCS action. In 2013, he married his girlfriend Xia Xianna Baker. That year he continued to race in selected events with his own team but mainly concentrated on racing in a 410 sprint for Hoffman Auto Racing. He finished third in the final USAC National Sprint Car points.

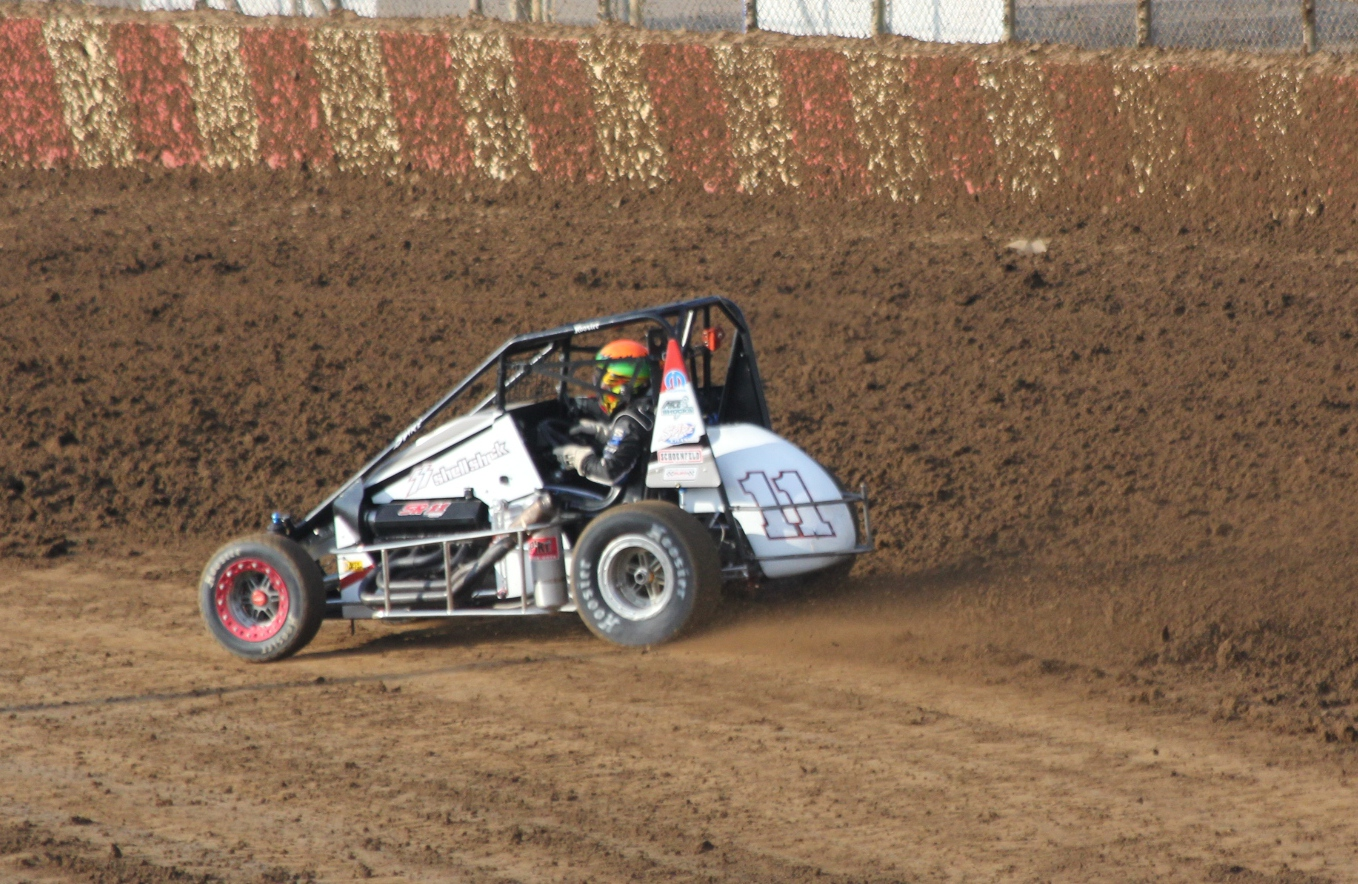
Bacon racing in a midget car in 2014

Bacon won the 2014 USAC National Sprint title. He won races at the open race at Bubba Raceway Park, Port Royal Speedway, Terre Haute Action Track, Eldora Speedway in the 32-race season.

In 2018, Bacon became the first-ever winner of a feature event at the Indianapolis Motor Speedway dirt track with a victory at the $15,000-to-win USAC Bryan Clauson Classic midget race.
