= Thomas Meseraull =

American auto racing driver (born 1981)

Thomas Michael "T-Mez" Meseraull (born 7 May 1981) is an American professional auto racing driver from Indiana. He races full time in the USAC National Midget Series. T-Mez was racing full-time with RMS Racing and As of the 30th of October 2023, RMS Racing announced that the team is parting ways with driver Thomas Meseraull after a five-year relationship with T-Mez and RMS Racing. He is a 19-time USAC National Series winner.

== Early life ==
Meseraull was born in San Jose, California.

== Career ==
Meseraull won the Bay Cities Racing Association (BCRA) Midget Championship in 2004.

Meseraull won his first USAC feature race in the Western States Midget division at Bakersfield Speedway in Bakersfield, California, in 2020.

Meseraull won the USAC NOS Energy Drink Midget Series Harvest Cup at Tri-State Speedway in 2020 and 2021 making him the first two-time USAC midget winner at the speedway since 1969.

In 2023, Meseraull was featured alongside Kyle Larson in the FOX Sports documentary Dirt: The Last Great American Sport.

== Personal life ==
Meseraull lives in Indiana.
