= Kokomo Speedway =

Dirt track

- Location: Kokomo, Indiana
- Coordinates: 40.5113°N 86.1434°W
- Operator: O'Connor Family (as of 2020)
- Opened: 1947
- Major events: Lucas Oil Late Model Dirt Series; World of Outlaws Sprint Cars; Sprint Car Smackdown; Kokomo Klash; Indiana Sprint Week venue (USAC Sprint Cars)
- Website: kokomospeedway.net
- Length: 0.25 mi (0.40 km)

Kokomo Speedway is a quarter mile (0.4 km) dirt semi-banked oval racing track in Kokomo, Indiana. The track hosts weekly Sunday night races during the American summer months. It has hosted or currently hosts national tours for sprint, late models, midget, and ARCA stock cars.

== History ==
When the track was built in 1947, it was designed for midget car racing. It was built by Albert Miller and John Rose. The track opened on July 6, 1947. The only winged USAC sprint car event in track history was held on June 23, 1991, and it was won by Kelly Kinser.

== Touring Series ==
The track is one of the venues for the Indiana Sprintweeks of USAC Sprint Cars. ESPN's Thunder show covered live Sprintweek races at the track in the 1990s. It currently holds events on the Lucas Oil Late Model Dirt Series and World of Outlaws Sprint Car series. It has held races in the ARCA Series, USAC Sprint Cars, and USAC National midgets. It holds the annual Kokomo Klash race with headline classes sprint cars, midget cars, late models, and modifieds in October.

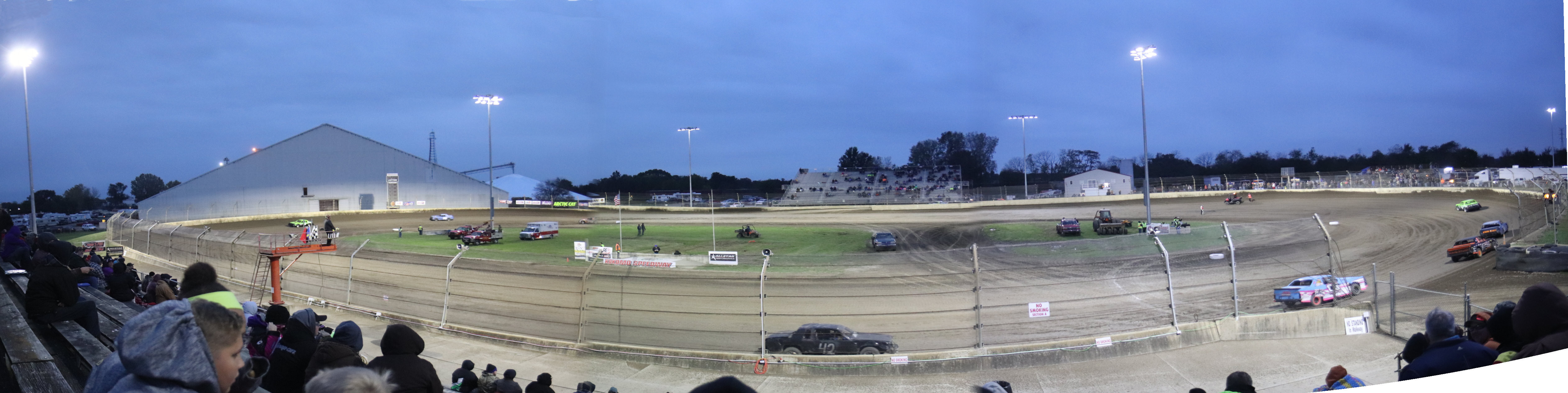
2018 panorama

== Notable alumni ==
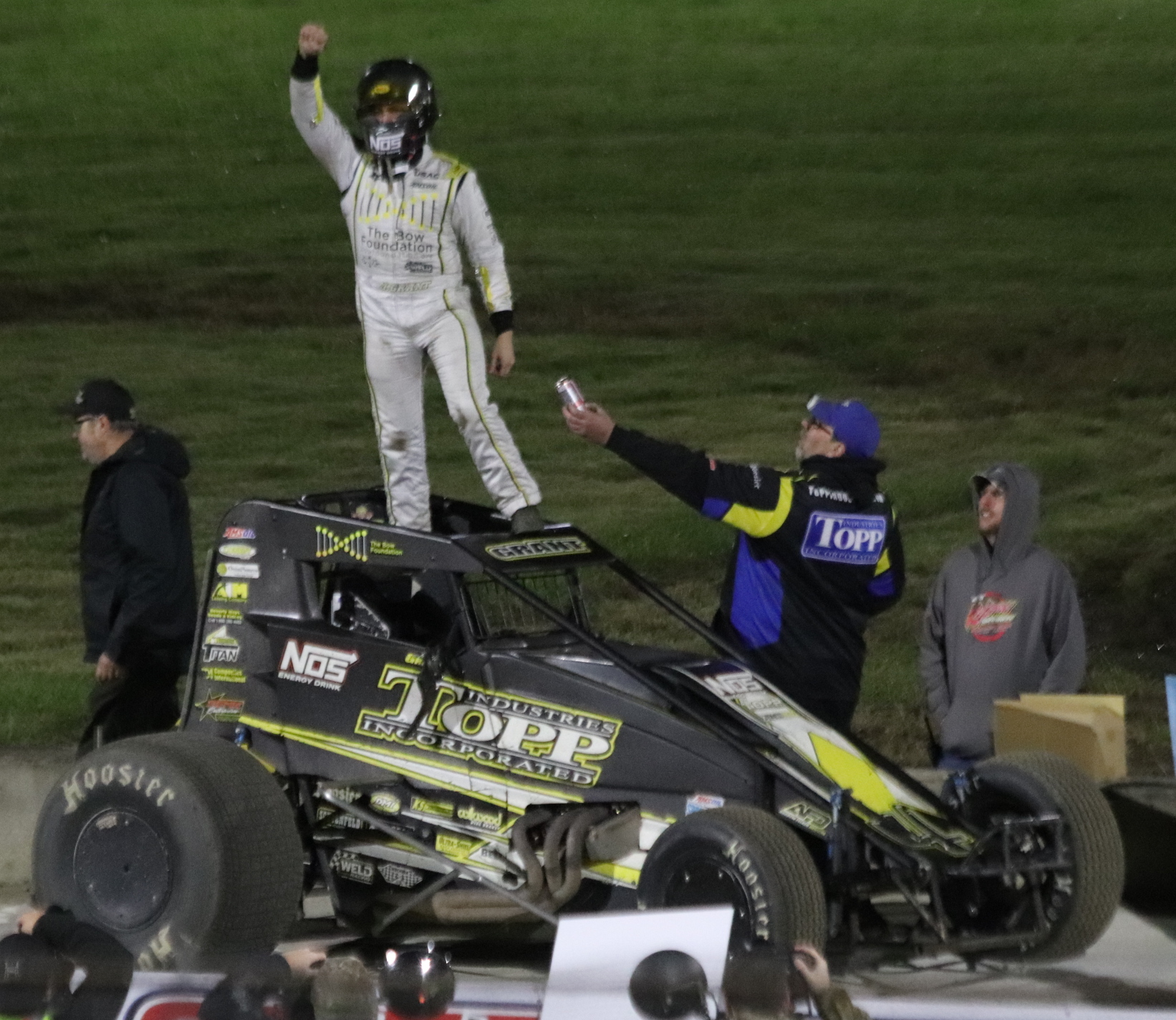
Justin Grant in victory lane at 2018 Kokomo Klash

- Bryan Clauson - 2014 Sprint Car track champion
- Dave Darland - 1987 / 1991 / 1993 / 1994 Sprint Car track champion
- Justin Grant - 2017 / 2019 Sprint Car track champion
- Cole Whitt - 2009 Sprint Car track champion
- Chris Windom - 2010 Sprint Car track champion

Bob Kinser - 1972-1976 & 1978-1980 Sprint Car track Champion

Shane Cottle - 2004, 2005, 2007, 2011 Sprint Car Track Champion

== Images ==
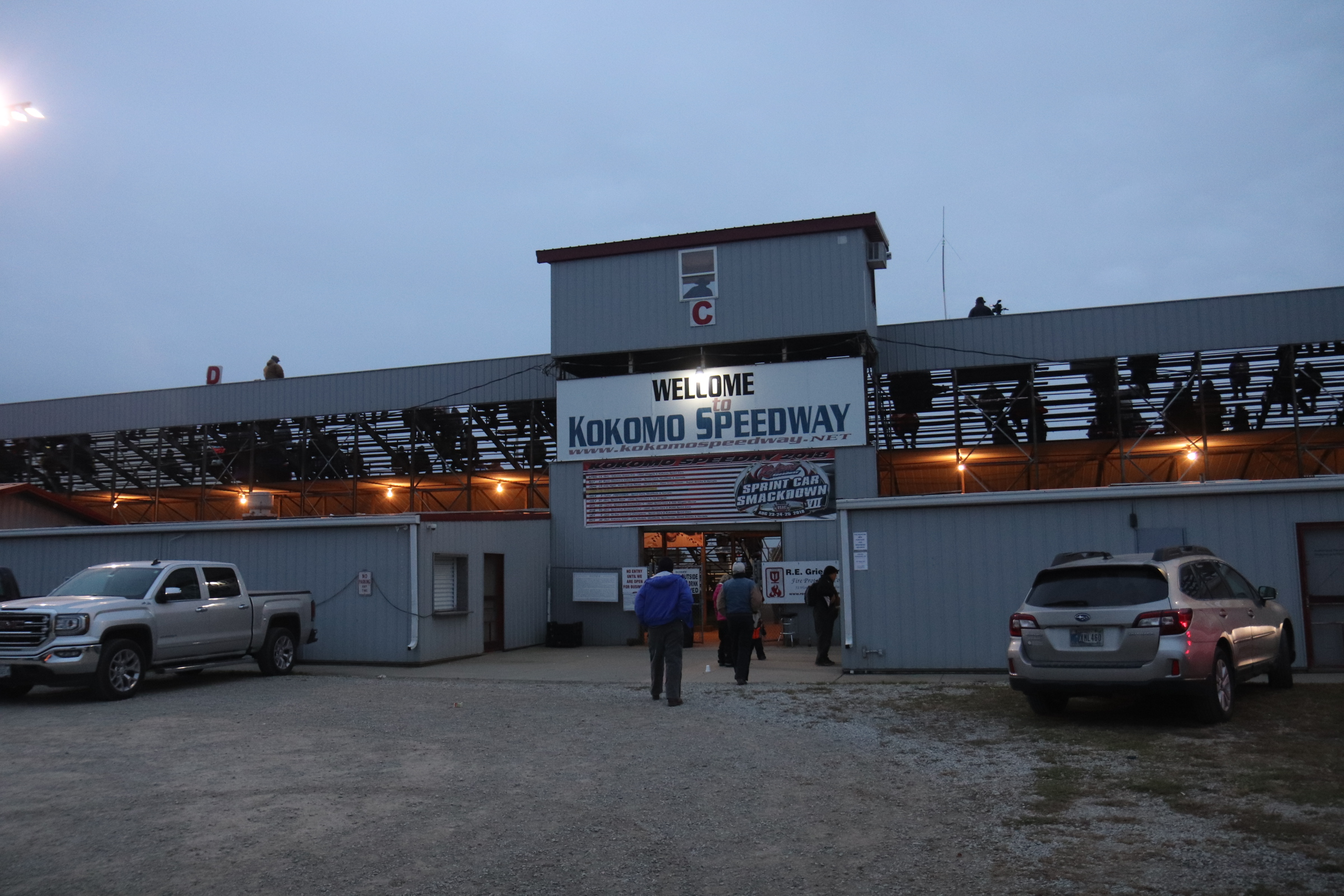
Entrance

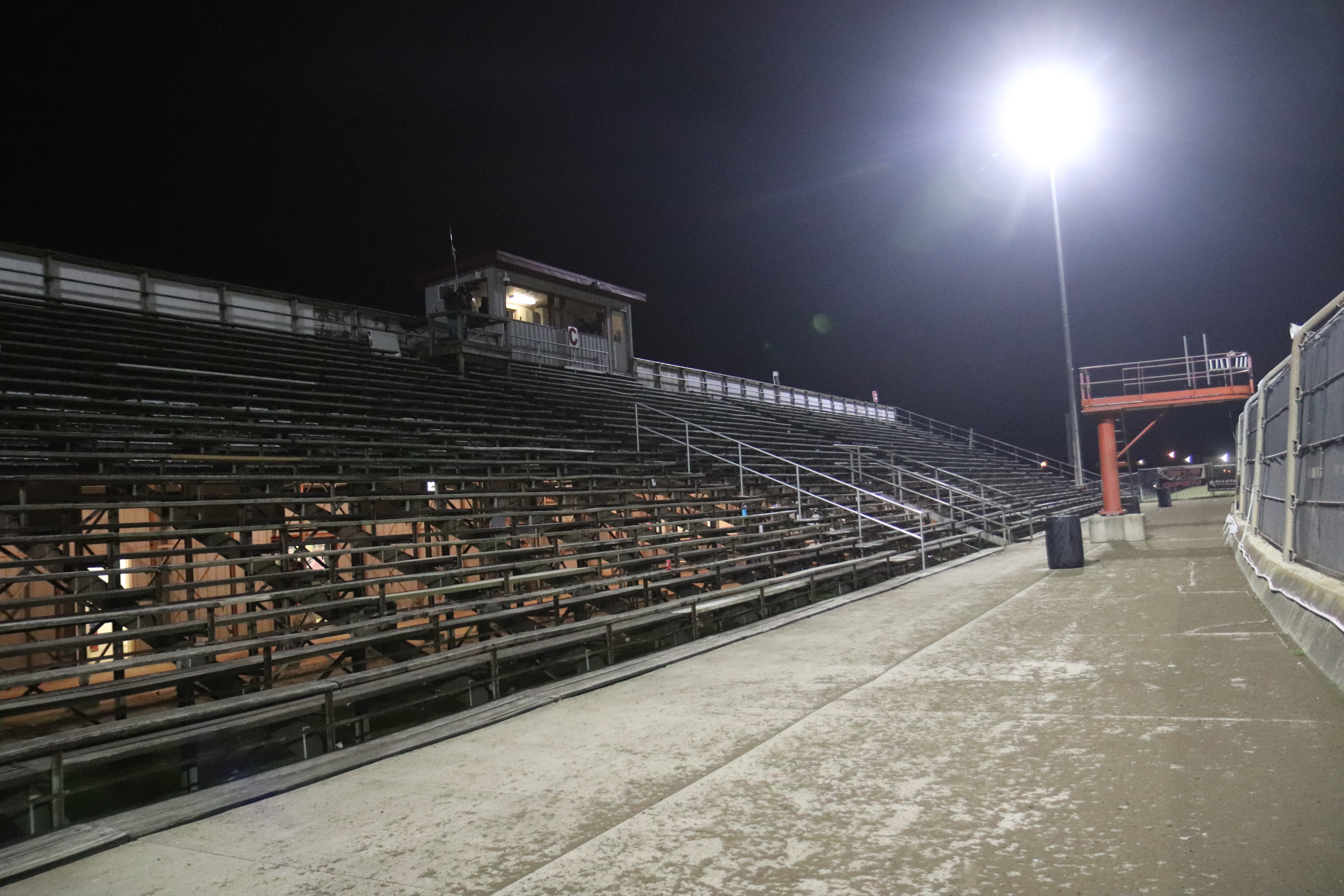
Grandstands

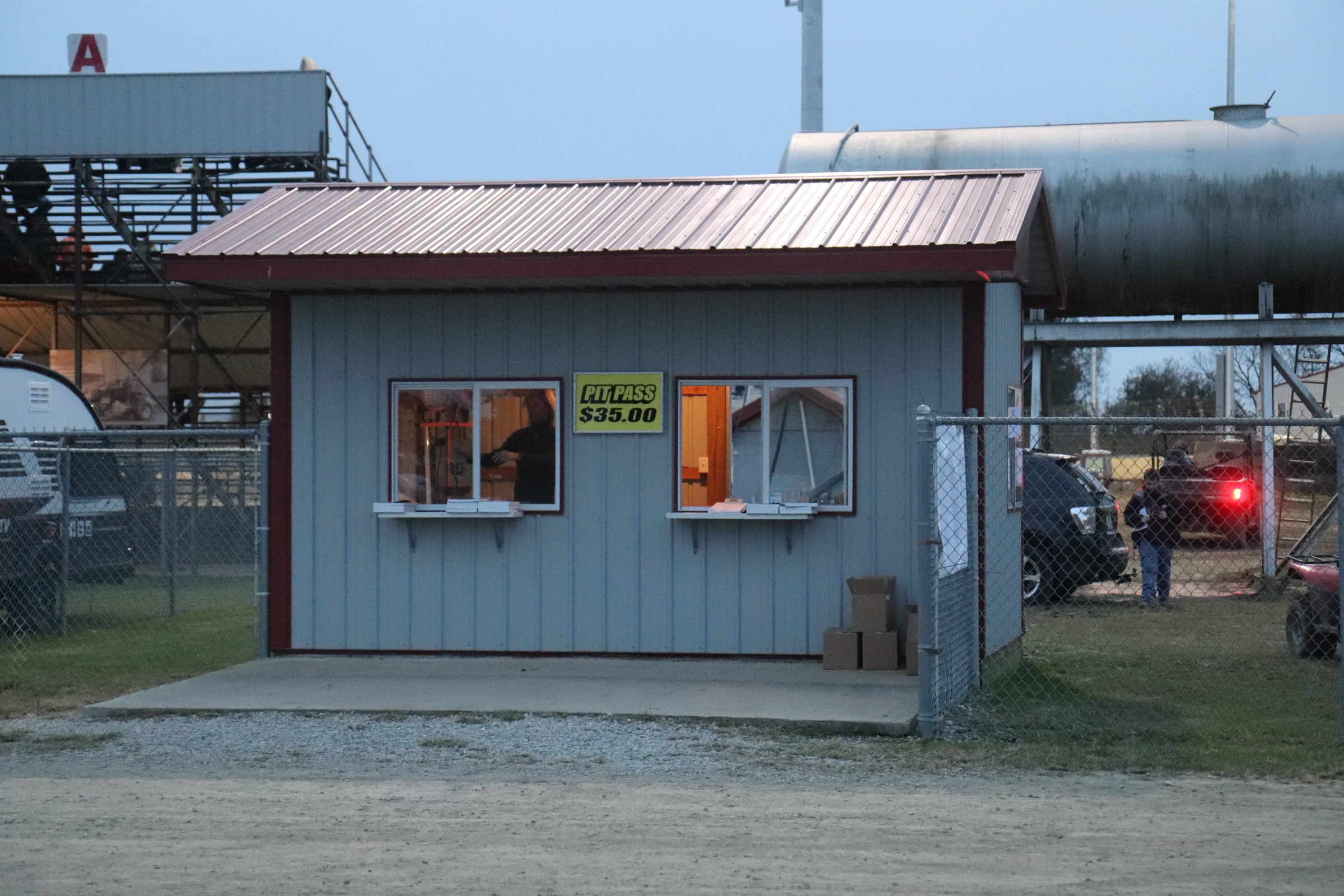
Ticket booth
