= Chris Windom =

American auto racing driver

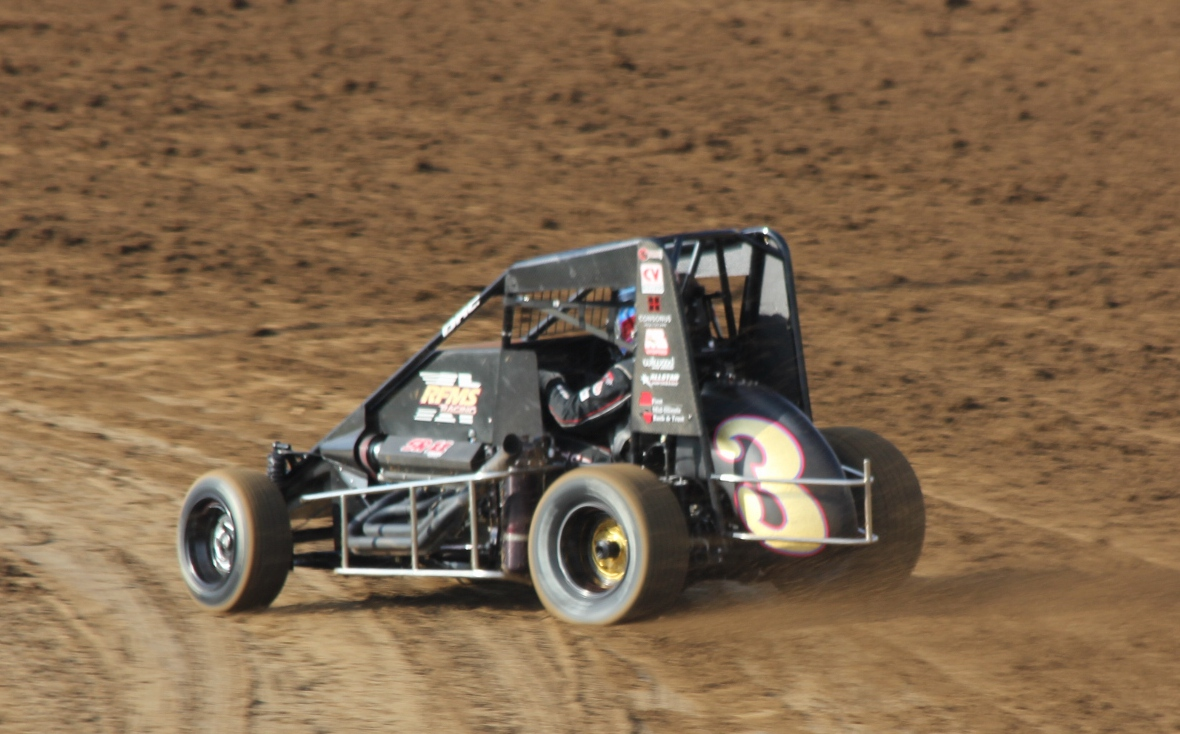
- Windom racing in a USAC Midget in 2014
- Born: Christopher Ryan Windom; December 24, 1990 (age 35); Canton, Illinois, U.S.
- Achievements: 2016 USAC Silver Crown Series Champion; 2017 USAC Sprint Car National Championship Champion; 2020 USAC National Midget Championship Champion; 2006 USSA Mel Kenyon Midget Series Champion; 2011, 2018 USAC Indiana Sprint Week Champion; 2017, 2018 USAC Eastern Storm Champion

NASCAR Cup Series career
- 1 race run over 1 year
- 2021 position: 37th
- Best finish: 37th (2021)
- First race: 2021 Food City Dirt Race (Bristol Dirt)
Wins	Top tens	Poles
0	0	0

NASCAR FedEx Freight Truck Series career
- 6 races run over 3 years
- 2021 position: 106th
- Best finish: 44th (2018)
- First race: 2017 Eldora Dirt Derby (Eldora)
- Last race: 2021 Corn Belt 150 (Knoxville)
Wins	Top tens	Poles
0	0	0
- Statistics up to date as of December 31, 2021.

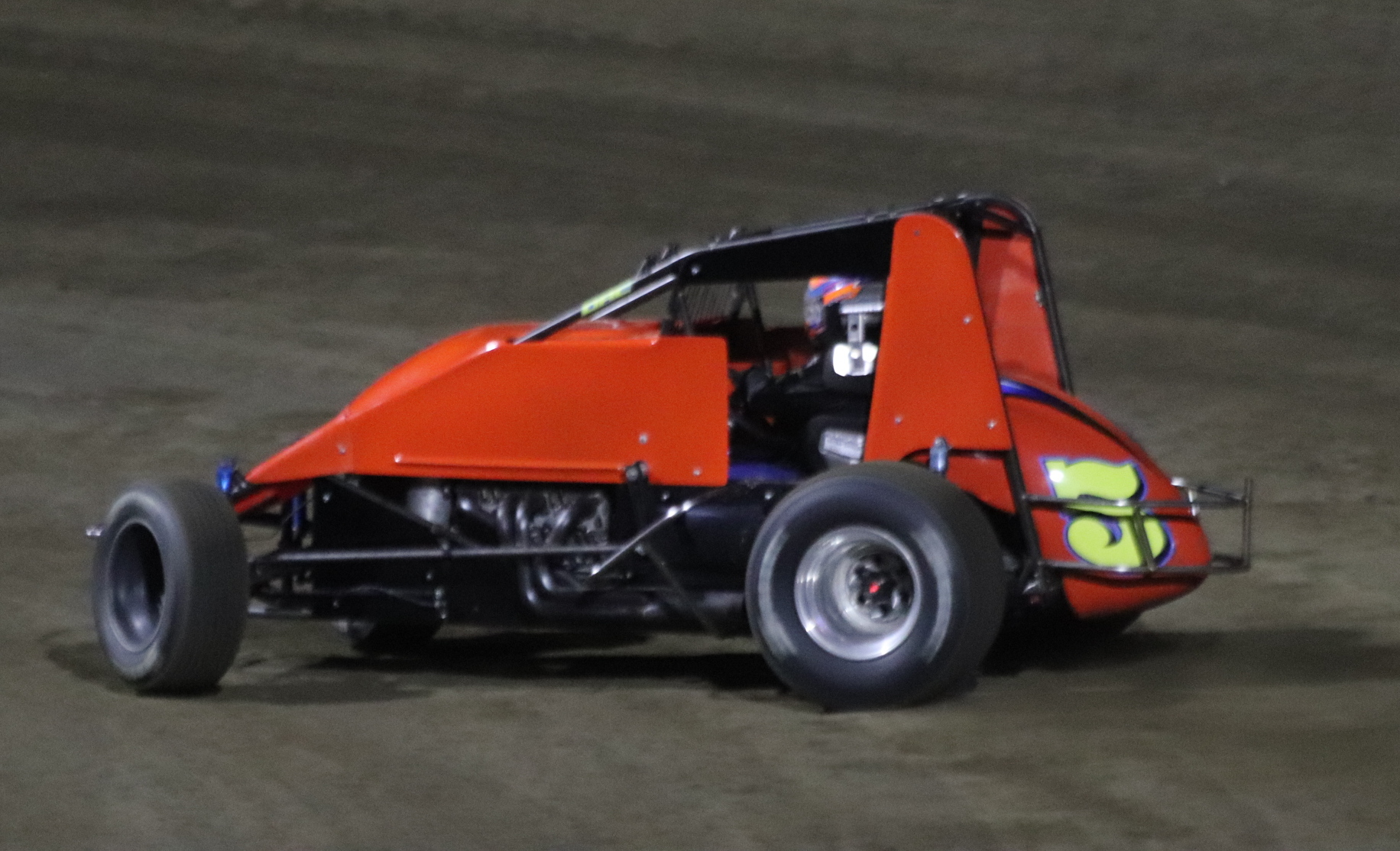
Windom's 2018 wingless sprint car at Kokomo Speedway

Christopher Ryan Windom (born December 24, 1990) is an American professional racing driver. Windom was the seventh driver to complete a United States Auto Club (USAC) Triple Crown by winning titles in sprint cars, midget cars, and Silver Crown.

== USAC ==
Windom won the 2017 USAC National Sprint Car Championship, the 2016 USAC Silver Crown Championship, and the 2020 National Midget Car championship. He is also a two-time Indiana Sprint Week (2011, 2018) and Eastern Storm (2017, 2018) champion, and a two-time winner of the Little 500 (2011, 2015).

== Stock car racing ==
Windom also participates in stock car racing, making seven starts from 2011 to 2015 in the ARCA Menards Series and three starts in the NASCAR Craftsman Truck Series in 2017 for MB Motorsports and one in 2018 for DGR-Crosley, with a best finish of fourteenth at Eldora Speedway. In 2021, he joined Rick Ware Racing for his NASCAR Cup Series debut at Bristol Motor Speedway's dirt event, where he finished 33rd after suffering an engine failure. He also ran the Corn Belt 150 at Knoxville in place of Michael Annett in the No. 02 for Young's Motorsports.

== Indy Lights ==
On March 27, 2018, it was announced that Windom would make his Indy Lights debut driving for Belardi Auto Racing in the Freedom 100 at the Indianapolis Motor Speedway with support from Jonathan Byrd's Racing, the same group that supported fellow sprint car driver Bryan Clauson venture into Indy Lights and the IndyCar Series. Windom, however, crashed during the first morning testing session on May 21 and the damage to the car forced Windom to withdraw from the event.

On April 16, 2019, it was announced that Windom would again attempt to make his Indy Lights debut in that year's Freedom 100 with Belardi Auto Racing and Jonathan Byrd's Racing. The day before the race, Windom suffered a massive crash during the Hoosier Hundred; however, Windom still decided to start the race. Unfortunately, Windom would experience another harrowing crash on the first lap of the Freedom 100 after he hit the spinning David Malukas and climbed atop the SAFER barrier. Neither driver was injured.

== Motorsports career results ==
=== NASCAR ===
(key) (Bold – Pole position awarded by qualifying time. Italics – Pole position earned by points standings or practice time. * – Most laps led.)

==== Cup Series ====
NASCAR Cup Series results
Year	Team	No.	Make	1	2	3	4	5	6	7	8	9	10	11	12	13	14	15	16	17	18	19	20	21	22	23	24	25	26	27	28	29	30	31	32	33	34	35	36	NCSC	Pts	Ref
2021	Rick Ware Racing	15	Chevy	DAY	DAY	HOM	LVS	PHO	ATL	BRD; 33	MAR	RCH	TAL	KAN	DAR	DOV	COA	CLT	SON	NSH	POC	POC	ROA	ATL	NHA	GLN	IND	MCH	DAY	DAR	RCH	BRI	LVS	TAL	ROV	TEX	KAN	MAR	PHO	37th	4	

==== Camping World Truck Series ====
NASCAR Camping World Truck Series results
Year	Team	No.	Make	1	2	3	4	5	6	7	8	9	10	11	12	13	14	15	16	17	18	19	20	21	22	23	NCWTC	Pts	Ref
2017	MB Motorsports	36	Chevy	DAY	ATL	MAR	KAN	CLT	DOV	TEX	GTW	IOW	KEN	ELD; 19	POC	MCH	BRI; DNQ	MSP	CHI	NHA	LVS	TAL					51st	34	
2017	MB Motorsports	63	Chevy																				MAR; 32	TEX	PHO	HOM; 26	51st	34	
2018	DGR-Crosley	54	Toyota	DAY	ATL	LVS	MAR	DOV	KAN	CLT	TEX	IOW	GTW	CHI	KEN	ELD; 14	POC	MCH	BRI	MSP	LVS	TAL	MAR	TEX	PHO	HOM; 24	44th	49	
2021	Young's Motorsports	02	Chevy	DAY	DAY	LVS	ATL	BRD	RCH	KAN	DAR	COA	CLT	TEX	NSH	POC	KNX; 15	GLN	GTW	DAR	BRI	LVS	TAL	MAR	PHO		106th	0^{1}	

^{*} Season still in progress
^{1} Ineligible for series points

=== ARCA Racing Series ===
(key) (Bold – Pole position awarded by qualifying time. Italics – Pole position earned by points standings or practice time. * – Most laps led.)

ARCA Racing Series results
Year	Team	No.	Make	1	2	3	4	5	6	7	8	9	10	11	12	13	14	15	16	17	18	19	20	21	ARSC	Pts	Ref
2011	Win-Tron Racing	32	Dodge	DAY	TAL	SLM	TOL	NJE	CHI	POC	MCH	WIN	BLN	IOW	IRP	POC	ISF; 3	MAD	DSF; 13	SLM	KAN	TOL			60th	380	
2012	Win-Tron Racing	32	Toyota	DAY; 8	MOB	SLM	TAL	TOL	ELK	POC	MCH	WIN	NJE	IOW	CHI	IRP	POC	BLN	ISF	MAD	SLM	DSF			72nd	295	
2012	Win-Tron Racing	32	Chevy																				KAN; 25		72nd	295	
2013	Roulo Brothers Racing	17	Ford	DAY	MOB	SLM	TAL	TOL	ELK	POC	MCH	ROA	WIN	CHI	NJE	POC	BLN	ISF; 6	MAD	DSF; 5	IOW	SLM	KEN	KAN	63rd	410	
2015	Lira Motorsports	36	Ford	DAY	MOB	NSH	SLM	TAL	TOL	NJE	POC	MCH	CHI	WIN	IOW	IRP	POC	BLN	ISF	DSF	SLM	KEN; 8	KAN		95th	190	

=== American open-wheel racing results ===
(key)

==== Indy Lights ====
Year	Team	1	2	3	4	5	6	7	8	9	10	11	12	13	14	15	16	17	18	Rank	Points
2019	Belardi Auto Racing w/ Jonathan Byrd's Racing	STP	STP	COA	COA	IMS	IMS	INDY; 10	RDA	RDA	TOR	TOR	MOH	MOH	GTW	POR	POR	LAG	LAG	13th	17
