= Rossburg, Ohio =

- Village
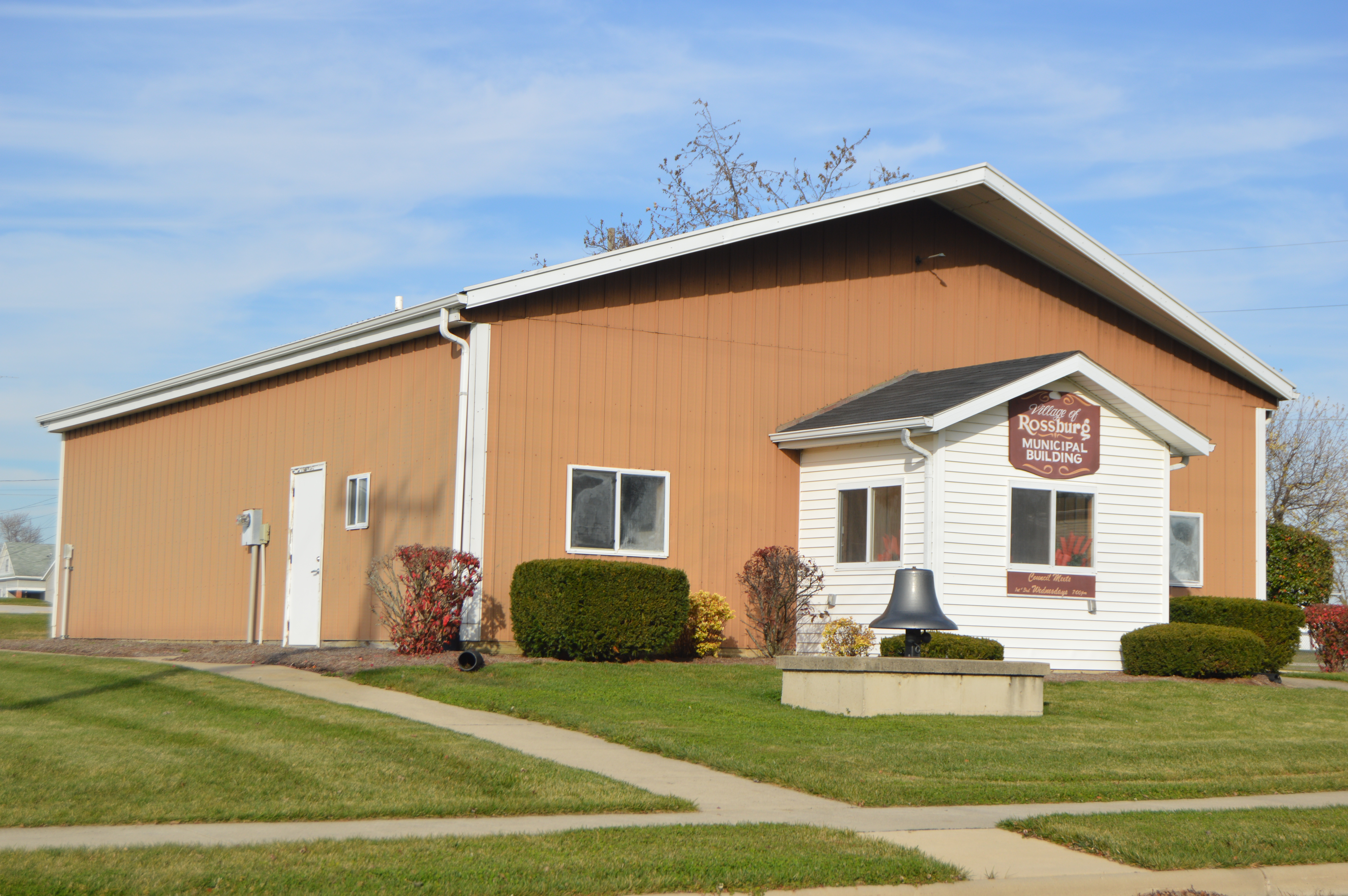
- Village Hall

- Location in Darke County and the state of Ohio
- Coordinates: 40°16′49″N 84°38′18″W
- Country: United States
- State: Ohio
- County: Darke
- Township: Allen

Area
  - Total: 0.14 sq mi (0.36 km^{2})
  - Land: 0.14 sq mi (0.36 km^{2})
  - Water: 0 sq mi (0.00 km^{2})
- Elevation: 1,040 ft (320 m)

Population (2020)
  - Total: 159
  - Density: 1,134.1/sq mi (437.86/km^{2})
- Time zone: UTC-5 (Eastern (EST))
  - Summer (DST): UTC-4 (EDT)
- ZIP codes: 45348, 45362
- Area codes: 937, 326
- FIPS code: 39-68672
- GNIS feature ID: 2399126

Rossburg is a village in Darke County, Ohio, United States. The population was 159 at the 2020 census.

== History ==
Rossburg was platted by John G. Ross in 1868. In its early years, the community was also known as "Hagerman"; under this name a post office was established in the community on December 19, 1883, and it operated under this name until November 4, 1905. The village was known as Rossville in 1881 to 1890. The village was very small until a period of growth began circa 1883, when a predecessor of the Cincinnati, Jackson and Mackinaw Railroad built a railroad line through Rossburg.

== Geography ==
According to the United States Census Bureau, the village has a total area of 0.14 square miles (0.36 km^{2}), all land.

== Demographics ==
Historical population
Census	Pop.	Note	%±
1890	254		—
1900	251		−1.2%
1910	261		4.0%
1920	246		−5.7%
1930	176		−28.5%
1940	204		15.9%
1950	203		−0.5%
1960	295		45.3%
1970	275		−6.8%
1980	260		−5.5%
1990	250		−3.8%
2000	224		−10.4%
2010	201		−10.3%
2020	159		−20.9%
U.S. Decennial Census

=== 2010 census ===
As of the census of 2010, there were 201 people, 77 households, and 58 families living in the village. The population density was 1,435.7 inhabitants per square mile (554.3/km^{2}). There were 81 housing units at an average density of 578.6 per square mile (223.4/km^{2}). The racial makeup of the village was 100.0% White. Hispanic or Latino of any race were 0.5% of the population.

There were 77 households, of which 32.5% had children under the age of 18 living with them, 57.1% were married couples living together, 9.1% had a female householder with no husband present, 9.1% had a male householder with no wife present, and 24.7% were non-families. 22.1% of all households were made up of individuals, and 14.3% had someone living alone who was 65 years of age or older. The average household size was 2.61 and the average family size was 3.03.

The median age in the village was 39.8 years. 22.4% of residents were under the age of 18; 9.5% were between the ages of 18 and 24; 27.5% were from 25 to 44; 30.5% were from 45 to 64; and 10.4% were 65 years of age or older. The gender makeup of the village was 50.7% male and 49.3% female.

=== 2000 census ===
As of the census of 2000, there were 224 people, 86 households, and 62 families living in the village. The population density was 1,600.2 inhabitants per square mile (617.8/km^{2}). There were 89 housing units at an average density of 635.8 per square mile (245.5/km^{2}). The racial makeup of the village was 99.11% White, 0.45% Native American, 0.45% from other races. Hispanic or Latino of any race were 0.45% of the population.

There were 86 households, out of which 31.4% had children under the age of 18 living with them, 58.1% were married couples living together, 5.8% had a female householder with no husband present, and 27.9% were non-families. 26.7% of all households were made up of individuals, and 11.6% had someone living alone who was 65 years of age or older. The average household size was 2.60 and the average family size was 3.16.

In the village, the population was spread out, with 26.8% under the age of 18, 11.2% from 18 to 24, 28.1% from 25 to 44, 22.8% from 45 to 64, and 11.2% who were 65 years of age or older. The median age was 36 years. For every 100 females there were 89.8 males. For every 100 females age 18 and over, there were 100.0 males.

The median income for a household in the village was $30,583, and the median income for a family was $43,125. Males had a median income of $30,833 versus $18,906 for females. The per capita income for the village was $16,376. About 3.5% of families and 4.3% of the population were below the poverty line, including none of those under the age of eighteen and 5.6% of those 65 or over.

== Sports ==
North of Rossburg in New Weston is the Eldora Speedway, a dirt track that currently hosts the World 100 Late Model race, as well as the World of Outlaws Sprint Car Series' Kings Royal, the track also previously hosted the NASCAR Gander Outdoors Truck Series' Eldora Dirt Derby from 2013 to 2019.
