= Dave Darland =

American racing driver

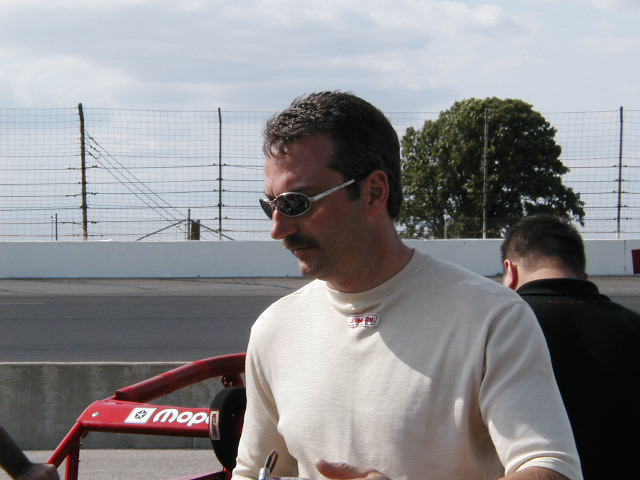
- Darland in 2003 at Indianapolis Raceway Park
- Full name: David Lee Darland
- Born: September 4, 1966 (age 60) Lincoln, Indiana, U.S.
- Retired: 2023

USAC National Sprint CarSeries
- Years active: 1986–2023
- Teams: Hoffman
- Starts: 1,334
- Wins: 62
- Poles: 3
- Best finish: 1st in 1993 (2), 1994, 1997, 1998 (4), 1999 (4), 2000 (3), 2001, 2005 (4), 2006 (3), 2007 (3), 2008 (2), 2009 (4), 2010, 2011, 2012 (6), 2013 (7), 2014 (6), 2015 (4), 2016 (2), 2018 (3)

Championship titles
- 1997 1998 1999 2001 2001 2002 2007 2008 2011: USAC Silver Crown Series; USAC Indiana Sprint Week; USAC National Sprint CarSeries; USAC Indiana Sprint Week; USAC National Midget Series; USAC National Midget Series; USAC Indiana Sprint Week; Sprint Bandits; King of Indiana Sprint Series

Awards
- 1994 1995 1997 1999 2015 2015 2017: HARF Driver of the Year; USAC Silver Crown Series Most Improved Driver; HARF Co-Driver of the Year; HARF Driver of the Year; Mike Curb Super License Award; Thomas J. Schmeh Award for Outstanding Contribution to the Sport; National Sprint Car Hall of Fame inductee

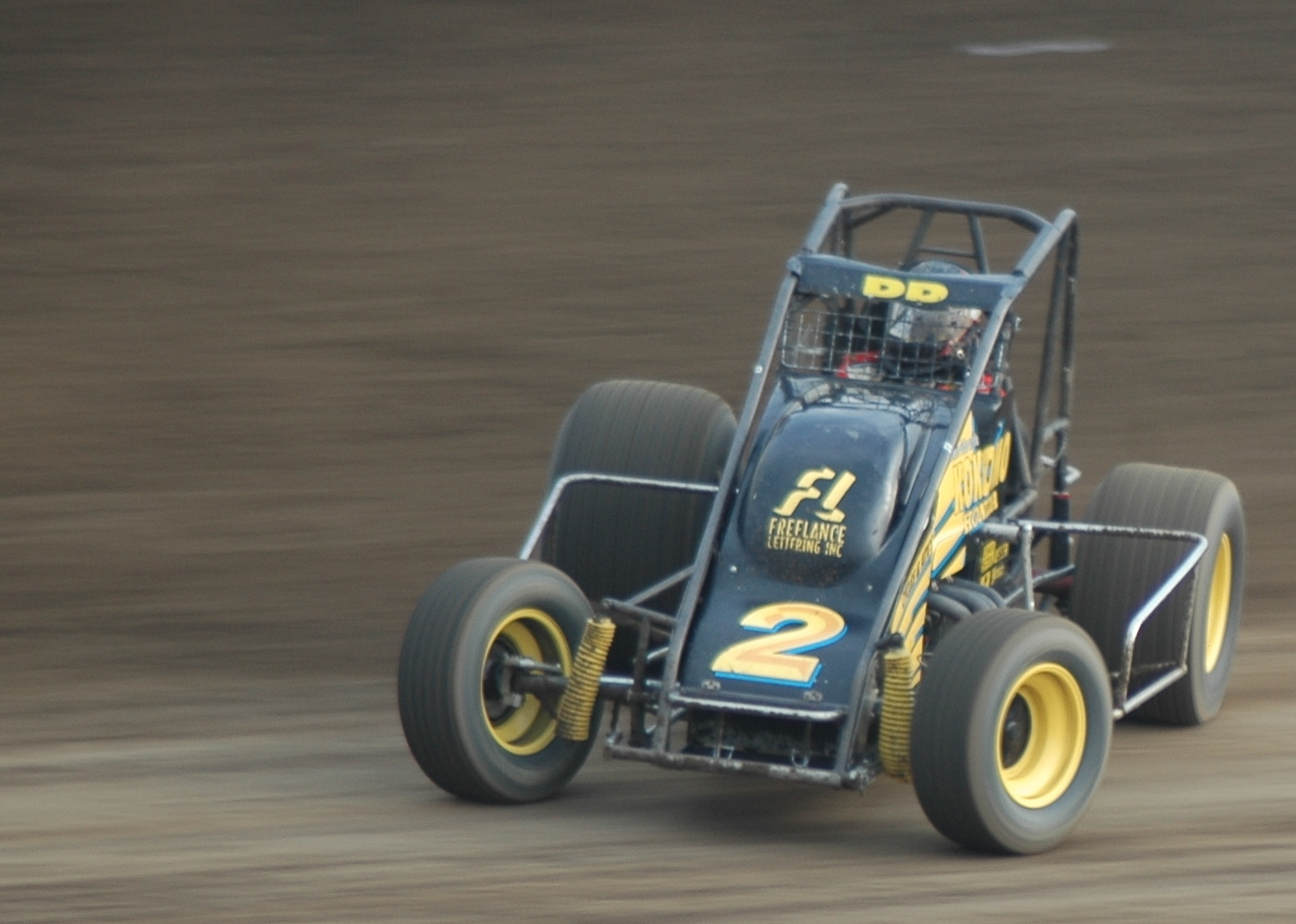
Darland racing at Kokomo Speedway in 2007

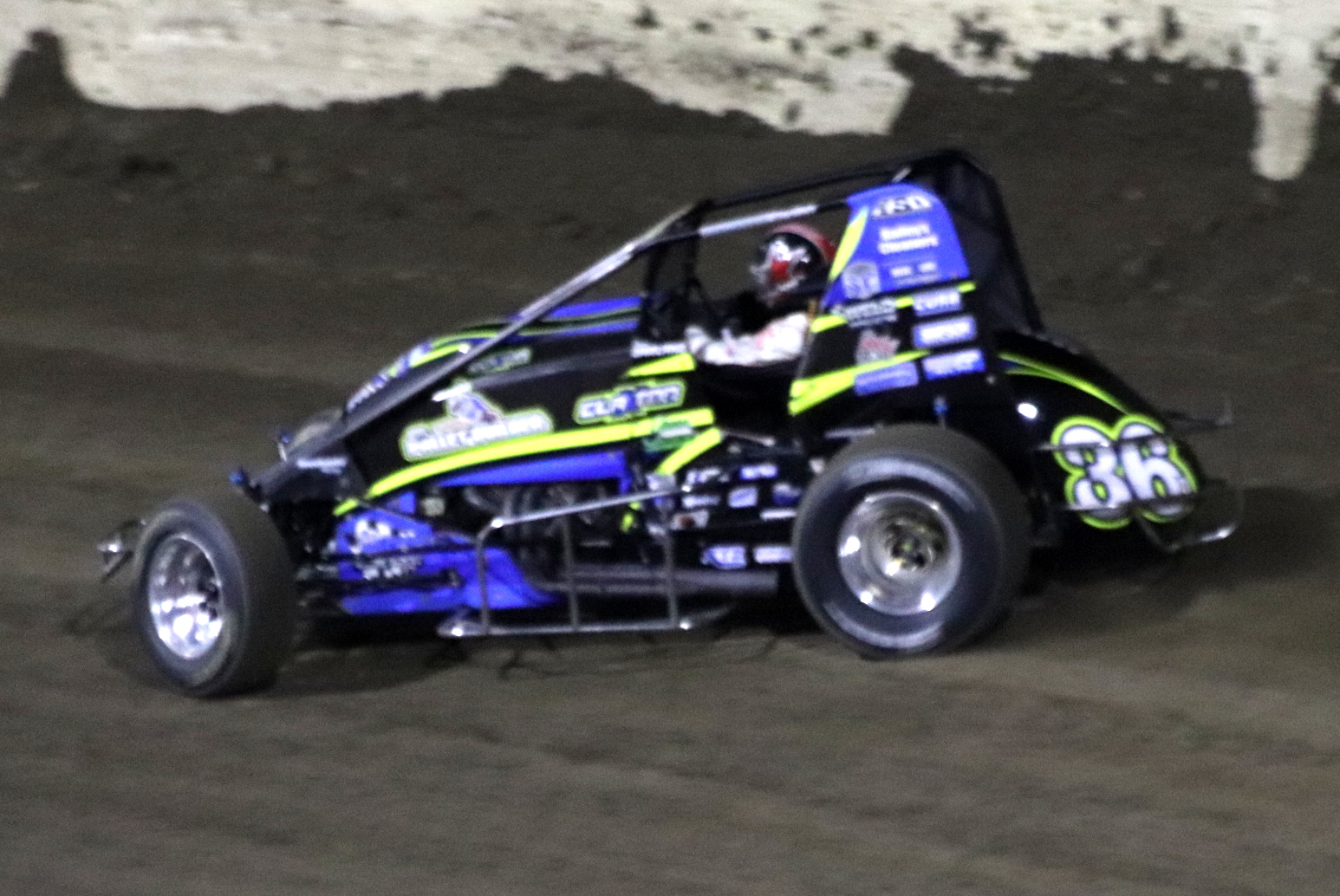
Darland's Sprint Car at Kokomo in 2018

David Lee Darland (born September 4, 1966) is an American former auto racing driver from Kokomo, Indiana. He was the 1997 USAC Silver Crown Champion, 1999 USAC National Sprint Car Champion, and 2001 and 2002 USAC National Midget Champion, making him the third driver to claim all three USAC National Championships. He is nicknamed "the People's Champ".

== Background ==
Darland was born and raised in Lincoln, Indiana. His father was a steelworker and his mother was a housewife.

== Racing career ==
Darland began racing quarter midgets when he was four years old. His father Bob Darland helped build his first sprint car when he was 16 years old. Darland's first sprint car win happened at Kokomo Speedway when he beat Steve Kinser's father Bob in 1986. Darland won over 100 features in his own sprint car.

Darland's first USAC feature win came in 1993 when he was 26 years old. Darland won the 2001 and 2002 USAC National Midget championships. Race wins include the 2007 & 2013 Turkey Night Grand Prix, a Southern California traditional race held on Thanksgiving Day for many years, and three wins at the Oval Nationals, held at Perris Auto Speedway in Perris, California.

As of July 25, 2020, his 20 Indiana Sprint Week race wins are the most in the series history (since 1988). As of September 26, 2020, he is the winningest driver in USAC Sprint Car history. Darland took over as the winningest USAC overall driver (in either midgets, sprint cars, and Silver Crown cars) when he passed Tom Bigelow's 52 total wins in 2014.

Darland retired from racing in 2023.

== Personal life ==
Darland and his wife Brenda have three children. He suffered a mild stroke on April 23, 2021, and was hospitalized with some confusion.

== Awards ==
- 2017 National Sprint Car Hall of Fame inductee
- 2015 Thomas J. Schmeh Award for Outstanding Contribution to the Sport
- 2015 Mike Curb Super License Award
- 2011 Won the King of Indiana Sprint Series title
- 2008 Won The Bob Darland Memorial Race in honor of his father.
- 2007 Indiana Sprintweek Champion
- 2002 USAC National Midget Series Champion
- 2001 USAC National Midget Series Champion
- 2001 Indiana Sprintweek Champion
- 1999 USAC National Sprint Car Series Champion
- 1999 HARF "Driver of the Year"
- 1997 USAC Silver Crown Series Champion
- 1997 HARF Co-"Driver of the Year" with Tony Stewart
- 1995 USAC Silver Crown Series "Most Improved Driver"
- 1994 HARF "Driver of the Year"
