= Mopar =

Parts, service and customer care organization within Stellantis

- Type: Division
- Industry: Automotive
- Founded: 1937; 89 years ago
- Headquarters: United States
- Area served: Global
- Products: Automotive parts
- Brands: Chrysler, Dodge, Jeep, Ram, Fiat, Fiat Professional, Abarth, Alfa Romeo, Lancia, Peugeot, Citroën, DS Automobiles, Opel/Vauxhall, Plymouth, Imperial, DeSoto, Fargo, AMC, Eagle (some no longer utilized)
- Parent: Stellantis North America
- Website: mopar.com

Mopar (a portmanteau of "motor" and "parts") is an American car parts, service, and customer care division of the former Chrysler Corporation, now owned by Netherlands-based automobile manufacturer Stellantis. It serves as a primary OEM accessory seller for Stellantis companies under the Mopar brand. "Mopar" is also commonly used by automotive enthusiasts as a metonym for Chrysler, and for vehicles sold by its divisions.

Mopar also designs and builds a small number of customized vehicles.

== History ==
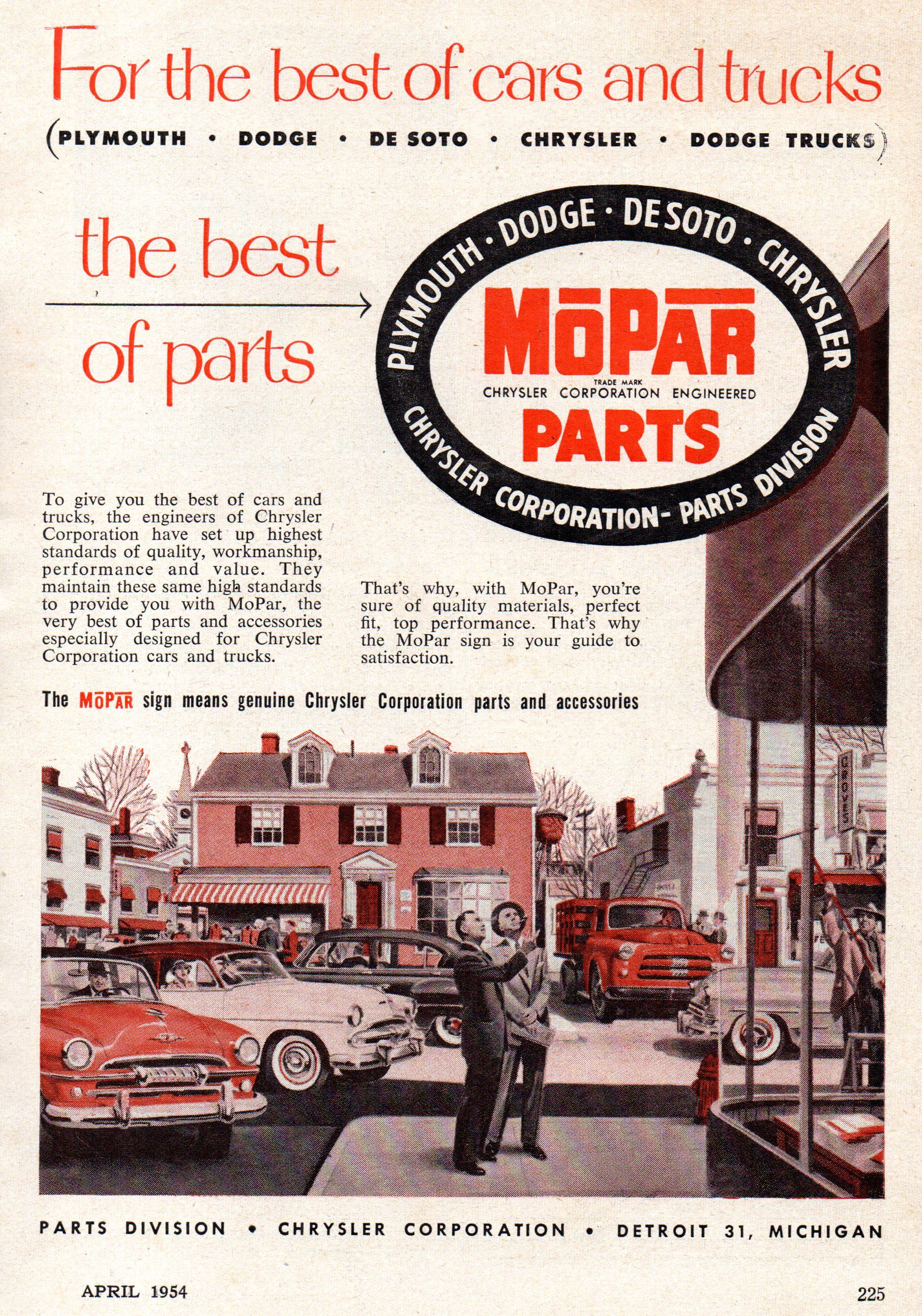
Mopar Parts magazine advertisement from 1954

An internal activities council created the term and was first used by Chrysler in 1937 as a product name to put on cans of Chrysler Motor Parts Antifreeze. This new branded product became known as "MoPar antifreeze", a portmanteau of the terms "motor" and "parts".

Mopar parts are original equipment manufactured parts for Stellantis global vehicles. The term "Mopar" has passed into broader usage among car enthusiasts as an unambiguous reference to vehicles produced by former parent company Chrysler Corporation/Chrysler Group LLC/FCA US LLC, now known as Stellantis.

The term has thus become an inclusive term for any Chrysler-built vehicle — almost any Dodge, Chrysler, Plymouth, Imperial, DeSoto, Fargo (Canada-only in later years), or Dodge Trucks/Ram. By extension, it is also used for Jeep and AMC vehicles built after Chrysler's 1987 buyout of American Motors Corporation, including the short-lived Eagle brand. The brand serves as Stellantis' global name for genuine parts and accessories. Its services now extend to the full range of Stellantis brands, adding Peugeot, Opel, Vauxhall, Citroen, and DS Automobiles to its OEM parts lineup, as well as the Chinese brand Leapmotor through Stellantis' 51-49 Leapmotor International J.V.

In Canada, Chrysler parts were sold under the "Chryco" and "AutoPar" brands until the Mopar brand was introduced in the late 1970s.

== Custom cars ==
Mopar does not have dedicated assembly lines. There are 13 Mopar Custom Shops that install customer-chosen accessories on their vehicles before delivery.

There are also limited-edition Mopar versions of Stellantis vehicles. These are marketed featuring custom paint and equipped with numerous Mopar performance and cosmetic modifications.

An example was the 2013 Dodge Dart finished in black with an offset Mopar Blue racing stripe, featuring sport-tuned steering, exhaust, premium brakes with slotted rotors, a lowered sport suspension, and gloss-black 18-inch aluminum wheels with low-profile performance tires. The Dart had production plans for 500 units.

A special edition Mopar 2017 Dodge Challenger was introduced at the 2017 Chicago Auto Show as part of the 80th anniversary of the Mopar brand. A total of 160 were built: half were finished in "contusion blue" with "pitch black" effects, and the second half in "billet silver" with "pitch black" accents.

== Sponsorship ==
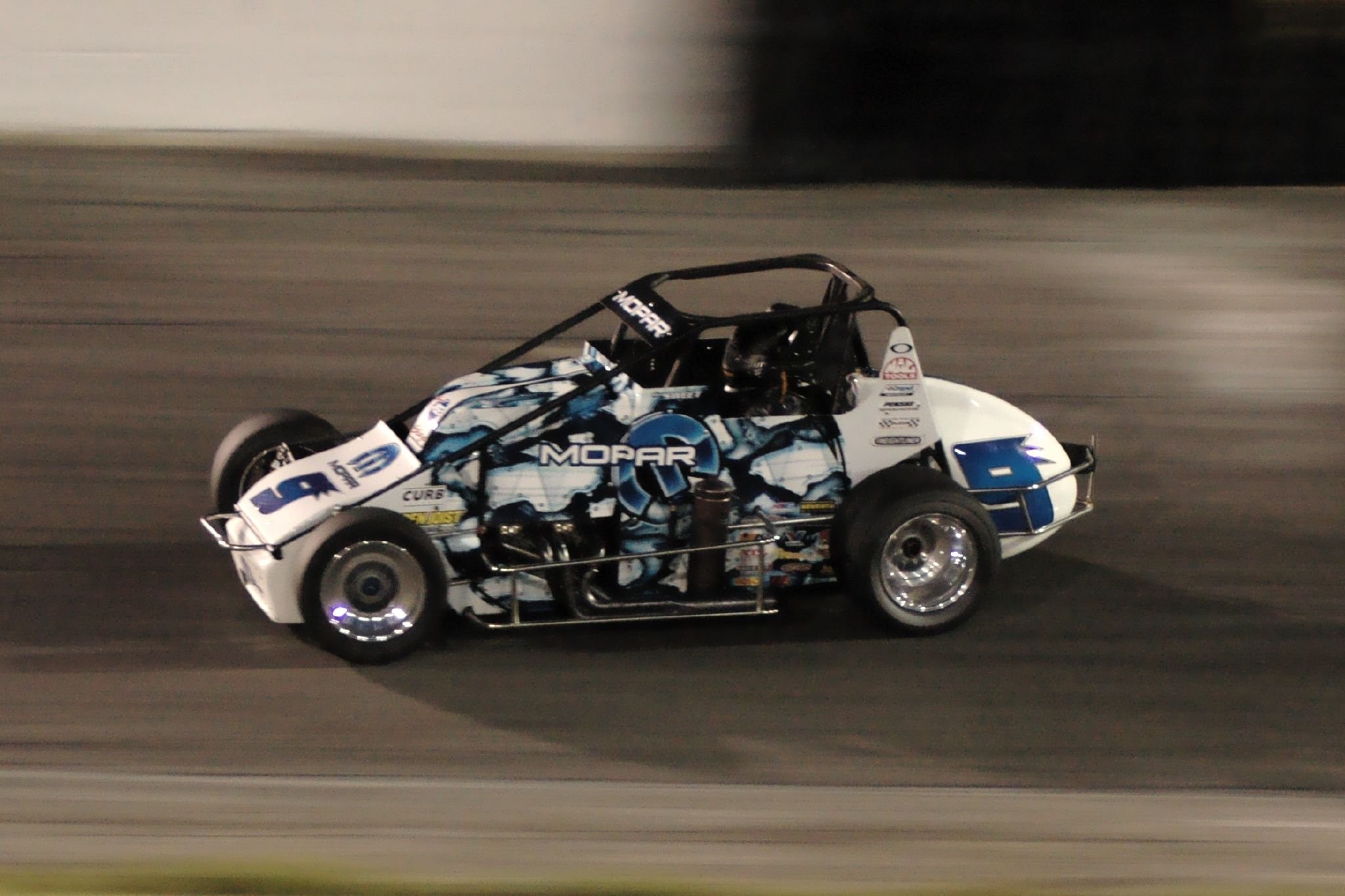
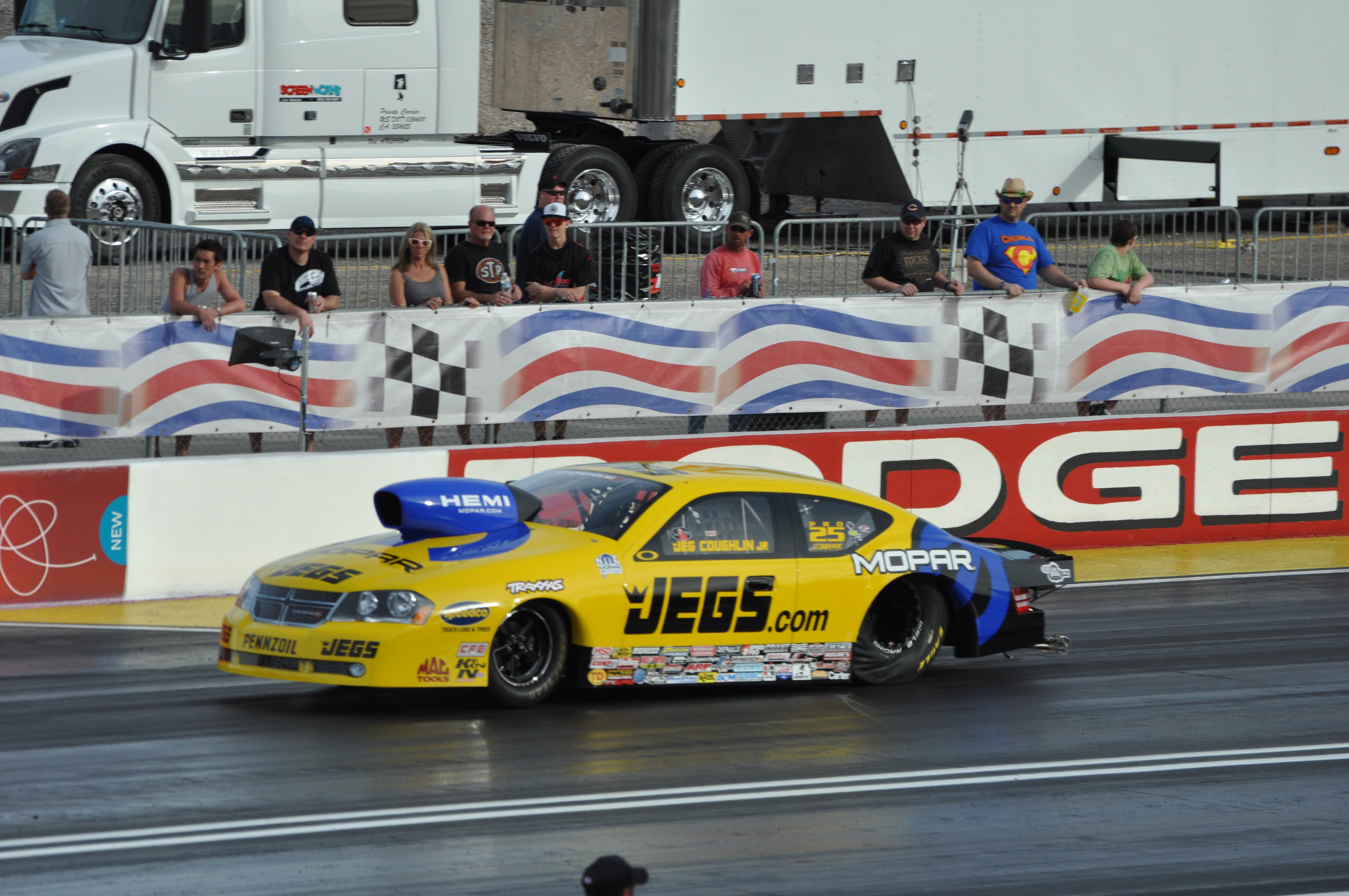
Two examples of Mopar sponsorships: sprint car racing (left) and drag racing (right)

Over its 80 years, Mopar has sponsored racers across a variety of motorsports series.

In 1996, Mopar sponsored the No. 30 car of Jimmy Hensley in the NASCAR Craftsman Truck Series. From 2004 to 2007, Mopar sponsored the No. 9 car driven by Kasey Kahne in the Nextel Cup Series for the Bank of America 500 at Charlotte Motor Speedway. They also sponsored his sprint car.

In the United States and Canada, Mopar participates in Formula D. Formula Drift drivers are Samuel Hübinette, and in the Canadian Drift Championship Vanessa Ozawa, Kevin Huynh, and John Yakomoto. Mopar had sponsored NHRA drag racer Allen Johnson in that series Pro Stock division for 20 years, but for the 2016 season, they sponsored Jegs Coughlin Jr. and Erica Enders-Stevens.

Mopar remains active in drag racing events. It sponsors Don Schumacher Racing drivers, such as Tony Schumacher, in the Funny Car and Top Fuel classes of the NHRA Camping World Drag Racing Series. Drivers of the Mopar Dodge Challenger Drag Pak are eligible for a variety of Mopar contingency awards and benefits.

Mopar sponsors the Mopar Mile-High NHRA Nationals held each July in Denver. It is the longest-running sponsorship in all of drag racing.

== See also ==
- List of Chrysler engines
- ACDelco – General Motors' auto parts division
- Motorcraft – Ford's auto parts division
