= 2025 USAC Silver Crown Series =

American motorsport season

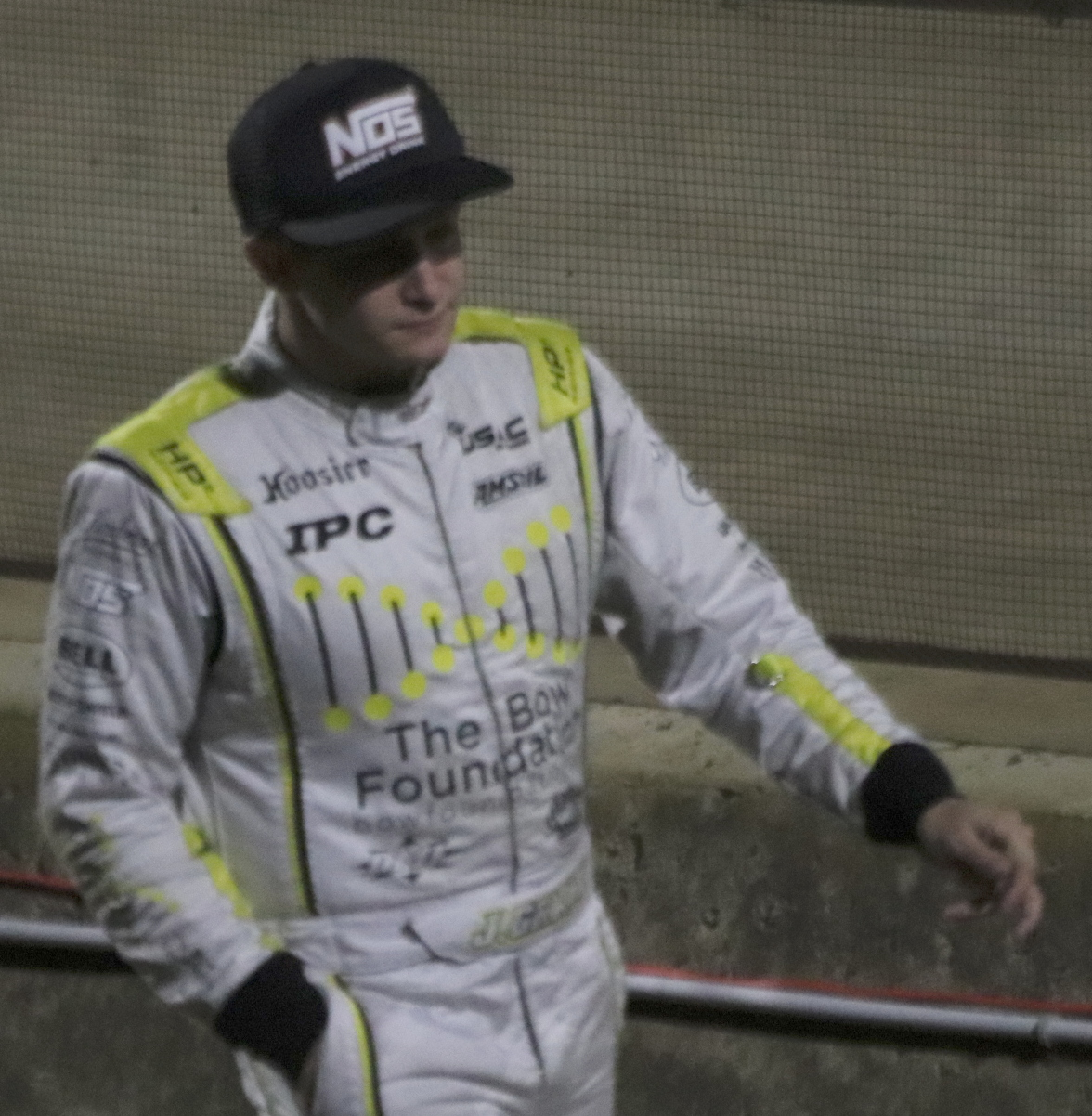
Justin Grant, the 2025 USAC Silver Crown Champion (Picuted in 2018).

The 2025 USAC Silver Crown Series was the 54th season of the USAC Silver Crown Series. It began with the Sumar Classic at Terre Haute Action Track on April 13 and concluded with the 4-Crown Nationals at Eldora Speedway on September 20. The season featured 13 championship events.

Justin Grant won the season championship, his second, having previously done so in 2020.

== Schedule ==
No.	Date	Race title	Track	Winner	TV/stream
1	April 13	Sumar Classic	Terre Haute Action Track	Logan Seavey	FloRacing
2	April 19	Rollie Beale Classic	Toledo Speedway	Justin Grant	FloRacing
3	May 16–17	Huncovsky Classic	Belleville High Banks	Justin Grant	FloRacing
4	May 23	Hoosier Hundred	Lucas Oil Indianapolis Raceway Park	Tyler Roahrig	FloRacing
5	June 14	Ranken Technical College Route 66 Classic	World Wide Technology Raceway	Kody Swanson	FloRacing
6	June 21	Eastern Blast	Port Royal Speedway	Daison Pursley	FloRacing
7	June 27	Rich Vogler Classic	Winchester Speedway	Kody Swanson	FloRacing
8	July 18–19	Salt City 100	Salt City Speedway	Briggs Danner	FloRacing
9	July 23	USAC RaceAid 100	Lucas Oil Indianapolis Raceway Park	C.J. Leary	FloRacing
10	August 9	Salem 100	Salem Speedway	Kody Swanson	FloRacing
11	August 16	Tony Bettenhausen 100	Illinois State Fairgrounds	Kody Swanson	FloRacing
12	August 30	Ted Horn 100	Du Quoin State Fairgrounds	C.J. Leary	FloRacing
13	September 19–20	4 Crown Nationals	Eldora Speedway	Daison Pursley	FloRacing

Dirt oval
Pavement oval
- The Rich Volger Classic at Winchester Speedway was originally scheduled for May 4, but USAC announced on May 2 that, due to forecasted rain and cool conditions, the event was postponed until June 27.

== Results and standings ==
=== Points Format ===
Position	1st	2nd	3rd	4th	5th	6th	7th	8th	9th	10th	11th	12th	13th	14th	15th	16th	17th	18th	19th	20th	21st	22nd	23rd	24th	25th	26th	27st	28th	29th	30th+
Points	70	67	64	61	58	55	52	49	46	43	41	39	37	35	33	31	29	27	25	23	22	21	20	19	18	17	16	15	14	13

- 3 additional points were awarded for being the fastest qualifier as well as leading the most laps in an event.

=== Drivers' championship ===
Pos	Driver	THAT	TOL	BHB	IRP	GTW	PRS	WIN	SCS	IRP	SLM	ISF	DSF	ELD	Points
1	Justin Grant	2	1*	1*	7	4	**2**	2	6	2	2	4	4	4	835
2	C.J. Leary	5	5	3	2	14	9	9	**2***	1*	4	5	1*	**2**	779
3	Matt Westfall	7	12	7	12	11	8	10	4	9	11	2	7	10	625
4	Kyle Steffens	DNS	13	13	18	6	12	8	11	6	6	21	6	12	521
5	Mario Clouser	DNS	8		**3**	7			10	8	8	3	3	7	502
6	Kody Swanson	16	**4**		4	**1***		**1***		15	**1***	**1***			493
7	Dave Berkheimer	14	17	9	20	18	19	19	14	16	13	31	17	27	375
8	Chase Stockon	19		4				11	3			7	2	13	347
9	Dakoda Armstrong		3		21	2		3		3	3				345
10	Logan Seavey	1		5	6		4	10						14	306
11	Taylor Ferns		10		11	10		6		12	12	12			299
12	Briggs Danner	4		14			7		1			30	24	8	299
13	Jake Swanson	18		2			10		12			10	14	16	285
14	Gregg Cory	23	14	8	14	13	17	11						18	273
15	Bobby Santos		6		16	3		4		**5**					272
16	Nathan Byrd				9	9		7		4	5				263
17	Tyler Roahrig		2		1*	17		12		10	DNS				261
18	Mitchel Moles	**9**		**12**			3					20	20	9	247
19	Jake Trainor RY		16		5	16		16		11	9				238
20	Kaylee Bryson	8	9	11		12				7					237
21	Daison Pursley	13*					1*							1*	186
22	Brian Tyler				15			13				6	5		183
23	Jackson Macenko R		11		8	5		15							181
24	Chase Dietz	6					5							6	168
25	Carmen Perigo						6					8		3	168
26	Saban Bibent R	11							8				13	17	166
27	Brady Bacon	3		10										5	165
28	Danny Jennings R				19				7			15	9		156
29	Jimmy Light	20					22					9	10	21	155
30	Shane Cockrum	15		15					13				21		135
31	Travis Mahoney R						21		9				15	24	130
32	Russ Gamester				17					13		23	12		125
33	Billy Wease					8					10				112
34	Kip Hughes R								5			13	28		110
35	Derek Bischak					15					7				105
36	Kyle O'Gara		7		10										95
37	Kevin Thomas Jr.												8	11	90
38	Tom Savage R						20					25	18	22	89
39	Kyle Robbins							17				22	23	26	87
40	Bryan Gossel			6	22										76
41	Casey Buckman				13							29	19		76
42	Colton Bettis R		15					14							68
43	Brian Ruhlman						14							15	68
44	Korey Weyant											14	16		66
45	A.J. Fike											11	**22**		65
46	Ryan Newman							5							58
47	Aric Gentry R	22											26		58
48	Will Armitage R											28	11		56
49	Rob Caho Jr. R											17		19	54
50	Kenny Gentry	21											27		48
51	Bill Rose	10													43
52	Shane Cottle											26		20	40
53	Ricky Thornton Jr. R	12													39
54	Alex Bright R						13								37
55	Dave Doran R									14					35
56	Kyle Cummins						15								33
57	Mark Bitner R						16								31
58	Chris Urish											16			31
59	Trey Osborne	17													29
60	Steve Gennetten R						18								27
61	Joey Moughan											18			27
62	Tim Kent R											27			26
63	Kale Drake R											19			25
64	Kyle Wissmiller R											24			19
65	Ken Schrader												25		18
66	Joe Trenca R													25	18
67	Chelby Hinton R													27	16
68	Mike Adkins R														10
Pos	Driver	THAT	TOL	BHB	IRP	GTW	PRS	WIN	SCS	IRP	SLM	ISF	DSF	ELD	Points

Color	Result
Gold	Winner
Silver	2nd-place finish
Bronze	3rd-place finish
Green	Top 5 finish
Light Blue	Top 10 finish
Dark Blue	11+ finish
Red	Did not qualify (DNQ)
Brown	Withdrew (Wth)
Black	Disqualified (DSQ)
White	Did Not Start (DNS)
White	Race abandoned (C)
Blank	Did not participate

**In-line notation**
**Bold**	Pole position (3 points)
*	Led most race laps (3 points)
RY	Rookie of the Year
R	Rookie
