= 2013 USAC Traxxas Silver Crown Series =

The 2013 USAC Traxxas Silver Crown Champ Car Series season was the 42nd season of the USAC Silver Crown Series. The series began with the Sumar Classic at the Terre Haute Action Track on April 28, and ended on September 21 at the Four Crown Nationals at Eldora Speedway. Bobby East began the season as the defending champion retained his title.

== Schedule/Results ==
No.	Date	Race title	Track	Winning driver
1	April 28	Sumar Classic	Terre Haute Action Track, Terre Haute, Indiana	Rained out
2	May 18	Hall of Fame Classic	Lucas Oil Raceway at Indianapolis, Clermont, Indiana	Rained out
3	May 24	Hoosier Hundred	Indiana State Fairgrounds, Indianapolis, Indiana	Levi Jones
4	June 1	Gateway 100	Gateway Motorsports Park, Madison, Illinois	Bobby Santos III
5	June 29	Rocky Mountain Classic	Pikes Peak International Raceway, Fountain, Colorado	Bobby East
6	July 27	JD Byrider Rich Vogler Classic 100	Lucas Oil Raceway at Indianapolis, Clermont, Indiana	Tanner Swanson
7	August 2	Hustle on the High Banks	Belleville High Banks, Belleville, Kansas	Tracy Hines
8	August 17	Bettenhausen 100	Illinois State Fairgrounds Racetrack, Springfield, Illinois	AJ Fike
9	September 1	Ted Horn Memorial 100	DuQuoin State Fairgrounds Racetrack, DuQuoin, Illinois	Chris Urish
10	September 21	Four Crown Nationals	Eldora Speedway, Rossburg, Ohio	Chris Windom

Dirt oval
Pavement oval
