= 2014 USAC Traxxas Silver Crown Series =

The 2014 USAC Traxxas Silver Crown Champ Car Series season was the 43rd season of the USAC Silver Crown Series. The series began with the Sumar Classic at the Terre Haute Action Track on April 6, and ended on October 11 at New York State Fairgrounds. Bobby East began the season as the defending champion, and Kody Swanson was the season champion.

== Schedule/Results ==
No.	Date	Race title	Track	Winning driver
1	April 6	Sumar Classic	Terre Haute Action Track, Terre Haute, Indiana	Kody Swanson
2	May 17	Hall of Fame Classic	Lucas Oil Raceway at Indianapolis, Clermont, Indiana	Tanner Swanson
3	May 22	Hoosier Hundred	Indiana State Fairgrounds, Indianapolis, Indiana	Kody Swanson
4	June 14	Gateway 100	Gateway Motorsports Park, Madison, Illinois	Bobby Santos III
5	June 29	Memphis 100	Memphis International Raceway, Millington, TN	Rained out
6	July 24	JD Byrider Rich Vogler Classic 100	Lucas Oil Raceway at Indianapolis, Clermont, Indiana	David Byrne
7	August 1	Hustle on the High Banks	Belleville High Banks, Belleville, Kansas	Kody Swanson
8	August 31	Ted Horn Memorial 100	DuQuoin State Fairgrounds Racetrack, DuQuoin, Illinois	Shane Cockrum
9	September 7	Bettenhausen 100	Illinois State Fairgrounds Racetrack, Springfield, Illinois	Kody Swanson
10	September 21	Four Crown Nationals	Eldora Speedway, Rossburg, Ohio	Jerry Coons Jr.
11	October 11	Salt City 78	New York State Fairgrounds, Syracuse, New York	Kody Swanson

Dirt oval
Pavement oval

== Teams/Drivers ==
No.	Driver(s)	Team/Entrant	Chassis	Engine	Round(s)
07	Jacob Wilson	Wilson			1-7,9-10
2	Ryan Newman	Bowman			6
2	Patrick Lawson	Lawson			1,3,4,8-11
3	AJ Fike	RFMS			1-6,8-9,11
4	Jarett Andretti	Andretti			2,4,6
5	Zach Daum	Daum			1,3,8
9	Caleb Armstrong	Armstrong			1-10
10	Bobby East	Stewart/Curb-Agajanian			All
10k	Ken Schrader	Stewart/Curb-Agajanian			6
11	Tanner Swanson	Swanson			2
11	Tanner Swanson	Bowman			4,6
14	Jarett Andretti	McQuinn			1,3
14	Brady Bacon	McQuinn			8-10
15	Dave Darland	Logan			2
16	Tracy Hines	Lightfoot			All
17	Chris Windom	RW/Curb-Agajanian			All
18	Kenny Gentry	Gentry			9,11
19	Dave Darland	Longworth			1,3,7-10
20	Jerry Coons Jr.	Nolen			6
20	Bryan Clauson	Nolen			9-10
21	Christopher Bell	Team Six-R			1-3
21	CJ Leary	Team Six-R			7
21	Jack Hewitt	Team Six-R			10
21	Ryan Litt	Team Six-R			6
23	Terry James	Satterhouse			8
25	Davey Ray	Sachs			1-7,9-11
26	Aaron Pierce	Pierce			1,3,10
27	Kyle O'Gara	RW			2,6
28	Tim Barber	Pierson			7
30	Andrew Felker	King			3
31	Jake Simmons	Simmons			1,3,7-8,10
33	Dakota Jackson	Jackson			1,3
35	Taylor Ferns	Ferns			1-3
35	CJ Leary	Ferns			6,8,10
36	Wes Miller	Miller			11
40	David Byrne	Byrne			2,4,6,9
41	Steven Russell	McQuinn			8-9
50	Jerry Bruce	Bruce			8
51	Russ Gamester	Gamester			3,8-10
53	Robbie Ray	SET			8
53	Robert Ballou	SET			10
53	Steve Buckwalter	SET			11
55	Randy Bateman	Bateman			3-4,8-9,11
56	Jon Stanbrough	Foxco			3
56	Levi Jones	Foxco			8-9
60	Davey Hamilton, Jr.	Hamilton			6
63	Kody Swanson	DePalma			1-11
66	Shane Cockrum	Hardy			1-3,8-11
77	Chris Urish	Urish			3,7-9
81	John Hunt	Williams			2,6
86	Jackie Burke	Burke			8-9
88	Chris Fetter	Fetter			8-9
90	John Heydenreich	Bank			6
91	John Hunt	Hunt			1,3,9
92	Cale Thomas	Thomas			2,4,6
96	Grant Simpson	Simpson			7
98	Jerry Coons, Jr.	RPM/Gormly			1,3,7-11
98	Bobby Santos III	RPM/Gormly			2,4,6
99	Joe Liguori	RPM/Gormly			1,3
99	Chris Phillips	RPM/Gormly			6
99	Christopher Bell	RPM/Gormly			7,10
99	Stewart Friesen	RPM/Gormly			11
102	Patrick Lawson	Lawson			6
117	Rich Tobias, Jr.	Tobias			11
981	Jarid Blondel	Blondel			6
