= 2026 USAC Silver Crown Series =

American motorsport season

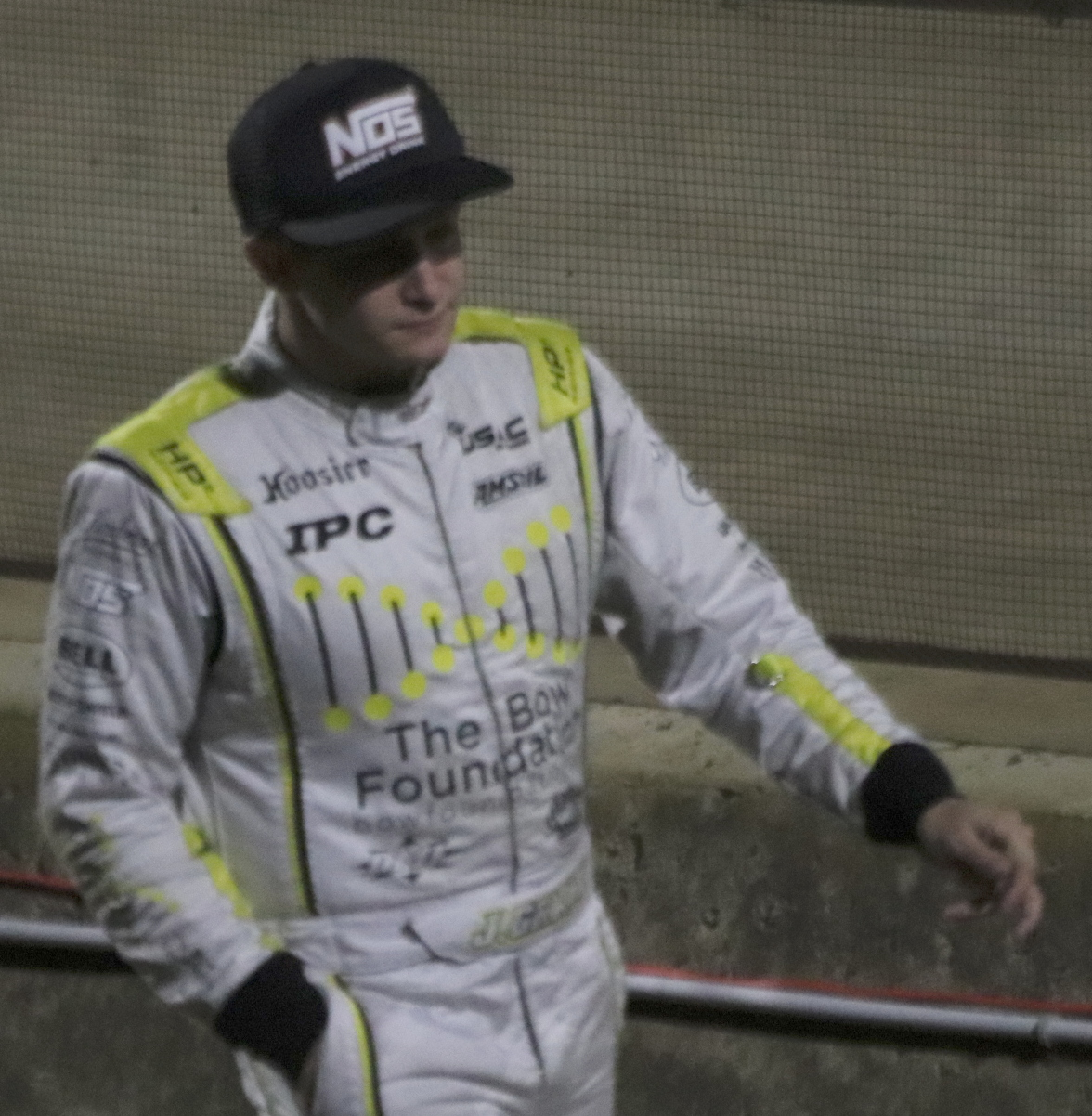
Justin Grant, the 2025 USAC Silver Crown Champion (Picuted in 2018).

The 2026 USAC Silver Crown Series is the 55th season of the USAC Silver Crown Series. It began with the Salt City 100 at Salt City Speedway in Hutinson, Kansaas on May 8 and concluded with the Rollie Beale Classic at Toledo Speedway on October 3. The season was scheduled for 12 championship events, equally split between dirt and pavement ovals. After event cancellations for weather, a total of 10 rounds were contested.

Justin Grant entered the season as the defending champion. C.J. Leary finished first in the point standings, earning his first Silver Crown championship. Chelby Hinton earned rookie of the year honors.

== Schedule ==
| No. | Date | Race title | Track | Winner | TV/stream |
|---|---|---|---|---|---|
| 1 | May 9 | Salt City 100 | Salt City Speedway | Hayden Reinbold | FloRacing |
| 2 | June 7 | Route 66 Classic | World Wide Technology Raceway | C.J. Leary | FloRacing |
| 3 | June 25 | Hoosier Hundred | Lucas Oil Indianapolis Raceway Park | Dakoda Armstrong | FloRacing |
| 4 | July 5 | Sumar Classic | Terre Haute Action Track | Mitchel Moles | FloRacing |
| 5 | July 19 | Rich Vogler Classic | Winchester Speedway | Briggs Danner | FloRacing |
| 6 | August 8 | Iowa 100 | Iowa Speedway | C.J. Leary | FloRacing |
| 7 | August 22 | Tony Bettenhausen 100 | Illinois State Fairgrounds | Briggs Danner | FloRacing |
| 8 | September 5 | Ted Horn 100 | Du Quoin State Fairgrounds | C.J. Leary | FloRacing |
| 9 | September 25-26 | 4 Crown Nationals | Eldora Speedway | Daison Pursley | FloRacing |
| 10 | October 3 | Rollie Beale Classic | Toledo Speedway | Briggs Danner | FloRacing |

Dirt oval
Pavement oval
- The Hoosier Hundred at Lucas Oil Indianapolis Raceway Park was originally scheduled for May 22. However, USAC postponed the event until June 25th due to forecasted rain.
- The round at Port Royal Speedway scheduled for June 20 was rained out, and the event was not rescheduled.

== Results and standings ==
=== Points Format ===
| Position | 1st | 2nd | 3rd | 4th | 5th | 6th | 7th | 8th | 9th | 10th | 11th | 12th | 13th | 14th | 15th | 16th | 17th | 18th | 19th | 20th | 21st | 22nd | 23rd | 24th | 25th | 26th | 27st | 28th | 29th | 30th+ |
|---|---|---|---|---|---|---|---|---|---|---|---|---|---|---|---|---|---|---|---|---|---|---|---|---|---|---|---|---|---|---|
| Points | 70 | 67 | 64 | 61 | 58 | 55 | 52 | 49 | 46 | 43 | 41 | 39 | 37 | 35 | 33 | 31 | 29 | 27 | 25 | 23 | 22 | 21 | 20 | 19 | 18 | 17 | 16 | 15 | 14 | 13 |

- 3 additional points are awarded for being the fastest qualifier as well as leading the most laps in an event.

=== Drivers' championship ===
| Pos | Driver | SCS | GTW | PRS | IRP | THAT | WIN | IOW | ISF | DSF | TBA | ELD | TOL | Points |
|---|---|---|---|---|---|---|---|---|---|---|---|---|---|---|
| 1 | C.J. Leary | 3 | **1*** | | | | | | | | | | | 140 |
| 2 | Justin Grant | **2*** | 8 | | | | | | | | | | | 122 |
| 3 | Kyle Steffens | 4 | 4 | | | | | | | | | | | 122 |
| 4 | Mario Clouser | 5 | 5 | | | | | | | | | | | 116 |
| 5 | Briggs Danner | 7 | 10 | | | | | | | | | | | 95 |
| 6 | Gregg Cory | 11 | 13 | | | | | | | | | | | 78 |
| 7 | Hayden Reinbold | 1 | | | | | | | | | | | | 70 |
| 8 | Dave Berkheimer | 16 | 12 | | | | | | | | | | | 70 |
| 9 | Bobby Santos | | 2 | | | | | | | | | | | 67 |
| 10 | Jackson Macenko | | 3 | | | | | | | | | | | 64 |
| 11 | Chase Stockon | 6 | | | | | | | | | | | | 55 |
| 12 | Kaylee Bryson | | 6 | | | | | | | | | | | 55 |
| 13 | Michael Lewis | | 7 | | | | | | | | | | | 52 |
| 14 | Steve Gennetten | 8 | | | | | | | | | | | | 49 |
| 15 | Danny Jennings | 9 | | | | | | | | | | | | 46 |
| 16 | Dakoda Armstrong | | 9 | | | | | | | | | | | 46 |
| 17 | Kip Hughes | 10 | | | | | | | | | | | | 43 |
| 18 | Davey Hamilton Jr. | | 11 | | | | | | | | | | | 41 |
| 19 | Jake Swanson | 12 | | | | | | | | | | | | 39 |
| 20 | Bret Tripplett R | 13 | | | | | | | | | | | | 37 |
| 21 | Mitchel Moles | 14 | | | | | | | | | | | | 35 |
| 22 | Kyle O'Gara | | 14 | | | | | | | | | | | 35 |
| 23 | Kale Drake R | 15 | | | | | | | | | | | | 33 |
| 24 | Brent Yarnal R | | 15 | | | | | | | | | | | 33 |
| 25 | Colton Bettis R | | 16 | | | | | | | | | | | 31 |
| 26 | Bryan Gossel | 17 | | | | | | | | | | | | 29 |
| 27 | Jake Trainor | | DNS | | | | | | | | | | | 10 |
| Pos | Driver | SCS | GTW | PRS | IRP | THAT | WIN | IOW | ISF | DSF | TBA | ELD | TOL | Points |

| Color | Result |
|---|---|
| Gold | Winner |
| Silver | 2nd-place finish |
| Bronze | 3rd-place finish |
| Green | Top 5 finish |
| Light Blue | Top 10 finish |
| Dark Blue | 11+ finish |
| Red | Did not qualify (DNQ) |
| Brown | Withdrew (Wth) |
| Black | Disqualified (DSQ) |
| White | Did Not Start (DNS) |
| White | Race abandoned (C) |
| Blank | Did not participate |

**In-line notation**
| **Bold** | Pole position (3 point3) |
| * | Led most race laps (3 points) |
| RY | Rookie of the Year |
| R | Rookie |
