= 2015 USAC Honda National Midgets =

The 2015 USAC Honda National Midget Series is the 60th season of the USAC National Midget Series. The series began with the Kokomo Grand Prix at Kokomo Speedway on April 10, and will end with the Turkey Night Grand Prix at Perris Auto Speedway on November 26. Rico Abreu will be the defending champion.

No.	Date	Race title	Track	Winning driver
1	April 10	Kokomo Grand Prix	Kokomo Speedway	rained out
2	April 11	Kokomo Grand Prix	Kokomo Speedway	Darren Hagen
3	May 29		Plymouth Speedway	Kevin Thomas Jr.
4	May 30		Plymouth Speedway	rained out
5	June 10	Indiana Midget Week	Gas City I-69 Speedway	Tanner Thorson
6	June 11	Indiana Midget Week	Lincoln Park Speedway	Bryan Clauson
7	June 12	Indiana Midget Week	Bloomington Speedway	Christopher Bell
8	June 13	Indiana Midget Week	Lawrenceburg Speedway	Rico Abreu
9	June 21	Indiana Midget Week	Kokomo Speedway	rained out
10	July 5	Pepsi Nationals	Angell Park Speedway	Rico Abreu
11	July 28	Chad McDaniel Memorial	Solomon Valley Raceway	Kevin Thomas Jr.
12	July 30	Belleville Midget Nationals	Belleville High Banks	Rico Abreu
13	August 1	Belleville Midget Nationals	Belleville High Banks	Bryan Clauson
14	August 18	USAC Midget Eastern Storm	Path Valley Speedway Park	Rico Abreu
15	August 19	USAC Midget Eastern Storm	Lincoln Speedway	Rico Abreu
16	August 20	USAC Midget Eastern Storm	Susquehanna Speedway Park	rained out
17	September 4	Gold Crown Midget Nationals	Tri-City Speedway	Tanner Thorson
18	September 5	Gold Crown Midget Nationals	Tri-City Speedway	Tanner Thorson
19	September 26	34th Annual 4-Crown Nationals	Eldora Speedway	Christopher Bell
20	October 23	Jason Leffler Memorial	Wayne County Speedway	Bryan Clauson
21	November 26	Turkey Night Grand Prix	Perris Auto Speedway	Tanner Thorson

== Schedule notes ==
- - The June 21 race at Kokomo Speedway was originally scheduled for June 14 but was postponed due to inclement weather. The race was canceled after inclement weather hit the area on that night as well
- - The July 5 race at Angell Park Speedway was co-sanctioned with the POWRi Lucas Oil National Midget Series & Badger Midgets
- - The Eastern Storm races at Path Valley Speedway Park, Lincoln Speedway, and Susquehanna Speedway Park were co-sanctioned with the ARDC.
- - The October 23 race at Wayne County Speedway will be co-sanctioned with the POWRi Lucas Oil National Midget Series
- - The Turkey Night Grand Prix at Perris Auto Speedway will be a combined series race with the USAC Honda Western States Midgets
