= Robbie Stanley =

American racing driver

Robert William Stanley (November 16, 1967, in Brownsburg, Indiana – May 26, 1994, in Winchester, Indiana) was an American auto racing driver.

Stanley competed in NASCAR Busch Series between 1992 and 1994, he attempted three races, failed to qualify in one of them and ran the other two. His best finish was 15th at Indianapolis Raceway Park in 1993 season.

After winning the All-Star Circuit of Champions championship in 1989, Stanley began racing in USAC. It was there that he collected three straight USAC National sprint car championships in 1991, 1992, and 1993 and was on his way to a fourth when his career was cut short in a fatal accident in a USAC sprint car event in Winchester, Indiana, on May 26, 1994.

The family's quarter midget construction operation is named in his memory.

== Awards ==
- 2005 - Inducted into the National Sprint Car Hall of Fame
- 1994 - Inducted into Hoosier Auto Racing Fans (HARF) "Hall of Fame"
- 1993 - USAC National Sprint Car Series "Champion"
- 1992 - USAC National Sprint Car Series "Champion"
- 1991 - USAC National Sprint Car Series "Champion"
- 1989 - All-Star Circuit of Champions "Champion"
- 1989 - Hoosier Auto Racing Fans (HARF) "Most Improved Driver"
- 1984 - Paragon, (IN) Speedway "Rookie of the Year"
- 1980 - Quarter Midget "National Champion"
