= Russ Gamester =

American racing driver

Russell Gamester (born January 9, 1965) is an American auto racing driver.

== Career ==
A long time competitor in United States Auto Club (USAC) racing, Gamester collected the USAC National Midget Championship title in 1989. In 1991, Gamester entered the NASCAR Sportsman Division for three races at Charlotte Motor Speedway, with a best finish of 30th. Gamester finished runner-up in the 1999 USAC Silver Crown Series. Gamester won his first USAC Silver Crown race at Indianapolis Raceway Park in 2000.

Gamester passed his IRL rookie test at Texas Motor Speedway in 2000. He attempted to complete rookie orientation for the 2000 Indianapolis 500 in a Dreyer & Reinbold Racing car, but only completed one phase.

== Racing record ==
=== Indy Racing League ===
Year	Team	1	2	3	4	5	6	7	8	9	Rank	Points
2000	Dreyer & Reinbold Racing	WDW	PHX	LSV	INDY; DNS	TEX	PIK	ATL	KTY	TEX	-	0
