= Logan Seavey =

American racing driver (born 1997)

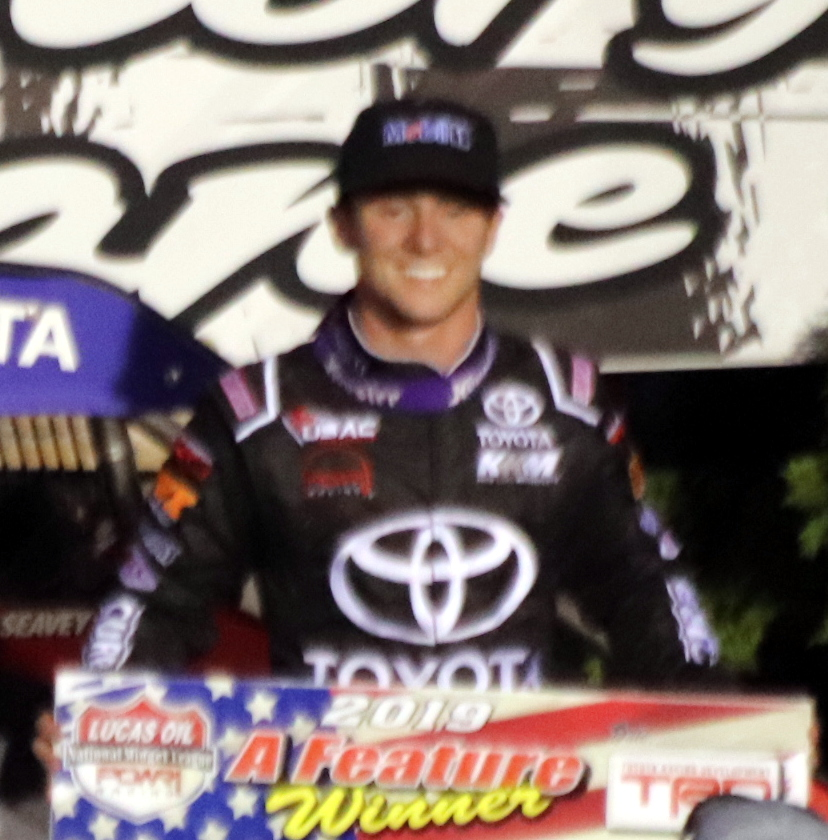
- Seavey after winning the 2019 Pepsi Nationals
- Born: Logan Norman Seavey; June 9, 1997 (age 29); Sutter, California, U.S.
- Achievements: 2023 USAC Silver Crown Series Champion; 2018, 2023 USAC National Midget Series Champion; 2017 POWRi Lucas Oil National Midget Series Champion; 2019, 2023 Indiana Midget Week Champion; 2018, 2019 POWRi Illinois SPEEDWeek Champion; 2018 Shamrock Classic Winner; 2021, 2022, 2023 4-Crown Nationals Silver Crown Winner; 2021 Turkey Night Grand Prix Winner; 2023, 2024 Chili Bowl Nationals Winner

NASCAR FedEx Freight Truck Series career
- 1 race run over 1 year
- 2018 position: 46th
- Best finish: 46th (2018)
- First race: 2018 Eldora Dirt Derby (Eldora)
Wins	Top tens	Poles
0	1	0

ARCA Menards Series career
- 4 races run over 2 years
- Best finish: 40th (2019)
- First race: 2018 Allen Crowe 100 (Springfield)
- Last race: 2019 Southern Illinois 200 (DuQuoin)
- First win: 2018 Southern Illinois 200 (DuQuoin)
Wins	Top tens	Poles
1	4	0
- Statistics up to date as of August 21, 2022.

Logan Norman Seavey (born June 9, 1997) is an American professional stock car racing driver. He currently competes part-time in the Interstate Batteries High Limit sprint car series, driving the No. 87 for Chase Briscoe Racing and full-time in the USAC P1 Insurance National Midget Championship for Abacus racing driving the No. 57 with support from Toyota Racing Development.

After winning the 2017 POWRi National Midget championship, he won the 2018 USAC National Midget championship in his rookie season. He won the 2021 Turkey Night Grand Prix race.

== Racing career ==
=== NASCAR ===
==== Camping World Truck Series ====
Seavey made his NASCAR Camping World Truck Series debut on July 18, 2018 in the No. 51 for Kyle Busch Motorsports. After leading 53 laps and seeming to have raced the win away, a caution came out to bring out overtime which in turn shuffled Seavey back to eighth where he finished.

=== ARCA Racing Series ===
Seavey made his debut in the ARCA Racing Series at the Illinois State Fairgrounds Racetrack for Venturini Motorsports where he qualified in fourth and went on to finish third. Two races later, Seavey returned with Venturini Motorsports and won his first career ARCA race at the DuQuoin State Fairgrounds Racetrack after dominating the majority of the end of the race.

=== USAC National Midgets ===
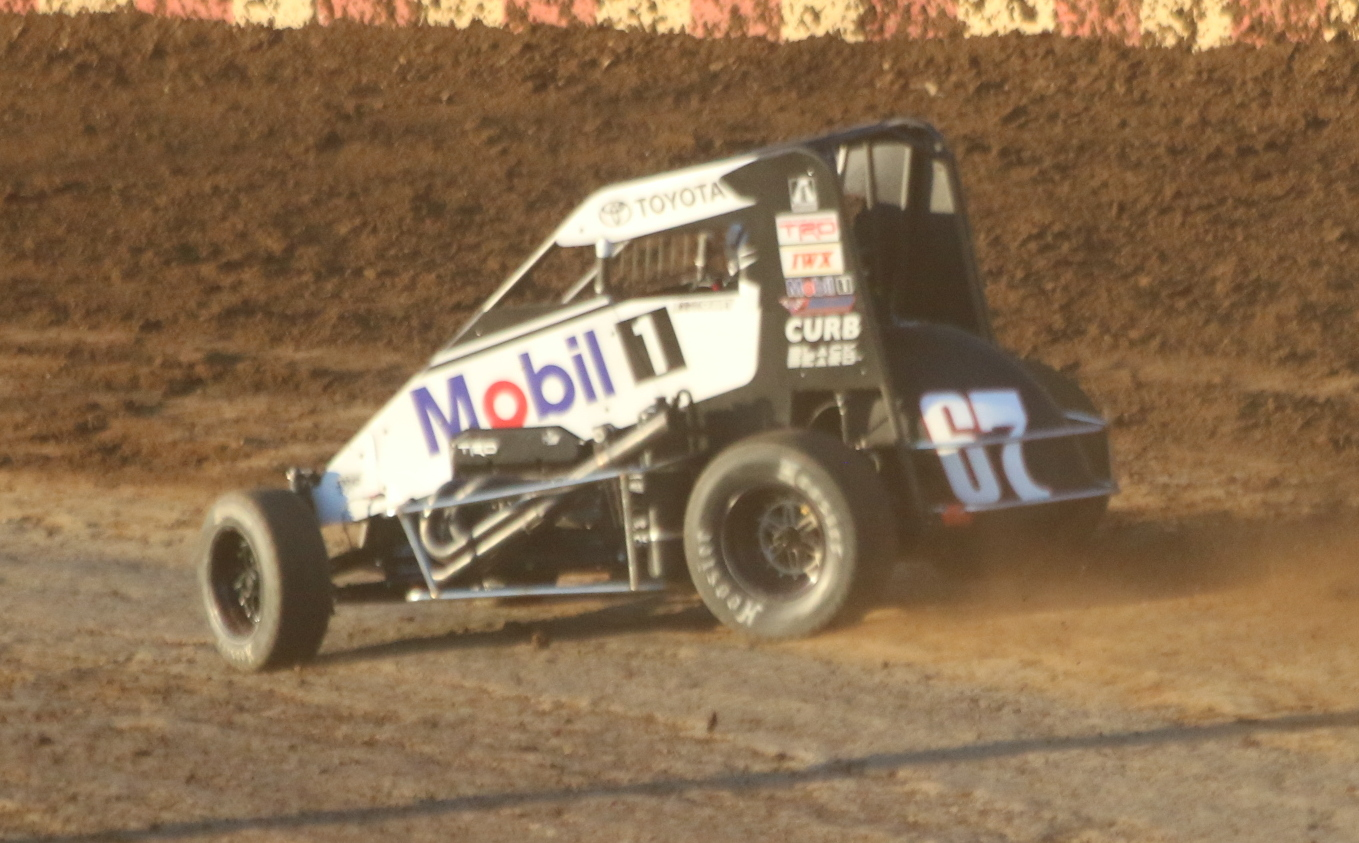
Seavey's 2018 midget

Seavey currently competes full-time in the USAC Midgets in the No. 57 for Abacus Motorsports. He also drives the No. 5B sprint car for Briscoe Racing on a limited basis. In 2018, Seavey won the USAC National Midget Championship and that made him just the third series rookie to win the USAC National Midget championship, joining Danny Caruthers in 1971 and Christopher Bell in 2013. Seavey won the 2021 Turkey Night Grand Prix. It was his second national midget win of the season and eighth of his career. The win made him the first driver to sweep of winning the final race of the season for all three USAC national series (also Silver Crown and Sprint cars).

=== USAC National Sprints ===
On August 23, 2019, Seavey picked up his first USAC National Sprint win at the Kokomo Speedway with Reinbold/Underwood Racing.

=== POWRi National Midget League ===
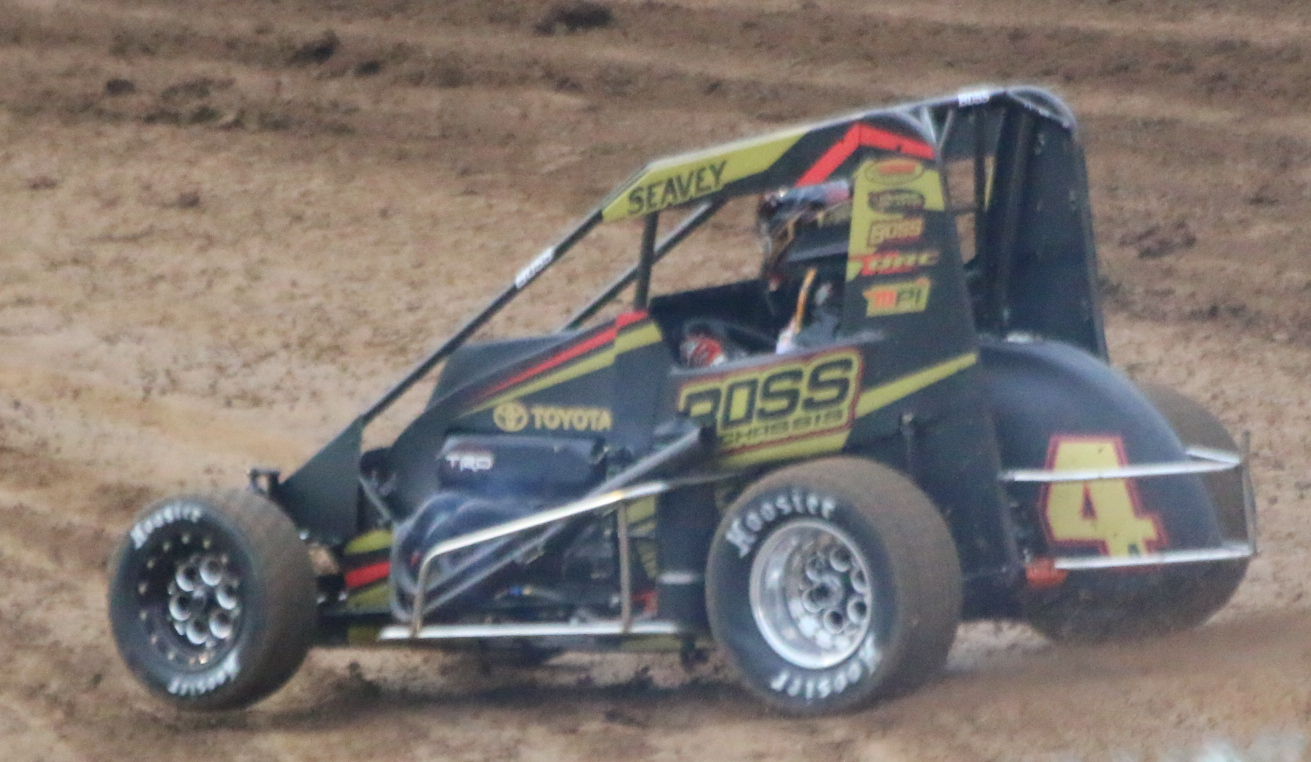
Seavey's 2017 POWRi midget

Seavey has competed part-time in the POWRi National Midget League in the No. 67 for Keith Kunz Motorsports. In his rookie season in 2017, Seavey recorded two victories and the championship.

=== Midget racing in New Zealand ===
During the 2024/25 season, Seavey raced a Midget in New Zealand, driving for Green Way Racing. On January 4, 2025, Seavey came third in the New Zealand Midget Championship, behind Michael "Buddy" Kofoid and Australian Kaidon Brown. He then departed New Zealand to attempt the three-peat at the Chili Bowl Nationals.

== Motorsports career results ==
=== NASCAR ===
(key) (Bold – Pole position awarded by qualifying time. Italics – Pole position earned by points standings or practice time. * – Most laps led.)

==== Camping World Truck Series ====
NASCAR Camping World Truck Series results
Year	Team	No.	Make	1	2	3	4	5	6	7	8	9	10	11	12	13	14	15	16	17	18	19	20	21	22	23	NCWTC	Pts	Ref
2018	Kyle Busch Motorsports	51	Toyota	DAY	ATL	LVS	MAR	DOV	KAN	CLT	TEX	IOW	GTW	CHI	KEN	ELD; 8	POC	MCH	BRI	MSP	LVS	TAL	MAR	TEX	PHO	HOM	46th	46	

=== ARCA Menards Series ===
(key) (Bold – Pole position awarded by qualifying time. Italics – Pole position earned by points standings or practice time. * – Most laps led.)

ARCA Menards Series results
Year	Team	No.	Make	1	2	3	4	5	6	7	8	9	10	11	12	13	14	15	16	17	18	19	20	AMSC	Pts	Ref
2018	Venturini Motorsports	20	Toyota	DAY	NSH	SLM	TAL	TOL	CLT	POC	MCH	MAD	GTW	CHI	IOW	ELK	POC	ISF; 3	BLN	DSF; 1	SLM	IRP	KAN	46th	455	
2019	Venturini Motorsports	20	Toyota	DAY	FIF	SLM	TAL	NSH	TOL	CLT	POC	MCH	MAD	GTW	CHI	ELK	IOW	POC	ISF; 4	DSF; 2	SLM	IRP	KAN	40th	440	

^{*} Season still in progress
^{1} Ineligible for series points
