= Port Royal Speedway =

Racetrack in Pennsylvania

Coordinates: 40.5358°N 77.3895°W

The Speed Palace
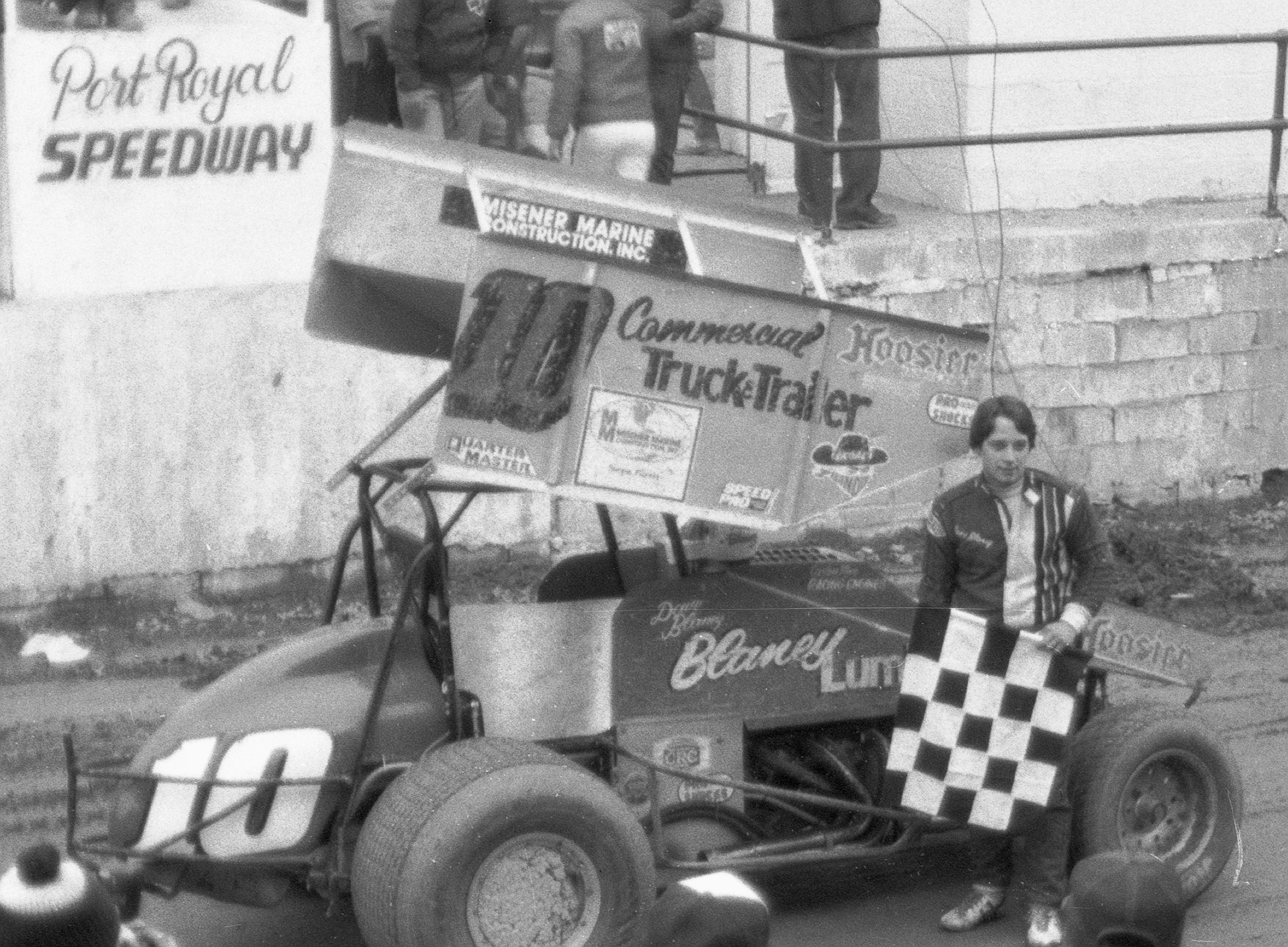
- Dave Blaney's sprint car in Port Royal victory lane in 1984
- Location: Port Royal, Pennsylvania
- Opened: 1938
- Major events: World of Outlaws Sprint Cars; World of Outlaws Late Model Series; All Star Circuit of Champions; USAC National Sprint Cars; Tuscarora 50; Pennsylvania Speedweek

Oval
- Surface: Clay
- Length: 0.50 mi (0.8 km)
- Turns: 4

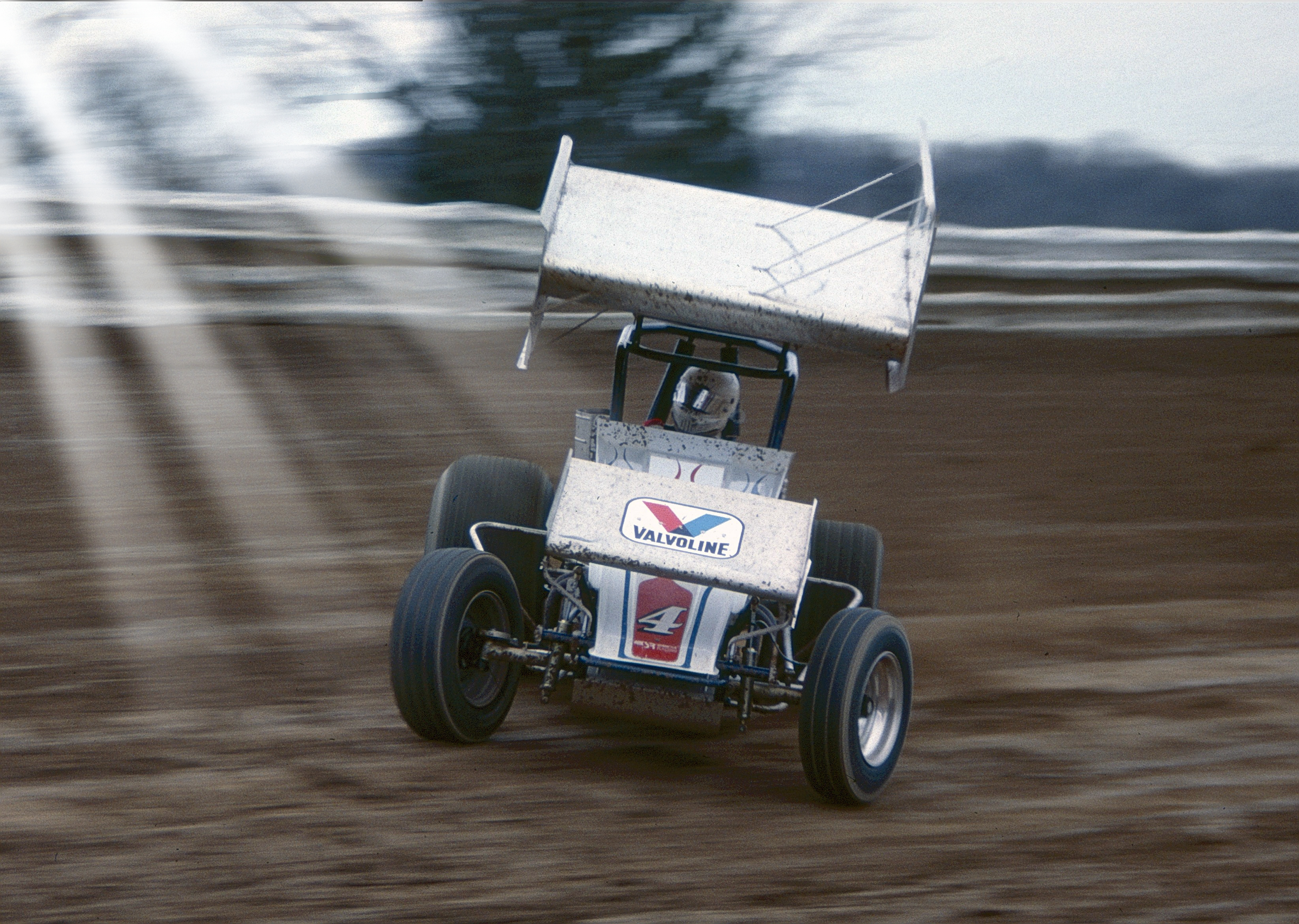
Rich Vogler's Sprint car in 1984

Port Royal Speedway is a 0.5-mile (0.80 km) dirt racetrack in Port Royal, Juniata County, Pennsylvania in the United States. It was opened on September 10, 1938.

== History ==
Like all of the tracks in the United States, it closed during the World War II years (1941–1945) and re-opened in 1946. Port Royal Speedway hosts a weekly schedule of local Sprint Car, Late Model, and Pro-Stock dirt track racing, and is nicknamed "The Speed Palace". Several national touring series organizations visit the track during the racing season, including the World of Outlaws Late Model Series and the All Star Circuit of Champions. Port Royal Speedway is the host of the Juniata County Fair.

== Port Royal Sprint Car Track Champions ==
Year	Car #	Driver
1950	51	Eddie McCardle
1951	51	Eddie McCardle
1952	4	Dick “Pete” Swarmer
1953	74	Carl Vogt
1954	9	Eddie McCardle
1955	50	Dick “Pete” Swarmer
1956	11	Hal Hoose
1957	6	Dick “Pete” Swarmer
1958	3	Al Chamberlain
1959	6	Dick “Toby” Tobias
1960	6	Dick “Toby” Tobias
1961	15	Frankie Thompson
1962	15	Frankie Thompson
1963	15	Frankie Thompson
1964	39	Johnny Dubendorf
1965	80	Bob Foor
1966	1	Dick “Pete” Swarmer
1967	6	Mitch Smith
1968	7	Leroy Felty
1969	66	Johnny Grum
1970	711	Elmer Ruby
1971	711	Elmer Ruby
1972	880	Larry “Smokey” Snellbaker
1973	880	Larry “Smokey” Snellbaker
1974	5	Larry “Smokey” Snellbaker
1975	66	Johnny Grum
1976	1	Lynn Paxton
1977	77	Mitch Smith
1978	33	Keith Kauffman
1979	33	Keith Kauffman
1980	33	Keith Kauffman
1981	29	Keith Kauffman
1982	5W	Randy Wolfe
1983	77A	Lynn Paxton
1984	77	Keith Kauffman
1985	77	Keith Kauffman
1986	880	Keith Kauffman
1987	461	Paul Lotier
1988	880	Keith Kauffman
1989	17	Dave Kelly
1990	461	Joey Allen
1991	55	Mike Wagner
1992	461	Lance Dewease
1993	461	Lance Dewease
1994	461	Lance Dewease
1995	88	Todd Shaffer
1996	461	Lance Dewease
1997	461	Lance Dewease
1998	88	Todd Shaffer
1999	7	Keith Kauffman
2000	88H	Lance Dewease
2001	7	Keith Kauffman
2002	7	Keith Kauffman
2003	88	Todd Shaffer
2004	7	Keith Kauffman
2005	1	Mark Smith
2006	11	Mike Erdley
2007	7	Keith Kauffman
2008	88	Todd Shaffer
2009	88	Todd Shaffer
2010	7	Chad Layton
2011	55	Mike Wagner
2012	7	Chad Layton
2013	12	Blane Heimbach
2014	0	Rick Lafferty
2015	1z	Lucas Wolfe
2016	07	Doug Esh
2017	3z	Brock Zearfoss
2018	1z	Logan Wagner
2019	1z	Logan Wagner
2020	1z	Logan Wagner
2021	1z	Logan Wagner
2022	1z	Logan Wagner
2023	23	Devin Borden

== Tuscarora 50 winners ==
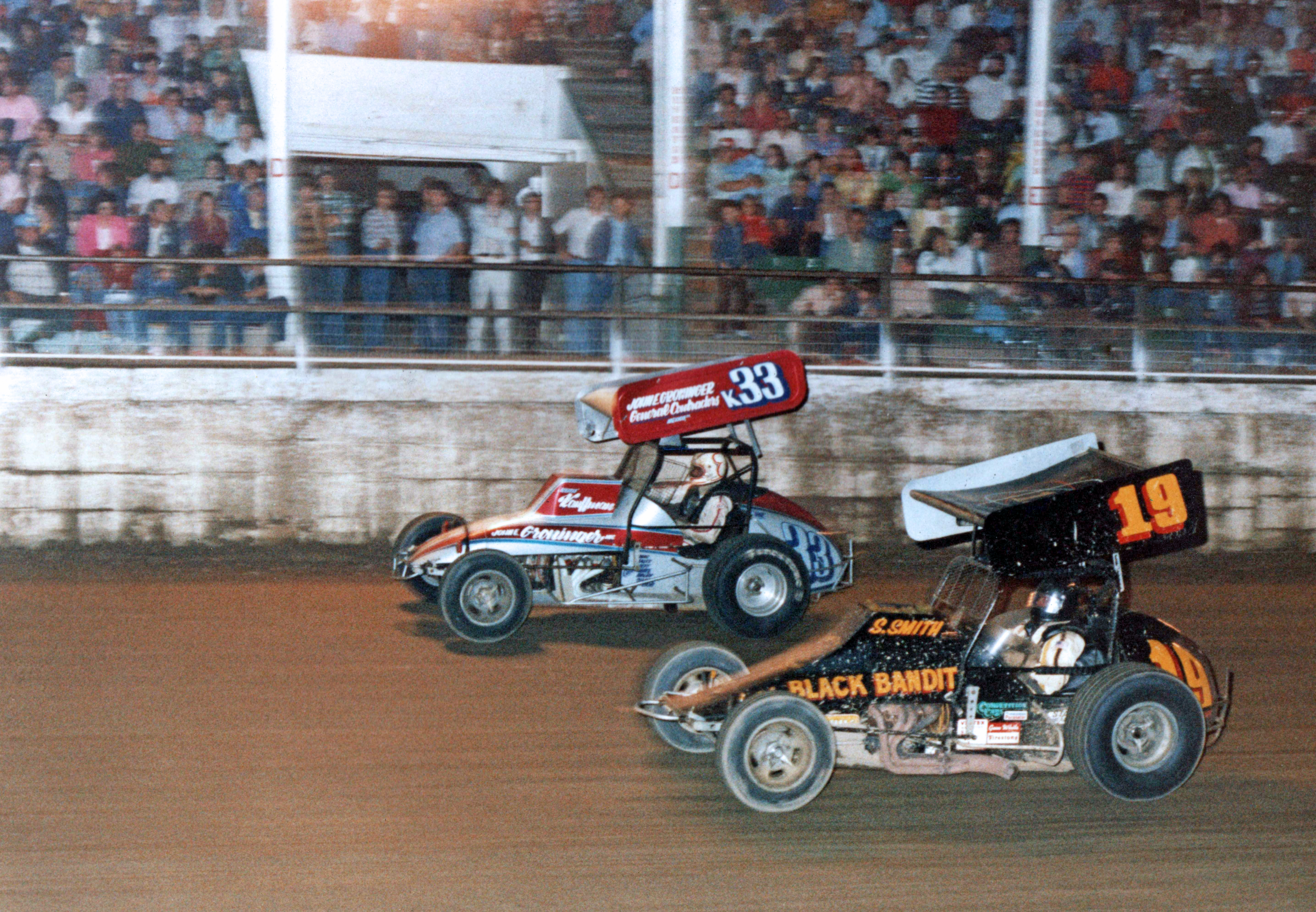
Keith Kauffman passes Steve Smith in the final lap to win the 1978 Tuscarora 50

Date	Car #	Driver
9/21/1968	5	Mitch Smith
9/27/1969	5	Mitch Smith
9/11/1970	5	Mitch Smith
9/11/1971	77	Smokey Snellbaker
9/8/1972	1	Lynn Paxton
9/7/1973	29	Kenny Weld
9/7/1974	1	Lynn Paxton
9/20/1975	19	Steve Smith
9/10/1976	44	Jim Nace
9/17/1977	1	Gary Howsare
9/8/1978	33	Keith Kauffman
9/7/1979	56	Smokey Snellbaker
9/5/1980	1	Lynn Paxton
9/11/1981	29	George Ferguson Jr.
9/9/1982	1A	Bobby Allen
9/9/1983	40	Dave Blaney
9/7/1984	29	Doug Wolfgang
9/6/1985	29	Doug Wolfgang
9/5/1986	29	Doug Wolfgang
9/25/1987	29	Doug Wolfgang
9/9/1988	19	Stevie Smith
9/8/1989	1A	Bobby Allen
9/7/1990	11	Todd Shaffer
9/6/1991	11	Todd Shaffer
9/11/1992	3K	Len Krautheim III.
9/10/1993	69K	Don Kreitz Jr.
9/9/1994	461	Lance Dewease
9/8/1995	88	Todd Shaffer
9/20/1996	77	Fred Rahmer
9/5/1997	77	Fred Rahmer
9/12/1998	12	Greg Hodnett
9/11/1999	69K	Don Kreitz Jr.
9/9/2000	77	Fred Rahmer
9/8/2001	88H	Lance Dewease
9/7/2002	77	Lance Dewease
9/6/2003	7	Keith Kauffman
9/11/2004	12	Greg Hodnett
9/10/2005	88H	Fred Rahmer
9/9/2006	25	Lance Dewease
9/8/2007	30	Doug Esh
9/7/2008	11	Mike Erdley
9/12/2009	22	Greg Hodnett
9/11/2010	21	Brian Montieth
9/10/2011	1	Stevie Smith
9/8/2012	30	Doug Esh
9/7/2013	69k	Don Kreitz Jr.
9/6/2014	27	Greg Hodnett
9/13/2015	19m	Brent Marks
9/10/2016	69k	Lance Dewease
9/9/2017	69k	Lance Dewease
10/28/2018	15	Donny Schatz
9/9/2019	87	Aaron Reutzel
9/12/2020	69k	Lance Dewease
9/11/2021	1z	Logan Wagner
9/10/2022	39M	Anthony Macri
9/5/2023	21	Brian Brown
