= United States Auto Club =

Auto racing sanctioning body in the US

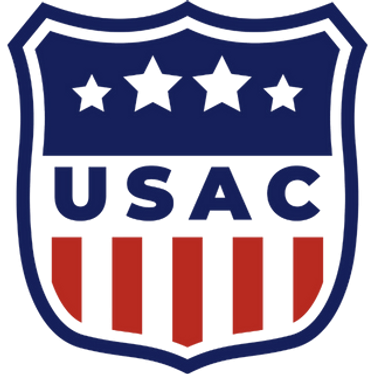
- Sport: Auto racing
- Jurisdiction: United States
- Abbreviation: USAC
- Founded: 1955
- Headquarters: Speedway, Indiana, U.S.
- President: Kasey Coler
- Chairman: Jeff Stoops

Official website
- unitedstatesautoclub.com

The United States Auto Club (USAC) is one of the sanctioning bodies of auto racing in the United States. From 1956 to 1979, USAC sanctioned the United States National Championship, and from 1956 to 1997 the organization sanctioned the Indianapolis 500. USAC serves as the sanctioning body for a number of racing series, including the Silver Crown Series, National Sprint Cars, National Midgets, Speed2 Midget Series, .25 Midget Series, Stadium Super Trucks, and GT World Challenge America. Seven-time USAC champion Levi Jones is USAC's Competition Director.

== History ==
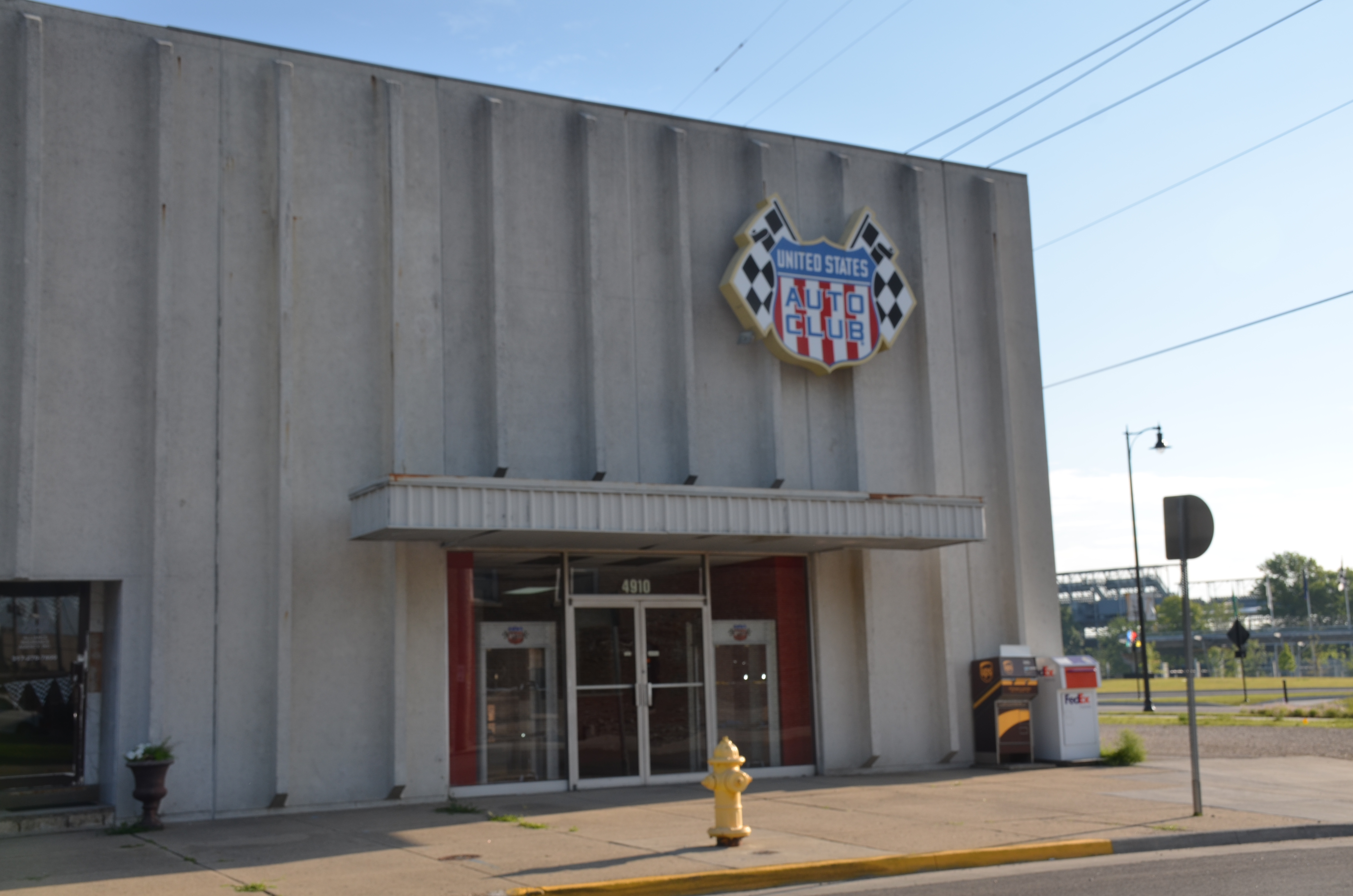
USAC's headquarters on 16th Street in Speedway, Indiana, less than a block from the Indianapolis Motor Speedway (visible behind the headquarters)

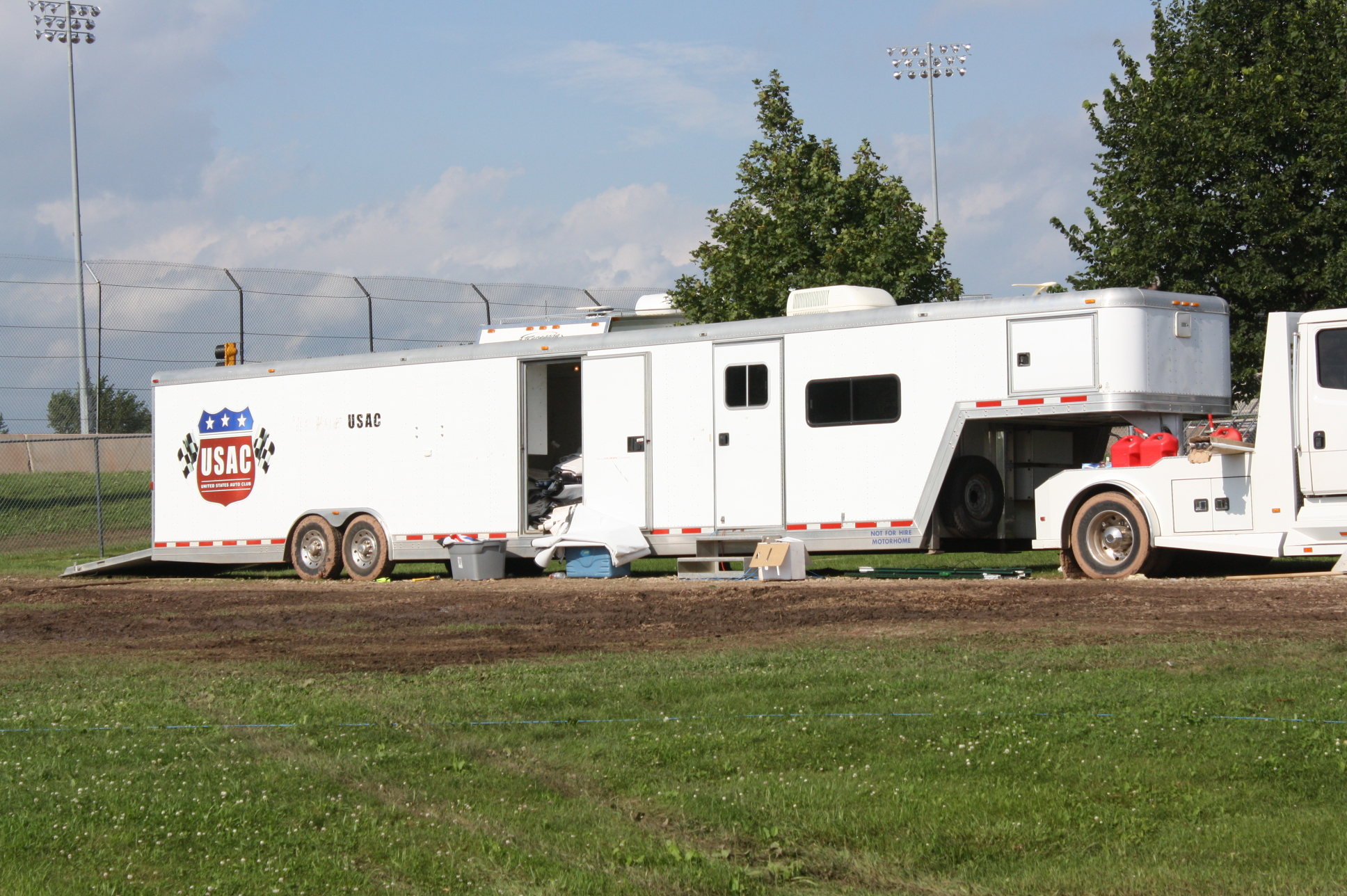
USAC's trailer at a TRAXXAS The Off-Road Championship (TORC) event

When the American Automobile Association (AAA) withdrew from auto racing after the 1955 season, citing the Le Mans disaster and the death of Bill Vukovich at Indianapolis as contributing factors, both the SCCA and NASCAR were mentioned as its potential successor. Ultimately, USAC was formed by Indianapolis Motor Speedway owner Tony Hulman. It became the arbiter of rules, car design, and other matters for what it termed championship auto racing, the highest level of USAC racing. For a while there was a separate series of specifications for championship cars designed to be run on dirt, rather than paved, tracks. Today, USAC sanction open-wheel racing series such as the Silver Crown Series, National Sprint Car Series, National Midget Series, and Quarter Midgets.

=== Triple crown ===
The "triple crown" is earned in USAC racing when a driver claims all three national championships (Silver Crown, sprint car, and midget car). Only two drivers, Tony Stewart (1995) and J. J. Yeley (2003), have achieved the triple crown in a single season. Six other drivers, Pancho Carter (1972–78), Dave Darland (1997–2001), Jerry Coons Jr. (2006–08), Tracy Hines (2000, 2002, 2015), Chris Windom (2016, 2017, 2020), and Logan Seavey (2023–2024) have claimed each of the three championships at least once in their careers. In 2012 Mike Curb and Cary Agajanian became the only car owners to win the triple crown by winning all three championships in the same year.

=== National championship ===
USAC awarded a national championship until A. J. Foyt won his seventh title in 1979. It resumed awarding a national championship in 2010. A driver's best 25 finishes are counted toward the championship and the 2010 winner received $40,000. Points are accumulated in the three national series: sprints, midgets, and Silver Crown. Bryan Clauson of Noblesville, Indiana claimed the inaugural championship, topping runner-up Levi Jones by 14 points.

As of 2013 it has been known as the Mike Curb "Super License" National Championship Award.

USAC national drivers champions

- 2010 – Bryan Clauson; Noblesville, Indiana
- 2011 – Bryan Clauson; Noblesville, Indiana
- 2012 – Bryan Clauson; Noblesville, Indiana
- 2013 - Tracy Hines; New Castle, Indiana
- 2014 - Tracy Hines; New Castle, Indiana
- 2015 - Dave Darland; Kokomo, Indiana
- 2016 - Brady Bacon; Broken Arrow, Oklahoma
- 2017 - Justin Grant; Ione, California
- 2018 - Tyler Courtney; Indianapolis, Indiana
- 2019 - Tyler Courtney; Indianapolis, Indiana
- 2020 - Chris Windom; Canton, Illinois
- 2021 - Justin Grant; Ione, California
- 2022 - Justin Grant; Ione, California
- 2023 - Justin Grant; Ione, California
- 2024 - Logan Seavey; Sutter, California

=== 1978 plane crash ===
On April 23, 1978, returning from a race at the Trenton Speedway in New Jersey, eight USAC officials, plus the pilot, were killed when their 10-seat Piper Navajo Chieftain crashed during a thunderstorm 25 miles southeast of Indianapolis.

Killed were:

- Ray Marquette, USAC's vice-president of public affairs and a former sportswriter for The Indianapolis Star
- Frank Delroy, chairman of USAC technical committee
- Shim Malone, starter for USAC races and head of its midget racer division
- Judy Phillips, graphic artist and publication director of USAC's newsletter
- Stan Worley, chief registrar
- Ross Teeguarden, assistant technical chairman
- Don Peabody, head of the sprint division
- Dr. Bruce White, assistant staff doctor
- Don Mullendore, owner and pilot of the plane.

Arthur W Graham III, Director of Timing & Scoring, was scheduled to be on the flight, but decided last-minute to drive back with the timing equipment.

The incident closely followed the death of Indianapolis Motor Speedway owner Tony Hulman.

=== End of championship car sanctioning ===
The plane crash came at a time when Indy car owners and drivers were demanding changes from USAC. Aside from the Indianapolis 500, USAC events were not well attended, and the owners felt that USAC poorly negotiated television rights. The owners also wanted increases in payouts, especially at Indy. Though some think the plane crash was used as an opportunistic way to force change in the sport, it was merely an unfortunate coincidence. The seed of dissent had been growing for several years before the accident, and claims the crash was an immediate cause for the 1979 CART/USAC "split" are considered for the most part unfounded.

Also unpopular were the attempts of USAC to keep the aging Offenhauser engine competitive with the newer, and much more expensive, Cosworth DFX engine using boost-limiting "pop off valves" and limiting the amount of fuel that could be used.

Finally, most car owners banded together to form Championship Auto Racing Teams (CART) in 1978, with the first race to be run in 1979. USAC tried unsuccessfully to ban all CART owners from the 1979 Indianapolis 500, finally losing in court before the race began. Both the USAC and CART ran multi-race schedules in 1979.

Indianapolis Motor Speedway president John Cooper was instrumental in forming a joint body of CART and USAC with the creation of the Championship Racing League (CRL) in March 1980. However, in mid-1980, Cooper forced USAC to renounce their agreement with the CRL if they wanted to keep officiating the Indy 500. After USAC's attempt at a 500-mile race at Pocono Raceway – which was boycotted by the CART teams, forcing USAC to fill the field with Silver Crown cars – USAC and CART eventually settled into a relatively peaceful co-existence, with USAC continuing to sanction the Indianapolis 500 and no other Championship car races, and CART including the race in its schedule between other CART-sanctioned races. When the Indy Racing League (IRL) split with CART in 1996, USAC served as the sectioning body for IRL races, including the Indy 500, until terminated the sanctioning agreement following officiating errors at the 1997 Indianapolis 500 and 1997 True Value 500; subsequent Indy 500s have been sanctioned by IRL—renamed the IndyCar Series in 2003—itself.

=== Road racing expansion ===
Since 2022, the United States Auto Club has sanctioned the USF Juniors, USF2000 Championship, and USF Pro 2000 Championship series, which serve as a ladder series to Indy NXT, along with the Radical Sportscars North American Championships, Skip Barber Racing School, as well as continued sanctioning of the GT World Challenge America and Porsche Sprint Challenge North America under the newly formed Road Racing Division under the direction of Randy Hembrey.

== Active series ==
=== USAC Silver Crown Series ===
USAC Silver Crown Championship
- Category: Sprint car racing
- Country: United States
- Inaugural season: 1971
- Drivers' champion: (United States) CJ Leary
- Teams' champion: Hemelgarn Racing
- Official website: USAC Silver Crown Series

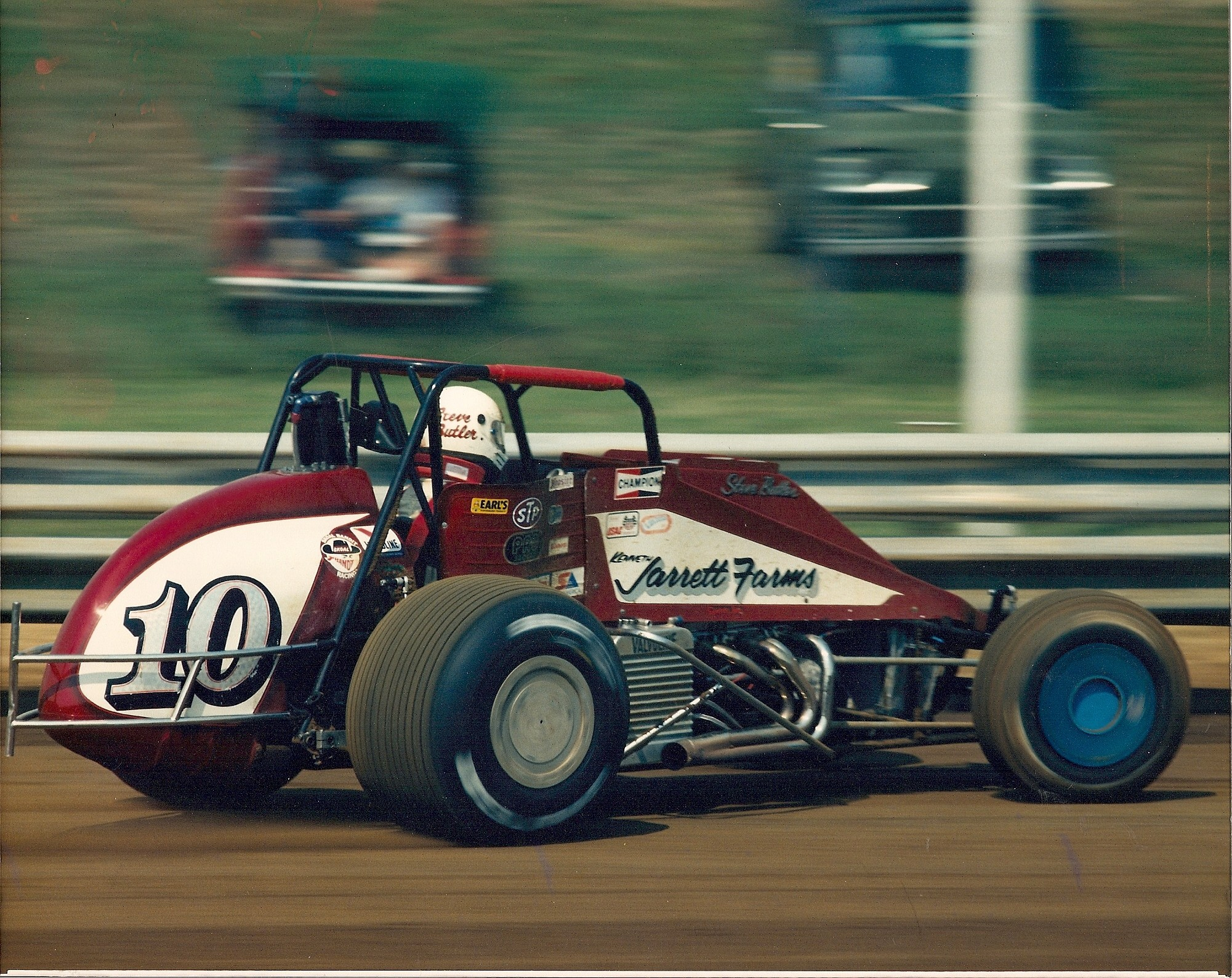
Steve Butler's 1988 Silver Crown car

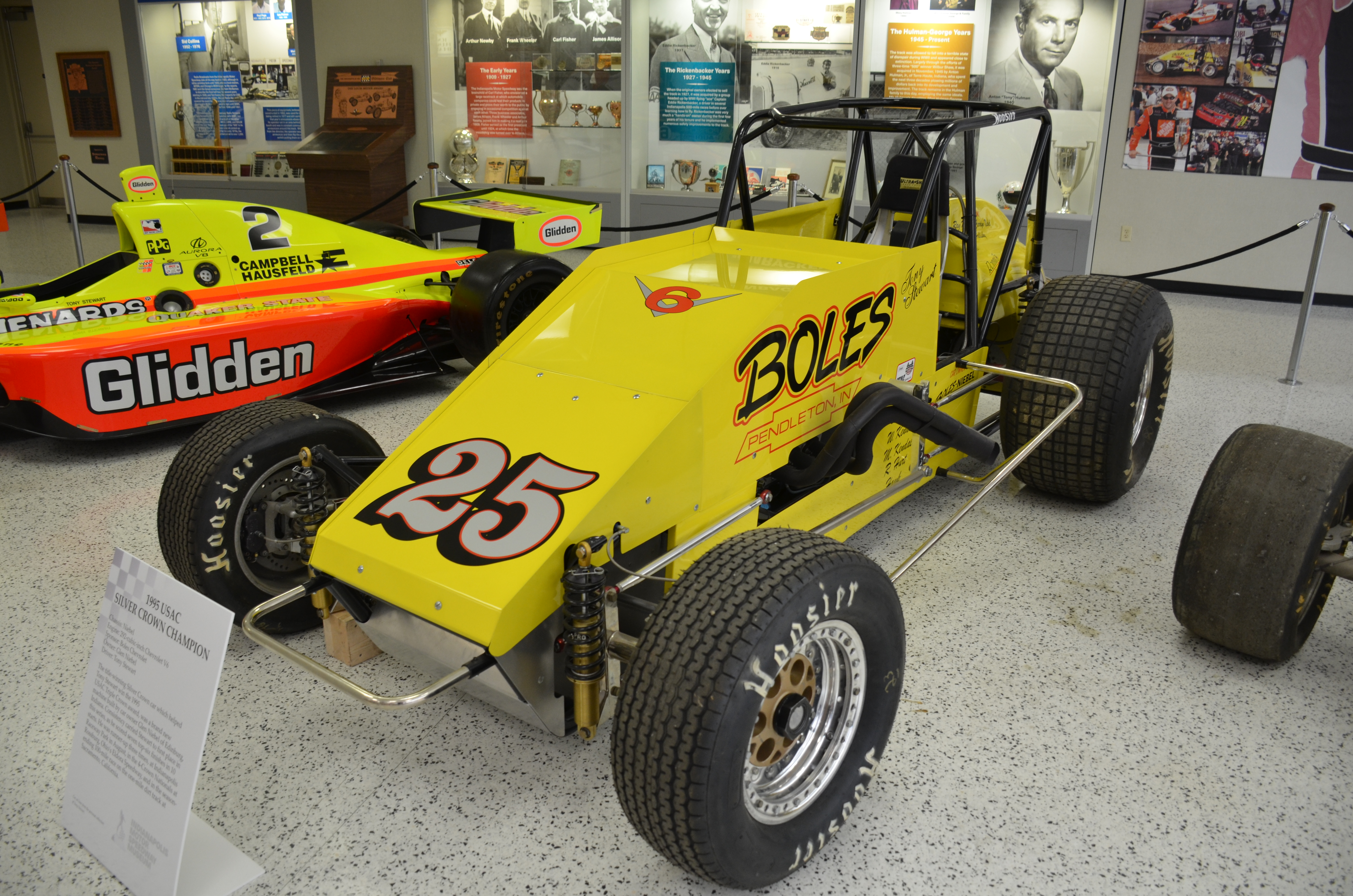
Tony Stewart's 1995 Silver Crown Championship car, part of his "Triple Crown" accomplishment

Beginning in 1971, all dirt races were split from the National Championship. From 1971 to 1980, the series was named "National Dirt Car Championship", then renamed "Silver Crown Series" in 1981.

Champions

Season	Car No.	Driver	Team
National Dirt Car Championship
1971	4	(United States) George Snider	Wilke
1972	3	(United States) A. J. Foyt	Foyt
1973	2	(United States) Al Unser	Miletich/Jones
1974	2	(United States) Mario Andretti	Miletich/Jones
1975	55	(United States) Jimmy Caruthers	Middleton
1976	29	(United States) Billy Cassella	Seymour
1977	4	(United States) Larry Rice	LeFevre
1978	21	(United States) Pancho Carter	Capels
1979	30	(United States) Bobby Olivero	Kurtz
1980	12	(United States) Gary Bettenhausen	Delrose/Holt
Silver Crown Series
1981	55	(United States) Larry Rice	Knepper
1982	39	(United States) Ken Schrader	Fortune
1983	9	(United States) Gary Bettenhausen	Delrose/Holt
1984	58	(United States) Dave Blaney	DePalma
1985	39	(United States) Rick Hood	Fortune
1986	63	(United States) Jack Hewitt	Hampshire
1987	63	(United States) Jack Hewitt	Hampshire
1988	10	(United States) Steve Butler	Jarrett
1989	30	(United States) Chuck Gurney	Kurtz
1990	54	(United States) Jimmy Sills	Consani
1991	35	(United States) Jeff Gordon	Ede
1992	10	(United States) Steve Butler	Jarrett
1993	69	(United States) Mike Bliss	McClure
1994	75	(United States) Jimmy Sills	Stanton
1995	25	(United States) Tony Stewart	Boles
1996	75	(United States) Jimmy Sills	Stanton
1997	56	(United States) Dave Darland	Foxco
1998	9	(United States) Jason Leffler	Goetz
1999	14	(United States) Ryan Newman	Ede
2000	37	(United States) Tracy Hines	Riggs
2001	10	(United States) Paul White	Cook
2002	9	(United States) J. J. Yeley	Stewart/East
2003	9	(United States) J. J. Yeley	Stewart/East
2004	9	(United States) Dave Steele	Stewart/East
2005	9	(United States) Dave Steele	Stewart/East
2006	29	(United States) Bud Kaeding	BK/Leffler
2007	29	(United States) Bud Kaeding	BK
2008	27	(United States) Jerry Coons Jr	RW
2009	29	(United States) Bud Kaeding	BK
2010	10	(United States) Levi Jones	Stewart/Curb-Agajanian
2011	10	(United States) Levi Jones	Stewart/Curb-Agajanian
2012	22	(United States) Bobby East	Stewart/Curb-Agajanian
2013	10	(United States) Bobby East	Stewart/Curb-Agajanian
2014	63	(United States) Kody Swanson	DePalma Motorsports
2015	63	(United States) Kody Swanson	DePalma Motorsports
2016	98	(United States) Chris Windom	Fred Gormly/RPM
2017	63	(United States) Kody Swanson	DePalma Motorsports
2018	63	(United States) Kody Swanson	DePalma Motorsports
2019	20	(United States) Kody Swanson	Nolen Racing
2020	91	(United States) Justin Grant	Hemelgarn Racing
2021	77	(United States) Kody Swanson	Doran Racing
2021	21	(United States) Kody Swanson	Mark Swanson Racing
2021	9	(United States) Kody Swanson	Chris Dyson Racing
2022	1	(United States) Kody Swanson	Doran-Dyson Racing
2023	22	(United States) Logan Seavey	Rice Motorsports/Abacus Racing
2024	77	(United States) Kody Swanson	Doran Binks Racing
2025	91	(United States) Justin Grant	Hemelgarn Racing
2026	21	(United States) C. J. Leary	Team AZ Racing / Petty-Rossi / Curb-Agajanian

Race winners

* As of the end of the 2022 season

Driver	Wins
Kody Swanson	37
Jack Hewitt	23
Brian Tyler	18
Dave Steele	16
J. J. Yeley	15
Dave Darland	14
Chuck Gurney	14
Jimmy Sills	12
Bobby East	11
Bobby Santos III	11
Gary Bettenhausen	10
Mike Bliss	10

=== USAC National Sprint Car Championship ===
USAC AMSOIL National Sprint Car Championship
- Category: Sprint car racing
- Country: United States
- Inaugural season: 1956
- Tire suppliers: Hoosier Racing Tire
- Drivers' champion: (United States) Kyle Cummins
- Teams' champion: Petty Performance Racing
- Official website: AMSOIL USAC National Sprint Car Series

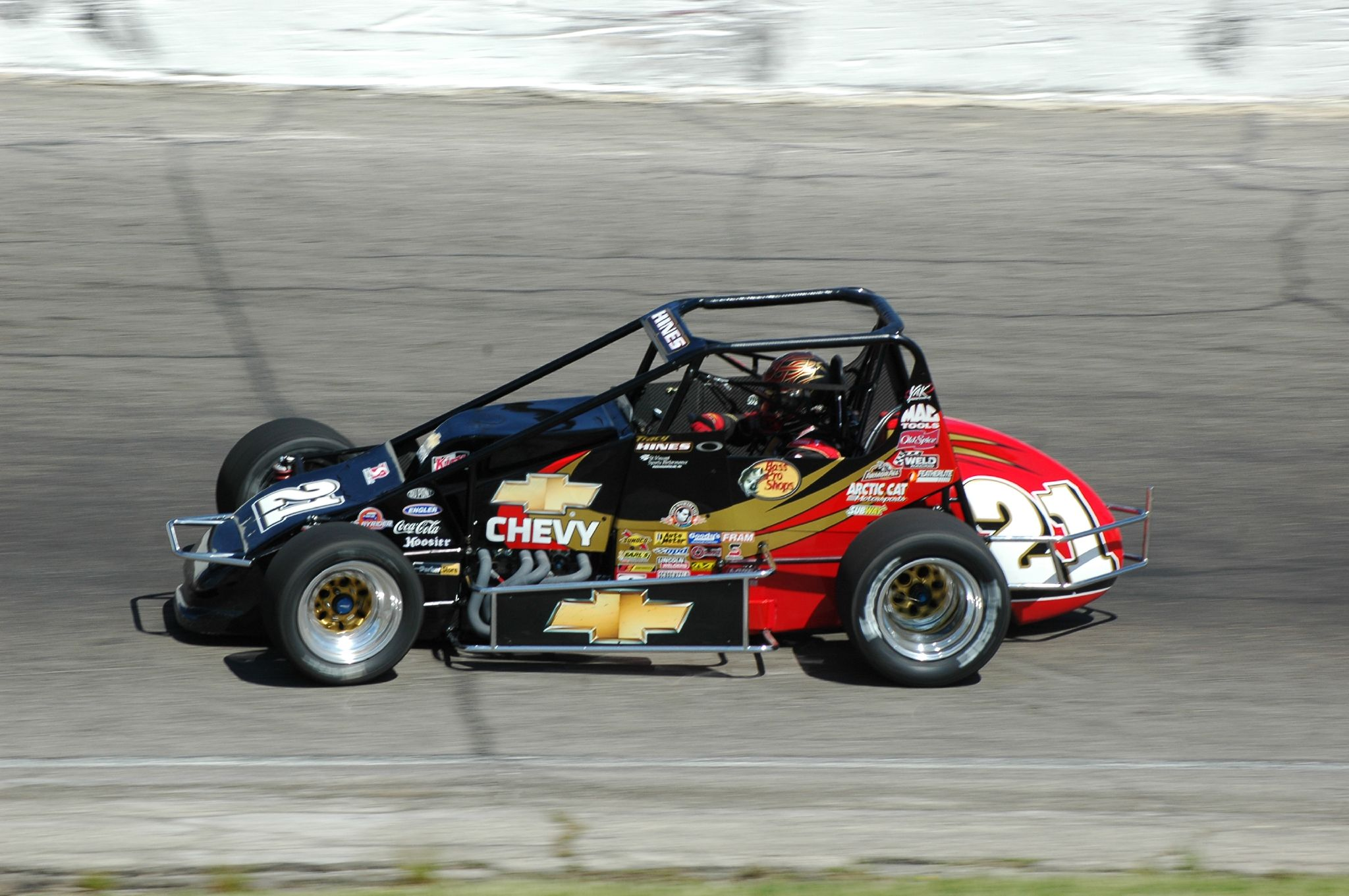
Tracy Hines' 2008 pavement sprint car (without wing)

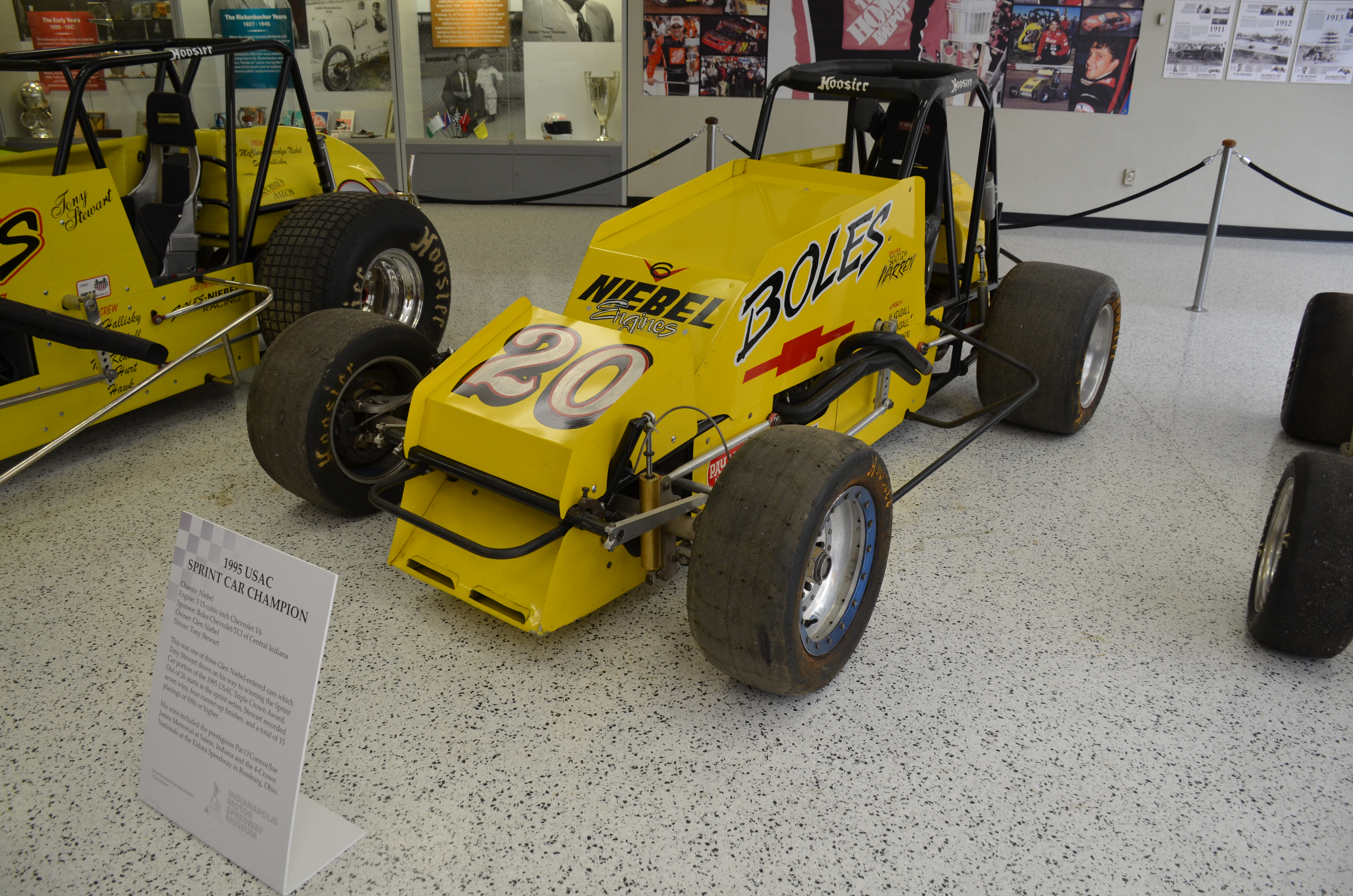
Tony Stewart's 1995 Sprint Car Championship car, part of his "Triple Crown" accomplishment

From 1956 to 1960, USAC's National Sprint Car Championship was divided into two regional divisions in the Midwest and the East.

Champions

Season	Car No.	Driver	Team
1956	9	(United States) Midwest: Pat O'Connor	Estes
1956	1	(United States) East: Tommy Hinnershitz	
1957	21	(United States) Midwest: Elmer George	Hulman
1957		(United States) East: Bill Randall	
1958	25	(United States) Midwest: Eddie Sachs	Cheesman
1958	3	(United States) East: Johnny Thomson	Traylor
1959	4	(United States) Midwest: Don Branson	Estes
1959	4	(United States) East: Tommy Hinnershitz	Pfrommer
1960	51	(United States) Midwest: Parnelli Jones	Fike
1960	2	(United States) East: A. J. Foyt	Watson
1961	1	(United States) Parnelli Jones	Fike
1962	1	(United States) Parnelli Jones	Fike
1963	2	(United States) Roger McCluskey	Homeyer
1964	3	(United States) Don Branson	Phillips
1965	9	(United States) Johnny Rutherford	Meskowski
1966	51	(United States) Roger McCluskey	Anderson
1967	92	(United States) Greg Weld	Leffler
1968	4, 27	(United States) Larry Dickson	Smith, Stapp
1969	2	(United States) Gary Bettenhausen	Davis
1970	2	(United States) George Snider	Lay
1971	2	(United States) Gary Bettenhausen	Davis
1972	4	(United States) Sammy Sessions	Amerling
1973	2	(United States) Rollie Beale	Kilman
1974	6	(United States) Pancho Carter	Stapp
1975	80	(United States) Larry Dickson	Ensign
1976	24	(United States) Pancho Carter	Stap
1977	56	(United States) Sheldon Kinser	Hammond
1978	43	(United States) Tom Bigelow	Armstrong
1979	43	(United States) Greg Leffler	Armstrong
1980	2	(United States) Rich Vogler	Seibert
1981	6	(United States) Sheldon Kinser	Leyba
1982	1	(United States) Sheldon Kinser	Leyba
1983	39	(United States) Ken Schrader	Delrose/Holt
1984	39	(United States) Rick Hood	Fortune
1985	39	(United States) Rick Hood	Fortune
1986	6	(United States) Steve Butler	Stoops
1987	1	(United States) Steve Butler	Stoops
1988	1	(United States) Steve Butler	Stoops
1989	69	(United States) Rich Vogler	Hoffman
1990	69	(United States) Steve Butler	Hoffman
1991	7	(United States) Robbie Stanley	Stanley
1992	1	(United States) Robbie Stanley	Stanley
1993	69	(United States) Robbie Stanley	Hoffman
1994	22k	(United States) Doug Kalitta	Kalitta
1995	20	(United States) Tony Stewart	Niebel
1996	4c	(United States) Brian Tyler	Contos
1997	4c	(United States) Brian Tyler	Contos
1998	2, 12	(United States) Tony Elliott	Walker/Vance, Conroy
1999	69	(United States) Dave Darland	Hoffman
2000	66	(United States) Tony Elliott	Walker
2001	76	(United States) J. J. Yeley	GT
2002	69	(United States) Tracy Hines	Hoffman
2003	20	(United States) J. J. Yeley	Stewart
2004	20	(United States) Jay Drake	Stewart
2005	2B	(United States) Levi Jones	Benic
2006	20	(United States) Josh Wise	Stewart
2007	20	(United States) Levi Jones	Stewart
2008	69	(United States) Jerry Coons Jr	Hoffman
2009	20	(United States) Levi Jones	Stewart
2010	20	(United States) Levi Jones	Stewart
2011	20	(United States) Levi Jones	Stewart
2012	7	(United States) Bryan Clauson	CTR-BCI-Curb-Agajanian
2013	20	(United States) Bryan Clauson	Stewart/Curb-Agajanian
2014	69	(United States) Brady Bacon	Hoffman
2015	12	(United States) Robert Ballou	Ballou Motorsports
2016	69	(United States) Brady Bacon	Hoffman
2017	5	(United States) Chris Windom	Baldwin Brothers
2018	7BC	(United States) Tyler Courtney	Clauson Marshall Motorsports
2019	19AZ	(United States) C.J. Leary	Reinbold/Underwood Motorsports
2020	69	(United States) Brady Bacon	Hoffman
2021	69	(United States) Brady Bacon	Hoffman
2022	4	(United States) Justin Grant	TOPP Motorsports
2023	4	(United States) Justin Grant	TOPP Motorsports
2024	57	(United States) Logan Seavey	Abacus Racing
2025	3p	(United States) Kyle Cummins	Petty Performance Racing
2026	3p	(United States) Kyle Cummins	Petty Performance Racing

Race winners

* As of the end of the 2020 season

Driver	Wins
Dave Darland	62
Tom Bigelow	52
Tracy Hines	47
Jack Hewitt	46
Larry Dickson	45
Pancho Carter	42
Bryan Clauson	41
Gary Bettenhausen	40
Sheldon Kinser	37
Jon Stanbrough	35
Rich Vogler	35
Brady Bacon	35
Rollie Beale	32
Robert Ballou	29
Tyler Courtney	29
Don Branson	28
A. J. Foyt	28
Levi Jones	28
Chris Windom	28
J. J. Yeley	28

=== USAC National Midget Championship ===
USAC NOS Energy Drink National Midget Championship
- Category: Midget car racing
- Country: United States
- Inaugural season: 1956
- Tire suppliers: Hoosier Racing Tire
- Drivers' champion: (United States) Buddy Kofoid
- Teams' champion: Curb-Agajanian
- Official website: USAC P1 Insurance National Midgets

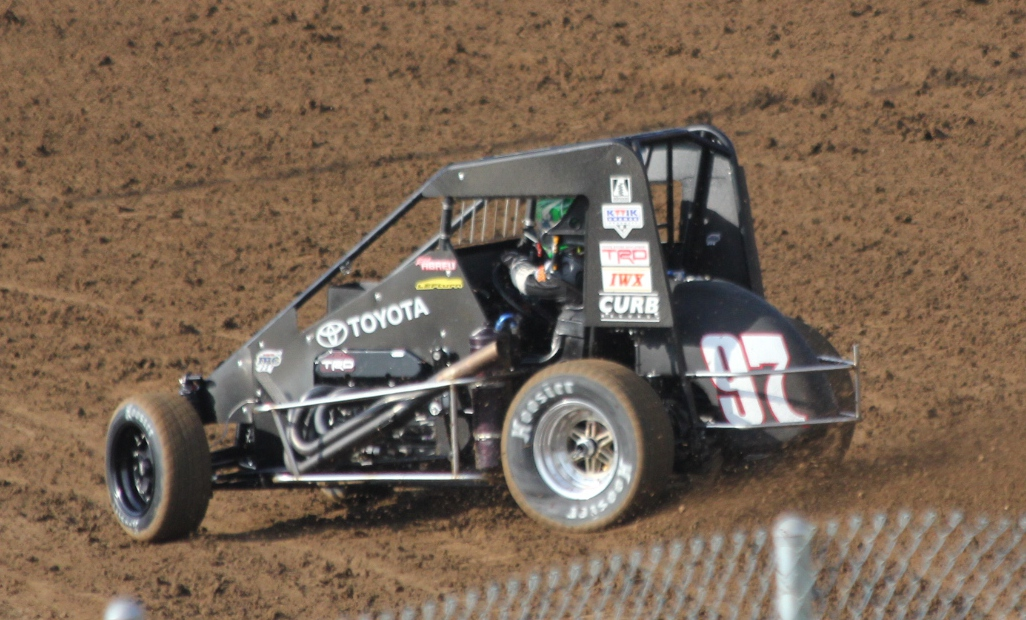
2014 USAC Midget champion Rico Abreu

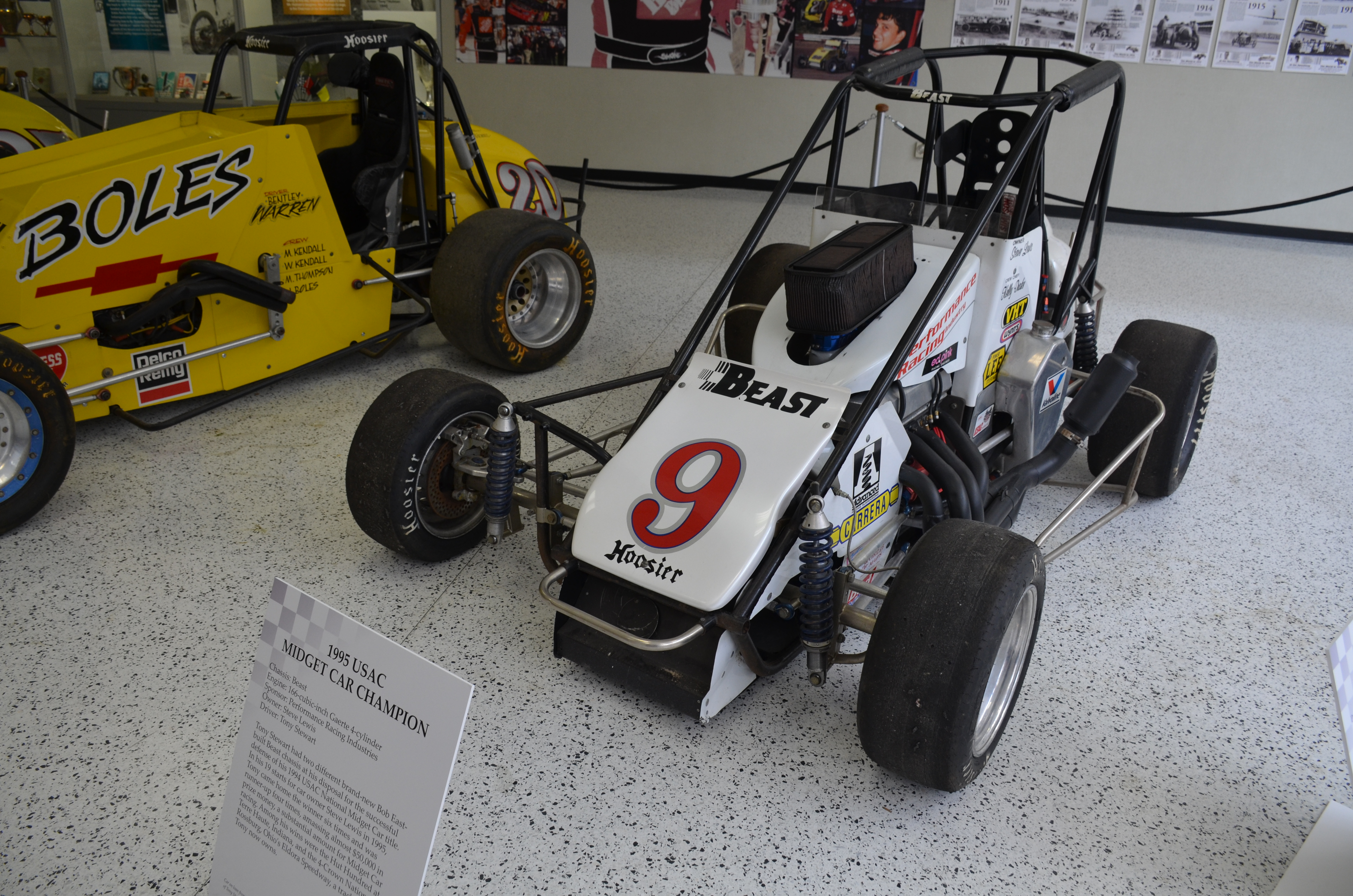
Tony Stewart's 1995 Midget Car Championship car, part of his "Triple Crown" accomplishment

Brad Sweet qualifying his midget
Brad Sweet setting fast time in qualifying for the USAC National Midget Series race at Dodge County, Wisconsin, USA in 2008— 681 kb

Champions

Season	Car No.	Driver	Team
1956		(United States) Shorty Templeman	
1957		(United States) Shorty Templeman	
1958		(United States) Shorty Templeman	
1959		(United States) Gene Hartley	
1960		(United States) Jimmy Davies	
1961		(United States) Jimmy Davies	
1962		(United States) Jimmy Davies	
1963		(United States) Bob Wente	
1964		(United States) Mel Kenyon	
1965		(United States) Mike McGreevy	
1966	1	(United States) Mike McGreevy	
1967	1	(United States) Mel Kenyon	Kenyon
1968	1	(United States) Mel Kenyon	Kenyon
1969	3	(United States) Bob Tattersall	Stroud
1970	5	(United States) Jimmy Caruthers	Caruthers
1971	5	(United States) Danny Caruthers	Caruthers
1972	81	(United States) Pancho Carter	Rieder
1973	2	(United States) Larry Rice	Shannon
1974	61	(United States) Mel Kenyon	Kenyon
1975	5	(United States) Sleepy Tripp	
1976	1	(United States) Sleepy Tripp	
1977	43	(United States) Mel Kenyon	Armstrong
1978	2	(United States) Rich Vogler	Caruthers
1979	2	(United States) Steve Lotshaw	Piascik
1980	69	(United States) Rich Vogler	Lockard
1981	61	(United States) Mel Kenyon	Kenyon
1982	5	(United States) Kevin Olson	Carey
1983	4	(United States) Rich Vogler	Streicher
1984	16	(United States) Tom Bigelow	Sandy
1985	66	(United States) Mel Kenyon	Burns
1986	2	(United States) Rich Vogler	Byrd
1987	11	(United States) Kevin Olson	Wilke
1988	1	(United States) Rich Vogler	Byrd
1989	46	(United States) Russ Gamester	Gamester
1990	4	(United States) Jeff Gordon	Helmling
1991	8	(United States) Mike Streicher	Streicher
1992	11	(United States) Stevie Reeves	Wilke
1993	9	(United States) Stevie Reeves	Lewis
1994	6	(United States) Tony Stewart	Potter
1995	9	(United States) Tony Stewart	Lewis
1996	91	(United States) Kenny Irwin Jr.	Lewis
1997	71	(United States) Jason Leffler	Willoughby
1998	9	(United States) Jason Leffler	Lewis
1999	9	(United States) Jason Leffler	Lewis
2000	91	(United States) Kasey Kahne	Lewis
2001	9	(United States) Dave Darland	Lewis
2002	9	(United States) Dave Darland	Lewis
2003	9	(United States) J. J. Yeley	Lewis
2004	9	(United States) Bobby East	Lewis
2005	20	(United States) Josh Wise	Stewart
2006	11	(United States) Jerry Coons Jr.	Wilke
2007	11	(United States) Jerry Coons Jr.	Wilke-Pak
2008	71	(United States) Cole Whitt	Kunz
2009	17B	(United States) Brad Kuhn	RW
2010	39	(United States) Bryan Clauson	Tucker/Kunz/BCI
2011	39	(United States) Bryan Clauson	CTR-Curb-Agajanian
2012	3	(United States) Darren Hagen	RFMS
2013	71	(United States) Christopher Bell	Kunz/Curb-Agajanian
2014	97	(United States) Rico Abreu	Kunz/Curb-Agajanian
2015	24	(United States) Tracy Hines	Parker Machinery
2016	67	(United States) Tanner Thorson	Kunz/Curb-Agajanian
2017	97	(United States) Spencer Bayston	Kunz/Curb-Agajanian
2018	67	(United States) Logan Seavey	Kunz/Curb-Agajanian
2019	7BC	(United States) Tyler Courtney	Clauson-Marshall Racing
2020	89	(United States) Chris Windom	Tucker/Boat Motorsports
2021	67	(United States) Buddy Kofoid	Kunz/Curb-Agajanian
2022	67	(United States) Buddy Kofoid	Kunz/Curb-Agajanian
2023	57	(United States) Logan Seavey	Abacus Racing
2024	86	(United States) Daison Pursley	CB Industries
2025	71K	(United States) Cannon McIntosh	Kunz/Curb-Agajanian

Race winners

Driver	Wins
Mel Kenyon	111
Rich Vogler	95
Bob Wente	78
Bob Tattersall	63
Sleepy Tripp	57
Jimmy Davies	48
Bryan Clauson	38
Tracy Hines	35
Gene Hartley	31
Chuck Rodee	31
Dave Darland	30
Mike McGreevy	30
Johnny Parsons	30
Kyle Larson	27
Gary Bettenhausen	27
Tony Stewart	27
Darren Hagen	25
Parnelli Jones	25
Dave Strickland	25

=== USAC/CRA Sprint Car Series ===
AMSOIL USAC/CRA Sprint Car Series
- Category: Sprint car racing
- Country: United States
- Inaugural season: 2004
- Tire suppliers: Hoosier Racing Tire
- Drivers' champion: (United States) Damion Gardner
- Teams' champion: Alexander
- Official website: AMSOIL USAC/CRA Sprint Car Series

The USAC/CRA AMSOIL Sprint Car Series debuted in 2004 utilizing the same cars and 410ci engines that race in USAC's AMSOIL National Sprint Car Championship at dirt oval tracks across California and Arizona. The series also features combination races with the AMSOIL USAC Sprint Car National Championship.

Champions

Season	Car No.	Driver	Team
2004	3	(United States) Rip Williams	Jory
2005	50	(United States) Damion Gardner	Chaffin
2006	38	(United States) Cory Kruseman	Crossno
2007	4	(United States) Tony Jones	Alexander
2008	50	(United States) Mike Spencer	Chaffin
2009	50	(United States) Mike Spencer	Chaffin
2010	50	(United States) Mike Spencer	Chaffin
2011	50	(United States) Mike Spencer	Chaffin
2012	50	(United States) Mike Spencer	Chaffin
2013	4a	(United States) Damion Gardner	Alexander
2014	4	(United States) Damion Gardner	Alexander
2015	4	(United States) Damion Gardner	Alexander
2016	4	(United States) Damion Gardner	Alexander
2017	4	(United States) Damion Gardner	Alexander
2018	4	(United States) Damion Gardner	Alexander
2019	4	(United States) Damion Gardner	Alexander
2020	No champion crowned due to the COVID-19 Pandemic		
2021	1	(United States) Damion Gardner	Alexander
2022	1	(United States) Damion Gardner	Alexander
2023	17R	(United States) Brody Roa	Tom and Christy Dunkel

=== USAC Western States Midget Series ===
Light Up The World Beverages presents the USAC Western States Midgets
- Category: Midget car racing
- Country: United States
- Inaugural season: 1982
- Tire suppliers: Hoosier Racing Tire
- Official website: USAC Western States Midgets

USAC started the Western States Midgets in 1982 utilizing the same cars & engines that race in the USAC National Midgets. The series solely races on dirt ovals across California and Arizona but in past raced on pavement ovals as well. The series does run co-sanctioned races with USAC's National Midget Series (including the historic Turkey Night Grand Prix race) and the Bay Cities Racing Association Midgets.

Champions

Season	Car No.	Driver	Team
1982		Jeff Haywood	
1983		Sleepy Tripp	
1984		Tommy White	
1985		Sleepy Tripp	
1986		Robby Flock	
1987		Sleepy Tripp	
1988		Sleepy Tripp	
1989		Robby Flock	
1990		Sleepy Tripp	
1991		Sleepy Tripp	
1992		Sleepy Tripp	
1993		Robby Flock	
1994		Johnny Cofer	
1995		Billy Boat	
1996		Jay Drake	
1997		Ricky Shelton	
1998		Rick Hendrix	
1999		Marc DeBeaumont	
2000		Wally Pankratz	
2001		Danny Ebberts	
2002		Robby Flock	
2003		Steve Paden	
2004		Johnny Rodriguez	
2005		Jerome Rodela	
2006		Jerome Rodela	
2007	87	Johnny Rodriguez	Mitchell Motorsports
2008	40	Nic Faas	Western Speed
2009	47	Garrett Hansen	Bondio
2010	25	Alex Schutte	Rodela
2011	21k	Cory Kruseman	Kruseman
2012 (Overall)	7	Shannon McQueen	McQueen
2012 (Dirt)	15	David Prickett	Neverlift
2012 (Pavement)	17n	Chad Nichols	Nichols
2013 (Overall)	68	Ronnie Gardner	Six8
2013 (Dirt)	68	Ronnie Gardner	Six8
2013 (Pavement)	29	Chad Nichols	Team 17/Eskesen
2014 (Overall)	68	Ronnie Gardner	Six8
2014 (Dirt)	68	Ronnie Gardner	Six8
2014 (Pavement)	17	Chad Nichols	Team17
2015	68	Ronnie Gardner	Six8
2016	68	Ronnie Gardner	Six8
2017	68	Ronnie Gardner	Six8
2018	9D	Michael Faccinto	Sean Dodenhoff Motorsports
2019	4D	Robert Dalby	Ken Dalby
2020		season championship cancelled	
2021	9	Blake Bower	Tony Boscacci
2022	14J	Michael Faccinto	Graunstadt Enterprises
2023	51	Brody Fuson	Rusty Carlile
2024	101	Cade Lewis	Dean Alexander

=== USAC 360 Sprint Car Series ===
USAC sanctions several regional 360 c.i.d. non-wing sprint car series across the country. USAC's West Coast Sprint Car Series was launched in 2009 by Santa Maria Speedway promoter Chris Kearns, and joined forces with USAC in 2010. The West Coast series primarily races at tracks across California while also having special event races in Nevada. USAC's Southwest Sprint Car Series was launched in 1991 as the Arizona Sprint Car Racing Association. The series joined forces with USAC in 2012. The Southwest series primarily races at tracks in Arizona, Nevada and New Mexico while also having special event races in Arkansas, Kansas & Oklahoma. The Southwest series was put on hold after the 2019 season and has not made its way back into the sport since then.

USAC and URC Sprint Car Series promoter Curt Michael joined forces to create the USAC East Coast Sprint Car Series, with the first season beginning in 2018.

Champions

Season	Car No.	Driver	Team
USAC Southwest Sprint Car Series
2013	77M	R.J. Johnson	Michael
2014	77M	R.J. Johnson	Michael
2015	77M	R.J. Johnson	Michael
2016	77M	R.J. Johnson	Michael
2017	51	R.J. Johnson	Martin
2018	50	Charles Davis Jr.	Massey Motorsports
2019	91, 34	Brody Roa	BR Performance, Grau/Burkhart

Season	Car No.	Driver	Team
USAC West Coast Sprint Car Series
2010	3S	Craig Stidham	Don & Craig Stidham
2011	10	Richard Vander Weerd	Ron Vander Weerd
2012	29	Bud Kaeding	Junior Bowman
2013	17V	Danny Faria Jr.	Danny Faria Jr.
2014	37	Matt Mitchell	Matt Mitchell
2015	17V	Danny Faria Jr.	Junior Bowman
2016	91	Brody Roa	BR Performance
2017	12	Jake Swanson	Matt Dale
2018	83	Austin Liggett	Liggett
2019	15T	Tristan Guardino	Guardino
2020	Season cancelled		
2021	33	D. J. Johnson	Johnson
2022	13	Trent Carter	Carter
2023	29T	Ryan Timmons	Timmons

Season	Car No.	Driver	Team
USAC East Coast Sprint Car Series
2018	19	Steven Drevicki	Drevicki
2019	19	Steven Drevicki	Drevicki
2020	19	Steven Drevicki	Drevicki
2021	20	Alex Bright	Hummer Motorsports
2022	5G	Briggs Danner	Heffner Racing Enterprises South
2023	39	Briggs Danner	Hogue Racing Enterprises

=== USAC Speed2 Midget Series ===
USAC formed the Speed2 Midget Series (formerly known as the Ford Focus Midget Series, Ignite Midget Series and HPD Midget Series) in 2002 with several regional divisions running across the United States on both dirt & pavement oval tracks. With exception to the engine, the cars used are the same as National & Western States Midget cars. The powerplants currently used are 4-cylinder production-based engines with stock internal dimensions to save costs for competitors. The series started out as a spec engine class, originally with Ford supplying their Zetec engine from 2002 to 2012, and then HPD supplying their K24 engine starting in 2013.

National Championship

The Speed2 Midget Series National Champion has been determined in a variety of ways. The inaugural championship, 2005, was decided by a two-race series (one dirt, one pavement). Subsequent national champions were determined by a single "national championship race" held at various locations. This format was used until 2010. In 2011, a points system was instituted to determine the national champion. Counting only a drivers twelve best finishes, the system allowed drivers from multiple regions to compete under a common points structure for a season-long championship. The 2012 season did not award a national champion, however the respective regional champions were honored at USAC Night of Champions.

National champions

- 2005: Robbie Ray; Davenport, IA;
- 2006: Michael Faccinto; Hanford, CA; Scelzi #4x
- 2007: James Robertson; Indianapolis, IN; Steele #1
- 2008: Alex Bowman; Tucson, AZ; Bowman #55
- 2009: Kyle Hamilton; Danville, IN; Steele #1
- 2010: Nick Drake; Mooresville, NC; Cline #55
- 2011: Nick Drake; Mooresville, NC; Cline #55

Regional Champions

Season	Series	Driver
2002	(No Regions)	
2003	California (North)	Josh Lakatos
2003	California (South)	Todd Hunsaker
2003	Indiana	Robbie Ray
2004	California (North)	Bradley Galedrige
2004	California (South)	Chris Rahe
2004	Carolina / Virginia	Chase Scott
2004	Midwest	Tate Martz
2004	Speedrome	Brice Kenyon
2005	California (Dirt)	Chase Barber
2005	California (Pavement)	Alex Harris
2005	Carolina / Virginia	Chase Scott
2005	Midwest	Tate Martz
2005	Northeast	Michael Sboro
2005	Oklahoma	Jasiel Randolph
2005	Speedrome	Jamie Williams
2006	California (Dirt)	Bobby Michnowicz
2006	California (Pavement)	Tim Skoglund
2006	Carolina / Virginia	Chase Scott
2006	Florida	Ryan Smith
2006	Indiana	James Robertson
2006	Midwest (Dirt)	Jordan Noblitt
2006	Midwest (Pavement)	Tate Martz
2006	Northeast	Ryan Smith
2007	California (Dirt)	Nic Faas
2007	California (Pavement)	Tim Skoglund
2007	Carolina	Tanner Swanson
2007	Indiana	Chett Gehrke
2007	Midwest	James Robertson
2007	Northeast	Jeff Abold
2007	UMARRA	Mario Clouser
2007	Utah	Tim Savage
2008	California (Dirt)	Alex Bowman
2008	California (Junior)	Charlie Butcher
2008	California (Pavement)	Ian Miille
2008	Carolinas	Bradley Riethmeyer
2008	Indiana	Kyle Hamilton
2008	Midwest	Kyle Hamilton
2008	Utah	Kipp Posey
2008	UMARA	Branden Allen
2009	California (Dirt)	Brody Roa
2009	California (Pavement)	Nik Romano
2009	California (Young Guns)	Kyle Edwards
2009	Carolina	Jeremy Frankoski
2009	Midwest	Joe Liguori
2009	UMARA	Joe Liguori
2009	Utah	Kipp Posey
2010	Eastern	Scott Hunter
2010	Eastern (Young Guns)	Jesse Little
2010	Midwest	Joe Liguori
2010	Midwest (Young Guns)	Cooper Clouse
2010	Western	Nick Carlson
2010	Western (Young Guns)	Jarid Blondel
2010	Utah	Michael Daniels
2011	DMA	Joe Krawiec
2011	Eastern	Nick Drake
2011	Eastern (Dirt)	Scott Hunter
2011	Eastern (Pavement)	Jarett Andretti
2011	Eastern (Young Guns)	Jared Irvan
2011	Midwest	Ross Rankine
2011	Midwest (Young Guns)	Sam McGhee
2011	Utah	Jim Waters
2011	Western	Brodie Kostecki
2011	Western (Young Guns)	Brodie Kostecki
2012	DMA	Kevin Chaffee
2012	Eastern	Jared Irvan
2012	Midwest (Dirt)	Ross Rankine
2012	Midwest (Pavement)	Ross Rankine
2012	Northwest	Jared Peterson
2012	Western (Dirt)	Cory Elliott
2012	Western (Pavement)	Bryant Dawson
2012	Western North	Garret Peterson
2013	DMA	Joe Krawiec
2013	Eastern	Chris Lamb
2013	Midwest (Dirt)	Gage Walker
2013	Midwest (Pavement)	Cooper Clouse
2013	Washington	Chase Goetz
2013	Western	Jarid Blondel
2013	Western (Dirt)	Cory Elliott
2013	Western (Pavement)	Bryant Dawson
2014	DMA	Adam Pierson
2014	Eastern	Scott Hunter
2014	Midwest (Dirt)	Austin Nemire
2014	Midwest (Pavement)	Austin Nemire
2014	Washington	Chase Goetz
2014	Western	Shawn Buckley
2014	Western (Dirt)	Ashley Hazelton
2015	DMA	Adam Pierson
2015	Eastern	Chris Lamb
2015	Midwest	Alex Watson
2015	Western	Cody Jessop
2015	Western (Dirt)	Shawn Buckley
2015	Western (Pavement)	Dylan Nobile
2015	Western (Restricted)	Jesse Love
2016	DMA	Adam Pierson
2016	Eastern	Chris Lamb
2016	IMRA	Jeff Mallonee
2016	Midwest Thunder	Gage Etgen
2016	Western	Jesse Love
2016	Western (Dirt)	Jesse Love
2016	Western (Pavement)	Toni Breidinger
2016	Western (Restricted)	Blake Brannon
2017	DMA	Dean Christensen
2017	Eastern	Jessica Bean
2017	Gulf Coast	Kyle Jones
2017	IMRA	Dillon Morley
2017	Midwest Thunder	Aaron Leffel
2017	Western (Overall)	Jesse Love
2017	Western (Dirt)	Jesse Love
2017	Western (Pavement)	Jesse Love
2018	DMA	Jason Goff
2018	Eastern	Jessica Bean
2018	IMRA	Andy Baugh
2018	Midwest Thunder	Aaron Leffel
2018	Western (Overall)	Adam Lemke
2018	Western (Dirt)	Tyler Slay
2018	Western (Pavement)	Adam Lemke
2019	DMA	Will Hull
2019	Eastern	Jessica Bean
2019	IMRA	Andy Baugh
2019	Midwest Thunder	Aaron Leffel
2020	DMA	Seth Carlson
2020	Eastern	Jessica Bean
2020	IMRA	Bryan Stanfill
2020	Midwest Thunder	Jacob Denney
2020	Radical Focus	Joseph Holiday

=== USAC Lightning Sprint National Championship ===
USAC started the Speedway Motors Lightning Sprint National Championship in 2017 for local tracks running Lightning Sprint cars. The points format counts the 12 best races at USAC sanctioned tracks.

=== GT World Challenge America ===
Pirelli World Challenge, was started in 1990 and switched to USAC sanctioning in 2017. The championship currently races on road and street courses across the United States and Canada with seven different classes for GT cars & Touring cars. Founded by WC Vision, the series is presently owned by SRO Group.

=== Other ===
The Stadium Super Trucks series was founded in 2013 by former NASCAR driver Robby Gordon. It is sanctioned by USAC, though Gordon and sponsorship marketing company The Elevation Group co-own the series.

The USAC also sanctions the American Rally Association, Nitro Rallycross, King of the Hammers and Great American Shortcourse.

== Former series ==
=== USAC Championship Car Series ===
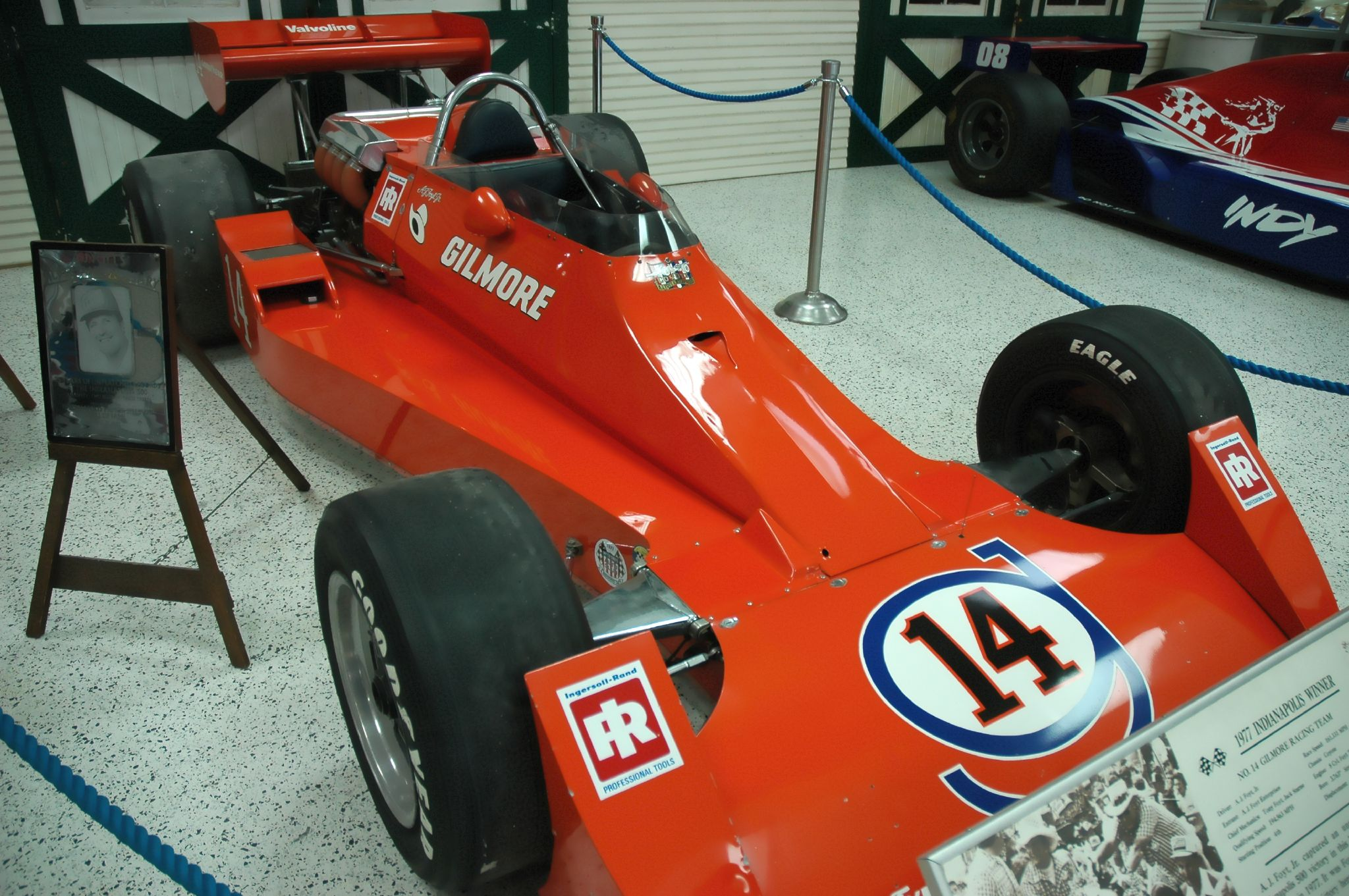
A. J. Foyt's 1977 Champ Car

USAC Championship Car Season Champions
1956	(United States) Jimmy Bryan	season
1957	(United States) Jimmy Bryan	season
1958	(United States) Tony Bettenhausen	season
1959	(United States) Rodger Ward	season
1960	(United States) A. J. Foyt	season
1961	(United States) A. J. Foyt	season
1962	(United States) Rodger Ward	season
1963	(United States) A. J. Foyt	season
1964	(United States) A. J. Foyt	season
1965	(United States) Mario Andretti	season
1966	(United States) Mario Andretti	season
1967	(United States) A. J. Foyt	season
1968	(United States) Bobby Unser	season
1969	(United States) Mario Andretti	season
1970	(United States) Al Unser	season
1971	(United States) Joe Leonard	season
1972	(United States) Joe Leonard	season
1973	(United States) Roger McCluskey	season
1974	(United States) Bobby Unser	season
1975	(United States) A. J. Foyt	season
1976	(United States) Gordon Johncock	season
1977	(United States) Tom Sneva	season
1978	(United States) Tom Sneva	season
1979	(United States) A. J. Foyt	season
1980	(United States) Johnny Rutherford	season

=== USAC Gold Crown Series ===
Starting in 1981, USAC scaled back their participation in Indy car racing outside of the Indianapolis 500. The preeminent national championship season was instead being sanctioned by CART. USAC developed a split-calendar season, beginning in June, and ending in May with the Indy 500. After 1983, however, the Gold Crown schedule would consist of only one event per season (Indy 500), and the Gold Crown title would be regarded largely as ceremonial. The winner of the Indianapolis 500 would be the de facto Gold Crown champion, as it was the lone points-paying event. The title and the "series" were retired after the 1994–1995 season with the advent of the Indy Racing League.

USAC Gold Crown Series Champions
1981–82	(United States) George Snider	season
1982–83	(United States) Tom Sneva	season
1983–84	(United States) Rick Mears	season
1984–85	(United States) Danny Sullivan	season
1985–86	(United States) Bobby Rahal	season
1986–87	(United States) Al Unser	season
1987–88	(United States) Rick Mears	season
1988–89	(Brazil) Emerson Fittipaldi	season
1989–90	(Netherlands) Arie Luyendyk	season
1990–91	(United States) Rick Mears	season
1991–92	(United States) Al Unser Jr.	season
1992–93	(Brazil) Emerson Fittipaldi	season
1993–94	(United States) Al Unser Jr.	season
1994–95	(Canada) Jacques Villeneuve	season

=== USAC Stock Cars ===
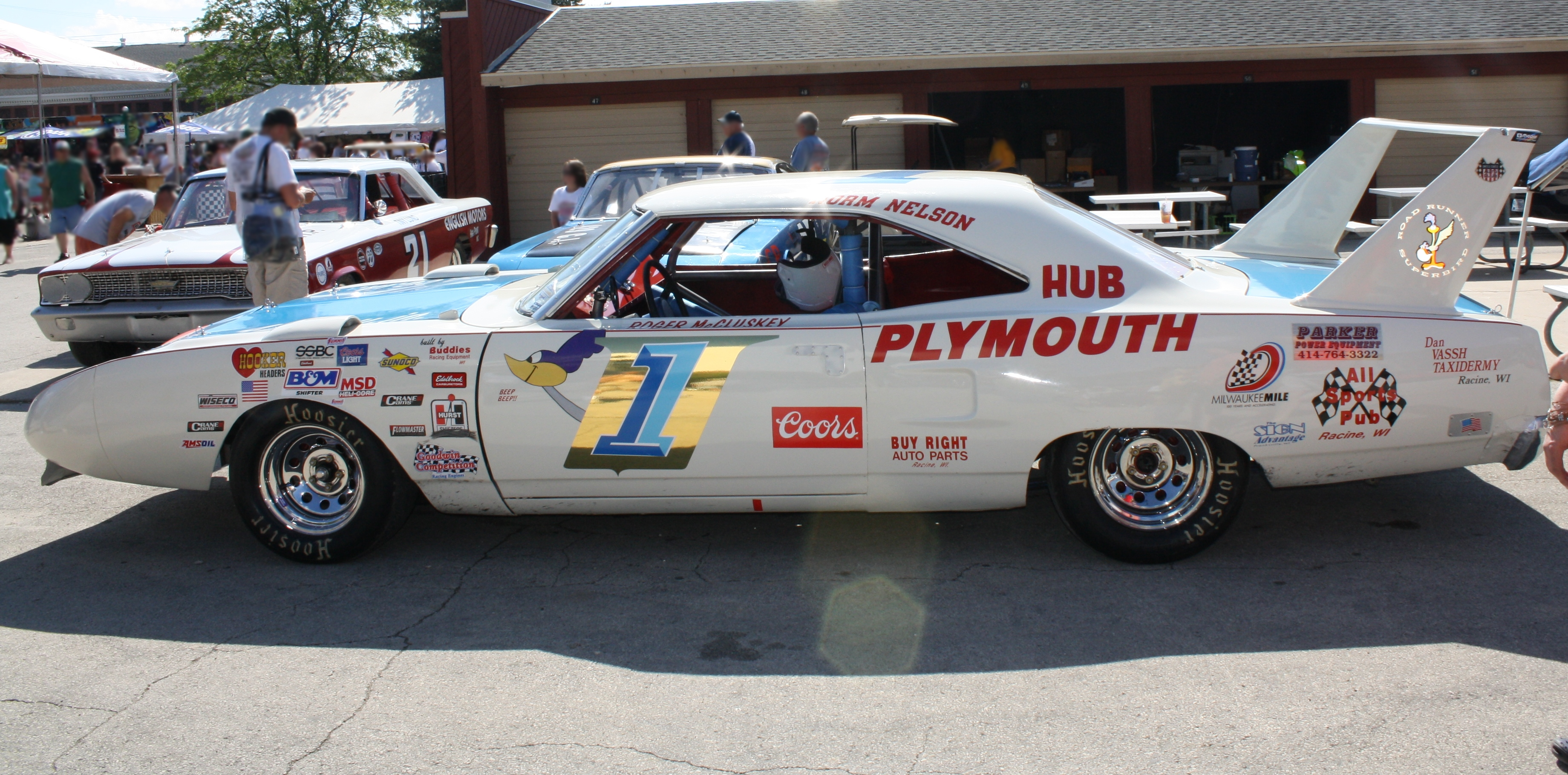
Norm Nelson's USAC Stock Car

USAC featured a stock car division from 1956 to 1984.

Past Champions
Year	Champion	2nd Place	3rd Place	Rookie Of The Year
1956*	Johnny Mantz	Marshall Teague	Les Snow	None
1957	Jerry Unser	Ralph Moody	Sam Hanks	None
1958	Fred Lorenzen	Mike Klapak	Norm Nelson	None
1959	Fred Lorenzen	Mike Klapak	Nelson Stacy	None
1960	Norm Nelson	Paul Goldsmith	Tony Bettenhausen	None
1961	Paul Goldsmith	Norm Nelson	Elmer Musgrave	None
1962	Paul Goldsmith	Don White	Norm Nelson	None
1963	Don White	A. J. Foyt	Norm Nelson	Sal Tovella
1964	Parnelli Jones	Norm Nelson	Don White	Joe Leonard
1965	Norm Nelson	Paul Goldsmith	Don White	Billy Foster
1966	Norm Nelson	Don White	Billy Foster	Butch Hartman
1967	Don White	Parnelli Jones	Jack Bowsher	Al Unser
1968	A. J. Foyt	Roger McCluskey	Don White	Dick Trickle
1969	Roger McCluskey	A. J. Foyt	Don White	Verlin Eaker
1970	Roger McCluskey	Norm Nelson	A. J. Foyt	Billy Reis
1971	Butch Hartman	Jack Bowsher	Roger McCluskey	J. Booher/B. Schroyer
1972	Butch Hartman	Roger McCluskey	Paul Feldner	Chuck McWilliams
1973	Butch Hartman	Ramo Stott	Bay Darnell	Irv Janey
1974	Butch Hartman	Norm Nelson	Ramo Stott	Ken Rowley
1975	Ramo Stott	Butch Hartman	Sal Tovella	Len Gittemeier
1976	Butch Hartman	Ramo Stott	Sal Tovella	Wayne Watercutter
1977	Paul Feldner	Ramo Stott	Sal Tovella	Dave Watson
1978	A. J. Foyt	Terry Ryan	Bay Darnell	Joe Ruttman
1979	A. J. Foyt	Bay Darnell	Rusty Wallace	Rusty Wallace
1980	Joe Ruttman	Rusty Wallace	Bay Darnell	Ken Schrader
1981	Dean Roper	Sal Tovella	Ken Schrader	Rick Hanley
1982	Dean Roper	Bay Darnell	Rick O'Brien	J. Schwister/J. Lindhorst
1983	Dean Roper	Butch Garner	Rick O'Brien	Roger Drake
1984	David Goldsberry	Ken Rowley	Jim Hall	David Goldsberry

* The inaugural season featured two subtitles: Pacific Coast (won by Sam Hanks) and Short Track (Troy Ruttman).

=== USAC Road Racing Championship ===
From 1958 until 1962, USAC sanctioned a road racing championship. It was held for sports cars from 1958 to 1961, and adopted Formula Libre rules in 1962.

Year	Champion	Car	Report
1958	(United States) Dan Gurney	Ferrari 375 Plus; Ferrari 290 MM	season
1959	(United States) Augie Pabst	Ferrari 625 TR; Scarab Mk. II-Chevrolet	season
1960	(United States) Carroll Shelby	Maserati Tipo 61; Scarab Mk. II-Chevrolet	season
1961	(United Kingdom) Ken Miles	Porsche 718 RS 61	season
1962	(United States) Roger Penske	Cooper T53-Climax	season

=== TORC: The Off-Road Championship ===
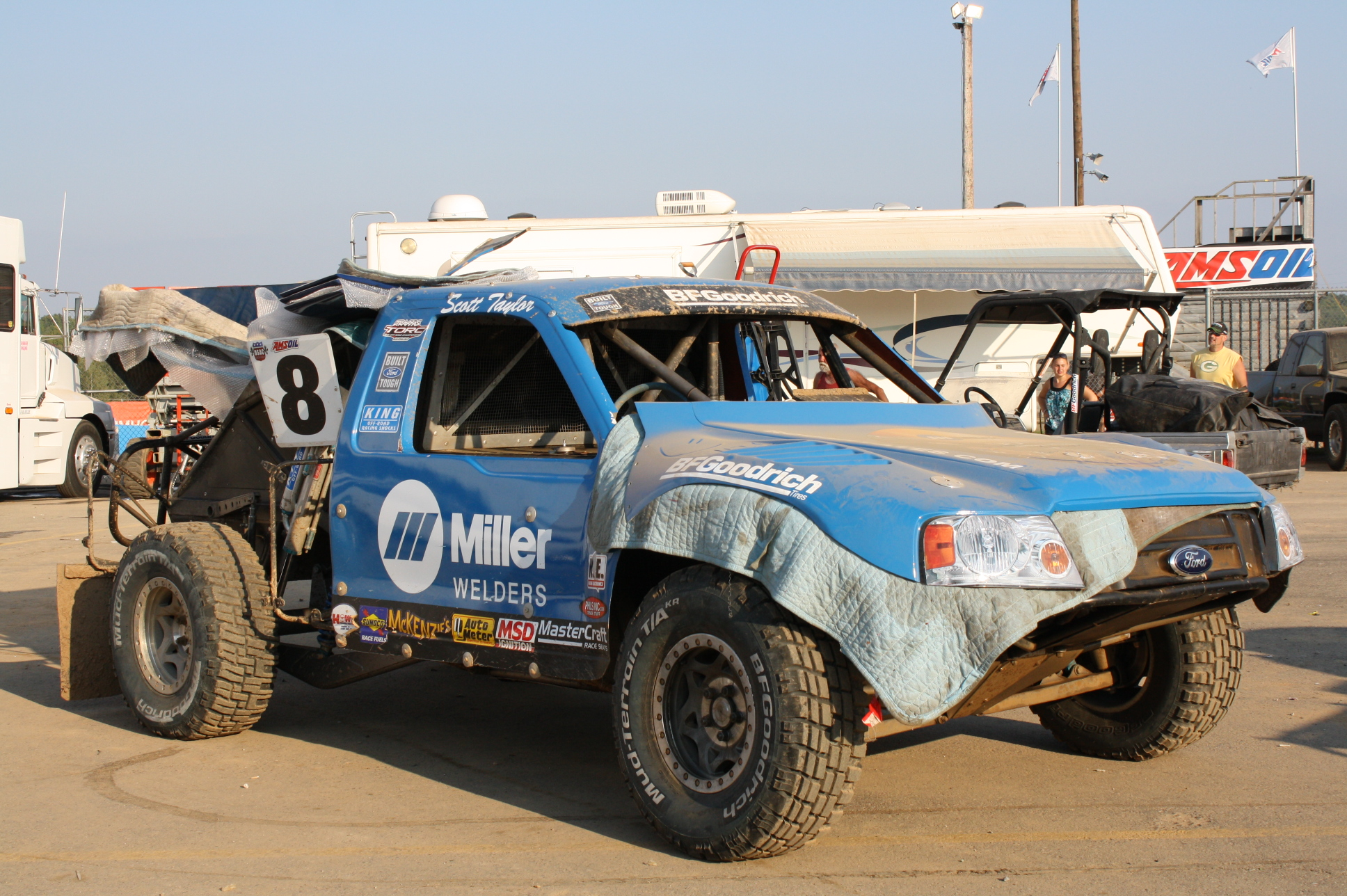
Scott Taylor's Crandon winning Pro 2 truck

TORC: The Off-Road Championship was founded in 2009 by motocross racer Rick Johnson and it was managed the race operations and officiated the events. USAC took over complete management of the series in 2010. The complete management ended in August 2013 season when it was sold to The Armory. USAC returned to officiation/race control and the series was renamed "TORC: The Off Road Championship" for 2014.

- 2009 Pro 4x4: Rick Huseman, Pro 2WD: Rob MacCachren
- 2010 Pro 4x4: Johnny Greaves, Pro 2WD: Ricky Johnson
- 2011 Pro 4x4: Ricky Johnson, Pro 2WD Bryce Menzies
- 2012 Pro 4x4: Ricky Johnson, Pro 2WD Bryce Menzies
- 2013 Pro 4x4: Johnny Greaves, Pro 2WD: Bryce Menzies
- 2014 Pro 4x4: Johnny Greaves, Pro 2WD: CJ Greaves

== See also ==
- Sports Car Club of America
- Automobile Racing Club of America
- Automobile Association of America
- Automobile Club of America
