= Belleville High Banks =

Horse racing circuit in Kansas, U.S.

World's Fastest Half Mile
- Location: North Central Kansas Fairgrounds / Republic County Fairgrounds; 9th & O St., Belleville, Kansas
- Coordinates: 39.832086°N 97.625794°W
- Opened: 1910
- Major events: Belleville Midget Nationals; Belleville 100; 305 Sprint Nationals; Belleville Dirt Nationals
- Website: bellevillehighbanks.org

Half Mile Dirt
- Surface: Dirt
- Length: 0.50 mi (0.8 km)
- Banking: 23 degrees

The Belleville High Banks is a half mile (0.8 km) dirt racing oval near Belleville, Kansas at the North Central Kansas Fairgrounds. The first recorded race happened at the track in 1910. It has held races on American Automobile Association (AAA), United States Auto Club (USAC), World of Outlaws Late Model Series and World of Outlaws Sprint cars circuits. The Belleville Midget Nationals and 305 Sprint Nationals races have been held at the track.

== History ==
A horse racing circuit was built at the Republic County, Kansas fairgrounds. The first recorded automobile race at the track was a three car battle on July 4, 1910. Somewhere between 7000 and 10000 people watched the cars race 10 laps over 7 minutes and 10 seconds. The initial track was a flat half mile track and it was reconfigured to a high banked half mile track in 1932.

The International Motor Contest Association (IMCA} held their first national race at the track in 1951; the Big Cars (now Sprint cars) was won by Frank Luptow. IMCA held a race at Belleville each year until 1960. Ernie Derr won the 1960 IMCA race. The final IMCA race was held at Belleville in 1968 and it was won by Ramo Stott.

The Big Car Racing Association (BCRA) began sanctioning the track in 1965 and lasted until 1976. The first lap time under 20 seconds happened at a BCRA race on August 23, 1968. The O’Reilly National Championship Racing Association (NCRA) has sanctioned the track for over 20 years.

The track began hosting the annual Belleville Midget Nationals in 1978. Winners of the Belleville Nationals include Christopher Bell, Bryan Clauson, Jerry Coons Jr., Dave Darland, Kasey Kahne, Kyle Larson, and Brad Sweet. After 40 years, the final Belleville Nationals was held in 2017. It was replaced by the 305 Nationals in 2018. In 2020, it was the only event held at the track.

In October 2021, the track announced their first Super Late Model race since 2008. The 7-day "Belleville Dirt Nationals" event will be held in June 2022 with $25000 to win Friday night and $50000 to win the Saturday night feature.

Bryan Clauson was attempting to race 200 races in 2016. He died the day after a crash in a midget car at the track on August 6.

== Facilities ==
The track's grandstands were a Works Progress Administration project in the 1930s. The track is more circular than most ovals. It is known for its high banking. The High Banks Hall of Fame and National Midget Auto Racing Hall of Fame Museum are located nearby.

== See also ==
- The High Banks! by Beryl Ward, L.A. Ward and Bob Mays
