= 2011 USAC Traxxas Silver Crown Series =

The 2011 USAC Traxxas Silver Crown Champ Car Series season was the 40th season of the USAC Silver Crown Series. The series began with the Sumar Classic at the Terre Haute Action Track on April 23, and ended on October 15 at the Rollie Beale Classic at Toledo Speedway. Levi Jones began the season as the defending champion and retained his title over Jerry Coons Jr. by a three point margin. It was his seventh USAC title (along with five USAC National Sprint Car titles) which tied him with Rich Vogler, A. J. Foyt, and Mel Kenyon for the most USAC open wheel titles. Jones' co-owner Tony Stewart recorded his sixth Silver Crown title and co-owner Curb Agajanian Performance Group recorded its second. Kyle Larson was the series' Rookie of the Year.

== Schedule/Results ==
No.	Date	Race title	Track	Winning driver
1	May 27	Hoosier Hundred	Indiana State Fairgrounds, Indianapolis, Indiana	Jerry Coons Jr.
2	June 18	Milwaukee 100	Milwaukee Mile, West Allis, Wisconsin	Bobby East
3	June 24	Casey's General Store USAC Challenge	Iowa Speedway, Newton, Iowa	Bobby East
4	July 3	Sumar Classic	Terre Haute Action Track, Terre Haute, Indiana	cancelled early in feature due to deteriorated track conditions
5	July 23		North Wilkesboro Speedway, North Wilkesboro, North Carolina	cancelled
6	July 28	J.D. Byrider 100	Lucas Oil Raceway at Indianapolis, Brownsburg, Indiana	Kody Swanson
7	August 20	Tony Bettenhausen 100	Illinois State Fairgrounds Racetrack, Springfield, Illinois	Brian Tyler
8	September 4	Ted Horn 100	DuQuoin State Fairgrounds Racetrack, DuQuoin, Illinois	Kyle Larson
9	September 24	4-Crown Nationals	Eldora Speedway, Rossburg, Ohio	Kyle Larson
10	October 15	Rollie Beale 150	Toledo Speedway, Toledo, Ohio	Kody Swanson

Dirt oval
Pavement oval

References: schedule

== Final Drivers Points Standings (Top 10) ==
Position	Driver	Team	Points
1	Levi Jones	Tony Stewart Racing / Curb Agajanian Performance Group	408
2	Jerry Coons Jr.	RW Motorsports	405
3	Kyle Larson (R)	Keith Kunz Motorsport	347
4	Tracy Hines	Lightfoot Racing	336
5	Brian Tyler	Team 6R	316
6	Bobby East	Klatt Motorsports	312
7	Tanner Swanson	Team 6R/TK	301
8 (tie)	Bryan Clauson	Tony Stewart Racing	269
8 (tie)	Bud Kaeding	BK Racing	269
10 (tie)	Derek Hagar	Hagar Racing	210
10 (tie)	Kody Swanson	Team 6R	210
