= 2017 USAC Silver Crown Series =

The 2017 USAC Silver Crown Champ Car Series presented by Traxxas season is the 46th season of the USAC Silver Crown Series. The series began with the Sumar Classic at the Terre Haute Action Track on April 2, and will end with the 4 Crown Nationals at Eldora Speedway on September 23. Chris Windom entered the 2017 season as the defending champion. Kody Swanson won the 2017 season championship driving for DePalma Motorsports in the #63 Maxim / Hampshire Chevrolet.

== Team and Driver chart ==
| No. | Race Driver | Car Owner / Entrant | Chassis | Engine | Rounds |
|---|---|---|---|---|---|
| 2 | Patrick Lawson | Patrick Lawson | Beast | Wesmar | 3 |
| 2v | Ryan Newman | Johnny Vance Racing | Beast | Gaerte | 1 |
| 3 | A.J. Russell | Ted Finkenbinder | Beast | Bailey Brothers Chevrolet | 2 |
| 3 | AJ Fike | RFMS Racing | Beast | Foxco | 1 |
| 4 | Joe Liguori | Liguori Racing | DRC | Kercher Chevrolet | 6 |
| 5 | J.C. Bland | Bland Brothers Enterprises | Drinan | BBE Chevrolet | 4 |
| 6 | Damion Gardner | Klatt Enterprises | Beast | Ford | 6 |
| 6 | Robert Ballou | Klatt Enterprises | Beast | Ford | 2 |
| 7 | David Shain | Hardy Boys Motorsports | Maxim | Chevrolet | 3 |
| 02 | Tanner Swanson | Bowman Racing | Beast | Kistler Chevrolet | 2 |
| 07 | Jacob Wilson | Wilson Brothers Racing | Beast | Claxton/Toyota | 4 |
| 08 | Johnny Petrozelle | Cornell-Petrozelle Racing | Beast | Stanton/Toyota | 4 |
| 12 | Brian Tyler | Galas Motorsports | Beast | Galas Chevrolet | 2 |
| 14 | Zach Daum | McQuinn Motorsports | JR-1 | Brown Chevrolet | 1 |
| 14 | Ken Schrader | McQuinn Motorsports | JR-1 | McQuinn Chevrolet | 1 |
| 15 | Shane Butler | Troy Thompson | Beast | Chevrolet | 1 |
| 15 | Troy Thompson | Troy Thompson | Beast | Chevrolet | 3 |
| 16 | Austin Nemire | Bob Lesko | Beast | Chevrolet | 5 |
| 18 | Kenny Gentry | Kenny Gentry | Beast | Chevrolet | 3 |
| 20 | Jerry Coons Jr. | Gene Nolen | Maxim | Tranter Chevrolet | All |
| 20 | Jerry Coons Jr. | Gene Nolen | Beast | Tranter Chevrolet | All |
| 21 | Jeff Swindell | Swanson Racing | Beast | Chevrolet | 2 |
| 22 | Bobby Santos III | DJ Racing | Beast | VDS Chevrolet | 5 |
| 24 | Keith Burch | Keith Burch | Beast | Kistler | 2 |
| 26 | Aaron Pierce | Sam Pierce | Beast | Chevrolet | 9 |
| 27 | Dave Darland | Carla & Steve Phillips | Phillips | Foxco Chevrolet | 4 |
| 29 | Joey Moughan | Joey Moughan | Maxim | Claxton Mopar | 2 |
| 30 | C.J. Leary | Leary-6R Racing | DRC | 1-Way Toyota | 5 |
| 31 | Dave Berkheimer | Dave Berkheimer | Drinan | Chevrolet | 3 |
| 32 | Joss Moffatt | Williams & Wright Racing | Maxim | Williams | 9 |
| 39 | Matt Goodnight | Goodnight Racing | Beast | Claxton Chevrolet | 6 |
| 40 | David Byrne | Byrne Racing | Maxim | J & D Chevrolet | All |
| 40 | David Byrne | Byrne Racing | Beast | J & D Chevrolet | All |
| 42 | Terry Babb | Terry Babb | Beast | Babb Chevrolet | 3 |
| 44 | Danny Long | Danny Long | Beast | Chevrolet | 2 |
| 48 | Brady Bacon | Paul Martens | Maxim | Kistler Chevrolet | 3 |
| 51 | Russ Gamester | Gamester Racing | GRP | Toyota | 1 |
| 53 | Steve Buckwalter | SFT Racing | Beast | Brown Chevrolet | 5 |
| 54 | Mark Smith | Mal Lane | Maxim | Williams Chevrolet | 4 |
| 55 | Casey Shuman | Patty Bateman | Beast | Foxco Chevrolet | 3 |
| 57 | Kevin Studley | Studley Motorsports | Beast | Chevrolet | 2 |
| 60 | Cody Gerhardt | Cody Gerhardt | Beast | Toyota | 1 |
| 63 | Kody Swanson | DePalma Motorsports | Maxim | Hampshire Chevrolet | All |
| 71 | Shane Cockrum | Hardy Boys Motorsports | Maxim | Brown Chevrolet | 4 |
| 75 | Bill Rose | Bill Rose Racing | Beast | Chevrolet | 5 |
| 75 | Henry Clarke | Bill Rose Racing | Beast | Chevrolet | 1 |
| 77 | Chris Urish | Chris Urish | Beast | Foxco Chevrolet | 2 |
| 80 | Toni Breidinger | Breidinger Racing | Beast | Chevrolet | 2 |
| 80 | Annie Breidinger | Breidinger Racing | Beast | Chevrolet | 2 |
| 81 | Shane Cottle | Curtis Williams | Maxim | Williams Chevrolet | 5 |
| 81 | Cody Gallogly | Curtis Williams | Big Car | Williams Chevrolet | 1 |
| 88 | Chris Fetter | Fetter Tile LLC | Beast | Foxco | 2 |
| 89 | Chris Fetter | Fetter Tile LLC | Beast | TMS Chevrolet | 2 |
| 91 | Justin Grant | Carli-Hemelgarn Racing | DRC | Speedway Ford | All |
| 91 | Justin Grant | Carli-Hemelgarn Racing | Beast | Speedway Ford | All |
| 92 | Chris Windom | Kazmark Racing | Maxim | Wallace Mopar | All |
| 92 | Chris Windom | Kazmark Racing | Beast | Ford | All |
| 95 | Patrick Bruns | Full Throttle Racing | Beast | Speedway Toyota | 4 |
| 97 | Tyler Courtney | Hans Lein | DRC | Stanton Mopar | 3 |
| 97 | Dave Darland | Hans Lein | DRC | Stanton Mopar | 1 |
| 98 | Davey Hamilton Jr. | RPM/Fred Gormly | Beast | Mopar | 4 |
| 98 | Joe Ligouri | RPM/Fred Gormly | Beast | Mopar | 1 |
| 99 | Korey Weyant | Scott Weyant | Beast | Automotive Machine | 3 |
| 99 | Davey Hamilton | RPM/Fred Gormly | Beast | Mopar | 3 |
| 99 | Tyler Courtney | RPM/Fred Gormly | Beast | Chevrolet | 1 |
| 120 | Hunter Schuerenberg | Gene Nolen Racing | Maxim | Tranter Chevrolet | 5 |
| 120 | Joe Axsom | Gene Nolen Racing | Beast | Tranter Chevrolet | 5 |
| 199 | Brady Bacon | RPM/Fred Gormly | JEI | J&D | 1 |
| 201 | Dakota Jackson | Gene Nolen Racing | Twister | Tranter | 5 |
| 201 | Tanner Swanson | Gene Nolen Racing | Twister | Tranter | 1 |

== Schedule ==
The 2017 schedule features 6 dirt ovals and 5 pavement ovals including a historic return to Phoenix International Raceway after an 8-year absence. The entire season will be broadcast on-demand by Loudpedal.TV. Select races were broadcast live by Speed Shift TV. BCSN2 broadcast the Toledo race on tape delay.

| No. | Date | Race title | Track | TV/Stream |
|---|---|---|---|---|
| 1 | April 2 | Sumar Classic | Terre Haute Action Track, Terre Haute, Indiana | Speed Shift TV Loudpedal.TV |
| 2 | April 29 | Phoenix Copper Cup | Phoenix International Raceway, Avondale, Arizona | Loudpedal.TV |
| ≠ | May 25 | Hoosier Hundred | Indiana State Fairgrounds, Indianapolis, Indiana | |
| 3 | May 26 | Carb Night Classic | Lucas Oil Raceway at Indianapolis, Clermont, Indiana | Loudpedal.TV |
| 4 | June 16 | Horn/Schindler Memorial | Williams Grove Speedway, Mechanicsburg, Pennsylvania | Speed Shift TV Loudpedal.TV |
| 5 | July 20 | Rich Vogler / USAC Hall of Fame Classic | Lucas Oil Raceway at Indianapolis, Clermont, Indiana | Loudpedal.TV |
| 6 | July 28 | Hemelgarn Racing/Super Fitness Rollie Beale Classic | Toledo Speedway, Toledo, Ohio | BCSN2 Loudpedal.TV |
| 7 | August 12 | Joe James/Pat O’Connor Memorial | Salem Speedway, Salem, Indiana | Loudpedal.TV |
| 8 | August 19 | Bettenhausen 100 | Illinois State Fairgrounds Racetrack, Springfield, Illinois | Loudpedal.TV |
| 9 | September 3 | Ted Horn 100 | DuQuoin State Fairgrounds Racetrack, DuQuoin, Illinois | Loudpedal.TV |
| 10 | September 23 | Four Crown Nationals | Eldora Speedway, Rossburg, Ohio | Loudpedal.TV |

Dirt oval
Pavement oval

=== Schedule notes and changes ===
- - the Hoosier Hundred at the Indiana State Fairgrounds Mile was canceled due to weather.

== Results and standings ==
=== Races ===
| No. | Race / Track | Winning driver | Winning team | Pole position |
|---|---|---|---|---|
| 1 | Sumar Classic | Chris Windom | Kazmark Motorsports | Kody Swanson |
| 2 | Phoenix Copper Cup | Bobby Santos III | DJ Racing | Bobby Santos III |
| 3 | Carb Night Classic | Kody Swanson | DePalma Motorsports | Kody Swanson |
| 4 | Horn-Schindler Memorial | Kody Swanson | DePalma Motorsports | Damion Gardner |
| 5 | Rich Vogler / USAC Hall of Fame Classic | Bobby Santos III | DJ Racing | Tanner Swanson |
| 6 | Hemelgarn Racing/Super Fitness Rollie Beale Classic | Bobby Santos III | DJ Racing | Kody Swanson |
| 7 | Joe James/Pat O’Connor Memorial | Kody Swanson | DePalma Motorsports | Kody Swanson |
| 8 | Bettenhausen 100 | Justin Grant | Carli-Hemelgarn Racing | Jerry Coons Jr. |
| 9 | Ted Horn 100 | Kody Swanson | DePalma Motorsports | Jerry Coons Jr. |
| 10 | Four Crown Nationals | Tyler Courtney | Hans Lein | Kody Swanson |

=== Driver points ===
1. Kody Swanson, 650
2. Jerry Coons Jr., 562
3. Chris Windom, 525
4. Justin Grant, 470
5. David Byrne, 436
6. Aaron Pierce, 402
7. Bobby Santos III, 350
8. Joss Moffatt, 302
9. Joe Liguori, 295
10. Damion Gardner, 248

=== Owner points ===
1. #63 DePalma Motorsports, 650
2. #20 Nolen Racing, 562
3. #92 Gene Kazmark, 498
4. #91 Carli-Hemelgarn Racing, 470
5. #40 Byrne Racing, 436
