= Carb Night Classic =

USAC race held in Brownsburg, Indiana

Dave Steele Carb Night Classic

USAC Silver Crown Series
- Venue: West 16th Street Speedway (1946-1958); Kokomo Speedway (1959-1961, 1965-1968); Indianapolis Speedrome (1962-1964, 1979); Indiana State Fairgrounds (1972-1973); Lucas Oil Raceway at Indianapolis (1969- 1971, 1974-1978, 1980-present)
- Location: Brownsburg, Indiana; 39°48′46″N 86°20′27″W
- First race: 1946 AAA Midgets
- First Silver Crown race: 2015
- Distance: 68.6 miles
- Laps: 100
- Previous names: Famous Night Before the 500 (1958-1960); Coca-Cola Night Before the 500 (1979); Budweiser Night Before the 500 (1989-2000); Toyota Night Before the 500 (2007); NOS Energy Drink Night Before the 500 (2010); Visit Hendricks County Night Before the 500 (2013-2014); Day Before the 500 (2015); Carb Night Classic...The Race Before the 500 (2016-17)
- Most wins (driver): Eddie Haddad (4)
- Most wins (team): Ralt of America

Circuit information
- Surface: Asphalt
- Length: 0.686 mi (1.104 km)
- Turns: 4
- Lap record: 0:19.581 (Mark Smith, Ralt RT5, 1989, Formula Super Vee)

The Dave Steele Carb Night Classic is a United States Auto Club dirt track car race held in Brownsburg, Indiana, United States, which takes place in late May before the Indianapolis 500 at the nearby Indianapolis Motor Speedway. Over its history, the event has been held at several different short tracks in Indiana, but since 1980, it has permanently been hosted at Lucas Oil Indianapolis Raceway Park in Brownsburg, Indiana. The event has long been considered one of the Indianapolis 500 traditions, along with the Hoosier Hundred and Little 500, which are also held over the same weekend at different venues in Indiana. Over the course of its history, numerous Indy 500 drivers have competed in the Night Before the 500, some winning.

For nearly 70 years, the event was better known as the Night Before the 500 and was traditionally scheduled the night immediately before the Indianapolis 500 and held under-the-lights. From its inception in 1946 through 2014, the event was held as a midget car race. In 2015, the race was switched to the USAC Silver Crown Series and held in the afternoon. In 2016, it was renamed Carb Night Classic and moved to Friday night of the Memorial Day weekend, to avoid conflicting with the Little 500 at Anderson Speedway. In 2018, the race was named after Dave Steele, a former USAC driver killed in a 2017 racing crash.

Various support races have accompanied the Midget main event including stock cars, Formula Super Vee, Formula Ford, and the Mini Indy series. Since 2010 (except in 2017), the Mazda Road to Indy U.S. F2000 and Pro Mazda racing series supported the event. The current name of the event is derived from "Carb Day", the final practice session for the Indianapolis 500, held at the Indianapolis Motor Speedway earlier in the afternoon. While the two events are not directly linked, they share a long and rich history of co-existence.

== History ==
=== 16th Street Speedway ===
The first Night Before the 500 event was held in 1946 at 16th Street Speedway (formerly Indianapolis Midget Speedway, and sometimes known as West 16th Street Speedway), a short track that was once located across the street from the Indianapolis Motor Speedway. The headline event was a double feature of Midget car racing sanctioned by the AAA Contest Board, held the night before the 1946 Indianapolis 500. The features were won by Benny Emerick and Leroy Warriner. The event quickly grew in popularity and prestige, and drew large fields of cars and large crowds.

After doubleheader features in 1946–1947, the event expanded to a tripleheader of features beginning in 1948. The three races were considered entirely separate events, each with their own practice and time trials, and occasionally a consolation race. The first race typically began around 2 p.m., the second race began around 7 p.m., and the third race (sometimes nicknames the "owl" race), began as late as 10 p.m. or even midnight. The racing typically continued well into the overnight hours, ending sometimes after 2 a.m. After the first feature, the grandstands were emptied, and the fans were required to exit the gates. After a brief wait, fans could buy tickets for the second feature, and re-enter. The process repeated after the second feature. Many spectators in attendance watched the races then walked across the street to get in line to wait for the gates to open at the Indianapolis Motor Speedway for the Indianapolis 500 the following morning.

In the first few years, the event had no official name. In 1954, the first appearance of the traditional moniker appeared, as the race was officially advertised as the "Now Famous - Night Before the 500".

The 1951 races were cancelled, then in 1952-1953 the program was changed to a single 100-lap feature. The tripleheader format returned in 1954. After 1955, AAA withdrew from automobile racing.

=== 1956–1978 ===
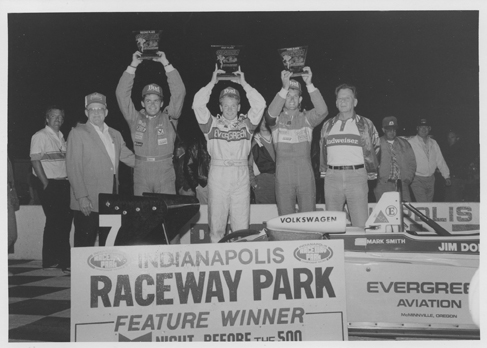
1989 Formula Super Vee race winner Mark Smith

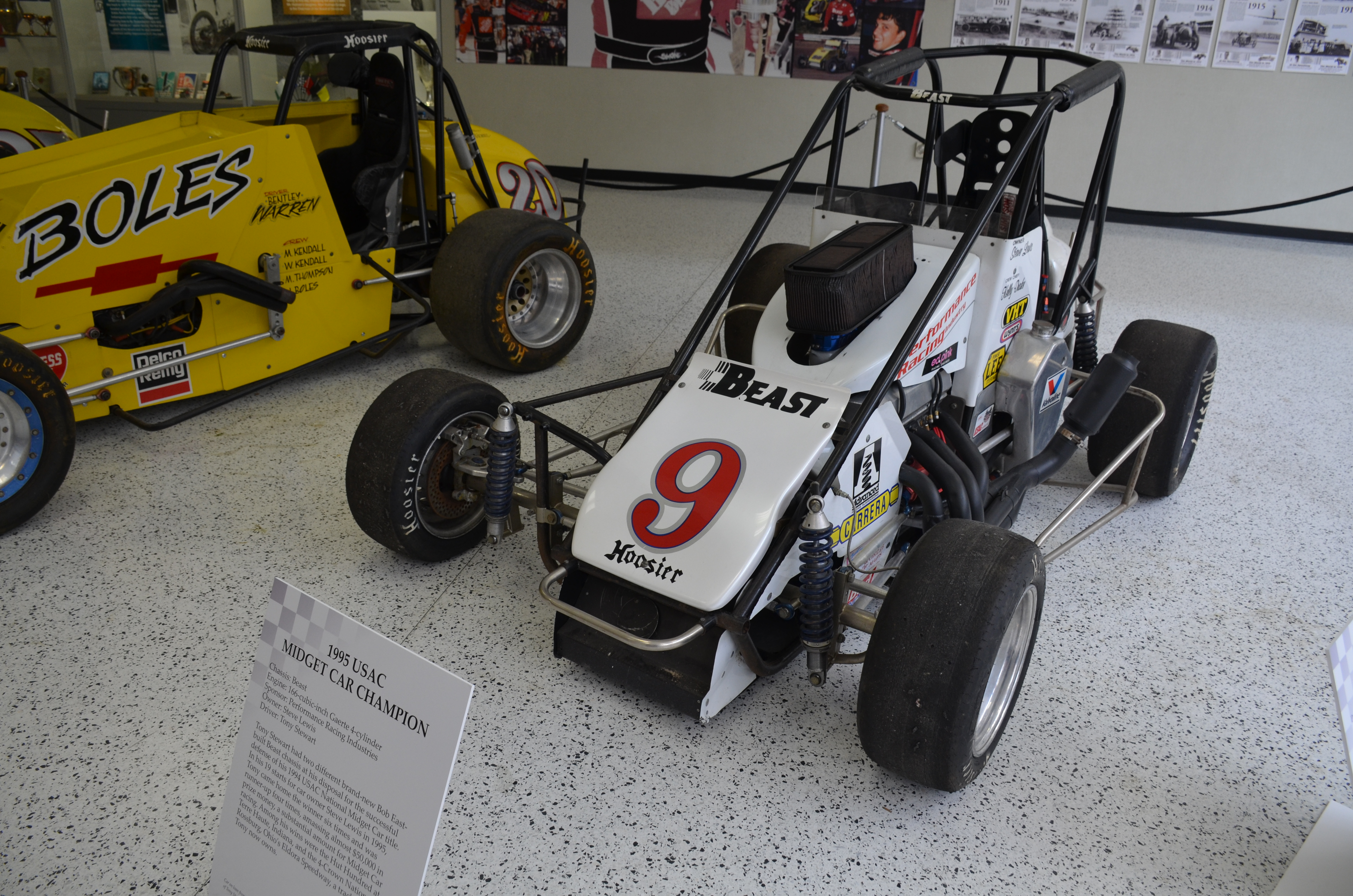
Tony Stewart finished 5th in the 1995 Night Before the 500 feature.

USAC took over sanctioning of the event beginning in 1956. The popular tripleheader format at 16th Street Speedway was maintained, and used through 1958. However, after the 1958 season, 16th Street Speedway was closed and later demolished. Over the next two decades, the event bounced around between several short tracks in Indiana. Kokomo Speedway, about an hour north of Indianapolis, held the event from 1959 to 1961, then it moved to the Indianapolis Speedrome for 1962–1964. It returned to Kokomo for 1965 to 1968, then moved to Indianapolis Raceway Park beginning in 1969.

In 1956, Shorty Templeman became the first and only driver to sweep all three features of the tripleheader in a single night. Templeman had failed to qualify for the Indianapolis 500 that year, and pocketed about $1,500 in prize money for the three-race sweep.

By 1959, the doubleheader and tripleheader formats had been mostly abandoned in favor of one longer feature. In addition, support races were filling the docket to improve the show for fans. The event moved to the Indiana State Fairgrounds oval in 1972-1973 and was held as two 50-lap features. But the 1973 Night Before the 500 was plagued by rain, much like the 1973 Indianapolis 500. The Night Before the 500 twin 50-lap Midget races were rained out on Sunday May 27 and initially rescheduled for June 17. However, a scheduling conflict saw the event rescheduled a second time until July 4 and the race was renamed the "Firecracker Fifties." On July 4, the event was cancelled due to heavy rain, and never rescheduled. After that much-maligned event, the Night Before the 500 returned to IRP the following season.

Beginning in 1974, the Indianapolis 500 was permanently moved to Sunday, which meant the Night Before the 500 races were likewise permanently moved to Saturday night each year.

During the period when the "Night Before the 500" was held at Kokomo, the Speedrome, or the Fairgrounds, IRP sometimes also held their own docket of races the same night (and vice versa). But these races were not considered part of the continuous lineage of the traditional "Night Before the 500" classic. When the races were at Kokomo, organizers regularly set up bus service from the Indianapolis Motor Speedway to Kokomo (which was about an hour to the north) in an effort to boost attendance.

=== 1979 ===
For 1979, a one-time doubleheader of two separate Midget racing events were scheduled for the same day (Saturday May 26). The first event was held at Indianapolis Raceway Park, a doubleheader of the USAC Midgets and the Formula Super Vee-based Mini Indy Series. The management at IRP decided to move their event to the daytime due to the rising cost of lighting the track. The event was billed as the Volkswagen's Day Before the 500, as the Formula Super Vee cars used Volkswagen engines. Later in the evening, a second USAC Midget event was scheduled across town at the Indianapolis Speedrome, and was held under the traditional name Coca-Cola Night Before the 500. Many USAC Midget drivers were entered for both events. Arrangements were made for the drivers to be transported from one venue to the other by police escort. The first midget event was held as scheduled at IRP, but the Super Vee event was rained out and rescheduled for Sunday evening (May 27) after the conclusion of the Indy 500. Likewise, the "Night Before the 500" midget race at the Speedrome were also rained out, and postponed until Sunday night May 27.

=== 1980–2014 ===
In 1980, IRP completed an improvement project which included new lights, and the Night Before the 500 classic was moved back to the facility permanently. In addition to the traditional Midget feature, various support races began being scheduled as part of the evening. Formula Super Vee ran at the oval for five races. Mark Smith won the race in 1989. His fastest lap of 0:19.581 is still the current track record. In 1983, Jeff Andretti won a Formula Ford race. From 2010 to 2016, the Road to Indy U.S. F2000 National Championship and Pro Mazda Championship supported the event.

During the 1980s and 1990s, several future stars of NASCAR and IndyCar headlined the event. Drivers such as Ken Schrader, Jeff Gordon, Ryan Newman, Kasey Kahne, Jason Leffler were among those with wins in the midget feature.

=== 2015 ===
Following USAC ceasing sanctioning of paved midget cars, for 2015 the event switched to the USAC Silver Crown Series. In addition, the event was moved up to Saturday afternoon in an effort to boost attendance and give fans a better opportunity to take in the event, without conflicting with the many other events of the busy racing weekend. The name of the event was changed to the Day Before the 500 and was part of four days of USAC events in the area including also the Hulman Classic, the Hoosier Hundred, and the Little 500.

=== 2016–present ===
The move to daytime was short-lived, and for 2016, the event was revamped once again. For many years the Night Before the 500 classic was held on the same night and at the same time as the Little 500, splitting fans (and some competitors) between both events. It was decided to move the event permanently to Friday night of Memorial Day weekend. Once again, it would be held under-the-lights, and it was renamed the Carb Night Classic...The Race Before the 500. The name derived from Carb Day at the Indianapolis Motor Speedway, the traditional final day of practice for the Indianapolis 500, which was earlier in the afternoon. The move made for four USAC events over four consecutive nights, leading up to the Indianapolis 500 on Sunday. The Hulman Classic would be scheduled for Wednesday night, the Hoosier Hundred Thursday night, the Carb Night Classic Friday night, and the Little 500 on Saturday night.

After former winner Dave Steele's death, the track began starting in 2018, to name the event in his memory. Due to the COVID-19 pandemic, the 2020 Indianapolis 500 was postponed to August 23, therefore the Carb Night Classic was held on August 21, whereas a revival of the Night Before the 500 race was held on August 22. The sprint races, and until 2024 the midget race, are non-championship, because USAC does not sanction midget or sprint car championship races on pavement. The midget race since 2025 is part of the All-Star National Pavement Midgets, originally four races at IRP in 2025, and expanded to eight-race Midwest-based series (Anderson, IN, Owosso, MI, Speedrome, and Plymouth, IN are the other tracks) in 2026. All-Star National Pavement rules prohibit most purpose-built Midget engines such as the modern Toyota, Honda, Stellantis, and Ford Lima engines. Engines must be production-based Ford Zetec 2000cc or Chevrolet Ecotec 2400cc, with an engine claim rule where a team may claim an engine from a podium finisher.

The 2026 race was split into two nights five weeks apart because of inclement weather scheduled for race day. The Carb Night Classic USF Championship races were moved up a day to Thursday, May 21, while the National Pavement Midget and USAC Silver Crown races were moved back 34 days to Thursday Night Thunder, on June 25, in order to beat weather expected on Friday.

== Race winners ==
=== AAA Midgets ===
From its inception in 1946 through 1955, the Night Before the 500 was part of the AAA Midgets championship.

Year	Day	Date	Winner	Location	Report
1946	Wednesday	May 29	Benny Emerick	Indianapolis Midget Speedway	
1946	Wednesday	May 29	Leroy Warriner	Indianapolis Midget Speedway	
1947	Thursday	May 29	Sam Hanks	Indianapolis Midget Speedway	
1947	Thursday	May 29	Ted Duncan	Indianapolis Midget Speedway	
1948	Sunday	May 30	Eddie Haddad	Indianapolis Midget Speedway	
1948	Sunday	May 30	Eddie Haddad	Indianapolis Midget Speedway	
1948	Sunday	May 30	Johnnie Parsons	Indianapolis Midget Speedway	
1949	Sunday	May 29	Mike O'Halloran	West 16th Street Midget Speedway	
1949	Sunday	May 29	Eddie Haddad	West 16th Street Midget Speedway	
1949	Sunday	May 29	Eddie Haddad	West 16th Street Midget Speedway	
1950	Monday	May 29	Mike Nazaruk	West 16th Street Midget Speedway	
1950	Monday	May 29	Leroy Warriner	West 16th Street Midget Speedway	
1950	Monday	May 29	Manuel Ayulo	West 16th Street Midget Speedway	
1951	Race cancelled				
1952	Thursday	May 29	Potsy Goacher	West 16th Street Midget Speedway	
1953	Friday	May 29	Johnnie Tolan	West 16th Street Midget Speedway	
1954	Sunday	May 30	Potsy Goacher	West 16th Street Midget Speedway	
1954	Sunday	May 30	Johnny Kay	West 16th Street Midget Speedway	
1954	Sunday	May 30	Tony Bonadies	West 16th Street Midget Speedway	
1955	Sunday	May 29	Eddie Sachs	West 16th Street Midget Speedway	
1955	Sunday	May 29	Forrest Parker	West 16th Street Midget Speedway	

=== USAC Midgets ===
After AAA withdrew from racing, the Night Before the 500 feature event became part of the USAC Midgets national championship series.

Year	Day	Date	Winner	Location	Report
1956	Tuesday	May 29	Shorty Templeman	West 16th Street Midget Speedway	
1956	Tuesday	May 29	Shorty Templeman	West 16th Street Midget Speedway	
1956	Tuesday	May 29	Shorty Templeman	West 16th Street Midget Speedway	
1957			Chuck Rodee	West 16th Street Midget Speedway	
1957			Len Sutton	West 16th Street Midget Speedway	
1958	Thursday	May 29	Mauri Wilson	16th Street Speedway	
1958	Thursday	May 29	Gene Force	16th Street Speedway	
1958	Thursday	May 29	Tony Bonadies	16th Street Speedway	
1959	Friday	May 29	Gene Force	Kokomo Speedway	
1960	Sunday	May 29	Jimmy Davies	Kokomo Speedway	
1961	Monday	May 29	Jimmy Davies	Kokomo Speedway	
1962	Tuesday	May 29	Jimmy Davies	Indianapolis Speedrome	
1963	Wednesday	May 29	Mel Kenyon	Indianapolis Speedrome	
1964	Friday	May 29	Chuck Rodee	Indianapolis Speedrome	
1965	Sunday	May 30	Mel Kenyon	Kokomo Speedway	
1966	Sunday	May 29	Chuck Arnold	Kokomo Speedway	
1967	Monday	May 29	Mike McGreevy	Kokomo Speedway	
1968	Wednesday	May 29	Rained out	Kokomo Speedway	
1969			Bob Wente	Indianapolis Raceway Park	
1969			Henry Pens	Indianapolis Raceway Park	
1970	Friday	May 29	Lee Kunzman	Indianapolis Raceway Park	
1971	Friday	May 28	Jimmy Caruthers	Indianapolis Raceway Park	
1972	Friday	May 27	Tom Bigelow	Indiana State Fairgrounds	
1972	Friday	May 27	Pancho Carter	Indiana State Fairgrounds	
1973	Sunday	May 27*	Rained out	Indiana State Fairgrounds	
1974	Saturday	May 25	Tommy Astone	Indianapolis Raceway Park	
1975	Saturday	May 24	Bill Engelhart	Indianapolis Raceway Park	
1976	Saturday	May 29	Bob Wente	Indianapolis Raceway Park	
1977	Saturday	May 28	Mel Kenyon	Indianapolis Raceway Park	
1978	Saturday	May 27	Rich Vogler	Indianapolis Raceway Park	
1979	Saturday	May 26	Mel Kenyon	Indianapolis Raceway Park	
1979	Sunday	May 27	Sleepy Tripp	Indianapolis Speedrome	
1979	Sunday	May 27	Jeff Nuckles	Indianapolis Speedrome	
1980	Saturday	May 24	Mel Kenyon	Indianapolis Raceway Park	
1981	Saturday	May 23	Mack McClellan	Indianapolis Raceway Park	
1982	Saturday	July 3*	Greg Leffler	Indianapolis Raceway Park	
1983	Saturday	May 28	Ken Schrader	Indianapolis Raceway Park	
1984	Saturday	May 26	Steve Lotshaw	Indianapolis Raceway Park	
1985	Saturday	May 25	Nick Fornoro Jr.	Indianapolis Raceway Park	
1986	Saturday	May 24	Sam Isenhower	Indianapolis Raceway Park	
1987	Saturday	May 23	Nick Fornoro Jr.	Indianapolis Raceway Park	
1988	Saturday	May 28	Jack Calabrase	Indianapolis Raceway Park	
1989	Saturday	May 27	Jeff Gordon	Indianapolis Raceway Park	
1990	Saturday	May 26	Jeff Gordon	Indianapolis Raceway Park	
1991	Saturday	May 25	Mike Fedorcak	Indianapolis Raceway Park	
1992	Saturday	May 23	Doug Kalitta	Indianapolis Raceway Park	
1993	Saturday	May 29	Mike Bliss	Indianapolis Raceway Park	
1994	Saturday	May 28	Ted Hines	Indianapolis Raceway Park	
1995	Sunday	May 28*	Andy Michner	Indianapolis Raceway Park	
1996	Saturday	May 25	Kenneth Nichols	Indianapolis Raceway Park	
1997	Saturday	May 24	Ryan Newman	Indianapolis Raceway Park	
1998	Sunday	May 24*	Dave Steele	Indianapolis Raceway Park	
1999	Saturday	May 29	Ryan Newman	Indianapolis Raceway Park	
2000	Saturday	May 27	Kasey Kahne	Indianapolis Raceway Park	
2001	Sunday	May 27*	Kasey Kahne	Indianapolis Raceway Park	
2002	Saturday	May 25	Jason Leffler	Indianapolis Raceway Park	
2003	Saturday	May 24	Aaron Fike	Indianapolis Raceway Park	
2004	Saturday	May 29	Ron Gregory	Indianapolis Raceway Park	
2005	Saturday	May 28	Michael Lewis	Indianapolis Raceway Park	
2006	Saturday	May 27	Bobby Santos III	Indianapolis Raceway Park	
2007	Saturday	May 26	Kevin Swindell	O'Reilly Raceway Park at Indianapolis	
2008	Saturday	May 24	Bobby East	O'Reilly Raceway Park at Indianapolis	
2009	Saturday	May 23	Chuck Gurney Jr.	O'Reilly Raceway Park at Indianapolis	
2010	Saturday	May 29	Tanner Swanson	O'Reilly Raceway Park at Indianapolis	
2011	Saturday	May 29	Darren Hagen	Lucas Oil Raceway at Indianapolis	
2012	Saturday	May 26	Tracy Hines	Lucas Oil Raceway at Indianapolis	
2013	Saturday	May 26	Darren Hagen	Lucas Oil Raceway at Indianapolis	
2014	Saturday	May 24	Tracy Hines	Lucas Oil Raceway at Indianapolis	

=== USAC Silver Crown Series (Carb Night Classic) ===
Beginning in 2015, the headlining event switched to the USAC Silver Crown. The race moved to Friday nights starting in 2016. In 2023, the event took the Hoosier Hundred name, reviving the Hoosier Hundred event after it was cancelled following its 2020 running at the Indiana State Fairgrounds. The race length was increased to 146 scheduled laps (100 miles (160 km)).

Year	Day	Date	Winner	Sanction	Location	Report
2015	Saturday	May 23	Tanner Swanson	USAC Silver Crown	Lucas Oil Raceway at Indianapolis	
2016	Friday	May 27	Tanner Swanson	USAC Silver Crown	Lucas Oil Raceway at Indianapolis	
2017	Friday	May 26	Kody Swanson	USAC Silver Crown	Lucas Oil Raceway at Indianapolis	
2018	Friday	May 25	Kody Swanson	USAC Silver Crown	Lucas Oil Raceway at Indianapolis	
2019	Friday	May 24	Kyle Hamilton	USAC Silver Crown	Lucas Oil Raceway at Indianapolis	
2020	Friday	August 21*	Tanner Swanson	USAC Silver Crown	Lucas Oil Raceway at Indianapolis	
2021	Saturday	May 29*	Kody Swanson	USAC Silver Crown	Lucas Oil Raceway at Indianapolis	
2022	Friday	May 27	Bobby Santos III	USAC Silver Crown	Lucas Oil Indianapolis Raceway Park	
2023	Friday	May 26	Bobby Santos III	USAC Silver Crown	Lucas Oil Indianapolis Raceway Park	
2024	Saturday	May 25*	Kody Swanson	USAC Silver Crown	Lucas Oil Indianapolis Raceway Park	

=== Notes ===
- 1973: The twin 50-lap Midget races were rained out on Sunday May 27 and initially rescheduled for June 17. However, a scheduling conflict saw the event rescheduled a second time until July 4 and the race was renamed the "Firecracker Fifties." On July 4, the event was cancelled due to heavy rain, and never rescheduled.
- 1979: For 1979, a doubleheader of two separate Midget racing events were scheduled for the same day (Saturday May 26). The first event was held at Indianapolis Raceway Park, a doubleheader of the USAC Midgets and the Mini Indy Series. The event was billed as the "Day Before the 500". Later in the evening, a second USAC Midget event was scheduled across town at the Indianapolis Speedrome, and was held under the traditional name "Night Before the 500." Most USAC Midget drivers were entered for both events. The first midget event was held as scheduled at IRP, but the Formula Super Vee event was rained out and rescheduled for Sunday evening May 27 after the Indianapolis 500.
- 1982: Race rained out on Saturday May 29 and rescheduled for July 3.
- 1995: Race rained out on Saturday May 27 and rescheduled for Sunday May 28.
- 1998: Race rained out on Saturday May 23 and rescheduled for Sunday May 24.
- 2001: Race rained out on Saturday May 26 and rescheduled for Sunday May 27.
- 2020: Race delayed and rescheduled for August 21 due to COVID-19 pandemic
- 2021: Race rained out on Friday May 28 and rescheduled for Saturday May 29.
- 2024: Race rained out on Friday May 24 and rescheduled for Saturday May 25.

== Support races ==
Year	Winner
Formula Super Vee
1979	Ken Nichols
1985	Mike Hooper
1986	Didier Theys
1987	E. J. Lenzi
1988	Mike Smith
1989	Mark Smith
Star Mazda
1997	Tony Buffomante
1998	Tony Buffomante
Pro Mazda/Pro 2000
2010	Conor Daly
2011	Connor De Phillippi
2012	Connor De Phillippi
2013	Matthew Brabham
2014	Garett Grist
2015	Weiron Tan
2016	Patricio O'Ward
2018	Parker Thompson
2019	Danial Frost
2020	Kody Swanson
2021	Christian Rasmussen
2022	Louis Foster
2023	Salvador de Alba
2024	Braden Eves

Year	Winner
Pro Formula Ford
1983	Jeff Andretti
1984	Steve Ice
Formula Ford 2000
1992	Greg Tracy
1993	Clay Collier
1994	Anthony Lazzaro
1995	Memo Gidley
1996	Allen May
2000	Aaron Justus
2001	Piero Rodarte
2002	Tom Dyer
U.S. F2000
2010	Patrick McKenna
2011	Petri Suvanto
2012	Spencer Pigot
2013	Neil Alberico
2014	Aaron Telitz
2015	Jake Eidson
2016	Anthony Martin
2018	Kyle Kirkwood
2019	Cameron Shields
2020	Christian Rasmussen
2021	Michael d'Orlando
2022	Michael d'Orlando
2023	Mac Clark
2024	Tanner DeFabis

Stock cars
Year	Winner
2001	Matt Lux (Baby Grands)
2002	Danny Trent (Baby Grands)
2002	Keith Tolf (Legacy cars)
2003	Danny Trent (Baby Grands)
2003	Chris Tomasik (CARS Super Trucks)
2003	Wes Bullock (CARS late models)
2004	Troy Turner (Baby Grands)
2004	Neil McCleland (Legacy cars)
2004	Tommy St. John (CARS Super Trucks)
2004	Tim Ewers (CARS late models)
2005	Tom Miller (trucks)
2005	Steve Balir (cars)
2006	Joe Hill (trucks)
2006	Stuart Quakenbush (cars)
2007	Keith Lyons (trucks)
2007	Quay Gregory (cars)
USA Modifieds
2002	Kyle Jones
2003	Rodney Scott
2004	Mike Stacy
2005	Harold Scott
2006	Bob Curry
2007	Tony Dager
Mid-American Stock Car Series
2017	Dan Gilster
