= 2016 USAC Silver Crown Series =

The 2016 USAC Silver Crown Champ Car Series season was the 45th season of the USAC Silver Crown Series. The series began with the Sumar Classic at the Terre Haute Action Track on April 3, and ended with the 4 Crown Nationals at Eldora Speedway on September 24. Kody Swanson entered the 2016 season as the defending champion, and Chris Windom was the season champion.

== Schedule/Results ==
No.	Date	Race title	Track	Winning driver
1	April 3	Sumar Classic	Terre Haute Action Track, Terre Haute, Indiana	C.J. Leary
2	April 30	Hemelgarn Racing/Super Fitness Rollie Beale Classic	Toledo Speedway, Toledo, Ohio	rained out
3	May 26	Hoosier Hundred	Indiana State Fairgrounds, Indianapolis, Indiana	Kody Swanson
4	May 27	Carb Night Classic / The Race Before the 500	Lucas Oil Raceway at Indianapolis, Clermont, Indiana	Tanner Swanson
5	June 10	Horn/Schindler Memorial	Williams Grove Speedway, Mechanicsburg, Pennsylvania	Chris Windom
6	June 25	Vatterott College Silver Crown Showdown	Gateway Motorsports Park, Madison, Illinois	Tanner Swanson
7	July 21	Rich Vogler/USAC Hall of Fame Classic	Lucas Oil Raceway at Indianapolis, Clermont, Indiana	Kody Swanson
8	August 13	Joe James/Pat O'Connor Memorial	Salem Speedway, Salem, Indiana	Kody Swanson
9	August 20	Bettenhausen 100	Illinois State Fairgrounds Racetrack, Springfield, Illinois	rained out
10	September 3	Ted Horn 100	DuQuoin State Fairgrounds Racetrack, DuQuoin, Illinois	Chris Windom
11	September 24	Four Crown Nationals	Eldora Speedway, Rossburg, Ohio	Chris Windom

Dirt oval
Pavement oval

== Teams/Drivers ==
No.	Driver(s)	Team/Entrant	Chassis	Engine	Round(s)
0	Mitch Wissmiller	Matt Barker	Beast	Chevrolet	1
2	Patrick Lawson	Patrick Lawson	DRC	Wesmar/Chevrolet	5
2	Patrick Lawson	Patrick Lawson	Beast	Wesmar/Chevrolet	5
3	AJ Fike	RFMS Racing	Beast	Foxco	2
5	J.C. Bland (R)	Bland Brothers Enterprises	Drinan	BBE/Chevrolet	3
6	Bryan Clauson	Klatt Enterprises	Beast	Ford	3
7	Neil Shepherd (R)	Neil Shepherd		Claxton/Toyota	3
8	Justin Grant	Chris Carli	DRC	Claxton/Chevrolet	All
8	Justin Grant	Chris Carli	Beast	Claxton/Chevrolet	All
00	Terry Babb	Terry Babb	Beast	Chevrolet	3
02	Tanner Swanson	Bowman Racing	Beast	Kistler/Chevrolet	3
07	Jacob Wilson	Wilson Brothers Racing	Beast	Claxton/Toyota	5
12	Brian Tyler	Galas	Beast	Galas/Chevrolet	1
14	Robert Ballou	McQuinn Motorsports	JR-1	Chevrolet	1
14	Brian Tyler	McQuinn Motorsports	JR-1	Chevrolet	1
14	Zach Daum	McQuinn Motorsports	JR-1	Chevrolet	1
16	Tad Roach	Dr. Jim Logan	Beast	Cadillac	2
17	Dave Darland	Michael Dutcher Motorsports	Beast	Toyota	3
18	Kenny Gentry	Gentry	Beast	Gentry/Chevrolet	2
20	Jerry Coons Jr.	Nolen Racing	Maxim	Tranter/Chevrolet	All
20	Jerry Coons Jr.	Nolen Racing	Beast	Tranter/Chevrolet	All
21	Robert Stout (R)	Bowman/Armstrong Racing	Beast	Kistler	1
21	Ryan Newman	Bowman/Armstrong Racing	Beast	Kistler	1
21	Jeff Swindell	Swanson/Hewitt Motorsports	Beast	Chevrolet	2
23	Terry James	Todd Satterthwaite	Magnum	Chevrolet	3
25	Davey Ray	Eddie Sachs Racing	Beast	Team RAYPRO/Chevrolet	2
26	Aaron Pierce	Sam Pierce	Beast	Pierce/Chevrolet	5
27	Billy Puterbaugh Jr.	Phillips Motorsports	Phillips	Foxco/Chevrolet	3
27	Matt Goodnight	Phillips Motorsports	Phillips	Foxco/Chevrolet	1
29	Joey Moughan (R)	Moughan Racing	Maxim	Claxton/Mopar	2
30	C.J. Leary	Leary/6R Racing	DRC	Claxton/Toyota	4
31	Dave Berkheimer (R)	Berkheimer Racing	Drinan	Chevrolet	1
40	David Byrne	Byrne Racing	Beast	J&D/Chevrolet	7
44	Danny Long	Danny Long	Beast	Chevrolet	2
48	Brady Bacon	Paul Martens	Maxim	Kistler/Chevrolet	4
51	Russ Gamester	Gamester Racing	GRP	Toyota	1
52	Billy Pauch Jr. (R)	Bob Lesko	Beast	Chevrolet	1
53	Steve Buckwalter	SET Racing	Beast	Brown/Chevrolet	4
55	Casey Shuman (R)	Bateman Racing	Beast	Chevrolet	All
55	Casey Shuman (R)	Bateman Racing	Predator	Chevrolet	All
58	Joe Liguori (R)	Ralph Liguori	DRC	Kercher/Chevrolet	3
63	Kody Swanson	DePalma Motorsports	Maxim	Hampshire/Chevrolet	All
66	Bill Rose	Rose	Beast	Claxton	1
71	Shane Cockrum	Hardy Boys Racing	Maxim	Brown/Chevrolet	All
71	Shane Cockrum	Hardy Boys Racing	Beast	Stanton/Chevrolet	All
77	Chris Urish	Urish	Beast	Foxco/Chevrolet	2
81	Shane Cottle	Curtis Williams	Maxim	Chevrolet	All
81	Shane Cottle	Curtis Williams	Beast	Williams/Chevrolet	All
84	Tad Roach	Scott Spivey	Stealth	Chevrolet	3
86	Jackie Burke	Burke	Shores	Chevrolet	1
88	Chris Fetter	Fetter Tile	Beast	TMS/Chevrolet	3
89	Chris Fetter	Fetter Tile	Beast	TMS/Chevrolet	3
90	John Heydenreich	BBH Motorsports	Beast	Brannan-Pink/Chevrolet	1
91	Austin Nemire	Hemelgarn Racing	J&J	Ford	All
91	Austin Nemire	Hemelgarn Racing	Beast	Speedway/Ford	All
98	Chris Windom	Fred Gormly/RPM	Maxim	J&D	All
98	Chris Windom	Fred Gormly/RPM	Beast	J&D/Mopar	All
99	Mark Smith (R)	Fred Gormly/RPM	JEI	Foxco/Chevrolet	2
99	Joe Liguori (R)	Fred Gormly/RPM	Beast	Gaerte/Chevrolet	4
120	Hunter Schuerenberg (R)	Nolen Racing	Maxim	Tranter/Chevrolet	2
120	Joe Axsom (R)	Nolen Racing	Beast	Tranter/Chevrolet	2
122	Bobby Santos III	DJ Racing	Beast	BVDS/Chevrolet	3
157	Kevin Studley (R)	Studley Motorsports	Beast	Chevrolet	1
201	Dakota Jackson	Nolen Racing	Twister	Tranter/Chevrolet	1

== Standings ==
=== Drivers ===
1. Chris Windom, 588
2. Kody Swanson, 583
3. Justin Grant, 474
4. Jerry Coons Jr., 465
5. David Byrne, 398
6. Casey Shuman, 386
7. Shane Cottle, 381
8. Austin Nemire, 340
9. Joe Liguori, 316
10. Brady Bacon, 268

=== Owners ===
1. #63 DePalma Motorsports, 583
2. #98 RPM/Fred Gormly, 540
3. #8 Chris Carli, 474
4. #20 Nolen Racing, 465
5. #40 Byrne Racing, 398
