= 2019 USAC Silver Crown Series =

The 2019 USAC Silver Crown Champ Car Series was the 48th season of Silver Crown racing under the USAC banner. The season began with the Memphis 100 at Memphis International Raceway on March 23, and ended with the 4 Crown Nationals at Eldora Speedway on September 28. The original 12-race season for 2019 was to be an equal split of races on dirt and asphalt however as the season progressed, two dirt races were rained out and unable to be rescheduled so the final tally was six asphalt races and four dirt races. The 2019 season also featured full-season broadcast coverage on FloSports. Kody Swanson entered the 2019 season as the defending champion.

== Team and driver chart ==
No.	Race driver	Car owner / entrant	Chassis	Engine	Rounds
15	Chad Kemenah	Hampshire / Lamme			6
17	Chris Windom	Goodnight / Byrd Racing			All
20	Kody Swanson	Nolen Racing			All

=== Driver and team changes ===
- DePalma Motorsports' No. 63 will not compete in 2019 after a five-year streak of owners titles with Kody Swanson.
- Nolen Racing will move to a single car operation with Kody Swanson for 2019.
- Chris Windom will move to Goodnight / Byrd Racing for the 2019 season with Scott Benic as crew chief. The team features a partnership with Matt Goodnight & Jonathan Byrd's Racing.
- Derek Bischak is slated to run all six pavement races in 2019.
- Dallas Hewitt is slated to compete in all six dirt races in 2019.
- Winged sprint car driver Chad Kemenah is slated to compete in all six dirt races for Bob Hampshire and Clark Lamme in 2019.
- Davey Hamilton Jr. was slated to compete the entire 2019 season for Davey Hamilton Racing. Kevin Thomas Jr. & Jason Conn also joined the team for 2019. After his arrest, it is unclear whether the team will still field a ride for Davey Jr.

== Schedule and results ==
The 2019 schedule featured twelve races, with an equal split of six races each on dirt and asphalt. Later that changed to ten races due to weather cancellations. The entire season featured live and on-demand coverage on FloRacing.

No.	Date	Race title	Track	Winner	TV/stream
1	March 23	Memphis 100	Memphis International Raceway, Memphis, TN	Kody Swanson	FloRacing
≠	April 14	Fatheadz Eyewear Sumar Classic	Terre Haute Action Track, Terre Haute, IN	Rained out	FloRacing
2	April 27	Hemelgarn Racing/Super Fitness Rollie Beale Classic	Toledo Speedway, Toledo, OH	Kody Swanson	FloRacing
3	May 23	Hoosier Hundred	Indiana State Fairgrounds Mile, Indianapolis, IN	Tyler Courtney	FloRacing
4	May 24	Dave Steele Carb Night Classic	Lucas Oil Raceway at Indianapolis, Clermont, IN	Kyle Hamilton	FloRacing
5	June 14	KRS Graphics presents the USAC Silver Crown Series (Horn-Schindler Memorial)	Williams Grove Speedway, Mechanicsburg, PA	Brady Bacon	FloRacing
6	June 24	Bytec Dairyland 100	Madison International Speedway, Madison, WI	Kody Swanson	FloRacing
7	August 10	Joe James/Pat O’Connor Memorial	Salem Speedway, Salem, IN	Kody Swanson	FloRacing
≠	August 17	Bettenhausen 100	Illinois State Fairgrounds Racetrack, Springfield, IL	Rained out	FloRacing
8	September 1	Ted Horn 100	DuQuoin State Fairgrounds Racetrack, DuQuoin, IL	Jacob Wilson	FloRacing
9	September 7	Rich Vogler Classic	Lucas Oil Raceway at Indianapolis, Clermont, IN	Kody Swanson	FloRacing
10	September 28	Four Crown Nationals	Eldora Speedway, Rossburg, OH	Brady Bacon	FloRacing

Dirt oval
Pavement oval
- - ≠ Race was postponed or canceled

=== Schedule notes and changes ===
- Memphis International Raceway returns to the schedule for the first time since 2004. The series attempted to return in 2014, but the race was canceled due to inclement weather.
- Williams Grove Speedway returns to the schedule after a year hiatus.

== Standings ==
=== Drivers ===
1. Kody Swanson, 638
2. Justin Grant, 578
3. David Byrne, 489
4. Eric Gordon, 418
5. Chris Windom, 397
6. Kyle Hamilton, 381
7. Bobby Santos, 378
8. Kevin Thomas, Jr., 366
9. Mike Haggenbottom, 357
10. Kyle Robbins, 355

=== Owners ===
1. #6 Klatt Enterprises, 637
2. #20 Nolen Racing, 613
3. #91 Hemelgarn Racing, 578
4. #40 Byrne Racing, 489
5. #78 Armstrong-Slinkard Racing, 418

== See also ==
- 2019 USAC AMSOIL National Sprint Car Championship
- 2019 USAC NOS Energy National Midget Championship
