= 2015 USAC Traxxas Silver Crown Series =

The 2015 USAC Traxxas Silver Crown Champ Car Series season was the 44th season of the USAC Silver Crown Series. The series began with the Hemelgarn Racing/Super Fitness Rollie Beale Classic at the Toledo Speedway on May 1, and ended on October 10 at New York State Fairgrounds. Kody Swanson began the season as the defending champion and retained his title.

== Schedule/Results ==
No.	Date	Race title	Track	Winning driver
1	May 1	Hemelgarn Racing/Super Fitness Rollie Beale Classic	Toledo Speedway, Toledo, Ohio	Kody Swanson
2	May 21	Hoosier Hundred	Indiana State Fairgrounds, Indianapolis, Indiana	Kody Swanson
3	May 23	Night before the 500	Lucas Oil Raceway at Indianapolis, Clermont, Indiana	Tanner Swanson
4	June 20	USAC Silver Crown 100	Iowa Speedway, Newton, Iowa	Bobby Santos III
5	July 2	Sumar Classic	Terre Haute Action Track, Terre Haute, Indiana	Shane Cockrum
6	July 23	JD Byrider Rich Vogler Classic 100	Lucas Oil Raceway at Indianapolis, Clermont, Indiana	Tanner Swanson
7	July 31	Hustle on the High Banks	Belleville High Banks Speedway Fairgrounds, Belleville, Kansas	Chris Windom
8	August 22	Bettenhausen 100	Illinois State Fairgrounds Racetrack, Springfield, Illinois	Kody Swanson
9	September 6	Ted Horn Memorial 100	DuQuoin State Fairgrounds Racetrack, DuQuoin, Illinois	Shane Cockrum
10	September 26	34 Annual Four Crown Nationals	Eldora Speedway, Rossburg, Ohio	Christopher Bell
11	October 10	Salt City 78	New York State Fairgrounds, Syracuse, New York	Kody Swanson

Dirt oval
Pavement oval
