= 2022 USAC Silver Crown Series =

51st USAC Silver Crown season

The 2022 USAC Silver Crown Champ Car Series was the 51st season of Silver Crown racing under the USAC banner. The season began with the Sumar Classic at Terre Haute Action Track on May 1 and ended at Lucas Oil Indianapolis Raceway Park on October 22. The entire season was featured live and on-demand on FloRacing. Kody Swanson won his seventh USAC Silver Crown title.

== Schedule and results ==
The 2022 schedule featured eleven points paying races (with one special non points event and the 4-Crown Nationals night one being practice and qualifying only). Five of the points races were dirt races, while the other six races as well as the non points Thursday Night Thunder Homecoming were on paved ovals. The August 20 Tony Bettenhausen 100 was postponed to October 15th due to heavy rain on race morning, and the September 3rd Ted Horn 100 was postponed to September 5th, also due to rain.

No.	Date	Race title	Track	Winner	TV/stream
1	May 1	Sumar Classic	Terre Haute Action Track	Justin Grant	FloRacing
2	May 27	Carb Night Classic	Lucas Oil Indianapolis Raceway Park	Bobby Santos III	FloRacing
3	June 18	Open Wheel Madness	Port Royal Speedway	Logan Seavey	FloRacing
4	June 24	Bytec Dairyland 100	Madison International Speedway	C.J. Leary	FloRacing
NC	June 30	Thursday Night Thunder Homecoming	Lucas Oil Indianapolis Raceway Park	Kody Swanson	FloRacing
5	July 21	Rich Vogler Classic presented by The Pallet Builder	Winchester Speedway	Kody Swanson	FloRacing
6	August 6	Hemelgarn Racing/Super Fitness Rollie Beale Classic 100 fueled by Marco's Pizza	Toledo Speedway	Kody Swanson	FloRacing
7	August 19	Gateway 100	World Wide Technology Raceway	Kody Swanson	FloRacing
8	September 5	Ted Horn 100	Du Quoin State Fairgrounds	Logan Seavey	FloRacing
9	September 23-24	4 Crown Nationals	Eldora Speedway	Logan Seavey	FloRacing
10	October 15	Tony Bettenhausen 100	Illinois State Fairgrounds	Shane Cockrum	FloRacing
11	October 22	Howard Companies Championship Saturday	Lucas Oil Indianapolis Raceway Park	Tanner Swanson	FloRacing

Dirt oval
Pavement oval

== Standings ==
=== Drivers ===
1. Kody Swanson, 668
2. Logan Seavey, 627
3. C.J. Leary, 599
4. Brian Tyler, 518
5. Justin Grant, 517
6. Travis Welpott, 404
7. Bobby Santos III, 332
8. Kyle Robbins, 325
9. Gregg Cory (R), 319
10. Taylor Ferns, 255

=== Owners ===
1. #1 Doran-Dyson Racing, 668
2. #222 Rice Motorsports, 627
3. #6 Klatt Enterprises, 599
4. #81 BCR Group, 518
5. #91 Hemelgarn Racing, 517
6. #18 Welpott Racing, 404
7. #22 DJ Racing, 332
8. #7 KR Racing, 325
9. #32 Williams Racing, 319
10. #155 Taylor Ferns Racing, 255
