= Leroy Warriner =

American racing driver

Leroy Earl Warriner (March 1, 1919 – January 2, 2003) was an American racing driver from Indianapolis who attempted to qualify for the Indianapolis 500 every year from 1951 to 1958 without succeeding. Warriner only managed to qualify for a single Championship Car race, the September 1953 race at the Indiana State Fairgrounds where he started and finished 18th. He retired from racing in 1962 then owned the Indianapolis Speedrome with Gene Hartley until 1977. An accomplished midget car racer, he was inducted into the National Midget Auto Racing Hall of Fame.
