= Indianapolis Speedrome =

Motorsport venue in Indianapolis, Indiana, US

Kitley Speedrome

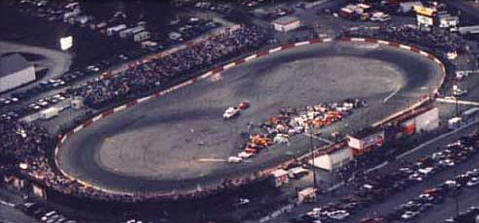
- Location: Indianapolis, Indiana
- Coordinates: 39.7574841°N 86.0558009°W
- Capacity: 6,000
- Address: 802 S. Kitley Avenue Indianapolis, IN 46219
- Opened: September 9, 1941; 84 years ago
- Former names: Art Zipp's Speedway
- Major events: World Figure 8 Championships; Carb Night Classic (1962-1964, 1979)
- Website: www.speedrome.com

Oval
- Surface: Paved
- Length: 0.322 km (0.200 mi)
- Turns: 4

Figure 8
- Surface: Paved
- Length: 0.322 km (0.200 mi)
- Turns: 4

The Indianapolis Speedrome is the oldest operating figure 8 track in the United States as it opened in 1941. It is believed by many historians that this is the first figure 8 track where cars intersect.

The Speedrome is home to the World Figure 8 Championships, the Annual Spring Shootout, and the 3 Hour Endurance Race.

The Speedrome is the USAC's most active track with 496 events held, and also produced Tony Stewart’s maiden USAC win on August 9, 1991.

== History ==
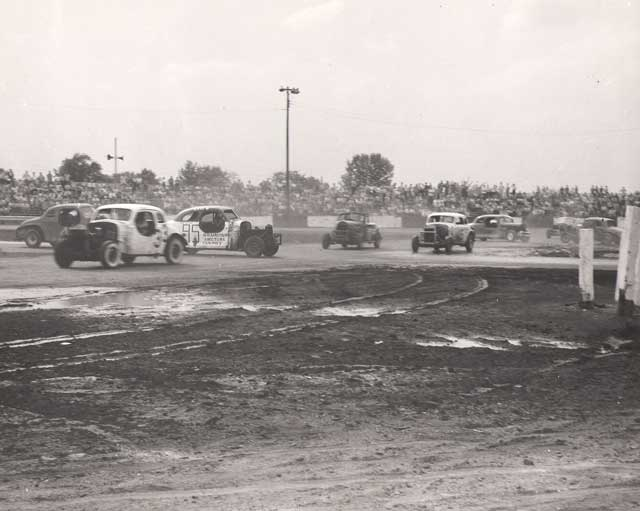
Figure 8 racing late 1940s at the Indianapolis Speedrome

== Events ==
=== Carb Night Classic ===
The Speedrome hosted the carb night classic from 1962 to 1964 and then once again in 1979.

=== World Championship 3-Hour Figure-8 Endurance Race ===
The three-hour figure 8 world championship is an annual three-hour endurance race featuring late models. Created and conceived by the owner of the Indianapolis Speedrome, John Stiles. The inaugural 3-Hour Figure-8 was an open competition, allowing Figure-8 drivers from other race tracks around the country to compete in the race.

Champions
Year	Champion
1977	Jim Fox
1978-82	Kenny St John
1983	Wayne Arnold
1984	Bobby Ellett
1985	Wayne Arnold
1986	Rance Harmon
1987	Mike St John
1988	Leonard Basham
1989	Wayne Arnold
1990-91	Mike St John
1992	Duane Lee
1993-94	Jack Dossey Jr
1995	Duane Lee
1996-99	Jack Dossey Jr
2000	Bruce Tunny
2001	Bobby Douthitt
2002	Curtis McMurtrey
2003	Bill Tunny Jr
2004-05	Bruce Tunny
2006	Curtis McMurtrey
2007	Doug Greig
2008	Fred Bear Jr
2009	Ben Tunny
2010	RJ Norton Jr
2011	Doug Greig
2012	Ben Tunny
2013	Mark Tunny
2014	Danny Smith
2015	Ben Tunny
2016	Austin Tunny
2017	Mike Hadley Jr
2018	Mark Tunny
2019	Eddie VanMeter
2020	Jesse Tunny
2021	Ben Tunny
2022	Mark Tunny
2023	Austin Tunny
2024	Mark Tunny

== The death of Don Vogler ==
On May 1, 1981, Don Vogler and his son Rich Vogler were registered for a USAC midget car feature. Don was about to complete his final warm up lap when he suddenly collided with the wall on turn 3, flipping over the concrete barrier and coming to rest in the catch fence. He was seen gripping his chest before the accident by multiple witnesses. He was pronounced dead in a local hospital a few hours later from blunt force trauma. The cause of accident is believed to be a heart attack. His son later raced in IndyCar and NASCAR but died in 1990 at Salem Speedway.

== Job Corps riot of 1965 ==
During a Saturday night race in 1965 there were 35 Job Corps men and youths invited as special guests for that night's race. The Job Corps members were siting in the back of a pickup truck, when they started yelling obscenities at women entering the restroom. Later, 15 of the youths were standing by the restroom and continued to yell obscenities at race goers until the spectators confronted and attempted to silence the youths. While the youth were being finally escorted out they began throwing sticks and stones into the crowd. A woman suffered lacerations to her arms.

== COVID-19 guideline violations ==
On October 3, 2020, a picture of the Speedrome at full capacity surfaced on the media. At this time, the COVID-19 pandemic restrictions in place in Marion County had a guideline requiring that all sporting events were to be held at 25% capacity. The Speedrome was fined $1000.

== See also ==
- List of attractions and events in Indianapolis
