= Jerry Coons Jr. =

American racing driver (born 1972)

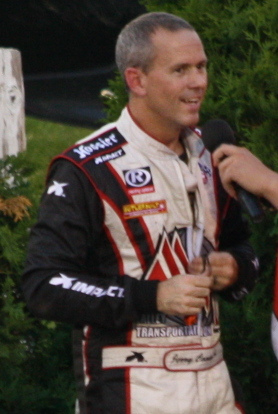
Jerry Coons Jr. in victory lane at Angell Park Speedway in 2013

Jerry Coons Jr. (born April 21, 1972) is an American racecar driver. He currently competes in the United States Auto Club sprint car, midget, and Silver Crown divisions. He is one of only six drivers to win the USAC Triple Crown, with championships in the USAC Sprint Car, Midget, and Silver Crown divisions. At the close of the 2017 season, Coons has nineteen USAC Midget wins, seventeen USAC Sprint Car wins, and seven USAC Silver Crown wins.

== Racing career ==
=== Short Track Racing ===
Coons began his racing career at the age of five, driving quarter midgets with his father Jerry, Sr.

In the late 1980s, Coons began racing midget cars at the age of fourteen in and around Arizona racetracks such as Manzanita Speedway, Raven Raceway, and El Paso Speedway Park. In 1987, he finished second in Arizona USAC Midget points, with one win at the Pima County Fairgrounds track and four second-place finishes.

In 1992, Coons was named track champion at El Paso Speedway Park, with 475 points from nine races.

At the Belleville Midget Nationals in 1996, Coons caught attention by winning the Friday night preliminary feature over Billy Boat, driving for car owner Rusty Kunz. He repeated as Friday night prelim winner at the same event in 1998 in the CED Motorsports car.

In 1998, Coons moved from Arizona to Indianapolis and teamed up with CED Motorsports to begin racing more regularly. Later that year, he appeared in his first USAC Silver Crown races, including the Sumar Classic at the Terre Haute Action Track and Eldora Speedway's Four Crown Nationals.

Coons' first USAC Sprint Car win came in the CED Motorsports #7c in 1999 in the Friday preliminary night for the Terre Haute National Open at the Terre Haute Action Track. He ran part-time in the series until 2005 when he joined Hoffman Dynamics in the No. 69 car and finished seventh in the standings with a win at Manzanita Speedway.

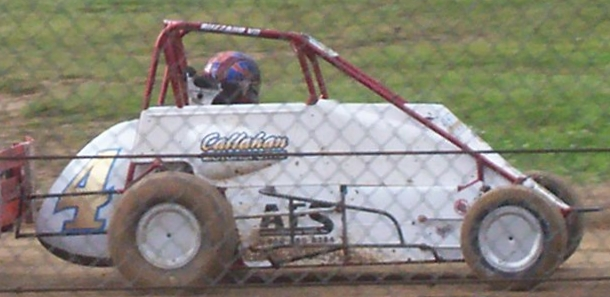
2018 USAC Midget

In 2008, Coons won both the USAC Silver Crown and Sprint Car championships.

In 2010, Coons was named National Midget Driver of the Decade, starting 282 features and claiming 56 wins over the course of the decade including. Also during that decade, he won the USAC Midget championship in 2006 and 2007, and was named National Midget Driver of the Year (NMDOTY) in 2007. He reclaimed the NMDOTY title in 2012 with four feature wins including the $12,000-to-win Belleville Midget Nationals.

Coons has wins in all three USAC series classes at Eldora Speedway's Four Crown Nationals, winning in Silver Crown in 2007 and 2014, Sprint Cars in 2009, and Midgets in 2010. He is a two-time Hoosier Hundred winner at the Indiana State Fairgrounds Speedway in 2011 and 2012, as well as a two-time Hulman Classic winner at the Terre Haute Action Track in 2010 and 2013.

==== Chili Bowl ====
Between 1994 and 2018, Coons has seventeen main event starts in the Chili Bowl Nationals, with a best finish of fourth in 2009, 2010, and 2016.

=== Indy Lights ===
In 2005, Coons competed in one IRL Infiniti Pro Series race at Nashville Superspeedway, driving for Hemelgarn Racing, where he started tenth and finished ninth.

== Awards and accomplishments ==
- USAC Triple Crown Champion
- National Midget Driver of the Decade, 2010
- National Sprint Car Poll Driver of the Year, 2008
- Belleville Midget Nationals winner, 2005, 2007, 2012

== Images ==
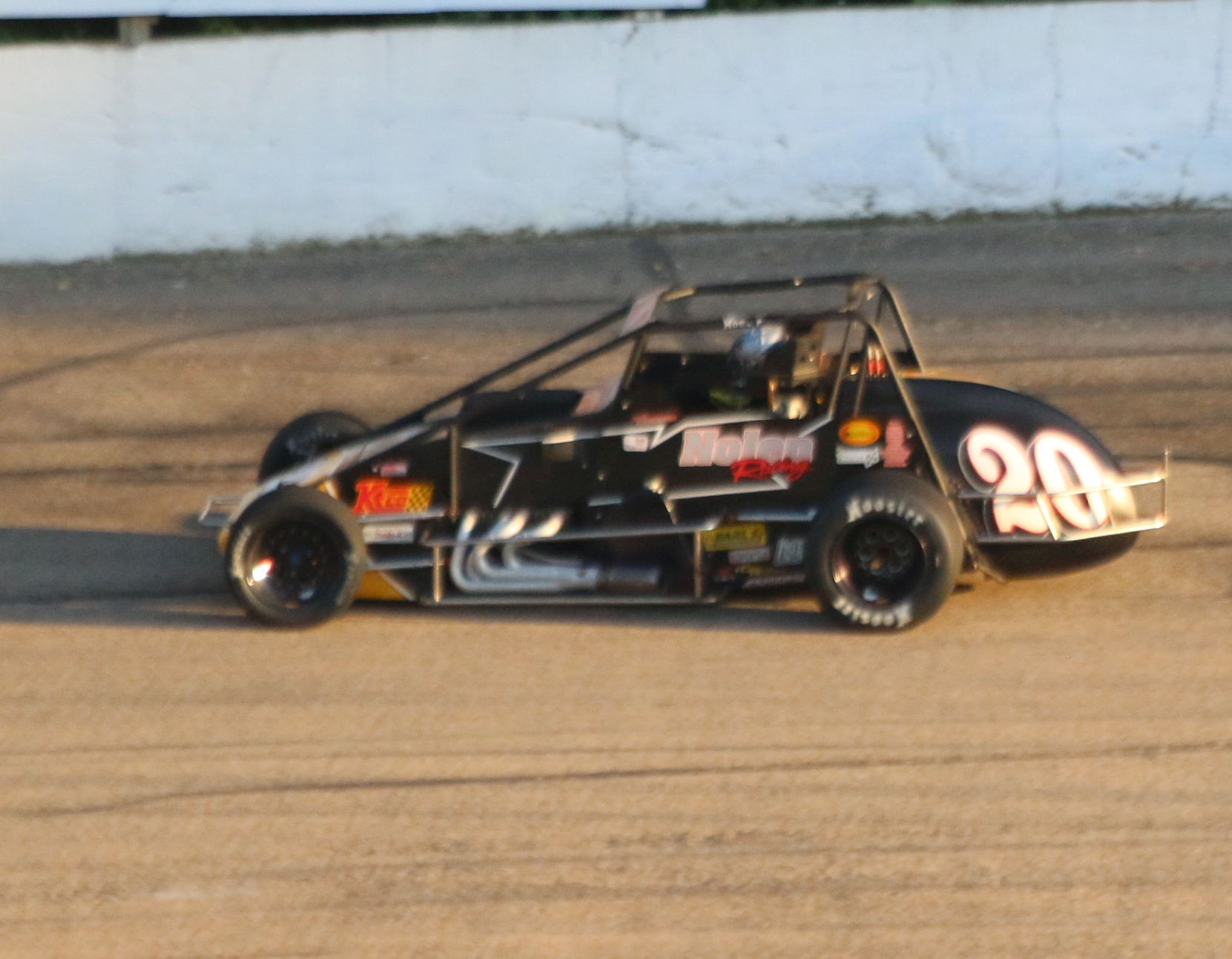
2018 USAC Silver Crown car

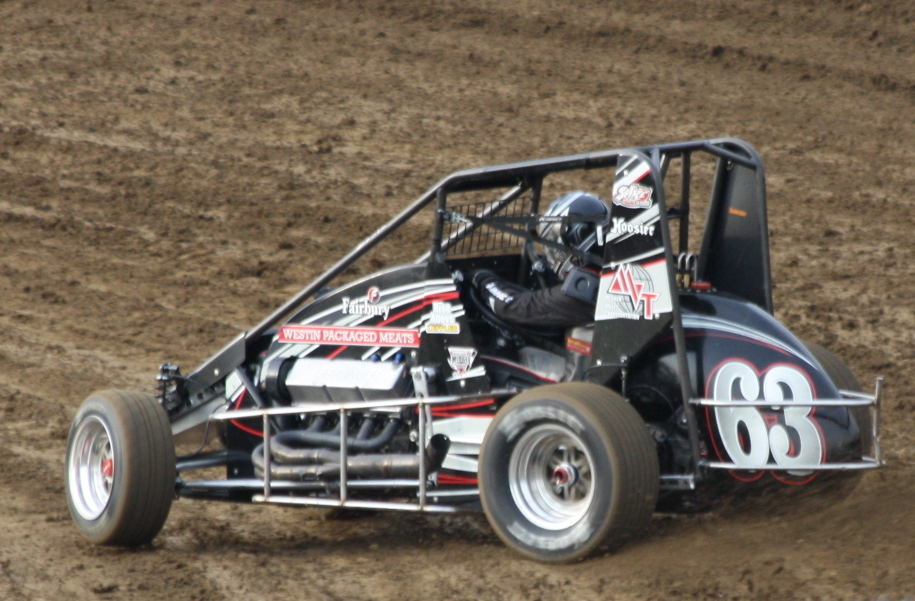
2013 USAC Midget

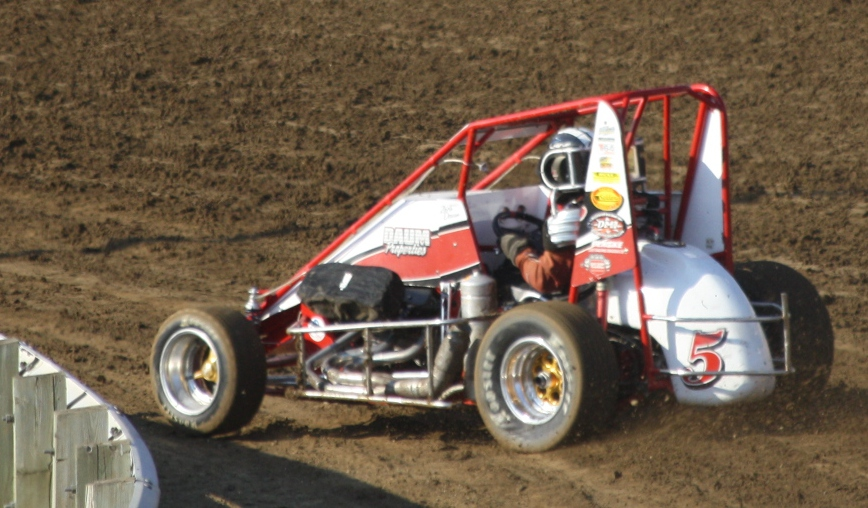
2012 USAC Midget

== Motorsports career results ==
(key)

=== Chili Bowl Results ===
			Prelim Night				Championship Night	
Year	Team	Car #	Heat Start	Heat Finish	Feature Start	Feature Finish	Feature Start	Feature Finish
1994						6		20
1995								
1996								
1997								
1998								
1999								7
2000	-	-	-	-	-	-	-	-
2001		4						23
2002		66		1		5		23
2003	Anderson/Fernandez	11c		1		19		B-main (14)
2004	Warnke	23		1		1		13
2005	Warnke	23		1		6		12
2006	Warnke	23		2		3		9
2007	Wilke-PAK	11		1		8		21
2008	Wilke-PAK	11		2		3		18
2009	Wilke-PAK	11		2		1		4
2010	Wilke-PAK	5		3		2		4
2011	2B Racing	0		1		2		11
2012	Lendich	3NZ		2		9		8
2013	Kunz/Dooling	63	5	1	2	4	14	6
2014	Wilke-PAK	5	5	3	18	8	21	18
2015	Wilke-PAK	5	3	1	3	1	1	13
2016	Wilke-PAK	5	8	2	10	2	6	4
2017	Wilke-PAK	5	7	5	22	8	15	8
2018	Wilke-PAK	5	7	3	12	10	B-main (13)	B-main (10)

=== Little 500 Results ===
Year	Team	Car #	Start	Finish	Laps	Status
2014	Nolen	3	3	2	500	Running
2015	Nolen	3	6	26	82	Wreck
2016	Nolen	3	10	3	500	Running
2017	Nolen	3	7	20	262	Wreck
2018	Nolen	3	8	28	108	Wreck

=== Indy Pro Series ===
Year	Team	1	2	3	4	5	6	7	8	9	10	11	12	13	14	Rank	Points
2005	Hemelgarn Racing	HMS	PHX	STP	INDY	TXS	IMS	NSH; 9	MIL	KTY	PPIR	SNM	CHI	WGL	FON	24th	22
