= Hoosier Hundred =

USAC Silver Crown Series race

USAC Silver Crown Series
- Location: Lucas Oil Indianapolis Raceway Park, Brownsburg, Indiana; 39.4203°N 87.4209°W
- First race: 1946
- First Silver Crown race: 1971
- Distance: 100.156 miles
- Laps: 146
- Previous names: Indianapolis 100; Hulman-Hoosier Hundred

Circuit information
- Surface: Dirt (1946–2020); Asphalt (2023–)
- Length: 1.104 km (0.686 mi)

The Hoosier Hundred is a USAC Silver Crown Series race scheduled for Lucas Oil Indianapolis Raceway Park as of 2023. It is a revival of the original race held from 1953–2020 at the Indiana State Fairgrounds Speedway, a one-mile dirt oval in Indianapolis. The race was first held in 1953, and through 1970 was part of the National Championship.

Over the years, the Hoosier Hundred was considered one of the richest and most prestigious open-wheel races in the United States. Seven winners of the Hoosier Hundred have also won the Indianapolis 500, led by A. J. Foyt, who has won six times. Therefore, the Indiana State Fairgrounds Speedway was known as the "Track of Champions."

Qualifying and/or heat race(s) lead to the main event, originally 100 laps, 100 miles, but with the revival, will be 146 laps, 100.181 miles.

== History ==
Racing at the fairgrounds oval dates back to the early 20th century. In June 1903, Barney Oldfield drove the first 60 mph (96.5 km/h) lap in automobile history at the circuit. The first AAA championship race took place in 1946, with Rex Mays sweeping the pole position and race.

=== 1953–1970 – Champ Cars ===
The first Hoosier Hundred was held in 1953, and was part of the AAA National Championship Trail. The traditional date for the race would be in September. The race provided a popular second race in the Indianapolis-area, with the famous Indianapolis 500 in May, and many of the same participants returning to the fairgrounds four months later. The race grew in popularity and stature, and became one of the richest and most prestigious dirt track races in the U.S.

Starting in 1956, the sanctioning changed to USAC. It remained part of the "Champ Car" national championship trail through 1970. From 1965 to 1970, the Hoosier Grand Prix was held at Indianapolis Raceway Park, which meant there would be three Champ Car races in the Indianapolis area annually.

=== 1971–1996 – Silver Crown cars ===
In 1971, USAC reorganized the National Championship trail, dropping all dirt tracks from the schedule. The Hoosier Hundred became part of the newly created National Dirt Car Championship (present-day Silver Crown Series), and the event continued to maintain its popularity and stature. For most of the 1970s, several top drivers from the USAC Champ Car ranks would continue to participate.

Starting in 1981, a second sister race, the Hulman Hundred was added to the fairgrounds speedway. The Hulman Hundred, named in honor of Tony Hulman, was scheduled for May, typically the weekend of the Indy 500. Among the winners of the May race was future NASCAR champion Jeff Gordon.

In 1991, the Foyt Group took over promotions for both the Hulman Hundred (May) and Hoosier Hundred (September). For 1992–1995, they continued to schedule both races annually. For a brief time in the early 1990s, the Hoosier Hundred was moved up to Labor Day weekend, and coincided with the weekend of the U.S. Nationals, held at nearby Indianapolis Raceway Park.

The 1996 Hulman Hundred was held in May as scheduled, but during the summer of 1996, the traditional fall Hoosier Hundred was cancelled by the Foyt Group. They cited sagging attendance and revenue. In order to maintain a continuous lineage, the May 25 "Hulman Hundred" was retroactively titled the "1996 Hoosier Hundred".

=== 1997–2001: Hulman-Hoosier Hundred ===
Starting in 1997, the Foyt Group merged the two races, and introduced a newly revamped event, titled the TrueValue Hulman-Hoosier Hundred. They elected to utilize the May date, expecting a better crowd the weekend of the Indy 500.

The 1998 race was notable in that three drivers in the Hulman-Hoosier Hundred, Donnie Beechler, Jimmy Kite, and Jack Hewitt, were also participating in the Indianapolis 500. It was the first time in several years that multiple drivers competed at the fairgrounds and at Indy in the same year. Beechler would go on to win the race (called at 39 miles due to rain), while Kite and Hewitt would finish 11th and 12th, respectively, at Indy.

In 2000, the race was rained out on Friday, May 26 and Saturday, May 27. The Foyt Group rescheduled the race for September 22, the Friday before the Formula One U.S. Grand Prix at Indy. The race temporarily returned to its traditional September date and took on the one-time moniker the "Salute to the Grand Prix."

In 2001, the race was rained out again. For the second year in a row, it was rescheduled for the Friday before the U.S. Grand Prix. After 2001, the Foyt Group quit promotion of the race, and it was temporarily put on hiatus.

=== 2002-19: Revival ===
6R promotions took over the event, and revived the race for 2002. It was reverted to the original "Hoosier Hundred" name, dropping the "Hulman" reference. The race kept the Indy 500 weekend date in late May.

Track Enterprises and Bob Sargent took over the race in 2006 and currently promotes the race. For the 60th running in 2013, it was planned to move the race from Friday night of Indy 500 weekend to Thursday night. Carb Day, the final day of practice for the Indy 500, had been moved to Friday, and organizers wanted to move the Hoosier Hundred to avoid the conflict. However, in 2013, Thursday night was rained out, and the race was postponed to Friday night after all.

=== 2020 ===
Track Enterprises continues as the promoter of the event. In 2019, with the rise of horse racing and the push for more legalized sports betting, the Fairgrounds announced that the race track would down after the 2019 season and would be converted into a harness practice facility.

Track Enterprises announced on November 25, 2019 that the Hoosier Hundred would move to the Terre Haute Action Track, a half-mile dirt track also promoted by the company, beginning in 2020. However, due to the COVID-19 pandemic, the 2020 Hoosier Hundred/Sumar Classic, scheduled for May 21, was initially scratched. Later in the year, the race was revived and rescheduled for the night of August 23 (the same day as the Indy 500), but back at the Fairgrounds track, as the planned improvements to convert the Fairgrounds oval to a horse racing facility were delayed. For the 2021 season, the Hoosier Hundred was replaced by the Sumar Classic at Terre Haute.

=== 2023 ===
The Hoosier Hundred was announced to return on April 23, 2023, on the Lucas Oil Indianapolis Raceway Park .686-mile paved oval. The event was planned to be a non-championship event, with drivers and teams earning appearance points only. Due to inclement weather (track conditions unsafe with cold temperatures), the event was moved to the IRP's Carb Night Classic on Memorial Day weekend, becoming a points race for the USAC Silver Crown Series. The race is set for 146 laps, 100.146 miles, but is not the longest Silver Crown race at IRP, as from 1985 to 1988, IRP held a Silver Crown race for 150 laps, or 102.9 miles.

== Race results ==
=== Hoosier Hundred ===
Season	Date	Driver	Sanction	To Win	Purse
Indianapolis 100
1946	September 15	Rex Mays	AAA Championship	$3,905	$15,759
Hoosier Hundred
1953	September 26	Bob Sweikert	AAA Championship	$6,951	$24,674
1954	September 18	Jimmy Bryan	AAA Championship	$7,180	$26,740
1955	September 17	Jimmy Bryan	AAA Championship	$6,975	$27,360
1956	September 15	Jimmy Bryan	USAC Championship	$7,750	$30,100
1957	September 14	Jud Larson	USAC Championship	$8,380	$31,360
1958	September 13	Eddie Sachs	USAC Championship	$8,990	$32,760
1959	September 19	Rodger Ward	USAC Championship	$11,675	$36,535
1960	September 17	A. J. Foyt	USAC Championship	$10,225	$39,905
1961	September 16	A. J. Foyt	USAC Championship	$12,815	$41,925
1962	September 15	Parnelli Jones	USAC Championship		
1963	September 14	Rodger Ward	USAC Championship		
1964	September 26*	A. J. Foyt	USAC Championship		
1965	September 18	A. J. Foyt	USAC Championship		
1966	September 10	Mario Andretti	USAC Championship		
1967	September 9	Mario Andretti	USAC Championship		
1968	September 7	A. J. Foyt	USAC Championship		
1969	September 6	A. J. Foyt	USAC Championship		
1970	September 12	Al Unser, Sr.	USAC Championship		
1971	September 12	Al Unser, Sr.	USAC Silver Crown		
1972	September 9	Al Unser, Sr.	USAC Silver Crown		
1973	September 15	Al Unser, Sr.	USAC Silver Crown		
1974	September 7	Jackie Howerton	USAC Silver Crown		
1975	September 6	Tom Bigelow	USAC Silver Crown		
1976	September 11	Joe Saldana	USAC Silver Crown		
1977	September 10	Pancho Carter	USAC Silver Crown		
1978	September 9	Billy Engelhart	USAC Silver Crown		
1979	September 8	Bobby Olivero	USAC Silver Crown		
1980	September 6	Gary Bettenhausen	USAC Silver Crown		
1981	September 12	Larry Rice	USAC Championship		
1982	September 11	Chuck Gurney	USAC Silver Crown		
1983	September 10	Chuck Gurney	USAC Silver Crown		
1984	September 15	Steve Chassey	USAC Silver Crown		
1985	September 14	Sheldon Kinser	USAC Silver Crown		
1986	September 13	Jack Hewitt	USAC Silver Crown		
1987	September 12	Kenny Jacobs	USAC Silver Crown		
1988	September 10	Jack Hewitt	USAC Silver Crown		
1989	August 27	Jack Hewitt	USAC Silver Crown		
1990	August 11	Gary Hieber	USAC Silver Crown		
1991	August 10	Jeff Swindell	USAC Silver Crown		
1992	September 12	Ron Shuman	USAC Silver Crown		
1993	September 11	Jeff Swindell	USAC Silver Crown		
1994	September 3	Jimmy Sills	USAC Silver Crown		
1995	September 2	Dave Darland	USAC Silver Crown		
1996*	August 24	Race cancelled			
Hulman-Hoosier Hundred
1997	May 23	Chuck Leary	USAC Silver Crown	$9,000	$40,000
1998	May 22	Donnie Beechler	USAC Silver Crown		
1999	May 28	Jimmy Stills	USAC Silver Crown	$9,150	$43,400
2000	September 22*	Tony Elliott	USAC Silver Crown		
2001	September 28*	Tony Elliott	USAC Silver Crown		
Hoosier Hundred
2002	May 24	Jason Leffler	USAC Silver Crown		
2003	May 23	J. J. Yeley	USAC Silver Crown		$43,200
2004	May 28	Dave Darland	USAC Silver Crown		
2005	May 27	Teddy Beach	USAC Silver Crown		
2006	May 26	Josh Wise	USAC Silver Crown		
2007	May 25	Race cancelled due to rain			
2008	May 23	Race cancelled again due to rain			
2009	May 22	Shane Hollingsworth	USAC Silver Crown		
2010	May 28	Shane Hmiel	USAC Silver Crown		
2011	May 27	Jerry Coons Jr.	USAC Silver Crown	$10,000	
2012	May 25	Jerry Coons Jr.	USAC Silver Crown		
2013	May 24*	Levi Jones	USAC Silver Crown		
2014	May 23	Kody Swanson	USAC Silver Crown		
2015	May 21	Kody Swanson	USAC Silver Crown		
2016	May 26	Kody Swanson	USAC Silver Crown		
2017	May 25	Race cancelled due to rain			
2018	May 24	Kody Swanson	USAC Silver Crown		
2019	May 23	Tyler Courtney	USAC Silver Crown		
2020	August 23	Kyle Larson	USAC Silver Crown	$10,000	
2021–2022: Race not held
2023	May 26	Bobby Santos III	USAC Silver Crown	$25,000	
2024	May 25^{1}	Kody Swanson	USAC Silver Crown	$25,000	$92,000

- ^{1} Scheduled for May 24, but postponed due to rain.

=== Hulman Hundred ===
Season	Date	Driver	Sanction
1981	May 2	Steve Kinser	USAC Silver Crown
1982	May 8	Rick Hood	USAC Silver Crown
1983	May 27	Chuck Gurney	USAC Silver Crown
1984	May 25	George Snider	USAC Silver Crown
1985	May 24	Sheldon Kinser	USAC Silver Crown
1986	May 23	Jack Hewitt	USAC Silver Crown
1987	May 22	Jeff Swindell	USAC Silver Crown
1988	May 27	Chuck Gurney	USAC Silver Crown
1989	May 26	Rich Vogler	USAC Silver Crown
1990	May 25	Jack Hewitt	USAC Silver Crown
1991	May 24	Jeff Gordon	USAC Silver Crown
1992	May 22	Lealand McSpadden	USAC Silver Crown
1993	May 28	Steve Butler	USAC Silver Crown
1994	May 27	Jimmy Stills	USAC Silver Crown
1995	May 26	Dave Darland	USAC Silver Crown
1996*	May 25	Dave Darland	USAC Silver Crown
1997	See "Hulman-Hoosier Hundred"		
1998	See "Hulman-Hoosier Hundred"		
1999	See "Hulman-Hoosier Hundred"		
2000	See "Hulman-Hoosier Hundred"		
2001	See "Hulman-Hoosier Hundred"		

==== Footnotes ====
- 1964: Scheduled for September 19; postponed to September 26 due to rain
- 1996: The annual Hulman Hundred was scheduled for Friday May 24, but was postponed until Saturday May 25 due to rain. The traditional fall race was scheduled for late August, but was ultimately cancelled by promoters. The May 25, 1996 running of the "Hulman Hundred" (won by Dave Darland) was retroactively designated the 1996 edition of the annual "Hoosier Hundred," and is henceforth considered part of its annual lineage.
- 2000: Scheduled for Friday May 26, postponed to September 22 due to rain and became part of U.S. Grand Prix weekend.
- 2001: Scheduled for Friday May 25, postponed to September 28 due to rain and became part of U.S. Grand Prix weekend.
- 2013: Scheduled for Thursday May 23; postponed to Friday May 24 due to rain
- 2020: Scheduled for May 21 at Terre Haute Action Track but cancelled due to COVID-19 pandemic. Race was rescheduled for August 23 at the Fairgrounds.
- 2023: Scheduled for April 22 as a non-championship round but cancelled because of weather issues. Originally scheduled 100-lap race for Carb Night Classic repurposed into Hoosier Hundred format with 145 laps.

== Notes ==
=== See also ===
- Hut Hundred
- Little 500
- Turkey Night Grand Prix
- Carb Night Classic

=== Works cited ===
- ChampCarStas.com - Indiana State Fairgrounds
- RacingReference.info - Indiana State Fairgrounds
- Ultimate Racing History - Indiana State Fairgrounds
- List of race winners
