= Kody Swanson =

American racing driver (born 1988)

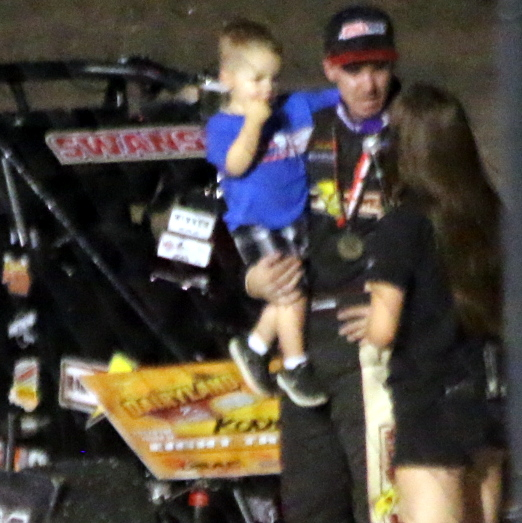
- Swanson in 2018 after winning USAC Silver Crown race at Madison
- Born: March 3, 1988 (age 38) Kingsburg, California, U.S.

USAC Silver Crown Series career
- Debut season: 2008
- Wins: 45
- Best finish: 1st in 2014, 2015, 2017, 2018, 2019, 2021, 2022, 2024
- Finished last season: 6th

Championship titles
- 2014, 2015, 2017, 2018, 2019, 2021, 2022, 2024: USAC Silver Crown

Awards
- 2009: USAC Silver Crown Rookie of the Year

Kody Mykel Swanson (born March 3, 1988) is an American professional sprint car racing driver. Swanson holds the record for most championship victories in USAC national series, with eight championships in the USAC Silver Crown Series, coming in 2014, 2015, 2017, 2018, 2019, 2021, 2022 and 2024. He has also taken three victories in the Little 500 pavement sprint car race. Swanson is currently the all-time wins leader in Silver Crown with 45.

== Racing career ==
=== Silver Crown Series ===
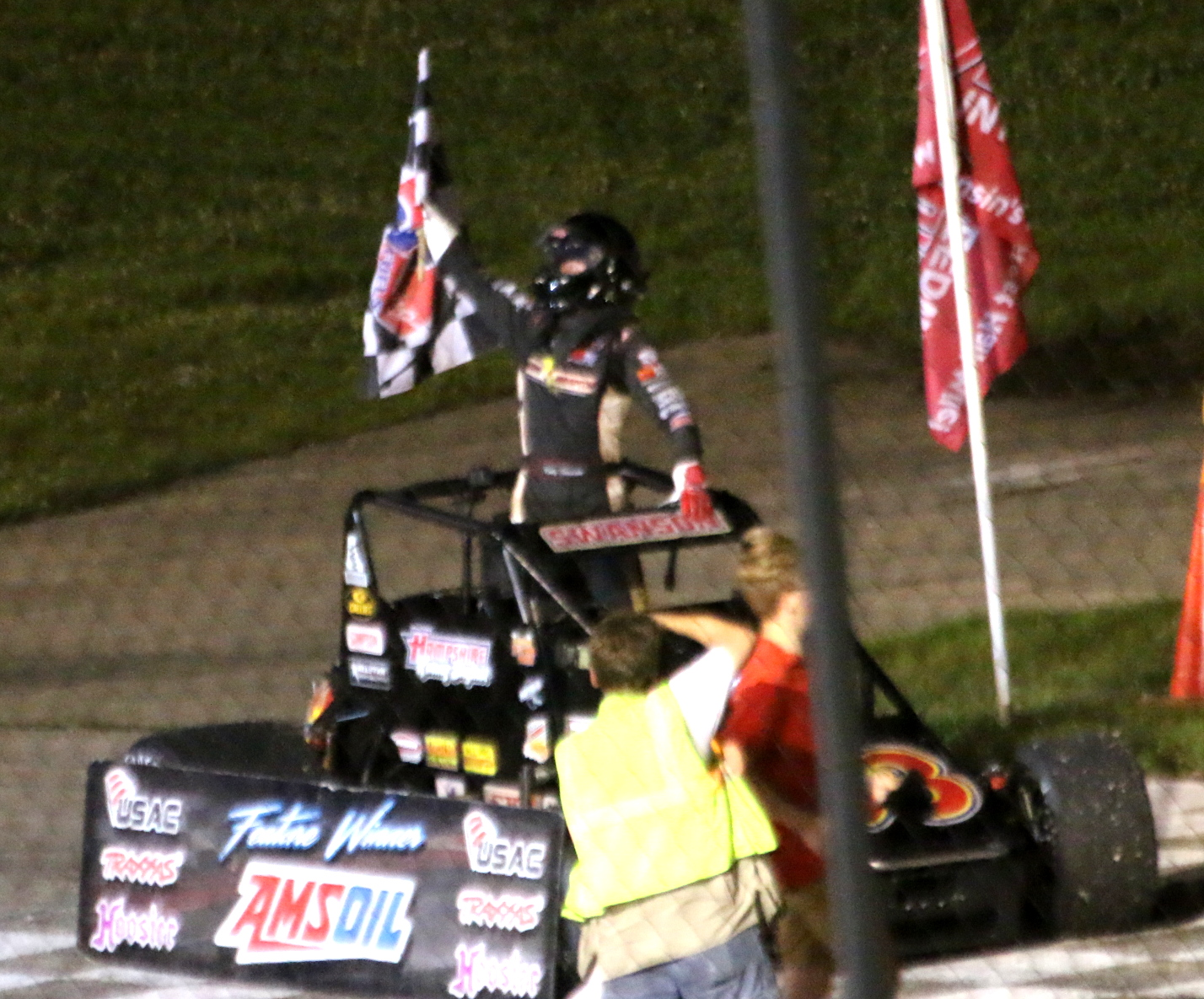
Swanson after winning his record-tying 23rd USAC Silver Crown race in 2018 at Madison.

Swanson made his Silver Crown Series debut in August 2008. His first series podium came in July 2009 with a third-place finish at Iowa Speedway, driving the No. 19 for Team Six-R. In his sophomore season, he finished fifth in the series standings and was named Rookie of the Year.

Swanson's first win came in the Ted Horn 100 at the DuQuoin State Fairgrounds Racetrack in September 2010. It was his only win that season. However, he claimed four podiums and six top-five finishes throughout nine races.

In 2018, Swanson joined Al Unser Sr. as one of the only two drivers in history to win four consecutive Hoosier Hundred USAC Silver Crown Series races at the Indiana State Fairgrounds Speedway in Indianapolis, Indiana. As of the end of the 2024 season, he is the all-time winningest USAC Silver Crown driver with 45 wins (second most is Jack Hewitt with 23 wins). With eight Silver Crown championship victories, Swanson also has the most championships for both the Silver Crown series and for any USAC national series.

=== Little 500 ===
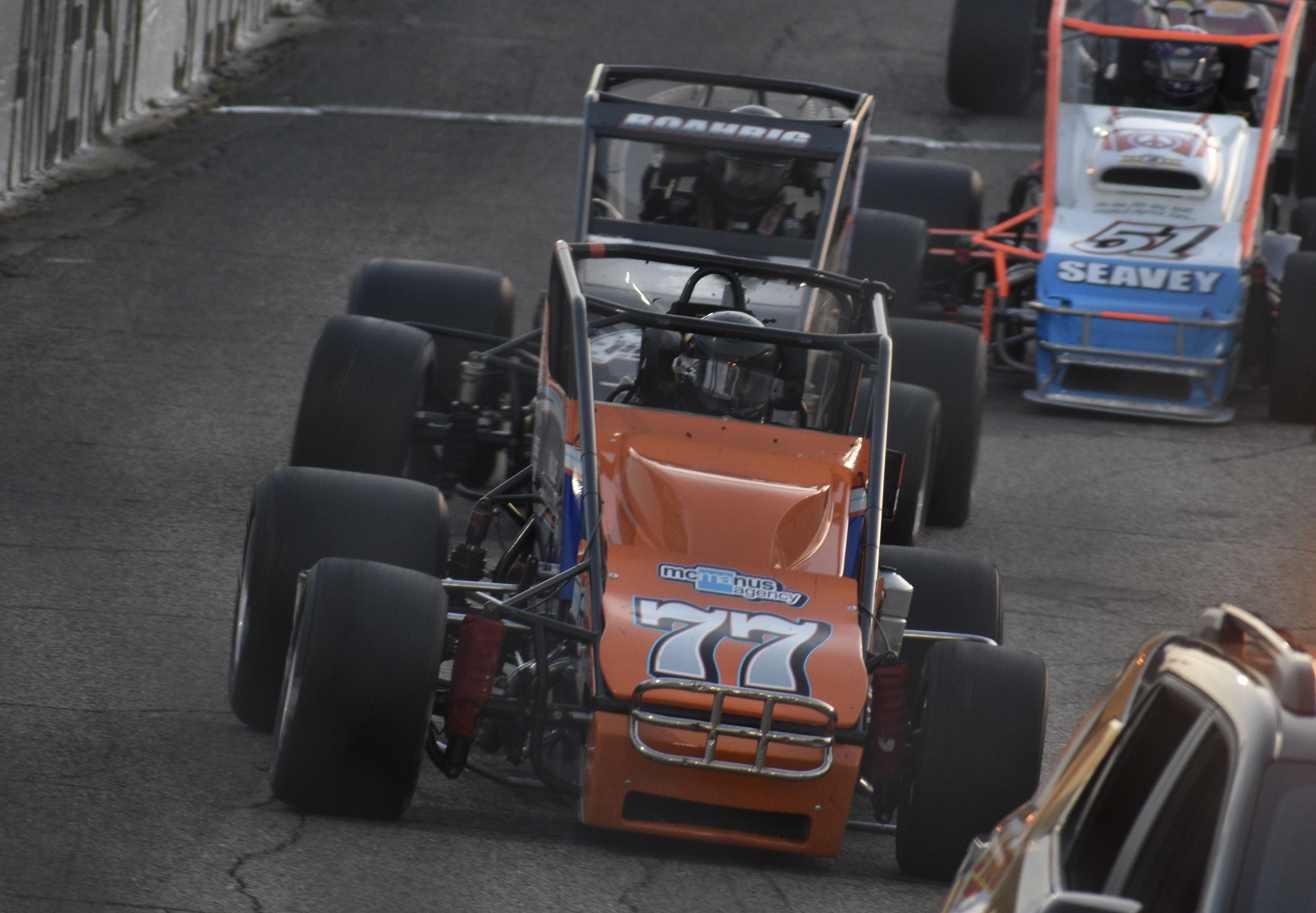
Kody Swanson (77) en route to victory at the 2026 Little 500

Swanson has competed in the Little 500 at Anderson Speedway several times, recording four wins, one each in 2016, 2018, 2019, and 2026.

In 2022, Swanson won the inaugural season of the Indiana-based 500 Sprint Car Tour. He has since gone on to win the 2024, 2026 Tour Championships becoming the only multi-time champion.

=== Stock car racing ===
Swanson watched Automobile Racing Club of America (ARCA) races during combined events with Silver Crown. Silver Crown director Andy Hillenburg, a longtime ARCA team owner and former ARCA champion, arranged a meeting between Swanson and several owners to try to get him an ARCA ride, and this led to a one-race deal in the No. 22 Chad Bryant Racing at Iowa Speedway in July 2020.

=== Other racing ===
Swanson has won in USAC National midget cars. In 2020, he tested an Indy Pro 2000 car at La Crosse Fairgrounds Speedway with hopes that he might someday be considered for an Indianapolis 500 ride. Later that year, he would enter the Indy Pro 2000 race at the Carb Night Classic with Legacy Autosport and win in his series debut. 2021 brought Swanson the A. J. Foyt trophy while becoming only the second driver (Mike Bliss 93/94) to win in Midgets, Sprint Cars and Silver Crown competition at Indianapolis Raceway Park all in the same year. Swanson has also ran a supermodified at the Oswego Speedway for AJ and Jon Lesiecki out of Lorain, Ohio.

== Motorsports career results ==
=== ARCA Menards Series ===
(key) (Bold – Pole position awarded by qualifying time. Italics – Pole position earned by points standings or practice time. * – Most laps led.)

ARCA Menards Series results
Year	Team	No.	Make	1	2	3	4	5	6	7	8	9	10	11	12	13	14	15	16	17	18	19	20	AMSC	Pts	Ref
2020	Chad Bryant Racing	22	Ford	DAY	PHO	TAL	POC	IRP	KEN	IOW; 8	KAN	TOL	TOL	MCH	DAY	GTW	L44	TOL	BRI	WIN	MEM	ISF	KAN	57th	36	
2021	GMS Racing	21	Chevy	DAY	PHO	TAL	KAN	TOL	CLT	MOH	POC	ELK	BLN	IOW	WIN	GLN	MCH	ISF	MLW	DSF	BRI	SLM; 9	KAN	84th	35	

=== Little 500 ===
(key)

Year	Start	Finish	Status
2015	2	7	Running
2016	14	1	Running
2017	3	4	Running
2018	4	1	Running
2019	1	1	Running
2020	1	14	Out
2021	1	2	Running
2022	3	7	Running
2023	1	3	Running
2025	7	7	Running
2026	3	1	Running

=== American open–wheel racing results ===
==== Indy Pro 2000 Championship ====
Year	Team	1	2	3	4	5	6	7	8	9	10	11	12	13	14	15	Rank	Points
2020	Legacy Autosport	ROA	ROA	MOH	MOH	MOH	LOR; 1	GMP; 12	IMS	IMS	IMS	NJM	NJM	NJM	STP	STP	18th*	60*

=== Superstar Racing Experience ===
(key) * – Most laps led. ^{1} – Heat 1 winner. ^{2} – Heat 2 winner.

Superstar Racing Experience results
Year	No.	1	2	3	4	5	6	SRXC	Pts
2021	63	STA	KNX	ELD; 2	IRP	SLG	NSV	16th	30

^{*} Season still in progress
