= Terre Haute Action Track =

Racetrack

Coordinates: 39.420315°N 87.420884°W

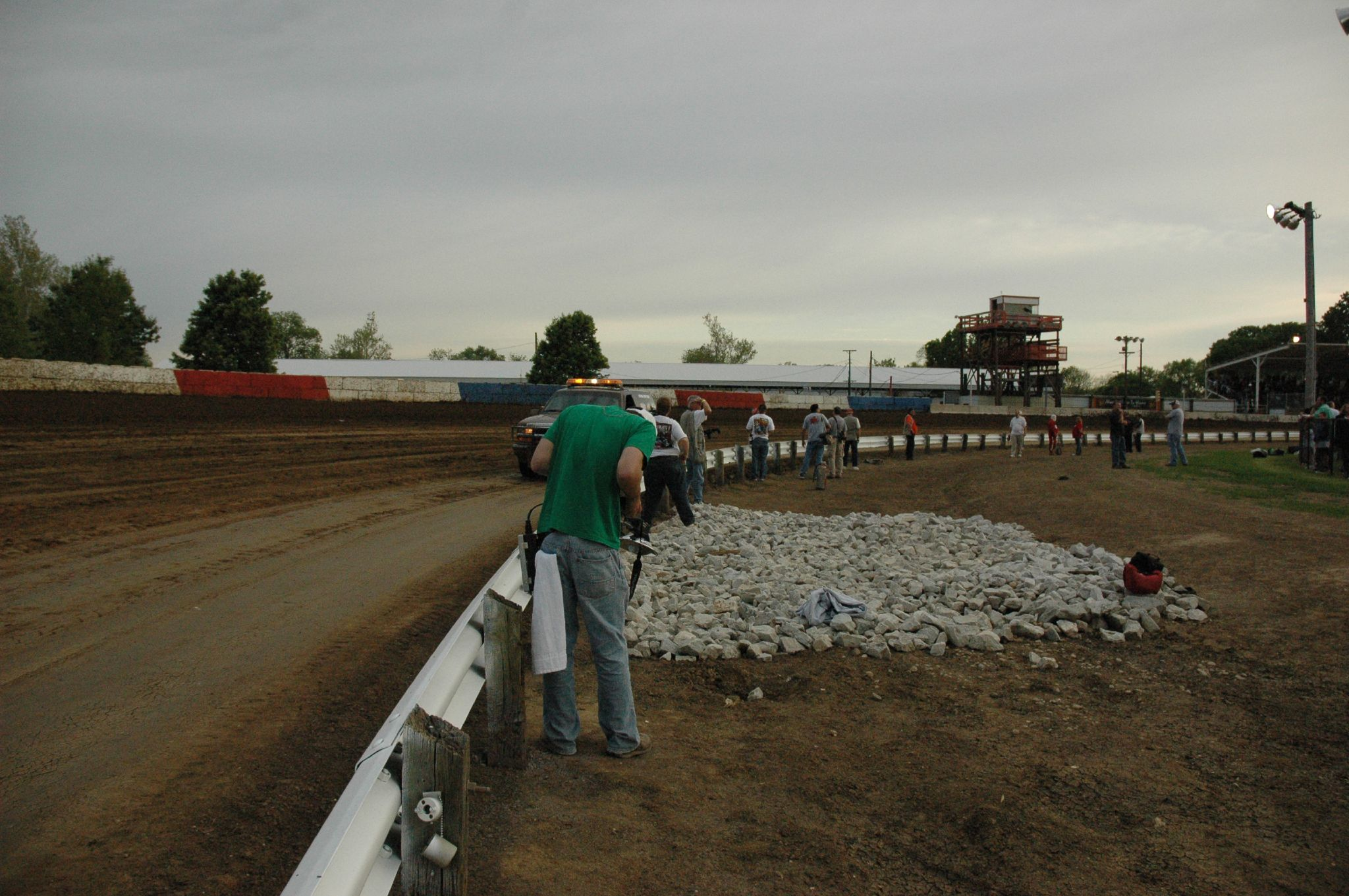
- Turns 1 and 2 at the Action Track at the 2008 Hulman Classic
- Location: Honey Creek Township, Vigo County, near Terre Haute, Indiana, United States
- Coordinates: 39.4203, -87.4209
- Owner: Vigo County Fair Assoc
- Operator: Track Enterprises/Bob Sargent
- Broke ground: 1949
- Opened: 1952
- Closed: 1988-1989, 2007
- Former names: The Action Track
- Major events: USAC National Midget Series: Hut Hundred (until 2009); USAC National Sprint Car Championship: Tony Hulman Classic, Don Smith Classic; USAC Silver Crown Series: Sumar Classic
- Surface: Dirt
- Length: 0.50 mi (0.8 km)
- Turns: 4

Terre Haute Action Track (also The Action Track) is a half-mile dirt racetrack located at the Vigo County, Indiana, fairgrounds on U.S. Route 41 along the south side of Terre Haute, Indiana. The track hosts annual United States Automobile Club (USAC) midget car, sprint car and Silver Crown events. Notable drivers that have competed at the track include A. J. Foyt, Jeff Gordon, Parnelli Jones, and Tony Stewart. The track has held events sanctioned by USAC, its predecessor American Automobile Association (AAA), and the World of Outlaws.

== History ==
The track opened on June 15, 1952. It closed for a short period beginning in 1987 and reopened in 1990. It closed again in May 2007 for the rest of the season after it lost its race card because it broke a local curfew. The promoter had to stop the event early. As of the start of the 2008 season, Rich Vogler's 13 feature wins is the most in track history.

=== Promoters ===
The track was promoted by Don Smith in the 1960s. By 2008, the track had been run by a series of promoters and attendance dwindled. Most sanctioning bodies holding events at the track dropped it from their schedule and only a few events were held in recent years. The track lost its United States Automobile Club (USAC) events in mid-2007. In 2008, the DHK Promotions LLC group took over running the track. DHK Promotions was named for its founders: then-retired Major League Baseball player Brian Dorsett, then-active (later retired) Indy Racing League driver Davey Hamilton and then-active (later retired) Indianapolis 500 radio announcer Mike King.

In 2009 DHK Promotions added a new partner, changed its name to Action Promotions LLC and announced a schedule of six special events that took place at the historic half-mile clay oval starting Saturday, May 2.

Chris Novotney, a Wabash Valley native who grew up attending sprint car races at the famed track, spent 2008 overseeing the reconstruction of the track surface and the installation of a new track drainage system. Novotney joins Brian Dorsett, Davey Hamilton and Mike King in the group that is now known as Action Promotions, LLC.

Since 2012, the track is operated by Terre Haute Motorsports, a partnership between Bob Sargent and Reece O'Connor.

As of 2018, the track was still under the operation of Track Enterprises and company owner Bob Sargent. Adam Mackey, who is a co-promoter at the facility, announced a more extensive schedule for the 2018 season which features 10 events, significantly more than in recent years.

In 2023. Bill Rose of BR Promotions became the next Promoter to help keep the facility alive; otherwise no promoter would have been in charge for the 2023 race season.

== Media ==
Track events are no longer broadcast as Crossroads Communications is no longer affiliated with the Track. In 2009 WTHI Hi-99 became the official track station, though the races were not broadcast.

== Hut Hundred ==
The track held the major midget car racing event since 1954. Event winners include AJ Foyt, Tony Bettenhausen, Don Branson, Tony Stewart, and 1990 winner Jeff Gordon. Rich Vogler won the event eight times, including six in the seven years between 1983 and 1989. Al Herman won the first event in 1954. In 2009 the event was not held and in 2010, it moved to the Tri-State Speedway in Haubstadt, Indiana. The Indiana State Fairgrounds in Indianapolis, Indiana hosted the race in 1987. The 1989 race was held at the Lawrenceburg Speedway. In 1988, 2000 and 2001, the Lincoln Park Speedway in Putnamville, Indiana hosted the race.

Winners

- 1954 Al Herman
- 1955 Tony Bettenhausen
- 1956 Tony Bettenhausen
- 1957 Gene Hartley
- 1958 Don Branson
- 1959 Gene Hartley
- 1960 Bob McLean
- 1961 A. J. Foyt
- 1962 Ronnie Duman
- 1963 Bob Wente
- 1964 Bob Tattersall
- 1965 A. J. Foyt
- 1966 Don Branson
- 1967 Mel Kenyon
- 1968 Mike McGreevy
- 1969 Bob Tattersall
- 1970 Larry Rice
- 1971 Jerry McClung
- 1972 Pancho Carter
- 1973 Bill Englehart
- 1974 Bobby Olivero
- 1975 Pancho Carter
- 1976 Gary Bettenhausen
- 1977 Bubby Jones
- 1978 Rich Vogler
- 1979 Johnny Parsons
- 1980 Rich Vogler
- 1981 Warren Mockler
- 1982 Ron Shuman
- 1983 Rich Vogler
- 1984 Rich Vogler
- 1985 Rich Vogler
- 1986 Rich Vogler
- 1987 Johnny Heydenreich
- 1988 Rich Vogler
- 1989 Rich Vogler
- 1990 Jeff Gordon
- 1991 Stevie Reeves
- 1992 Steve Knepper
- 1993 Tony Stewart
- 1994 Kevin Doty
- 1995 Tony Stewart
- 1996 Kevin Olson
- 1997 Jason Leffler
- 1998 Donnie Beechler
- 1999 Dave Darland
- 2000 Jay Drake
- 2001 Tracy Hines
- 2002 Mike Hess
- 2003 Dave Darland
- 2004 Bobby East
- 2005 Johnny Rodriguez
- 2006 Darren Hagen
- 2007 No race
- 2008 Cole Whitt
- 2009 No race
- 2010 Bryan Clauson
- 2011 Zach Daum
- 2012 Brady Bacon

Results References:

== Hulman Classic ==
One of USAC non-wing sprint car racing's biggest races had its inaugural running at the Terre Haute Action Track in 1971. Named the Hulman Classic in honor of Indianapolis Motor Speedway owner Tony Hulman (who was still alive at the time), the race falls during the week of the Indianapolis 500. In its inaugural year, the race paid a total purse of $28,538 ($226,900 today) and was televised on ABC's Wide World of Sports, becoming the first televised sprint car race in history. In its early years, it was not uncommon for drivers to race both the Hulman Classic and the Indianapolis 500 in the same week. As of May 2017, the Hulman Classic was USAC's longest annually-contested event, and had been held at the Terre Haute Action Track every year except for a brief interruption from 1988 to 1991, when the event was held at Indianapolis Raceway Park.

Winners

Year	Driver	Car #	Team
1971	George Snider	29	Louis Seymour
1972	Bruce Walkup	29	
1973	Joe Saldana	25	
1974	Gary Bettenhausen	24	
1975	Pancho Carter	4	
1976	Jan Opperman	64	Bill Smith
1977	Jim McElreath	8	
1978	Dick Tobias	17	
1979	Pancho Carter	44	
1980	Eddie Leavitt	7	
1981	Sheldon Kinser	6	Ben Leyba
1982	Chet Johnson		
1983	Jack Hewitt	51	
1984	Rick Hood		
1985	Ron Shuman		
1986	Rich Vogler		
1987	Steve Butler	1	
1988	Steve Butler		
1989	Rich Vogler	69	Hoffman
1990	Jeff Bloom		
1991	Eric Gordon		
1992	Cary Faas		
1993	Dave Darland		
1994	Cary Faas		Steve Chrisman
1995	Jack Hewitt	63	Bob Hampshire
1996	Doug Kalitta		
1997	J. J. Yeley		
1998	Cary Faas		
1999	Terry Pletch		
2000	Jay Drake		
2001	Tracy Hines		
2002	Jon Stanbrough	57H	Paul Hazen
2003	J. J. Yeley		
2004	Cory Kruseman	21	Tony Stewart
2005	Levi Jones	2B	Scott Benic
2006	Daron Clayton	92	Clayton
2007	Jon Stanbrough	53	Fox
2008	Levi Jones	20	Tony Stewart
2009	Levi Jones	20	Tony Stewart
2010	Jerry Coons Jr.	69	Hoffman
2011	Chris Windom	5x	Baldwin
2012	Bud Kaeding	29k	BK
2013	Jerry Coons Jr.	10E	Monte Edison
2014	Dave Darland	71p	Steve Phillips
2015	Robert Ballou	12	Ballou
2016	Robert Ballou	1	Ballou
2017	Kevin Thomas Jr.	9K	KT Motorsports
2018	Tyler Courtney		
2019	Chase Stockon	32	
2020	Chris Windom	19	
2021	Chris Windom		
2022	Robert Ballou		
2023	Brady Bacon	69	Hoffman

== Sumar Classic ==
The USAC Silver Crown Series first visited Terre Haute in 1980. The series returned in 1995, with the race named Sumar Classic 100, after the local-based 1950s USAC racing team Sumar Racing. Trademark Sumar Classic Owned by BR Promotions.

Winners

- 1980 Gary Bettenhausen
- 1995 Donnie Beechler
- 1996 Kevin Thomas
- 1997 Donnie Beechler
- 1998 Tony Elliott
- 1999 Jack Hewitt
- 2002 Tony Elliott
- 2003 J. J. Yeley
- 2004 Brian Tyler
- 2005 Josh Wise
- 2006 Bud Kaeding
- 2008 Dave Darland
- 2010 Levi Jones
- 2011 Levi Jones
- 2012 Bobby East
- 2014 Kody Swanson
- 2015 Shane Cockrum
- 2016 C.J. Leary
- 2017 Chris Windom
- 2018 Justin Grant
- 2022 Justin Grant
