= Indiana State Fair =

Annual fair held in Indianapolis, Indiana, US

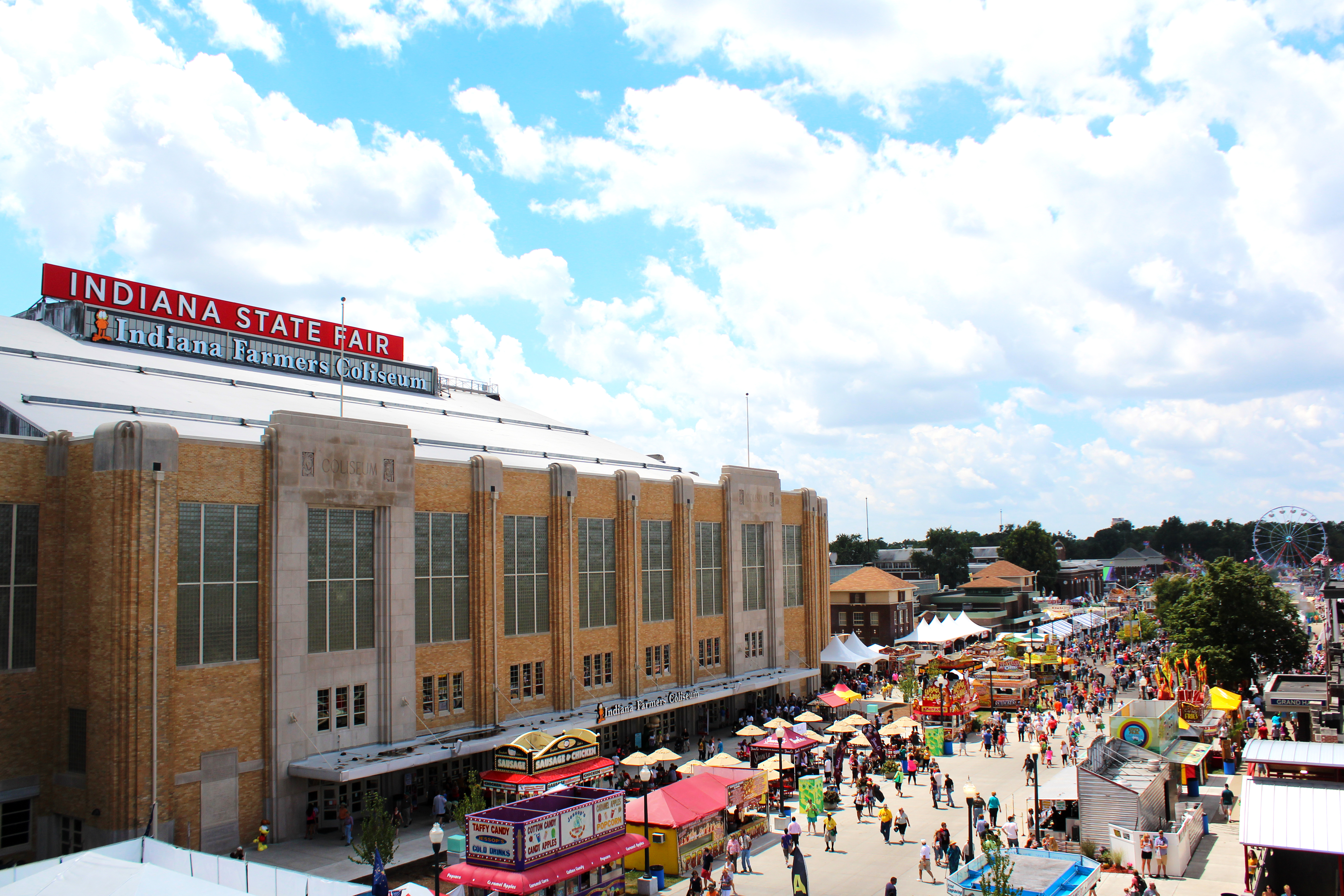
- Main Street during the 2015 Indiana State Fair
- Status: Active
- Genre: State fair
- Frequency: Annually
- Venue: Indiana State Fairgrounds & Event Center
- Locations: Indianapolis, Indiana
- Coordinates: 39°49′47.82″N 86°8′3.68″W
- Country: U.S.
- Years active: 1852–1860; 1865–1916; 1919–1941; 1945–2019; 2021–
- Inaugurated: October 20, 1852; 174 years ago
- Previous event: August 1–August 17, 2025
- Next event: August 7–August 23, 2026
- Attendance: ▲854,977 (2025)
- Leader: Cynthia Hoye (executive director)
- Organizer: Indiana State Fair Commission
- Website: indianastatefair.com

The Indiana State Fair is an annual state fair that spans 15 days in August in Indianapolis, Indiana, U.S. The Indiana State Fair debuted in 1852 at Military Park in Indianapolis and is the sixth oldest state fair in the U.S. It is the largest event in the state, drawing between 730,000 and 980,000 visitors annually since 2010. In 2015, readers of USA Today ranked the Indiana State Fair among the ten best state fairs in the country.

The Indiana State Fairgrounds & Event Center has been the host site of the fair since 1892. Located about 4 miles (6.4 km) north of downtown Indianapolis, it encompasses 214 acres (87 ha), 72 buildings, a 6,000-seat grandstand, and a 1-mile (1.6 km) racetrack. The complex is home to year-round tenants and is used throughout the year for a variety of other gatherings, including trade shows, sporting events, and concerts.

== History ==
=== 19th century ===
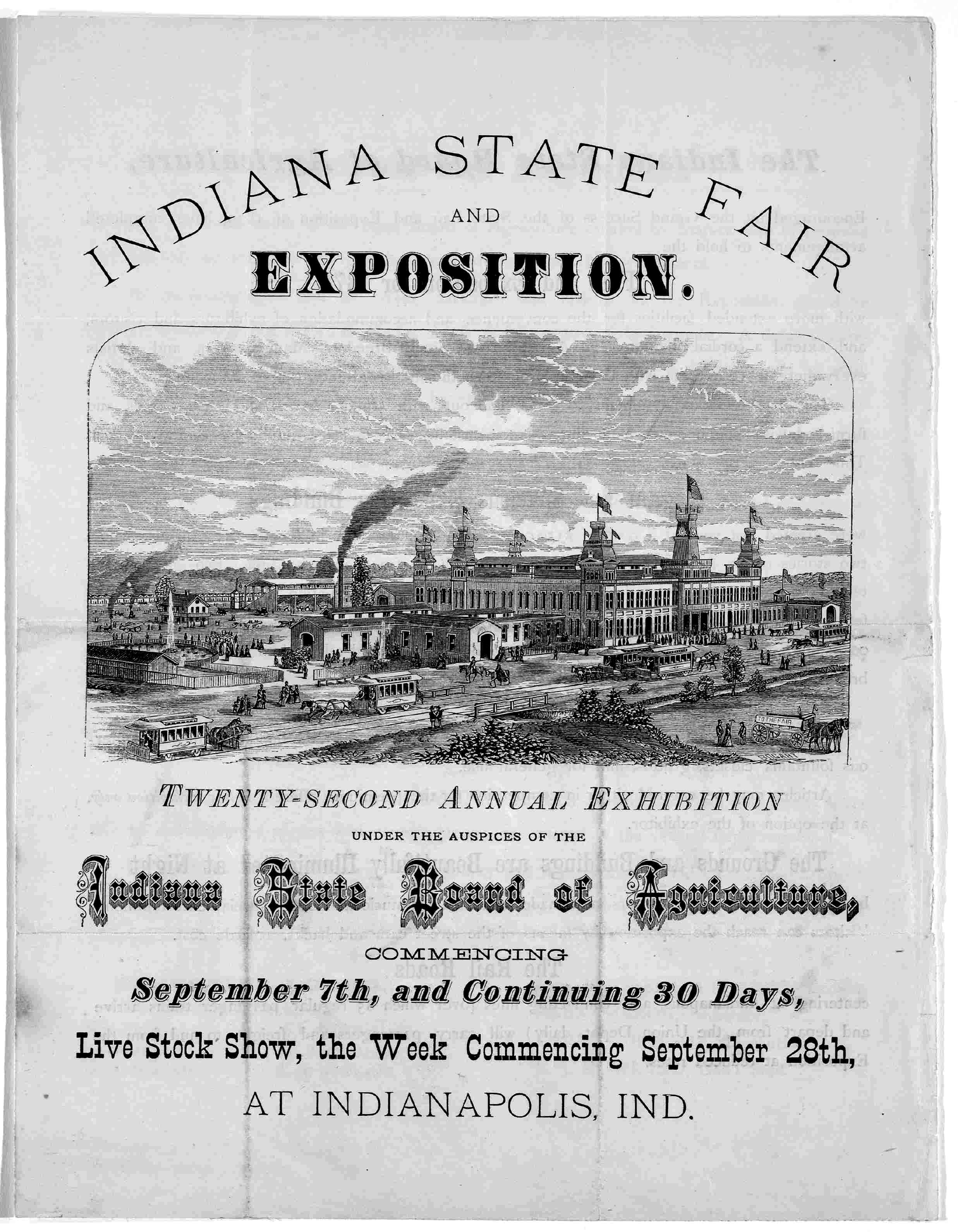
Advertisement for the 1874 state fair

In February 1851, at the urging of Governor Joseph Wright, the Indiana General Assembly passed an act intended "to encourage agriculture" growth in the state, which also included the formation of a State Board of Agriculture. A primary goal of the board was to organize an Indiana State Fair. Indiana was the sixth state to begin holding an annual statewide agricultural fair. On October 20–22, 1852, Indiana's first state fair was held on the grounds of what is now Military Park, west of downtown Indianapolis. In 1860 a new location for the fairgrounds was established on approximately 38 acres (15 ha) along Alabama Street, north of the city.

During the American Civil War, the county fairgrounds was converted into Camp Morton, a prison camp for captured Confederate soldiers. In 1864, a sanitary fair was held as part of the larger state fair. In 1865, the fair was held in Fort Wayne. The gates opened at the Indiana State Fairgrounds on East 38th Street for the first time on September 19, 1892. Since then, the fair has continually been held in Indianapolis.

The Indiana State Fair has been held in Indianapolis for the majority of its existence. Other Indiana cities hosted the event during the 19th century, including Lafayette (1853); Madison (1854); New Albany (1859); Fort Wayne (1865); and Terre Haute (1867).

=== 20th century ===
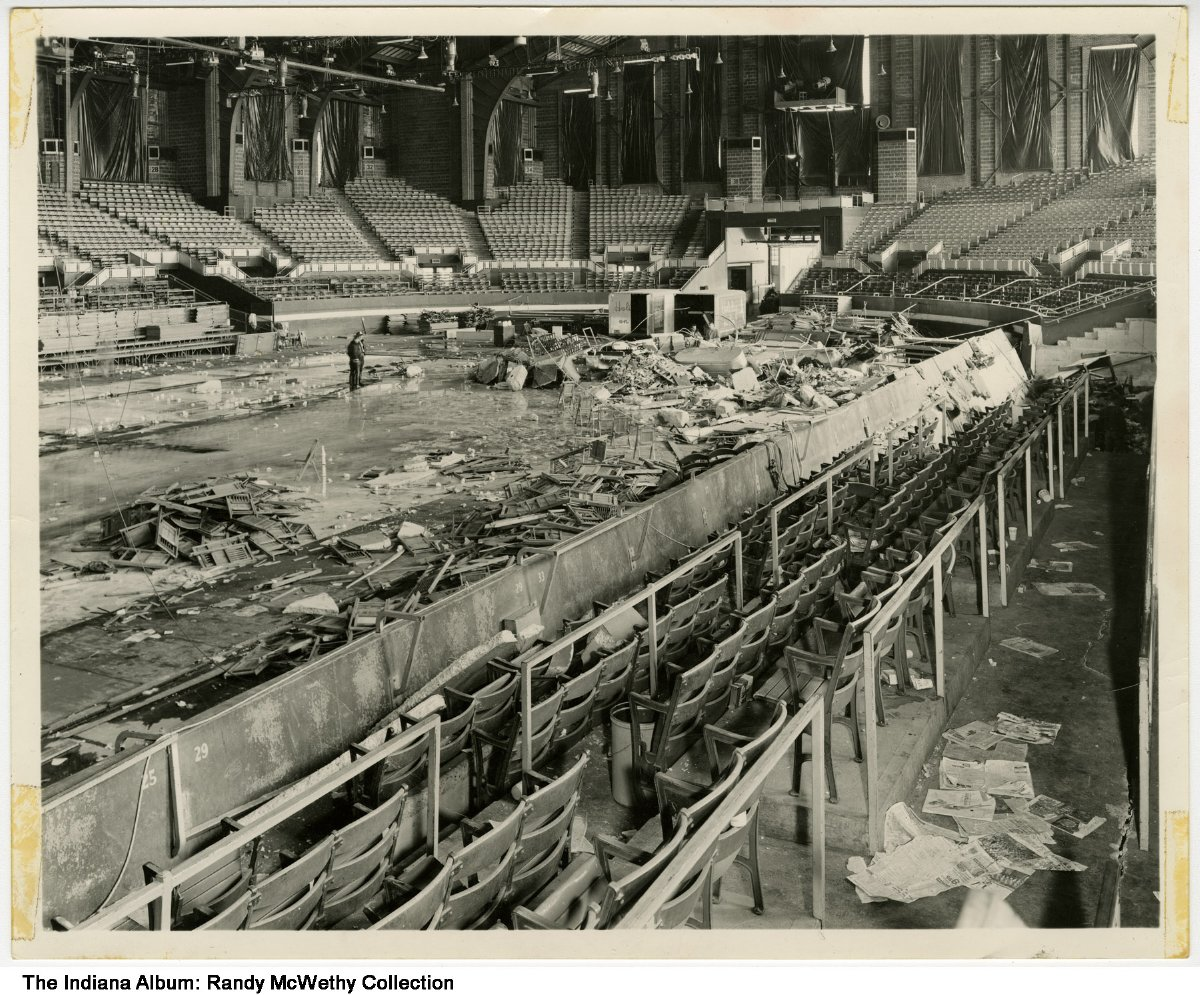
Aftermath of the October 31, 1963 gas explosion.

There was no fair held in 1917 and 1918 because of World War I nor from 1942 to 1944 because of World War II.

On October 31, 1963, a propane tank exploded in the Indiana State Fair Coliseum, killing 54 at the scene; another 27 died due to their injuries, with a total of 81 people killed. Around another 400 were injured. It is the deadliest disaster in Indianapolis history.

=== 21st century ===
Historically, the fair lasted 12 days; however, it was expanded to 17 days (2009–2019), and then to 18 days (2021–2023). Starting in 2024, the event has been condensed down to 15 days.

On August 13, 2011, high winds from an approaching thunderstorm collapsed the roof over the grandstand stage just before Sugarland was about to perform, killing seven people and injuring 58. Concerts were moved indoors to the Fairgrounds Coliseum, and, during that building's renovation in 2013, events were moved to Bankers Life Fieldhouse and Lucas Oil Stadium. The coliseum reopened in 2014.

The COVID-19 pandemic caused the cancellation of the 2020 fair. The fair resumed in 2021 with some social distancing measures, but masks were not required.

== Competitions ==
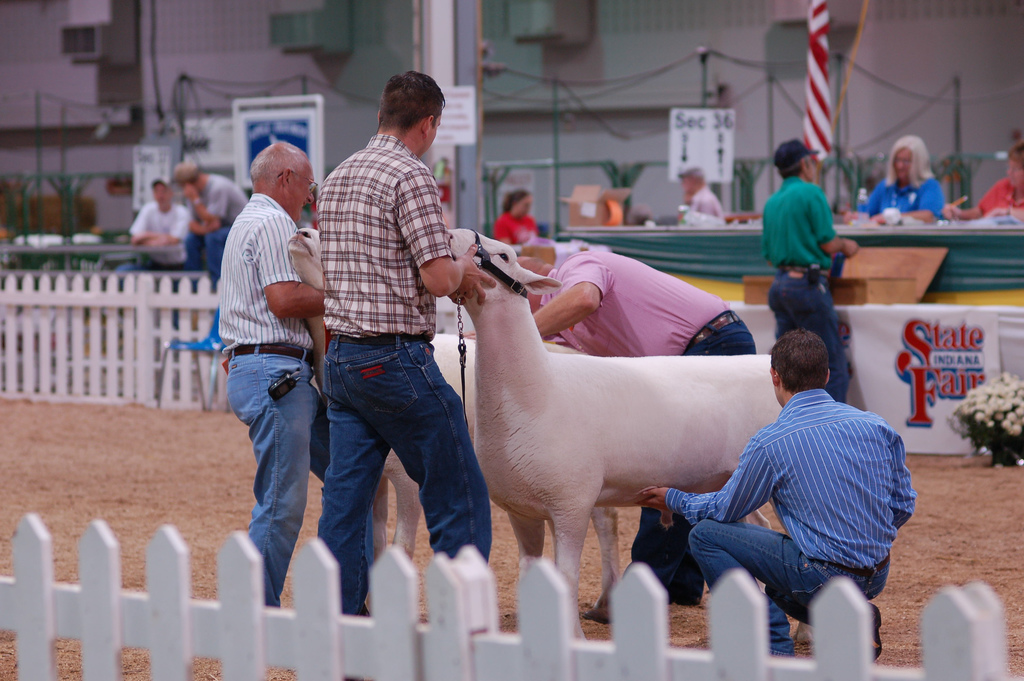
Sheep judging at the 2007 fair

During each annual run of the Indiana State Fair, several competitions take place. The 4-H has a large participation in the fair and competitions are held in numerous areas for 4-H youth members. 4-H winners at county fairs can progress to the state fair with their livestock, crafts, gardening, or other exhibits. The winner at the state fair can, in some cases, advance to a national competition. The winners receive scholarships and other awards.

Other competitions also occur including art contests, a hot air balloon race, and a high school marching band contest, the Indiana State Fair Band Day on "Band Day". Adult competitions also occur in various farm-related categories.

The Indiana State Fairgrounds' mile-long oval track has hosted auto races for over a century. The AAA National Championship and USAC National Championship hosted car races in 1946 and from 1953 to 1970, traditionally under the name Hoosier Hundred. The USAC Silver Crown Series sanctioned the event since 1971. However, the track will be converted to a harness racing facility with an all-weather surface of crushed limestone. The half-mile dirt track in the infield will also be eliminated to allow more parking for the State Fair and other events. The conversion was originally scheduled to occur after the 2019 race, but the conversion was delayed until 2021; the 2021 race was originally scheduled to still be run at the Fairgrounds, but was moved to the Terre Haute Action Track.

== Entertainment ==
=== Midway ===
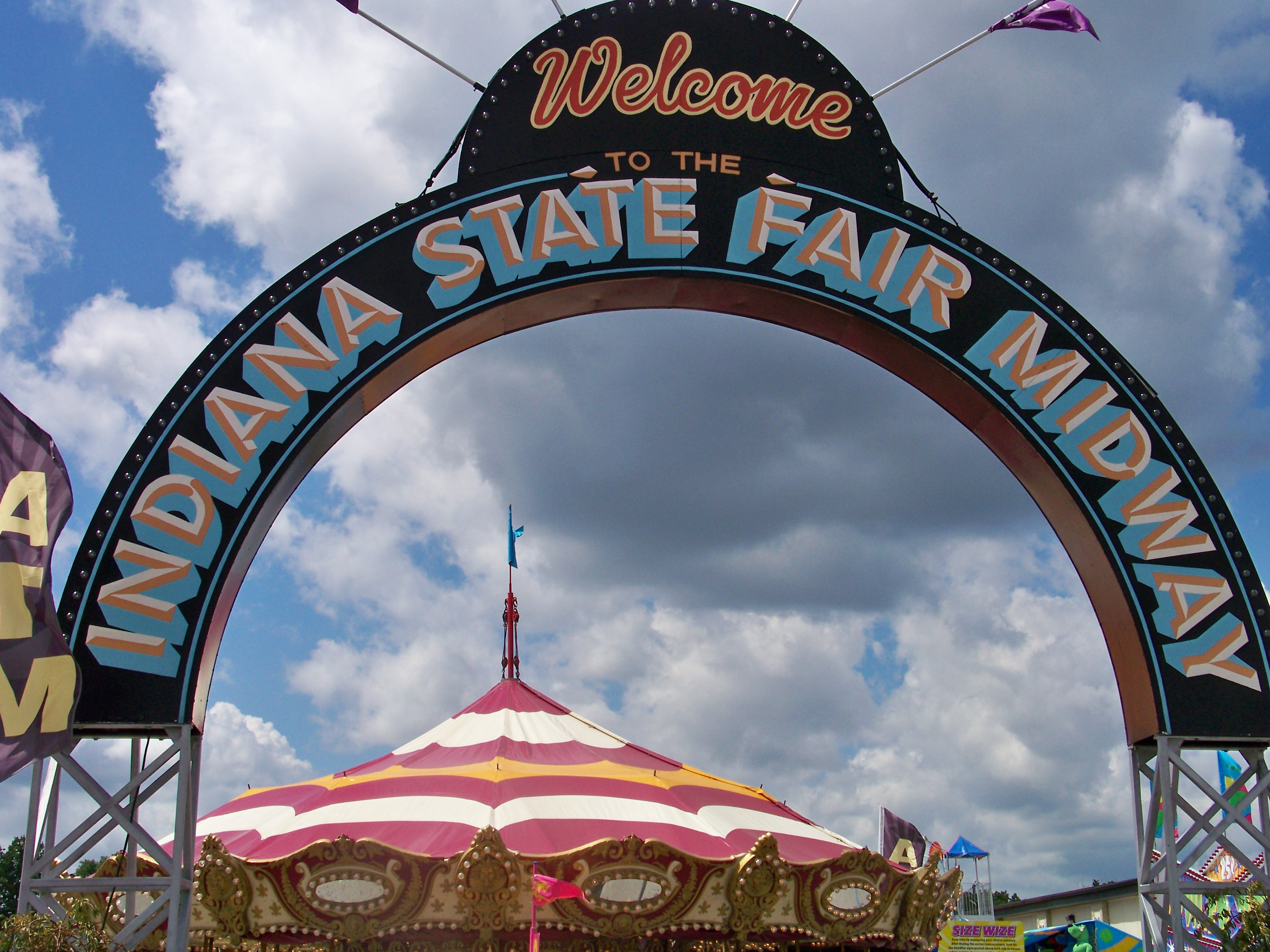
Entrance to the Indiana State Fair Midway in 2008

The Midway is the area of amusement park rides and games. Fairgoers can either buy single-ride tickets or unlimited ride wristbands. Midway rides operate from noon until 10 or 11 pm depending on the day.

=== Performances ===
Numerous nationally known entertainers have performed at the Indiana State Fair.

On September 3, 1964, The Beatles performed two sold-out shows to a total audience of nearly 30,000 and, in 1989, New Kids on the Block set a Grandstand attendance record with 18,509 audience members.

The fair also presents Latino/Hispanic entertainment for Indiana's Hispanic population.

== Presidential visits ==
In 1919, President Woodrow Wilson gave a speech to a crowd of 40,000 on a day known as "Big Thursday." Over the years, Presidents George W. Bush, Bill Clinton, John F. Kennedy, Franklin D. Roosevelt, Barack Obama, and Donald Trump have all made appearances at the fairgrounds.

== Attendance ==
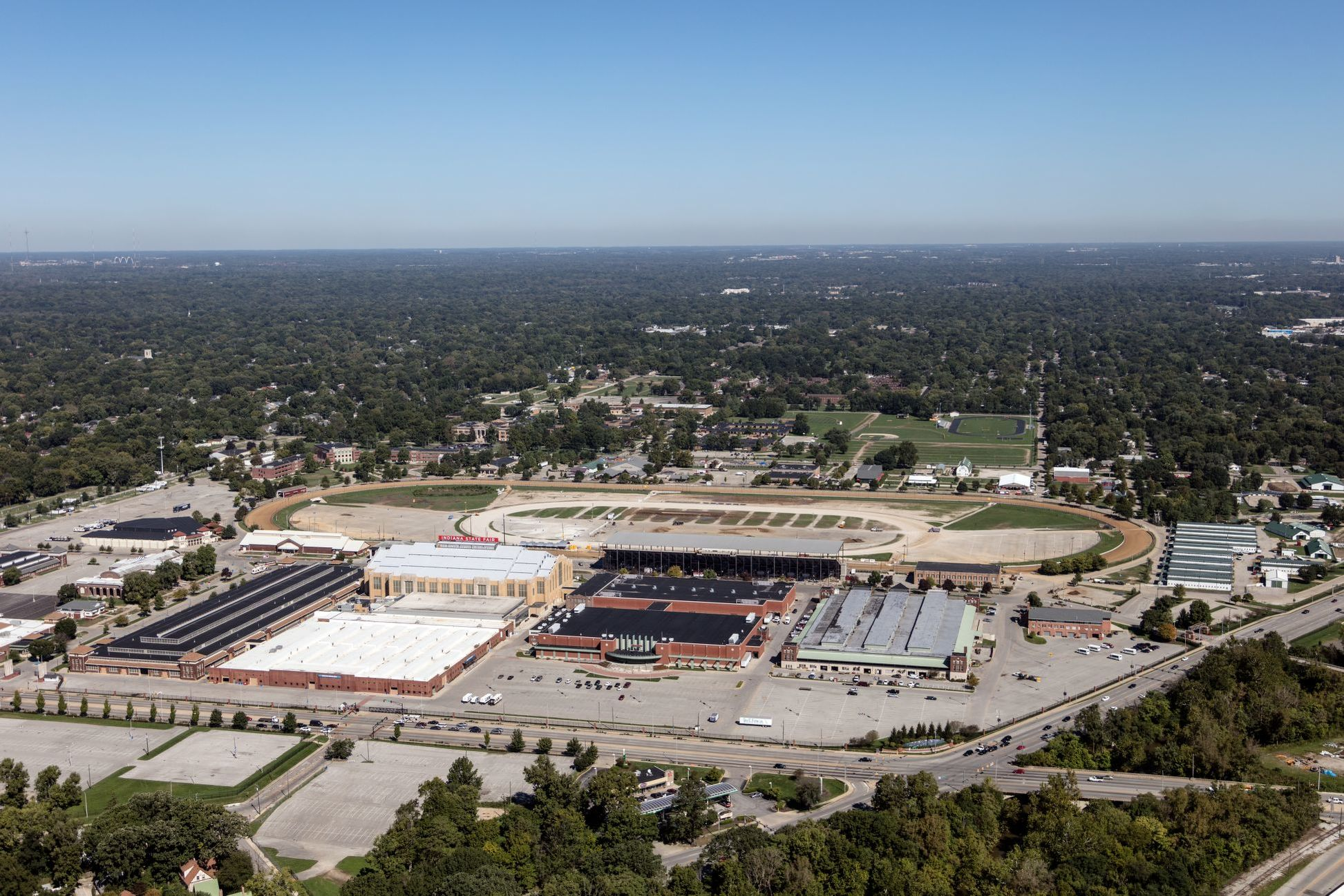
Aerial of Indiana State Fairgrounds & Event Center in 2016

Annual attendance at the Indiana State Fair 1988–2024
Year	Attendance	Year	Attendance	Year	Attendance	Year	Attendance
1988	571,230	1998	▲728,724	2008	▲859,600	2018	▼860,131
1989	▲593,676	1999	▲748,204	2009	▲973,902	2019	▲878,857
1990	▲639,335	2000	▲754,410	2010	▼950,000	2020	canceled
1991	▲676,693	2001	▼731,592	2011	▼872,312	2021	▼830,390
1992	▲722,218	2002	▲796,431	2012	▼853,941	2022	▲837,568
1993	▼689,924	2003	▲878,114	2013	▲978,296	2023	▲840,414
1994	▼672,872	2004	▲900,365	2014	▼954,884	2024	▲854,236
1995	▼591,680	2005	▼820,248	2015	▼907,000	2025	▲854,977
1996	▲701,021	2006	▲870,052	2016	▼731,543		
1997	▼673,167	2007	▼746,421	2017	▲906,732		

== See also ==
- State fair#List of state fairs
- List of attractions and events in Indianapolis
