= List of dirt track ovals in the United States =

Dirt track racing is the single most common form of auto racing in the United States. According to the National Speedway Directory, there are over 700 dirt oval tracks in operation in the US.

The composition of the dirt on tracks has an effect on the amount of grip available. Many tracks use clay with a specific mixture of dirt. Tracks are sometimes banked in the turns and on the straights. This banking is utilized primarily to allow vehicles to carry more speed through the corners. However, some tracks prefer less banked turns.

== Race tracks by state ==
- Alabama
  - New Hollis Speedway
  - North Alabama Speedway
  - Talladega Short Track
- Arkansas
  - Riverside International Speedway
- California
  - Kevin Harvick's Kern Raceway in Bakersfield
  - Perris Auto Speedway
  - Placerville Speedway
  - Santa Maria Speedway
  - Ventura Raceway
  - Watsonville Speedway
- Delaware
  - Delaware International Speedway
  - Georgetown Speedway
- Florida
  - Volusia County Speedway
- Georgia
  - Dixie Speedway
  - Hartwell Speedway
  - Lavonia Speedway
  - South Georgia Motorsports Park
- Illinois
  - Jacksonville Speedway
  - Lincoln Speedway
  - Macon Speedway
- Indiana
  - Kokomo Speedway
  - Terre Haute Action Track
  - Indianapolis Motor Speedway
  - Tri-State Speedway
- Iowa
  - Boone Speedway
  - Crawford County Speedway
  - Davenport Speedway
  - Knoxville Raceway
- Kansas
  - Belleville High Banks
  - Lakeside Speedway
- Maryland
  - Hagerstown Speedway
  - Potomac Speedway
- Minnesota
  - Madison Speedway
  - Ogilvie Raceway
- Missouri
  - Federated Auto Parts Raceway at I-55
  - Missouri State Fair Speedway
  - Lucas Oil Speedway
- Nebraska
  - Eagle Raceway
  - Nebraska Raceway Park
- Nevada
  - Las Vegas Motor Speedway
- New Hampshire
  - The Flat Track
- New Jersey
  - Bridgeport Speedway
  - New Egypt Speedway
- New York
  - Accord Speedway
  - Albany-Saratoga Speedway
  - Brewerton Speedway
  - Can-Am Speedway
  - Fonda Speedway
  - Fulton Speedway
  - Glen Ridge Motorsports Park
  - Land of Legends Raceway
  - Lebanon Valley Speedway
  - Mohawk International Raceway
  - Orange County Fair Speedway
  - Ransomville Speedway
  - Stateline Speedway
  - Utica-Rome Speedway
  - Weedsport Speedway
- North Carolina
  - Charlotte Motor Speedway
- Ohio
  - Eldora Speedway
  - Fremont Speedway
  - Mansfield Speedway
- Oregon
  - Sunset Speedway
- Pennsylvania
  - Grandview Speedway
  - Lernerville Speedway
  - Mercer Raceway Park
  - Port Royal Speedway
  - Selinsgrove Speedway
  - Williams Grove Speedway
- Texas
  - 85 Speedway
  - Cowtown Speedway
  - Royal Purple Raceway
  - Texas Motor Speedway Dirt Track
- Vermont
  - Devil's Bowl Speedway
- West Virginia
  - Tyler County Speedway
- Wisconsin
  - 141 Speedway
  - Angell Park Speedway
  - Beaver Dam Raceway
  - Cedar Lake Speedway
  - Seymour Speedway

== See also ==
- List of NASCAR tracks § Dirt oval tracks
