= Justin Grant =

American racing driver (born 1990)

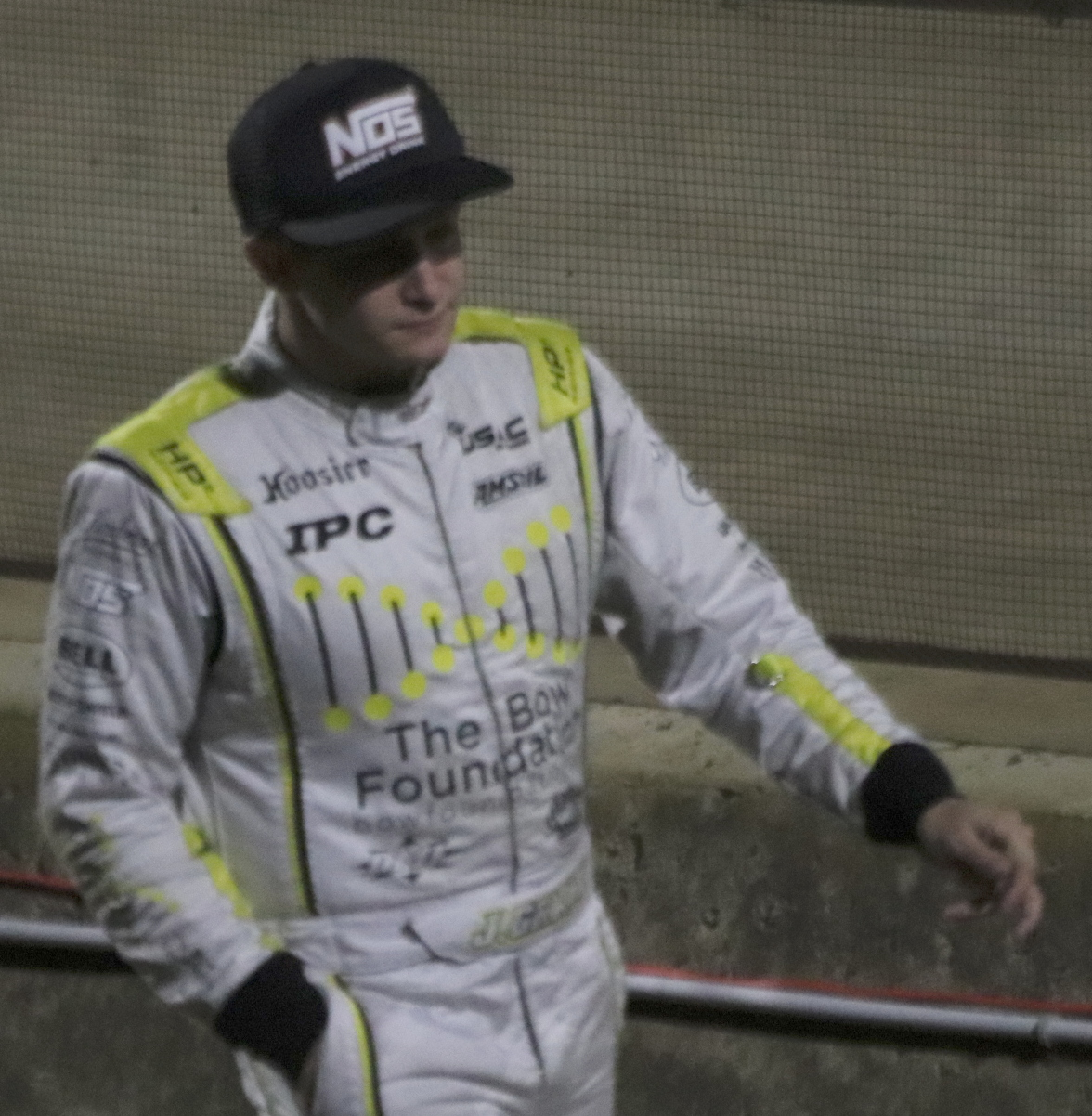
- Grant at Kokomo Speedway in 2018
- Born: Justin Michael Grant; November 12, 1990 (age 35); Ione, California, U.S.
- Achievements: 2020 USAC Silver Crown National Champion; 2022 USAC National Sprint Car Champion

USAC National Midget Series career
- Current team: TOPP Motorsports
- Car number: 4
- Championships: 2 (2020 Silver Crown National, 2022 National Sprint Car)
- Wins: 100
- Best finish: 1st in 2020 (Silver Crown National Champion); 2022 (National Sprint Car Champion)
- Statistics up to date as of July 23, 2026.

Justin Michael Grant (born November 12, 1990) is an American racing driver. Grant is the 2020 USAC Silver Crown National Champion and the 2022 USAC National Sprint Car Champion.

== Racing career ==
=== Midget Racing ===
Grant spent his early career racing midgets in California. At the age of 16, he was crowned the 2007 Bay Cities Racing Association (BCRA) Midget champion.

==== Chili Bowl ====
Grant was tapped to drive the #39BC for Clauson-Marshall Racing in the 2017 Chili Bowl. He won his preliminary qualifying night and started on the pole of the Saturday night feature, where he ultimately finished third behind Christopher Bell and Daryn Pittman.

In 2019, Grant started racing the RAMS Racing/Rockwell Security in the 4a Bullet by Spike/SR-11. In his first Chili Bowl with the new team, Justin won his Friday night preliminary race. On Saturday he started 5th, and finished 3rd behind, Christopher Bell and Kyle Larson.

=== Sprint Car racing ===
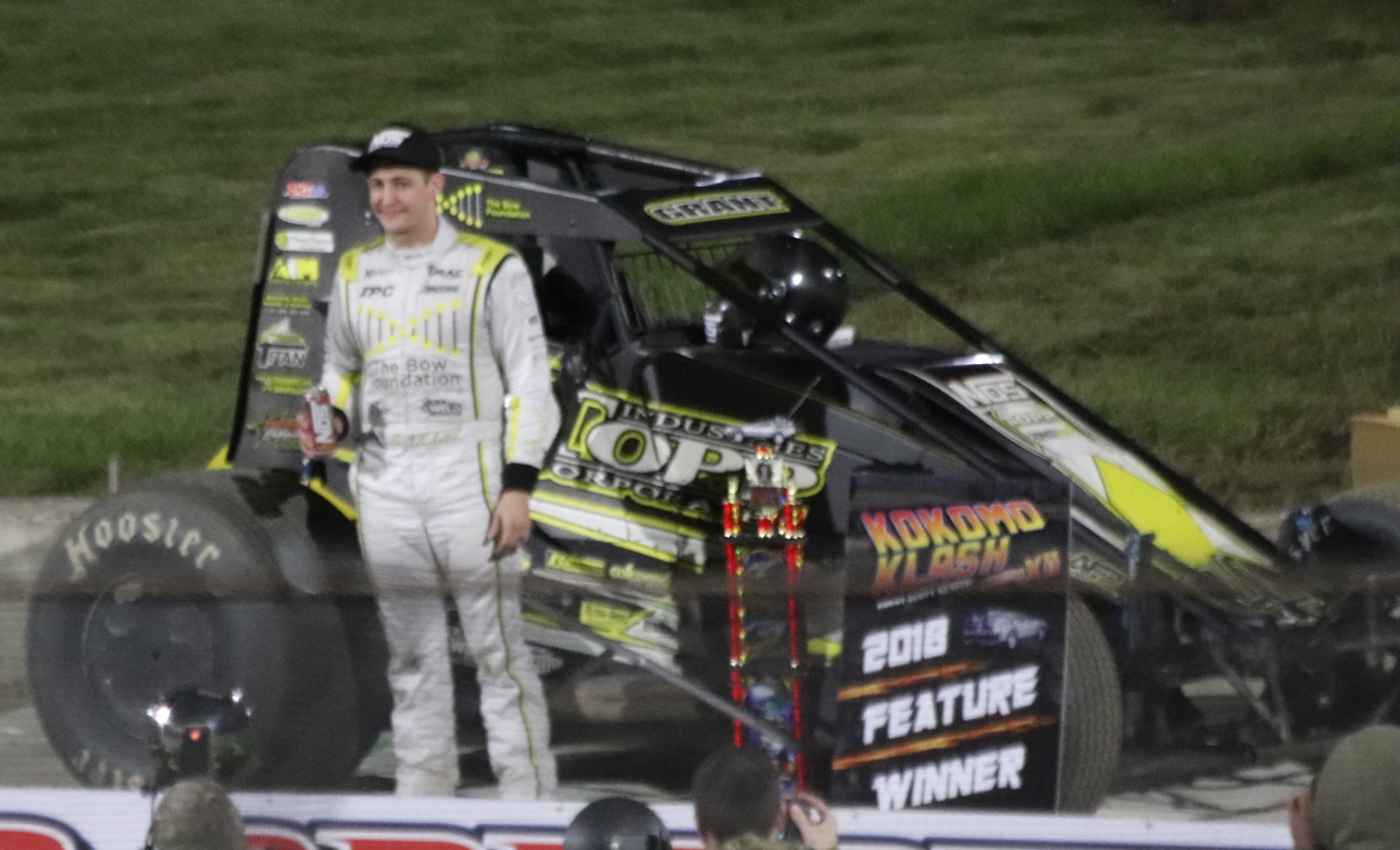
Grant poses for photographers in victory lane at Kokomo Speedway in 2018

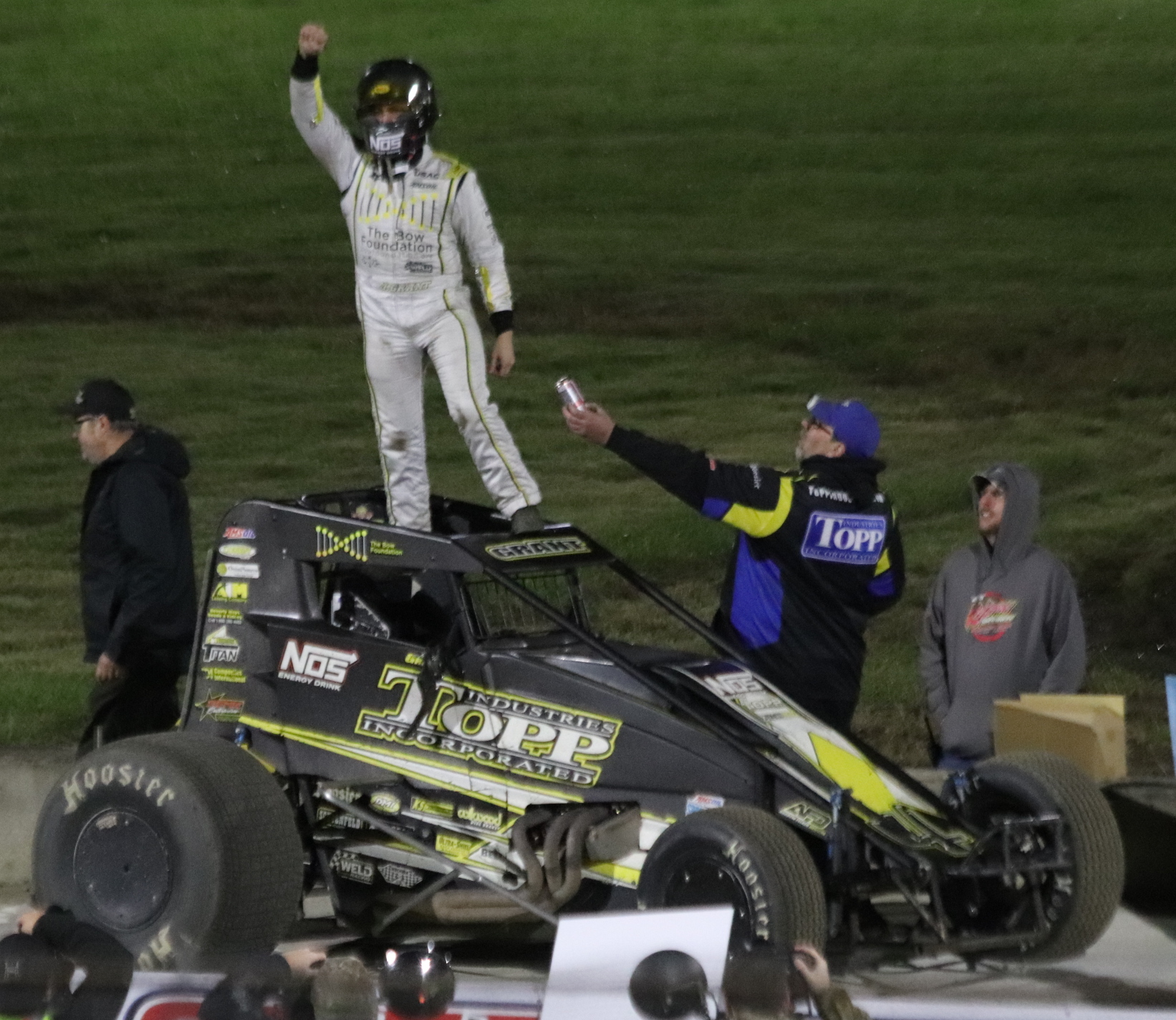
Grant does a fist pump after winning at Kokomo Speedway in 2018

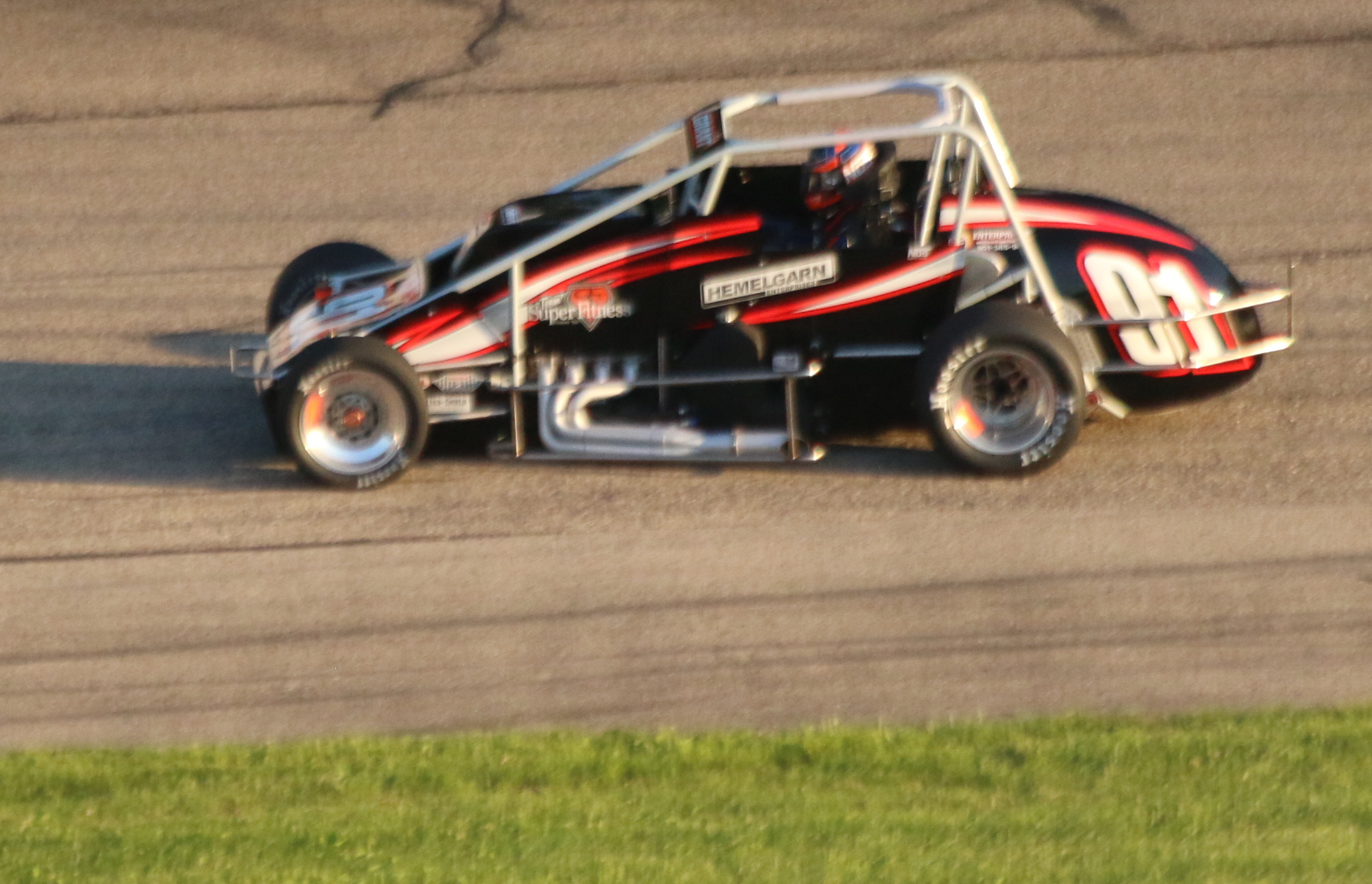
Grant set fast time in his USAC Silver Crown Car at Madison International Speedway in 2018

Grant moved to Indiana in 2009 at the age of 18, initially living and working in sprint car owner Jeff Walker's shop. In 2010, he was named USAC National Sprint Car Series Rookie of the Year, driving for car owner Kenny Baldwin. Over the next several years, he spent time driving for owners Walker, Baldwin, Mark Hery, Rick Pollock, Andrew Elson, Tony Epperson, and Steve & Carla Phillips.

At the tail end of the 2016 season, Grant joined Sam McGhee Motorsports and entered the most successful period of his USAC career, recording 18 top-five finishes in his first 21 USAC races with the team.

=== Silver Crown Racing ===
In 2017, Grant's car owner Chris Carli teamed up with Hemelgarn Racing in the USAC Silver Crown series. After becoming the first driver in USAC history to win the midget and sprint car openers in the same year, Grant had a chance to become the only driver to win the opener for all three series, but engine trouble in the Sumar Classic at the Terre Haute Action Track left that honor unclaimed.

Grant won 2020 USAC Silver Crown championship; he had no wins during the season.

He scored his 100th national series win at the Indianapolis Motor Speedway dirt track.

== Motorsports career results ==
(key)

=== USAC Sprint Car results ===
Year	Team	Car #	1	2	3	4	5	6	7	8	9	10	11	12	13	14	15	16	17	18	19	20	21	22	23	24	25	26	27	28	29	30	31	32	33	34	35	36	37	38	39	40	41	42	43	44	45	46	47	Rank	Points
2012	Hery	40	OCA	OCA; C	OCA; 3	GAS	ELD	LAW; C	LPS	TSS	BLM	THAT	LER	GRND; DNP	NES; DNP	BDS	PRS	WIL	ANG	GAS; DNQ	KOK; DNQ	LAW	THAT	LPS	BLM	TSS	EAG; 10	VAL	US36	OSK	OSK	I96	HAR	KOK; DNQ	KOK; 21	KOK; DNQ	TCS	THAT	RIV	TSS	ELD; DNP	LAW	DCRP	DCRP	CAN	CAN	PAS; DNP	PAS; DNP			
2013	Walker	11	OCA; 16	OCA; 21	OCA; 13	LAW; 13	ELD; C	GAS; 20	US36; C	EAG; C																		KOK; DNQ	KOK; DNP	KOK; DNP	34R; 4	THAT; 14	I30; DNP	RIV; DNP	TSS; DNP																
2013	Pollock	21x									TSS; DNQ	BLM; DNP	GRND; DNP	PVS; C	PRS; DNP	SUS; DNP	THAT; C	I96; DNP	LPS; DNP				THAT; 23	LPS; DNQ	BLM; 7	TSS; C	OSK; 5																								
2013	Elson	27a																		GAS; 14	KOK; 24	LAW; 7														ELD; 8	LAW; 5														
2013	Baldwin	5																																				CAN; 15	CAN; 3	PAS; 10	PAS; DNF										
2014	Hery	40	OCA; 6	OCA; 2	LAW; 1	ELD; 8	GAS; 12	TSS; 6	EAG; 2	JUN; 10	THAT; 20	GRND; 4	LIN; C	NES; 7	PRS; 7	SUS; C	AMS; C	DCS; 8	ANG; 14	LPS; DNP	GAS; 2	KOK; 2	LAW; C	THAT; 6	LPS; DNF	BLM; 7	TSS; 20	KOK; 22	KOK; 2	KOK; 6	TSS; DNP	THAT; 13	ELD; 3	LAW; 4	PAS; 15	PAS; 26	CAN; 10	CAN; 6												7th	1508
2015	Hery	40	OCA; 5	OCA; 12	OCA; 6	EAS; 22	EAS; 4	LAW; 9	BLM; 15	TSS; 19	EAG; DNP	LAK; DNP	ELD; DNF	ELD; 1	GAS; 11	NES; 12	PRS; 8	SUS; 7	LPS; DNP	GAS; 19	LAW; 3																													10th	1282
2015	Baldwin	5																				THAT; 8	LPS; DNQ	TSS; 8	AMS; DNF	CED; 4	ANG; 6	KOK; DNP	KOK; 13	KOK; 24	KOK; 7	THAT; 14	TSS; 21	ELD; DNQ	LAW; 13	PAS; 9	PAS; 18	PAS; 11	ARI; DNQ	ARI; 17										10th	1282
2016	Baldwin	5	OCA; 7	OCA; 6	OCA; 5	LAW; 9	BLM; 15	TSS; 12	MON; 10	ELD; 17	ELD; DNP																																							14th	1073
2016	Epperson	2E										GAS; 15	BRO; DNP	THAT; 10	GRND; DNP	LIN; DNP	LIN; DNP	NES; DNP	PRS; DNP	SUS; DNP	JAC; DNP	EAG; DNP	LAK; DNP	LAK; DNP	LPS; DNP																									14th	1073
2016	Phillips	71p																								GAS; 15	KOK; DNQ	LAW; 6	LPS; 17	BLM; DNQ	TSS; DNP	THAT; DNP																		14th	1073
2016	Sam McGhee	17																															BAD; 3	BAD; 2	KOK; 5	KOK; 8	KOK; 6	KOK; 2	TSS; 8	ELD; 1	LAW; 5	THAT; 5	ARI; DNP	ARI; DNP	PAS; DNP	PAS; DNP	PAS; DNP			14th	1073
2017	Sam McGhee	11	OCA; C	OCA; 1	OCA; 2	LAW; 3	BLM; 4	TSS; 3	PLY; 1	MON; C	ELD; 1	ELD; 4	GRA; C	PEV; C	THAT; C	I80; 3	KNX; 1	GRND; 5	LIN; 20	WGS; 4	PRS; 2	SUS; 3	THAT; C	LPS; C	KOK; DNF	LAW; 14	GAS; 8	BLM; 16	TSS; 4	LPS; 6	LAK; 2	RAN; 3	KOK; DNQ	KOK; 22	KOK; 8	KOK; 6	THAT; 4	TSS; 10	ELD; 5	MON; DNF	LAW; 3	THAT; 7	ARI; 19	ARI; 8	PAS; 9	PAS; 4	PAS; 2			2nd	2284

*Season still in progress

=== USAC Midget results ===
Year	Team	Car #	1	2	3	4	5	6	7	8	9	10	11	12	13	14	15	16	17	18	19	20	21	22	23	24	25	26	Rank	Points
2016	Gardner	38	DUQ; DNQ	KOK; C	KOK; C	MON; DNP	GAS; 13	LPS; DNP	BLM; DNP	LAW; DNP	KOK; DNP	RIV; DNP	RIV; DNP	JEF; DNP	SOL; DNP	BHB; DNP	BHB; DNP	SUS; C	PVS; C	LAN; DNP	LIN; C	ELD; DNP	GRA; DNP	GRA; DNP	GRA; DNP	WCS; DNQ	VEN; DNP	DUQ; DNP	-	-
2017	Clauson-Marshall	39BC	DUQ; 1	KOK; 6	KOK; 20	GRA; C	MON; 7	GAS; 15	LPS; 5	BLM; 2	LAW; 7	KOK; 4	MAC; 4	LIN; 6	SPR; 11	JEF; 22	SOL; 2	BHB; 5	BHB; 7	SUS; 1	PVS; DNF	LANC; DNF	LIND; 5	ELD; DNF	WCS; C	BAK; 5	VEN; 7		5th	1316
2018	Clauson-Marshall	17BC	DUQ; 5	KOK; 5	KOK; C	MON; 17	GAS; C	LPS; 2	BLM; C	LAW; DNF	KOK; DNF	RDR; 6	SOL; 3	JEF; 1	JEF; 9	SWT; 7	PVS; DNF	LIND	LANC	SUS	ELD	BAK	VEN						5th*	679*

*Season still in progress

=== USAC Silver Crown results ===
Year	Team	Car #	1	2	3	4	5	6	7	8	9	10	11	Rank	Points
2015	Chris Carli	8	TOL; DNP	IND; 5	IRP; DNP	IOW; DNP	THAT; 6	IRP; DNP	BHB; 3	SPR; 17	DUQ; 4	ELD; 6	SYR; 8	9th	304
2016	Chris Carli	8	THAT; 2	TOL; C	IND; 16	IRP; 6	WGS; 5	GMP; 6	IRP; 7	SAL; 5	SPR; C	DUQ; 19	ELD; 2	3rd	474
2017	Hemelgarn Racing	91	THAT; 22	PHX; DNF	IND; C	IRP; DNF	WGS; 9	IRP; 6	TOL; 10	SAL; 7	SPR; 1	DUQ; 6	ELD; 6	4th	470
2018	Hemelgarn Racing	91	PHX; 3	THAT; 1	TOL; 10	IND; DNF	IRP; 6	MAD; 3	SAL; 6	SPR; 3	DUQ	IRP	ELD	2nd*	446*

*Season still in progress

=== Chili Bowl results ===
			Prelim Night				Championship Night	
Year	Team	Car #	Heat Start	Heat Finish	Feature Start	Feature Finish	Feature Start	Feature Finish
2012	Gardner	35	1	1		14	C-main	C-main (7)
2015	Gardner	38	3	2	10	17	C-main (14)	C-main (DNF)
2016	Gardner	38	6	2	9	8	23	DNF
2017	Clauson-Marshall Racing	39BC	8	3	1	1	1	3
2018	Clauson-Marshall Racing	39BC	4	1	2	1	4	7
