= Early life and career of Jeff Gordon =

Jeff Gordon
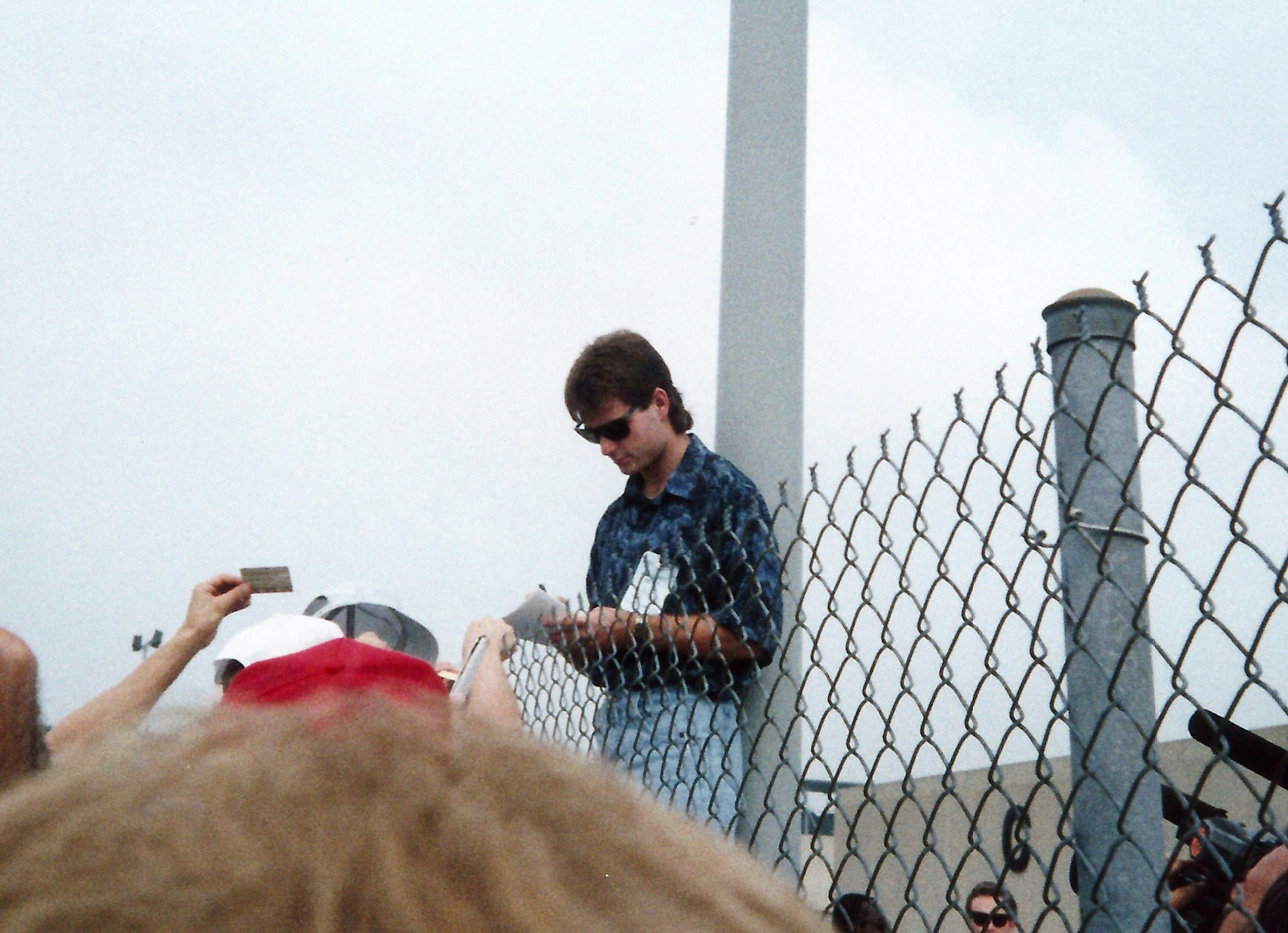
- Gordon in August 1993
- Born: Jeffery Michael Gordon; August 4, 1971 (age 55); Vallejo, California, U.S.
- Occupation: Racing driver
- Years active: 1976–1992 (early career)

NASCAR O'Reilly Auto Parts Series career
- 62 races run over 3 years
- Best finish: 4th (1992)
- First race: 1990 AC-Delco 200 (Rockingham)
- Last race: 1992 The Pantry 300 (Hickory)
- First win: 1992 Atlanta 300 (Atlanta)
- Last win: 1992 All Pro 300 (Charlotte)
Wins	Top tens	Poles
3	25	12
- Statistics up to date as of November 8, 1992 (Note: This article covers Gordon's life before his NASCAR Cup Series career; therefore, these statistics span Gordon's NASCAR Busch Grand National Series career from 1990 to 1992 only. See the parent article Jeff Gordon for statistics spanning his entire career, including his results in the series from 1999 to 2000 while driving for his own team.).

Championship titles
- 1990 USAC National Midget Series Champion; 1991 USAC Silver Crown Series Champion

Awards
- 1990 HARF Driver of the Year; 1990, 1991 AARWBA All America Team; 1991 Busch Series Rookie of the Year; 1992 Pat O'Connor Award recipient 1994 HARF Hall of Fame inductee 2005 Vallejo Sports Hall of Fame inductee 2009 National Midget Auto Racing Hall of Fame inductee

Jeffery Michael "Jeff" Gordon (born August 4, 1971) is an American professional auto racing driver who competed in the NASCAR Cup Series over a 25-year career. He was born in Vallejo, California to Carol Houston and Billy Gordon; the couple separated a few months later. Gordon's mother then married John Bickford, a car builder and parts supplier.

When Gordon was four years old, his stepfather gave him a BMX bike that he rode at a track near his home. At age five, Gordon began competing in Quarter Midget racing locally. He won 35 main events, set five track records, and earned a local championship by age six. In 1979, Gordon began racing quarter midgets nationally; that year he won 52 main events and set eight track records. At age nine, Gordon began competing in kart racing, and by age twelve, he had won over 200 races in Quarter Midgets and go-karts. Gordon briefly attempted waterskiing before returning to racing.

At age thirteen, Gordon became interested in sprint car racing, and he competed in his first sprint car events in Florida. Under California law, the minimum age to drive a sprint car was 16. In 1986, with Gordon's family supporting his career choice, he moved from Vallejo to Pittsboro, Indiana. At age sixteen, Gordon became the youngest driver ever awarded a USAC license. He was named the 1989 USAC National Midget Series Rookie of the Year, and captured the series championship in 1990. In 1991, Gordon won the USAC Silver Crown Series championship; at age twenty he was the youngest driver to do so.

While competing in sprint cars, Gordon was looking for new opportunities in racing. An impressive stint in a stock car at the North Carolina Motor Speedway, as part of the Buck Baker Racing School, led to a three-race deal from businessman Hugh Connerty to compete in the Busch Grand National Series late in the 1990 season, with Ray Evernham as the crew chief. Gordon qualified second for his first race but crashed twenty-three laps into the event, and he failed to qualify for his other two races. At the end of the season, Gordon and Connerty amicably parted ways when the latter could not secure funding and sponsorship to continue. Gordon later reached a deal with car owner Bill Davis to compete in the Busch Grand National Series full-time for the 1991 season, under crew chief Keith Simmons. Gordon was named the 1991 series Rookie of the Year with five top-five finishes and a pole. Gordon returned to Bill Davis Racing for the 1992 season; he was reunited with Evernham for his sophomore season. Gordon earned his first series victory at Atlanta Motor Speedway in March, and swept both races at Charlotte Motor Speedway held in May and October. Gordon ended the season with a record 11 poles and a fourth-place points finish, before joining Hendrick Motorsports in the Winston Cup Series.

== Childhood ==
=== Birth and family background ===
Gordon was born on August 4, 1971, at Kaiser Hospital in Vallejo, California, and named Jeffery Michael Gordon. He is the son of Caroline and William G. Gordon II. He is the couple's second child; they have a daughter, Kimberly "Kim" Coykendall, who is older than Jeff by four years. Gordon is of Scotch-Irish descent. At the time of his birth, Gordon's family lived at 208 Westwood Street.

Gordon's mother and biological father separated when he was a few months old. (Note: In the authorized biography Jeff Gordon: His Dream, Drive & Destiny (2016), author Joe Garner wrote that the couple separated when Jeff was three months old, although in the Motor Racing Network podcast Jeff Gordon: A Colorful Career (2019), host Brian Nelson stated that the couple separated when Jeff was six months old. According to a February 1993 article in Stock Car Racing, and an episode of the ESPN biography television program SportsCentury, the couple divorced when Jeff was a year old.) In January 1972, Carol was hired to work in the billing department for a medical supply company called Robin-Aids. As a single mother, Carol worked to support her two children. Through her job, Carol met John Bickford, who worked for the company as a designer. Bickford, who was involved in racing as a car builder and parts supplier, was divorced from a woman named Rosie and had a son together, John Jr. When Bickford met Carol, he was due to be married again, but his second marriage was annulled after just four months. Bickford moved on and asked Carol out on a date to an auto race during Labor Day weekend. Carol brought her two children to the event at Vallejo Speedway, marking Jeff's first trip to a race track at a year old. Carol and John were married in May 1973. The family resided at 534 Brooke Drive in Vallejo.

=== BMX racing ===
When Gordon was four years old, Billy gave his son a secondhand bicycle. John challenged his stepson to attempt to learn how to ride the bicycle without training wheels. Within a day, Gordon learned how to ride with help from Carol. He then asked John to take him to a track used for BMX racing in their neighborhood. Before letting his stepson compete, John bought a new bike and customized the frame to fit Jeff's body. The BMX bike was given to Gordon for his birthday. He began to practice with John at the track, and later competed in sanctioned racing there. Gordon earned a third-place trophy in his first race. He advanced to the 1976 state championships, in which he finished fourth overall. At age five, Gordon was competing against children older and bigger than him. When one of Gordon's competitors broke an arm in a crash, Carol successfully convinced John to make Jeff quit racing bicycles after just a few months, due to the number of injuries and concussions in the sport.

=== Quarter Midget and kart racing ===
John purchased two Quarter Midget cars from Paul Stornetta of Napa, California for US$450 ($2,428 in 2023 dollars), and brought them home to Gordon's surprise. Although Carol was not pleased at first, John convinced her that Quarter Midgets are safer, and she later drove with her son on a makeshift track John created at the Solano County Fairgrounds. Gordon's first car, which was black, was known as the "fuzz car." In this car, Gordon ran over an estimated 2,000 laps around a flat surface at the fairgrounds. Gordon's stepfather and mother then took him to the Cracker Jack Track (now known as the Roy Hayer Memorial Speedway) in Rio Linda, California, to learn. While Gordon was in kindergarten, he practiced after school up to three days a week, logging laps in while competing against a stopwatch John used. Gordon was licensed to race by track official Tom Van Inwagen, earning his first racing license in April 1977 at five years old. Gordon made his first competitive laps at the Cracker Jack Track. In one of his first attempts at the track, Gordon flipped the car in turn two and snapped the rear axle. It took John an hour to repair the car for Gordon, who crashed it twice more in the same spot. After another repair, Gordon posted the fastest time out of the eight children competing. A month later, Gordon earned his first trophy with a four-place finish. In July, Gordon won the 1977 Western States Novice championship at Baylands Quarter Midget Track in Sunnyvale, California, and the "fuzz car" was retired after just a few months in competition. By age six, Gordon had won 35 main events and set five track records. It was around this time when Gordon's stepfather was accused of using illegal parts and rigging a hot car to gain a competitive advantage. Bickford often sold Jeff's cars to his competitors in response, later building similar vehicles which Gordon would drive to victory. Early in his career, Gordon was featured in segments on Kids Are People Too and PM Magazine, and was the subject of an episode for a series titled Super Kids. He was featured in Vallejo Times Herald in 1978, at age six.

In 1979, Gordon began competing in Quarter Midgets nationally, racing every week. He won his first Grand National championship in Denver, Colorado; scored 52 victories and set eight track records; and won the Pacific Northwest Indoor championships. In 1980, Gordon posted the fastest time in all fifty races he entered and scored 46 victories. Gordon finished second in the 1981 Grand National championship held in Oklahoma.

When Gordon was nine years old, he began competing in kart racing. In his first race in a go-kart, Gordon scored a victory in a major International Kart Federation event. Gordon won all 25 races he entered in his first year of karting competition, and won all 12 races he entered in his second year. Between 1981 and 1982, Gordon won three California State Monza Championships; he also won his second Grand National championship in Sunnyvale during the latter year. By the age of twelve, Gordon had won over two hundred races in Quarter Midgets and go-karts.

One of Gordon's fondest go-kart memories was competing against former Olympic gold medalist Caitlyn Jenner (formerly known as Bruce Jenner) in Corona, California.

=== Waterskiing ===
As Gordon was about to reach adolescence, he "got bored" of racing regularly. With support from his parents, Gordon began practicing waterskiing at age twelve. Gordon's stepfather enrolled him in professional ski schools, and by age thirteen, coaches from California State University, Sacramento scouted him. Gordon learned how to slalom but struggled with jumping. Although Gordon had fun with waterskiing, he believed he was not tall enough to be competitive.

=== Other hobbies ===
Gordon became interested in video games by age five, with Pong and Indy 500 being early favorite titles. He also enjoyed skateboarding, and idolized Tony Hawk. Gordon learned how to breakdance in Vallejo, where it was popular among his peers in his junior high school. Gordon would sneak into the bathroom to breakdance because it was not allowed in the hallways.

== Education summary ==
School	Location	Type	Degree/notes
Pennycook Elementary School	Vallejo, California	Public	
Springstowne Middle School	Vallejo, California	Public	
Tri-West Hendricks High School	Lizton, Indiana	Public	High school diploma, 1989

== Sprint car and midget racing ==
Between 1983 and 1984, Gordon competed in limited races as he was searching for a transition in his career. He attended his first Indianapolis 500 as a spectator in 1983 and met his favorite driver, Rick Mears. Gordon also became interested in sprint car racing and attended local events, rooting for Steve Kinser. Gordon aspired to become a sprint car driver after reading a story about a young driver named Sport Allen.

In October 1984, Gordon competed in an event in Indianapolis, where he won both races. Following the event, John introduced Jeff to Lee Osborne, a former driver who operated a business in Jamestown, Indiana building sprint cars. John was interested in buying a used motor and a sprint car chassis for Jeff. Osborne assumed John was in the market for himself, not Gordon. When John revealed his intentions for his stepson, Osborne initially refused to build a sprint car for Gordon. Despite receiving a rundown of Gordon's past racing success, Osborne still was not convinced that the thirteen-year-old Gordon could handle a sprint car. After heading back home in California, John continued to talk to Osborne by phone, later successfully convincing him after weeks of discussions. By the end of November, a new Osborne sprint chassis arrived at Gordon's home. John and Jeff worked on the sprint car for months. When it was complete, the car was loaded onto a trailer to Dixon, California, where Gordon first attempted to start the car on a gravel road.

=== 1985–1986 ===
==== Florida Speedweek ====
In February 1985, Gordon traveled to Florida to compete in Speedweek, a series of racing events sanctioned by the All Star Circuit of Champions. Speedweek consisted of five nights of racing on two tracks: Jax Raceway in Jacksonville and East Bay Raceway in Tampa. Unlike in California, Florida had no age requirement for sprint car racing. Despite this, upon Gordon's arrival in Jacksonville, there was buzz among the racers and fans regarding Gordon's age and physical appearance. The owner of the Jax Raceway attempted to prevent Gordon from competing at the track. Series official Bert Emrick also voiced concern to John over letting Gordon compete in the races.

In Jacksonville, Gordon recorded his first laps in a sprint car during a practice session. These "hot laps" proved to be difficult for Gordon, who started off slowly in a field of fast drivers. When the car finally took off, Gordon lost control while making a turn, shooting the back end around and hitting the wall with the right rear tire. Gordon confronted his stepfather in the pits, believing he was not prepared and capable of racing the faster sprint cars. The features in Jacksonville were cancelled due to rain, which allowed Gordon to calm down for the night and turn his attention to the next four races in Tampa. At East Bay, Gordon was again faced with disapproval from Emrick, who had allowed Gordon to compete in the hot laps at Jax. John convinced Emrick to allow Gordon to race if he started in the back, a move that required a liability waiver. Bickford made it to clear to Jeff that they were not competing to try to win, but "we were there for the experience, for the laps." By the third night in Tampa, Gordon was running competitive lap times. On the final night, Gordon qualified for the C main event; he started sixth and finished second in a field of twelve drivers. With that performance, he advanced to the B main event, where he started sixteenth in a field of twenty-two drivers; he moved up to the top ten but briefly pulled off the track after dirt from the track wedged into his helmet, resulting in a seventeenth-place finish. Gordon qualified eighteenth in a field of fifty-four for the overall event. This earned Gordon his first racing purse from a professional series, which was worth a little over $300 ($856 in 2023 dollars). Following his performance in Florida that week, Gordon was featured on ESPN's SpeedWeek.

Gordon returned to Florida for the 1986 Speedweek, this time without opposition from series officials. He improved on his results from the previous year, advancing to the A main event in four of five races and finishing in the top twenty each time. At the final race in Tampa, Gordon started near the front and took the lead from Rick Ferkel four laps into the event. Later trailing Gordon in second was Steve Kinser. They traded the lead before Kinser overtook Gordon in the final laps. Kinser drove to victory, while Bobby Davis and Keith Kauffman also finished ahead of Gordon, who ended up in fourth. Afterwards, Kinser found Gordon in the garage area and shook hands, telling him "you're going to be a good one."

==== Limited opportunities in California ====
In March 1985, Gordon was allowed to practice in a sprint car at Kings Speedway, a track located in Hanford, California. Despite impressing veteran drivers and receiving an invitation to return to Hanford, Gordon continued to face challenges looking for sprint car opportunities statewide. When Cary Agajanian, a Los Angeles attorney and son of the late racing figure J. C. Agajanian, refused to let Gordon compete at Ascot Park due to legal matters, other local racing promoters took notice and banned Gordon as well. However, Agajanian helped Gordon by drafting a document that would give him partial emancipation, thus allowing Gordon to sign liability waivers from tracks in other various areas. Agajanian is commonly viewed as being responsible for Gordon's exit from California.

==== Midwest racing ====
Following the conclusion of the school year, Gordon and his stepfather hit the road with the sprint car and traveled throughout the Midwestern United States, participating in racing events each week during the summer of 1985. They lived in an apartment in Findlay, Ohio during this time. Gordon was introduced to tracks such as Millstream Speedway in Findlay; KC Raceway in Chillicothe, Ohio; and Bloomington Speedway in Bloomington, Indiana. He earned his first sprint car victory in a heat race at Millstream. Gordon primarily raced on the All Star circuit, in which he competed in twenty-two races and advanced to twelve A main events in his first season. Beginning in September 1985, John and Carol worked for extra money to give Jeff an opportunity to race and relocate in the Midwest. Gordon earned his first main event victory in a sprint car at KC Raceway in 1986.

==== Move to Pittsboro, Indiana ====
In June 1986, Gordon formally moved from his birthplace of Vallejo to Pittsboro, Indiana. Prior to that, Gordon's mother traveled alone to Pittsboro in search of a home for the family to live in, while he and his stepfather were racing. After Carol picked out a house and signed the contract, she stayed in Indiana until Jeff and John arrived to see the property for the first time, giving their sprint car a new base. Carol briefly remained in California to run the medical supply business, which she and John eventually sold part of, along with the family house in Vallejo. John built a shop behind the new house in Pittsboro, which he used to make and sell sprint car parts. Jeff earned money on the side by fabricating sprint car parts for Shirley Kear. By this time, Gordon's race earnings became the family's primary source of income.

The decision to move had been made the previous year, after Gordon began racing in the Midwest. It had no effect on Gordon's sister Kimberly, who graduated from high school in the spring and began attending San Diego State University in the fall of 1985. The move occurred just before Gordon transferred from middle school to high school. Both Carol and John were concerned about the crowd Gordon associated with in California, and Kimberly had suggested them to pull Jeff out of his school. The move to Pittsboro allowed Gordon to attend Tri-West Hendricks High School in nearby Lizton, Indiana. While Jeff was a student at Tri-West Hendricks High, he was taught driver's education by teacher Larry Sparks, who Gordon remembered as "one of my biggest fans" following Sparks' sudden death in a 2014 road accident at the age of 78.

Gordon's former home in Pittsboro, which is a brick ranch located just down County Road 100, is now owned by Michael and Sherry Lang. Before purchasing the house, Michael Lang was a racer and competed against Gordon. The Langs own Fluid Transfer Products, a company based out of the race shop previously used by John Bickford.

=== 1987–1991 ===
==== Racing in Australia and New Zealand ====
In November 1986, John and Carol launched a successful campaign urging for donations to allow Jeff to race in Australia. In February 1987, Gordon traveled to Perth, Western Australia, to compete in the inaugural World Sprint Car Championship at Claremont Speedway. The three-day event was held from February 5 to 7. The 15-year-old Gordon was the youngest driver and one of eleven Americans in the field. Garry Rush won the main event, while Gordon came in 12th.

In December 1988, Kiwi car owner John Rae of Taranaki invited Gordon to compete in a series of races in New Zealand. Rae watched Gordon race in Perth the previous year and followed his progress in the United States. Gordon participated in fifteen races during a two-week stretch, winning fourteen of them. He competed on tracks such as Western Springs.

==== Major national sanctioned racing ====
In July 1987, Gordon drove the No. 20 car for Bob Trostle at Knoxville Raceway. Also that summer, Gordon earned a three-race deal from car owner Gary Stanton, whose No. 40 machine scored a victory in the fourth annual King's Royal at Eldora Speedway with driver Jac Haudenschild. In this ride, Gordon competed in the Knoxville Nationals. This partnership did not last long but the two remained in touch.

Gordon became street legal when he earned his driver's license in Indiana. Now age sixteen, Gordon was eyeing to make a name for himself in races sanctioned by the United States Auto Club and the World of Outlaws. He became the youngest driver to earn a USAC license. Gordon made his USAC debut at Eldora on March 17, 1988, finishing 20th. He applied to join the speedway's Big "E" Club a month later.

Gordon spent most of the 1988 season driving the No. 6 for owner Terry Winterbotham. In their first race together, Gordon broke the track record and earned a victory in the main event. The season concluded with Gordon winning thirteen races and three track championships in Ohio.

On the night of May 13, 1989, shortly after graduating from Tri-West High, Gordon traveled to Bloomington to race, only changing his uniform after arriving at the speedway. On May 20, Gordon earned his first USAC victory in a sprint car at Florence Speedway in Union, Kentucky.

===== Thursday/Saturday Night Thunder, Night Before the 500 triumphs, and USAC championships =====
Gordon discovered midget car racing through Thursday Night Thunder, a television program that premiered on ESPN in 1988. At the time, he was primarily competing on dirt tracks in winged sprint car racing, which did not have a national television broadcast. Gordon and his stepfather began attending midget races in hopes that they could find somebody in the community who was willing to give them an opportunity in midget racing.

Gordon made his debut in a midget car at the running of the 1989 Night Before the 500 at Indianapolis Raceway Park on May 27, driving for businessman and car owner Rollie Helmling of Vincennes, Indiana. Earlier that month, Gordon had met Helmling briefly at the season opener held at Louisville Motor Speedway in Louisville, Kentucky. In the May 1 event at Louisville, Helmling's driver crashed in turn one after the checkered flag. With three weeks left before the 500 at IRP, Helmling had to search for a new car and driver. Helmling purchased the car from builder Bob East, who in turn recommended the 17-year-old Gordon for the ride. Gordon and Helmling had a nice exchange over the phone, and arranged a meeting at East's shop a couple days later. Though skeptical, Helmling decided to give Gordon the opportunity. Sixty one drivers attempted to qualify for the prestigious event. Gordon, primarily a dirt track sprint car racer, conquered the asphalt by putting his midget on the pole, setting a track record. Despite posting the fastest time, Gordon started 12th due to an inverting of the twelve fastest vehicles. Gordon quickly worked his way up and drove away to a surprise victory in the biggest race yet of his young career. The race, which was aired live on television, earned Gordon attention from a national audience. A year later, he earned his second consecutive victory in the 1990 Night Before the 500.

Following their win in the 1989 Night Before the 500, Gordon and Helmling agreed to a partnership that would see Jeff compete in more Thunder races. He continued to race locally for Terry Winterbotham until he earned an offer from Stan Shoff to compete in major events behind the wheel of the No. 23 McBride & Shoff Motorsports car. Gordon scored two victories in the All Star Circuit of Champions that year, including his first major feature at Sandusky Speedway. He qualified for the main event at the 1989 Knoxville Nationals, finishing 23rd. However, Gordon also tore up much of Shoff's equipment. After wrecking two cars in two nights at Peoria Speedway in Peoria, Illinois, Gordon was replaced with driver Frankie Kerr. Shoff's dismissal of Gordon marked the only time Jeff was ever fired by a team owner. Gordon ended 1989 on a high note, earning the USAC National Midget Series Rookie of the Year award at age eighteen. By the end of the decade, Gordon was one of the most popular drivers on the Thunder circuit. Under Helmling, Gordon secured sponsorships from RC Cola and later Diet Pepsi. This marked the first time Gordon participated in a promotional photo shoot.

He established a rivalry with fellow racer Rich Vogler, which was ended on July 21, 1990, when Vogler died from massive head injuries sustained in a crash on the final lap of a sprint car event at Salem Speedway. Vogler, who was leading Gordon at the time of the crash, was declared the race winner, as USAC rules stated that the leader of the last green-flag lap before a race-ending red flag be credited with the victory.

On August 4, 1990— his 19th birthday, Gordon earned a victory in the prestigious Belleville Midget Nationals. Hemling considered the win to be Gordon's "most dynamic" performance in a midget. By the end of 1990, Gordon had dominated in the USAC National Midget Series, as he captured nine wins en route to the series championship, the youngest driver to do so. Gordon won a combined 15 midget races for Helmling between the National and Western States Series. In 1991, Gordon drove the No. 4 car for California-based car owner Fred Ede in the USAC Silver Crown Series. He scored two victories at Phoenix International Raceway and Indiana Fairgrounds, which was enough to capture the series championship, the youngest driver to do so. Gordon was the runner-up in the 1991 Night Before the 500. He earned his final midget win in the 4-Crown Nationals at Eldora Speedway in September 1991.

=== Total ASCoC career achievements ===
Race wins

- 2 ASCoC victories

ASCoC victories
No.	Date	Season	Track	Location	Ref
1	August 2	1989	Sandusky Speedway	Sandusky, Ohio	
2	October 28	1989	Orange County Speedway	Rougemont, North Carolina	

=== Total USAC career achievements ===
Race wins

- 12 USAC National Midget victories

USAC National Midget victories
No.	Date	Season	Track	Location	Ref
1	May 27	1989	Indianapolis Raceway Park	Brownsburg, Indiana	
2	July 6	1989	Indianapolis Raceway Park	Brownsburg, Indiana	
3	May 26	1990	Indianapolis Raceway Park	Brownsburg, Indiana	
4	June 17	1990	Salem Speedway	Salem, Indiana	
5	July 3	1990	Tri-City Speedway	Granite City, Illinois	
6	July 14	1990	Angell Park Speedway	Sun Prairie, Wisconsin	
7	July 28	1990	Indianapolis Raceway Park	Brownsburg, Indiana	
8	July 31	1990	Eagle Raceway	Eagle, Nebraska	
9	September 1	1990	Tri-City Speedway	Granite City, Illinois	
10	September 15	1990	Terre Haute Action Track	Terre Haute, Indiana	
11	November 4	1990	Winchester Speedway	Winchester, Indiana	
12	September 22	1991	Eldora Speedway	Rossburg, Ohio	

- 5 USAC National Sprint Car victories

USAC National Sprint Car victories
No.	Date	Season	Track	Location	Ref
1	May 20	1989	Florence Speedway	Union, Kentucky	
2	May 19	1990	Winchester Speedway	Winchester, Indiana	
3	June 9	1990	Indianapolis Raceway Park	Brownsburg, Indiana	
4	June 17	1990	Salem Speedway	Salem, Indiana	
5	November 4	1990	Winchester Speedway	Winchester, Indiana	

- 3 USAC Western States Midget victories

USAC Western States Midget victories
No.	Date	Season	Track	Location	Ref
1	April 28	1990	Ascot Park	Gardena, California	
2	June 24	1990	Ascot Park	Gardena, California	
3	July 31	1990	Eagle Raceway	Eagle, Nebraska	

- 2 USAC Silver Crown victories

USAC Silver Crown victories
No.	Date	Season	Track	Location	Ref
1	February 3	1991	Phoenix International Raceway	Avondale, Arizona	
2	May 24	1991	Indiana State Fairgrounds	Indianapolis, Indiana	

Championships

- 1990 USAC National Midget Champion
- 1991 USAC Silver Crown Champion

== Stock car racing ==
At the beginning of the new decade, Gordon was thinking about the next chapter of his still-young racing career. He aspired a career in open-wheel racing, particularly with an American organization such as Championship Auto Racing Teams (CART). He considered Indy Lights and Formula Three, the latter of which Jackie Stewart attempted to help Gordon pursue with the possibility of moving up to Formula One. Neither offered Gordon assurance, however, and in the case of Formula racing, he felt the switch would force him to move to Europe and would need to learn multiple languages, commitments Gordon found unappealing at the time. He ultimately realized that the open-wheel industry was changing, as car owners began to prioritize foreign drivers who brought in big money and sponsorships, which resulted in young and unknown drivers with less money like Gordon being passed over.

Gordon had an opportunity from car owner Cal Wells to drive a Toyota truck for a Stadium Truck series. Gordon flew to California for a test session, in which the truck rolled over three times. The incident shattered Gordon's confidence to pursue a stadium truck career, and despite calls from Wells to continue to try out, this did not result in a mutual agreement for a permanent ride.

At this point in Gordon's life, stock car racing emerged as a realistic possibility. During a visit to the Grand Prix of Cleveland, where Jeff attempted to shop himself to Indy teams, he earned chance meetings with Al Unser Jr. and A. J. Foyt, who both recommended NASCAR to Gordon.

=== Buck Baker Racing School ===
"He came to my father's driving school. (After one) night, he called his mom, and said, 'Mom, I've made up my mind what I want to do with the rest of my life.' He wanted Winston Cup cars. As far as Indy racing goes, that was a kick in the pants for them. Because stars like him don't come along that often."

— Buddy Baker, recalling Gordon's visit to Buck Baker Racing School.

"I don't know if I'd be where I am if it wasn't for Buck and his racing school."

— Jeff Gordon.

As one of the biggest stars on ESPN's Thunder program, Gordon worked alongside auto racing announcer Larry Nuber, who also covered the NASCAR Winston Cup circuit at the time. Nuber saw the potential for Jeff to try out in stock cars, so he and John Bickford reached a deal with two-time Grand National Series champion Buck Baker to allow Gordon to run laps at his stock-car driving school, which operated at North Carolina Motor Speedway in Rockingham. As part of the agreement, Gordon would participate in the three-day program with an ESPN crew filming the session, giving Baker's school free publicity, in exchange for Baker waiving the $4,000 fee (worth $9,396 in 2023 dollars).

The driving program marked Gordon's first laps in a stock car and on a track with high banking. Aside from the cars having manual transmissions, Gordon's lone concern was that Baker would not let him go faster than he wanted. By the first day, Gordon was hooked, and at age nineteen, he knew he wanted to do stock car racing for a living. On the second day of the program, Baker introduced Gordon to Hugh Connerty, a property developer and a son-in-law of Cup team owner Leo Jackson. A wealthy businessman and aspiring racer himself, Connerty owned several Hooters, Longhorn Steakhouse, and Outback Steakhouse restaurants; and also owned the cars used at the driving school. Benny Parsons, a former Winston Cup Series champion and ESPN broadcaster, was aware of his network's intentions to film Gordon's session and knew Connerty was a regular at the track, so he called Jackson and made the suggestion that Connerty put Gordon behind the wheel of his car. Baker worked out a deal with Connerty to let Gordon run some laps in the car built for the NASCAR Busch Grand National Series. Gordon not only ran the best laps run that week, but he also bested every lap that Connerty himself ran in the car. Connerty then offered Gordon a limited-race deal to compete in the Busch Grand National Series late in the 1990 season. On the third and final day of the program, Gordon successfully convinced his mother to ride with him on the track for a few laps as one of the cars had a passenger seat installed; Jeff reached the car up to 150 miles per hour (240 km/h) with Carol riding along.

=== NASCAR Busch Grand National Series ===
==== 1990 ====
===== Formation of No. 67 team and introduction to Ray Evernham =====
"(Jeff) was trying to grow a mustache at the time and when he opened his briefcase, he had a video game and a racing magazine in it."

— Ray Evernham, recalling his first meeting with Gordon.

Connerty was able to put together a three-race deal for Gordon, with sponsorship from Outback Steakhouse. While putting the team together, Connerty and Jackson sought assistance from Andy Petree, who was the Winston Cup crew chief for Harry Gant at the time. As Petree himself was too busy to prepare the Busch Series car, he enlisted help from Phil Barkdoll and his son Steve to prepare the car for Gordon. Still in need of a crew chief for Gordon, Petree made a phone call to his friend Ray Evernham to offer him an opportunity to meet Jeff for a September test session at Charlotte Motor Speedway. Evernham arranged a visit with Jeff and Carol at a hotel in Hendersonville, North Carolina. Evernham was amused by Gordon's small height, as he thought Jeff looked about thirteen to fifteen years old; and for the briefcase the young driver brought with him, which contained a cell phone, Game Boy, stock-car magazine, gum and peanuts. Gordon instantly felt he and Evernham had chemistry. They celebrated the beginning of their partnership by going to Hooters. The following day, they rolled the No. 67 Outback Steakhouse Pontiac out for their first laps together at the Charlotte test session. An open-practice day, the test session included notable competitors such as Davey Allison and eventual Busch Grand National Series champion Chuck Bown. Gordon started off slow, so Evernham asked Bown if he could get into Jeff's car to see whether the car itself was slow or if it was the driver. Bown agreed to help and outran Gordon's initial laps, which proved the car was fast. When Gordon realized the car was capable of going faster than he expected, he went ahead and outran Bown's laps; Jeff ultimately continued to improve throughout the day and was second fastest overall, just behind Allison. As impressed as Evernham was with Gordon's laps, he was even more impressed by Jeff's feedback. Gordon felt that his partnership with Evernham reminded him of that of his stepfather. Gordon's stint in the Busch Grand National Series marked the first time in his fifteen years of racing he did not have any input or hands-on assistance from Bickford.

===== Three-race deal for Hugh Connerty =====
Gordon planned to make his debut in the All Pro 300 at Charlotte on October 6. Qualifying was rained out, and the starting positions were awarded based on drivers' points standings. Gordon still had a chance to qualify via a hooligan's race— a last chance event for drivers at the bottom of the points to make their way into the main event. Despite running well, Gordon was tapped by Randy Baker—Buck's son and ironically Gordon's instructor at Buck's driving school—and hit the wall. Therefore, Gordon did not qualify (DNQ) in his first attempt.

Gordon formally made his Busch Grand National start with the running of the AC-Delco 200 at Rockingham on October 20. He qualified second in a field of 40 drivers and started on the outside of the front row. In practice, Gordon wanted his crew to loosen the car so it would turn easier, but this move backfired once the green flag waved. Gordon was able to maintain a top-five run but after nearly 30 laps his tires wore out and he hit the wall. Gordon did not finish (DNF) the race and was credited with a 39th-place finish in his debut.

Gordon's final attempt of 1990 came in the season finale— the Winston Classic at Martinsville Speedway— on October 28. Gordon was third quickest in practice but rain washed out qualifying, just like it did at Charlotte, and as Gordon was not locked in on points he had to run a hooligan's race to make one last attempt into the main event. Ultimately a broken crankshaft resulted in his second DNQ in three attempts. Gordon ended the season 115th in the standings; the season featured 117 drivers who made at least one start.

===== Split with Connerty and introduction to Bill Davis =====
Connerty was unable to put a deal together for Gordon to race in the upcoming 1991 season, citing the Gulf War and an uncertain economic future. Gordon remained grateful for the partnership, which he remembered as an "opportunity of a lifetime" in his 2003 memoir Racing Back to the Front. The 1990 season also marked his introduction to Ray Evernham—a man who would later play a central role in Gordon's NASCAR career—but for now the two would part ways, as Evernham returned to his home in New Jersey. Gordon returned to Indiana and continued to race midgets and sprints during NASCAR's off-season.

Lee Morse, the head of Ford Motor Company's racing division, was aware of Gordon through his Thunder races and witnessed his second-place qualifying run at Rockingham. Morse agreed to meet with Gordon at the end of the season in Dearborn, Michigan, where they sat in Michael Kranefuss' office and watched a videotape Larry Nuber made highlighting Jeff's fifteen-year career in racing. Morse was impressed with the videotape, but had nothing to offer Jeff at the time. It was not much longer when Morse learned of a driver vacancy for the No. 1 Carolina Ford Dealers car owned by Bill Davis. Mark Martin, who drove the No. 1 for Davis, decided to leave the operation to run his own program. Morse made a call to Gordon to let him know about the opportunity, and he convinced Davis to arrange a meeting with Gordon.

On December 4, Gordon participated in a Goodyear tire test session for Davis at Rockingham, which featured Martin and one other driver; Gordon was the quickest out of the three. He also drove for Davis in a December 16 test session at Daytona International Speedway. In the December 9 edition of The Indianapolis Star, Curt Cavin reported that Gordon was prepared to sign a contract for Davis. Davis and his wife Gail flew to Indianapolis, where they met with Carol and John at the airport. They settled in at Frank & Mary's Tavern, a well-known catfish restaurant in Pittsboro, to discuss a Busch Grand National contract for Gordon. They agreed to an unconventional deal where Gordon would not make a salary, but rather he would receive half of the car's earnings. Gordon signed a one-year contract to drive for Davis in 1991—a deal which guaranteed at least fifteen races, enough to compete for NASCAR Rookie of the Year. Connerty formally signed Gordon over to Davis at an Outback Steakhouse restaurant in Jacksonville. Keith Simmons would serve as the crew chief under Gordon. At age nineteen, a full-time move to NASCAR meant Gordon had to relocate to North Carolina, giving him independence from Carol and John. He shared an apartment in North Charlotte with Andy Graves, who had a job in the chassis-building division at Hendrick Motorsports, a two-car team in the Winston Cup Series.

==== 1991 ====
===== First half: First top-10 finishes and pole =====
Gordon's 1991 campaign started off slow, as he was one of fifteen drivers not fast enough to qualify for the season opener— the Goody's 300 at Daytona— on February 16. This was Gordon's first racing experience at the superspeedway; apart from the December test session, he had only seen the track while traveling between Jacksonville and Tampa during All-Star Speedweeks. Gordon formally made his first start of the season in the Pontiac 200 at Richmond International Raceway on February 23; he crashed the car and finished 17th, four laps down. Gordon drove the No. 4 in a one-off ride for Richmond.

In March, Gordon began to show some speed with qualifying runs of fourth at Rockingham, fourth at Volusia County Speedway, and second at Hickory Motor Speedway. Gordon earned his first career top-10 with a ninth-place finish in the Pontiac 200 at Darlington Raceway on April 6. Three weeks later, he finished second behind fellow rookie contender David Green in the Nestle 200 at Lanier Raceway on April 27. Gordon scored a fifth-place finish in the Pontiac Pacesetters 200 at Pennsylvania International Raceway in Nazareth on May 11. Three weeks after that, he finished second behind Todd Bodine in the Budweiser 200 at Dover Downs International Speedway on June 1; after this race he was 10th in the standings, 404 points behind leader Bobby Labonte.

Gordon earned his first career pole—along with manufacturer Ford's first Busch pole since August 1987—for the running of the Roses Stores 300 at Orange County Speedway on June 8. Following the drop of the green flag, Gordon was quickly passed by Ward Burton, but he was able to retake the lead by lap 16 and remained out front for 75 laps; he went on to finish ninth. A week later, he qualified eighth and finished second behind Jimmy Hensley in the Granger Select 400 at Hickory on June 15.

===== Second half: Summer slump and ROTY win in an Oldsmobile =====
"The competition in this series is unreal— not just for the rookie award, but all the way around."

— Jeff Gordon, August 1991.

The summer solstice of 1991 occurred in the Northern Hemisphere on June 21. The following day, the second half of the Busch Grand National season began with the running of the Carolina Pride / Budweiser 250 at Myrtle Beach Speedway, where Gordon started eighth and finished 13th. By the end of the Fay's 150 at Watkins Glen International Raceway on June 29—in which Gordon finished sixth in his road course debut—with seventeen races complete in the 31-race season, Gordon had qualified for sixteen races (with one DNQ at Daytona); earned seven top-10s and four top-5s, including three runner-up finishes; and ranked 10th in the standings, now 352 points behind leader Bobby Labonte. However, Gordon would enter a summer slump, as in the next eight races he only registered one top-ten finish— a third in the August 23 Jay Johnson 250 at Bristol Motor Speedway; at this point the twenty-year-old driver was 11th in the standings, 500 points behind leader Kenny Wallace. Gordon put on a show in the September 14 SplitFire 200 at Dover, where he crashed on the final lap but backed the car in reverse to cross the line in eighth, the final spot on the lead lap.

Gordon participated in a test session for Cale Yarborough, the retired three-time Winston Cup Series champion, who also fielded his own Cup team. Midway through the 1991 Winston Cup Series season, Yarborough had fired drivers Dick Trickle and Lake Speed, so he reached out to Gordon to help him with his organization. It was Gordon's first experience driving a Winston Cup car, and Yarborough was so impressed that he offered Gordon to finish out the 1991 Cup season in the ride. Gordon turned down the offer, citing his commitment to Bill Davis, who was not thrilled when he found out his driver had tested for another team.

From October 5 to 19, Gordon suffered a late-season dry spell—two engine failures at Charlotte and New Hampshire International Speedway in Loudon—along with a race-ending crash at Rockingham. This doubled his DNF total to six, as he previously had three DNF's—engine failures at Bristol, IRP, and Darlington—in his first 26 starts of the season. Gordon literally had no momentum heading into the season finale at Martinsville, as he had destroyed the team's last remaining car in the wreck at Rockingham. For the second season in a row, Gordon earned some much-needed assistance from the eventual Busch Grand National Series champion—this time from Bobby Labonte—who drove Oldsmobiles for his family's team and decided to lend an extra Olds to Gordon, as he was a friend and neighbor of Davis. Lee Morse admitted the team's decision to use a rival General Motors car was ironic, but he believed the move was worth it in order for Ford to win Rookie of the Year with Gordon. In the October 27 Winston Classic, Gordon piloted the Penrose-sponsored Oldsmobile to an eighth-place finish, one lap down. Gordon clinched the rookie award over David Green, who finished 25th in the race, by only 12 points. Gordon was the youngest Rookie of the Year in series history. Gordon ended the season 11th in the standings, 107 points behind tenth-place driver Steve Grissom and 682 points behind series champion Labonte. In his 30 starts, Gordon recorded five top-5s, ten top-10s, one pole position, and led 94 laps.

During the off-season, Gordon, his roommate Andy Graves, and Graves' friend Bob Lutz put a down payment on a house in Withrow Downs, near Charlotte Motor Speedway.

==== 1992 ====
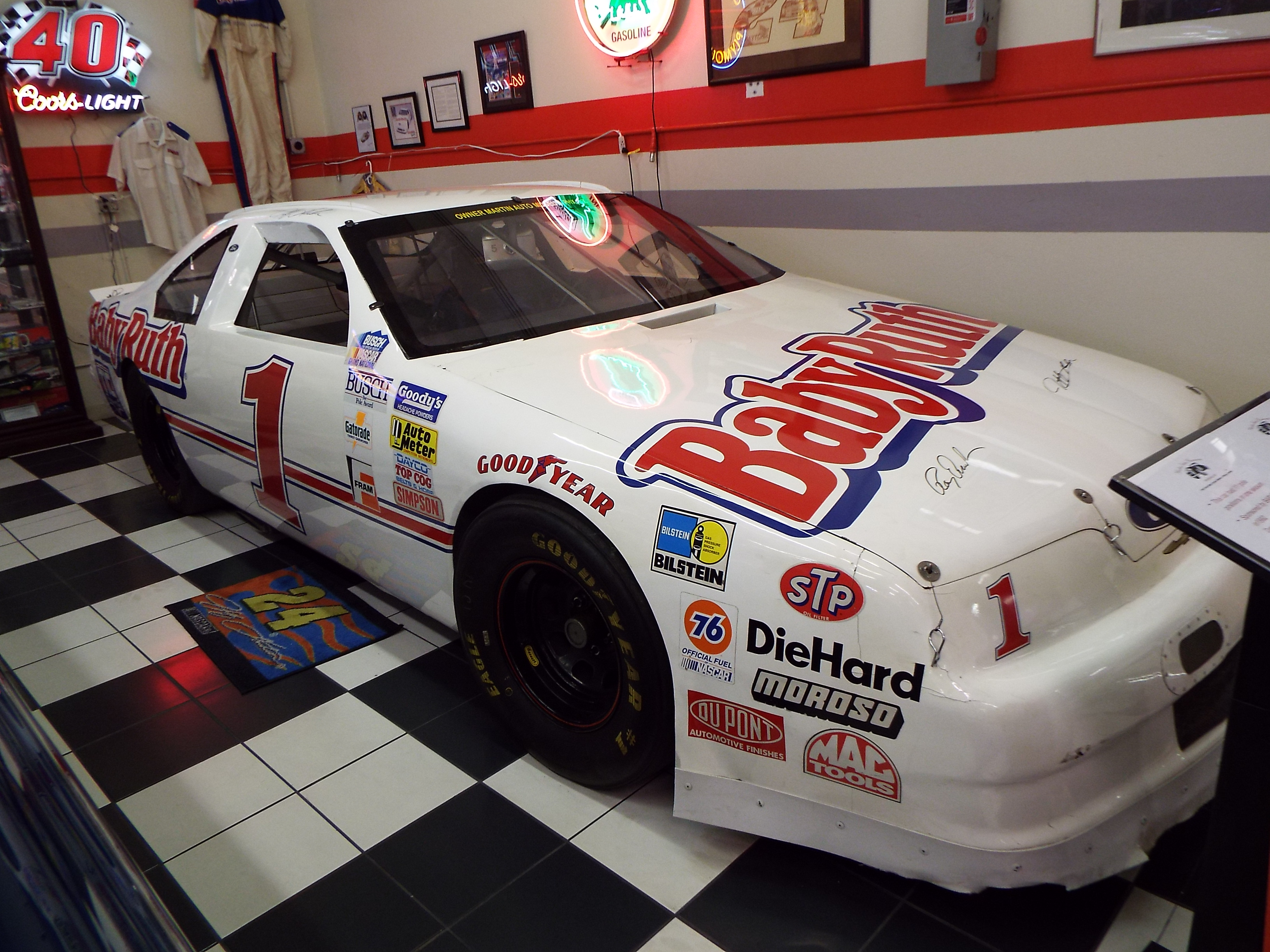
Gordon's No. 1 Baby Ruth Ford Thunderbird on display in the Martin Auto Museum

===== Contract extension with Davis and reunion with Evernham =====
Prior to the start of the 1992 season, Gordon negotiated a new Busch Grand National contract with Bill Davis, with assistance from his stepfather. According to Bickford, they were offered a "Roush contract"—in other words, it was written by Jack Roush but credited to Bill Davis. Bickford called the attorney Cary Agajanian, who previously helped Jeff earn partial emancipation as a teenage racer. Among the changes made was the inclusion of a clause to equally allow either Davis or Gordon to terminate their partnership at the end of the season. Davis agreed to the clause and opted to continue the deal which gave Gordon half of the car's earnings, rather than a salary. In addition to the new contract, on January 13, Gordon secured sponsorship from Baby Ruth.

During the week leading up to the 1992 Daytona 500, Gordon encountered his former crew chief Ray Evernham leaving the track. Evernham had been hired as the crew chief for Winston Cup driver Alan Kulwicki, but the two clashed and Evernham quit Kulwicki's team. When Gordon questioned Evernham and was told about the split, Jeff offered Ray to return as his own crew chief. Gordon knew he was in no position to offer Evernham the job, so he had to pitch him to Davis first. According to Bickford, Davis was not interested in bringing Evernham on, but he felt that if Ford could commit to covering half of Evernham's $50,000 salary (worth $109,417 in 2023 dollars), he would personally cover the other half. Lee Morse was sold on the deal, and felt the partnership would contribute to a successful season. With Evernham back as Gordon's crew chief, Keith Simmons was demoted to the engine builder.

===== First half: First victory and introduction to Rick Hendrick =====

"He came out of the turn with the back end hanging out. I told the guy with me that I wanted to wait a minute and see him bust his tail. But I stood there for 20 laps, and he just kept on going. He was on the ragged edge all day."

— Rick Hendrick, recalling watching Gordon race at Atlanta (layout pictured).

For the second season in a row, Gordon started off slow at Daytona as he was not fast enough to qualify for the season opener— the February 15 Goody's 300—on speed alone. This time, however, Gordon was able to get into the race via a "provisional" start; in Gordon's case, he was awarded a starting position for having a high points finish in the previous season. Gordon started the race last in the field of 44 drivers and finished 23rd after suffering an engine failure. He quickly found some speed and won the pole position for the next three consecutive races. After earning finishes of ninth and eighth at Rockingham and Richmond respectively, in his 35th career start, Gordon scored his first series victory in the inaugural running of the Atlanta 300 at Atlanta Motor Speedway on March 14. Gordon led 103 of the 197 laps en route to the win, which moved him up to second in the standings, only 13 points behind leader Kenny Wallace. Unbeknownst to Gordon at the time, his performance at Atlanta caught the attention of Rick Hendrick, the owner of a Chevrolet Winston Cup team, who normally did not attend Busch Grand National races but happened to be at the track a day early for a sponsorship appearance ahead of the 1992 Motorcraft Quality Parts 500 on Sunday. Hendrick, who fielded the No. 5 for Ricky Rudd and the No. 25 for Ken Schrader, was so impressed with Gordon that he contemplated funding a third Cup team for the young driver without having met him. On the following Monday, Hendrick discussed the possibility with general manager Jimmy Johnson at their shop. They were under the impression that Gordon had a multi-year deal with Davis and Ford, but Andy Graves, a crew member for Rudd and Gordon's housemate, informed them this was not the case. Then Graves approached Gordon and told him that Hendrick was interested in meeting him to discuss a potential ride. Gordon ignored Graves, believing it was a prank.

Focused on his Bill Davis Racing team, Gordon followed up his win at Atlanta with a sixth-place finish at Martinsville. A week later, an engine/suspension failure took him out of contention at Darlington. However, he rebounded at Bristol, as he earned an outside spot on the front row and brought the car to the finish in fifth place. Though he suffered another engine failure at Hickory, Gordon won the pole and finished 10th at Lanier. Meanwhile, Gordon continued to ignore requests from Graves to meet Hendrick. Desperate, Graves called Bickford to inform him about the situation, and after a discussion with Carol, John decided to call Hendrick himself. Gordon, who was waiting for Davis to put their own Cup deal together, agreed to speak with Hendrick. Gordon was impressed with the way Hendrick operated his businesses and felt confident they had a future in Winston Cup together despite having no sponsor, team, or car set up yet. Gordon was eager to pitch Evernham as the crew chief when Hendrick did not have one in mind. Amid rumors that Gordon may jump to a Chevrolet team, several folks at Ford attempted to convince Jeff to stay with them. Roush Racing, Junior Johnson & Associates, and Stavola Brothers Racing were among Ford's Winston Cup teams interested in Gordon, but neither of them were willing to consider Evernham as the crew chief. John Bickford even hung up the phone on Jack Roush when the car owner refused to consider Evernham.

He finished fifth in the Granger Select 200 at New River Valley Speedway on May 2. Three days later, on May 5, Gordon formally signed a contract to drive for Hendrick Motorsports in the Winston Cup Series, beginning in 1993. Coinciding with Gordon's private intentions to sign with Hendrick, Davis announced in the previous week that they may have a sponsor willing to go Cup racing with them. On May 6, one day after signing with Hendrick, Gordon boarded a plane with Davis and PR manager Bill Armour to Minneapolis to meet with Target Corporation executives. The meeting was arranged by Henry Rischitelli, Armour's friend and the head of motorsports for the International Management Group. Rischitelli worked with Target in Indy racing and the company was interested in expanding to NASCAR with Gordon as their driver. The Target camp was impressed with Gordon in the meeting, as was Davis, but neither of them were aware of Gordon's secret contract with Hendrick. While preparing to leave Minneapolis to return to Charlotte, Gordon informed Davis of his intentions to drive for Hendrick following the end of the season. Davis was so shocked that he left alone to return home, while Rischitelli returned to Cleveland. Gordon and Armour stayed overnight at an airport hotel before flying off to Pennsylvania for the upcoming race at Nazareth. In the Pontiac 200 on May 9, he suffered another engine failure. After the early exit, Gordon called Morse to inform him about his decision to leave Ford for Chevrolet. When the news became public, there was a massive uproar among those who believed Gordon had betrayed Ford. Michael Kranefuss questioned Gordon's motive and called him "an ungrateful punk". Some commentators, such as ESPN's Dave Despain and Terry Lingner, came to Gordon's defense.

Despite the early engine and mechanical issues, Gordon was consistently a top-ten contender in the first three months of the season. Now mid-May, Gordon, still shaken from the bad press over the Hendrick announcement, sought to return to victory lane. He would capture a series record $113,844 ($249,130 in 2023 dollars), fueled by a bonus worth $100,000 ($218,835 in 2023 dollars), with his second series victory from the pole position in the Champion 300 at Charlotte on May 23. He led 58 laps to take the checkered flag and was now third in the standings, 70 points behind leader Kenny Wallace and one point behind second-place driver Bobby Labonte. He thanked Davis for keeping him in the car this season despite the controversy over the switch to Hendrick for 1993. The tensions were high within the Ford camp, however, and according to Armour, Davis allegedly questioned to Kranefuss and Morse whether they would have a problem with firing Gordon in victory lane. On May 28, Evernham was formally signed on as Gordon's crew chief at Hendrick.

===== Second half: Pole record and split with Davis =====
The summer solstice of 1992 occurred in the Northern Hemisphere on June 20. This marked the second half of the Busch Grand National season, which began with the running of the Carolina Pride / Budweiser 250 at Myrtle Beach that same day; Gordon earned his sixth pole position of the season and finished 5th after leading 91 laps. By the end of the Fay's 150 at Watkins Glen on June 27—in which Gordon finished 19th after suffering a late race-ending crash—with sixteen races complete in the 31-race season, Gordon had no DNQs; earned ten top-10s and six top-5s, including two wins; and ranked fifth in the standings, now 150 points behind leader Kenny Wallace. By July, Evernham began working at the Hendrick shop to prepare for 1993.

Gordon would enter a summer slump for the second season in a row, as between June 27 and September 19, he only registered three top-10s in 12 starts; following the conclusion of the September 19 SplitFire 200 at Dover, Gordon was sixth in the standings, 278 points behind leader Todd Bodine. On the same day, DuPont announced a four-year deal to sponsor Gordon's Cup ride beginning in 1993. He continued to remain fast throughout the season, with additional pole positions at Volusia, Michigan International Speedway, Dover, Charlotte, and Rockingham. On October 10, Gordon earned his third and final series victory for Davis in the All Pro 300 at Charlotte, which marked the first racetrack sweep of his NASCAR career. In the season finale at Hickory— The Pantry 500 on November 8—Gordon competed in his final start for Davis, in which he started on the outside of the front row and finished 11th. Gordon ended the season fourth in the standings, 222 points behind series champion Joe Nemechek. In his 31 starts, Gordon recorded three wins, 10 top-5s, 15 top-10s, and 7 DNFs. He led the series with 1160 laps as the race leader and earned the most prize money with $371,578 ($813,144 in 2023 dollars). His 11 pole positions broke Sam Ard's record for the most poles in a single season; this record remains active today.

=== Aftermath ===
On November 15, one week after his final Busch race for Davis, Gordon began his Winston Cup Series career with Hendrick Motorsports, competing in the 1992 Hooters 500 at Atlanta behind the wheel of the No. 24 DuPont Chevrolet. He went on to compete full-time in the Cup Series between 1993 and 2015, making a record 797 consecutive starts.

Off the track, Gordon received media attention for his marriage to former Miss Winston model Brooke Sealey, which lasted from 1994 to 2003. He married Ingrid Vandebosch in 2006, and they have two children together. Gordon's relationship with his mother and stepfather became strained during his marriage to Brooke, but they made amends when the couple separated. Gordon also became a philanthropist. He began visiting children in hospitals while he drove for Davis in the Busch Grand National Series. In July 1992, Evernham's son Ray J was diagnosed with leukemia, which prompted Gordon to do more to make a difference to children. In 1999, he established his own foundation dedicated to childhood cancer.

Preceded by –	Life and career of Jeff Gordon; 1971–1992	Succeeded by 1992–2016
