= Cowtown =

Cowtown may refer to:

== Nicknames of places ==
=== United States ===
- Cattle towns, a generic name often associated with the American Old West
- Abilene, Kansas, from 1867 to 1871, the Chisholm Trail ended in Abilene
- Dodge City, Kansas, from 1883 to 1884, the Great Western Cattle Trail ended in Dodge City
- Columbus, Ohio
- Fort Worth, Texas
- Kansas City, Missouri
- Vacaville, California

=== Elsewhere ===
- Cowaramup, Western Australia, Australia
- Calgary, Alberta, Canada

== Other uses ==
- Cow Town, a 1950 American Western film
- Cowtown, a song from the album Lincoln by They Might Be Giants
- Cowtown Guitars, a vintage guitar shop in Las Vegas, Nevada
- Cow Town Showdown, skateboarding competition at the Arnold Sports Festival in Columbus, Ohio

== See also ==
- Cowtown Coliseum
- Cowtown Rodeo
- Cowtown Speedway
- Old Cowtown Museum
- The Hot Club of Cowtown
