= Potomac Speedway =

3/8 mile racetrack in Budds Creek, Maryland

Coordinates: 38°24′08″N 76°50′29″W

Potomac Speedway is a 3/8 mile clay oval raceway located in Budds Creek, Maryland, near Charlotte Hall. The raceway was first raced on in 1973. Races are typically held on Friday or Saturday nights. Regular events include Super Late Models, Limited Late Models, Street Stocks, and Hobby Stocks and 4 cylinders. The speedway also holds events for Modifieds, Crate Late Models, Strictly Stocks and Hornets. Potomac Speedway has a seating capacity of about 4,000 in the main grandstands and can hold an additional 1,000 in the pit area.

The speedway typically draws top drivers from Maryland, Virginia, Pennsylvania, Delaware and West Virginia. Greg Gunter is the current promoter of the track.

== See also ==
- Dirt track racing in the United States
