= Waverly School District 145 =

School system in Nebraska, United States

Location
- 14511 Heywood Street Waverly, Nebraska, 68462

District information
- NCES District ID: 3100021

Students and staff
- Students: 2,165 (2022–2023)
- Teachers: 145.95 (on an FTE basis) (2022–2023)
- Student–teacher ratio: 14.83:1 (2022–2023)

Other information
- Website: www.district145.org

Waverly School District 145 is a public school district serving the communities of Alvo, Eagle, Prairie Home, Walton, and Waverly in Nebraska, United States. The district provides primary and secondary education for over 2000 students in grades K-12. The district is governed by a six-member community-elected board, and the current superintendent is Cory Worrell.

== Attendance area ==
Within Lancaster County, the district includes Waverly, Prairie Home, and Walton, as well as small sections of Lincoln.

Within Cass County, it serves Alvo and Eagle.

Within Otoe County the district includes most of Woodland Hills.

The district extends into Saunders County.

== Schools ==
=== Elementary schools (K-5) ===
- Eagle Elementary School
- Hamlow Elementary School
- Waverly Intermediate School

=== Middle schools (6-8) ===
- Waverly Middle School

=== High schools (9-12) ===
- Waverly High School
