= Southern California Fair =

Annual event in Perris, California

- Dates: About 9 days in early October
- Locations: Perris, California, United States
- Years active: 1913–16; 1918–41; 1945–2019; 2021–, officially SoCal Fair since 1918
- Attendance: 122,500 in 2013
- Website: Southern California Fair

The Southern California Fair is an annual fair held at the Lake Perris Fairgrounds in Perris, California, United States. The event features amusement rides, food concessions, competitive exhibits, carnival games, motorized events, live performances and more. The fair started in 1913 as the Riverside County Fair and has been held at its current location since 1987.

The Perris Auto Speedway is a racetrack that opened in 1996.

The fair was not held in 1917, 1942–44, or in 2020.
