= Prairie Home, Nebraska =

Unincorporated community in Nebraska, U.S.

- Unincorporated community and Census designated place
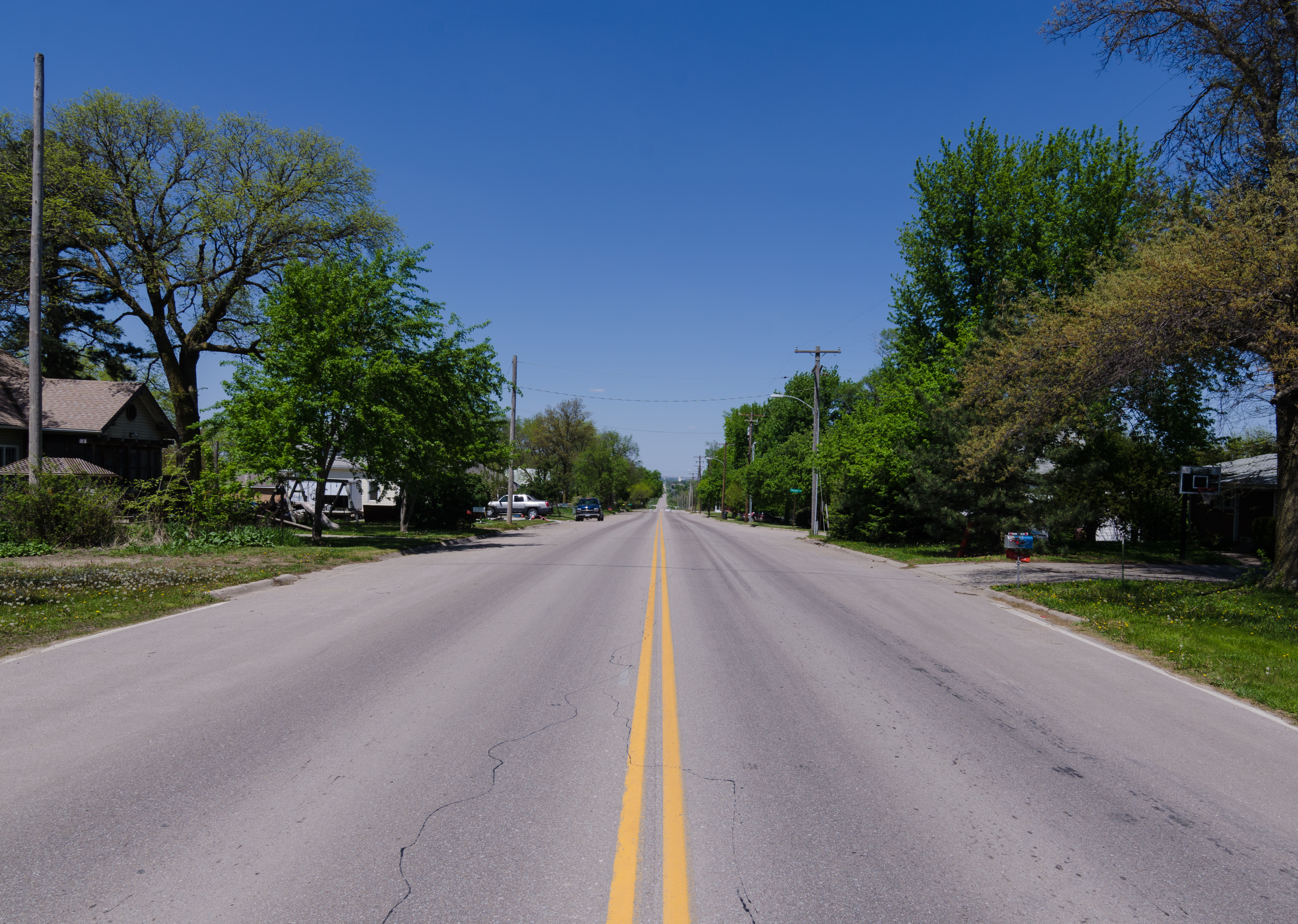
- 148th Street in Prairie Home

- Location in Nebraska Location in the United States
- Country: United States
- State: Nebraska
- County: Lancaster

Area
  - Total: 0.46 sq mi (1.18 km^{2})
  - Land: 0.46 sq mi (1.18 km^{2})
  - Water: 0 sq mi (0.00 km^{2})
- Elevation: 1,329 ft (405 m)

Population (2020)
  - Total: 38
  - Density: 83.1/sq mi (32.08/km^{2})
- Time zone: UTC-6 (Central (CST))
  - Summer (DST): UTC-5 (CDT)
- ZIP codes: 68527
- FIPS code: 31-40255
- GNIS feature ID: 2806915

Prairie Home is an unincorporated community and census-designated place (CDP) in Lancaster County, Nebraska, United States. The population was 38 at the 2020 census.

== History ==
In 1872, there was a post office at the location of the future town. In 1891, the village was platted by the Chicago, Rock Island, and Pacific Railroad. The town's name was derived from a farm located south of the village owned by a Mr. Waite called Prairie Home. The post office in the village stopped service in 1968.

== Education ==
It is in the Waverly School District 145.

== Demographics ==
Historical population
Census	Pop.	Note	%±
2020	38		—
U.S. Decennial Census
