= Alvo, Nebraska =

Village in Nebraska, US

- Village
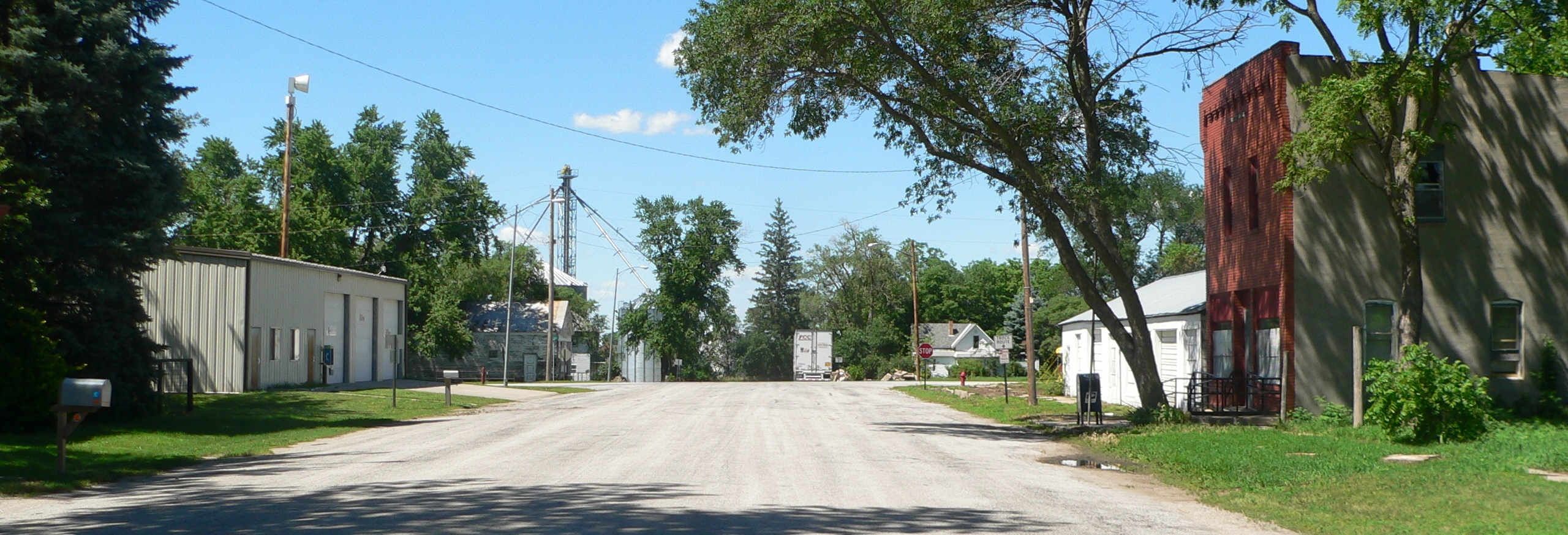
- Downtown Alvo

- Location of Alvo, Nebraska
- Coordinates: 40°52′20″N 96°23′11″W
- Country: United States
- State: Nebraska
- County: Cass

Area
  - Total: 0.10 sq mi (0.26 km^{2})
  - Land: 0.10 sq mi (0.26 km^{2})
  - Water: 0 sq mi (0.00 km^{2})
- Elevation: 1,339 ft (408 m)

Population (2020)
  - Total: 115
  - Density: 1,149.5/sq mi (443.84/km^{2})
- Time zone: UTC-6 (Central (CST))
  - Summer (DST): UTC-5 (CDT)
- ZIP code: 68304
- Area code: 402
- FIPS code: 31-01150
- GNIS feature ID: 2397951
- Website: http://www.AlvoNebraska.com

Alvo is a village in Cass County, Nebraska, United States. The population was 115 at the 2020 census.

== History ==
Alvo was established circa 1892 when the Chicago, Rock Island and Pacific Railroad was extended to that point. According to tradition, the community was named after Alvo, the first white child born in the new settlement, who reportedly was the daughter of a railroad official.

== Geography ==
Alvo is located at 40°52′20″N 96°23′8″W (40.872257, -96.385574).

According to the United States Census Bureau, the village has a total area of 0.10 square miles (0.26 km^{2}), all land.

== Demographics ==
Historical population
Census	Pop.	Note	%±
1920	208		—
1930	163		−21.6%
1940	215		31.9%
1950	190		−11.6%
1960	159		−16.3%
1970	151		−5.0%
1980	144		−4.6%
1990	164		13.9%
2000	142		−13.4%
2010	132		−7.0%
2020	115		−12.9%
U.S. Decennial Census

=== 2010 census ===
As of the census of 2010, there were 132 people, 52 households, and 37 families living in the village. The population density was 1,320.0 inhabitants per square mile (509.7/km^{2}). There were 60 housing units at an average density of 600.0 per square mile (231.7/km^{2}). The racial makeup of the village was 100.0% White.

There were 52 households, of which 42.3% had children under the age of 18 living with them, 51.9% were married couples living together, 11.5% had a female householder with no husband present, 7.7% had a male householder with no wife present, and 28.8% were non-families. 25.0% of all households were made up of individuals, and 5.7% had someone living alone who was 65 years of age or older. The average household size was 2.54 and the average family size was 3.00.

The median age in the village was 30.7 years. 29.5% of residents were under the age of 18; 6.1% were between the ages of 18 and 24; 28% were from 25 to 44; 26.5% were from 45 to 64; and 9.8% were 65 years of age or older. The gender makeup of the village was 49.2% male and 50.8% female.

=== 2000 census ===
As of the census of 2000, there were 142 people, 58 households, and 41 families living in the village. The population density was 1,418.7 inhabitants per square mile (547.8/km^{2}). There were 63 housing units at an average density of 629.4 per square mile (243.0/km^{2}). The racial makeup of the village was 97.89% White, and 2.11% from two or more races.

There were 58 households, out of which 32.8% had children under the age of 18 living with them, 63.8% were married couples living together, 5.2% had a female householder with no husband present, and 27.6% were non-families. 25.9% of all households were made up of individuals, and 15.5% had someone living alone who was 65 years of age or older. The average household size was 2.45 and the average family size was 2.90.

In the village, the population was spread out, with 24.6% under the age of 18, 4.2% from 18 to 24, 34.5% from 25 to 44, 22.5% from 45 to 64, and 14.1% who were 65 years of age or older. The median age was 38 years. For every 100 females, there were 105.8 males. For every 100 females age 18 and over, there were 94.5 males.

As of 2000 the median income for a household in the village was $36,250, and the median income for a family was $50,208. Males had a median income of $38,750 versus $22,188 for females. The per capita income for the village was $15,069. There were 16.3% of families and 16.8% of the population living below the poverty line, including 23.5% of under eighteens and 13.6% of those over 64.

== Education ==
It is in the Waverly School District 145.
