= Big O Speedway =

Motoracing circuit in Texas

- Location: Ellis County
- Coordinates: 32°18′32.8799″N 96°30′48.59″W
- Owner: Roger Archer
- Address: 3118 FM 85; Ennis, Texas 75119
- Opened: 1985
- Website: bigospeedway.com

Oval
- Surface: Clay
- Length: 0.25 miles (0.40 km)
- Turns: 4
- Banking: Semi-banked

Big O Speedway (formerly 85 Speedway) is a 1/4 mile, semi-banked, clay oval dirt track located east of Ennis, Texas.
