= North Alabama Speedway =

Sports venue in Tuscumbia, Alabama

Coordinates: 34°42′17″N 87°42′33″W

North Alabama Speedway located just outside Tuscumbia, Alabama, USA is a 3/8 mile high banked clay oval. North Alabama Speedway opened in 1977, operating through 1987. It reopened in 1990, operating through 1993, and reopened again in 1995. In 2007 it is hosting events for World of Outlaws Late Model Series and Lucas Oil Late Model Dirt Series.
