= 1992 Motorcraft Quality Parts 500 =

Fourth race of the 1992 NASCAR Winston Cup Series

Race details
- Race 4 of 29 in the 1992 NASCAR Winston Cup Series
- The 1992 Motorcraft Quality Parts 500 program cover, featuring Geoff Bodine.
- Date: March 15, 1992
- Official name: 33rd Annual Motorcraft Quality Parts 500
- Location: Hampton, Georgia, Atlanta Motor Speedway
- Course: Permanent racing facility
- Course length: 1.522 miles (2.449 km)
- Distance: 328 laps, 499.216 mi (803.41 km)
- Scheduled distance: 328 laps, 499.216 mi (803.41 km)
- Average speed: 147.746 miles per hour (237.774 km/h)

Pole position
Driver	Mark Martin	Roush Racing
- Time: 30.453

Most laps led
Driver	Davey Allison	Robert Yates Racing
- Laps: 160

Winner
No. 11	Bill Elliott	Junior Johnson & Associates

Television in the United States
- Network: ABC
- Announcers: Paul Page, Benny Parsons, Bobby Unser

Radio in the United States
- Radio: Motor Racing Network

The 1992 Motorcraft Quality Parts 500 was the fourth stock car race of the 1992 NASCAR Winston Cup Series season and the 33rd iteration of the event. The race was held on Sunday, March 15, 1992, in Hampton, Georgia at Atlanta Motor Speedway, a 1.522 miles (2.449 km) permanent asphalt quad-oval intermediate speedway. The race took the scheduled 328 laps to complete. With the help of a late caution, Junior Johnson & Associates driver Bill Elliott would manage to pull away on the final restart with 40 to go to take his 37th career NASCAR Winston Cup Series victory, his third victory of the season, and his third consecutive victory. To fill out the top three, Leo Jackson Motorsports driver Harry Gant and Richard Childress Racing driver Dale Earnhardt would finish second and third, respectively.

== Background ==
The layout of Atlanta Motor Speedway, the circuit where the race was held.

Atlanta Motor Speedway (formerly Atlanta International Raceway) is a 1.522-mile race track in Hampton, Georgia, United States, 20 miles (32 km) south of Atlanta. It has annually hosted NASCAR Winston Cup Series stock car races since its inauguration in 1960.

The venue was bought by Speedway Motorsports in 1990. In 1994, 46 condominiums were built over the northeastern side of the track. In 1997, to standardize the track with Speedway Motorsports' other two intermediate ovals, the entire track was almost completely rebuilt. The frontstretch and backstretch were swapped, and the configuration of the track was changed from oval to quad-oval, with a new official length of 1.54-mile (2.48 km) where before it was 1.522-mile (2.449 km). The project made the track one of the fastest on the NASCAR circuit.

=== Entry list ===
- (R) - denotes rookie driver.

#	Driver	Team	Make
1	Rick Mast	Precision Products Racing	Oldsmobile
2	Rusty Wallace	Penske Racing South	Pontiac
3	Dale Earnhardt	Richard Childress Racing	Chevrolet
4	Ernie Irvan	Morgan–McClure Motorsports	Chevrolet
5	Ricky Rudd	Hendrick Motorsports	Chevrolet
6	Mark Martin	Roush Racing	Ford
7	Alan Kulwicki	AK Racing	Ford
8	Dick Trickle	Stavola Brothers Racing	Ford
9	Dorsey Schroeder	Melling Racing	Ford
10	Derrike Cope	Whitcomb Racing	Chevrolet
11	Bill Elliott	Junior Johnson & Associates	Ford
12	Hut Stricklin	Bobby Allison Motorsports	Chevrolet
13	Dave Mader III	Folsom Racing	Chevrolet
15	Geoff Bodine	Bud Moore Engineering	Ford
16	Wally Dallenbach Jr.	Roush Racing	Ford
17	Darrell Waltrip	Darrell Waltrip Motorsports	Chevrolet
18	Dale Jarrett	Joe Gibbs Racing	Chevrolet
20	Mike Wallace	Moroso Racing	Oldsmobile
21	Morgan Shepherd	Wood Brothers Racing	Ford
22	Sterling Marlin	Junior Johnson & Associates	Ford
23	Eddie Bierschwale	B&B Racing	Oldsmobile
25	Ken Schrader	Hendrick Motorsports	Chevrolet
26	Brett Bodine	King Racing	Ford
28	Davey Allison	Robert Yates Racing	Ford
30	Michael Waltrip	Bahari Racing	Pontiac
31	Bobby Hillin Jr.	Team Ireland	Chevrolet
32	Jimmy Horton	Active Motorsports	Chevrolet
33	Harry Gant	Leo Jackson Motorsports	Oldsmobile
41	Greg Sacks	Larry Hedrick Motorsports	Chevrolet
42	Kyle Petty	SABCO Racing	Pontiac
43	Richard Petty	Petty Enterprises	Pontiac
47	Buddy Baker	Close Racing	Oldsmobile
49	Stanley Smith	BS&S Motorsports	Chevrolet
50	Clay Young	Clay Young Racing	Pontiac
52	Jimmy Means	Jimmy Means Racing	Pontiac
55	Ted Musgrave	RaDiUs Motorsports	Oldsmobile
66	Chad Little	Cale Yarborough Motorsports	Ford
68	Bobby Hamilton	TriStar Motorsports	Oldsmobile
71	Dave Marcis	Marcis Auto Racing	Chevrolet
77	Mike Potter	Balough Racing	Chevrolet
83	Lake Speed	Speed Racing	Chevrolet
85	Mike Skinner	Mansion Motorsports	Chevrolet
90	Charlie Glotzbach	Donlavey Racing	Ford
94	Terry Labonte	Hagan Racing	Oldsmobile
95	Bob Schacht (R)	Sadler Brothers Racing	Oldsmobile
98	Jimmy Spencer	Travis Carter Enterprises	Chevrolet

== Qualifying ==
Qualifying was split into two rounds. The first round was held on Friday, March 13, at 2:30 PM EST. Each driver would have one lap to set a time. During the first round, the top 20 drivers in the round would be guaranteed a starting spot in the race. If a driver was not able to guarantee a spot in the first round, they had the option to scrub their time from the first round and try and run a faster lap time in a second round qualifying run, held on Saturday, March 14, at 10:30 AM EST. As with the first round, each driver would have one lap to set a time. For this specific race, positions 21-40 would be decided on time, and depending on who needed it, a select amount of positions were given to cars who had not otherwise qualified but were high enough in owner's points; which was usually two. If needed, a past champion who did not qualify on either time or provisionals could use a champion's provisional, adding one more spot to the field.

Mark Martin, driving for Roush Racing, won the pole, setting a time of 30.453 and an average speed of 179.923 mph (289.558 km/h) in the first round.

Four drivers would fail to qualify.

=== Full qualifying results ===
Pos.	#	Driver	Team	Make	Time	Speed
1	6	Mark Martin	Roush Racing	Ford	30.453	179.923
2	8	Dick Trickle	Stavola Brothers Racing	Ford	30.497	179.664
3	94	Terry Labonte	Hagan Racing	Oldsmobile	30.609	179.006
4	11	Bill Elliott	Junior Johnson & Associates	Ford	30.619	178.948
5	25	Ken Schrader	Hendrick Motorsports	Chevrolet	30.664	178.685
6	22	Sterling Marlin	Junior Johnson & Associates	Ford	30.744	178.220
7	3	Dale Earnhardt	Richard Childress Racing	Chevrolet	30.759	178.133
8	7	Alan Kulwicki	AK Racing	Ford	30.761	178.122
9	26	Brett Bodine	King Racing	Ford	30.803	177.879
10	33	Harry Gant	Leo Jackson Motorsports	Oldsmobile	30.822	177.769
11	1	Rick Mast	Precision Products Racing	Oldsmobile	30.904	177.297
12	2	Rusty Wallace	Penske Racing South	Pontiac	30.969	176.925
13	17	Darrell Waltrip	Darrell Waltrip Motorsports	Chevrolet	30.987	176.823
14	21	Morgan Shepherd	Wood Brothers Racing	Ford	30.994	176.783
15	42	Kyle Petty	SABCO Racing	Pontiac	31.092	176.225
16	55	Ted Musgrave	RaDiUs Motorsports	Chevrolet	31.140	175.954
17	18	Dale Jarrett	Joe Gibbs Racing	Chevrolet	31.149	175.903
18	41	Greg Sacks	Larry Hedrick Motorsports	Chevrolet	31.189	175.677
19	68	Bobby Hamilton	TriStar Motorsports	Oldsmobile	31.222	175.492
20	98	Jimmy Spencer	Travis Carter Enterprises	Chevrolet	31.247	175.351
Failed to lock in Round 1
21	30	Michael Waltrip	Bahari Racing	Pontiac	30.852	177.596
22	4	Ernie Irvan	Morgan–McClure Motorsports	Chevrolet	30.894	177.355
23	15	Geoff Bodine	Bud Moore Engineering	Ford	30.970	176.920
24	5	Ricky Rudd	Hendrick Motorsports	Chevrolet	31.266	175.245
25	28	Davey Allison	Robert Yates Racing	Ford	31.270	175.222
26	12	Hut Stricklin	Bobby Allison Motorsports	Chevrolet	31.279	175.172
27	16	Wally Dallenbach Jr.	Roush Racing	Ford	31.309	175.004
28	10	Derrike Cope	Whitcomb Racing	Chevrolet	31.331	174.881
29	66	Chad Little	Cale Yarborough Motorsports	Ford	31.338	174.842
30	90	Charlie Glotzbach	Donlavey Racing	Ford	31.391	174.547
31	71	Dave Marcis	Marcis Auto Racing	Chevrolet	31.392	174.541
32	43	Richard Petty	Petty Enterprises	Pontiac	31.462	174.153
33	13	Bob Schacht (R)	Folsom Racing	Chevrolet	31.523	173.816
34	49	Stanley Smith	BS&S Motorsports	Chevrolet	31.551	173.662
35	20	Mike Wallace	Moroso Racing	Oldsmobile	31.555	173.640
36	31	Bobby Hillin Jr.	Team Ireland	Chevrolet	31.562	173.601
37	47	Buddy Baker	Close Racing	Oldsmobile	31.634	173.206
38	32	Jimmy Horton	Active Motorsports	Chevrolet	31.662	173.053
39	83	Lake Speed	Speed Racing	Chevrolet	31.672	172.998
40	23	Eddie Bierschwale	B&B Racing	Oldsmobile	31.715	172.764
Provisionals
41	9	Dorsey Schroeder	Melling Racing	Ford	32.227	170.019
42	52	Jimmy Means	Jimmy Means Racing	Pontiac	31.813	172.231
Failed to qualify
43	95	Bob Schacht (R)	Sadler Brothers Racing	Oldsmobile	31.721	172.731
44	85	Mike Skinner	Mansion Motorsports	Chevrolet	31.814	172.226
45	77	Mike Potter	Balough Racing	Chevrolet	32.527	168.451
46	50	Clay Young	Clay Young Racing	Pontiac	32.293	169.671
Official first round qualifying results
Official starting lineup

== Race results ==
Fin	St	#	Driver	Team	Make	Laps	Led	Status	Pts	Winnings
1	4	11	Bill Elliott	Junior Johnson & Associates	Ford	328	46	running	180	$71,000
2	10	33	Harry Gant	Leo Jackson Motorsports	Oldsmobile	328	43	running	175	$45,875
3	7	3	Dale Earnhardt	Richard Childress Racing	Chevrolet	328	0	running	165	$36,850
4	25	28	Davey Allison	Robert Yates Racing	Ford	328	160	running	170	$32,550
5	2	8	Dick Trickle	Stavola Brothers Racing	Ford	328	0	running	155	$28,125
6	23	15	Geoff Bodine	Bud Moore Engineering	Ford	328	0	running	150	$18,600
7	8	7	Alan Kulwicki	AK Racing	Ford	328	53	running	151	$20,850
8	15	42	Kyle Petty	SABCO Racing	Pontiac	328	0	running	142	$15,650
9	3	94	Terry Labonte	Hagan Racing	Oldsmobile	328	23	running	143	$17,150
10	14	21	Morgan Shepherd	Wood Brothers Racing	Ford	328	0	running	134	$16,000
11	17	18	Dale Jarrett	Joe Gibbs Racing	Chevrolet	328	0	running	130	$7,670
12	24	5	Ricky Rudd	Hendrick Motorsports	Chevrolet	328	0	running	127	$15,425
13	1	6	Mark Martin	Roush Racing	Ford	328	0	running	124	$19,230
14	28	10	Derrike Cope	Whitcomb Racing	Chevrolet	328	0	running	121	$9,810
15	12	2	Rusty Wallace	Penske Racing South	Pontiac	327	0	running	118	$14,980
16	32	43	Richard Petty	Petty Enterprises	Pontiac	327	0	running	115	$12,470
17	6	22	Sterling Marlin	Junior Johnson & Associates	Ford	327	0	running	112	$15,660
18	30	90	Charlie Glotzbach	Donlavey Racing	Ford	326	0	running	109	$6,600
19	16	55	Ted Musgrave	RaDiUs Motorsports	Chevrolet	326	0	running	106	$13,990
20	9	26	Brett Bodine	King Racing	Ford	325	0	running	103	$11,920
21	36	31	Bobby Hillin Jr.	Team Ireland	Chevrolet	323	0	running	100	$6,260
22	11	1	Rick Mast	Precision Products Racing	Oldsmobile	323	0	running	97	$13,050
23	29	66	Chad Little	Cale Yarborough Motorsports	Ford	322	0	running	94	$9,590
24	19	68	Bobby Hamilton	TriStar Motorsports	Oldsmobile	321	0	running	91	$13,130
25	22	4	Ernie Irvan	Morgan–McClure Motorsports	Chevrolet	317	0	running	88	$16,725
26	38	32	Jimmy Horton	Active Motorsports	Chevrolet	316	0	running	85	$6,820
27	27	16	Wally Dallenbach Jr.	Roush Racing	Ford	316	0	running	82	$6,460
28	21	30	Michael Waltrip	Bahari Racing	Pontiac	298	0	engine	79	$12,740
29	26	12	Hut Stricklin	Bobby Allison Motorsports	Chevrolet	281	0	engine	76	$10,100
30	31	71	Dave Marcis	Marcis Auto Racing	Chevrolet	277	0	running	73	$8,940
31	18	41	Greg Sacks	Larry Hedrick Motorsports	Chevrolet	268	0	running	70	$5,330
32	34	49	Stanley Smith	BS&S Motorsports	Chevrolet	261	0	oil leak	67	$5,270
33	35	20	Mike Wallace	Moroso Racing	Oldsmobile	251	0	running	64	$5,180
34	39	83	Lake Speed	Speed Racing	Chevrolet	218	0	crash	61	$5,135
35	41	9	Dorsey Schroeder	Melling Racing	Ford	176	0	timing chain	58	$10,385
36	37	47	Buddy Baker	Close Racing	Oldsmobile	172	0	engine	55	$5,070
37	20	98	Jimmy Spencer	Travis Carter Enterprises	Chevrolet	91	0	engine	52	$9,555
38	42	52	Jimmy Means	Jimmy Means Racing	Pontiac	87	0	engine	49	$5,040
39	13	17	Darrell Waltrip	Darrell Waltrip Motorsports	Chevrolet	79	3	oil pressure	51	$15,715
40	40	23	Eddie Bierschwale	B&B Racing	Oldsmobile	71	0	valve	43	$4,975
41	5	25	Ken Schrader	Hendrick Motorsports	Chevrolet	38	0	crash	40	$13,975
42	33	13	Bob Schacht (R)	Folsom Racing	Chevrolet	23	0	valve	37	$5,225
Official race results

== Standings after the race ==
Drivers' Championship standings

	Pos	Driver	Points
	1	Davey Allison	695
1	2	Bill Elliott	637 (-58)
1	3	Harry Gant	637 (-58)
1	4	Terry Labonte	577 (–118)
1	5	Morgan Shepherd	572 (–123)
1	6	Alan Kulwicki	551 (–144)
1	7	Geoff Bodine	551 (–144)
3	8	Dale Earnhardt	524 (–171)
5	9	Kyle Petty	476 (–219)
10	10	Dick Trickle	462 (–233)
Official driver's standings

- Note: Only the first 10 positions are included for the driver standings.

Previous race: 1992 Pontiac Excitement 400	NASCAR Winston Cup Series; 1992 season	Next race: 1992 TranSouth 500
