= Dirt track racing in the United States =

Type of motorsport in the US

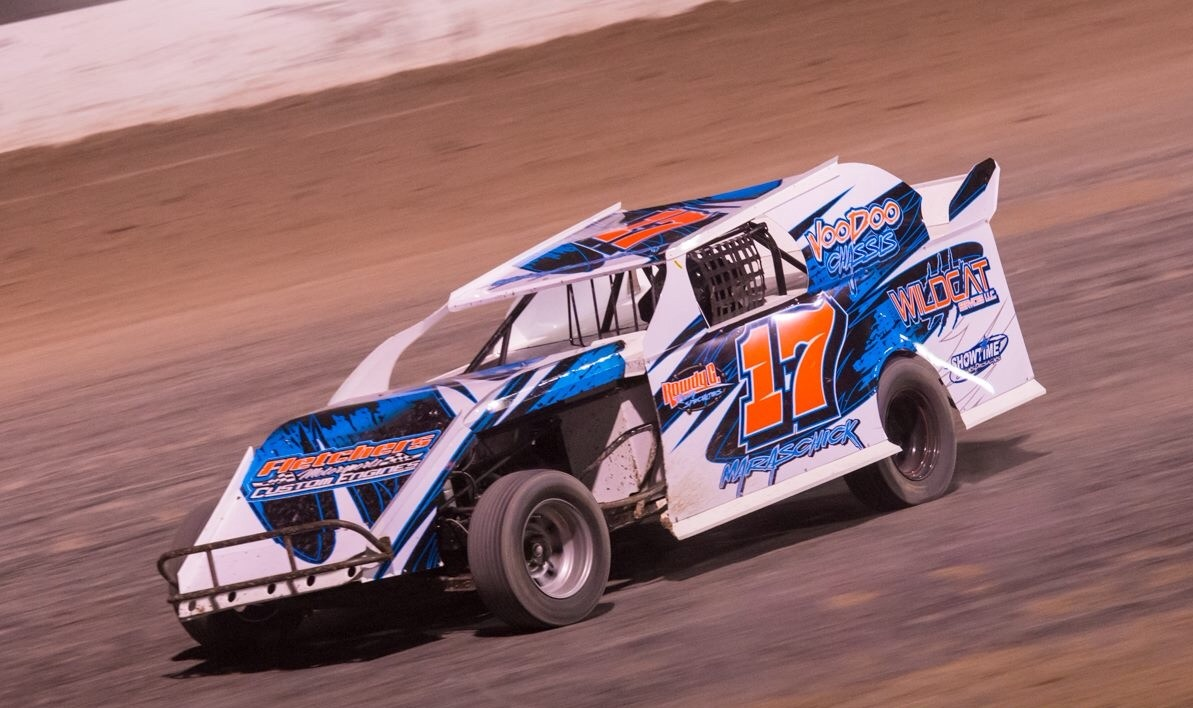
This is an image of a Southern SportMod car sliding through a turn on a dirt track

Dirt track racing is the single most common form of auto racing in the United States. According to the National Speedway Directory there are over 700 dirt oval tracks in operation in the United States. The composition of the dirt on tracks has an effect on the amount of grip available. On many tracks people will find clay is used with a specific mixture of dirt. Tracks are sometimes banked in the turns and on the straights. This banking is utilized primarily to allow vehicles to carry more speed through the corners. However, some tracks prefer less banked turns. Each track surface will most often be different in one way or another. These tracks are commonly around 1/2 mile in distance, and races consist of only left turns.

The Wall Street Journal noted that the success of local dirt track racing is a good economic indicator. Small businesses sponsor local grass-roots racing as part of their marketing budget. Many of the fans in the grandstands attend to support relatives and they consider the costs of attending the races to be modest.

== History ==
In the beginning of dirt track racing small numbers of cars would gather at a horse racing oval. The first dirt race was held in 1876 in Cranston, Rhode Island and was made up of 8 vehicles, most who were gasoline powered, however the victor was a man named Whiting who had an electric powered vehicle. After the initial races dirt track racing stayed in the background until the 1920s and 1930s, which is when the sport became much more popular. The International Motor Contest Association, or IMCA, is the most common sanctioning body in the dirt track industry and has been operating since 1915. The IMCA brought to light the competition and variety that dirt track racing has to offer. The IMCA continues to sanction more car classes and provides a safe and competitive environment for the racing community.

== Car classes ==
IMCA car classes include: Modified, Stock Car, Hobby Stock, Northern SportMod, Southern SportMod, Sport Compact, Late Model and Sprint. New classes are added every so often and each class has specific rules and regulations regarding the build of the body and engine. The rules for each car are extensive and are best found on the IMCA website.

== Rules ==
The rules for how IMCA events are conducted are generally as follows:

Rules for racing in an IMCA sanctioned event include, but are not limited to: No participant in an IMCA sanctioned event may not enter into the event until all release forms and waivers are completed and signed, No driver or crew member may consume alcohol or illegal substances before or during and IMCA sanctioned event and any driver/crew member found to have consumed alcohol or an illegal substance will be removed from the property and may be subject to a fine of $250 or more and, no fighting is allowed while in participation of an IMCA sanctioned event. These rules are designed to create a safe environment on and around the racetrack.

Each class of car has specific guidelines to follow regarding the build of the car in order to be considered part of a specific class and eligible to participate in the competition, these rules are posted on the IMCA website.

== See also ==
- Dirt track racing
- List of dirt track ovals in the United States
