= Perris Auto Speedway =

Oval track in Perris, California

Coordinates: 33°50′56″N 117°12′08″W

- Location: Perris, California
- Opened: March 30, 1996

oval
- Surface: clay
- Length: 0.50 mi (0.80 km)
- Turns: 4

Perris Auto Speedway, also known as the PAS, is a 1/2 mile clay oval track located at 18700 Lake Perris Drive on the Lake Perris Fairgrounds in Perris, California. The track features a raised backstretch offering fans a better view over the infield of the oval. The track hosts USAC/CRA sprint cars, street stocks, dirt modifieds, and many others. It hosted the Turkey Night Grand Prix midget car race in 1996, 2012 and 2013. The track has also hosted the World of Outlaws and the Traxxas TORC Series.

The track opened on March 30, 1996. Prior to that, the site of the track was home to Lake Perris speedway, a 1/8-mile dirt oval constructed in 1987 and hosted motorcycle racing then later car racing until 1993. A 1/3-mile dirt oval operated until the end of 1995.
