= Eagle, Nebraska =

Village in Nebraska, US

- Village
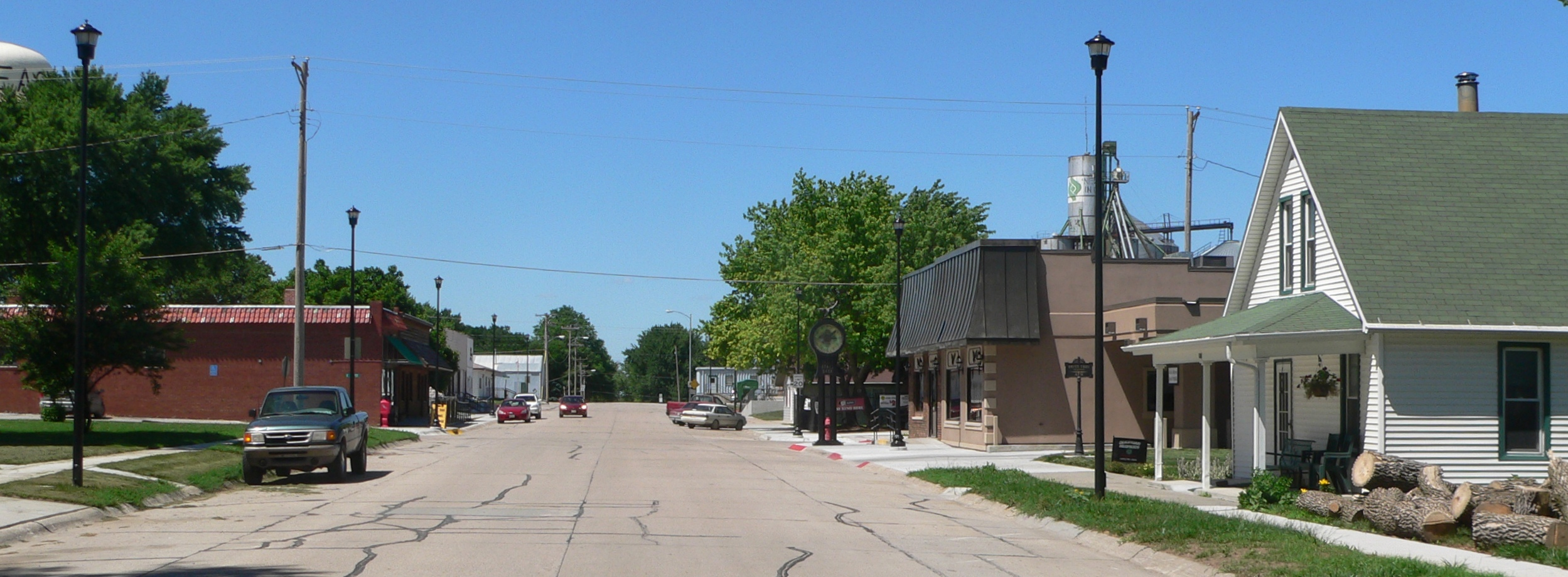
- Downtown Eagle: Fourth Street

- Location of Eagle, Nebraska
- Coordinates: 40°48′56″N 96°25′57″W
- Country: United States
- State: Nebraska
- County: Cass

Area
  - Total: 0.41 sq mi (1.07 km^{2})
  - Land: 0.41 sq mi (1.07 km^{2})
  - Water: 0 sq mi (0.00 km^{2})
- Elevation: 1,342 ft (409 m)

Population (2020)
  - Total: 1,065
  - Density: 2,582.7/sq mi (997.19/km^{2})
- Time zone: UTC-6 (Central (CST))
  - Summer (DST): UTC-5 (CDT)
- ZIP code: 68347
- Area code: 402
- FIPS code: 31-14100
- GNIS feature ID: 2398768
- Website: https://EagleNebraska.com

Eagle is a village in southwest Cass County, Nebraska, United States. As of the 2020 census, the village population was 1,065.

== History ==
Eagle was platted in 1886 when the Missouri Pacific Railroad was extended to that point. An early variant name was "Sunlight". The present name is likely for the wild eagles observed by the first settlers.

== Geography ==
According to the United States Census Bureau, the village has a total area of 0.35 square miles (0.91 km^{2}), all land.

== Demographics ==
Historical population
Census	Pop.	Note	%±
1900	297		—
1910	360		21.2%
1920	368		2.2%
1930	309		−16.0%
1940	289		−6.5%
1950	255		−11.8%
1960	302		18.4%
1970	441		46.0%
1980	832		88.7%
1990	1,047		25.8%
2000	1,105		5.5%
2010	1,024		−7.3%
2020	1,065		4.0%
U.S. Decennial Census

=== 2010 census ===
As of the census of 2010, there were 1,024 people, 384 households, and 295 families living in the village. The population density was 2,925.7 inhabitants per square mile (1,129.6/km^{2}). There were 418 housing units at an average density of 1,194.3 units per square mile (461.1 units/km^{2}). The racial makeup of the village was 98.2% White, 0.2% African American, 0.1% Native American, 0.3% Asian, 0.1% from other races, and 1.1% from two or more races. Hispanic or Latino of any race were 1.9% of the population.

There were 384 households, of which 44.0% had children under the age of 18 living in them, 60.7% were married couples living together, 9.6% had a female householder with no husband present, 6.5% had a male householder with no wife present, and 23.2% were non-families. 18.8% of all households were made up of individuals, and 4.4% had someone living alone who was 65 years of age or older. The average household size was 2.67 and the average family size was 3.03.

The median age in the village was 32.7 years. 28.6% of residents were under the age of 18; 6.8% were between the ages of 18 and 24; 31.6% were from 25 to 44; 25.5% were from 45 to 64; and 7.8% were 65 years of age or older. The gender makeup of the village was 52.4% male and 47.6% female.

=== 2000 census ===
As of the census of 2000, there were 1,105 people, 401 households, and 305 families living in the village. The population density was 3,427.1 inhabitants per square mile (1,323.2/km^{2}). There were 413 housing units at an average density of 1,280.9 units per square mile (494.6 units/km^{2}). The racial makeup of the village was 98.37% White, 0.45% Native American, 0.09% from other races, and 1.09% from two or more races. Hispanic or Latino of any race were 1.45% of the population.

There were 401 households, out of which 45.4% had children under the age of 18 living with them, 60.1% were married couples living together, 10.5% had a female householder with no husband present, and 23.9% were non-families. 20.4% of all households were made up of individuals, and 6.5% had someone living alone who was 65 years of age or older. The average household size was 2.76 and the average family size was 3.20.

In the village, the population was spread out, with 31.6% under the age of 18, 8.1% from 18 to 24, 34.9% from 25 to 44, 18.8% from 45 to 64, and 6.6% who were 65 years of age or older. The median age was 32 years. For every 100 females, there were 105.0 males. For every 100 females age 18 and over, there were 105.4 males.

The median income for a household in the village was $45,750, and the median income for a family was $48,947. Males had a median income of $33,250 versus $22,788 for females. The per capita income for the village was $17,154. About 2.5% of families and 2.9% of the population were below the poverty line, including 2.6% of those under age 18 and 2.9% of those age 65 or over. Many people in 2020 in Eagle Nebraska are of the party Republican.

== Education ==
It is in the Waverly School District 145.

== Sports and leisure ==
The Eagle Raceway dirt track is located two miles east of Eagle on U.S. Route 34. The track consistently features winged sprints and modifieds in their weekly shows from April to September.

Eagle is a popular stop for riders of the MoPac Trail as it is exactly 10 miles from the 84th Street trailhead in Lincoln.
