= Cowtown Speedway =

Automobile raceway in Kennedale, Texas, US

Coordinates: 32°37′38″N 97°13′0″W

Cowtown Speedway was a 0.25-mile-long (0.40 km) high bank clay track automobile raceway in Kennedale, Texas, that hosted weekend races for classes such as Dwarf cars, Sprint cars, stock cars and go-karts.

== Touring Series ==
The POWRi Midget Racing National Tour was scheduled to hold their first race in Texas to open their 2012 season at Cowtown but it was postponed. The United States Modified Touring Series (USMTS) held a Southern Tour in May 2008; local drivers were the top three finishers.
