= Tri-State Speedway (Indiana) =

Dirt oval racing track in Haubstadt, Indiana

- Location: Haubstadt, Indiana
- Coordinates: 38°12′19″N 87°33′12″W
- Owner: Tom & Loris Helfrich
- Opened: 1957
- Major events: World of Outlaws; USAC National Sprint Car Championship

oval
- Surface: Dirt
- Length: 0.25 mi (0.40 km)
- Turns: 4
- Race lap record: 11.110 Seconds (Sammy Swindell, 2004, World of Outlaws Sprint Car Series)

Tri-State Speedway is a high-banked 1/4 mile (0.40 km) dirt oval track located in Haubstadt, Indiana, approximately 16 miles (26 km) north of Evansville, Indiana. The track currently hosts World of Outlaws sprint cars, USAC sprints, POWRi Lucas Oil WAR sprints, MSCS Sprints, and UMP modifieds.

== History ==
Opened in 1957 by Ed Helfrich, the track has been owned by the Helfrich family since. NASCAR on FOX commentator Adam Alexander began his career as a public address announcer at the track in the late 1990s. The track has previously hosted events from the World of Outlaws Late Model Series, USAC Midgets, and the Lucas Oil ASCS National Tour. NASCAR Cup Series driver Chase Briscoe's father Kevin Briscoe was a five-time champion at Tri-State.

=== World of Outlaws Winners ===
Year	Date	Driver
1979	May 19	Lee James
1979	Aug 19	Larry Gates
1980	May 11	Steve Kinser
No races from 1981–1987
1988	May 15	Bobby Davis Jr. and Sammy Swindell (co-winners)
1989	May 14	Steve Kinser
1990	May 13	Doug Wolfgang
1991	May 12	Doug Wolfgang
1991	July 14	Steve Kinser
1992	May 10	Gary Wright
1992	July 26	Sammy Swindell
1993	May 16	Dave Blaney
1993	July 18	Andy Hillenburg
1994	May 15	Andy Hillenburg
1994	July 17	Dave Blaney
1995	May 14	Stevie Smith
1995	July 16	Steve Kinser
1996	May 12	Mark Kinser
1997	May 11	Steve Kinser
1997	June 22	Sammy Swindell
1998	May 10	Mark Kinser
1998	June 21	Sammy Swindell
1999	May 16	Mark Kinser
No races from 2000–2003
2004	Oct 8	Tim Kaeding
2005	April 16	Steve Kinser
2006	April 15	Craig Dollansky
2007	April 21	Steve Kinser
2008	July 6	Craig Dollansky
2009	June 25	Steve Kinser
2010	Oct 16	Craig Dollansky
2011	May 30	Sammy Swindell
2012	April 21	Craig Dollansky
2013	April 20	Tim Kaeding
2014	May 10	Paul McMahan
2015	May 3	Paul McMahan
2016	May 14	David Gravel
2017	May 14	Parker Price-Miller
2018	May 13	David Gravel
2019	October 13	Christopher Bell
2020	June 19	Carson Short
2020	June 20	Carson Macedo
2021	April 10	Carson Macedo
2022	April 23	Carson Macedo
