= Eagle Raceway =

Coordinates: 40.810464°N 96.390867°W

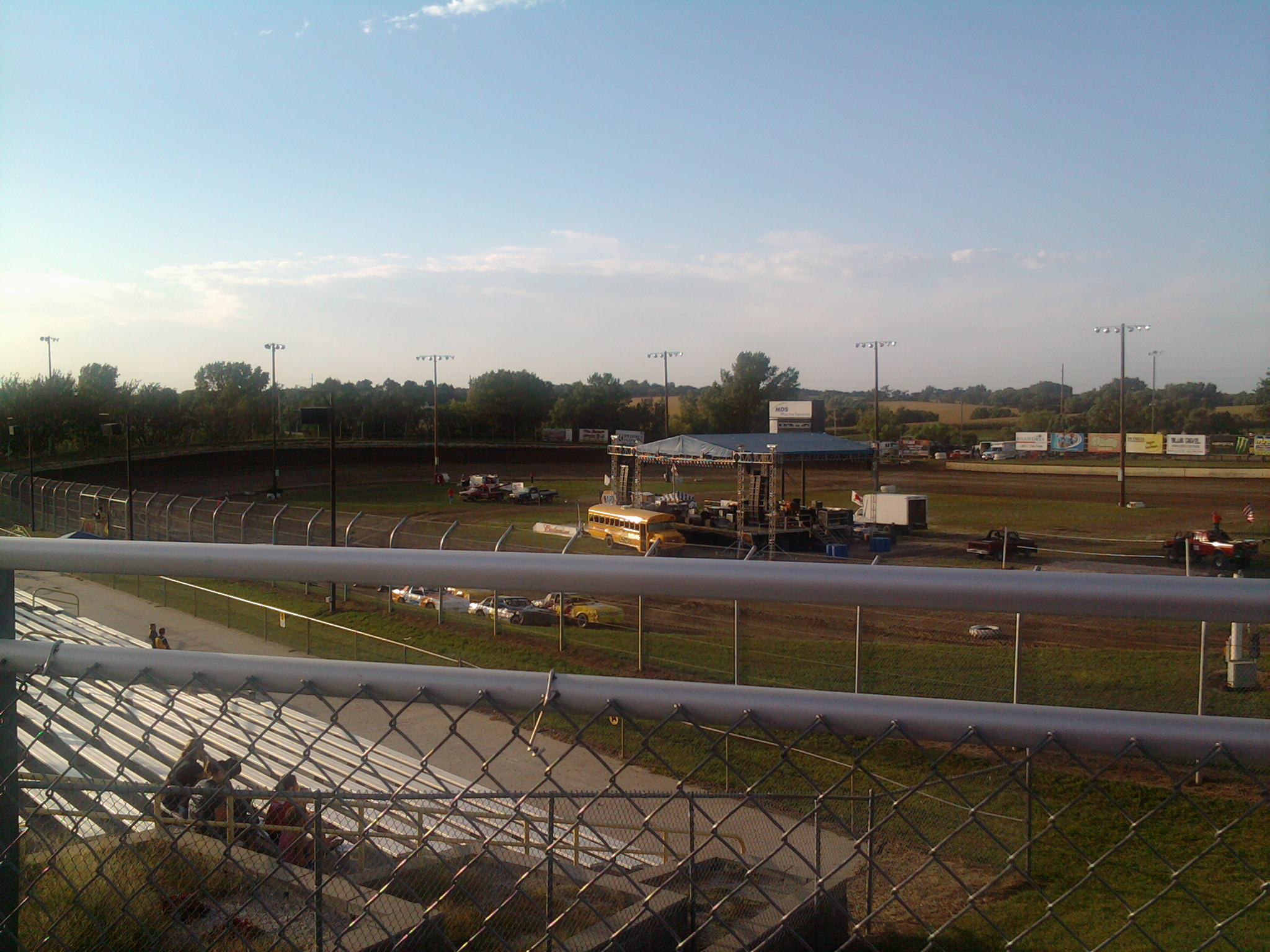
View from the turn one grandstand.

Eagle Raceway is a one-third mile dirt track located two miles (3 km) east of Eagle, Nebraska on U.S. Highway 34 in Cass County, Nebraska, often referred to by some as the "World's Fastest Third Mile" because of its speed. The track is located approximately fifteen miles east of Lincoln, Nebraska.

A regular weekly show at the track (Saturday nights from April to September) generally consists of IMCA-Sanctioned 305 Sprint Cars, Modifieds, Stock Cars, Hobby Stocks, and SportMods.

== Track History ==
In 1963, Eagle, Nebraska, residents Dale Halvorsen and Harvey Kropp constructed the racetrack out of farm ground owned by Halvorsen. Kropp served as promoter of the races. The unique terrain allowed for a high-banked bowl-shaped racetrack to be carved out of surrounding hills. The hills provided an easy location for above-track grandstands.

Kropp and Halvorsen promoted primarily open wheel racing events throughout the 1960s and 1970s, ending their promotion of racing after an abbreviated 1976 season in which the only death at the speedway occurred after Jim Golden flipped in turn one after releasing his seatbelts shortly after winning his preliminary heat race.

The track remained dormant until 1978 when Paul Saenz leased the track from Halvorsen and raced Late Model Stock Cars weekly.

In 1984, the track was purchased by John Beecham, his wife Laura and John's brother Marty.

The Beechams began a major renovation project, razing the decaying original scorer's tower and concession stands and constructing a new, two level concession stand and scorer's / VIP area. The old seats were replaced with seating for approximately 5000 fans. The race program consisted of a Friday night winged sprint cars program and a Saturday night NASCAR-sanctioned weekly stock car program. For the 1985 season, the days of the stock car and sprint car program were reversed and IMCA Modifieds were added to the Sprint Car show on Saturdays.

The 1987 season saw the introduction of the USAC Midget Series in the Midsummer Midget Classic, which brought future NASCAR Sprint Cup stars to the track. Winners of the annual race include Jeff Gordon (1990) and Tony Stewart (1994).

In 1997, the Beecham Family sold the track to Craig Cormack and racing partner Dean Orth operating as Eagle Entertainment, LLC. Cormack took full control of the racetrack in 1999 and continued the weekly program with stock cars on Friday and Sprint Cars & Modifieds on Saturday. As part of the new ownership, the wooden bleachers were replaced with concrete and aluminum stadium seating, with an additional two sections of seats were added in 2000 including a 40-foot (12 m) high section of aluminum grandstand and a smaller section of 750-seat wood bleachers, increasing the seating capacity to 7500.

The track focused on the entertainment model put forth by such groups as World Wrestling Entertainment, emphasizing activity in the stands as well as the track, and a 100,000-watt sound system was added in 1997. Notable was the inclusion of track announcer Rick Allen Schwieger, who is the current NBC Sports motorsport play-by-play announcer (he does not use his surname on stage).

In 2001, blaming poor attendance and participation by race teams, Cormack ended the Friday night stock car program.

After the 2005 season, again citing poor attendance, increased criticism on Internet Forums and lack of profit during his ownership, Cormack closed the racetrack and put it up for sale. Former Late Model driver Roger Hadan entered a lease agreement with Cormack to operate the racetrack in 2006, and continued the relationship through 2007. Hadan added IMCA Hobby Stocks and Sport Compacts to the Saturday Night program. Hadan also gained notoriety for promotion of school bus races and other novelty acts for fans. In 2007 he added a JumboTron.

Since 2023 the High Limit Sprint Car Series has come to Eagle Raceway yearly.
