= 1971 California 500 =

American auto race

(United States) 1971 California 500
Race details
- Race 10 of 12 in the 1971 USAC Championship Car season
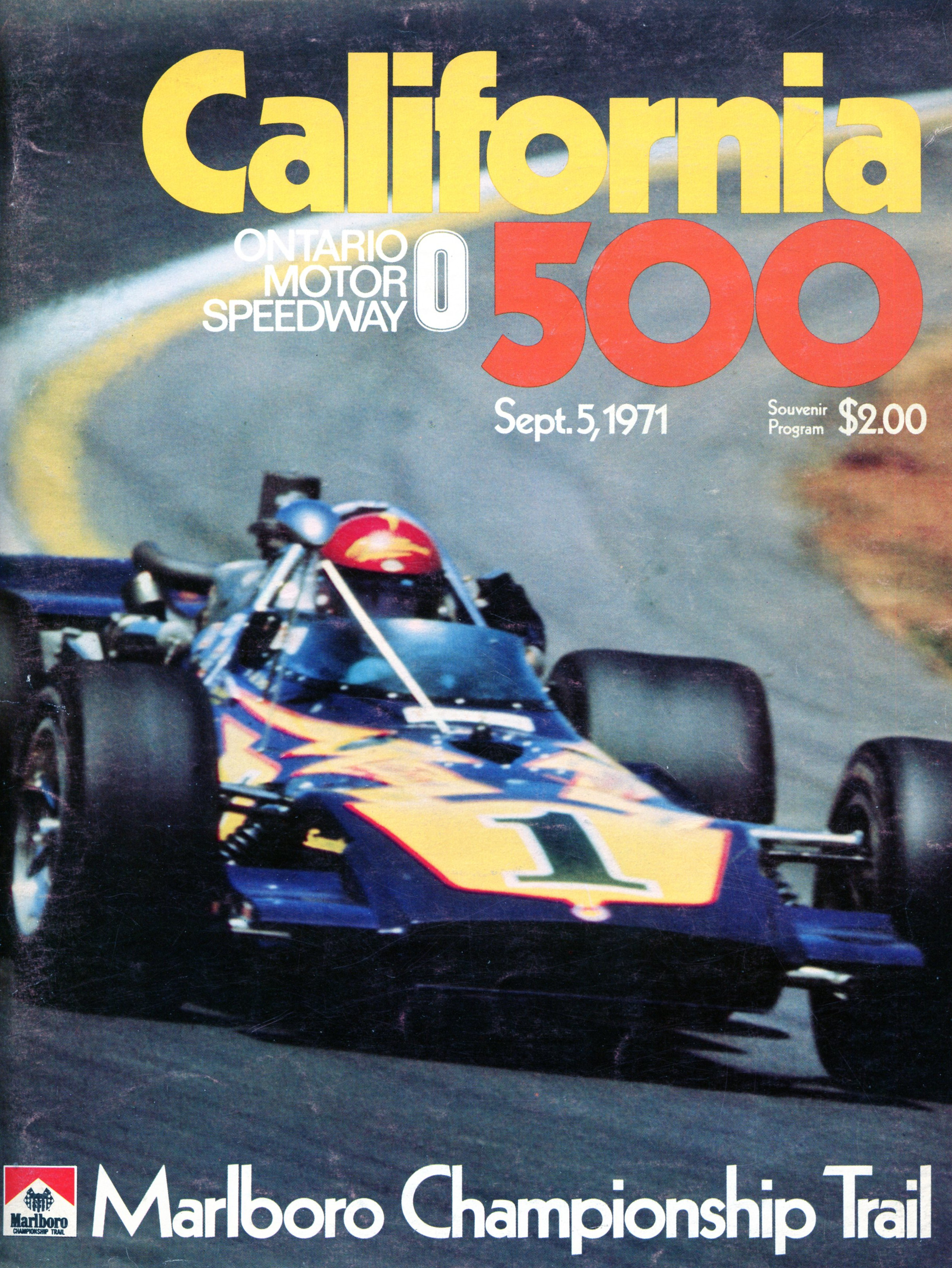
- Date: September 5, 1971
- Official name: 1971 California 500
- Location: Ontario Motor Speedway, Ontario, California, United States
- Course: Permanent racing facility 2.500 mi / 4.023 km
- Distance: 200 laps 500.000 mi / 804.672 km

Pole position
- Driver: (United States) Mark Donohue (Team Penske)
- Time: 185.004 mph (297.735 km/h)

Podium
- First: (United States) Joe Leonard (Vel's Parnelli Jones Racing)
- Second: (United States) Art Pollard (Gilmore Racing)
- Third: (United States) Gary Bettenhausen (Don Gerhardt)

The 1971 California 500, the second running of the event, was held at the Ontario Motor Speedway in Ontario, California, on Sunday, September 5, 1971. The event was race number 10 of 12 in the 1971 USAC Championship Car season. The race was won by Joe Leonard.

== Background ==
In 1971, the Pocono 500 was added to the IndyCar schedule, beginning IndyCar racing's Triple Crown of 500 mile races. The three races became the highest-paying events in American motorsports and carried 1000 points for the winner on the USAC Championship standings.

In March 1971, Ontario was the site of the Questor Grand Prix, a non-championship race for Formula One and Formula 5000 cars on the infield road course. Because of the smaller fuel tanks of the F5000 cars, the race was run in two heats of 32 laps, and the final result decided by a points system. Mario Andretti was declared the winner; with Jackie Stewart in second place and Denny Hulme third. Swede Savage suffered critical head injuries after a broken suspension sent him into the wall. Savage was near death for several days but made a full recovery and returned to racing at the California 500.

In May, Al Unser won the 1971 Indianapolis 500. It was his second consecutive win in the Memorial Day event.

== Practice and Time Trials ==
Practice began on Saturday, August 21. Only three cars participated in the first day of practice, with Bud Tingelstad posting the fastest speed at 149.350 mph. On Sunday, defending pole-sitter Lloyd Ruby ran a speed of 167.107 mph, with a total of six drivers making practice runs. Steve Krisiloff was fastest on Monday with a speed of 172.413 mph. Day four of practice saw Al Unser up the fastest speed to 177.409 mph. Bobby Unser was the first driver to go faster than 180 mph when he ran a lap speed of 180.977 mph on Wednesday. John Cannon crashed in turn one but was uninjured. In Thursday's practice, Mark Donohue set the fastest speed at 182.394 mph before crashing in turn three. Donohue's car suffered damage to the rear suspension but was repairable. Despite 101 degree temperatures on Friday, Bobby Unser ran the fastest speed all week at 182.593 mph. USAC scheduled a special qualifying session on Friday for McLaren drivers Peter Revson and Denny Hulme who planned to compete in the Can-Am Series race at Road America. Mechanical problems forced the cancelation of the session. As a result, Hulme withdrew from the California 500 and flew to Road America. Revson remained at Ontario to qualify on Saturday and would start the Can-Am race from the rear of the field on Sunday.

=== Pole Day - Saturday August 28 ===
Like at Indianapolis, qualifying was a four-lap, ten-mile average. Bobby Unser set a fast time early with an average speed of 182.066 mph. Recovering from his Thursday accident, Mark Donohue made his qualifying attempt late in the day. The Pocono 500 champion ran a four-lap average speed of 185.004 mph, with his first lap being a track record of 186.317 mph. The run gave Donohue the pole by a three mph margin over the second place Unser. Indianapolis pole-sitter, Peter Revson, completed the front row with an average speed of 180.741 mph. Returning from critical head injuries suffered at the track on March, Swede Savage qualified fourth with a speed of 180.396 mph. 29 cars qualified on Day One.

=== Bump Day - Sunday August 29 ===
Gary Bettenhausen was the fastest qualifier on Bump Day with an average speed of 177.447 mph. Other day two qualifiers included Dick Simon, Donnie Allison, and Cale Yarborough.

Bobby Unser flew back to Indianapolis and won a 100-mile USAC Stock Car race at the Indiana State Fairgrounds Speedway. Peter Revson won the Can-Am race at Road America.

== Race ==
168,420 spectators attended the race. A pre-race parade of celebrities around the track included Hugh Downs, Anthony Quinn, Hugh O'Brian, Glen Campbell, Paul Newman, Kirk Douglas, Greg Morris, Karen Valentine, Craig Breedlove, and Gary Gabelich. The National Anthem was sung by The Supremes. Shortly after the release of his 1971 film, Le Mans, Steve McQueen gave the command to start engines. Dan Gurney drove the Datsun 510 pace car.

From his position in the middle of the front row, Bobby Unser took the lead at the start. Before completing one lap, Mario Andretti had a distributor shaft break and retired. Donohue took the lead on lap four and continued to lead the next 49 laps. On lap six, George Snider hit the wall in turn two. Greg Weld crashed on lap 29.

Around lap 50, Donohue's team-owner Roger Penske signaled him to pit. Donohue failed to notice the pit board three times and ran out of fuel on the backstretch. He was towed back to the pits but the damage to the engine led to burnt piston later in the race. Donohue accepted blame, saying "anyone who doesn't have the sense to see a pit sign deserves to get knocked out of a race."

Peter Revson lost 20 laps in the pits when his McLaren team was forced to change his turbocharger. After repairs, Revson was the fastest car on track and drove to a 7th-place finish, 17 laps behind the leader. Johnny Rutherford's crew chief, Mike Devin, suffered first and second degree burns to his face when a flash fire occurred on a pit stop.

While running a close second to his brother on lap 118, Bobby Unser crashed in turn one when he suffered a broken rear wing support.

On lap 160, Al Unser retired from the race with a broken gearbox. Unser's teammate, Joe Leonard, inherited the lead. Unlike his teammate, Leonard was forced to run the inferior Ford engine instead of the more powerful Offenhauser.

Former Daytona 500 champion, Cale Yarborough, had a strong run and had climbed to third when he suffered clutch failure after completing 162 laps. After completing 166 laps, Swede Savage suffered suspension failure and brushed the wall, spinning into the infield.

Joe Leonard led the final 40 laps and drove to an easy victory. He earned $134,437 and won the Triple Crown points title, carrying a prize of $1,000 and a gold ring. For the second straight year, Art Pollard finished second, a lap behind Leonard.

== Box score ==
Finish	Grid	No	Name	Entrant	Chassis	Engine	Laps	Time/Status	Led	Points
1	11	15	(United States) Joe Leonard	Vel's Parnelli Jones Racing	Colt 71	Ford	200	3:16:55	40	1000
2	13	8	(United States) Art Pollard	Gilmore Champion Racing	Scorpion 70	Ford	199	Flagged	0	800
3	27	16	(United States) Gary Bettenhausen	Don Gerhardt	Gerhardt	Offenhauser	198	Flagged	0	700
4	14	12	(United States) Lloyd Ruby	Gene White Co.	Mongoose 70	Ford	198	Flagged	0	600
5	15	20	(United States) Steve Krisiloff	Andy Granatelli	King	Ford	196	Flagged	0	500
6	18	92	(United States) Jim Malloy	Shelby-Dowd	Eagle	Ford	187	Flagged	0	400
7	3	86	(United States) Peter Revson	Team McLaren	McLaren M16	Offenhauser	183	Flagged	0	300
8	12	3	(United States) Jim McElreath	Mitchner Petroleum	Eagle	Offenhauser	183	Flagged	0	250
9	33	75	(United States) John Mahler	John Mahler	McLaren M15	Offenhauser	179	Flagged	0	200
10	25	32	(United States) Bill Vukovich II	Jerry O'Connell Racing	Brabham BT25	Offenhauser	173	Flagged	0	150
11	31	70	(Canada) George Eaton	Fejer Racing Team	Colt	Ford	169	Flagged	0	100
12	4	42	(United States) Swede Savage	All American Racers	Eagle 70	Offenhauser	166	Crash	0	50
13	26	40	(United States) Larry Dickson	Andy Granatelli	King	Offenhauser	165	Flagged	0	0
14	30	21	(United States) Cale Yarborough	Gene White Co.	Mongoose 70	Ford	162	Clutch	0	0
15	6	1	(United States) Al Unser	Vel's Parnelli Jones Racing	Colt 71	Offenhauser	160	Gearbox	84	0
16	9	9	(United States) A. J. Foyt	A. J. Foyt Enterprises	Coyote 71	Ford	157	Rear end	7	0
17	22	58	(United States) Bud Tingelstad	Jerry O'Connell Racing	Brabham BT32	Offenhauser	156	Crash	0	0
18	1	66	(United States) Mark Donohue	Penske Racing	McLaren M16	Offenhauser	123	Valve	49	0
19	16	46	(United States) Jimmy Caruthers	Don Gerhardt	Gerhardt	Offenhauser	122	Block	0	0
20	19	7	(United States) Denny Zimmerman	Vollstedt Enterprises	McLaren	Offenhauser	119	Flagged	0	0
21	2	2	(United States) Bobby Unser	All American Racers	Eagle 71	Offenhauser	117	Crash	20	0
22	28	10	(United States) Dick Simon	Dick Simon Racing	Lola	Ford	89	Piston	0	0
23	17	22	(United States) Wally Dallenbach	Lindsey Hopkins Racing	Kuzma	Offenhauser	71	Gearbox	0	0
24	29	84	(United States) Donnie Allison	Foyt-Greer Racing	Coyote 71	Ford	64	Valve	0	0
25	10	23	(United States) Mel Kenyon	Lindsey Hopkins Racing	Kuzma	Ford	59	Valve	0	0
26	5	18	(United States) Johnny Rutherford	Mitchner Petroleum	Brabham	Offenhauser	54	Fire	0	0
27	7	85	(United States) Gordon Johncock	Team McLaren	McLaren M16	Offenhauser	51	Turbocharger	0	0
28	21	6	(United States) Roger McCluskey	Lindsey Hopkins Racing	Kuzma	Ford	40	Valve	0	0
29	32	37	(United States) Bruce Walkup	Myron Caves	Gerhardt	Offenhauser	28	Fuel leak	0	0
30	23	31	(United States) Greg Weld	Federal Engineering	Gerhardt	Offenhauser	27	Crash	0	0
31	24	95	(United States) Carl Williams	Vatis Enterprises	Eagle	Offenhauser	15	Piston	0	0
32	20	4	(United States) George Snider	Leader Card Racers	Eagle 68	Offenhauser	5	Crash	0	0
33	8	5	(United States) Mario Andretti	Andy Granatelli	McNamara T500	Ford	0	Electrical	0	0
