= 1971 Pocono 500 =

(United States) 1971 Pocono 500
Race details
- 7th round of the 1971 USAC Championship Car season
- Date: July 3, 1971
- Official name: 1971 Schaefer 500
- Location: Long Pond, Pennsylvania
- Course: Permanent racing facility 2.5 mi / 4.023 km
- Distance: 200 laps 500 mi / 804.672 km
- Weather: Temperatures up to 78 °F (26 °C); wind speeds up to 12 miles per hour (19 km/h)

Pole position
- Driver: (United States) Mark Donohue (Team Penske)
- Time: 172.393 mph

Podium
- First: (United States) Mark Donohue (Team Penske)
- Second: (United States) Joe Leonard (Vel's Parnelli Jones Racing)
- Third: (United States) A. J. Foyt (A. J. Foyt Racing)

The 1971 Pocono 500, the inaugural running of the event, was held at the Pocono Raceway in Long Pond, Pennsylvania, on Saturday, July 3, 1971. Branded as the 1971 Schaefer 500 for sponsorship reasons, the race is notable as the first IndyCar win for Team Penske and the first for driver Mark Donohue.

== Background ==
Plans for a Pennsylvania superspeedway extended as far back as 1957. The site picked was a large spinach farm in Long Pond, one farmed by German prisoners of war during World War II. In 1965, ground was broken and the triangular design was unveiled. Construction first began on a three-quarter mile infield short track. Construction of the 2.5 mile speedway was completed in early 1971.

In February 1970, USAC and Pocono Raceway signed a sanctioning agreement to host a 500-mile Indy car race and 500 mile stock car race. As part of the agreement, USAC agreed not to hold any other 500 mile races in 13 nearby states and would not hold any races within a 200-mile radius of Pocono. It was said that more spectators at the Indianapolis 500 came from Pennsylvania than any other state other than Indiana.

In December 1970, the track reached an agreement with Schaefer Beer to serve as presenting sponsor of the event, marking the first 500-mile race to have a corporate sponsor.

== Pre-race ==
A ribbon-cutting opening ceremony and practice was held on Saturday, June 19, 1971. Jim Malloy was the first driver on the track and made five slow laps before returning to the garage.

In practice on Tuesday, June 22, Indianapolis 500 champion, Al Unser, had the fastest speed at over 169 mph. Indianapolis runner-up, Peter Revson, was second fastest at 165.7 mph. Wally Dallenbach became the first driver to crash when he spun in turn two and damaged the left side of his car. Seven year-old, Billy Vukovich III, fell out of the infield grandstands and suffered a chip in the bone in his arm and a cut on his chin which required 14 stitches.

On Wednesday, Peter Revson became the first driver to break the 170 mph barrier when he posted a lap of 170.325 mph.

Mark Donohue's McLaren car, owned by Team Penske, was destroyed in a crash at the Indianapolis 500 and a new one was constructed for Pocono. In Thursday's practice, Donohue posted the fastest speed at 172 mph.

The first day of qualifying was held on Saturday, June 26. Like at Indianapolis, qualifying was a four-lap, 10-mile average. An estimated crowd of 30,000 spectators was on hand. Bobby Unser set the fast time early with an average speed of 171.847 mph. At 5:00 in the afternoon, Mark Donohue eclipsed Unser's speed with an average of 172.393 mph. Al Unser qualified third with a time of 170.365 mph.

For the first time, USAC officials returned the pace car to the track to pace the field during caution flags. At Indianapolis in 1971, cars would pace themselves under caution. At Pocono, cars were allowed to bunch up behind the pace car and the leader's advantage was erased at caution flags.

Strongly opposed to this bunch up rule was Roger Penske, owner of Mark Donohue's car. "It makes it a sideshow, a carnival, it's Mickey Mouse," Penske said. "It penalized the top cars."

== Race ==
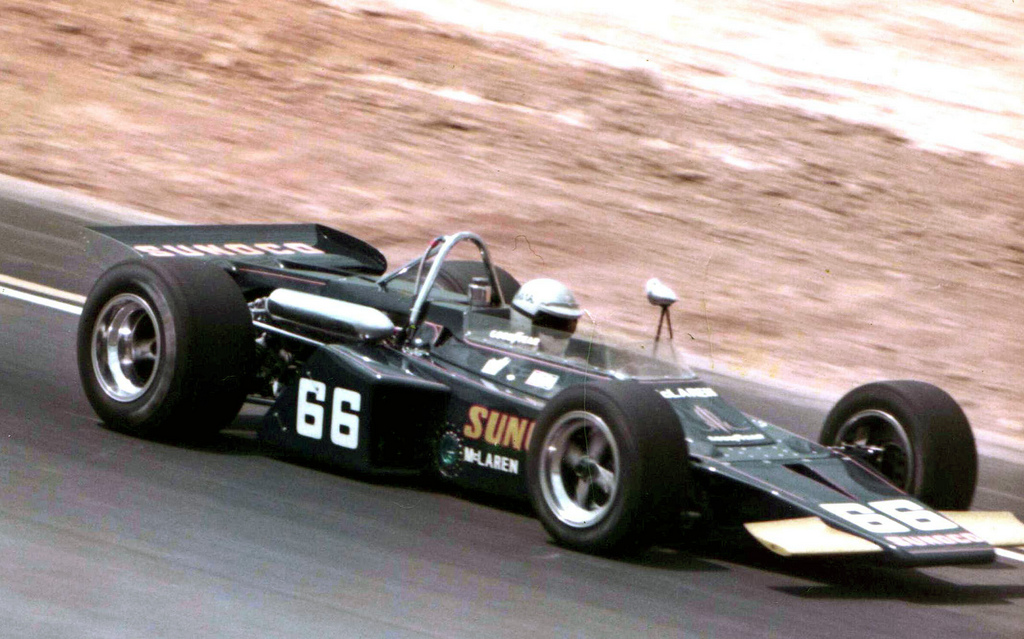
Mark Donohue won the inaugural Pocono 500 in 1971.

At the drivers meeting, Indianapolis Motor Speedway track-owner, Tony Hulman presented Pocono owner Joseph Mattioli with a gold-plated brick taken from the original paving at Indianapolis. Indianapolis track announcer, Tom Carnegie, served as track announcer at Pocono. Notable attendees included Paul Newman, Walter Cronkite, Evel Knievel, Pennsylvania Governor Milton Shapp, former Governor William Scranton, three-time Indianapolis 500 winner Louis Meyer, two-time Indy winner Rodger Ward, and Linda Vaughn. Grand marshal Enzo Stuarti sang the national anthem. Tony Hulman gave the command to start engines.

The pace car was a 1971 Chevy Camaro SS prepared by Roger Penske Chevrolet of Philadelphia. Driving the pace car was Sam Hanks, winner of the 1957 Indianapolis 500.

When the race began, Mark Donohue drove away from his competitors to a sizable lead. Cale Yarborough brought out the caution on lap 18 when his engine blew and the car stopped in turn two. After 32 laps, Indianapolis 500 champion, Al Unser, was black-flagged by officials for leaking oil and fell out of the race.

On lap 43, Steve Krisiloff brought out the caution flag when he spun and lightly hit the wall in turn two. Under pit stops, Joe Leonard left his pit stall too early and left with the fuel hose still attached. He was black-flagged and returned to the pits to remove the fuel coupling.

With 50 laps complete, Donnie Allison spun in oil and hit the turn one wall. Allison then flew to Daytona Beach, Florida where he had won the pole for NASCAR's Firecracker 400. Allison finished fifth there the following day.

At lap 96, John Mahler hit the wall in turn one. Through the middle stages of the race, Bobby Unser, A.J. Foyt, and Joe Leonard took turns leading.

On lap 165, Dick Simon's car caught fire and he suffered first and second degree burns on his arm and leg before he could bring the car to a stop.

Bobby Unser led 34 laps but was slowed late in the race with a broken turbocharger wheel. He finished 9th, ten laps behind the race winner.

The final of six caution flags was thrown on lap 183 for oil on the track. This allowed Joe Leonard to catch up to Mark Donohue. The green flag returned on lap 189.

On lap 191, the car driven by Sammy Sessions dropped oil in turn two. Donohue slipped and was passed by Joe Leonard, who led for the next three laps. On lap 194, Donohue passed Leonard on the frontstretch to regain the lead. The Pennsylvania driver led for the final seven laps and beat Leonard by 1.6 seconds. The race was slowed by six cautions for 38 laps and Donohue averaged 138.649 mph over the 500 miles.

Donohue flew to Brainerd, MN and competed in the Trans-Am race the following day. Donohue won on the road course to claim his second win in 27 hours.

In addition to $87,874 in prize money, Donohue was awarded the 1971 Chevy Camaro SS pace car, a 14k gold ring, the Autosprint trophy for completing the fastest lap of the race, and 100 pounds of beef from Hungry Ed's Market in Blakeslee. The Pocono 500 victory bruncheon was held at the Mount Airy Lodge the following morning. Donohue's wife, Sue, collected the awards at the bruncheon on his behalf.

Prior to the race, officials expected over 100,000 spectators. While the event would reach that figure in following years, the crowd in 1971 was estimated at 75,000.

== Box score ==
Finish	Grid	No	Name	Entrant	Chassis	Engine	Laps	Time/Status	Led	Points
1	1	66	(United States) Mark Donohue	Penske Racing	McLaren M16A	Offenhauser	200	3:36:22.312	126	1000
2	4	15	(United States) Joe Leonard	Vel's Parnelli Jones Racing	Colt 71	Ford	200	+1.688	31	800
3	8	9	(United States) A. J. Foyt	A. J. Foyt Enterprises	Coyote 71	Ford	200	+17.688	9	700
4	5	5	(United States) Mario Andretti	Andy Granatelli	McNamara T500	Ford	198	Flagged	0	600
5	16	32	(United States) Bill Vukovich II	Jerry O'Connell Racing	Brabham BT25	Offenhauser	198	Flagged	0	500
6	13	16	(United States) Gary Bettenhausen	Don Gerhardt	Gerhardt 70	Offenhauser	198	Flagged	0	400
7	12	18	(United States) Johnny Rutherford	Mitchner Petroleum	Eagle 67	Offenhauser	197	Flagged	0	300
8	14	12	(United States) Lloyd Ruby	Gene White Co.	Mongoose 70	Ford	197	Flagged	0	250
9	2	2	(United States) Bobby Unser	All American Racers	Eagle 71	Offenhauser	190	Flagged	34	200
10	20	20	(United States) Steve Krisiloff	Andy Granatelli	King	Offenhauser	190	Flagged	0	150
11	29	98	(United States) Sammy Sessions	Agajanian-Faas Racers	Lola T150	Ford	187	Black flagged	0	100
12	28	31	(United States) Greg Weld	Federal Engineering	Gerhardt	Offenhauser	186	Flagged	0	50
13	20	64	(United States) Jimmy Caruthers	Gilmore Champion Racing	Scorpion 70	Ford	183	Flagged	0	0
14	27	80	(United States) Bill Puterbaugh	Leader Card Racers	Eagle 68	Offenhauser	181	Flagged	0	0
15	19	22	(United States) Wally Dallenbach	Lindsey Hopkins Racing	Kenyon	Ford	181	Flagged	0	0
16	25	8	(United States) Art Pollard	Gilmore Champion Racing	Scorpion 70	Ford	171	Oil tank	0	0
17	11	10	(United States) Dick Simon	Dick Simon Racing	Lola	Ford	145	Fire	0	0
18	26	28	(United States) Bill Simpson	Bill Simpson	Eagle	Offenhauser	119	Engine	0	0
19	21	58	(United States) Bud Tingelstad	Jerry O'Connell Racing	Brabham BT32	Offenhauser	115	Manifold	0	0
20	6	7	(United States) Gordon Johncock	Vollstedt Enterprises	Vollstedt	Offenhauser	101	Fuel pump	0	0
21	7	86	(United States) Peter Revson	Team McLaren	McLaren M16	Offenhauser	99	Radiator	0	0
22	23	95	(United States) Bentley Warren	Vatis Enterprises	Eagle 66	Offenhauser	92	Fuel	0	0
23	30	44	(United States) John Mahler	Dick Simon Racing	Vollstedt	Ford	92	Crash	0	0
24	17	43	(United States) Denny Zimmerman	Fiore Racing	Vollstedt	Offenhauser	88	Clutch	0	0
25	18	6	(United States) Roger McCluskey	Lindsey Hopkins Racing	Kenyon	Ford	79	Valve	0	0
26	24	92	(United States) Jim Malloy	Shelby-Dowd	Eagle	Ford	68	Valve	0	0
27	32	77	(United States) Jim McElreath	Dayton-Walther	Morris	Ford	68	Valve	0	0
28	15	84	(United States) Donnie Allison	Foyt-Greer Racing	Coyote 71	Ford	48	Crash	0	0
29	31	19	(United States) Bob Harkey	MVS	Cecil	Ford	39	Oil leak	0	0
30	33	56	(United States) Jim Hurtubise	Jim Hurtubise	Mallard	Offenhauser	35	Engine	0	0
31	3	1	(United States) Al Unser	Vel's Parnelli Jones Racing	Colt 71	Ford	32	Oil pump	0	0
32	10	21	(United States) Cale Yarborough	Gene White Co.	Mongoose 70	Ford	15	Engine	0	0
33	9	4	(United States) George Snider	Leader Card Racers	Eagle 68	Ford	10	Piston	0	0

=== Race statistics ===
Lap Leaders
Laps	Leader
1–32	Mark Donohue
33–44	Joe Leonard
45–64	Bobby Unser
65–77	Mark Donohue
78–85	Bobby Unser
86–91	Joe Leonard
92–95	A. J. Foyt
96–125	Mark Donohue
126–130	Bobby Unser
131–139	Joe Leonard
140–144	A. J. Foyt
145–154	Mark Donohue
155	Bobby Unser
156	Joe Leonard
157–190	Mark Donohue
191–193	Joe Leonard
194–200	Mark Donohue

== Broadcasting ==
Live radio coverage of the race was broadcast by the Motor Racing Network, anchored by Ken Squier. Initial plans called for the Indianapolis Motor Speedway Radio Network with Sid Collins to air the race.

One week after the race, a 2-hour syndicated television broadcast was aired on July 10, by the Century TeleSports Network. Charlie Brockman and Jim Karvellas called the race. Duane Dow and Jim Wilson reported from the pits.
