= 1971 USAC Championship Car season =

Sports season

- USAC Marlboro Championship Trail

Season
- Races: 12
- Start date: February 28
- End date: October 23

Awards
- National champion: (United States) Joe Leonard
- Indianapolis 500 winner: (United States) Al Unser

The 1971 USAC Championship Car season consisted of 12 races, beginning in Rafaela, Argentina on February 28 and concluding in Avondale, Arizona on October 23. The USAC National Champion was Joe Leonard and the Indianapolis 500 winner was Al Unser. For 1971 it was decided that there should be three separate points championships, for paved ovals, dirt ovals, and road courses.

The existing Championship Car championship was then restricted to only paved ovals, and two new championships were created. The National Dirt Car Championship (which would become the modern Silver Crown Series in 1981) was run over four races, and won by George Snider. The Road Racing championship was originally to be run over between 8 and 10 races, however a lack of interest lead to just two races being held on the same day, on the 7th of August at Seattle International Raceway. Continental Championship cars were allowed, and made up the majority of the grid, with just 5 USAC specification cars entered. Jim Dittemore won the series in a Formula 5000 specification Lola T192-Chevrolet. The Road Racing championship did not continue in 1972.

== Entrants ==
(partial list)

Team	Chassis	Engine	Drivers	Rounds
(United States) Vel's Parnelli Jones Racing	Colt	Ford	(United States) Al Unser	All
(United States) Vel's Parnelli Jones Racing	Colt	Ford	(United States) Joe Leonard	All
(United States) A.J. Foyt Enterprises	Coyote	Ford	(United States) A. J. Foyt	3, 5-12
(United States) A.J. Foyt Enterprises	Scorpion	Ford	(United States) Art Pollard	2-12
(United States) All American Racers	Eagle	Offenhauser	(United States) Bobby Unser	1, 3-12
(United States) All American Racers	Eagle	Offenhauser	(United States) Swede Savage	1-3, 10-12
(United States) All American Racers	Eagle	Offenhauser	(United States) LeeRoy Yarbrough	4-5
(United States) Dick Simon Racing	Lola (1-3, 7-12), Volstedt (4-6)	Ford	(United States) Dick Simon	1, 3-12
(United States) Andy Granatelli	McNamara	Ford	(United States) Mario Andretti	1, 3-12
(United States) Andy Granatelli	Brawner Hawk (3-4), Volstedt (5), King (7-12)	Ford (3-5, 7, 10), Offennhauser (8-9, 11-12)	(United States) Steve Krisiloff	3-5, 7-12
(United States) Gene White Racing	Mongoose	Ford	(United States) Lloyd Ruby	All
(United States) Gene White Racing	Mongoose	Ford	(United States) Cale Yarborough	All
(United States) Gerhardt	Gerhardt	Offenhauser	(United States) Gary Bettenhausen	All
(United States) Grant King	King	Offenhauser	(United States) Roger McCluskey	1-2
(United States) Jerry O'Connell Racing	Heyhoe	Offenhauser	(United States) Bill Vukovich II	4-12
(United States) Leader Card Racing	Watson	Ford (1-5), Offenhauser (12)	(United States) Mike Mosley	1-5, 12
(United States) Lindsey Hopkins Racing	Kuzma	Offenhauser	(United States) Wally Dallenbach	3-11
(United States) Lindsey Hopkins Racing	Kuzma	Ford (3-11), Offenhauser (12)	(United States) Roger McCluskey	3-12
(United States) McLaren	McLaren	Offenhauser	(United States) Peter Revson	5, 7, 10
(United States) Patrick Racing	Eagle (3-8, 11), Brabham (10, 12)	Offenhauser	(United States) Johnny Rutherford	3-8, 10-12
(United States) Team Penske	Lola (3-4, 7), McLaren (5, 8, 10-12)	Offenhauser (3, 5, 8, 10-12), Ford (4, 7)	(United States) Mark Donohue	3-5, 7-8, 10-12
(United States) Volstedt Racing	Volstedt	Ford	(United States) Wally Dallenbach	12
(United States) Volstedt Racing	Volstedt	Offenhauser	(United States) Johnny Rutherford	1-2

== Schedule and results ==
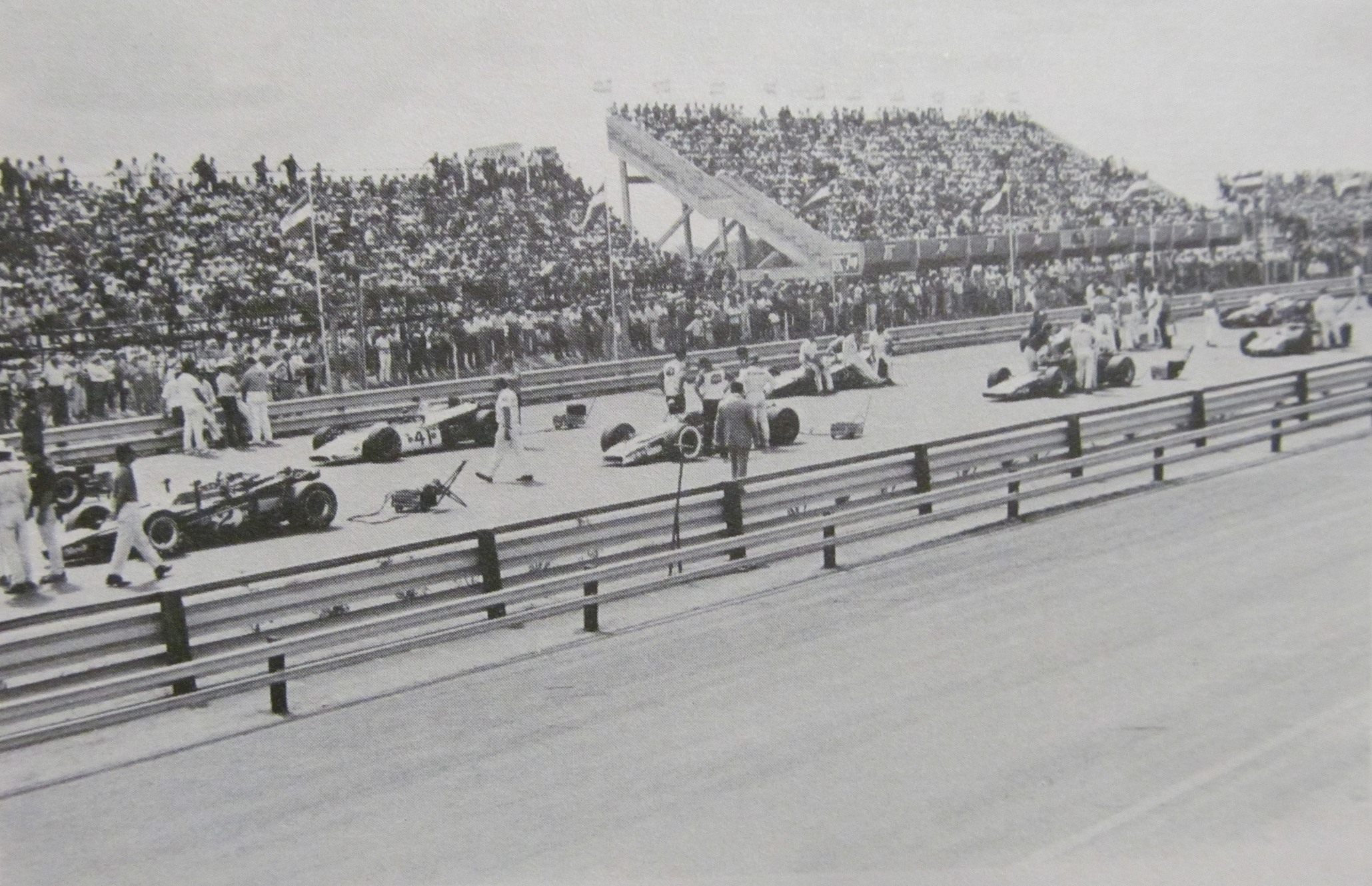
Grid before the start of the Rafaela Indy 300

All races were run on oval speedways. On February 18, the non-championship races at Rafaela were transformed into a points-paying double round, due to a request from race organizers. On June 3, the Langhorne round was cancelled by its promoter because of insufficient entries. He alleged that the event had been boycotted by a number of drivers refusing to race at the outdated venue, which was torn down at the end of the year. On June 30, USAC cancelled the race at the new Mountaineer Speedway, which was never built to completion. The 1971 season was the first time the 500 mile triple crown was on the schedule with the addition of Ontario Motor Speedway's California 500 the previous year and the Pocono 500 added in this season.

Rnd	Date	Race name	Track	Location	Pole position	Winning driver
1	February 28	(Argentina) Rafaela Indy 300 Heat 1	Autódromo de Rafaela	Rafaela, Argentina	(United States) Lloyd Ruby	(United States) Al Unser
2	February 28	(Argentina) Rafaela Indy 300 Heat 2	Autódromo de Rafaela	Rafaela, Argentina	(United States) Al Unser	(United States) Al Unser
3	March 27	(United States) Phoenix 150	Phoenix International Raceway	Avondale, Arizona	(United States) Bobby Unser	(United States) Al Unser
4	April 25	(United States) Trenton 200	Trenton International Speedway	Trenton, New Jersey	(United States) Bobby Unser	(United States) Mike Mosley
5	May 29	(United States) International 500 Mile Sweepstakes	Indianapolis Motor Speedway	Speedway, Indiana	(United States) Peter Revson	(United States) Al Unser
6	June 6	(United States) Rex Mays Classic 150	Wisconsin State Fair Park Speedway	West Allis, Wisconsin	(United States) Bobby Unser	(United States) Al Unser
-	June 13	(United States) Langhorne 150	Langhorne Speedway	Langhorne, Pennsylvania	Race cancelled due to security concerns	
7	July 3	(United States) Inaugural Pocono 500	Pocono International Raceway	Long Pond, Pennsylvania	(United States) Mark Donohue	(United States) Mark Donohue
8	July 18	(United States) Michigan 200	Michigan International Speedway	Brooklyn, Michigan	(United States) Bobby Unser	(United States) Mark Donohue
-	August 8	(United States) Mountaineer 150	Mountaineer Speedway	Parkersburg, West Virginia	Race cancelled	
9	August 15	(United States) Tony Bettenhausen 200	Wisconsin State Fair Park Speedway	West Allis, Wisconsin	(United States) Bobby Unser	(United States) Bobby Unser
10	September 5	(United States) California 500	Ontario Motor Speedway	Ontario, California	(United States) Mark Donohue	(United States) Joe Leonard
11	October 3*	(United States) Trenton 300	Trenton International Speedway	Trenton, New Jersey	(United States) Bobby Unser	(United States) Bobby Unser
12	October 23	(United States) Bobby Ball 150	Phoenix International Raceway	Avondale, Arizona	(United States) Bobby Unser	(United States) A. J. Foyt

Trenton 300 was originally schedulded for September 26, 1971 but was postponed due to rain.

== Final points standings ==
Note 1: Donnie Allison, Carlos Pairetti, Denny Hulme, David Hobbs and Jim Hurtubise were not eligible for points.

Note 2: John Mahler qualified 21st at Indianapolis. His car was driven in the race by Dick Simon who started 33rd as a result of the driver change.

Pos	Driver	RAF (Argentina)		PHX1 (United States)	TRE1 (United States)	INDY (United States)	MIL1 (United States)	POC (United States)	MIS (United States)	MIL2 (United States)	ONT (United States)	TRE2 (United States)	PHX2 (United States)	Pts
1	(United States) Joe Leonard	6	3	4	24	19	2	2	19	DNQ	1	3	10	3015
2	(United States) A. J. Foyt			17		3	20	3	17	2	16	5	1	2320
3	(United States) Bill Vukovich II				25	5	3	5	2	14	10	4	3	2250
4	(United States) Al Unser	1	**1**	1	21	1	1	31	24	17	15	17	21	2200
5	(United States) Lloyd Ruby	**2**	2	5	13	11	7	8	21	6	4	23	24	1830
6	(United States) Bobby Unser	27		**2**	**4**	12	**14**	9	**18**	**1**	21	**1**	**8**	1805
7	(United States) Gary Bettenhausen	11	7	20	16	10	16	6	22	3	3	24	5	1800
8	(United States) Mark Donohue			6	19	25		**1**	1		**18**	6	16	1760
9	(United States) Mario Andretti	Wth		9	18	30	11	4	12	19	33	2	4	1370
10	(United States) Wally Dallenbach Sr.			7	2	24	4	15	4	4	23	9	11	1220
11	(United States) Art Pollard			24	6	26	5	16	16	16	2	20	9	1170
12	(United States) Peter Revson					**2**		21			7			1100
13	(United States) Roger McCluskey	5	4	22	22	9	23	25	3	18	28	22	2	1050
14	(United States) Jim Malloy	14	21	11		4	DNS	26	13	DNQ	6			1030
15	(United States) Steve Krisiloff			DNQ	11	31		10	7	24	5	7	20	990
16	(United States) Cale Yarborough	8	8	13	5	16	DNQ	32	5	8	14	11	DNQ	710
17	(United States) Mike Mosley	3	23	10	1	13							19	655
18	(United States) Swede Savage	4	5	3							12	16	23	590
19	(United States) Johnny Rutherford	7	20	21	17	18	6	7	10		26	Wth	22	570
20	(United States) Dick Simon	13	6	12	7	14	9	17	15	DNQ	22	25	7	405
21	(United States) Jim McElreath					DNQ		27			8	27	6	370
22	(United States) Bud Tingelstad					7	DNQ	19			17			300
23	(United States) LeeRoy Yarbrough				3	Wth								280
24	(Canada) George Eaton RY									9	11	10	18	270
25	(United States) Greg Weld					DNQ	18	12		10	30	8	14	260
26	(United States) Denny Zimmerman	24	19	19		8	22	24	26		20	13	DNQ	250
27	(United States) Gordon Johncock	9	10	8	15	29	10	20	23	25	27	DNQ	DNQ	225
28	(United States) Sam Sessions				DNQ	27		11	DNQ	7	DNQ		13	220
29	(United States) George Snider			18		33	21	33	14	5	32	14	15	200
30	(United States) John Mahler	16	16		23	Wth		23			9			200
31	(United States) Larry Dickson					28			6	15	13	DNS		160
32	(United States) Bentley Warren	10	24	16	26	23	8	22		Wth				120
33	(United States) Karl Busson				DNQ				8	23		DNQ	DNQ	100
34	(United States) Bruce Walkup			DNQ	8	DNQ					29		DNQ	100
35	(United States) John Martin					DNQ	15		9	12	DNQ		DNQ	100
36	(United States) Al Loquasto				9	DNQ		DNQ			DNQ			80
37	(Canada) Ludwig Heimrath Sr.	25	18		10				DNQ					60
38	(United States) Jerry Karl				12	Wth			11	22				60
39	(United States) Carl Williams					DNQ				11	31	26	17	40
40	(United States) Salt Walther	15	11		DNQ	DNQ			20					30
41	(United States) Mel Kenyon					32	DNQ				25	12	DNQ	30
42	(United States) Bill Simpson	17	13	23		DNQ	19	18	DNQ		DNQ	28	12	15
43	(United States) Jimmy Caruthers					Wth	12	13			19		DNQ	15
44	(United States) Dee Jones	26	12	15		DNQ								15
-	(United States) Donnie Allison					6	17	28			24			0
-	(Argentina) Carlos Pairetti R	12	9											0
-	(United States) Bill Puterbaugh					DNQ		14	DNQ	13		19		0
-	(United States) Jerry Grant					DNQ	13							0
-	(United States) Don Brown	18	14		14					21		15	DNQ	0
-	(United States) Bob Harkey			14		22		29	DNQ		DNQ			0
-	(United States) Dave Strickland	19	15			Wth								0
-	(United States) George Follmer					15		DNQ						0
-	(United States) Max Dudley	20	17					DNQ						0
-	(New Zealand) Denny Hulme					17								0
-	(Canada) Eldon Rasmussen R											18	DNQ	0
-	(United States) Arnie Knepper				20	DNQ			25	20			DNQ	0
-	(United Kingdom) David Hobbs					20								0
-	(United States) Rick Muther	22	25	DNQ	DNQ	21	24							0
-	(United States) Tom Bigelow	21	22		DNQ									0
-	(United States) Tom Sneva R											21	DNQ	0
-	(United States) Larry Cannon	23	26			Wth			DNQ					0
-	(United States) Jim Hurtubise					DNQ		30			DNQ			0
-	(Argentina) Jorge Cupeiro	DNS												0
-	(Argentina) Omar Cuvertino	DNS												0
-	(Argentina) Ángel Monguzzi	DNS												0
-	(Argentina) Carlos Salatino	DNS												0
-	(United States) Jigger Sirois					DNQ								0
-	(United States) Les Scott					DNQ								0
-	(United States) Ralph Liguori			DNQ										0
-	(United States) Danny Ongais			DNQ										0
-	(United States) Bobby Allen				DNQ									0
-	(United States) Jim Reynard				DNQ									0
-	(United States) Gig Stephens				DNQ									0
-	(United States) Bobby Johns					DNQ								0
-	(United States) Sam Posey					DNQ								0
-	(United States) Dick Tobias											DNQ		0
-	(United States) Don Hawley												DNQ	0
-	(United States) Johnny Parsons												DNQ	0
-	(United States) Crockey Peterson												DNQ	0
-	(United States) Bruce Jacobi					Wth								0
-	(United States) Tony Adamowicz					Wth								0
-	(United States) Ronnie Bucknum					Wth								0
Pos	Driver	RAF1 (Argentina)	RAF2 (Argentina)	PHX1 (United States)	TRE1 (United States)	INDY (United States)	MIL1 (United States)	POC (United States)	MIS (United States)	MIL2 (United States)	ONT (United States)	TRE2 (United States)	PHX2 (United States)	Pts

Color	Result
Gold	Winner
Silver	2nd place
Bronze	3rd place
Green	4th & 5th place
Light Blue	6th-10th place
Dark Blue	Finished (Outside Top 10)
Purple	Did not finish (Ret)
Red	Did not qualify (DNQ)
Brown	Withdrawn (Wth)
Black	Disqualified (DSQ)
White	Did not start (DNS)
Blank	Did not participate (DNP)
Blank	Not competing

**In-line notation**
**Bold**	Pole position
Italics	Ran fastest race lap
*	Led most race laps
RY Rookie of the Year
R Rookie

== See also ==
- 1971 Indianapolis 500
