= Gordon Johncock =

American racing driver (1936–2026)

- Born: Gordon Walter Johncock; August 5, 1936 Hastings, Michigan, U.S.
- Died: September 28, 2026 (aged 90) South Branch, Michigan, U.S.

Championship titles
- USAC Championship Car (1976); Major victories Indianapolis 500 (1973, 1982); Michigan 500 (1982)

Champ Car career
- 262 races run over 26 years
- Best finish: 1st (1976)
- First race: 1964 Tony Bettenhausen Memorial (Springfield)
- Last race: 1992 Indianapolis 500 (Indianapolis)
- First win: 1965 Tony Bettenhausen 200 (Milwaukee)
- Last win: 1983 Dixie 200 (Atlanta)
Wins	Podiums	Poles
25	76	20

NASCAR Cup Series career
- 21 races run over 7 years
- First race: 1966 Daytona Qualifier #1 (Daytona)
- Last race: 1976 National 500 (Charlotte)
Wins	Top tens	Poles
0	4	0

Gordon Walter Johncock (August 5, 1936 – September 28, 2026) was an American racing driver. He won the 1973 and 1982 Indianapolis 500 and was the 1976 USAC Championship Car champion.

== Early years ==
Johncock was born in Hastings, Michigan, where his parents farmed, on August 5, 1936. He quit school while still in his teens and began competing at small tracks.

== Career ==
Johncock initially began racing supermodifieds at Michigan tracks like the Old Hastings, Michigan Raceway, Capital City Speedway in Lansing, Michigan, the Grand Rapids Michigan Speedrome, and later at Berlin Raceway in Marne, Michigan. In 1963, Johncock won the inaugural National Open sprint car race at Williams Grove Speedway. Johncock began his USAC and CART/IndyCar career in 1964 when he drove for Weinberger Racing. He ran four races in 1964, and then went full-time in 1965.

Johncock's first USAC victory was scored at the Milwaukee Mile in August 1965. In 1966, he went winless in nine starts out of 16 races, so he left Gerhardt Racing at the end of the year to form his own team, Johncock Racing. His primary sponsor became Gilmore Broadcasting and Johncock was the only other "owner-driver" in IndyCar with the other being A. J. Foyt.

Although Johncock's team won six races in a three-year period (1967-1969), things went downhill when Johncock lost the Gilmore sponsorship at the end of 1970. Between 1970 and 1973, Johncock went winless, his team shuttered operations, and Johncock found himself in bankruptcy court.

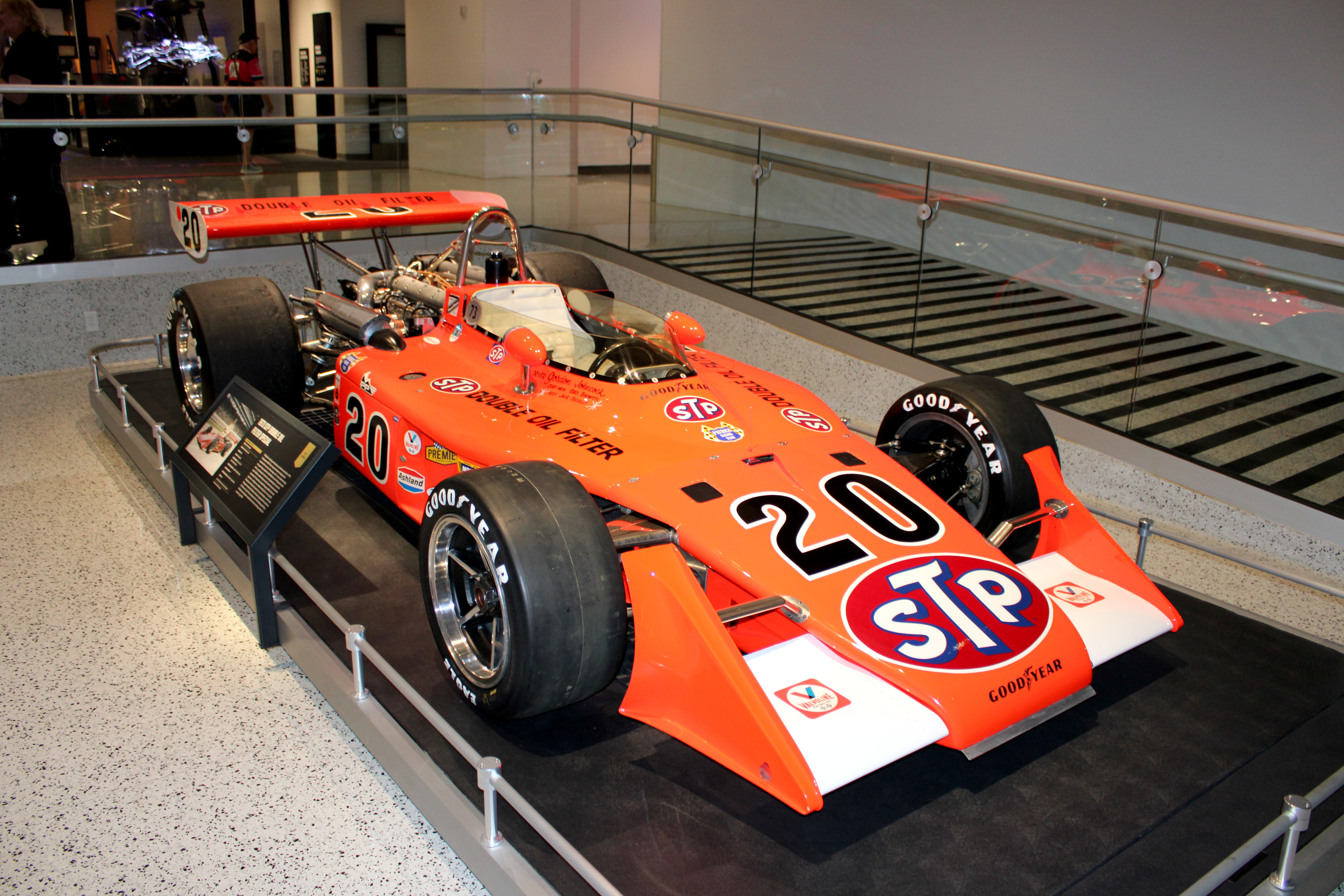
Johncock's winning car from the 1973 Indianapolis 500.

Johncock's winless drought came to an end when he joined the STP/Patrick Racing team ahead of the 1973 USAC season. At the 1973 Indianapolis 500, a major accident at the start involving Salt Walther, coupled with two days of rain, postponed the race until late Wednesday afternoon. When the race started up again on Wednesday, Johncock's teammate Swede Savage was severely injured in a fiery crash on lap 58. A moment later, Armando Teran, a pit crew member on the same STP/Patrick team, was struck by a fire truck going northbound in the pits, and was fatally injured.

When the race resumed, Johncock took the lead on lap 73 and held it until rain fell again on the 133rd lap. Nearing 6 p.m., the race was red flagged and declared over. After a short and muted victory lane celebration, Johncock went to visit Savage at the hospital. Afterward, the celebratory victory banquet was cancelled. Instead, Johncock and his crew went to a local fast-food restaurant for hamburgers. Thirty three days after the race, Savage succumbed to his injuries.

He won the USAC national championship in 1976, snatching the title from Johnny Rutherford, in the final race of the season, at Phoenix International Raceway. In 1976 and 1978 he finished third in the Indianapolis 500, and in 1977 he was leading A. J. Foyt when the car's crankshaft broke with sixteen laps to go. In 1979, he won the inaugural race contested under CART sanction, the Arizona Republic / Jimmy Bryan 150 at Phoenix.

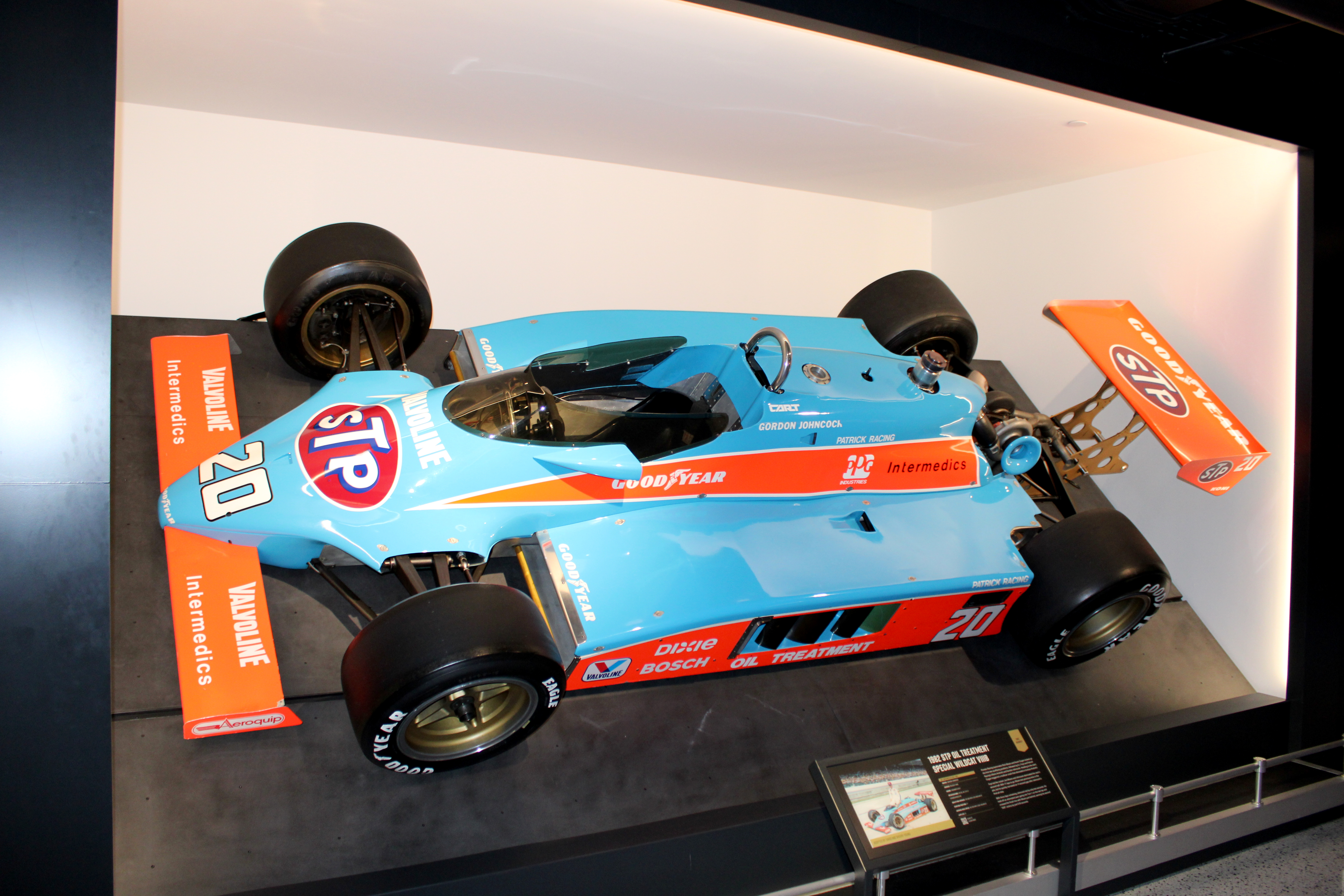
Johncock's winning car from the 1982 Indianapolis 500.

Johncock took his second Indianapolis 500 victory in 1982 by a car length over Rick Mears. After falling behind on the final sequence of pit stops, Mears was rapidly closing in on Johncock in the final laps, and on the 197th and 198th laps, came from 3 seconds back to be within a car length. Johncock's tires were rapidly deteriorating, and with each turn, the car understeered severely.

Mears caught Johncock at the start of the final lap and tried to pass him for the win, but Johncock made a decisive defense of his position in Turn One and held on to win the race by 0.16 seconds. At the time, it was the closest finish in Indianapolis 500 history and remains the fifth-closest behind the 2026, 1992, 2014, and 2006 races. Mears would later joke about watching the race over and over "to see if this time I get around Gordy." Johncock, years later during a live interview on ABC, offered that if the dramatic duel had occurred two or three years later—when Mears had additional experience—the Californian would probably have pulled off the winning pass.

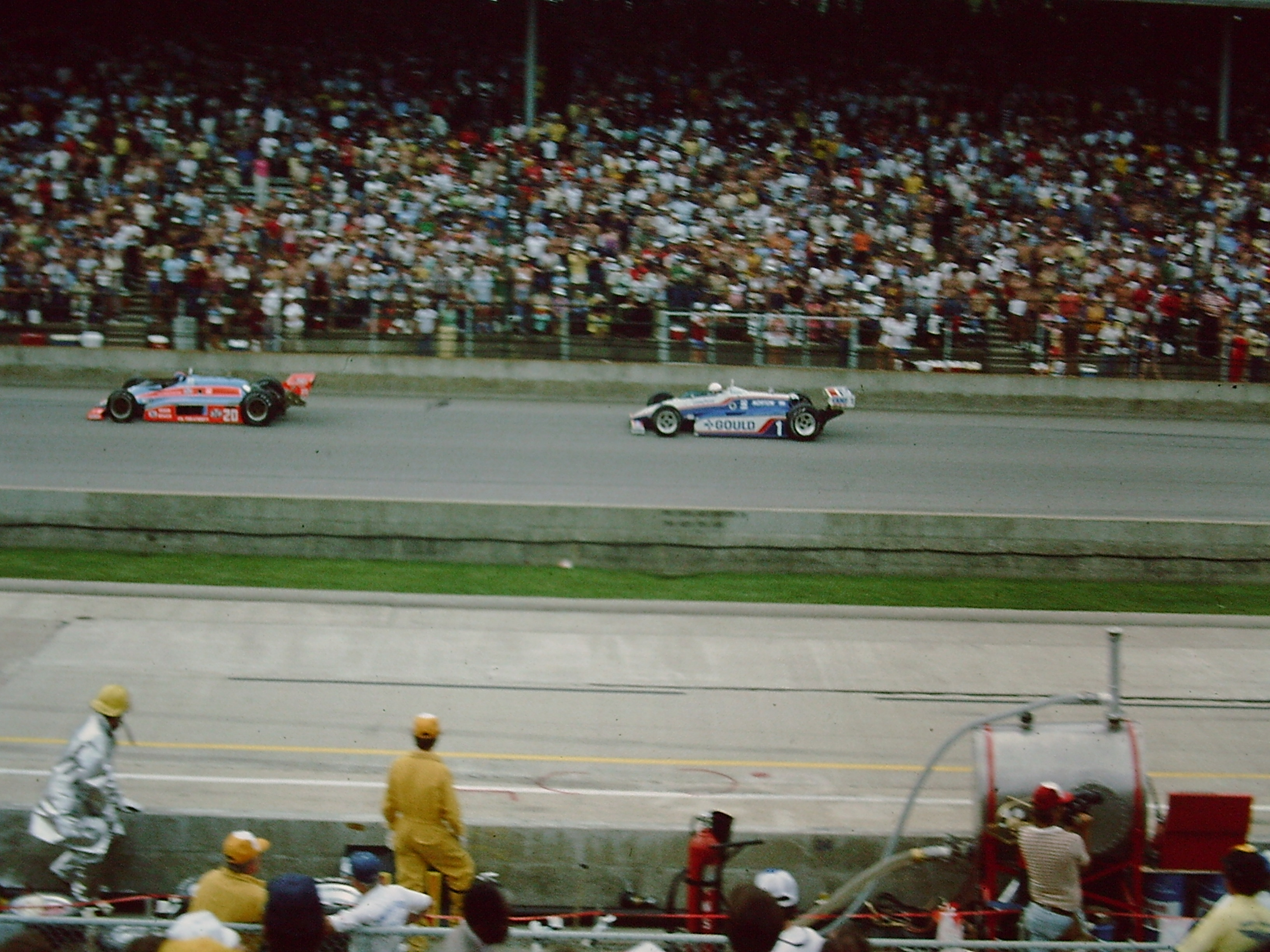
Johncock leads Rick Mears in the closing stages of the 1982 Indianapolis 500.

Johncock took another three Indycar races, including the 1982 Michigan 500 to complete two legs of what was then known as the Triple Crown (Indianapolis, Michigan, and Pocono).

Johncock's last Indycar win was in the opening round of the 1983 CART PPG Indy Car World Series at the Atlanta Motor Speedway driving a Cosworth powered Patrick Wildcat. Johncock, who started third on the grid, won the 200 mile, 132 lap race running an average of 146.133 mph from the Penske-Cosworth of Al Unser and John Paul Jr. in a 1982 model Penske-Cosworth. Later in the 1983 season, Johncock suffered a broken left leg and broken right ankle in an accident while competing at Michigan International Speedway, which sidelined him for the remainder of the season.

He retired from full-time racing in 1985, but returned for occasional appearances in 1987, 1988, 1989, 1991. His final race start was the 1992 Indianapolis 500, after which he retired for good.

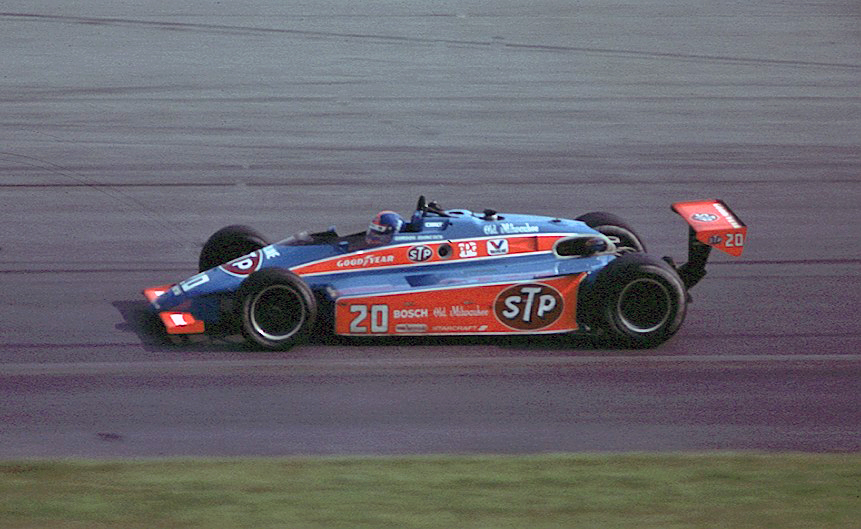
Johncock at Pocono in 1984.

Johncock competed in 21 NASCAR Winston Cup Series events in his career. He earned three top-fives and four top-tens in his limited schedule. The best of those finishes were a pair of fourths in 1973 at Daytona and in 1966 at Rockingham.

=== First retirement ===
Johncock abruptly retired from IndyCar racing during the first week of practice for the 1985 Indianapolis 500. He served on the IMS Radio Network in 1985, but decided to return to racing in 1986. He planned to enter the 1986 Indianapolis 500, but his funding fell through. He ended up sitting out the race. He attempted another return in 1987. During the first week of time trials, Jim Crawford suffered serious injuries to his feet. Johncock was hired to drive in place of Crawford and qualified for the race.

=== Second retirement ===
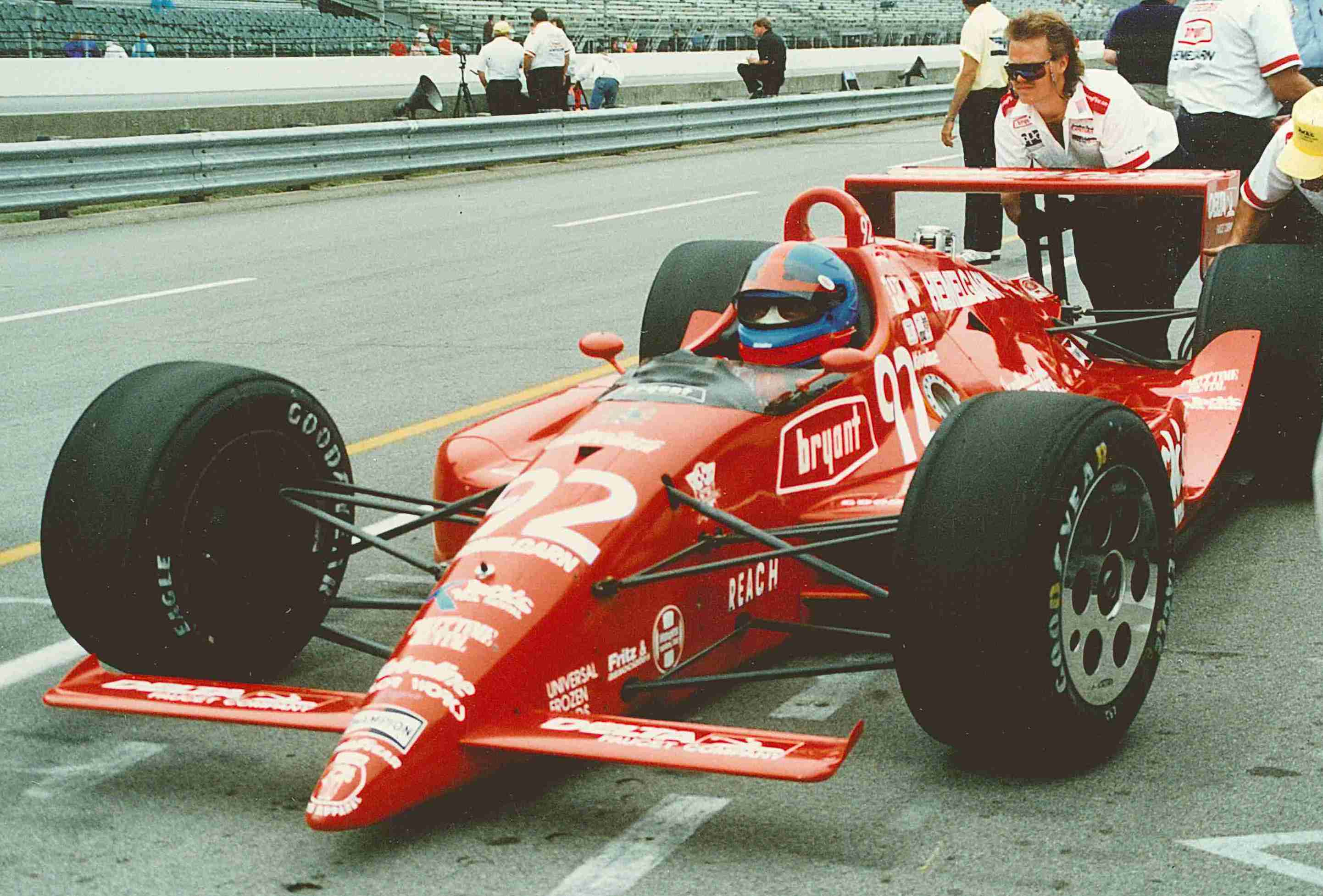
Johncock during practice for the 1991 Indianapolis 500

Johncock completed a sixth-place finish in the 1991 Indianapolis 500, despite having flu-like symptoms the morning of the race. His final race was the 1992 Indianapolis 500, where he dropped out of the race with engine failure.

After his retirement, Johncock distanced himself from motorsports, and instead focused on his timber business in Michigan. He participated in a 2004 interview on ESPN Classic's "Big Ticket" review of the 1982 Indy 500.

In the interview, he admitted that his interest in racing was now limited, and was no longer his daily focus. In discussing the 1973 race, Johncock appeared to have made peace with the circumstances of the miserable memories that were associated with the rain-shortened race, while insisting that his car was undoubtedly the fastest on the track, led easily, but unfortunately was not in front at the time the red flag appeared.

He chose not to attend the 2011 Indianapolis 500, which celebrated the 100th anniversary of the first race, despite the fact that all living former participants, and particularly living former winners, were invited. A year later, Speedway officials again invited him to attend the 2012 Indianapolis 500, and this time he did return to the Speedway and participated in the pre-race festivities.

During the lead up to the 2023 Indianapolis 500, officials from Borg-Warner invited Johncock back to Indianapolis in celebration of the 50th anniversary of his 1973 win. Johncock and his extended family took a ceremonial lap around the Speedway in a tour bus. After stopping off for pictures at the Yard of Bricks, Johncock got into the driver's seat of the bus and took his family for an impromptu second, and final lap around the track.

== Personal life and death ==
Johncock married multiple times, with two failed marriages already by 1982. His longest marriage was to Suzanne Johncock, to whom he was married from 1990 until his death. Johncock had five children, all from his first marriage.

After his permanent retirement from motorsport, Johncock opened a sawmill, and actively worked well into his 80s. Johncock remarked that the work kept him active. Johncock distanced himself from motorsport after his retirement, stating "I have no interest in going back. That was my job years ago. Now, I have a different job. To me, racing was a job".

Johncock died at his home in South Branch, Michigan, on September 28, 2026, at the age of 90.

== Awards ==
- Michigan Motorsports Hall of Fame, 1985
- Indianapolis Motor Speedway Hall of Fame, 1997
- International Motorsports Hall of Fame, 1999
- Grand Rapids Sports Hall of Fame, Grand Rapids, Michigan, 2000
- Motorsports Hall of Fame of America, 2002
- United States Auto Club Hall of Fame, 2025

== Motorsports career results ==
=== American open-wheel racing ===
(key) (Races in bold indicate pole position)

==== USAC Championship Car ====
USAC Championship Car results
Year	Team	Chassis	Engine	1	2	3	4	5	6	7	8	9	10	11	12	13	14	15	16	17	18	19	20	21	22	23	24	25	26	27	28	Pos.	Pts
1964	Frank Curtis	Curtis 64 FE	Offenhauser	PHX	TRE	INDY	MIL	LAN	TRE; Wth																							40th	60
1964	Weinberger & Welseck Enterprises	Blum 62 D	Offenhauser							ISF; 18	MIL; 21	DSF; DNQ	INF; 14	TRE	SAC	PHX; 10																40th	60
1965	Weinberger & Welseck Enterprises	Watson 62 FE	Offenhauser	PHX; 17		INDY; 5	MIL; 7	LAN; 10	PPR		IRP; 8	ATL; 6	**LAN**; 3	MIL; 15																		5th	1540
1965	Weinberger & Welseck Enterprises	Blum 62 D	Offenhauser		TRE; 8										ISF; 11		DSF; 10	INF; DNQ														5th	1540
1965	Pete Salemi	Gerhardt 65	Offenhauser							TRE; 23																						5th	1540
1965	Weinberger & Welseck Enterprises	Gerhardt 65	Offenhauser													MIL; 1			TRE; 14	SAC	PHX; 21											5th	1540
1966	Weinberger & Welseck Enterprises	Gerhardt 65	Offy 252 ci	PHX; 9	TRE; 2																											3rd	2050
1966	Weinberger & Welseck Enterprises	Gerhardt 66	Ford 255 ci V8			INDY; 4		LAN; 19	ATL; 3	PPR	IRP; 5	LAN; 2	ISF	MIL; 2	DSF	INF	TRE; 12	SAC	PHX; DNS													3rd	2050
1966	Weinberger & Welseck Enterprises	Gerhardt 66	Offy 252 ci				MIL; DNS																									3rd	2050
1967	Johncock Racing Team	Gerhardt 67	Ford 255 ci V8	PHX; 3	TRE; 20	INDY; 12	**MIL**; 1	LAN; 4	PPR	MOS; 3	MOS; 3	IRP; 6	**LAN**; 2	MTR; 7	MTR; 4	ISF	MIL; 4	DSF	INF	TRE; 2	SAC	HAN; 1		RSD; 26								4th	2700
1967	Johncock Racing Team	Gerhardt 67	Offy 159 ci t																				PHX; 4									4th	2700
1968	Johncock Racing Team	Gerhardt 66	Offy 159 ci t	HAN; 1			TRE; 4																									12th	1257
1968	Johncock Racing Team	Gerhardt 67	Ford 255 ci V8		LVS; 7	PHX; 18																										12th	1257
1968	Johncock Racing Team	Gerhardt 68	Offy 159 ci t					INDY; 27	MIL; 12			**LAN**; 1	PPR					**LAN**; 21	LAN									MCH; DNS		PHX; 7		12th	1257
1968	Johncock Racing Team	Eagle 68	Ford 255 ci V8							MOS; 13	MOS			CDR; 25	NAZ					MTR; 15	MTR	ISF									RSD; 11	12th	1257
1968	Johncock Racing Team	Gerhardt 68	Ford 255 ci V8													IRP; 5	IRP; 16															12th	1257
1968	Johncock Racing Team	Eagle 68	Offy 159 ci t																				MIL; 15	DSF	INF	TRE; 19	SAC		HAN; DNS			12th	1257
1969	Johncock Racing Team	Gerhardt 67	Offy 159 ci t	PHX; 10	HAN; 3																											5th	2070
1969	Johncock Racing Team	Gerhardt 68	Offy 159 ci t			INDY; 19	MIL; 8					TRE; 4			MIL; 19	ISF	DOV; 2	DSF	INF			TRE; 6	SAC	SIR	SIR							5th	2070
1969	Johncock Racing Team	Eagle 68	Offy 159 ci t					LAN; 20	PPR																	PHX; 10						5th	2070
1969	Johncock Racing Team	Eagle 68	Ford 255 ci V8							CDR; 1	NAZ									BRN; 1	**BRN**; 2											5th	2070
1969	Johncock Racing Team	Gerhardt 68	Ford 255 ci V8										IRP; 10	IRP; 14																		5th	2070
1969	Johncock Racing Team	Gerhardt 68	Chevrolet 320 ci V8																								RSD; 9					5th	2070
1970	Johncock Racing Team	Gerhardt 68	Offy 159 ci t	PHX; 18		TRE; 15	INDY; 28																									7th	1160
1970	Johncock Racing Team	Eagle 68	Ford 255 ci V8		SON; 4					CDR; 7		IRP; 3	ISF	MIL																		7th	1160
1970	Johncock Racing Team	McLaren M15A	Offy 159 ci t					MIL; 12	LAN; 10		MCH; 12				ONT; 4	DSF	INF	SED	TRE; DNQ	SAC	PHX											7th	1160
1971	Vollstedt Enterprises	Vollstedt 67	Ford 159ci V8t	RAF; 9	RAF; 10	PHX; 8	TRE; 15		MIL; 10																							27th	225
1971	Vollstedt Enterprises	McLaren M15A	Offy 159 ci t					INDY; 29		POC; 20	MCH; 23	MIL; 25																				27th	225
1971	Team McLaren	McLaren M16A	Offy 159 ci t										ONT; 27	TRE	PHX																	27th	225
1972	Team McLaren	McLaren M16A	Offy 159 ci t	PHX	TRE; 3																											21st	360
1972	Team McLaren	McLaren M16B	Offy 159 ci t			INDY; 20	MIL	MCH; 9	POC; 22		ONT; 13	TRE; 20	PHX																			21st	360
1972	Roger Penske Enterprises	McLaren M16B	Offy 159 ci t							MIL; 22																						21st	360
1973	Patrick Racing	Eagle 72	Offy 159 ci t	TWS; 23	**TRE**; 2	TRE; 21	INDY; 1	MIL; 18	POC; 14																							7th	2240
1973	Patrick Racing	Eagle 73	Offy 159 ci t							MCH; 9	MIL; 17	**ONT**; 5	ONT	ONT; 32	**MCH**; 17	MCH	**TRE**; 1	TWS; 7	**PHX**; 1													7th	2240
1974	Patrick Racing	Eagle 74	Offy 159 ci t	ONT; 14	ONT	ONT; 26	PHX; 4	TRE; 2			POC; 3	MCH; 3	MIL; 1	MCH; 14	TRE; 11	TRE; 2	PHX; 1															3rd	3050
1974	Patrick Racing	Eagle 73	Offy 159 ci t						INDY; 4	MIL; 16																						3rd	3050
1975	Patrick Racing	Wildcat Mk 1	DGS 158 ci t	ONT; 5	ONT	ONT; 15			INDY; 31	MIL; 14	**POC**; 20	MCH; 11	MIL; 2	MCH; 6	TRE; 1	**PHX**; 23																10th	1280
1975	Patrick Racing	Eagle 74	Offy 159 ci t				**PHX**; 2	TRE; 10																								10th	1280
1976	Patrick Racing	Wildcat Mk 2	DGS 158 ci t	PHX; 3	TRE; 2	INDY; 3		POC; 27	MCH; 1	TWS; 5			ONT; 3	MCH; 2	TWS; 2	PHX; 2																1st	4240
1976	Patrick Racing	Wildcat Mk 1	DGS 158 ci t				**MIL**; 2				TRE; 1	MIL; 2																				1st	4240
1977	Patrick Racing	Wildcat Mk 2	DGS 158 ci t	ONT; 5	PHX; 12	TWS; 9	TRE; 2	INDY; 11	MIL; 12	POC; 3		MCH; 2	TWS; 2		ONT; 11	MCH; 1	PHX; 1															5th	2830
1977	Patrick Racing	Wildcat Mk 3	DGS 158 ci t								MOS; 18			MIL; 10																		5th	2830
1978	Patrick Racing	Wildcat Mk 2	DGS 158 ci t	PHX; 1	ONT; 19	TWS; 3	TRE; 1	INDY; 3		MIL; 22	POC; 14	MCH; 19	ATL; 7	TWS; 7	MIL; 3	ONT; 3	MCH; 3	TRE; 14			PHX; 3											3rd	3548
1978	Patrick Racing	Wildcat Mk 4	Drake DT 160 V8						MOS; DNS																							3rd	3548
1978	Patrick Racing	Wildcat Mk 3	DGS 158 ci t																SIL; 4	BRH; 11												3rd	3548
1979	Patrick Racing	Penske PC-6	Cosworth DFX V8t	ONT	TWS	INDY; 6	MIL	POC	TWS	MIL																						NC	0
1980	Patrick Racing	Wildcat Mk 6	Cosworth DFX V8t	ONT; 3																												4th	1330
1980	Patrick Racing	Penske PC-6	Cosworth DFX V8t		INDY; 4																											4th	1330
1980	Patrick Racing	Phoenix 80	Cosworth DFX V8t			**MIL**; 3	POC; DNS	MDO; 2																								4th	1330
1981-82	Patrick Racing	Wildcat MK8	Cosworth DFX V8t	INDY; 9	POC	ISF	DSF	INF																								5th	1000
1981-82	Patrick Racing	Wildcat 8B	Cosworth DFX V8t						INDY; 1																							5th	1000
1982-83	Patrick Racing	Wildcat IX	Cosworth DFX V8t	ISF	DSF	NAZ	INDY; 14																									22nd	25
1983-84	Patrick Racing	March 84C	Cosworth DFX V8t	DSF	INDY; 25																											29th	10

==== PPG Indy Car World Series ====
PPG Indy Car World Series results
Year	Team	Chassis	Engine	1	2	3	4	5	6	7	8	9	10	11	12	13	14	15	16	17	Pos.	Pts	Ref
1979	Patrick Racing	Penske PC-6	Cosworth DFX V8t	PHX; 1	ATL; 4	ATL; 9	INDY; 6	**TRE**; 3	TRE; 5	MCH; 1	**MCH**; 4	WGL; 3	TRE; 16	ONT; 15	MCH; 13	ATL; 2	PHX; 4				3rd	2211	
1980	Patrick Racing	Wildcat Mk6	Cosworth DFX V8t	ONT; 3					MCH; 5												6th	1572	
1980	Patrick Racing	Penske PC-6	Cosworth DFX V8t		INDY; 4																6th	1572	
1980	Patrick Racing	Phoenix 80	Cosworth DFX V8t			**MIL**; 3	POC; DNS	MDO; 2		WGL; 21	MIL; 23	ONT; 23	MCH; 24	MEX; 19	PHX; 24						6th	1572	
1981	Patrick Racing	Wildcat MK8	Cosworth DFX V8t	PHX; 6	**MIL**; 16	ATL; 4	ATL; 4	MCH; 36	RIV; 2	MIL; 6	MCH; 5	WGL; 10	MEX; 3	PHX; 3							4th	142	
1982	Patrick Racing	Wildcat 8B	Cosworth DFX V8t	PHX; 5	ATL; 2	**MIL**; 1	CLE; 5	MCH; 1	MIL; 11	POC; 6	RIV; 26	ROA; 22	MCH; 15	PHX; 23							4th	186	
1983	Patrick Racing	Wildcat IX	Cosworth DFX V8t	ATL; 1	INDY; 14																16th	20	
1983	Patrick Racing	March 83C	Cosworth DFX V8t			MIL; 23	CLE; 26	MCH; 26	ROA	POC	RIV	MDO	MCH	CPL	LAG	PHX					16th	20	
1984	Patrick Racing	Wildcat MkX	Cosworth DFX V8t	LBH; 11																	14th	39	
1984	Patrick Racing	March 84C	Cosworth DFX V8t		PHX; 10	INDY; 25	MIL; 6	POR; 9	MEA; 12	CLE; 18	MCH; 4	ROA; 9	POC; 11	MDO; 10	SAN; 17	MCH; DNQ	PHX; 13	LAG	CPL; DNS		14th	39	
1985	Patrick Racing	March 85C	Cosworth DFX V8t	LBH	INDY; Wth^{1}	MIL	POR	MEA	CLE	MCH	ROA	POC	MDO	SAN	MCH	LAG	PHX	MIA			NA	-	
1987	Patrick Racing	March 86C	Buick 3300 V6t	LBH	PHX	INDY; 22	MIL	POR	MEA	CLE	TOR	MCH	POC	ROA	MDO	NAZ	LAG	MIA			NC	0	
1988	Royal Motor Racing	Lola T87/00	Buick 3300 V6t	PHX	LBH	INDY; DNQ	MIL	POR	CLE	TOR	MEA										21st	16	
1988	Hemelgarn Racing	Lola T88/00	Buick 3300 V6t									MCH; 6	POC; 6	MDO	ROA	NAZ	LAG	MIA			21st	16	
1989	Hemelgarn Racing	Lola T88/00	Buick 3300 V6t	PHX	LBH	INDY; 31	MIL	DET	POR	CLE	MEA	TOR									NC	0	
1989	Hemelgarn Racing	Lola T89/00	Judd AV										MCH; 21	POC; 15	MDO	ROA	NAZ	LAG			NC	0	
1991	Hemelgarn Racing	Lola T90/00	Cosworth DFS V8t	SRF	LBH	PHX	INDY; 6	MIL	DET	POR	CLE	MEA	TOR	MCH	DEN	VAN	MDO	ROA	NAZ	LAG	20th	8	
1992	Hemelgarn Racing	Lola T91/00	Buick 3300 V6t	SRF	PHX	LBH	INDY; 29	DET	POR	MIL	NHA	TOR	MCH	CLE	ROA	VAN	MDO	NAZ	LAG		NC	0	

^{1} Johncock was listed as the primary entry and participated in practice; prior to qualifying, Johncock announced he was withdrawing, and announced a retirement from driving.

===== Indianapolis 500 =====
Year	Chassis	Engine	Start	Finish	Team
1965	Watson	Offenhauser	14	5	Weinberger & Welseck Enterprises
1966	Gerhardt	Ford	6	4	Weinberger & Welseck Enterprises
1967	Gerhardt	Ford	3	12	Johncock Racing Team
1968	Gerhardt	Offenhauser	9	27	Johncock Racing Team
1969	Gerhardt	Offenhauser	5	19	Johncock Racing Team
1970	Gerhardt	Offenhauser	17	28	Johncock Racing Team
1971	McLaren	Offenhauser	12	29	Vollstedt Enterprises
1972	McLaren	Offenhauser	26	20	Team McLaren
1973	Eagle	Offenhauser	11	**1**	Patrick Racing
1974	Eagle	Offenhauser	4	4	Patrick Racing
1975	Wildcat	DGS	2	31	Patrick Racing
1976	Wildcat	DGS	2	3	Patrick Racing
1977	Wildcat	DGS	5	11	Patrick Racing
1978	Wildcat	DGS	6	3	Patrick Racing
1979	Penske	Cosworth	5	6	Patrick Racing
1980	Penske	Cosworth	17	4	Patrick Racing
1981	Wildcat	Cosworth	17	9	Patrick Racing
1982	Wildcat	Cosworth	5	**1**	Patrick Racing
1983	Wildcat	Cosworth	10	14	Patrick Racing
1984	March	Cosworth	5	25	Patrick Racing
1985	March	Cosworth	Wth		Patrick Racing
1987	March	Buick	18	22	Patrick Racing
1988	Lola	Buick	DNQ		Royal Motor Racing
1989	Lola	Buick	23	31	Hemelgarn Racing
1991	Lola	Cosworth	33	6	Hemelgarn Racing
1992	Lola	Buick	30	29	Hemelgarn Racing

=== NASCAR ===
(key) (Bold – Pole position awarded by qualifying time. Italics – Pole position earned by points standings or practice time. * – Most laps led.)

==== Grand National Series ====
NASCAR Grand National Series results
Year	Team	No.	Make	1	2	3	4	5	6	7	8	9	10	11	12	13	14	15	16	17	18	19	20	21	22	23	24	25	26	27	28	29	30	31	32	33	34	35	36	37	38	39	40	41	42	43	44	45	46	47	48	49	NGNC	Pts	Ref
1966	K&K Insurance Racing	71	Dodge	AUG	RSD	DAY; 7	DAY	DAY; 29	CAR	BRI	ATL; 19	HCY	CLB	GPS	BGS	NWS	MAR	DAR	LGY	MGR	MON	RCH	CLT	DTS	ASH	PIF	SMR	AWS	BLV	GPS	DAY	ODS	BRR	OXF	FON	ISP	BRI	SMR	NSV	ATL	CLB	AWS	BLV	BGS	DAR	HCY	RCH	HBO	MAR	NWS			NA	-	
1966	Junior Johnson & Associates	26	Ford																																																CLT; 4	CAR; 27	NA	-	
1967	R.L. Diestler	85	Plymouth	AUG	RSD; 43	DAY	DAY; 11	DAY; 30	AWS	BRI	GPS	BGS																																									NA	-	
1967	R.L. Diestler	85	Ford										ATL; 41	CLB	HCY	NWS	MAR	SVH	RCH	DAR	BLV	LGY	CLT	ASH	MGR	SMR	BIR	CAR	GPS	MGY	DAY	TRN	OXF	FDA	ISP	BRI	SMR	NSV	ATL	BGS	CLB	SVH	DAR	HCY	RCH	BLV	HBO	MAR	NWS				NA	-	
1967	Bud Moore Engineering	16	Mercury																																															CLT; 42	CAR; 5	AWS	NA	-	
1968	Lyle Stelter	55	Ford	MGR	MGY	RSD	DAY; DNQ	BRI	RCH	ATL	HCY	GPS	CLB	NWS	MAR	AUG	AWS	DAR	BLV	LGY	CLT	ASH	MGR	SMR	BIR	CAR	GPS	DAY	ISP	OXF	FDA	TRN	BRI	SMR	NSV	ATL	CLB	BGS	AWS	SBO	LGY	DAR	HCY	RCH	BLV	HBO	MAR	NWS	AUG	CLT	CAR	JFC	NA	-	

==== Winston Cup Series ====
NASCAR Winston Cup Series results
Year	Team	No.	Make	1	2	3	4	5	6	7	8	9	10	11	12	13	14	15	16	17	18	19	20	21	22	23	24	25	26	27	28	29	30	31	NWCC	Pts	Ref
1972	Crawford Racing	22	Plymouth	RSD	DAY	RCH	ONT	CAR	ATL	BRI	DAR	NWS	MAR	TAL	CLT	DOV	MCH	RSD	TWS	DAY	BRI	TRN	ATL	TAL	MCH	NSV	DAR	RCH	DOV	MAR	NWS	CLT; 42	CAR	TWS; 35	NA	-	
1973	Ellington Racing	28	Chevy	RSD	DAY; 38	RCH	CAR; 25	BRI	ATL; 11	NWS	DAR	MAR	TAL; 38	NSV	CLT	DOV	TWS	RSD	MCH	DAY; 4	BRI	ATL	TAL	NSV	DAR	RCH	DOV	NWS	MAR	CLT	CAR; 25				NA	-	
1975	Ellington Racing	28	Chevy	RSD	DAY	RCH	CAR	BRI	ATL	NWS	DAR	MAR	TAL; 36	NSV	DOV	CLT	RSD	MCH	DAY	NSV	POC	TAL	MCH	DAR	DOV	NWS	MAR	CLT	RCH	CAR	BRI	ATL	ONT		NA	-	
1976	K&K Insurance Racing	17	Dodge	RSD	DAY	CAR	RCH	BRI	ATL	NWS	DAR	MAR	TAL	NSV	DOV	CLT	RSD	MCH	DAY	NSV	POC	TAL	MCH	BRI	DAR	RCH	DOV	MAR	NWS	CLT; 39	CAR	ATL	ONT		NA	-	

===== Daytona 500 =====
Year	Team	Manufacturer	Start	Finish
1966	K&K Insurance Racing	Dodge	13	29
1967	R.L. Diestler	Plymouth	22	30
1968	Lyle Stelter	Ford	DNQ	
1973	Ellington Racing	Chevrolet	5	38

=== International Race of Champions ===
(key) (Bold – Pole position. * – Most laps led.)

International Race of Champions results
Season	Make	Q1	Q2	Q3	1	2	3	4	Pos.	Pts	Ref
1973–74	Porsche				RSD; 10	RSD; 9	RSD; 11	DAY	11th	-	
1976–77	Chevy				MCH; 7	RSD; 10	RSD; 10	DAY	11th	-	
1977–78	Chevy				MCH; 6	**RSD**; 3	RSD; 10	DAY; 3	6th	-	
1978–79	Chevy	MCH	MCH; 3	RSD	**RSD**; 6*	ATL; 6			6th	-	
1979–80	Chevy	MCH	MCH; 1	RSD	RSD; 5	ATL; 4			4th	26	
1984	Chevy				MCH; 3	CLE; 3	TAL; 7	MCH; 5	5th	45	

== Sources ==
- Kallmann, Dave (1998). "Looking back: Tragedy of '73 burns in Indy history". Milwaukee Journal-Sentinel. Archived from the original on March 7, 2005.
- Moses, Sam (June 7, 1982). "Wee Gordy wins big". Sports Illustrated. Archived from the original on January 16, 2004.
- Greatest 33 Profile Article

Achievements
Preceded by Mark Donohue	Indianapolis 500 Winner; 1973	Succeeded by Johnny Rutherford
Preceded by Bobby Unser	Indianapolis 500 Winner; 1982	Succeeded by Tom Sneva
