= Lola T150 =

Racing car designed and built by Reynard Racing Cars

Lola T150 Lola T152 Lola T153
- Category: USAC IndyCar
- Constructor: Lola
- Predecessor: Lola T90
- Successor: Lola T270

Technical specifications
- Engine: Ford (1968, 1970); Offenhauser (1969) 159 cu in (2.6 L) V8 /I4 mid-engined
- Transmission: Hewland L.G.500 4-speed manual
- Weight: 1,400 lb (640 kg)
- Fuel: Methanol
- Tyres: Goodyear

Competition history
- Notable drivers: (United States) Al Unser (United States) Mark Donohue
- Debut: 1968 California 200
Entries	Wins
45	9

The Lola T150, and its derivatives, the T152 and T153, were open-wheel racing car chassis, designed and built by Lola Cars to compete in USAC IndyCar racing series, between 1968 and 1970. The T150 and T153 were powered by the 159 cu in (2.61 L) 780–900 hp (580–670 kW) Ford Indy V-8 turbo engine; while the T152 chassis used a 159 cu in (2.61 L) 900 hp (670 kW) Offenhauser 4-cylinder turbo engine. Both the T150 and T152 used a unique four-wheel-drive system, which would be banned after the 1969 season. The T153 only used a conventional two-wheel-drive (rear-wheel-drive setup. The different chassis would, over the span of three years, win a total of 9 races, all while being driven by Al Unser.
