= Colt 70 =

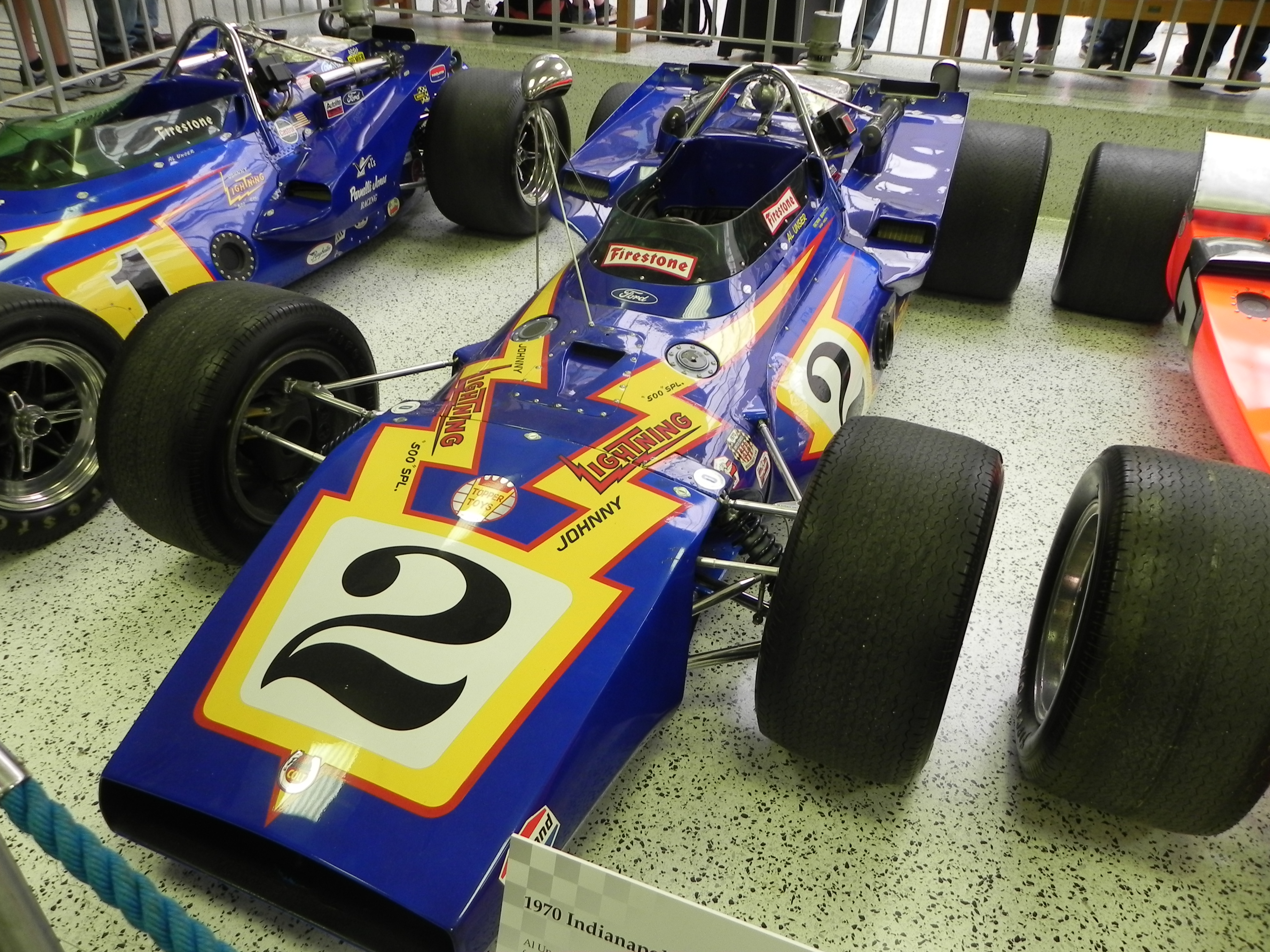
- Category: USAC IndyCar

Technical specifications
- Engine: Ford 159–255 cu in (2.6–4.2 L) TC/NA DOHC V8 mid-engined
- Transmission: Hewland L.G.500 4-speed manual
- Weight: 1,400 lb (640 kg)
- Fuel: Methanol
- Tyres: Firestone

Competition history
- Notable entrants: Vel's Parnelli Jones Racing
- Notable drivers: (United States) Al Unser
- Debut: 1970 Phoenix 150
Wins	Poles
10	8

The Colt 70 was an open-wheel race car, based on the Lola T150, designed for USAC IndyCar racing, specifically the 1970 season. It was driven by Al Unser, and successfully won the Indianapolis 500 that year.
