= Brabham BT32 =

The Brabham BT32 was an open-wheel racing car, that competed in the USAC Championship Car racing, between 1970 and 1972 USAC Championships. In that time, it was driven by Jack Brabham, Bud Tingelstad, Johnny Rutherford, LeeRoy Yarbrough, and Swede Savage. Its best result in qualification was third-place (Johnny Rutherford at Phoenix in 1972), and its best race result was an 7th-place finish, being driven by Bud Tingelstad at the prestigious 1971 Indianapolis 500. It was powered by an 159 cu in (2.61 L) Offenhauser turbocharged four-cylinder engine, developing between 770–820 hp (570–610 kW).
