= Mark Donohue =

American racing driver (1937–1975)

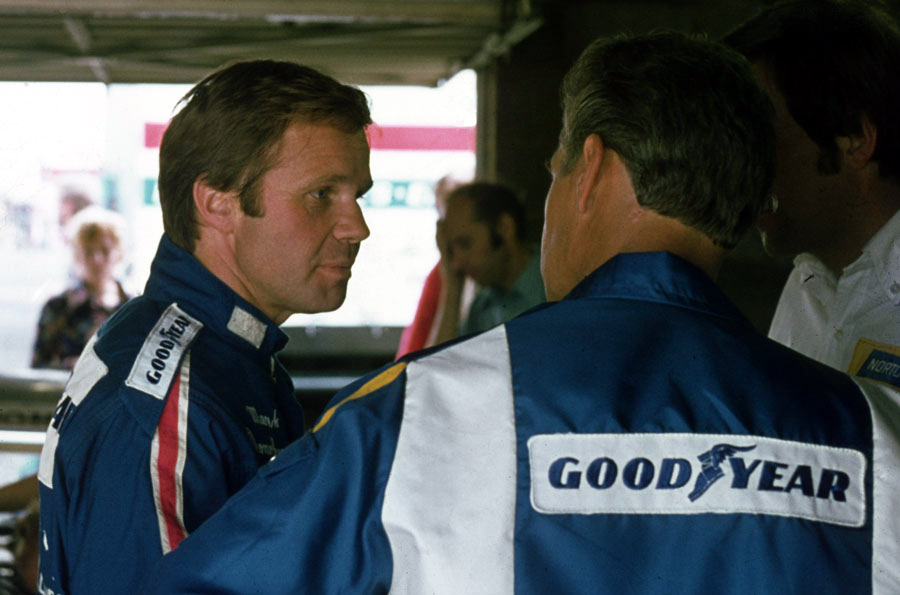
- Donohue at the 1975 British Grand Prix
- Born: Mark Neary Donohue Jr. March 18, 1937 Haddon Township, New Jersey, U.S.
- Died: August 19, 1975 (aged 38) Graz, Austria
- Relatives: David Donohue (son)

Championship titles
- SCCA/CASC Can-Am (1973); Major victories 24 Hours of Daytona (1969); Pocono 500 (1971); Indianapolis 500 (1972)

Champ Car career
- 29 races run over 6 years
- Best finish: 5th (1972)
- First race: 1968 Telegraph Trophy 200 (Mosport)
- Last race: 1973 California 500 (Ontario)
- First win: 1971 Pocono 500 (Pocono)
- Last win: 1972 Indianapolis 500 (Indianapolis)
Wins	Podiums	Poles
3	7	4

Formula One World Championship career
- Nationality: (United States) American
- Active years: 1971, 1974–1975
- Team(s): Penske-entered McLaren and March chassis, Penske
- Entries: 16 (14 starts)
- Championships: 0
- Wins: 0
- Podiums: 1
- Career points: 8
- Pole positions: 0
- Fastest laps: 0
- First entry: 1971 Canadian Grand Prix
- Last entry: 1975 Austrian Grand Prix

NASCAR Cup Series career
- 6 races run over 2 years
- First race: 1972 Winston Western 500 (Riverside)
- Last race: 1973 Atlanta 500 (Atlanta)
- First win: 1973 Winston Western 500 (Riverside)
Wins	Top tens	Poles
1	1	0

24 Hours of Le Mans career
- Years: 1966–1967, 1971
- Teams: Holman-Moody, Shelby-Ford, NART-Penske
- Best finish: 4th (1967)
- Class wins: 0

Mark Neary Donohue Jr. (March 18, 1937 – August 19, 1975), nicknamed "Captain Nice", was an American race car driver and engineer known for his ability to develop and set up his race car as well as driving it, often to victory.

Donohue was the developer and driver of the 1500+ bhp "Can-Am Killer" Porsche 917-30. He won the 1972 Indianapolis 500. Cars that Donohue raced include: AMC Javelin, AMC Matador, Chevrolet Camaro, Eagle-Offy, Elva Courier, Ford GT40 MK IV, Ferrari 250LM, Ferrari 512, Lola T70, Lola T330, Lotus 20, McLaren M16, Porsche 911, Porsche 917/10, Porsche 917/30, Shelby Cobra, and Shelby Mustang GT350R.

== Early life ==
Born in Haddon Township, New Jersey, Donohue grew up in Summit, graduated from the Pingry School in Hillside, and entered Brown University in Providence, Rhode Island. At the age of 22 while a senior at Brown, Donohue began racing his 1957 Corvette. He won the first event he entered, a hillclimb in Belknap County, New Hampshire. He graduated from Brown in 1959 with a bachelor's degree in mechanical engineering.

Donohue won the SCCA national championship in an Elva Courier in 1961. Experienced race driver Walt Hansgen (who worked for Inskip Motors in New York & Rhode Island) recognized Donohue's ability and befriended him, eventually providing an MGB (through Inskip Motors in Providence, RI and prepped by their race shop Competition Engineering) for Donohue to race at the 1964 Bridgehampton 500-mile (800 km) SCCA endurance event, which he won. Hansgen arranged for Donohue to become his teammate in 1965, co-driving a Ferrari 275 at the 12 Hours of Sebring endurance race, which they finished in 11th place. That year, Donohue also won two divisional championships: in SCCA B Class in a GT350 and in SCCA Formula C in a Lotus 20B.

Donohue was hired on March 29, 1964, by Jack Griffith [Griffith Motors, Syosset, N.Y./Plainview, N.Y.] as design engineer for the Griffith, formerly TVR Grantura Mk III, powered by a Ford 289 cid (4.7l) V8 engine. He went on to assist TVR's David Hives in designing the Series 400 Griffith and then working on the ill-fated Bob Cumberford-designed, Intermeccanica-(Torino, Italy) produced Series 600 Griffith. During its production life, there were 192 Series 200 Griffiths built, 59 of the Series 400 and only ten of the Series 600. During his tenure at Griffith, he drove the Griffith-owned Shelby 289 Cobra making his mark on the SCCA circuit. In February of 1965, Donohue was named comptroller at Griffith Motors, but was soon lured from Griffith by Roger Penske early in 1966. The Griffith company went defunct in November, 1966.

== Ford GT40 ==
In 1966, thanks to his friendship with Hansgen, word quickly spread to the Ford Motor Company about the young driver. Ford signed Donohue to drive a MKII GT40 at the 24 Hours of Daytona in a deal made by Hangsen himself, and after bringing it to a third place finish, they later signed him to drive one of their GT-40 Mk II race cars campaigned at the 24 Hours of Le Mans by the Holman & Moody racing team. Le Mans proved frustrating for Donohue. Hansgen died while testing the GT40 in preparation for Le Mans so Donohue partnered with Australian Paul Hawkins. Donohue and Hawkins completed only twelve laps due to differential failure and finished 47th. Earlier that year, co-driving with Hansgen, Donohue finished third at the 24 Hours of Daytona and second at the 12 Hours of Sebring.

At Hansgen's funeral, Roger Penske spoke to Donohue about driving for him. In his first race for Penske, at Watkins Glen in June 1966, Donohue qualified well but crashed the car at the top of a hill, destroying it.

Donohue was invited back to Le Mans by Ford in 1967. Ford had developed a new GT, the Mark IV. Donohue co-drove in the No. 4 yellow car with sports car driver and race car builder Bruce McLaren for Shelby American Racing. The two drivers disagreed on many aspects of racing and car setup, but as a team were able to muster a fourth-place finish in the endurance classic.

== Joining With Penske ==
In 1967, Penske contacted Donohue about driving in the United States Road Racing Championship (USRRC). Driving Penske's Lola T70 MkIII Chevrolet, Donohue dominated the 1967 USRRC race series . Donohue drove in seven of the eight races; he won six (at Las Vegas, Riverside, Bridgehampton, Watkins Glen, Pacific Raceways, and Mid-Ohio), and In the seventh race at Laguna Seca, he finished third behind Lothar Motschenbacher and Mike Goth.

In 1968, Donohue and Penske returned to defend their USRRC championship with the McLaren M6A Chevrolet. Donohue did not start the first race of the year at Circuit Hermanos Rodriguez in Mexico City due to problems getting the engine to start. Despite this, Donohue still dominated the series, even though he suffered three DNFs during the season due to mechanical problems with the M6A.

In 1969, Donohue won the 24 Hours of Daytona driving the Penske Lola-Chevrolet T70.

== Trans-Am ==
Donohue began his Trans-Am series campaign in 1967, winning three of twelve races in a Roger Penske-owned Chevrolet Camaro. In 1967 and 1968, the Trans-Am schedule included two of the most prized endurance races in the world, the 24 Hours of Daytona and the 12 Hours of Sebring. Donohue finished fourth at Daytona and won the Trans-Am class at the 12 Hours of Sebring.

1968 was a banner year for Donohue in the Trans-Am series, as he successfully defended his 12 Hours of Sebring victory by partnering with Craig Fisher and driving his Penske Chevrolet Camaro to victory. Donohue won ten of 13 races, a Trans-Am series record which stood until Tommy Kendall won 11 of 13 races in the 1997 Trans-Am Series.

Donohue was a leading Trans-Am driver of the late 1960s and early 1970s driving Camaros in 1968 and 1969, and an AMC Javelin in 1971, for Roger Penske Racing.

During their enormous success in Trans-Am, Penske and Donohue began to experiment with their Camaros. They discovered that using a drag racing trick of dipping a car in an acid bath would eat away small amounts of metal, which in turn made the car incrementally lighter, and allowed it to be driven faster. The 1967 Z-28 won its last race by lapping the entire field of cars, causing suspicion throughout the paddock.

During a post-race inspection, race stewards discovered that the car was 250 pounds lighter than the 2,800-pound minimum weight requirement. Donohue was about to have his race victory taken away for cheating, but Roger Penske stepped in. Penske warned that any disqualification would have the potential of motivating Chevrolet to pull all support for the Trans-Am series. After considering the potential consequences, the race stewards allowed Donohue's victory to stand, but the rules for the 1968 season incorporated a change whereby all cars would be weighed during the technical inspection before the race.

Penske and Donohue did not stop acid-dipping after this, however. Continuing the practice of reducing weight allowed them to place weights of certain sizes strategically in specific locations within the car, thus helping to balance the car while being driven on the limit. Acid-dipping car bodies was prevalent with competing Trans-Am teams also.

They continued to use the "lightweight" car in 1968, at the Sebring 12-hour race. They changed the grille and taillight to the 1968 model, and then painted both cars identically. They sent the legal weight car through the technical inspection with the number 15 and again with the number 16 on it. Then they put both cars in the race, number 15 and 16, one car being 250 pounds lighter. They won their class in the race, finishing third overall, and went on to win ten out of 13 races that year.

They also acid-dipped the body on the Camaro and had to caution people not to lean against it, for fear it would dent. The lightweight car was featured on an episode of Dream Car Garage on Speed TV in 2005.

In 1970, new Javelin team owner Roger Penske and driver Mark Donohue breathed new life into the AMC team. Donohue drove the Javelin to three victories, with AMC finishing second overall in the Manufacturers' Championship. In 1971, of the ten races that the Over 2.5L Class cars participated in, Donohue won seven of them, including the final six races in a row, with AMC winning the Manufacturers' championship for the first time ever. In the final race of the season, Javelins finished in first, second and third place, with George Follmer becoming the only other Javelin driver to win besides Donohue.

== Indianapolis 500 ==
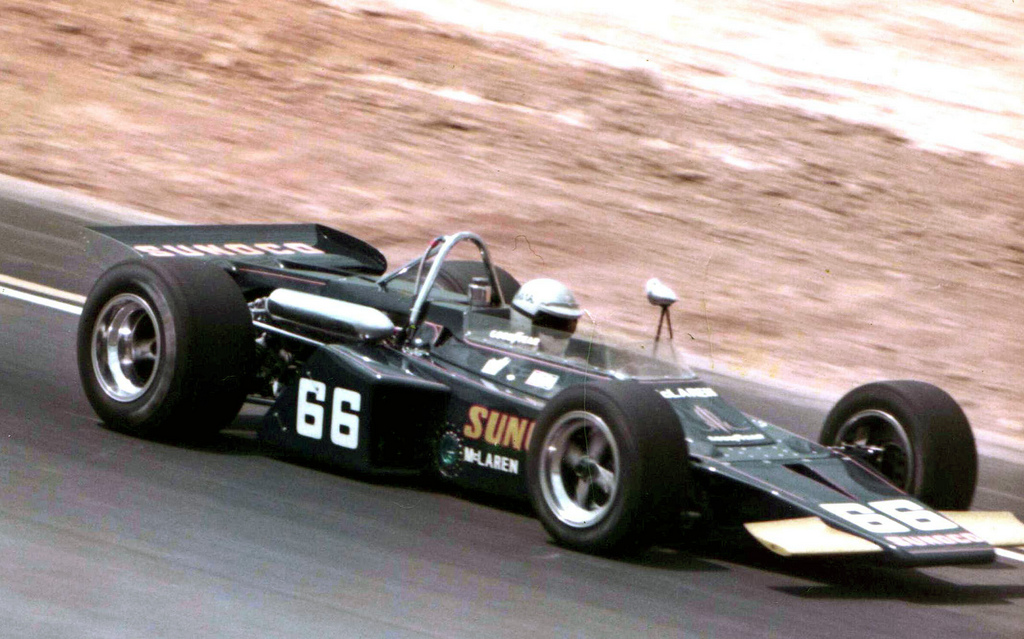
Donohue won the inaugural Pocono 500 in 1971

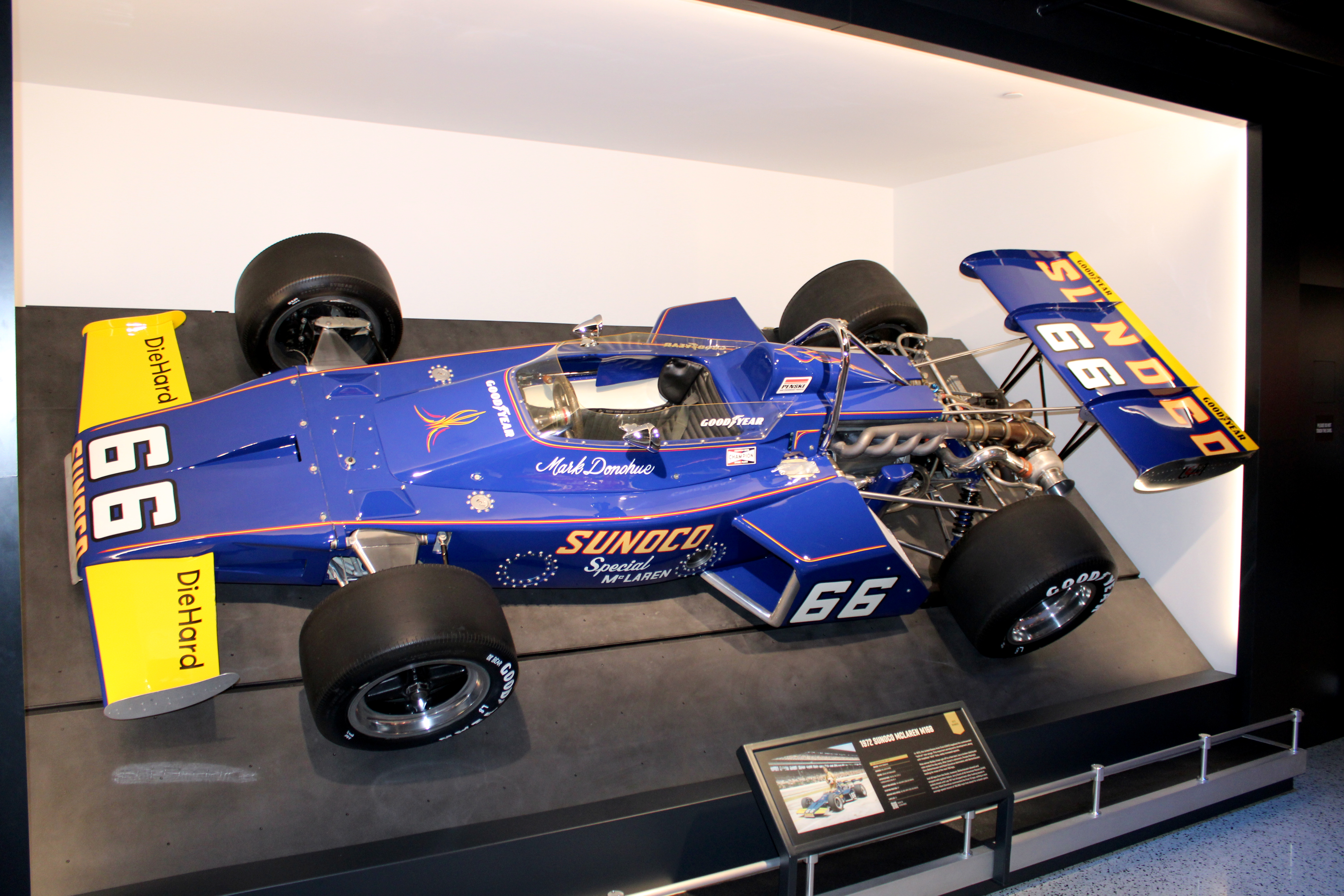
Mark Donohue's 1972 Sunoco McLaren M16B on display at the Indianapolis Motor Speedway Museum

In 1969, Penske and Donohue raced in their first Indianapolis 500, with Donohue finishing seventh, winning the rookie of the year award. Donohue raced at Indianapolis each year following, finishing second in 1970 and 25th in 1971.

Donohue won in 1972, driving for Penske. He finished the race in his McLaren-Offy setting a record speed of over 162 mph (261 km/h), which stood for twelve years. The victory was the first for Penske in the Indy 500.

== NASCAR ==
Donohue raced in several NASCAR Grand American races and a NASCAR pony car division from 1968 until 1971. In the 1972–1973 season, driving an AMC Matador for Penske Racing in NASCAR's top division, the Winston Cup Series, Donohue won the season-opening event at Riverside. That race was Penske's first NASCAR win in a long history of NASCAR participation. Although photographs of Donohue with the more aerodynamic 1974 Matador coupe exist and are published, he did not drive it in competition.

== Can-Am Porsche ==
Between 1971 and 1972, Penske Racing (along with Donohue as the primary test and development driver) was commissioned by Porsche to help develop the 917-10 to compete in the Can-Am series. During testing at Road Atlanta, Donohue recommended larger brake ducts, believing that more cooling would slow the brakes' degradation during a race.

The Porsche engineers obliged, but the new ducts interfered with the bodywork closure pins that attached body panels to the car. Coming out of turn seven at about 150 mph (240 km/h), the rear bodywork flew off the car, which became extremely unstable, lifted off the ground, and tumbled down the track. The front of the car was torn away, leaving Donohue, still strapped to his safety seat, with his legs dangling outside the car. Amazingly, Donohue only suffered an internal derangement of his knee with meniscus damage and limited cruciate plus collateral ligament damage. (He was operated on at Piedmont Hospital in Atlanta by Drs. J. Funk and J. L. Watts.) George Follmer, Donohue's old Trans-Am teammate, took over testing the 917-10 for Donohue, who said:

It just doesn't feel right. Seeing another man driving your car, a car you know so well. I imagine it must feel like watching another man in bed with your wife.

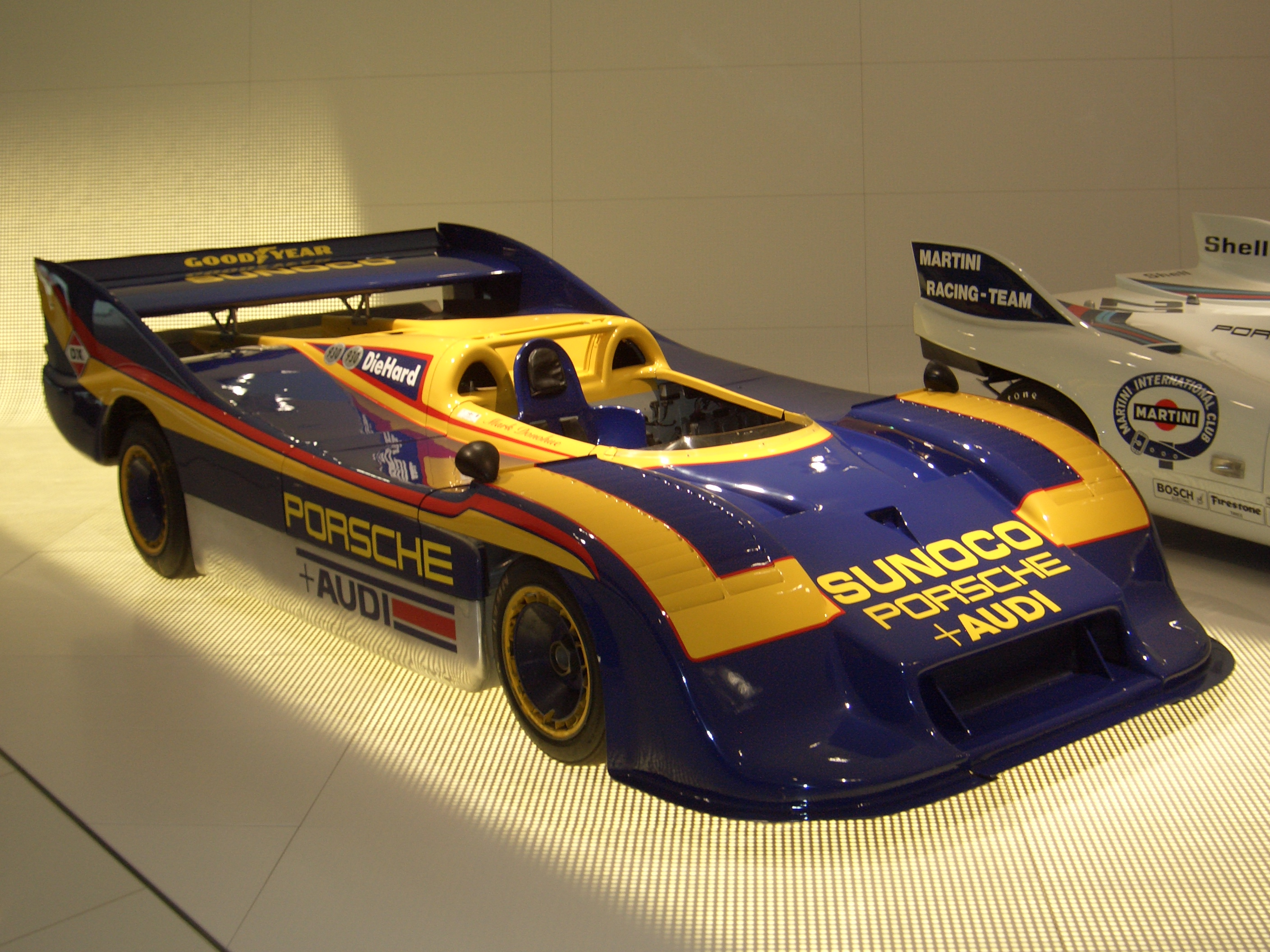
The "Can-Am killer", Porsche 917–30, on display at the Porsche Stuttgart-Zuffenhausen Museum, Germany

Porsche, Penske, and Donohue quickly started the development of the 917-30, complete with a reworked aerodynamic "Paris" body and a 5.4-liter turbocharged flat-12 engine whose output could be adjusted from about 1,100 to 1,500 bhp by turning a boost knob in the cockpit. During the development of this motor, the German Porsche engineers often asked Donohue if the motor finally had enough power. He answered, "It will never have enough power until I can spin the wheels at the end of the straightaway in high gear."

On August 9, 1975, Donohue drove the 917–30 to a world closed-course speed record at the Talladega Superspeedway in Talladega, Alabama. His average speed around the 2.66-mile (4.28 km) high-banked oval was 221.120 mph (355.858 km/h). Donohue held the record for 11 years, until it was broken by Rick Mears at Michigan International Speedway.

The 917-30 has been referred to as the "Can-Am killer" as it dominated the competition, winning all but two races of the 1973 Can-Am championship.

After the Arab oil embargo in 1973, the SCCA, IMSA and other race series imposed fuel limitations on motor sport racing as a whole. Allegedly this hampered the performance of the 917/30, making it uncompetitive in the Can-Am series. Brian Redman drove it once in 1974, and that was it for the car as far as Penske campaigning it. The 917/30 generally is considered one of the most powerful and most dominant racing machines ever created.

== First IROC champion ==
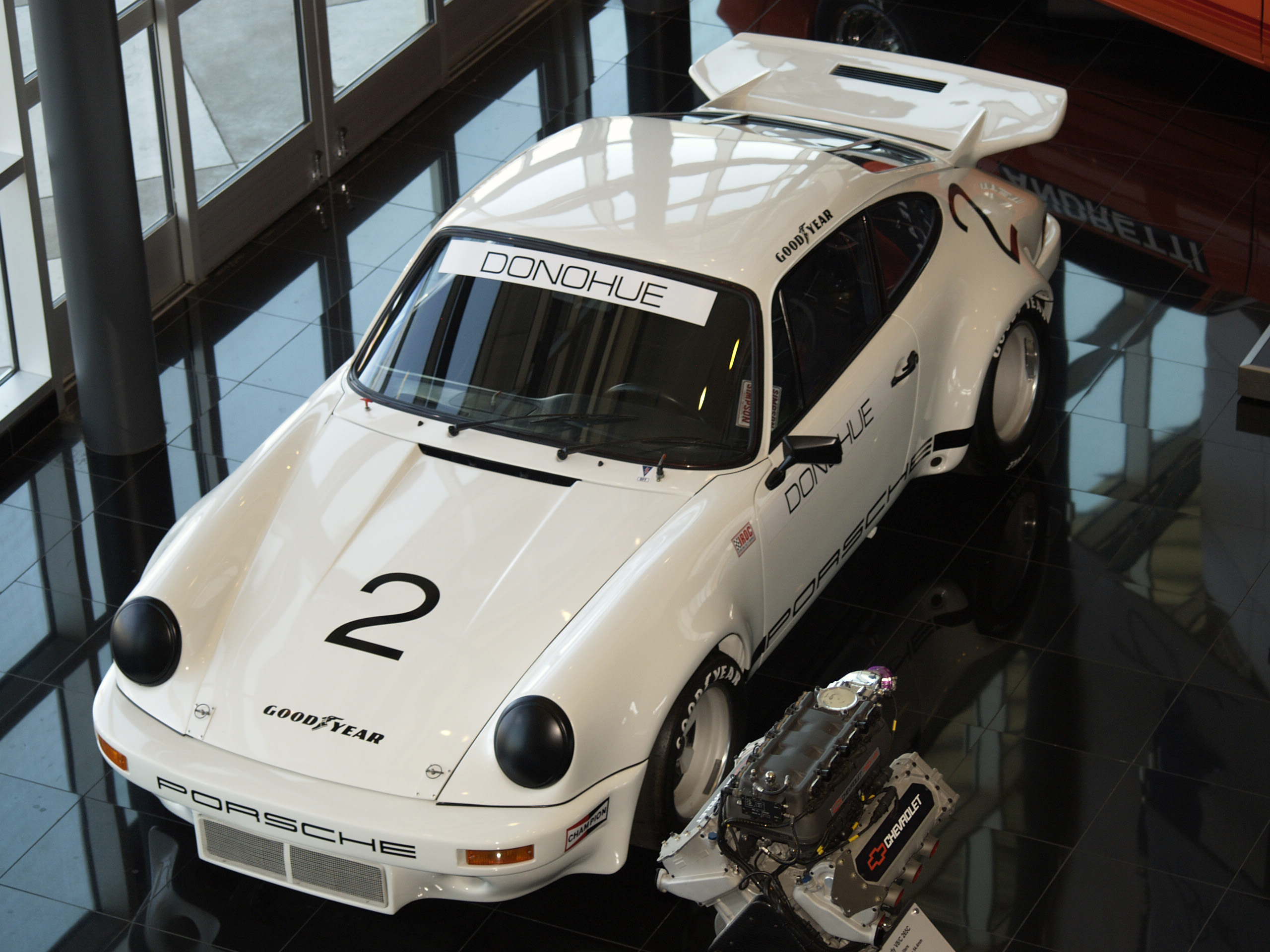
The Porsche Carrera RSR in which Donohue won the inaugural IROC championship

Donohue raced in the inaugural IROC series in 1973–74, racing identical, specially-prepared Porsche RSRs. In the four-race series, Donohue won the first and third of three races at Riverside and the final race of the year at Daytona. The only person to beat Donohue was his former Penske Trans-Am teammate, George Follmer. In winning the first IROC championship, Donohue beat the best racing drivers of that era from all of the major championships, such as Denny Hulme, Richard Petty, A. J. Foyt, Emerson Fittipaldi, Bobby Allison, David Pearson, Peter Revson, Bobby Unser, and Gordon Johncock.

== Retirement and Formula One ==
The pressures of developing and racing the Porsche 917/30 took their toll on Donohue. He announced that he would retire from racing after the 1973 Can-Am season. In addition, the horrific events at the 1973 Indianapolis 500 and the subsequent death of his friend, Swede Savage, pushed him to quit. His retirement was short-lived, however, as he returned to competitive driving when Penske formed a Formula One team, Penske Cars Ltd, to compete in the final two events of the 1974 Formula One World Championship, and to continue competing in 1975 with the new Penske PC1.

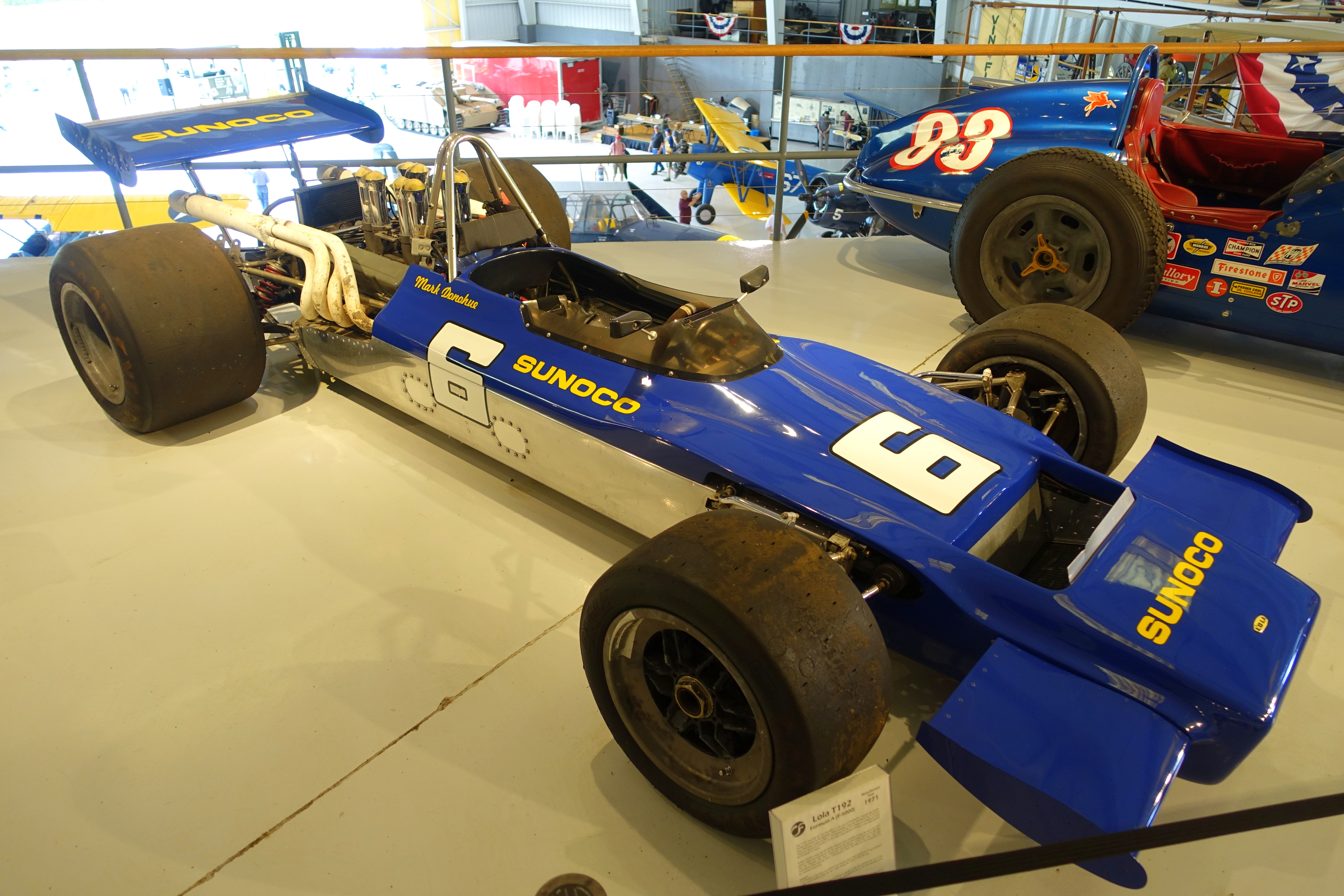
1971 Lola T192 Formula A (F-5000) driven by Donohue

Donohue previously had debuted in Formula One in the 1971 season on September 19, 1971, with a Penske-sponsored McLaren car entered by the White Racing privateer team at the Canadian Grand Prix at Mosport Park, finishing on the podium in third place. After coming out of retirement with his former boss, Penske, Donohue returned to Formula One, entering into the final two races of the 1974 Formula One season. Donohue finished in 12th place at the Canadian Grand Prix, but failed to finish at the United States Grand Prix.

A full season of racing for the 1975 Formula One season was planned. The 1975 season turned out to be a difficult one for Donohue and Penske. Donohue was able to muster fifth-place finishes at the Swedish Grand Prix and the British Grand Prix, but the new Penske PC1 chassis proved problematic, as evidenced by three retirements in the first six races. At the Austrian Grand Prix, Donohue's career, along with Roger Penske's Formula One aspirations, took a tragic turn.

== Death ==
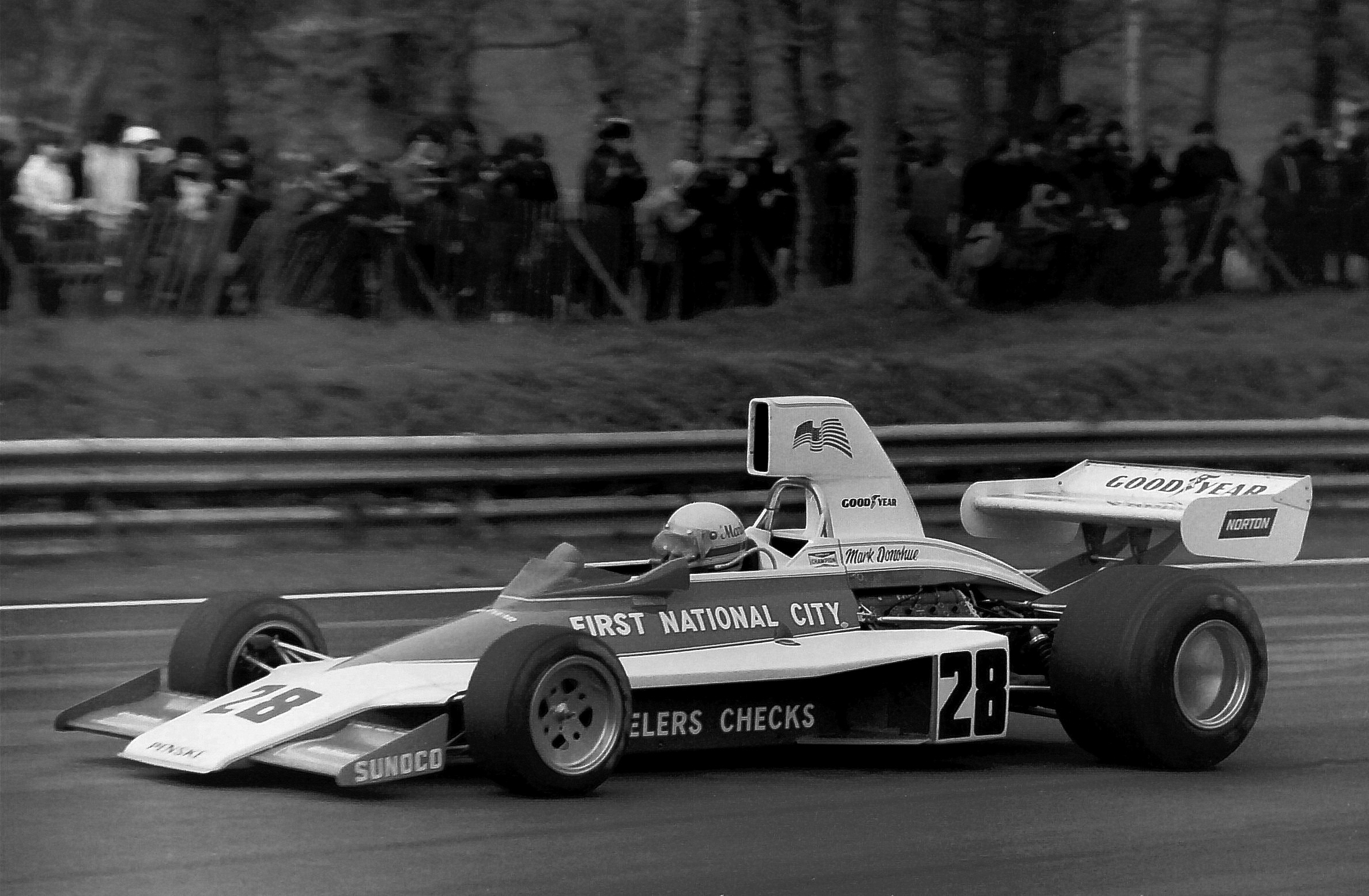
Donohue driving a Penske PC1 at the 1975 Race of Champions

Midway through the 1975 F1 season, Penske abandoned the troublesome PC1 and started using the March 751. Donohue recently had arrived in Austria for the Austrian Grand Prix at the Österreichring race track following the successful closed-course speed record attempt at Talladega Superspeedway in Alabama just a few days earlier. During a practice session for the race, Donohue lost control of his March after a tire failed, sending him into the catch fencing at Turn 1 (known as Vöest Hügel Kurve). A track marshal was killed by debris from the accident, but Donohue did not appear to be injured significantly. It is said that Donohue's head struck either a catch fencing post or the bottom of the wood frame for an advertising billboard located alongside of the racetrack. A headache resulted, however, and worsened. After going to the hospital in Graz the next day, Donohue lapsed into a coma from a cerebral hemorrhage and died. He was survived by his second wife and two sons from his first marriage. Donohue is buried at St. Teresa Cemetery in Summit, New Jersey.

The turn was tightened and became the Hella Licht Esses in 1977. Donohue's estate was involved in litigation against Penske and Goodyear that was settled in 1986, claiming tire failure killed Donohue. Goodyear paid the widow and children $9.6 million.

== Commemorations and legacy ==
In 2003, in commemoration of Penske Racing's 50th NASCAR win, Nextel Cup driver Ryan Newman drove a Dodge Intrepid painted to resemble Donohue's 1973 AMC (with a No. 12 and current Alltel decals) at the fall Rockingham, North Carolina, race.

Penske's new Penske Racing complex in Mooresville, North Carolina is decorated with various murals of Donohue and his racing cars, most notably the AMC stock car and the various Porsche prototypes that Donohue drove through his career.

Donohue chronicled his entire racing career in the book, The Unfair Advantage (co-written with noted motorsports and engineering journalist Paul Van Valkenburgh). The book documents his career from his first races to his final full season of racing the year before he was killed. This was not merely a celebrity autobiography, but a detailed, step-by-step record of the engineering approach he took to getting the absolutely highest performance from every car he drove, always looking for that elusive "unfair advantage". Donohue (along with Penske) was pioneer in many respects, some as notable as the use of a skidpad as a tool for developing and perfecting race car suspension designs and setups. The book told how Donohue learned to exploit the anti-lock braking system and the powerful turbocharged engine of several prototype Porsches, as well as how he learned from various mishaps, including a near-fatal crash. The book was published shortly before Donohue's death.

The book was re-released in 2000 by Bentley Publishers (Cambridge, Massachusetts). It includes information and additional photography that was not available before the first edition was published.

Donohue's racing tradition is carried on by his son, David Donohue, a successful road racer in his own right.

== Awards ==
- Drexel University presented Donohue with its Engineering and Science Award in 1973.
- Donohue was inducted into the International Motorsports Hall of Fame in 1990.
- He was also inducted in the Motorsports Hall of Fame of America in 1990.
- He was inducted in the Sports Car Club of America Hall of Fame in its 2006 class.
- Donohue was inducted to the Trans-Am Series Hall of Fame in 2025.

== Motorsports career results ==
=== SCCA National Championship Runoffs ===
Year	Track	Car	Engine	Class	Finish	Start	Status
1961		Elva Courier	MGA	E Production	1	1	Running
1965	Daytona International Speedway	Lotus 20B	Ford	Formula C	2	8	Running
1965	Daytona International Speedway	Ford Mustang GT350	Ford	B Production	10	2	Retired
1966	Riverside Raceway	Ford Mustang GT350	Ford	B Production			Disqualified

=== Formula One World Championship ===
(key)

Year	Entrant	Chassis	Engine	1	2	3	4	5	6	7	8	9	10	11	12	13	14	15	WDC	Points
1971	Penske/K.F. White Racing	McLaren M19A	Ford V8	RSA	ESP	MON	NED	FRA	GBR	GER	AUT	ITA	CAN; 3	USA; DNS					16th	4
1974	Penske Cars	Penske PC1	Ford V8	ARG	BRA	RSA	ESP	BEL	MON	SWE	NED	FRA	GBR	GER	AUT	ITA	CAN; 12	USA; Ret	NC	0
1975	First National City Bank Team	Penske PC1	Ford V8	ARG; 7	BRA; Ret	RSA; 8	ESP; Ret	MON; Ret	BEL; 11	SWE; 5	NED; 8	FRA; Ret							15th	4
1975	First National City Bank Team	March 751	Ford V8										GBR; 5	GER; Ret	AUT; DNS	ITA	USA		15th	4

=== Formula One Non-Championship ===
(key)

Year	Entrant	Chassis	Engine	1	2	3	4	5	6	7	8
1971	Penske Racing	Lola T192 F5000	Chevrolet V8	ARG	ROC	QUE; 14	SPR	INT	RIN	OUL	VIC
1975	First National City Bank Team	Penske PC1	Ford V8	ROC; Ret	INT; 6	SUI					

=== Complete USAC Championship Car results ===
Year	1	2	3	4	5	6	7	8	9	10	11	12	13	14	15	16	17	18	19	20	21	22	23	24	25	26	27	28	Pos	Points
1968	HAN	LVG	PHX	TRE	INDY	MIL	MOS; 6	MOS; 4	LAN	PIP	CDR	NAZ	IRP	IRP	LAN	LAN	MTR	MTR	SPR	MIL	DUQ	ISF	TRE	SAC	MCH	HAN	PHX	RIV; 21	-	0
1969	PHX	HAN	INDY; 7	MIL	LAN	PIP	CDR	NAZ	TRE	IRP; DNQ	IRP	MIL	SPR	DOV	DUQ	ISF	BRN; 7	BRN; 4	TRE	SAC	KEN; 16	KEN	PHX	RIV; 21					-	0
1970	PHX	SON; 25	TRE	INDY; 2	MIL	LAN	CDR	MCH	IRP; 2	SPR	MIL	ONT; 30	DUQ	ISF	SED	TRE	SAC	PHX											-	0
1971	RAF	RAF	PHX; 6	TRE; 19	INDY; 25	MIL	POC; 1	MCH; 1	MIL	ONT; 18	TRE; 6	PHX; 16																	8th	1,760
1972	PHX; 17	TRE; 19	INDY; 1	MIL; 2	MCH	POC	MIL	ONT	TRE; 2	PHX; 16																			5th	1,720
1973	TWS	TRE	TRE	INDY; 15	MIL	POC; 17	MCH	MIL; DNQ	ONT	ONT	ONT; 29	MCH	MCH	TRE	TWS	PHX													-	0

=== Indianapolis 500 results ===
Year	Chassis	Engine	Start	Finish	Entrant
1969	Lola	Offy	4th	7th	Penske
1970	Lola	Ford	5th	2nd	Penske
1971	McLaren	Offy	2nd	25th	Penske
1972	McLaren	Offy	3rd	**1st**	Penske
1973	Eagle	Offy	3rd	15th	Penske

=== NASCAR ===
==== Winston Cup Series ====
NASCAR Winston Cup Series results
Year	Team	No.	Make	1	2	3	4	5	6	7	8	9	10	11	12	13	14	15	16	17	18	19	20	21	22	23	24	25	26	27	28	29	30	31	NWCC	Pts
1972	Penske Racing	16	AMC	RSD; 39	DAY; 35	RCH	ONT; 44	CAR	ATL; 15	BRI	DAR	NWS	MAR	TAL	CLT	DOV	MCH	RSD	TWS	DAY	BRI	TRN	ATL	TAL	MCH	NSV	DAR	RCH	DOV	MAR	NWS	CLT	CAR	TWS	124th	0
1973	Penske Racing	16	AMC	RSD; 1*	DAY	RCH	CAR	BRI	ATL; 30	NWS	DAR	MAR	TAL	NSV	CLT	DOV	TWS	RSD	MCH	DAY	BRI	ATL	TAL	NSV	DAR	RCH	DOV	NWS	MAR	CLT	CAR				131st	0

===== Daytona 500 =====
Year	Team	Manufacturer	Start	Finish
1972	Penske Racing	AMC	10	35

=== International Race of Champions ===
(key) (Bold – Pole position. * – Most laps led.)

International Race of Champions results
Year	Make	1	2	3	4	Pos.	Points	Ref
1973–74	Porsche	RSD; 1*	RSD; 12	RSD; 1*	DAY; 1*	1st	N/A	

=== Complete Canadian-American Challenge Cup results ===
(key) (Races in bold indicate pole position) (Races in italics indicate fastest lap)

Year	Team	Car	Engine	1	2	3	4	5	6	7	8	9	10	11	Pos	Pts
1966	Roger Penske Racing	Lola T70 Mk.2	Chevrolet	MTR; Ret	BRI; 5	MOS; 1	LAG; 4	RIV; 4	LVG; 3						2nd	21
1967	Roger Penske Racing	Lola T70 Mk.3B	Chevrolet	ROA; 2	BRI; Ret	MOS; Ret	LAG; Ret	RIV; 3	LVG; 2						4th	16
1968	Roger Penske Racing	McLaren M6A	Chevrolet	ROA; 3	BRI; 1	EDM; 3	LAG; 8	RIV; 2	LVG; DNS						3rd	23
1969	Roger Penske Racing	Lola T163	Chevrolet	MOS	MTR; DNS	WGL	EDM	MOH; Ret	ROA	BRI	MCH	LAG	RIV	TWS	NC	0
1971	Roger Penske Racing	Ferrari 512M	Ferrari	MOS	MTR	ATL	WGL; Ret	MOH	ROA	BRA	EDM	LAG	RIV		NC	0
1972	Penske Racing	Porsche 917/10	Porsche	**MOS**; 2	ATL	WGL	MOH	ROA	**BRA**; 17	EDM; 1	**LAG**; 2	RIV; 3			4th	62
1973	Roger Penske Enterprises	Porsche 917/30	Porsche	**MOS**; 7	**ATL**; 2	**WGL**; 1	**MOH**; 1	**ROA**; 1	**EDM**; 1	**LAG**; 1	**RIV**; 1				1st	139

=== Complete 24 Hours of Le Mans results ===
Year	Team	Co-drivers	Car	Class	Laps	Pos.	Class pos.
1966	(United States) Ford Motor Company (United States) Holman & Moody	(Australia) Paul Hawkins	Ford GT40 Mk.II	P +5.0	12	DNF	DNF
1967	(United States) Ford Motor Company (United States) Shelby-American Inc.	(New Zealand) Bruce McLaren	Ford GT40 Mk.IV	P +5.0	359	4th	**2nd**
1971	(United States) North American Racing Team (United States) Penske Racing	(United Kingdom) David Hobbs	Ferrari 512M	S 5.0	58	DNF	DNF

== See also ==
- Roger Penske
- Indianapolis Motor Speedway
- George Follmer
- Walt Hansgen
- Skidpad
- Turbocharger
- Brown University
- Lola Cars
- Vehicle Dynamics
- Elva (car manufacturer)

== Publications ==
- Donohue, Mark (2000-11-09). The Unfair Advantage. Driving. ISBN 978-0-8376-0069-7.

Sporting positions
Preceded by Jerry Titus	Trans-Am; Champion; 1968–69 – Chevrolet Camaro	Succeeded by Parnelli Jones
Preceded by Bill Vukovich II	Indianapolis 500; Rookie of the Year; 1969 – Lola-Offy	Succeeded by Donnie Allison
Preceded by Parnelli Jones	Trans-Am; Champion; 1971 – AMC Javelin	Succeeded by George Follmer
Preceded by Al Unser	Indianapolis 500; Winner; 1972 – McLaren M16-Offy	Succeeded by Gordon Johncock
Preceded by George Follmer	Can-Am; Champion; 1973 – Porsche 917-30	Succeeded by Jackie Oliver
Preceded by First Champion	International Race of Champions; Champion; 1973/74 – Porsche RSR	Succeeded by Bobby Unser
Preceded by Helmut Koinigg	Formula One fatal accidents August 19, 1975	Succeeded by Tom Pryce
