= Brabham BT25 =

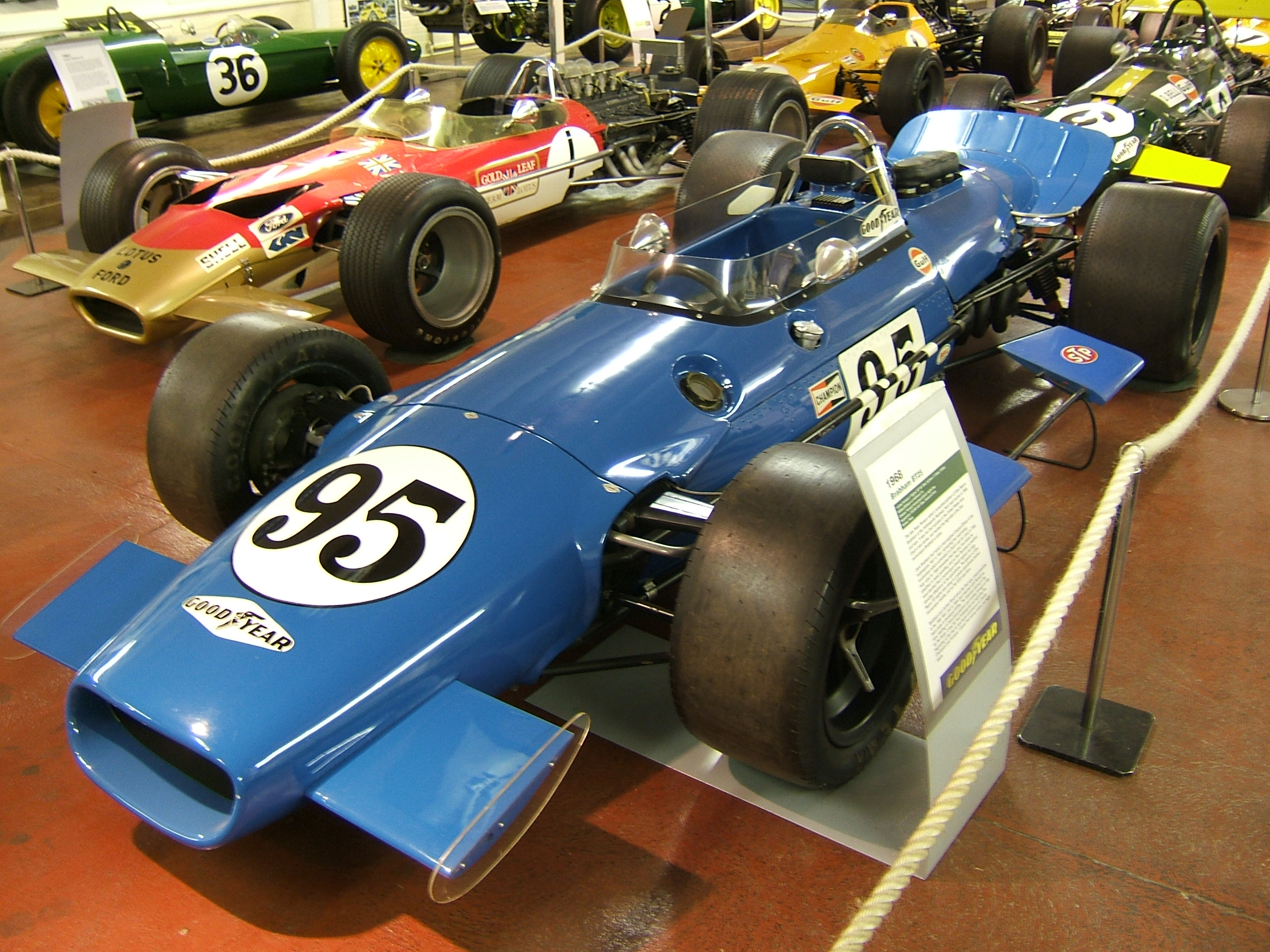
Brabham BT25 IndyCar

The Brabham BT25 was an open-wheel racing car used in the 1968 and 1969 USAC Championships.

Two examples of the BT25 were built by Brabham in 1968 to compete in USAC Championship races. The cars were powered by a 4.2-liter Repco-Brabham V8 engine. The cars were driven in 1968 by Jack Brabham, Jochen Rindt, and Masten Gregory.

At the 1969 Indianapolis 500, Peter Revson finished fifth in his BT25. Revson also piloted a BT25 to the only race win in the championship when it won a 1969 championship race at Indianapolis Raceway Park.
