= 1972 California 500 =

American auto race

(United States) 1972 California 500
Race details
- Race 8 of 10 in the 1972 USAC Championship Car season
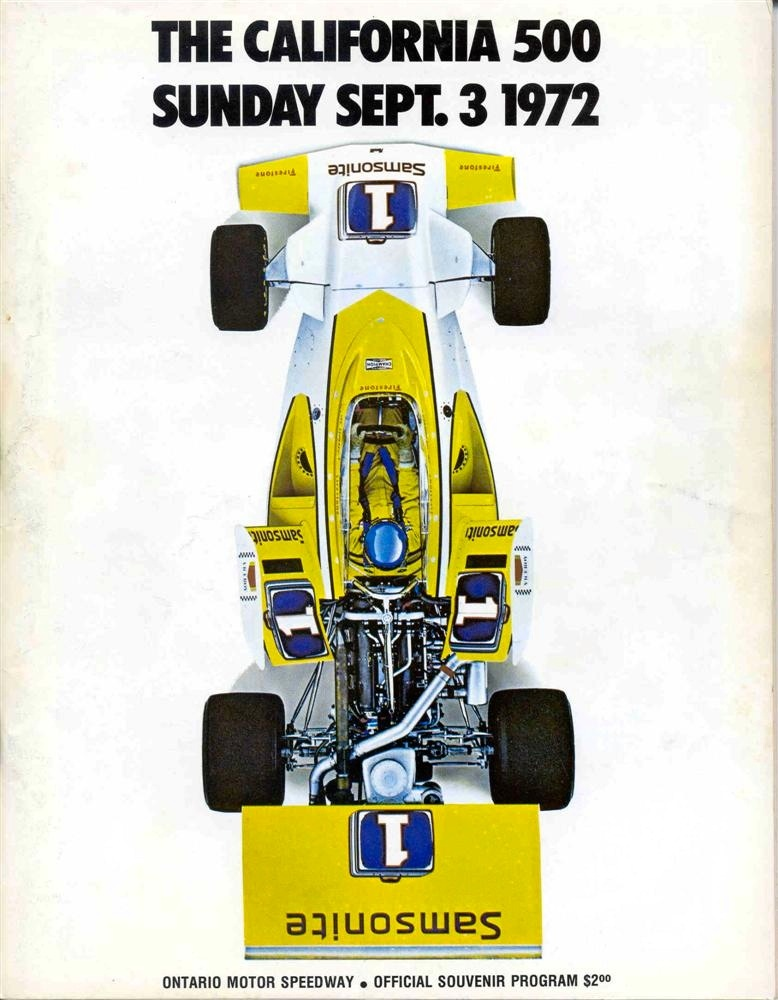
- Date: September 3, 1972
- Official name: 1972 California 500
- Location: Ontario Motor Speedway, Ontario, California, United States
- Course: Permanent racing facility 2.500 mi / 4.023 km
- Distance: 200 laps 500.000 mi / 804.672 km

Pole position
- Driver: (United States) Jerry Grant (Oscar Olson)
- Time: 199.600 mph (321.225 km/h)

Podium
- First: (United States) Roger McCluskey (Lindsey Hopkins)
- Second: (United States) Mike Hiss (Team Penske)
- Third: (United States) Bill Vukovich II (Jerry O'Connell)

The 1972 California 500, the third running of the event, was held at the Ontario Motor Speedway in Ontario, California, on Sunday, September 3, 1972. The event was race number 8 of 10 in the 1972 USAC Championship Car season. The race was won by Roger McCluskey, his first 500-mile Indy Car victory. In qualifying, Jerry Grant became the first IndyCar driver to ever break to 200 mile per hour barrier.

== Background ==
Mark Donohue won the 1972 Indianapolis 500. On July 3, 1972, Donohue] suffered injuries to his left knee and thigh in a Can-Am testing crash at Road Atlanta. Donohue required surgery to repair torn ligaments and would miss the California 500. He was replaced at Team Penske by Mike Hiss, who himself drove wearing a leg brace to recuperate a broken leg suffered in a motorcycle accident.

== Practice and Time Trials ==
Practice began on Saturday, August 19. With a speed of 175.155 mph, Denny Zimmerman was the fastest of only three car that chose to participate. On day two, Lloyd Ruby ran the fastest speed at 176.335 mph. Monday's practice attracted more top drivers with Johnny Rutherford posting the fastest speed at 188.742 mph, followed by Mario Andretti and Joe Leonard. On a Tuesday where air temperatures exceeded 100 degrees and track temperature reached 143 degrees, Rutherford upped his top speed to 191.530 mph. Mike Hiss suffered a minor back abrasion when he crashed into the wall with the rear of his Penske-prepared McLaren. Mario Andretti led Wednesday's practice session with a speed of 189.681 mph. On Thursday, Bobby Unser made his much-anticipated first practice run and ran a speed of 195.202 mph.

On Friday, Unser's teammate, Jerry Grant, ran a fast lap of 196.287 mph post the fastest practice lap of the week. A special qualifying session was held for Peter Revson and George Follmer who planned to compete in the Can-Am Series race at Road America. Revson ran a four-lap average speed of 194.470 mph, with a fastest lap of 194.860 mph. Follmer suffered engine troubles and withdrew from the California 500. Rules stated that Revson would not be eligible for the pole because his run came on Friday, but he would be able to start as high as second depending on his speed.

=== Pole Day - Saturday August 26 ===
A qualifying crowd of 61,430 saw the fastest lap in auto racing history. Jerry Grant became the first IndyCar driver to break the 200 mile per hour barrier when he ran a lap with a speed of 201.414 mph. His four lap average speed was 199.600 mph. Peter Revson's Friday speed was fast enough to claim the second position. Revson's McLaren teammate, Gordon Johncock completed the front row with an average speed of 194.041 mph. Johncock's run was interrupted after two laps when a caution flag was waved for a jackrabbit on track. After returning to the pits, Johncock completed his final two laps.

Johnny Rutherford brushed the wall with his right-rear exiting turn one and spun into the infield. His car was repaired but unable to make another attempt before qualifying ended.

Pole-favorite Bobby Unser suffered a series of engine problems that delayed his qualifying attempt. A pair of blown engines in morning and mid-day practices. A third engine was put in Unser's car for a last minute qualifying run but after taking warm-up laps, Unser coasted to a stop on-track with a blown manifold.

=== Bump Day - Sunday August 27 ===
Bobby Unser qualified for the race with an average speed of 201.374 mph. Unser's best speed was a lap of 201.965 mph. The engine he used was the same one he won the pole for the Pocono 500, retrieved by Dan Gurney from their nearby race shop after Unser's engine problems on Saturday. It was a track record and the first time an IndyCar qualified for a race with an average speed over 200 mph. Because the run came on day two of Time Trials, Unser starter the race 23rd. Hoping to avoid continued bad luck, Unser carrier a horseshoe, a chicken wishbone, and a tiny olive branch with him on his run.

Jim Hurtubise attempted to qualify late in the afternoon. After a lap of 187.464 mph, fast enough to make the field, his engine blew on lap two. Bill Simpson, Dick Simon, Jim McElreath, and Greg Weld were bumped from the field. Simpson pulled out a 1968 Eagle backup car and requalified for the race.

== Race ==
161,240 spectators attended the California 500. Delivering the command to start engines was grand marshal, Tricia Nixon Cox, daughter of US President Richard Nixon. After failing to qualify for the race, Dick Simon drove the Datsun 240Z pace car.

On the pace lap, pole-sitter Jerry Grant suffered engine failure and retired from the race. It was the first time in IndyCar's history of 500 mile races that a polesitter failed to start the race.

The pole position was left vacant and put Peter Revson in control of the start with teammate Gordon Johncock alongside. Both McLaren cars got slow starts and A. J. Foyt, from his position on the outside of row two, swept to the inside of the McLarens and took the lead.

The first caution came out on lap four when a rabbit ran on track. The caution was out for seven laps while track workers chased it off track. One lap after the race returned to green, the rabbits returned and the caution was thrown again.

Foyt led the first 27 laps and was leading when the gearbox broke on his car on lap 28. From his 23rd starting spot, Bobby Unser climbed through the field. He took the lead on lap 45 and led for 11 laps. Running third on lap 74, Unser blew an engine and stalled on track. The caution was thrown to retrieve Unser's car. While behind the pace car, rain began to fall and the race was stopped for almost two hours.

USAC encountered confusion over who was leading. Initially, Mike Hiss was scored the leader. Later, officials corrected the leaderboard and put Gordon Johncock in the lead, with Hiss one lap down.

After completing 134 laps, John Mahler spun when his ignition system cut off. The car hit the turn two wall and flipped over. The car landed upside down but Mahler walked away uninjured.

Roger McCluskey took the lead for the first time on lap 160. Running second with 30 laps remaining, Johncock suffered a water leak and crashed in turn two. Johncock had led a race-high 94 laps. With five laps remaining, the second-place car of Mike Mosley suffered a broken transmission and retired from the race. Mosley finished fifth.

Roger McCluskey won the California 500 by one lap over Mike Hiss and Bill Vukovich Jr. McCluskey won $131,081. It was his first IndyCar victory since 1968. McCluskey was driving the same McLaren chassis that Peter Revson used to win the pole and finish second in the 1971 Indianapolis 500.

== Box score ==
Finish	Grid	No	Name	Entrant	Chassis	Engine	Laps	Time/Status	Led	Points
1	8	14	(United States) Roger McCluskey	Lindsey Hopkins Racing	McLaren M16A	Offenhauser	200	3:17:58	40	1000
2	20	66	(United States) Mike Hiss	Penske Racing	McLaren M16B	Offenhauser	199	Flagged	0	800
3	13	3	(United States) Bill Vukovich II	Jerry O'Connell Racing	Eagle	Offenhauser	199	Flagged	5	700
4	11	84	(United States) Sammy Sessions	A. J. Foyt Enterprises	Coyote	Ford	196	Flagged	0	600
5	10	98	(United States) Mike Mosley	Leader Card Racers	Eagle 68	Offenhauser	195	Transmission	23	500
6	18	77	(United States) Salt Walther	Dayton-Walther	McLaren	Offenhauser	195	Flagged	0	400
7	31	20	(United States) Art Pollard	Andy Granatelli	Lola T270	Ford	194	Flagged	0	300
8	22	29	(United States) George Snider	MVS	Coyote	Ford	192	Flagged	0	250
9	29	28	(United States) Bill Simpson	Bill Simpson	Eagle	Offenhauser	183	Flagged	0	200
10	24	16	(United States) Johnny Rutherford	Don Gerhardt	Eagle	Offenhauser	178	Differential	0	150
11	14	15	(United States) Steve Krisiloff	Grant King Racers	King	Offenhauser	178	Flagged	0	100
12	7	52	(United States) Jimmy Caruthers	Gene White Co.	Atlanta	Offenhauser	171	Water line	0	50
13	3	24	(United States) Gordon Johncock	Team McLaren	McLaren M16B	Offenhauser	169	Crash	94	0
14	27	61	(United States) Carl Williams	Eisenhour-Brayton Racing Team	Coyote	Ford	164	Throttle	0	0
15	30	97	(United States) Rick Muther	Vel's Parnelli Jones Racing	Eagle	Offenhauser	162	Flagged	0	0
16	9	1	(United States) Joe Leonard	Vel's Parnelli Jones Racing	Parnelli VPJ1	Offenhauser	162	Piston	0	0
17	16	5	(United States) Lloyd Ruby	Gene White Co.	Lola T270	Ford	149	Turbocharger	0	0
18	15	68	(United States) John Mahler	Roy Woods Racing	McLaren	Offenhauser	134	Crash	0	0
19	12	34	(United States) Sam Posey	Champ Carr Inc.	Eagle 72	Offenhauser	123	Ignition	0	0
20	19	18	(United States) Swede Savage	Patrick-Mitchner Racing	Brabham	Offenhauser	118	Turocharger	0	0
21	32	40	(United States) Wally Dallenbach	Andy Granatelli	Lola T270	Ford	109	Valve	0	0
22	33	94	(United States) Johnny Parsons	Vatis Enterprises	Finley	Offenhauser	88	Valve	0	0
23	2	12	(United States) Peter Revson	Team McLaren	McLaren M16B	Offenhauser	81	Oil pressure	0	0
24	23	6	(United States) Bobby Unser	All American Racers	Eagle 72	Offenhauser	73	Engine	11	0
25	17	27	(United States) Denny Zimmerman	Vollstedt Enterprises	Vollstedt	Offenhauser	58	Oil pressure	0	0
26	21	10	(United States) Lee Kunzman	Lindsey Hopkins Racing	Eagle	Offenhauser	56	Spun out	0	0
27	5	9	(United States) Mario Andretti	Vel's Parnelli Jones Racing	Parnelli VPJ1	Offenhauser	52	Engine	0	0
28	26	23	(United States) Mel Kenyon	Lindsey Hopkins Racing	Eagle	Offenhauser	48	Differential	0	0
29	25	83	(United States) Jerry Karl	Smokey Yunick	Eagle	Chevrolet	45	Transmission	0	0
30	6	2	(United States) A. J. Foyt	A. J. Foyt Enterprises	Coyote	Foyt	28	Differential	27	0
31	4	4	(United States) Al Unser	Vel's Parnelli Jones Racing	Parnelli VPJ1	Offenhauser	27	Throttle	0	0
32	28	89	(United States) John Martin	Automotive Technology	Brabham	Offenhauser	19	Piston	0	0
33	1	48	(United States) Jerry Grant	All American Racers	Eagle	Offenhauser	0	Engine	0	0
