= 1972 Pocono 500 =

(United States) 1972 Pocono 500
Race details
- 6th round of the 1972 USAC Championship Car season
- Date: July 29, 1972
- Official name: 1972 Schaefer 500
- Location: Long Pond, Pennsylvania
- Course: Permanent racing facility 2.5 mi / 4.023 km
- Distance: 200 laps 500 mi / 804.672 km
- Weather: Temperatures up to 77 °F (25 °C); wind speeds up to 12 miles per hour (19 km/h)

Pole position
- Driver: (United States) Bobby Unser (All American Racers)
- Time: 189.473 mph

Podium
- First: (United States) Joe Leonard (Vel's Parnelli Jones Racing)
- Second: (United States) Johnny Rutherford (Don Gerhardt)
- Third: (United States) Al Unser (Vel's Parnelli Jones Racing)

The 1972 Pocono 500, the 2nd running of the event, was held at the Pocono Raceway in Long Pond, Pennsylvania, on Saturday, July 29, 1972. Branded as the 1972 Schaefer 500 for sponsorship reasons, the race was won by Joe Leonard. The race is notable for its impact by Hurricane Agnes and the confrontation between the track and USAC.

== Race Schedule ==
After rain cancelled track activity on Monday, practice opened on Tuesday, June 20. 29 cars took practice laps with Bobby Unser posting the fastest speed, 185.299 mph.

== Hurricane Agnes Impact ==
Rain cancelled practice on Wednesday as Hurricane Agnes impacted Pennsylvania. Less than 100 miles away, 12.53 inches of rain fell in Harrisburg between 8 pm on June 21 and 8 pm on June 22. Flooding of the Susquehanna River damaged 13,000 homes in Wilkes-Barre.

Across the state, there were 50 fatalities, 220,000 people were left homeless, and over $2.3 billion in damages.

The Pocono area received over seven inches of rain from Hurricane Agnes but suffered no major damage as the region's high elevation prevented the flooding that devastated other areas. Teams continued to report to the track each day but rain showers washed out seven consecutive practice days.

Practice resumed on Tuesday, June 27 with track time extended from 9 a.m. until dusk. Peter Revson, driving for McLaren, had the fastest lap speed at 185.632 mph.

In Wednesday's practice session, Bobby Unser had the fastest speed at 188.442 mph. Qualifying was rescheduled for Thursday and Friday.

On Wednesday, Governor Milton Shapp sent a letter to Pocono Raceway president Joseph Mattioli asking that the race be postponed due to the devastation in surrounding areas. "Dear Dr. Mattioli, Due to the extreme emergency in Pennsylvania, which includes the Wilkes Barre area and other parts of the northeast region, I suggest that you consider postponing the Schaefer 500 at Pocono Raveway on July 2nd to a future date this summer. I understand that approximately 100,000 people are expected to attend this event. That would put an added strain on the facilities in the areas which are severely limited. I regret this inconvenience but I am certain you can appreciate the problems we are facing at this time."

While cars practiced, a heated five hour meeting was held between Pocono Raceway and USAC to discuss rescheduling.

On Wednesday night, the track announced that the race would be postponed, an announcement strongly opposed by USAC. In addition to the letter from Governor Shapp, the track presented the sanctioning body with a list of reasons why the race should be cancelled. USAC executive director, Bill Smyth said, "I don't consider any of their reasons legitimate. We offered to assist them in solving every one of them but were rejected." If the track had not postponed the race, the Pennsylvania Department of Environmental Resources were prepared to get an injunction to stop the race because a lack of facilities to dispose of sewage waste would have created a public health hazard.

The move to postpone the event created strong debate from drivers and team owners. Driver Jim Hurtubise agreed with postponing the race, saying "I think you guys are right and USAC ought to realize it. I took a ride through this area yesterday and I'll tell you I sure wouldn't want to be living here with all the suffering that's going on." After hearing Hurtubise's comments, an unnamed fellow driver responded by saying, "he's had nine or ten beers, he'd say anything at this point."

USAC's Bill Smyth maintained that practice the next morning, and the race on Sunday, would continue despite the track announcing a postponement. He maintained the sanctioning agreement gave USAC the sole authority to postpone the race, not the track. "We're ready to run, and our drivers and officials will be at the track at 8 a.m." Smyth said Wednesday night.

As a light rain fell the following morning, teams in the garage found the gates leading to the track surface locked, with two security guards stationed at each gate. Unable to venture on track, teams loaded up their equipment and left.

Driver Gary Bettenhausen said, "As the drivers' representative (on USAC's Board of Directors), I am going to suggest that the grass grow very tall before we come back here again. Either that or jack the purse by $100,000 for every future race." Bettenhausen's car-owner, Roger Penske, was strongly in support of track management and threatened to withdraw his team from Indy car racing should the circuit be treated unfairly.

"I'm not trying to start anything with Gary, but he's speaking for himself," Penske said. "If USAC doesn't re-sanction this race for this year, I'll resign as (USAC) Eastern Vice President. Not only that, I'll consider withdrawing my cars from championship competition... and maybe I'll start my own sanctioning organization."

On July 5, USAC board of directors convened in Indianapolis and agreed to reschedule the Schaefer 500 for July 29, one day before a previously scheduled USAC Stock Car race.

On July 8 and 9, Pocono Raceway hosted Concert 10, a rock concert festival that attracted an estimated 200,000 people.

== Practice and Time Trials ==
On July 3, defending Pocono 500 and Indianapolis 500 champion, Mark Donohue, suffered injuries to his left knee and thigh in a Can-Am testing crash at Road Atlanta. Donohue required surgery to repair torn ligaments and was withdrawn from the rescheduled Pocono 500.

Practice resumed on Monday, July 24. Gary Bettenhausen posted the fastest speed at 184.3 mph.

The first day of qualifications took place on Tuesday, July 25. Similar to Indianapolis, the field was set by time trials consisting of a 4-lap, 10-mile run. A brief rainstorm delayed qualifying for two hours around midday.

Late in the day, near darkness, Bobby Unser broke the track record and won the pole with an average speed of 189.473 mph. It was over 17 mph faster than Mark Donohue's pole in 1971. "I could hardly see the white line markers on the course," Unser said. "And I was watching that rain cloud just over the third turn, so I drove faster in order to get home before they shut the track down." Gordon Johncock and Mario Andretti joined Unser on the front row.

Driving the same chassis that Mark Donohue drove to victory in the 1971 Schaefer 500, Salt Walther qualified 12th at 177.187 mph.

Peter Revson, who did not post a qualifying time on day one, had the fastest speed on Wednesday's time trials at 180.277 mph.

== Race ==
1957 Indianapolis 500 winner Sam Hanks drove the pace car for the race, a 1972 Dodge Charger specially prepared by Raybestos to be given to the race winner after the checkered flag.

From the outside of the front row, Mario Andretti took the lead on lap one. On the second lap, he was passed by Gordon Johncock, who led for three laps before being passed by Bobby Unser.

Johncock's teammate at McLaren, Peter Revson, who skipped Formula One's German Grand Prix to participate at Pocono, fell out of the race after only seven laps due to a broken connecting rod.

Andretti retook the lead on lap 11. On lap 16, polesitter Bobby Unser made a pitstop under green to change a flat tire. Later, his car developed shift linkage problems and he dropped out of the race after he completed 77 laps.

After leading 138 laps at Indianapolis before falling out with engine problems, Gary Bettenhausen took the lead for the first time on lap 39, and appeared to be headed for a possible victory at Pocono.

Swede Savage started 27th and impressed by climbing to the fourth position when he retired after 63 laps with a broken gearbox.

Under caution on lap 78, race-leader Gary Bettenhausen stalled on the backstretch and retired with ignition troubles. Bettenhausen had led 40 laps.

After Bettenhausen's mechanical failure, Mario Andretti retook the lead. Andretti, who was on Pocono's board of directors at the time, led the next 85 laps.

After leading for a total of 105 laps, Andretti gave up a lead of 40 seconds over teammate Joe Leonard to make his final pit stop with 37 laps remaining. While in the pits, an overheated bushing on Andretti's gear shift lever stuck and it took the crew six minutes to fix the problem. He ultimately finished 7th, 12 laps off the pace.

On lap 173, Jimmy Caruthers brought out the fourth and final caution period when he crashed in turn three and was hospitalized with burns and contusions.

Joe Leonard led the final 37 laps and led Johnny Rutherford by 25 seconds at the checkered flag. However, Al Unser was erroneously scored as the race winner and given the checkered flag. Unser and Leonard both drove to victory lane while scoring was rechecked. One hour after the finish, the official results confirmed that Leonard was the winner.

Leonard received $84,530 in prize money, the 1972 Dodge Charger pace car, a Schaefer 500 ring, a silver tray autographed by all the drivers in the field, beer steins autographed by his pit crew, and a set of luggage from Atlantic (a competitor to his sponsor Samsonite).

== Box score ==
Finish	Grid	No	Name	Entrant	Chassis	Engine	Laps	Time/Status	Led	Points
1	6	1	(United States) Joe Leonard	Vel's Parnelli Jones Racing	Parnelli VPJ1	Offenhauser	200	3:13:49.315	37	1000
2	13	16	(United States) Johnny Rutherford	Don Gerhardt	Eagle	Offenhauser	200	+24.685	0	800
3	4	4	(United States) Al Unser	Vel's Parnelli Jones Racing	Parnelli VPJ1	Offenhauser	199	Flagged	7	700
4	28	3	(United States) Bill Vukovich II	Jerry O'Connell Racing	Eagle	Offenhauser	198	Flagged	0	600
5	14	34	(United States) Sam Posey	Champ Carr Inc.	Eagle 72	Offenhauser	198	Flagged	0	500
6	16	72	(United States) Mike Hiss	Page Racing Enterprises	Eagle	Offenhauser	196	Flagged	0	400
7	3	9	(United States) Mario Andretti	Vel's Parnelli Jones Racing	Parnelli VPJ1	Offenhauser	188	Flagged	105	300
8	12	77	(United States) Salt Walther	Dayton-Walther	McLaren	Offenhauser	187	Flagged	0	250
9	17	10	(United States) Lee Kunzman	Lindsey Hopkins Racing	Eagle	Offenhauser	174	Flagged	0	200
10	18	11	(United States) Jimmy Caruthers	Quality Racing Team	Scorpion	Foyt	160	Crash	0	150
11	9	14	(United States) Roger McCluskey	Lindsey Hopkins Racing	McLaren M16A	Offenhauser	135	Turbocharger	0	100
12	11	98	(United States) Rick Muther	Leader Card Racers	Eagle	Offenhauser	146	Overheating	0	50
13	25	23	(United States) Mel Kenyon	Lindsey Hopkins Racing	Coyote	Foyt	130	Pinion gear	0	0
14	15	40	(United States) Wally Dallenbach	Andy Granatelli	Lola T270	Foyt	129	Rear end	0	0
15	20	84	(United States) Sammy Sessions	A. J. Foyt Enterprises	Coyote	Foyt	118	Crash	0	0
16	22	44	(United States) Dick Simon	Dick Simon Racing	Lola	Foyt	127	Rear end	0	0
17	19	89	(United States) John Martin	Automotive Technology	Brabham	Offenhauser	89	Turbocharger	0	0
18	30	36	(United States) Bentley Warren	Bay State Auto Racing	Eagle	Offenhauser	82	Oil leak	0	0
19	5	7	(United States) Gary Bettenhausen	Penske Racing	McLaren M16B	Offenhauser	77	Ignition	40	0
20	1	6	(United States) Bobby Unser	All American Racers	Eagle 72	Offenhauser	77	Gear	6	0
21	29	29	(United States) George Snider	MVS	Coyote	Foyt	68	Valve	0	0
22	2	24	(United States) Gordon Johncock	Team McLaren	McLaren M16B	Offenhauser	64	Connecting rod	5	0
23	27	42	(United States) Swede Savage	Patrick-Mitchner Racing	Brabham	Offenhauser	63	Gearbox	0	0
24	21	28	(United States) Bill Simpson	Bill Simpson	Eagle	Offenhauser	41	Connecting rod	0	0
25	31	17	(United States) Denny Zimmerman	Vollstedt Enterprises	Vollstedt	Offenhauser	36	Throttle	0	0
26	8	5	(United States) Lloyd Ruby	Gene White Co.	Lola T270	Foyt	34	Crash	0	0
27	10	31	(United States) John Mahler	Vanguard Racing	McLaren	Offenhauser	34	Connecting rod	0	0
28	24	92	(United States) Jerry Karl	Automotive Technology	Gilbert	Offenhauser	20	Fuel tank	0	0
29	23	94	(United States) Bob Harkey	Vatis Enterprises	Findley	Offenhauser	13	Piston	0	0
30	32	95	(United States) Carl Williams	Vatis Enterprises	Eagle	Offenhauser	8	Piston	0	0
31	26	12	(United States) Peter Revson	Team McLaren	McLaren M16B	Offenhauser	7	Connecting rod	0	0
32	7	15	(United States) Steve Krisiloff	Grant King Racers	King	Offenhauser	4	Engine block	0	0
33	33	35	(United States) Greg Weld	Grant King Racers	King	Offenhauser	1	Vibration	0	0

== Television ==
A two and a half hour syndicated television broadcast of the Pocono 500 was aired a week after the race.
