= IROC I =

Motor car races held in 1973–1974

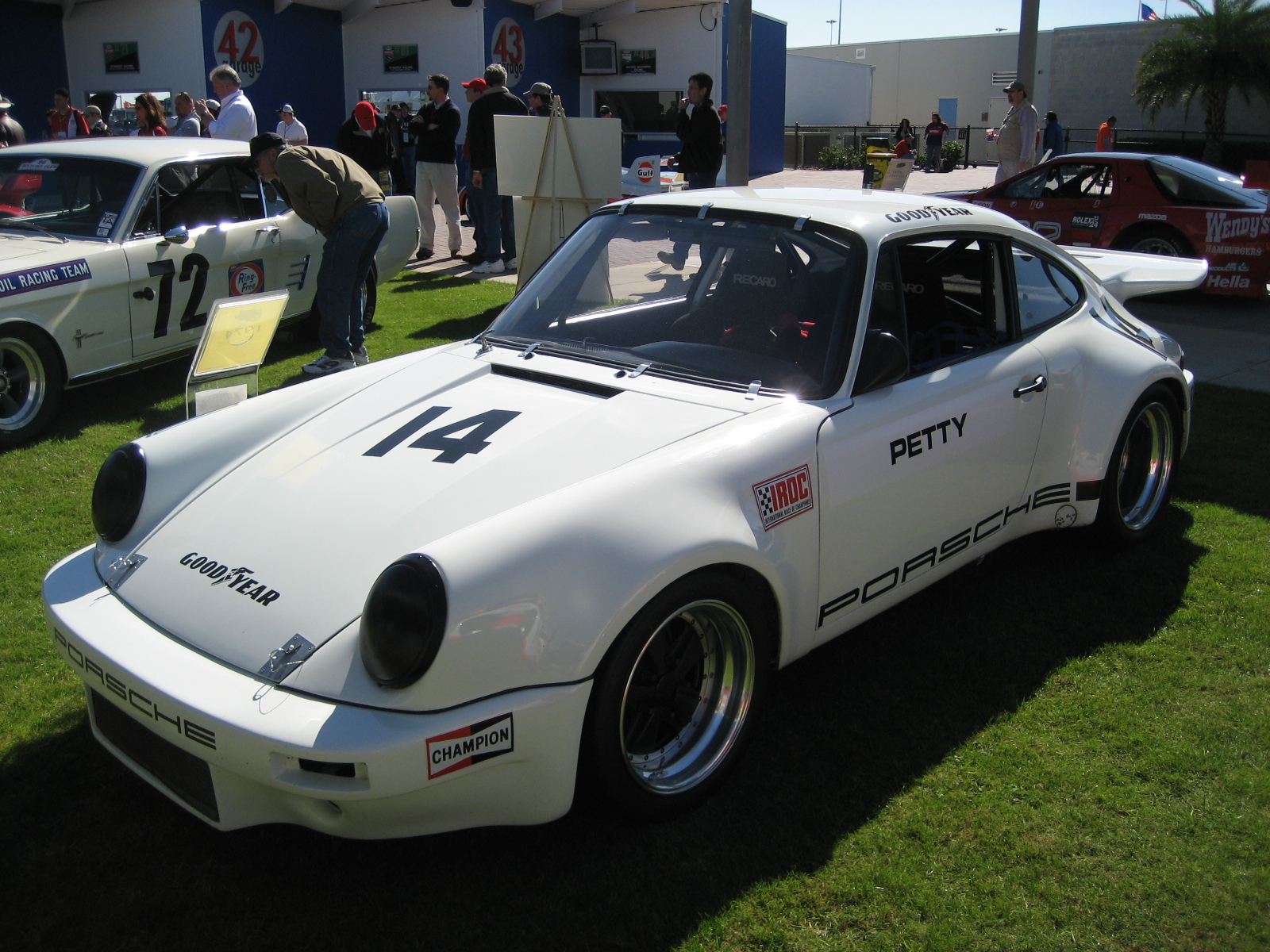
Richard Petty's Porsche Carrera from IROC I

IROC I was the inaugural International Race of Champions, which was held at two tracks over two weekends in 1973 and 1974. The first three races were held October 27 and 28, 1973 at Riverside International Raceway and the final race was held on the Daytona International Speedway road course on February 14, 1974. Champion Mark Donohue won $54000 and the championship, which was determined by prize money rather than points. The races were contested in Porsche Carrera RSR race cars. This was the only IROC to be contested entirely on road courses. Only the top 6 finishing drivers competed in all four races.

The roster of drivers and final points standings were as follows:

Rank	Driver	Winnings	Series
1	(United States) Mark Donohue	$54,000	SCCA Can-Am
2	(United States) Peter Revson	$21,200	SCCA Can-Am; Formula One
3	(United States) Bobby Unser	$19,100	USAC Champ Car
4	(United States) David Pearson	$14,600	NASCAR Winston Cup
5	(United States) George Follmer	$16,000	SCCA Can-Am
6	(United States) A. J. Foyt	$9,900	USAC Champ Car
7	(Brazil) Emerson Fittipaldi	$8,300	Formula One
8	(New Zealand) Denny Hulme	$6,000	Formula One
9	(United States) Bobby Allison	$5,400	NASCAR Winston Cup
10	(United States) Richard Petty	$5,400	NASCAR Winston Cup
11	(United States) Gordon Johncock	$5,100	USAC Champ Car
12	(United States) Roger McCluskey	$5,000	USAC Champ Car

Note: Jackie Stewart was originally scheduled to compete but retired from racing two weeks prior to the first race. He was replaced by A.J. Foyt, who had previously declined an invitation saying the all road course format was unfair to oval racers.

== Race results ==
=== Riverside International Raceway, Race One ===
1. 2- Mark Donohue
2. 7- Bobby Unser
3. 3- Peter Revson
4. 4- George Follmer
5. 6- Denis Hulme
6. 8- A. J. Foyt
7. 10- Richard Petty
8. 12- Roger McCluskey
9. 5- David Pearson
10. 11- Gordon Johncock
11. 9- Bobby Allison
12. 1- Emerson Fittipaldi

=== Riverside International Raceway, Race Two ===
1. 4- George Follmer
2. 9- David Pearson
3. 12- Emerson Fittipaldi
4. 3- Peter Revson
5. 6- A. J. Foyt
6. 2- Bobby Unser
7. 11- Bobby Allison
8. 5- Denis Hulme
9. 10- Gordon Johncock
10. 7- Richard Petty
11. 8- Roger McCluskey
12. 1- Mark Donohue

=== Riverside International Raceway, Race Three ===
1. 12- Mark Donohue
2. 6- Bobby Unser
3. 3- Emerson Fittipaldi
4. 2- David Pearson
5. 1- George Follmer
6. 5- A. J. Foyt
7. 4- Peter Revson
8. 8- Denis Hulme
9. 7- Bobby Allison
10. 10- Richard Petty
11. 9- Gordon Johncock
12. 11- Roger McCluskey

=== Daytona International Speedway, Race Four ===
1. 1- Mark Donohue
2. 2- Peter Revson
3. 5- Bobby Unser
4. 3- David Pearson
5. 4- George Follmer
6. 6- A. J. Foyt
