= Joe Leonard =

American racing driver (1932–2017)

- Born: Joseph Paul Leonard; August 4, 1932 San Diego, California, U.S.
- Died: April 27, 2017 (aged 84) San Jose, California, U.S.

Championship titles
- AMA Grand National (1954, 1956, 1957); USAC Championship Car (1971, 1972); Major victories Daytona 200 (1957, 1958); California 500 (1971); Pocono 500 (1972)

Champ Car career
- 98 races run over 11 years
- Best finish: 1st (1971, 1972)
- First race: 1964 Ted Horn Memorial (DuQuoin)
- Last race: 1974 California 500 (Ontario)
- First win: 1965 Milwaukee 150 (Milwaukee)
- Last win: 1972 Tony Bettenhausen 200 (Milwaukee)
Wins	Podiums	Poles
6	19	2

NASCAR Cup Series career
- 1 race run over 1 year
- First race: 1969 Firecracker 400 (Daytona)
Wins	Top tens	Poles
0	0	0

Joseph Paul Leonard (August 4, 1932 – April 27, 2017) was an American professional motorcycle racer and racecar driver.

== Biography ==
=== Motorcycle career ===
Leonard won the first A.M.A. Grand National Championship Series in 1954 and won it again in 1956 and 1957. His record totals 27 wins, including the 1957 and 1958 Daytona 200. He also resulted vice-champion in 1958, 1960 and 1961, third in 1955, and fifth in 1959. He retired from motorcycle racing at the completion of the 1961 season and turned his attention to auto racing. He was also a member of the AMA (American Motorcycle Association District 36) Sanctioned San Jose Motorcycle club (The Dons) which includes such famed alumni as Sam Arena, Tom Sifton, Kenny Eggers and Sam Arena Jr.

=== USAC National Championship career ===
==== Early years ====
Leonard made his transition to four wheels by racing on the NASCAR super modified circuit that ran at Fresno and San Jose. Leonard made his USAC National Championship debut during the 1964 season when he competed in five races for various teams. Leonard earned a best finish of fifth at the season-ending Bobby Ball Memorial at Phoenix International Raceway driving the No. 65 Travelon Trailer Christensen-Offenhauser. Leonard finished in 24th place in the standings.

==== Early success ====
In 1965, Leonard became teammates with Dan Gurney at Gurney's All American Racers team, driving the #29 All American Racers Hailbrand-Ford. During the season Leonard got his first win in the Milwaukee 150 at Wisconsin State Fairgrounds Park Speedway. Leonard also drove one race for legendary car builder and chief mechanic A. J. Watson at Leader Card Racing in the #2 Moog St. Louis Watson-Ford at the Langhorne 100 at Langhorne Speedway. At the end of the season, Leonard finished sixth in the final point standings. In 1966, Leonard continued to race for AAR on the paved ovals and road courses in the #6 Yamaha Eagle-Ford (although he did drive the #29 All American Bardahl Hailbrand-Ford at the Jimmy Bryan Memorial at Phoenix International Raceway) and drove the #7 Vita Fresh Orange Juice Meskowski-Offenhauser at the dirt tracks (along with the Atlanta 300 at Atlanta Motor Speedway in the #11 Huffaker-Offenhauser. Leonard recorded a best finish of third place three times en route to a fourth-place finish in points. Also, during the season at the Indianapolis 500 Leonard got his first top-ten in the historic race with a ninth-place finish.

In 1967, Leonard began the season for Sheraton-Thompson Racing in the #82 Sheraton-Thompson Racing Lotus-Ford and finished fourth at the season-opening Jimmy Bryan Memorial at Phoenix International Raceway. Starting at the Indianapolis 500 Leonard drove the #4 Sheraton-Thompson Racing Coyote-Ford. He qualified in fifth place and finished in third place. Leonard changed cars again for the two races that made up the Telegraph Trophy 200 at Mosport Park where he drove the #4 Sheraton-Thompson Racing Eagle-Ford.

After that race, Leonard began to drive for Vel's Parnelli Jones Racing in the #20 Wagner Lockheed Brake Fluid Mongoose-Ford (also sponsored by Vel's Ford Sales at the Hanford 200 at Hanford Motor Speedway and the Rex Mays 300 at Riverside International Raceway). His best finish of the season wound up being at Indianapolis as he finished ninth in points.

==== Revolving teams ====
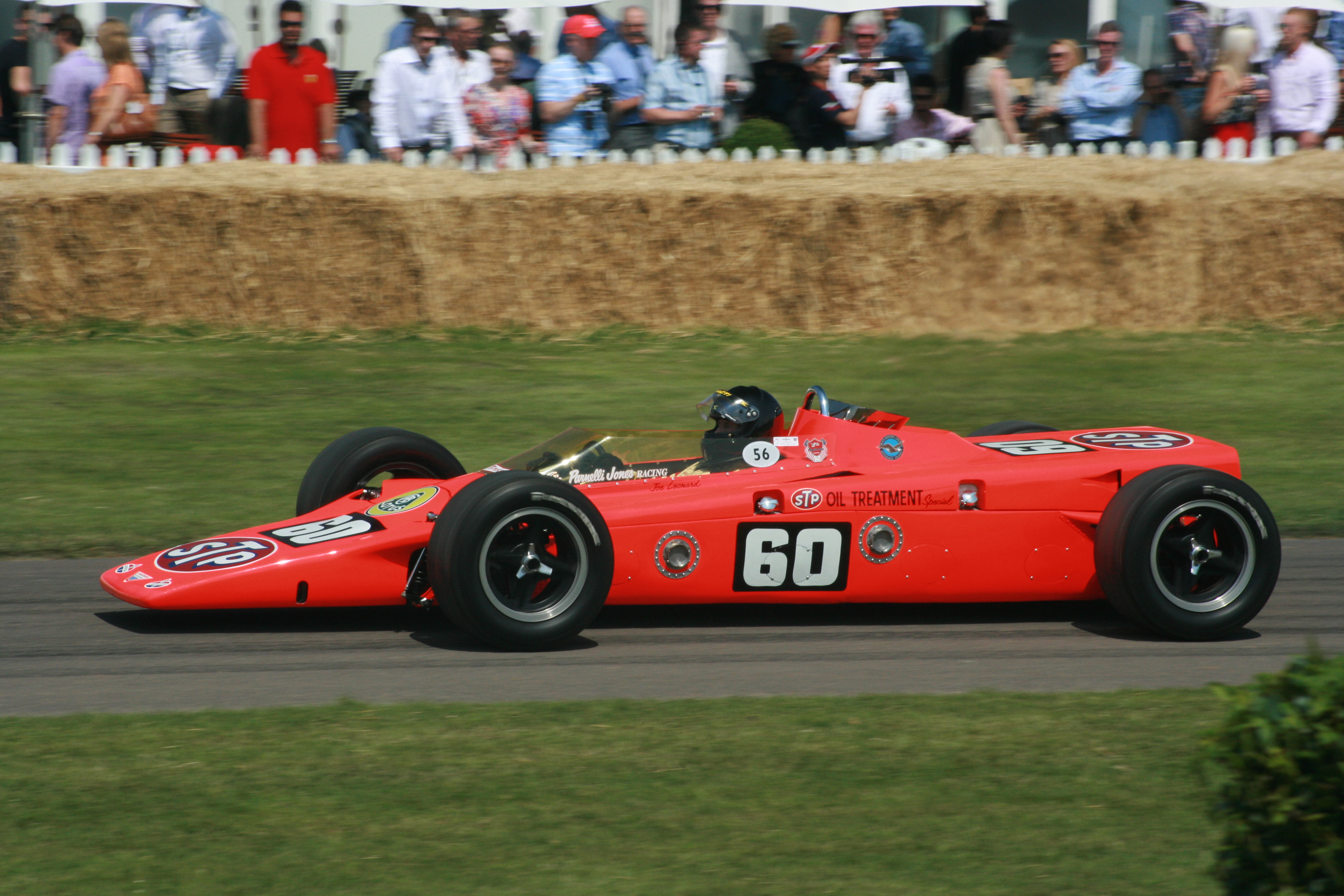
The Lotus 56 Leonard drove in the 1968 Indianapolis 500 (pictured in 2011).

In 1968, Leonard started the season in the #9 Vel's Ford Sales Morris-Ford for Vel's Parnelli Jones Racing. Leonard finished in third place at the Stardust 150 at Stardust International Raceway. This would end up being his best finish of the season. At the Indianapolis 500, Leonard drove for STP-Granatelli Racing. He first drove the #40 STP Oil Treatment Granatelli-Pratt & Whitney Canada PT6 but crashed that car in practice. As a result, drove the #60 STP Oil Treatment Lotus 56-Pratt & Whitney Canada PT6 in place of the injured Jackie Stewart. Leonard qualified on the pole position at a new track record speed of 171.599 mph. Leonard led the race for 31 laps, battling with Bobby Unser and Lloyd Ruby. He was the leader under a yellow flag with less than ten laps to go, but when the race restarted on lap 191 Leonard's fuel shaft broke. His teammate Art Pollard, who had been running three laps behind at the time, had the same thing happen to him. Leonard coasted to a stop and finished in 12th place as Unser took the victory.

For the remainder of the season, Leonard would usually qualify well, including a pole position at California 200 at Hanford Motor Speedway, but results weren't on his side as his best finish was only a sixth place at the second heat of the Telegraph Trophy 200 at Mosport Park. He finished 21st in points. Leonard was without a car to drive at the beginning of 1969 before legendary car builder Smokey Yunick hired him to drive his #44 City of Daytona Beach Eagle-Ford at the Indianapolis 500 where he finished in sixth place.

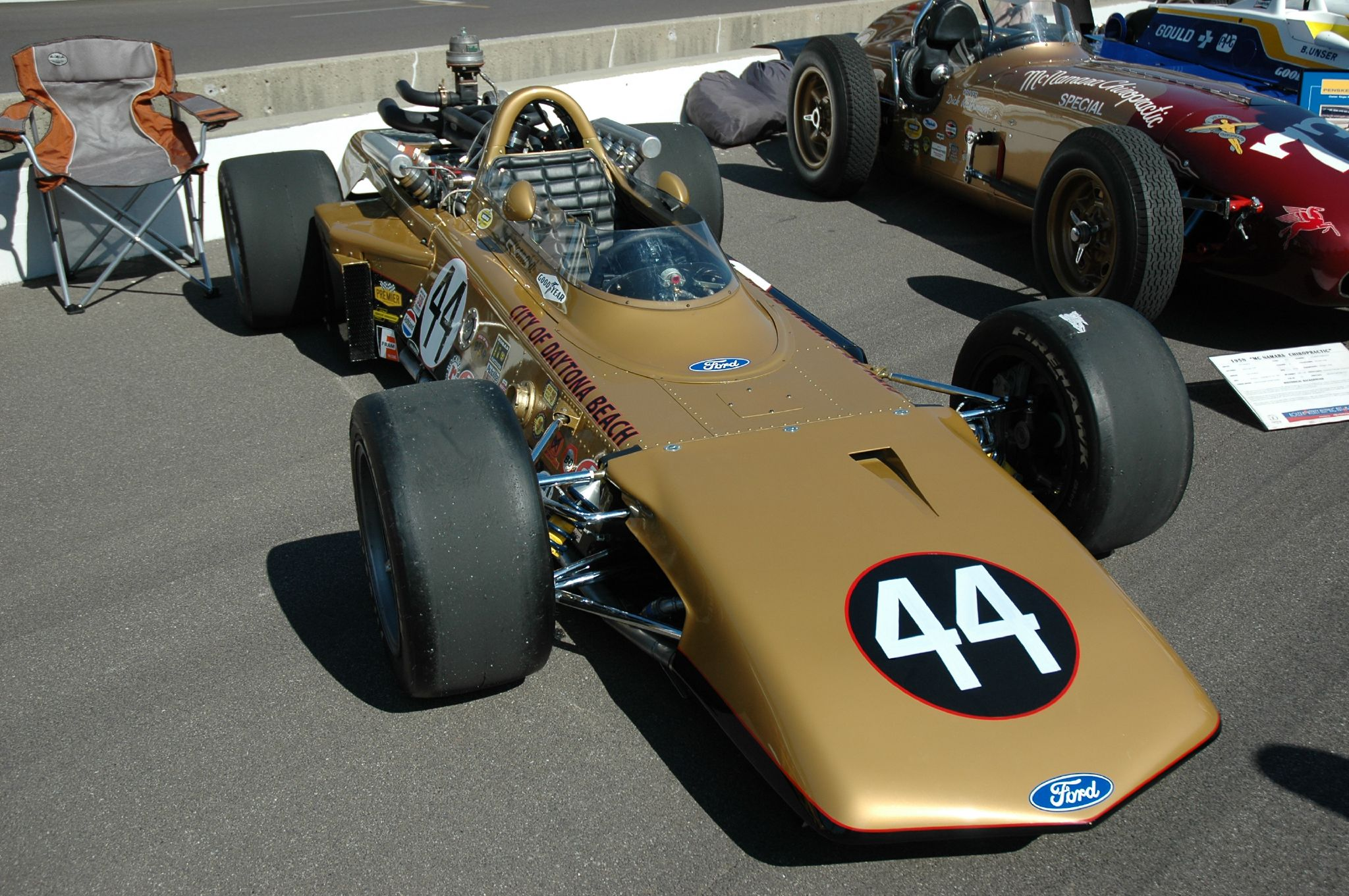
The Eagle driven to sixth place by Leonard in the 1969 Indianapolis 500.

After Indianapolis, Leonard was without a car yet again. He first drove for Gene White in the #4 Wynn's SpitFire Mongoose-Offenhauser at the Trenton 200 at Trenton International Speedway where he finished in 19th place after suffering a broken oil line. He then briefly reunited with STP-Granatelli Racing in the #40 STP Oil Treartment Lotus-Offenhauser at the Tony Bettenhausen 200 at Wisconsin State Fairgrounds Park and the Delaware 200 at Dover Downs International Speedway. He qualified third at Milwaukee but finishED 20th in that race and 21st at Dover. Leonard got one more driving gig that season at Vel's Parnelli Jones Racing in the #3 Vel's Parnelli Ford Lola-Ford for four races, getting a best finish of fifth at the Bobby Ball Memorial at Phoenix International Raceway. He finished 21st in points.

Leonard returned to Vel's Parnelli Jones again in 1970, working with famed chief mechanic George Bignotti. In his first race of the year, the Indianapolis 500 he drove the #15 Johnny Lightning PJ Colt-Ford. In the race, Leonard qualified in 18th place and was soon running in second place to teammate Unser. Leonard's engine quit after 73 laps and he could only finish in 24th place. It was discovered post-race the engine switch had been flipped, meaning that there was nothing wrong with the engine and that Leonard could have continued. Leonard then competed in the Rex Mays Classic at Wisconsin State Fairgrounds Park Speedway where he only led the final nine laps on his way to his first victory since 1965 at Milwaukee. Leonard started one more race that year, the California 500 at Ontario Motor Speedway, where he qualified in sixth place and finished in 13th place after spinning out. Leonard finished the season 32nd in points.

==== Championship years ====
In 1971, Leonard became a full-time driver at Vel's Parnelli Jones. When the season started, Leonard had no sponsor on his #15 Vel's Parnelli Jones Racing PJ Colt-Ford for the season-opening pair of races, the Rafaela Indy 300 at Autódromo Ciudad de Rafaela. At the Phoenix 150 at Phoenix International Raceway, the car was sponsored by Johnny Lightning, the same sponsor of teammate Al Unser. In the first three races of the season, Leonard was a model of consistency with finishes of sixth, third and fourth. Starting with the Trenton 200 at Trenton International Speedway, the car got sponsorship from Samsonite.

At the Indianapolis 500, Leonard battled with teammate Unser for the lead. Leonard eventually led for 21 laps before retiring with a broken turbocharger. Leonard then got back-to-back second-place finishes at the Rex Mays Classic 150 at Wisconsin State Fairgrounds Park Speedway and the Pocono 500 at Pocono International Raceway; in the latter Leonard battled with Mark Donohue for the win, until Leonard stretched his fuel hose during his final pit stop. Leonard won the California 500 at Ontario Motor Speedway. Leonard clinched the championship at the next to last race of the season, the Trenton 300 at Trenton International Speedway, with a third-place finish.

In 1972, Leonard became part of a Super Team at Vel's Parnelli Jones with Unser and Mario Andretti. He originally drove the #1 Samsonite PJ Colt-Offenhauser at the season-opening Jimmy Bryan 150 at Phoenix International Raceway. Starting with the Trentonian 200 at Trenton International Speedway, Leonard drove a Parnelli VPJ1-Offenhauser. The car was originally equipped with dihedral wings on the front. These were eventually scrapped by the time of the Indianapolis 500. The team was then struggling to remain competitive with the new designs from All American Racers and Team McLaren. The team then got the car set up right for all three and Leonard qualified in sixth place and finished in third place. He had a three-race winning streak at the Michigan 200 at Michigan International Speedway, the Pocono 500 at Pocono International Raceway and the Tony Bettenhausen 200 at Wisconsin State Fairgrounds Park Speedway. Leonard clinched his second consecutive championship at the California 500 at Ontario Motor Speedway.

==== Downturn ====
In 1973, Leonard returned to Vel's Parnelli Jones, driving the #1 Samsonite Parnelli VPJ-2-Offenhauser. The season was a struggle for Leonard as he could only get a best finish of fifth place at the season-opening Texas 200 at Texas World Speedway and the second heat of the Trentonian 300 at Trenton International Speedway. At the Indianapolis 500, Leonard struggled to qualify after teammates Andretti and Unser qualified sixth and eighth. He eventually qualified in 29th place and finish in 18th place due to a broken hub. Leonard finished the season 15th in points.

==== Injury and attempted comeback ====
By 1974, Vel's Parnelli Jones was in trouble. Of their three cars from 1973, only Andretti in fifth place would make the top-ten. They lost their Samsonite sponsorship at year's end and Firestone (Vel's Parnelli Jones tire supplier since their debut in the 1967 USAC Championship Car season) was cutting back their racing funding as well, eventually pulling out completely at the end of the year. Leonard drove the #16 Vel's Parnelli Ford Eagle-Offenhauser. At the season-opening heat races that made up the 1974 California 500 at Ontario Motor Speedway he finished in fourth place.

A week later in the main race, after completing 146 laps, a rear tire blew on the main stretch heading into turn one. The car veered across the track into the pit wall on the inside, then careened back across the track and hit the outside wall in turn one. He suffered a gash above his left eye and a compound fracture to his left ankle. Since Leonard's injuries occurred before the orthopedic reconstruction methods pioneered by motorsports physician Dr. Terry Trammell, he was left debilitated. He finished 30th in points. A year later in 1975, Leonard attempted to make a comeback at the California 500 at Ontario Motor Speedway for Gilmore Racing in the #10 Gilmore Racing Coyote-Foyt. He ended up failing USAC's physical, ending his career.

=== NASCAR career ===
In 1969, after signing with Smokey Yunick for the Indianapolis 500, Leonard drove the #13 Smokey Yunick Ford Torino Talladega at the Firecracker 400 at Daytona International Speedway. Leonard crashed out after 47 laps and finish in 31st place after starting in 12th place. Due to racing with a USAC license he was unable to score points in the NASCAR Grand National Series, going unranked (a rule that no longer exists). Yunick would write in his autobiography that, "if there (was) such a thing as a natural born racer, (Leonard was) it. He liked to go fast, very fast and knew how to do it."

=== After racing ===
In 1991, Leonard was inducted into the Motorsports Hall of Fame of America in the Motorcycles category. In 1998, he was inducted into the A.M.A. Motorcycle Hall of Fame. In 2001, he was inducted into the San Jose Sports Hall of Fame.

== Complete USAC Championship Car results ==
Year	1	2	3	4	5	6	7	8	9	10	11	12	13	14	15	16	17	18	19	20	21	22	23	24	25	26	27	28	Pos	Points
1964	PHX	TRE	INDY	MIL	LAN	TRE	SPR	MIL	DUQ; 14	ISF; 12	TRE; 24	SAC; 15	PHX; 5																24th	210
1965	PHX	TRE	INDY; 29	MIL; 2	LAN; 19	PIP	TRE; 5	IRP; 10	ATL; Wth	LAN	MIL; 1	SPR	MIL; 5	DUQ	ISF	TRE; 2	SAC	PHX; 4											6th	1.415
1966	PHX; 14	TRE	INDY; 9	MIL; 3	LAN; 3	ATL; 21	PIP	IRP; 8	LAN; Wth	SPR; 4	MIL; 3	DUQ; 4	ISF; DNQ	TRE; DNQ	SAC	PHX; 5													4th	1.275
1967	PHX; 4	TRE; 14	INDY; 3	MIL; 8	LAN; 7	PIP	MOS; 10	MOS; 8	IRP	LAN; DNQ	MTR; 6	MTR; 6	SPR	MIL; 5	DUQ	ISF	TRE; 17	SAC	HAN; 7	PHX; 24	RIV; 16								9th	1.575
1968	HAN; 22	LVG; 3	PHX; 22	TRE; 8	INDY; 12	MIL; 18	MOS; 7	MOS; 6	LAN	PIP	CDR; 8	NAZ	IRP; 14	IRP; DNS	LAN	LAN	MTR	MTR	SPR	MIL; 16	DUQ	ISF	TRE	SAC	MCH	HAN; 4	PHX	RIV; 17	20th	850
1969	PHX	HAN	INDY; 6	MIL	LAN	PIP	CDR	NAZ	TRE; 19	IRP	IRP	MIL; 20	SPR	DOV; 21	DUQ	ISF	BRN	BRN	TRE; 27	SAC	KEN; DNS	KEN	PHX; 5	RIV; 19					20th	600
1970	PHX	SON	TRE	INDY; 24	MIL; 1	LAN	CDR	MCH	IRP	SPR	MIL	ONT; 13	DUQ	ISF	SED	TRE	SAC	PHX											29th	300
1971	RAF; 6	RAF; 3	PHX; 4	TRE; 24	INDY; 19	MIL; 2	POC; 2	MCH; 19	MIL; DNQ	ONT; 1	TRE; 3	PHX; 10																	1st	3.015
1972	PHX; 5	TRE; 4	INDY; 3	MIL; 5	MCH; 1	POC; 1	MIL; 1	ONT; 15	TRE; 3	PHX; DNQ																			1st	3.460
1973	TWS; 5	TRE; 13	TRE; 5	INDY; 18	MIL; 7	POC; 8	MCH; 23	MIL; 7	ONT; 9	ONT	ONT; 21	MCH; 12	MCH; 7	TRE; 9	TWS; 19	PHX; 15													15th	1.018
1974	ONT	ONT; 4	ONT; 19	PHX	TRE	INDY	MIL	POC	MCH	MIL	MCH	TRE	TRE	PHX															30th	120
1975	ONT	ONT; DNP	ONT	PHX	TRE	INDY	MIL	POC	MCH	MIL	MCH	TRE	PHX																-	0

== Indianapolis 500 results ==
Year	Chassis	Engine	Start	Finish
1965	Halibrand	Ford	27th	29th
1966	Eagle	Ford	20th	9th
1967	Coyote	Ford	5th	3rd
1968	Lotus 56	Pratt & Whitney	1st	12th
1969	Eagle	Ford	11th	6th
1970	PJ Colt	Ford	18th	24th
1971	PJ Colt	Ford	8th	19th
1972	Parnelli	Offenhauser	6th	3rd
1973	Parnelli	Offenhauser	29th	18th
