= 1972 USAC Championship Car season =

Sports season

- USAC National Championship Trail

Season
- Races: 10
- Start date: March 18
- End date: November 4

Awards
- National champion: (United States) Joe Leonard
- Indianapolis 500 winner: (United States) Mark Donohue

The 1972 USAC Championship Car season consisted of ten races, beginning in Avondale, Arizona on March 18 and concluding at the same location on November 4. The USAC National Champion was Joe Leonard and the Indianapolis 500 winner was Mark Donohue. Jim Malloy was killed at Indianapolis in practice; he was 40 years old.

After sponsoring the USAC Championship Trail in 1970–1971, Marlboro dropped out of the sport for 1972. After only two seasons as title sponsor, the company became angered when rival Viceroy was signed on to sponsor Vel's Parnelli Jones Racing, at the time dubbed the "super team" of the series. Without any exclusivity clause, managers at Marlboro deemed the situation "impractical and untenable," and abruptly quit. Marlboro would not return to Indy car racing until 1986.

== Entrants ==
(partial list)

Team	Chassis	Engine	Drivers	Rounds
(United States) A.J. Foyt Enterprises	Coyote	Foyt	(United States) A.J. Foyt	1, 3, 8–10
(United States) A.J. Foyt Enterprises	Lola (4), Coyote (5, 8)	Foyt	(United States) Sam Sessions	4–5, 8
(United States) All American Racers	Eagle	Offenhauser	(United States) Bobby Unser	All
(United States) Andy Granatelli	Lola	Foyt	(United States) Wally Dallenbach	3–10
(United States) Gene White Racing	Lola	Foyt	(United States) Sam Sessions	3
(United States) Gerhardt	Gerhardt (4, 7), Eagle (5–6, 8–10)	Offenhauser	(United States) Johnny Rutherford	4–10
(United States) Jerry O'Connell Racing	Eagle	Offenhauser	(United States) Bill Vukovich II	All
(United States) Leader Card Racing	Eagle	Offenhauser	(United States) Mike Mosley	1–4, 8–10
(United States) Lindsey Hopkins Racing	Kuzma (1–2, 4, 7, 9); Antares (3); McLaren (5–6, 8, 10)	Offenhauser	(United States) Roger McCluskey	All
(United States) Lindsey Hopkins Racing	Eagle	Offenhauser	(United States) Wally Dallenbach	1–2
(United States) Lindsey Hopkins Racing	Eagle (1, 4–5, 8–10); Kuzma (2); Coyote (3, 6–7)	Foyt (1–7); Offenhauser (8–10)	(United States) Mel Kenyon	All
(United Kingdom) McLaren	McLaren	Offenhauser	(United States) Gordon Johncock	2–3, 5–9
(United States) Page Racing	Eagle (1–6, 9–10); McLaren (8)	Offenhauser	(United States) Mike Hiss	1–6, 8–10
(United States) Patrick Racing	Eagle (1–2); Brabham (3)	Offenhauser	(United States) Johnny Rutherford	1–3
(United States) Patrick Racing	Eagle (1–4, 7); Brabham (5–6, 8–10)	Offenhauser	(United States) Swede Savage	All
(United States) Team Penske	McLaren	Offenhauser	(United States) Mark Donohue	1–4, 9–10
(United States) Team Penske	McLaren	Offenhauser	(United States) Gary Bettenhausen	1–7
(United States) Vel's Parnelli Jones Racing	Colt (1), Parnelli (2–10)	Offenhauser	(United States) Joe Leonard	All
(United States) Vel's Parnelli Jones Racing	Colt (1), Parnelli (2–10)	Offenhauser	(United States) Al Unser	All
(United States) Vel's Parnelli Jones Racing	Colt (1), Parnelli (2–10)	Offenhauser	(United States) Mario Andretti	All

== Schedule and results ==
All races running on Oval/Speedway.

Rnd	Date	Race name	Track	Location	Pole position	Winning driver
1	March 18	Jimmy Bryan 150	Phoenix International Raceway	Avondale, Arizona	(United States) Bobby Unser	(United States) Bobby Unser
2	April 23	Trentonian 200	Trenton International Speedway	Trenton, New Jersey	(United States) Bobby Unser	(United States) Gary Bettenhausen
3	May 27	International 500 Mile Sweepstakes	Indianapolis Motor Speedway	Speedway, Indiana	(United States) Bobby Unser	(United States) Mark Donohue
4	June 4	Rex Mays Classic	Wisconsin State Fair Park Speedway	West Allis, Wisconsin	(United States) Bobby Unser	(United States) Bobby Unser
5	July 16	Michigan 200	Michigan International Speedway	Brooklyn, Michigan	(United States) Bobby Unser	(United States) Joe Leonard
6	July 29^{A}	Schaefer 500	Pocono International Raceway	Long Pond, Pennsylvania	(United States) Bobby Unser	(United States) Joe Leonard
7	August 13	Tony Bettenhausen 200	Wisconsin State Fair Park Speedway	West Allis, Wisconsin	(United States) Mario Andretti	(United States) Joe Leonard
8	September 3	California 500	Ontario Motor Speedway	Ontario, California	(United States) Jerry Grant	(United States) Roger McCluskey
9	September 24	Trenton 300	Trenton International Speedway	Trenton, New Jersey	(United States) Bobby Unser	(United States) Bobby Unser
10	November 4	Best Western 150	Phoenix International Raceway	Avondale, Arizona	(United States) Mark Donohue	(United States) Bobby Unser

^A Originally scheduled for July 2, postponed because of rain.

In the fall of 1971, a tentative schedule held the possibility of returning road courses to the championship schedule. Races at Colorado, Brainerd, Bridgehampton, Road Atlanta, Mosport, as well as a return to Rafaela, Argentina, and a new "Florida 500" at the proposed "Florida International Raceway", were all part of an early press release. However, all road courses were ultimately left off, the Argentina race was discontinued, and the Florida race course was never built.

== Final points standings ==
Note: Peter Revson is not eligible for points.

Pos	Driver	PHX	TRE	INDY	MIL	MIS	POC	MIL	ONT	TRE	PHX	Pts
1	(United States) Joe Leonard	5	4	3	5	1	1	1	16	3	DNQ	3460
2	(United States) Bill Vukovich II	20	18	28	4	11	4	2	3	4	15	2200
3	(United States) Roger McCluskey	7	2	24	7	8	11	19	1	8	6	1970
4	(United States) Al Unser	6	20	2	19	15	3	15	31	23	4	1800
5	(United States) Mark Donohue	17	19	1	2					2	**16**	1720
6	(United States) Mike Hiss RY	10	7	7	13	26	6		2	14	DNQ	1665
7	(United States) Johnny Rutherford	13	Wth	27	21	16	2	3	10	6	5	1620
8	(United States) Bobby Unser	**1**	**17**	**30**	**1**	**14**	**20**	Wth	24	**1**	1	1500
9	(United States) Sam Sessions			4		4	15		4			1440
10	(United States) Mike Mosley	3	13	26	DNQ				5	5	2	1250
11	(United States) Mario Andretti	2	22	8	8	12	7	**11**	27	28	3	1135
12	(United States) Gary Bettenhausen	4	1	14	3	24	19	DNQ				790
13	(United States) Wally Dallenbach Sr.	9	6	15	DNQ	2	14	DNQ	21	7	24	720
14	(United States) Salt Walther		11	33		DNQ	8		6	27		690
15	(United States) Lee Kunzman	22		17	18	5	9	4	26	12	23	670
16	(United States) George Snider	16	DNQ	11	23	6	21	18	8	10	10	517
17	(United States) Sam Posey			5			5		19			500
18	(United States) Lloyd Ruby	21		6	22		26	DNQ	17	18	7	490
19	(United States) Mel Kenyon	23	10	18	15	3	13	16	28	11	9	460
20	(United States) Art Pollard	14		Wth					7	9	11	450
21	(United States) Jimmy Caruthers			9	12	22	10		12			415
22	(United States) Gordon Johncock		3	20		9	22	22	13	20		360
23	(United States) Rick Muther			DNQ	24	20	12	5	15		22	250
24	(United States) Jim Malloy	15	5	Wth								200
25	(United States) Swede Savage	19	16	32	6	17	23	9	20	19	19	200
26	(United States) Dick Simon	18	14	13	9	7	16	12		16	14	200
27	(United States) Bill Simpson	24		DNQ		13	24	24	9		17	200
28	(United States) Johnny Parsons							6	22	17	DNS	160
29	(United States) Cale Yarborough			10					DNQ			150
30	(United States) John Mahler		8	22	11		27	25	18			130
31	(United States) Jerry Grant			12	20				**33**	21	8	125
32	(United States) Tom Bigelow			Wth		21	DNQ	7		13		120
33	(United States) Steve Krisiloff		12	21		18	32	14	11	15	18	120
34	(United States) John Hubbard R							8				100
35	(United States) Al Loquasto		9	DNQ			DNQ		DNQ			80
36	(United States) A. J. Foyt	8		25					30	22	21	75
37	(United States) Bentley Warren		DNQ	DNQ	14		18	10		26	20	60
38	(United States) Lee Brayton R			DNQ		10	DNQ	17	DNQ			60
39	(United States) Jim McElreath		DNQ	DNQ	10		DNQ		DNS			45
40	(Canada) George Eaton	11										30
41	(United States) Jim Hurtubise	12	21	23	DNQ	23	DNQ					15
42	(United States) Greg Weld						33		DNQ		12	6
-	(United States) John Martin			16	17		17	20	32		13	0
-	(United States) Dee Jones							13				0
-	(United States) Carl Williams			29	16		30		14			0
-	(United States) Joe Tetz R		15					23				0
-	(United States) Larry McCoy R		DNQ			19		21		24		0
-	(United States) Denny Zimmerman			19			25		25			0
-	(United States) Peter Revson			31			31		23			0
-	(United States) Gig Stephens		23									0
-	(United States) Merle Bettenhausen			DNQ		25						0
-	(United States) Arnie Knepper			DNQ						25		0
-	(United States) Jerry Karl			DNQ				28		29		0
-	(United States) Bob Harkey			DNQ			29					0
-	(United States) George Follmer								DNS			0
-	(United States) Larry Dickson			DNQ			DNQ					0
-	(United Kingdom) David Hobbs						DNQ					0
-	(Canada) Eldon Rasmussen						DNQ					0
-	(United States) Bruce Walkup			DNQ								0
-	(United States) Jigger Sirois			DNQ								0
-	(United States) Bill Puterbaugh			Wth								0
-	(United States) Bud Tingelstad			Wth								0
Pos	Driver	PHX	TRE	INDY	MIL	MIS	POC	MIL	ONT	TRE	PHX	Pts

Color	Result
Gold	Winner
Silver	2nd place
Bronze	3rd place
Green	4th & 5th place
Light Blue	6th-10th place
Dark Blue	Finished (Outside Top 10)
Purple	Did not finish (Ret)
Red	Did not qualify (DNQ)
Brown	Withdrawn (Wth)
Black	Disqualified (DSQ)
White	Did not start (DNS)
Blank	Did not participate (DNP)
Blank	Not competing

**In-line notation**
**Bold**	Pole position
Italics	Ran fastest race lap
*	Led most race laps
RY Rookie of the Year
R Rookie

== See also ==
- 1972 Indianapolis 500
