= Parnelli VPJ2 =

Parnelli VPJ-2
- Category: USAC IndyCar
- Constructor: Vel's Parnelli Jones Racing
- Designer(s): Maurice Phillippe
- Predecessor: Parnelli VPJ1
- Successor: Parnelli VPJ6

Technical specifications
- Chassis: Aluminum Monocoque
- Suspension: Inboard springs and Fox shocks front and rear, operated by top rocker arm with front and lower rear A arms of streamline tubing
- Engine: Offenhauser 159 cu in (2,605.5 cc) I-4 Mid-engined, longitudinally mounted
- Transmission: Hewland L.G. Mk.II 4-speed manual
- Weight: 1,550 lb (703.1 kg)
- Fuel: Methanol
- Tyres: Firestone Speedway Specials - Rear 27.0x14.5-15 - Front 25.5x10.0-15

Competition history
- Notable drivers: Al Unser; Mario Andretti; Jan Opperman

The Parnelli VPJ2 is an open-wheel race car, designed by British designer and engineer Maurice Phillippe for Vel's Parnelli Jones Racing, to compete in U.S.A.C. Championship Car, between 1973 and 1974. It was driven by Jan Opperman, Mario Andretti, and Al Unser. It was powered by an Offenhauser four-cylinder turbo engine, reputed to develop between 800–1,300 hp (600–970 kW), depending on turbo boost pressure levels. It won two races; one for Unser at Texas, and one for Andretti at Trenton.
