= Roger McCluskey =

American racing driver (1930–1993)

- Born: Roger Frank McCluskey; August 24, 1930 San Antonio, Texas, U.S.
- Died: August 29, 1993 (aged 63) Indianapolis, Indiana, U.S.

Championship titles
- USAC Sprint Car (1963, 1966); USAC Stock Car (1969, 1970); USAC Championship Car (1973); Major victories California 500 (1972)

Champ Car career
- 229 races run over 21 years
- Best finish: 1st (1973)
- First race: 1960 Langhorne 100 (Langhorne)
- Last race: 1979 Tony Bettenhausen 200 (Milwaukee)
- First win: 1966 Langhorne 150 (Langhorne)
- Last win: 1979 Tony Bettenhausen 200 (Milwaukee)
Wins	Podiums	Poles
5	30	3

AAA/USAC Stock Car career
- Years active: 1968–1979
- Championships: 2
- Best finish: 1st in 1969, 1970

NASCAR Cup Series career
- 4 races run over 4 years
- First race: 1969 Motor Trend 500 (Riverside)
- Last race: 1977 Los Angeles Times 500 (Ontario)
Wins	Top tens	Poles
0	1	0

24 Hours of Le Mans career
- Years: 1967
- Teams: Holman-Moody
- Best finish: DNF (1967)
- Class wins: 0

Roger Frank McCluskey (August 24, 1930 – August 29, 1993) was an American IndyCar driver. He was raised in Tucson, Arizona.

McCluskey won championship titles in three divisions of the United States Auto Club: Sprints, Stocks, and Champ Cars. He won the USAC Sprint Car title in 1963 and 1966, the USAC Stock Car title in 1969 and 1970 and the USAC Championship Car (national) title in 1973. His first USAC Stock Car start resulted in a runner-up finish in Phoenix, Arizona in January 1968, when he drove as a substitute driver for Norm Nelson.

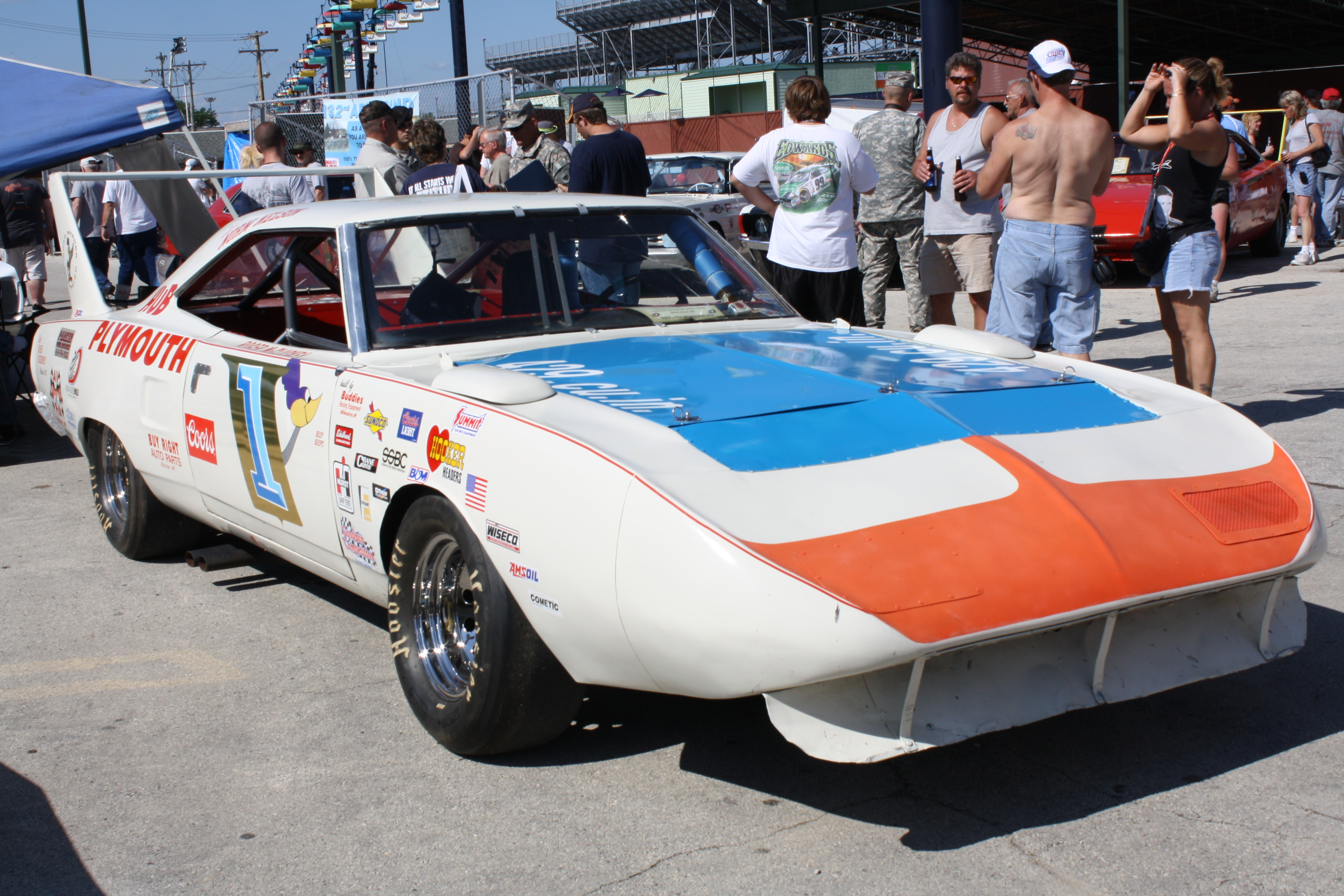
Plymouth Superbird driven by McCluskey in 1970

McCluskey earned four USAC Midget Car wins, 23 USAC Sprint Car wins, 23 USAC Stock Car wins and five USAC Championship Car wins (including his last start at Milwaukee in 1979, which is a rarity since most drivers don't win their last race in their career). He started every Indianapolis 500 race from 1961 to 1979 except 1964, with a best finish of 3rd in 1973.

McCluskey also made four NASCAR Grand National Series starts from 1969 to 1977 with a best finish of second in 1970 at Riverside International Raceway.

McCluskey represented the USAC series in the 1974 International Race of Champions.

McCluskey raced for the Holman and Moody team in a Ford GT40 Mk.IIB at the 1967 24 Hours of Le Mans in France. During this event, McCluskey is credited with pulling Mario Andretti to safety-and thus saving his life-after Andretti had seriously crashed his Ford GT40 Mk.IV when a front brake locked.

McCluskey died of cancer in Indianapolis, on August 29, 1993, just five days after his 63rd birthday. In 2004, the local United Sports Arizona Race Park hosted the Roger McCluskey Sprint Car Classic in his honor.

== Award ==
McCluskey was inducted in the National Sprint Car Hall of Fame in 1993.

McCluskey was also inducted into the Indianapolis Motor Speedway Hall of Fame in 2002.

McCluskey was inducted into the Motorsports Hall of Fame of America in 2011.

== Racing record ==
=== Complete USAC Championship Car results ===
Year	Team	1	2	3	4	5	6	7	8	9	10	11	12	13	14	15	16	17	18	19	20	21	22	23	24	25	26	27	28	Pos	Points
1956	Harry Allen Chapman	INDY	MIL	LAN	DAR	ATL	SPR	MIL	DUQ	SYR	ISF	SAC; DNQ	PHX																	-	0
1960	Art Koopman	TRE	INDY	MIL; DNQ	LAN; 5	SPR; 13	MIL; DNQ	DUQ; 15																						19th	320
1960	Harlan Fike								SYR; DNQ	ISF; 6	TRE; 11	SAC; 4	PHX; DNQ																	19th	320
1961	Harlan Fike	TRE; 6			LAN; 5																									15th	370
1961	Racing Associates		INDY; 27	MIL; 17		MIL; DNQ	SPR				TRE; 7																			15th	370
1961	John R. Willis							DUQ; 15	SYR; 8	ISF; 14																				15th	370
1961	Fred Sclavi											SAC; 11	PHX; 7																	15th	370
1962	Fred Sclavi	TRE; 8	INDY; 16	MIL; 5	LAN; 14	TRE; DNQ																								12th	690
1962	Bruce Homeyer						SPR; 15	MIL; 6	LAN; 5	SYR; 6	ISF; 4	TRE; 21	SAC; 18	PHX; 6																12th	690
1963	Bruce Homeyer	TRE; 8	INDY; 15	MIL; 18	LAN; 10	TRE; 7	SPR; 4	MIL; 6	DUQ; 11																					8th	750
1963	Gordon Van Liew									ISF; 6	TRE; 18	SAC; 5	PHX; 5																	8th	750
1964	Gordon Van Liew	PHX; 2	TRE	INDY	MIL	LAN	TRE; DNS	SPR	MIL	DUQ	ISF	TRE; 8	SAC; 7	PHX; DNS																22nd	238
1965	All American Racers	PHX; 21	TRE	INDY; 30	MIL; 6	LAN; 13	PIP	TRE; 17	IRP; 3	ATL; 9	LAN; DNQ	MIL; 5	SPR	MIL; 4	DUQ		TRE; 4		PHX; 26											8th	1.060
1965	Bursac-Pusilo															ISF; DNS														8th	1.060
1965	W & W Enterprises																	SAC; 9												8th	1.060
1966	Lindsey Hopkins	PHX	TRE; 20	INDY; 13	MIL; 2	LAN; 6	ATL; 27	PIP	IRP; 22	LAN; 1	SPR; 14	MIL; 18	DUQ; 18	ISF; 14	TRE; 5	SAC; DNS	PHX; 11													12th	780
1967	Lindsey Hopkins	PHX; 2	TRE; 2	INDY; 19	MIL; 3	LAN; 17	PIP	MOS; 2	MOS; 2	IRP; 19	LAN; 21	MTR; 24	MTR	SPR; 13	MIL; 3	DUQ; 3	ISF; 8	TRE; 14	SAC; DNQ	HAN; 21	PHX; 21	RIV; 5								8th	1.620
1968	Lindsey Hopkins	HAN; 6	LVG; 12	PHX; 14	TRE; 16	INDY; 29	MIL; 20	MOS; 3	MOS; 14	LAN; 9	PIP	CDR; 17	NAZ	IRP; 19	IRP; 7	LAN; 22	LAN	MTR	MTR	SPR; 1	MIL; 23	DUQ; 5	ISF; 12	TRE; 2	SAC; 12	MCH; 25	HAN; 10	PHX; 11	RIV; 12	13th	1.228
1969	A. J. Foyt Enterprises	PHX; 14	HAN; 17	INDY; 14	MIL; 9	LAN	PIP	CDR; 5	NAZ	TRE; 21	IRP; 4	IRP; 18	MIL; 14	SPR; 15	DOV; 3	DUQ; 16	ISF; 15	BRN; 15	BRN	TRE; 2	SAC; DNQ	KEN	KEN	PHX; DNQ	RIV; 22					13th	1.090
1970	Hayhoe Racing	PHX; DNQ	SON	TRE; DNQ	INDY; 25	MIL; 2	LAN; Wth	CDR	MCH; 7	IRP; 9	SPR; DNP	MIL; 2	ONT; 25	DUQ	ISF		TRE; 5		PHX; 3											6th	1.380
1970	Maxson															SED; 10		SAC; 5												6th	1.380
1971	Grant King Racers	RAF; 5	RAF; 4																											13th	1.050
1971	Lindsey Hopkins			PHX; 22	TRE; 22	INDY; 9	MIL; 23	POC; 25	MCH; 3	MIL; 18	ONT; 28	TRE; 22	PHX; 2																	13th	1.050
1972	Lindsey Hopkins	PHX; 7	TRE; 2	INDY; 24	MIL; 7	MCH; 8	POC; 11	MIL; 19	ONT; 1	TRE; 8	PHX; 6																			3rd	1.970
1973	Lindsey Hopkins	TWS; 7	TRE; 8	TRE; 6	INDY; 3	MIL; 2	POC; 2	MCH; 1	MIL; 6	ONT; 2	ONT	ONT; 4	MCH; 4	MCH	TRE; 13	TWS; 18	PHX; 4													1st	3.075
1974	Lindsey Hopkins	ONT; 5	ONT	ONT; 8	PHX; 16	TRE	INDY; 16	MIL; 18	POC; 28	MCH; 16	MIL; 6	MCH; 13	TRE; 10	TRE; 16	PHX; 19															16th	555
1975	Lindsey Hopkins	ONT; 8	ONT	ONT; 13	PHX; DNQ	TRE; 7	INDY; 5	MIL; 8	POC; 4	MCH; 12	MIL; 19	MCH; 5	TRE; 6	PHX; 18																7th	1.675
1976	Lindsey Hopkins	PHX	TRE; DNQ	INDY; 30	MIL		MCH; 5	TWS; DNQ	TRE; 22	MIL; 6	ONT; 21	MCH; 10	TWS; 19	PHX; 5																11th	955
1976	James Bidwell					POC; 6																								11th	955
1977	Lindsey Hopkins	ONT; 22	PHX; 3	TWS; 17	TRE; 5	INDY; 8	MIL; 19	POC; 26	MOS; 11	MCH; 20	TWS; DNQ	MIL; 20	ONT; 22	MCH; 7	PHX; 5															11th	940
1978	Hodgdon Racing	PHX; 19	ONT; 20	TWS; 20		INDY; 25	MOS	MIL	POC	MCH	ATL	TWS	MIL						PHX; 13											35th	61
1978	Patrick Racing				TRE; 21									ONT; 24	MCH	TRE	SIL	BRH												35th	61
1979	Hodgdon Racing	ONT; 12	TWS	INDY; 13																										9th	716
1979	AMI Racing				MIL; 17	POC; 14	TWS; 4	MIL; 1																						9th	716

=== Complete USAC Mini-Indy Series results ===
Year	Entrant	1	2	3	4	5	6	7	8	Pos	Points
1977		TRE	MIL	MOS; DNS	PIR					-	-
1979		TEX1	IRP	MIL1; 22	POC	TEX2	MIL2	MIN1	MIN2	**52nd**	**3**

=== Complete PPG Indy Car World Series results ===
Year	Team	Chassis	Engine	1	2	3	4	5	6	7	8	9	10	11	12	13	14	Pos.	Pts
1979	Hodgdon Racing	McLaren	Cosworth	PHX	ATL	ATL	INDY; 13	TRE	TRE	MCH	MCH	WGL	TRE	ONT	MCH	ATL	PHX	-	0

=== Indy 500 results ===
Year	Car	Start	Qual	Rank	Finish	Laps	Led	Retired
1961	22	29	145.068	18	27	51	0	Crash FS
1962	17	9	147.759	9	16	168	3	Spun T2
1963	14	14	148.680	20	15	198	4	Spun T3
1965	25	23	155.186	18	30	18	0	Clutch
1966	8	21	159.271	22	13	129	0	Oil Leak
1967	12	22	165.563	7	19	165	0	Engine
1968	8	7	166.976	7	29	16	0	Oil Filter
1969	82	6	168.350	6	14	157	0	Split Header
1970	11	4	169.213	4	25	62	0	Suspension
1971	6	22	171.241	15	9	188	0	Flagged
1972	14	20	182.686	15	24	92	0	Valve
1973	3	14	191.929	17	3	131	0	Flagged
1974	1	27	181.004	23	16	141	0	Rear End
1975	15	22	183.964	17	5	167	0	Flagged
1976	7	13	186.499	6	30	8	0	Crash T3
1977	11	18	190.992	10	8	191	0	Flagged
1978	11	11	192.256	17	25	82	0	Clutch
1979	72	25	183.908	35	13	191	0	Flagged
**Totals**						2155	7	

Starts	18
Poles	0
Front Row	0
Wins	0
Top 5	2
Top 10	4
Retired	13

=== NASCAR ===
(key) (Bold – Pole position awarded by qualifying time. Italics – Pole position earned by points standings or practice time. * – Most laps led.)

==== Grand National Series ====
NASCAR Grand National Series results
Year	Team	No.	Make	1	2	3	4	5	6	7	8	9	10	11	12	13	14	15	16	17	18	19	20	21	22	23	24	25	26	27	28	29	30	31	32	33	34	35	36	37	38	39	40	41	42	43	44	45	46	47	48	49	50	51	52	53	54	NGNC	Pts	Ref
1969	Norm Nelson Racing	12	Plymouth	MGR	MGY	RSD; 22	DAY	DAY	DAY	CAR	AUG	BRI	ATL	CLB	HCY	GPS	RCH	NWS	MAR	AWS	DAR	BLV	LGY	CLT	MGR	SMR	MCH	KPT	GPS	NCF	DAY	DOV	TPN	TRN	BLV	BRI	NSV	SMR	ATL	MCH	SBO	BGS	AWS	DAR	HCY	RCH	TAL	CLB	MAR	NWS	CLT	SVH	AUG	CAR	JFC	MGR	TWS	NA	-	
1970	Norm Nelson Racing	1	Plymouth	RSD; 2	DAY	DAY	DAY	RCH	CAR	SVH	ATL	BRI	TAL	NWS	CLB	DAR	BLV	LGY	CLT	SMR	MAR	MCH	RSD	HCY	KPT	GPS	DAY	AST	TPN	TRN	BRI	SMR	NSV	ATL	CLB	ONA	MCH	TAL	BGS	SBO	DAR	HCY	RCH	DOV	NCF	NWS	CLT	MAR	MGR	CAR	LGY							NA	-	

==== Winston Cup Series ====
NASCAR Winston Cup Series results
Year	Team	No.	Make	1	2	3	4	5	6	7	8	9	10	11	12	13	14	15	16	17	18	19	20	21	22	23	24	25	26	27	28	29	30	31	NWCC	Pts	Ref
1972	Marcis Auto Racing	2	Dodge	RSD	DAY	RCH	ONT	CAR	ATL	BRI	DAR	NWS	MAR	TAL	CLT	DOV	MCH	RSD	TWS	DAY	BRI	TRN	ATL	TAL	MCH	NSV	DAR	RCH	DOV	MAR	NWS	CLT; 27	CAR	TWS	NA	-	
1977		74	Chevy	RSD	DAY	RCH	CAR	ATL	NWS	DAR	BRI	MAR	TAL	NSV	DOV	CLT	RSD	MCH	DAY	NSV	POC	TAL	MCH	BRI	DAR	RCH	DOV	MAR	NWS	CLT	CAR	ATL	ONT; 40		NA	-	

=== International Race of Champions ===
(key) (Bold – Pole position. * – Most laps led.)

International Race of Champions results
Season	Make	1	2	3	4	Pos.	Pts	Ref
1973–74	Porsche	RSD; 8	RSD; 11	RSD; 12	DAY	12th	-	

== Other references ==
- Patrick Finley; "McCluskey memorial race at local dirt track gaining momentum each year"; December 30, 2006; Arizona Daily Star; Retrieved January 15, 2007
- NASCAR and IROC statistics

Sporting positions
Preceded by A. J. Foyt	USAC Stock Car Champion; 1969–1970	Succeeded by Butch Hartman
