= 1974 Pocono 500 =

(United States) 1974 Pocono 500
Race details
- 8th round of the 1974 USAC Championship Car season
- Date: June 30, 1974
- Official name: 1974 Schaefer 500
- Location: Long Pond, Pennsylvania
- Course: Permanent racing facility 2.5 mi / 4.023 km
- Distance: 200 laps 500 mi / 804.672 km
- Weather: Temperatures up to 77 °F (25 °C); wind speeds up to 17 miles per hour (27 km/h)

Pole position
- Driver: (United States) Bobby Unser (All American Racers)
- Time: 182.5 mph

Podium
- First: (United States) Johnny Rutherford (McLaren)
- Second: (United States) Jimmy Caruthers (Fletcher Racing)
- Third: (United States) Gordon Johncock (Patrick Racing)

The 1974 Pocono 500, the 4th running of the event, was held at the Pocono Raceway in Long Pond, Pennsylvania, on Sunday, June 30, 1974. Branded as the 1974 Schaefer 500 for sponsorship reasons, the race was won by Johnny Rutherford, who one month earlier won the 1974 Indianapolis 500.

== Background ==
1974 was the first year that the California 500 was held in March, making the Pocono 500 the final leg in IndyCar's Triple Crown of 500 mile races. Scoring the most points in the three races carried a $1000 prize and a ring presented at an awards ceremony.

By 1974, several drivers criticized USAC over their lack of promotion for the Triple Crown. Shortly after Secretariat won the similar prize in horse racing, it was lamented that auto racing's Triple Crown was not similarly embraced. After Pocono's General Manager, Bill Marvel, left his position, promotion of the Crown was reduced and USAC neglected to even mention Roger McCluskey won the 1973 Crown in their media guide.

"The Triple Crown was one man's dream," Mario Andretti said in June 1974. "Since Bill Marvel isn't connected here anymore, the whole thing died. It has some definite meaning, but it has to be talked about."

"It is a good publicity thing," Mark Donohue said, "but it has to be promoted. Right now everybody is just trying to win the race at hand." In June 1974, Philadelphia Daily News writer Bill Fleischman wrote, "A few years ago, Joe Leonard was honored at a dinner in Philadelphia as the first Triple Crown Winner. Leonard said he hoped his sport's Triple Crown would soon be as prestigious as horse racing's established salute. It hasn't happened. And it won't until auto racing cares enough to promote what could be an exciting attention getter."

Bobby Unser won the California 500 in March. Johnny Rutherford won the Indianapolis 500. Two weeks later, Rutherford won again at the Milwaukee Mile.

Peter Revson, polesitter for the 1973 Schaefer 500, was killed in a testing crash ahead of the 1974 South African Grand Prix in late March.

== Practice ==
Practice started Wednesday. Gordon Johncock was fastest at 181.847 mph, Johnny Rutherford was second at 181.781 mph.

Thursday's practice was delayed three hours due to an overnight rain. Mario Andretti posted the fasted speed at 183.036 mph. AJ Foyt was second fastest at 182.897 mph. Billy Vukovich was the first driver to hit the wall when he spun in turn three. He strained his knee but returned to practice hours later in a backup car.

Friday's practice began at 9 a.m. Dick Simon, Larry McCoy, and Sammy Sessions were the first three cars on track. Shortly after Simon posted a speed of 173.021 mph, it began to thunder and heavy rain fell. The rain stopped at 11:30 and sun began to shine. Then a second storm came from the southwest and canceled practice for the day.

== Time Trials ==
Qualifying runs were a four-lap, ten-mile average speed. Bobby Unser won the pole at an average speed of 182.500 mph. Steve Krisiloff qualified second at 182.269 mph. Wally Dallenbach joined the front row at 182.020 mph. 28 cars posted qualifying speeds on day one. Rick Muther hit the wall in practice and the car was withdrawn.

A. J. Foyt had won the pole at the California 500 and Indianapolis 500, and looked to be a favorite to repeat at Pocono. No one had ever won the pole at all three 500 miles races in one year. On his first qualifying lap, Foyt's average speed was a blistering 185.759 mph. On his second lap, Foyt burned a piston, significantly slowed, and was waved back into the pits by his crew. His crew installed a new engine and Foyt went out for practice during a break in qualifying. Foyt hit a patch of oil on the track and spun in turn two which resulted in a broken universal joint, causing more repair time. With six minutes left in the qualifying session, the car driven by Tom Bigelow went out to attempt a qualifying run. After taking several warmup laps, the qualifying run started. After three slow laps, Bigelow's crew waived off the attempt, wasting several minutes. This aborted qualifying attempt angered Foyt greatly.

"That's really chicken shit. That's low life to go out there and use up that time, waste all those practice laps and then wave off after three qualifying laps. That's really chicken shit."

Pancho Carter was the last car to go on track as the qualifying session ended at 6 p.m. Foyt was the next car in line. "What does this mean? It means I'm going to have to start behind a bunch of idiots."

Sunday's second round of qualifying was completely rained out. The final day of qualifying was rescheduled for Thursday. A.J. Foyt qualified for the race at an average speed of 181.415 mph. Because his run came on the final day of time trials, Foyt started the race 29th. Larry Cannon and Johnny Parsons Jr failed to qualify for the race.

In 1973, USAC allowed 340 gallons of methanol fuel per car. For 1974, USAC rules allowed for only 280 gallons of fuel. Because of Pocono's long frontstretch, teams said their engines were running less efficiently than at Indianapolis. Teams estimated their car were getting 1.9 miles per gallon of fuel. Cars were forced to run less turbo boost pressure than allowed in order to improve the fuel economy to be able to make all 500 miles.

== Race ==
At the start of the race, third place starter, Wally Dallenbach, took the lead ahead of Bobby Unser. Unser repassed Dallenbach on lap four. Still looking for his first win at his home track, Mario Andretti took the lead on lap 10.

By the time of his first pit stop, Johnny Rutherford was fighting a poor handling car and spent over a minute in the pits while his crew made adjustments. This put him over a lap behind Andretti.

After climbing from 29th to 12th in 20 laps, defending Pocono 500 champion, AJ Foyt, brushed the wall in turn two and fell out of the race with a damaged suspension. On lap 25, third-place Al Unser ran out of fuel and a caution was thrown to tow him back to the pits.

Andretti led 57 laps before a slow pit stop on lap 72 caused by a stalled engine cost him a lap. Leading the race on lap 78, Gordon Johncock ran out of fuel and brought out another caution to be towed in.

On lap 121, John Martin stalled on track and brought out a caution. Rutherford had yet to pit and was able to catch up to the leaders under caution.

On lap 133, Bill Simpson blew an engine entering turn one and dropped oil on track. Following him was Mario Andretti, who spun in the oil, and hit the wall with the rear of the car.

On lap 155, Johnny Rutherford passed Bobby Unser to lead for the first time. One lap later, rookie Tom Sneva hit the turn one wall and brought out the sixth and final caution. Unser retook the lead when Rutherford pitted under caution. Unser had led a race high 74 laps, but was forced to run a low powered fuel setting to make the finish on the USAC limit of 280 gallons. Unser finished fifth, three laps behind the race winner.

Shortly after the restart, Wally Dallenbach passed Unser for the lead and appeared in control of the race. With 13 laps remaining, Dallenbach fell out of the race with a blown engine and handed the lead to Rutherford.

Johnny Rutherford beat Jimmy Caruthers by over a lap to win his first Pocono 500. Caruthers' second-place finish tied his best career finish. Rutherford won $92,700 in prize money. The average speed of the race was 156.701 mph, a race record that stood until 1989. Rutherford became the first driver to win Indianapolis and Pocono in the same year.

By finishing fifth, Bobby Unser scored enough points to win the USAC Triple Crown points title.

== Box score ==
Finish	Grid	No	Name	Entrant	Chassis	Engine	Laps	Time/Status	Led	Points
1	5	3	(United States) Johnny Rutherford	Team McLaren	McLaren M16C/D	Offenhauser	200	3:11:26.810	18	1000
2	10	21	(United States) Jimmy Caruthers	Fletcher Racing Team	Eagle	Offenhauser	199	Flagged	0	800
3	4	20	(United States) Gordon Johncock	Patrick Racing	Eagle 74	Offenhauser	199	Flagged	7	700
4	2	60	(United States) Steve Krisiloff	Patrick Racing	Eagle	Offenhauser	198	Flagged	4	600
5	1	48	(United States) Bobby Unser	All American Racers	Eagle 74	Offenhauser	197	Flagged	74	500
6	12	9	(United States) Lloyd Ruby	Unlimited Racing	Eagle	Offenhauser	197	Flagged	0	400
7	15	42	(United States) Bentley Warren	Lindsey Hopkins Racing	Eagle	Offenhauser	196	Flagged	0	300
8	19	4	(United States) Bill Vukovich II	Jerry O'Connell Racing	Eagle	Offenhauser	194	Flagged	0	250
9	33	58	(Canada) Eldon Rasmussen	Rasmussen Racing	Rascar	Foyt	192	Flagged	0	200
10	3	40	(United States) Wally Dallenbach	Patrick Racing	Eagle	Offenhauser	188	Engine	40	150
11	17	86	(United States) Al Loquasto	K&L Racing	McLaren M16B	Offenhauser	179	Flagged	0	100
12	27	63	(United States) Larry McCoy	Eastern Racing Associates	Rascar	Offenhauser	174	Flagged	0	50
13	7	24	(United States) Tom Sneva	Grant King Racers	King	Offenhauser	155	Crash	0	0
14	28	61	(United States) Lee Brayton	Eisenhour-Brayton Racing	Coyote	Foyt	151	Flagged	0	0
15	22	11	(United States) Pancho Carter	Fletcher Racing Team	Eagle	Offenhauser	146	Connecting rod	0	0
16	21	89	(United States) John Martin	Automotive Technology	McLaren M16B	Offenhauser	138	Flagged	0	0
17	8	5	(United States) Mario Andretti	Vel's Parnelli Jones Racing	Eagle	Offenhauser	132	Crash	57	0
18	16	18	(United States) Bill Simpson	American Kids Racers	Eagle	Offenhauser	131	Connecting rod	0	0
19	32	27	(United States) Tom Bigelow	Vollstedt Enterprises	Vollstedt	Offenhauser	108	Engine	0	0
20	26	77	(United States) Salt Walther	Dayton-Walther	McLaren M16C	Offenhauser	79	Transmission	0	0
21	9	98	(United States) Mike Mosley	Leader Card Racers	Eagle	Offenhauser	70	Turbocharger	0	0
22	6	15	(United States) Al Unser	Vel's Parnelli Jones Racing	Eagle	Offenhauser	64	Connecting rod	0	0
23	23	45	(United States) Jim McElreath	Don Gerhardt	Eagle	Offenhauser	46	Turbocharger	0	0
24	18	56	(United States) Jim Hurtubise	Gohr Racing	McLaren	Offenhauser	31	Ignition	0	0
25	31	82	(United States) George Snider	A. J. Foyt Enterprises	Coyote	Foyt	25	Radiator	0	0
26	25	26	(United States) Bob Harkey	Grant King Racers	King	Offenhauser	21	Overheating	0	0
27	29	14	(United States) A. J. Foyt	A. J. Foyt Enterprises	Coyote	Foyt	20	Upright	0	0
28	30	1	(United States) Roger McCluskey	Lindsey Hopkins Racing	Riley	Offenhauser	18	Overheating	0	0
29	13	44	(United States) Dick Simon	Dick Simon Racing	Eagle	Foyt	18	Manifold	0	0
30	20	30	(United States) Sammy Sessions	Smokey Yunick	Eagle	Chevrolet	15	Turbocharger	0	0
31	11	8	(United States) Gary Bettenhausen	Penske Racing	McLaren M16C	Offenhauser	9	Piston	0	0
32	24	76	(United States) Jerry Karl	Webster Racing	Eagle	Offenhauser	4	Connecting rod	0	0
33	14	51	(United States) Jan Opperman	Vel's Parnelli Jones Racing	Parnelli	Offenhauser	4	Overheating	0	0

== Broadcasting ==
For the second straight year, the Schaefer 500 was broadcast by ABC Wide World of Sports on July 6. Keith Jackson and Chris Economaki served as broadcasters. ABC paired the race telecast with Cliff Diving Championships from Acapulco.
