= Parnelli VPJ1 =

Parnelli VPJ-1
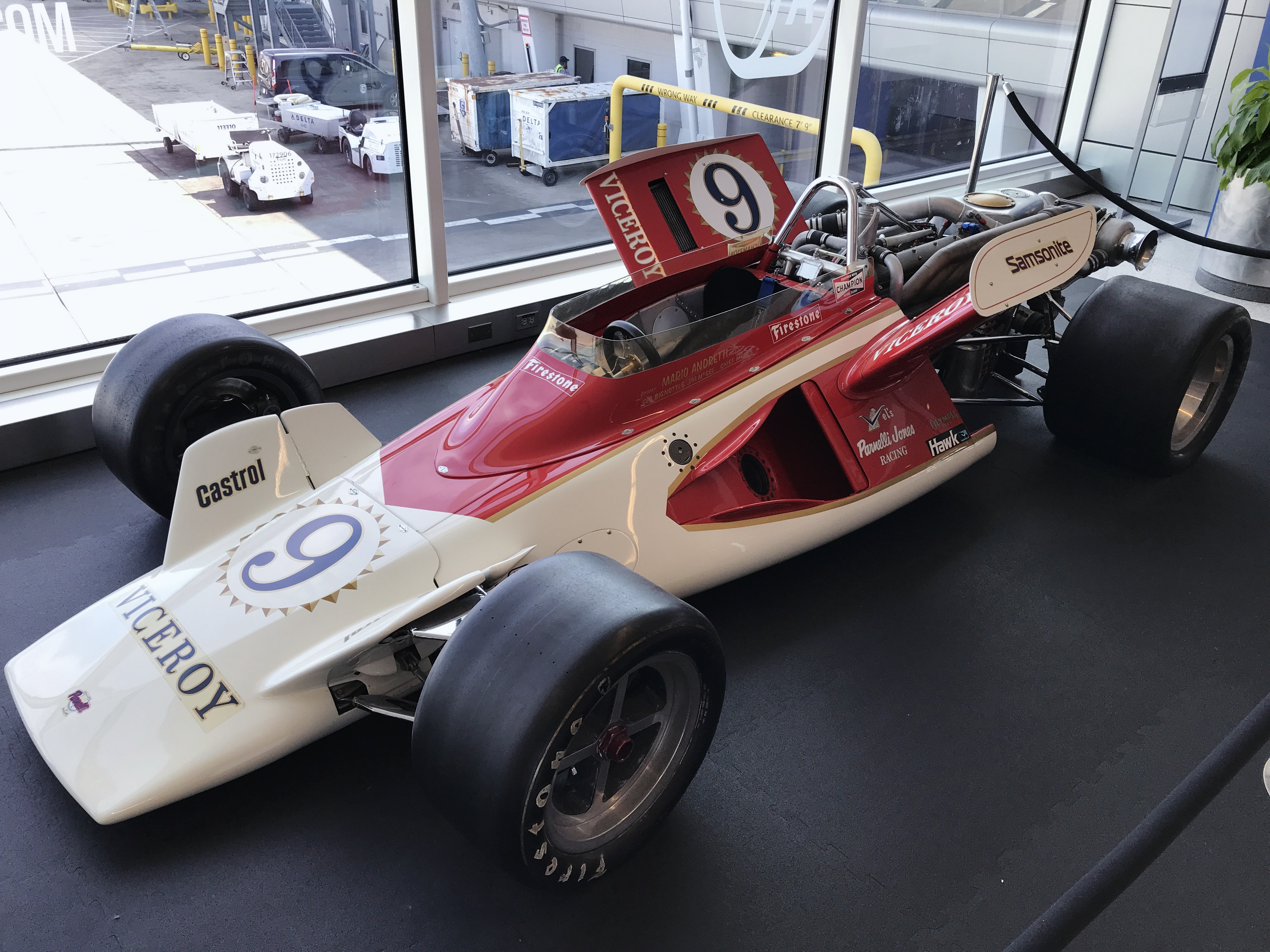
- The Parnelli VPJ1 with dihedral wings installed
- Category: USAC IndyCar
- Constructor: Vel's Parnelli Jones Racing
- Designer(s): Maurice Phillippe
- Successor: Parnelli VPJ2

Technical specifications
- Chassis: Aluminum Monocoque
- Suspension: Inboard springs and Fox shocks front and rear, operated by top rocker arm with front and lower rear A arms of streamline tubing
- Engine: Offenhauser 158 cu in (2,589.2 cc) I-4 Mid-engined, longitudinally mounted
- Transmission: Hewland L.G. Mk.II 4-speed manual
- Weight: 1,550 lb (703.1 kg)
- Fuel: Methanol
- Tyres: Firestone Speedway Specials - Rear 27.0x14.5-15 - Front 25.5x10.0-15

Competition history
- Notable drivers: Al Unser; Mario Andretti; Joe Leonard

The Parnelli VPJ1 is an open-wheel race car, designed by British designer and engineer Maurice Phillippe for Vel's Parnelli Jones Racing, to compete in U.S.A.C. Championship Car for 1972. It was driven by Mario Andretti, Al Unser, and Joe Leonard. It was powered by an Offenhauser four-cylinder turbo engine, reputed to develop between 1,200–1,300 hp (890–970 kW), depending on turbo boost pressure levels. In its original configuration, the car was designed with dihedral wings mounted to either side of the cockpit and sticking up at 45-degree angles. However, the unusual aerodynamic design proved no performance benefits, and by the Indianapolis 500 in May, the design had been revised to have the wings removed. Following the redesign, the car saw success, most notably with Joe Leonard who won three races and won the 1972 USAC Championship. Al Unser and Mario Andretti saw minor achievements, with Unser scoring podiums at Indianapolis and Pocono, and Andretti at Phoenix.
