= Lola T270 =

Open-wheel racing car chassis

- Category: USAC IndyCar
- Constructor: Lola
- Predecessor: Lola T150
- Successor: Lola T500

Technical specifications
- Chassis: Steel subframe with fully-stressed engine
- Suspension (front): Lower wishbones, top rockers actuating in-board coil springs over dampers, anti-roll bar
- Suspension (rear): Twin lower links, single top links, twin trailing arms, coil springs over dampers, anti-roll bar
- Axle track: 61.5 in (1,562.1 mm) (front); 61.5 in (1,562.1 mm) (rear)
- Wheelbase: 103.5 in (2,628.9 mm)
- Engine: Ford/Foyt/Offenhauser 2,650 cc (161.7 cu in) V8 80°/I4 Mid-engined, longitudinally mounted
- Transmission: Hewland L.G.600 4-speed manual
- Fuel: Methanol, supplied by Mobil
- Tyres: Goodyear Eagle Speedway Specials - Rear 27.0x14.0-15 - Front 25.5x10.0-15

Competition history

The Lola T270 is an open-wheel racing car chassis, designed, developed and built by Lola Cars, that competed in the CART open-wheel racing series, for competition in the 1972 and 1973 USAC Championship Car seasons. It didn't win any races, with its best race result being a 2nd-place finish; being driven by Wally Dallenbach at Michigan in 1972. Its best Indianapolis 500 result was a 4th-place finish; being driven by Sam Sessions, in the 1972 race. It was powered by three different engines; including Ford and Foyt-badged Ford V8 turbocharged engines, or an Offenhauser four-cylinder turbo engine.
