= Mel Kenyon =

American racing driver

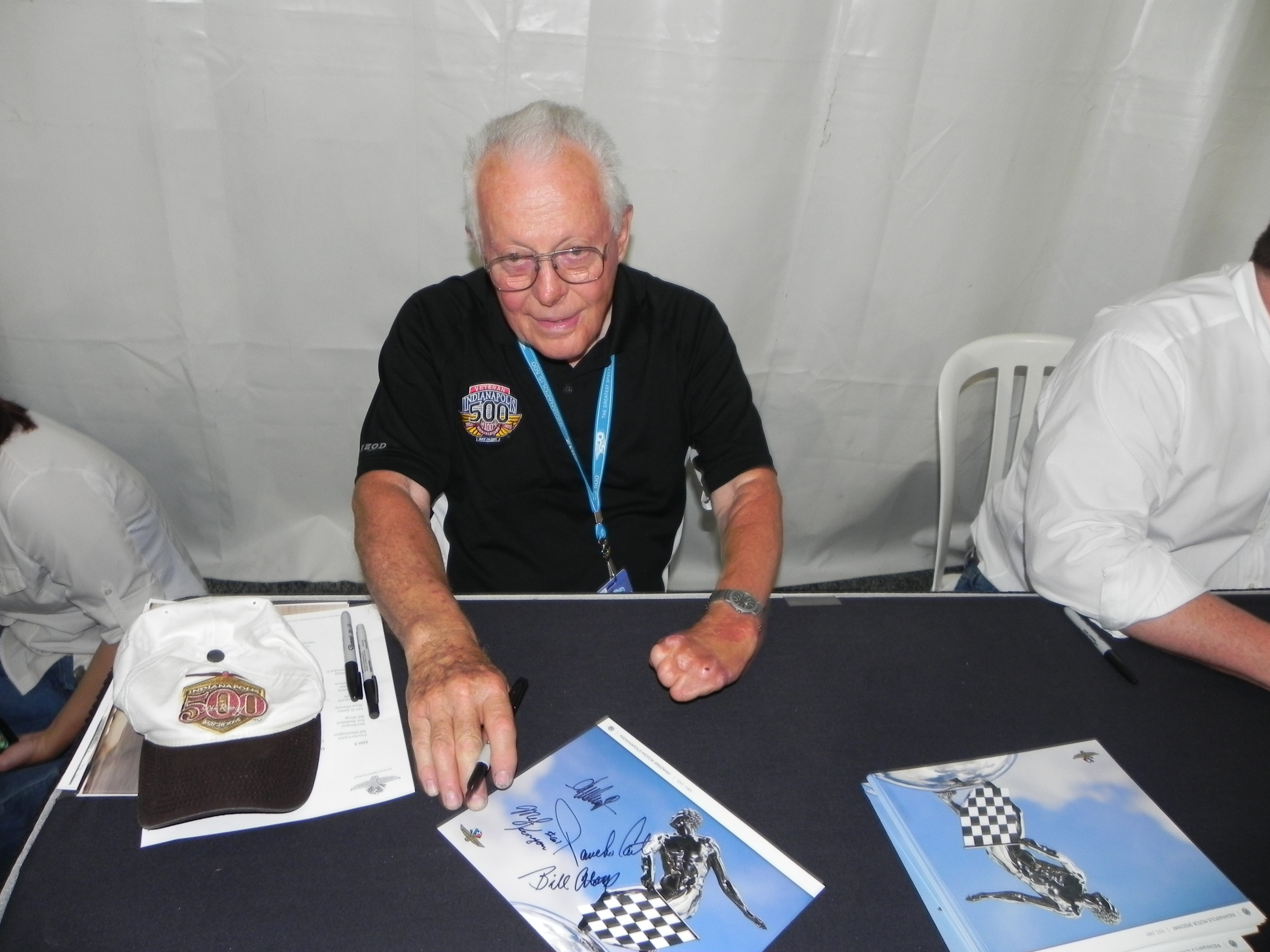
- Kenyon at the 2012 Indianapolis 500 Legends Day
- Born: 15 April 1933 (age 93); DeKalb, Illinois, United States
- Other names: "King of the Midgets", "Miraculous Mel", and "Champion of Midget Auto Racing"
- Occupation: Midget Car Driver

Mel Kenyon (born April 15, 1933, in DeKalb, Illinois) is a former midget car driver. He is known as the "King of the Midgets", "Miraculous Mel" and "Champion of Midget Auto Racing." The Motorsports Hall of Fame of America says "Many consider him to be midget car racing's greatest driver ever."

== Racing career ==
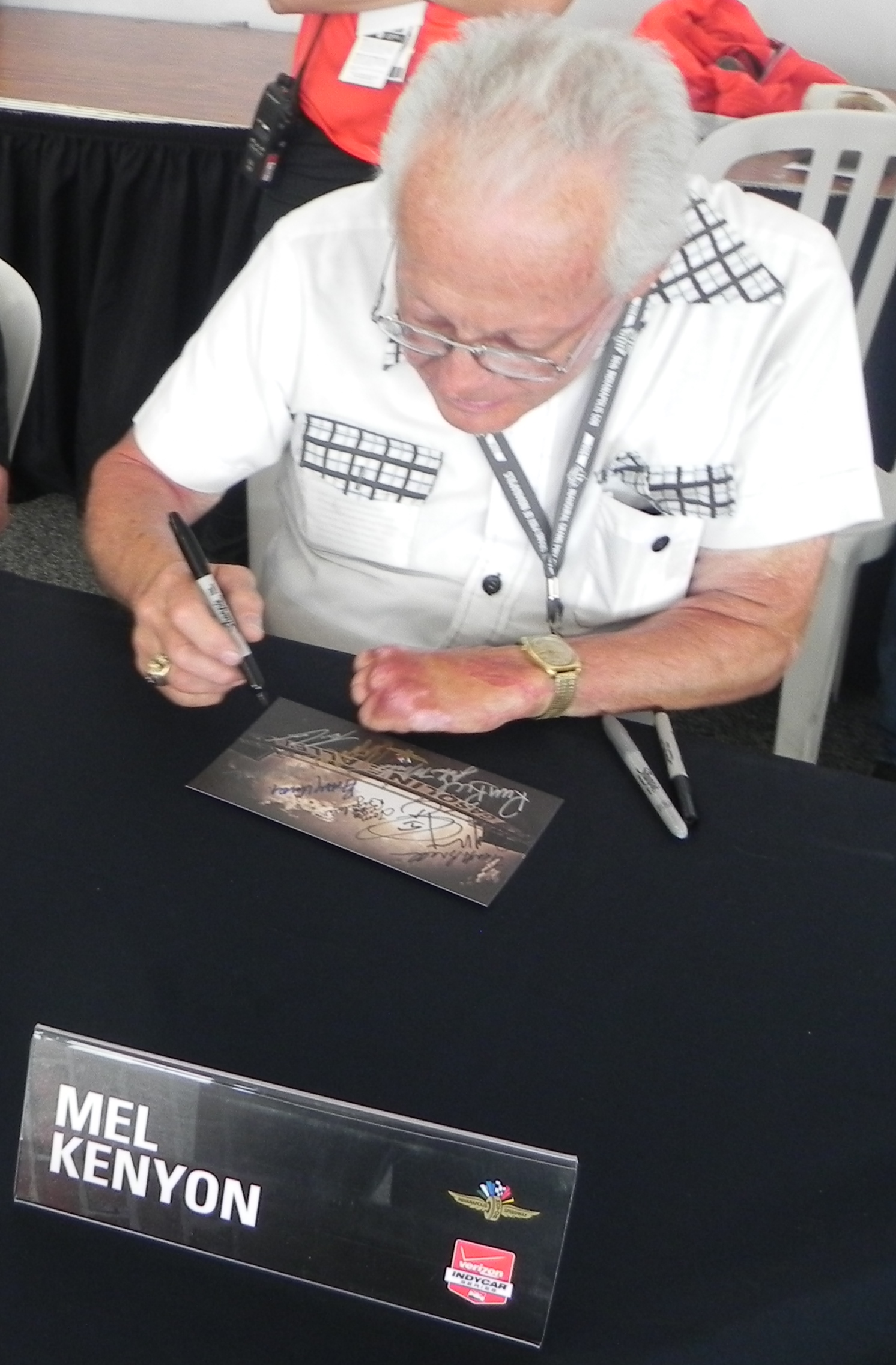
Kenyon at the 2014 Indianapolis 500.

Kenyon attended his first auto race in 1946. He began his racing career in 1954 racing a 1937 Chevy Coupe. He totaled the car when a tire blew out. He raced modified stocks in 1955. In 1958, Kenyon began his career in the midgets.

Kenyon's first championship was in NASCAR's Florida midget series in 1962, but he changed to USAC in the middle of the season and finished fifth in the USAC National Midget championship points.

Kenyon won the 1963 Turkey Night Grand Prix. He finished second in the 1963 USAC championship points, and won his first USAC National Midget championship in 1964.

Kenyon failed to qualify for his first Indianapolis 500 in 1965. Kenyon's tenth career race in a USAC IndyCar was at Langhorne Speedway in Langhorne, Pennsylvania on June 20, 1965. Mel's engine blew up sending oil all over the car, his firesuit and the track. He lost control of the car, hit the wall and was knocked unconscious. Jim Hurtubise and Ralph Liguori slid in the oily track and ran straight into Mel's fuel tank. Joe Leonard, also involved in the crash, rescued Kenyon from the burning car. Because of severe burns, Kenyon went through multiple operations at the San Antonio Burn Center, and he lost nearly all of his fingers on his left hand. Mel, his brother Don and their father Everett designed a special glove with a rubber grommet sewn into the palm. The glove fit on Mel's hand and hooked into the steering wheel. The trio formed a racing team called 3-K Racing, with Don as the crew chief.

Kenyon returned to racing in 1966. He had twelve first or second-place finishes, and finished second in the National Midget points. He qualified for his first Indianapolis 500 just eleven months after his fiery crash, and finished fifth.

Kenyon won 17 of 49 features to claim the National midget title in 1967.

Kenyon finished third in the 1968 Indianapolis 500 in a car sponsored by his hometown of Lebanon, Indiana. He did most of the work on the engine despite his hand. He routinely tore down and reassembled the Offenhauser engine by himself. He won the 1968 National Midget crown.

Kenyon took fourth in the 1969 Indianapolis 500.

Kenyon nearly won his first Champ car event at Michigan International Speedway on July 16, 1972. Kenyon was leading as he approached the white flag, but his Foyt powered Eagle ran out of fuel. Mel coasted around the track and finished third.

Kenyon finished fourth in his last of eight Indianapolis 500s in 1973. He had four top-five finishes in the classic race.

Kenyon won his second Turkey Night Grand Prix in 1975. The event was held on the 605 Speedway, the first time the event was held on pavement.

Kenyon had over 100 victories in midget cars in 1984 when he was inducted in the National Midget Auto Racing Hall of Fame. He won the 1985 National Midget championship a year after his induction.

Kenyon won the Indianapolis Speedrome midget car track title in 1993.

Kenyon stopped racing on the national tour in 1995 after his wife Marieanne became virtually comatose after suffering a major head injury in a bicycle accident. Kenyon won the Midwest-based NAMARS championships in 1995, 1996, and 1997 while in his sixties.

Kenyon continued racing after his 70th birthday in 2003. His son, Brice Kenyon, won the 2004 Indianapolis Speedrome midget track championship at the 1/5 mile track. Kenyon competed in the full schedule at the Indianapolis Speedrome in 2005 against his son.

=== Career summary ===
Kenyon has seven USAC National Midget championships, eight runners-up in the season points standings, and top-five point finishes in 21 of 27 seasons between 1966 and 1988.

At his Motorsports Hall of Fame induction in 2003, Kenyon had 111 feature wins, 131 seconds, 107 thirds, 81 fourths, and 69 fifths, for a total of 419 top-five finishes. He also had 688 top-ten finishes. The totals are for USAC National midget races only, and don't include races in the NAMARS national races, regional or local races. He had counted 380 midget total feature wins, including wins in Australia and New Zealand, three NAMARS midget championships, and over 380 midget feature wins in all.

Kenyon competed in 65 USAC Championship (IndyCar) and eight Indianapolis 500 races.

== Career awards ==
- Kenyon was inducted in the International Motorsports Hall of Fame in 2003.
- Kenyon was inducted in the Motorsports Hall of Fame of America in 2003.
- Kenyon was inducted in the National Midget Auto Racing Hall of Fame.
- Indianapolis Raceway Park hosts the annual "Mel Kenyon Classic" midget car race in his honor, and Kenyon has raced in the televised feature event in the 2000s.

== Indianapolis 500 results ==
Year	Car	Start	Qual	Rank	Finish	Laps	Led	Status
1966	94	17	158.555	32	5	198	0	Running
1967	15	14	163.778	17	16	177	0	Crash T3
1968	15	17	165.191	14	3	200	0	Running
1969	9	24	165.426	24	4	200	0	Running
1970	23	22	165.906	27	16	160	0	Crash T3
1971	23	30	170.205	22	32	10	0	Crash T3
1972	23	12	181.388	21	18	126	0	Fuel Injection
1973	19	19	190.224	25	4	131	0	Running
Totals						1237	0	

Starts	8
Poles	0
Front Row	0
Wins	0
Top 5	4
Top 10	4
Retired	4
