= Peter Revson =

American racing driver (1939–1974)

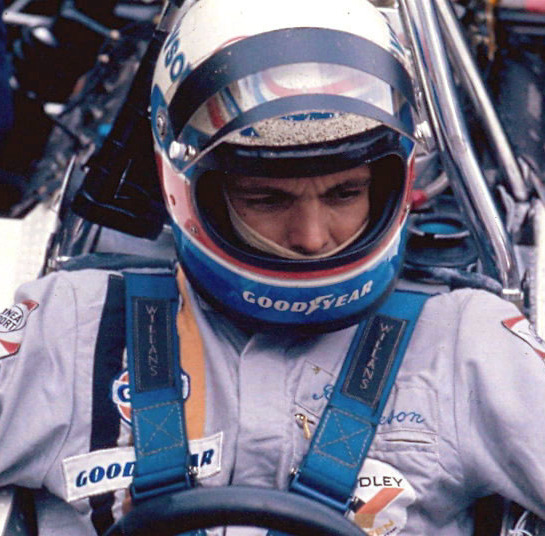
- Revson at the 1973 German Grand Prix
- Born: Peter Jeffrey Revlon Revson; February 27, 1939; New York City, U.S.
- Died: March 22, 1974 (aged 35); Kyalami, Gauteng, South Africa
- Cause of death: Injuries sustained at the 1974 South African Grand Prix
- Partners: Marjorie Wallace (1973–1974; his death)
- Relatives: Charles Revson (uncle)

Formula One World Championship career
- Nationality: (United States) American
- Active years: 1964, 1971–1974
- Team(s): Privateer Lotus, Parnell, Tyrrell, McLaren, Shadow
- Entries: 32 (30 starts)
- Championships: 0
- Wins: 2
- Podiums: 8
- Career points: 61
- Pole positions: 1
- Fastest laps: 0
- First entry: 1964 Monaco Grand Prix
- First win: 1973 British Grand Prix
- Last win: 1973 Canadian Grand Prix
- Last entry: 1974 Brazilian Grand Prix

Champ Car career
- 17 races run over 8 years
- Best finish: 12th (1971)
- First race: 1966 Bobby Ball Memorial (Phoenix)
- Last race: 1973 California 500 (Ontario)
- First win: 1969 Indy 200 Heat 2 (IRP)
Wins	Podiums	Poles
1	3	3

Peter Jeffrey Revlon Revson (February 27, 1939 – March 22, 1974) was an American racing driver, who competed in Formula One between 1964 and 1974. (Note: The exact years Revson competed in Formula One: 1964, 1971–1974.) Revson won two Formula One Grands Prix across five seasons.

Born and raised in New York, Revson was the nephew of Charles Revson and heir to cosmetics company Revlon. Revson won the Canadian-American Challenge Cup in 1971, and finished fifth overall in the World Drivers' Championship in 1972 and 1973 with McLaren. He was also runner-up to Al Unser in the 1971 Indianapolis 500.

Revson, along with Dan Gurney, was one of two drivers to win races in Formula One, IndyCar, Can-Am, and Trans-Am. His champagne-spraying celebrations in victory lane earned him the nickname "Champagne Peter". Revson was inducted into the Motorsports Hall of Fame of America in 1996.

Revson was killed on March 22, 1974, in a crash during a training session ahead of the 1974 South African Grand Prix at Kyalami.

== Background ==
Revson was born in New York City, the son of Martin Revson and Julie (née Phelps) Hall. Martin had been a founding partner (along with his brother Charles Revson) of Revlon cosmetics, but had parted ways in 1958 and become chairman of Del Laboratories in 1963. His mother had been a nightclub singer at the time Martin met her.

Revson's full name was Peter Jeffrey Revlon Revson, his middle name a nod to his family's business. As a young man, newspaper articles commonly referred to him as Peter Revlon Revson.

Revson chose a career centered on competitive and high-risk activities, including racing in the USAC Championship Car series and Formula One, piloting a 32-foot (9.8 m) ChrisCraft boat, and maintaining relationships with several prominent figures in social circles. At the time of his death, he was engaged to Marjorie Wallace, the 1973 Miss World, who had recently relinquished the title. (Note: Wallace was stripped of her crown 15 days before Revson's death, due to her then-active affair with singer Tom Jones, breaking the rules of Miss World)

== Early life and racing career ==
Revson spent his childhood in White Plains, New York, attending prep schools. He had two sisters, Jennifer and Julie Ann, as well as a younger brother Doug, who was killed in a race in Denmark in 1967. Revson never finished his college education after attending Columbia University, Cornell University, and the University of Hawaiʻi. In 1960, while attending the University of Hawaiʻi, he bought a Morgan and entered into sports car racing. In his first race, Revson placed second, then won his next race. His family withdrew their financial aid when he turned his attention to competitive racing full time, relying instead on his savings and education funds. Teaming with Cornell classmate Timmy Mayer and friend Bill Smith, and managed by Teddy Mayer under the Rev-Em Racing banner, Revson competed in Formula Junior in 1962.

In 1963, after limited successes and with Formula One (F1) aspirations, Revson took the remaining money he had, around US$12,000 (equivalent to $126,200 in 2025), and moved to the United Kingdom. There he was able to buy a Formula Junior Cooper T56 and a Ford Thames van. He then began barnstorming around mainland Europe competing and winning against the likes of future F1 stars Denny Hulme and Jochen Rindt. Revson caught the attention of Reg Parnell, from whom Revson rented workshop space, and was offered a spot on Parnell's planned F1 team for the 1964 season. Revson made his F1 debut at a 1963 exhibition race at the Gold Cup in Oulton Park, England, finishing ninth. In 1964, Revson teamed with fellow Reg Parnell Racing drivers Chris Amon and Mike Hailwood, referred to as the Ditton Road Flyers, who received more attention due to their antics and wild parties than their performances on the track. Revson also raced that year, closely associated with Reg Parnell Racing, under his own Revson Racing banner. Both teams were uncompetitive due to a number of factors, including the sudden death of Reg Parnell, financial troubles, and the poor performance of the Lotus 24 car. Revson raced in four of the ten F1 World Championship races that season, completing only two; his best finish was 13th at the 1964 Italian Grand Prix. He also competed in five non-championship races that season, where his best finish was a fourth place at the 1964 Solitude Grand Prix, in West Germany.

Revson accepted an offer to race in the United States in 1965. Focusing mainly on sports car racing, including the Can-Am and Trans-Am Series, he was able to build his reputation as a capable driver. He also competed in American open-wheel car racing, including the top level USAC Championship Car series. In that series, he qualified for the 33rd and final starting position at the 1969 Indianapolis 500; despite completing only 197 of the 200 laps, he finished in fifth place in an underpowered Brabham BT25. He returned to the Indianapolis Raceway Park track later in the 1969 USAC Championship Car season, where he finished third in heat one of the Indianapolis 200, followed by his first Champ Car win in the second heat. His 1969 success at Indianapolis Raceway Park earned him an invitation to race for the McLaren team at the 1970 Indianapolis 500, after his friend Chris Amon decided to not participate; Revson qualified 16th, but retired from the race due to mechanical reasons after 87 laps. That same year, while teamed in a Porsche 908/02 with Steve McQueen, the duo finished second overall in the 12 hours of Sebring, and first overall in the 3-liter class, just a few seconds behind the 5-liter Ferrari 512 driven by a trio led by Mario Andretti. McQueen received credit for driving with a broken foot, which also meant that Revson drove the bulk of the race. Revson also finished the 1970 Can-Am season in eighth, driving a Lola T220 for Carl Haas Racing.

The 1971 racing season was a major breakthrough in Revson's career. Driving at the 1971 Indianapolis 500 for McLaren Racing, he qualified in the pole position in a McLaren M16, and finished the race in second place. As a member of the McLaren Racing team in the 1971 Can-Am season, Revson drove his McLaren M8F to five wins and three other podium finishes in the ten-race season, winning the championship. His success earned him an invitation to race in Formula One, at the season ending 1971 United States Grand Prix, for the Tyrrell Racing team; he started 19th, but retired after one lap due to mechanical issues with his Tyrrell 003-Ford Cosworth DFV.

Revson's success in 1971 earned him an offer from the McLaren Formula One team for 1972, headed by his long-time friend Teddy Mayer. Revson entered the 1972 season as a driver for McLaren's Indy Car, Can-Am, and Formula One teams.

Revson's champagne-spraying celebrations in victory lane earned him the nickname "Champagne Peter".

== Formula One career ==
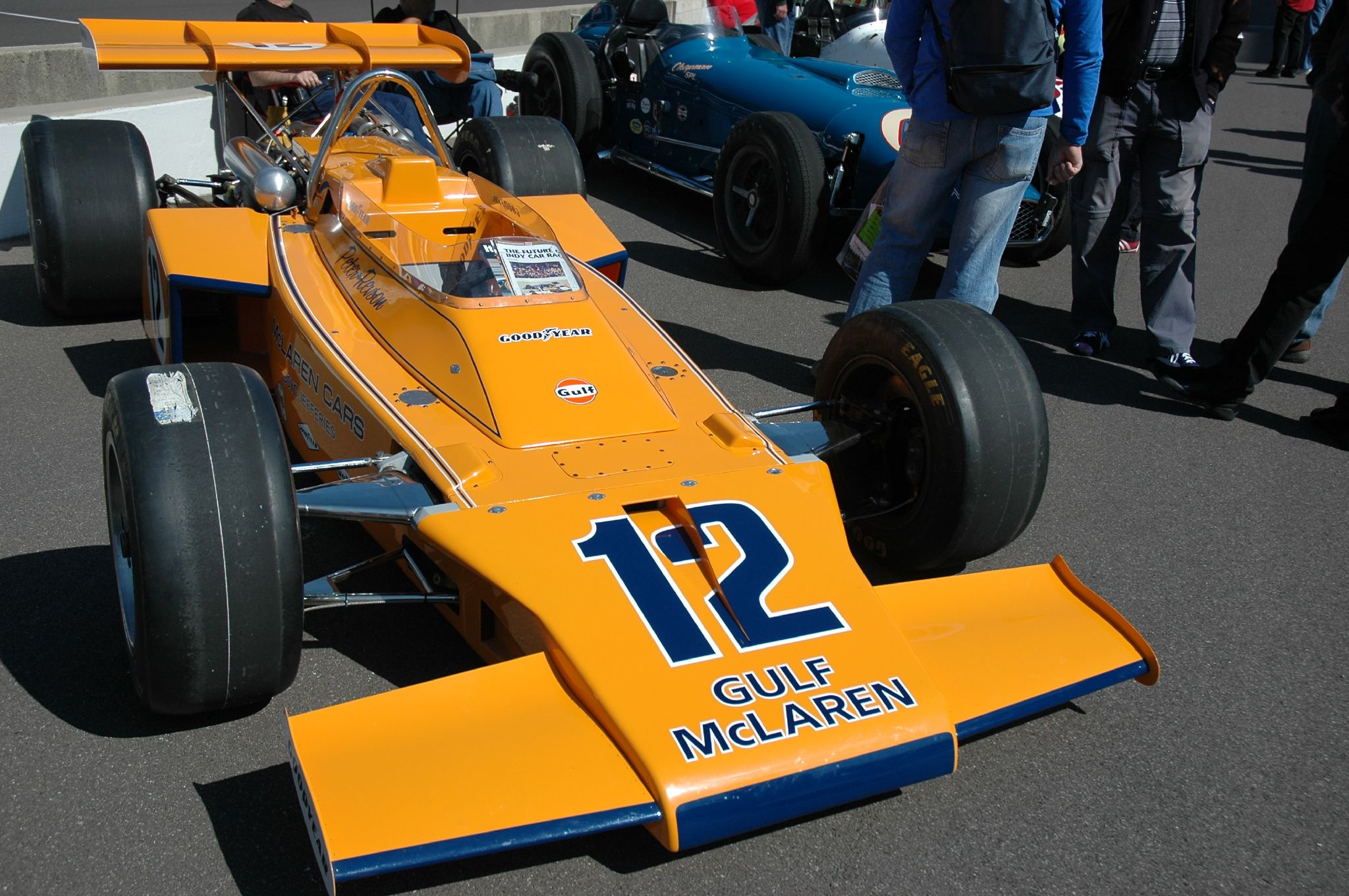
The McLaren Revson drove in the 1972 Indianapolis 500.

During the 1972 F1 season, Revson finished fifth in the Driver's World Championship, helping McLaren finish third in the World Constructors' Champion Championship with its McLaren M19A / M19C. Running nine out of the 12 races, Revson finished on the podium four times with three third-place finishes and a season-best second-place finish at the 1972 Canadian Grand Prix.

As part of his contract with McLaren, Revson was required to drive a McLaren Indy team entry in the Indy Car Triple Crown of 500 mile races for the 1972 USAC Championship Car season. At the 1972 Indianapolis 500, he started from tenth on the grid, but retired due to mechanical issues after 23 laps. He also retired due to mechanical issues, after seven laps, at the Pocono 500 and finished 23rd at the California 500.

During the 1973 F1 season, Revson won two races in his McLaren M23, the 1973 British Grand Prix and the 1973 Canadian Grand Prix. He added two other podium finishes, with a third place and a second-place finish, helping McLaren finish third in the World Constructors' Champion Championship. Despite Revson's successes, Teddy Mayer was not satisfied and McLaren opted to sign the 1972 champion and 1973 runner-up Emerson Fittipaldi to replace Revson on the team for the 1974 season.

Revson again drove a McLaren Indy team entry in the Indy Car Triple Crown for the 1973 USAC Championship Car season. At the 1973 Indianapolis 500, he qualified to start from second on the grid, but retired after brushing the wall on the third lap. He qualified in the pole position for both the 1973 Pocono 500 and the 1973 California 500, finishing 21st and 23rd, respectively.

For the 1974 F1 season, Revson signed with the one-year-old Shadow Racing Cars F1 team. Driving the team's new Shadow DN3, Revson retired from the first race after an accident in the second lap, and retired from the second race due to overheating of his Ford Cosworth DFV engine after ten laps.

== Death ==
Revson was killed during a test session on 22 March 1974, before the 1974 South African Grand Prix in Kyalami. His Shadow DN3 suffered a front suspension failure and crashed heavily into the Armco barrier on the outside of "Barbecue Bend". The car stood on its nose, wrapped itself around the barrier and caught fire, and although safety workers and other drivers managed to pull Revson from the wreckage, he was already dead.

Tony Southgate, designer of the DN3, in a 2012 interview with Motor Sport, said:

Revvie was a fabulous easy-going guy, fitted in well, and a very good driver. But tragically he wasn't with us for long. He qualified on row 2 for Argentina and row 3 for Brazil. Then he and I, our chief mechanic Pete Kerr and two other mechanics went down to Kyalami for testing before the South African GP. Revvie was going very well, very happy with the car, and then he didn't come around. We rushed out to the back of the circuit and found the car buried under the Armco on the outside of a quick corner. Peter was already in the ambulance and gone. I phoned the hospital, and they told me I had to go to the morgue and identify him. When the news got out all hell let loose, journalists banging on my hotel door, then the Revson family lawyer arrived and took over. We were using titanium quite a lot on the DN3, which was quite a new material then. Titanium is finicky, it has to be machined smooth and the surface polished, and a ball joint which had some coarse machining on it had failed. There was only one layer of Armco and the car, instead of being deflected or stopped, had gone right under as far as the cockpit. I felt personally responsible. It was a very difficult time. The glamour of Formula 1 had gone, replaced by a sort of loneliness. You just had to work on. Of course I replaced all the titanium components with steel before the next race.

He was the second Revson to lose his life racing; his brother Douglas was killed in a crash in Denmark in 1967. Peter and Douglas Revson are interred together in a crypt in the community mausoleum at Ferncliff Cemetery in Hartsdale, New York. Revson's autobiography, Speed with Style, co-written with Leon Mandel, was published posthumously by Doubleday & Company in 1974.

Revson was replaced by Tom Pryce, who died three years later at the same Grand Prix.

== Awards ==
Revson was inducted into the Motorsports Hall of Fame of America in 1996 in the sports car category.

== Racing record ==
=== Complete Formula One World Championship results ===
(key) (Races in bold indicate pole position)

Year	Entrant	Chassis	Engine	1	2	3	4	5	6	7	8	9	10	11	12	13	14	15	WDC	Pts
1964	Revson Racing	Lotus 24	BRM V8	MON; DNQ	NED				GER; 14	AUT	ITA; 13	USA	MEX						NC	0
1964	Reg Parnell Racing	Lotus 24	BRM V8			BEL; DSQ		GBR; Ret											NC	0
1964	Reg Parnell Racing	Lotus 25	BRM V8				FRA; DNS												NC	0
1971	Elf Team Tyrrell	Tyrrell 001	Cosworth V8	RSA	ESP	MON	NED	FRA	GBR	GER	AUT	ITA	CAN	USA; Ret					NC	0
1972	Team Yardley McLaren	McLaren M19A	Cosworth V8	ARG; Ret	RSA; 3	ESP; 5	MON	BEL; 7	FRA	GBR; 3	GER								5th	23
1972	Team Yardley McLaren	McLaren M19C	Cosworth V8									AUT; 3	ITA; 4	**CAN**; 2	USA; 18				5th	23
1973	Team Yardley McLaren	McLaren M19C	Cosworth V8	ARG; 8	BRA; Ret	RSA; 2													5th	38
1973	Team Yardley McLaren	McLaren M23	Cosworth V8				ESP; 4	BEL; Ret	MON; 5	SWE; 7	FRA	GBR; 1	NED; 4	GER; 9	AUT; Ret	ITA; 3	CAN; 1	USA; 5	5th	38
1974	UOP Shadow Racing Team	Shadow DN3	Cosworth V8	ARG; Ret	BRA; Ret	RSA	ESP	BEL	MON	SWE	NED	FRA	GBR	GER	AUT	ITA	CAN	USA	NC	0

=== Non-championship Formula One results ===
(key) (Races in bold indicate pole position) (Races in italics indicate fastest lap)

Year	Entrant	Chassis	Engine	1	2	3	4	5	6	7	8	9	10	11	12	13	14
1963	Reg Parnell	Lotus 24	BRM V8	LOM	GLV	PAU	IMO	SYR	AIN	INT	ROM	SOL	KAN	MED	AUT	OUL; 9	RAN
1964	Revson Racing	Lotus 24	BRM V8	DMT; Ret	NWT; 8	SYR; Ret	AIN; DNA	INT; 9	SOL; 4	MED; 6	RAN						
1971	Milestone Racing Team	Surtees TS8	Chevrolet V8	ARG	ROC	QUE; Ret	SPR	INT	RIN	OUL	VIC						
1972	Yardley Team McLaren	McLaren M19A	Ford Cosworth DFV 3.0 V8	ROC; 8	BRA												
1972	Yardley Team McLaren	McLaren M19B	Ford Cosworth DFV 3.0 V8			INT; 5	OUL	REP	VIC								
1973	Yardley Team McLaren	McLaren M23	Ford Cosworth DFV 3.0 V8	ROC	INT; 4												
1974	UOP Shadow Racing Team	Shadow DN3	Cosworth V8	PRE	ROC; 6	INT											

=== Complete USAC Championship Car results ===
Year	1	2	3	4	5	6	7	8	9	10	11	12	13	14	15	16	17	18	19	20	21	22	23	24	25	26	27	28	Pos	Points	Ref
1966	PHX	TRE	INDY	MIL	LAN	ATL	PIP	IRP	LAN	SPR	MIL	DUQ	ISF	TRE	SAC	PHX; 16													-	0	
1967	PHX; 13	TRE; DNQ	INDY; DNP	MIL	LAN	PIP	MOS	MOS	IRP	LAN	MTR	MTR	SPR	MIL	DUQ	ISF	TRE	SAC	HAN	PHX	RIV								-	0	
1968	HAN	LVG	PHX	TRE	INDY	MIL	MOS	MOS	LAN	PIP	CDR	NAZ	IRP	IRP	LAN	LAN	MTR	MTR	SPR	MIL	DUQ	ISF	TRE	SAC	MCH	HAN	PHX	RIV; 10	-	0	
1969	PHX	HAN	INDY; 5	MIL	LAN	PIP	CDR	NAZ	TRE	IRP; 3	IRP; 1	MIL	SPR	DOV	DUQ	ISF	BRN	BRN	TRE	SAC	KEN	KEN	PHX	RIV; DNP					-	0	
1970	PHX	SON	TRE	INDY; 22	MIL	LAN	CDR	MCH	IRP	SPR	MIL	ONT; 5	DUQ	ISF	SED	TRE	SAC	PHX											-	0	
1971	RAF	RAF	PHX	TRE	INDY; 2	MIL	POC; 21	MCH	MIL	ONT; 7	TRE	PHX																	12th	1,100	
1972	PHX	TRE	INDY; 31	MIL	MCH	POC; 31	MIL	ONT; 23	TRE	PHX																			-	0	
1973	TWS	TRE	TRE	INDY; 31	MIL	POC; 21	MCH	MIL	ONT	ONT	ONT; 23	MCH	MCH	TRE	TWS	PHX													-	0	

=== Indianapolis 500 results ===
Year	Chassis	Engine	Start	Finish
1969	Brabham	Repco	33rd	5th
1970	McLaren	Offy	16th	22nd
1971	McLaren	Offy	1st	**2nd**
1972	McLaren	Offy	2nd	31st
1973	McLaren	Offy	10th	31st

=== Complete Canadian-American Challenge Cup results ===
(key) (Races in bold indicate pole position) (Races in italics indicate fastest lap)

Year	Team	Car	Engine	1	2	3	4	5	6	7	8	9	10	11	Pos	Points
1966	Drummond Racing	McLaren M1B	Ford	MTR	BRI	MOS	LAG	RIV; 6	LVG; 4						10th	4
1967	Dana Chevrolet Racing	Lola T70 Mk.3	Chevrolet	ROA; Ret	BRI; Ret	MOS; 4	LAG; Ret	RIV; Ret	LVG; DSQ						9th	3
1968	Shelby American Racing	McLaren M6B	Ford	ROA; 4	BRI; Ret	EDM; Ret	LAG; 12	RIV; Ret	LVG; Ret						12th	3
1969	Agapiou Brothers Racing	Ford G7A	Ford	MOS; DNS	MTR; DNS	WGL	EDM								9th	30
1969	Robbins-Jeffries Racing	Lola T163	Chevrolet					MOH; 7	ROA; 4	BRI; Ret	MCH; Ret	LAG; Ret	RIV; 5	TWS; Ret	9th	30
1970	Carl Haas Racing	Lola T220	Chevrolet	MOS; Ret	MTR; Ret	WGL; 19	EDM; Ret	MOH; 2	ROA; Ret	ATL; Ret	**BRA**; 3	LAG; 3	RIV; Ret		8th	39
1971	Bruce McLaren Motor Racing	McLaren M8F	Chevrolet	MOS; 2	MTR; 3	ATL; 1	WGL; 1	MOH; 7	ROA; 1	**BRA**; 1	**EDM**; 12	**LAG**; 1	RIV; 2		1st	142
1972	Bruce McLaren Motor Racing	McLaren M20	Chevrolet	MOS; 3	ATL; Ret	**WGL**; 2	MOH; Ret	ROA; Ret	BRA; Ret	EDM; 6	LAG; 19	RIV; 2			6th	48

== See also ==
- List of select Jewish racing drivers

== Bibliography ==
- Revson, Peter; Mandel, Leon (1974). Speed with Style: The Autobiography of Peter Revson. Garden City, N.Y.: Doubleday. ISBN 978-0-385-06166-7.

Sporting positions
Preceded by Jackie Stewart	Monaco Formula Three; Race Winner; 1965	Succeeded by Jean-Pierre Beltoise
Preceded by Denny Hulme	Can-Am; Champion; 1971	Succeeded by George Follmer
Preceded by François Cevert	Formula One fatal accidents March 22, 1974	Succeeded by Helmut Koinigg
