= Jimmy Caruthers =

American racing driver (1945–1975)

Douglas James Caruthers (January 18, 1945 – October 26, 1975) was an American racecar driver from Anaheim, California. He raced midget cars, sprint cars, and Indy cars.

== Midget car career ==
Caruthers won the 1970 USAC National Midget Series championship. His championship was the closest in USAC midget history, as he beat Dave Strickland by 12.48 points. He finished second to his brother Danny Caruthers in 1971. Jimmy won 21 USAC midget car features between 1967 and 1975.

== Sprint car career ==
Caruthers competed in the ARDC while stationed on the East Coast during his tour of duty in the armed forces. He was transferred to Phoenix, and race in caged sprint cars on weekends. He almost won the championship, but was transferred overseas before the end of the season.

== Championship Indy car career ==
Caruthers drove in the USAC Championship Car series, racing in the 1970–1975 seasons with 43 starts, including the 1972–1975 Indianapolis 500. He finished in the top-ten 21 times. His best finish were second-place finishes at the 1974 California 500 at the Ontario Motor Speedway and 1974 Pocono 500. He drove in four Indianapolis 500s.

== Silver Crown car career ==
Caruthers won the 1975 USAC Silver Crown Series championship while suffering from cancer. He captured the title by finishing third at the Hoosier 100 six weeks before he died. He died of cancer in October 1975 before claiming his championship trophy.

USAC has annually awarded the "Jimmy Caruthers Award" in his honor since 1978. Initially given to the Rookie of the Year, it was rededicated to honor his spirit and determination, shown in winning the Silver Crown championship in the year of his death from cancer.

== Career Awards ==
- He was inducted in the National Midget Auto Racing Hall of Fame.

== Death ==
Caruthers died of cancer at the age of 30 only a month after competing in his final Championship Car race. He had received cobalt treatment (an early form of chemotherapy) in the winter of 1974-1975 in order to return to racing for the 1975 season.

== Famous family ==
His father Doug Caruthers and brother Danny Caruthers also died before accepting their USAC series championship at the end of the year awards banquet. The Caruthers family is synonymous with midget car racing.

=== Indy 500 results ===
Year	Chassis	Engine	Start	Finish
1971	Scorpion	Ford	Failed to Qualify	
1972	Scorpion	Foyt	31st	9th
1973	Eagle	Offy	9th	21st
1974	Eagle	Offy	12th	23rd
1975	Eagle	Offy	10th	14th
