= 1989 Pocono 500 =

(United States) 1989 Pocono 500
Race details
- 11th round of the 1989 CART PPG Indy Car World Series season
- Date: August 20, 1989
- Official name: 1989 Pocono 500
- Location: Long Pond, Pennsylvania
- Course: Permanent racing facility 2.5 mi / 4.023 km
- Distance: 200 laps 500 mi / 804.672 km
- Weather: Temperatures up to 77 °F (25 °C); wind speeds up to 14 miles per hour (23 km/h)

Pole position
- Driver: (Brazil) Emerson Fittipaldi (Patrick Racing)
- Time: 211.715 mph

Podium
- First: (United States) Danny Sullivan (Team Penske)
- Second: (United States) Rick Mears (Team Penske)
- Third: (United States) Michael Andretti (Newman/Haas Racing)

The 1989 Pocono 500, the 19th running of the event, was held at the Pocono Raceway in Long Pond, Pennsylvania, on Sunday, August 20, 1989. The race was won by Danny Sullivan, his second Pocono 500 victory. It was the last Indy car race at Pocono until 2013.

== Background ==
Following the 1988 race, Pocono received much criticism from drivers over the condition of the track, focusing on the bumpy racing surface and condition of its steel wall.

In 1987 and 1988, Quaker State was the title sponsor of the Pocono 500. For 1989, the oil company did not renew their two-year contract for the sponsorship of the race. Spokesman for Quaker State, Ben Faulkner, said the reason for the withdrawal was budgetary. "We had to bring costs under control. We dropped this and a drag race we sponsored for budgetary reasons."

However, Pocono track owner, Dr. Joseph Mattioli, claimed the withdrawal was due to the negative public complaints drivers had about the track conditions. "We had a good relationship, but they were in this to get good vibes. The bad vibes reflect on them."

Despite the withdrawal of the Quaker State oil company as sponsor, Pocono continued to call the race the Quaker State 500 in their promotional material, a reference to Pennsylvania's nickname as the Quaker State. The oil company was reportedly distressed about this and issued a statement on Thursday, August 17, reminding people it was not associated with the race anymore.

Unlike most tracks, Pocono's outside retaining wall was made of steel boiler-plate instead of concrete. And unlike concrete, the wall was not flush with the asphalt track surface, with small gaps on the bottom that would allow debris to fall from behind the wall. The wall was rusty, uneven, and wavy in spots. Entering the 1989 race, the track plugged the opening at the bottom of the wall in an attempt to reduce debris.

In the July 1989 NASCAR Winston Cup race, the boiler-plate wall broke in two separate crashes. On lap 80, the wall broke in turn two when Jimmy Horton crashed and the turn one wall broke on lap 128 when Greg Sacks and Lake Speed crashed.

Indy car drivers believed the steel walls were especially unsafe for their light and fragile cars. While long a supporter of Pocono and formerly a member of the track's board of directors, Mario Andretti said, "we're running under protest. I can assure you this is the last time that we will accept running here without the turns being paved and the turns and the main straightaway at least having concrete walls."

Mattioli insisted the track met safety standards set by CART and if a crash were to occur, drivers would view it as a self-fulfilling prophecy in context of their own superstitions. "Since we've opened, we've had about 60 500-mile races. I don't know of any really serious injuries. We think this is a pretty safe race track. The Italians have a feeling called the malocchio. It means bad eye. You put the spell on somebody. Sooner or later, something's going to happen. They're going to spook themselves into this."

The track was still favored by drivers, but all agreed that renovations were needed. Bobby Rahal said, "(Pocono) is actually my favorite oval. But they need some capital improvements. Nobody is asking anyone to go into bankruptcy."

Emerson Fittipaldi added, "It's a shame the surface is so bumpy. This is a really beautiful track. I enjoy racing here because it is a challenge to compromise the handling."

Fittipaldi had won the 1989 Indianapolis 500 and entered Pocono leading the CART point standings. Two weeks earlier, Michael Andretti won the Michigan 500.

== Practice and Time Trials ==
=== Practice - Thursday, August 17 ===
Emerson Fittipaldi was the fastest car in Thursday's opening practice session with a speed of 202.680 mph. Rick Mears was second at 201.144 mph, Mario Andretti third at 200.049 mph.

Michael Greenfield crashed in turn three. He suffered a bruised outer left foot and a fracture of a small bone in his foot. He was cleared to drive but the car was damaged too severely to be repaired and was withdrawn from the race.

=== Qualifying - Friday, August 18 ===
Friday morning's practice was led by Rick Mears at 208.681 mph, followed by Teo Fabi at 207.426, and Emerson Fittipaldi at 207.068 mph. No other driver was over 205 mph.

In time trials on Friday afternoon, Rick Mears set a very fast speed early at 211.119 mph, over five and a half miles per hour faster than the track record. For a brief period, Mears held the track record at every oval that CART ever raced at. Mears' time on the pole was ended when Emerson Fittipaldi beat him with a speed of 211.715 mph to take the pole position. Teo Fabi was third fastest with a speed of 207.249 mph. It was the same front row as in the Michigan 500, two weeks earlier.

=== Practice - Saturday, August 19 ===
Saturday rain washed out most of track activity. A 30-minute practice session was led by Rick Mears at 202.575 mph. Al Unser was second at 202.479 mph, followed by Bobby Rahal at 201.347 mph.

== Support races ==
The American Racing Series marked their fourth consecutive year racing at Pocono. Rain delayed the race from Saturday afternoon to Sunday morning. Tommy Byrne won the pole and pulled out to a large lead. The first caution came out on lap five when Mike Groff spun in turn one and collected Paul Tracy and Tom Christoff. P. J. Jones brought out a late caution when he spun in turn one. Byrne survived a three-lap run to the finish to claim his second ARS win at Pocono. Salt Walther made his return to racing for the first time since 1981. He finished 7th.

== Race ==
Approaching the green flag, row two starters Arie Luyendyk and Mario Andretti touched wheels in turn three, sending Luyendyk into the grass. The start was aborted. After getting his car back on track, Luyendyk regained the fourth starting position and the race began.

Emerson Fittipaldi led the field into turn one and pulled out a sizeable lead. The caution came out on lap 10 when Randy Lewis slowed to a stop entering turn three. Arie Luyendyk crashed at the exit of turn one on lap 60.

After 150 miles, Fittipaldi had lapped all but Mears, Sullivan, and Fabi. Except for four laps during pitstops, he led 63 of the first 67 laps. Fittipaldi led the field back after the restart for Luyendyk's caution. Suddenly as he went through turn two, Fittipaldi slowed off the pace and entered the pits. Suspension problems sidelined him for 22 laps before returning. He retired from the race after completing 167 laps.

"That was the best race I have ever been in," Fittipaldi said, "including Formula One. I have never been in a race where I was so dominant. I was like the little old lady, and the car just kept going faster and faster."

Rick Mears assumed the lead after Fittipaldi's problems and led 64 of the next 84 laps. Danny Sullivan, Teo Fabi, and Michael Andretti stayed close to the lead.

Michael Andretti took the lead under the final caution for debris on lap 150. He and held it for the next 37 laps. Andretti held a four-second lead over Sullivan as final green flag pit stops began with 15 laps remaining. Sullivan pitted first, a timed stop for fuel. Andretti's stop was longer, giving Sullivan a two-second lead after all stops were completed. Fading brakes on Teo Fabi's car forced him to miss his pit stall and go around another lap, knocking him out of contention to win. Mears passed Andretti for second with 10 laps remaining and set his sights on Sullivan. Mears cut the lead to within a second before fading late.

Sullivan won by 4.2 seconds to earn his second Pocono 500 win, his first since 1984. He won $98,618 and averaged 170.72 mph over the 500 miles, breaking the race record set by Johnny Rutherford in 1974.

== Box score ==
Finish	Grid	No	Name	Entrant	Chassis	Engine	Laps	Time/Status	Led	Points
1	7	1	(United States) Danny Sullivan	Penske Racing	Penske PC-18	Ilmor-Chevrolet	200	2:55:43.550	13	20
2	2	4	(United States) Rick Mears	Penske Racing	Penske PC-18	Ilmor-Chevrolet	200	+4.226	64	17
3	10	6	(United States) Michael Andretti	Newman/Haas Racing	Lola T89/00	Ilmor-Chevrolet	200	Running	44	14
4	3	8	(Italy) Teo Fabi	Porsche Motorsports	March 89P	Porsche	200	Running	16	12
5	5	5	(United States) Mario Andretti	Newman/Haas Racing	Lola T89/00	Ilmor-Chevrolet	199	+1 Lap	0	10
6	9	18	(United States) Bobby Rahal	Kraco Racing	Lola T89/00	Cosworth	198	+2 Laps	0	8
7	8	25	(United States) Al Unser	Penske Racing	Penske PC-18	Ilmor-Chevrolet	196	+4 Laps	0	6
8	14	3	(United States) Scott Pruett	Truesports	Lola T89/00	Judd	195	+5 Laps	0	5
9	11	2	(United States) Al Unser Jr.	Galles Racing	Lola T89/00	Ilmor-Chevrolet	194	+6 Laps	0	4
10	23	65	(Canada) John Jones	Protofab Racing	Lola T89/00	Cosworth	192	+8 Laps	0	3
11	19	69	(Mexico) Bernard Jourdain	Andale Racing	Lola T89/00	Cosworth	192	+8 Laps	0	2
12	16	29	(United States) Pancho Carter	Leader Card Racers	Lola T89/00	Cosworth	191	Engine	0	1
13	24	17	(United States) Johnny Rutherford	Stoops Racing	Lola T88/00	Cosworth	191	+9 Laps	0	0
14	13	22	(United States) Scott Brayton	Dick Simon Racing	Lola T89/00	Cosworth	191	+9 Laps	0	0
15	20	91	(United States) Gordon Johncock	Hemelgarn Racing	Lola T89/00	Judd	190	+10 Laps	0	0
16	22	21	(Colombia) Roberto Guerrero	Alex Morales Motorsports	March 89CE	Alfa Romeo	186	+14 Laps	0	0
17	18	9	(United States) John Andretti	Vince Granatelli Racing	Lola T88/00	Buick	174	+26 Laps	0	0
18	6	28	(United States) Randy Lewis	TeamKar International	Lola T89/00	Cosworth	174	+26 Laps	0	0
19	1	20	(Brazil) Emerson Fittipaldi	Patrick Racing	Penske PC-18	Ilmor-Chevrolet	167	Suspension	63	1
20	15	30	(Brazil) Raul Boesel	Doug Shierson Racing	Lola T89/00	Judd	124	Crash	0	0
21	12	14	(United States) A. J. Foyt	A. J. Foyt Enterprises	Lola T89/00	Cosworth	85	Electrical	0	0
22	21	11	(United States) Kevin Cogan	Machinists Union Racing	March 88C	Cosworth	74	Electrical	0	0
23	4	7	(Netherlands) Arie Luyendyk	Dick Simon Racing	Lola T89/00	Cosworth	60	Crash	0	0
24	17	10	(Republic of Ireland) Derek Daly	Raynor Motorsports	Lola T89/00	Judd	58	Handling	0	0
25	25	50	(Finland) Tero Palmroth	Euromotorsport	Lola T88/00	Cosworth	16	Ignition	0	0
26	26	27	(United States) Tony Bettenhausen Jr.	Dale Coyne Racing	Lola T88/00	Cosworth	13	Gearbox	0	0
27	27	19	(United States) Dale Coyne	Dale Coyne Racing	Lola T88/00	Cosworth	4	Gearbox	0	0

=== Failed to qualify ===
- (United States) Michael Greenfield (#16) – Withdrawn

=== Race statistics ===
Lap Leaders
Laps	Leader
1–27	Emerson Fittipaldi
28	Teo Fabi
29	Michael Andretti
30–57	Emerson Fittipaldi
58–59	Teo Fabi
60–67	Emerson Fittipaldi
68–83	Rick Mears
84–91	Teo Fabi
92–118	Rick Mears
119–123	Teo Fabi
124	Danny Sullivan
125–130	Michael Andretti
131–151	Rick Mears
152–188	Michael Andretti
189–200	Danny Sullivan

Cautions: 5 for 25 laps
Laps	Reason
1	Arie Luyendyk spin turn 3
11–16	Debris
61–67	Arie Luyendyk crash turn 1
125–130	Raul Boesel crash turn 3
151–156	Debris

== Broadcasting ==
For the third consecutive year, the Pocono 500 was broadcast by NBC in a two-hour tape-delayed format at 4 p.m. on Sunday afternoon. Charlie Jones and Tom Sneva were the play-by-play announcers. Sally Larvick and Gary Gerould served as pit reporters.

== Aftermath ==
When the 1990 CART schedule was released in early September, a race at Pocono was tentatively scheduled for August 19. As part of Pocono's four-year contract with CART beginning in 1987, the track had an escape clause that allowed them to cancel the 1990 event. An announcement was made in mid-September that Indy cars would not return to Pocono in 1990. Track owner Joseph Mattioli said the race lost too much money for the track.

"We lost our shirt on this race," Mattioli said. "We drew half of what we used to draw for the Schaefer 500 and half of what we draw for the NASCAR race, which was a sell-out."

While the decision to cancel the event going forward was made by the track, CART insisted they were prepared to drop the race regardless if improvements to the track were not made.

"He chose to exercise his option," CART spokesman Mel Poole said. "Technically speaking, he dropped us because of that option, but CART would not have returned because he failed to make the necessary improvements in the facility... We didn't want to lose Pocono. It's in a good market with Philadelphia and New York nearby, but we couldn't ask the drivers to race there under the current conditions."

Regardless of the Indy car event being canceled, Pocono replaced their boiler-plate wall with concrete at the end of 1989. The entire track was repaved prior to the 1996 season.

Many observers said the end of the Pocono 500 was due to a transformation in Indy car racing throughout the 1980s.

The Indy car event was viewed in comparison to the NASCAR event. Relative to NASCAR's growing success, critics said Indy car racing was unable to produce the weekly excitement that NASCAR could. Indy car drivers were not as personable to fans and did not carry the same star power as they were viewed as strangers who appeared suddenly from other countries. Pocono's customer base preferred oval racing, and it was believed CART's shift to being a road course-dominated series reduced interest in the series as a whole for fans.

Mattioli said in 1990, "I foolishly felt I could take the race and bring it back to the stature of the old Schaefer 500 (in the 1970s). Well, I made a mistake. We tried it for three years, and pumped money into it like it was going out of style. To run that race, with the expectation of losing money, was just ridiculous."

In September 1994, Mario Andretti spoke in support of Pocono's value to Indy Car racing. "We need Pocono. I'd love to see Pocono there. Pocono was, to me as a driver, the most challenging and best to drive of all the super speedways we ran... Fans on the east coast deserve that type of race. It has everything going for it. I wish they would have kept that up."

When the Indy Racing League was formed, the series expressed interest in racing at Pocono. In July 1995, Joseph Mattioli spoke highly of the IRL, but needed a race in late August, something the series was unable to provide. "As far as I'm concerned, the IRL is the best thing to happen to Indy cars in the last 20 years. With Tony George, that's the second best thing. His grandfather would be very happy with what he is doing. It's very good. We'd run them in a heartbeat. We just don't have the time."

Indy car races finally returned to Pocono in 2013 and the Pocono 500 ran again through 2019.
