= Vanscoy =

Vanscoy or van Scoy may refer:

== Places ==
- Rural Municipality of Vanscoy No. 345, Saskatchewan, Canada
  - Vanscoy, Saskatchewan, Canada; an urban municipality located within the rural municipality of Vanscoy
- Relief landing field Vanscoy of the RCAF Station Saskatoon, an offsite landing field for relief of the main field; in Vanscoy, Saskatchewan, Canada; formerly WWII British RAF training station RCAF Vanscoy

== People ==
- Grant Van Scoy, baseball player, member of the 2018 Illinois Fighting Illini baseball team
- Jerry VanScoy, football player, member of the 1960 Ohio State Buckeyes football team
- Thomas Van Scoy (1848–1901) U.S. minister and educator
- Tommy Van Scoy (1920–2005) U.S. diamond jeweler
- W.A. Van Scoy, an early film director, see List of American live-action shorts

== Other uses ==
- Van Scoy, a jewelry chain founded by Tommy Van Scoy, and sponsor of the Van Scoy Diamond Mine 500 race
- NASCAR Van Scoy Diamond Mine 500 (Van Scoy 500), NASCAR Cup-series race
- USAC Van Scoy Diamond Mine 500 (Van Scoy 500), former name of the IndyCar race ABC Supply 500

== See also ==
- Vans (disambiguation)
- Coy (disambiguation)
- Van (disambiguation)
