= Pocono 500 (IndyCar) =

IndyCar race at Pocono

IndyCar Series
- Venue: Pocono Raceway
- Location: Long Pond Road and Andretti Road, Long Pond, Pennsylvania, 18334, U.S. 41.0543° N, 75.5113° W
- First race: 1971
- Last race: 2019
- Distance: 500 mi (800 km)
- Laps: 200
- Previous names: Schaefer 500 (1971–1978); Music 500 at Pocono presented by Musicland/Sam Goody (1979); True Value 500 (1980); Van Scoy Diamond Mine 500 (1981); Domino's Pizza Pocono 500 (1982); Domino's Pizza 500 (1983–1986); Quaker State 500 (1987–1989); Pocono IndyCar 400 Fueled by Sunoco (2013); Pocono IndyCar 500 Fueled by Sunoco (2014); ABC Supply 500 (2015–2019)
- Most wins (driver): A. J. Foyt (4)
- Most wins (team): Team Penske (10)
- Most wins (manufacturer): Chassis: Dallara DW12 (7); Engine: Cosworth (11)

Circuit information
- Surface: Asphalt
- Length: 2.5 mi (4.0 km)
- Turns: 3
- Lap record: 40.2017 seconds 223.871 mph (360.285 km/h) (Juan Pablo Montoya, Dallara DW12, 2014, IndyCar Series)

The Pocono 500 was an IndyCar Series race held at Pocono Raceway in Long Pond, Pennsylvania, located in the Pocono Mountains. The first Indy car race at Pocono was held in 1971. It was the first major event held at the track, shortly after its completion. The race was sanctioned by USAC from 1971 to 1981, and then by CART from 1982 to 1989, and was known as the Pocono 500. The race was removed from the CART calendar following the 1989 running, due to poor track conditions, as well as poor revenue for the promoter.

After a 23-year hiatus, the event was revived by the IndyCar Series in 2013. Following management changes at the facility, and after comprehensive safety improvements were completed at the track, the race was scheduled for Independence Day weekend. For 2013, the race was scheduled for 400 miles, and was part of the IndyCar Triple Crown. For 2014, the race returned to its traditional 500-mile distance, and was scheduled in mid-to-late August.

A. J. Foyt is the most successful driver, with four wins. Rick Mears won the race three times during the CART years, and Will Power has won three times under IndyCar sanctioning.

The 2014 race, won by Juan Pablo Montoya, stands as the fastest 500-mile race in Indy car racing history. At an average speed of 202.402 mph (325.734 km/h), it was the first 500-mile race to be completed in under two and a half hours.

== Race history ==
=== USAC ===
The Pocono 500 began in 1971, as part of the USAC National Championship Trail. It was part of USAC's "triple crown", consisting of the Indianapolis 500, Pocono 500, and California 500. The race was popular, and the unique track layout was said to have been designed specifically with Champ/Indy cars in mind. USAC sanctioned the event through 1981.

During the early years, the Pocono 500 utilized an expanded two-week schedule, shorter, but similar to that of Indianapolis. A week of practice was followed by two days of time trials (Saturday-Sunday), followed by race day the following weekend. In some years, qualifying also consisted of four-lap runs, mimicking Indy. During the USAC years, the race was held in late-June/early-July, and for a time, race day itself was scheduled around Independence Day. For the first number of years, the starting field consisted of 33 cars, lined up in eleven rows of three, the same as Indy.

For 1977, the race schedule was trimmed back to one week. Practice opened on Tuesday, with time trials scheduled for Thursday and Friday, and the race on Sunday. Additionally, qualifying was reduced to two-lap runs instead of four-lap runs. Despite financial issues, traffic woes, and seemingly constant weather problems, the "Indianapolis of the East" established itself as a popular race on the National Championship Trail, attracting crowds in excess of 100,000 spectators during most of the 1970s. Nevertheless, various squabbles between track ownership and the sanctioning body were common.

In 1979, the race occurred in the midst of the first USAC/CART "Split". Nearly all of the CART-based teams skipped the event, angering track management, who remained loyal to USAC. Attendance and revenue dropped, and nearly bankrupted the facility. For 1980, IMS agreed to lease the track for the 1980 CRL schedule, which featured a full field of competitors. The 1981 race was even more controversial. Most CART teams again boycotted the event, and the track management ultimately sued for damages. USAC opened up the entry list to Silver Crown cars in order to fill out the grid, and it was run as a two-class race.

=== CART ===
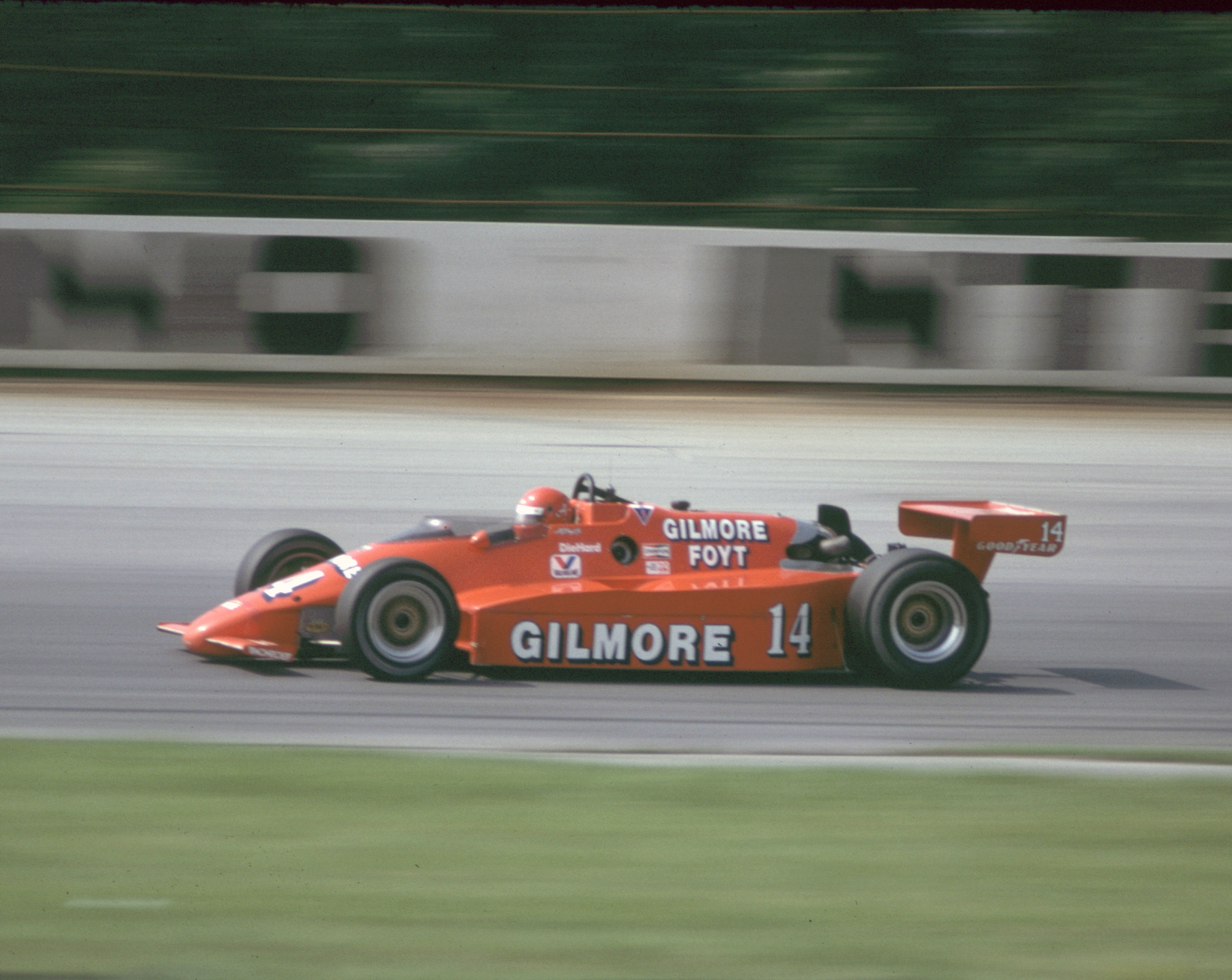
Foyt racing at Pocono in 1984

After organizational changes following the first USAC/CART "split," the Pocono 500 switched to the CART series beginning in 1982. The lawsuit filed by track owner/promoter Dr. Joseph Mattioli was settled out of court, and the CART series would race at the track for at least the next five years. The relationship between the two parties was tumultuous at times, but the event continued nevertheless through the decade of the 1980s. The race moved from June to August after the track added a second NASCAR Winston Cup Series race to their schedule. Moving to August allowed the race to be distanced from Indy, and was set two to three weeks after the Michigan 500, giving teams more preparation time between 500-mile races.

The increasingly rough condition of the course made the race demanding, and sometimes led to high attrition and surprise winners. The unique characteristics of the course, as well as the bumpiness, kept speeds slightly down from those at Indianapolis and Michigan, but the race was still popular, and for a time, was well-attended. Several major crashes in the latter years injured several drivers, including Johnny Rutherford, Kevin Cogan, John Andretti, Arie Luyendyk, Michael Greenfield, and Mario Andretti. By the late 1980s, drivers had become increasingly vocal about their displeasure with the condition of the track, some even calling for the event to be dropped.

Despite the ongoing squabbles between the series and the ownership, the race was the site of some memorable moments in Indy car history. In 1985, it was the site of Rick Mears' first win after recovering from his devastating injuries suffered in 1984. It was also the first and only Indy car win for the Judd AV engine, which occurred in 1988.

Following the 1989 event, the track was officially deemed too rough and unsuitable for Indy cars. The circuit still had metal boilerplate retaining walls, lacked catch fencing around the entire perimeter, and lacked proper runoff areas. It was heavily criticized for its roughness, cracks, and frequent debris that would cause dangerous tire punctures. Once, after Scott Pruett punctured seven tires during practice, car owner Steve Horne walked the track and returned with a handful of nails and other junk he had retrieved. The Pocono 500 was removed from the schedule indefinitely, as neither track management nor series officials were interested in continuing the event.

Though the track safety conditions were the reasons stated by the sanctioning body, track management also believed the event to be a money-loser for the facility. Furthermore, according to CART medical director Dr. Steve Olvey, during the 1980s the track's medical facilities were grossly inadequate, with track owner Dr. Joe Mattioli himself listed as the "track doctor," despite his profession being dentistry.

=== IndyCar ===
During both 2010 NASCAR Sprint Cup Series races, heavy crashes on the Long Pond Straight sent circuit management to call for significant safety improvements to the track. SAFER barriers were added to inside walls, catch fencing was installed around the entire perimeter, paved runoff areas were built around the majority of the infield. The safety upgrades, as well as changes announced by the third-generation Igdalsky family (including repaving the circuit with new concrete pit stalls), led to discussions with IndyCar officials regarding the revival of the Pocono IndyCar race.

Speculation ran rampant in 2012 after the cancellation of the Indy Qingdao 600 that Pocono could have been used as a last-minute substitute. However, nothing materialized. On October 1, 2012, the track officially announced they would host the Pocono IndyCar 400 for the IndyCar Series on July 4 weekend starting in 2013. The change in race distance was requested by broadcaster ABC.

For 2014, the race returned to its traditional 500-mile distance. The three 500-mile "triple crown" races (Indianapolis, Fontana, and Pocono) would also award drivers double points towards the championship. For 2015, the race secured the title sponsorship of ABC Supply Co., and was moved to its once familiar calendar slot in late-August.

After relatively clean, nearly caution-free races in 2013–2014, tragedy struck in 2015. Driver Justin Wilson was struck in the head by a piece of debris which had flown off of Sage Karam's crashed car. Wilson was airlifted to the hospital but died the next day from his injuries. In 2018, Robert Wickens was paralyzed from the waist down after a huge crash saw him get up into the catchfence. A year later in 2019, another huge pileup on the opening lap saw Felix Rosenqvist flip up into the catchfence, but no drivers were seriously injured.

On September 1, 2019, the 2020 IndyCar schedule was released, along with the announcement that they would not be returning to Pocono in 2020. It marked the second time that the track had been taken off the Indy car schedule. The race was replaced with a revived event at Richmond - a race that was later cancelled due to the COVID-19 pandemic. It was not confirmed if the removal of Pocono was permanent, and the reasons for the removal were unclear. Drivers Sage Karam and Robert Wickens tweeted that the track was too dangerous for Indy cars, citing major crashes in 2018 and 2019. In their press conference after the 2019 race, Scott Dixon, Will Power, and Simon Pagenaud defended the track's safety and expressed desire that IndyCar would return. Speculation during 2020 suggested the possibility of a return for IndyCar to Pocono beyond 2021, though as of now, there are no confirmed plans for IndyCar to return to Pocono Raceway. With NASCAR experimenting with running their two Pocono races as a doubleheader, it leaves room for an IndyCar weekend. While Pocono Raceway has expressed disappointment and left the door open for a potential return in the future, IndyCar has moved on.

== Past winners ==
Season	Date	Driver	Team	Chassis	Engine	Race Distance		Race Time	Average Speed (mph)	Report
Season	Date	Driver	Team	Chassis	Engine	Laps	Miles (km)	Race Time	Average Speed (mph)	Report
USAC Championship Car
1971	July 3	(United States) Mark Donohue	Penske Racing	McLaren	Offy	200	500 (804.672)	3:36:22	138.649	Report
1972	July 29	(United States) Joe Leonard	Vel's Parnelli Jones Racing	Parnelli	Offy	200	500 (804.672)	3:13:49	154.781	Report
1973	July 1	(United States) A. J. Foyt	A. J. Foyt Enterprises	Coyote	Foyt	200	500 (804.672)	3:26:58	144.948	Report
1974	June 30	(United States) Johnny Rutherford	Bruce McLaren Motor Racing	McLaren	Offy	200	500 (804.672)	3:11:27	156.701	Report
1975	June 29	(United States) A. J. Foyt	A. J. Foyt Enterprises	Coyote	Foyt	170*	425 (683.971)	3:01:13	140.712	Report
1976	June 27	(United States) Al Unser	Vel's Parnelli Jones Racing	Parnelli	Cosworth	200	500 (804.672)	3:28:53	143.622	Report
1977	June 26	(United States) Tom Sneva	Penske Racing	McLaren	Cosworth	200	500 (804.672)	3:17:12	152.931	Report
1978	June 25	(United States) Al Unser	Chaparral Cars	Lola T500	Cosworth	200	500 (804.672)	3:30:53	142.261	Report
1979	June 24	(United States) A. J. Foyt	A. J. Foyt Enterprises	Parnelli	Cosworth	200	500 (804.672)	3:42:14	134.995	Report
1980	June 22	(United States) Bobby Unser	Penske Racing	Penske	Cosworth	200	500 (804.672)	3:18:04	151.454	Report
1981	June 14	(United States) A. J. Foyt	A. J. Foyt Enterprises	March	Cosworth	122*	305 (490.849)	2:13:23	137.196	Report
CART Championship Car
1982	August 15	(United States) Rick Mears	Penske Racing	Penske	Cosworth	200	500 (804.672)	3:25:39	145.879	Report
1983	August 14	(Italy) Teo Fabi	Forsythe Racing	March	Cosworth	200	500 (804.672)	3:42:28	134.852	Report
1984	August 19	(United States) Danny Sullivan	Doug Shierson Racing	Lola	Cosworth	200	500 (804.672)	3:38:29	137.303	Report
1985	August 18	(United States) Rick Mears	Penske Racing	March	Cosworth	200	500 (804.672)	3:17:47	151.676	Report
1986	August 17	(United States) Mario Andretti	Newman/Haas Racing	Lola	Cosworth	200	500 (804.672)	3:17:13	152.106	Report
1987	August 16	(United States) Rick Mears	Penske Racing	March	Chevrolet-Ilmor	200	500 (804.672)	3:11:50	156.373	Report
1988	August 21	(United States) Bobby Rahal	Truesports	Lola	Judd	200	500 (804.672)	3:44:21	133.713	Report
1989	August 20	(United States) Danny Sullivan	Penske Racing	Penske	Chevrolet-Ilmor	200	500 (804.672)	2:55:43	170.72	Report
1990 – 2012	Not held									
IndyCar Series
2013	July 7	(New Zealand) Scott Dixon	Chip Ganassi Racing	Dallara DW12	Honda	160	400 (643.738)	2:04:26	192.864	Report
2014	July 6	(Colombia) Juan Pablo Montoya	Team Penske	Dallara DW12	Chevrolet	200	500 (804.672)	2:28:13	202.402	Report
2015	August 23	(United States) Ryan Hunter-Reay	Andretti Autosport	Dallara DW12	Honda	200	500 (804.672)	3:25:08	146.245	Report
2016	August 22*	(Australia) Will Power	Team Penske	Dallara DW12	Chevrolet	200	500 (804.672)	2:46:29	180.198	Report
2017	August 20	(Australia) Will Power	Team Penske	Dallara DW12	Chevrolet	200	500 (804.672)	2:43:17	183.737	Report
2018	August 19	(United States) Alexander Rossi	Andretti Autosport	Dallara DW12	Honda	200	500 (804.672)	2:36:49	191.304	Report
2019	August 18	(Australia) Will Power	Team Penske	Dallara DW12	Chevrolet	128*	320 (514.88)	1:53:45	168.771	Report

- 1975, 1981, and 2019: Race shortened due to rain.
- 2016: Race postponed from Sunday to Monday due to rain.

=== USAC Mini-Indy series ===
- 1979: Ronn Gregg
- 1980: Josele Garza

=== Indy Lights ===
Season	Date	Driver	Chassis	Engine	Race Distance		Race Time	Average Speed (mph)
Season	Date	Driver	Chassis	Engine	Laps	Miles (km)	Race Time	Average Speed (mph)
1986	August 16	(United States) Jeff Andretti	March	Buick	40	100 (160.934)	0:40:52	146.812
1987	August 16	(Republic of Ireland) Tommy Byrne	March	Buick	40	100 (160.934)	0:35:34	168.7
1988	August 20	(United States) Michael Greenfield	March	Buick	40	100 (160.934)	0:45:45	131.137
1989	August 20*	(Republic of Ireland) Tommy Byrne	March	Buick	28	70 (112.654)	0:34:17	122.512
1990 – 2012	Not held							
2013	July 6	(Colombia) Carlos Muñoz	Dallara	Infiniti	40	100 (160.934)	0:32:47	182.948
2014	July 5	(Colombia) Gabby Chaves	Dallara	Infiniti	40	100 (160.934)	0:36:53	162.7

- 1989: Race postponed due to rain.

== Race summaries ==
=== USAC Championship Trail ===
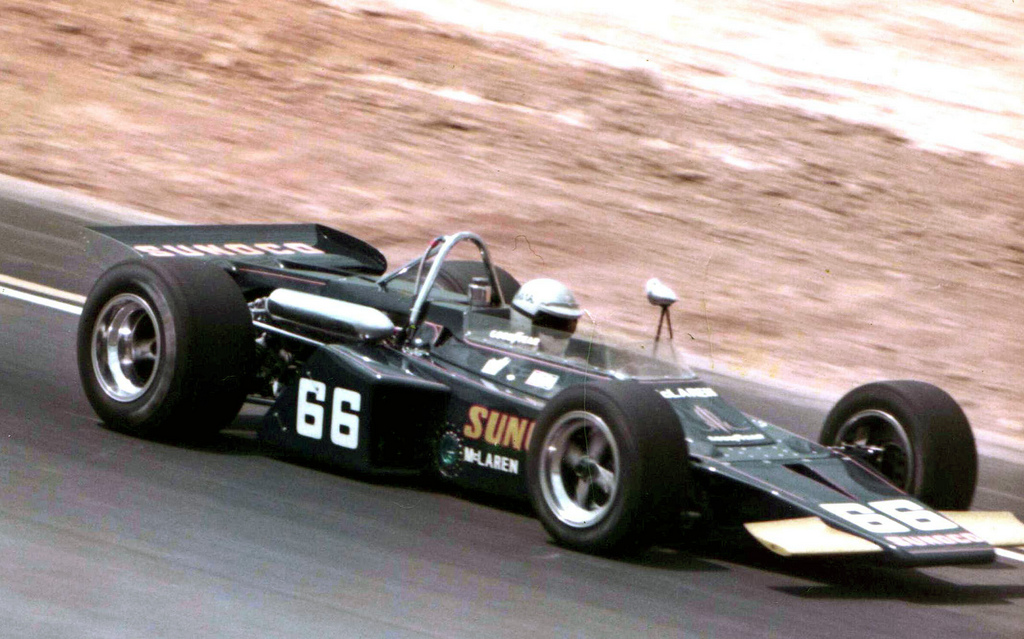
Mark Donohue won the inaugural Pocono 500 in 1971.

==== 1971 ====
The inaugural Pocono 500 was held on Independence Day weekend of 1971. The teams arrived on June 19 for a week of practice, then two days of time trials (June 26–27). local hero Mark Donohue, from the Philly suburb of Marcus Hook, won the pole position with a four-lap average speed of 172.393 mph. Going into the race, many drivers were anxious about the unusual design of the track, and the bumpy pavement. Raceday itself was marred by a massive traffic jam on the three mile stretch of single lane of PA-115 between the track and the I-80 Blakeslee exit, as it was the sole entry for fans arriving from both the Philadelphia metropolitan area and New York metropolitan area. The 33-car field (mimicking the traditional 33-car field at Indy) took the green flag in front of 75,000 spectators. Prior to the race, it was announced that the "pack-up" rule would be used during caution periods, the first Indy car 500-mile race to utilize it, which resulted in unprecedented close racing. Donohue took the lead at the start, and led the first 32 laps. A mandatory four pit stop rule came into play, shuffling the field at times, but Donohue stayed within reach of the lead most of the afternoon. In the closing stages, Donohue led Joe Leonard, and A. J. Foyt. A caution came out on lap 183 when Art Pollard's car spilled oil down the Long Pond straight and into the tunnel turn. The field bunched up for a restart on lap 190, with Leonard right on the back bumper of Donohue. Down the mainstretch, Donohue got the jump and held the lead. However, going into turn two, Donohue nearly crashed when he was over-cautious driving through the oil-dry. He had to back out of the throttle, and slid up the track, allowing Leonard to dive underneath and take the lead. With the crowd on their feet, Donohue chased down Leonard and re-took the lead for good at the Tunnel Turn on lap 199, to the cheers and screams of the crowd. Donohue held off Leonard by 1.6 seconds, believed to be the closest finish in a 500-mile Indy car race at the time. It was also Roger Penske's first win in Champ car, a feat he repeated on the 50th anniversary with Josef Newgarden at Mid-Ohio. It was also the last time a front engine roadster qualified for a Champ Car race, with Jim Hurtubise's #57 Miller High Life Special making the field. Post-race, a near-disaster occurred when the 6,000 gallon tanker truck collecting the leftover methanol in the pit lane overflowed, with it sloshing forward onto the hot engine of the tractor as it was making a stop; and the driver jumped out of the cab and dove over the pit wall, fearing an explosion.

==== 1972 ====
The second annual 500, the then-named 1972 Schaefer 500 at Pocono, was scheduled for Sunday July 2. Practice was scheduled to begin on Sunday June 18, with time trials to be held Saturday June 24 and Sunday June 25. However, Hurricane Agnes swept through the eastern United States, and wreaked havoc on the proceedings. Rain washed out practice and qualifying for a total of ten days. Catastrophic flooding in the area prompted officials to postpone time trials, as some roads leading to the track were closed, and local police were tending to the disaster areas. Meanwhile, the track grounds were heavily saturated, and the flooding had caused sewage disposal problems. Track officials, with the suggestion of Governor Shapp, insisted they must reschedule the race for later in the summer, but USAC angrily refused. After eleven days, only two days had seen track activity. Frustration and tempers were flaring in the paddock. On the evening of Wednesday June 28, the race was finally cancelled by the promoters. After a few days of negotiations with USAC, the controversy fizzled, and the race was rescheduled for Saturday July 29. It would be held as part of a USAC Indy car/USAC Stock Car 500-mile doubleheader weekend.

In the last week of July, the series returned for the rescheduled race. However, defending race winner Mark Donohue was absent, recuperating from a knee injury. Bobby Unser won the pole position with a new four-lap track record of 189.473 mph. Gordon Johncock qualified second, and Mario Andretti third. After controversy had overshadowed the event back in June, more controversy would come to pass at the conclusion of the race itself.

Polesitter Bobby Unser was not much of a factor during the race, leading only six laps and dropping out with a gearbox problem. Mario Andretti led 105 laps, and was over 40 seconds ahead of second place Joe Leonard when he came in for his final scheduled pit stop on lap 164. Andretti's routine pit stop turned into disaster when his gear shift linkage seized. Andretti lost 11 laps as his crew attempted to get the car back into gear, and he fell to a 7th-place finish. Gary Bettenhausen, who dropped out while leading at Indianapolis earlier in the year, led 40 laps at Pocono but again dropped out while leading. After Andretti's misfortune, Joe Leonard inherited the lead. Johnny Rutherford and Al Unser were running 2nd and 3rd, both a lap down. On lap 173, Jimmy Caruthers had a fiery crash in turn three. Leonard ducked into the pits for fuel, allowing Rutherford and Unser to get back on the lead lap. One lap later, Leonard suffered a cut tire, and had to pit a second time. When the green flag was coming back out on lap 182, Unser had blown by Rutherford to take second, and one lap later, passed Leonard for the lead. Though some in attendance believed Unser was not actually on the lead lap, the scoreboards showed Unser in first place. Unser led to the finish, taking the checkered flag as the surprise winner. After the race, Unser was penalized one lap for passing under the caution. A post-race review indicated that Unser had passed Rutherford before the green light had come on. Official results posted Joe Leonard first, Johnny Rutherford second, and Al Unser a lap down in third. The following day, Roger McCluskey won the USAC Stock Car Pennsylvania 500 driving a Plymouth Superbird.

==== 1973 ====
In response to the tragic 1973 Indianapolis 500 in May, emergency rule changes were put into place before the cars arrived at Pocono on June 18, to prepare for the then-named 1973 Schaefer 500. Rear wings were reduced in size from 64 inches to 55 inches; on-board fuel capacity was reduced from 70 gallons down to 40 gallons; and fuel tanks were only allowed on the left side of the car, with the exception of a 2 1/2 gallon pick-up tank. An energy-absorbing material was to be placed in the spot formerly occupied by the right-side tank, and total fuel allotment for the 500 miles was reduced from 375 to 340 gallons. Despite the rule changes, Peter Revson won the pole position with a new four-lap track record of 190.648 mph. In the days leading up to the race, torrential rains pelted the area, flooding the grounds, and turned the infield into a sea of mud. Despite the quagmire, a record crowd of 75,000-100,000 spectators arrived on a sunny race day on July 1. The new fuel rules dominated the afternoon, as the leaders needed as many as eleven pit stops to go the distance. Attrition was high, as only seven cars were running at the finish. A record 28 lead changes occurred, however, all but two were made during pit stop shuffles. Mechanical problems sidelined Mario Andretti, Mark Donohue, Bobby Unser, and others. Johnny Rutherford spun twice during the race, while Al Unser and Gary Bettenhausen both crashed. While leading on lap 136, Indy 500 winner Gordon Johncock ran over debris on the mainstretch and loudly blew a tire. In the closing laps, Roger McCluskey led A. J. Foyt. McCluskey made his final pit stop on lap 173, and the crew short-filled his tank, calculating what they thought was just enough fuel to make it to the finish. One lap later, Foyt pitted, but back out on the track, he started developing a bad vibration. Both McCluskey and Foyt were attempting to stretch their fuel to the finish, and McCluskey was now out to an 8-second lead. With handling problems getting worse, Foyt elected to pit again on lap 193, changing tires and taking on additional fuel. McCluskey now held a seemingly insurmountable 40-second lead with five laps to go. On the final lap, McCluskey ran out of fuel going into turn one, handing the lead and the victory to Foyt. It was the first of four wins for Foyt at the Pocono 500.

==== 1974 ====
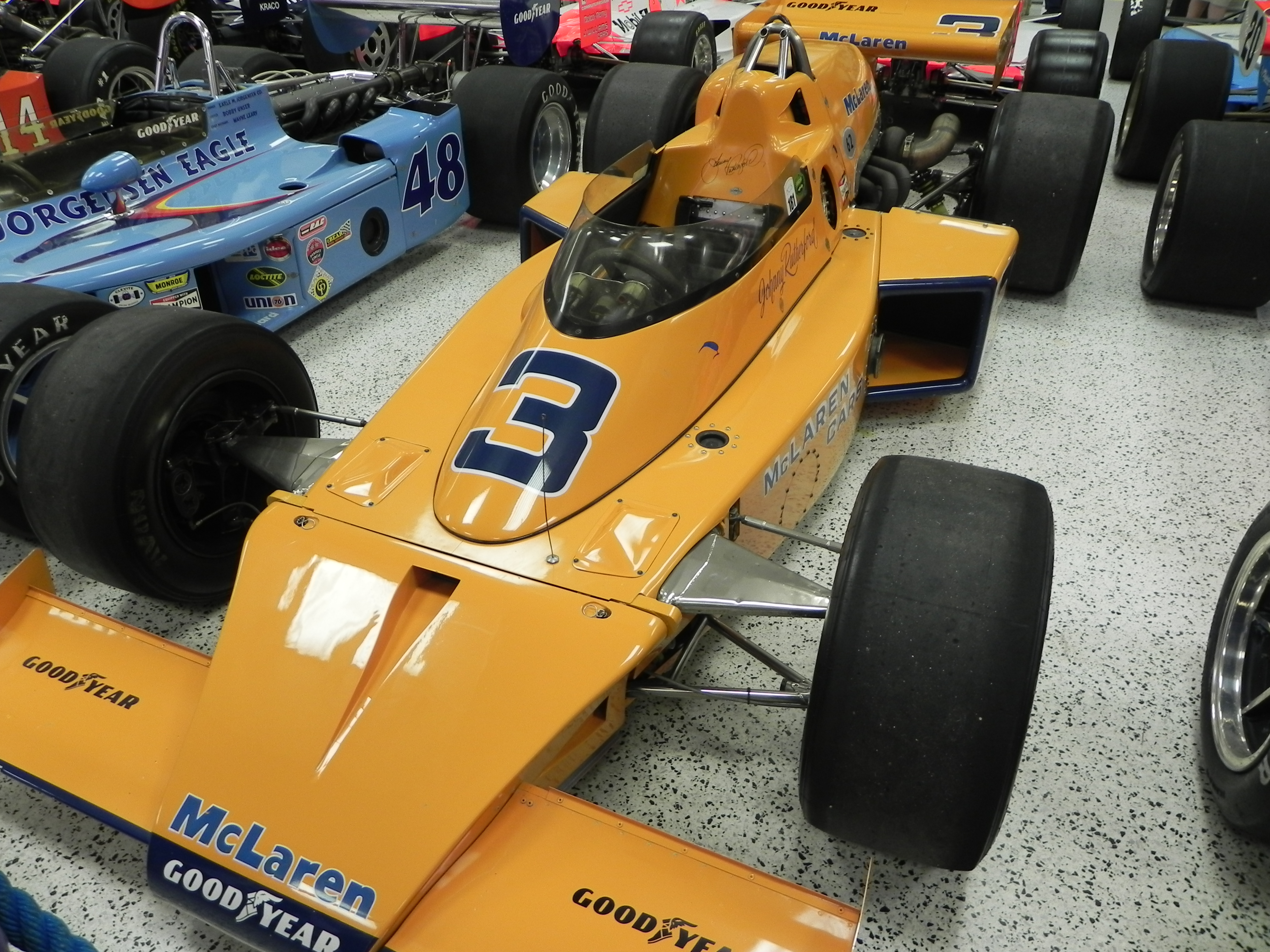
Johnny Rutherford won the Indy 500 and Pocono 500 in 1974 driving the McLaren M16C.

Johnny Rutherford, who won the Indianapolis 500 one month earlier, was victorious at Pocono, becoming the first driver to win two of the Indy car Triple Crown races in one season. Rutherford and the McLaren team stuck to a strict fuel conservation strategy and ran a steady pace, while many other teams ran their cars out of fuel. Mario Andretti set the pace early, taking the lead on lap 10, and leading a total of 57 laps in the first half. However, on lap 133, Bill Simpson blew an engine dumping oil on the track, and Andretti running right behind him, spun in the oil and crashed. Late in the race, Wally Dallenbach led polesitter Bobby Unser, Rutherford, and Jimmy Caruthers. Unser started fading, however, as he was running low on his fuel allotment. The leaders made their final pit stops around lap 181, with Unser not having any fuel remaining in his pitside tank except what was left in the hose. Back out on the track, a two-man duel to the finish between Dallenbach and Rutherford was about to materialize, with Caruthers moving up to third. The exiting finish fizzled when Dallenbach blew a piston on lap 188. Rutherford cruised to the finish, while Caruthers barely made it home to finish second, running out of fuel on a cool down lap. Bobby Unser limped to a 5th-place finish three laps down, slowing down to 150 mph to save fuel. Defending race winner A. J. Foyt struggled during time trials, he first burned a piston, then broke a universal joint, before qualifying 29th. On race day, he tapped the wall and was forced to drop out after 20 laps with a damaged suspension.

==== 1975 ====
Rain delayed the start of the race by two hours. Just like the Indy 500 a month earlier, the race would be shortened due to rain. Polesitter Gordon Johncock (183.281 mph), took the lead at the start, and led 29 laps. One by one, however, most of the top contenders fell by the wayside. Johncock would crash in turn two on lap 139, and Mario Andretti suffered a burned piston. Johnny Rutherford battled mechanical problems all day, and Bobby Unser dropped out at the halfway mark with a broken drive shaft. Al Unser dropped out early with a manifold failure, and a broken oil pump put Jerry Grant nearly twenty laps down. A. J. Foyt avoided all trouble, and found himself the dominant car of the day. Foyt held off mild challenges from Bill Vukovich II and Jimmy Caruthers in the second half. With storm clouds looming in the distance, Foyt cranked up his turbocharger boost sometime around the 130-lap mark, gambling that the rain would end the race early. Foyt pulled out to a 15-second lead when the caution came out for rain on lap 168. Two laps later, a downpour ensued, sending the crowd of 110,000 scurrying for cover. Foyt was declared the winner, the first two-time winner at Pocono, with Wally Dallenbach second. Gary Bettenhausen charged from 31st starting position to finish fifth.

==== 1976 ====
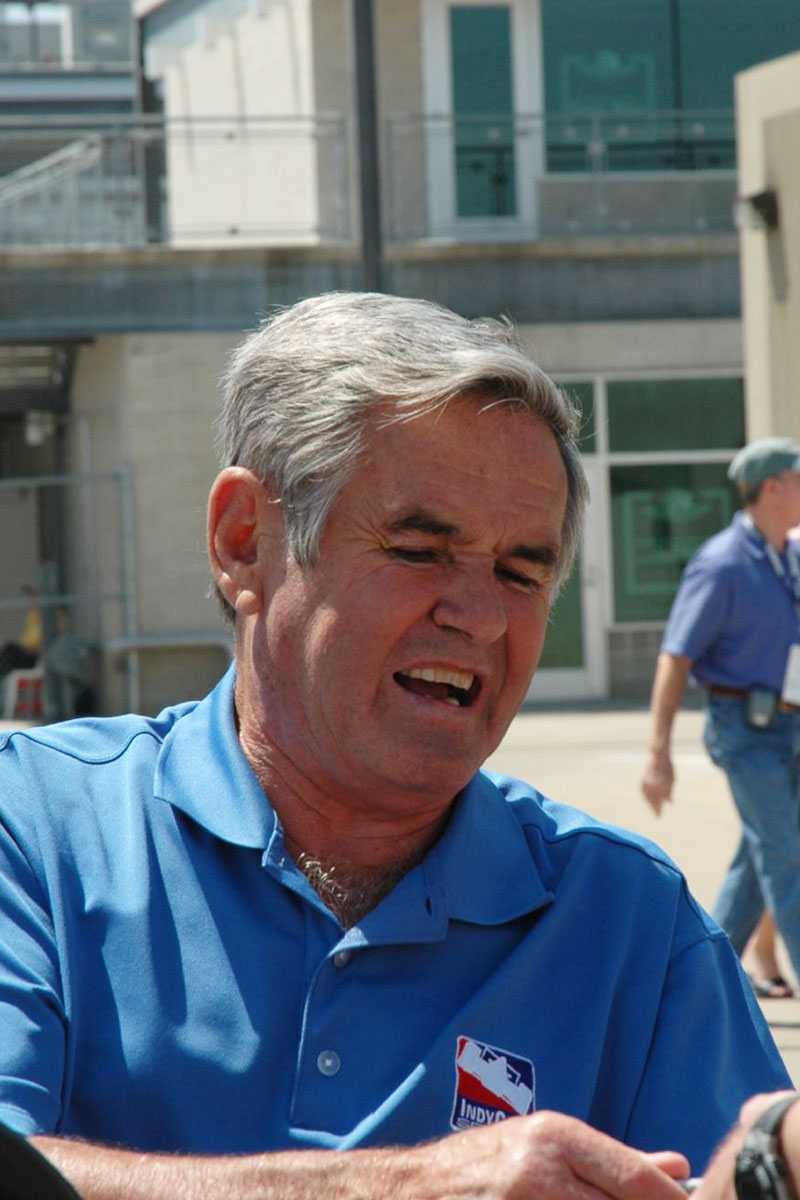
Al Unser won the Pocono 500 in 1976 and 1978.

Rain washed out two days of scheduled qualifying, and USAC officials set the starting field by a lottery system. The top 30 positions were filled by a draw, and the final three spots were left open, to be filled by a last-chance qualifying session on Thursday. Johnny Parsons drew the pole position, with Bill Vukovich II second, and Mario Andretti on the outside of the front row. Andretti grabbed the lead at the start, but A. J. Foyt passed Andretti to take the lead on lap 7. Foyt's turn at the front was short-lived, as he blew his engine on lap 31. After starting 16th, Al Unser was charging up the field and took the lead for the first time on lap 32. Unser, however, suffered two setbacks that nearly cost him the race. During a routine pit stop on lap 58, the pneumatic jack on Unser's car failed, necessitating the use of a hand jack. Unser came out of the pits a lap down. Later on lap 76, Unser cut a tire down the mainstretch, and had to limp back to the pits. Unser re-joined the race just ahead of leader Andretti, at that point just seconds away from being two laps down. On lap 88, a fortuitous caution came out for a spin by Al Loquasto, and that allowed Al Unser to circle around and catch up to the back of the field. Running one lap down, Unser's Parnelli/Cosworth chased down Andretti's Penske McLaren/Offy and he un-lapped himself on lap 104. John Martin stalled on lap 115, bringing out another caution, and Unser made up the rest of the lap. The green flag came back out on lap 119, and three laps later Unser blew by Andretti to take the lead. Unser cruised the rest of the way, and Mario Andretti faded after he broke an anti-sway bar on lap 179. With the victory, Al Unser secured the first Indy car win for the Cosworth engine. After not qualifying at Indianapolis, Janet Guthrie started her first 500-mile Indy car race, placing 24th with a cracked transmission case after 89 laps.

==== 1977 ====
Three weeks after winning his record fourth Indianapolis 500, A. J. Foyt threatened to skip the Pocono 500 after getting into a dispute with USAC series sponsor Citicorp. Foyt skipped practice on Tuesday, and after running only 35 practice laps Wednesday, still insisted he might put another driver in his car. Nevertheless, Foyt changed his mind at the last minute and qualified the car. Foyt put secured the pole position (189.474 mph), bumping Johnny Rutherford from the top spot and prompted a chorus of boos from some fans in attendance. Mario Andretti qualified third to round out the front row. Tom Sneva, who broke the 200 mph barrier at Indy in May, placed fourth on the grid. During final practice on Friday, Andretti's engine over-revved, and it suffered bent valves. It was the fifth engine that Penske teammates Andretti and Sneva had gone through for the week. Without another spare, the crew was forced to salvage parts from one of the already-blown engines to get Andretti on the grid for race day.

A. J. Foyt took the lead at the start, and led 26 of the first 60 laps. His day would be cut short on lap 118 with a burned piston. High attrition saw more than half the field eliminated before lap 100, and only eight cars left running at the finish. The race settled down among four contenders: Patrick teammates Gordon Johncock and Wally Dallenbach, and Penske teammates Mario Andretti and Tom Sneva. In the second half, Andretti and Sneva were in control, but both were suffering various mechanical problems. Andretti once had to pit for an engine issue, while both Andretti and Sneva had failing brakes. While leading the race on lap 161, Andretti cut a tire and headed to the pits. Without brakes, he overshot his pit stall and had to go around the track once more before receiving service. Sneva, coping better with his brakes, put Andretti a lap down. On lap 187, Mike Mosley wrecked in turn two, bringing out a yellow. On the restart on lap 193, Andretti got the jump and passed Sneva to get his lap back. Seconds later the caution was out again when a leftover piece of debris was spotted at the crash site. Andretti circled around to make up the rest of the lap. With four laps to go, the green came out once again, but this time Sneva was able to stay ahead. Andretti made up some ground, but Sneva crossed the finish line 1.75 seconds ahead. It was Penske's second Pocono 500 victory, and the team's first 1st-2nd sweep in a 500-mile Indy car race.

==== 1978 ====
Danny Ongais won the pole position and led 59 laps. However, nearly identical to his outing at Indianapolis a month earlier, he blew his engine while leading the race on lap 130. The race shaped up as a duel between Indy 500 winner Al Unser and Johnny Rutherford, with Tom Sneva in close pursuit. After Ongais dropped out, Unser came to the lead, having driven a steady, fuel and tire conserving pace. On lap 161, Rutherford pitted, and came out still holding the lead. Three laps later, Rutherford believed he had a flat tire, and had to make an unscheduled pit stop. The team determined there was no puncture, but by then it was too late. By the time Rutherford returned to the track, Unser had pulled out to a 20-second lead. Unser made his final pit stop on lap 177, briefly relinquishing his lead. Sneva and Rutherford made their final pit stops, and by lap 190, Unser had cycled back into first place. Rutherford went on a charge over the final nine laps, in a desperate attempt to catch Unser. Rutherford touched wheels passing the lapped car of Wally Dallenbach on lap 198, drawing the ire of Dallenbach, as well as Sneva who witnessed the incident in his mirrors. On the final lap, going into turn one Sneva was able to block Rutherford, but moments later Sneva sputtered out of fuel. Rutherford sailed by to take second, while Unser went on to win. Sneva limped to a third-place finish.

The win Al Unser's third consecutive 500-mile race victory, having won the 1977 Ontario 500 and 1978 Indianapolis 500. Unser would go on to win at Ontario again in September 1978, winning USAC's "triple crown", the first and only driver in history to do so. Mario Andretti's ongoing misfortunes at Pocono continued, as he dropped out with gearbox failure. After leading twenty laps in the first half, A. J. Foyt was not a factor in the second half, suffering engine failure with ten laps to go. After numerous cautions in the first laf, the final 89 laps were run under green. During practice, a controversy stirred, as several drivers, most outspokenly Pancho Carter, complained of bad bumps in the Tunnel Turn.

==== 1979 ====
The race took place just one month after the tumultuous 1979 month of May at Indianapolis. Nearly all CART-based teams skipped the event, with the exception of Danny Ongais. A field of only 25 cars took the green flag in front of 50,000 spectators, who braved chilly, 50-degree temperatures and 30 mph winds. An exciting first half saw Danny Ongais take the lead at the start from polesitter A. J. Foyt. Several contenders battled for the lead in the first half, but one by one they each fell by the wayside. On lap 58, Eldon Rasmussen lost a rear wing, and crashed head-on into the outside wall in turn one. He was knocked unconscious, and suffered a broken ankle, broken ribs, and a concussion. Roger McCluskey charged to the front, leading six laps, but dropped out on lap 102 after a separated radiator rubbed against the rear wheels, shredding a tire and sending him into a spin. Tom Bigelow's chances for victory ended when he ran out of fuel on lap 122, and later lost a radiator. Foyt, Ongais, and Larry Dickson emerged as the contenders in the second half. Ongais and Foyt pitted on laps 136–137, Foyt taking on fuel only, Ongais taking on both tires and fuel. The new tires proved advantageous, as Ongais subsequently pulled out to an 18-second lead over Foyt, with Dickson lurking in third. Ongais, however, blew his engine on lap 148, handing the lead back to Foyt. Dickson suffered fuel pickup problems on lap 161, forcing him to the pits and he lost a lap before returning to the track. Foyt cruised over the final 100 miles to victory, winning by two laps over Jim McElreath. Only seven cars were running at the finish. Dickson, while running second, coasted to the pits with three laps to go. He still managed a third-place finish. It was Foyt's 65th-career Indy car win, fourth win of the season, and third at Pocono.

==== 1980 ====
The 1980 TrueValue Hardware 500 at Pocono was held as part of the 1980 CRL season, the joint USAC/CART sanctioning arrangement. It was the next-to-last race before CART pulled out and proceeded with their own championship for 1980. The race was run using 48 inHG of turbocharger boost, the same used a month earlier at Indianapolis, but down from the 60 inHG permitted at Ontario in April. Bobby Unser won the pole position with a two-lap average speed of 185.491 mph, but A. J. Foyt who qualified second, drew controversy after qualifying. After noticeably struggling earlier in the year at Ontario and Indianapolis, Foyt turned the fastest single qualifying lap (185.874 mph), which led some to accuse him of cheating by over-boosting the engine or illegally using nitrous. Foyt denied the allegations, and no action was taken. At the start, Foyt got the jump and led the field into turn one. Foyt led 67 of the first 85 laps until he dropped out with broken valve. The race shaped up as a battle between Bobby Unser and Johnny Rutherford, who started the race in a back-up car due to a practice crash. Unser led by 13 seconds before a caution came out on lap 151 due to a spin by Pancho Carter. On the ensuing restart on lap 158, Rutherford went four-wide down the mainstretch to grab the lead going into turn one. The lead was short-lived, as Unser powered by on lap 164. On the final round of pit stops, Rutherford's chances for victory were dashed when he blew his clutch and stalled the engine. Rutherford had to be push-started, and lost many seconds. One lap later, Unser had a near-flawless pit stop, taking on fuel only, and maintained the lead. Unser won by 21.03 seconds, his first and only victory at Pocono.

==== 1981 ====
In the height of the USAC/CART split, A. J. Foyt won the USAC Van Scoy Diamond Mines 500. This was the final Indy car race USAC sanctioned at Pocono and Foyt's final Indy car win. Many CART regulars boycotted the race, therefore, USAC opened the field to both Gold Crown cars and Silver Crown cars. A rag-tag field of Indy cars and front- engine dirt-track cars ran a two-class race. Tom Sneva, one of the few CART drivers who defied the boycott, won the pole and dominated the early stages but retired with a broken transmission. Geoff Brabham, another CART driver who would face a suspension from his primary series for competing, then battled Foyt for the lead. Rain ended the race after 122 of a scheduled 200 laps, with Foyt in front.

=== CART PPG Indy Car World Series ===
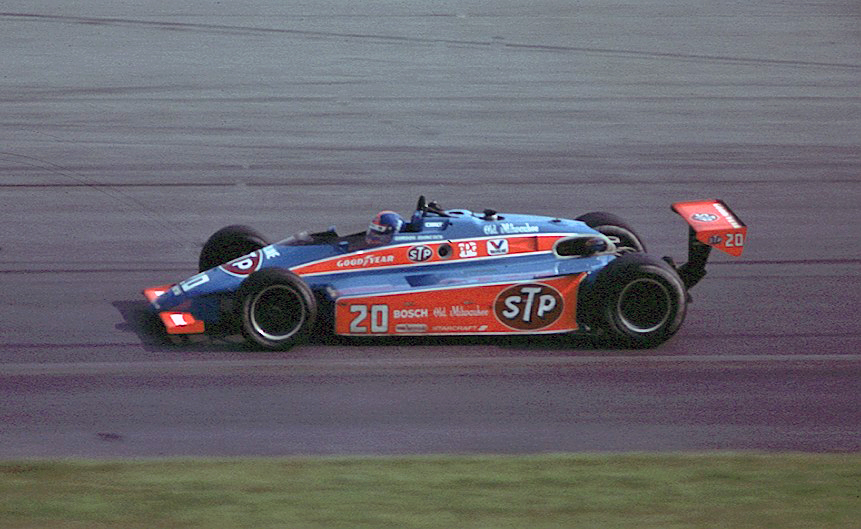
Gordon Johncock at Pocono

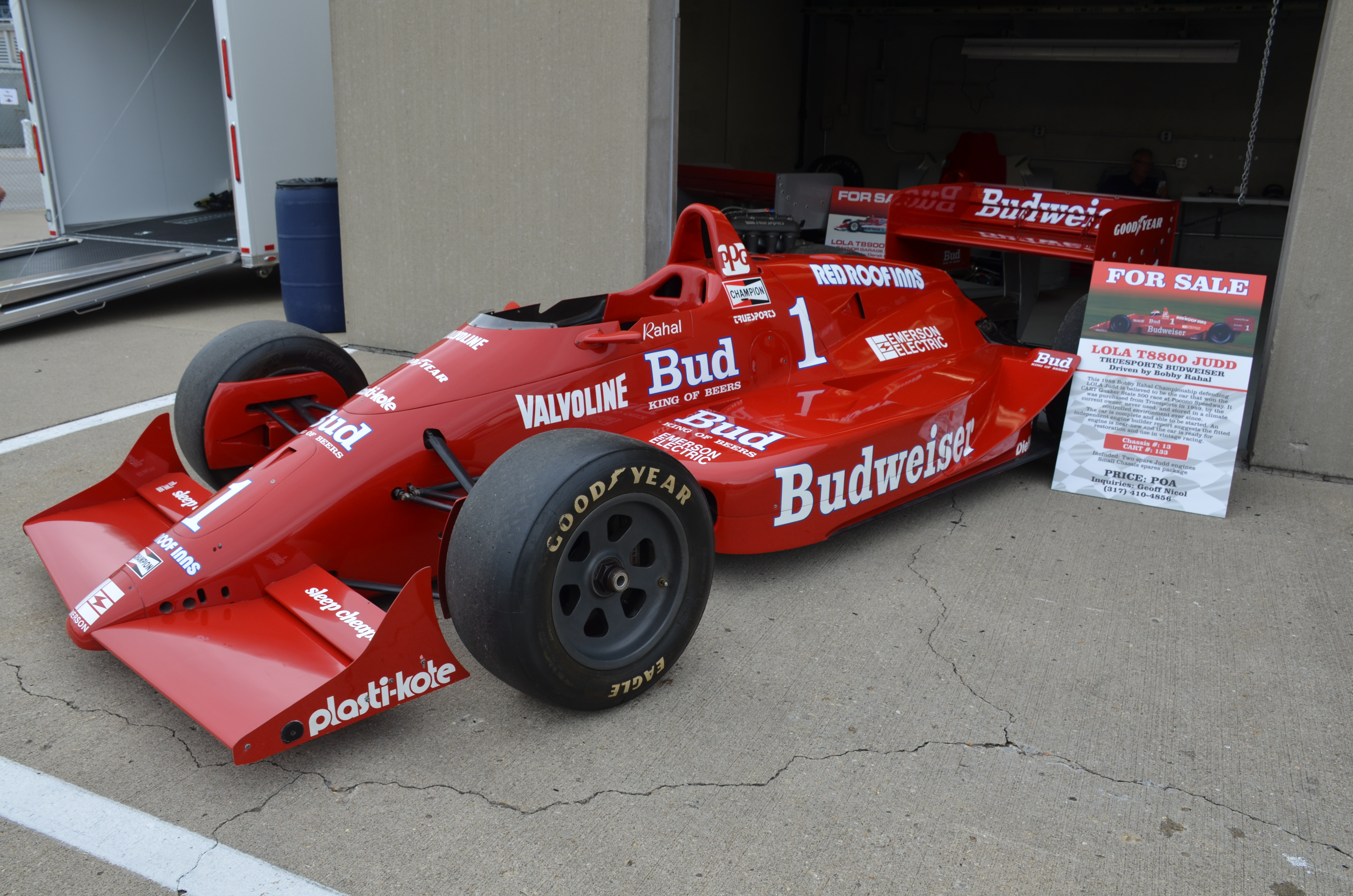
1988 Pocono 500 winning car driven by Bobby Rahal.

- 1982: Initially the Pocono 500 was not on the schedule for 1982. Track management had sued CART for damages after they boycotted the 1981 race. But by the following spring, the issued had been settled, and the race was added back to the schedule in early May. On race day, Rick Mears dominated, leading 146 of the 200 laps. Gordon Johncock, the winner at Indianapolis and Michigan, was looking to sweep the Indy car "triple crown", but his gearbox failed while running second on lap 193. The only major incident of the day involved Johnny Rutherford. His car blew a right rear tire, and he crashed in turn one. The car became airborne, and almost left the track. The broken car landed back on the track, and Rutherford suffered a broken hand.
- 1983: Rookies Teo Fabi and Al Unser Jr. combined to lead 143 of the 200 laps, and emerged as the only two contenders late in the race. During his final pit stop on lap 178, Unser Jr. nearly stalled, and handling problems slowed his pace. Fabi, who raised eyebrows by winning the pole at Indy, cruised to victory.
- 1984: An exciting three-car battle to the finish between Rick Mears, Bobby Rahal, and Danny Sullivan. With the three cars running nose-to-tail on lap 194, Rahal passed Mears going into turn one to take the lead. Down the Long Pond straight, Sullivan slipped by Mears as well, and set his sights on Rahal. In turn two, Sullivan passed Rahal, and pulled out to a sizable lead. Heavy traffic on the final lap allowed Mears to close up, but Sullivan held off the challenge at the checkered flag to win. Rahal finished third, blowing his engine as he crossed the finish line.
- 1985: Rick Mears completed a comeback from his devastating leg injuries suffered at Sanair in 1984 by winning the Pocono 500 in a part-time entry for Penske Racing.
- 1986: Mario Andretti and Bobby Rahal battled for the lead in the late stages of the race. On lap 174, Rahal suddenly pulled to the inside with an engine fire, leaving Andretti all alone in the lead. Andretti cruised over the final 26 laps, beating second place Kevin Cogan by over a lap.
- 1987: Mario Andretti led 22 laps, but got too low in turn one on lap 89, and crashed hard into the outside wall. He suffered a separated shoulder. The rough apron of turn one was stained by lime, which caused Andretti's car to lose traction Late in the race, Rick Mears was leading Roberto Guerrero. Mears had last pitted on lap 159, topping off his fuel during a caution. With five laps to go, Guerrero rushed into the pits for a splash-and-go. Mears stayed out, attempting to stretch his fuel to the end. On the final lap, Mears held a half a lap lead and coming off the final turn seemingly started to sputter. He was able to make it across the finish to take the win, his first victory since 1985, and the first 500-mile race win for the Ilmor-Chevrolet engine. Geoff Brabham finished second, the best finish yet for the new Brabham-Honda/Judd engine.
- 1988: The race was slowed 11 times for 65 laps, including six wrecks. Rookie John Andretti suffered a serious wreck with 18 laps to go near the pit exit. Most of the contenders dropped out, leaving Bobby Rahal in the lead for the final 28 laps. Rahal scored Judd's first and only Indy car victory, and it was Rahal's last win with Truesports.
- 1989: Emerson Fittipaldi sets a new all-time track record during qualifying, with a pole speed of 211.715 mph. Danny Sullivan held off his Penske teammate Rick Mears to win the final CART series race at Pocono. It was Sullivan's first victory since breaking his arm in a practice crash earlier in the season at Indianapolis. Track owner Joe Mattioli vowed that single-seater racing would never return to his circuit, a vow that ended after his death in 2012. The race name "Quaker State 500" was still used widely in 1989, even though Quaker State motor oil had dropped their title sponsorship. The name was instead tied to the state of Pennsylvania's nickname being "the Quaker state".

=== IndyCar Series ===
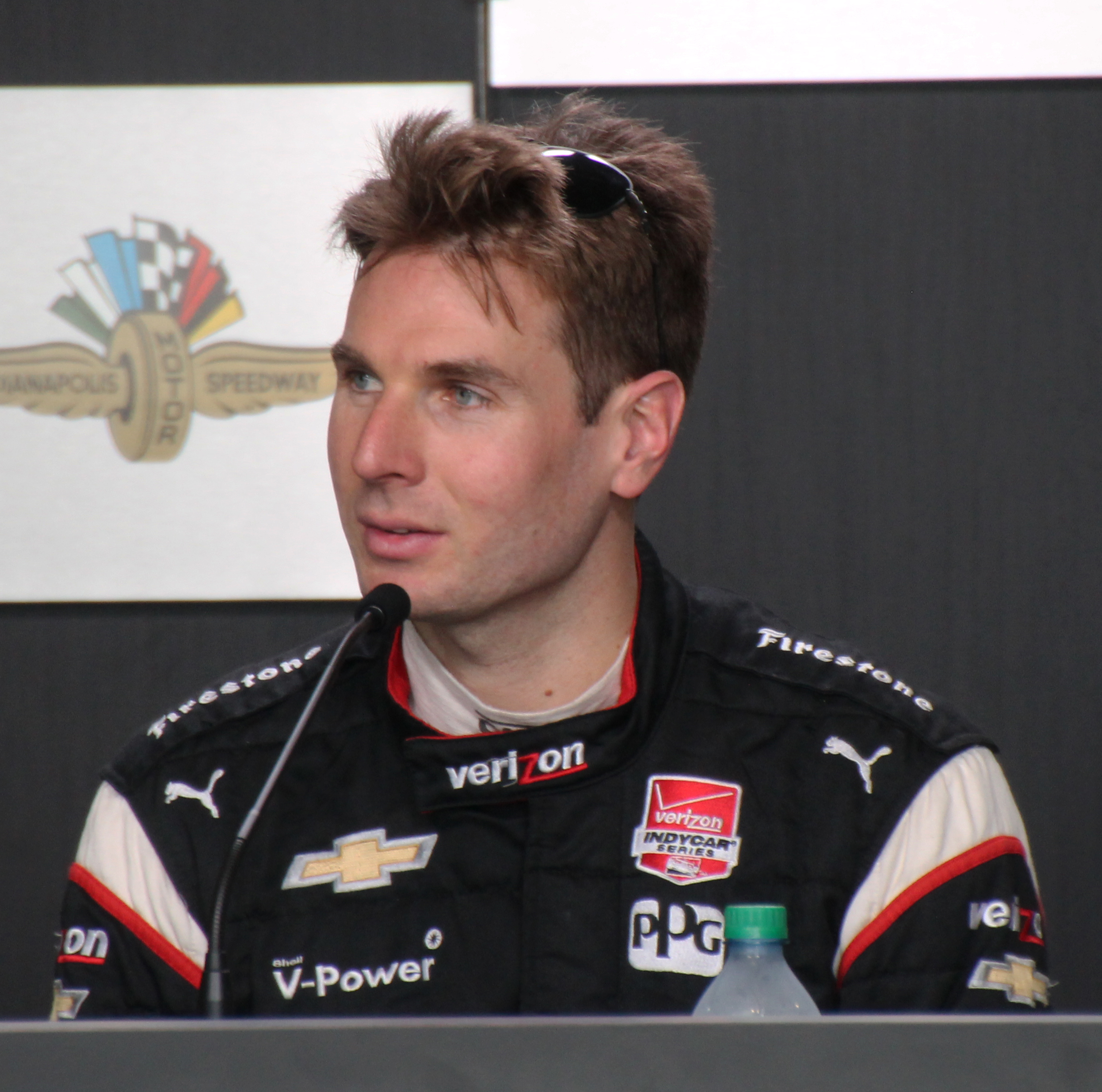
Will Power won the Pocono 500 three times (2016, 2017, 2019).

- 2013: The Igdalsky family, third-generation family members who took over the circuit after Joe Mattioli's death, visited an IZOD IndyCar Series race in 2012, and by the end of the season announced a revival of the race, with a distance scheduled of 400 miles. Pennsylvania native Chip Ganassi's team, Chip Ganassi Racing, swept the podium with Scott Dixon winning, Charlie Kimball second, and Dario Franchitti third. The average speed of 192.864 mph was a Pocono Raceway record, slowed by only two brief caution periods.
- 2014: Juan Pablo Montoya won the fastest 500 mile race in Indycar history. At an average speed of 202.402 mph, it was the first 500-mile race to average over 200 mph, and was slowed by only one caution for six laps. Montoya's victory capped off his return to the American open wheel circuit after spending the previous 13 season in Formula One and NASCAR.
- 2015: Ryan Hunter-Reay won the race. On lap 179, Sage Karam spun and a piece of debris from his car struck Justin Wilson on the head, knocking Wilson unconscious and sending him into the wall. Wilson was airlifted to Lehigh Valley Hospital–Cedar Crest in Allentown, where he succumbed to his injuries the following day.
- 2016: Rain postponed the race from Sunday until Monday. Pole sitter Mikhail Aleshin led 87 laps. With 35 laps to go Will Power took the lead, and shortly after, a late caution came out for debris. The green flag came out with 22 laps to go, with Power and Aleshin battling nose-to-tail to the finish. Ryan Hunter-Reay started last due to a practice crash, but managed to lead 31 laps. With Power and Aleshin finishing 1–2, Hunter-Reay, who pitted for tires under the yellow, dramatically charged through the field to finish third.
- 2017: Will Power fell a lap down after he was forced to pit to replace a broken nose cone on lap 65. Later in the race, he suffered a damaged rear wing assembly after being hit by Charlie Kimball. Power worked his way back to the lead lap, and through an out-of-sequence pit strategy took the lead on lap 154. Power had built such a large lead by lap 161 that he was able to pit without losing the lead. In the final nine laps, Power held off the furious challenge of Josef Newgarden, and became the first ever back-to-back winner of the Pocono 500.
- 2018: Alexander Rossi dominated and won the race. On lap 7, Robert Wickens and Ryan Hunter-Reay made contact in turn 2, which sent Wickens' car into the catchfence and caused a multicar wreck which also involved James Hinchcliffe, Takuma Sato and Pietro Fittipaldi. The race was red-flagged for two hours to repair the catchfence while Wickens was airlifted to Lehigh Valley Hospital–Cedar Crest with injuries to his legs, spine and right arm in addition to pulmonary contusion. Wickens would later reveal that the crash left him paralyzed from the waist down.
- 2019: For the second year in a row, a major crash early on took out several contenders. Three-wide down the Long Pond straight, Takuma Sato clipped wheels with Alexander Rossi, triggering a huge melee, which sent Felix Rosenqvist into the catchfence. No drivers were seriously injured, but a lengthy delay was needed to make repairs to the catchfencing, and the incident drew the ire of the paddock. When the race was restarted, Simon Pagenaud and Scott Dixon set the pace in the first half. Just after the halfway point, storm clouds began to appear to the west, threatening to end the race early. Will Power, who was off-sequence on pit stops due to running over debris on the first-lap crash, started charging, and took the lead on lap 115 after a sequence of pit stops. The red flag came out for lightning on lap 128, and with heavy rain approaching, Power was declared the winner with his third Pocono 500 win in four years. A few weeks later when the 2020 schedule was rolled out, the IndyCar Series would not be returning to Pocono in 2020, making Power the last winner of the event for the near future.
