= 2013 Pocono IndyCar 400 =

(United States) 2013 Pocono IndyCar 400
Race details
- 11th round of the 2013 IndyCar Series season
- Date: July 7, 2013
- Official name: Pocono IndyCar 400 Fueled by Sunoco
- Location: Long Pond, Pennsylvania
- Course: Permanent racing facility 2.5 mi / 4.023 km
- Distance: 160 laps 400 mi / 643.737 km
- Scheduled Distance: 160 laps 400 mi / 643.737 km
- Weather: Temperatures up to 91 °F (33 °C); wind speeds up to 11.1 miles per hour (17.9 km/h)

Pole position
- Driver: (United States) Marco Andretti (Andretti Autosport)
- Time: 40.6547

Fastest lap
- Driver: (Japan) Takuma Sato (A. J. Foyt Racing)
- Time: 41.2239 (on lap 56 of 160)

Podium
- First: (New Zealand) Scott Dixon (Chip Ganassi Racing)
- Second: (United States) Charlie Kimball (Chip Ganassi Racing)
- Third: (Scotland) Dario Franchitti (Chip Ganassi Racing)

Chronology
Previous	Next
1989	2014

The 2013 Pocono IndyCar 400 Fueled by Sunoco was the 11th round of the 2013 IndyCar Series season. The race was held on July 7, 2013, in Long Pond, Pennsylvania at Pocono Raceway. The race was contested of 160 laps. Scott Dixon won the race. Charlie Kimball finished 2nd, and Dario Franchitti finished 3rd. Will Power and Josef Newgarden rounded out the top five, and Simon Pagenaud, Justin Wilson, Hélio Castroneves, Ed Carpenter, and Marco Andretti rounded out the top ten.

== Background ==
Pocono Raceway held an IndyCar race from 1971–1989, though as a 500-mile race, with the event ending after Pocono owner Joseph Mattioli chose not to return, citing the rivalry between the USAC and CART as a factor. The final race at the track was won by Danny Sullivan.

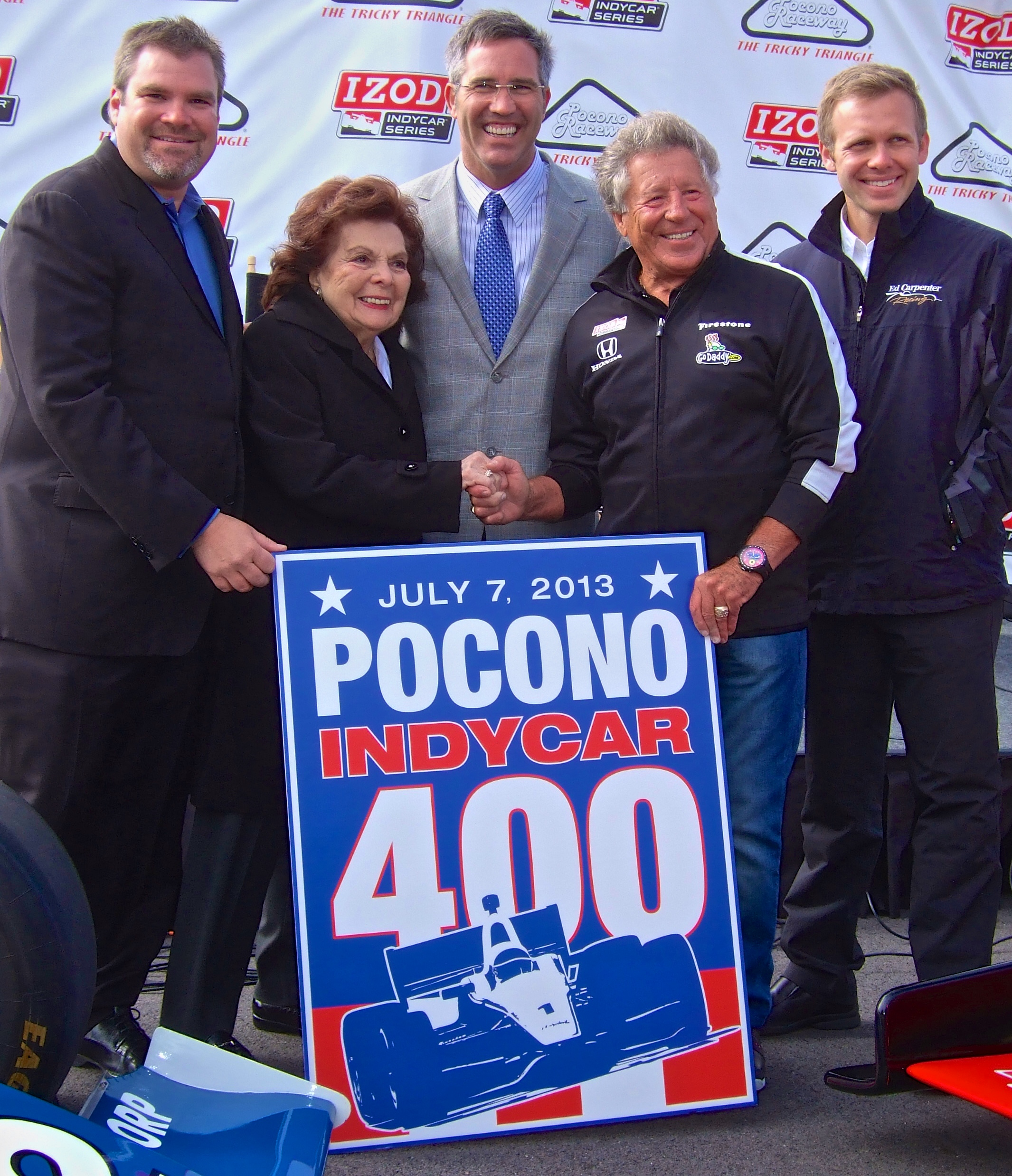
Brandon Igdalsky, Dr. Rose Mattioli, Randy Bernard, Mario Andretti, and Ed Carpenter announce IndyCar's return to Pocono

On October 1, 2012, IndyCar announced that the Pocono race will make a return for 2013. However, the race was shortened by 100 miles to 400, as a request by ABC to fit the time window. The race became a part of the IndyCar Triple Crown of Motorsport, in which if a driver wins the Indianapolis 500, the Pocono IndyCar 400, and the season-ending MAVTV 500, they will win $1 million.

The first ten races of the 2013 season were split by Andretti Autosport and other teams, with Andretti drivers James Hinchcliffe winning three races and teammate Ryan Hunter-Reay winning two. The other five races were won by Takuma Sato (A. J. Foyt Enterprises), Tony Kanaan (KV Racing Technology), Mike Conway (Dale Coyne Racing), Simon Pagenaud (Sam Schmidt Motorsports) and Hélio Castroneves (Team Penske).

== Entrants ==
Key	Meaning
R	Rookie
W	Past winner

No.	Driver	Team	Engine
1	(United States) Ryan Hunter-Reay	Team Penske	Chevrolet
3	(Brazil) Hélio Castroneves	Team Penske	Chevrolet
4	(Australia) Ryan Briscoe	Panther Racing	Chevrolet
5	(Venezuela) E. J. Viso	Team Venezuela/Andretti Autosport/HVM	Chevrolet
6	(Colombia) Sebastián Saavedra	Dragon Racing	Chevrolet
7	(France) Sébastien Bourdais	Dragon Racing	Chevrolet
9	(New Zealand) Scott Dixon	Chip Ganassi Racing	Honda
10	(United Kingdom) Dario Franchitti	Chip Ganassi Racing	Honda
11	(Brazil) Tony Kanaan	KV Racing Technology	Chevrolet
12	(Australia) Will Power	Team Penske	Chevrolet
14	(Japan) Takuma Sato	A. J. Foyt Enterprises	Honda
15	(United States) Graham Rahal	Rahal Letterman Lanigan Racing	Honda
16	(United Kingdom) James Jakes	Rahal Letterman Lanigan Racing	Honda
18	(United Kingdom) Pippa Mann	Dale Coyne Racing	Honda
19	(United Kingdom) Justin Wilson	Dale Coyne Racing	Honda
20	(United States) Ed Carpenter	Ed Carpenter Racing	Chevrolet
25	(United States) Marco Andretti	Andretti Autosport	Chevrolet
27	(Canada) James Hinchcliffe	Andretti Autosport	Chevrolet
55	(France) Tristan Vautier R	Schmidt Peterson Motorsports	Honda
67	(United States) Josef Newgarden	Sarah Fisher Hartman Racing	Honda
77	(France) Simon Pagenaud	Schmidt Hamilton Motorsports	Honda
78	(Switzerland) Simona de Silvestro	KV Racing Technology	Chevrolet
83	(United States) Charlie Kimball	Chip Ganassi Racing	Honda
98	(Canada) Alex Tagliani	Barracuda Racing	Honda

== Practice ==
Top Practice Speeds
Pos	No.	Driver	Team	Engine	Lap Time
1	25	(United States) Marco Andretti	Andretti Autosport	Chevrolet	40.5620
2	11	(Brazil) Tony Kanaan	KV Racing Technology	Chevrolet	40.7573
3	83	(United States) Charlie Kimball	Chip Ganassi Racing	Honda	40.7825
First practice results

== Qualifying ==
Marco Andretti of Andretti Autosport won the pole position after recording a lap speed of 221.273 mph (356.104 km/h), breaking the record set by Emerson Fittipaldi in 1989, who had a speed of 211.175 mph (339.853 km/h). Andretti's teammates Ryan Hunter-Reay (220.892 mph (355.491 km/h)) and James Hinchcliffe (220.431 mph (354.749 km/h)) started second and third, respectively. The last time a team swept the front row in qualifying was in the 1988 Indianapolis 500 with Penske Racing. Will Power (220.286 mph (354.516 km/h)) started fourth, while Tony Kanaan (219.625 mph (353.452 km/h)) and Hélio Castroneves (219.581 mph (353.381 km/h)) started fifth and sixth, respectively. Scott Dixon (219.500 mph (353.251 km/h), Takuma Sato (219.124 mph (352.646 km/h)), Simon Pagenaud (218.859 mph (352.219 km/h)) and Simona de Silvestro (218.590 mph (351.787 km/h)) rounded out the top ten.

Meanwhile, the fourth Andretti driver, E. J. Viso, was in position to start in fourth until he hit the wall during qualifying; Alex Tagliani had also hit the wall while qualifying. Viso and Tagliani started 22nd and 24th, respectively. For Dixon, despite qualifying in seventh, was penalized ten spots due to conflicts between manufacturer Honda and IndyCar regarding the 2,000 miles (3,200 km) engine change rule. Dixon was not the only driver penalized for unapproved engine changes; among those forced to move back were: Dario Franchitti, Pippa Mann, Justin Wilson, Viso and Tagliani.

=== Qualifying classification ===
Pos	No.	Driver	Team	Engine	Time		Final grid
Pos	No.	Driver	Team	Engine	Laps		Final grid
Pos	No.	Driver	Team	Engine	Lap 1	Lap 2	Final grid
1	25	(United States) Marco Andretti	Andretti Autosport	Chevrolet	40.6926	40.6547	1
2	1	(United States) Ryan Hunter-Reay	Team Penske	Chevrolet	40.7308	40.7569	2
3	27	(Canada) James Hinchcliffe	Andretti Autosport	Chevrolet	40.8861	40.7722	3
4	12	(Australia) Will Power	Team Penske	Chevrolet	40.7113	41.0005	4
5	11	(Brazil) Tony Kanaan	KV Racing Technology	Chevrolet	41.0099	40.9478	5
6	3	(Brazil) Hélio Castroneves	Team Penske	Chevrolet	40.9525	41.0217	6
7	9	(New Zealand) Scott Dixon	Chip Ganassi Racing	Honda	41.0182	40.9862	7
8	14	(Japan) Takuma Sato	A. J. Foyt Enterprises	Honda	41.0777	41.0676	8
9	77	(France) Simon Pagenaud	Schmidt Hamilton Motorsports	Honda	41.1539	41.0909	9
10	78	(Switzerland) Simona de Silvestro	KV Racing Technology	Chevrolet	41.1565	41.1893	10
11	55	(France) Tristan Vautier R	Schmidt Peterson Motorsports	Honda	41.1808	41.1708	11
12	7	(France) Sébastien Bourdais	Dragon Racing	Chevrolet	41.1629	41.2106	12
13	83	(United States) Charlie Kimball	Chip Ganassi Racing	Honda	41.2026	41.2357	13
14	16	(United Kingdom) James Jakes	Rahal Letterman Lanigan Racing	Honda	41.2435	41.2345	14
15	20	(United States) Ed Carpenter	Ed Carpenter Racing	Chevrolet	41.1766	41.3544	15
16	67	(United States) Josef Newgarden	Sarah Fisher Hartman Racing	Honda	41.4925	41.1399	16
17	15	(United States) Graham Rahal	Rahal Letterman Lanigan Racing	Honda	41.4483	41.3266	17
18	10	(United Kingdom) Dario Franchitti	Chip Ganassi Racing	Honda	41.5270	41.4044	18
19	18	(United Kingdom) Pippa Mann	Dale Coyne Racing	Honda	41.5280	41.4290	19
20	19	(United Kingdom) Justin Wilson	Dale Coyne Racing	Honda	41.4547	41.5434	20
21	6	(Colombia) Sebastián Saavedra	Dragon Racing	Chevrolet	41.9821	41.5176	21
22	5	(Venezuela) E. J. Viso	Team Venezuela/Andretti Autosport/HVM	Chevrolet	40.9180	—	22
23	4	(Australia) Ryan Briscoe	Panther Racing	Chevrolet	—	—	23
24	98	(Canada) Alex Tagliani	Barracuda Racing	Honda	—	—	24
Full qualifying results

== Practice (post-qualifying) ==
=== Final practice ===
Top Practice Speeds
Pos	No.	Driver	Team	Engine	Lap Time
1	25	(United States) Marco Andretti	Andretti Autosport	Chevrolet	41.0734
2	14	(Japan) Takuma Sato	A. J. Foyt Racing	Honda	41.1308
3	27	(Canada) James Hinchcliffe	Andretti Autosport	Chevrolet	41.1412
Final practice results

== Race ==
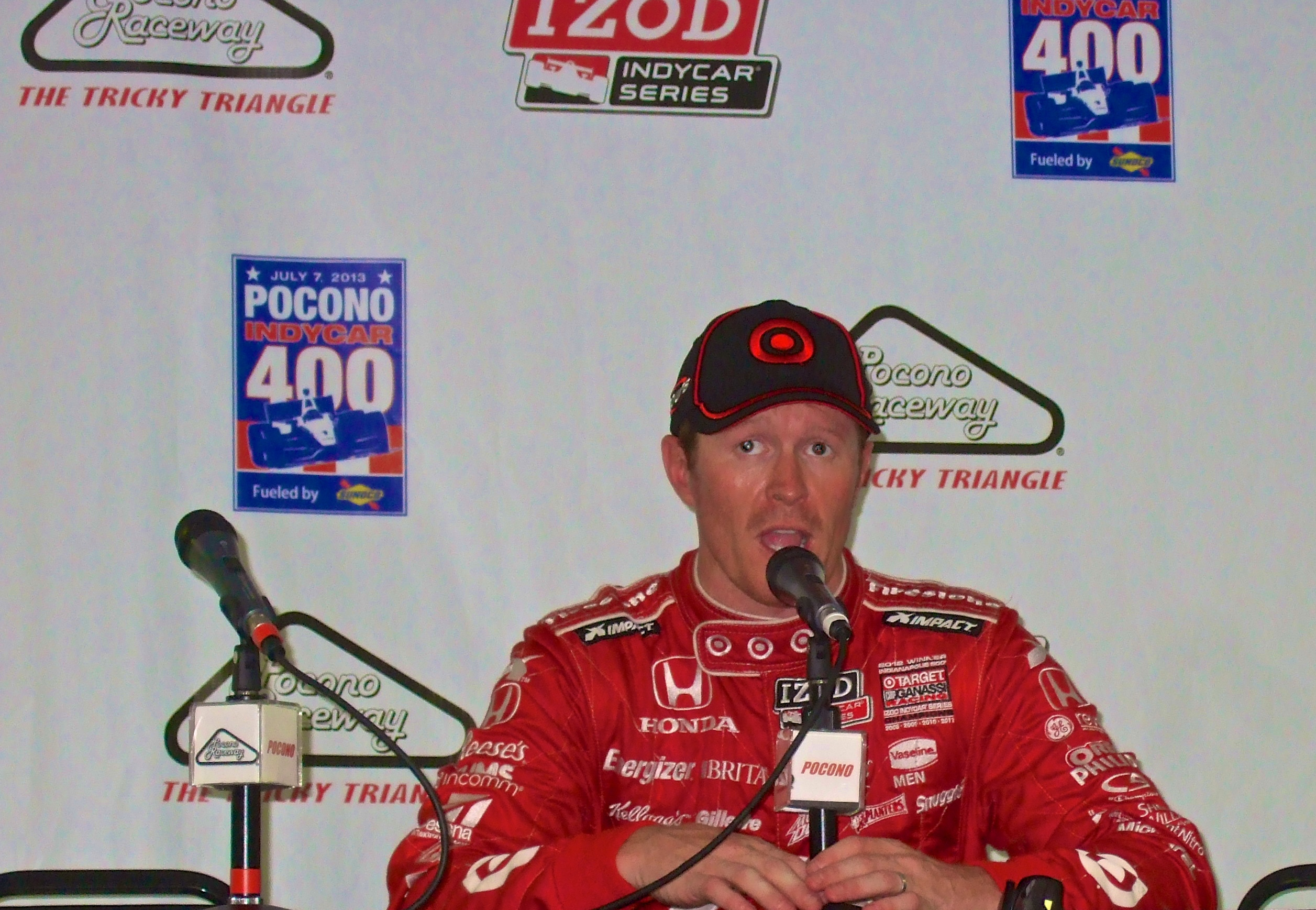
Dixon talking to the press after winning the race.

Singing the National Anthem was Christian Porter, a Pennsylvania-native and contestant on season 4 of The Voice. The command to start engines was given by Fuzzy Zoeller, winner of the 1979 Masters Tournament, whose company Fuzzy's Ultra Premium Vodka was sponsoring IndyCar's Triple Crown Award. NASCAR champion Jeff Gordon was in attendance after racing in the 2013 Coke Zero 400 at Daytona International Speedway the night before.

When the green flag was waved, the front row got into single file formation by the end of the frontstretch. After starting third, James Hinchcliffe lost control in turn one and impacted the wall with the left side of the car. Hinchcliffe was checked by the medical crew and joined the ABC broadcast booth to call the rest of the race on television.

When the race restarted, Andretti extended his lead. By leading the race and not conserving fuel, Andretti was forced to refuel earlier than other teams. He made his first pit stop on lap 29 and returned to lead when all other cars pitted by lap 35.

On lap 61, Ryan Hunter-Reay was hit from behind by Takuma Sato while entering pit lane, suffering right front wheel and right wing damage, and was forced to go to the garage. It brought out the second and final caution of the day.

Tony Kanaan took the lead by virtue of being on pit road at the moment the caution flag was displayed. He exited pit road before Andretti passed him on the race track. The lead was short-lived as Andretti passed Kanaan as soon as racing resumed. Andretti held the lead for the next 23 laps until making a green flag pit stop. During the cycle of pit stops, Kanaan passed Andretti for the lead. Scott Dixon took the lead after Kanaan pitted. Dixon entered pit road on lap 101 and returned to the track in the lead.

Indianapolis 500 winner Tony Kanaan led portions of the race, but at lap 109 he clipped his front wing passing Scott Dixon for the lead. While Kanaan was able to continue, the team was forced to change the front wing under green flag conditions, ending any chance Kanaan had at winning the second leg of the Triple Crown. Kanaan finished a disappointing 13th.

Marco Andretti, led a race high 88 laps, but was informed by his crew to begin saving fuel with 39 laps remaining. It was unclear if Andretti could make it to the finish with just one pit stop. He pitted for the final time with 33 laps remaining. He was forced to conserve fuel to make the finish but ran out of fuel as he took the checkered flag.

Scott Dixon made his final pit stop with 29 laps remaining and did not need to save fuel to reach the finish. He was followed on track by his teammates Charlie Kimball and Dario Franchitti.

Scott Dixon, who had led only one lap all season (at the Indianapolis 500), led 38 laps, including the final 28 laps, and won the race by less than half a second.

It was the 100th win for Chip Ganassi Racing, Honda's 200th win in Indy car racing, and Dixon's 30th career victory. The win was Dixon's first since 2012 at Mid-Ohio. His teammates Charlie Kimball and Dario Franchitti finished second and third, marking the first time a team swept the podium since 2011, when Team Penske had Will Power, Hélio Castroneves and Ryan Briscoe in the top three at Sonoma Raceway, and at a Triple Crown race since Bobby Unser, Rick Mears and Mario Andretti of Team Penske finished in the top three spots at Ontario Motor Speedway in the 1979 California 500. Power finished fourth, Josef Newgarden fifth, Simon Pagenaud sixth, Justin Wilson, Castroneves, Ed Carpenter, and Andretti closed out the top ten. Hunter-Reay finished 20th, and Hinchcliffe finished 24th.

=== Race classification ===
Pos	No.	Driver	Team	Engine	Laps	Time/Retired	Pit Stops	Grid	Laps Led	Pts.
1	9	(New Zealand) Scott Dixon	Chip Ganassi Racing	Honda	160	2:04:26.4178	4	17	38	51
2	83	(United States) Charlie Kimball	Chip Ganassi Racing	Honda	160	+0.4572	4	12	4	41
3	10	(United Kingdom) Dario Franchitti	Chip Ganassi Racing	Honda	160	+1.1989	4	20	0	35
4	12	(Australia) Will Power	Team Penske	Chevrolet	160	+5.6320	4	4	15	33
5	67	(United States) Josef Newgarden	Sarah Fisher Hartman Racing	Honda	160	+7.1949	5	15	0	30
6	77	(France) Simon Pagenaud	Schmidt Hamilton Motorsports	Honda	160	+9.4074	4	8	0	28
7	19	(United Kingdom) Justin Wilson	Dale Coyne Racing	Honda	160	+13.3012	4	22	0	26
8	3	(Brazil) Hélio Castroneves	Team Penske	Chevrolet	160	+13.9376	4	6	0	24
9	20	(United States) Ed Carpenter	Ed Carpenter Racing	Chevrolet	160	+15.5500	5	14	0	22
10	25	(United States) Marco Andretti	Andretti Global	Chevrolet	160	+18.4584	4	1	88	24
11	78	(Switzerland) Simona de Silvestro	KV Racing Technology	Chevrolet	160	+32.0478	5	9	0	19
12	16	(United Kingdom) James Jakes	Rahal Letterman Lanigan Racing	Honda	160	+36.2536	4	13	0	18
13	11	(Brazil) Tony Kanaan	KV Racing Technology	Chevrolet	160	+41.5507	5	5	15	18
14	4	(United States) Ryan Briscoe	Panther Racing	Chevrolet	159	+1 Lap	5	19	0	16
15	18	(United Kingdom) Pippa Mann	Dale Coyne Racing	Honda	159	+1 Lap	5	21	0	15
16	7	(France) Sébastien Bourdais	Dragon Racing	Chevrolet	159	+1 Lap	5	11	0	14
17	98	(Canada) Alex Tagliani	Barracuda Racing	Honda	158	+2 Laps	5	24	0	13
18	15	(United States) Graham Rahal	Rahal Letterman Lanigan Racing	Honda	158	+2 Laps	4	16	0	12
19	55	(France) Tristan Vautier R	Schmidt Peterson Motorsports	Honda	158	+2 Laps	6	10	0	11
20	1	(United States) Ryan Hunter-Reay	Andretti Autosport	Chevrolet	121	Handling	5	2	0	10
21	5	(Venezuela) E. J. Viso	Team Venezuela/Andretti Global/HVM	Chevrolet	104	Handling	6	23	0	9
22	14	(Japan) Takuma Sato	A. J. Foyt Racing	Honda	61	Contact	1	7	0	8
23	6	(Colombia) Sebastián Saavedra	Dragon Racing	Chevrolet	2	Mechanical	0	18	0	7
24	27	(Canada) James Hinchcliffe	Andretti Global	Chevrolet	0	Contact	0	3	0	6
Fastest lap: (Japan) Takuma Sato (A. J. Foyt Racing) – 41.2239 (lap 56)
Official race results

== Broadcasting ==
The race was broadcast by ABC with lead announcer, Marty Reid, and color commentators Scott Goodyear and Eddie Cheever Jr. Reporting from pit lane were Jamie Little and Vince Welch. After his crash on lap one, James Hinchcliffe joined the broadcast booth to call the conclusion of the race.

In the United States, ABC's broadcast had a 1.1 overnight TV rating, tied with the June 8th race at Texas for most watched race outside of the Indianapolis 500. The final rating was 0.9, with approximately 1.3 million viewers.

This would ultimately be the final IndyCar race for ESPN color commentator Marty Reid after 31 years working with ESPN. Reid would later call his final race at the NASCAR Nationwide Series 2013 Alsco 300 at Kentucky Speedway, before retiring at the end of 2013.

== Championship standings after the race ==
	Pos.	Driver	Points
Unchanged	1	(Brazil) Hélio Castroneves	356
	2	(United States) Ryan Hunter-Reay	333 (–23)
	3	(United States) Marco Andretti	301 (–55)
3	4	(New Zealand) Scott Dixon	291 (–65)
1	5	(Canada) James Hinchcliffe	272 (–84)

- Note: Only the top five positions are included.

Previous race: 2013 Iowa Corn Indy 250	IndyCar Series; 2013 season	Next race: 2013 Honda Indy Toronto
Previous race: 1989 Pocono 500	Pocono IndyCar 400	Next race: 2014 Pocono IndyCar 500
