= Pocono 500 =

Pocono 500 may refer to one of two auto races held at Pocono Raceway in Pennsylvania:

- Pocono 500 (IndyCar), an Indy car race held at Pocono Raceway from 1971 to 1989, and from 2015 to 2019
- Pocono 500, a NASCAR race held at Pocono Raceway from 1997 to 2009, using this name.
