= 1985 Van Scoy Diamond Mine 500 =

Auto race held at Pocono Raceway in 1985

Race details—
- Race 13 of 28 in the 1985 NASCAR Winston Cup Series season
- Pocono Raceway, the race track where the race was held.
- Date: June 9, 1985
- Location: Pocono International Raceway, Long Pond, Pennsylvania
- Course: Permanent racing facility
- Course length: 4.02336 km (2.5 miles)
- Distance: 200 laps, 500 mi (804.672 km)
- Weather: Warm with temperatures reaching up to 81 °F (27 °C); average wind speeds of 5.5 miles per hour (8.9 km/h)
- Average speed: 138.974 miles per hour (223.657 km/h)
- Attendance: 62,000

Pole position
Driver	Bill Elliott	Melling Racing

Most laps led
Driver	Geoff Bodine	Hendrick Motorsports
- Laps: 154

Winner
No. 9	Bill Elliott	Melling Racing

Television in the United States
- Network: ESPN
- Announcers: Bob Jenkins; Larry Nuber

Radio in the United States
- Radio: MRN
- Booth announcers: Mike Joy and Barney Hall
- Turn announcers: Turn 1: Eli Gold; Turn 2: Mark Garrow; Turn 3: Dave Sotherland

The 1985 Van Scoy Diamond Mine 500 was a NASCAR Winston Cup Series racing event that took place on June 9, 1985, at Pocono International Raceway in Long Pond, Pennsylvania.

== Background ==
Pocono Raceway is one of six superspeedways to hold NASCAR races; the others are Daytona International Speedway, Michigan International Speedway, Auto Club Speedway, Indianapolis Motor Speedway and Talladega Superspeedway. The standard track at Pocono Raceway is a three-turn superspeedway that is 2.5 miles (4.0 km) long. The track's turns are banked differently; the first is banked at 14°, the second turn at 8° and the final turn with 6°. However, each of the three straightaways are banked at 2°.

== Race report ==
Two hundred laps were completed in three hours and thirty-five minutes. There were three cautions for ten laps. Because there were no caution flags until the 177th lap, the drivers of the race were considered to be the most skilled drivers of the mid-1980s. Bill Elliott defeated Harry Gant by 0.2 seconds in front of 62000 spectators. He earned the pole position with a speed of 152.563 miles per hour (245.526 km/h) while the average speed of the race was 138.974 miles per hour (223.657 km/h).

Other notable drivers at this event were: Darrell Waltrip (currently a NASCAR on Fox announcer), Neil Bonnett, Ricky Rudd, Benny Parsons, Rusty Wallace, Richard Petty (son of Lee Petty), Kyle Petty (son of Richard Petty and the father of Adam Petty), and J.D. McDuffie. The majority of the vehicles in the field were Chevrolet automobiles. Geoff Bodine almost won the race but a late pit stop cost him the victory; he ended up in fourth place. Steve Gray would retire after this race; his lone attempt to return to NASCAR for the 1985 running of the Summer 500 (now Sunoco Red Cross Pennsylvania 500) resulted in failing to qualify.

Phil Good was the sole representative for the Dodge brand for the race; he would qualify in 39th-place but would improve his position to 30th-place. Good could not continue the race after lap 105 due to an oil leak in his vehicle.

Local jeweler Tommy Van Scoy wanted to sponsor this race to get his son into NASCAR; but it didn't work out as planned. Van Scoy's son eventually inherited the jewelry business after his father retired eight years after this race. Ronnie Thomas (who was sponsored by the local country music radio station WXTU) would finish in last place by virtue of an engine problem on the first lap of the race. He would earn $1,175 in race winnings ($3,435.2 when adjusted for inflation). Dale Earnhardt would drop out of the race on lap 3 due to an engine problem.

=== Qualifying ===
Grid	No.	Driver	Manufacturer
1	9	Bill Elliott	Ford
2	33	Harry Gant	Chevrolet
3	11	Darrell Waltrip	Chevrolet
4	3	Dale Earnhardt	Chevrolet
5	5	Geoffrey Bodine	Chevrolet
6	44	Terry Labonte	Chevrolet
7	55	Benny Parsons	Chevrolet
8	12	Neil Bonnett	Chevrolet
9	15	Ricky Rudd	Ford
10	66	Phil Parsons	Chevrolet

== Timeline ==
Section reference:

- Start of race: Bill Elliott started the race with the pole position.
- Lap 3: Dale Earnhardt's engine blew; causing him to be sidelined for the rest of the race.
- Lap 8: Geoffrey Bodine took over the lead from Bill Elliott.
- Lap 10: Rick Newsome's oil pump acted funny; bringing his race weekend to an end.
- Lap 11: Jerry Bowman noticed that his engine overheated.
- Lap 34: Darrell Waltrip took over the lead from Geoffrey Bodine.
- Lap 39: Geoffrey Bodine took over the lead from Darrell Waltrip.
- Lap 47: Eddie Bierschwale's faulty oil pump forced him into the sidelines for the day.
- Lap 67: A valve problem forced Richard Petty out of the race.
- Lap 71: Bill Scott had to leave the race due his vehicle not having a rear end anymore.
- Lap 80: Geoffrey Bodine took over the lead from Bill Elliott.
- Lap 86: Bobby Gerhart's saw his vehicle's rear end fly off.
- Lap 105: An oil leak sent Phil Good off the track for the day; Ron Bouchard had difficulties with his camshaft.
- Lap 109: Terry Labonte's engine blew during this lap.
- Lap 111: Darrell Waltrip took over the lead from Bill Elliott.
- Lap 113: Geoffrey Bodine took over the lead from Darrell Waltrip.
- Lap 147: Bill Elliott took over the lead from Darrell Waltrip.
- Lap 148: The ball joint on Dave Marcis' vehicle started acting unusually.
- Lap 150: Darrell Waltrip took over the lead from Bill Elliott.
- Lap 151: Steve Gray's engine blew; meaning that he could not race for the rest of the day.
- Lap 152: Geoffrey Bodine took over the lead from Darrell Waltrip.
- Lap 176: Cale Yarborough managed to lose a valve while he was racing.
- Lap 177: Caution flag given out for four laps due to Steve Gray developing engine problems.
- Lap 181: Bobby Wawak had a terminal crash; forcing him to leave the race.
- Lap 182: Caution flag given out for two laps due to debris.
- Lap 185: Harry Gant took over the lead from Geoffrey Bodine.
- Lap 186: Caution flag given out for three laps due to an incident involving Kyle Petty, Bobby Hillin, Jr. and Lennie Pond on turn two.
- Lap 190: Bill Elliott took over the lead from Harry Gant.
- Finish: Bill Elliott was officially declared the winner of the event.

== Standings after the race ==
Pos	Driver	Points	Differential
1	Bill Elliott	1946	0
2	Terry Labonte	1894	-52
3	Geoffrey Bodine	1865	-81
4	Darrell Waltrip	1860	-86
5	Ricky Rudd	1818	-128
6	Harry Gant	1813	-133
7	Bobby Allison	1789	-157
8	Neil Bonnett	1781	-165
9	Kyle Petty	1764	-182
10	Lake Speed	1671	-275

Preceded by 1985 Budweiser 400	NASCAR Winston Cup Series Season; 1985	Succeeded by 1985 Miller 400
