= Alpine Mountain Ski & Ride Center =

Ski area in Pennsylvania, United States

Coordinates: 41.1116°N 75.2292°W

Alpine Mountain Closed
- Interactive map of Alpine Mountain Closed
- Location: Analomink, Pennsylvania, U.S.
- Nearest city: East Stroudsburg, Pennsylvania
- Trails: 21
- Lift system: 3 chairlifts
- Terrain parks: 3
- Website: http://www.alpinemountain.com

Alpine Mountain Ski & Ride Center is a former ski area in The Poconos of Pennsylvania located south-east of Scranton, Pennsylvania. It has 21 trails including 3 greens, 12 blues and 6 diamonds. It also has a terrain park located on the east side of the mountain at the bottom of the Swivel trail. The mountain was Voted On the Snow's 2013 Best Family Ski Area in the Mid-Atlantic/Southeast Region.

In 2013, the mountain was put up for sale in a closed bid auction. It was purchased by an undisclosed buyer and the ski resort opened for the 2013–14 season on December 20, 2013.

After two years of operation under new management, the mountain closed once again in 2015. It was sold in 2017 to a family local to the community who has not yet announced their plans on what will become of the operation.
