= 1988 American Racing Series season =

The 1988 HFC American Racing Series Championship consisted of 12 races. Jon Beekhuis edged out Tommy Byrne for the championship by a mere 3 points, the closest margin in the series' 16 years. While Byrne won three races to Beekhuis' two, it was the consistent point scoring of Beekhuis that gave him the title.

== Calendar ==
Race No	Track	State	Date	Laps	Distance	Time	Speed	Winner	Pole position	Most leading laps	Fastest race lap
1	Phoenix	Arizona	April 9, 1988	78	1.6093=125.5254 km	0'45:06.145	166.987 km/h	Paul Tracy	Jeff Andretti	Paul Tracy	?
2	Milwaukee	Wisconsin	June 4, 1988	100	1.6607976=166.07976 km	0'53:21.130	186.774 km/h	Dave Simpson	Dave Simpson	Mike Snow	?
3	Portland	Oregon	June 19, 1988	40	3.0930746=123.722984 km	0'47:56.850	154.823 km/h	Tommy Byrne	Tommy Byrne	Tommy Byrne	?
4	Cleveland	Ohio	July 3, 1988	30	3.991064=119.73192 km	0'37:01.654	194.015 km/h	Juan Manuel Fangio II	Juan Manuel Fangio II	Juan Manuel Fangio II	?
5	Toronto	Canada	July 17, 1988	38	2.8709912=120.58163 km	0'45:09.290	160.224 km/h	Calvin Fish	Tommy Byrne	Tommy Byrne	?
6	Meadowlands	New Jersey	July 24, 1988	58	1.9585181=113.59405 km	0'44:47.940	152.138 km/h	Jon Beekhuis	Jon Beekhuis	Jon Beekhuis	?
7	Pocono	Pennsylvania	August 20, 1988	40	4.02325=160.93 km	0'45:45.215	211.039 km/h	Michael Greenfield	Dave Simpson	Michael Greenfield	?
8	Lexington	Ohio	September 4, 1988	32	3.86232=123.59424 km	0'45:44.820	162.101 km/h	Jon Beekhuis	Jon Beekhuis	Jon Beekhuis	?
9	Elkhart Lake	Wisconsin	September 11, 1988	19	6.4372=122.3068 km	0'40:33.206	180.957 km/h	Juan Manuel Fangio II	Calvin Fish	Juan Manuel Fangio II	?
10	Nazareth	Pennsylvania	September 25, 1988	75	1.5223978=114.179835 km	0'36:07.780	189.617 km/h	Calvin Fish	Calvin Fish	Calvin Fish	?
11	Monterey	California	October 16, 1988	32	3.5629902=114.0156864 km	0'45:32.780	150.197 km/h	Tommy Byrne	Juan Manuel Fangio II	Juan Manuel Fangio II	?
12	Miami	Florida	November 6, 1988	22	2.8709912=63.1618064 km	0'39:47.729	95.230 km/h	Tommy Byrne	Juan Manuel Fangio II	Tommy Byrne	?

Note:

Race 12 red-flagged after two laps due to an accident involving Michael Greenfield, Jeff Andretti and Guido Daccò and restarted.

== Race summaries ==
=== Phoenix race ===
Held April 9 at Phoenix International Raceway. Jeff Andretti won the pole.

Top Five Results

1. Paul Tracy
2. Calvin Fish
3. Wally Dallenbach Jr.
4. Dave Simpson
5. Ted Prappas

=== Milwaukee race ===
Held June 4 at The Milwaukee Mile. Dave Simpson won the pole.

Top Five Results

1. Dave Simpson
2. Mike Snow
3. John McCracken
4. Jon Beekhuis
5. Brian Ongais

=== Portland race ===
Held June 19 at Portland International Raceway. Tommy Byrne won the pole.

Top Five Results

1. Tommy Byrne
2. Juan Manuel Fangio II
3. Jon Beekhuis
4. Paul Tracy
5. Dave Simpson

=== Cleveland race ===
Held July 3 at Burke Lakefront Airport. Juan Manuel Fangio II won the pole.

Top Five Results

1. Juan Manuel Fangio II
2. Calvin Fish
3. Dave Simpson
4. Jon Beekhuis
5. Guido Daccò

=== Toronto race ===
Held July 17 at Exhibition Place. Tommy Byrne won the pole.

Top Five Results

1. Calvin Fish
2. Tommy Byrne
3. Guido Daccò
4. Jon Beekhuis
5. Ted Prappas

=== Meadowlands race ===
Held July 24 at the Meadowlands Sports Complex. Jon Beekhuis won the pole.

Top Five Results

1. Jon Beekhuis
2. Dave Simpson
3. Tommy Byrne
4. Ted Prappas
5. Calvin Fish

=== Pocono race ===
Held August 20 at Pocono Raceway. Dave Simpson won the pole.

Top Five Results

1. Michael Greenfield
2. Tommy Byrne
3. Dave Simpson
4. Juan Manuel Fangio II
5. Ted Prappas

=== Mid-Ohio race ===
Held September 4 at The Mid-Ohio Sports Car Course. Jon Beekhuis won the pole.

Top Five Results

1. Jon Beekhuis
2. Tommy Byrne
3. Ted Prappas
4. Gary Rubio
5. Paul Tracy

=== Elkhart Lake race ===
Held September 11 at Road America. Calvin Fish won the pole.

Top Five Results

1. Juan Manuel Fangio II
2. Jon Beekhuis
3. Ted Prappas
4. Gary Rubio
5. Mike Groff

=== Nazareth race ===
Held September 25 at Nazareth Speedway. Calvin Fish won the pole.

Top Five Results

1. Calvin Fish
2. Mike Groff
3. Mike Snow
4. Dave Simpson
5. Jon Beekhuis

=== Laguna Seca race ===
Held October 16 at Mazda Raceway Laguna Seca. Juan Manuel Fangio II won the pole.

Top Five Results

1. Tommy Byrne
2. Jon Beekhuis
3. Juan Manuel Fangio II
4. Gary Rubio
5. Mike Snow

=== Miami race ===
Held November 6 at Tamiami Park. Juan Manuel Fangio II won the pole.

Top Five Results

1. Tommy Byrne
2. Juan Manuel Fangio II
3. Calvin Fish
4. Gary Rubio
5. Jon Beekhuis

== Final points standings ==
=== Driver ===
For every race the points were awarded: 20 points to the winner, 16 for runner-up, 14 for third place, 12 for fourth place, 10 for fifth place, 8 for sixth place, 6 seventh place, winding down to 1 points for 12th place. Additional points were awarded to the pole winner (1 point) and to the driver leading the most laps (1 point).

Place	Name	Country	Team	Total points	(United States)	(United States)	(United States)	(United States)	(United States)	(Canada)	(United States)	(United States)	(United States)	(United States)	(United States)	(United States)
1	Jon Beekhuis	United States	P.I.G. Enterprises Racing	147	-	12	14	12	12	22	1	22	16	10	16	10
2	Tommy Byrne	Ireland	Opar Racing	144	-	-	22		18	14	16	16	3	6	20	21
2	Tommy Byrne	Ireland	R & K Racing	144				8
3	Dave Simpson	United States	Bill Simpson Racing	122	12	21	10	14	8	16	15	8	6	12	-	-
4	Calvin Fish	United Kingdom	Team Shierson	113	16	4	4	16	20	10	6	-	1	22	-	14
5	Juan Manuel Fangio II	Argentina	TEAMKAR International	105	-	-	16	22	-	1
5	Juan Manuel Fangio II	Argentina	Leading Edge Motorsport	105							12	-	21	-	16	17
6	Ted Prappas	United States	TEAMKAR International	103	10	8	1	5	10	12	10	14	14	3	8	8
7	Gary Rubio	United States	Performance Motorsports	83	1	6	5	3	5	6	8	12	12	1	12	12
8	Mike Snow	United States	Leading Edge Motorsport	70	6	17	-	6	4	4	2	2	5	14	10	-
9	Paul Tracy	Canada	Hemelgarn Racing	58	21	-	12	2	-	-	-	10	-	8	5	-
10	Guido Daccò	Italy	Agapiou Racing	53	8	3	8	10	14	8	-	-	-	2	-	-
11	Brian Ongais	United States	Ongais Racing	40	2	10	6	-	1	-	5	5	8	-	3	-
12	Michael Greenfield	United States	C. P. Racing	32	-	-	-	-	-	-	21	1	-	4	6	-
13	Mike Groff	United States	Agapiou Racing	26	-	-	-	-	-	-	-	-	10
13	Mike Groff	United States	Leading Edge Motorsport	26										16	-	-
	Steve Barclay	United States	R & K Racing	26	-	5	3	1	-	2	4	4	-	5	2	-
15	Wally Dallenbach Jr.	United States	Colorado Connection Racing	19	14	-	-	-	-	5	-	-	-	-	-	-
16	Giovanni Fontanesi	Venezuela	Agapiou Racing	17	4	-	-	4	6	-	-	3	-	-	-	-
17	George Metsos	Greece	R & K Racing	16	5	-	-	-	-	-	3	6	2	-	-	-
18	John McCracken	United States	JMC Racing	14	-	14	-	-	-	-	-	-	-	-	-	-
19	Brad Murphey	United States	TEAMKAR International	8	3	1	-	-	3	-	-	-	1	-	-	-
20	Daniel Campeau	Canada	Hemelgarn Racing	6	-	-	-	-	-	-	-	-	-	-	-	6
21	Jeff Andretti	United States	Hemelgarn Racing	5	1	2	2	-	-	-	-	-	-	-	-	-
	Scott Harrington	United States	R & K Racing	5	-	-	-	-	-	-	-	-	-	-	-	5
	Dave Kudrave	United States	Leading Edge Motorsport	5	-	-	-	-	-	-	-	-	-	-	1	4
24	Bobby Fix	United States	Accel Motorsports	4	-	-	-	-	-	-	-	-	4	-	-	-
	Jim Noble	United States	?	4	-	-	-	-	-	-	-	-	-	-	4	-
26	Jimmy Vasser	United States	R & K Racing	3	-	-	-	-	-	3	-	-	-	-	-	-
	Steve Shelton	United States	Leading Edge Motorsport	3	-	-	-	-	-	-	-	-	-	-	-	3
28	Marty Roth	Canada	TEAMKAR International	2	-	-	-	-	2	-	-	-	-	-	-	-
	Franco Scapini	Italy	TEAMKAR International	2	-	-	-	-	-	-	-	-	-	-	-	2
30	Sport Allen	United States	Agapiou Racing	1	-	-	-	-	-	-	-	-	-	-	-	1

== Complete Overview ==
first column of every race	10	= grid position

second column of every race	10	= race result

R16=retired, but classified

Place	Name	Country	Team	(United States)		(United States)		(United States)		(United States)		(United States)		(Canada)		(United States)		(United States)		(United States)		(United States)		(United States)		(United States)
1	Jon Beekhuis	United States	P.I.G. Enterprises Racing	4	R16	4	4	3	3	2	4	3	4	1	1	2	R12	1	1	3	2	3	5	3	2	6	5
2	Tommy Byrne	Ireland	Opar Racing	5	R17	-	-	1	1			1	2	4	3	3	2	3	2	5	10	6	7	4	1	2	1
2	Tommy Byrne	Ireland	R & K Racing							5	6
3	Dave Simpson	United States	Bill Simpson Racing	8	4	1	1	6	5	3	3	6	6	3	2	1	3	9	6	4	7	5	4	-	-	-	-
4	Calvin Fish	United Kingdom	Team Shierson	2	2	7	9	4	R9	4	2	2	1	5	5	6	7	4	R15	1	R13	1	1	2	R14	4	3
2	Juan Manuel Fangio II	Argentina	TEAMKAR International	-	-	-	-	2	2	1	1	-	-	2	R12
2	Juan Manuel Fangio II	Argentina	Leading Edge Motorsport													10	4	2	R13	2	1	-	-	1	3	1	2
6	Ted Prappas	United States	TEAMKAR International	9	5	3	4	11	R12	10	8	4	5	6	4	14	5	10	3	7	3	11	10	11	6	5	6
7	Gary Rubio	United States	Performance Motorsports	10	R12	6	7	13	8	9	10	10	8	9	7	9	6	6	4	6	4	9	R12	6	4	3	4
8	Mike Snow	United States	Leading Edge Motorsport	17	7	2	2	5	R14	7	7	11	9	10	9	5	11	5	R11	10	8	4	3	5	5	-	-
9	Paul Tracy	Canada	Hemelgarn Racing	3	1	11	R15	8	4	12	11	7	R14	13	R13	-	-	11	5	11	R14	7	6	12	8	9	R14
10	Guido Daccò	Italy	Agapiou Racing	18	6	10	10	7	6	6	5	5	3	7	6	11	R13	8	R14	-	-	10	R11	8	R13	12	R16
11	Brian Ongais	United States	Ongais Racing	13	11	9	5	9	7	13	13	12	12	11	R14	13	8	13	8	8	6	-	-	13	R10	11	R13
12	Michael Greenfield	United States	C. P. Racing	-	-	-	-	-	-	-	-	-	-	-	-	4	1	14	R12	9	R15	12	9	10	7	8	R15
13	Mike Groff	United States	Agapiou Racing	-	-	-	-	-	-	-	-	-	-	12	R15	-	-	-	-	15	5
13	Mike Groff	United States	Leading Edge Motorsport																			2	2	-	-	-	-
	Steve Barclay	United States	R & K Racing	7	R18	5	8	15	R10	11	12	-	-	15	11	7	9	16	9	-	-	8	8	14	R11	-	-
15	Wally Dallenbach Jr.	United States	Colorado Connection Racing	12	3	-	-	-	-	-	-	-	-	8	8	-	-	-	-	-	-	-	-	-	-	-	-
16	Giovanni Fontanesi	Venezuela	Agapiou Racing	16	9	15	R13	14	R13	8	9	9	7	-	-	-	-	7	R10	-	-	-	-	-	-	-	-
17	George Metsos	Greece	R & K Racing	11	8	-	-	-	-	-	-	-	-	-	-	12	10	15	7	12	11	-	-	-	-	-	-
18	John McCracken	United States	JMC Racing	-	-	12	3	-	-	-	-	-	-	-	-	-	-	-	-	-	-	-	-	-	-	-	-
19	Brad Murphey	United States	TEAMKAR International	15	10	13	12	-	-	-	-	14	10	-	-	-	-	-	-	14	R12	-	-	-	-	-	-
20	Daniel Campeau	Canada	Hemelgarn Racing	-	-	-	-	-	-	-	-	8	R13	-	-	-	-	-	-	-	-	-	-	-	-	13	7
21	Jeff Andretti	United States	Hemelgarn Racing	1	R14	8	11	10	R11	-	-	-	-	-	-											7	R17
21	Jeff Andretti	United States	Agapiou Racing													8	R14	-	-	-	-	-	-	-	-
	Scott Harrington	United States	R & K Racing	-	-	-	-	-	-	-	-	-	-	-	-	-	-	-	-	-	-	-	-	-	-	10	8
	Dave Kudrave	United States	Leading Edge Motorsport	-	-	-	-	-	-	-	-	-	-	-	-	-	-	-	-	-	-	-	-	7	R12	15	9
24	Bobby Fix	United States	Accel Motorsports	14	R13	-	-	-	-	-	-	-	-	-	-	-	-	12	R16	13	9	-	-	-	-	-	-
	Jim Noble	United States	?	-	-	-	-	-	-	-	-	-	-	-	-	-	-	-	-	-	-	-	-	9	9	16	R18
26	Jimmy Vasser	United States	R & K Racing	-	-	-	-	-	-	-	-	-	-	14	10	-	-	-	-	-	-	-	-	-	-	-	-
	Steve Shelton	United States	Leading Edge Motorsport	-	-	-	-	-	-	-	-	-	-	-	-	-	-	-	-	-	-	-	-	-	-	14	10
28	Marty Roth	Canada	TEAMKAR International	-	-	-	-	-	-	-	-	13	11	-	-	-	-	-	-	-	-	-	-	-	-	-	-
	Franco Scapini	Italy	TEAMKAR International	-	-	-	-	-	-	-	-	-	-	-	-	-	-	-	-	-	-	-	-	-	-	17	11
30	Sport Allen	United States	Agapiou Racing	-	-	-	-	-	-	-	-	-	-	-	-	-	-	-	-	-	-	-	-	-	-	18	12
-	Paul Dallenbach	United States	Colorado Connection Racing	-	-	14	14	12	R15	-	-	-	-	-	-	-	-	-	-	-	-	-	-	-	-	-	-
-	Mike Chandler	United States	Leading Edge Motorsport	6	R15	-	-	-	-	-	-	-	-	-	-	-	-	-	-	-	-	-	-	-	-	-	-
