= Michael Greenfield (racing driver) =

American racing driver

- Nationality: American
- Born: 15 April 1963 (age 63) Whitestone, New York, U.S.
- Retired: 1995

CART World Series
- Years active: 1989–1991, 1994–1995
- Teams: Greenfield Racing; Dale Coyne Racing
- Starts: 9
- Wins: 0
- Poles: 0
- Best finish: 12th in 1990

Previous series
- 1988: Indy Lights

Michael Greenfield (born 15 April 1963) is an American former owner-driver in the CART series. Born in Whitestone, New York. In 1985, his first season of SCCA Formula Atlantic racing, Greenfield finished 2nd in the SCCA National Championship Run Offs at Road Atlanta. During the years 1986 and 1987 he competed in the ECAR Formula Atlantic Championship with a total of 5 wins, finishing 3rd in points in 1987. He made 6 Indy Lights starts in 1988 with Chip Ganassi Racing with one win on his series debut at Pocono.

In 1989, with Bettenhausen Racing's 1987 Lola chassis, Greenfield attempted to qualify for the Indianapolis 500 but failed to do so, as did teammate Tony Bettenhausen. The same year at the Pocono Raceway event, Greenfield crashed heavily in practice, failing to qualify there as well. In 1990, teamed with his father Peter, they placed first in the Camel Lights division at the 24 Hours of Daytona. He also returned to the CART series that year with a 1987 Lola chassis and competed in 7 races, his career-best finish of 12th coming in at the Meadowlands race. He also ran two more races with Dale Coyne Racing and competed in the 24 Hours of Daytona in 1991, then returned in 1994 and 1995 to attempt to qualify for the Indy 500 with a 1993 Lola powered by a pushrod V8 engine designed and built by his father Peter.

In 1994, Greenfield was not able to complete rookie orientation and the team was forced to hire Johnny Parsons to drive the car, however, it never came up to speed and they did not make a qualifying attempt. In 1995, Greenfield took over driving duties but again failed to make a qualifying attempt. The team could not get up to speed due to a major reduction of turbo boost for the pushrod V-8s.

== Racing record ==
=== Complete International Formula 3000 results ===
(key) (Races in bold indicate pole position) (Races in italics indicate fastest lap)

Year	Entrant	1	2	3	4	5	6	7	8	9	10	11	DC	Points
1988	Cowman Racing	JER	VAL	PAU	SIL	MNZ; DNQ	PER	BRH	BIR	BUG	ZOL	DIJ	NC	-

=== American open–wheel racing results ===
(key)

==== Indy Lights ====
Year	Team	1	2	3	4	5	6	7	8	9	10	11	12	Rank	Points
1988	C. P. Racing	PHX	MIL	POR	CLE	TOR	MWL	POC; 1	MDO; 12	ROA; 15	NAZ; 9	LAG; 7	MIA; 15	**12th**	**32**

==== CART ====
Year	Team	1	2	3	4	5	6	7	8	9	10	11	12	13	14	15	16	17	Rank	Points	Ref
1989	Greenfield/Bettenhausen Racing	PHX	LBH	INDY; DNQ	MIL	DET	POR	CLE	MEA	TOR	MIS	POC; Wth	MDO	ROA	NAZ	LAG			NC	–	
1990	Greenfield Engineering	PHX	LBH	INDY	MIL; Wth	DET	POR	CLE; 17	MEA; 12	TOR; 21	MIS	DEN; 21	VAN	MDO; 25	ROA; 24	NAZ; 15	LAG		**33rd**	**1**	
1991	Dale Coyne Racing	SRF	LBH	PHX	INDY	MIL	DET	POR	CLE	MEA	TOR	MIS	DEN	VAN	MDO; 16	ROA; 20	NAZ	LAG	**40th**	**0**	
1994	Greenfield Racing	SRF	PHX	LBH	INDY; DNQ	MIL	DET	POR	CLE	TOR	MIS	MDO	NHM	VAN	ROA	NAZ	LAG		NC	–	
1995	Greenfield Racing	MIA	SRF	PHX	LBH	NAZ	INDY; DNQ	MIL	DET	POR	ROA	TOR	CLE	MIS	MDO	NHA	VAN	LAG	NC	–	
