= Joseph Mattioli =

American businessman (1925–2012)

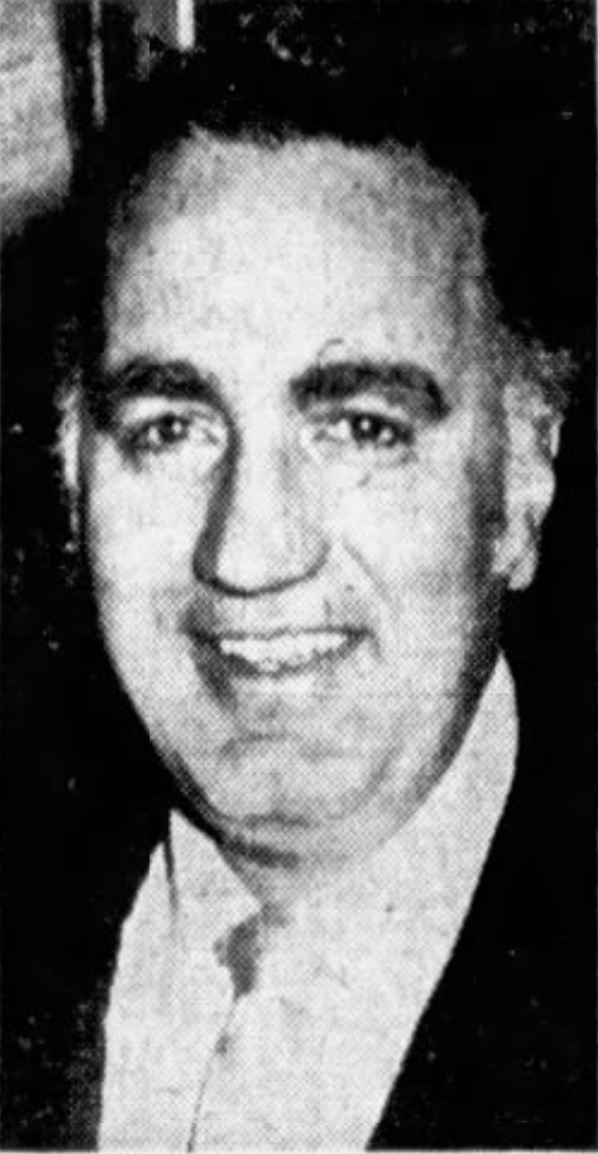
- Mattioli in 1970
- Born: Joseph Mattioli; April 14, 1925; Old Forge, Pennsylvania, U.S.
- Died: January 26, 2012 (aged 87)
- Occupation: Businessman
- Organization: Pocono Raceway
- Title: Chief Executive Officer
- Predecessor: Founder
- Spouse: Rose Nocito
- Children: 3
- Father: Joseph Mattioli

Joseph Mattioli (April 14, 1925 – January 26, 2012) was an American businessman. He is best known for founding and managing Pocono Raceway, a race track that has hosted NASCAR and Indy Car racing.

== Early life ==
Mattioli was born to Joseph and Mary (Marzzacco) Mattioli. His father, Joseph Mattioli Sr. was a lightweight boxer who fought under the name Pep O'Brien. As a teenager, Mattioli worked jobs including stonemason, ice cream man, railroad worker, and factory hand.

Mattioli served in World War II in the Pacific as a Navy and Marine medic. Mattioli was in an outfit slated for the proposed US invasion of Japan before the war ended. After the war, Mattioli used the benefits from the G.I. Bill to enroll in the dentistry program at Temple University. It was there that he met Rose Nocito, a student of the podiatry program.

Joseph and Rose Mattioli had their dentistry and podiatry offices in their family home in Philadelphia. Working up to 90 hours a week in dentistry, Mattioli amassed a net worth of a million dollars within ten years. He would reflect that October 3, 1960, was the day that he reached exhaustion and became determined to reduce his workload.

Mattioli began investing in real estate, helping to create Camelback Mountain Resort, Alpine Mountain Ski & Ride Center, and the Pocono Laurel Lake community.

== Pocono Raceway ==
Mattioli was an investor in the construction of Pocono Raceway, eventually becoming the primary investor by mid-1969. Soliciting advice from NASCAR founder Bill France Sr. and Indianapolis Motor Speedway owner Tony Hulman, Mattioli oversaw the construction of the 2.5 mile superspeedway, which opened in 1971. USAC held Indy car and stock car races beginning in 1971, NASCAR made their debut in 1974.

In 1972, the track hosted Concert 10. While 100,000 tickets were sold, over 200,000 spectators arrived. "I sat in my office with a shotgun and a German Shepherd," Mattioli later recalled. "We didn't know what the hell was going to happen. They just kept coming."

In 1979, Indy car racing split into two feuding groups of USAC and CART. Pocono Raceway had a contract to remain with USAC. The 1979 Pocono 500 was run with limited cars amidst a CART boycott of the event.

In August 1979, Mattioli filed an antitrust lawsuit against CART seeking $6.3 million in damages. The resulting boycott caused the normal crowd of near 125,000 spectators to be cut in half and caused the track to lose $2 million. With antitrust lawsuits, damages are tripled to arrive at the $6.3 million figure. In addition to CART, other defendants in the suit were Team Penske, Roger Penske, Patrick Racing, U.E. "Pat" Patrick, and Gould Inc.

The major loss of income put the race track in financial peril. In February 1980, it was announced that Pocono would be rented by the Indianapolis Motor Speedway for the entire 1980 season and all of the races would be promoted by Indianapolis. The infusion of cash was necessary to pay off creditors. Pocono personnel would continue to work at the track but additional personnel from Indianapolis would come in.

CART again boycotted the USAC-sanctioned 1981 Pocono 500. Mattioli publicly thought the boycott was CART's attempt to put Pocono out of business and gain leverage over Indianapolis. "That's the first stage, they put me out of business. The second phase would be to use me as a pawn to get Indianapolis. If they get me, Indianapolis is next. And I think they'll use me as a hostage next year for Indianapolis, and they'll want a four or five million dollar purse at Indianapolis. That's the botton line for all of this. You can see what they're doing to us here. They've hurt us for three years now. This year we'll lose half a million dollars. We had 38 entries in, but when CART threatened that 60 day suspension, 12 of them dropped out." Mattioli increased his pending lawsuit to $9 million. The suit was settled in early 1982 with the agreement that CART rent the race track and promote the IndyCar race for the following five years.

Amidst the ongoing financial troubles caused by the CART boycotts, Mattioli considered selling Pocono Raceway. Bill France Sr. met with Mattioli and convinced him to keep the track with the words of encouragement, "on the plains of hesitation lie the bleached bones of millions who when within the grasp of victory, sat and waited. And waiting died." The track added a second NASCAR race.

In 1990, Mattioli oversaw the replacement of Pocono's boilerplate walls with concrete. In 1995, the track was repaved and a new garage area, press box, and grandstands were built. Because of his warm demeanor, Mattioli was considered one of the most respected and admired men in auto racing.

In 2008, Bruton Smith made an offer of $400 million to purchase Pocono Raceway and move a date to Kentucky Speedway. Mattioli declined the sale, saying "If Bruton comes down Gasoline Alley with a wheelbarrow with a billion dollars, he wouldn't get borscht from me. I have enough money, we don't owe any money, and all three generations are working and a fourth is waiting to start. It would be like selling part of your family."

Mattioli resisted reducing the length of races at Pocono from 500 miles to 400 miles, despite several calls from drivers to do so. The reasoning was that television partners would resist losing an hour of programming due to the shortened race. He also resisted selling title sponsorship of the races, preferring they be called the Pocono 500 and Pennsylvania 500. "I don't need the money and if you don't need the money, what the hell is the sense of sponsorship? We call all the shots. All the VIPs on race day are our people, not the sponsor's people."

In 2010, Mattioli installed a 25-acre solar farm adjacent to Pocono Raceway that produce 4 million kilowatt hours per year. It was the world's largest renewable energy project at any sports stadium.

In 2011, Mattioli declared that he placed the track in a trust, insuring that it could not be sold after his death. "It has to stay in the family. I put it in trust. They can't touch it. The [SOBs] are going to run it or they're going to starve." In the summer of 2011, Mattioli retired as track CEO prior to the August 2011 Good Sam RV Insurance 500.

In December 2011, the Joseph and Rose Mattioli were awarded the prestigious Myers Brothers Award by the National Motorsports Press Association.

== Personal life ==
Joseph and Rose Mattioli were married on September 14, 1948, in Philadelphia. The couple had three children, Mary Louise, Michele, and Joseph III.

Mattioli died on January 26, 2012, at the age of 86. His wife Rose died at the age of 92 on June 29, 2020.

== Legacy ==
In 2013, Mattioli was inducted into the National Motorsports Press Association Hall of Fame.

In 2019, Mattioli was nominated for the Landmark Award at the NASCAR Hall of Fame for Outstanding Contributions to NASCAR.
