= Tommy Van Scoy =

American jewelry store owner

- Born: March 22, 1920; Bear Creek, Pennsylvania, US
- Died: June 9, 2005 (aged 85); Plains, Pennsylvania, US
- Occupation: Jewelry store owner

Tommy Van Scoy (March 22, 1920 – June 9, 2005) was the owner of a chain of diamond jewelry stores along in New England and the Mid-Atlantic States. He was also known for his odd radio commercials for his jewelry stores. He was also a championship boxer and an amateur pilot.

== Biography ==
Van Scoy was born March 22, 1920, in Bear Creek Township, Pennsylvania. His mother died when he was 8 years old. In the 1930s, his father, a former steelworker, had a difficult time finding work during the Great Depression. Young Van Scoy graduated from Coughlin High School and made money as a newspaper boy and as a shoeshiner. Van Scoy was a Golden Gloves boxer. In 1942 he joined the Army, where a coin toss led to his developing an interest in watch repair.

While I was in the army, I went to San Antonio. I was with two other officers, and we flipped a coin to see who would pay for the movie. I lost and the coin landed on the crystal of my watch and broke it." He took the watch to a repair shop, and when the jeweler learned that he was interested in the inner workings of the timepiece, he taught Van Scoy how to repair watches.

After returning home from the military in 1945, he rented a second floor retail space in Wilkes-Barre, Pennsylvania and opened his first jewelry store. Several years later he decided he could make more money selling diamonds exclusively. He often said: "I sell the same or better diamond for less!"

In the early 1980s, Van Scoy became known in New England and the Mid-Atlantic States for his halting testimonials in radio commercials for the "Van Scoy Diamond Mine." He also sponsored a NASCAR Winston Cup Series race known as the Van Scoy Diamond Mine 500 (now known as the Pocono 400). The final race of the sponsorship was in 1985 with Bill Elliott winning the race. His commercials sometimes included this jingle:

    I'm a lucky girl,
    hoo-ray, oh boy!
    Look at my diamond,
    it came from Van Scoy.
    My boyfriend bought it,
    saved lots of money too.
    Van Scoy's the diamond king,
    yes, he's the man for you!

When Van Scoy retired in 1993, he left seven jewelry stores to his children. Through franchising, Van Scoy lent his name to forty additional stores in the northeastern United States including shops in Scranton, Pennsylvania; Binghamton, New York; Hartford, Connecticut; and West Springfield, Massachusetts "When I walk into a town, I don’t have to depend on luck," Van Scoy once said. "I’ve arranged it and planned it logically. I’ll go in and sell more diamonds in one day than all the other jewelers in town have in a week."

== Personal life ==
Van Scoy had seven children with his wife Elizabeth Richards. He died on June 9, 2005 at 85 of a heart condition.
