= History of the Indiana Pacers =

Historical background of Indiana Pacers basketball team

The Indiana Pacers were founded on February 2, 1967, as an American Basketball Association franchise, and moved to the National Basketball Association in 1976. The Pacers were considered a dynasty in the ABA, winning three titles and six conference titles. The Pacers play in the Eastern Conference and Central Division, and they play their home games at Gainbridge Fieldhouse. The Pacers have enjoyed some success in the NBA, most notably during the career of Reggie Miller. The Pacers have made the NBA Playoffs 29 out of 49 years, with two trips to the NBA Finals (their most recent appearance occurring in 2025), but have never won an NBA championship.

== 1967–1976: ABA dynasty ==
In early 1967, Richard Tinkham, John DeVoe, Chuck DeVoe, Chuck Barnes, and Bob Collins pooled their resources to purchase a franchise in the proposed American Basketball Association. According to Tinkham, the nickname "Pacers" was a combination of the state's rich history with the harness racing pacers and the pace car used for the running of the Indianapolis 500. Investor Chuck Barnes was a horse racing enthusiast in addition to being business manager of Mario Andretti, A. J. Foyt and Rodger Ward. Barnes' wife, Lois, suggested the name over dinner.

Tinkham said the "Pacers" decision was an easy one, but the real debate was whether the team should be called the Indiana Pacers or the Indianapolis Pacers. Since one of the original ideas for the team was to schedule games throughout the state with its base in Indianapolis, the official team name became the Indiana Pacers on June 16, 1967.

For their first seven years, they played in the Indiana State Fairgrounds Coliseum, now called the Corteva Coliseum. In 1974, they moved to the plush new Market Square Arena in downtown Indianapolis, where they stayed for 25 years.

Early in the Pacers' second season, former Indiana Hoosiers standout Bob "Slick" Leonard became the team's head coach, replacing Larry Staverman. Leonard quickly turned the Pacers into a juggernaut. His teams were buoyed by the great play of superstars such as Jimmy Rayl, Mel Daniels, George McGinnis, Freddie Lewis, Bob Netolicky, Rick Mount and Roger Brown. On a more tragic note, team president John DeVoe died on December 14, 1968 from a heart attack at the age of 34.

The Indiana Pacers were one of only two teams (along with the Kentucky Colonels) to play for the entire duration of the ABA without relocating, changing its team name or folding. They were also the most successful team in the league's nine-year history, appearing in five ABA Finals and winning three ABA Championships over a four-year period, feats that were never bettered by any other ABA franchise.

== 1976–1987: Early NBA struggles ==
=== The "Save the Pacers" Telethon ===
The Pacers were one of four ABA teams that joined the NBA in the ABA–NBA merger in 1976. For the 1976–77 season the Pacers were joined in the merged league by the New York Nets, Denver Nuggets and San Antonio Spurs of the ABA. Financially, the Pacers were by far the weakest of the four ABA refugees. Indeed, they were on far weaker financial footing than the team acknowledged to be the last ABA team left out of the expansion, the Kentucky Colonels. The Pacers only made the cut because the Chicago Bulls owned the NBA rights to the Colonels' last remaining star, Artis Gilmore, and wouldn't have allowed the merger to go through if the Colonels had been included.

The Pacers' financial troubles dated back to their waning days in the ABA; they already begun selling off some of their star players in the last ABA season. They were further weakened by the price required to join the NBA. The league charged a $3.2 million entry fee to each former ABA team. Because the NBA would only agree to accept four ABA teams in the ABA–NBA merger, the Pacers and the three other surviving ABA teams also had to compensate the two remaining ABA franchises which were not a part of the merger. The new NBA teams also were barred from sharing in national TV revenues for four years.

As a result of the steep price, they paid to join the NBA, the Pacers were in a dire financial situation. It took a $100,000 contribution from a group of local businesses to keep the franchise going through June 1977. The team announced that unless season-ticket sales reached 8,000 by the end of July 1977, the club would be sold to someone who might take the franchise elsewhere. WTTV, which was the television flagship for Pacers' games at the time, offered to hold a 16 1/2-hour telethon to keep the team in Indiana. The "Save the Pacers" telethon began on the night of July 3, 1977, and on July 4, ten minutes before it was set to conclude, it was announced that team officials had reached the 8,000-ticket goal. In part because of the telethon, the Pacers' average attendance jumped from 7,615 during the 1976–77 season to 10,982 during the 1977–78 season.

They finished their inaugural NBA season with a record of 36–46, as Billy Knight and Don Buse were invited to represent Indiana in the NBA All-Star Game. This was one of the few highlights of the Pacers' first 13 years in the league—a time in which they had but one winning season and just two playoff appearances.

=== 1977–1980 ===
A lack of year-to-year continuity became the norm for most of the next decade, as they traded away Knight and Buse before the 1977–78 season even started. They acquired Adrian Dantley in exchange for Knight, but Dantley (who was averaging nearly 27 points per game at the time) was traded in December, while the Pacers' second-leading scorer, John Williamson, was dealt in January. In May 1979, it was announced that Sam Nassi would become the new owner of the team and retain Leonard as coach/general manager. Once described in the press as a "Corporate Mortician", the 57-year-old millionaire from Beverly Hills, California also signed a ten-year lease with the Market Square Arena and later made a partnership with Jerry Buss involving the arena.

As a result of their poor performance, the Pacers needed to resort to publicity stunts to attract fans' attention. Before the 1979 season started, they offered women's basketball star Ann Meyers a tryout contract and invited her to the team's training camp. She became the first and, to this date, only woman to try out for an NBA team, but did not make the final squad.

=== 1980–1987 ===
During this time, the Pacers came out on the short end of two of the most one-sided trades in NBA history. In 1980, they traded Alex English to the Nuggets in order to reacquire former ABA star George McGinnis. McGinnis was past his prime, and contributed very little during his two-year return. English, in contrast, went on to become one of the greatest scorers in NBA history. The next year, they traded a 1984 draft pick to the Portland Trail Blazers for center Tom Owens. Owens only played one year for the Pacers with little impact. This trade looked even more horrendous three years later. In 1983–84, the Pacers finished with the worst record in the Eastern Conference, which would have given the Pacers the second overall pick in the draft—the pick that the Blazers famously used to select Sam Bowie while Michael Jordan was still available. As a result of the Owens trade, they were left as bystanders in the midst of one of the deepest drafts in NBA history—including such future stars as Jordan, Hakeem Olajuwon, Sam Perkins, Charles Barkley, and John Stockton.

The Pacers made their first appearance in the NBA Playoffs in 1980–81, falling in the opening round to the Philadelphia 76ers in two straight games. It was the team's only playoff appearance from 1977 to 1986.

On February 8, 1982, Nassi attempted to transfer the team presidency to his minority partner Frank Mariani, but the league blocked it due to the fact that not only would it have to be subject to league approval, Mariani and his business ties with Jerry Buss of the Lakers would have to be examined closer.

With ticket sales being reported as having only sold 1,255 in the 1982–83 season with an average of 4,000 attendance for games, it was announced in April 1983 that Nassi and Mariani would not operate the club and would return the franchise to the league if they could not sell the team to a buyer. Outside groups were reported as being interested in buying and moving the team to California. Indianapolis mayor Bill Hudnut and a group of civic leaders decided to approach several local groups to try to make an offer, with just one group agreeing: Mel and Herb Simon of the Simon Property Group. The reported deal to buy the team was for $11 million (with a significant chunk involving taking in team debts) while the Indianapolis Capital Improvement Board helped to purchase the arena. On May 9, the league approved the purchase of the team by the Simons.

Clark Kellogg was drafted by the Pacers in 1982 and showed tremendous promise, finishing second in the Rookie of the Year voting, but the Pacers finished the 1982–83 season with their all-time worst record of 20–62, and won only 26 games the following season. After winning 22 games in 1984–85 and 26 games in 1985–86, Jack Ramsay replaced George Irvine as coach and led the Pacers to a 41–41 record in 1986–87 and only their second playoff appearance as an NBA team. Chuck Person, nicknamed "The Rifleman" for his renowned long-range shooting, led the team in scoring as a rookie and won NBA Rookie of the Year honors. Their first playoff win in NBA franchise history was earned in Game 3 of their first-round, best-of-five series against the Atlanta Hawks, but it was their only victory in that series, as the Hawks defeated them in four games.

== 1987–2005: Reggie Miller era ==
=== 1987–1989 ===
UCLA's Reggie Miller was drafted by the Pacers in 1987, beginning his career as a backup to John Long. Many fans at the time disagreed with Miller's selection over Indiana Hoosiers' standout Steve Alford. The Pacers missed the playoffs in 1987–88, drafted Rik Smits in the 1988 NBA draft, and suffered through a disastrous 1988–89 season in which coach Jack Ramsay stepped down following an 0–7 start. Mel Daniels and George Irvine filled in on an interim basis before Dick Versace took over the 6–23 team on the way to a 28–54 finish. In February 1989, the team did manage to make a trade that would eventually pay off, as they traded veteran center Herb Williams to the Dallas Mavericks for future NBA 6th Man-of-the Year Detlef Schrempf.

=== 1989–1990 ===
In 1989–90, the Pacers parlayed a fast start into the team's third playoff appearance. But the Pacers were swept by the Detroit Pistons, who would go on to win their second consecutive NBA Championship. Reggie Miller became the first Pacer to play in the All-Star Game since 1976 on the strength of his 24.6 points-per-game average.

=== 1990–1992 ===
In 1990–91, the Pacers returned to the playoffs with a 41–41 record, and Schrempf was named the NBA's Sixth Man of the Year. Bob Hill was head coach at this time. The Pacers had a memorable series against the highly favored Boston Celtics that they managed to extend to five games before losing Game 5, 124–121, with Larry Bird hosting one of the greatest comebacks in sports history. During that season the Pacers changed logos for the first time, and also unveiled new uniforms designed by Olympic gold medallist Florence Griffith Joyner.

The Pacers returned to the playoffs in 1992 and met the Celtics for the second year in a row. But this time, the Celtics left no doubt who was the better team, as they swept the Pacers in three straight games.

=== 1992–1993 ===
Chuck Person and point guard Micheal Williams were traded to the Minnesota Timberwolves in the offseason, and the Pacers got Pooh Richardson and Sam Mitchell in return. For the 1992–93 season, Detlef Schrempf moved from sixth man to the starter at small forward and was elected to his first All-Star game. Miller, meanwhile, became the Pacers' all-time NBA era leading scorer during this season (4th overall). The Pacers returned to the playoffs with a 41–41 record, but lost to the New York Knicks in the first round, three games to one.

=== 1993–1994 ===
Larry Brown was brought on as Pacers' coach for the 1993–94 season, and Pacers' general manager Donnie Walsh completed a highly-criticized (at the time) trade as he sent Schrempf to the Seattle SuperSonics in exchange for Derrick McKey and little known Gerald Paddio. But the Pacers, who began the season in typically average fashion, kicked it up a notch in April, winning their last eight games of the season to finish with an NBA-era franchise-high 47 wins. They stormed past Shaquille O'Neal and the Orlando Magic in a first-round sweep to earn their first NBA playoff series win, and pulled off a tremendous upset by defeating the top-seeded Atlanta Hawks in the Conference Semifinals.

It was during the 1994 Eastern Conference Finals that the Pacers—particularly Reggie Miller—finally became a household name. With the series tied 2–2 going into game 5 in New York, Miller had the first of many legendary playoff performances. With the Pacers trailing the Knicks by 15 points early in the 4th quarter, Miller scored 25 points in the 4th quarter, including five 3-point field goals. Miller also famously flashed the choke sign to Spike Lee, who had been taunting Miller from courtside, while leading the Pacers to the improbable come from behind victory. The Knicks ultimately came back to win the next two games and the series, but Reggie became an NBA superstar overnight. Miller was a tri-captain and leading scorer of the USA Basketball team that won the gold medal at the 1994 FIBA World Championship.

=== 1994–1995 ===
Mark Jackson joined the team in an offseason trade with the Los Angeles Clippers, giving the team the steady hand at the point guard position that had been lacking in recent years. The Pacers enjoyed a 52–30 campaign in 1994–95, giving them their first Central Division title and their first 50+ win season since the ABA days. The team swept the Hawks in the first round, before another meeting with the rival Knicks in the conference semifinals. Once again, it was up to Reggie Miller to provide some fireworks. This time, with the Pacers down six points with 16.4 seconds remaining in game one, Miller scored eight points in 8.9 seconds to help secure the two point victory. The Pacers ultimately dispatched the Knicks in seven games and pushed the Magic to seven games before falling in the Eastern Conference Finals.

=== 1995–1996 ===
The Pacers duplicated their 52–30 record in 1995–96, but were hurt severely by an injury to Reggie Miller's eye socket in April, from which he was not able to return until Game 5 of their first-round series against the Hawks. Reggie scored 29 points in that game, but the Hawks came away with a two-point victory to put an early end to Indiana's season. This 1995–96 team did manage to go down in history as the only team to defeat the Chicago Bulls twice that year, a Bulls team which made history with an all-time best 72–10 record.

=== 1996–1997 ===
The Pacers could not withstand several key injuries in 1996–97, nor could they handle the absence of Mark Jackson, who had been traded to the Denver Nuggets before the season (though they did re-acquire Jackson at the trading deadline). The Pacers finished 39–43 and missed the playoffs for the first time in seven years, after which coach Larry Brown stepped down.

=== 1997–1998 ===
In the 1997–98 NBA season the Pacers selected Larry Bird to coach the team, under whom they posted a new franchise record, finishing 58–24—a dramatic 19-game improvement from the previous season. Chris Mullin joined the team in the offseason and immediately became a valuable part of the Pacers lineup—and their starting small forward. Assistant coaches Rick Carlisle, in charge of the offense, and Dick Harter, who coached the defense, were key in getting the most out of the Pacers' role players such as Dale Davis, Derrick McKey and a young Antonio Davis. Reggie Miller and Rik Smits both made the All-Star team that year, and in the playoffs, the Pacers breezed past the Cleveland Cavaliers and New York Knicks before falling to the Chicago Bulls in an epic seven-game Eastern Conference Final.

=== 1998–2000 ===
In the lockout-shortened 1998–99 season, the Pacers won the Central Division with a 33–17 record and swept the Milwaukee Bucks and Philadelphia 76ers before falling to the New York Knicks in a six-game Eastern Conference Finals series. The Pacers traded popular forward Antonio Davis to the Toronto Raptors in exchange for first-round draft choice Jonathan Bender, which remains to this day a subject of controversy among Pacers fans. But in the Playoffs, after a 56–26 regular season, the Pacers survived the upset-minded Bucks in round one, handled the 76ers in the second round and finally broke through to the NBA Finals by virtue of a six-game East Finals victory over the New York Knicks.

Their first NBA Finals appearance was against the Los Angeles Lakers, who proved too much for them to handle as they ended Indiana's championship hopes in six games. However, the Pacers dealt Los Angeles their worst playoff defeat up to that time by a margin of 33 points in Game Five.

=== 2000–2001 ===
The offseason brought sweeping changes to the Pacers' lineup, as Rik Smits and coach Larry Bird retired, Chris Mullin returned to his old Golden State Warriors team, Mark Jackson signed a long-term contract with Toronto, and Dale Davis was traded to Portland for Jermaine O'Neal, who went on to average 12.9 points per game in his first year as a starter. It was a rebuilding year for the Pacers under new head coach Isiah Thomas, but the team still managed to return to the playoffs, where they lost to the top-seeded Philadelphia 76ers in four games.

=== 2001–2002 ===
In the midseason of 2001–02, the Pacers made a blockbuster trade with the Chicago Bulls that sent Jalen Rose and Travis Best to Chicago in exchange for Brad Miller, Ron Artest, Kevin Ollie and Ron Mercer. Brad Miller and Ron Artest would, in the next few years, go on to be All-Stars for the Pacers. The trade bolstered a team that had been floundering, and the Pacers managed to return to the playoffs, where they pushed the top-seeded New Jersey Nets to five games before losing Game 5 in double overtime. Jermaine O'Neal made his first of what would be several All-Star appearances this year, erasing any doubt that trading the veteran workhorse, Dale Davis, to Portland for him was a good idea.

=== 2002–2003 ===
The Pacers got off to a 13–2 start in 2002–03, but hit the wall after the All-Star break thanks in no small part to Ron Artest's multiple suspensions and family tragedies befalling Jermaine O'Neal, Jamaal Tinsley and Austin Croshere. O'Neal and Brad Miller both made the All-Star team and the Pacers made a substantial improvement as they finished 48–34, but they suffered a loss to the underdog Boston Celtics in the first round of the playoffs.

=== 2003–2004 ===
In the 2003 offseason, the Pacers managed to re-sign O'Neal for the NBA maximum and inked Reggie Miller to a modest two-year deal, but they could not afford to keep their talented center, Brad Miller. He was dealt to the Sacramento Kings in exchange for Scot Pollard, who spent much of the following year watching from the bench and backing up Jeff Foster. The Pacers also signed Larry Bird as team president, and Bird wasted little time in dismissing coach Isiah Thomas and replacing him with Rick Carlisle. The Pacers swept the Boston Celtics easily in the first round, and squeezed by a scrappy Miami Heat team in the conference semifinals. But the Detroit Pistons proved an impediment to Indiana's championship aspirations, as they defeated the Pacers in six games on their way to the NBA Championship.

The Pacers responded to Carlisle extremely well, and had a breakthrough 2003–04 season in which they finished 61–21, earning the best record in the NBA as well as a franchise record. O'Neal and Artest made the All-Star team, and Artest was named the NBA's Defensive Player of the Year.

=== 2004–2005 ===
Al Harrington, a small forward who had established himself as one of the best sixth-men in the NBA, was dealt in the offseason to the Atlanta Hawks in return for Stephen Jackson after Harrington allegedly demanded that the Pacers start him or trade him. Nevertheless, the Pacers started off the 2004–05 season in extremely strong fashion–until the infamous events of November 19, 2004.

==== Brawl at the Palace of Auburn Hills ====
Towards the end of a Pacers victory over the Detroit Pistons at The Palace of Auburn Hills, the Pacers' Ron Artest committed a hard foul against Ben Wallace. Wallace retaliated with a hard punch, and the situation escalated to a full-scale brawl, with fans and several Pacers taking part. While Artest defiantly laid atop the scorer's table, Piston fan John Green threw a cup of beer at Artest, causing him to charge into the stands. Stephen Jackson followed him into the stands while Jermaine O'Neal struck a fan who came onto the court. The game was called off with 46 seconds left on the clock and the Pacers left the floor amid a shower of beer and other beverages that rained down from the stands. Artest was suspended for the rest of the season without pay for his role in the fight.

Several of the involved players were suspended by NBA Commissioner David Stern, but the hardest hit were Artest (suspended for the remainder of the regular season and playoffs, an NBA record 73 games), Jackson (suspended for 30 games), O'Neal (25 games), Wallace (6 games) and the Pacers' Anthony Johnson (5 games) (O'Neal's suspension was later reduced to 15 games by arbitrator Roger Kaplan, a decision that was upheld by U.S. District Judge George B. Daniels). O'Neal was charged with two counts of assault and battery, while Artest, Jackson, Johnson and David Harrison were charged with one count each.

After the brawl and suspensions that followed, the Pacers fell downward into the Central Division. They went from a legitimate title contender to a team that hovered around .500 in winning percentage. The Pistons eventually became the Central Division champions. Despite the difficulties with the suspensions and injuries, the Pacers earned a sixth seed in the playoffs with a record of 44–38. An important reason for their strong finish was the re-acquisition of Dale Davis, who had been released by New Orleans after being traded there by Golden State. He played the final 25 games of the regular season and every playoff game, contributing a strong presence at center. And Davis' signing coincided with an injury to Jermaine O'Neal that would knock him out for virtually the remainder of the regular season—indeed, O'Neal's first missed game due to his injury was Davis' first game back with the Pacers.

So despite the adversity they had gone through, the Pacers made the playoffs for the 13th time in 14 years. In the first round, Indiana defeated the Atlantic Division champion Boston Celtics in seven games, winning Game 7 in Boston by the decisive margin of 97–70.

The Pacers then advanced to the second-round against the Detroit Pistons, in a rematch of the previous year's Eastern Conference Finals. The series featured games back at The Palace of Auburn Hills, the scene of the brawl that many assumed at the time had effectively ended the Pacers' season. After losing Game 1, the Pacers won the next two games to take a 2–1 lead. However, the Pacers could not repeat their victories against the Pistons and lost the next 3 games, losing the series 4–2.

The final game (Game 6) was on May 19, 2005; Reggie Miller, in his final NBA game, scored 27 points and received a huge standing ovation from the crowd. Despite Miller's effort, the Pacers lost, sending Miller into retirement without an NBA Championship in his 18-year career, all with the Pacers. Miller had his #31 jersey retired by the Pacers on March 30, 2006, when the Pacers played the Phoenix Suns.

The Pacers made a major move for the 2005–06 season by signing Šarūnas Jasikevičius, the floor leader of two-time defending Euroleague champions Maccabi Tel Aviv.

== 2005–2010: Decline ==
=== 2005–2006 ===
In 2005, the Pacers got off to an average start. On December 10, 2005, Ron Artest told a reporter for the Indianapolis Star that he wanted to be traded, saying "the team would be better off without me". Various Pacers, including Jermaine O'Neal, soon denounced him, as O'Neal did not want to talk about it. On December 12, the Pacers placed Artest on their inactive list and began seeking a trade for the troubled star. On December 16, the NBA fined Ron Artest $10,000 for publicly demanding a trade, which is similar to "degrading the league".

After that, the team had gone on a 9–12 tailspin and was 22–22, a far cry from the beginning where people mentioned that the Pacers would be one of the NBA's elite. On January 24, 2006, it was said that Artest would be traded to the Sacramento Kings for Peja Stojaković, when the trade was declined suddenly. The following day, however, the trade was accepted, and Indiana finally cut ties with the troubled All-Star. On February 1, 2006, they managed to beat the Kobe Bryant-led Lakers, keeping the high-scorer below his average. Jermaine O'Neal was also sidelined with a torn left groin and missed two months. The Pacers finished the season 41–41.

Despite the Artest saga and many key injuries the Pacers made the playoffs for the 14th time in 15 years. They also were the only road team to win Game 1 of a first-round playoff series. However, New Jersey won game 2 to tie the series at 1–1 heading back to Indiana. In game 3 Jermaine O'Neal scored 37 points as the Pacers regained a 2–1 series lead. The Nets, however, won games four and five to take a 3–2 series lead. In Game 6 Anthony Johnson scored 40 points but the Pacers' season came to an end as the Nets won 96–90.

=== 2006–2007 ===
The 2006 offseason saw big changes to the Pacers roster. They drafted Shawne Williams and James White. Additionally on July 1, 2006, they completed a sign-and-trade with starting small forward Peja Stojaković to the New Orleans Hornets for a $100 million (sic) trade exception. The trade raised questions around the league, as Stojakovic was a free agent and did not need to be traded for. Some believe the Hornets made the trade so the Pacers could use the exception to re-acquire Al Harrington in a sign-and-trade, keeping the top free agent away from the Western Conference. On August 22 the Pacers completed the trade for Harrington and John Edwards in exchange for a future first round pick.

In July, forward Austin Croshere was traded to the Dallas Mavericks for guard/forward Marquis Daniels. The Pacers also made another trade with the Mavericks acquiring Darrell Armstrong, Rawle Marshall, and Josh Powell in exchange for Anthony Johnson. The team lost Fred Jones and Scot Pollard via free agency, to the Toronto Raptors and the Cleveland Cavaliers, respectively. Another move saw the Pacers sign Euroleague Player Maceo Baston, who previously teamed with former Pacer Šarūnas Jasikevičius on Israeli's premier team, Maccabi Tel Aviv.

However, the "restoration project" took a major image hit when player Stephen Jackson and some teammates decided to visit a strip club on October 6, 2006. Upon leaving the club, Jackson was involved in an argument during which he was hit by a car. In response, Stephen pulled a gun out and fired off a warning shot. The Pacers finished the 2006–07 season as one of the worst seasons in team history. For the Pacers, who finished with a 35–47 records, nearly everything that could have gone wrong did. The turning point of the season would be the 11-game losing streak that started around the all-star break. Injuries to Jermaine O'Neal and Marquis Daniels, a lack of a solid backup point guard, the blockbuster trade midway through the season that interrupted the team chemistry, poor defensive efforts, and being the NBA's worst offensive team were the main reasons leading to the team's struggles. The April 15 loss to New Jersey Nets knocked the Pacers out of the playoffs for the first time since the 1996–1997 season.

On January 17, 2007, the Indiana Pacers traded Al Harrington, Stephen Jackson, Šarūnas Jasikevičius, and Josh Powell to the Golden State Warriors for forward Troy Murphy, forward/guard Mike Dunleavy Jr., forward Ike Diogu, and guard Keith McLeod.

On April 25, 2007, the Indiana Pacers announced the firing of coach Rick Carlisle, with the Pacers' first losing record in ten seasons being the main reason for the coach's dismissal. Pacers President Larry Bird noted that Carlisle had the opportunity to return to the Pacers franchise in another role. Later, Carlisle opted to leave and took a broadcasting job with ESPN before returning to coach the Dallas Mavericks in 2008. On May 31, 2007, Jim O'Brien was named the head coach of the Indiana Pacers. O'Brien made it clear that he intended to take the Pacers back to the playoffs in the 2007–08 season. He also made it known that he favors a more up-tempo, fast-paced style as opposed to Carlisle's slower, more meticulous style of coaching.

=== 2007–2008 ===
Despite missing the playoffs in back-to-back seasons for the first time since the 80's, the 2007–08 season displayed many signs of growth in the team, especially towards the end of the season. Off-court legal distraction from Jamaal Tinsley, Marquis Daniels, and Shawne Williams in the middle of the season did not help the Pacers struggles, and injuries to Tinsley and Jermaine O'Neal damaged the Pacers' already weak defense and left almost all point guard duties to recently acquired Travis Diener, who saw minimal minutes on his previous NBA teams. Despite this, and a 36–46 record, the Pacers had a very strong finish to the season, which included a desperate attempt to steal the 8th seed from the Atlanta Hawks, and dramatic improvement in forwards Danny Granger and Mike Dunleavy Jr. Both Granger and Dunleavy were involved in the voting for Most Improved Player, with Dunleavy finishing in the top 10. The two were also the first Pacer pair to score 1500 points each in a single season since Reggie Miller and Detlef Schrempf did it in the early 90s.

In April of the 2007–08 Season, Donnie Walsh, Pacers Sports & Entertainment CEO & President, left the Indiana Pacers to join the New York Knicks. All of Walsh's basketball-related duties were given to Pacers' President of Basketball Operations Larry Bird. Walsh's business-related roles were given to co-owner Herbert Simon and Jim Morris, who was promoted to President of Pacers Sports & Entertainment.

=== 2008–2009 ===
On July 9, 2008, the Pacers traded Jermaine O'Neal and the rights to Nathan Jawai to the Toronto Raptors for T. J. Ford, Rasho Nesterovic, Maceo Baston, and the rights to Roy Hibbert. On the same day the Pacers acquired Jarrett Jack, Josh McRoberts, and the rights to Brandon Rush from the Portland Trail Blazers in return for Ike Diogu and the rights to Jerryd Bayless. On October 10, 2008, the Pacers traded Shawne Williams to the Dallas Mavericks for Eddie Jones and two future second-round draft picks.

=== 2009–2010 ===
In the 2009 NBA draft, the Pacers drafted F Tyler Hansbrough out of the University of North Carolina and G A.J. Price from the University of Connecticut. The Pacers also signed veterans in G Dahntay Jones to a four-year deal, F Solomon Jones to a two-year deal, and PG Earl Watson to a one-year deal. Each of those players were brought in because of their defensive abilities, something that the Pacers have lacked in past seasons. They were 5th-worst in the NBA during the 2008–09 season in points allowed. The Pacers also completed the buyout of troubled PG Jamaal Tinsley. The Toronto Raptors signed former Pacers Jarrett Jack and Rasho Nesterovic.

On September 16, 2009, co-owner Melvin Simon died at the age of 82. In his honor, the Pacers wore "Mel" patches for the 2009–10 season.

During the 2009–2010 season, Pacers F Tyler Hansbrough suffered a season-ending ear injury and without C Jeff Foster, the Pacers again fell into another season under .500 and missed the playoffs for 4 years in a row. Despite another disappointing season, the Pacers managed to sweep the waning Detroit Pistons for the first time in 5 years, and the abysmal New Jersey Nets for the first time in 20. The team showed signs of life near the end of the season, winning nearly all of their last 14 games.

== 2010–2020: Paul George and beyond ==
=== 2010 offseason ===
In May 2010, after completing his rookie season, guard A. J. Price suffered a knee injury during a charity pick-up game that would require surgery. His expected rehabilitation was to last between 4–6 months, to be back just in time for training camp.

The 2010 NBA Draft brought in five new faces for the Pacers. Guard Paul George out of the Fresno State University in the first round and guard Lance Stephenson from the University of Cincinnati in the second round. The Pacers also selected forward Ryan Reid from the Florida State University. The draft rights to Reid were traded on draft night to the Oklahoma City Thunder in exchange to the rights to forward/center Magnum Rolle from Louisiana Tech. The Pacers signed Paul George to his rookie contract on July 1, 2010. Lance Stephenson signed a multi-year contract with the team on July 22. 2010. Just before training camp, Rolle was signed, along with big man Lance Allred.

On August 11, 2010, the Pacers acquired guard Darren Collison and swingman James Posey from the New Orleans Hornets in a four-team, five-player deal. Troy Murphy was dealt to the New Jersey Nets within that trade. The gain of Collison has been a sign that the Pacers' starting point guard dilemma has been solved for many years to come.

Off-the-court issues involving rookie Lance Stephenson (allegations of pushing his current girlfriend down a flight of stairs after an argument.) and current Pacers guard Brandon Rush (Suspended for five games by failing NBA drug policy for testing positive for marijuana for the third time) put a damper on the effects of the four-team trade earlier in the summer.

=== 2010–2011 ===
Adding to the already young core of Danny Granger and Roy Hibbert, the newly acquired Darren Collison added what will hopefully be the team's first stable point guard since Mark Jackson from the early 2000s. In the 2010–2011 season, the team went 2–3 in the first five games. On November 9 in a home game against Denver, the team scored 54 points in the 3rd quarter alone, shooting 20–21 in the process, on the way to a 144–113 rout of the Nuggets. Led by Mike Dunleavy's 24 points in the period, the team set a franchise record for most points in a quarter and was only four points short of the all-time NBA record for points in a quarter (58) set in the 1970s.

=== 2012–2013 ===
The Pacers, led by Paul George, almost beat the Miami Heat during the conference finals, losing by one game. Key contributors during the series included George, Roy Hibbert, and David West.

=== 2013–2014: The rise of an MVP candidate ===
The Pacers finished the 2013–14 NBA season with the best record in the Eastern Conference. Forward Paul George led the team, averaging 21.7 points, 6.8 rebounds, and 3.5 assists, to go along with 1.9 steals per game. He played in 80 of the team's 82 games. This was his first season averaging over 20 points per game.

=== 2014–2015: Georgeless ===
Prior to the commencement of the 2014–15 NBA season, Pacers' star guard Paul George suffered a severe leg-break, which severely dented their title aspirations. The Pacers finished 9th in the Eastern Conference missing out on the playoffs for the first time in 4 seasons.

=== 2015–2016: The return of Paul George ===
A fully fit Paul George spearheaded Indiana's run to the 7th seed in the Eastern Conference. Acquisitions Monta Ellis as well as rookie Myles Turner were impressive in their inaugural seasons for the Pacers. Paul George had arguably his most consistent post-season, in which he averaged 27.3 points, 7.6 rebounds and 4.3 assists per game as well as career high playoff shooting percentages in all categories. The Pacers fell in 7 against the Toronto Raptors, following the first round exit coach Frank Vogel's contract was not extended, Bird cited a possible issue of complacency as the reasoning behind his decision.

=== 2016–2021: Nate McMillan and Victor Oladipo ===
After days of speculation it was announced that Pacers' assistant coach Nate McMillan would be promoted to head coach for the 2016–17 NBA season. Before the 2017–18 NBA season, The Pacers sent Paul George to the Oklahoma City Thunder in exchange for Victor Oladipo and Domantas Sabonis The Pacers would achieve a record of 48–34 in the 2017–18 NBA season, led by Victor Oladipo's 23.1 points per game. They finished with the same record the following season, with Oladipo and Bojan Bogdanovic sharing offensive pressure. After this season, Oladipo would be traded to the Houston Rockets. Under McMillan the Pacers went 183–136 in 4 seasons, making the playoffs all 4 years. McMillan was fired on October 30, 2020, primarily due to his 3–16 playoff record with the Pacers. Former Raptors assistant Nate Bjorkgren was hired as head coach. With primarily the same roster the Pacers would have a disappointing 2020–2021 season, finishing 34–38. Bjorkgren would be fired after only one season.

== 2021–Present: Haliburton and the high flying Pacers offense ==
=== 2021: Rick Carlisle returns ===
On June 24, 2021, it was announced Rick Carlisle would return to coach the Pacers, a role he had previously held from 2003–2006. The team went 25–57 in Carlisle's first season, in a year many saw as a transition year. Midway through the season, the Pacers traded all-star Domantas Sabonis for Tyrese Haliburton and Buddy Hield.

=== 2022 ===
In the 2022 draft, the Pacers secured 6th overall pick Bennedict Mathurin, and 31st overall pick Andrew Nembhard. Nembhard finished the season with one of the team's top three assists averages. Mathurin finished the season with one of the team's top four-point averages. The Pacers showed great progress, going 23–18 to begin the year, in large part due to the great play of Haliburton and Hield, as well as rookies Bennedict Mathurin and Andrew Nembhard. The Pacers would finish the year with a 35–47 record.

=== 2023: Record setting offense ===
In the 2023 NBA Draft the Indiana Pacers selected with the 8th overall pick Jarace Walker from Houston, 26th overall pick Ben Sheppard from Belmont, 47th overall pick Mojave King from G League Ignite, and 55th overall pick Isaiah Wong from Miami. The Pacers had a strong regular season, including reaching the final of the inaugural NBA In-Season Tournament. The Pacers acquired all-star forward Pascal Siakam midway through the season, and finished the regular season with the sixth seed and a record of 47–35, a 12-win improvement from 2022. In the first round of the playoffs, they defeated the Milwaukee Bucks in six games. Despite trailing 0–2 in the second round against the Knicks, they won in seven games after a historic shooting performance in game 7, setting an NBA playoff-record 67.1% field goal percentage. However, they lost to the eventual champion Boston Celtics in a four game sweep in the Eastern Conference Finals, despite three of the four games being decided by five points or less and one game having reached overtime.

=== 2024–2025: The Pacers return to the NBA Finals ===
The Pacers got off to a slow start in 2024, beginning the year 10–15. Throughout the first 3 months of the season, the Pacers played many games without starting players Tyrese Haliburton, Aaron Nesmith, and Andrew Nembhard. From January 1 until the start of the playoffs, the Pacers had a 34–14 record, the 4th best record in the NBA during that timeframe. The Pacers would finish the regular season with a 50–32 record, which earned them the 4th seed in the Eastern Conference. This marked the 7th time the Pacers had earned 50 wins or more in a season since joining the NBA, and the first time the Pacers had passed 50 wins since the 2013–2014 season.

The Pacers faced the Milwaukee Bucks in the first round of the playoffs for the 2nd consecutive year, and beat them in 5 games, including a 17 point comeback win in the 5th and final game. In the 2nd round, the Pacers met the first-seeded Cleveland Cavaliers. The Pacers entered the series as heavy underdogs according to the media. In the 2nd game of the series, Tyrese Haliburton hit a 3-pointer as the clock ran out to give the Pacers a 2–0 lead, they would go on to win the series in 5 games, and advance to their second consecutive Eastern Conference Finals. In the Eastern Conference Finals the Pacers met the New York Knicks, and once again were considered heavy underdogs. Against the Knicks, the Pacers were able to take the first 2 games on the road, before trading wins and losses in the next 3 games. The Pacers would win in game 6 at home, to take the series and advance to the NBA Finals. This marked the second time the Pacers reached the NBA Finals, and the first time since the 2000 NBA Finals. Pascal Siakim was named Eastern Conference Finals MVP.

The Pacers met the Western Conference Champion Oklahoma City Thunder in the NBA Finals. The Pacers would win game 1 of the series by finishing the game on a 9–2 run, capped off by Tyrese Haliburton jump shot with under a second remaining. The Pacers and Thunder would trade wins and losses in the next 5 games, tying the series at 3–3, and forcing a game 7. This marked the first NBA Finals game 7 since the 2016 NBA Finals. In Game 7, Tyrese Haliburton left the game early with an achilles injury, however the Pacers still managed to hold a 48–47 lead at halftime. Early in the 4th quarter the Thunder would storm out to a 22 point lead, which they would ultimately hold onto, winning game 7 by a score of 103–91.

=== 2025–2026 ===
The Pacers would select Kam Jones and Taelon Peter in the 2nd round of the 2025 NBA Draft. During the offseason the longest tenured Pacer, Myles Turner, would sign with the rival Milwaukee Bucks. The 2025 season would mark the first Pacers season without Turner on roster since 2014.

Before the season began, it was announced Tyrese Haliburton would miss at least 6–8 months recovering from an Achilles tear suffered in game 7 of the NBA Finals. Haliburton would ultimately miss the whole season. The beginning of the season was marred by various injuries to key players, including Pascal Siakam, Aaron Nesmith, Andrew Nembhard, and Obi Toppin. Sitting with a record of 13-38 at the trade deadline, the Pacers traded for center Ivica Zubac and forward Kobe Brown. In return the Pacers traded guard Bennedict Mathurin, center Isaiah Jackson, a conditional 2026 first-round pick (which ultimately conveyed as the 5th overall pick in the 2026 draft), a 2028 second-round pick, and a 2029 first-round pick to the Clippers.

The Pacers were accused by many of tanking, or intentionally losing to improve draft positioning, the remainder of the year. On February 12, the NBA fined the Pacers $100,000 for tanking. Numerous key players would miss time to end the season including the recently acquired Ivica Zubac. The Pacers would go 6-25 in their final 31 games, and finish the season with a record of 19-63. The Pacers 19 wins were their fewest in franchise history.

=== 2026-2027: Haliburton Returns ===
The Pacers drafted Indiana native Braden Smith in the second-round of the 2026 NBA Draft. The Pacers also signed Forward Kelly Oubre Jr.
