= WinView =

WinView may refer to:

- Citrix WinView, a remote-access product based on Novell's NetWare Access Server by Citrix in the 1990s
- WinView (company), a company founded by David Lockton in 2009
