= Expo '81 (California) =

Expo '81 was a planned world's fair that would have been held in Ontario, California, near Los Angeles, in the United States, on the site of the Ontario Motor Speedway. The universal exposition, with the final proposed theme "People to People: Pathways to Understanding", would have run from May 2 to November 2, 1981. In 1976, Expo '81 was officially recognized by the Bureau International des Expositions (BIE), the international organization responsible for regulating world's fairs. However, the BIE and the U.S. government revoked their support for the fair in 1978 due to a lack of funding, leading the event to be canceled.

== Santa Clarita Valley ==
"Expo '80" was first publicly proposed by Kenneth Hahn, chairman of the Los Angeles County Board of Supervisors, and Dick Pittenger, an executive of Farmers Insurance Group, on May 16, 1974. Hahn and Pittenger, both on the board of directors of the Southern California Committee for the Olympic Games and supporters of the city's bid to host the 1980 Summer Olympics, believed that Los Angeles was capable of holding both the Olympics and a World's Fair at the same time, and that the two events would complement each other. The two men told the Board of Supervisors that they would seek a location within the county for the Expo. Meanwhile, the Olympics were awarded to Moscow over Los Angeles in October 1974.

A nonprofit group named Expo '80 was created to work alongside Hahn and Pittenger's committee on the Board of Supervisors to plan the fair. Pittenger said that the committee went to "great extremes to avoid publicity" while investigating possible sites for the Expo. In December 1974, he announced that five sites within the county had been identified as potential locations, and the first choice among the five was a 3,000-acre (1,200 ha) property at the mouth of Pico Canyon in the Santa Clarita Valley. (Note: The other sites then being considered were the Fairplex grounds in Pomona, an undeveloped area in Malibu, the Palos Verdes Peninsula, and the former site of Cheli Air Force Station in Bell.) Pittenger and the Los Angeles Times both stated that this property was owned by the RAND Corporation, while the Newhall Signal reported that it was owned by the Newhall Corporation of Beverly Hills. As a symbol of the fair, Pittenger proposed building an artificial waterfall into a nearby mountain peak. Instead of building a midway, the entertainment portion of the fair would have been provided by the nearby Magic Mountain amusement park. By the end of December, Expo '80 had placed an option on the site and began seeking the approval of various levels of government.

In January 1975, plans for the Expo were pushed back to 1981, to mark the bicentennial of the founding of Pueblo de Los Ángeles in 1781. At Hahn's request, Expo '81 received the endorsement of the County Board of Supervisors on January 16, with instructions to report back to the board on the fair's progress in July. In February and March, organized opposition to the Expo began to emerge among Santa Clarita residents, some of whom formed the Community Coalition Against Expo. Bill Welsh, president of the Expo '81 nonprofit, said that the proposal was received well at first, but when he met with local residents in February, "I thought they were going to lynch me." By April, the committee was reconsidering the Pico Canyon site because of this opposition, but continued to pursue official approval there.

To raise funds for the Expo committee, a $100-a-plate dinner was held on June 3 at The Beverly Hilton (whose owner Barron Hilton was a member of the committee), where retired general Jimmy Doolittle was named as the committee's honorary chairman. This event provoked further local opposition, as no Santa Clarita residents were invited to the dinner. A Los Angeles County Superior Court decision in an unrelated case on July 11 voided the county's 1973 master development plan, making it more difficult for the county to develop rural lands like the Pico Canyon site. The Expo committee's progress report to the County Board, scheduled for July 15, was canceled. By the end of August, a member of the committee admitted that the Pico Canyon site was only "being considered very weakly" and that a new site was to be found.

== Ontario Motor Speedway ==
On September 30, 1975, the committee approached the city of Ontario, located in San Bernardino County, with a proposal to buy the Ontario Motor Speedway and convert it into the fair site. The U.S. Department of Commerce, the federal agency responsible for regulating the country's involvement in world's fairs, had set a deadline of December 1 for cities interested in hosting an exposition to formally apply. For this reason, the committee asked the Ontario City Council to approve its plans for the speedway property quickly, but the council said it would take several weeks to consider the proposal, a delay which Welsh warned could be "disastrous". On November 13, the committee announced it had reached an agreement with the city and that it would pursue organizing an Expo on the speedway site.

Other American cities which were considering competing proposals for a world's fair at the time included Knoxville, Tennessee; New Orleans; Pittsburgh; and Kansas City, Missouri. The Department of Commerce tentatively approved the Ontario bid on December 10, 1975, with the proposed theme "Peace, Progress Through Knowledge". By January 1976, Ontario was the only city in the world with a formal application before the Bureau International des Expositions (BIE) seeking to host an exposition in 1981. Barcelona had previously been planning an Expo for 1981, but this had been canceled by the time the California proposal was submitted.

Commerce Secretary Elliot Richardson announced on April 23, 1976, that he had asked the U.S. delegate to the BIE to request the Bureau's official recognition of Expo '81, while Knoxville was encouraged to reapply for a future exposition (it ultimately did host the 1982 World's Fair). Ontario's planned theme had since been changed to "People to People: Pathways to Understanding", and the fair was scheduled to run from May 2 to November 2, 1981. Pittenger then traveled to BIE headquarters in Paris to present the committee's plans for Expo '81. On April 27, the BIE unanimously voted to tentatively set aside that six-month period exclusively for the California proposal and no other international expositions, pending final approval from the Bureau's General Assembly in November 1976.

== Federal and BIE approval ==
Under a federal statute passed in 1970, Public Law 91-269, the fair could not receive full approval from the federal government unless the Commerce Secretary determined that, among other requirements, "guaranteed financial and other support has been secured by the exposition from affected State and local governments". Expo '81 had intended to fund itself solely through private contracts, but the law required the committee to receive at least some of its money from public agencies, which proved difficult. California governor Jerry Brown said of the Expo proposal in January 1976: "It sounds like a pretty good idea, as long as we don't have to give you any state money. I'll give you a proclamation but not an appropriation."

In July and August, the Los Angeles City Council turned down two requests to lend $1 million to Expo '81, with the city administrator stating that Los Angeles "would not significantly benefit from any increase in tourism or economic activity resulting from an exposition held in Ontario." Pittenger told the Commerce Department in July that the boards of supervisors of both Los Angeles and San Bernardino counties supported the sale of $100 million in municipal bonds to fund the exposition, but when asked about this by the Los Angeles Times in October, members of both boards (including Kenneth Hahn) denied that they had ever given such support.

The Ontario City Council did not learn of the federal requirement for public financing until the week of August 30, when members of the local Chamber of Commerce were asked to personally chip in $1,000 each. Ontario mayor Paul Treadway promised that he would do the same "if I have to go out and borrow it." By late October, a total of only $20,000 in public funds had been committed to the fair project, half from the city of Ontario and half from the city of San Bernardino. The councils of other nearby cities, including Upland and Claremont, passed resolutions opposing Expo '81 altogether, out of concern that the fair would create air pollution and traffic congestion in their area.

The endorsement of President Gerald Ford was needed before the BIE could grant official recognition to Expo '81, and Ford was at the time preoccupied with his campaign in the 1976 United States presidential election, which he ultimately lost on November 2, and then with the transition to the incoming administration of Jimmy Carter. Ford took no action on the Expo endorsement before the BIE General Assembly meeting in Paris on November 17. At that session, the BIE conditionally approved the Ontario fair as an official Expo, with the one condition being that Ford or Carter still needed to endorse it.

In the last weeks of his presidency, while on Christmas vacation in Vail, Colorado, Ford issued a statement on December 20, 1976, granting the Expo the federal recognition it needed. In the statement, Ford acknowledged that "additional financial arrangements must still be made, including the planned authorization of a $35 million bond issue by the State of California." This bond issue had previously been proposed by State Senator Ruben S. Ayala. However, by the time Ford gave his endorsement, Ayala had withdrawn his proposal, saying "I don't want to get involved in the financing anymore", because he felt that Expo organizers had contradicted themselves when discussing how much public financing the fair actually needed.

== Search for financing ==
In the absence of major public financing, Expo '81 sought a private loan of $7 million from Allen & Company. Allen required that ownership of the speedway be put up as collateral, a provision which the city of Ontario opposed because it would lose its reversionary interest in the property. The city and the speedway signed a contract with Expo '81 on January 18, 1977, but the city still did not agree to the collateral provision that would allow Allen to participate. The city gave Expo '81 until March to raise the funds to purchase the speedway, a deadline which was pushed back several times.

During these negotiations, members of the Los Angeles City Council saw a draft environmental impact statement for the fair, prepared by the Commerce Department, and became concerned that the proposal would negatively affect operations at Ontario International Airport, then operated by the city-owned Los Angeles Department of Airports. On January 12, the council unanimously passed a resolution criticizing the Expo, stating it "has no relation to the needs, the potential or the heritage of Los Angeles, and is only using the name and Bicentennial date of this city for promotional purposes."

In June, Bear, Stearns and Company replaced Allen as the project's backer, offering to sell approximately $130 million of municipal bonds to fund the fair's construction if the city would issue them, and allowing the city to keep its reversionary interest in the property. The speedway was in default on its loans from Bank of America and would likely face foreclosure if the Bear Stearns bond issue was unsuccessful.

== Cancellation ==
The BIE set a deadline of May 1, 1978, three years before the Expo was to begin, for President Carter to officially invite the nations of the world to exhibit at the fair, or international recognition of Expo '81 would be revoked. Commerce Department officials hoped that these invitations could be sent in early September 1977, well before the deadline, while the final version of the fair's environmental impact report was expected to be ready in late November. The Bear Stearns-backed bonds were expected to be ready for sale no later than November 28, but the bonds did not get the backing of any local or state government before that date. On December 12, Commerce Secretary Juanita M. Kreps told the Expo '81 Corporation that she would not recommend that Carter issue the invitations, effectively canceling the fair. Another Commerce Department official said that Expo '81 could "theoretically" raise the needed funds before the May 1978 deadline, but that "they keep coming up with scheme after scheme" without success.

As the deadline approached, a new private financing arrangement was put together, in which Sonnenblick-Goldman Corporation would loan $90 million to Expo '81 and Gilbane Building Company would take over all construction on the fairgrounds, and the two firms would control a majority of seats on the Expo '81 board of directors. However, in March 1978, Bob Ellingwood, an opponent of the Expo, took office as mayor of Ontario. By this time, a majority of the Ontario City Council also opposed the fair. Ellingwood told reporters that he had said to the Commerce Department, "if you guys stick this fair on us, we're going to ask for funds from anybody we can and you guys are going to be No. 1 on the list."

On the date of the deadline, Secretary Kreps announced that she would not recommend that President Carter issue the invitations and would ask him to withdraw the federal government's endorsement of the fair, thus effectively canceling Expo '81. Days later, Bank of America foreclosed on the Ontario Motor Speedway property, which was $35 million in debt at the time, and which would be shut down in 1980 for redevelopment. Two weeks after the Expo was canceled, Los Angeles was awarded hosting duties for the 1984 Summer Olympics.
