= David Lockton =

American serial entrepreneur

David Ballard Lockton is an American serial entrepreneur. Several of his consumer-focused companies have pioneered or significantly expanded billion dollar markets, including:

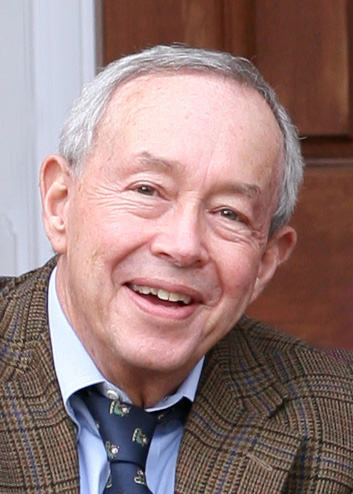
American Serial Entrepreneur

- The Ontario Motor Speedway in Los Angeles, the largest sports stadium ever constructed at one time;
- California Business, the first weekly regional business tabloid;
- Data Broadcasting, which invented the $100 billion wireless data industry with “push” or streaming, real time Wireless data services;
- Interactive Network, the first company to use a synchronized second-screen to enable television viewers to interact in real time with live sports and game shows, television commercials in real time utilizing wireless technology and smart mobile devices;
- WinView, Inc., the only platform for two-screen games of skill in the U.S. with 110 foundational patents protecting multiple business segments including live and mobile sports betting in the U.S.; and
- WinView Technology, Inc., formed in 2023 as a B2B company focused on mobile gaming, esports, daily fantasy sports and mobile, real-time applications.

== Biography ==
Lockton was born in Indianapolis, Indiana on March 28, 1937, to Richard Curtis and Violet Ballard Lockton. His father was also a serial entrepreneur. Lockton attended Broad Ripple High School, The Lawrenceville School, and Yale University. Lockton, a two time Interscholastic All American swimmer, learned the butterfly from one of the stroke's developers and demonstrated it in exhibitions two years before it became legal. Leveraging his head start, as a relay swimmer on dominant and undefeated swimming teams; he swam the butterfly on teams which held state, National Junior, Freshman, and American records.

After graduating from Yale in 1959, he attained his J.D. from the University of Virginia Law School in 1962. Two years out of law school, working for Ice Miller, a large law firm in Indianapolis, Indiana, he represented an indigent defendant in a federal criminal narcotic case (United States v Ewell) The Oyez Project at IIT Chicago-Kent College of Law and won a series of motions which were ultimately appealed to the U.S. Supreme Court. Not realizing Lockton did not meet the length of practice requirements, Justice Hugo Black appointed Lockton to represent the defendant In Forma Pauperis, making him the youngest lawyer ever so appointed to argue before the U.S. Supreme Court.

== Sports Headliners, Inc. ==
In 1965, Lockton started his own law firm and six months later formed Sports Headliners, Inc. in partnership with Chuck Barnes, former Director for Firestone. Sports Headliners became the second sport management firm in the country after Mark McCormack, (www.imgworld.com), with the big three golfers, Arnold Palmer, Gary Player and Jack Nicklaus as clients. Sports Headliners initially represented race drivers including the winners of twenty Indy 500-mile (800 km) races and six Formula One world championships. Clients included A. J. Foyt, Parnelli Jones, Mario Andretti, Al and Bobby Unser, Johnny Rutherford, Jimmy Clark and Graham Hill. Sports Headliners expanded its focus in 1968 to represent football champions, O. J. Simpson, Calvin Hill, Johnny Unitas and motorcycle daredevil, Evel Knievel.

== Ontario Motor Speedway ==
Lockton leveraged his position as the drivers representative on the Board of United States Auto Club (USAC), then the largest automobile sanctioning body in the United States, to develop in the Los Angeles area the first modern multi track super speedway. In 1967 on behalf of a small group of private equity investors which included Donaldson, Lufkin and Jenrette; Lockton optioned 14 parcels of land constituting 800 acres (3.2 km^{2}) in Ontario, California. In 1968, he raised $25 million in tax-free municipal bonds and $5 million in equity. As President and CEO he oversaw the construction of the Ontario Motor Speedway (OMS), the marketing campaign and launched the first year of racing. OMS opened on Labor Day 1970 with the Inaugural California 500 Mile Race, an Indianapolis 500-type open wheel oval track race.

Ontario was the first and only automobile racing facility designed to accommodate major races sanctioned by all of the four dominant and independent racing sanctioning bodies: USAC, for an Indy 500 open wheel oval car race (The California 500); NASCAR (National Association of Stock Car Auto Racing), for a stock car 500-mile (800 km) oval race, (The Miller 500); National Hot Rod Association (NHRA), for a drag race, (The Super Nationals); and a FIA (Federation Internationale de l'Automobile) Formula One race, (The Questor Grand Prix). Each of these races drew attendance second only to their counterparts, the Indianapolis 500, the Daytona 500, the NHRA Indy Nationals and the Watkins Glen Formula One race. It is estimated that the 800-acre (3.2 km^{2}) facility with 155,000 permanent seats and an air-conditioned private stadium club would have a replacement cost today of over $500 million. It remains the largest stadium built and one time. The 155,000 permanent seats were sold out almost 90 days before the Inaugural California 500. The race drew 178,000 in paid attendance, second only to the Indianapolis 500 and until 2004, was the largest crowd ever to attend a single day sporting event.

In addition to the award-winning marketing and PR campaign, Lockton introduced many innovations to the sport of automobile racing, including a private stadium club with annual subscription members, corporate suites, crash absorbent retaining walls and safety fences, the first Pro-Am celebrity race, and a computerized, wireless real-time timing and scoring system. In 1971, Lockton sold his interest in OMS and was honored by the Society of Automotive Engineers for his contributions to safety in Automobile Racing. He was also voted by the American Auto Racing Writers and Broadcasters Association as one of three individuals who had most contributed to the advancement of the sport.

== International Race of Champions ==
Upon leaving the Ontario Motor Speedway, Lockton created and developed the format for International Race of Champions (IROC), airing on ABC from 1973 to 2006, and the longest running made for television series that aired on ABC from 1973 to 2006. IROC was an auto racing competition. Series Champion drivers from the Indianapolis, NASCAR, F1, and road racing series were invited to race identically prepared cars set up by a single team of mechanics in an effort to make the race purely a test of driver ability.

In 1972 Lockton purchased California Business, a controlled circulation tabloid format business publication based in Los Angeles and converted it to a paid weekly. Using direct mail to acquire paid subscribers, he increased advertising revenues and brought the publication to break-even in two years. California Business was the first regional business weekly in the country. Regional business publications subsequently became a multibillion-dollar publishing segment. The publication pioneered the concept of “Annual Reports,” “Corporate Update” and “Corporate Listing” sections, in which companies paid to distribute their annual reports, ran “advertorials” and brief corporate descriptions. These features have subsequently been used by many business publications including Fortune, Barron's, and Forbes. California Business won a Gerald Loeb Award in 1972.

== Data Broadcasting (formerly Dataspeed, now IDC) ==
In 1981 Lockton moved from Los Angeles to Silicon Valley to apply his experience at California Business with subscription based financial information and at the Ontario Motor Speedway with the wireless technology behind the real-time timing and scoring system, to stock market trading information. He purchased a controlling interest in Data Broadcasting (originally Dataspeed, a company that had developed a pc version of the Ontario wireless real time scoring system) where he invented the hand held wireless QuoTrek, the first product to utilize “push” technology and wireless data, to deliver real time stock and commodity trading information to paying subscribers in a mobile environment. He successfully petitioned United States Federal Communications Commission (FCC) to deregulate and permit the use of the analog sub-carrier (FCC Docket 82-536) for the real time broadcast of digital data. He successfully negotiated with the Boards of Governors of the New York Stock Exchange, the NASDAQ, and Amex exchanges as well as the Chicago Board of Trade and Commodities Exchange Center to create a low cost “non professional” fee structure for their real time trading information, thereby pioneering a consumer market for real time stock and futures trading. The first nationwide real time wireless data network he created supported the QuoTrek and Signal services which won numerous awards. With the QuoTrek's companion invention, Signal, a wireless modem linked to a PC and Lotus 1-2-3 software to manage multiple investment accounts, the services generated over $1.3 billion in revenues over their product lives. George Guilder credited the QuoTrek in Life After Television (Norton 1992, pp 66–67) as the invention which created the communications paradigm known as “push” or “always on” data. Guilder predicted a revolution in the way time sensitive data would be delivered which is now pervasive on the Web and Cellular 3G networks. In 1984 Lockton designed and developed the prototype of a multi-purpose hand held device, the Informa, with a backlit LCD screen and alpha/numeric keyboard, designed to use the nationwide real time wireless data network of FM radio stations Lockton had assembled. In addition to user specified stocks and commodities quotes, news, weather and sports information in real time, the user could send wireless email and messages via a built in phone modem instantly received by the addressee wherever they were. The Informa concept preceded the Web by nine years, real-time wireless messaging by several years and the data capabilities of the 2G cellular networks by 10 years. In 1985 Data Broadcasting was sold to Lotus Development Corporation which never introduced the Informa.

== Interactive Network, Inc. ==
In 1987 Lockton founded Interactive Network (IN) based upon a patent received for the use of wireless push technology to control TV viewers in real-time games of skill based upon unfolding televised sports, game shows and entertainment programming. Interactive Network pioneered "two-screen television." Financed by NBC, Cablevision Systems, TCI, The Grenada Group (Great Britain), Le GroupeVideotron (Canada), United Artists, A.C. Nielsen, Gannett, Sprint and Motorola, Interactive Network developed a device similar to the Informa, the “Interactive Control Unit,” which won the International Design Award for best consumer product in 1990. IN went public on the NASDAQ exchange in 1991. The Company operated a subscription based, two-screen “play-along’ or "In-Play" entertainment service, developing over 50 games of skill to play along with live TV sports, news, and entertainment programming for prizes. IN conducted four increasingly successful test markets from 1990 to 1995 in Sacramento, the San Francisco Bay Area, Chicago and Indianapolis. The Company pioneered many of the interactive television game formats now utilized worldwide in connection with live television programming. At the time, these were variously called, “Enhanced TV,” or “Play Along TV.” IN established a Charter Interactive Advertising Consortium with P&G, Chrysler, Pepsi, American Airlines, and the Ad Council (the leader in public service announcements) to develop and test the first real time interactive and lead generating two-screen TV commercials. In addition to pioneering its entertainment service, the Company pioneered many technological firsts, including the first field-upgradable, RAM-based mobile device, the first to use the VBI (vertical blanking interval of an FM radio signal) of the NPR TV Network, to transmit digital data to wireless devices; and one of the first companies to have a consumer web site in 1996.

In August 1994 on the eve of the national roll-out of the Interactive Network service, with a NASDAQ market capitalization of $250 million, IN suspended operations and the board of directors subsequently file litigation against lead investor, TCI for conspiring to wrongfully acquire title to IN's patents and intellectual property through a financing scheme. The litigation was settled in IN's favor in April 1998. The lawsuit against TCI was the subject of a front-page feature article in the February 26, 1996 Wall Street Journal.

== AirPlay, Inc. ==
Upon the expiration in 2004 of the Lockton/Interactive Network patents, Lockton founded AirPlay, Inc., to apply the wireless "two-screen" technology developed at Data Broadcasting and Interactive Network to the cellular platform.

From 2004 to 2009, AirPlay developed for the cellular platform many of the games pioneered at Interactive Network, playable with televised baseball, basketball and football games as well as game shows such as Jeopardy, Deal or No Deal and Big Brother. Lockton served on the board of directors and consulted part-time to the company concentrating on intellectual property and special projects, including negotiations with Sony (owner of Jeopardy). AirPlay was the first and only company to utilize the cellular networks to allow TV viewers to play along with television programming and win prizes in real-time games of skill on their cell phones. AirPlay established broadcast distribution agreements with all the major carriers. The company launched Jeopardy with Sony Pictures Entertainment on 220 syndicated TV stations using patent pending technology to precisely synchronize the fast-paced game with the unfolding telecast for each separate syndicated station. In August 2009, after AirPlay failed to raise the marketing capital required to launch the service on a nationwide basis in the recession, all of the AirPlay intellectual property, including pending patents and software was acquired by WinView, Inc.

== WinView, Inc. ==
WinView, Inc. is a Silicon Valley and New York based company that provides the nation's leading live In-Play sports prediction mobile platform. The platform is focused on paid entry, mobile two-screen synchronized televised sports games of skill in the U.S. The company is leveraging its extensive experience in pioneering real-time interactive television games played on the mobile second screen, its foundational patents and unique business model. The WinView Games app is an end-to-end two-screen TV synchronization platform for both television programming and commercials. The paid entry, skill-based WinView Games app uniquely enhances TV viewing enjoyment and rewards sports fans with prizes as they answer in-game questions while competing with friends in real-time during live televised sports. These free games of skill are legal in all 50 states, and paid entry games are legal in 41 states. The company launched its Alpha test in 2015, Beta test in 2016 and Paid Entry games in 2017. As of January 2020, the company has raised $30 million to develop and market the only platform offering real time two-screen games of skill in the U.S. The company's business segments are fully protected by 76 foundational patents granted to Lockton and assigned to WinView.

== WinView Technology, Inc. (Founder, Executive Chairman) ==
In 2020, WinView, Inc. became involved in litigation led by common shareholders, including Lockton, against the board of directors, claiming breach of fiduciary duty in the sale of WinView, Inc., to a company controlled by WinView's Chairman. The litigation was settled in 2023 with ownership of the platform, and now 110 patents to a new company, WinView Technology, Inc., controlled by Lockton. WinView Technology is a B2B (business-to-business) company engaged in the monetization of its WinView Games technology, platform and patent portfolio focused on mobile gaming, esports, daily fantasy sports, and mobile and real-time applications.

OTHER COMPANIES:

== Arizona Colorado Land & Cattle Company (Amex:AZL) ==
Co-Founder, Director 1965 – 1975

AZL was the largest integrated cattle/feeding/land company in the US. Subsequently, acquired by a Canadian conglomerate. Purchased with four partners a bankrupt cattle company and grew to $120 million in sales and $8.5 million in after-tax profits in five years. It was sold to Tosco Corporation.

== Radnitz-Mattel Productions ==
Radnitz-Mattel Productions is a partnership formed by Robert Radnitz and Mattel Toys in 1970 to make feature films. Lockton introduced the parties and negotiated the partnership. The company produced eight films, including Academy Award nominated Sounder.

== Lion Country Safari ==
Lion Country Safari is a Drive-Through and Adventure Park in Irvine, CA. Founded in 1970, it claims to be the first cageless zoo in the U.S. Lockton put together the financing for the Irvine, CA park.

== Laister Sail Planes, Inc. ==
Chairman of the Board 1972 – 1975

Laister was a sailplane manufacturer using advanced techniques in epoxy-bonded metal wing construction invented by Jack Laister, whose gliders were widely used in World War II. Laister built the first and only US manufactured glider to ever win the North American Standard Class Soaring Championship.

== Patents ==
At Interactive Network, AirPlay and WinView, Lockton has been granted 100 patents. These patents issued since 2011 are considered "Foundational" to both the technical requirements to synchronize the mobile second-screen with the TV picture to monetize the entertainment content and the commercials. The patents also cover the methods of monetizing games of skill and chance, based on televised sports, including a family of patents that cover separate contests with friends and games of skill for cash, including some major elements of Daily Fantasy Leagues.
