= Ontario Motor Speedway =

Motorsport track in the United States

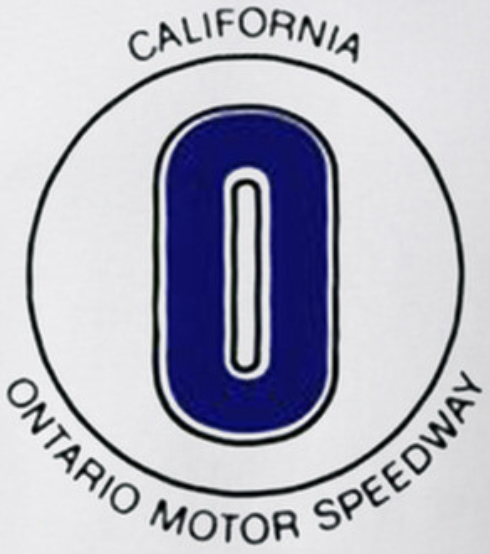

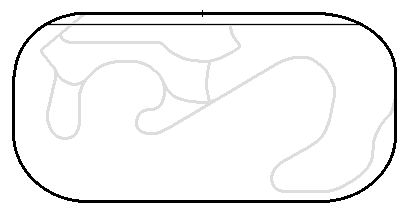
- Oval (1970–1980)

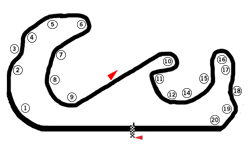
- Original Road Course (1970–1980)
- Location: 3901 East G Street; Ontario, California, United States; 91761
- Coordinates: 34°4′20″N 117°34′2″W
- Capacity: 85,000
- Owner: Ontario Motor Speedway Corporation
- Operator: Ontario Motor Speedway Corporation (1975–1980); Ontario Motor Speedway Operating Company (1973–1975); Ontario Motor Speedway, Incorporated (1970–1972)
- Broke ground: September 24, 1968; 58 years ago
- Opened: August 22, 1970; 56 years ago
- Closed: December 16, 1980; 45 years ago
- Construction cost: $30,000,000 USD
- Architect: Stolte, Inc.
- Major events: USAC / CART; California 500 (1970–1980); NHRA Drag Racing Series (1970–1980); NASCAR Cup Series; Los Angeles Times 500 (1971-1972, 1974–1980); IMSA GT Championship (1974, 1976); Formula One (exhibition; sanctioned by the SCCA); Questor Grand Prix (1971)

Oval (1970–1980)
- Length: 2.500 mi (4.023 km)
- Banking: Turns: 9°

Original Road Course (1970–1980)
- Surface: Asphalt
- Length: 3.194 mi (5.141 km)
- Turns: 20
- Race lap record: 1:42.777 ( (Mexico) Pedro Rodriguez, BRM P160, 1971, F1)

Second Road Course (1974–1976)
- Surface: Asphalt
- Length: 2.900 mi (4.667 km)
- Turns: 16
- Race lap record: 1:29.254 ( (United Kingdom) Brian Redman, Lola T332, 1974, F5000)

Ontario Motor Speedway was a motorsports complex in Ontario, California, United States. The complex featured various layouts, including a 2.500 mi (4.023 km) rectangular oval and a 3.194 mi (5.140 km) roval road course. From its opening in 1970 until its closure in 1980, the facility hosted numerous major racing events, including USAC, CART, NASCAR, IMSA GT Championship, NHRA, and exhibition Formula One events. The track since its closure has been demolished, with the track site now occupied by the Ontario Center, a mixed-use commercial center, which includes shopping centers, housing developments, hotels, a school, office space, a public park, and the Toyota Arena.

After two separate failed proposals by Sam Hanks and Filmways in the mid-1960s, Ontario Motor Speedway was built in the late 1960s and completed in 1970 with financial support from lawyer David B. Lockton and Stolte, Inc., with track leaders aiming to replicate the success of the Indianapolis Motor Speedway on the American West Coast. Ontario Motor Speedway throughout its existence had a white elephant status. From its opening, OMS faced heavy financial troubles, with its original operators suffering millions in losses and several high-level resignations. In 1973, after the original operators went bankrupt, a group led by Tony Hulman and Parnelli Jones took over operations, remaining until early 1975 when the group also faced financial troubles. The owners of the facility independently took over the track, facing $35,000,000 in debt. After the cancellation of Expo '81 in 1978, the track's owners began seeking the sale of Ontario Motor Speedway.

In October 1980, Ontario Motor Speedway was bought by the Chevron Land Company, a subsidiary of oil and gas energy company Chevron. Chevron closed the facility two months later and began the demolition of the track in 1981, which was completed the following year to construct the Ontario Center. The first development on the former track site opened in 1985, with the Ontario Center gradually expanding in the following decades.

== Description ==
=== Configurations ===
Ontario Motor Speedway (OMS) featured numerous layouts, including an oval layout and various road course layouts. The rectangular oval layout was measured at 2.500 mi (4.023 km), with 9° of banking on each of the track's four turns. OMS was made as a replica of the Indianapolis Motor Speedway located in the United States state of Indiana. The main road course layout was measured at 3.194 mi (5.140 km), with 20 turns. The road course also used parts of the oval, including the start-finish straight.

=== Amenities ===
OMS was located in Ontario, California, and served by Interstate 10. OMS was designed and built by Oakland contracting form Stolte, Inc. At the time of the track's construction, OMS featured numerous modern amenities, which included a $3,600,000 (adjusted for inflation, $29,845,758) computerized timing-and-scoring system, stadium club suites, and a restaurant. OMS had a permanent seating capacity of 85,000, with capacity being able to expand to 140,000 with temporary grandstands placed at the track's turns.

== Track history ==
=== Planning and construction ===
==== Failed Sam Hanks attempt ====
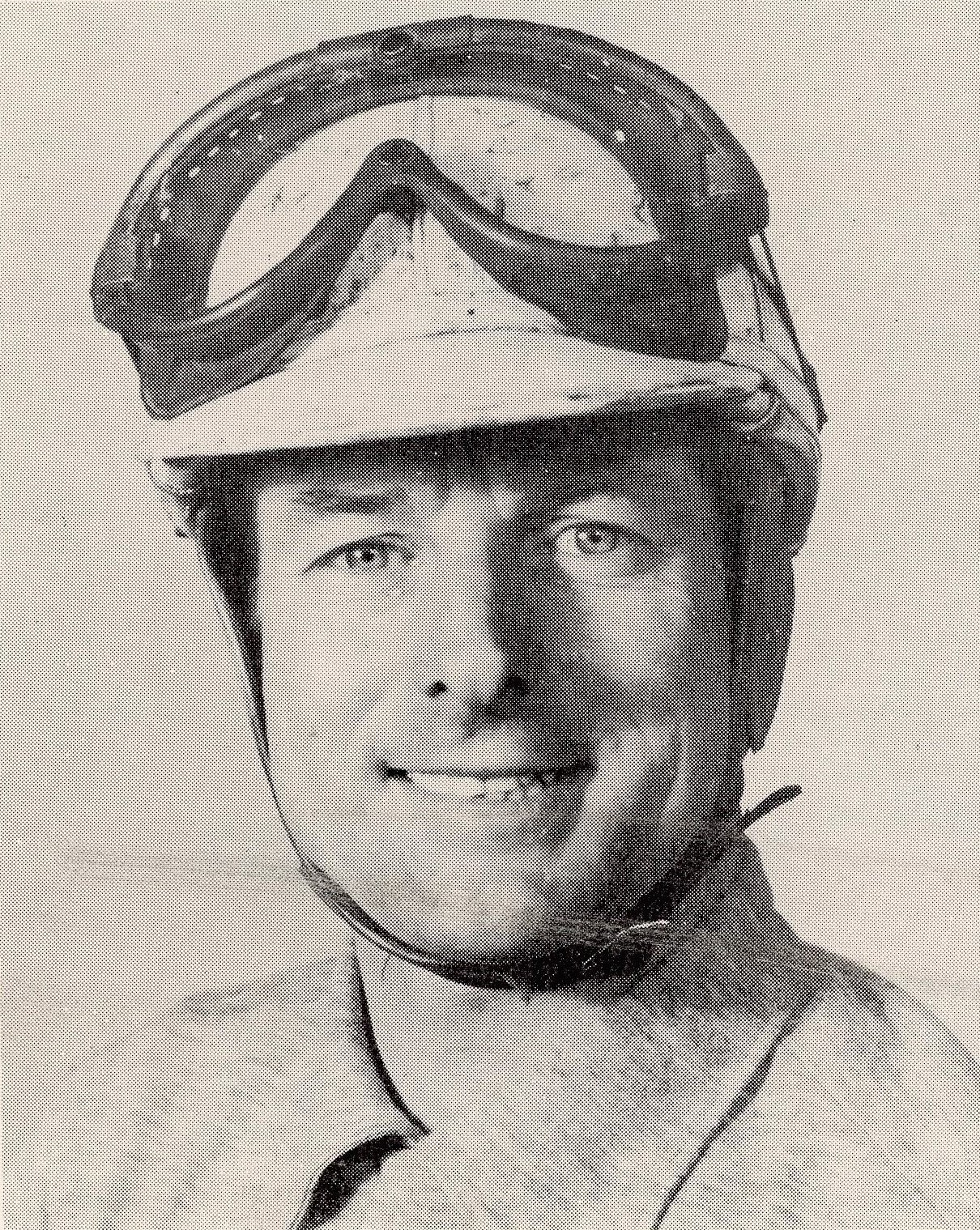
Racing driver and businessman Sam Hanks (pictured in 1957) proposed the original plans for Ontario Motor Speedway in 1963. His proposal was scrapped the following year due to a lack of financial support.

On May 27, 1963, former racing driver, 1957 Indianapolis 500 winner, and then-Indianapolis Motor Speedway (IMS) director of racing Sam Hanks announced plans to construct a $17,000,000 (adjusted for inflation, $178,777,174) track in Ontario, California, north of the San Bernardino Freeway (part of Interstate 10). The project, known as the California Motor Speedway, was planned to be a replica of the Indianapolis Motor Speedway, with plans to build a capacity of 150,000 grandstand seats and a 2.500 mi (4.023 km) rectangular oval. Numerous businessmen were involved in the venture, including oil businessman Edwin W. Pauley, who at the time co-owned nearby Riverside International Raceway (RIR). Hanks' ambitions were high for the project, with Hanks stating hopes of hosting events with higher attendance than IMS, which at the time hosted events that had attendance numbers exceeding 300,000. The following month, the city of Ontario approved annexing 60 acres (24 ha) of land to accommodate the construction of the proposed track. In August, a survey was conducted on public support of the track; according to a spokesman, the survey projected "good" results, with the start of construction scheduled for the spring of 1964. Two months later, Hanks announced further plans for the facility during a luncheon, with plans to host the first races at the proposed track during Thanksgiving weekend of 1965 and to construct a 1.900 mi (3.058 km) road course for open-wheel racing.

By early January 1964, local media reported a potential setback for the proposal after RIR officials announced plans to undergo a $9,000,000 (adjusted for inflation, $93,428,112) renovation project. Despite Hanks stating to the San Francisco Examiner that he had "enough offers to start building today" in February, he officially announced the cancellation of the project a month after due to financial support being pulled due to a lack of potential profit for investors within the first 12 years of the track's existence and high land costs. According to The Daily Report, the land used for the track would have costed "just short of $4 million". Hanks' proposal was shortly revived in December by Rayco Realty, who filed plans to the San Bernardino County Planning Commission. The plan faced heavy opposition from Ontario International Airport director Woodruff DeSilva, who stated that the track would cause disruptions to aerial traffic, which included the claim that planes would fly 30 ft (9.1 m) above the track. After two separate delays in the hearing date of the proposed plans, the project was withdrawn from the Planning Commission on January 28, 1965.

==== Failed Filmways–Stolte, Inc. attempt ====
Sometime in 1965, William Loorz, chief executive officer of Oakland contracting firm Stolte, Inc., spent $1,000,000 to buy land options to build a potential IMS replica similar to Hanks' proposal. On February 15, 1966, plans for an IMS replica similar to Hanks' proposal were unveiled to the Ontario City Council. The track proposal, named the Ontario Motor Speedway (OMS), was a collaboration between filming production company Filmways and Stolte, Inc, with a proposed budget of $20,800,000 (adjusted for inflation, $206,400,000). Plans for the track included a 2.500 mi (4.023 km) rectangular oval, a 3.194 mi (5.140 km) road course, a 0.250 mi (0.402 km) dragstrip, seating capacity for 250,000, an opening date of December 1, 1968, and four major races per year. Further plans relating to financing were announced a day later at an official unveiling announcement at the Beverly Wilshire Hotel, which included plans to form a non-profit corporation created by the Californian government to own the site, with construction being financed by a bond issue. The lessee created by the financiers, Ontario Motor Speedway, Incorporated, signed a 50-year lease to operate the track. The non-profit corporation, the Ontario Motor Speedway Corporation, planned to own the track for 30 years before ownership was transferred to the city of Ontario. OMS received support from then-Mayor of Ontario Charles Latimer, who described the project as "a tremendous economic boon to Ontario". At the time of OMS' announcement, some local media reporters feared a potential financial struggle with RIR due to the close proximity of the two tracks.

After the track's approval was delayed by the city of Ontario's financial committee on March 1 to order OMS officials to compile more comprehensive financial information to prove the track's feasibility, OMS was approved on the 15th, with OMS officials stating hopes to secure at least $25,000,000 in bonds. In later interviews, Ontario City Attorney Samuel Crowe, who at the time of the approval was a city councilman, stated that "it would have been political suicide at the time not to accept it". Two weeks later, the Ontario City Council approved to seek out potential bond underwriters. After final approval to underwrite was delayed on the next meeting on April 19 due to incomplete legal documents, approval was given to underwrite $30 million worth of bonds on May 3. Three weeks later, the city of Ontario was approved by the Local Agency Formation Commission to annex 2 sq mi (1,300 acres) of land to build OMS. On July 13, United States Auto Club (USAC) officials announced a planned groundbreaking date of November 1 of that year. However, within the month, the project's board of directors expressed frustration over delays in obtaining a tax-exempt ruling from the Internal Revenue Service (IRS), causing progress to be delayed. In August, documents drafted to send to the IRS for tax-exempt status approval were approved by the OMS board of directors. By October, IRS approval was scheduled to December; Stolte, Inc. chief executive officer William Loorz maintained that the track's situation was in "excellent shape" regarding financing. By this point, the amount of bonds proposed to be sold increased to $33.2 million.

On November 3, San Francisco Chronicle writer Gordon Martin reported that Filmways sold their interest of OMS to Stolte, Inc., leaving the latter as the sole developer of the project. The following month, both the city council and the OMS board of directors approved marketing $34 million of bonds to finance the track; these bonds were later given tax-exempt status in January 1967. However, in January 1967, with groundbreaking having not yet occurred, Loorz admitted a severe delay in groundbreaking due to a slow bond market in the summer of 1966. By the end of February, Loorz stated to the Los Angeles Times that the OMS project was officially "stalled" due to land options expiring; Loorz maintained that the project was "definitely not" scrapped.

==== Stolte, Inc. revival, construction ====
In March 1968, the Ontario City Council called for a session to review revised plans for OMS; the revised plans included a decrease in cost, construction time, and seating capacity, with an opening date scheduled for 1970. After previous separate failed attempts to obtain an underwriter from the Santa Anita Park, the Music Corporation of America, and a subsidiary of the Penn Central Railroad, in April, the Times reported that "some $25 million" worth of bonds were underwritten from Chicago company John Nuveen and Co., with writer Bob Thomas stating that the project would happen "beyond a reasonable doubt". In July, track officials announced plans to start construction in the fall of 1968, with construction being planned to finish within 24 months. Within the month, $25,500,000 (adjusted for inflation, $211,407,455) worth of tax-exempt revenue bonds were offered at a yield of 7.5%, which The New York Times described as "one of the most unusual sales of tax-exempt securities since passage of the income tax amendment in 1913". In later interviews, OMS director of special activities and racing driver Rodger Ward stated to the Progress-Bulletin that the $25.5 million was for financial security, stating, "The $25.5 million contract means that we could operate for 2½ years and not take in a dime and still stay in business." On the 19th, San Francisco Examiner writer Miles Ottenheimer reported that groundbreaking would take place in early August. However, in August, David B. Lockton, operating director and one of the main financiers of OMS, stated that groundbreaking would occur in September; a finalized date of September 24 was later given.

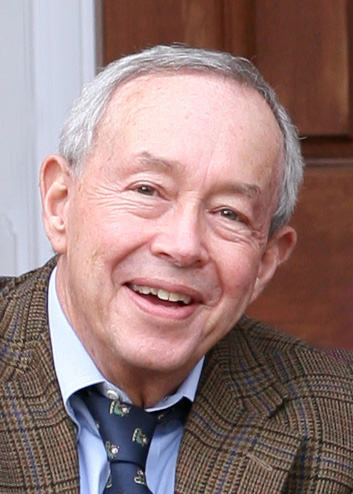
David B. Lockton (pictured in 2011), one of the main financiers of Ontario Motor Speedway, was the president of the track from March 1969 until April 1971.

Groundbreaking for OMS occurred on September 24, 1968. Various dignitaries attended the groundbreaking ceremony, including several racing drivers (Parnelli Jones, Rodger Ward, Jackie Stewart, Graham Hill, Mario Andretti, Darel Dieringer, Cale Yarborough, among others), several motorsports businessmen (Tony Hulman, Wally Parks, J. C. Agajanian, among others), and actor Kirk Douglas. Two months later, David B. MacTavish was elected as OMS' president. In January 1969, MacTavish announced the first major event for the facility: a 500 mi (800 km) Indy-car race sanctioned by the United States Auto Club (USAC). MacTavish's tenure was short; he departed as president in March, with Lockton taking over as president. With the departure of both MacTavish and publicity director Bob Russo, Lockton admitted that the track was not in "a healthy looking situation" but stated that he was optimistic about OMS being finished. In April, work began on the track's clubhouse building, with grading on the track progressing far enough to where the track layouts were "taking form". In addition, OMS officials stated that they were close to finalizing USAC and stock car races to inaugurate the track. The following month, despite a delay of 25 days due to a rainy winter, Loorz stated that progress was "caught up", with work being made on irrigation lines and other buildings; according to Loorz, about 15% of the total concrete needed for construction was poured. By July, with work starting on precasting crash walls and seven infield tunnels being completed, Stolte, Inc. spokesman Robert L. Johnson stated that progress was "one-third completed". However, a heavy equipment strike that began within the month caused a delay for "a couple of weeks".

In September, with the track layouts ready for paving, work began on the track's landscaping project, which included two lakes, irrigation systems, and other beautification projects. By the end of November, work on the track had "passed the halfway point" according to the Press-Telegram's Hank Hollingworth. By January 1970, most of the infield road course layouts and parts of the oval were paved. Although rain at the beginning of the year delayed paving work on the oval, by February, paving on the road course was completed, with work beginning on grandstand installation alongside other fan and crew amenities in the following month. Within the month of February, Dan Gurney became the first driver to test the track's road course. He gave a positive review of the track, stating, "It's going to be a good, competitive track for all types of cars... It's wide and fast, and damn challenging." The first tests on the oval were run on April 13 by Ward, Mario Andretti, Al Unser, and Joe Leonard. By June, all permanent grandstand seats were installed. Further tests were run in June and July by various drivers, including A. J. Foyt, Mark Donohue, Joe Leonard, Al Unser, Lloyd Ruby, and Johnny Rutherford. Days before the track's official opening, a one-day strike on August 18 initiated by the Teamsters Union occurred due to conflicts with the Building and Trades Council of San Bernardino; according to a track spokesman, the strike did not affect work progress "seriously".

=== First years ===
==== First events ====
"When I look back at it, I quite frankly don't know how we did it. We talked earlier about luck; had I known what actually had to have been accomplished to get it all together I would've quit very early on. I was 29 years old and I didn't know better, and I had a stubborn streak of moving forward."

— David B. Lockton's comments on the difficulty to secure four major races for each season, July 20, 2020

According to Lockton, OMS was designed to host four major races per year. On July 31, 1969, OMS officially announced its opening race: a USAC-sanctioned 500 mi (800 km) event on September 6, 1970, named the California 500. Further opening races were announced in the following months, including a National Hot Rod Association (NHRA)-sanctioned international drag racing event on November 22, 1970, a NASCAR-sanctioned event on February 28, 1971, under the national touring NASCAR Grand National Series (now known as the NASCAR Cup Series) banner, and an American Motorcyclist Association event on October 17, 1971. In addition, OMS applied for a Formula One World Championship event in March–May 1971. Although the application was approved by the Automobile Competition Committee for the United States (ACCUS), it was denied by Formula One's international sanctioning organization, the Fédération Internationale de l'Automobile (FIA), due to the application being submitted after the FIA's deadline of March 19, 1970. In response, the track's board of directors instead opted to pursue an invitational exhibition race with a combination of both Formula One and Formula A (last known as Formula 5000) cars on March 28, 1970. The race, eventually known as the 1971 Questor Grand Prix, was announced in January 1971 with the event being sanctioned by the Sports Car Club of America (SCCA).

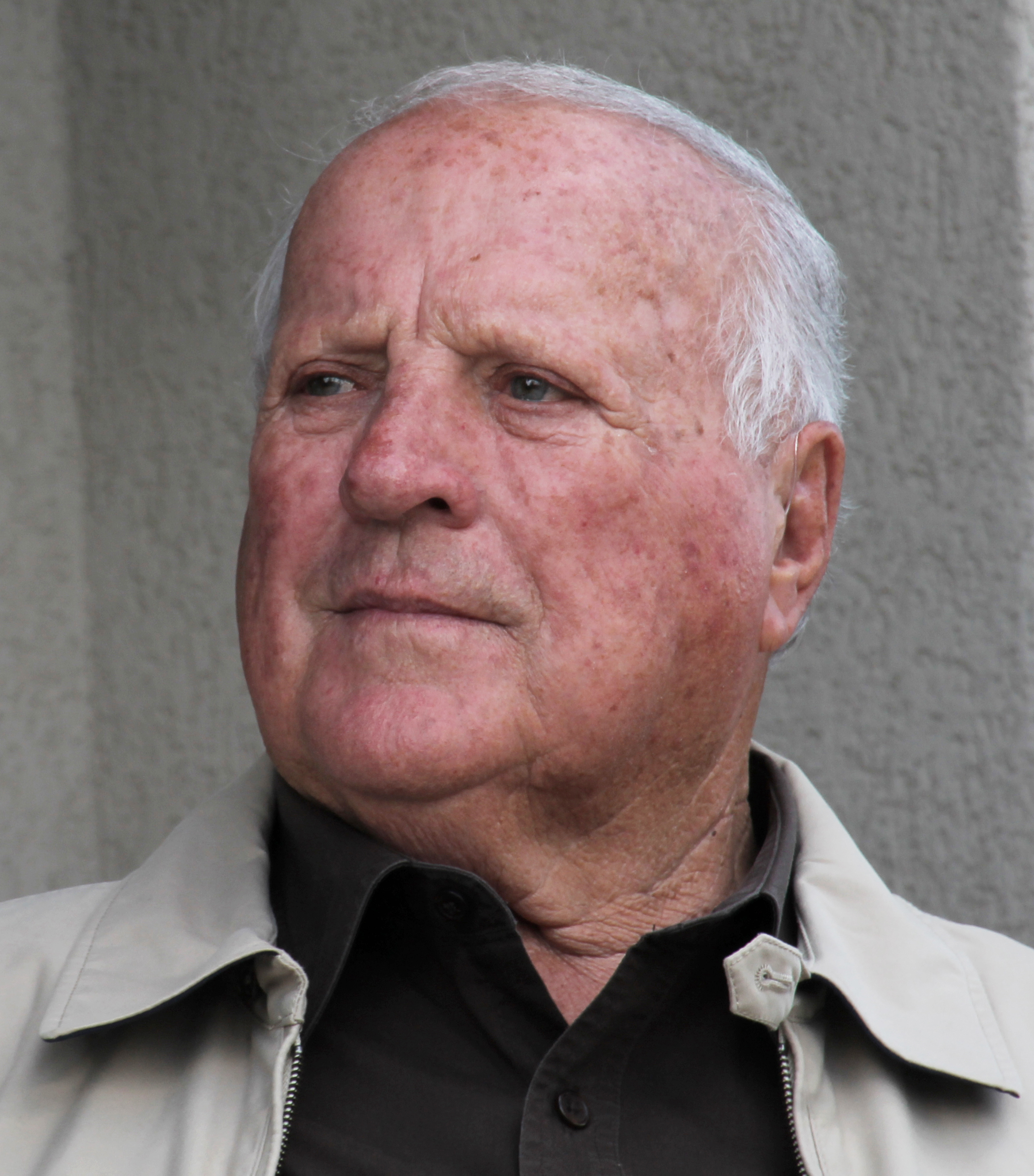
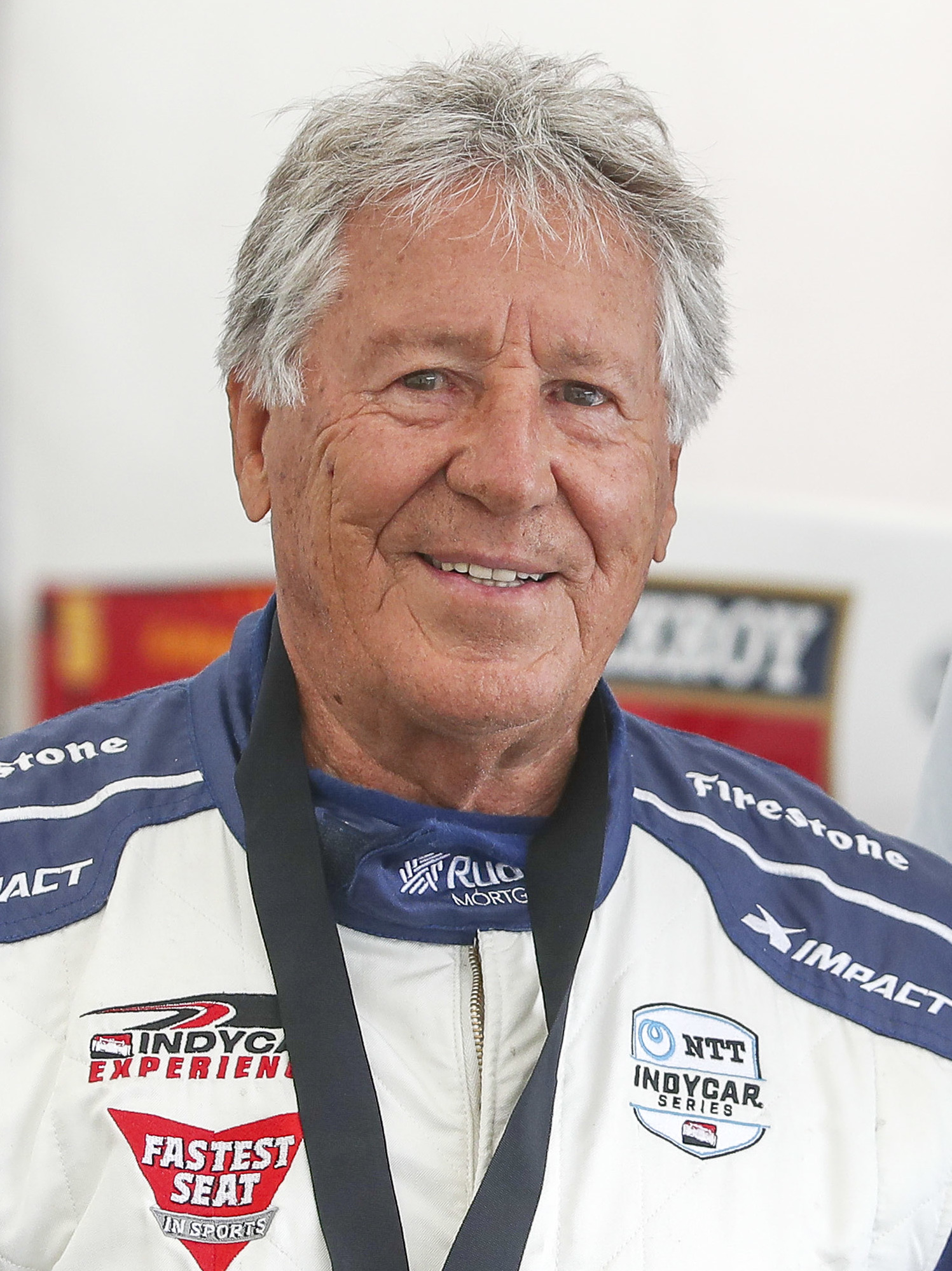
A. J. Foyt (left) and Mario Andretti (right) won the first NASCAR Cup Series race and the first major road course race at Ontario Motor Speedway, respectively.

The first race at OMS occurred on August 9, 1970, for a pro-am celebrity race only open to members of the media which was won by driver-actor duo Mario Andretti and Dick Smothers. OMS officially opened to the public on August 22, 1970, for first practice of the 1970 California 500. The 1970 California 500, the track's first major event, ran on September 6, with Jim McElreath winning the event in front of a reported audience of 180,233. The first NHRA event occurred from November 20–22 on the track's pit road. The first NASCAR Cup Series race occurred on February 28, 1971, with A. J. Foyt winning the event. The Questor Grand Prix, the first major race on OMS' road course, was held on March 28, 1971, with Andretti winning the event. The first AMA event was held on October 17, 1971, with John Cooper winning the event.

==== Financial troubles, resignations, bankruptcy ====
On April 28, 1971, Lockton resigned as president of OMS, with director of planning and construction Ray T. Smartis becoming general manager and taking over Lockton's duties. With Lockton's resignation, he admitted a month later that the track lost money in 1970 and was projected to lose more in 1971; in addition, he stated that the track's construction had gone over-budget, costing $30,000,000 (adjusted for inflation, $248,714,653) to build. In later years, he stated that the group underestimated numerous factors, including the cost of maintaining OMS and the failure to secure a television rights deal that the group anticipated for a significant portion of its revenue; according to Lockton, he thought that no deal was made due to a lack of interest from television companies at the time of the track's construction. In addition, Lockton blamed a lack of promotion for its races after the first event due to the pushback from track leaders, with Lockton being known for using "glamour" and Hollywood celebrities for promotion. By June, RIR general manager Les Richter stated to the Progress-Bulletin that an operations merger between OMS and RIR was "not out of the question", but also admitted that "right now that is not in the cards". By the following month, multiple other OMS executives resigned, including Rodger Ward, with San Francisco Chronicle writer Gordon Martin stating that OMS was "heavily indebted". Smartis later stated in an August 1971 interview that he was "sick to death of hearing that this place is in trouble financially", stating that the track was able to maintain paying rent and a good credit score. Despite Smartis' statement, in September, the Progress-Bulletin reported that OMS had lost approximately $1,000,000 in its opening six months. OMS did undergo some renovations in its first year of operations, including the removal of the track's aprons on each of the track's four turns due to safety reasons.

Smartis' tenure was short, resigning as general manager on November 2, 1971. Despite his resignation, OMS official Monty Roberts stated that the financial situation of OMS was in "better financial shape today than it ever has been". Smartis' replacement was announced a month after, with racing promoter John R. Cooper becoming president. Upon the announcement, Cooper admitted that "I don't know if Ontario Motor Speedway can be made into a profitable venture in 1972", with the track at risk of not being able to pay semi-annual rent payments. In January 1972, facing a deficit of $2,375,000, OMS officials sought the approval from the San Bernardino County Assessment Appeals Board to decrease the value of the track to reduce property taxes; it was approved. In March, San Bernardino County tax assessor John Bevis appealed the decision; the tax reduction was upheld a year later. Also in March, the Americana Turf Club began proposing to the California Horse Racing Board to build a horse racing facility in the infield of Ontario Motor Speedway, proposing to host Sunday and Monday racing for 44 weeks a year with no significant effect on the track's auto racing activities. According to Cooper, the plan was made to help ease the financial problems of OMS. The proposal was officially filed to the Horse Racing Board in August of that year and rejected three months later.

By July 1972, fears of the operators not being able to pay semi-annual rent payments due to a lack of revenue and revenue-generating events were expressed by San Bernardino Sun writer Henry Mendoza. In September, Cooper stated to the Copley News Service that he was "sure [OMS] won't" default on payments despite admitting difficulties in paying "the day-by-day rent" and interest payments. However, by mid-October, OMS executive vice president Dallas Gardner stated that the operators would not be able to pay their annual rent payment of $1,065,000; this was later confirmed by Cooper. In November, the owners of OMS began seeking other operators to potentially operate the facility. On November 29, with the operators of OMS facing $9,700,000 (adjusted for inflation, $74,659,905) in losses and defaulting on numerous payments, including a lease payment of approximately $2,000,000, the operators officially announced the track's closure. Despite the closure, various groups continued to operate the track, including the Bob Bondurant School of High Performance Driving, a driving school. In December, the city of Ontario began hearing proposals from various groups interested in operating OMS. However, by the end of the month, none were accepted, with some potential bidders reluctant to operate OMS due to high amounts of back taxes.

On January 4, 1973, the owners approved Conrad Sprenger, owner of the local KSOM radio stations, to operate OMS on a one-year lease under the newly-formed Western Racing Associates. However, Sprenger backed out of the lease within the month due to a lack of potential profit. As a result, major races scheduled to be held in 1973 were delayed indefinitely. Due to high winds and heavy rains, numerous buildings and other amenities on track property suffered damage, including several buildings collapsing. In late February, the track's office and maintenance equipment was scheduled to be sold on the decision of the Ontario City Council if back taxes were not paid; however, this decision was postponed. A deadline was set in April for the owners of OMS to pay over $119,000 in taxes by April 28.

=== Brief Jones and Hulman years ===
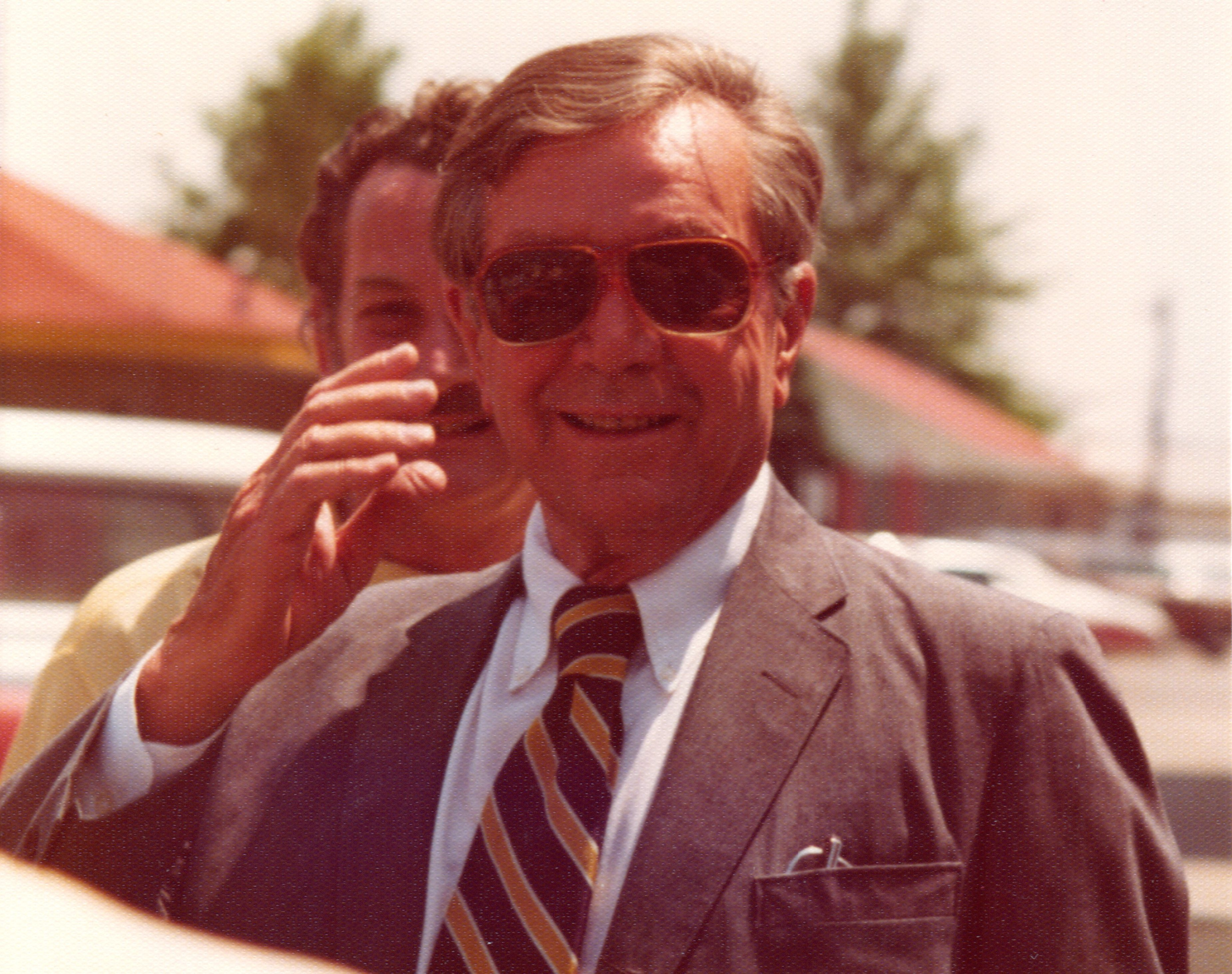
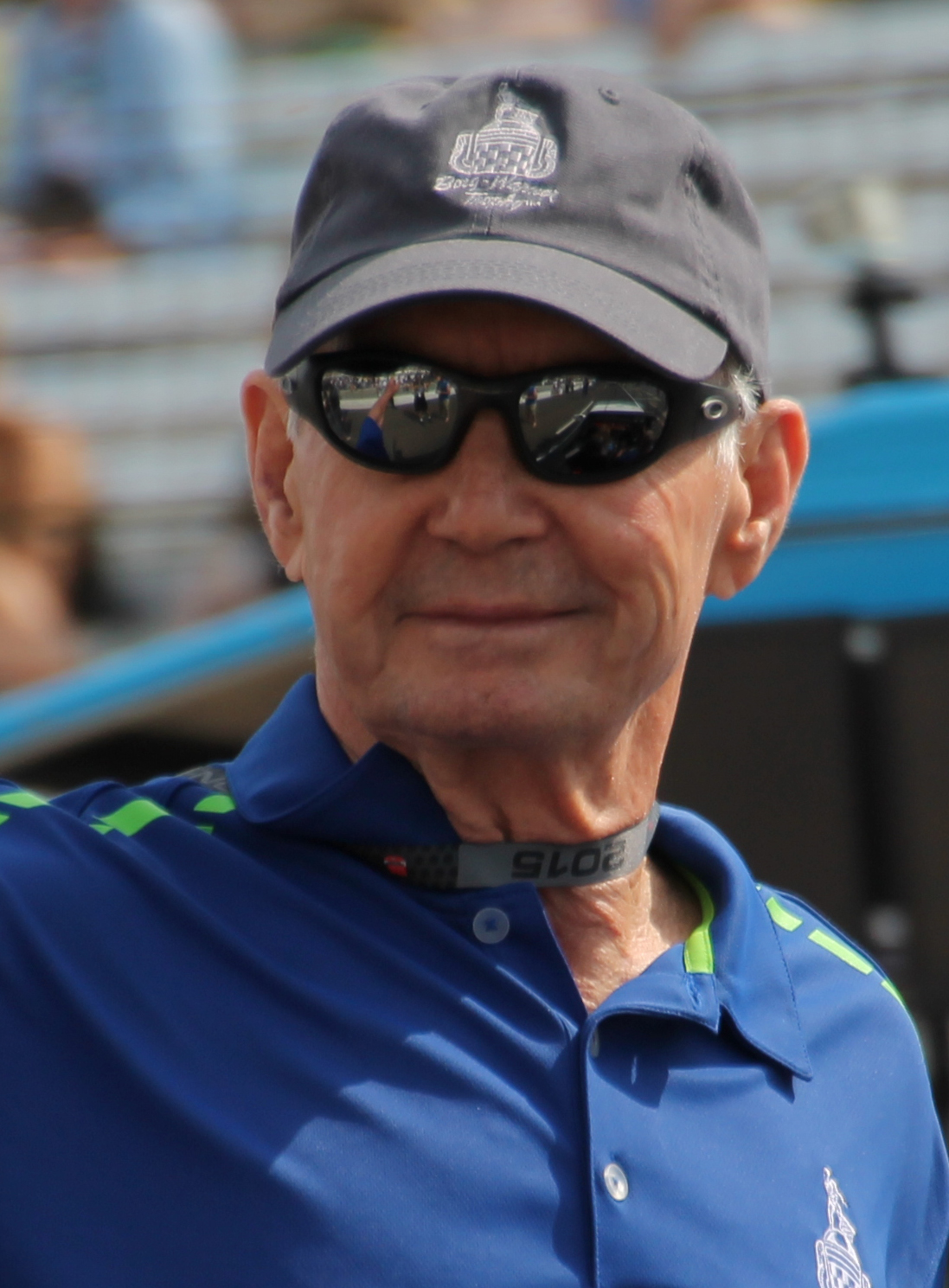
A group led by Tony Hulman (left) and Parnelli Jones (right) took over the operations of Ontario Motor Speedway in April 1973.

On March 9, a hearing on potential operators was held by the council, which included a proposal from racing driver Parnelli Jones. On the 24th, attorney Dudley Gray, who represented Jones, stated that the group needed 10 days to finalize a proposal. On April 3, Gray announced to The San Bernardino Sun plans to file a proposal to operate OMS with decreased lease payments. Seven days later, an operating group led by Tony Hulman and Jones, known as the Ontario Motor Speedway Operating Company (OMSOC), was approved for a one-year lease without rent payments by the city of Ontario and the owners of OMS, with Jones appointed as the track's president. The group additionally also had two five-year options to extend their lease on the agreement that if agreed to, rent payments would increase by year. In comparison to the previous operating group, OMSOC leaders stated plans to be more "realistic" about revenue projections and to reduce spending, describing the spending of OMS, Inc. as excessive. Some amenities were also added or renovated before the first motorsports event at the track, including additional first aid stations and general landscaping.

To reopen OMS, a series of rock concerts were scheduled for 1973. After the first one was cancelled, OMS officially reopened on July 29 for a concert that featured Leon Russell and Loggins and Messina. The first motorsports event hosted under OMSOC was held on September 2. In November, OMSOC agreed to the first five-year option despite a rejection of rent payment decreases from OMS, Corp. By March 1975, however, OMSOC was reported to owe nearly $200,000 in overdue taxes and payments according to the Associated Press, with the group considered ending the lease early due to financial troubles. On March 25, the group officially announced its plans to pull out of their lease on the 31st, despite the city stating that the earliest the group could pull out of the lease was March 31, 1976. Despite the announcement, OMS Corp. officials announced plans to continue hosting races. On April 1, after their operating lease expired, OMSOC forfeited operating control to OMS Corp. Jones would later blame the group's failure on the 1970s energy crisis, inclement weather, and the city of Ontario for rejecting to let the facility stage rock concerts after the California Jam. In June, the Bank of America began recommending the foreclosure and sale of OMS to pay off bondholders. However, in March 1977, the Bank of America indefinitely delayed any action of foreclosure until a financial report was made for the planned Expo '81, a world's fair, which was planned to be hosted at OMS.

=== Ray Smartis years, Expo '81 cancellation and subsequent sale ===
Seven days after the lease expired, Ray Smartis was reappointed as OMS' general manager. With his reappointment, Smartis announced plans to cut spending with "extreme austerity", move race dates, and focus more on advertising races. Smartis further blamed OMSOC's failure on a lack of advertising and its marquee event, the California 500, being moved to March under OMSOC. To cut spending, he stated plans to cut the amount of full-time administrative staff to seven and to cut overhead expenses. Smartis also stated plans to expand the track's usage and events, stating hopes to host swap meets, filming production, and other events, stating in The San Bernardino Sun that "we won't run anything unless it makes money". On June 22, the first and only fatal accident at OMS occurred after motorcycle rider Steven W. Fikes crashed into a cement barrier during a practice session for an American Federation of Motorcyclists event, dying of head injuries on July 1.

In the mid-1970s, OMS drafted plans to host Expo '81, a world's fair officially recognized by the Bureau International des Expositions (BIE). The exposition was seen as a last chance for the track to become profitable and to pay bondholders. However, by April 1978 with the chances of hosting Expo '81 at OMS looking "bleak" and with the track nearly $35,000,000 (adjusted for inflation, $172,767,857) in debt, a potential sale of OMS was put "in jeopardy". The exposition was effectively cancelled on May 1, 1978, due to a lack of support from the United States Department of Commerce, with Bank of America planning to seek foreclosure within the week. In later years, longtime Rose Parade television announcer Bill Welsh stated that if Expo '81 had happened, OMS could "still be a reality".

==== New owner search ====
Soon after the cancellation of Expo '81, an offer of $12 million from the Security Management Company was publicly revealed on June 30, with the company interested in turning the land into a "commercial-industrial park". The offer was sent out to approximately 2,000 bondholders to vote on whether they approved of the offer or not, which eventually was rejected by the bondholders within the year. By 1979, two more confidential offers that were being considered by OMS Corp. were reported by the Bank of America; both wanted to maintain the track. In November of that year, Bank of America trustee Peet Saaret began preliminary legal steps for the sale of the facility, with Saaret estimating that $42,000,000 was needed to satisfy all bondholder obligations. Letters for bondholders to vote on whether to sell the track or lease it were sent in December, which included another offer from the Security Management Company. However, by the following month, with only $4,000,000 of the $25,500,000 worth of the bondholders having voted, Bank of America attorney Edmund Hamburger stated that the "situation is murky". By February 1980, both the Security Management Company and the Campeau Corporation pulled their offers, stating that the Bank of America caused "unnecessary delays" and claiming that the bank favored foreclosure.

In March 1980, a group named the Ontario Foothill Development Corporation announced their proposal to purchase OMS for approximately $42,000,000; the amount needed to pay off all bondholder obligations. The offer was approved by OMS' bondholders the following month. After the approval, the businessmen involved in the group were revealed, which included Ted Dutton of the Security Management Company and Don Wheeler of New York-based Sterling Grace Municipal Securities. The group announced their plans to continue hosting motorsports at OMS if the venture was economically feasible alongside the construction of a mixed-use commercial and residential center built around the track, which included convention centers, a golf course, condominiums, apartments, luxury hotels, restaurants, and sports complexes. A deadline of June 1 was set for the group to complete the transaction; however, the group asked bondholders in June to delay the deadline to September 8, which was approved. The group did not finalize the deal by the new deadline, leading Bank of America to seek out a potential new buyer, which was rumored to be with the Chevron Land and Development Company, a subsidiary of Chevron.

Later in September, Hamburger stated that "serious discussions" were occurring with the Chevron Land and Development Company to purchase OMS. Chevron intended to build a 1,540-acre (620 ha) mixed-use commercial and residential center, then-called the Ontario International Center, which parts of it would be built on the 680 acres (280 ha) that OMS was situated on. On October 9, OMS Corp. approved an offer from the Chevron Land Company to purchase OMS for $42,000,000, which included Chevron paying $13,400,000 in over-due interest and all other obligations to bondholders on the condition that the city of Ontario give up their interest in the facility. Chevron formally agreed to the purchase on the 22nd, agreeing to give $36,400,000 to OMS Corp. which included back taxes, over-due interest, $1,000,000 in closing costs, and bonds that matured in 1998. The Ontario City Council unanimously approved the purchase in November. The actual purchase price of the track itself was later valued at $10,000,000 according to NASCAR executive Ken Clapp, who worked heavily with motorsports on the American West Coast. He later described the purchase price as "an absolute theft" due to the potential land value of the facility, stating that the price "was generally not known by the track's investors and bondholders". According to Clapp, by 1980, land prices were approximately $150,000 per acre.

=== Closure, demolition, and redevelopment ===
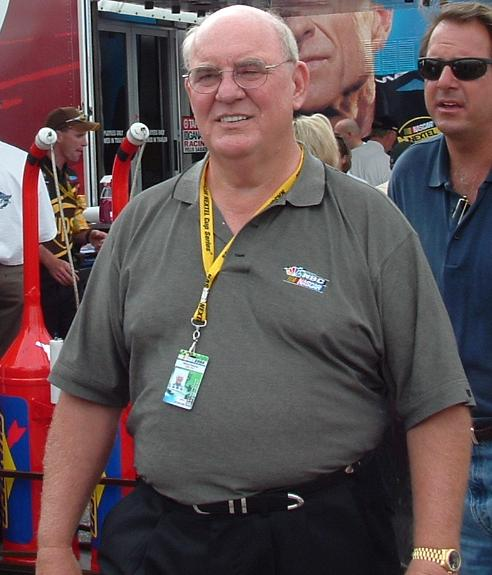
Benny Parsons (pictured above) won the final race at Ontario Motor Speedway on November 15, 1980.

The final race at OMS was held on November 15, 1980, with Benny Parsons winning the 1980 Los Angeles Times 500, a NASCAR Cup Series race. On December 16, 1980, with ownership of OMS officially transferring to Chevron, Chevron's leaders officially announced the closure of OMS and their plans to demolish the facility at a cost of around $4,000,000. Dick Miescke, vice president of Chevron's southern division, stated that OMS had "proven to be totally uneconomic as a raceway". In the wake of its closing, the facility was described as a "white elephant" by various newspapers, with San Francisco Chronicle writer Gordon Martin calling OMS as "the world's gaudiest racing facility" and a "monstrosity". In late January 1981, OMS hosted a ceremonial closeout sale to the public, selling the remainder of its merchandise and other memorabilia to the public. On March 29, a rally that opposed the demolition of OMS and encouraged the boycott of Chevron-related products occurred, with the rally attracting approximately 300 people.

==== Redevelopment timeline ====
By May 1981, demolition of OMS began with the removal of some amenities. Several amenities were sold to various motorsports facilities, including Daytona International Speedway, Riverside International Raceway, Michigan International Speedway, the organizers of the Caesars Palace Grand Prix, and the Fremont Dragstrip. With demolition fully underway by July, plans were announced to build three hotels and an office space building on the former OMS site, with groundbreaking on one of the hotels scheduled for January 1982. In October, the final phase of demolition started, with work beginning on the track's grandstands. By early January 1982, Chevron project manager Bill Wren stated that demolition was "near completion".

The Ontario Center, built as part of a growing Inland Empire in the 1980s and 1990s, had a reported budget of $1,000,000,000 and a completion date of sometime in the mid-1990s, with project leaders predicting that it would add 30,000 jobs to the Ontario economy. After groundbreaking was delayed by years, work on the first building, an office building named the First Financial Center, broke ground in September 1984 and opened on October 30, 1985. The first hotel on Ontario Center, a Hilton hotel, broke ground in November 1984 and opened in January 1986. Dirt beams which were used to support the track's grandstands, some of the last remaining remnants of OMS, were completely demolished by August 1986. By February 1986, The San Bernardino Sun reported that negotiations to build a mall at the Ontario Center was "nearing the end". The first mall for the center, the Plaza Continental, was announced and broke ground in October 1986 and opened by February 1989.

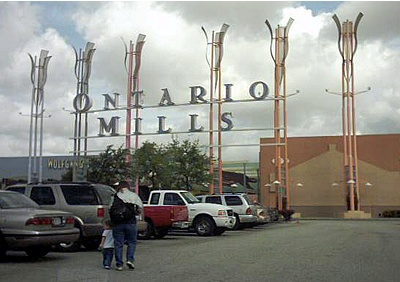
Signage of the Ontario Mills mall (pictured in 2005). The mall is part of the Ontario Center project built on the former property of OMS.

In September 1990, the Ontario Center School, a grade school, opened on the former OMS property; its opening was attended by Jim McElreath, who won the first major race at OMS. By 1991, with numerous office buildings and apartments having been constructed, Chevron began selling land parcels in the Ontario Center to developers and removed itself from involvement in the project's construction. In 1995, Chevron announced plans to sell the Ontario Center development alongside its other real estate holdings in California. The Ontario Mills mall, first proposed in 1988, was completed in 1996 and opened on November 14 of the same year. The last remaining part of OMS, a sign used to advertise races, was kept as part of the Ontario Mills mall. As of the 2020s, other developments have also been constructed on the former property of OMS, including a public park named after the track, the Toyota Arena, and other commercial and residential developments.

== Events and uses ==
=== Auto racing ===
==== Open-wheel racing ====
OMS' marquee event, the California 500, was hosted annually from 1970 until 1980. From 1970 until 1978, the event was sanctioned by the United States Auto Club (USAC). In 1979, in the wake of the USAC–CART split, Championship Auto Racing Teams (CART) took over sanctioning duties for the race until its final iteration the year after. According to then-general manager Ray Smartis, OMS switched to CART because the organization was more profitable to host than USAC, with the track being in major financial trouble at the time. After OMS closed, the California 500 was moved to the nearby Riverside International Raceway.

In addition, OMS held the 1971 Questor Grand Prix, an exhibition race sanctioned by the Sports Car Club of America that featured a combination of Formula One and Formula A (last known as Formula 5000) cars. The event, held on March 28 and advertised as a battle between American and European drivers and car manufacturers, was generally considered a failure due to low attendance and lack of competitiveness, with the event losing approximately $110,000 according to the Associated Press. After the Questor Grand Prix, OMS planned to host a Formula One World Championship event for the 1972 season, the United States Grand Prix West, on April 9, 1972. However, the main sponsor for the event, the Questor Corporation, pulled their sponsorship of the event in July 1971, effectively scrapping the event. Both OMS and Questor Corporation officials blamed high fees to guarantee a Formula One World Championship event.

==== Stock car racing ====
The NASCAR Cup Series raced annually at OMS for most of the track's existence, first racing at the facility in 1971. After a NASCAR race was not held in 1973 due to OMS' financial troubles, the series returned the year after, with OMS hosting the final race of the NASCAR Cup Series season. NASCAR continued running races at OMS annually as the final race of the Cup Series season until the track's closure in 1980, running its final event in November of that year. In addition to NASCAR, OMS also held annual USAC-sanctioned stock car races from 1977 to 1979.

==== Drag racing ====
From 1970 until the track's closure in 1980, the track held an annual NHRA Drag Racing Series event. From 1974 until 1980, OMS hosted the NHRA's World Finals, the final event of the NHRA season.

==== Sports car racing ====
OMS hosted two IMSA GT Championship races throughout its existence. It first hosted the series on May 19, 1974, and its second and last race on May 9, 1976.

==== Other racing events ====
OMS hosted various other forms of auto racing throughout its existence, including events sanctioned by the American Motorcyclist Association (AMA), big rig racing, and racing events hosted by the International Human Powered Vehicle Association.

=== Music festivals ===
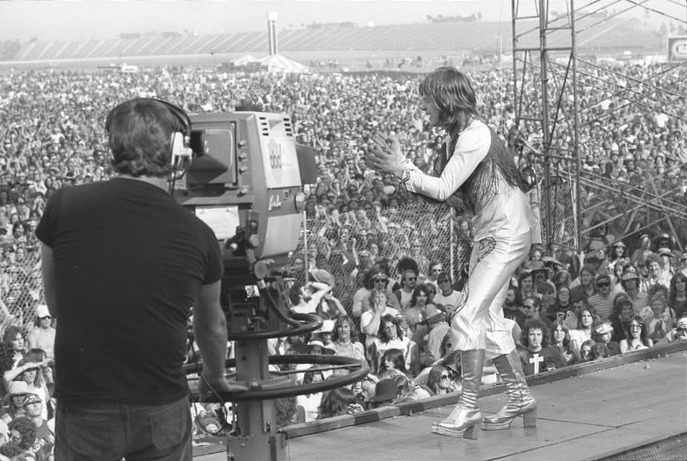
Ozzy Osbourne of Black Sabbath performing at California Jam in 1974 at Ontario Motor Speedway.

On April 6, 1974, OMS hosted the California Jam, a rock music festival produced by ABC Entertainment. The festival, which had a reported attendance of approximately 200,000 according to local Californian newspapers, was considered to be a success due to its high attendance and relative peacefulness compared to other rock music festivals at the time. In 1978, OMS another rock music festival advertised as the "encore" to California Jam, California Jam II, on March 18. California Jam II, which drew a reported crowd of approximately 250,000 to 350,000 according to various sources, was also considered a success.

=== Other events and uses ===
OMS was used for filming production for various television shows and movies, including Death Race 2000 (1975) and an episode of Charlie's Angels.

==== Unrealized events ====
- In 1974, OMS planned to host a rock festival on August 3 promoted by Cornucopia Productions, with Crosby, Stills, Nash & Young as the main headliner. However, after the concert was postponed to September 21, it was cancelled due to low ticket sales.
- In 1979, OMS planned to host California Jam III, a sequel to California Jam and California Jam II that ultimately never occurred after the concert was postponed.
- OMS was planned to be the site of Expo '81, a world's fair officially recognized by the Bureau International des Expositions (BIE). OMS was selected as a potential location for the exposition on November 13, 1975, by organizers seeking to host it in California. OMS was approved by the United States Department of Commerce and the BIE on April 23 and November 17, respectively, with then-United States president Gerald Ford signing final approval on December 20. The fair was cancelled in May 1978 due to a lack of funding despite numerous deadline extensions for financing and a subsequent recommendation from U. S. Department of Commence Secretary Juanita M. Kreps for president Jimmy Carter to reject the exposition.

== Lap records ==
The fastest official race lap records at Ontario Motor Speedway are listed as:

Category	Time	Driver	Vehicle	Event
Oval (1970–1981): 2.500 mi (4.023 km)
Original Road Course (1970–1980): 3.194 mi (5.140 km)
Formula One	1:42.777	Pedro Rodriguez	BRM P160	1971 Questor Grand Prix
Second Road Course (1974–1976): 2.900 mi (4.667 km)
F5000	1:29.254	Brian Redman	Lola T332	1974 California Grand Prix
IMSA GT	1:43.604	Michael Keyser	Chevrolet Monza	1976 International Motorsports Spectacular
