= Chuck Barnes =

American businessman (died 1979)

- Born: Charles M. Barnes Jr. Akron, Ohio, U.S.
- Died: May 28, 1979 (aged 48) near Three Rivers, California, U.S.
- Resting place: Holy Cross Cemetery
- Education: University of Southern California (BA)
- Occupations: Sports agent; businessman
- Children: 2

Charles M. Barnes Jr. (died May 28, 1979) was an American sports agent and businessman.

== Early life ==
Charles M. Barnes Jr. was born in Akron, Ohio. He was the son of former Dayton Tire & Rubber Company president Pat Barnes and a former P.R. manager for Firestone. He graduated from the University of Southern California in 1953 with a Bachelor of Arts.

== Career ==
After graduating, Barnes was a public information officer with the United States Air Force for two years. He attained the rank of first lieutenant. He then worked as a salesman for Texaco for two years. He worked in the public relations department for Firestone Tire and Rubber Company in Akron and Los Angeles. He worked there for six years and was manager when he left in 1963.

In the early 1960s, Barnes moved to Indianapolis. He founded Sports Headliners in December 1963 and took on the role of manager. His clients were racers Rodger Ward, A. J. Foyt, Parnelli Jones, Mario Andretti, and Al and Bobby Unser. He later had clients in other sports, including O. J. Simpson, Pat Haden, Johnny Unitas, Evel Knievel and Calvin Hill. He negotiated O. J. Simpson's contract with the Buffalo Bills, which at its time was the largest contract for a professional football player, at over US$300,000 a year.

Barnes helped form the American Basketball Association. He was a representative along with E. J. Bannon for the Indianapolis group at the league's charter meeting when the Indiana Pacers joined the league. In 1970, he moved his headquarters to Los Angeles. He was a member of the group that built the Ontario Motor Speedway. He served as the speedway's president for a time. Barnes briefly served as president, then commissioner of the World Football League.

== Personal life ==
Barnes had two daughters, Lisa and Carla.

Barnes died while swimming in the Kaweah River near Three Rivers, California, on May 28, 1979, aged 48. He was buried in Holy Cross Cemetery in Inglewood.
