= 1951 AAA Championship Car season =

Sports season

- AAA National Championship Trail

Season
- Races: 15
- Start date: May 30
- End date: November 11

Awards
- National champion: (United States) Tony Bettenhausen
- Indianapolis 500 winner: (United States) Lee Wallard

The 1951 AAA Championship Car season consisted of 15 races, beginning in Speedway, Indiana on May 30 and concluding in San Mateo, California on November 11. There was also one non-championship event in Mechanicsburg, Pennsylvania. The AAA National Champion was Tony Bettenhausen, and the Indianapolis 500 winner was Lee Wallard.

== Schedule and results ==
| Rnd | Date | Race name | Track | Location | Type | Pole position | Winning driver |
|---|---|---|---|---|---|---|---|
| 1 | May 30 | (United States) International 500 Mile Sweepstakes^{A} | Indianapolis Motor Speedway | Speedway, Indiana | Paved | (United States) Duke Nalon | (United States) Lee Wallard |
| 2 | June 10 | (United States) Rex Mays Classic | Wisconsin State Fair Park Speedway | West Allis, Wisconsin | Dirt | (United States) Jack McGrath | (United States) Tony Bettenhausen |
| 3 | June 24 | (United States) Langhorne 100 | Langhorne Speedway | Langhorne, Pennsylvania | Dirt | (United States) Jack McGrath | (United States) Tony Bettenhausen |
| 4 | July 4 | (United States) Darlington 250 | Darlington Raceway | Darlington, South Carolina | Paved | (United States) Johnny McDowell | (United States) Walt Faulkner |
| NC | July 29 | (United States) Indianapolis Sweepstakes | Williams Grove Speedway | Mechanicsburg, Pennsylvania | Dirt | (United States) Troy Ruttman | (United States) Troy Ruttman |
| 5 | August 18 | (United States) Springfield 100 | Illinois State Fairgrounds | Springfield, Illinois | Dirt | (United States) Paul Russo | (United States) Tony Bettenhausen |
| 6 | August 26 | (United States) Milwaukee 200 | Wisconsin State Fair Park Speedway | West Allis, Wisconsin | Dirt | (United States) Johnny McDowell | (United States) Walt Faulkner |
| 7 | September 1 | (United States) Ted Horn Memorial | DuQuoin State Fairgrounds | Du Quoin, Illinois | Dirt | (United States) Johnnie Parsons | (United States) Tony Bettenhausen |
| 8 | September 3 | (United States) Du Quoin 150^{B} | DuQuoin State Fairgrounds | Du Quoin, Illinois | Dirt | (United States) Tony Bettenhausen | (United States) Tony Bettenhausen |
| 9 | September 3 | (United States) Pikes Peak Auto Hill Climb | Pikes Peak Highway | Pikes Peak, Colorado | Hill | (United States) Louis Unser^{C} | (United States) Al Rogers |
| 10 | September 8 | (United States) Syracuse 100^{D} | Syracuse Mile | Syracuse, New York | Dirt | (United States) Tony Bettenhausen | (United States) Tony Bettenhausen |
| 11 | September 9 | (United States) Detroit 100 | Michigan State Fairgrounds Speedway | Detroit, Michigan | Dirt | (United States) Johnny McDowell | (United States) Paul Russo |
| 12 | September 23 | (United States) Denver 100 | Centennial Race Track | Littleton, Colorado | Dirt | (United States) Tony Bettenhausen | (United States) Tony Bettenhausen |
| 13 | October 21 | (United States) San Jose 100 | San Jose Speedway | San Jose, California | Dirt | (United States) Tony Bettenhausen | (United States) Tony Bettenhausen |
| 14 | November 4 | (United States) Phoenix 100 | Arizona State Fairgrounds | Phoenix, Arizona | Dirt | (United States) Henry Banks | (United States) Johnnie Parsons |
| 15 | November 11 | (United States) Bay Meadows 150 | Bay Meadows Race Track | San Mateo, California | Dirt | (United States) Jack McGrath | (United States) Johnnie Parsons |

Paved/Dirt Oval
Road Course/Hill Climb
Non-championship race

^A Indianapolis 500 was AAA-sanctioned and counted towards the 1951 FIA World Championship of Drivers title.
^B Race stopped after 101 laps due to rain.
^C No pole is awarded for the Pikes Peak Hill Climb, in this schedule on the pole is the driver who started first. No lap led was awarded for the Pikes Peak Hill Climb, however, a lap was awarded to the drivers that completed the climb.
^D Race stopped after 67 laps due to wreck.

== Final points standings ==
Note1: The points became the car, when not only one driver led the car, the relieved driver became small part of the points. Points for driver method: (the points for the finish place) / (number the lap when completed the car) * (number the lap when completed the driver)

Note2: There were scoring omissions in the AAA records regarding laps completed for eight drivers in the Darlington and Milwaukee races in 1951. The statistics shown include the most accurate representation of those races that is available.

| Pos | Driver | INDY (United States) | MIL1 (United States) | LHS (United States) | DAR (United States) | SPR (United States) | MIL2 (United States) | DQSF1 (United States) | DQSF2 (United States) | PIK (United States) | SYR (United States) | MSF (United States) | CEN (United States) | SJS (United States) | ASF (United States) | BME (United States) | Pts |
|---|---|---|---|---|---|---|---|---|---|---|---|---|---|---|---|---|---|
| 1 | (United States) Tony Bettenhausen | 9 | 1 | 1 | 2 | 1 | 10 | 1 | **1** | | **1** | 4 | **1** | **1** | 13 | 2 | 2556 |
| 2 | (United States) Henry Banks | 6 | 11 | 10 | 7 | 4 | 5 | 6 | 5 | | 6 | 9 | 2 | 3 | **2** | 3 | 1856.6 |
| 3 | (United States) Walt Faulkner | 15 | | | 1 | DNQ | 1 | 4 | 2 | | 2 | 2 | 18 | DNQ | 6 | DNS | 1513.6 |
| 4 | (United States) Jack McGrath | 3 | **18** | **7** | 5 | 2 | 2 | 16 | 11 | | 7 | | 3 | 4 | 14 | **18** | 1460.4 |
| 5 | (United States) Mike Nazaruk RY | 2 | 8 | 9 | 8 | | 16 | | | | 18 | 3 | 15 | 16 | 18 | 15 | 1143 |
| 6 | (United States) Johnnie Parsons | 21 | DNQ | DNS | 23 | | 3 | **2** | 16 | | 17 | | 14 | 7 | 1 | 1 | 1012 |
| 7 | (United States) Lee Wallard | 1 | | | | | | | | | | | | | | | 1000 |
| 8 | (United States) Manuel Ayulo | DNS | 10 | 4 | 6 | 17 | 17 | | 6 | | 12 | 6 | 7 | DNQ | 9 | 11 | 997.5 |
| 9 | (United States) Andy Linden | 4 | 15 | 8 | 12 | DNQ | 22 | 9 | 7 | | 11 | | | | DNQ | 5 | 911 |
| 10 | (United States) Paul Russo | DNQ | 4 | | 13 | **14** | 9 | 3 | | | 15 | 1 | 13 | 2 | DNQ | 16 | 700 |
| 11 | (United States) Bill Schindler | 13 | 16 | 2 | 21 | 3 | 4 | 12 | | | 8 | | DNP | | 8 | 9 | 693.5 |
| 12 | (United States) Cecil Green | 22 | 2 | 3 | 3 | | | | | | | | | | | | 650 |
| 13 | (United States) Bobby Ball | 5 | DNQ | | | | | | | | | | 5 | 11 | 15 | 13 | 620 |
| 14 | (United States) Chuck Stevenson | 20 | DNQ | | 9 | 5 | 6 | 10 | 4 | | 9 | | DNP | | | | 538 |
| 15 | (United States) Duane Carter | 8 | 3 | 15 | DNS | 11 | | 17 | | | 13 | 8 | | | | 10 | 505 |
| 16 | (United States) Sam Hanks | 12 | | | | | | 5 | 3 | | DNQ | 5 | 10 | DNQ | | | 421.4 |
| 17 | (United States) Jimmy Davies | 16 | 14 | | 24 | 18 | 13 | 13 | 17 | | | | | 5 | 3 | 8 | 315 |
| 18 | (United States) Gene Force R | 11 | 7 | | 15 | 13 | 19 | | 10 | | | 18 | | DNQ | DNQ | 6 | 310.3 |
| 19 | (United States) Cliff Griffith | 28 | 9 | 11 | 11 | | 7 | 8 | 9 | | DNQ | | | | | | 308.4 |
| 20 | (United States) Neal Carter | | DNQ | 18 | 20 | 16 | | | | | DNQ | 13 | | 14 | 4 | 4 | 300 |
| 21 | (United States) Bill Mackey | 19 | 13 | | 4 | | | | | | | | | | | | 300 |
| 22 | (United States) Carl Forberg R | 7 | | | DNQ | | | | | | | | | | | | 300 |
| 23 | (United States) Bill Vukovich R | 29 | DNQ | 14 | 26 | 15 | 21 | 7 | DNQ | | 3 | 7 | 11 | 18 | | DNQ | 291.8 |
| 24 | (United States) Joe James | 33 | 17 | 12 | 28 | 12 | 15 | DNQ | 14 | | 16 | 15 | 4 | 8 | 5 | DNQ | 283 |
| 25 | (United States) Fred Agabashian | 17 | DNS | 6 | DNQ | | | | | | | | 6 | 6 | 17 | 12 | 278.2 |
| 26 | (United States) Jim Rigsby R | | | DNS | | 10 | 11 | 14 | 12 | | DNS | | 12 | 10 | 11 | 7 | 233.1 |
| 27 | (United States) Johnny McDowell | 32 | | 16 | **16** | 9 | **8** | 15 | 15 | | | **17** | 9 | 9 | 12 | DNP | 230 |
| 28 | (United States) Gordon Reid R | DNQ | 6 | 17 | 17 | 7 | 20 | 18 | 13 | | DNQ | 14 | 16 | 13 | 7 | 14 | 204 |
| 29 | (United States) Al Rogers | | | | | | | | | 1 | | | | | | | 200 |
| 30 | (United States) Rodger Ward | 27 | 5 | 13 | DNS | DNQ | | | | | | | 8 | 17 | 10 | 17 | 192 |
| 31 | (United States) Johnny Mauro | | | | | | | | | 2 | | | | | | | 160 |
| 32 | (United States) Duke Nalon | **10** | | | | | | | | | | | | | | | 150 |
| 33 | (United States) Louis Unser | | | | | | | | | **3** | | | | | | | 140 |
| 34 | (United States) Pete Woods | | | | | | | | | 4 | | | DNQ | DNQ | DNQ | | 120 |
| 35 | (United States) Harry King R | | | | | DNQ | DNQ | DNQ | 8 | | 5 | | DNQ | | | | 117.5 |
| 36 | (United States) Eddie Johnson | | | | | | | | | | 4 | 11 | | | | | 100.4 |
| 37 | (United States) Ray Knepper | DNQ | DNQ | 5 | 22 | | | | | | | | | | | | 100 |
| 38 | (United States) Herb Bryers | | | | | | | | | 5 | | | | | | | 100 |
| 39 | (United States) Troy Ruttman | 23 | | | | 6 | | | | | | | | 15 | | | 80 |
| 40 | (United States) Charles Bryant | | | | | | | | | 6 | | | | | | | 80 |
| 41 | (United States) Joe Garson R | | | | | 8 | DNQ | 11 | 18 | | DNQ | | DNQ | | | DNQ | 70 |
| 42 | (United States) Bob Finney | | | | | | | | | 7 | | | | | | | 60 |
| 43 | (United States) Shelby Hill | | | | | | | | | 8 | | | | | | | 50 |
| 44 | (United States) Mack Hellings | 31 | | DNQ | | | | | | 9 | | | | | DNQ | | 40 |
| 45 | (United States) Johnnie Tolan | DNQ | 12 | | DNS | DNQ | 14 | | DNQ | | DNQ | 10 | DNQ | | | | 40 |
| 46 | (United States) Jimmy Good | | | | | | | | | 10 | | | | | | | 30 |
| 47 | (United States) Roy Sherman | DNQ | | DNS | DNS | | | | | | | | | | | | 28 |
| 48 | (United States) Buzz Barton | | | | | | | | | | 10 | | | | | | 20.1 |
| 49 | (United States) Delmar Desch | | | | | | | | | 11 | | | | | | | 20 |
| 50 | (United States) George Connor | 30 | DNQ | DNS | 25 | DNQ | 12 | | DNQ | | DNQ | | | DNQ | | | 20 |
| 51 | (United States) Walt Brown | 26 | DNQ | | 10 | | | | | | | | | | | | 17 |
| 52 | (United States) Frank Armi R | DNQ | DNQ | | | | | | | | | DNQ | 17 | 12 | 16 | DNQ | 10 |
| 53 | (United States) Hugh Thomas | | | | | | | | | 12 | | | | | | | 10 |
| - | (United States) Buster Warke | | | | | | | | | | DNS | 12 | | | | | 0 |
| - | (United States) Wayne Sankey | | | | | | | | | 13 | | | | | | | 0 |
| - | (United States) Kenny Eaton | DNQ | | | 14 | | | | | | | | | | | | 0 |
| - | (United States) Tommy Hinnershitz | | | DNQ | | | | | | | 14 | | | | | | 0 |
| - | (United States) Mauri Rose | 14 | | | | | | | | | | | | | | | 0 |
| - | (United States) Glenn Harrison | | | | | | | | | 14 | | | | | | | 0 |
| - | (United States) Walt Moffatt R | | | | | | | | | 15 | | | | | | | 0 |
| - | (United States) Jimmy Jackson | | | | | | | | | 16 | | | | | | | 0 |
| - | (United States) Johnny Fedricks | | | | | | | | | | | 16 | | | | | 0 |
| - | (United States) Wayne England | | | | | | | | | 17 | | | | | | | 0 |
| - | (United States) Duke Dinsmore | 24 | | | DNQ | | 18 | | | | DNQ | DNQ | | | | | 0 |
| - | (United States) Carl Scarborough R | 18 | DNQ | DNQ | 27 | DNQ | | DNQ | DNQ | | DNQ | | DNQ | | | | 0 |
| - | (United States) Dick Fraizer | | | DNQ | 18 | | | | | | DNQ | DNQ | | | | | 0 |
| - | (United States) Roger Barlow R | | | | | | | | | 18 | | | | | | | 0 |
| - | (United States) Rex Easton R | | DNQ | | 19 | DNQ | | | | | | | | | | | 0 |
| - | (United States) D. R. Atkinson R | | | | | | | | | 19 | | | | | | | 0 |
| - | (United States) Malcolm Brazier R | | | | | | | | | 20 | | | | | | | 0 |
| - | (United States) Walt Killinger | | | | | | | | | 21 | | | DNS | | | | 0 |
| - | (United States) Phil Shafer | | | | | | | | | 21 | | | | | | | 0 |
| - | (United States) Milton Mabe | | | | | | | | | 22 | | | | | | | 0 |
| - | (United States) Buster Hammond | | | | | | | | | 23 | | | | | | | 0 |
| - | (United States) Richard DeMark R | | | | | | | | | 24 | | | | | | | 0 |
| - | (United States) Chet Miller | 25 | | | | | | | | | | | | | | | 0 |
| - | (United States) George Hammond | | | | | | | | | 25 | | | | | | | 0 |
| - | (United States) Art McKee | | | | | | | | | 26 | | | | | | | 0 |
| - | (United States) T. E. Russell | | | | | | | | | 27 | | | DNP | | | | 0 |
| - | (United States) Andy Cimino R | | | | | | | | | 28 | | | | | | | 0 |
| - | (United States) Joel Thorne | DNQ | | | | | | | | DNS | | | | | | | 0 |
| - | (United States) Clarence Doley | | | | | | | | | DNS | | | | | | | 0 |
| - | (United States) Clifford Foltz | | | | | | | | | DNS | | | | | | | 0 |
| - | (United States) Jim Hammond | | | | | | | | | DNS | | | | | | | 0 |
| - | (United States) Red Lawrence | | | | | | | | | DNS | | | | | | | 0 |
| - | (United States) Billy Ryan | | | | | | | | | DNS | | | | | | | 0 |
| - | (Canada) Ray Shadbolt | | | | | | | | | DNS | | | | | | | 0 |
| - | (United States) Curt Stockwell | | | | | | | | | DNS | | | | | | | 0 |
| - | (United States) Harry Syer | | | | | | | | | DNS | | | | | | | 0 |
| - | (United States) Doc Shanebrook | DNQ | DNQ | | DNQ | | | | | | | | | | | | 0 |
| - | (United States) Joe Barzda | DNQ | | DNQ | DNQ | | | | | | | | | | | | 0 |
| - | (United States) Dick Page | DNQ | | | | | | | | | | | | DNQ | | DNQ | 0 |
| - | (United States) Bob Scott | DNQ | | | | | | | | | | | | DNQ | | DNQ | 0 |
| - | (United States) Myron Fohr | DNQ | DNQ | | | | | | | | | | | | | | 0 |
| - | (United States) George Lynch | DNQ | | DNQ | | | | | | | | | | | | | 0 |
| - | (United States) Jud Larson | | DNQ | DNQ | | | | | | | | | | | | | 0 |
| - | (United States) Joe Sostilio | | DNQ | DNQ | | | | | | | | | | | | | 0 |
| - | (United States) Mark Light | | | DNQ | | | | | | | DNQ | | | | | | 0 |
| - | (United States) Potsy Goacher | | | | | | | DNQ | | | DNQ | | | | | | 0 |
| - | (United States) Bill Boyd | DNQ | | | | | | | | | | | | DNQ | | | 0 |
| - | (United States) Del Fanning | | | | | | | | | | | DNQ | | DNQ | | | 0 |
| - | (United States) Jimmy Bryan | DNQ | | | | | | | | | | | | | | | 0 |
| - | (United States) Bill Cantrell | DNQ | | | | | | | | | | | | | | | 0 |
| - | (United States) Jimmy Daywalt | DNQ | | | | | | | | | | | | | | | 0 |
| - | (United States) George Fonder | DNQ | | | | | | | | | | | | | | | 0 |
| - | (United States) Jackie Holmes | DNQ | | | | | | | | | | | | | | | 0 |
| - | (United States) Norm Houser | DNQ | | | | | | | | | | | | | | | 0 |
| - | (United States) Jerry Hoyt | DNQ | | | | | | | | | | | | | | | 0 |
| - | (United States) Bill Johnson | DNQ | | | | | | | | | | | | | | | 0 |
| - | (United States) Danny Kladis | DNQ | | | | | | | | | | | | | | | 0 |
| - | (United States) Bayliss Levrett | DNQ | | | | | | | | | | | | | | | 0 |
| - | (United States) Roscoe Rann | DNQ | | | | | | | | | | | | | | | 0 |
| - | (United States) Mike Salay | DNQ | | | | | | | | | | | | | | | 0 |
| - | (United States) Bud Sennett | DNQ | | | | | | | | | | | | | | | 0 |
| - | (United States) Bob Sweikert | DNQ | | | | | | | | | | | | | | | 0 |
| - | (United States) Leroy Warriner | DNQ | | | | | | | | | | | | | | | 0 |
| - | (United States) Frank Burany | | DNQ | | | | | | | | | | | | | | 0 |
| - | (United States) John Crone | | | | | DNQ | | | | | | | | | | | 0 |
| - | (United States) Bobby Barker | | | | | | | | | | DNQ | | | | | | 0 |
| - | (United States) Eddie Sachs | | | | | | | | | | DNQ | | | | | | 0 |
| - | (United States) Bill Doster | | | | | | | | | | | DNQ | | | | | 0 |
| - | (United States) Slim Roberts | | | | | | | | | | | | DNQ | | | | 0 |
| - | (United States) Dempsey Wilson | | | | | | | | | | | | | DNQ | | | 0 |
| - | (France) Jean Achard | DNP | | | | | | | | | | | | | | | 0 |
| Pos | Driver | INDY (United States) | MIL1 (United States) | LHS (United States) | DAR (United States) | SPR (United States) | MIL2 (United States) | DQSF1 (United States) | DQSF2 (United States) | PIK (United States) | SYR (United States) | MSF (United States) | CEN (United States) | SJS (United States) | ASF (United States) | BME (United States) | Pts |

| Color | Result |
|---|---|
| Gold | Winner |
| Silver | 2nd place |
| Bronze | 3rd place |
| Green | 4th & 5th place |
| Light Blue | 6th-10th place |
| Dark Blue | Finished (Outside Top 10) |
| Purple | Did not finish (Ret) |
| Red | Did not qualify (DNQ) |
| Brown | Withdrawn (Wth) |
| Black | Disqualified (DSQ) |
| White | Did not start (DNS) |
| Blank | Did not participate (DNP) |
| Blank | Not competing |

**In-line notation**
| **Bold** | Pole position |
| Italics | Ran fastest race lap |
| * | Led most race laps |
RY Rookie of the Year
R Rookie

== See also ==
- 1951 Indianapolis 500
