= 1952 AAA Championship Car season =

Sports season

- AAA National Championship Trail

Season
- Races: 12
- Start date: May 30
- End date: November 11

Awards
- National champion: (United States) Chuck Stevenson
- Indianapolis 500 winner: (United States) Troy Ruttman

The 1952 AAA Championship Car season consisted of 12 races, beginning in Speedway, Indiana on May 30 and concluding in Phoenix, Arizona on November 11. There was also one non-championship event in Mechanicsburg, Pennsylvania. The AAA National Champion was Chuck Stevenson, and the Indianapolis 500 winner was Troy Ruttman. Johnny McDowell was killed at the Milwaukee while qualifying for the Rex Mays Classic. Joe James died in the San José 100 race.

== Schedule and results ==
Rnd	Date	Race name	Track	Location	Type	Pole position	Winning driver
1	May 30	(United States) International 500 Mile Sweepstakes^{A}	Indianapolis Motor Speedway	Speedway, Indiana	Paved	(United States) Fred Agabashian	(United States) Troy Ruttman
2	June 8	(United States) Rex Mays Classic	Wisconsin State Fair Park Speedway	West Allis, Wisconsin	Dirt	(United States) Jim Rigsby	(United States) Mike Nazaruk
3	July 4	(United States) Raleigh 200	Southland Speedway	Raleigh, North Carolina	Paved	(United States) Cliff Griffith	(United States) Troy Ruttman
NC	July 27	(United States) Indianapolis Sweepstakes	Williams Grove Speedway	Mechanicsburg, Pennsylvania	Dirt	(United States) Paul Russo	(United States) Paul Russo
4	August 16	(United States) Springfield 100	Illinois State Fairgrounds	Springfield, Illinois	Dirt	(United States) Mike Nazaruk	(United States) Bill Schindler
5	August 24	(United States) Milwaukee 200	Wisconsin State Fair Park Speedway	West Allis, Wisconsin	Dirt	(United States) Bob Sweikert	(United States) Chuck Stevenson
6	August 30	(United States) Detroit 100	Michigan State Fairgrounds Speedway	Detroit, Michigan	Dirt	(United States) Jimmy Reece	(United States) Bill Vukovich
7	September 1	(United States) Ted Horn Memorial	DuQuoin State Fairgrounds	Du Quoin, Illinois	Dirt	(United States) Bill Schindler	(United States) Chuck Stevenson
8	September 1	(United States) Pikes Peak Auto Hill Climb	Pikes Peak Highway	Pikes Peak, Colorado	Hill	(United States) Al Rogers^{B}	(United States) George Hammond
9	September 6	(United States) Syracuse 100	Syracuse Mile	Syracuse, New York	Dirt	(United States) Jack McGrath	(United States) Jack McGrath
10	September 28	(United States) Denver 100	Centennial Race Track	Littleton, Colorado	Dirt	(United States) Bill Vukovich	(United States) Bill Vukovich
11	November 2	(United States) San Jose 100	San Jose Speedway	San Jose, California	Dirt	(United States) Jack McGrath	(United States) Bobby Ball
12	November 11	(United States) Phoenix 100	Arizona State Fairgrounds	Phoenix, Arizona	Dirt	(United States) Jack McGrath	(United States) Johnnie Parsons

Paved/Dirt Oval
Road Course/Hill Climb
Non-championship race

^A Indianapolis 500 was AAA-sanctioned and counted towards the 1952 FIA World Championship of Drivers title.
^B No pole is awarded for the Pikes Peak Hill Climb, in this schedule on the pole is the driver who started first. No lap led was awarded for the Pikes Peak Hill Climb, however, a lap was awarded to the drivers that completed the climb.

== Final points standings ==
Note: The points became the car, when not only one driver led the car, the relieved driver became small part of the points. Points for driver method: (the points for the finish place) / (number the lap when completed the car) * (number the lap when completed the driver)

Pos	Driver	INDY (United States)	MIL1 (United States)	RAL (United States)	SPR (United States)	MIL2 (United States)	MSF (United States)	DQSF (United States)	PIK (United States)	SYR (United States)	CEN (United States)	SJS (United States)	ASF (United States)	Pts
1	(United States) Chuck Stevenson	18	6	6	5	1	3	1		7	2	7	6	1440
2	(United States) Troy Ruttman	1	DNQ	1	12									1410
3	(United States) Sam Hanks	3	DNQ	18	3	14	DNQ	2		12	4	5	2	1390
4	(United States) Duane Carter	4		3	DNQ	3	7			DNQ	DNQ	DNS	12	1250.4
5	(United States) Jack McGrath	11	13	2	2	15	4	5		**1**	6	**4**	**16**	1200
6	(United States) Jim Rathmann	2	10	4	DNQ	DNQ		18		18	DNQ			1070
7	(United States) Paul Russo	DNQ	2	5	DNQ	6	2	4		4	18	3	15	1060
8	(United States) Bobby Ball	32	11	DNQ	15	10	9	6		3	3	1	3	820
9	(United States) Jimmy Reece R	7	5	DNQ	8	8	**15**	15		5	10	10	11	709.6
10	(United States) Henry Banks	19	DNQ	10	7	4	6	7		8	8	17	5	700
11	(United States) Bill Schindler	14	3	23	1	2	13	**14**		16				660
12	(United States) Bill Vukovich	17	DNQ	24	DNQ		1	3		14	**1**	14	8	590
13	(United States) Mike Nazaruk	DNQ	1	19	**18**	16	17	DNQ		2	12	2	18	530
14	(United States) Art Cross R	5									DNP			500
15	(United States) Jimmy Bryan R	6			DNQ							9	14	440
16	(United States) Jim Rigsby	12	**4**	8	4	13	11							410
17	(United States) Joe James	13	DNQ	20	6	5	DNS	9		9	DNS	13		364
18	(United States) Johnnie Parsons	10	DNQ	22	DNQ							16	1	350
19	(United States) Manuel Ayulo	20	8	15	16	12	10	8		15	9	12	4	320
20	(United States) Neal Carter	DNQ	DNQ	7	10		5	DNQ			7			310
21	(United States) Cliff Griffith	9	15	**11**		18	DNQ	11		DNQ	DNP			260
22	(United States) George Connor	8		21		20	DNQ	DNQ			DNP			250
23	(United States) Rodger Ward	23	DNQ	9	DNQ	7	16			13	DNQ	18	9	240
24	(United States) George Hammond								1					200
25	(United States) Louis Unser								2					160
26	(United States) Bob Scott R	29	9	13		11	DNQ	13		17	15	6	DNQ	160
27	(United States) Al Rogers								**3**					140
28	(United States) Andy Linden	33	14	16	DNQ	DNQ	8	DNQ		DNQ	DNQ	15	7	129
29	(United States) Paul Kleinschmidt R								4					120
30	(United States) Buzz Barton	DNQ	DNQ		17	19	DNQ	DNQ		DNQ	5	DNQ	13	100
31	(United States) Hugh Thomas								5					100
32	(United States) Walt Faulkner	DNQ	18	17	13	DNQ	12			DNQ	11	8	10	87
33	(United States) Don Freeland R									6	14			80
34	(United States) Shelby Hill								6					80
35	(United States) Fred Agabashian	**27**				9								80
36	(United States) Gene Hartley	28	7	DNQ	14	DNQ				DNQ				60
37	(United States) Charles Bryant								7					60
38	(United States) Keith Andrews								8		DNQ			50
39	(United States) Frank Armi				DNQ			10		DNS	17	11		50
40	(United States) Tommy Hinnershitz	DNQ			9									40
41	(United States) Art McKee								9					40
42	(United States) Roy Prosser R						18			10				30
43	(United States) Johnny Mauro	DNQ							10		DNQ			30
44	(United States) Gene Force	DNQ	DNQ	14	DNQ					11				20
45	(United States) Ebe Yoder R		DNQ	DNQ	11	DNQ	DNQ	17		DNQ				20
46	(United States) Johnny Mantz								11					20
47	(United States) Bob Sweikert R	26	12	DNQ	DNQ	**21**	DNQ	12			DNS			20
48	(United States) Danny Oakes R			12							13			20
49	(United States) Herb Bryers								12					10
-	(United States) Malcolm Brazier								13					0
-	(United States) Vic Carter R					DNQ	14							0
-	(United States) Milton Mabe								14					0
-	(United States) George Fonder	15												0
-	(United States) Norman Robinson R								15					0
-	(United States) Eddie Johnson	16	17		DNQ	17	DNQ			DNS				0
-	(United States) Red Hamilton R							DNQ			16	DNQ	17	0
-	(Canada) Allen Heath R	DNQ	16	DNQ	DNQ	DNQ					DNS		DNQ	0
-	(United States) Chuck Weyant R	DNP					DNQ	16						0
-	(United States) Wayne Sankey								16					0
-	(United States) Slim Roberts R								17					0
-	(United States) Walt Killinger								18					0
-	(United States) Bob Finney								19					0
-	(United States) Phil Shafer								20					0
-	(United States) Johnny McDowell	21	DNQ											0
-	(United States) Spider Webb	22				DNQ								0
-	(United States) Eddie Russo R				DNQ	22								0
-	(United States) Tony Bettenhausen	24	DNQ											0
-	(United States) Duke Nalon	25												0
-	(United States) Chet Miller	30												0
-	(Italy) Alberto Ascari R	31												0
-	(United States) Jud Larson	DNS	DNQ											0
-	(United States) Carl Scarborough	DNS	DNQ											0
-	(United States) Foster Campbell								DNQ		DNS			0
-	(United States) Joe Allspach										DNS			0
-	(United States) Frank Luptow	DNQ	DNQ		DNQ		DNQ							0
-	(United States) Walt Geiss			DNQ			DNQ			DNQ				0
-	(United States) Frank Tillman					DNQ		DNQ		DNQ				0
-	(United States) Dempsey Wilson								DNQ			DNQ	DNQ	0
-	(United States) Ottis Stine	DNP			DNQ					DNQ				0
-	(United States) Johnny Boyd	DNP										DNQ	DNQ	0
-	(United States) Danny Kladis	DNQ	DNQ											0
-	(United States) Bill Homeier		DNQ	DNQ										0
-	(United States) Duke Dinsmore	DNQ			DNQ									0
-	(United States) Carl Forberg	DNQ					DNQ							0
-	(United States) George Tichenor	DNQ						DNQ						0
-	(United States) Joe Barzda	DNQ								DNQ				0
-	(United States) Cal Niday							DNQ				DNQ		0
-	(United States) Johnnie Tolan	DNQ											DNQ	0
-	(United States) Don Daly								DNQ		DNP			0
-	(United States) Bill Cantrell	DNQ												0
-	(United States) Jimmy Daywalt	DNQ												0
-	(United States) Dick Fraizer	DNQ												0
-	(United States) Potsy Goacher	DNQ												0
-	(United States) Perry Grimm	DNQ												0
-	(United States) Peter Hahn	DNQ												0
-	(United States) Jackie Holmes	DNQ												0
-	(United States) Jimmy Jackson	DNQ												0
-	(United States) Bayliss Levrett	DNQ												0
-	(United States) Puffy Puffer	DNQ												0
-	(United States) Doc Shanebrook	DNQ												0
-	(United States) Bill Taylor	DNQ												0
-	(United States) Leroy Warriner	DNQ												0
-	(United States) John Crone				DNQ									0
-	(United States) Gays Biro						DNQ							0
-	(United States) Pat O'Connor							DNQ						0
-	(United States) Bill Carlson								DNQ					0
-	(United States) Guy Fields								DNQ					0
-	(United States) Jimmy Good								DNQ					0
-	(United States) Joe Grayson								DNQ					0
-	(United States) George Polster								DNQ					0
-	(United States) Pete Pusede								DNQ					0
-	(United States) T. E. Russell								DNQ					0
-	(United States) Wayne Stowbridge								DNQ					0
-	(United States) Roy Bowe										DNQ			0
-	(United States) Don Olds										DNQ			0
-	(Italy) Giuseppe Farina	Wth												0
-	(United States) Bill Boyd	DNP												0
-	(United States) Johnny Fedricks	DNP												0
-	(United States) Albert Scully	DNP												0
-	(United States) George Armstrong	DNP												0
Pos	Driver	INDY (United States)	MIL1 (United States)	RAL (United States)	SPR (United States)	MIL2 (United States)	MSF (United States)	DQSF (United States)	PIK (United States)	SYR (United States)	CEN (United States)	SJS (United States)	ASF (United States)	Pts

Color	Result
Gold	Winner
Silver	2nd place
Bronze	3rd place
Green	4th & 5th place
Light Blue	6th-10th place
Dark Blue	Finished (Outside Top 10)
Purple	Did not finish (Ret)
Red	Did not qualify (DNQ)
Brown	Withdrawn (Wth)
Black	Disqualified (DSQ)
White	Did not start (DNS)
Blank	Did not participate (DNP)
Blank	Not competing

**In-line notation**
**Bold**	Pole position
Italics	Ran fastest race lap
*	Led most race laps
RY Rookie of the Year
R Rookie

== See also ==
- 1952 Indianapolis 500
