= 1954 AAA Championship Car season =

Sports season

- AAA National Championship Trail

Season
- Races: 13
- Start date: May 30
- End date: November 14

Awards
- National champion: (United States) Jimmy Bryan
- Indianapolis 500 winner: (United States) Bill Vukovich

The 1954 AAA Championship Car season consisted of 13 races, beginning in Speedway, Indiana on May 30 and concluding in Las Vegas, Nevada on November 14. There was also one non-championship event in Mechanicsburg, Pennsylvania. The AAA National Champion was Jimmy Bryan, and the Indianapolis 500 winner was Bill Vukovich. Bob Scott was killed in the Independence Day Sweepstakes race at Darlington.

== Schedule and results ==
Rnd	Date	Race name	Track	Location	Type	Pole position	Winning driver
1	May 30	(United States) International 500 Mile Sweepstakes^{A}	Indianapolis Motor Speedway	Speedway, Indiana	Paved	(United States) Jack McGrath	(United States) Bill Vukovich
2	June 6	(United States) Rex Mays Classic	Wisconsin State Fair Park Speedway	West Allis, Wisconsin	Paved	(United States) Bill Vukovich	(United States) Chuck Stevenson
3	June 20	(United States) Langhorne 100	Langhorne Speedway	Langhorne, Pennsylvania	Dirt	(United States) Joe Sostilio	(United States) Jimmy Bryan
4	July 5	(United States) Independence Day Sweepstakes	Darlington Raceway	Darlington, South Carolina	Paved	(United States) Chuck Stevenson	(United States) Manny Ayulo
NC	July 25	(United States) Indianapolis Sweepstakes	Williams Grove Speedway	Mechanicsburg, Pennsylvania	Dirt	(United States) Jimmy Davies	(United States) Jimmy Davies
5	August 21	(United States) Springfield 100	Illinois State Fairgrounds	Springfield, Illinois	Dirt	(United States) Jiggs Peters	(United States) Jimmy Davies
6	August 29	(United States) Milwaukee 200	Wisconsin State Fair Park Speedway	West Allis, Wisconsin	Paved	(United States) Sam Hanks	(United States) Manny Ayulo
7	September 6	(United States) Ted Horn Memorial	DuQuoin State Fairgrounds	Du Quoin, Illinois	Dirt	(United States) Don Freeland	(United States) Sam Hanks
8	September 6	(United States) Pikes Peak Auto Hill Climb	Pikes Peak Highway	Pikes Peak, Colorado	Hill	(United States) Larry Crockett^{B}	(United States) Keith Andrews
9	September 11	(United States) Syracuse 100	Syracuse Mile	Syracuse, New York	Dirt	(United States) Don Freeland	(United States) Bob Sweikert
10	September 18	(United States) Hoosier Hundred	Indiana State Fairgrounds	Indianapolis, Indiana	Dirt	(United States) Manny Ayulo	(United States) Jimmy Bryan
11	October 17	(United States) Golden State 100	California State Fairgrounds	Sacramento, California	Dirt	(United States) Jack McGrath	(United States) Jimmy Bryan
12	November 7–8 ^{C}	(United States) Bobby Ball Memorial	Arizona State Fairgrounds	Phoenix, Arizona	Dirt	(United States) Shorty Templeman	(United States) Jimmy Bryan
13	November 14	(United States) Silver State Century	Las Vegas Park Speedway	Las Vegas, Nevada	Dirt	(United States) Jimmy Bryan	(United States) Jimmy Bryan

Paved/Dirt Oval
Road Course/Hill Climb
Non-championship race

^A Indianapolis 500 was USAC-sanctioned and counted towards the 1954 World Championship of Drivers title.
^B No pole is awarded for the Pikes Peak Hill Climb, in this schedule on the pole is the driver who started first. No lap led was awarded for the Pikes Peak Hill Climb, however, a lap was awarded to the drivers that completed the climb.
^C Final 65 laps completed on November 8 due to heavy dust and the rough condition of the track

== Final points standings ==
Note: The points became the car, when not only one driver led the car, the relieved driver became small part of the points. Points for driver method: (the points for the finish place) / (number the lap when completed the car) * (number the lap when completed the driver)

Pos	Driver	INDY (United States)	MIL1 (United States)	LHS (United States)	DAR (United States)	SPR (United States)	MIL2 (United States)	DQSF (United States)	PIK (United States)	SYR (United States)	ISF (United States)	CSF (United States)	ASF (United States)	LVG (United States)	Pts
1	(United States) Jimmy Bryan	2	DNS	1	3	12	3	3		4	1	1	1	**1**	2630
2	(United States) Manuel Ayulo	13	2		1	DNQ	1	DNQ		DNQ	**15**	12	2	2	1290
3	(United States) Jack McGrath	**3**	4	DNQ	21	8	DNQ	9		10	4	**2**	DNQ		1220
4	(United States) Bill Vukovich	1	**22**												1000
5	(United States) Jimmy Reece	17	3	2	2	DNQ	20	5		6	5	5	17	Wth	1000
6	(United States) Bob Sweikert	14	11	4	22	4	22	8		1	2	3	3	14	950
7	(United States) Chuck Stevenson	12	1		**29**	2	2	2							861.5
8	(United States) Sam Hanks	20	DNQ	3	8	7	**6**	1			3	15	5	DNQ	858.5
9	(United States) Mike Nazaruk	5	15	13	25	9	4	10		17	DNQ				810
10	(United States) Don Freeland	7	9	9	18	3	9	**17**		**2**	DNQ	DNS	DNQ	DNQ	760
11	(United States) Larry Crockett R	9	20	8	11	6	8		**4**	13	DNQ		15	10	620
12	(United States) Jimmy Davies	DNS	17		28	1	23	4		11	DNQ	4	DNQ	3	614.5
13	(United States) Johnnie Tolan	DNQ	12		4	10	25	DNQ		3	8	9	18	12	520
14	(United States) Fred Agabashian	6					10								460
15	(United States) Troy Ruttman	4	7		15										447
16	(United States) Andy Linden	25	21	14	26	DNS		6		7	DNQ	7	4	5	428
17	(United States) Art Cross	11			6	DNQ	5								419.5
18	(United States) Cal Niday	10	DNQ			16	DNQ		7	16	11	6	6	16	390
19	(United States) Jerry Hoyt	26	DNS		5	DNQ	DNQ	DNQ			10	16	11	DNQ	312.5
20	(United States) Duane Carter	15	19		9	DNQ	13	18			DNQ		DNQ	DNQ	293
21	(United States) Keith Andrews								1			10			230
22	(United States) Ed Elisian	18	14	12	DNS	13	11	DNQ		5	6				230
23	(United States) Rodger Ward	22	10	16	DNQ	15	26	11		18	9	13	DNQ	4	210
24	(United States) Gene Hartley	23	6			DNQ	7	12			DNQ	DNQ	DNQ	DNQ	210
25	(United States) Pat O'Connor	21	5	DNQ	10	DNQ	19	DNQ		DNQ	DNQ	DNQ	DNQ	9	200
26	(United States) Paul Russo	8													187.5
27	(United States) Jiggs Peters R					**5**	17	16		DNQ	18	8	10	DNQ	180
28	(United States) Hugh Thomas								2						160
29	(United States) Eddie Sachs	DNQ	DNQ	5	16	DNQ	DNQ				DNQ	DNQ	7		160
30	(United States) Joe Sostilio R	DNQ	13	**7**	7	DNQ	DNQ	DNQ		DNQ		DNQ			159.6
31	(United States) Bob Finney								3						140
32	(United States) Tommy Hinnershitz			DNS	19	DNQ				15	7		13	6	140
33	(United States) Johnnie Parsons	32	16		30	DNQ		7		8	16	DNQ	DNQ	DNQ	122.5
34	(United States) Johnny Boyd R		DNQ	6	14	DNS	16	DNQ		12	DNQ	11	12	13	120
35	(United States) Chuck Weyant	DNQ	DNQ			11	14	DNQ			17		9	8	110
36	(United States) Paul Kleinschmidt								5						100
37	(United States) Herb Bryers								6						80
38	(United States) Walt Faulkner	DNS	8		13										78.5
39	(United States) Rex Easton					17	24	DNQ			12			7	70
40	(United States) Shorty Templeman											DNQ	**8**	DNQ	50
41	(United States) Al Rogers								8						50
42	(United States) Len Duncan	31			DNS										47
43	(United States) Johnny Thomson	24	DNS		DNQ					9					40
44	(United States) Chuck Hulse								9						40
45	(United States) Bob Scott	DNS	18	10	20										30
46	(United States) Joe Garson								10						30
47	(United States) Ernie McCoy	16		DNS	DNS										20.4
48	(United States) Eddie Russo	DNQ	DNQ	11	17		DNQ	DNQ		DNQ					20
49	(United States) Ted Foltz R								11						20
50	(United States) Roy Prosser													11	20
51	(United States) Pat Flaherty	DNS					12	DNQ			DNQ				20
52	(United States) Gene Force				12										20
53	(United States) Shelby Hill								12						10
-	(United States) Bob Carroll R					DNS		14			13	14	DNQ	15	0
-	(United States) Danny Kladis	DNS					18	13			DNQ				0
-	(United States) Pete Woods								13						0
-	(United States) Ray Crawford R		DNQ		DNQ	18		15			14	DNQ	14		0
-	(United States) Danny Oakes	DNQ				14	DNQ	DNQ			DNQ	DNQ		18	0
-	(United States) Al Keller R									14	DNQ				0
-	(United States) Pete Pusede								14						0
-	(United States) Bill Homeier	33					15	DNQ		DNQ	DNQ	17	DNQ	DNQ	0
-	(United States) Wally Campbell R	DNQ		15	24										0
-	(United States) T. E. Russell								15						0
-	(United States) Tony Bettenhausen	29	DNQ										16	17	0
-	(United States) Malcolm Brazier								16						0
-	(United States) Frank Armi	19	DNQ	17											0
-	(United States) Johnny Mauro								17						0
-	(United States) Edgar Elder											18		DNQ	0
-	(United States) Louis Unser								18						0
-	(United States) Jimmy Daywalt	27			23		21								0
-	(United States) Jim Rathmann	28			27										0
-	(United States) Spider Webb	30													0
-	(United States) Marshall Teague	DNS	DNQ		Wth										0
-	(United States) Cliff Griffith	DNQ		DNS											0
-	(United States) George Fonder	DNS													0
-	(United States) Jimmy Jackson	DNS													0
-	(United States) Eddie Johnson	DNS													0
-	(United States) Jimmy Good								DNS						0
-	(United States) Slim Roberts								DNS						0
-	(United States) Duke Nalon	DNQ				DNQ	DNQ	DNQ					DNQ	DNQ	0
-	(United States) George Wilson					DNQ		DNQ		DNQ	DNQ		DNQ	DNQ	0
-	(United States) Leroy Warriner	Wth									DNQ		DNQ	DNQ	0
-	(United States) Curly Boyd						DNQ	DNQ			DNQ				0
-	(United States) Paul Howe					DNQ		DNQ							0
-	(United States) Al Herman	DNQ								DNQ					0
-	(United States) Colby Scroggin												DNQ	DNQ	0
-	(United States) Frank Mundy	DNQ	DNP												0
-	(United States) Jack Bates		DNP			DNQ									0
-	(United States) Henry Banks	DNQ													0
-	(United States) Bob Christie	DNQ													0
-	(United States) George Connor	DNQ													0
-	(United States) Billy Devore	DNQ													0
-	(United States) Duke Dinsmore	DNQ													0
-	(United States) Potsy Goacher	DNQ													0
-	(United States) Bill Holland	DNQ													0
-	(United States) George Tichenor	DNQ													0
-	(United States) Lee Wallard	DNQ													0
-	(United States) Bill Boyd		DNQ												0
-	(United States) Johnny Fedricks		DNQ												0
-	(United States) George Lynch							DNQ							0
-	(United States) Lloyd Axel								DNQ						0
-	(United States) Roy Bowe								DNQ						0
-	(United States) Berton Groves								DNQ						0
-	(United States) George Hammond								DNQ						0
-	(United States) Charles Lowderman								DNQ						0
-	(United States) Wayne Sankey								DNQ						0
-	(United States) Jimmy Thompson								DNQ						0
-	(United States) Elmer George										DNQ				0
-	(United States) Don Olds											DNQ			0
Pos	Driver	INDY (United States)	MIL1 (United States)	LHS (United States)	DAR (United States)	SPR (United States)	MIL2 (United States)	DQSF (United States)	PIK (United States)	SYR (United States)	ISF (United States)	CSF (United States)	ASF (United States)	LVG (United States)	Pts

Color	Result
Gold	Winner
Silver	2nd place
Bronze	3rd place
Green	4th & 5th place
Light Blue	6th-10th place
Dark Blue	Finished (Outside Top 10)
Purple	Did not finish (Ret)
Red	Did not qualify (DNQ)
Brown	Withdrawn (Wth)
Black	Disqualified (DSQ)
White	Did not start (DNS)
Blank	Did not participate (DNP)
Blank	Not competing

**In-line notation**
**Bold**	Pole position
Italics	Ran fastest race lap
*	Led most race laps
RY Rookie of the Year
R Rookie

== General references ==
- Åberg, Andreas. "AAA National Championship 1954". Driver Database. Archived from the original on October 19, 2012.
- "1954 AAA National Championship Trail". ChampCarStats.com. Archived from the original on March 8, 2012.
- Harms, Phil. "1954 Championship Driver Summary" (PDF). Motorsport.com. Archived from the original (PDF) on August 10, 2012.
- http://media.indycar.com/pdf/2011/IICS_2011_Historical_Record_Book_INT6.pdf (p. 287-290)

== See also ==
- 1954 Indianapolis 500
