= 1953 AAA Championship Car season =

Sports season

- AAA National Championship Trail

Season
- Races: 12
- Start date: May 30
- End date: November 11

Awards
- National champion: (United States) Sam Hanks
- Indianapolis 500 winner: (United States) Bill Vukovich

The 1953 AAA Championship Car season consisted of 12 races, beginning in Speedway, Indiana on May 30 and concluding in Phoenix, Arizona on November 11. There was also one non-championship event in Mechanicsburg, Pennsylvania. The AAA National Champion was Sam Hanks, and the Indianapolis 500 winner was Bill Vukovich. Chet Miller died while practicing for the Indianapolis 500.

== Schedule and results ==
Rnd	Date	Race name	Track	Location	Type	Pole position	Winning driver
1	May 30	(United States) International 500 Mile Sweepstakes^{A}	Indianapolis Motor Speedway	Speedway, Indiana	Paved	(United States) Bill Vukovich	(United States) Bill Vukovich
2	June 7	(United States) Rex Mays Classic	Wisconsin State Fair Park Speedway	West Allis, Wisconsin	Dirt	(United States) Manny Ayulo	(United States) Jack McGrath
3	June 21	(United States) Springfield 100	Illinois State Fairgrounds	Springfield, Illinois	Dirt	(United States) Don Freeland	(United States) Rodger Ward
4	July 4	(United States) Detroit 100^{B}	Michigan State Fairgrounds Speedway	Detroit, Michigan	Dirt	(United States) Duane Carter	(United States) Rodger Ward
NC	July 26	(United States) Indianapolis Sweepstakes	Williams Grove Speedway	Mechanicsburg, Pennsylvania	Dirt	(United States) Duane Carter	(United States) Jimmy Davies
5	August 22	(United States) Springfield 100	Illinois State Fairgrounds	Springfield, Illinois	Dirt	(United States) Chuck Stevenson	(United States) Sam Hanks
6	August 30	(United States) Milwaukee 200	Wisconsin State Fair Park Speedway	West Allis, Wisconsin	Dirt	(United States) Jack McGrath	(United States) Chuck Stevenson
7	September 7	(United States) Ted Horn Memorial	DuQuoin State Fairgrounds	Du Quoin, Illinois	Dirt	(United States) Mike Nazaruk	(United States) Sam Hanks
8	September 7	(United States) Pikes Peak Auto Hill Climb	Pikes Peak Highway	Pikes Peak, Colorado	Hill	(United States) Bob Finney^{C}	(United States) Louis Unser
9	September 12	(United States) Syracuse 100	Syracuse Mile	Syracuse, New York	Dirt	(United States) Bob Sweikert	(United States) Tony Bettenhausen
10	September 26	(United States) Hoosier Hundred	Indiana State Fairgrounds	Indianapolis, Indiana	Dirt	(United States) Manny Ayulo	(United States) Bob Sweikert
11	October 25	(United States) Golden State 100	California State Fairgrounds	Sacramento, California	Dirt	(United States) Mike Nazaruk	(United States) Jimmy Bryan
12	November 11	(United States) Phoenix 100	Arizona State Fairgrounds	Phoenix, Arizona	Dirt	(United States) Tony Bettenhausen	(United States) Tony Bettenhausen

Paved/Dirt Oval
Road Course/Hill Climb
Non-championship race

^A The Indianapolis 500 was AAA-sanctioned and counted towards the 1953 World Championship of Drivers.
^B 73 laps were completed. Race stopped due to flipped car. Final standings reverted to 51 laps because of red flag and work done on cars. Half points awarded.
^C No pole is awarded for the Pikes Peak Hill Climb, in this schedule on the pole is the driver who started first. No lap led was awarded for the Pikes Peak Hill Climb, however, a lap was awarded to the drivers that completed the climb.

== Final points standings ==
Note1: The points became the car, when not only one driver led the car, the relieved driver became small part of the points. Points for driver method: (the points for the finish place) / (number the lap when completed the car) * (number the lap when completed the driver)

Note2: Bob Scott was running at the finish of two races after taking over mid-event as a relief driver.

Pos	Driver	INDY (United States)	MIL1 (United States)	SPR1 (United States)	MSF (United States)	SPR2 (United States)	MIL2 (United States)	DQSF (United States)	PIK (United States)	SYR (United States)	ISF (United States)	CSF (United States)	ASF (United States)	Pts
1	(United States) Sam Hanks	3	10	2	4	1	22	1		4	5	3	3	1659.5
2	(United States) Jack McGrath	5	1	4	16	13	**4**	4		9	DNQ	10	13	1250
3	(United States) Bill Vukovich	**1**										DNQ		1000
4	(United States) Manuel Ayulo	13	**14**	DNQ	17	2	2	2		10	**2**	12	4	960
5	(United States) Paul Russo	25	4	DNQ	13	6	3	14		13	12	6	17	855
6	(United States) Art Cross	2												800
7	(United States) Don Freeland	27	16	**3**	DNQ	7	5	12		3	4	17	6	750
8	(United States) Chuck Stevenson	29	15	6	DNQ	**3**	1	9		18	DNQ	9		745
9	(United States) Jimmy Bryan	14	2	8	3	15	10	7		17	11	1	15	621.4
10	(United States) Tony Bettenhausen	9					DNS	18		1	6		**1**	596
11	(United States) Rodger Ward	16	18	1	1	17	6	DNQ		7	8	13	18	540.2
12	(United States) Jimmy Davies	10	8		15	16	12	5		16	DNS	4	7	494.2
13	(United States) Johnnie Parsons	26		DNQ	8	4	21	3		12	3	15	16	435.5
14	(United States) Duane Carter	24	9	DNQ	**7**	DNQ	17			DNQ	10	Wth	2	428.6
15	(United States) Bob Sweikert	20	17			DNQ	13	17		**8**	1	2	12	420
16	(United States) Ernie McCoy R	8	5	17	5		DNQ				DNS	DNS		401
17	(United States) Jimmy Daywalt	6						DNQ		DNQ				400
18	(United States) Bob Scott	31	DNS			9		DNQ		DNS	DNQ	5	5	328
19	(United States) Fred Agabashian	4												315
20	(United States) Cal Niday	30	6	7	9	5	19	8		DNQ	DNS	Wth		310.4
21	(United States) Jerry Hoyt	23	3	14		DNQ	20	DNQ		6	DNQ	8	9	310
22	(United States) Andy Linden	33	7	5	10	DNQ	8	11		DNQ	16	DNQ	10	263.3
23	(United States) Jimmy Reece		DNS	18		8	7	DNQ		DNQ	DNQ	7	14	245.8
24	(United States) Mike Nazaruk	21	11		6	DNQ	16	**13**		2	15	**14**		205
25	(United States) Louis Unser								1					200
26	(United States) Jim Rathmann	7												169.5
27	(United States) Keith Andrews								2					160
28	(United States) Walt Faulkner	17	DNQ	9	DNQ	18	DNS	6		DNQ	DNQ	DNP		158.4
29	(United States) Al Rogers								3					140
30	(United States) Eddie Johnson	DNS	DNQ	DNQ	DNQ	DNQ								130.5
31	(United States) Bob Finney								**4**					120
32	(United States) Pat O'Connor	DNQ	DNQ					DNQ			7		8	110
33	(United States) Eddie Russo			DNQ	11	10	11	15		11	DNQ			100.2
34	(United States) Bill Holland	15				DNQ	18			5				100
35	(United States) Hugh Thomas								5					100
36	(United States) Duke Nalon	11												100
37	(Canada) Allen Heath	DNQ	DNQ	15	2									81.6
38	(United States) Tommy Hinnershitz			10		12	9	DNQ		14				81.6
39	(United States) Walt Killinger								6					80
40	(United States) Potsy Goacher	DNQ				DNQ	DNS	DNQ			DNQ			62
41	(United States) Shelby Hill								7					60
42	(United States) Herb Bryers								8					50
43	(United States) Gene Hartley	28		DNQ	14		DNS	DNQ			17			44.8
44	(United States) Ed Elisian R							DNQ			9			40
45	(United States) Pete Pusede R								9					40
46	(United States) Chuck Weyant						DNQ	10		DNQ	14			30
47	(United States) Pete Woods								10					30
48	(United States) Rex Easton		DNQ	DNQ		DNQ					13	DNQ	11	20
49	(United States) Danny Oakes	DNQ		DNQ		11	14				DNS		DNQ	20
50	(United States) Buzz Barton	DNQ	DNQ	11	DNQ	DNQ	DNQ				DNS			20
51	(United States) Charles Lowderman R								11					20
52	(United States) Carl Scarborough	12												17.5
53	(United States) Frank Armi	DNQ										DNS		14.6
54	(United States) Bill Homeier R	DNQ	DNS	12	DNQ	DNQ	DNQ							14.5
55	(United States) Paul Kleinschmidt								12					10
56	(United States) Vic Carter		12											5.5
57	(United States) Edgar Elder R	DNQ										11	DNQ	5.4
58	(United States) Duke Dinsmore	DNS		DNQ	12		15	DNQ						5.1
-	(United States) Johnny Thomson R	32	13											0
-	(United States) Chuck Marshall R		DNQ	13		DNQ		DNQ						0
-	(United States) Malcolm Brazier								13					0
-	(United States) Johnny Fedricks	DNQ	DNQ	DNQ	18	14	DNQ	DNQ		15	DNQ			0
-	(United States) Jimmy Good								14					0
-	(United States) Chuck Hulse R								15					0
-	(United States) Spider Webb	19		16	DNQ	DNQ	DNQ			DNQ	DNS	DNP		0
-	(United States) Johnny Roberts R	DNQ	DNQ		DNQ	DNQ	DNQ	16		DNQ	DNQ			0
-	(United States) Don Olds R											16	DNQ	0
-	(United States) Norman Robinson								16					0
-	(United States) Charles Bryant								17					0
-	(United States) Eddie Sachs R	DNQ								DNQ	DNQ	18	DNQ	0
-	(United States) Leroy Warriner R	DNQ									18			0
-	(United States) Marshall Teague R	18												0
-	(United States) George Hammond								18					0
-	(United States) Joe Garson								19					0
-	(United States) Don Carlson R								20					0
-	(United States) Pat Flaherty	22												0
-	(United States) Johnny Mantz	DNS												0
-	(United States) Jackie Holmes	DNS												0
-	(United States) George Tichenor	DNQ	DNQ			DNQ					DNQ			0
-	(United States) George Wilson					DNQ	DNQ			DNQ	DNQ			0
-	(United States) Johnny Key						DNQ	DNQ			DNQ			0
-	(United States) Johnnie Tolan	DNQ		DNQ									DNQ	0
-	(United States) Bill Doster	DNQ			DNQ									0
-	(United States) Ralph Pratt					DNQ	DNQ							0
-	(United States) Joe Barzda	DNQ								DNQ				0
-	(United States) Len Duncan	DNQ								DNQ				0
-	(United States) Ottis Stine			DNQ						DNQ				0
-	(United States) Gene Force					DNQ					DNQ			0
-	(United States) Bill Taylor	DNQ										DNQ		0
-	(United States) Henry Banks	DNQ	Wth											0
-	(United States) Bill Boyd	DNQ												0
-	(United States) Billy Cantrell	DNQ												0
-	(United States) Neal Carter	DNQ												0
-	(United States) George Connor	DNQ												0
-	(United States) Ray Crawford	DNQ												0
-	(Argentina) Jorge Daponte	DNQ												0
-	(United States) John Fitch	DNQ												0
-	(United States) George Fonder	DNQ												0
-	(United States) Cliff Griffith	DNQ												0
-	(United States) Red Hamilton	DNQ												0
-	(United States) Al Herman	DNQ												0
-	(United States) Johnny Kay	DNQ												0
-	(United States) Jud Larson	DNQ												0
-	(United States) Jim Mayes	DNQ												0
-	(United States) Chet Miller	DNQ												0
-	(United States) Roy Newman	DNQ												0
-	(United States) Hal Robson	DNQ												0
-	(United States) Wayne Selser	DNQ												0
-	(United States) Joe Sostilio	DNQ												0
-	(United States) Harry Stockman	DNQ												0
-	(United States) J. Chaplin		DNQ											0
-	(United States) Gays Biro				DNQ									0
-	(United States) Paul Howe				DNQ									0
-	(United States) Johnny Hobel							DNQ						0
-	(United States) Don Daly								DNQ					0
-	(United States) R. Manual								DNQ					0
-	(United States) Bill Milliken								DNQ					0
-	(United States) Wayne Sankey								DNQ					0
-	(United States) Phil Shafer								DNQ					0
-	(United States) Art McKee								DSQ					0
-	(United States) Troy Ruttman	Wth												0
-	(United States) Ebe Yoder	Wth												0
-	(Italy) Alberto Ascari	DNP												0
-	(United States) Johnny Mauro	DNP												0
Pos	Driver	INDY (United States)	MIL1 (United States)	SPR1 (United States)	MSF (United States)	SPR2 (United States)	MIL2 (United States)	DQSF (United States)	PIK (United States)	SYR (United States)	ISF (United States)	CSF (United States)	ASF (United States)	Pts

Color	Result
Gold	Winner
Silver	2nd place
Bronze	3rd place
Green	4th & 5th place
Light Blue	6th-10th place
Dark Blue	Finished (Outside Top 10)
Purple	Did not finish (Ret)
Red	Did not qualify (DNQ)
Brown	Withdrawn (Wth)
Black	Disqualified (DSQ)
White	Did not start (DNS)
Blank	Did not participate (DNP)
Blank	Not competing

**In-line notation**
**Bold**	Pole position
Italics	Ran fastest race lap
*	Led most race laps
RY Rookie of the Year
R Rookie

== See also ==
- 1953 Indianapolis 500
