= Duke Dinsmore =

American racing driver (1913–1985)

- Born: Carlyle John Dinsmoor; April 10, 1913 Williamstown, West Virginia, U.S.
- Died: October 12, 1985 (aged 72) Port Orange, Florida, U.S.

Champ Car career
- 47+ races run over 11 years
- Best finish: 6th (1950)
- First race: 1946 Williams Grove Race #1 (Mechanicsburg)
- Last race: 1956 Milwaukee 250 (Milwaukee)
- First win: 1950 Golden State 100 (Sacramento)
Wins	Podiums	Poles
1	5	2

Formula One World Championship career
- Active years: 1950–1954, 1956
- Team(s): Kurtis Kraft, Schroeder, Ewing
- Entries: 6 (4 starts)
- Championships: 0
- Wins: 0
- Podiums: 0
- Career points: 0
- Pole positions: 0
- Fastest laps: 0
- First entry: 1950 Indianapolis 500
- Last entry: 1956 Indianapolis 500

Carlyle John Dinsmoor (April 10, 1913 – October 12, 1985) was an American racing driver who competed under the nom de course Duke Dinsmore.

Dinsmoor served in the United States Army Air Forces during the Second World War.

== World Drivers' Championship career ==
The AAA/USAC-sanctioned Indianapolis 500 was included in the FIA World Drivers' Championship from 1950 through 1960. Drivers competing at Indianapolis during those years were credited with World Drivers' Championship participation, and were eligible to score WDC points alongside those which they may have scored towards the AAA/USAC National Championship.

Dinsmoor participated in four World Drivers' Championship races at Indianapolis. His best finish was 16th place, and he scored no World Drivers' Championship points.

== Motorsports career results ==
=== Indianapolis 500 results ===
Year	Car	Start	Qual	Rank	Finish	Laps	Led	Retired
1946	45	8	123.279	12	17	82	0	Rod
1947	10	27	119.840	22	10	167	0	Flagged
1949	29	15	127.750	21	15	174	0	Radius rod
1950	69	7	131.066	15	33	10	0	Oil leak
1951	6	32	131.974	29	24	73	0	Overheating
1953	92	-	-	-	16*	10/177	0	Rear axle
1956	64	33	138.530	33	17	191	0	Flagged
Totals						697	0	

Starts	6
Poles	0
Front Row	0
Wins	0
Top 5	0
Top 10	1
Retired	4

* Shared drive with Rodger Ward and Andy Linden. Dinsmoor drove ten laps of the 177 completed by Ward (138), Linden (29) and Dinsmore.

=== AAA/USAC Championship Car results ===
Year	1	2	3	4	5	6	7	8	9	10	11	12	13	14	15	Pos	Points
1946	INDY; 17	LAN	ATL; 10	ISF; 11	MIL; 4	GOS; 3										10th	454
1947	INDY; 10	MIL; 12	LAN; 8	ATL; 11	BAI; 8	MIL; 15	GOS; 4	MIL; 11	PIK	SPR	ARL; 13					15th	345.5
1948	ARL; 2	INDY	MIL; 16	LAN	MIL	SPR	MIL	DUQ; 13	ATL	PIK	SPR	DUQ; 15				26th	172.5
1949	ARL	INDY; 15	MIL; DNP	TRE; 5	SPR; DNQ	MIL; DNS	DUQ; DNQ	PIK	SYR; DNQ	DET; 10	SPR; DNQ	LAN; 13	SAC; 14	DMR; DNQ		20th	254
1950	INDY; 33	MIL; 14	LAN; 4	SPR; 7	MIL; 4	PIK	SYR; 10	DET; 5	SPR; 11	SAC; 1	PHX; 18	BAY; 7	DAR; 5			6th	1,017
1951	INDY; 24	MIL	LAN	DAR; DNQ	SPR	MIL; 18	DUQ	DUQ	PIK	SYR; DNQ	DET; DNQ	DNC	SJS	PHX	BAY	-	0
1952	INDY; DNQ	MIL	RAL	SPR; DNQ	MIL	DET	DUQ	PIK	SYR	DNC	SJS	PHX				-	0
1953	INDY; DNS	MIL	SPR; DNQ	DET; 12	SPR	MIL; 15	DUQ; DNQ	PIK	SYR	ISF	SAC	PHX				58th	5.1
1954	INDY; DNQ	MIL	LAN	DAR	SPR	MIL	DUQ	PIK	SYR	ISF	SAC	PHX	LVG			-	0
1956	INDY; 17	MIL	LAN	DAR; DNQ	ATL	SPR	MIL; 18	DUQ	SYR; DNP	ISF	SAC	PHX				-	0
1960	TRE	INDY; DNQ	MIL	LAN	SPR	MIL	DUQ	SYR	ISF	TRE	SAC	PHX				-	0

- 1946 table only includes results of the six races run to "championship car" specifications. Points total includes the 71 races run to "big car" specifications.

=== FIA World Drivers' Championship results ===
(key)

Year	Entrant	Chassis	Engine	1	2	3	4	5	6	7	8	9	WDC	Points
1950	Brown Motors	Kurtis Kraft 2000	Offenhauser L4	GBR	MON	500; 33	SUI	BEL	FRA	ITA			NC	0
1951	Brown Motors	Schroeder	Offenhauser L4	SUI	500; 24	BEL	FRA	GBR	GER	ITA	ESP		NC	0
1952	Vulcan Tool	R Miller	R Miller	SUI	500; DNQ	BEL	FRA	GBR	GER	NED	ITA		NC	0
1953	M.A. Walker Electric	Kurtis Kraft	Offenhauser L4	ARG	500; 16 *	NED	BEL	FRA	GBR	GER	SUI	ITA	NC	0
1954	Commercial Motor Freight	Ewing	Offenhauser L4	ARG	500; DNQ	BEL	FRA	GBR	GER	SUI	ITA	ESP	NC	0
1956	Shannon's	Kurtis Kraft 500A	Offenhauser L4	ARG	MON	500; 17	BEL	FRA	GBR	GER	ITA		NC	0

* Indicates shared drive with Rodger Ward and Andy Linden.
