= Manny Ayulo =

American racing driver (1921–1955)

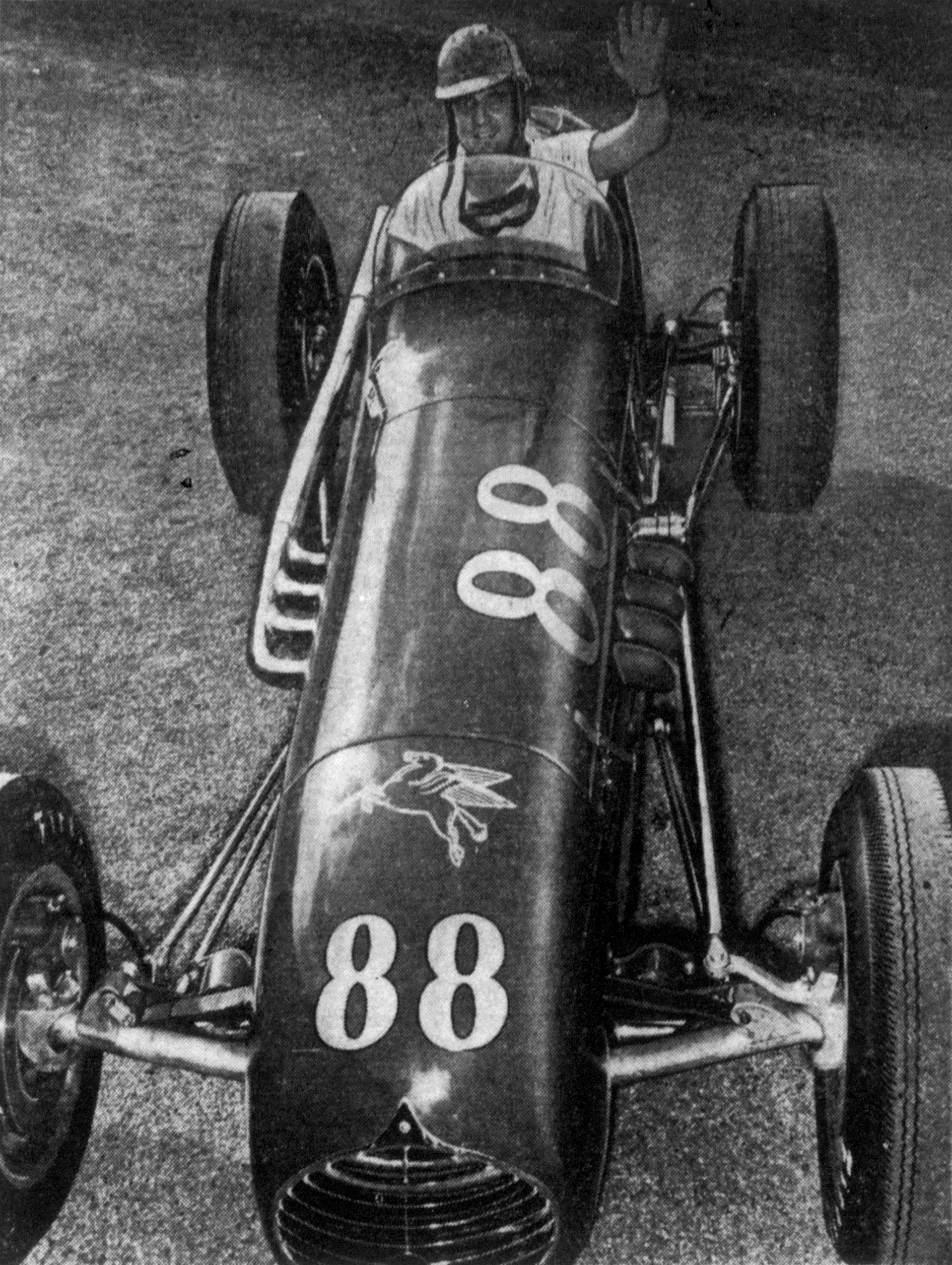
- Ayulo, circa 1953
- Born: Manuel Leaonedas Ayulo; October 20, 1921 Burbank, California, U.S.
- Died: May 17, 1955 (aged 33) Indianapolis, Indiana, U.S.

Champ Car career
- 44 races run over 8 years
- Years active: 1948–1955
- Best finish: 2nd – 1954
- First race: 1948 H. H. Wheler Memorial Cup (Arlington)
- Last race: 1954 Silver State Century (Las Vegas)
- First win: 1954 Independence Day Sweepstakes (Darlington)
- Last win: 1954 Milwaukee 200 (Milwaukee)
Wins	Podiums	Poles
2	9	3

Formula One World Championship career
- Active years: 1950–1955
- Team(s): Kuzma, Kurtis Kraft, Maserati, Lesovsky
- Entries: 6 (4 starts)
- Championships: 0
- Wins: 0
- Podiums: 1
- Career points: 2
- Pole positions: 0
- Fastest laps: 0
- First entry: 1950 Indianapolis 500
- Last entry: 1955 Indianapolis 500

Manuel Leaonedas Ayulo (October 20, 1921 – May 17, 1955) was an American racecar driver. His efforts, along with those of friend and teammate Jack McGrath, helped establish track roadsters as viable race cars. Ayulo was killed in practice for the 1955 Indianapolis 500 when his car crashed straight into a concrete wall. He was found to have not been wearing a seat belt and his pockets "were filled with wrenches".

== Racing record ==
=== Complete AAA Championship Car results ===
(key) (Races in bold indicate pole position)

Year	Team	1	2	3	4	5	6	7	8	9	10	11	12	13	14	15	Pos	Points	Ref
1948	Connie Weidell	ARL; 5	INDY; DNQ														34th	100	
1948	Bob Estes			MIL; DNQ	LAN	MIL	SPR	MIL	DUQ	ATL	PIK	SPR	DUQ				34th	100	
1949	Bill Sheffler	ARL	INDY; 28	MIL	TRE	SPR	MIL	DUQ	PIK	SYR	DET	SPR	LAN	SAC	DMR		NC	0	
1950	Bob Weinberg	INDY; DNQ	MIL	LAN	SPR	MIL	PIK	SYR; DNQ	DET	SPR	SAC	PHX; DNQ	BAY; 18	DAR; 26			NC	0	
1951	Bob Weinberg	INDY; DNQ	MIL; 10	LAN; 4	DAR; 6	SPR; 17	MIL; 17	DUQ	DUQ; 6	PIK	SYR; 12	DET; 6	DNC; 7	SJS; DNQ	PHX; 9	BAY; 11	8th	997.5	
1951	Hinkle	INDY; 3*															8th	997.5	
1952	Bob Weinberg	INDY; 20	MIL; 8	RAL; 15	SPR; 16	MIL; 12	DET; 10	DUQ; 8	PIK	SYR; 15	DNC; 9	SJS; 12					19th	320	
1952	Lutes Truck Parts												PHX; 4				19th	320	
1953	Peter Schmidt	INDY; 13	**MIL**; 14	SPR; DNQ	DET; 17	SPR; 2	MIL; 2	DUQ; 2	PIK	SYR; 10	**ISF**; 2	SAC; 12	PHX; 4				4th	960	
1954	Peter Schmidt	INDY; 13	MIL; 2	LAN	DAR; 1	SPR; DNQ	MIL; 1	DUQ; DNQ	PIK	SYR; DNQ	**ISF**; 15	SAC; 12	PHX; 2	LVG; 2			2nd	1290	
1955	Peter Schmidt	INDY; DNQ	MIL	LAN	SPR	MIL	DUQ	PIK	SYR	ISF	SAC	PHX					NC	0	

* shared drive with Jack McGrath, received 350 points.

=== Indianapolis 500 results ===
Year	Car	Start	Qual	Rank	Finish	Laps	Led	Retired
1949	52	33	125.799	33	28	24	0	Rod
1951	9	–	–	–	**3rd***	200	11	Running
1952	8	28	135.982	10	20	184	0	Flagged
1953	88	4	136.384	15	13	184	0	Rod
1954	88	22	138.164	23	13	197	0	Flagged
**Totals**						589	11	

Starts	4
Poles	0
Front Row	0
Wins	0
Top 5	1
Top 10	1
Retired	2

* shared drive with Jack McGrath.

=== Complete Formula One World Championship results ===
(key)

Year	Entrant	Chassis	Engine	1	2	3	4	5	6	7	8	9	WDC	Pts
1950	Coast Grain	Maserati V8RI	Offenhauser 4.5 L4	GBR	MON	500; DNQ	SUI	BEL	FRA	ITA			NC	0
1951	Jack Hinkle	Kurtis Kraft 3000	Offenhauser 4.5 L4	SUI	500; 3*	BEL	FRA	GBR	GER	ITA	ESP		15th	2
1952	Coast Grain	Lesovsky	Offenhauser 4.5 L4	SUI	500; 20	BEL	FRA	GBR	GER	NED	ITA		NC	0
1953	Peter Schmidt	Kuzma Indy Roadster	Offenhauser 4.5 L4	ARG	500; 13	NED	BEL	FRA	GBR	GER	SUI	ITA	NC	0
1954	Peter Schmidt	Kuzma Indy Roadster	Offenhauser 4.5 L4	ARG	500; 13	BEL	FRA	GBR	GER	SUI	ITA	ESP	NC	0
1955	Peter Schmidt	Kurtis Kraft 500C	Offenhauser 4.5 L4	ARG	MON	500; DNQ	BEL	NED	GBR	ITA			NC	0

* Indicates shared drive with Jack McGrath.

== See also ==
- List of fatalities at the Indianapolis Motor Speedway

Sporting positions
Preceded by Mario Alborghetti	Formula One fatal accidents May 17, 1955	Succeeded by Bill Vukovich
Records
Preceded by Alberto Ascari; 31 years, 312 days (1950 Monaco GP)	Youngest driver to score a podium position in Formula One; 29 years, 221 days (1951 Indianapolis 500) Shared a car with Jack McGrath (31 years, 233 days). Mike Nazaruk (29 years, 239 days) finished on podium at the same race, but single. All three were younger than the previous record-holder Ascari.	Succeeded by José Froilán González; 28 years, 269 days (1951 French GP)
Preceded by Mike Nazaruk; 29 years, 239 days (1951 Indianapolis 500)	Youngest driver to score points in Formula One; 29 years, 221 days (1951 Indianapolis 500)	Succeeded by Andy Linden; 29 years, 54 days (1951 Indianapolis 500)
