= Walt Faulkner =

American racing driver (1918–1956)

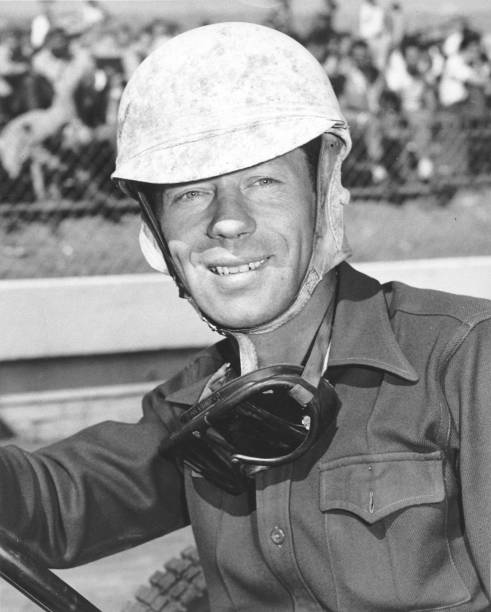
- Faulkner, circa 1948
- Born: Walter Faulkner; February 6, 1918 Tell, Texas, U.S.
- Died: April 22, 1956 (aged 38) Vallejo, California, U.S.

Champ Car career
- 35 races run over 7 years
- Years active: 1949-1955
- Best finish: 2nd – 1950
- First race: 1950 Indianapolis 500 (Indianapolis)
- Last race: 1955 Springfield 100 (Springfield)
- First win: 1950 Milwaukee 200 (Milwaukee)
- Last win: 1951 Milwaukee 200 (Milwaukee)
Wins	Podiums	Poles
3	7	1

Formula One World Championship career
- Active years: 1950 – 1955
- Team(s): Kurtis Kraft, Kuzma, Pankratz, Lesovsky, Ferrari
- Entries: 6 (5 starts)
- Championships: 0
- Wins: 0
- Podiums: 0
- Career points: 1
- Pole positions: 1
- Fastest laps: 0
- First entry: 1950 Indianapolis 500
- Last entry: 1955 Indianapolis 500

Walter Faulkner (February 6, 1918 – April 22, 1956) was an American racing driver from Tell, Texas. He moved to Milledgeville, Georgia at the age of two-and-a-half, and to Lake Wales, Florida at the age of eight. He then moved to San Diego, California in 1936. Faulkner competed mainly in the National Championship and in stock car races. In 1950 Faulkner became the first rookie to win pole position at the Indianapolis 500. He died in 1956 after a qualifying crash at a USAC Stock Car event in Vallejo, California.

Earlier in his career, Faulkner raced motorcycles, then switched to midget cars, later driving for the Edelbrock dirt track racing team. He had great success in midget car racing and was inducted into the National Midget Auto Racing Hall of Fame in 2007. Faulkner was also inducted into the West Coast Stock Car Hall of Fame in 2006.

== World Championship career summary ==
The Indianapolis 500 was part of the FIA World Championship from 1950 through 1960. Drivers competing at Indy during those years were credited with World Championship points and participation. Faulkner participated in five World Championship races. He started on the pole one time, and accumulated a total of one championship point.

== Racing record ==
=== Complete AAA Championship Car results ===
Year	1	2	3	4	5	6	7	8	9	10	11	12	13	14	15	Pos	Points
1949	ARL	INDY	MIL	TRE	SPR	MIL	DUQ	PIK	SYR	DET	SPR	LAN	SAC	DMR; DNQ		-	0
1950	INDY; 7	MIL; 7	LAN; DNQ	SPR; DNQ	MIL; 1	PIK	SYR; 2	DET; 4	SPR; 12	SAC; 9	PHX; 5	BAY; 6	DAR; 8			2nd	1,317
1951	INDY; 15	MIL	LAN	DAR; 1	SPR; DNQ	MIL; 1	DUQ; 4	DUQ; 2	PIK	SYR; 2	DET; 2	DNC; 18	SJS; DNQ	PHX; 6	BAY; DNS	3rd	1,513.6
1952	INDY; DNQ	MIL; 18	RAL; 17	SPR; 13	MIL; DNQ	DET; 12	DUQ	PIK	SYR; DNQ	DNC; 11	SJS; 8	PHX; 10				32nd	87
1953	INDY; 17	MIL; DNQ	SPR; 9	DET; DNQ	SPR; 18	MIL; DNS	DUQ; 6	PIK	SYR; DNQ	ISF; DNQ	SAC; DNP	PHX				28th	158.4
1954	INDY; DNS	MIL; 8	LAN	DAR; 13	SPR	MIL	DUQ	PIK	SYR	ISF	SAC	PHX	LVG			38th	78.5
1955	INDY; 5	MIL; 21	LAN	SPR; 16	MIL; DNQ	DUQ	PIK	SYR; DNS	ISF; DNS	SAC	PHX					10th	447.5

=== Indy 500 results ===
Year	Car	Start	Qual	Rank	Finish	Laps	Led	Retired
1950	98	1	134.343	1	7	135	0	Running
1951	2	14	136.872	1	15	123	0	Crankshaft
1953	23	14	137.117	10	17	176	0	Flagged
1954	98	–	–	–	12*	199	?	Flagged
1955	77	7	139.762	16	5**	200	0	Running
**Totals**						634	0	

Starts	4
Poles	1
Front Row	1
Wins	0
Top 5	1
Top 10	2
Retired	1

* Shared drive with Chuck Stevenson
** Shared drive with Bill Homeier. Each driver scored 1 World Championship point

=== Complete Formula One World Championship results ===
(key) (Races in bold indicate pole position; races in italics indicate fastest lap)

Year	Entrant	Chassis	Engine	1	2	3	4	5	6	7	8	9	WDC	Pts
1950	Grant Piston Ring/Agajanian	Kurtis Kraft 2000	Offenhauser 4.5 L4	GBR	MON	**500**; 7	SUI	BEL	FRA	ITA			NC	0
1951	Agajanian Grant Piston Ring	Kuzma Indy Roadster	Offenhauser 4.5 L4	SUI	500; 15	BEL	FRA	GBR	GER	ITA	ESP		NC	0
1952	Grant Piston Ring/Agajanian	Ferrari 375S	Ferrari 375 4.5 V12	SUI	500; DNQ	BEL	FRA	GBR	GER	NED	ITA		NC	0
1953	Automobile Shippers/Casaroll	Kurtis Kraft 500A	Offenhauser 4.5 L4	ARG	500; 17	NED	BEL	FRA	GBR	GER	SUI	ITA	NC	0
1954	J.C. Agajanian	Kuzma Indy Roadster	Offenhauser 4.5 L4	ARG	500; 12	BEL	FRA	GBR	GER	SUI	ITA	ESP	NC	0
1955	Merz Engineering	Kurtis Kraft 500C	Offenhauser 4.5 L4	ARG	MON	500; 5	BEL	NED	GBR	ITA			23rd	1

Records
Preceded by Juan Manuel Fangio; 38 years, 331 days (1950 Monaco Grand Prix)	Youngest Grand Prix polesitter 30 years, 103 days (1950 Indianapolis 500)	Succeeded by José Froilán González; 28 years, 282 days (1951 British Grand Prix)
