= Bobby Ball (racing driver) =

American racing driver (1925–1954)

- Born: Robert Kay Ball; August 26, 1925 Phoenix, Arizona, U.S.
- Died: February 27, 1954 (aged 28) Phoenix, Arizona, U.S.

Champ Car career
- 17 races run over 3 years
- Years active: 1950–1952
- Best finish: 8th – 1952
- First race: 1950 Phoenix 100 (ASF)
- Last race: 1952 Phoenix 100 (ASF)
- First win: 1952 San Jose 100 (San Jose)
Wins	Podiums	Poles
1	4	1

Formula One World Championship career
- Active years: 1951–1952
- Team(s): Schroeder, Stevens
- Entries: 2
- Championships: 0
- Wins: 0
- Podiums: 0
- Career points: 2
- Pole positions: 0
- Fastest laps: 0
- First entry: 1951 Indianapolis 500
- Last entry: 1952 Indianapolis 500

Robert Kay Ball (August 26, 1925 – February 27, 1954) was an American racing driver.

== Early life ==
Ball's parents divorced when he was a year old. He was raised by his grandmother, who enrolled him in a military academy as a teenager in an attempt to take his mind off cars and motorcycles.

== Racing career ==
Ball began racing with the Arizona Roadster Association, subsequently switching from roadsters to midgets. He won the Arizona State Midget Association (ASMA) championship in 1949 and 1950. He finished fifth in the 1951 Indianapolis 500, and 32nd in the 1952 Indianapolis 500.

Ball won the AAA Championship race at San Jose in November 1952. On January 4, 1953, he was involved in an accident at Carrell Speedway in Los Angeles which left him with terrible head injuries. Ball remained in a coma, first at the UCLA Medical Center and then at home in Phoenix, but died 14 months later of an infection.

== Bobby Ball Memorial ==
For many years, one of the two championship races held at Phoenix International Raceway was a memorial race dedicated to Ball. The Bobby Ball Memorial was first run in the fall of 1954 and 1955 as a 100-mile race on dirt, sanctioned by AAA at the Arizona State Fairgrounds. Driver Jack McGrath was killed in an accident during the 1955 race. Starting in 1956, the race was sanctioned by USAC, and continued as a 100-mile contest at the fairgrounds through its 1963 edition. In 1964, the race moved to the newly opened Phoenix International Raceway and was run at a distance of 200 miles. It continued as a 200-mile race through the 1969 edition, then was run at a 150-mile distance starting with the 1970 edition, which was won by Swede Savage. The October 1971 edition was won by A. J. Foyt, after which, the race was renamed through sponsorship from Best Western for its 1972 edition. Bobby Ball naming returned for the 1976–1978 editions, the last of which was title sponsored by Miller High Life.

== Racing record ==
=== Complete AAA Championship Car results ===
(key) (Races in bold indicate pole position)

Year	Team	1	2	3	4	5	6	7	8	9	10	11	12	13	14	15	Pos	Points	Ref
1950	Emmett Malloy	INDY	MIL	LAN	SPR	MIL	PIK	SYR	DET	SPR	SAC	**PHX**; 15	BAY; 12	DAR; DNQ			**49th**	**15**	
1951	McDaniel	INDY; 5	MIL; DNQ	LAN	DAR	SPR	MIL	DUQ	DUQ	PIK	SYR	DET	DNC; 5	SJS; 11			**13th**	**620**	
1951	Hart Fullerton														PHX; 15	BAY; 13	**13th**	**620**	
1952	McDaniel	INDY; DNQ	MIL; 11	RAL; DNQ	SPR; 15	MIL; 10	DET; 9	DUQ; 6	PIK	SYR; 3	DNC; 3	SJS; 1	PHX; 3				**8th**	**820**	
1952	Ansted	INDY; 32															**8th**	**820**	

=== Indianapolis 500 results ===
Year	Car	Start	Qual	Rank	Finish	Laps	Led	Retired
1951	52	29	134.098	9	5	200	0	Running
1952	55	17	134.725	23	32	34	0	Gear case
**Totals**						234	0	

Starts	2
Poles	0
Front Row	0
Wins	0
Top 5	1
Top 10	1
Retired	1

=== Complete Formula One World Championship results ===
(key)

Year	Entrant	Chassis	Engine	1	2	3	4	5	6	7	8	WDC	Points
1951	John McDaniel	Schroeder	Offenhauser L4	SUI	500; 5	BEL	FRA	GBR	GER	ITA	ESP	19th	2
1952	Ansted Rotary	Stevens	Offenhauser L4	SUI	500; 32	BEL	FRA	GBR	GER	NED	ITA	NC	0

Records
Preceded by Andy Linden; 29 years, 54 days (1950 Indianapolis 500)	Youngest driver to score points in Formula One; 25 years, 276 days (1951 Indianapolis 500)	Succeeded by Troy Ruttman; 22 years, 80 days (1952 Indianapolis 500)
