= Frank Armi =

American racing driver

- Born: October 12, 1918; Portland, Oregon, U.S.
- Died: November 28, 1992 (aged 74); Watsonville, California, U.S.

Formula One World Championship career
- Nationality: (United States) American
- Active years: 1951, 1953–1954
- Team(s): Kurtis Kraft, Bardazon
- Entries: 3 (1 start)
- Championships: 0
- Wins: 0
- Podiums: 0
- Career points: 0
- Pole positions: 0
- Fastest laps: 0
- First entry: 1951 Indianapolis 500
- Last entry: 1954 Indianapolis 500

Frank Simon Armi Jr (October 12, 1918 – November 28, 1992) was an American racing driver. Armi's racing career ended in the mid-1960s, when he became a television and film sound engineer, specialising in the role of sound technician, including the film The 3rd Voice, starring Edmond O'Brien and Julie London.

Armi worked for Universal Pictures for over twenty-five years. He also served in World War II and ran an auto parts shop.

== Racing record ==
=== Complete AAA Championship Car results ===
(key) (Races in bold indicate pole position)

Year	Team	1	2	3	4	5	6	7	8	9	10	11	12	13	14	15	Pos	Points	Ref
1950	Ross Page	INDY	MIL	LAN	SPR	MIL	PIK	SYR	DET	SPR	SAC	PHX	BAY; DNQ	DAR			NC	0	
1951		INDY; DNQ															53rd	10	
1951	Bardahl Oil Company		MIL; DNQ	LAN	DAR	SPR	MIL	DUQ	DUQ	PIK	SYR						53rd	10	
1951	Ralph Miller											DET; DNQ					53rd	10	
1951	L & E												DNC; 17	SJS; 12	PHX; 16	BAY; DNQ	53rd	10	
1952	Joe Shaheen	INDY	MIL	RAL	SPR; DNQ	MIL	DET										38th	50	
1952	Karl Hall							DUQ; 10	PIK								38th	50	
1952	Lee Elkins									SYR; DNQ	DNC; 17	SJS; 11	PHX				38th	50	
1953	Mel Wiggers	INDY; DNQ	MIL	SPR	DET	SPR	MIL	DUQ	PIK	SYR	ISF	SAC	PHX				NC	O	
1954	Martin Brothers	INDY; 19	MIL; DNQ	LAN; 17	DAR	SPR	MIL	DUQ	PIK	SYR	ISF	SAC	PHX	LVG			NC	0	

=== Indianapolis 500 results ===
Year	Car	Start	Qual	Rank	Finish	Laps	Led	Retired
1954	71	33	137.673	33	19	193	0	Flagged
**Totals**						193	0	

Starts	1
Poles	0
Front Row	0
Wins	0
Top 5	0
Top 10	0
Retired	0

=== Complete Formula One World Championship results ===
(key)

Year	Entrant	Chassis	Engine	1	2	3	4	5	6	7	8	9	WDC	Points
1951	Hancock Dome	Bardazon	Offenhauser L4	SUI	500; DNQ	BEL	FRA	GBR	GER	ITA	ESP		NC	0
1953	Mel-Rae/Mel Wiggers	Kurtis Kraft 4000	Offenhauser L4	ARG	500; DNQ	NED	BEL	FRA	GBR	GER	SUI	ITA	NC	0
1954	T.W. & W.T. Martin	Kurtis Kraft	Offenhauser L4	ARG	500; 19	BEL	FRA	GBR	GER	SUI	ITA	ESP	NC	0
