= Paul Russo =

American racing driver (1914–1976)

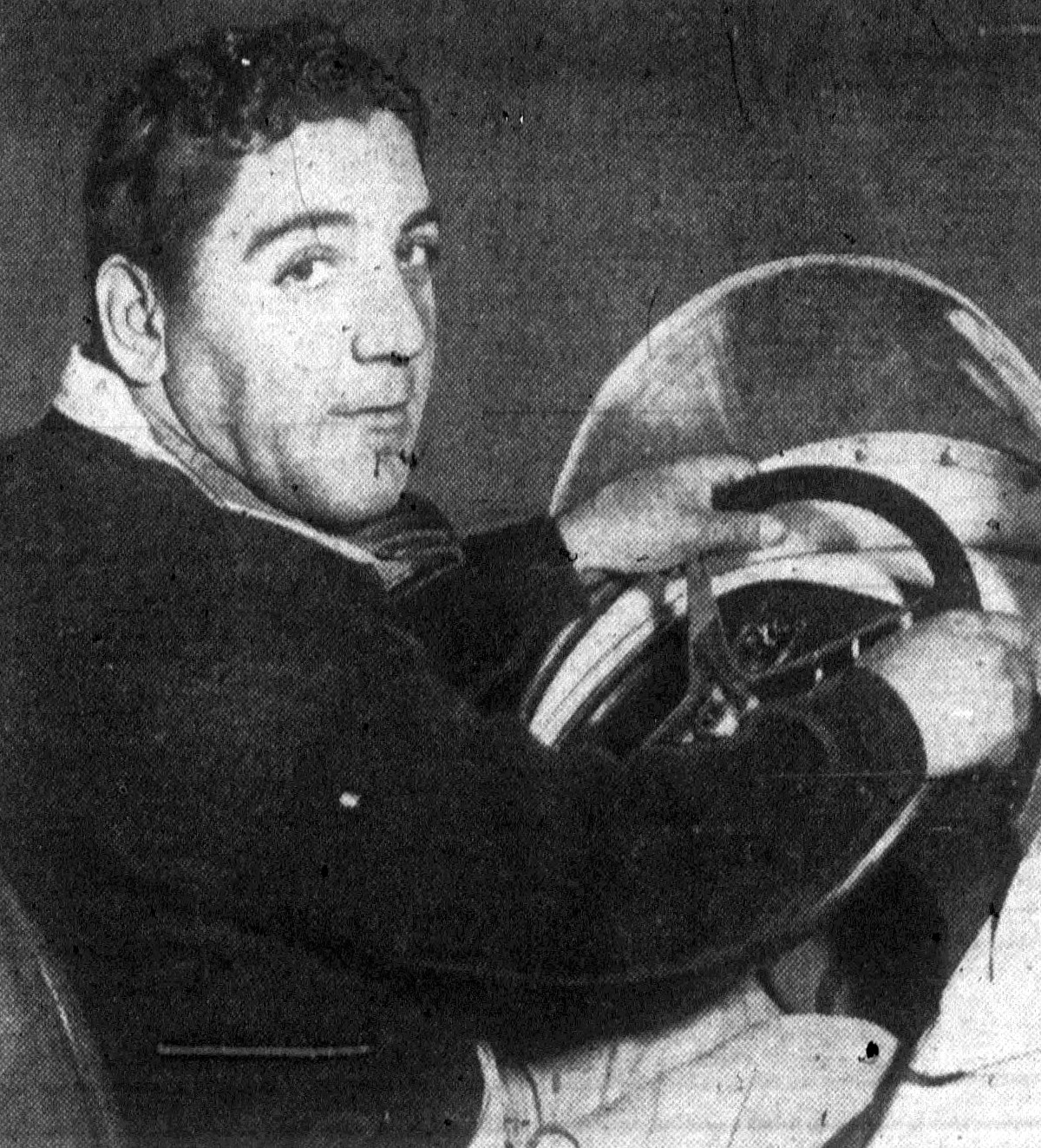
- Russo, circa 1947
- Born: Paul Frank Russo; April 10, 1914 Kenosha, Wisconsin, U.S.
- Died: February 13, 1976 (aged 61) Clearwater, Florida, U.S.

Champ Car career
- 81 races run over 22 years
- Best finish: 5th (1953)
- First race: 1940 Indianapolis 500 (Indianapolis)
- Last race: 1962 Indianapolis 500 (Indianapolis)
- First win: 1950 Springfield 100 (Springfield)
- Last win: 1951 Detroit 100 (Detroit)
| Wins | Podiums | Poles |
|---|---|---|
| 2 | 15 | 4 |

Formula One World Championship career
- Active years: 1950–1960
- Team(s): Nichels, Kurtis Kraft
- Entries: 11 (8 starts)
- Championships: 0
- Wins: 0
- Podiums: 1
- Career points: 8.5
- Pole positions: 0
- Fastest laps: 1
- First entry: 1950 Indianapolis 500
- Last entry: 1960 Indianapolis 500

Paul Frank Russo (April 10, 1914 – February 13, 1976) was an American racing driver.

== Racing career ==
=== Midget car career ===
Russo started racing midget cars in 1934. He went with a contingent of midget-car drivers to Hawaii in the winter of 1934–35. He was the 1938 AAA Eastern Midget Champion. Russo won the first race held at the Nutley Velodrome in New Jersey in 1938.

Russo was part of midget racing's "Chicago Gang" with Emil Andres, Tony Bettenhausen, Duke Nalon, Cowboy O'Rourke, Jimmy Snyder, and Wally Zale. These racers toured tracks in the Midwest and East Coast of the United States.

=== Indy car career ===
Russo drove in the AAA and USAC Championship Car series, racing in the 1940–1941, 1946–1954, 1956–1959, and 1962 seasons with 81 starts, including the Indianapolis 500 every year excluding 1951 and 1952. He finished in the top-ten 49 times, with two victories: at Springfield (1950) and Detroit (1951). He also won a non-points race at Williams Grove (1952). Russo's best finish in the Indianapolis 500 was fourth, in 1957 when he was at the wheel of a Novi Special. In 1955, Russo co-drove with Tony Bettenhausen to a second-place finish.

Russo's brother Joe and nephew Eddie also competed in Championship Car.

=== World Drivers' Championship career ===
The AAA/USAC-sanctioned Indianapolis 500 was included in the FIA World Drivers' Championship from 1950 through 1960. Drivers competing at Indianapolis during those years were credited with World Drivers' Championship participation, and were eligible to score WDC points alongside those which they may have scored towards the AAA/USAC National Championship.

Russo participated in eight World Drivers' Championship races at Indianapolis. He finished in the top-three once, and set one fastest leader lap. He scored eight and one-half World Drivers' Championship points.

== Death ==
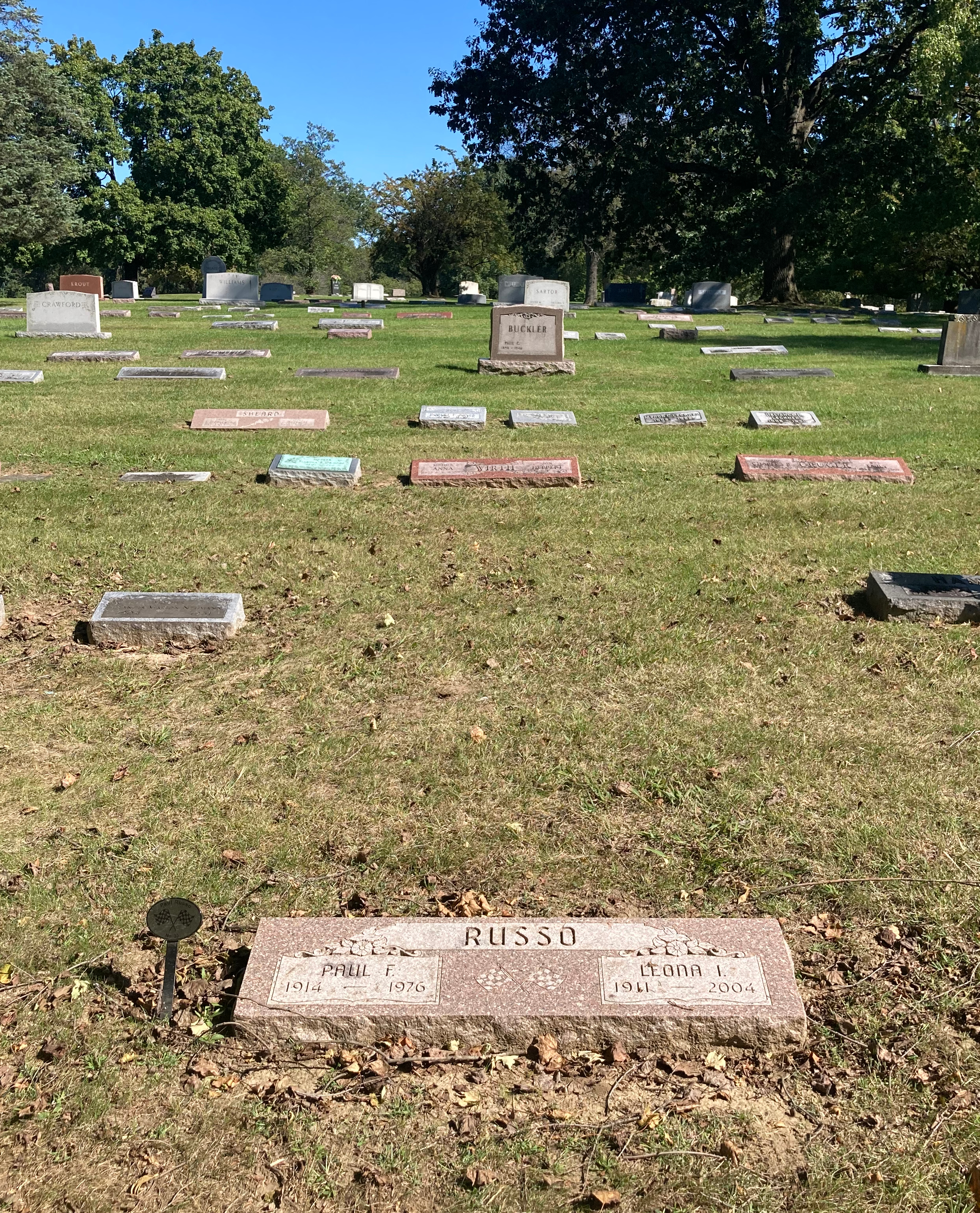
Russo's grave at Crown Hill Cemetery

On February 13, 1976, Russo died off the coast of Clearwater while in Florida for the Daytona 500. Russo is buried at Crown Hill Cemetery and Arboretum in Indianapolis, Indiana. Section 78, Lot 83 Lat:39.8234342 Long:-86.1725236

== Awards and honors ==
- Russo was inducted in the National Midget Auto Racing Hall of Fame in 1992.

== Motorsports career results ==
=== AAA/USAC Championship Car results ===
| Year | 1 | 2 | 3 | 4 | 5 | 6 | 7 | 8 | 9 | 10 | 11 | 12 | 13 | 14 | 15 | 16 | 17 | 18 | Pos | Points |
|---|---|---|---|---|---|---|---|---|---|---|---|---|---|---|---|---|---|---|---|---|
| 1946 | INDY; 33 | LAN | ATL | ISF | MIL | GOS | | | | | | | | | | | | | - | 0 |
| 1947 | INDY; 28 | MIL; 3 | LAN; 17 | ATL; 8 | BAI; 12 | MIL; 3 | GOS | MIL; 6 | PIK | SPR; 14 | ARL; 2 | | | | | | | | 10th | 545 |
| 1948 | ARL; 7 | INDY; 32 | MIL; 18 | LAN; 18 | MIL | SPR | MIL; 9 | DUQ; 18 | ATL; 11 | PIK | SPR; 15 | DUQ; 2 | | | | | | | 17th | 300 |
| 1949 | ARL | INDY; 8 | MIL; 6 | TRE; 8 | SPR; 10 | MIL; 12 | DUQ; 6 | PIK | SYR; 2 | DET; DNQ | SPR; 15 | LAN; 4 | SAC; 10 | DMR; 5 | | | | | 7th | 920 |
| 1950 | INDY; 9 | MIL; 2 | LAN; 12 | SPR; 1 | MIL; 5 | PIK | SYR; 3 | DET; 18 | SPR; 6 | SAC; 13 | PHX; 16 | BAY | DAR | | | | | | 7th | 928 |
| 1951 | INDY; DNQ | MIL; 4 | LAN | DAR; 13 | SPR; 14 | MIL; 9 | DUQ; 3 | DUQ | PIK | SYR; 15 | DET; 1 | DNC; 13 | SJS; 2 | PHX; DNQ | BAY; 16 | | | | 10th | 700 |
| 1952 | INDY; DNQ | MIL; 2 | RAL; 5 | SPR; DNQ | MIL; 6 | DET; 2 | DUQ; 4 | PIK | SYR; 4 | DNC; 18 | SJS; 3 | PHX; 15 | | | | | | | 7th | 1,060 |
| 1953 | INDY; 25 | MIL; 4 | SPR; DNQ | DET; 13 | SPR; 6 | MIL; 3 | DUQ; 14 | PIK | SYR; 13 | ISF; 12 | SAC; 6 | PHX; 17 | | | | | | | 5th | 855 |
| 1954 | INDY; 8 | MIL | LAN | DAR | SPR | MIL | DUQ | PIK | SYR | ISF | SAC | PHX | LVG | | | | | | 26th | 187.5 |
| 1955 | INDY; DNS* | MIL | LAN | SPR | MIL | DUQ | PIK | SYR | ISF | SAC | PHX | | | | | | | | 16th | 300 |
| 1956 | INDY; 33 | MIL | LAN | DAR | ATL | SPR | MIL | DUQ | SYR | ISF | SAC | PHX | | | | | | | - | 0 |
| 1957 | INDY; 4 | LAN | MIL | DET | ATL | SPR | MIL | DUQ | SYR | ISF | TRE | SAC | PHX | | | | | | 13th | 600 |
| 1958 | TRE | INDY; 18 | MIL | LAN | ATL | SPR | MIL | DUQ | SYR; 8 | ISF; 14 | TRE | SAC | PHX | | | | | | 32nd | 50 |
| 1959 | DAY; DNQ | TRE | INDY; 9 | MIL; DNQ | LAN | SPR | MIL; DNQ | DUQ | SYR | ISF | TRE | SAC | PHX | | | | | | 27th | 200 |
| 1960 | TRE | INDY; DNQ | MIL | LAN | SPR; DNQ | MIL | DUQ; DNQ | SYR | ISF | TRE | SAC | PHX | | | | | | | - | 0 |
| 1961 | TRE | INDY; DNQ | MIL | LAN | MIL | SPR | DUQ | SYR | ISF | TRE | SAC | PHX | | | | | | | - | 0 |
| 1962 | TRE | INDY; 28 | MIL; DNQ | LAN | TRE | SPR | MIL | LAN | SYR | ISF | TRE | SAC | PHX | | | | | | - | 0 |
| 1963 | TRE | INDY; DNQ | MIL; DNQ | LAN | TRE | SPR | MIL | DUQ | ISF | TRE | SAC | PHX | | | | | | | - | 0 |
| 1964 | PHX | TRE | INDY; DNQ | MIL | LAN | TRE | SPR | MIL | DUQ | ISF | TRE | SAC | PHX | | | | | | - | 0 |
| 1965 | PHX | TRE | INDY; DNQ | MIL | LAN | PIP | TRE | IRP | ATL | LAN | MIL | SPR | MIL | DUQ | ISF | TRE | SAC | PHX | - | 0 |

- 1946 table only includes results of the six races run to "championship car" specifications. Points total includes the 71 races run to "big car" specifications.

=== Indianapolis 500 results ===
| Year | Car | Start | Qual | Rank | Finish | Laps | Led | Retired |
|---|---|---|---|---|---|---|---|---|
| 1940 | 38 | 29 | 120.809 | 29 | 28 | 48 | 0 | Oil leak |
| 1941 | 45 | 18 | 125.217 | 5 | 9 | 200 | 0 | Running |
| 1946 | 10 | 2 | 126.183 | 4 | 33 | 16 | 0 | Crash T3 |
| 1947 | 15 | 21 | 123.967 | 8 | 28 | 24 | 0 | Crash FS |
| 1948 | 25 | 25 | 122.595 | 29 | 32 | 7 | 0 | Oil leak |
| 1949 | 19 | 19 | 129.487 | 5 | 8 | 200 | 0 | Running |
| 1950 | 7 | 19 | 130.790 | 18 | 9 | 135 | 0 | Running |
| 1953 | 7 | 17 | 136.219 | 16 | 25 | 89 | 0 | Magneto |
| 1954 | 5 | 32 | 137.678 | 32 | 8 | 200 | 0 | Running |
| 1955* | 10 | - | - | - | 2 | 77 | 0 | Running |
| 1956 | 29 | 8 | 143.546 | 10 | 33 | 21 | 11 | Crash T1 |
| 1957 | 54 | 10 | 144.817 | 1st | 4 | 200 | 24 | Running |
| 1958 | 15 | 14 | 142.959 | 18 | 18 | 122 | 0 | Radiator |
| 1959 | 45 | 27 | 142.383 | 22 | 9 | 200 | 0 | Running |
| 1962 | 62 | 14 | 146.687 | 20 | 28 | 20 | 0 | Piston |
| Totals | | | | | | 1559 | 35 | |

| Starts | 14 |
| Poles | 0 |
| Front Row | 1 |
| Wins | 0 |
| Top 5 | 1 |
| Top 10 | 6 |
| Retired | 8 |

* shared drive with Tony Bettenhausen
