= 1951 Indianapolis 500 =

American motor race

35th Indianapolis 500
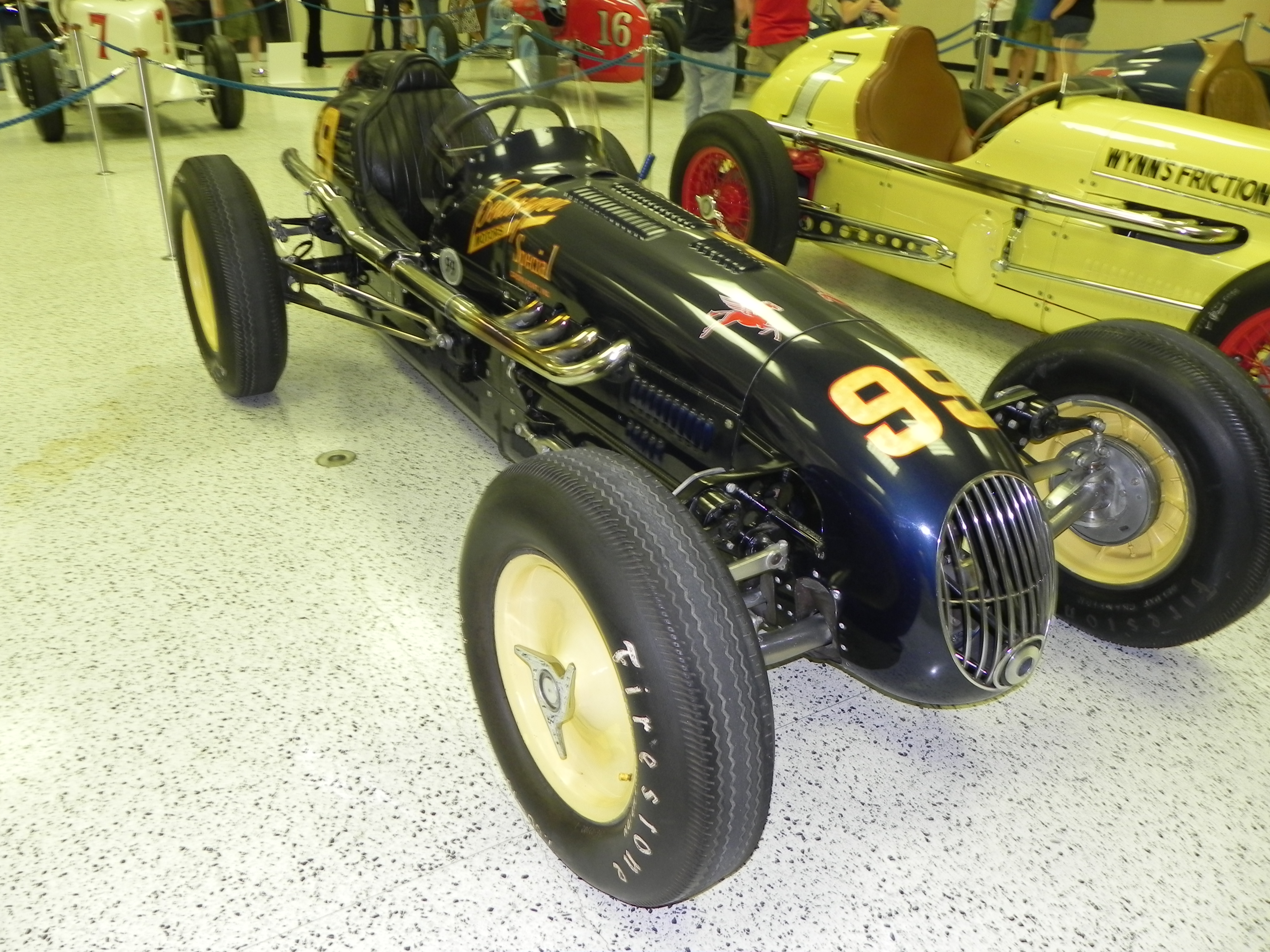

Indianapolis Motor Speedway

Indianapolis 500
- Sanctioning body: AAA
- Date: May 30, 1951
- Winner: Lee Wallard
- Winning Entrant: Murrell Belanger
- Winning Chief Mechanic: George Salih
- Winning time: 3:57:38.05
- Average speed: 126.244 mph (203.170 km/h)
- Pole position: Duke Nalon
- Pole speed: 136.498 mph (219.672 km/h)
- Most laps led: Lee Wallard (159)

Pre-race
- Pace car: Chrysler New Yorker
- Pace car driver: David A. Wallace
- Starter: Seth Klein
- Honorary referee: Clarence S. Beesemyer
- Estimated attendance: 150,000

Chronology
Previous	Next
1950	1952

The 35th International 500-Mile Sweepstakes was held at the Indianapolis Motor Speedway on Wednesday, May 30, 1951. The event was part of the 1951 AAA National Championship Trail, and was also race 2 of 8 in the 1951 World Championship of Drivers. For the second year in a row, no European Formula One-based teams entered the race.

Duke Nalon, who had suffered serious burns in a crash in 1949, and who missed the 1950 race, made a comeback at Indy by winning the pole position in a Novi. Heavy attrition saw only eight cars running at the finish. Winner Lee Wallard's car lost its brakes, suffered a damaged exhaust pipe, and broke a shock absorber mounting. In addition to the unbearably uncomfortable ride, Wallard had worn a fire retardant outfit, created by dipping his uniform in a mixture of borax crystals and water. Due to not wearing an undershirt, Wallard suffered serious chafing, and required treatment at the infield hospital after the victory lane celebration. It was estimated he lost 15 pounds during the race.

Wallard's winning car had the smallest displacement in the field. About a week after winning the race, Wallard suffered severe burns in a crash at Reading, which effectively ended his professional racing career. Three-time winner Mauri Rose, in his 15th Indy start, crashed and flipped on lap 126. It was his final 500, as he retired from driving after the crash.

Wallard's improbable victory helped earn him the nickname "Cinderella Man".

== Time trials ==
Time trials were scheduled for six days. Rain, however, pushed qualifying into a seventh day.

- Saturday May 12 – Pole Day time trials
- Sunday May 13 – Second day time trials
- Saturday May 19 – Third day time trials
- Sunday May 20 – Fourth day time trials
- Saturday May 26 – Fifth day time trials
- Sunday May 27 – Sixth day time trials (rained out)
- Monday May 28 – Seventh day time trials (rain makeup day)

== Starting grid ==
Row	Inside		Middle		Outside	
1	18	(United States) Duke Nalon	99	(United States) Lee Wallard	9	(United States) Jack McGrath
2	27	(United States) Duane Carter	16	(United States) Mauri Rose W	98	(United States) Troy Ruttman
3	83	(United States) Mike Nazaruk R	3	(United States) Johnnie Parsons W	5	(United States) Tony Bettenhausen
4	4	(United States) Cecil Green	59	(United States) Fred Agabashian	25	(United States) Sam Hanks
5	44	(United States) Walt Brown	2	(United States) Walt Faulkner	73	(United States) Carl Scarborough R
6	10	(United States) Bill Schindler	1	(United States) Henry Banks	23	(United States) Cliff Griffith R
7	8	(United States) Chuck Stevenson R	81	(United States) Bill Vukovich R	22	(United States) George Connor
8	69	(United States) Gene Force R	19	(United States) Mack Hellings	68	(United States) Carl Forberg R
9	48	(United States) Rodger Ward R	12	(United States) Johnny McDowell	76	(United States) Jimmy Davies
10	32	(United States) Chet Miller	52	(United States) Bobby Ball R	26	(United States) Joe James R
11	57	(United States) Andy Linden R	6	(United States) Duke Dinsmore	71	(United States) Bill Mackey R

R Indianapolis 500 rookie
W Indianapolis 500 winner

=== Alternates ===
- First alternate: Bob Sweikert R (#37)

=== Failed to qualify ===
All drivers from the United States unless otherwise stated.

- Jean Achard (France) (real name – Jean-Jacques Grosman) (R) (#100) — Did not appear
- Frank Armi R (#35, #58, #64)
- Manny Ayulo (#31)
- Joe Barzda R (#49)
- Bill Boyd R (#42)
- Jimmy Bryan R (#72)
- Bill Cantrell (#62, #79)
- Jimmy Daywalt R (#33, #47)
- Kenny Eaton R (#66)
- Myron Fohr (#56)
- George Fonder (#29, #53, #63)
- Potsy Goacher R (#45)
- Jackie Holmes (#24, #45)
- Norm Houser (#61)
- Jerry Hoyt (#14)
- Bill Johnson R (#15)
- Danny Kladis (#89)
- Ray Knepper R (#78)
- Bayliss Levrett (#46)
- Mark Light R (#33)
- George Lynch (#36)
- Dick Page R (#64)
- Roscoe Rann R (#14)
- Gordon Reid R (#67)
- Paul Russo (#7)
- Mike Salay (#41)
- Bob Scott R (#82)
- Bud Sennett R (#51)
- Doc Shanebrook R (#77)
- Roy Sherman R (#57)
- Joel Thorne (#88)
- Johnnie Tolan R (#34)
- Leroy Warriner R (#75)

== Box score ==
Finish	Grid	No.	Driver	Constructor	Qualifying		Laps	Time/Retired	Points	
Finish	Grid	No.	Driver	Constructor	Speed	Rank	Laps	Time/Retired	USAC	WDC
1	2	99	(United States) Lee Wallard	Kurtis Kraft-Offenhauser	135.03	5	200	126.244 mph	1,000	9^{1}
2	7	83	(United States) Mike Nazaruk R	Kurtis Kraft-Offenhauser	132.18	26	200	+1:47.24	800	6
3	3	9	(United States) Jack McGrath (Laps 1–100) (United States) Manny Ayulo (Laps 101–200)	Kurtis Kraft-Offenhauser	134.30	8	200	+2:51.39	350; 350	2; 2
4	31	57	(United States) Andy Linden R	Sherman-Offenhauser	132.22	25	200	+4:40.12	600	3
5	29	52	(United States) Bobby Ball R	Schroeder-Offenhauser	134.09	9	200	+4:52.23	500	2
6	17	1	(United States) Henry Banks	Moore-Offenhauser	133.89	12	200	+5:40.02	400	
7	24	68	(United States) Carl Forberg R	Kurtis Kraft-Offenhauser	132.89	22	193	-7 Laps	300	
8	4	27	(United States) Duane Carter	Diedt-Offenhauser	133.74	15	180	-20 Laps	250	
9	9	5	(United States) Tony Bettenhausen	Diedt-Offenhauser	131.95	29	178	Spun Off	200	
10	1	18	(United States) Duke Nalon	Kurtis Kraft-Novi	136.49	2	151	Retirement	150	
11	22	69	(United States) Gene Force R	Kurtis Kraft-Offenhauser	133.10	20	142	Engine	100	
12	12	25	(United States) Sam Hanks	Kurtis Kraft-Offenhauser	132.99	21	135	Engine	50	
13	16	10	(United States) Bill Schindler	Kurtis Kraft-Offenhauser	134.03	11	129	Engine		
14	5	16	(United States) Mauri Rose W	Diedt-Offenhauser	133.42	18	126	Accident		
15	14	2	(United States) Walt Faulkner	Kuzma-Offenhauser	136.87	1	123	Engine		
16	27	76	(United States) Jimmy Davies	Pawl-Offenhauser	133.51	17	110	Axle		
17	11	59	(United States) Fred Agabashian	Kurtis Kraft-Offenhauser	135.02	6	109	Clutch		
18	15	73	(United States) Carl Scarborough R	Kurtis Kraft-Offenhauser	135.61	4	100	Fire		
19	33	71	(United States) Bill Mackey R	Stevens-Offenhauser	131.47	32	97	Clutch		
20	19	8	(United States) Chuck Stevenson R	Marchese-Offenhauser	133.76	14	93	Fire		
21	8	3	(United States) Johnnie Parsons W	Kurtis Kraft-Offenhauser	132.15	27	87	Magneto		
22	10	4	(United States) Cecil Green	Kurtis Kraft-Offenhauser	131.89	31	80	Engine		
23	6	98	(United States) Troy Ruttman	Kurtis Kraft-Offenhauser	132.31	24	78	Engine		
24	32	6	(United States) Duke Dinsmore	Schroeder-Offenhauser	131.97	28	73	Overheating		
25	28	32	(United States) Chet Miller	Kurtis Kraft-Novi	135.79	3	56	Ignition		
26	13	44	(United States) Walt Brown	Kurtis Kraft-Offenhauser	131.90	30	55	Magneto		
27	25	48	(United States) Rodger Ward R	Bromme-Offenhauser	134.86	7	34	Oil Pipe		
28	18	23	(United States) Cliff Griffith R	Kurtis Kraft-Offenhauser	133.83	13	30	Axle		
29	20	81	(United States) Bill Vukovich R	Trevis-Offenhauser	133.72	16	29	Oil leak		
30	21	22	(United States) George Connor	Lesovsky-Offenhauser	133.35	19	29	Transmission		
31	23	19	(United States) Mack Hellings	Diedt-Offenhauser	132.92	33	18	Engine		
32	26	12	(United States) Johnny McDowell	Maserati-Offenhauser	132.47	23	15	Fuel leak		
33	30	26	(United States) Joe James R	Watson-Offenhauser	134.09	10	8	Transmission		

W Former Indianapolis 500 winner

R Indianapolis 500 Rookie

All entrants utilized Firestone tires.

- ^1 – Includes 1 point for fastest lead lap

=== Race statistics ===
Lap Leaders
Laps	Leader
1–2	Lee Wallard
3–4	Jack McGrath
5–6	Lee Wallard
7–15	Jack McGrath
16–26	Lee Wallard
27	Cecil Green
28–51	Lee Wallard
52–76	Jimmy Davies
77–80	Cecil Green
81–200	Lee Wallard

Total laps led
Driver	Laps
Lee Wallard	159
Jimmy Davies	25
Jack McGrath	11
Cecil Green	5

Yellow Lights: 1 minute, 30 seconds
Laps*	Reason
126	Mauri Rose crash in turn 3
* – Approximate lap counts

== Notes ==
- Pole position: Duke Nalon – 4:23.74 (136.498 mph)
- Fastest Lead Lap: Lee Wallard – 1:07.26 (133.809 mph)
- Ayulo (100 laps) and McGrath (100) shared the same car. Points for 3rd position were shared between the drivers.
- First Indianapolis 500 to be completed in under four hours.
- Roger Penske stated in a live interview on WRTV on November 4, 2019, when the Penske Corporation was announcing the purchased of all the IMS assets, that 1951 was the first race he attended at the Indianapolis Motor Speedway.
- Two months after the race, on July 29, three of the drivers in the 1951 starting lineup were fatally injured in accidents at different tracks. Walt Brown was killed at Williams Grove Speedway, while Cecil Green and Bill Mackey were killed in separate crashes at Funk's Speedway. The day become known in racing circles as "Black Sunday".

== World Drivers' Championship ==
1951 Indianapolis 500
Race 2 of 8 in the 1951 Formula One season
← Previous race	Next race →

Race details
- Date: May 30, 1951
- Location: Indianapolis Motor Speedway; Speedway, Indiana
- Course: Permanent racing facility
- Course length: 4.023 km (2.500 miles)
- Distance: 200 laps, 804.672 km (500.000 miles)

=== Background ===
The Indianapolis 500 was included in the FIA World Championship of Drivers from 1950 through 1960. The race was sanctioned by AAA through 1955, and then by USAC beginning in 1956. At the time the new world championship was announced and first organized by the CSI, the United States did not yet have a Grand Prix. Indianapolis Motor Speedway vice president and general manager Theodore E. "Pop" Meyers lobbied that the Indianapolis 500 be selected as the race to represent the country and to pay points towards the world championship.

Drivers competing at the Indianapolis 500 in 1950 through 1960 were credited with participation in and earned points towards the World Championship of Drivers. However, the machines competing at Indianapolis were not necessarily run to Formula One specifications and regulations. The drivers also earned separate points (on a different scale) towards the respective AAA or USAC national championships. No points, however, were awarded by the FIA towards the World Constructors' Championship.

=== Summary ===
The 1951 Indianapolis 500 was round 2 of 8 on the 1951 World Championship. The event, however, failed to attract interest from any of the regular competitors on the Grand Prix circuit, particularly since it was held only three days after the Swiss Grand Prix. Race winner Lee Wallard earned 9 points towards the World Championship (8 points for first place, and 1 point for the fastest lap). Despite not competing in any of the other World Championship events, he finished seventh in the final season standings.

==== World Drivers' Championship standings after the race ====
	Pos	Driver	Points
	1	(Argentina) Juan Manuel Fangio	9
20	2	(United States) Lee Wallard	9
1	3	(Italy) Piero Taruffi	6
18	4	(United States) Mike Nazaruk	6
2	5	(Italy) Nino Farina	4

- Note: Only the top five positions are listed. Only the best 4 results counted towards the Championship.

== Broadcasting ==
=== Radio ===
The race was carried live on the radio through a network arrangement set up by 1070 WIBC-AM of Indianapolis. Mutual, which had carried the race for several years, had raised its advertising rates for 1951, and lost its primary sponsor for the event, Perfect Circle Piston Rings. As a result, Mutual dropped the coverage altogether. Local station WIBC stepped in to cover the race, and provided its feed to various Mutual affiliates. A total of 26 stations carried the broadcast.

WIBC personality Sid Collins served as the chief announcer in the booth, and the remainder of the crew consisted mostly of WIBC talent. Jim Shelton reported from his familiar turn four location, and Bill Fox was also in the booth. Easy Gwynn was also to be part of the crew. Collins interviewed the winner in victory lane, leaving Fox to call the actual finish of the race. Like the Mutual broadcasts, WIBC featured live coverage of the start (30 minutes), the finish (30 minutes), and 15-minute live updates throughout the race. The on-air crew was smaller than normal. There were not turn and pit reporters stationed around the entire track, instead recorded interviews were played back during later broadcast segments.

Previous race: 1951 Swiss Grand Prix	FIA Formula One World Championship; 1951 season	Next race: 1951 Belgian Grand Prix
Previous race: 1950 Indianapolis 500; Johnnie Parsons	1951 Indianapolis 500; Lee Wallard	Next race: 1952 Indianapolis 500; Troy Ruttman
Preceded by 124.002 mph (1950 Indianapolis 500)	Record for the Indianapolis 500 fastest average speed 126.244 mph	Succeeded by 128.922 mph (1952 Indianapolis 500)
