= Gordon Schroeder =

American motorsport constructor

- Born: February 24, 1915; Minneapolis, Minnesota, U.S.
- Died: August 31, 1995 (aged 80)
- Spouse: Carmen
- Engineering career
- Employers: Samson; Self
- Projects: Indy 500 cars
- Significant design: Self release steering hub

Gordon Schroeder (February 24, 1915- August 31, 1995) was an American racing car constructor. Schroeder cars competed in four FIA World Championship races - the 1951, 1953, 1954 and 1955 Indianapolis 500.

== History ==
Schroeder was born in Minneapolis, Minnesota.

In 1929, together with Riley Brett, Schroeder reconstructed an old V16 engine of a Frank Lockhart car for Myron Stevens. Schroeder was enamoured by the engine and bought during the Second World War, with driver Sam Hanks qualifying it for front row in the 1946 Indy, only for the car not complete distance. Schroeder also collaborated with Stevens and Clint Brawner to build cars in the 1950s.

Schroeder moved from racing to focus on a manufacturing business after the deaths of two of his friends, Rex Mays in 1949 and Bobby Ball in 1954. He began work in steering hubs, starting with gears, in the mid 1940s; and went on to produce the first quick-release steering hub approved by NASCAR.

=== World Championship Indianapolis 500 results ===
Season	Driver	Grid	Classification	Points	Note	Race Report
1951	Bobby Ball	29	5	2		Report
1951	Duke Dinsmore	32	24		Overheating	Report
1953	Jimmy Bryan	31	14			Report
1954	Andy Linden	23	25		Suspension	Report
1954	Len Duncan	26	31		Brakes	Report
1955	Keith Andrews	28	20		Fuel pump	Report
