= Bill Mackey =

American racing driver

- Born: William Christopher Gretsinger, Jr. December 15, 1927; Dayton, Ohio, U.S.
- Died: July 29, 1951 (aged 23); Winchester, Indiana, U.S.

Formula One World Championship career
- Nationality: (United States) American
- Active years: 1951
- Team: Stevens
- Entries: 1
- Championships: 0
- Wins: 0
- Podiums: 0
- Career points: 0
- Pole positions: 0
- Fastest laps: 0
- First entry: 1951 Indianapolis 500

Bill Mackey (December 15, 1927 – July 29, 1951) was an American racecar driver. His name at birth was William Christopher Gretsinger Jr.

Mackey was killed while attempting to qualify for an AAA sprint car race at Funk's Speedway in Winchester, Indiana on July 29, 1951, a day which became known as "Black Sunday".

== Indianapolis 500 results ==
Year	Car	Start	Qual	Rank	Finish	Laps	Led	Retired
1951	71	33	131.473	33	19	97	0	Clutch shaft
Totals						97	0	

Starts	1
Poles	0
Front Row	0
Wins	0
Top 5	0
Top 10	0
Retired	1

== World Championship career summary ==
The Indianapolis 500 was part of the FIA World Championshipfrom 1950 through 1960. Drivers competing at Indy during those years were credited with World Championship points and participation. Mackey participated in one World Championship race but scored no World Championship points.
