= Roy Sherman =

Roy Sherman (August 31, 1909 - October 20, 1968) was an American racing driver and car builder.

As a driver, Sherman won many races and titles in midget cars. He was inducted into the National Midget Auto Racing Hall of Fame in 2004.

Cars built by Sherman competed in two FIA World Championship races - the 1951 and 1952 Indianapolis 500.

== World Championship Indianapolis 500 results ==
| Season | Driver | Grid | Classification | Points | Note | Race Report |
|---|---|---|---|---|---|---|
| 1951 | Andy Linden | 31 | 4 | 3 | | Report |
| 1952 | George Fonder | 13 | 15 | | | Report |
