= Myron Stevens =

American racing driver (1901–1988)

- Born: Myron George Stevens; February 17, 1901 Los Angeles, California, U.S.
- Died: July 2, 1988 (aged 87) Sun City West, Arizona, U.S.

Champ Car career
- 2 races run over 3 years
- Best finish: 9th (tie) (1929)
- First race: 1929 Altoona 200 #2 (Altoona)
- Last race: 1931 Indianapolis 500 (Indianapolis)
Wins	Podiums	Poles
0	1	0

Myron George Stevens (February 17, 1901 – July 2, 1988) was an American racing driver and constructor.

== Career ==
Stevens started working for Harry A. Miller in 1922, building bodies, frames and fuel tanks for Miller race cars. In 1927, Frank Lockhart, the winner of the 1926 Indianapolis 500, hired Stevens to help create the body for Lockhart's Stutz Black Hawk land speed record car.

After Lockhart was killed in that car while attempting a land speed record in 1928, Stevens established his own shop and continued building racecar bodies. In 1930, the second through sixth-place finishers at the Indianapolis 500 all had Stevens chassis. He built cars for Indianapolis stars such as Louis Meyer, Wilbur Shaw, Peter DePaolo, Chet Gardner, Rex Mays and others. In 1955, one of his cars took pole position at Indianapolis.

== Awards and honors ==
- Stevens was inducted in the National Sprint Car Hall of Fame in 1993.
- Indianapolis Motor Speedway Hall of Fame inducted Stevens into its ranks in 1993.

== Motorsports career results ==
=== Indianapolis 500 results ===
Year	Car	Start	Qual	Rank	Finish	Laps	Led	Retired
1931	21	35	107.463	21	4	200	0	Running
Totals						200	0	

Starts	1
Poles	0
Front Row	0
Wins	0
Top 5	1
Top 10	1
Retired	0

=== World Drivers' Championship Indianapolis 500 results as a car builder ===
The Indianapolis 500 was a round of the World Drivers' Championship from 1950 to 1960. During that period, Stevens cars' achieved the following results:

Season	Driver	Grid	Classification	Points	Note	Race Report
1950	Duane Carter	13	12			Report
1951	Bill Mackey	33	19			Report
1952	Bill Schindler	15	14			Report
1952	Bobby Ball	17	32		Gearbox	Report
1953	Ernie McCoy	20	8			Report
1953	Andy Linden	5	33		Accident	Report
1954	Cal Niday	13	10			Report
1954	Ed Elisian	31	18			Report
1955	Jerry Hoyt	1	31		Oil leak	Report
1956	Cliff Griffith	30	10			Report
