= Len Duncan =

- Born: July 25, 1911; Brooklyn, New York, U.S.
- Died: August 1, 1998 (aged 87); Lansdale, Pennsylvania, U.S.

Formula One World Championship career
- Nationality: (United States) American
- Active years: 1953–1956
- Team(s): Kurtis Kraft, Schroeder
- Entries: 4 (1 start)
- Championships: 0
- Wins: 0
- Podiums: 0
- Career points: 0
- Pole positions: 0
- Fastest laps: 0
- First entry: 1953 Indianapolis 500
- Last entry: 1956 Indianapolis 500

Len Duncan (July 25, 1911 Brooklyn, New York – August 1, 1998 Lansdale, Pennsylvania) was an American race car driver. Duncan raced midget cars in seven decades from 1920s until the 1980s. During World War II, received the honor of being assigned as President Harry S. Truman's driver during one of his visits to England. Mario Andretti credits Duncan with having a great influence on his professional life. Andretti raced against Duncan in the American Racing Drivers Club (ARDC) series in 1963.

== Midget car career ==
Duncan began racing in 1928. Duncan was the AAA Eastern Midget Champion. Duncan won eight American Racing Drivers Club (ARDC) championships during the thirteen years between 1955 and 1967.

== Career award ==
- Duncan was inducted in the National Midget Auto Racing Hall of Fame in 1991.

== Indy 500 results ==
| Year | Car | Start | Qual | Rank | Finish | Laps | Led | Retired |
|---|---|---|---|---|---|---|---|---|
| 1954 | 33 | 26 | 139.217 | 9 | 31 | 101 | 0 | Brakes |
| Totals | | | | | | 101 | 0 | |

| Starts | 1 |
| Poles | 0 |
| Front Row | 0 |
| Wins | 0 |
| Top 5 | 0 |
| Top 10 | 0 |
| Retired | 1 |

== Complete Formula One World Championship results ==
(key)

| Year | Entrant | Chassis | Engine | 1 | 2 | 3 | 4 | 5 | 6 | 7 | 8 | 9 | WDC | Points |
|---|---|---|---|---|---|---|---|---|---|---|---|---|---|---|
| 1953 | Caccia Motors | Schroeder | Offenhauser L4 | ARG | 500; DNQ | NED | BEL | FRA | GBR | GER | SUI | ITA | NC | 0 |
| 1954 | Ray Brady | Schroeder | Offenhauser L4 | ARG | 500; 31 * | BEL | FRA | GBR | GER | SUI | ITA | ESP | NC | 0 |
| 1955 | Ray Brady | Kurtis Kraft 4000 | Offenhauser L4 | ARG | MON | 500; DNQ | BEL | NED | GBR | ITA | | | NC | 0 |
| 1956 | Ray Brady | Kurtis Kraft 4000 | Offenhauser L4 | ARG | MON | 500; DNQ | BEL | FRA | GBR | GER | ITA | | NC | 0 |

* Indicates shared drive with George Fonder
