= Centennial Race Track =

Horse racing track in Littleton, Colorado

Centennial Race Track was a horse racing track located in Littleton, Colorado. The facility opened on July 4, 1950 after the Colorado legislature passed the Parimutuel Act of 1948 opening the way for parimutuel betting, and offered both thoroughbred and quarterhorse (sprint) races. Nearly 10,000 people attended opening day, with a handle of over $500,000. The track faced stiff competition from nearby tracks and its geographic location placed it far from the famed stables on the east and west coasts. As a result, attendance dropped sharply during the first year. For the remainder of the 1950 season, income only averaged $50,000 per day. The track was devastated by the 1965 Great South Platte Flood, forcing the rescue of more than a hundred horses by owners, trainers and jockeys.

Diversification was planned early on with IndyCar motor races held on the track in 1951 and 1952, but not after that.

Track promoters brought in famous jockeys such as Bill Shoemaker and Bill Hartack to bring prestige to the course, but attendance continued to decline. In 1981, the property was sold to the Talley Corporation and Denver developer Kenneth Good for $17.7 million. The last race was held on November 6, 1983, the facility was demolished and the land used for a housing development. [dead link]
