= Carl Forberg =

American racecar driver (1911–2000)

- Born: March 4, 1911; Omaha, Nebraska, U.S.
- Died: January 17, 2000 (aged 88)

Formula One World Championship career
- Nationality: (United States) American
- Active years: 1950–1952
- Team(s): Maserati, Miller, Kurtis Kraft
- Entries: 3 (1 start)
- Championships: 0
- Wins: 0
- Podiums: 0
- Career points: 0
- Pole positions: 0
- Fastest laps: 0
- First entry: 1950 Indianapolis 500
- Last entry: 1952 Indianapolis 500

Carl Roy Forberg (March 4, 1911 – January 17, 2000) was an American racecar driver from Omaha, Nebraska.

== Indy 500 results ==
| Year | Car | Start | Qual | Rank | Finish | Laps | Led | Retired |
|---|---|---|---|---|---|---|---|---|
| 1951 | 68 | 24 | 132.890 | 23 | 7 | 193 | 0 | Flagged |
| Totals | | | | | | 193 | 0 | |

| Starts | 1 |
| Poles | 0 |
| Front Row | 0 |
| Wins | 0 |
| Top 5 | 0 |
| Top 10 | 1 |
| Retired | 0 |

== World Championship career summary ==
The Indianapolis 500 was part of the FIA World Championship from 1950 through 1960. Drivers competing at Indy during those years were credited with World Championship points and participation. Forberg participated in one World Championship race, finishing seventh.
