= George Fonder =

American racecar driver

- Born: June 22, 1917; Elmhurst, Pennsylvania, U.S.
- Died: June 14, 1958 (aged 40); Hatfield, Pennsylvania, U.S.

Formula One World Championship career
- Nationality: (United States) American
- Active years: 1950–1954
- Team(s): Sherman, Kurtis Kraft, Schroeder, Silnes, Diedt
- Entries: 5 (2 starts)
- Championships: 0
- Wins: 0
- Podiums: 0
- Career points: 0
- Pole positions: 0
- Fastest laps: 0
- First entry: 1950 Indianapolis 500
- Last entry: 1954 Indianapolis 500

George Thomas Fonder (June 22, 1917 Elmhurst, Pennsylvania – June 14, 1958 Hatfield, Pennsylvania) was an American racecar driver. He made four Championship Car starts, including two in the Indianapolis 500 and drove as a relief driver in the 1954 Indianapolis 500 for two different teams after failing to qualify his own car. His best Champ Car finish was in the October 1949 race at Langhorne Speedway. He was killed in a midget-car racing accident.

== Indy 500 results ==
Year	Car	Start	Qual	Rank	Finish	Laps	Led	Retired
1949	38	25	127.289	22	20	116	0	Valve
1952	65	13	135.947	13	15	197	0	Flagged
1954	33	-	-	-	Ret*	?	?	Brake cylinder
1954	71	-	-	-	19**	?	?	Flagged
Totals						313	0	

Starts	2
Poles	0
Front Row	0
Wins	0
Top 5	0
Top 10	0
Retired	1

* Shared drive with Len Duncan
** Shared drive with Frank Armi

== World Championship career summary ==
The Indianapolis 500 was part of the FIA World Championshipfrom 1950 through 1960. Drivers competing at Indy during those years were credited with World Championship points and participation. George Fonder participated in 2 World Championship races. He started on the pole 0 times, won 0 races, set 0 fastest laps, and finished on the podium 0 times. He accumulated a total of 0 championship points.
