= Gene Force =

American racing driver

- Born: June 15, 1916
- Died: August 21, 1983 (aged 67)

Formula One World Championship career
- Nationality: (United States) American
- Active years: 1951–1952, 1957, 1959–1960
- Team(s): Kurtis Kraft, Schroeder, Watts, Kuzma, Watson
- Entries: 5 (2 starts)
- Championships: 0
- Wins: 0
- Podiums: 0
- Career points: 0
- Pole positions: 0
- Fastest laps: 0
- First entry: 1951 Indianapolis 500
- Last entry: 1960 Indianapolis 500

Eugene Robert Force (June 15, 1916 – August 21, 1983) was an American racecar driver.

Born in New Madison, Ohio, Force died in Brooklyn, Michigan as a result a heart attack at Michigan International Speedway. He drove in the AAA and USAC Championship Car series, racing in the 1951–1952, 1954, 1956, and 1958-1960 seasons with 33 starts, including the 1951 and 1960 Indianapolis 500 races. He finished in the top ten 16 times, with his best career finish in 3rd place occurring on 3 occasions.

The "McKay Special" #37 car that Force drove in the 1960 Indianapolis 500 was a 1959 Kurtis Kraft 500J, owned and entered by Roy McKay of Dayton, Ohio. Charlie Altfater was the mechanic. The car has survived in largely original condition and is now restored to appear as it did in the 1960 race, and can occasionally be seen participating in vintage races, as it did at the 2008 Monterey historics.

== Indianapolis 500 results ==
Year	Car	Start	Qual	Rank	Finish	Laps	Led	Retired
1951	69	22	133.102	20	11	142	0	Oil pressure
1960	37	20	143.472	21	28	74	0	Brakes
Totals						216	0	

Starts	2
Poles	0
Front Row	0
Wins	0
Top 5	0
Top 10	0
Retired	2

== World Championship career summary ==
The Indianapolis 500 was part of the FIA World Championship from 1950 through 1960. Drivers competing at Indy during those years were credited with World Championship points and participation. Force participated in two World Championship races. He started on the pole 0 times, won 0 races, set 0 fastest laps, and finished on the podium 0 times. He accumulated a total of 0 championship points.
