= Michigan State Fairgrounds Speedway =

Former American race track

Drome
- Location: Michigan State Fair; Detroit, Michigan
- Coordinates: 42°26′33″N 83°06′40″W
- Opened: 1899
- Major events: AAA/USAC Indy Car; Detroit 100 (1949–1953, 1957); NASCAR Grand National; Motor City 250 (1951–1952)

Oval
- Surface: Dirt
- Length: 1.6 km (0.99 mi)

The Michigan State Fairgrounds Speedway was a dirt oval racing track located in Detroit, Michigan. The track was built in 1899 for horse racing, and was part of the grounds purchased to provide a permanent venue for the Michigan State Fair. Joseph Lowthian Hudson donated the land, at Woodward Avenue and what is now 8 Mile Road, to the Michigan State Agricultural Society.

By 1908, the racetrack, at the east end of the fairgrounds, had a 5,000-seat capacity grandstand. The track originally hosted thoroughbred flat racing as well as standardbred harness racing. Later, it was used for auto racing, after the growth of that industry. In 1971 the grandstand was declared unsafe and was demolished in 2001.

== Race winners ==
=== AAA/USAC Champ Car race winners ===
Season	Date	Driver	Chassis	Engine	Sanctioning body
1928	June 10	(United States) Ray Keech	Miller	Miller	AAA
1929	June 9	(United States) Cliff Woodbury	Miller (2)	Miller (2)	AAA
1930	June 9	(United States) Wilbur Shaw	Smith	Miller (3)	AAA
1931	June 14	(United States) Louis Meyer	Stevens	Miller (4)	AAA
1932	June 9	(United States) Bob Carey	Stevens (2)	Miller (5)	AAA
1932	September 10	(United States) Mauri Rose	Stevens (3)	Miller (6)	AAA
1933	June 11	(United States) Bill Cummings	Miller (3)	Miller (6)	AAA
1949	September 11	(United States) Tony Bettenhausen	Kurtis Kraft	Offenhauser	AAA
1950	September 10	(United States) Henry Banks	Moore	Offenhauser (2)	AAA
1951	September 9	(United States) Paul Russo	Russo/Nichels	Offenhauser (3)	AAA
1952	August 30	(United States) Bill Vukovich	Kuzma	Offenhauser (4)	AAA
1953	July 4	(United States) Rodger Ward	Kurtis Kraft (2)	Offenhauser (5)	AAA
1957	June 23	(United States) Jimmy Bryan	Kuzma (2)	Offenhauser (6)	USAC

=== NASCAR Grand National race winners ===
Season	Date	Winning Driver	Chassis
1951	August 12	Tommy Thompson	1951 Chrysler
1952	August 12	Tim Flock	1951 Hudson
