= Andy Linden (racing driver) =

American racing driver (1922–1987)

- Born: Andrew Logan Linden; April 5, 1922 Brownsville, Pennsylvania, U.S.
- Died: February 11, 1987 (aged 64) Los Angeles, California, U.S.

Champ Car career
- 66 races run over 8 years
- Years active: 1950–1957
- Best finish: 5th – 1955
- First race: 1950 Langhorne 100 (Langhorne)
- Last race: 1957 Golden State 100 (Sacramento)
Wins	Podiums	Poles
0	4	3

Formula One World Championship career
- Active years: 1950–1957
- Team(s): Sherman, Kurtis Kraft, Bromme, Stevens, Schroeder, Nichels
- Entries: 8 (7 starts)
- Championships: 0
- Wins: 0
- Podiums: 0
- Career points: 5
- Pole positions: 0
- Fastest laps: 0
- First entry: 1950 Indianapolis 500
- Last entry: 1957 Indianapolis 500

Andrew Logan Linden (April 5, 1922 – February 11, 1987) was an American racecar driver.

== Early life and military service ==
Linden was born on April 5, 1922, in Brownsville, Pennsylvania. He served in the United States Navy, where he was a standout boxer, and the National Guard. He also rode hot rods in Los Angeles, California.

== Career ==
Linden raced with great success until a 1957 crash caused a piece of metal to break his helmet, causing career ending brain damage. He is also technically a former Formula One World Championship driver, as the Indianapolis 500 was part of the FIA World Championship from 1950 through 1960, meaning that drivers competing at Indy during those years were credited with World Championship points and participation. Linden thus participated in seven World Championship races, accumulating a total of five championship points.

In 2013, Linden was inducted into the National Sprint Car Hall of Fame.

Linden died in Harbor City, California, on February 11, 1987, and is buried at Inglewood Park Cemetery in Inglewood.

== Indy 500 results ==
Year	Car	Start	Qual	Rank	Finish	Laps	Led	Retired
1951	57	31	132.226	26	4	200	0	Running
1952	9	2	137.002	4	33	20	0	Oil leak
1953	32	5	136.060	19	33	3	0	Crash T3
1954	74	23	137.820	28	25	165	0	Torsion bar
1955	19	8	139.098	22	6	200	0	Running
1956	5	9	143.056	11	27	90	0	Oil leak
1957	73	12	143.244	5	5	200	0	Running
Totals						878	0	

Starts	7
Poles	0
Front Row	1
Wins	0
Top 5	2
Top 10	3
Retired	4

Records
Preceded by Manny Ayulo; 29 years, 221 days (1951 Indianapolis 500)	Youngest driver to score points in Formula One; 29 years, 54 days (1951 Indianapolis 500)	Succeeded by Bobby Ball; 25 years, 276 days (1951 Indianapolis 500)
