= Raleigh Speedway =

Auto race track

Coordinates: 35°49′39″N 78°36′38″W

Raleigh Speedway (officially Southland Speedway nicknamed Dixie Speedway by fans) was a one-mile (1.6 km) oval race track which opened in 1952 one mile (1.6 km) north of Raleigh, North Carolina in Wake County. It was the second superspeedway (according to the definition of the time) ever built (the first being the 1.366-mile (2.198 km) Darlington Raceway at Darlington, South Carolina). It was also the first lighted superspeedway and the first track on which NASCAR sanctioned night-time races. The track had a long and narrow shape, like a paper clip, with the front and back straights about 500 feet (150 m) apart and the straightaways about 1,850 feet (560 m) long. The turns were banked at 16° and the straightaways were flat.

== History ==
The track opened in 1952 as Southland Speedway. Its first major event was a 200-mile (320 km) AAA sanctioned IndyCar race held on July 4, 1952. That race was won by Troy Ruttman in an Offy powered Kuzma. From 1953 the track was known as Raleigh Speedway. NASCAR races were held at the track from 1953 to 1958. On the 1/4-mile (0.4 km) infield track there were weekly Modified and Sportsman races on Fridays. Occasionally, the Sportsman and Modified's ran on the one-mile (1.6 km) track. The Grand National series ran 100, 250, and 300-mile (480 km) races yearly (twice in 1955). The final three Grand National races were held on July 4, 1956, 1957, and 1958. When the Daytona International Speedway opened, the July 4 Grand National event moved to that track. Shortly thereafter, the Raleigh Speedway closed due to noise complaints from residents of nearby neighborhoods. The track was demolished in 1967. Most of the track site is now The Seaboard Industrial Park with the Seaboard Coast Line Railroad (CSX) siding occupying the former location of the front straight. About 90' of the backstretch remain in the woods just southwest of the Progress Energy substation on Tarheel Drive.

== Major race results ==
Race	Date	Field	Winner	Year/Make	Distance	Purse	Pole Speed (mph)	Race Speed (mph)
Raleigh 200	1952-07-04 Saturday (Independence Day)	24	Troy Ruttman	Kuzma-Offenhauser	200	N/A	N/A	89.778
Raleigh 300	1953-05-30 Saturday (Memorial Day)	49	Fonty Flock	1953 Hudson	300	$13,100	76.230	70.629
Raleigh 250	1954-05-29 Saturday (Memorial Day)†	35	Herb Thomas	1954 Hudson	250	$9,150	76.660	73.909
N/A	1955-08-20 Saturday	29	Herb Thomas	1955 Buick	100	$6,075	78.722	76.400
N/A	1955-09-30 Friday	36	Fonty Flock	1955 Chrysler	100	$4,285	82.098	73.289
Raleigh 250	1956-07-04 Wednesday (Independence Day)	36	Fireball Roberts	1956 Ford	250	$13,425	82.587	79.822
Raleigh 250	1957-07-04 Thursday (Independence Day)	53	Paul Goldsmith	1957 Ford	250	$17,175	83.371	75.693
Raleigh 250	1958-07-04 Friday (Independence Day)	55	Fireball Roberts	1957 Chevrolet	250	$16,605	83.896	73.691

† 1954 Memorial Day, then always celebrated on May 30, fell on a Sunday. So, the 1954 Grand National race was held on Saturday, May 29.

== Fatalities ==
The only fatalities at the track occurred during a night race on September 19, 1953. Drivers Bill Blevins (Ford) and Jesse Midkiff (Burlington, North Carolina) were killed during the start of a combined Modified and Sportsman race. Blevins car would not start as the 60-car field took off. He got a start from a push truck, but stalled and came to a stop in the racing line at the exit of turn two on the backstretch — perhaps under the mistaken assumption that he would get another push-start. Blevin's dark maroon car went unnoticed by race officials as the green flag waved. Some in the crowd noticed the stalled car and yelled and pointed, but the flag man never noticed. The remaining 59 cars exited turn two at full speed. One car ran into the back of the stalled car starting a chain-reaction crash. Blevin's car burst into flames, and with only two fire extinguishers at the track it took considerable time to get the fire put out. There was no way to get the driver out of the car with flames shooting 100 feet (30 m) into the air. Blevins and Midkiff were killed, and several other drivers suffered lesser injuries. At least 15 cars were severely damaged. It took about 1 hour and 20 minutes to clear the track, after which the race was shortened to 170 miles (270 km) and won by Buddy Shuman.

== Trivia ==
- Fonty Flock started 43rd in the 1953 Grand National race and won. This record for the worst start by a race winner in NASCAR's top series still stands as tie to Johnny Mantz' win from 43rd at the 1950 Southern 500 in Darlington.
- Jocko Flocko, Tim Flock's pet monkey, accompanied the racer in-car for the final time at the 1953 Grand National race. Somehow Jocko got loose from his seat harness and began exploring the race car. He found a string that lifted a trap door where the driver could check the condition of the right-front tire. As Jocko opened the door, a pebble flew up and struck him in the head. The monkey went berserk and Tim, who was leading the race at the time, had to pit to have the crazed primate removed from the car. Tim finished third as a result.
- In December 1953, Nash held a series of tests for the Metropolitan including a 24-hour endurance and speed test. One Metro completed 1,467 miles (2,361 km) in 24 hours at 61 mph (98 km/h). Another averaged 41.57 mpg at 35 mpg for 24 hours.
- Lee Petty, Speedy Thompson, Buck Baker, and Jim Paschal ran the most races at Raleigh (7). A total of seven NASCAR Grand National races were held at Raleigh Speedway.
- Herb Thomas, Fireball Roberts, and Fonty Flock had the most wins (2).
- Herb Thomas had the most top five finishes (5).
- Herb Thomas and Buck Baker had the most top ten finishes (5).
- Buck Baker ran the most laps (1,445).
- Fireball Roberts lead the most laps (334) and earned the most money ($7,275).
- Lee Petty and Speedy Thompson finished the most races (6).
- If any driver "owned" the Raleigh Speedway it was Herb Thomas. Of the six races he ran at the track, he qualified in the top ten every time and in the top five five times (one pole, three thirds, one fifth, and one ninth). He finished in the top five five times (two wins, one second, two fourths) with his 1957 DNF for brakes being his only finish out of the top five (46th). Herb also has the most lead-lap finishes (3).
