= 1952 Indianapolis 500 =

American motor race

36th Indianapolis 500
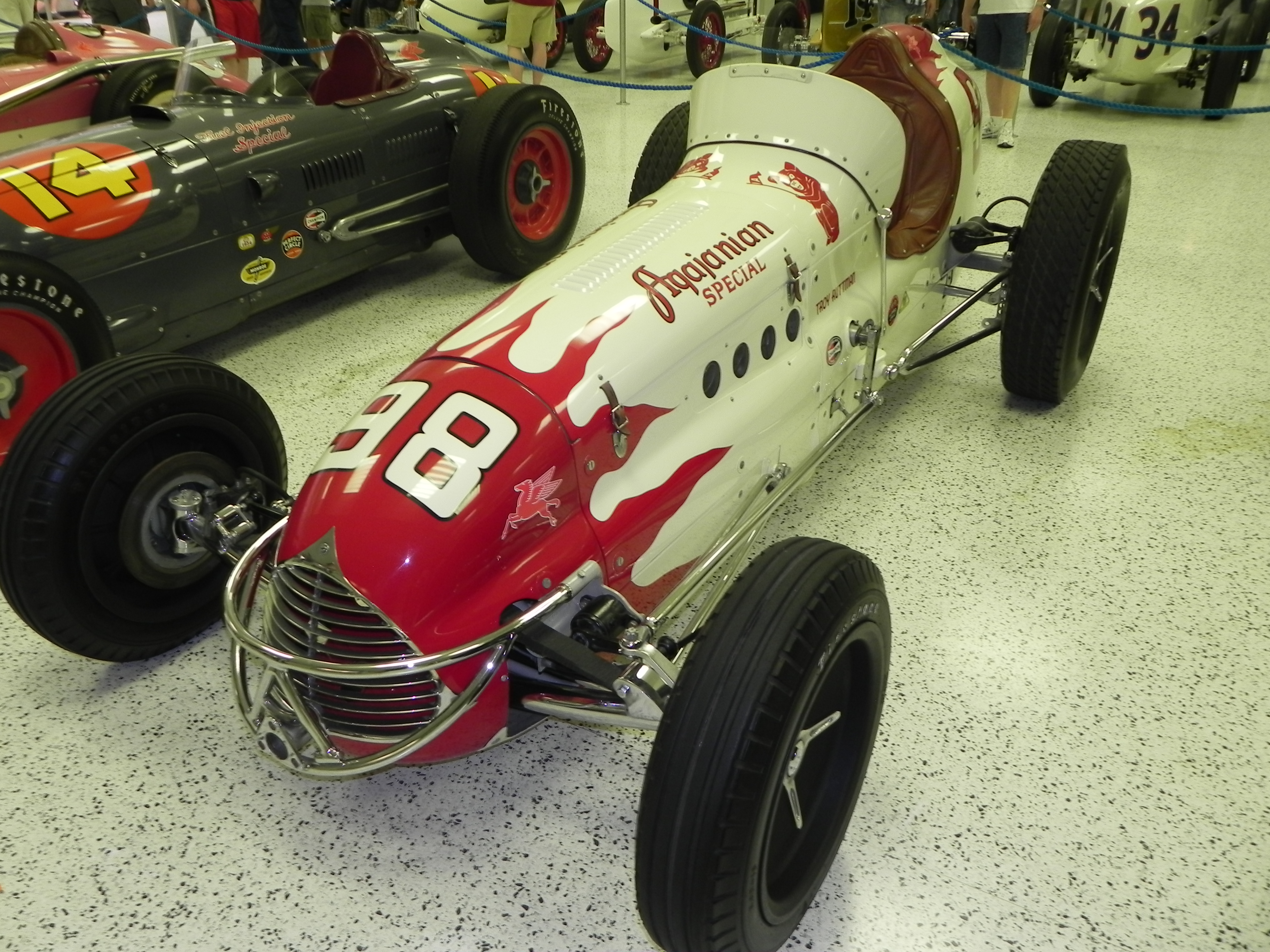

Indianapolis Motor Speedway

Indianapolis 500
- Sanctioning body: AAA
- Date: May 30, 1952
- Winner: Troy Ruttman
- Winning Entrant: J. C. Agajanian
- Winning Chief Mechanic: Clay Smith
- Winning time: 3:52:41.93
- Average speed: 128.922 mph (207.480 km/h)
- Pole position: Fred Agabashian
- Pole speed: 138.010 mph (222.106 km/h)
- Most laps led: Bill Vukovich (150)

Pre-race
- Pace car: Studebaker Commander
- Pace car driver: P.O. Peterson
- Starter: Seth Klein
- Honorary referee: Raymond Firestone
- Estimated attendance: 200,000

Chronology
Previous	Next
1951	1953

The 36th International 500-Mile Sweepstakes was a motor race held at the Indianapolis Motor Speedway on Friday, May 30, 1952. It was the opening race of the 1952 AAA National Championship Trail and was also race 2 of 8 in the 1952 World Championship of Drivers.

Troy Ruttman won the race for car owner J. C. Agajanian. Ruttman, aged 22 years and 80 days, set the record for the youngest 500 winner in history. It was also the last dirt track car to win at Indy. Ruttman's win also saw him become the youngest winner of a World Drivers' Championship race, a record he would hold for 51 years until the 2003 Hungarian Grand Prix when Spanish driver Fernando Alonso won at the age of 22 years and 26 days.

Bill Vukovich led 150 laps, but with 9 laps to go, he broke a steering linkage while leading. He nursed his car to a stop against the outside wall, preventing other cars from getting involved in the incident.

In the third year that the 500 was included in the World Championship, Ferrari entered the race with Alberto Ascari driving a Ferrari 375 Indianapolis. The effort gained considerable attention, but Ascari was forced to retire after a few laps when the hub of a wheel on his car collapsed. He was classified 31st. It was the only World Championship race in 1952 that Ascari entered and did not win.

Fifth place finisher Art Cross was voted the Rookie of the Year. Though at least one rookie starter was in the field every year dating back to 1911, this was the first time the now-popular award was officially designated.

== Time trials ==
Time trials was scheduled for four days, but rain pushed qualifying into a fifth day.

- Saturday May 17 – Pole Day time trials
- Sunday May 18 – Second day time trials (rained out)
- Saturday May 24 – Third day time trials
- Sunday May 25 – Fourth day time trials (rained out)
- Monday May 26 – Fifth day time trials (rain make up day)

== Starting grid ==
Row	Inside		Middle		Outside	
1	28	(United States) Fred Agabashian	9	(United States) Andy Linden	4	(United States) Jack McGrath
2	36	(United States) Duke Nalon	18	(United States) Sam Hanks	1	(United States) Duane Carter
3	98	(United States) Troy Ruttman	26	(United States) Bill Vukovich	22	(United States) Cliff Griffith
4	59	(United States) Jim Rathmann	16	(United States) Chuck Stevenson	2	(United States) Henry Banks
5	65	(United States) George Fonder	54	(United States) George Connor	7	(United States) Bill Schindler
6	14	(United States) Joe James	55	(United States) Bobby Ball	67	(United States) Gene Hartley
7	12	(Italy) Alberto Ascari R	33	(United States) Art Cross R	77	(United States) Jimmy Bryan R
8	34	(United States) Rodger Ward	37	(United States) Jimmy Reece R	81	(United States) Eddie Johnson R
9	93	(United States) Bob Scott R	29	(United States) Jim Rigsby R	21	(United States) Chet Miller
10	8	(United States) Manny Ayulo	48	(United States) Spider Webb	27	(United States) Tony Bettenhausen
11	5	(United States) Johnnie Parsons W	73	(United States) Bob Sweikert R	31	(United States) Johnny McDowell

R Indianapolis 500 rookie
W Indianapolis 500 winner

=== Failed to qualify ===
All drivers from the United States unless stated.

- Frank Armi R (#39)
- George Armstrong R – Did not arrive
- Buzz Barton R (#58)
- Joe Barzda R (#53)
- Bill Boyd R (#92) – Did not arrive
- Bill Cantrell (#52)
- Neal Carter R (#25)
- Jimmy Daywalt R (#64)
- Duke Dinsmore (#68)
- Giuseppe Farina (Italy) R – Withdrew
- Walt Faulkner (#3)
- Johnny Fedricks R (#82)
- Carl Forberg (#53)
- Gene Force (#96)
- Dick Fraizer R (#63)
- Potsy Goacher R (#93)
- Perry Grimm R (#55)
- Peter Hahn R (#74)
- Allen Heath (Canada) R (#32, #97)
- Tommy Hinnershitz (#27)
- Jackie Holmes (#41)
- Jimmy Jackson (#61)
- Danny Kladis (#19)
- Jud Larson R (#39, #66)
- Bayliss Levrett (#69) – Wrecked practice, retired
- Frank Luptow R (#56)
- George Lynch R (#74)
- Johnny Mauro (#35)
- Mike Nazaruk (#5, #66)
- Danny Oakes R (#39)
- Puffy Puffer R
- Paul Russo (#10)
- Carl Scarborough (#33, #44)
- Albert Scully R (#62) – Did not arrive
- Doc Shanebrook R (#76)
- Ottis Stine R (#84)
- Bill Taylor R (#47)
- George Tichenor R (#88)
- Johnnie Tolan (#51) R
- Leroy Warriner (#27) R
- Chuck Weyant (#92) R – Did not arrive

== Box score ==
Finish	Grid	No.	Driver	Constructor	Qualifying		Laps	Time/Retired	Points	
Finish	Grid	No.	Driver	Constructor	Speed	Rank	Laps	Time/Retired	USAC	WDC
1	7	98	(United States) Troy Ruttman	Kuzma-Offenhauser	135.36	18	200	128.922 mph	1000	8
2	10	59	(United States) Jim Rathmann	Kurtis Kraft-Offenhauser	136.34	7	200	+4:02.33	800	6
3	5	18	(United States) Sam Hanks	Kurtis Kraft-Offenhauser	135.73	14	200	+6:11.61	700	4
4	6	1	(United States) Duane Carter	Lesovsky-Offenhauser	135.52	16	200	+6:48.34	600	3
5	20	33	(United States) Art Cross R	Kurtis Kraft-Offenhauser	134.28	26	200	+8:40.15	500	2
6	21	77	(United States) Jimmy Bryan R	Kurtis Kraft-Offenhauser	134.14	27	200	+9:24.32	400	
7	23	37	(United States) Jimmy Reece R	Kurtis Kraft-Offenhauser	133.99	29	200	+10:35.24	300	
8	14	54	(United States) George Connor	Kurtis Kraft-Offenhauser	135.60	15	200	+12:00.61	250	
9	9	22	(United States) Cliff Griffith	Kurtis Kraft-Offenhauser	136.61	6	200	+12:23.76	200	
10	31	5	(United States) Johnnie Parsons W	Kurtis Kraft-Offenhauser	135.32	19	200	+13:37.78	150	
11	3	4	(United States) Jack McGrath	Kurtis Kraft-Offenhauser	136.66	5	200	+14:21.72	100	
12	26	29	(United States) Jim Rigsby R	Watson-Offenhauser	133.90	33	200	+16:05.10	50	
13	16	14	(United States) Joe James	Kurtis Kraft-Offenhauser	134.95	22	200	+16:55.65		
14	15	7	(United States) Bill Schindler	Stevens-Offenhauser	134.98	20	200	+18:48.66		
15	13	65	(United States) George Fonder	Sherman-Offenhauser	135.94	13	197	+3 Laps		
16	24	81	(United States) Eddie Johnson R	Trevis-Offenhauser	133.97	30	193	+7 Laps		
17	8	26	(United States) Bill Vukovich	Kurtis Kraft-Offenhauser	138.21	2	191	Steering		1^{1}
18	11	16	(United States) Chuck Stevenson	Kurtis Kraft-Offenhauser	136.14	9	187	+13 Laps		
19	12	2	(United States) Henry Banks	Lesovsky-Offenhauser	135.96	11	184	+16 Laps		
20	28	8	(United States) Manny Ayulo	Lesovsky-Offenhauser	135.98	10	184	+16 Laps		
21	33	31	(United States) Johnny McDowell	Kurtis Kraft-Offenhauser	133.93	32	182	+18 Laps		
22	29	48	(United States) Spider Webb	Bromme-Offenhauser	135.96	12	162	Oil leak		
23	22	34	(United States) Rodger Ward	Kurtis Kraft-Offenhauser	134.13	28	130	Oil Pressure		
24	30	27	(United States) Tony Bettenhausen	Diedt-Offenhauser	135.38	17	93	Oil Pressure		
25	4	36	(United States) Duke Nalon	Kurtis Kraft-Novi	136.18	8	84	Supercharger		
26	32	73	(United States) Bob Sweikert R	Kurtis Kraft-Offenhauser	134.98	21	77	Differential		
27	1	28	(United States) Fred Agabashian	Kurtis Kraft-Cummins diesel	138.01	3	71	Turbocharger		
28	18	67	(United States) Gene Hartley	Kurtis Kraft-Offenhauser	134.34	24	65	Exhaust		
29	25	93	(United States) Bob Scott R	Kurtis Kraft-Offenhauser	133.95	31	49	Transmission		
30	27	21	(United States) Chet Miller	Kurtis Kraft-Novi	139.03	1	41	Supercharger		
31	19	12	(Italy) Alberto Ascari R	Ferrari	134.30	25	40	Wheel		
32	17	55	(United States) Bobby Ball	Stevens-Offenhauser	134.72	23	34	Gearbox		
33	2	9	(United States) Andy Linden	Kurtis Kraft-Offenhauser	137.00	4	20	Oil Pump		

W Former Indianapolis 500 winner

R Indianapolis 500 Rookie

All entrants utilized Firestone tires.

^1 – 1 point for fastest lead lap

=== Race statistics ===
Lap Leaders
Laps	Leader
1–6	Jack McGrath
7–11	Bill Vukovich
12	Troy Ruttman
13–61	Bill Vukovich
62–82	Troy Ruttman
83–134	Bill Vukovich
135–147	Troy Ruttman
148–191	Bill Vukovich
192–200	Troy Ruttman

Total laps led
Driver	Laps
Bill Vukovich	150
Troy Ruttman	44
Jack McGrath	6

Yellow Lights: 2 minutes
Laps*	Reason
40	Alberto Ascari spin in turn 3 (50 seconds)
191	Bill Vukovich against the wall in turn 2 (1:10)
* – Approximate lap counts

== Notes ==
- Pole position: Fred Agabashian – 4:20.85 (4 laps)
- Agabashian's Cummins Diesel Special was the first entry in the Indianapolis 500 to be powered by a turbocharged engine (then described as "turbosupercharged"). Gear-driven centrifugal blowers known as "superchargers" had been used since the 1920s to increase the volumetric efficiency and power output of racing engines, but the Cummins Diesel was the first to make use of the "free" energy contained in the engine exhaust stream to drive a turbine wheel connected to a centrifugal blower (thus, "turbo-supercharging").
- Fastest Lead Lap: Bill Vukovich – 1:06.60 (135.135 mph)
- As of 2022, Troy Ruttman remains the youngest driver to win the Indianapolis 500, at 22 years and 80 days.
- Ruttman also became the youngest driver to win a race counting for the World Championship of Drivers. His record was broken by Fernando Alonso at the 2003 Hungarian Grand Prix.
- 1952 was the only occasion when the fastest (Chet Miller) and slowest (Jim Rigsby) qualifiers for the race started next to each other.
- 1952 was the first Indy 500 in which not a single relief driver was utilized during the race.

== Broadcasting ==
=== Radio ===
The race was carried live on the radio on the Indianapolis Motor Speedway Radio Network. During the offseason, the Speedway management created the network to handle broadcasting duties in-house. The arrangement was under the flagship of 1070 WIBC-AM of Indianapolis, and featured a crew that consisted mostly of WIBC talent. WIBC landed exclusive rights of the broadcast in the Indianapolis market, which eventually would draw the ire of the other major stations in the area. In later years, the broadcast would be carried on all five stations inside the city, and they would utilize talent and crew representing each station.

Sid Collins served as booth announcer. Jim Shelton was among the turn reporters, reporting from turn 4. Gordon Graham reported from the pits and from victory lane. Like previous years, the broadcast featured live coverage of the start, the finish, and 15-minute live updates throughout the race. At least twenty stations around the county picked up the broadcast.

== World Drivers' Championship ==
1952 Indianapolis 500
Race 2 of 8 in the 1952 Formula One season
← Previous race	Next race →

Race details
- Date: May 30, 1952
- Location: Indianapolis Motor Speedway; Speedway, Indiana
- Course: Permanent racing facility
- Course length: 4.023 km (2.500 miles)
- Distance: 200 laps, 804.672 km (500.000 miles)

=== Background ===
The Indianapolis 500 was included in the FIA World Championship of Drivers from 1950 through 1960. The race was sanctioned by AAA through 1955, and then by USAC beginning in 1956. At the time the new world championship was announced and first organized by the CSI, the United States did not yet have a Grand Prix. Indianapolis Motor Speedway vice president and general manager Theodore E. "Pop" Meyers lobbied that the Indianapolis 500 be selected as the race to represent the country and to pay points towards the world championship.

Drivers competing at the Indianapolis 500 in 1950 through 1960 were credited with participation in and earned points towards the World Championship of Drivers. However, the machines competing at Indianapolis were not necessarily run to Formula One specifications and regulations. The drivers also earned separate points (on a different scale) towards the respective AAA or USAC national championships. No points, however, were awarded by the FIA towards the World Constructors' Championship.

=== Summary ===
The 1952 Indianapolis 500 was round 2 of 8 of the 1952 World Championship. Alberto Ascari, driving for Ferrari, competed in the race. He became the first European-based driver who was seriously competing for the World Championship to come to Indianapolis to race in the 500. In doing so, Ascari skipped the Swiss Grand Prix. He dropped out early and finished 31st. He failed to score any points, but he would go on to win the remaining seven races and won the world title. Race winner Troy Ruttman earned 8 points towards the World Championship and finished seventh in the final season standings.

==== World Drivers' Championship standings after the race ====
	Pos	Driver	Points
	1	(Italy) Piero Taruffi	9
20	2	(United States) Troy Ruttman	8
1	3	(Switzerland) Rudi Fischer	6
18	4	(United States) Jim Rathmann	6
2	5	(France) Jean Behra	4

- Note: Only the top five positions are included. Only the best 4 results counted towards the Championship.

Previous race: 1952 Swiss Grand Prix	FIA Formula One World Championship; 1952 season	Next race: 1952 Belgian Grand Prix
Previous race: 1951 Indianapolis 500; Lee Wallard	1952 Indianapolis 500; Troy Ruttman	Next race: 1953 Indianapolis 500; Bill Vukovich
Preceded by 126.244 mph (1951 Indianapolis 500)	Record for the Indianapolis 500 fastest average speed 128.922 mph	Succeeded by 130.840 mph (1954 Indianapolis 500)
