= Indianapolis 500 Rookie of the Year =

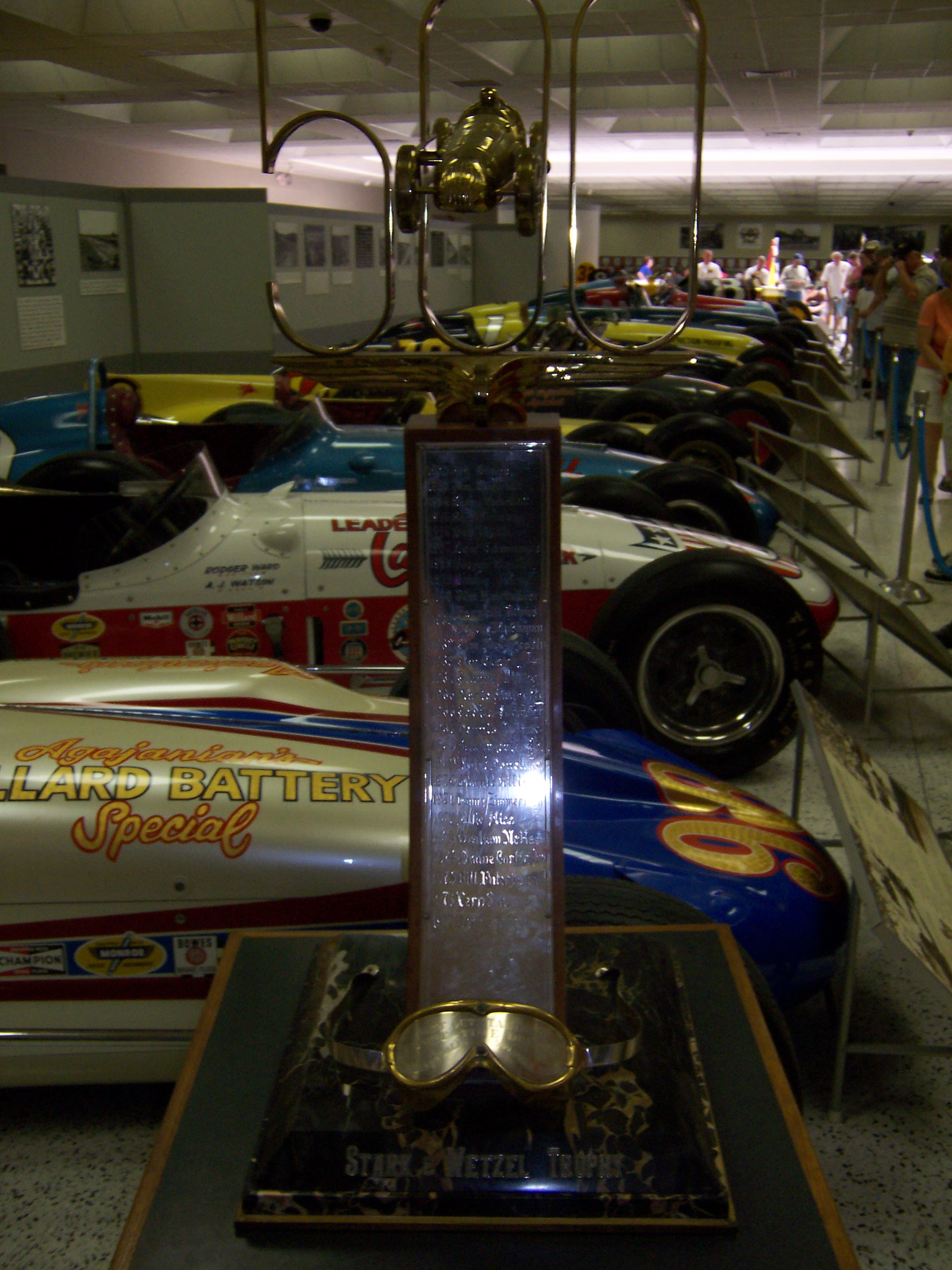
- Original Stark and Wetzel Rookie of the Year Award trophy on display at the Indianapolis Motor Speedway Hall of Fame Museum
- Sport: American open-wheel car racing
- Competition: Indianapolis 500
- Discipline: IndyCar Series
- Awarded for: "the driver who has performed with the most distinction among first-year drivers in the Indianapolis 500."

History
- First award: 1952
- Editions: 74
- First winner: (United States) Art Cross (1952)
- Most recent: (Germany) Mick Schumacher (2026)

The Indianapolis 500 Rookie of the Year is awarded annually to the racing driver deemed to have been the best performing rookie in the Indianapolis 500. Criteria include drivers' performance during practice, qualifying, and the race, their relationship with fans and the media, their sportsmanship and positive impact on the race. Sportsmanship is a driver's relationship with fellow racers and fans, and media interaction is their availability to spectators and the press during the event. The Indianapolis Motor Speedway (IMS) itself encourages voters of the award to treat each criterion equally. Competitors who outperform in their equipment during qualifying and the race, as well as those who led part of the event but retired for various reasons such as a mechanical failure or involved in an accident, can be given leeway by voters. The award is not always presented to the highest-finishing rookie, and it is not given if there are no rookie entrants. There is no current sponsor of the accolade; it has formerly been sponsored by Stark and Wetzel, American Fletcher National Bank, Bank One, Chase, and Sunoco.

The rules state that the driver must be a rookie who competes in qualifying and the race. Previous Indianapolis 500 racers and prize money winners are ineligible for the award at future events. According to earlier regulations, drivers were evaluated on their ability to follow United States Auto Club regulations, mental attitude, willingness to listen to advice from experts, actions to improve the welfare and safety of other competitors, and their own performance in qualifying and the race. In 1958, officials amended the regulations to make competitors who paid for or took part in prize money for one of the race's 33 starting spots eligible to compete for the award; this was done by redefining "appearance" in the rules following a two-car collision between Elmer George and Eddie Russo prior to the start of the 1957 race that resulted in differing opinions on whether the former was a rookie driver. The IMS disqualified drivers who crashed before the start of the 1958 Indianapolis 500 from competing for the accolade the following year.

The award was established before the 1952 Indianapolis 500 to reward rookie drivers for their performance in the race. Each year, after the race has ended, a small group of current and former media members, along with IndyCar Series and IMS officials, vote. They use a points-based voting system to choose their first and second choices. The winners' names are engraved on the Stark and Wetzel Rookie of the Year Award Trophy in the IMS Museum, and they receive $50,000 in cash and a cut glass trophy. (Note: The initial prize money award was $500, which was increased to $1,000 in 1968, to $2,000 in 1977, $5,000 in 1979, $10,000 in 1986, and finally to $25,000 in 1999. In 1990, the award winner received a glass replica of the IMS Permanent Rookie Trophy.) The Herff-Jones company spent $6,000 to create the 40-inch (1,000 mm)-tall trophy. (Note: $6,000 in 1952 equates to $72,744 in 2025, according to calculations based on the Consumer Price Index measure of inflation.) It has an onyx base with sterling rest googles and a sterling plate featuring the name and year of each recipient is mounted on a central walnut shaft. A sterling bar in the shape of the IMS official emblem (wings sprouting from a racing tire) adorns the trophy's head. The trophy features the number 500 in gold and a gold race car going through the middle numeral. The award is presented after the race at the Victory Banquet in Indianapolis. (Note: Before that, a dinner was held the following May to honor the previous year's award winner. A less formal gathering for award winners took place in later years.) Previous awards have included a plaque, a ring, and a year's worth of meat from Stark and Wetzel.

There have been 77 drivers who have won the accolade in the 71 years that it has been awarded. The first recipient was Art Cross in the 1952 race. It is typically given to one driver per year, but on five occasions it was awarded to two racers for their performance in a single race: Parnelli Jones and Bobby Marshman for 1961, Rick Mears and Larry Rice for 1978, Michael Andretti and Roberto Guerrero for 1984, Bernard Jourdain and Scott Pruett for 1989, and Alex Barron and Tomas Scheckter for 2002. (Note: Co-winners receive duplicate prizes including equal prize money and separate trophies.) American Lyn St. James became the first woman driver to win the award at the 1992 edition. Since then, two other women have won: Danica Patrick in 2005 and Simona de Silvestro in 2010. Juan Pablo Montoya (2000), Hélio Castroneves (2001) and Alexander Rossi (2016) are the three drivers who have won both the rookie prize and the race in the same calendar year. Josele Garza is the youngest winner of the award; he was 19 years and 70 days old when he won it after the 1981 event. The most recent winner was Mick Schumacher in the 2026 race.

== Rookie of the Year winners ==
Tire manufacturers
Symbol	Tire manufacturer
F	Firestone
G	Goodyear

Winners of the Indianapolis 500 Rookie of the Year
Year	Winner(s)	No.	Team(s)	Make/Model	Tire	Start	Finish	Distance and status				Ref
Year	Winner(s)	No.	Team(s)	Make/Model	Tire	Start	Finish	Laps	Mi	Km	Status	Ref
1952	Art Cross (USA)	33	Bowes Seal Fast / Ray Brady	Kurtis KK4000-Offenhauser	F	20	5	200	500	800	Running	
1953	Jimmy Daywalt (USA)	48	Sumar / Chapman Root	Kurtis KK3000-Offenhauser	F	21	6	200	500	800	Running	
1954	Larry Crockett (USA)	28	Federal Engineering	Kurtis KK3000-Offenhauser	F	25	9	200	500	800	Running	
1955	Al Herman (USA)	71	Martin Brothers	Silnes-Offenhauser	F	16	7	200	500	800	Running	
1956	Bob Veith (USA)	14	Federal Engineering	Kurtis KK500E-Offenhauser	F	23	7	200	500	800	Running	
1957	Don Edmunds (USA)	92	Roy McKay	Kurtis KK500G-Offenhauser	F	27	19	170	425	680	Spun out	
1958	George Amick (USA)	99	Norman C Demler	Epperly-Offenhauser	F	25	2	200	500	800	Running	
1959	Bobby Grim (USA)	48	Chapman S Root	Kurtis KK500G-Offenhauser	F	5	26	85	212.5	340	Magneto	
1960	Jim Hurtubise (USA)	56	Ernest L Ruiz	Christensen-Offenhauser	F	23	18	185	462.5	740	Rod	
1961	Parnelli Jones (USA)	98	J. C. Agajanian	Watson-Offenhauser	F	5	12	192	480	768	Running	
1961	Bobby Marshman (USA)	31	John R Wills	Watson-Offenhauser	F	33	7	200	500	800	Running	
1962	Jim McElreath (USA)	15	Ollie Prather	Kurtis-Offenhauser	F	7	6	200	500	800	Running	
1963	Jim Clark (GBR)	92	Team Lotus	Lotus 29-Ford	F	5	2	200	500	800	Running	
1964	Johnny White (USA)	99	Norman C Demler	Watson-Offenhauser	F	21	4	200	500	800	Running	
1965	Mario Andretti (USA)	12	Dean Van Lines Racing Division	Hawk I-Ford	F	4	3	200	500	800	Running	
1966	Jackie Stewart (GBR)	43	Mecom Racing Enterprises	Lola T90-Ford	F	11	6	190	475	760	Oil pressure	
1967	Denny Hulme (NZL)	69	Smokey Yunick	Eagle 67-Ford	G	24	4	197	492.5	788	Running	
1968	Bill Vukovich II (USA)	98	J. C. Agajanian	Shrike-Offenhauser	F	23	7	198	495	792	Running	
1969	Mark Donohue (USA)	66	US Racing	Lola T152-Ford	G	4	7	190	475	760	Running	
1970	Donnie Allison (USA)	14	Foyt-Greer Racing	Eagle 70-Ford	G	23	4	200	500	800	Running	
1971	Denny Zimmerman (USA)	43	Fiore Racing	Vollstedt-Offenhauser	F	28	8	189	472.5	756	Running	
1972	Mike Hiss (USA)	60	Page Racing Enterprises	Eagle 72-Offenhauser	G	25	7	196	490	784	Running	
1973	Graham McRae (NZL)	60	Patrick Racing	Eagle-Offenhauser	G	13	16	91	227.5	364	Header	
1974	Pancho Carter (USA)	11	Fletcher Racing	Eagle 74-Offenhauser	F	21	7	191	477.5	764	Running	
1975	Bill Puterbaugh (USA)	83	Lee Elkins	Eagle 75-Offenhauser	G	15	7	165	412.5	660	Running	
1976	Vern Schuppan (AUS)	9	Jorgensen Steel	Eagle 74-Offenhauser	G	17	18	97	242.5	388	Running	
1977	Jerry Sneva (USA)	36	James C Bidwell	McLaren M16C/D-Offenhauser	G	16	10	187	467.5	748	Running	
1978	Rick Mears (USA)	71	Penske Racing	Penske PC-6-Cosworth	G	3	23	97	242.5	388	Engine	
1978	Larry Rice (USA)	35	Pat Santello	Lightning-Offenhauser	G	30	11	181	452.5	724	Engine	
1979	Howdy Holmes (USA)	46	AMI Racing	Wildcat Mk2-Offenhauser	G	13	7	195	487.5	780	Running	
1980	Tim Richmond (USA)	21	Mach 1 Racing	Penske PC-7-Cosworth	G	19	9	195	487.5	780	Out of fuel	
1981	Josele Garza (MEX)	55	Psachie-Garza Racing	Penske PC-9-Cosworth	G	6	23	138	345	552	Accident	
1982	Jim Hickman (USA)	42	Rattlesnake Racing	March 81C-Cosworth	G	24	7	189	472.5	756	Running	
1983	Teo Fabi (ITA)	33	Forsythe Racing	March 83C-Cosworth	G	1	26	47	117.5	188	Fuel gasket	
1984	Michael Andretti (USA)	99	Kraco Racing	March 84C-Cosworth	G	4	5	198	495	792	Running	
1984	Roberto Guerrero (COL)	9	Bignotti-Cotter Racing	March 84C-Cosworth	G	7	2	198	495	792	Running	
1985	Arie Luyendyk (NLD)	61	Provimi Veal Racing	Lola T900-Cosworth	G	20	7	198	495	792	Running	
1986	Randy Lanier (USA)	12	Arciero Racing	March 86C-Cosworth	G	13	10	195	487.5	780	Running	
1987	Fabrizio Barbazza (ITA)	12	Arciero Racing	March 87C-Cosworth	G	17	3	198	495	792	Running	
1988	Billy Vukovich III (USA)	56	Gohr Racing	March 88C-Cosworth	G	23	14	179	447.5	716	Running	
1989	Bernard Jourdain (MEX)	69	Andale Racing	Lola T89/00-Cosworth	G	20	9	191	477.5	764	Running	
1989	Scott Pruett (USA)	3	Truesports	Lola T89/00-Judd	G	17	10	190	475	760	Running	
1990	Eddie Cheever (USA)	25	Chip Ganassi Racing	Penske PC-18-Chevrolet	G	14	8	193	482.5	772	Running	
1991	Jeff Andretti (USA)	86	Bayside Disposal Racing	Lola T91/00-Cosworth	G	11	15	150	375	600	Engine	
1992	Lyn St. James (USA)	90	Dick Simon Racing	Lola T91/00-Chevrolet	G	27	11	193	482.5	772	Running	
1993	Nigel Mansell (GBR)	5	Newman/Haas Racing	Lola T93/00-Ford	G	8	3	200	500	800	Running	
1994	Jacques Villeneuve (CAN)	12	Forsythe-Green Racing	Reynard 94I-Ford	G	4	2	200	500	800	Running	
1995	Christian Fittipaldi (BRA)	15	Walker Racing	Reynard 95I-Ford	G	27	2	200	500	800	Running	
1996	Tony Stewart (USA)	20	Team Menard	Lola T95/00-Buick/Menard	F	1	24	82	205	328	Engine	
1997	Jeff Ward (USA)	52	Team Cheever	G-Force GF01-Oldsmobile Aurora	F	7	3	200	500	800	Running	
1998	Steve Knapp (USA)	55	ISM Racing	Dallara IR7-Oldsmobile Aurora	G	23	3	200	500	800	Running	
1999	Robby McGehee (USA)	55	Conti Racing	Dallara IR7-Oldsmobile Aurora	F	27	5	199	497.5	796	Running	
2000	Juan Pablo Montoya (COL)	9	Chip Ganassi Racing	G-Force GF05-Oldsmobile Aurora	F	2	1	200	500	800	Running	
2001	Hélio Castroneves (BRA)	68	Team Penske	Dallara IR-01-Oldsmobile Aurora	F	11	1	200	500	800	Running	
2002	Alex Barron (USA)	44	Blair Racing	Dallara IR-01-Chevrolet	F	26	4	200	500	800	Running	
2002	Tomas Scheckter (ZAF)	52	Cheever Racing	Dallara IR-01-Infiniti	F	10	26	172	430	688	Accident	
2003	Tora Takagi (JPN)	12	Mo Nunn Racing	Panoz G-Force GF09-Toyota	F	7	5	200	500	800	Running	
2004	Kosuke Matsuura (JPN)	55	Super Aguri Fernández Racing	Panoz G-Force GF09-Honda	F	9	11	180	450	720	Running	
2005	Danica Patrick (USA)	16	Rahal Letterman Racing	Panoz G-Force GF09-Honda	F	4	4	200	500	800	Running	
2006	Marco Andretti (USA)	26	Andretti Green Racing	Dallara IR-03-Honda	F	9	2	200	500	800	Running	
2007	Phil Giebler (USA)	31	Playa Del Racing	Panoz G-Force GF09-Honda	F	33	29	106	265	424	Accident	
2008	Ryan Hunter-Reay (USA)	17	Rahal Letterman Racing	Dallara IR-05-Honda	F	20	6	200	500	800	Running	
2009	Alex Tagliani (CAN)	36	Conquest Racing	Dallara IR-05-Honda	F	33	11	200	500	800	Running	
2010	Simona de Silvestro (CHE)	78	HVM Racing	Dallara IR-05-Honda	F	22	14	200	500	800	Running	
2011	J. R. Hildebrand (USA)	4	Panther Racing	Dallara IR-05-Honda	F	12	2	200	500	800	Running	
2012	Rubens Barrichello (BRA)	8	KV Racing Technology	Dallara DW12-Chevrolet	F	10	11	200	500	800	Running	
2013	Carlos Muñoz (COL)	26	Andretti Autosport	Dallara DW12-Chevrolet	F	2	2	200	500	800	Running	
2014	Kurt Busch (USA)	26	Andretti Autosport	Dallara DW12-Honda	F	12	6	200	500	800	Running	
2015	Gabby Chaves (COL)	98	Bryan Herta Autosport	Dallara DW12-Honda	F	26	16	200	500	800	Running	
2016	Alexander Rossi (USA)	98	Andretti Herta Autosport	Dallara DW12-Honda	F	11	1	200	500	800	Running	
2017	Fernando Alonso (ESP)	29	McLaren-Honda-Andretti	Dallara DW12-Honda	F	5	24	179	447.5	716	Mechanical	
2018	Robert Wickens (CAN)	6	Schmidt Peterson Motorsports	Dallara DW12-Honda	F	18	9	200	500	800	Running	
2019	Santino Ferrucci (USA)	19	Dale Coyne Racing	Dallara DW12-Honda	F	23	7	200	500	800	Running	
2020	Pato O'Ward (MEX)	5	Arrow McLaren SP	Dallara DW12-Chevrolet	F	15	6	200	500	800	Running	
2021	Scott McLaughlin (NZL)	3	Team Penske	Dallara DW12-Chevrolet	F	17	20	200	500	800	Running	
2022	Jimmie Johnson (USA)	48	Chip Ganassi Racing	Dallara DW12-Honda	F	12	28	193	482.5	772	Contact	
2023	Benjamin Pedersen (DNK)	55	A. J. Foyt Racing	Dallara DW12-Chevrolet	F	11	21	196	490	784	Contact	
2024	Kyle Larson (USA)	17	Arrow McLaren w/ Rick Hendrick	Dallara DW12-Chevrolet	F	5	18	200	500	800	Running	
2025	Robert Shwartzman (ISR)	83	Prema Racing	Dallara DW12-Chevrolet	F	1	26	87	217.5	350	Contact	
2026	Mick Schumacher (DEU)	47	Rahal Letterman Lanigan Racing	Dallara DW12-Honda	F	27	18	200	500	800	Running	

=== Statistics ===
Winners by nationality
Licence	Winners
United States	49
Colombia	4
Brazil	3
Canada	3
Mexico	3
New Zealand	3
United Kingdom	3
Italy	2
Japan	2
Australia	1
Denmark	1
Germany	1
Israel	1
Netherlands	1
South Africa	1
Spain	1
Switzerland	1

== Fastest rookie qualifier ==
Since 1975, the American Dairy Association Indiana (ADA) has presented the Fastest Rookie of the Year award to the fastest rookie qualifier regardless of starting position or four-lap average speed in order to welcome and celebrate, and honor each rookie entrant in the Indianapolis 500. The quickest rookie qualifier receives $10,000, (Note: The payout for the fastest rookie qualifier award increased from $1,500 to $2,500 in 1981 and then $5,000 in 1994.) a commemorative poster, and a plaque at the annual ADA Fastest Rookie Luncheon. The driver's name is also inscribed on the IMS Museum's permanent Fastest Rookie trophy. There have been 50 winners of the award. The first winner was Bill Puterbaugh in the 1975 race, and the most recent winner was Mick Schumacher at the 2026 edition.

Key
#	Denotes a Fast Six Shootout qualifier
†	Denotes a Fast Nine Shootout qualifier
‡	Denotes a Top 12 Qualifying entrant

Tire manufacturers
Symbol	Tire manufacturer
F	Firestone
G	Goodyear

Winners of the Indianapolis 500 Fastest Rookie of the Year Award
Year	Winner	No.	Team	Make/Model	Tire	Final qualifying result				Finish	Ref
Year	Winner	No.	Team	Make/Model	Tire	Lap	MPH	KPH	Pos	Finish	Ref
1975	Bill Puterbaugh (USA)	83	Lee Elkins	Eagle 75-Offenhauser	G	3:15.83	183.333	295.046	15	7	
1976	Billy Scott (USA)	28	Hodgson Racing	Eagle 73-Offenhauser	G	3:16.31	183.383	295.126	21	23	
1977	Danny Ongais (USA)	25	Interscope Racing	Parnelli VPJ6B-Cosworth	G	3:06.49	193.040	310.668	7	20	
1978	Rick Mears (USA)	71	Team Penske	Penske PC-6-Cosworth	G	2:59.93	200.078	321.994	3	23	
1979	Howdy Holmes (USA)	46	AMI Racing	Wildcat Mk2-Offenhauser	G	3:13.69	185.864	299.119	13	7	
1980	Tim Richmond (USA)	21	Mach 1 Racing	Penske PC-7-Cosworth	G	3:11.15	188.334	303.094	19	9	
1981	Josele Garza (MEX)	55	Psachie-Garza Racing	Penske PC-9-Cosworth	G	3:04.52	195.101	313.985	6	23	
1982	Chip Ganassi (USA)	12	Rhoades Racing	Wildcat Mk8-Cosworth	G	3:02.09	197.704	318.174	11	15	
1983	Teo Fabi (ITA)	33	Forsythe Racing	March 83C-Cosworth	G	2:53.582	207.395	333.770	1	26	
1984	Michael Andretti (USA)	99	Kraco Racing	March 84C-Cosworth	G	2:53.239	207.805	334.430	4	5	
1985	Raul Boesel (BRA)	23	Dick Simon Racing	March 85C-Cosworth	G	2:54.336	206.498	332.326	23	18	
1986	Randy Lanier (USA)	12	Arciero Racing	March 86C-Cosworth	G	2:51.458	209.964	337.904	13	10	
1987	Davy Jones (USA)	44	A. J. Foyt Enterprises	March 86C-Cosworth	G	2:52.980	208.117	334.932	28	28	
1988	Dominic Dobson (USA)	92	Dobson Motorsports	Lola T87/00-Cosworth	G	2:51.350	210.096	338.117	21	18	
1989	John Jones (CAN)	65	Protofab Racing	Lola T89/00-Cosworth	G	2:48.202	214.028	344.445	25	11	
1990	Eddie Cheever (USA)	25	Chip Ganassi Racing	Penske PC-18-Chevrolet	G	2:45.194	217.926	350.716	14	8	
1991	Mike Groff (USA)	50	Euromotorsport	Lola T91/00-Cosworth	G	2:44.372	219.015	352.470	18	24	
1992	Jimmy Vasser (USA)	47	Hayhoe Racing	Lola T91/00-Cosworth	G	2:41.934	222.313	357.778	28	21	
1993	Stéphan Grégoire (FRA)	36	Formula Project Engineering	Lola T92/00-Buick	G	2:43.006	220.851	355.425	15	19	
1994	Jacques Villeneuve (CAN)	12	Forsythe-Green Racing	Reynard 94I-Ford	G	2:39.110	226.259	364.129	4	2	
1995	André Ribeiro (BRA)	31	Tasman Motorsports	Reynard 95I-Honda	F	2:38.944	226.495	364.508	12	18	
1996	Tony Stewart (USA)	20	Team Menard	Lola T95/00-Buick/Menard	F	2:34.440	233.100	375.138	1 (Note: Scott Brayton was the fastest in qualifying, but his car was taken over by Danny Ongais after he died in a practice accident. This promoted Stewart to the pole position.)	24	
1997	Vincenzo Sospiri (ITA)	8	Team Scandia	Dallara IR7-Oldsmobile Aurora	G	2:46.035	216.822	348.941	3	17	
1998	Jimmy Kite (USA)	7	Team Scandia	Dallara IR7-Oldsmobile Aurora	F	2:44.166	219.290	352.913	26	11	
1999	John Hollansworth Jr. (USA)	42	Team Xtreme	Dallara IR7-Oldsmobile Aurora	F	2:42.383	221.698	356.788	12	13	
2000	Juan Pablo Montoya (COL)	9	Chip Ganassi Racing	G-Force GF05-Oldsmobile Aurora	F	2:41.166	223.372	359.482	2	1	
2001	Bruno Junqueira (BRA)	50	Chip Ganassi Racing	G-Force GF05-Oldsmobile Aurora	F	2:40.5651	224.208	360.828	20	5	
2002	Tony Kanaan (BRA)	17	Mo Nunn Racing	G-Force GF05-Chevrolet	F	2:36.3499	230.253	370.556	5	28	
2003	Scott Dixon (NZL)	9	Chip Ganassi Racing	Panoz G-Force GF09-Toyota	F	2:36.4547	230.099	370.164	4	17	
2004	Kosuke Matsuura (JPN)	55	Super Aguri Fernández Racing	Panoz G-Force GF09-Honda	F	2:43.0878	220.740	355.247	9	11	
2005	Danica Patrick (USA)	16	Rahal Letterman Racing	Panoz G-Force GF09-Honda	F	2:38.5875	227.004	365.328	4	4	
2006	Marco Andretti (USA)	26	Andretti Green Racing	Dallara IR-03-Honda	F	2:40.0586	224.918	361.970	9	2	
2007	Phil Giebler (USA)	31	Playa Del Racing	Panoz G-Force GF09-Honda	F	2:43.9071	219.637	353.471	33	29	
2008	Hideki Mutoh (JPN)	27	Andretti Green Racing	Dallara IR-05-Honda	F	2:40.7952	223.887	360.311	9	7	
2009	Raphael Matos (BRA)	2	Luczo Dragon Racing	Dallara IR-05-Honda	F	2:41.1252	223.429	359.574	12	22	
2010	Mario Romancini (BRA)	34	Conquest Racing	Dallara IR-05-Honda	F	2:40.2557	224.641	361.525	27	13	
2011	J. R. Hildebrand (USA)	23	Panther Racing	Dallara IR-05-Honda	F	2:39.5895	225.579	363.064	12	2	
2012	Josef Newgarden (USA)†	67	Sarah Fisher Hartman Racing	Dallara DW12-Honda	F	2:40.2298	224.677	361.583	7	25	
2013	Carlos Muñoz (COL)†	26	Andretti Autosport	Dallara DW12-Chevrolet	F	2:37.6581	228.342	367.481	2	2	
2014	Kurt Busch (USA)	26	Andretti Autosport	Dallara DW12-Honda	F	2:35.9913	230.782	371.408	12	6	
2015	Gabby Chaves (COL)	98	Bryan Herta Autosport	Dallara DW12-Honda	F	2:41.4958	222.916	358.749	26	16	
2016	Alexander Rossi (USA)	98	Andretti Herta Autosport	Dallara DW12-Honda	F	2:37.5679	228.473	367.692	11	1	
2017	Fernando Alonso (ESP)†	29	McLaren-Honda-Andretti	Dallara DW12-Honda	F	2:35.6423	231.300	372.241	5	24	
2018	Matheus Leist (BRA)	4	A. J. Foyt Enterprises	Dallara DW12-Chevrolet	F	2:38.1922	227.571	366.240	11	13	
2019	Colton Herta (USA)†	88	Harding Steinbrenner Racing	Dallara DW12-Honda	F	2:37.1465	229.086	368.678	5	33	
2020	Rinus VeeKay (NLD)†	21	Ed Carpenter Racing	Dallara DW12-Chevrolet	F	2:36.0438	230.704	371.282	4	20	
2021	Pietro Fittipaldi (BRA)	51	Dale Coyne Racing with RWR	Dallara DW12-Honda	F	2:35.9481	230.846	371.511	13	25	
2022	Romain Grosjean (FRA)‡	28	Andretti Autosport	Dallara DW12-Honda	F	2:35.1729	231.999	373.366	9	31	
2023	Benjamin Pedersen (DNK)‡	55	A. J. Foyt Racing	Dallara DW12-Chevrolet	F	2:34.7246	232.671	374.448	11	21	
2024	Kyle Larson (USA)#	17	Arrow McLaren with Rick Hendrick	Dallara DW12-Chevrolet	F	2:34.6083	232.846	374.729	5	18	
2025	Robert Shwartzman (ISR)#	83	Prema Racing	Dallara DW12-Chevrolet	F	2:34.6459	232.790	374.639	1	26	
2026	Mick Schumacher (DEU)	47	Rahal Letterman Lanigan Racing	Dallara DW12-Honda	F	2:36.8969	229.450	369.264	27	18	

=== Statistics ===
Winners by nationality
Licence	Winners
United States	26
Brazil	8
Colombia	3
Canada	2
France	2
Italy	2
Japan	2
Denmark	1
Germany	1
Israel	1
Mexico	1
Netherlands	1
New Zealand	1
Spain	1

== See also ==
- IndyCar Rookie of the Year
