= Frank DelRoy =

American auto racing official

- Born: Frank DeRosa; November 7, 1912; Philadelphia, Pennsylvania, U.S.
- Died: April 23, 1978 (aged 65); Rush County, Indiana, U.S.
- Resting place: Crown Hill Cemetery and Arboretum, Section 224, Lot 866
- Occupations: Auto racing official Auto racing mechanic

Frank Jerry DelRoy (born Frank DeRosa, November 7, 1912 – April 23, 1978) was an American auto racing official and race car builder.

== Early life ==
DelRoy was born in Philadelphia, Pennsylvania. He was raised in Paterson, New Jersey, the location of racing's original "Gasoline Alley."

== Career ==
DelRoy began his racing career at age 18, while serving as a chauffeur in Madison, New Jersey. He served as riding mechanic for the pole-winning car of Bill Cummings at the 1937 Indianapolis 500. After his time serving as a riding mechanic, DelRoy worked in a purely off-track capacity for racers such as Ted Horn and Mike Nazaruk.

In 1958, DelRoy was hired as a technical official by the newly-formed United States Auto Club (USAC). In 1970 he was appointed USAC's Technical Director. His responsibilities included control over certification of cars for the Indianapolis 500.

DelRoy's cars competed in one round of the FIA World Championship - the 1953 Indianapolis 500.

== Death and legacy ==
On April 23, 1978, DelRoy – by then Chairman of the USAC Technical Committee – along with a pilot and seven other USAC officials, was killed when his flight home from a race in Trenton, New Jersey, crashed in a farm field south of Indianapolis, Indiana.

In 2017, DelRoy was elected to the USAC Hall of Fame.

== Select Indianapolis 500 results ==
Season	Driver	Grid	Classification	Points	Note	Race Report
1953	Johnny Thomson	33	Ret		Ignition	Report
