= Ernie McCoy =

Ernie McCoy may refer to:

- Ernie McCoy (racing driver) (1921–2001), American racecar driver
- Ernie McCoy (athletic director) (1904–1980), American collegiate athletic director
