= 1953 Indianapolis 500 =

American motor race

37th Indianapolis 500
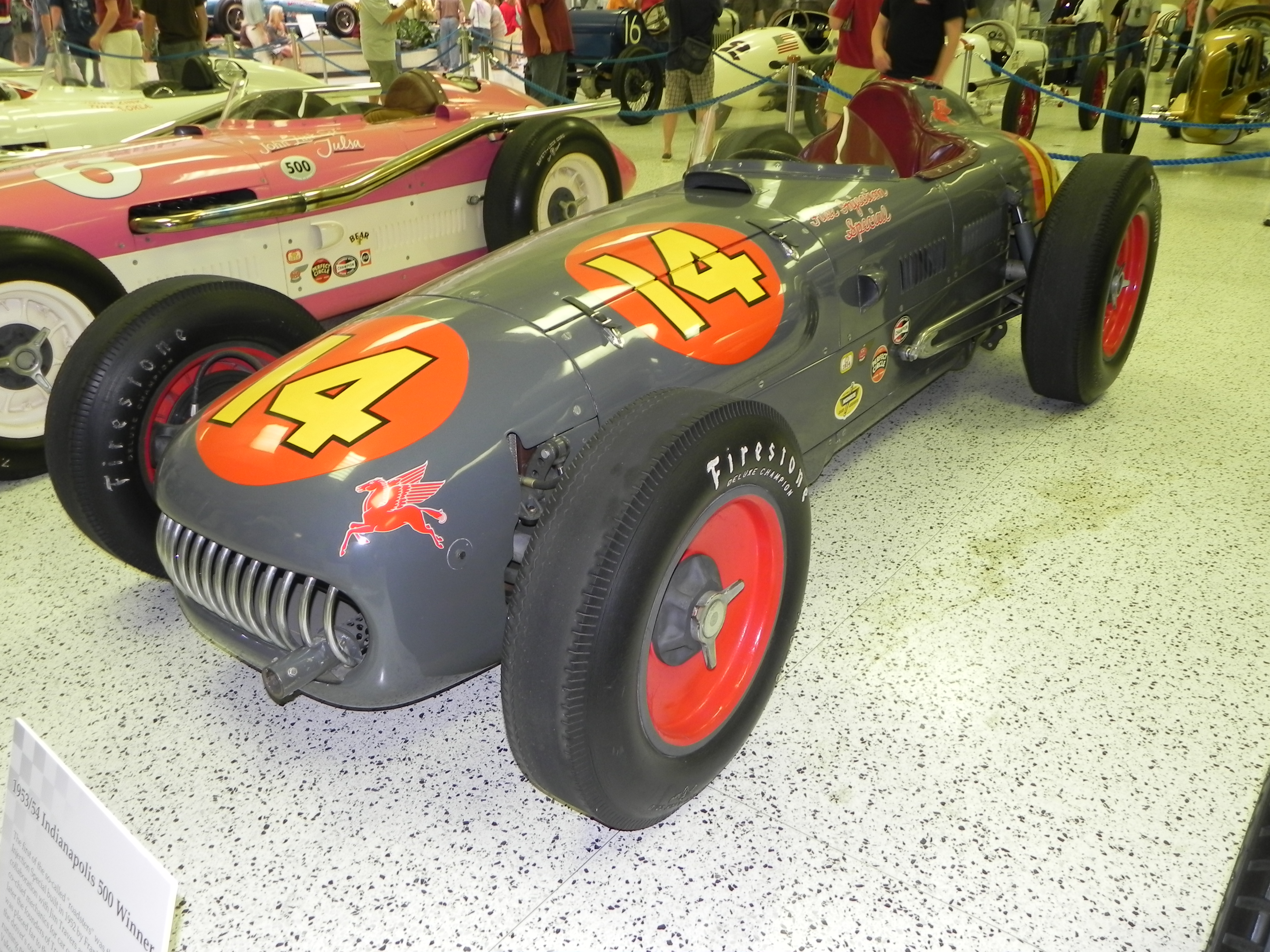

Indianapolis Motor Speedway

Indianapolis 500
- Sanctioning body: AAA
- Date: May 30, 1953
- Winner: Bill Vukovich
- Winning Entrant: Howard Keck
- Winning Chief Mechanic: Frank Coon & Jim Travers
- Winning time: 3:53:01.69
- Average speed: 128.740 mph (207.187 km/h)
- Pole position: Bill Vukovich
- Pole speed: 138.392 mph (222.720 km/h)
- Most laps led: Bill Vukovich (195)

Pre-race
- Pace car: Ford Crestline Sunliner
- Pace car driver: William Clay Ford
- Starter: Seth Klein
- Honorary referee: Henry Ford II
- Estimated attendance: 190,000

Chronology
Previous	Next
1952	1954

The 37th International 500-Mile Sweepstakes was held at the Indianapolis Motor Speedway on Saturday, May 30, 1953. The event was part of the 1953 AAA National Championship, and was race 2 of 9 in the 1953 World Championship of Drivers. Bill Vukovich, after falling just short a year before, dominated the race, leading 195 of the 200 laps. Vukovich won the first of two consecutive "500" victories, finishing more than three minutes ahead of second place Art Cross.

With the temperature in the high 90s (°F), and the track temperature exceeding 130 °F (54 °C), this race is often known as the "Hottest 500." Only twelve cars were running at the finish. Many starters needed relief drivers, and some relief drivers required their own relief drivers. Vukovich and Cross, however, both ran the full 500 miles solo. Owing to the excruciating conditions, driver Carl Scarborough dropped out of the race, and later died at the infield hospital due to heat prostration. Not only were drivers and crew members suffering from the intense heat, but spectators as well. According to one of the doctors at the infield hospital, the number of persons requiring treatment at the hospital was "beyond comprehension". This included at least eleven members of the Purdue Band, who marched and performed during pre-race ceremonies.

== Time trials ==
On Friday May 15, one day prior to the opening of time trials, sixteen-year race veteran Chet Miller died in a crash in turn one. Going into the race, Miller was the 1-lap (139.600 mph) and 4-lap (139.034 mph) track record holder (139.600 mph), a mark that he set in 1952. After completing a fast lap of over 138 mph, Miller went low going into turn one. The back end got loose, then the car turned to the right and drove head-on into the outside retaining wall. The car slid along the outside wall for about 100 yards, and came to rest in the south short chute. Miller, was found dead of a basal skull fracture and brain hemorrhage and likely was killed instantly.

=== Saturday May 16 ===
The first day of time trials was scheduled for Saturday May 15, but was rained out. Pole qualifying was rescheduled for Sunday at 12 p.m.

=== Sunday May 17 ===
Morning rain delayed the start of time trials until about 2:20 p.m. Only twelve drivers managed to take to the track, and seven completed a qualifying attempt. Manny Ayulo was the first driver in the field, completing his run at a speed of 136.384 mph. Bill Vukovich won the pole position with a four-lap average speed of 138.392 mph, which was not a new track record. Vukovich famously completed his qualifying run in the rain. On his third lap, his car slid sideways going into turn one due to increasing dampness, but he stayed with it. On his fourth and final lap, as Vukovich was coming out of turn four, the skies opened up and a downpour ensued. The speed on his last lap slipped to 137 mph, but he nevertheless took the checkered flag. The track was closed and Vukovich secured the pole position.

Pos	No.	Name	Lap 1 (mph)	Lap 2 (mph)	Lap 3 (mph)	Lap 4 (mph)	Average Speed (mph)
1	14	Bill Vukovich	139.147	138.568	138.739	137.132	138.392
2	59	Fred Agabashian	137.405	138.376	137.279	137.132	137.546
3	59	Jack McGrath	136.674	137.153	136.405	136.178	136.602
4	88	Manny Ayulo	136.240	136.075	136.6956	136.529	136.384
5	32	Andy Linden	135.196	135.726	136.446	136.882	136.060
6	32	Tony Bettenhausen	135.583	136.529	135.952	136.033	136.024
7	55	Jerry Hoyt	135.952	135.399	135.890	135.685	135.731
—	76	George Fonder	wave off (twice)				—
—	16	Art Cross	wave off				—
—	3	Sam Hanks	wave off				—
—	62	Spider Webb	wave off				—
—	4	Duane Carter	did not take green flag				—

- Source: The Indianapolis Star

=== Saturday May 23 ===
The third day of time trials opened with 26 spots still open in the starting grid. With as many as 66 cars in the paddock looking for a chance to qualify, the schedule for time trials was extended to 10 a.m. to 7 p.m. A very busy day saw 45 total qualifying attempts; 27 cars completed an attempt. The field was filled to 33 cars, and one car (Joe Barzda) was bumped.

Johnnie Parsons, the 1950 winner, was the fastest driver of the day. His speed of 137.667 mph wound up being the third-fastest overall in the field, but as a third day qualifier, he was forced to line up in 8th starting spot (middle of row 3). The threat of rain added to the urgency of the day. However, the rain held off throughout most of the afternoon. Two drivers (Marshall Teague and Eddie Johnson) exhausted all three of their allotted attempts. Teague slid sideways in turn two during his attempt, but would hold on to make the field. Johnson would later be bumped.

No incidents were reported during the day. Art Cross threw a rod during his first attempt. He took over the car of Jimmy Reece, and qualified 12th. Among those not yet in the field was Henry Banks.

Pos	No.	Name	Lap 1 (mph)	Lap 2 (mph)	Lap 3 (mph)	Lap 4 (mph)	Average Speed (mph)	Notes
8	21	Johnnie Parsons	137.447	138.079	138.079	137.070	137.667	
9	3	Sam Hanks	137.573	137.510	137.783	137.259	137.531	
10	92	Rodger Ward	137.636	137.678	137.342	137.216	137.468	
11	29	Bob Scott	136.633	138.525	138.058	136.529	137.431	
12	16	Art Cross	136.157	137.552	137.994	137.552	137.310	
13	41	Gene Hartley	137.741	137.489	136.882	136.945	137.263	
14	23	Walt Faulkner	137.258	137.342	137.195	136.674	137.117	
15	38	Don Freeland	136.934	136.426	137.531	136.591	136.867	
16	97	Chuck Stevenson	135.767	136.674	136.861	136.945	136.560	
17	7	Paul Russo	136.219	136.116	136.737	135.808	136.219	
18	62	Spider Webb	135.501	136.550	136.157	136.467	136.168	
19	73	Carl Scarborough	135.014	135.952	136.116	136.674	135.936	
20	12	Ernie McCoy	135.583	135.767	136.654	135.706	135.926	
21	48	Jimmy Daywalt	135.747	135.767	135.522	135.952	135.747	
22	22	Marshall Teague	135.379	135.281	135.911	135.318	135.721	
23	83	Mike Nazaruk	135.095	135.583	135.706	136.446	135.706	
24	77	Pat Flaherty	136.612	136.137	135.014	134.912	135.668	
25	2	Jim Rathmann	136.116	135.767	135.237	135.542	135.666	
26	9	Duke Nalon	135.338	135.788	135.277	135.440	135.461	
27	4	Duane Carter	135.440	134.912	135.665	135.054	135.267	
Failed to Qualify
—	26	Eddie Johnson	134.811	135.318	135.706	135.115	135.237	Bumped on 5/24
—	78	Cal Niday	134.852	135.420	134.389	135.054	134.827	Bumped on 5/24
—	36	Potsy Goacher	134.409	134.368	134.933	134.771	134.620	Bumped on 5/24
—	61	Bill Holland	134.329	134.934	134.088	134.409	134.439	Bumped on 5/24
—	74	Pat O'Connor	133.929	134.933	134.751	133.849	134.363	Bumped on 5/24
—	31	Len Duncan	133.909	133.018	133.591	133.432	133.487	Bumped on 5/24
—	69	Joe Barzda					121.918	Bumped by Holland

- Source: The Indianapolis Star

=== Sunday May 24 ===
Bump Day, the fourth and final day of time trials, was held on Sunday May 24. With the field already filled to 33 cars, the bumping process began right away. A total of six cars were bumped. Len Duncan was the first driver bumped for the day, after the successful run of Jimmy Bryan. Duncan later got in a backup car, but wrecked it in a practice run. Frank Armi spun out in turn two and also failed to make the race. Both Duncan and Armi would return to the make the race in 1954.

Bill Holland, the 1949 winner, returned to Indianapolis after being suspended by AAA for competing in "outlaw" races. Holland's car from the previous Sunday was bumped, but he took over the John Finch machine. He put in a speed of 137.868 mph, and became the second-fastest car overall in the field. Johnnie Tolan got out on the track with five seconds left before the 7 o'clock gun. His speed of 134.852 mph, however, was too slow to make the field.

Pos	No.	Name	Lap 1 (mph)	Lap 2 (mph)	Lap 3 (mph)	Lap 4 (mph)	Average Speed (mph)	Notes
28	69	Bill Holland	138.291	138.782	138.122	136.302	137.868	Bumps Goacher
29	51	Bob Sweikert	136.945	136.778	136.924	136.841	136.872	Bumps Holland
30	99	Cal Niday	135.624	136.075	136.405	136.405	136.096	Bumps Johnson
31	8	Jimmy Bryan	133.665	135.870	135.257	135.237	135.506	Bumps Duncan
32	53	Jimmy Davies	135.014	134.610	135.583	136.013	135.303	Bumps Niday
33	56	Johnny Thomson	136.116	136.100	134.791	134.068	135.262	Bumps O'Connor
Failed to Qualify
—	85	Johnnie Tolan					134.852	
—	63	Danny Oakes						
—	10	Henry Banks						
—	74	Pat O'Connor						
—	76	George Fonder						
—	65	George Tichenor						

- Source: The Indianapolis Star

=== Carburetion Day - Tuesday May 26 ===
The final practice was held on Tuesday May 26 in hot conditions. The ambient temperature topped out at 89 °F (32 °C), with a track temperature of 113 °F (45 °C). It would be a precursor for the hot weather in the forecast for race day.

== Starting grid ==
Row	Inside		Middle		Outside	
1	14	(United States) Bill Vukovich	59	(United States) Fred Agabashian	5	(United States) Jack McGrath
2	88	(United States) Manny Ayulo	32	(United States) Andy Linden	98	(United States) Tony Bettenhausen
3	55	(United States) Jerry Hoyt	21	(United States) Johnnie Parsons W	3	(United States) Sam Hanks
4	92	(United States) Rodger Ward	29	(United States) Bob Scott	16	(United States) Art Cross
5	41	(United States) Gene Hartley	23	(United States) Walt Faulkner	38	(United States) Don Freeland R
6	97	(United States) Chuck Stevenson	7	(United States) Paul Russo	62	(United States) Spider Webb
7	73	(United States) Carl Scarborough	12	(United States) Ernie McCoy R	48	(United States) Jimmy Daywalt R
8	22	(United States) Marshall Teague R	83	(United States) Mike Nazaruk	77	(United States) Pat Flaherty
9	2	(United States) Jim Rathmann	9	(United States) Duke Nalon	4	(United States) Duane Carter
10	49	(United States) Bill Holland W	51	(United States) Bob Sweikert	99	(United States) Cal Niday R
11	8	(United States) Jimmy Bryan	53	(United States) Jimmy Davies	56	(United States) Johnny Thomson R

R Indianapolis 500 rookie
W Indianapolis 500 winner

=== Alternates ===
- First alternate: Eddie Johnson (#26) – Bumped
- Second alternate: Johnnie Tolan R (#66, #85) – Too slow

=== Failed to qualify ===
All drivers from the United States unless stated.

- Joe Barzda R (#69) – Bumped
- Potsy Goacher R (#36) – Bumped
- Pat O'Connor R (#28, #64, #74) – Bumped
- Len Duncan R (#31, #81) – Bumped
- George Fonder (#76) – Wave off
- Danny Oakes R (#63) – Too slow
- Henry Banks (#10) – Unsuccessful attempt
- George Tichenor R (#65) – Unsuccessful attempt
- Frank Armi R (#79)
- Alberto Ascari (Italy) (#97) – Did not appear
- Buzz Barton R (#35)
- Bill Boyd R (#86)
- Billy Cantrell R (#42)
- Neal Carter R (#23)
- George Connor (#25)
- Ray Crawford R (#49)
- Jorge Daponte (Argentina) R (#95)
- Billy Devore (#28)
- Duke Dinsmore (#52)
- Bill Doster R
- Edgar Elder R (#49)
- Johnny Fedricks R (#46)
- John Fitch R (#49, #74)
- Gene Force (#48)
- Cliff Griffith (#24)
- Red Hamilton R (#91)
- Allen Heath (Canada) R (#65)
- Al Herman R (#93)
- Jackie Holmes (#71)
- Bill Homeier R (#84, #87)
- Johnny Kay R (#67)
- Jud Larson R (#96)
- Jim Mayes R (#34)
- Johnny Mauro (#47) – Did not appear
- Chet Miller (#15) – Fatal accident
- Roy Newman R (#43)
- Jimmy Reece (#16)
- Johnny Roberts R (#82)
- Hal Robson (Canada) (#57)
- Troy Ruttman W (#2)
- Eddie Sachs R (#34)
- Wayne Selser R (#75)
- Joe Sostilio R (#17)
- Harry Stockman R (#84)
- Bill Taylor R (#39)
- Leroy Warriner R (#44)
- Ebe Yoder R

== Race summary ==
=== First half ===
Race day dawned hot, with temperatures climbing into the 90s. The command to start engines was given at 10:54 a.m., and the field pulled away for the pace lap. At start, Bill Vukovich took the lead from the pole position, and led the field into turn one. Manny Ayulo and Tony Bettenhausen battled for second as Vukovich pulled out to a comfortable lead. On lap 4, Andy Linden crashed in turn three. Jerry Hoyt spun to the infield grass to avoid the wreck. Linden was out, but Hoyt was able to continue in the race. The yellow light stayed on for about one lap, and Linden was not injured.

Vukovich surrendered the lead during his first pit stop on lap 48. That put Fred Agabashian in the lead for one lap, followed by Jim Rathmann, then Sam Hanks for two laps. After the leaders cycled through their stops, Vukovich was back in the lead on lap 54. At the same time, Gene Hartley spun out in turn four bringing out the second yellow of the day. Hartley was taken to the infield hospital, but was released and would be able to serve as a relief driver later in the day.

The grueling conditions were starting to take a toll on the field. Several cars dropped out with mechanical problems before the halfway point. Jimmy Davies came into the pits without brakes, and brushed the inside wall to slow the car down. He would stay in the race to finish 10th, but several laps down. When Duke Nalon came in for his pit stop, his crew dumped a bucket of water over his head. On lap 70, Carl Scarborough came into the pits, feeling sick from the heat and fumes. Due to a fuel spill, a small fire broke out on the side of the car. The fire was quickly extinguished, and Scarborough climbed over the pit wall where he collapsed onto a chair. Bob Scott, who had already dropped out with an oil leak, took over behind the wheel. Scarborough was taken to the infield hospital where his temperature was recorded as 104 °F (40 °C). Physicians unsuccessfully performed open-heart massage, but he died of what was reported as heat prostration. According to speedway historian Donald Davidson, Scarborough may have inhaled carbon dioxide from the fire extinguishers, which may have contributed to, or been the actual cause of death.

With 80 laps completed, Bill Vukovich was still leading, with Art Cross second and Fred Agabashian third. Don Freeland lost a wheel in turn one on the leader's lap 81, and he spun down to the infield grass. He was unhurt, but the car was finished. Johnnie Parsons dropped out with a blown engine on lap 86, and Duane Carter was out with ignition problems.

=== Second half ===
At the halfway point, Bill Vukovich led with Fred Agabashian in second and Sam Hanks in third. Agabashian came in for a pit stop on lap 104. Agabashian was overcome by the heat and the engine fumes, and had to be replaced in the cockpit by relief driver Paul Russo. Jim Rathmann did the same, handing his car over to Eddie Johnson on lap 113. Vukovich came in for his second pit stop on lap 112, followed by Hanks four laps later. Back out on the track, Vukovich had a 50-second lead over Hanks.

Pat Flaherty hit the wall in the northchute on the leaders' lap 118. The yellow light was turned on for 6 minutes and 50 seconds to clean up the oil and fluids that spilled on the track. The next driver to fall by the wayside was Tony Bettenhausen. After completing 115 laps, Bettenhausen came into the pits signaling for a relief driver. Chuck Stevenson took over the car as Bettenhausen passed out and collapsed to the ground from the heat. After a lengthy period of rest, Jim Rathmann got back in the race. Rathmann took over the car of Bill Holland, but it ultimately broke down with a magneto failure.

At the 150-lap mark (375 miles), Bill Vukovich had lapped the field. Manny Ayulo was running second, and Sam Hanks in third. Ayulo's day ended after 184 laps with engine failure. Hanks came in on lap 151, and he was the next to need a relief driver. Duane Carter got behind the wheel, but the team lost considerable time as the crew had to repair a broken exhaust pipe before he could get the car back out. Marshall Teague came in on lap 169 needing assistance climbing out of the car. Cal Niday was preparing to take over behind the wheel, but in the meantime, the crew discovered an irreparable oil leak and the car was done for the day.

Bill Vukovich made his final pit stop on lap 171. Henry Banks was reportedly standing by in Vukovich's pit, with his helmet on ready to drive relief. Vukovich, however, refused the help and insisted on driving the full 500 miles solo. He drank a cup of water, poured some water down the back of his shirt, and went back out on the track. After witnessing this, radio network reporter Luke Walton labeled Vukovich the "ironman" of the race. Walton described the day as the "hottest day we've had in Hoosierland since Willkie accepted the nomination in Elwood back in 1940".

Vukovich cruised over the final 30 laps and won his first "500" by 3 minutes and 30 seconds (about 3 laps) over second place Art Cross. Duane Carter (driving the car of Sam Hanks) came home third, with Paul Russo (driving the car of Fred Agabashian) fourth. As Vukovich was headed to victory lane, the action on the track was still hot. Gene Hartley (driving Tony Bettenhausen's car) crashed, as did Duke Nalon. Officials flagged the race after the first eight cars finished. Only four other cars were still running.

== Box score ==
Finish	Grid	No.	Driver	Constructor	Qualifying		Laps	Status	Points	
Finish	Grid	No.	Driver	Constructor	Speed	Rank	Laps	Status	USAC	WDC
1	1	14	(United States) Bill Vukovich	Kurtis Kraft-Offenhauser	138.39	1	200	128.740 mph	1000	9^{1}
2	12	16	(United States) Art Cross	Kurtis Kraft-Offenhauser	137.31	8	200	+3:30.87	800	6
3	9	3	(United States) Sam Hanks (Duane Carter Laps 152–200)	Kurtis Kraft-Offenhauser	137.53	5	200	+4:11.50	532; 168	2; 2
4	2	59	(United States) Fred Agabashian (Paul Russo Laps 105–200)	Kurtis Kraft-Offenhauser	137.54	4	200	+4:39.24	315; 285	1.5; 1.5
5	3	5	(United States) Jack McGrath	Kurtis Kraft-Offenhauser	136.60	13	200	+7:49.64	500	2
6	21	48	(United States) Jimmy Daywalt R	Kurtis Kraft-Offenhauser	135.74	23	200	+8:10.21	400	
7	25	2	(United States) Jim Rathmann (Eddie Johnson Laps 113–200)	Kurtis Kraft-Offenhauser	135.66	27	200	+8:46.02	169½; 130½	
8	20	12	(United States) Ernie McCoy R	Stevens-Offenhauser	135.92	22	200	+10:04.55	250	
9	6	98	(United States) Tony Bettenhausen (Chuck Stevenson Laps 116–159) (Gene Hartley Laps 160–196)	Kuzma-Offenhauser	136.02	20	196	Accident	116; 45; 39	
10	32	53	(United States) Jimmy Davies	Kurtis Kraft-Offenhauser	135.26	31	193	-7 laps	150	
11	26	9	(United States) Duke Nalon	Kurtis Kraft-Novi	135.46	30	191	Accident	100	
12	19	73	(United States) Carl Scarborough ✝ (Bob Scott Laps 70–190)	Kurtis Kraft-Offenhauser	135.93	21	190	-10 laps	17½; 32½	
13	4	88	(United States) Manny Ayulo	Kuzma-Offenhauser	136.38	15	184	Engine		
14	31	8	(United States) Jimmy Bryan	Schroeder-Offenhauser	135.50	29	183	-17 laps		
15	28	49	(United States) Bill Holland W (Jim Rathmann Laps 142–177)	Kurtis Kraft-Offenhauser	137.86	2	177	Magneto		
16	10	92	(United States) Rodger Ward (Andy Linden Laps 116–144) (Duke Dinsmore Laps 145–154)	Kurtis Kraft-Offenhauser	137.46	6	177	Axle		
17	14	23	(United States) Walt Faulkner (Johnny Mantz Laps 135–)	Kurtis Kraft-Offenhauser	137.11	10	176	-24 laps		
18	22	22	(United States) Marshall Teague R	Kurtis Kraft-Offenhauser	135.72	25	169	Oil Leak		
19	18	62	(United States) Spider Webb (Johnny Thomson Laps 113–157) (Jackie Holmes Laps 158–166)	Kurtis Kraft-Offenhauser	136.16	17	166	Oil Leak		
20	29	51	(United States) Bob Sweikert	Kuzma-Offenhauser	136.87	11	151	Suspension		
21	23	83	(United States) Mike Nazaruk	Turner-Offenhauser	135.70	26	146	Transmission		
22	24	77	(United States) Pat Flaherty	Kuzma-Offenhauser	135.66	28	115	Accident		
23	7	55	(United States) Jerry Hoyt (Chuck Stevenson Laps 83–95) (Andy Linden Laps 96–107)	Kurtis Kraft-Offenhauser	135.73	24	107	Overheating		
24	27	4	(United States) Duane Carter	Lesovsky-Offenhauser	135.26	32	94	Ignition		
25	17	7	(United States) Paul Russo	Kurtis Kraft-Offenhauser	136.21	16	89	Magneto		
26	8	21	(United States) Johnnie Parsons W	Kurtis Kraft-Offenhauser	137.66	3	86	Engine		
27	15	38	(United States) Don Freeland R	Watson-Offenhauser	136.86	12	76	Accident		
28	13	41	(United States) Gene Hartley	Kurtis Kraft-Offenhauser	137.26	9	53	Accident		
29	16	97	(United States) Chuck Stevenson	Kuzma-Offenhauser	136.56	14	42	Fuel Leak		
30	30	99	(United States) Cal Niday R	Kurtis Kraft-Offenhauser	136.09	18	30	Magneto		
31	11	29	(United States) Bob Scott	Bromme-Offenhauser	137.43	7	14	Oil Leak		
32	33	56	(United States) Johnny Thomson R	Del Roy-Offenhauser	135.26	33	6	Ignition		
33	5	32	(United States) Andy Linden	Stevens-Offenhauser	136.06	19	3	Accident		

Note: Relief drivers in parentheses

W Former Indianapolis 500 winner

R Indianapolis 500 Rookie

All entrants utilized Firestone tires.

^1 – Includes 1 point for fastest lead lap

=== Race statistics ===
Lap Leaders
Laps	Leader
1–48	Bill Vukovich
49	Fred Agabashian
50	Jim Rathmann
51–53	Sam Hanks
54–200	Bill Vukovich

Total laps led
Driver	Laps
Bill Vukovich	195
Sam Hanks	3
Fred Agabashian	1
Jim Rathmann	1

Yellow Lights: 9 minutes, 28 seconds
Laps*	Reason
4	Andy Linden crash in turn 3 (55 seconds)
54	Gene Hartley spin in turn 4 (60 seconds)
81	Don Freeland lost a wheel in turn 1 (43 seconds)
118–122	Pat Flaherty crash in northchute (6:50)
* – Approximate lap counts

== Race notes ==
- Pole position: Bill Vukovich – 4:20.13 (4 laps)
- Fastest lead lap: Bill Vukovich – 1:06.240
- The purse for first place was $89,496 (US$1,076,957 in 2025 dollars).
- One of the prizes awarded to the winner was a pet dog and a year's supply of dog food.

== Broadcasting ==
=== Radio ===
The race was carried live flag-to-flag on the Indianapolis Motor Speedway Radio Network. Instead of being produced by 1070 WIBC-AM, the network pooled together talent and technical staff from all five of the major radio stations in Indianapolis. The broadcast was anchored by Sid Collins, and featured on-air talent from WIBC, WFBM, WISH, WIRE, and WXLW.

The broadcast signed on at 10:45 a.m. local time, and carried live through the conclusion, until 3:45 p.m. local time. The broadcast was carried on 135 stations in at least 35 states across the country, and on Armed Forced Network to Europe and Asia. Towards the end of the race, chief announcer Sid Collins departed the booth in order to report from victory lane. Charlie Brockman, the color commentator and co-announcer, called the last few laps including the finish.

Indianapolis Motor Speedway Radio Network
Booth Announcers	Turn Reporters	Pit/garage reporters
Chief Announcer: Sid Collins; Color: Charlie Brockman; Analyst: Chuck Breece	South Turns: Bill Frosch; North Turns: Jim Shelton; Trackside location: Dick Pittenger; Trackside location: Robin Bright	Luke Walton (north pits); Al Vare (south pits); Sid Collins (victory lane)

== World Drivers' Championship ==
1953 Indianapolis 500
Race 2 of 9 in the 1953 Formula One season
← Previous race	Next race →

Race details
- Date: May 30, 1953
- Location: Indianapolis Motor Speedway; Speedway, Indiana
- Course: Permanent racing facility
- Course length: 4.023 km (2.500 miles)
- Distance: 200 laps, 804.672 km (500.000 miles)

=== Background ===
The Indianapolis 500 was included in the FIA World Championship of Drivers from 1950 through 1960. The race was sanctioned by AAA through 1955, and then by USAC beginning in 1956. At the time the new world championship was announced and first organized by the CSI, the United States did not yet have a Grand Prix. Indianapolis Motor Speedway vice president and general manager Theodore E. "Pop" Meyers lobbied that the Indianapolis 500 be selected as the race to represent the country and to pay points towards the world championship.

Drivers competing at the Indianapolis 500 in 1950 through 1960 were credited with participation in and earned points towards the World Championship of Drivers. However, the machines competing at Indianapolis were not necessarily run to Formula One specifications and regulations. The drivers also earned separate points (on a different scale) towards the respective AAA or USAC national championships. No points, however, were awarded by the FIA towards the World Constructors' Championship.

=== Summary ===
The 1953 Indianapolis 500 was round 2 of 9 on the 1953 World Championship. The event, however, failed to attract interest from any of the regular competitors on the Grand Prix circuit. Race winner Bill Vukovich earned 9 points towards the World Championship (8 points for first place, and 1 point for the fastest lap). Despite not competing in any of the other World Championship events, he finished seventh in the final season standings.

==== World Drivers' Championship standings after the race ====
	Pos	Driver	Points
	1	(Italy) Alberto Ascari	9
16	2	(United States) Bill Vukovich	9
1	3	(Italy) Luigi Villoresi	6
14	4	(United States) Art Cross	6
2	5	(Argentina) José Froilán González	4

- Note: Only the top five positions are included. Only the best 4 results counted towards the Championship.

==== AAA Championship car standings after the race ====
Pos	Driver	Points
1	(United States) Bill Vukovich	1000
2	(United States) Art Cross	800
3	(United States) Sam Hanks	532
4	(United States) Jack McGrath	500
5	(United States) Jimmy Daywalt	400

- Note: Only the top five positions are included.

Previous race: 1953 Argentine Grand Prix	FIA Formula One World Championship; 1953 season	Next race: 1953 Dutch Grand Prix
Previous race: 1952 Indianapolis 500; Troy Ruttman	1953 Indianapolis 500; Bill Vukovich	Next race: 1954 Indianapolis 500; Bill Vukovich
