= Art Cross =

American racecar driver

- Born: Arthur Francis Cross; January 24, 1918; Jersey City, New Jersey, U.S.
- Died: April 15, 2005 (aged 87); LaPorte, Indiana, U.S.

Formula One World Championship career
- Nationality: (United States) American
- Active years: 1952–1955
- Team: Kurtis Kraft
- Entries: 4
- Championships: 0
- Wins: 0
- Podiums: 1
- Career points: 8
- Pole positions: 0
- Fastest laps: 0
- First entry: 1952 Indianapolis 500
- Last entry: 1955 Indianapolis 500

Arthur Francis Cross (January 24, 1918 – April 15, 2005) was an American racecar driver. He was the first recipient of the Indianapolis 500 Rookie of the Year Award in 1952.

== Racing career ==
Cross began racing midget cars in 1938. He served as a tank commander during the Second World War, and received a Purple Heart for his wounds during the Battle of the Bulge. He returned to midget cars after the war, and raced in one of Pappy Hough's "Little Iron Pigs."

Cross won the first Indy 500 Rookie of the Year award after a fifth-place finish in the 1952 Indianapolis 500. Cross used his share of $27,000 from the race to purchase a farm near LaPorte, Indiana.

Cross finished second in the 1953 Indianapolis 500 behind Bill Vukovich. Despite it being one of the hottest Indy 500s on record, Vukovich and Cross completed the entire race without relief. Driver Carl Scarborough died from the heat. Cross' car was the "Springfield Welding Special", which was owned by Bessie Lee Paoli, who was the only female owner at the time.

After retiring from racing, Cross turned his attention to running the farm in LaPorte, Indiana. He later became involved in a heavy equipment business and in construction. He was inducted in the National Midget Auto Racing Hall of Fame in 1992.

== Indianapolis 500 results ==
Year	Car	Start	Qual	Rank	Finish	Laps	Led	Retired
1952	33	20	134.288	26	5	200	0	Running
1953	16	12	137.310	8	2nd	200	0	Running
1954	45	27	138.675	14	11	200	8	Running
1955	99	24	138.750	23	17	168	24	Rod
Totals						768	32	

Starts	4
Poles	0
Front Row	0
Wins	0
Top 5	2
Top 10	2
Retired	1

== Complete Formula One World Championship results ==
(key)

Year	Entrant	Chassis	Engine	1	2	3	4	5	6	7	8	9	WDC	Points
1952	Bowes Seal Fast / Ray Brady	Kurtis Kraft 4000	Offenhauser L4	SUI	500; 5	BEL	FRA	GBR	GER	NED	ITA		20th=	2
1953	Springfield Welding / Paoli	Kurtis Kraft 4000	Offenhauser L4	ARG	500; 2	NED	BEL	FRA	GBR	GER	SUI	ITA	10th	6
1954	Bardahl / Ed Walsh	Kurtis Kraft 4000	Offenhauser L4	ARG	500; 11	BEL	FRA	GBR	GER	SUI	ITA	ESP	NC	0
1955	Bardahl / Ed Walsh	Kurtis Kraft 500C	Offenhauser L4	ARG	MON	500; 17	BEL	NED	GBR	ITA			NC	0

Sporting positions
Preceded by None	Indianapolis 500; Rookie of the Year; 1952	Succeeded by Jimmy Daywalt
