= 1954 Indianapolis 500 =

American motor race

38th Indianapolis 500
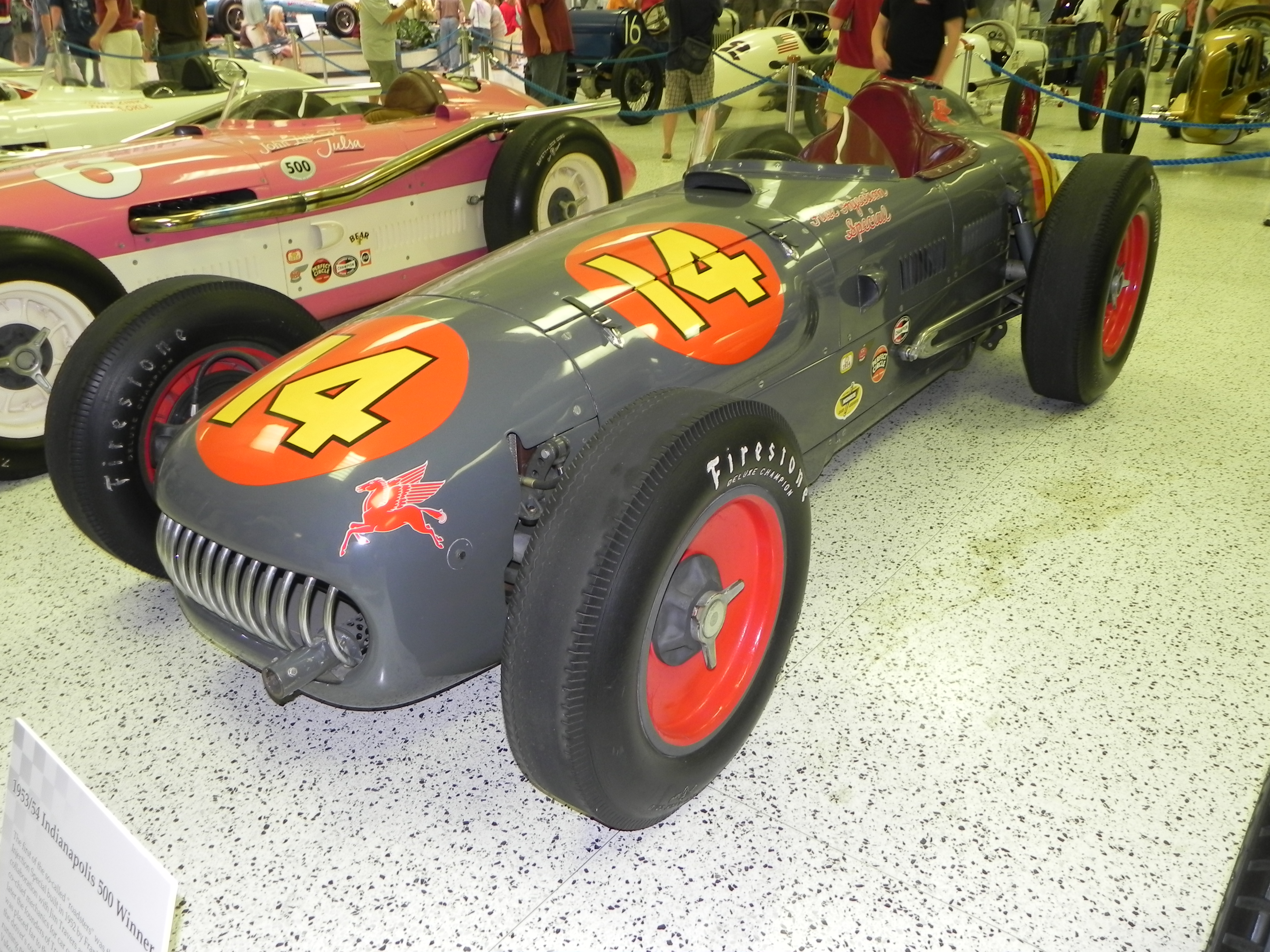

Indianapolis Motor Speedway

Indianapolis 500
- Sanctioning body: AAA
- Date: May 31, 1954
- Winner: Bill Vukovich
- Winning Entrant: Howard Keck
- Winning Chief Mechanic: Frank Coon & Jim Travers
- Winning time: 3:49:17.27
- Average speed: 130.840 mph (210.567 km/h)
- Pole position: Jack McGrath
- Pole speed: 141.033 mph (226.971 km/h)
- Most laps led: Bill Vukovich (90)

Pre-race
- Pace car: Dodge Royal 500
- Pace car driver: W. C. Newberg
- Starter: Bill Vanderwater
- Honorary referee: Ralph DePalma
- Estimated attendance: 175,000

Chronology
Previous	Next
1953	1955

The 38th International 500-Mile Sweepstakes was held at the Indianapolis Motor Speedway on Monday, May 31, 1954. The event was part of the 1954 AAA National Championship Trail, and was also race 2 of 9 in the 1954 World Championship of Drivers.

== Time trials ==
Time trials was scheduled for four days.

- Saturday May 15 – Pole Day time trials
- Sunday May 16 – Second day time trials
- Saturday May 22 – Third day time trials
- Sunday May 23 – Fourth day time trials

=== Bob Scott Qualifying Run ===
Late in the afternoon on the final day of time trials, Bob Scott was bumped from the field. With help from his friend Bob Sweikert, Scott was able to find a new car to qualify, the number 18 owned by Ray Brady. With only minutes left in time trials, Scott went on track to qualify. His first three laps were fast enough to bump into the starting lineup. As the sun was setting low in the sky, Scott was unable to see the flag waved by the flagman, having lost track of how many laps he had run, and mistook the white flag for the checkered flag. He also saw Sweikert waving his hands over his head, thinking Sweikert was congratulating him on the completion of his run. After only three of four required laps, Scott slowed and returned to the pits, thinking his run was over. Upon his return to the pits, Scott was informed what had happened. Scott and Sweikert were left in tears over the disappointment and realization over how much money was lost by missing the race. Scott died in a crash at Darlington Raceway over a month later.

== Starting grid ==
R = Indianapolis 500 rookie; W = Former Indianapolis 500 winner

Row	Inside		Middle		Outside	
1	2	(United States) Jack McGrath	19	(United States) Jimmy Daywalt	9	(United States) Jimmy Bryan
2	43	(United States) Johnny Thomson	98	(United States) Chuck Stevenson	7	(United States) Don Freeland
3	25	(United States) Jimmy Reece	16	(United States) Duane Carter	17	(United States) Bob Sweikert
4	1	(United States) Sam Hanks	34	(United States) Troy Ruttman W	35	(United States) Pat O'Connor R
5	24	(United States) Cal Niday	73	(United States) Mike Nazaruk	15	(United States) Johnnie Parsons W
6	12	(United States) Rodger Ward	31	(United States) Gene Hartley	51	(United States) Bill Homeier R
7	14	(United States) Bill Vukovich W	32	(United States) Ernie McCoy	10	(United States) Tony Bettenhausen
8	88	(United States) Manny Ayulo	74	(United States) Andy Linden	77	(United States) Fred Agabashian
9	28	(United States) Larry Crockett R	33	(United States) Len Duncan R	45	(United States) Art Cross
10	38	(United States) Jim Rathmann	65	(United States) Spider Webb	99	(United States) Jerry Hoyt
11	27	(United States) Ed Elisian R	5	(United States) Paul Russo	71	(United States) Frank Armi R

=== Alternates ===
- First alternate: Eddie Johnson (#26) — Johnson drove relief during the race

=== Failed to qualify ===
- Henry Banks (#26) - Retired
- Joe Barzda R (#54)
- Bill Boyd R (#47)
- Wally Campbell R (#66, #81) - Failed rookie test
- Bob Christie R (#66)
- George Connor (#27, #32) - Retired
- Ray Crawford R (#32) - Entry declined
- Jimmy Davies (#53)
- Billy Devore (#93)
- Duke Dinsmore (#62, #67)
- Walt Faulkner (#44, #97)
- Pat Flaherty (#39, #76, #89)
- Johnny Fedricks R (#89)
- George Fonder (#33, #36)
- Potsy Goacher R (#67)
- Cliff Griffith (#22)
- Al Herman R (#36)
- Bill Holland W #38)
- Frank Mundy R (#41)
- Duke Nalon (#8)
- Danny Oakes R (#47, #49)
- Eddie Russo R (#37)
- Eddie Sachs R (#54)
- Bob Scott (#18, #21)
- Joe Sostilio R (#45)
- Marshall Teague (#3)
- George Tichenor R (#22)
- Johnnie Tolan R (#69)
- Lee Wallard W (#99) - Retired
- Leroy Warriner (#67) - Withdrew, injured
- Chuck Weyant R (#52)

== Race summary ==
Bill Vukovich had to work much harder in this race due to his car was now 2 years old and the team had trouble getting it up to speed leading to a 19th place starting spot inside of row 7 for the race. Vukovich did not see the lead until lap 61 when he led 1 lap. He then after losing positions during pitstops worked his way forward, seeing the lead again on lap 92 leading for the next 38 laps until falling back due to another round of pitstops. Then Vukovich took the lead for good on 150 to win his second consecutive 500, setting a record (at the time) 130.840 mph average race speed. The record would stand until the 1957 Indianapolis 500. Vukovich died the following year attempting to win his third consecutive Indy 500.

== Box score ==
Finish	Grid	No.	Driver	Constructor	Qualifying		Laps	Status	Points	
Finish	Grid	No.	Driver	Constructor	Speed	Rank	Laps	Status	USAC	WDC
1	19	14	(United States) Bill Vukovich W	Kurtis Kraft-Offenhauser	138.47	14	200	130.840 mph	1,000	8
2	3	9	(United States) Jimmy Bryan	Kuzma-Offenhauser	139.66	5	200	+1:09.95	800	6
3	1	2	(United States) Jack McGrath	Kurtis Kraft-Offenhauser	141.03	1	200	+1:19.73	700	5^{1}
4	11	34	(United States) Troy Ruttman W (Duane Carter Laps 101–170)	Kurtis Kraft-Offenhauser	137.73	31	200	+2:52.68	387; 213	1.5; 1.5
5	14	73	(United States) Mike Nazaruk	Kurtis Kraft-Offenhauser	139.58	6	200	+3:24.55	500	2
6	24	77	(United States) Fred Agabashian	Kurtis Kraft-Offenhauser	137.74	30	200	+3:47.55	400	
7	6	7	(United States) Don Freeland	Phillips-Offenhauser	138.33	16	200	+4:13.35	300	
8	32	5	(United States) Paul Russo (Jerry Hoyt Laps 151–200)	Kurtis Kraft-Offenhauser	137.67	32	200	+5:01.17	187½; 62½	
9	25	28	(United States) Larry Crockett R	Kurtis Kraft-Offenhauser	139.55	8	200	+7:07.24	200	
10	13	24	(United States) Cal Niday	Stevens-Offenhauser	139.82	3	200	+7:07.69	150	
11	27	45	(United States) Art Cross (Johnnie Parsons Laps 121–142) (Sam Hanks Laps 143–153) (Andy Linden Laps 154–170) (Jimmy Davies Laps 171–200)	Kurtis Kraft-Offenhauser	138.67	13	200	+8:22.19	59½; 12½; 5½; 8; 14½	
12	5	98	(United States) Chuck Stevenson (Walt Faulkner Laps 56–94 (Walt Faulkner Laps 122–199)	Kuzma-Offenhauser	138.77	12	199	-1 Lap	21½; 28½	
13	22	88	(United States) Manny Ayulo	Kuzma-Offenhauser	138.16	22	197	-3 Laps		
14	9	17	(United States) Bob Sweikert	Kurtis Kraft-Offenhauser	138.20	21	197	-3 Laps		
15	8	16	(United States) Duane Carter (Marshall Teague Laps 77–105) (Jimmy Jackson Laps 106–120) (Tony Bettenhausen Laps 121–154) (Jimmy Jackson Laps 155–196)	Kurtis Kraft-Offenhauser	138.23	19	196	-4 Laps		
16	20	32	(United States) Ernie McCoy	Kurtis Kraft-Offenhauser	138.41	15	194	-6 Laps		
17	7	25	(United States) Jimmy Reece	Pankratz-Offenhauser	138.31	17	194	-6 Laps		
18	31	27	(United States) Ed Elisian R (Bob Scott Laps 149–193)	Stevens-Offenhauser	137.79	29	193	-7 Laps		
19	33	71	(United States) Frank Armi R (George Fonder Laps 141–164)	Kurtis Kraft-Offenhauser	137.67	33	193	-7 Laps		
20	10	1	(United States) Sam Hanks (Jimmy Davies Laps 113–148) (Jim Rathmann Laps 149–191)	Kurtis Kraft-Offenhauser	137.99	25	191	Spun Off		
21	12	35	(United States) Pat O'Connor R	Kurtis Kraft-Offenhauser	138.08	23	181	Spun Off		
22	16	12	(United States) Rodger Ward (Eddie Johnson Laps 94–160)	Pawl-Offenhauser	139.92	2	172	Retirement		
23	17	31	(United States) Gene Hartley (Marshall Teague Laps 152–168)	Kurtis Kraft-Offenhauser	139.06	10	168	Clutch		
24	4	43	(United States) Johnny Thomson (Andy Linden Laps 114–140) (Bill Homeier Laps 141–165)	Nichels-Offenhauser	138.78	11	165	Retirement		
25	23	74	(United States) Andy Linden (Bob Scott Laps 87–138)	Schroeder-Offenhauser	137.82	27	165	Suspension		
26	30	99	(United States) Jerry Hoyt	Kurtis Kraft-Offenhauser	137.82	28	130	Engine		
27	2	19	(United States) Jimmy Daywalt	Kurtis Kraft-Offenhauser	139.78	4	111	Accident		
28	28	38	(United States) Jim Rathmann (Pat Flaherty Laps 96–110)	Kurtis Kraft-Offenhauser	138.22	20	110	Accident		
29	21	10	(United States) Tony Bettenhausen	Kurtis Kraft-Offenhauser	138.27	18	105	Wheel Bearing		
30	29	65	(United States) Spider Webb (Danny Kladis Laps 55–104)	Bromme-Offenhauser	137.97	26	104	Fuel pump		
31	26	33	(United States) Len Duncan R (George Fonder Laps 44–101)	Schroeder-Offenhauser	139.21	9	101	Brakes		
32	15	15	(United States) Johnnie Parsons W	Kurtis Kraft-Offenhauser	139.57	7	79	Engine		
33	18	51	(United States) Bill Homeier R	Kurtis Kraft-Offenhauser	138.00	24	74	Accident		

Note: Relief drivers in parentheses

W Former Indianapolis 500 winner

R Indianapolis 500 Rookie

All entrants utilized Firestone tires.

^1 – Includes 1 point for fastest lead lap

=== Race statistics ===
Lap Leaders
Laps	Leader
1–44	Jack McGrath
45–50	Jimmy Daywalt
51–54	Art Cross
55	Jimmy Daywalt
56–59	Art Cross
60	Jimmy Daywalt
61	Bill Vukovich
62	Sam Hanks
63–88	Jimmy Bryan
89–91	Jack McGrath
92–129	Bill Vukovich
130–149	Jimmy Bryan
150–200	Bill Vukovich

Total laps led
Driver	Laps
Bill Vukovich	90
Jack McGrath	47
Jimmy Bryan	46
Art Cross	8
Jimmy Daywalt	8
Sam Hanks	1

Yellow Lights: 21 minutes, 16 seconds
Laps*	Reason
55	Troy Ruttman spin in turn 3 (1:01)
111–115	Jimmy Daywalt, Pat Flaherty crash in turn 4 (12:25)
183–190	Pat O'Connor spin in turn 2; Rain & wind (6:37)
197	Jim Rathmann spin on mainstretch (1:13)
* – Approximate lap counts

== Additional stats ==
- Pole position: Jack McGrath – 4:15.26 (4 laps)
- Pole Speed: 141.033 mph (average for 4 laps)
- Fastest Lead Lap: Jack McGrath – 1:04.04 (140.540 mph)
- Relief drivers:
  - Troy Ruttman (130 laps) & Duane Carter (70) shared car no 34. Shared points for 4th position.
  - Paul Russo (150) & Jerry Hoyt (50) shared car no 5.
  - Art Cross (120), Jimmie Davies (30), Johnnie Parsons (22), Andy Linden (17) & Sam Hanks (11) shared car no 45.
  - Chuck Stevenson (82), Walt Faulkner (117) shared car no 98.
  - Duane Carter (76), Jimmy Jackson (57), Tony Bettenhausen (34) & Marshall Teague (29) shared car no 16.
  - Ed Elisian (148) & Bob Scott (45) shared car no 27.
  - Frank Armi (179) & George Fonder (14) shared car no 71.
  - Sam Hanks (112), Jimmie Davies (36) & Jim Rathmann (43) shared car no 1.
  - Rodger Ward (105) & Eddie Johnson (67) shared car no 12.
  - Gene Hartley (151) & Marshall Teague (17) shared car no 31.
  - Andy Linden (113) & Bob Scott (52) shared car no 74.
  - Johnny Thomson (113), Andy Linden (27) & Jimmy Daywalt (25) shared car no 43.
  - Jim Rathmann (95) & Pat Flaherty (15) shared car no 38.
  - Spider Webb (54) & Danny Kladis (50) shared car no 65.
  - Len Duncan (43) & George Fonder (58) shared car no 33.
- It was the first Indy 500 where the entire field on race day had Offenhauser engines.

== Broadcasting ==
=== Radio ===
The race was carried live flag-to-flag on the Indianapolis Motor Speedway Radio Network. It was the second time the race was carried in its entirety. The broadcast was anchored by Sid Collins, his third as chief announcer, and seventh year overall with the crew. Charlie Brockman served as booth analyst and statistician, and also reported from victory lane. For the first time ever, a female reporter was part of the radio crew. Paula Carr of WIRE served as a roving reporter, interviewing celebrities and other special guests.

Of note, the network expanded its coverage to include four qualifying wrap-up shows during time trials weekends.

The network expanded to include four qualifying wrap-up shows, and the number of affiliate stations increased to 210. All five major radio stations in Indianapolis carried the broadcast. The 1954 broadcast is notable in that it featured for the first time the famous phrase "Stay tuned for the Greatest Spectacle in Racing." Due to the increased number of affiliates at the time, the network needed a scripted "out-cue" to alert producers when to manually insert local commercials. A young WIBC marketing staff member named Alice Greene (née Bunger) is credited with inventing the phrase, and chief announcer Sid Collins coined it on-air. It has been used ever since, with all of the chief announcers proudly reciting it during their respective tenures.

Indianapolis Motor Speedway Radio Network
Booth Announcers	Turn Reporters	Pit/garage reporters
Chief Announcer: Sid Collins; Color: Charlie Brockman	South Turns: Bill Frosch; Backstretch: Jack Shapiro; North Turns: Easy Gwynn	Luke Walton (north pits); Greg Smith (south pits); Dick Lingle; Paula Carr

== World Drivers' Championship ==
1954 Indianapolis 500
Race 2 of 9 in the 1954 Formula One season
← Previous race	Next race →

Race details
- Date: May 31, 1954
- Location: Indianapolis Motor Speedway; Speedway, Indiana
- Course: Permanent racing facility
- Course length: 4.023 km (2.500 miles)
- Distance: 200 laps, 804.672 km (500.000 miles)

=== Background ===
The Indianapolis 500 was included in the FIA World Championship of Drivers from 1950 through 1960. The race was sanctioned by AAA through 1955, and then by USAC beginning in 1956. At the time the new world championship was announced and first organized by the CSI, the United States did not yet have a Grand Prix. Indianapolis Motor Speedway vice president and general manager Theodore E. "Pop" Meyers lobbied that the Indianapolis 500 be selected as the race to represent the country and to pay points towards the world championship.

Drivers competing at the Indianapolis 500 in 1950 through 1960 were credited with participation in and earned points towards the World Championship of Drivers. However, the machines competing at Indianapolis were not necessarily run to Formula One specifications and regulations. The drivers also earned separate points (on a different scale) towards the respective AAA or USAC national championships. No points, however, were awarded by the FIA towards the World Constructors Championship.

=== Summary ===
The 1954 Indianapolis 500 was round 2 of 9 on the 1954 World Championship. The event, however, failed to attract interest from any of the regular competitors on the Grand Prix circuit. Race winner Bill Vukovich earned 8 points towards the World Championship. Despite not competing in any of the other World Championship events, he finished sixth in the final season standings.

==== World Drivers' Championship standings after the race ====
	Pos	Driver	Points
	1	(Argentina) Juan Manuel Fangio	8
16	2	(United States) Bill Vukovich	8
1	3	(Italy) Nino Farina	6
14	4	(United States) Jimmy Bryan	6
2	5	(Argentina) José Froilán González	5

- Note: Only the top five positions are included.

==== AAA Championship car standings after the race ====
Pos	Driver	Points
1	(United States) Bill Vukovich	1,000
2	(United States) Jimmy Bryan	800
3	(United States) Jack McGrath	700
4	(United States) Mike Nazaruk	500
5	(United States) Fred Agabashian	400

- Note: Only the top five positions are included.

Previous race: 1954 Argentine Grand Prix	FIA Formula One World Championship; 1954 season	Next race: 1954 Belgian Grand Prix
Previous race: 1953 Indianapolis 500; Bill Vukovich	1954 Indianapolis 500; Bill Vukovich	Next race: 1955 Indianapolis 500; Bob Sweikert
Preceded by 128.922 mph (1952 Indianapolis 500)	Record for the Indianapolis 500 fastest average speed 130.840 mph	Succeeded by 135.601 mph (1957 Indianapolis 500)
