= Jimmy Daywalt =

- Born: James Edward Daywalt; August 28, 1924; Wabash, Indiana, U.S.
- Died: April 4, 1966 (aged 41); Indianapolis, Indiana, U.S.
- Resting place: Crown Hill Cemetery and Arboretum, Section Community Mausoleum, Lot BB-D-20; 39.8274766°N 86.1730061°W

Formula One World Championship career
- Nationality: (United States) American
- Active years: 1951–1960
- Team(s): Meyer, Kurtis Kraft
- Entries: 10 (6 starts)
- Championships: 0
- Wins: 0
- Podiums: 0
- Career points: 0
- Pole positions: 0
- Fastest laps: 0
- First entry: 1951 Indianapolis 500
- Last entry: 1960 Indianapolis 500

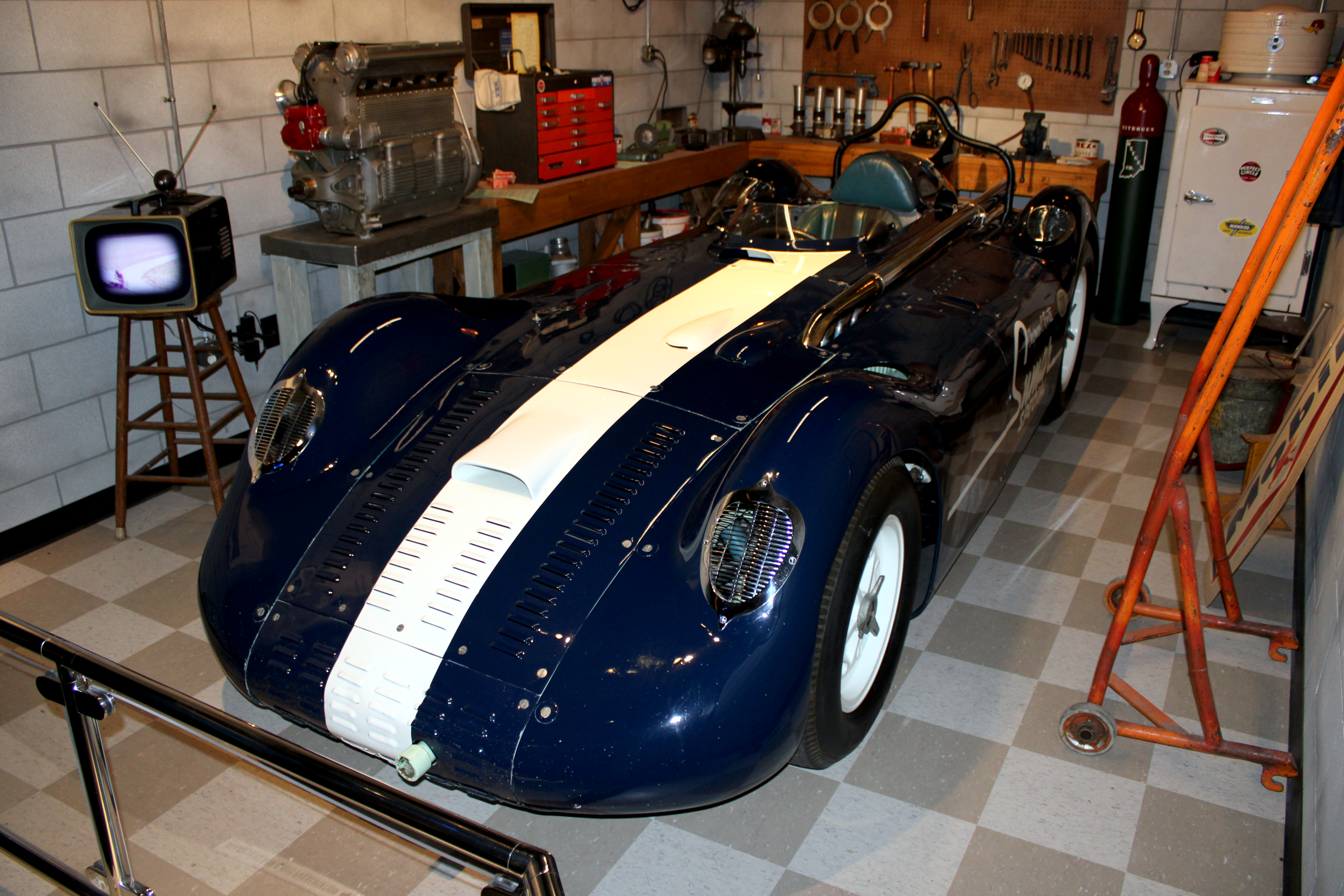
Jimmy Daywalt's 1955 Sumar Special on display at the Indianapolis Motor Speedway Museum

James Edward Daywalt (August 28, 1924 – April 4, 1966) was an American racecar driver.

Born in Wabash, Indiana, Daywalt served in the Army Air Corps during the Second World War, acting as a tail gunner in B-24s of the 392nd Bomb Group. After the war, he drove in the AAA and USAC Championship Car series, racing in the 1950, 1953–1957, 1959, and 1961–1962 seasons with 20 starts. He finished in the top-ten three times. His best finish was in the 1953 Indianapolis 500, where he finished sixth and was named Rookie of the Year.

Daywalt died of cancer in Indianapolis, Indiana, aged 41. He is interred at Crown Hill Cemetery in Indianapolis.

== Indy 500 results ==
Year	Car	Start	Qual	Rank	Finish	Laps	Led	Retired
1953	48	21	135.747	23	6	200	0	Running
1954	19	2	139.789	3	27	111	8	Crash T4
1955	48	17	139.416	18	9	200	0	Running
1956	48	16	140.977	28	24	134	0	Crash T2
1957	57	29	140.203	27	28	53	0	Crash T3
1959	66	13	144.683	3	14	200	0	Running
1961	55	23	144.219	30	31	27	0	Brake Line
1962	79	33	146.318	31	22	74	0	Transmission
Totals						999	8	

Starts	8
Poles	0
Front Row	1
Wins	0
Top 5	0
Top 10	2
Retired	5

== Complete Formula One World Championship results ==
(key)

Year	Entrant	Chassis	Engine	1	2	3	4	5	6	7	8	9	10	11	WDC	Points
1951	Iddings	Meyer	Novi V8	SUI	500; DNQ	BEL	FRA	GBR	GER	ITA	ESP				NC	0
1952	Merkler Machine Works	Kurtis Kraft	Novi V8	SUI	500; DNQ	BEL	FRA	GBR	GER	NED	ITA				NC	0
1953	Sumar / Chapman Root	Kurtis Kraft	Offenhauser L4	ARG	500; 6	NED	BEL	FRA	GBR	GER	SUI	ITA			NC	0
1954	Sumar / Chapman Root	Kurtis Kraft	Offenhauser L4	ARG	500; 27	BEL	FRA	GBR	GER	SUI	ITA	ESP			NC	0
1955	Sumar / Chapman Root	Kurtis Kraft	Offenhauser L4	ARG	MON	500; 9	BEL	NED	GBR	ITA					NC	0
1956	Sumar / Chapman Root	Kurtis Kraft	Offenhauser L4	ARG	MON	500; 24	BEL	FRA	GBR	GER	ITA				NC	0
1957	Helse / H.H. Johnson	Kurtis Kraft	Offenhauser L4	ARG	MON	500; 28	FRA	GBR	GER	PES	ITA				NC	0
1958	Federal Engineering	Kurtis Kraft	Offenhauser L4	ARG	MON	NED	500; DNQ	BEL	FRA	GBR	GER	POR	ITA	MOR	NC	0
1959	Federal Engineering	Kurtis Kraft	Offenhauser L4	MON	500; 14	NED	FRA	GBR	GER	POR	ITA	USA			NC	0
1960	Bryant Heating	Kurtis Kraft	Offenhauser L4	ARG	MON	500; DNQ	NED	BEL	FRA	GBR	POR	ITA	USA		NC	0

Sporting positions
Preceded by Art Cross	Indianapolis 500; Rookie of the Year; 1953	Succeeded by Larry Crockett
