= Larry Crockett =

American racing driver (1926–1955)

- Born: Larret Julian Crockett; October 23, 1926 Cambridge City, Indiana, U.S.
- Died: March 20, 1955 (aged 28) Bristol, Pennsylvania, U.S.

Champ Car career
- 10 races run over 1 year
- Years active: 1954
- Best finish: 11th – 1954
- First race: 1954 Indianapolis 500 (Indianapolis)
- Last race: 1954 Silver State Century (Las Vegas)
Wins	Podiums	Poles
0	0	1

Formula One World Championship career
- Active years: 1954
- Team: Kurtis Kraft
- Entries: 1
- Championships: 0
- Wins: 0
- Podiums: 0
- Career points: 0
- Pole positions: 0
- Fastest laps: 0
- First entry: 1954 Indianapolis 500

Larret Julian "Crash" Crockett (October 23, 1926 in Cambridge City, Indiana – March 20, 1955 in Langhorne, Pennsylvania) was an American racecar driver. Crockett made ten Championship Car starts all in the 1954 season with a best finish of 4th in the Pikes Peak International Hillclimb which counted for National Championship points at the time and finished in 11th in the 1954 points championship. Nicknamed "Crash" because of frequent racing mishaps, Crockett qualified for his first Indianapolis 500 in 1954. He finished ninth and earned Rookie-of-the-Year honors. He was killed in a racing accident at Langhorne Speedway the following spring.

== Indy 500 results ==
Year	Car	Start	Qual	Rank	Finish	Laps	Led	Retired
1954	28	25	139.557	7	9	200	0	Running
Totals						200	0	

Starts	1
Poles	0
Front Row	0
Wins	0
Top 5	0
Top 10	1
Retired	0

== Complete Formula One World Championship results ==
(key)

Year	Entrant	Chassis	Engine	1	2	3	4	5	6	7	8	9	WDC	Points
1954	Federal Engineering	Kurtis Kraft 3000	Offenhauser L4	ARG	500; 9	BEL	FRA	GBR	GER	SUI	ITA	ESP	NC	0

Sporting positions
Preceded by Jimmy Daywalt	Indianapolis 500; Rookie of the Year; 1954	Succeeded by Al Herman
