= Johnny McDowell =

American racing driver (1915–1952)

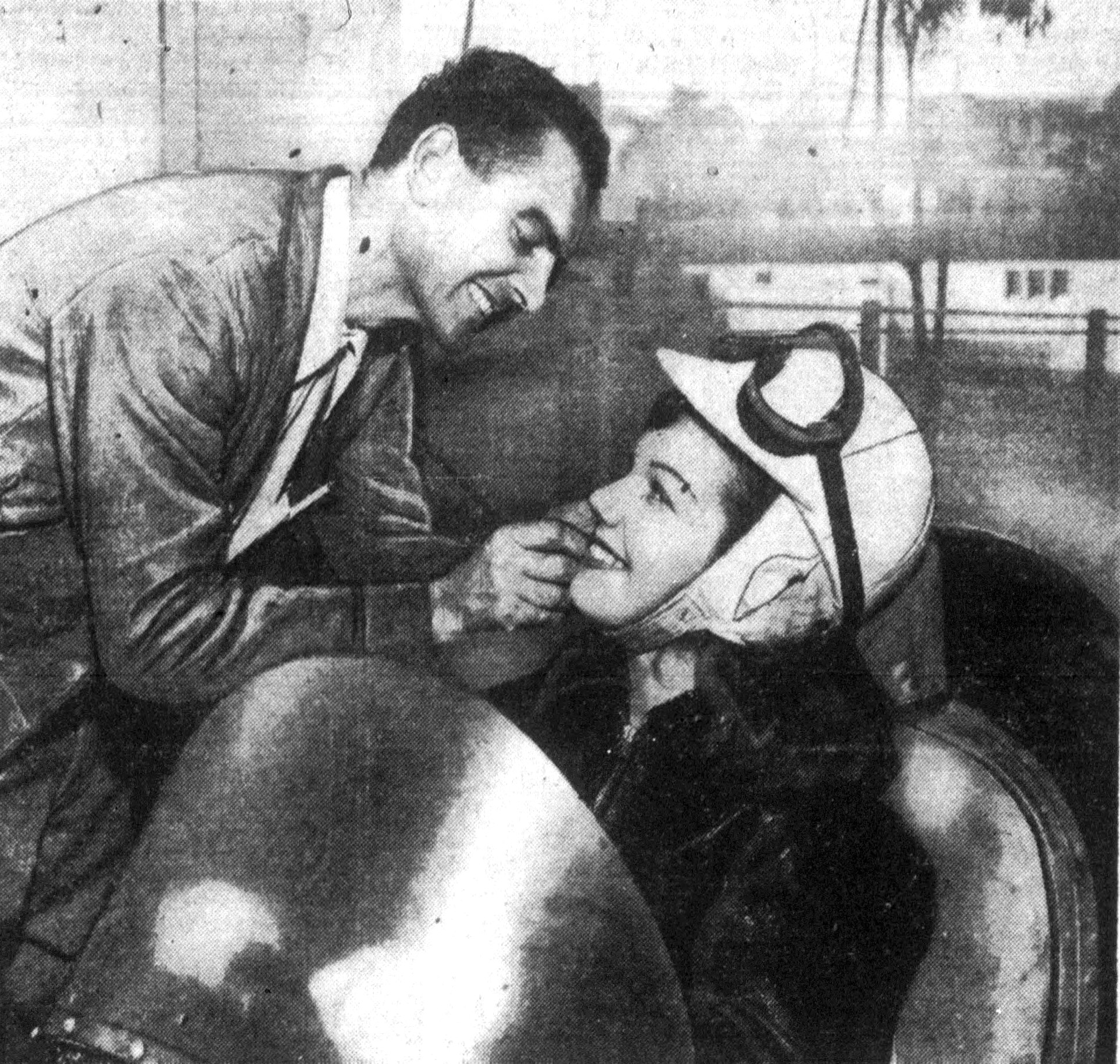
- McDowell (left) in 1947
- Born: John Maxwell McDowell; January 29, 1915 Delavan, Illinois, U.S.
- Died: June 8, 1952 (aged 37) West Allis, Wisconsin, U.S.

Champ Car career
- 18 races run over 5 years
- Years active: 1948–1952
- Best finish: 27th – 1951
- First race: 1949 Arlington 100 (Arlington)
- Last race: 1952 Indianapolis 500 (Indianapolis)
Wins	Podiums	Poles
0	0	3

Formula One World Championship career
- Active years: 1950–1952
- Team(s): Kurtis Kraft, Maserati
- Entries: 3
- Championships: 0
- Wins: 0
- Podiums: 0
- Career points: 0
- Pole positions: 0
- Fastest laps: 0
- First entry: 1950 Indianapolis 500
- Last entry: 1952 Indianapolis 500

John Maxwell McDowell (January 29, 1915 – June 8, 1952) was an American racecar driver from Delavan, Illinois. He died in a qualifying crash at the Milwaukee Mile the week after the 1952 Indy 500.

== Racing career ==
McDowell was raised in Pasadena, California. He began racing cars at Legion Ascot Speedway in 1934. He later moved on to the independent circuits in the Northwestern United States. He then moved to the CSRA circuit based in Ohio. He had his first experience at the Indianapolis 500 as a riding mechanic for Frank Wearne in 1937. McDowell raced against top midget car drivers at Gilmore Stadium in 1939. He held the points lead until September, and he finished second in the points behind Bob Swanson. He won thirteen features at the track, and is ninth on the track's all-time win list. McDowell finished second in the AAA West Coast midget car points standings in 1947. He also won the 1947 Turkey Night Grand Prix.

McDowell moved to the Midwestern United States in 1948. He won at least eight AAA midget car features, and won the 1948 Soldier Field title.

McDowell competed in the 1949 to 1952 Indianapolis 500 races. He was killed at the Champ Car race at the Milwaukee Mile on June 8, 1952, at age 37.

== Career awards ==
- McDowell was inducted in the National Midget Auto Racing Hall of Fame in 2003.

== Indianapolis 500 results ==
Year	Car	Start	Qual	Rank	Finish	Laps	Led	Retired
1949	32	28	126.139	30	18	142	0	Magneto
1950	62	33	129.692	28	18	128	0	Flagged
1951	12	26	132.475	24	32	15	0	Gas tank
1952	31	33	133.939	32	21	182	0	Flagged
Totals						467	0	

Starts	4
Poles	0
Front Row	0
Wins	0
Top 5	0
Top 10	0
Retired	2

== World Championship career summary ==
The Indianapolis 500 was part of the FIA World Championship from 1950 through 1960. Drivers competing at Indy during those years were credited with World Championship points and participation. McDowell participated in three World Championship races but scored no World Championship points.
