= Jim Rigsby =

American racing driver (1923–1952)

- Born: James William Rigsby; June 6, 1923 Spadra, Arkansas, U.S.
- Died: August 31, 1952 (aged 29) Dayton, Ohio, U.S.

Champ Car career
- 14 races run over 3 years
- Years active: 1950–1952
- Best finish: 16th – 1952
- First race: 1951 Springfield 100 (Springfield)
- Last race: 1952 Detroit 100 (Detroit)
Wins	Podiums	Poles
0	0	1

Formula One World Championship career
- Active years: 1950, 1952
- Team(s): Maserati, Watson
- Entries: 2 (1 start)
- Championships: 0
- Wins: 0
- Podiums: 0
- Career points: 0
- Pole positions: 0
- Fastest laps: 0
- First entry: 1950 Indianapolis 500
- Last entry: 1952 Indianapolis 500

James William Rigsby (June 6, 1923 – August 31, 1952) was an American racecar driver from Spadra, Arkansas. He was killed in a crash during a sprint car race at Dayton, Ohio.

== Indy 500 results ==
Year	Car	Start	Qual	Rank	Finish	Laps	Led	Retired
1952	29	26	133.904	33	12	200	0	Running
Totals						200	0	

Starts	1
Poles	0
Front Row	0
Wins	0
Top 5	0
Top 10	0
Retired	0

== World Championship career summary ==
The Indianapolis 500 was part of the FIA World Championship from 1950 through 1960. Drivers competing at Indy during those years were credited with World Championship points and participation. Rigsby participated in one World Championship race but scored no World Championship points.
