= Carl Scarborough =

American racecar driver (1914–1953)

- Born: July 3, 1914; Benton, Illinois, U.S.
- Died: May 30, 1953 (aged 38); Speedway, Indiana, U.S.

Formula One World Championship career
- Nationality: (United States) American
- Active years: 1951, 1953
- Team: Kurtis Kraft
- Entries: 2
- Championships: 0
- Wins: 0
- Podiums: 0
- Career points: 0
- Pole positions: 0
- Fastest laps: 0
- First entry: 1951 Indianapolis 500
- Last entry: 1953 Indianapolis 500

Carl Scarborough (July 3, 1914 – May 30, 1953) was an American racecar driver. He died from heat exhaustion during the 1953 Indianapolis 500, a race in which several drivers experienced heat-related illness. The race was Scarborough's second entry in the Indianapolis 500. He had also been the national champion in both big car and midget car racing. After he died, race officials announced plans to inspect Indy 500 vehicles for suitable ventilation.

== Early life and career ==
Scarborough was born in Benton, Illinois on July 3, 1914. Before his entries in the Indianapolis 500, he had participated in "outlaw" racing in Michigan, Indiana and Ohio. Early in his racing career, Scarborough sat out for two years after sustaining injuries as the passenger in a car crash. In 1946, Scarborough was the national midget car racing champion. He also won the national big car title that year, becoming the first driver named the Central States Racing Association national champion in both categories.

While attempting to qualify for the 1951 Indianapolis 500, he ran the second fastest qualifying lap that had ever been recorded at the Indianapolis Motor Speedway. He finished 18th in that race; within four years, eleven of the 35 men in the 1951 race's starting lineup had died, mostly in race-related incidents.

== Death and legacy ==
Scarborough started the 1953 Indianapolis 500 on the seventh row. He qualified for the race with an average speed of 135.936 miles per hour (218.768 km/h). During Scarborough's first pit stop, he felt sick from the heat and fumes at the race. After a fuel spill during the pit stop, a minor fire broke out involving the side of Scarborough's car. Scarborough climbed over the pit wall and collapsed onto a chair. Bob Scott replaced Scarborough on the track. Scott's own car had experienced mechanical difficulties early in the race. He finished the race for Scarborough in twelfth place.

Scarborough was taken to the speedway's hospital, where he died. His temperature was recorded as 104 °F (40 °C) on admission to the hospital. Physicians there unsuccessfully performed open-heart massage before Scarborough was pronounced dead. The temperature was 91 °F (33 °C) in Indianapolis that day; nine drivers were treated for heat-related illness. Driver Pat Flaherty suffered minor injuries when he fainted and crashed into a wall later in the race. The track temperature reached 130 °F (54 °C).

Scarborough was the second person to die at that year's event. Chet Miller died in a crash during a practice run before the official start of the race.

At the time of his death, Scarborough lived in Clarkston, Michigan with his wife and three children. He had been racing in some capacity for 18 years. After his death, Indy 500 officials instituted a new rule that cars would be inspected to ensure adequate ventilation before the following year's race. Scarborough was elected to the Michigan Motor Sports Hall of Fame in 1985.

== Indy 500 results ==
Year	Car	Start	Qual	Rank	Finish	Laps	Led	Retired
1951	73	15	135.614	4	18	100	0	Axle
1953	73	19	135.936	21	12	190	0	Flagged
Totals						290	0	

Starts	2
Poles	0
Front Row	0
Wins	0
Top 5	0
Top 10	0
Retired	1

== See also ==
- List of sportspeople who died during their careers
