= Ernie McCoy (racing driver) =

American racing driver

Ernest Musser
- Born: February 19, 1921
- Died: February 4, 2001 (aged 79)

Formula One World Championship career
- Nationality: (United States) American
- Active years: 1953–1955
- Team(s): Stevens, Kurtis Kraft, Templeton
- Entries: 3 (2 starts)
- Championships: 0
- Wins: 0
- Podiums: 0
- Career points: 0
- Pole positions: 0
- Fastest laps: 0
- First entry: 1953 Indianapolis 500
- Last entry: 1955 Indianapolis 500

Ernest "Ernie McCoy" Musser (February 19, 1921 in Reading, Pennsylvania – February 4, 2001) was an American racecar driver.

McCoy's real name was Ernest Musser.

== Indianapolis 500 results ==
Year	Car	Start	Qual	Rank	Finish	Laps	Led	Retired
1953	12	20	135.926	22	8	200	0	Running
1954	32	20	138.419	16	16	194	0	Flagged
Totals						394	0	

Starts	2
Poles	0
Front Row	0
Wins	0
Top 5	0
Top 10	1
Retired	0

== World Championship career summary ==
The Indianapolis 500 was part of the FIA World Championship from 1950 through 1960. Drivers competing at Indy during those years were credited with World Championship points and participation. McCoy participated in two World Championship races but scored no World Championship points.
