= Harry Stockman (racing driver) =

American racing driver

Harry Stockman (January 13, 1919 – March 23, 1994) was an American racecar driver who raced midget cars. He was born in Yucaipa, California.

Stockman was often based in Arizona and won the CRA Sprint Car race at the South Mountain Speedway, Phoenix, AZ in 1952. Stockman drove for Vic Edelbrock's midget car racing team, driving for the 1951 and 1952 seasons. He was also the CRA champion for the year of 1952. As a side activity, Stockman played hockey with the San Bernardino Shamrocks of the California Hockey League in the 1951–52 season.

Stockman died in 1994 after a period of ill-health. His son Gary is involved in sports cars as well, and is currently the race director at Orange Show Speedway in San Bernardino, CA, where his father frequently raced and tested Edelbrock's cars.
