= Mike Nazaruk =

American racing driver (1921–1955)

- Born: October 2, 1921 Newark, New Jersey, U.S.
- Died: May 1, 1955 (aged 33) Langhorne, Pennsylvania, U.S.

Champ Car career
- 36 races run over 5 years
- Years active: 1950–1954
- Best finish: 5th – 1951
- First race: 1951 Indianapolis 500 (Indianapolis)
- Last race: 1954 Syracuse 100 (Syracuse)
- First win: 1952 Rex Mays Classic (Milwaukee)
Wins	Podiums	Poles
1	6	3

Formula One World Championship career
- Active years: 1951–1954
- Team(s): Turner, Kurtis Kraft
- Entries: 4 (3 starts)
- Championships: 0
- Wins: 0
- Podiums: 1
- Career points: 8
- Pole positions: 0
- Fastest laps: 0
- First entry: 1951 Indianapolis 500
- Last entry: 1954 Indianapolis 500

Michael Nazaruk (October 2, 1921 Newark, New Jersey – May 1, 1955 Langhorne, Pennsylvania) was an American racecar driver. He raced midget cars, sprint cars, and IndyCars. He was nicknamed "Iron Mike."

Nazaruk was of Ukrainian descent. Before racing, he worked as a florist's delivery driver and as an aircraft welder.

Nazaruk served as a U.S. Marine in the Battle of Guam and the Guadalcanal campaign in World War II. He promised himself that if he lived through the war he would become a race driver.

== Midget car career ==
Nazaruk raced after he returned home. He won the track championships at Staten Island, New York, and Rhinebeck, New York in 1947. He scored over twenty feature wins at Middletown, New York en route to winning the 1948 track championship.

Nazaruk was the 1949 American Racing Drivers Club (ARDC) midget car champion. The series tours the East Coast of the United States.

Nazaruk joined the AAA in 1950. He won 14 national midget tour events, including the 1950 Night Before the 500, and the first midget car event at Terre Haute Action Track in 1953. He finished fifth in the 1954 National Midget car points.

== Championship car career ==
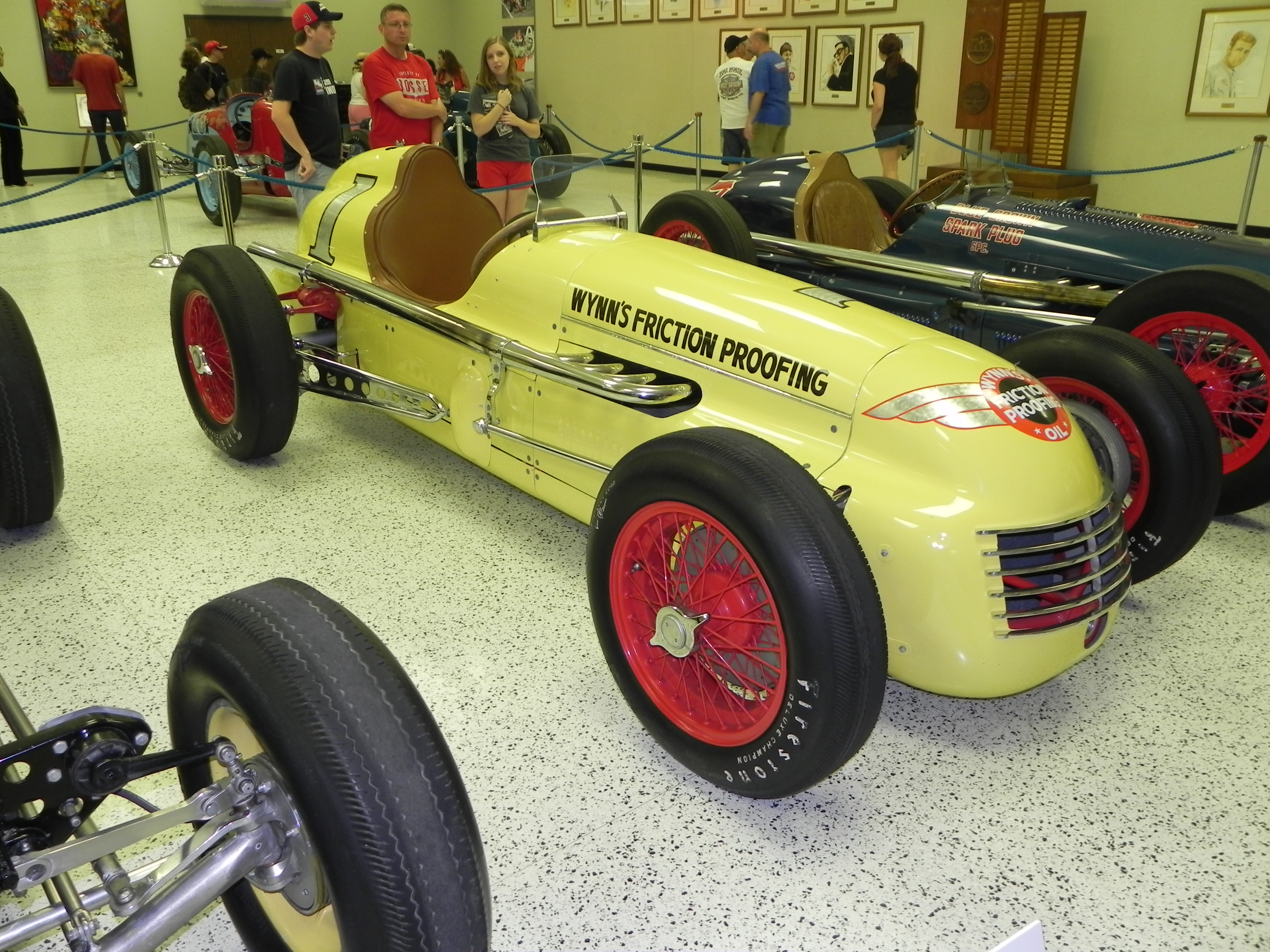
The car Nazaruk drove to a second-place finish in the 1951 Indianapolis 500 - later repainted to look as it did when Johnnie Parsons drove the vehicle to victory in the 1950 event

Nazaruk finished second in his first Indianapolis 500 in 1951. He competed in two more Indianapolis 500, including a fifth-place finish in 1954.

Nazaruk was killed in a sprint car race at Langhorne Speedway on May 1, 1955.

== Career awards ==
- He was inducted in the National Sprint Car Hall of Fame in 1996.
- He was inducted in the National Midget Auto Racing Hall of Fame in 2003.

== Complete AAA Championship Car results ==
Year	1	2	3	4	5	6	7	8	9	10	11	12	13	14	15	Pos	Points
1950	INDY	MIL	LAN; DNQ	SPR	MIL	PIK	SYR	DET	SPR	SAC	PHX	BAY	DAR			-	0
1951	INDY; 2	MIL; 8	LAN; 9	DAR; 8	SPR	MIL; 16	DUQ	DUQ	PIK	SYR; 18	DET; 3	DNC; 15	SJS; 16	PHX; 18	BAY; 15	5th	1,143
1952	INDY; DNQ	MIL; 1	RAL; 19	SPR; 18	MIL; 16	DET; 17	DUQ; DNQ	PIK	SYR; 2	DNC; 12	SJS; 2	PHX; 18				13th	530
1953	INDY; 21	MIL; 11	SPR	DET; 6	SPR; DNQ	MIL; 16	DUQ; 13	PIK	SYR; 2	ISF; 15	SAC; 14	PHX				24th	205
1954	INDY; 5	MIL; 15	LAN; 13	DAR; 25	SPR; 9	MIL; 4	DUQ; 10	PIK	SYR; 17	ISF; DNQ	SAC	PHX	LVG			9th	810

== Indianapolis 500 results ==
Year	Car	Start	Qual	Rank	Finish	Laps	Led	Retired
1951	83	7	132.183	27	2	200	0	Running
1953	83	23	135.706	26	21	146	0	Stalled
1954	73	14	139.589	5	5	200	0	Running
Totals						546	0	

Starts	3
Poles	0
Front Row	0
Wins	0
Top 5	2
Top 10	2
Retired	1

== World Championship career summary ==
The Indianapolis 500 was part of the Formula One World Championship of Drivers from 1950 through 1960. Drivers competing at Indy during those years were credited with World Championship points and participation. Nazaruk participated in three World Championship races. He finished second once (formally "on the podium") and accumulated a total of eight World Championship points.

Records
Preceded by Cecil Green; 30 years, 242 days (1950 Indianapolis 500)	Youngest driver to score points in Formula One; 29 years, 239 days (1951 Indianapolis 500)	Succeeded by Manny Ayulo; 29 years, 221 days (1951 Indianapolis 500)
