= Bob Scott (racing driver) =

American racecar driver (1928–1954)

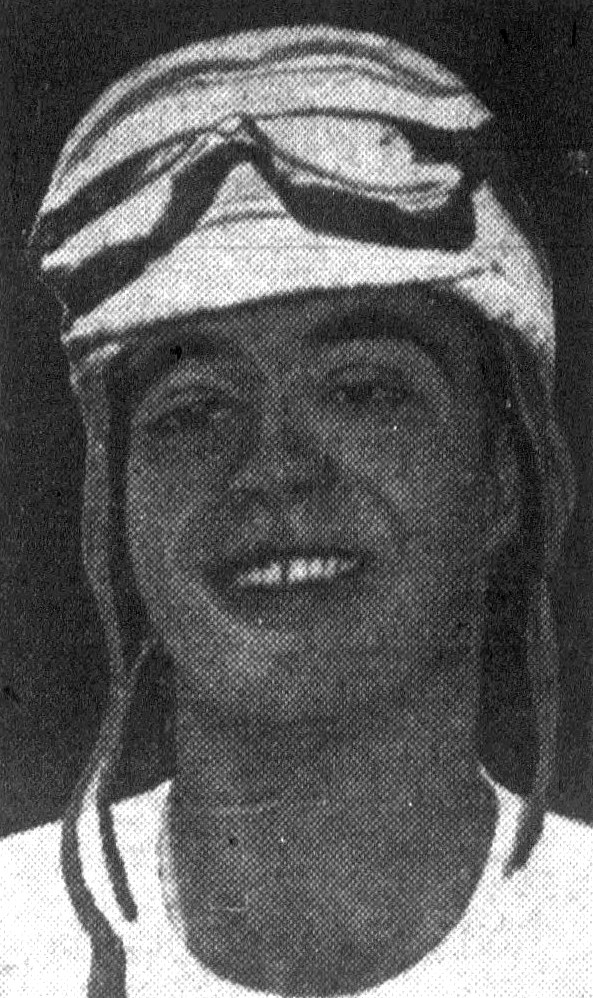
- Scott, circa 1954
- Born: October 4, 1928; Watsonville, California, U.S.
- Died: July 5, 1954 (aged 25); Darlington, South Carolina, U.S.

Formula One World Championship career
- Nationality: (United States) American
- Active years: 1952–1954
- Team(s): Kurtis Kraft, Bromme, Schroeder, Stevens
- Entries: 3
- Championships: 0
- Wins: 0
- Podiums: 0
- Career points: 0
- Pole positions: 0
- Fastest laps: 0
- First entry: 1952 Indianapolis 500
- Last entry: 1954 Indianapolis 500

Robert Franklin Scott (October 4, 1928 in Watsonville, California – July 5, 1954 in Darlington, South Carolina) was an American racecar driver. Scott died in a crash during a Champ Car race at Darlington Raceway.

== Indy 500 results ==
Year	Car	Start	Qual	Rank	Finish	Laps	Led	Retired
1952	93	25	133.953	31	29	49	0	Drive shaft
1953	29	11	137.431	7	31	14	0	Oil Leak
1954	27*	-	-	-	18	?	?	Running
1954	74**	-	-	-	25	?	?	Suspension
Totals						63	0	

* shared drive with Ed Elisian
** shared drive with Andy Linden

Starts	2
Poles	0
Front Row	0
Wins	0
Top 5	0
Top 10	0
Retired	2

== World Championship career summary ==
The Indianapolis 500 was part of the FIA World Championship from 1950 through 1960. Drivers competing at Indy during those years were credited with World Championship points and participation. Scott participated in three World Championship races but scored no World Championship points.
