= Eagle 70 =

- Category: USAC IndyCar
- Constructor: (United States) AAR
- Designer(s): Tony Southgate

Technical specifications
- Chassis: Aluminum monocoque
- Suspension (front): Double wishbones, coil springs over shock absorbers, anti-roll bar
- Suspension (rear): Lower wishbones, top links, twin trailing arms, coil springs over shock absorbers, anti-roll bar
- Engine: Offenhauser 159 cu in (2.6 L) turbocharged DOHC I4 mid-engined, rear-wheel-drive
- Transmission: Hewland L.G.500 4-speed manual
- Weight: 1,442 lb (654 kg)
- Fuel: Methanol
- Brakes: Girling ventilated discs, 305mm (12 in) (fr/r)
- Tyres: Goodyear

Competition history
- Notable entrants: All American Racers
- Notable drivers: (United States) Dan Gurney
- Debut: 1970 Phoenix 150
Wins	Poles
1	0

The Eagle 70 was an open-wheel race car developed and built by Dan Gurney's All American Racers team, designed to compete in USAC IndyCar racing, starting in the 1970 season.
