= Danny Oakes =

American racing driver (1911–2007)

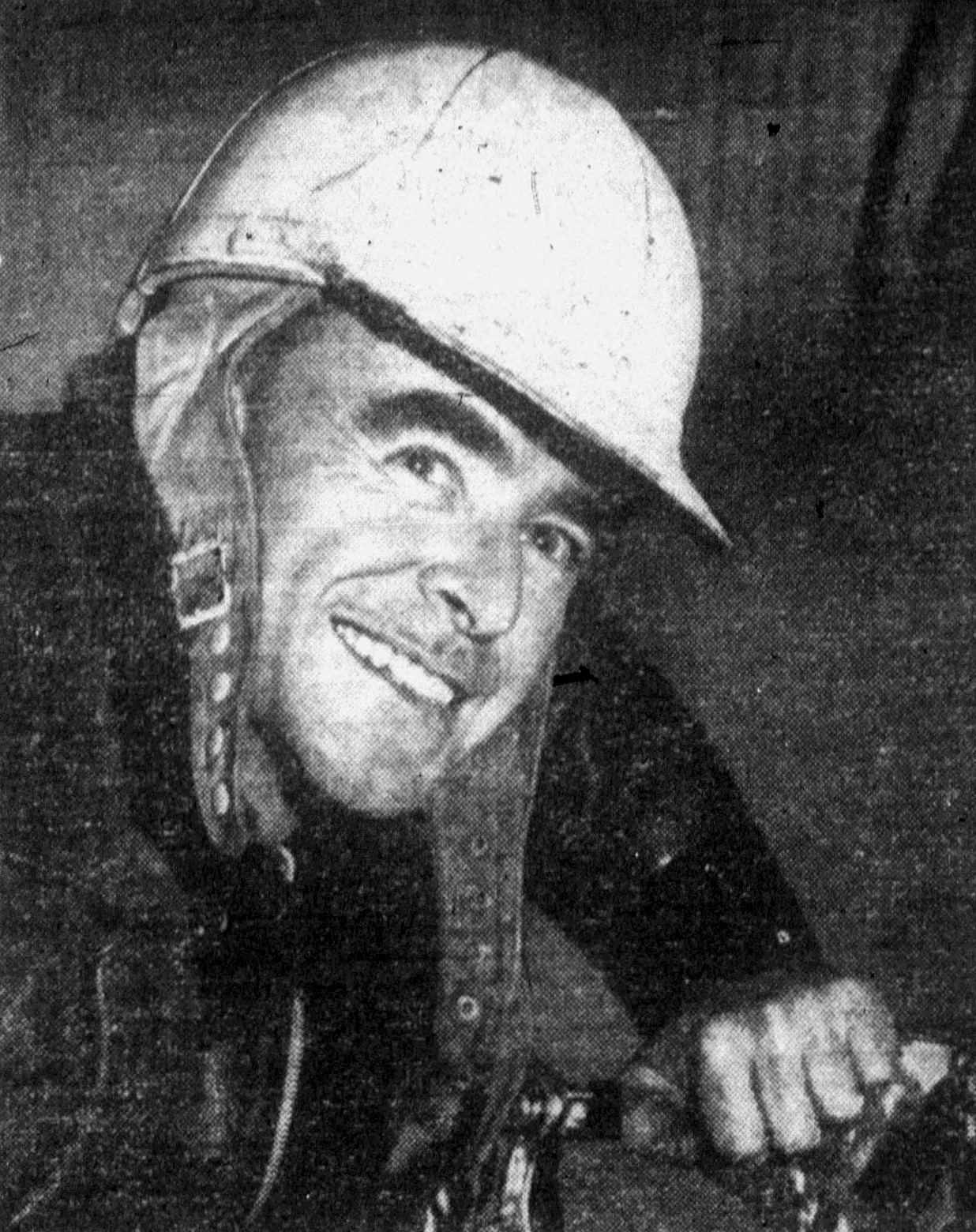
Oakes, circa 1947

Daniel George Oakes (July 18, 1911 – January 13, 2007) was an American midget car hall of fame driver.

== Early life ==
Daniel G. Oakes became interested in racing when he delivered morning and evening newspapers in his hometown of Santa Barbara, California. His favorite day was Monday. He viewed Model T cars powered by Frontenac motors parked outside a downtown Santa Barbara restaurant when the professional racecar drivers from San Francisco came to town. Oakes fantasized about the day he would become a race driver.

Oakes began attending races at Legion Ascot Speedway. He built a black roadster with chrome wheels that he drove to the track. The car led to an opportunity to be a mechanic on a bootlegger's racecar. Oakes drove the car at warmups at area racetracks.

== Driving career ==
Oakes began racing at Legion Ascot Speedway in 1932 at age 21 in the Class C for beginners. Legion Ascot Speedway closed down in 1936, and Oakes switched to midget cars. He won the Pacific Coast championship three times. Oakes was one of the drivers who was unable to race in the prime of his life during the four years of World War II, as all racing halted during the war. Oakes was a flight inspector at Lockheed.

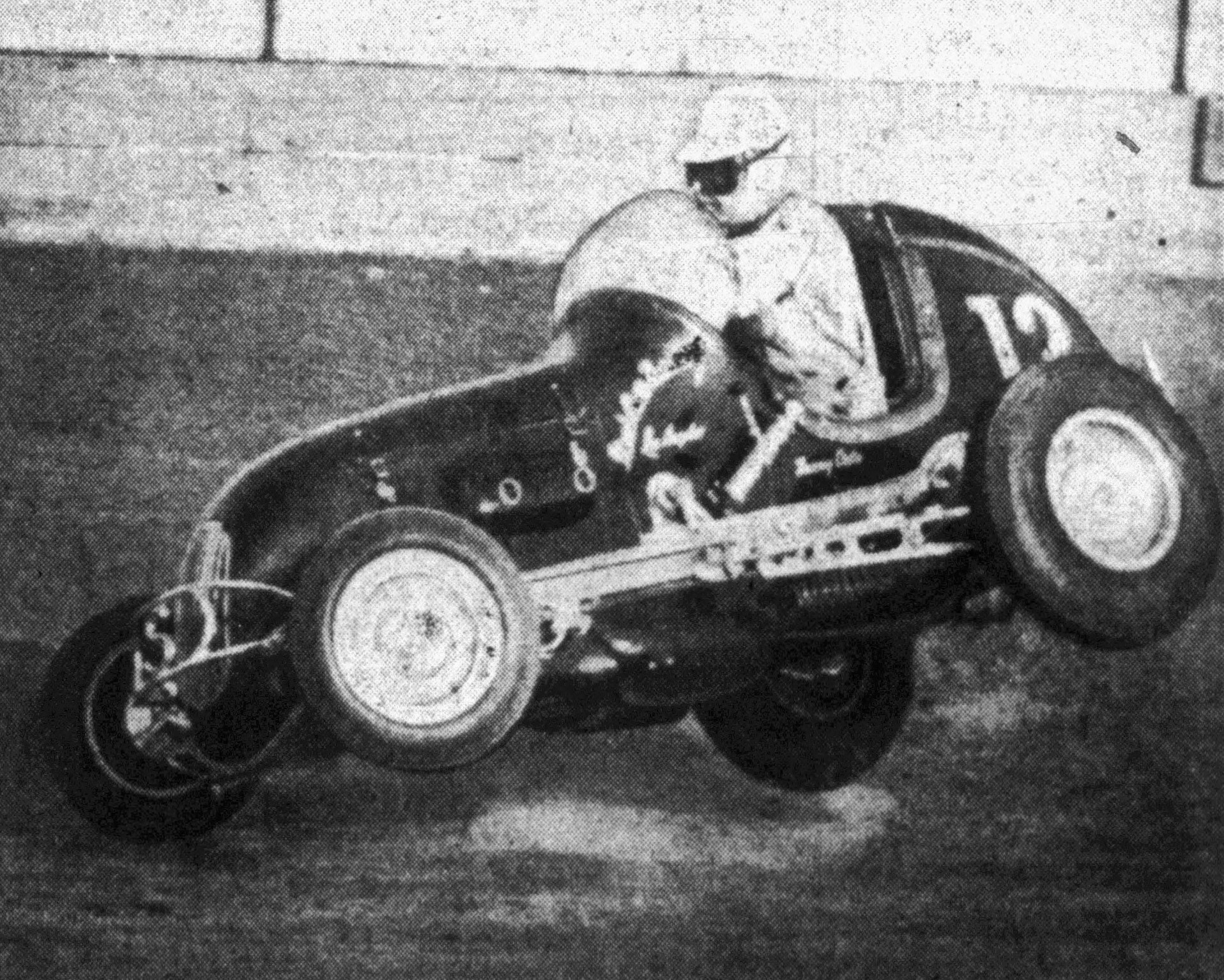
Oakes, circa 1946

Oakes won the first race after the war at Gilmore Stadium, the 1945 Turkey Night Grand Prix. He won the 1947 Pacific AAA midget car championship. He later won the 1959 Pacific Coast USAC championship. Oakes holds the 40-lap record at Gilmore.

Oakes drove for 25 years in the midget cars and Championship cars, but he was unable to qualify for any Indianapolis 500 races as a driver. He attempted from 1952 to 1955. He was bumped from the field in 1954, and he did not complete his attempt in 1952. He stood by as a relief driver for his friend Alberto Ascari, but Ascari's Ferrari was eliminated before his first pit stop.

Oakes continued racing midgets until he was in his mid-60s. He ended his racing career as a throttleman in off-shore boat racing in his 70s.

During his years of driving, Oakes became friends with Tony Hulman, Wilbur Shaw, and other big names in racing during those reconstructive years after WWII. Oakes was infamous with the ladies and often referred to as "Dapper Dan".

== Crew chief ==
Oakes did set up the Jim Hurtubise's car in 1960, which won the pole for the Indianapolis 500 by three miles per hour. Hurtubise won the Indianapolis 500 Rookie of the Year award. Oakes was also crew chief for Johnny White his 1964 Indianapolis 500 Rookie of the Year performance. His final attempt at Indy at qualifying Paul Goldsmith in 1965 ended after mechanical failure.

== Career award ==
- Oakes was inducted in the National Midget Auto Racing Hall of Fame in 1996.

== Death ==
Oakes died in Huntington Beach, California on January 13, 2007, aged 95.
