= Kurtis Sport Car =

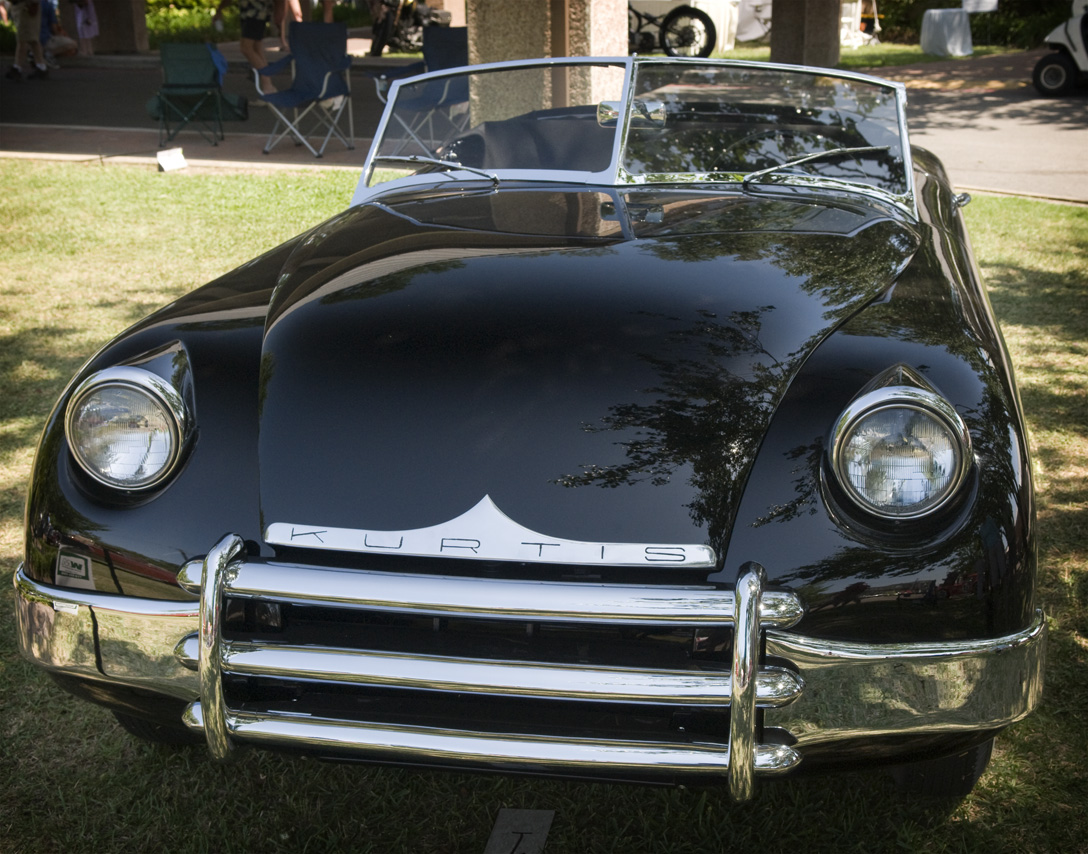

Overview
- Manufacturer: Kurtis Kraft
- Production: c. 1949–1950
- Assembly: Los Angeles, California, United States
- Designer: Frank Kurtis

Body and chassis
- Class: Sports car
- Body style: Hardtop convertible coupé
- Layout: FR
- Platform: 1949 Ford

Powertrain
- Engine: Multiple Ford V8 engines, ranging from 82 hp (61 kW) to 160 hp (120 kW)

Dimensions
- Wheelbase: 2,540 mm (100 in)
- Length: 4,293 mm (169 in)
- Width: 1,727 mm (68 in)
- Height: 1,295 mm (51 in)
- Curb weight: 1,043 kg (2,300 lb)

Chronology
- Successor: Muntz Jet

The Kurtis Sport Car (KSC) is a two-seat, aluminum-body sports car designed by Frank Kurtis and manufactured by Kurtis Kraft in 1949 and 1950. Built with numerous components (including the chassis and V8 engine) from a 1949 Ford, the KSC was built as both a production car and a kit car. It was sold at a base price of $3,495. It could cost up to $5,000 with options, which was approximately $1,000 more than the then-new Jaguar XK120.

After Frank Kurtis realized that the car was not sustainable financially, largely due to production costs, he sold the KSC's manufacturing rights, along with its blueprints, parts, and tooling, to Earl "Madman" Muntz for $200,000 in 1950. By that time, only 18 to 36 KSCs had been produced.

In August 1949, Wally Parks, founder of the National Hot Rod Association (NHRA) and co-founder of Hot Rod magazine, drove a modified KSC to 142.515 mph (229.356 km/h) on the Bonneville Salt Flats. In September 1949, that same KSC was featured on the cover of the first issue of Motor Trend. The KSC also likely inspired Harley Earl's Project Opel at General Motors (GM), which ultimately created the production Chevrolet Corvette. The KSC was additionally described as the first "true American sports car" in the 2017 Pebble Beach Concours d'Elegance program.

== Background ==
In the 1920s, Frank Kurtis began his career in the automotive industry working alongside Harley Earl at Don Lee's Cadillac dealership in Los Angeles. By the late 1930s, he was building oval-track midget cars and championship cars for the Indianapolis 500. During the 1950s, Kurtis's company, Kurtis Kraft, would go on to build cars that would win five Indianapolis 500s. After building a Mercury-powered sports car just before World War II and similarly customizing a 1941 Buick in 1948, both of which generated serious interest and large offers from businessmen, Kraft decided to build what would become the Kurtis Sport Car (KSC). He envisioned it as a new type of sports car with American power, European handling, and modern styling.

== Design ==
The KSC was designed as a two-seat, aluminum-body sports car by Frank Kurtis. A two-door convertible, it had a front-engine, rear-wheel-drive layout. The prototype KSC was designed in 1949, and built on a 1949 Ford chassis. It was powered by a six-cylinder, supercharged Studebaker engine. The only instrument mounted on the prototype's dashboard was a tachometer, although the car also featured a telescoping steering wheel. Low-slung in appearance, the prototype was built with fiberglass body panels, removable plexiglass side windows, and a removable hardtop.

The KSC measures 51 inches (1,300 mm) in height, 169 inches (4,300 mm) in length, and 68 inches (1,700 mm) in width. Its wheelbase is 100 inches (2,500 mm) and it weighs 2,300 pounds (1,000 kg). The KSC features a distinctive and sturdy front bumper and grille. It also has independent front suspension and semi-elliptic rear suspension. The production car was built with the chassis, V8 engine, suspension, and brakes from a 1949 Ford. The choice of engines offered by Kraft ranged from 82 hp (61 kW) to 160 hp (120 kW). The production KSC's body panels were mostly made of aluminum supported by a steel frame, although some of its panels were made from fiberglass or steel.

== Production and sale ==
In May 1949, Kurtis Kraft announced limited production of the KSC, with assembly occurring at its plant in Los Angeles. At the same time, it announced the KSC would also be available as a kit car.

The base price for the KSC in 1949 was $3,495, and with options it could cost up to $5,000. At the high end, it was approximately $1,000 more expensive than the then-new Jaguar XK120.

During 1949, Kurtis had only sold about 15 to 20 KSCs, by which point he realized that the car was not sustainable financially. In 1950, he sold the KSC's manufacturing rights, along with its blueprints, parts, and tooling, to Earl "Madman" Muntz for $200,000. By the time of the sale, only 18 to 36 KSCs had been produced. Production costs were ultimately the demise of the car.

== Performance ==
In a contemporary review, Tom McCahill of Mechanix Illustrated tested a KSC and reported a 0 to 60 mph time of 11.5 seconds and a top speed of 105 mph (169 km/h), faster than all American production cars at the time.

In August 1949, Wally Parks, founder of the National Hot Rod Association (NHRA) and co-founder of Hot Rod magazine, drove a KSC powered by a performance-modified Ford V8 engine to 142.515 mph (229.356 km/h) on the Bonneville Salt Flats.

== Legacy ==
In September 1949, the KSC that was driven by Wally Parks at Bonneville was featured on the cover of the first issue of Motor Trend. Publisher Robert E. "Pete" Petersen, who was partially inspired by Frank Kurtis to start the magazine, may have chosen the KSC for the first cover of Motor Trend in part due to his relationship with Kurtis. That car, the first production KSC and the third built overall (serial number KB003), was purchased by Motor Trend in 2019 and put on display at its headquarters in El Segundo, California. That year, 70 years after reviewing it for its first issue, Motor Trend decided to test KB003, finding that it weighed 2,835 pounds (1,286 kg), had a 0 to 60 mph time of 15.3 seconds, and a quarter-mile time of 20.0 seconds.

After buying the rights to the KSC in 1950, "Madman" Muntz proceeded to create the Muntz Car Company and redevelop the car into what eventually became the Muntz Jet. He lost money on the endeavor and ceased production in 1954.

By 1951, just two years after the KSC appeared on the cover of Motor Trend, Harley Earl had created a secret program at General Motors (GM) known as Project Opel. Its goal was to create a fiberglass-bodied car using production components, similar to what Kraft had attempted with the KSC. First unveiled at Motorama in 1953 as the EX-122, the resulting GM car eventually entered production as the Chevrolet Corvette.

A 1949 KSC won the Motor Trend Classic Award – Editor's Choice at the 2010 Amelia Island Concours d'Elegance, while a different 1949 KSC won Best in Class for Kurtis street vehicles at the 2011 Amelia Island Concours d'Elegance. The 2017 Pebble Beach Concours d'Elegance program described the KSC as the first "true American sports car". At the 2019 Amelia Island Concours d'Elegance auction, a 1950 KSC sold for $263,200.

== Sources ==
- Lyons, Dan (2005). Cars of the Fantastic '50s. Iola, Wisconsin: Krause Publications. pp. 27–29. ISBN 978-087349-926-2.
- Pace, Harold; Brinker, Mark R. (2004). Vintage American Road Racing Cars: 1950-1969. Saint Paul, Minnesota: MBI Publishing Company. pp. 94–95. ISBN 0-7603-1783-6.
- Stone, Matt (2015). Exotic Barn Finds: Lamborghini, Ferrari, Porsche, Aston Martin and More. North Branch, Minnesota: CarTech. pp. 14–17. ISBN 978-1-61325-202-4.
