= Muntz Jet =

Two-door hardtop convertible

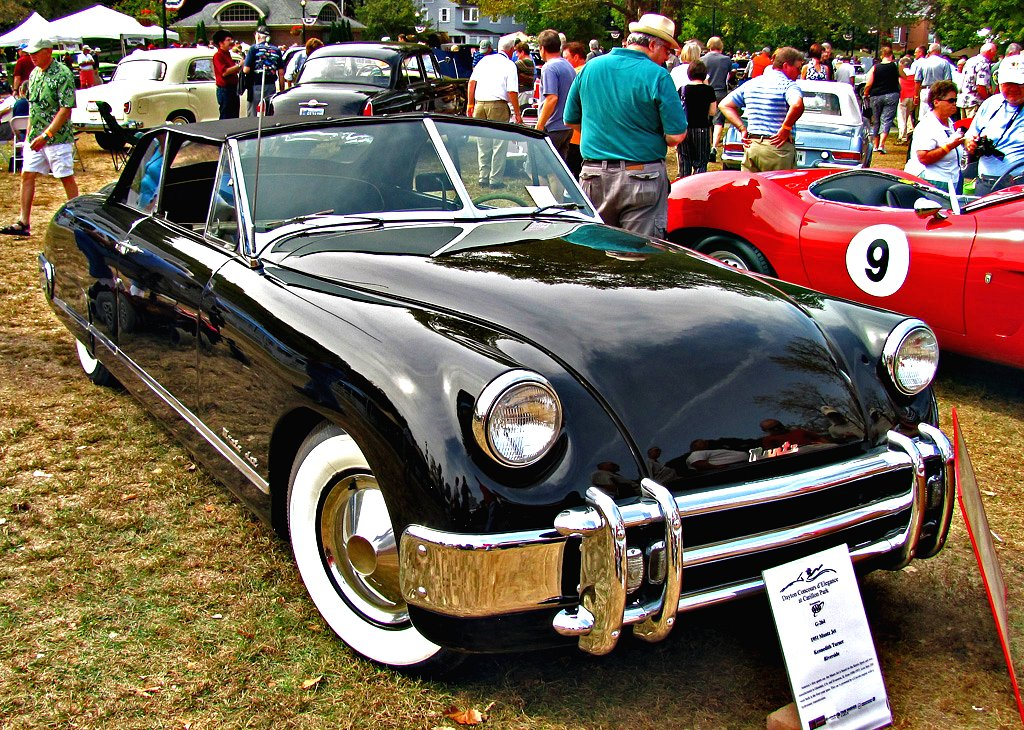
- 1951 Muntz Jet at the Dayton Concours d'Elegance

Overview
- Manufacturer: Muntz Car Company
- Production: c. 1949–1954
- Assembly: United States: Glendale, California; Evanston, Illinois; Chicago, Illinois
- Designer: Frank Kurtis; Sam Hanks

Body and chassis
- Class: Personal luxury car
- Body style: Hardtop convertible coupé

Powertrain
- Transmission: General Motors Hydramatic automatic transmission Three-speed Borg-Warner manual transmission
- Propulsion: 160 hp (120 kW) Cadillac V8; 160 hp (120 kW) Lincoln V8

Dimensions
- Wheelbase: 2,870 mm (113 in)
- Height: 1,372 mm (54 in)
- Curb weight: 1,814 kg (4,000 lb)

Chronology
- Predecessor: Kurtis Sport Car

The Muntz Jet is a two-door hardtop convertible built by the Muntz Car Company in the United States between approximately 1949 and 1954. It is sometimes credited as the first personal luxury car. Developed from the Kurtis Sport Car (KSC) that was designed by Frank Kurtis, it was produced and marketed by Earl "Madman" Muntz. The car was powered by one of two V8 engines, either a 160 hp (120 kW) Cadillac engine or a 160 hp (120 kW) Lincoln engine, and it was equipped with either a General Motors Hydramatic automatic transmission or a three-speed Borg-Warner manual transmission. The Jet was streamlined, featured numerous luxury appointments, and was equipped with safety features that were not standard on most cars of its day, including a padded dashboard and seat belts.

Production of the Muntz Jet occurred in Glendale, California; Evanston, Illinois; and Chicago before ceasing in 1954. The car sold for $5,500 in 1953 (about $51,500 in 2017), but cost $6,500 to produce. In total, Muntz lost approximately $400,000 on the venture. Only 198 Jets were built, an estimated 50 to 130 of which are still in existence. By 2016, fully restored cars had sold for over $100,000 at auction. Author Matt Stone called the Jet "one of the fastest and best-performing American cars of the time" while Muntz claimed that the 1958 Ford Thunderbird was inspired by his Jet.

== Background ==
The Muntz Jet was built by the Muntz Car Company, which was founded by Elgin, Illinois, native Earl "Madman" Muntz. Muntz, who was born in 1914 and attended Elgin High School for three semesters before dropping out, had established a prominent reputation selling television sets and other commercial and consumer electronics. Before founding the Muntz Car Company, Muntz had worked successfully as a used-car salesman and at Kaiser-Frazer dealerships in both Los Angeles and New York City, even earning the sobriquet of "world's largest car dealer". According to automotive journalist Turk Smith, he "made and lost several fortunes" during his lifetime, and he was married to seven different women.

== Design ==
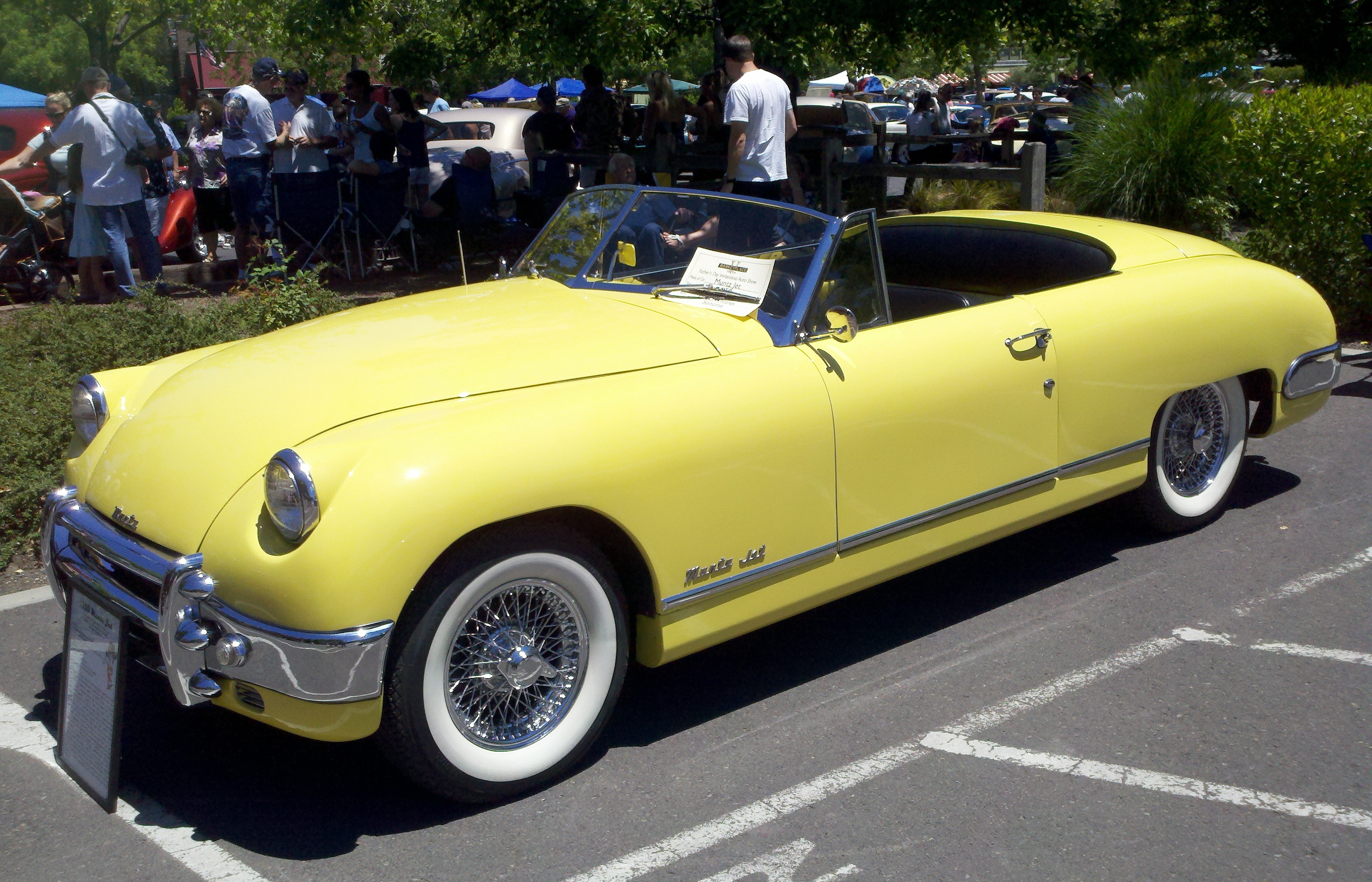
1950 Muntz Jet in Yountville, California

The Muntz Jet was developed from the Kurtis Sport Car (KSC), a two-seat, aluminum-body sports car designed by Frank Kurtis. Muntz bought the rights to the KSC, along with its parts and tooling, from Kurtis Kraft for $200,000. Sam Hanks, who would later win the 1957 Indianapolis 500, contributed to the redesign and re-engineering necessary to create the Muntz. The Jet was built with a solid hardtop. Two different V8 engines were used in the Jet: a 160 hp (120 kW) Cadillac engine, and a 160 hp (120 kW) Lincoln engine. The first Jets to be constructed, in Glendale, California, had the Cadillac engine and aluminum bodies, while those built later in Illinois instead had the Lincoln engine and steel bodies. The cars were equipped with General Motors Hydramatic automatic transmissions, while a three-speed Borg-Warner manual transmission was also available as an option.

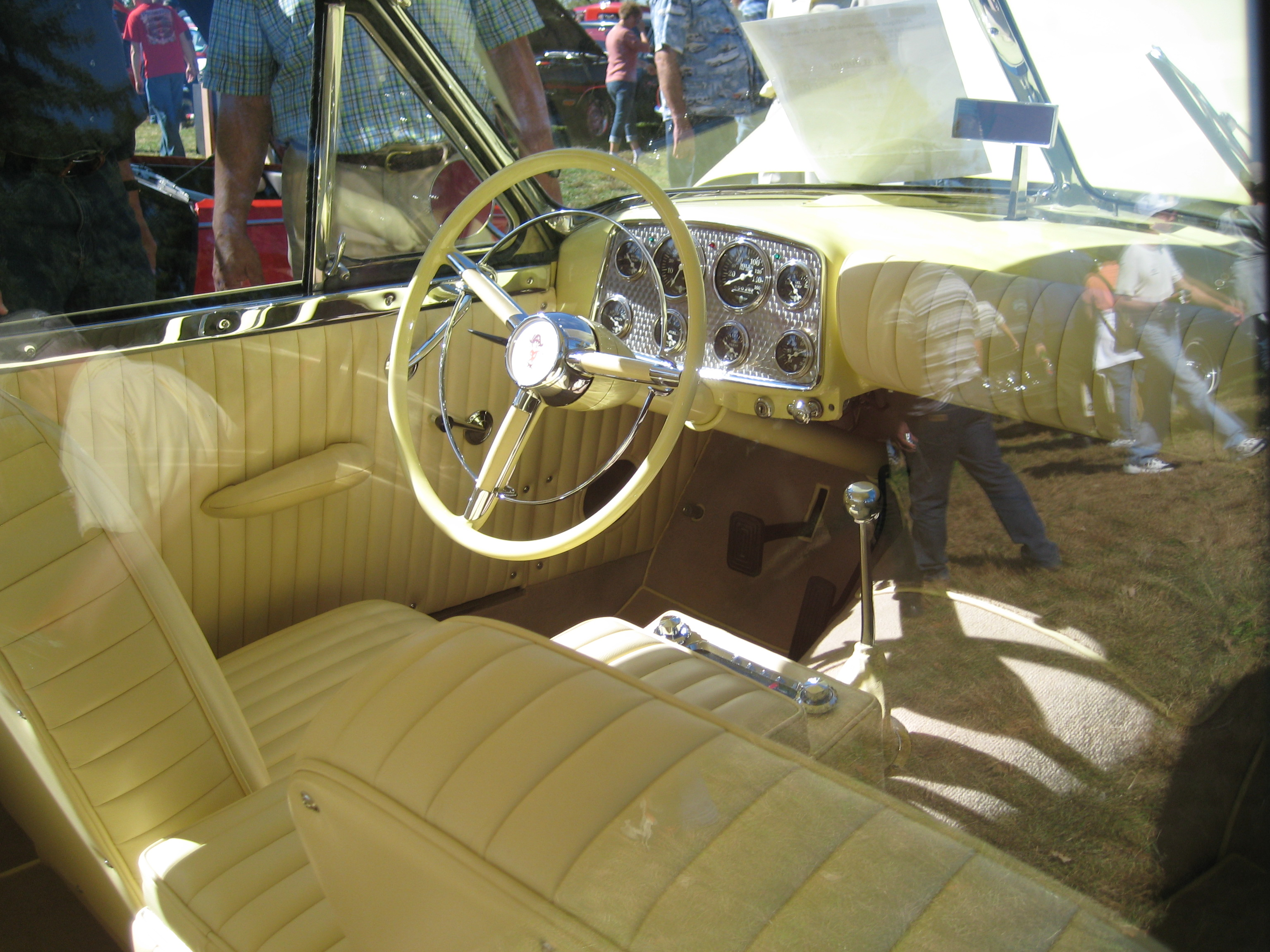
Muntz Jet interior

Compared to its Kurtis predecessor, the Jet was heavier but also more agile and capable of a higher top speed, due to its lower drive ratio. The Muntz was 400 pounds (180 kg) heavier than the KSC, weighing almost 4,000 pounds (1,800 kg). Its wheelbase was 113 inches (290 cm), 10 inches (25 cm) longer in both overall length and wheelbase than the Kurtis, which gave it enough room to include a back seat and accommodate four occupants. The Jet stood 54 inches (140 cm) in height. It was built with body-on-frame construction and had independent front suspension (A-arms with coil springs) and a live rear axle with leaf springs. It also featured power steering, four-wheel hydraulic brakes, dual exhausts, and a dual coil ignition.

In April 1951, Norman Nicholson described the Jet as having "the appearance of a streamlined, scaled-down limousine". It was available in colors such as boy blue and elephant pink. Similar in appearance to the KSC, the Muntz was more luxuriously appointed than its sports car predecessor. Some of these appointments included an all-leather "tuck-and-roll" interior, racing-style Stewart-Warner gauges, and a center console with a Muntz radio. A liquor cabinet and ice chest placed under the rear seat armrests were available as an option. The Jet was equipped with safety features that were not standard on most cars of its day, including a padded dashboard and seat belts.

== Production and sale ==
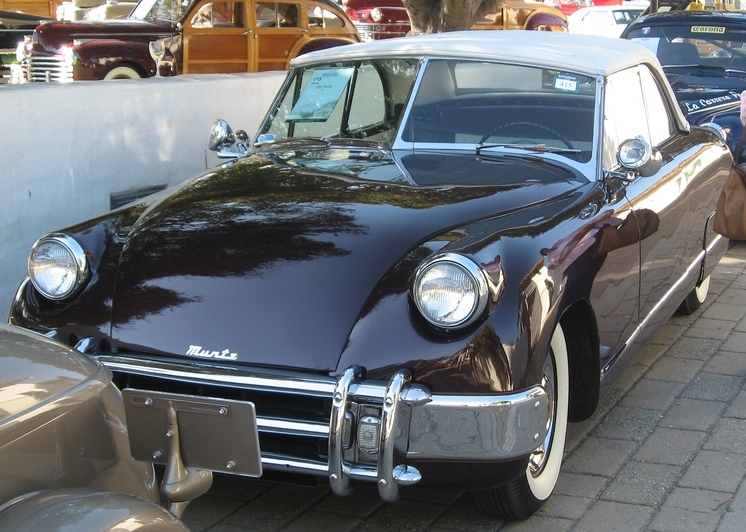
1953 Muntz Jet

The first 26 to 40 Muntz Jets were built in Glendale, California. Production was then moved to a factory at 1000 Grey Avenue in Evanston, Illinois, where the car was built roughly between 1949 and 1952. The near cross-country move was necessitated by difficulties related to materials and transportation that plagued the original plant in Glendale. In April 1951, the Muntz Car Company was employing 40 people in its Evanston factory and producing a car a day. In approximately 1952, the company moved plants again, to 2901 North Sheffield Avenue in Chicago's Lake View neighborhood. Production ceased in 1954.

In January 1951, the projected cost of a Jet was $5,000. That year, Muntz planned to sell the car out of factory-run showrooms in Houston, Los Angeles, and New York City. With no network of dealers, Muntz Jets were sold to customers directly from the factory. The car sold for $5,500 in 1953, about $51,500 in 2017. At the same time, a Cadillac convertible sold for $3,987, and a comparable Lincoln for $3,600. A single Jet cost roughly $6,500 to produce, $1,000 more than its sticker price. Muntz himself estimated that labor costs alone for each Jet produced totaled $2,000. In total, he lost approximately $400,000 on the venture, and after four years gave up on it. Famous owners of the Jet included Clara Bow, Vic Damone, Grace Kelly, Alfred "Lash" LaRue, and Mickey Rooney.

Six Jets were fitted with a factory-installed "hop up" kit that included an Edelbrock aluminum intake and twin double-barreled Stromberg carburetors. Muntz Car Company welding chief Peter Condos claimed that two Jets were built with 331-cubic-inch (5,420 cc) Chrysler FirePower V8 engines.

== Performance ==
Writing in 1951, Norman Nicholson noted a production Muntz Jet had an official top speed of 112 mph (180 km/h). Muntz himself claimed it could accelerate from 0 to 80 mph (130 km/h) in nine seconds. He also stated that the Jet could reach 150 mph (240 km/h), but automotive journalist Turk Smith, writing in 1969, expressed doubt that it could even attain 130 mph (210 km/h).

== Legacy ==
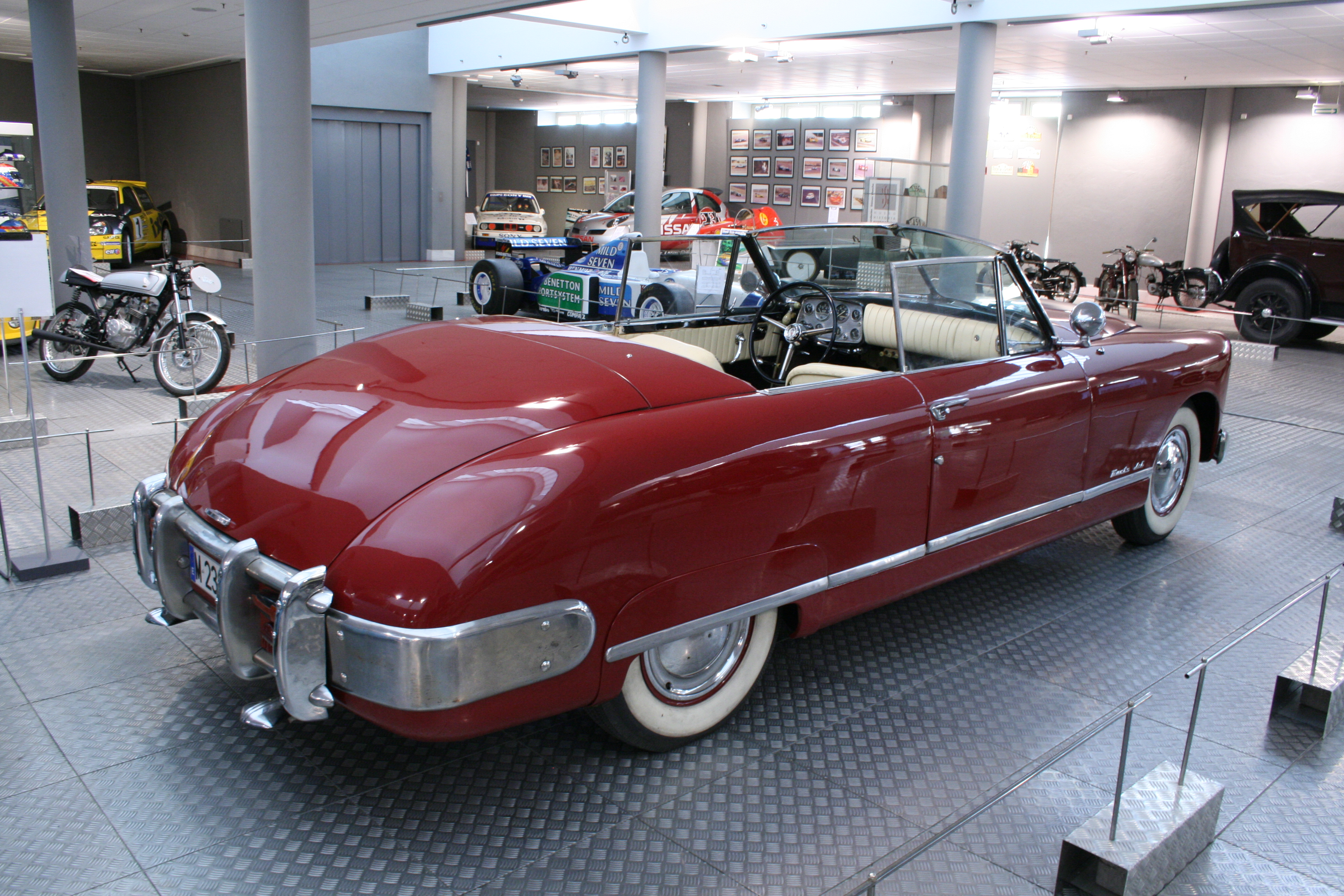
Muntz Jet at the Museo de Historia de la Automoción in Salamanca

In total, 198 Muntz Jets were built. Earlier estimates of 400 cars produced, a figure possibly sourced to Muntz himself, are now thought to be inaccurate. An estimated 50 to 130 of these cars are still in existence. There is no owner's club for the car, although a registry of owners that has accounted for about 125 cars by serial number does exist. Three Jets are owned by the Petersen Automotive Museum in Los Angeles. By 2002, well restored Jets were selling at auction for $50,000 to $70,000. By 2016, fully restored cars had sold for over $100,000 at auction.

In the assessment of Autoweek writer Graham Kozak, while the Jet "lacks the cachet of the Tucker...it stands on its own as a well-conceived, well-executed luxury convertible". According to author Matt Stone, the Muntz was "one of the fastest and best-performing American cars of the time". Turk Smith, writing in 1969, opined that a well tuned Jet "will still outperform most stock cars of today". In 1969, Muntz claimed that the 1958 Ford Thunderbird was inspired by the Jet, and quipped that "I was eight years ahead of my time" with his car.

Thomas E. Bonsall credits the Jet as being the first personal luxury car. In 2000, Daily Herald journalist Jerry Turnquist called it "America's first, high performance, four-seat sports car". It is also an example of an orphan car. After production of the Jet ended in 1954, Muntz invented and manufactured the 4-track Stereo-Pak tape player, the predecessor of the 8-track tape player. In June 2000, Muntz's childhood home of Elgin celebrated the 50th anniversary of the Muntz Jet with a parade featuring numerous Jets and their owners.

== Sources ==
- Lyons, Dan (2005). Cars of the Fantastic '50s. Iola, Wisconsin: Krause Publications. pp. 27–29. ISBN 978-087349-926-2.
- Pace, Harold; Brinker, Mark R. (2004). Vintage American Road Racing Cars: 1950-1969. Saint Paul, Minnesota: MBI Publishing Company. pp. 94–95. ISBN 0-7603-1783-6.
- Stone, Matt (2015). Exotic Barn Finds: Lamborghini, Ferrari, Porsche, Aston Martin and More. North Branch, Minnesota: CarTech. pp. 14–17. ISBN 978-1-61325-202-4.
