= Orphan (car) =

An orphan car is any marque of motor vehicle built by a manufacturer that has discontinued business entirely.

The term is sometimes confused with and inaccurately applied to a discontinued marque from a still-existing vehicle manufacturer (e.g. Oldsmobile, by General Motors) or a sub-marque (e.g. Thunderbird, by Ford Motors).

In the case of a revived marque, a discontinued one revived by a newer company (e.g. Maybach, by mercedes-Benz), only the original vehicles are accurately considered orphans.

== Orphans ==
There are hundreds of orphan automobile brands, and hundreds of defunct manufacturers. Some of the better known orphans are listed below:

- Checker
- DeLorean
- Nash
- Rambler
- American Motors (AMC)
- Hudson
- Studebaker
- Pierce Arrow
- Marmon
- Cord
- Hispano Suiza
- Austin-Healey
- Rover
- Triumph (out of production in 1994; manufacturer defunct; marque acquired by BMW in 1993;dormant)
- Kaiser
- Willys
- Crosley
- Tucker
- Packard
- Clipper
- Saab
- Bricklin
- Sterling
- Sunbeam
- Fisker
- Muntz

== Discontinued marques from existing manufacturers ==
The following are discontinued marques from existing manufacturers (and thus not orphan automobiles).

=== Chrysler Group ===
- DeSoto
- Eagle
- Imperial
- Plymouth
- Talbot

=== Ford Motor Company ===
- Continental
- Edsel
- Mercury
- Merkur
- Frontenac
- Monarch
- Meteor
- Comet

=== General Motors ===
- Marquette
- Geo
- La Salle
- Saturn
- Oakland
- Oldsmobile
- Hummer
- Viking
- Pontiac
- Asüna
- Beaumont
- Holden

=== Volkswagen Group ===
- DKW
- Horch
- Wanderer
- NSU Motorenwerke

=== Steam / Electric ===
- Baker
- Commuter Vehicles, Inc.
- Doble
- Sebring Vanguard
- Stanley
- White
- Coda

== See also ==
- List of automobile manufacturers
- List of car brands
