= Davis Divan =

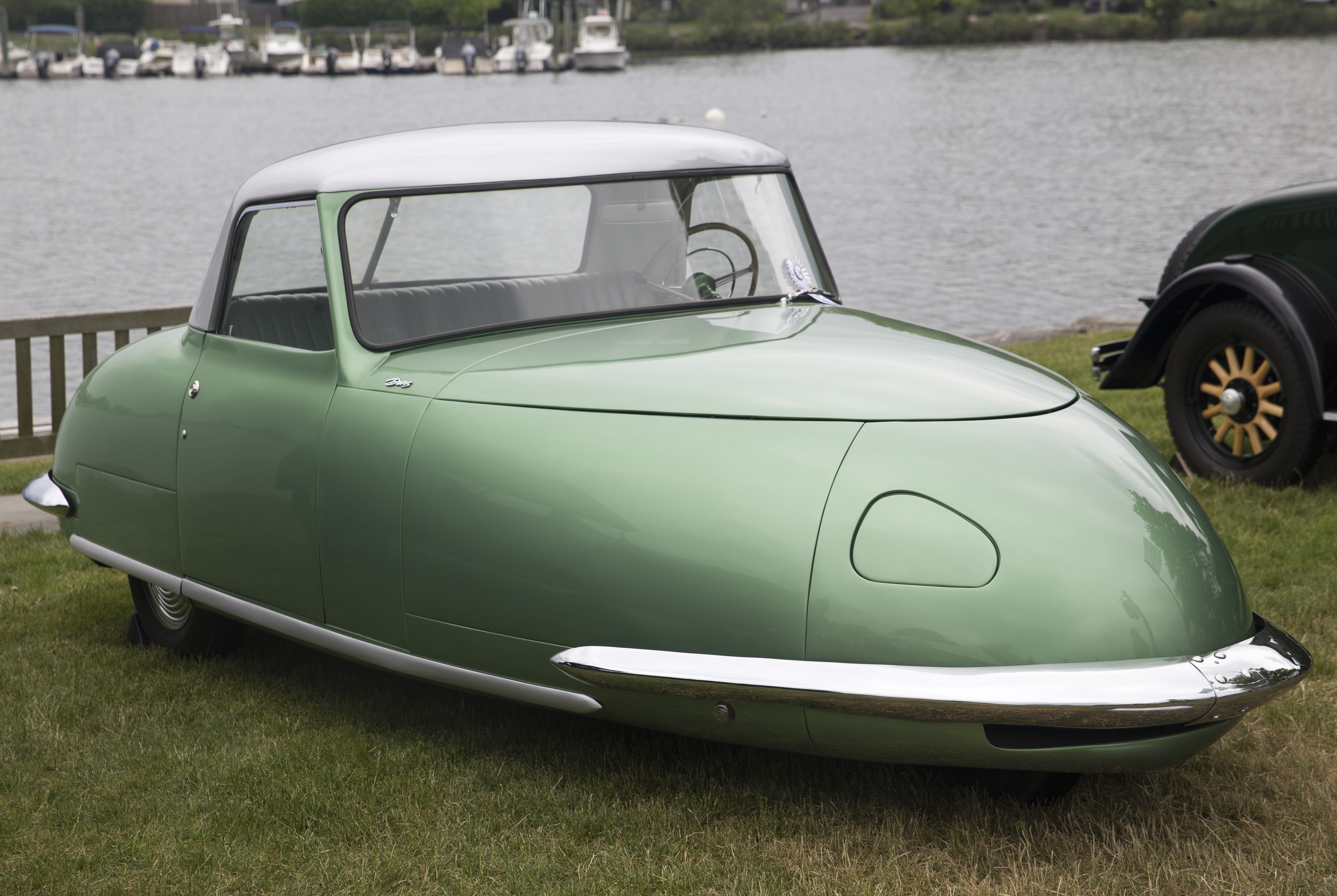
- 1948 Davis Divan

Overview
- Manufacturer: Davis Motorcar Company
- Production: 1947–49
- Assembly: Van Nuys, Los Angeles, California
- Designer: Frank Kurtis; Gary Davis

Body and chassis
- Class: Three-wheeler
- Body style: 2-door convertible

Powertrain
- Engine: 63 hp (47 kW) Continental I4 (gasoline); 47 hp (35 kW) Hercules 4 (gasoline)
- Transmission: 3-speed Borg-Warner manual

Dimensions
- Wheelbase: 109.5 inches (278 cm)
- Length: 183.5 inches (466 cm)
- Width: 72.0 inches (183 cm)
- Height: 60.0 inches (152 cm)
- Curb weight: 2,450 pounds (1,110 kg)

The Davis Divan is a three-wheeled convertible built by the Davis Motorcar Company between 1947 and 1949. The brainchild of used-car salesman Glen Gordon "Gary" Davis, it was largely based upon "The Californian", a custom three-wheeled roadster built by future Indianapolis 500 racing car designer Frank Kurtis for Southern Californian millionaire and racer Joel Thorne. After building two prototypes in 1947, Davis embarked on an aggressive publicity and promotional campaign for the car, which included numerous magazine appearances, a lavish public unveiling at the Ambassador Hotel in Los Angeles, and a promotional trip across the United States.

At the company factory in Van Nuys, employees worked frantically to build Divans, although the model was never put into mass production. Despite raising $1.2 million through the sale of 350 dealerships, the Davis Motorcar Company failed to deliver cars to its prospective dealers or pay its employees promptly, and was ultimately sued by both groups. The company's assets were liquidated in order to pay back taxes, while Gary Davis himself was eventually convicted of fraud and grand theft and sentenced to two years at a "work farm" labor camp.

Only 13 Divans (including the two prototypes) were ever built, of which 12 have survived. The car featured aircraft-inspired styling details as well as disc brakes, hidden headlights, and built-in jacks.

== Background ==
The Davis Divan was the brainchild of Glen Gordon "Gary" Davis, a used-car salesman from Indiana. Its immediate predecessor was a custom three-wheeled roadster called "The Californian", which had been built in 1941 by future Indianapolis 500 racing car designer Frank Kurtis for Southern Californian millionaire and racer Joel Thorne, who was the heir to the Chase bank fortune. For the single front wheel of "The Californian", Kurtis had taken inspiration from the Lockheed P-38 Lightning fighter aircraft, while he also fitted the vehicle with a Ford V8/60 engine and rear axle. In 1945, shortly after moving to Southern California, Davis purchased the car from Thorne. He paid just $50 for it, and while reports about the circumstances of the sale vary, one suggests that Davis may have deliberately crashed the accident-prone vehicle during a test drive to reduce its value to Thorne.

== Development ==
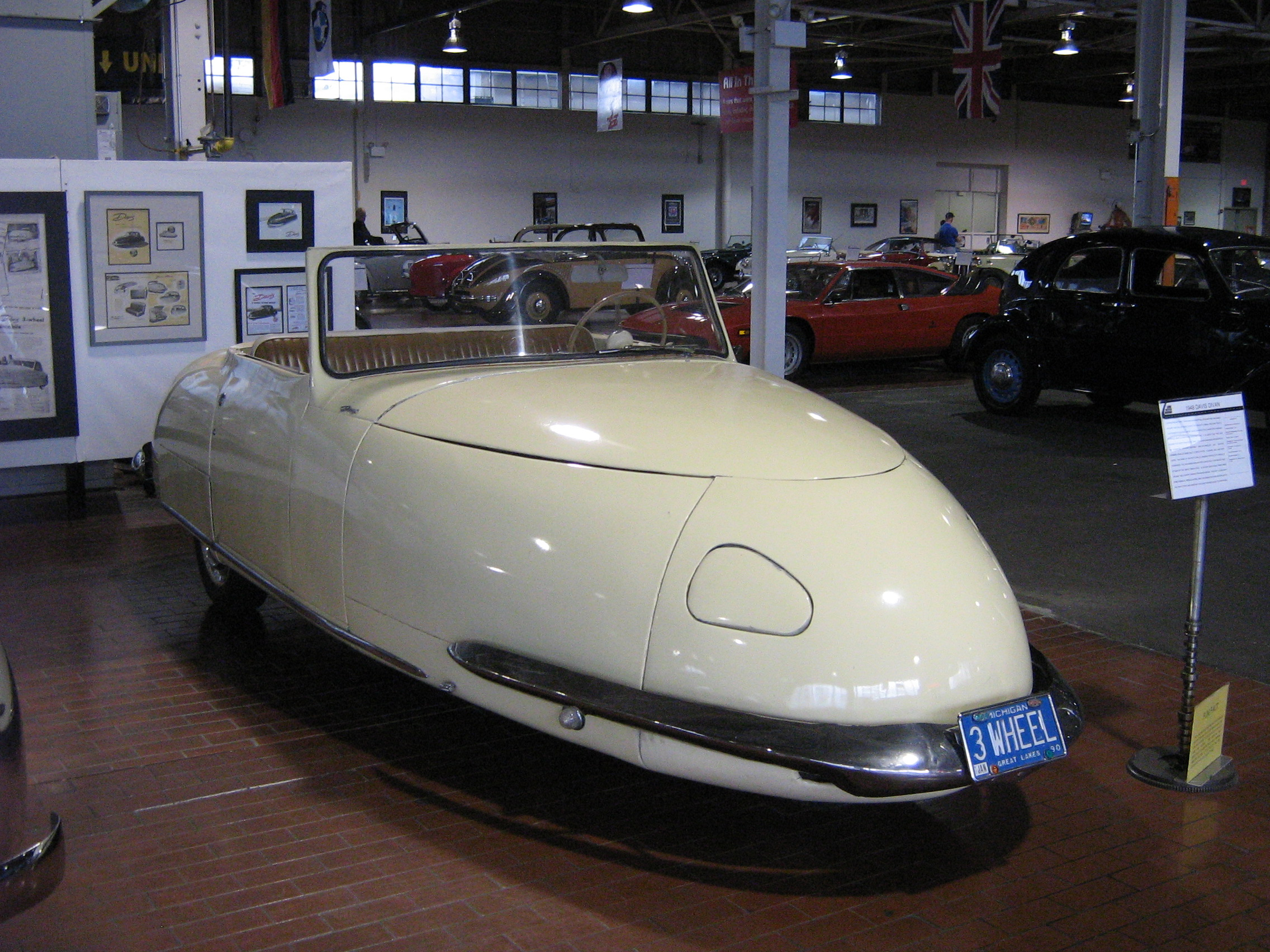
1948 Davis Divan on display at the Lane Motor Museum in 2009

=== Models and prototypes ===
After purchasing "The Californian", Davis intended to reverse engineer it with a group of newly hired engineers, including Peter Westburg from Douglas Aircraft Company. Together they built a 1/4th-scale model of the car, which they then photographed for a Hollywood Citizen-News story on July 22, 1947, in which they claimed their ability to build 50 of the cars a day and sell each for $995. Later that year, Davis secured an investment of $2,500 from the Bendix family, which enabled him to create Davis Motorcar Company; ever conscious of his and his project's image, he borrowed local designer Raymond Loewy's office to make his successful pitch.

In 1947, Davis built two prototypes of what was intended to be an economy car, first the Davis D-1 (nicknamed "Baby") and then the D-2 ("Delta"), the latter of which featured a removable hardtop. While testing "Baby", Davis was able to achieve tire marks with a circumference of just 13 feet (4.0 m), demonstrating the vehicle's impressive turning radius.

=== Publicity and promotion ===
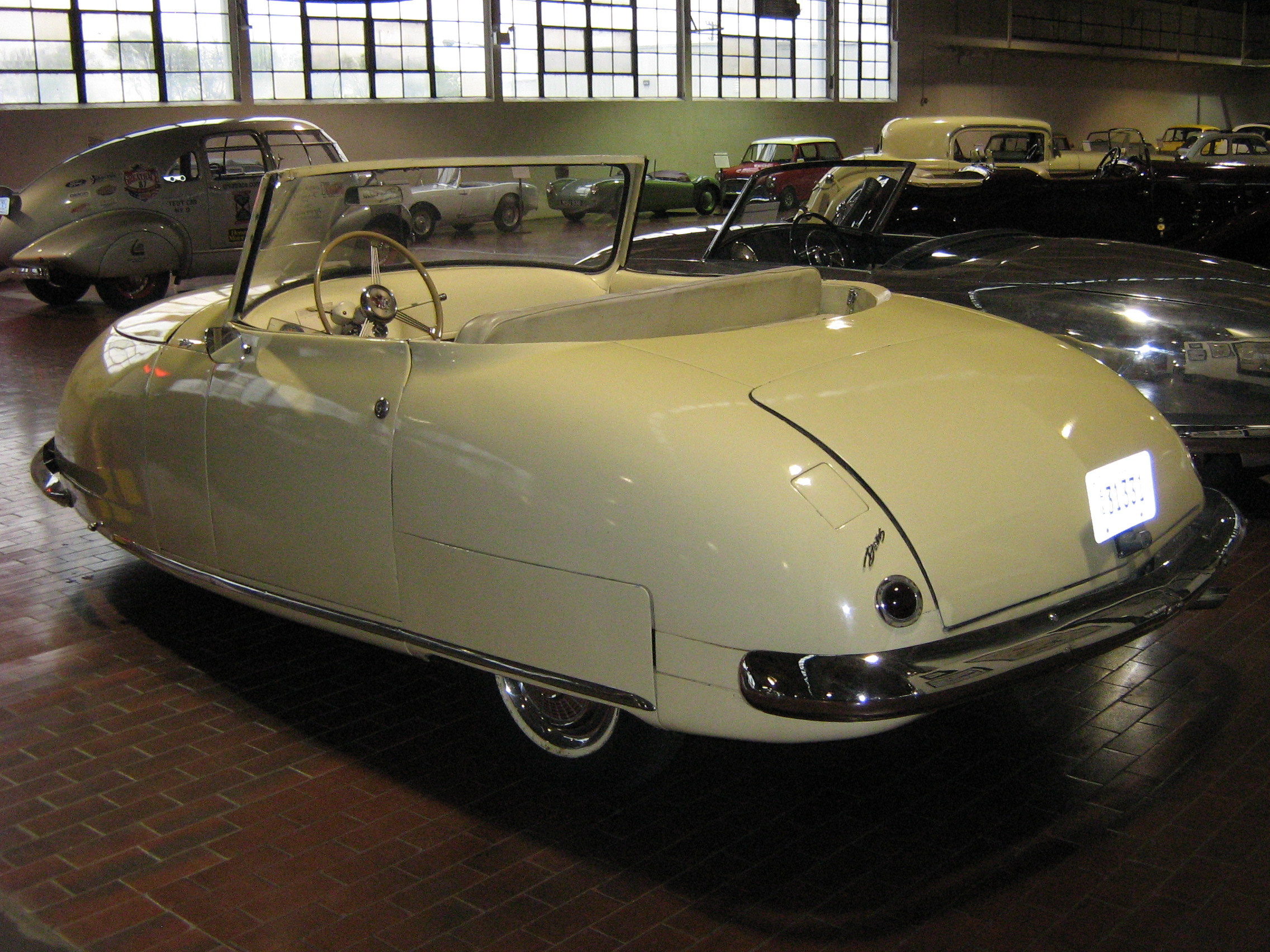
Rear view of a Davis Divan

Looking to capitalize on the booming post-World War II American car market, Davis obtained significant coverage for his new car in prominent magazines such as Business Week, Life, and Parade as well as in a period newsreel and a syndicated television crime drama, The Cases of Eddie Drake. In November 1947, the Davis Divan was publicly unveiled at the Ambassador Hotel in Los Angeles; assisting Davis in handling the event were Jack Adams, a former reporter at The Los Angeles Herald-Express who had been hired to manage public relations for the fledgling company, and Cleo Moore, an actress who had been hired to pose with the "Baby" prototype as a promotional model as well as mingle with the press at the hotel. Also during the event, Davis had four American Airlines stewardesses hired for the occasion sit side by side across the car's single bench seat to demonstrate its ability to carry four adults.

Due partially to the tantalizing pitch for a $1,000 automobile that Davis made, and partially to the positive publicity from the Divan's public unveiling, sales of Davis dealerships increased substantially, which allowed the company to finance a promotional trip across the United States. In the words of Bob Golfen, Davis touted the Divan as "the ultimate car of the future". For additional promotion, "Baby" was repainted and put on display in a Philadelphia department store for the holiday shopping season, after which it was repainted once more in preparation for participating in Pasadena's Rose Parade before the 1948 Rose Bowl.

=== Pre-production ===
At the factory in Van Nuys, the pace of development became frantic, with workers occasionally staying 72 hours at a time and sleeping in a nearby house that Davis had rented. Busy with promoting the Divan, Davis delegated production duties to newly hired Bob "Pinky" Howells. Howells worked feverishly to meet Davis' deadlines, which called for prospective dealers to receive their cars within just 90 days; he ordered a drop hammer press, two gas furnaces, and a set of kirksite dies from a Pasadena tool-and-die maker. However, when he demonstrated his progress to his boss, Davis fired Howells because, as his colleague Westburg put it, "he had spent $45,000 of company money ... on production." At the time, Davis was paying himself a monthly salary of $1,000, and the Davis Motorcar Company had already raised $1.2 million through the sale of 350 dealerships.

=== Demise ===
Increasingly concerned investors began demanding a return on their investments, and as they became less satisfied with Davis' claims, they began arriving at the company's factory unannounced to press the engineers for accurate delivery dates. In early 1949, prospective dealers sued Davis for breach of contract; company employees followed suit in May 1949, as many of them had not been paid for their work after taking an offer from Davis that promised them double pay after production began if they worked for free during the pre-production phase. After a Los Angeles County District Attorney investigation, Davis was convicted on 20 counts of fraud and eight counts of grand theft by a jury in 1951. While the Davis Motorcar Company's assets were liquidated in order to pay back taxes, Davis himself claimed that he could not repay his debts and was instead sentenced to two years at a "work farm" labor camp in Castaic, California.

== Specifications ==
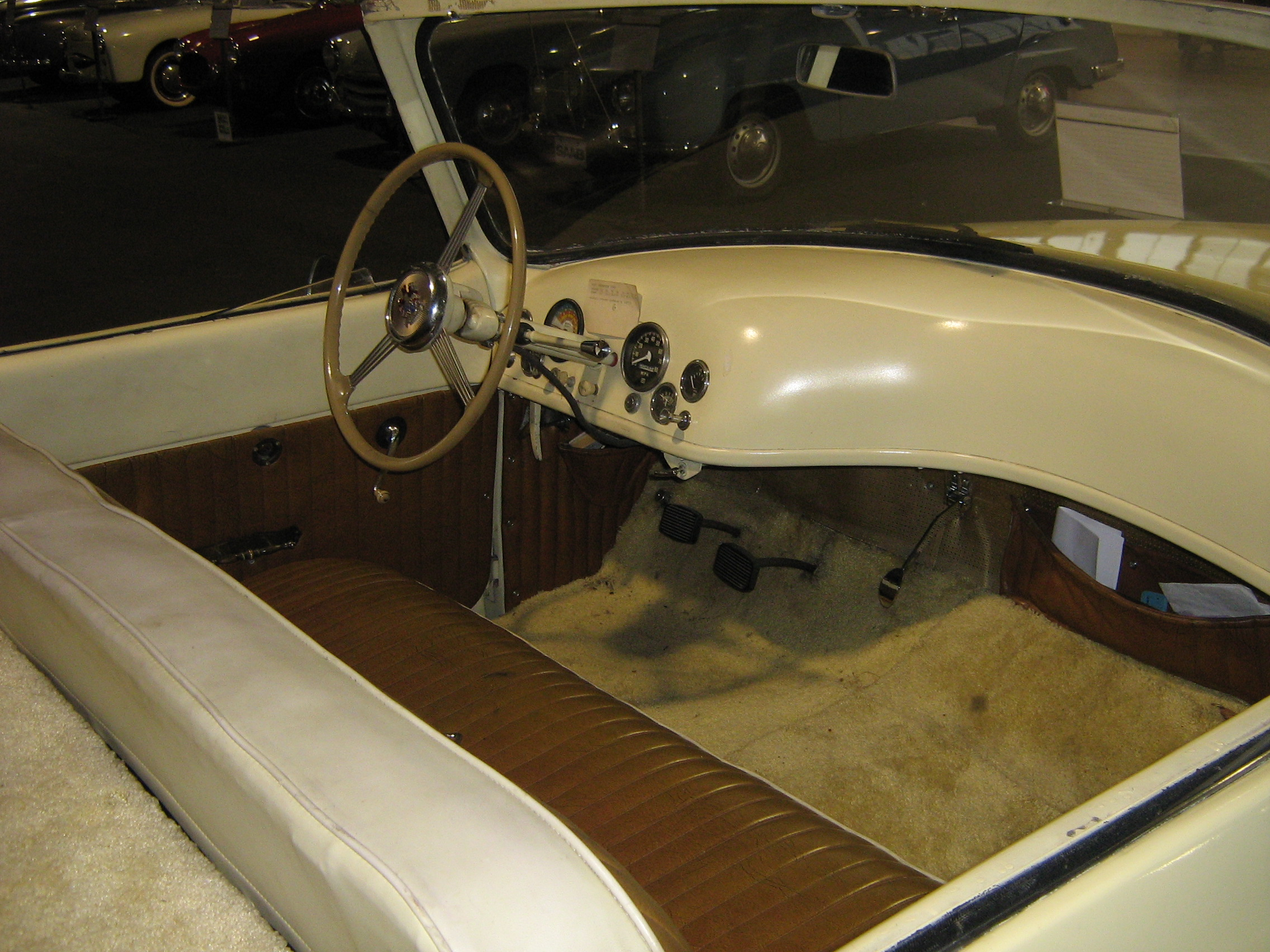
Interior view of a Davis Divan

Between 1947 and 1949, the Davis Motorcar Company produced a total of 16 running vehicles, including 11 pre-production Divans as well as the two prototypes and three military vehicles, which were comparable to Willys Jeeps. All of the Davis models had a single wheel in the front and two wheels at the back of the vehicle. The cars were built in a hangar at Van Nuys Airport that was previously used for aircraft assembly and later acquired by Petersen Aviation.

The Davis Divan measured 183.5 inches (466 cm) in length with a wheelbase of 109.5 inches (278 cm), which was remarkably long for a three-wheeled vehicle; it had a height of 60.0 inches (152 cm) and weighed 2,450 pounds (1,110 kg). With a width of 72.0 inches (183 cm), it was wide enough to seat four passengers abreast on its single bench seat; in fact, this feature had inspired the name of the car, which was the Arabic term for a couch or day bed. The car also featured a removable fiberglass top along with a steel chassis and chrome-trimmed aluminum body, which sported aircraft-inspired styling details, 15-inch (38 cm) wheels, disc brakes, and hidden headlights. The Divan was built with a channel steel frame and 11 body panels made of aluminum and zinc, while the "Baby" prototype had instead been constructed with a tube steel space frame. The finished car boasted jacks built into each of its corners, which allowed for easier tire changing.

Most of the Divans were powered by 2,600 cc (160 cu in), inline-four Continental engines capable of producing 63 hp (47 kW). Others, including both the D-1 "Baby" and D-2 "Delta" prototypes, were instead fitted with 47 hp (35 kW), four-cylinder Hercules industrial engines. The car's drivetrain included a three-speed Borg-Warner manual transmission as well as a Spicer differential.

Claims for the Divan's top speed ranged from 100 mph (160 km/h) to 116 mph (187 km/h), and its fuel economy was estimated to be between 35 miles per US gallon (0.067 L/km) and 50 mpg_{‑US} (0.047 L/km). The car's three-wheeled design resulted in less tire wear while also making it more maneuverable and fairly easy to park, and Davis claimed that it could successfully make a U-turn at 55 mph (89 km/h). Scheduled to retail for $1,600 each, the Divans were never put into mass production or sold to the public before the Davis Motorcar Company's demise, and the cars that had already been built were instead given to creditors.

== Legacy ==
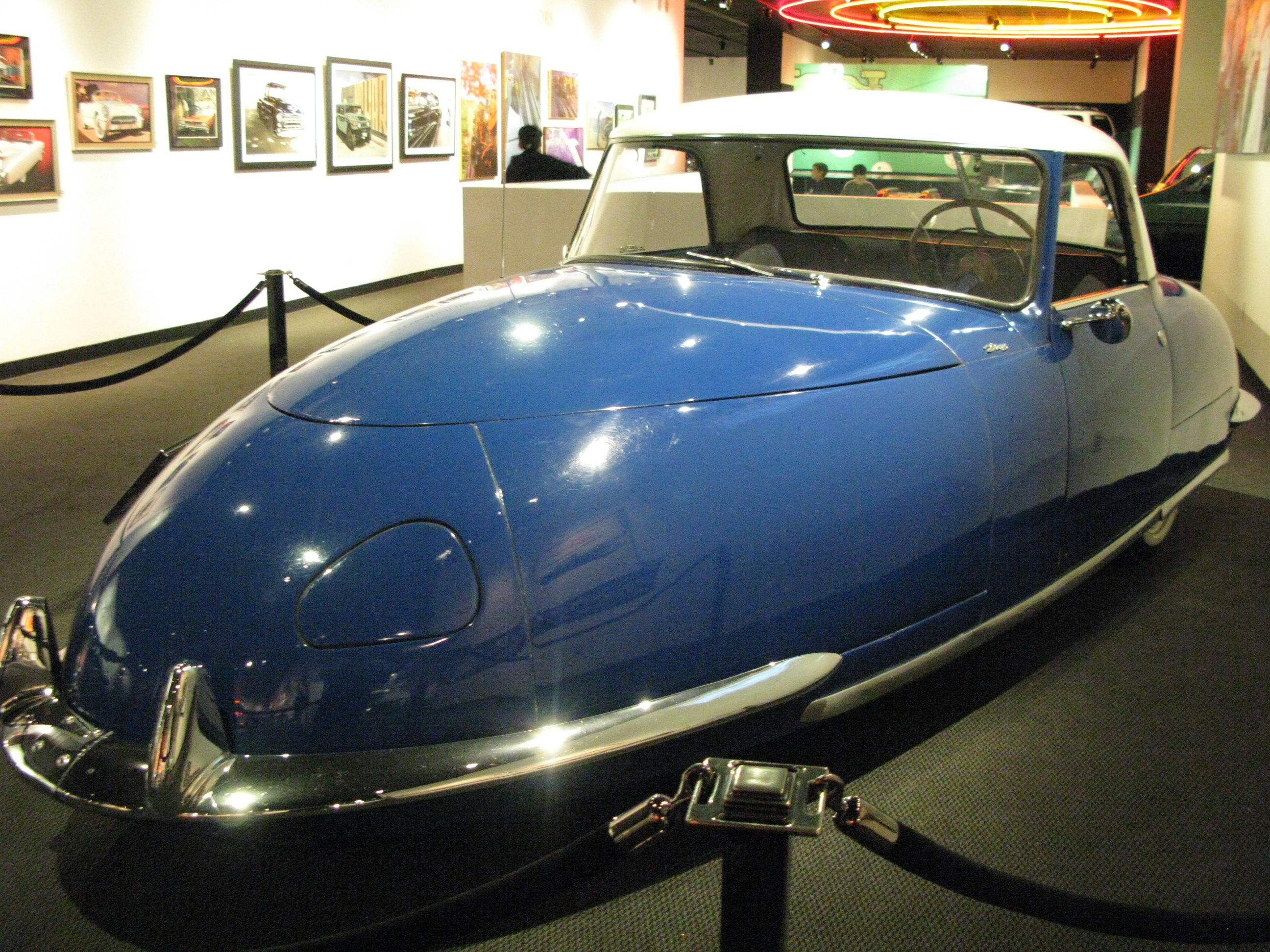
1948 Davis Divan on display at the Petersen Automotive Museum in 2009

While Davis himself was ultimately convicted of fraud, he maintained his innocence throughout his life. He dabbled with numerous other projects and ventures, perhaps the most notable of which was creating Dodge 'Em bumper cars, which then became popular amusement park attractions. Later, he tried to adopt the Dodge 'Em's wraparound bumpers into a design for a safer three-wheeled road car before he retired to Palm Springs and finally died from emphysema in 1973. His vehicles would occasionally make appearances in popular media, including in the Zippy the Pinhead comic strip and the Discovery Channel television program Chasing Classic Cars.

As of 2005, 12 of the 13 Davis Divans (including the two prototypes) have been confirmed to have survived, with the exception having been destroyed in the United Kingdom due to British customs laws; there are survivors owned by museums, collectors, and no one at all, while their conditions vary widely. The three Davis military vehicles were tested by the United States Army at its Aberdeen Proving Ground in Maryland but ultimately not purchased, although all three of them are believed to have survived. After discovering an abandoned Divan in 1967, Tom Wilson of Ypsilanti, Michigan founded the Davis Registry in 1993 to identify and locate surviving Davis vehicles. 1948 Divans are owned and displayed by both the Lane Motor Museum and the Petersen Automotive Museum, the latter of which was featured in an exhibition entitled "What Were They Thinking? The Misfits of Motordom".

In April 2015, the Petersen Automotive Museum launched a crowdfunding campaign on Indiegogo for restoring its Divan, setting a goal of $30,000 to cover the projected costs of mechanical and body work on the car as well as repainting it a period-correct color. The crowdfunding project was intended to raise awareness about the Divan as well as to fund the restoration project. Before being acquired by the Petersen, this individual car spent many years mounted on a pole outside a Colorado body shop. According to the museum, the Divan's engine and suspension required complete rebuilding while the interior of the car was also in need of replacement. It expected the project to be labor-intensive and replacement parts to be difficult to procure. Chief curator Leslie Kendall notes that $10,000 of the $30,000 budget was to be allotted for bodywork and paint, $7,500 for the engine and other under-the-hood components, $5,000 for the interior, and $7,500 for "other mechanical systems" (including the transmission, suspension, and brakes) as well as miscellaneous costs. As one of only a handful of automakers based in Southern California, the Davis Motorcar Company and its vehicles are of particular interest to the museum. The Petersen hoped to have the restoration complete by December 2015, in time for its grand reopening, at which point it plans to add the Divan to its "Innovation" section. By November 2015, the Petersen's car had been restored by Bodie Stroud Industries in a project that was featured on the television program American Restoration.

== See also ==
- Crosley
- Kaiser-Frazer
- Keller (automobile)
- King Midget
- Playboy Automobile Company
- Reliant Robin
- Stout Scarab
- Tucker 48
