= Davis Motorcar Company =

Defunct American motor vehicle manufacturer

- Type: Automobile Manufacturing
- Industry: Automotive, Military
- Genre: Three-wheeled cars
- Founded: 1947
- Founder: Glenn Gordon "Gary" Davis
- Defunct: 1948
- Fate: Defunct
- Headquarters: Van Nuys, California, United States
- Area served: United States
- Products: Vehicles

The Davis Motorcar Company was an American automobile manufacturer based in Van Nuys, in the San Fernando Valley region of Los Angeles, California, which produced three-wheeled automobiles from 1947 to 1948. Phil Patton, writing in the New York Times, noted that in total the company produced 13 vehicles.

== History ==
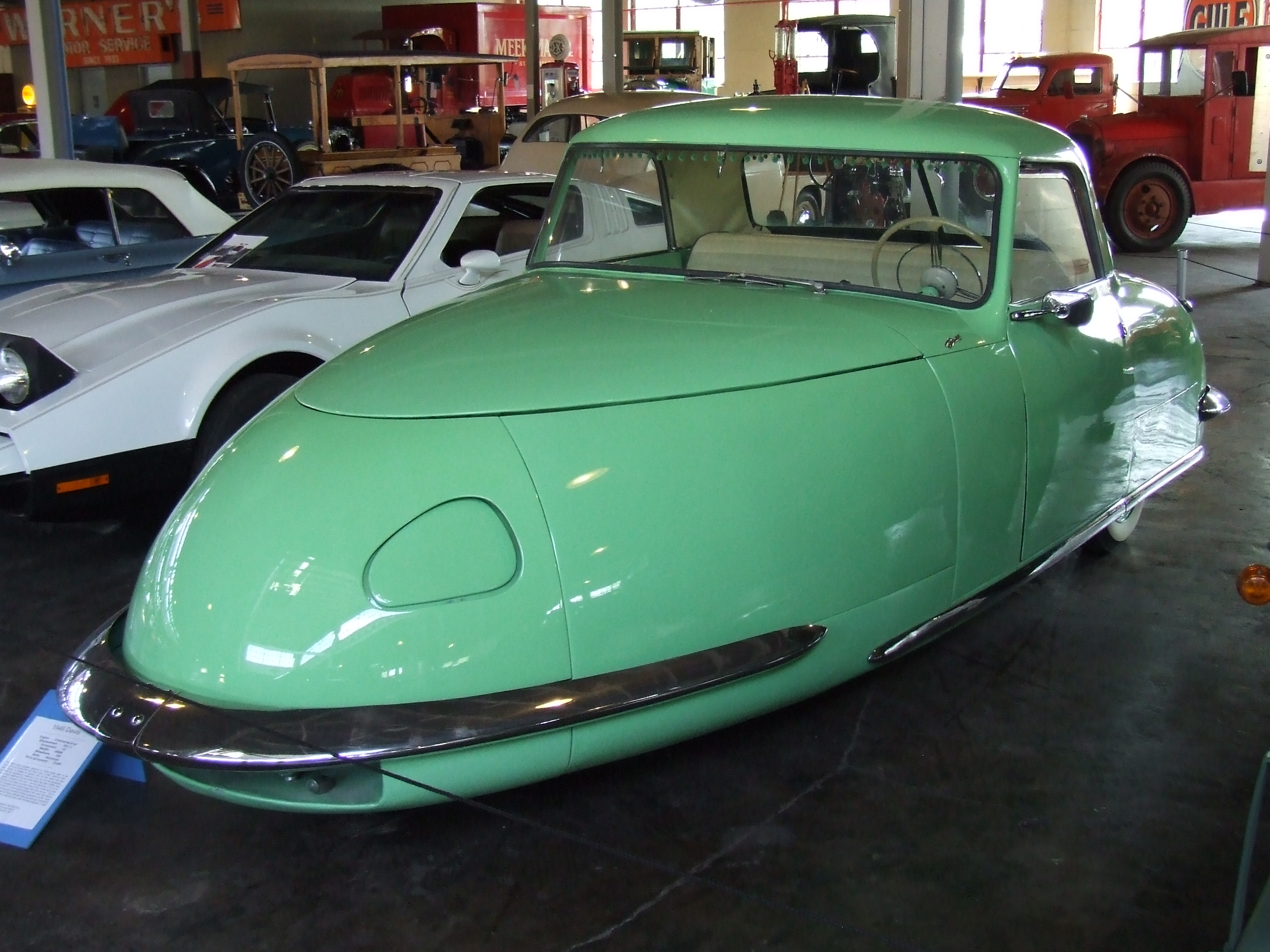
Davis D-2 Divan, at the National Automotive and Truck Museum, Auburn, IN.

Founder Glenn Gordon "Gary" Davis (d. 1973) acquired a prototype called "The Californian" from designer Frank Kurtis, who built it for millionaire racecar driver Joel Thorne.

Davis operated in a 57,000 sq. ft. former aircraft assembly building in Van Nuys, where a prototype three-wheeler named "Baby" was built. Baby was powered by a 47 horsepower Hercules 4-cylinder engine coupled to a Borg-Warner 3-speed transmission and Spicer rear end. Baby was unique in that it featured four-across seating. It was planned that production, beginning in 1948, would start at a minimum of 50 cars a day later increasing to 1,000. A second prototype called "Delta" was built, and a third prototype, the model 482, was completed later. The third model, the "Divan", established standards for the production Davis cars.

== Bankruptcy and Wind-Down ==
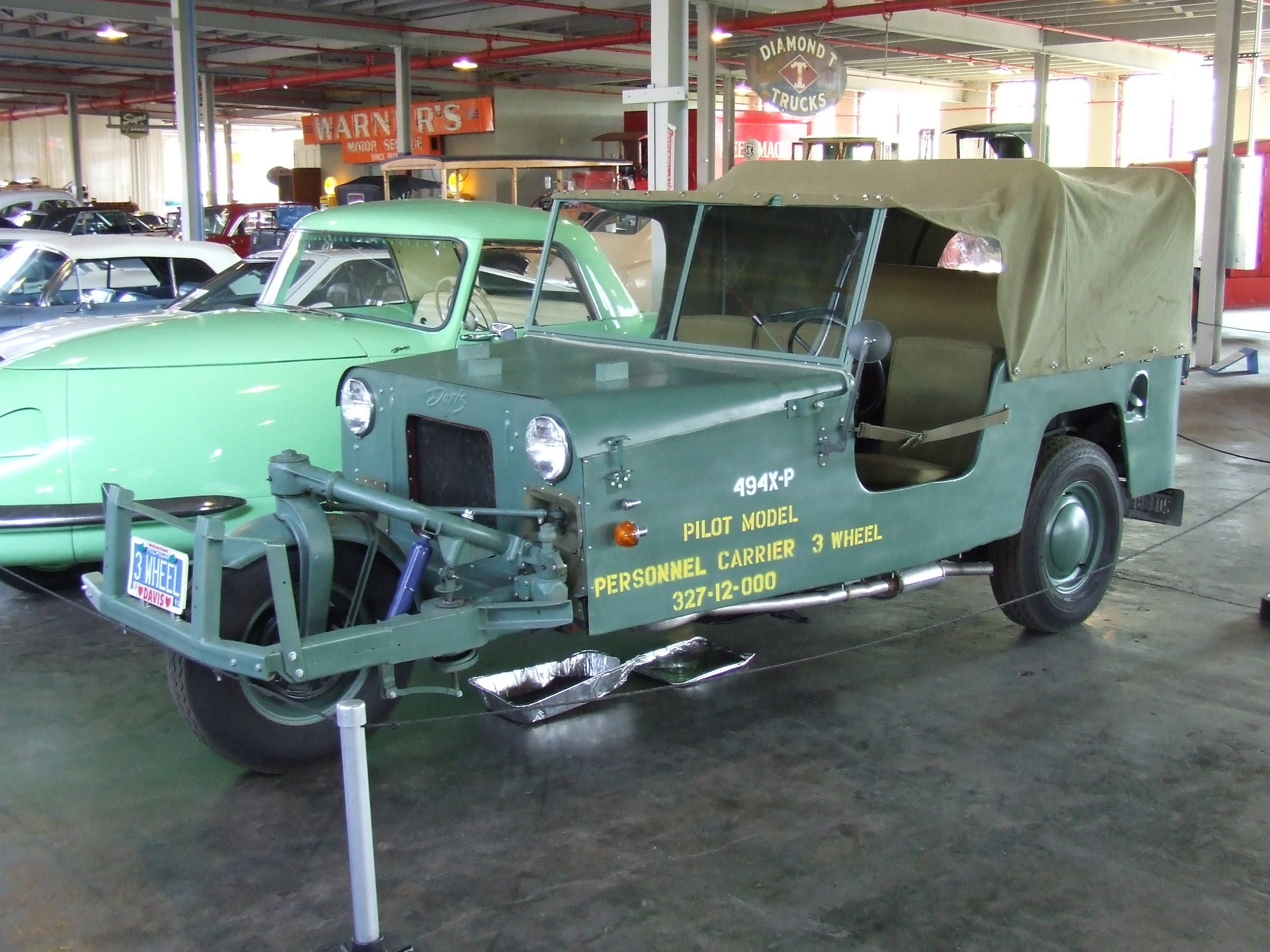
Davis 494, at the National Automotive and Truck Museum, Auburn, IN

While the Company excelled at marketing its business to customers and investors, Davis, like many other auto manufacturers at the time, encountered extreme difficulties with getting its vehicles through production.

The company faced mounting tensions as dealerships and customers who ordered Divans waited through successive missed delivery deadlines while receiving no updates from the Company.

By 1948, the Company was bankrupt and began to wind down its operations. Workers and engineers cited unpaid funds, and lawsuits were threatened by investors and dealers. Former employees then filed suit for back pay, and the company was investigated on allegations of fraud. Soon after the Davis plant was shut down, Gary Davis was convicted on 20 of 28 counts of theft (he was acquitted on four counts of theft and four of fraud) and was sentenced to 8 months to two years of labor in a work farm prison camp.

Davis developed a variant for military use. The Model 494 was a Jeep-like version of the Divan with an open body. Arrangements were ongoing with the Pentagon to run tests at the Aberdeen Proving Grounds in Maryland. Ultimately three 494s were built in less than a week, two of which were shipped to the Army for testing.

The assets of Davis were sold for back taxes in May 1950. The remainder of the company now belongs to Wayne Miller who resides in Arizona.

== Delta Motor Car Company ==
Sixteen out of 300 franchise holders formed Delta Motor Car Company in an effort to salvage the car and their investments. Delta tried to have Reliant Engineering Company in Staffordshire, England, manufacture the car in 1953, but investor funds ran out and the enterprise folded.

== Bibliography ==
- David Burgess Wise, The New Illustrated Encyclopedia of Automobiles ISBN 0-7858-1106-0
- Michael Lamm, Special-Interest Autos magazine, Vol.1, No. 1, Sept.-Oct. 1970
