= Muntz Car Company =

Former american car manufacturer

- Company type: Private
- Industry: Automotive
- Founded: 1950
- Founder: Earl Muntz
- Defunct: 1954
- Headquarters: Evanston, Illinois, Glendale, California, United States
- Area served: United States
- Key people: Earl Muntz, Founder; Frank Kurtis, Designer
- Products: Performance vehicles

The Muntz Car Company was an automobile manufacturer based in the United States.

== History ==
The company was established in 1950 in Glendale, California by Earl "Madman" Muntz, a well known local used car dealer and electronics retailer. Muntz was assisted by Frank Kurtis, who had earlier attempted to produce a sports car under the Kurtis Kraft marque (the Kurtis Kraft Sport, which sold just 36 units by 1950).

In 1951, Kurtis sold the license to manufacture the cars to Muntz, who rebadged them as the "Muntz Jet", extended the body to make it a 4-seater, and exchanged the Ford engine with a larger Cadillac V8. Later, this engine would be replaced with a less expensive Lincoln side-valve V8.

The car, a sports coupe, was first built in Glendale, but manufacture soon moved to a new factory in Evanston, Illinois. It featured its own unique design, with aluminum body panels and a removable fiberglass top that were manufactured in-house. Other parts (such as the engines) were sourced from other manufacturers. It was capable of 112 mph, a significant achievement for a road car at the time. It was featured on the cover of the September 1951 issue of Popular Science (with a Jaguar and an MG).

The company managed to build and sell only about 400 cars during 1951–1954, and due to the high manufacturing cost, Muntz himself estimated that his company lost about $1,000 on each car; this eventually caused him to close the company.

Muntz Jets today are considered rare and valuable collector pieces.

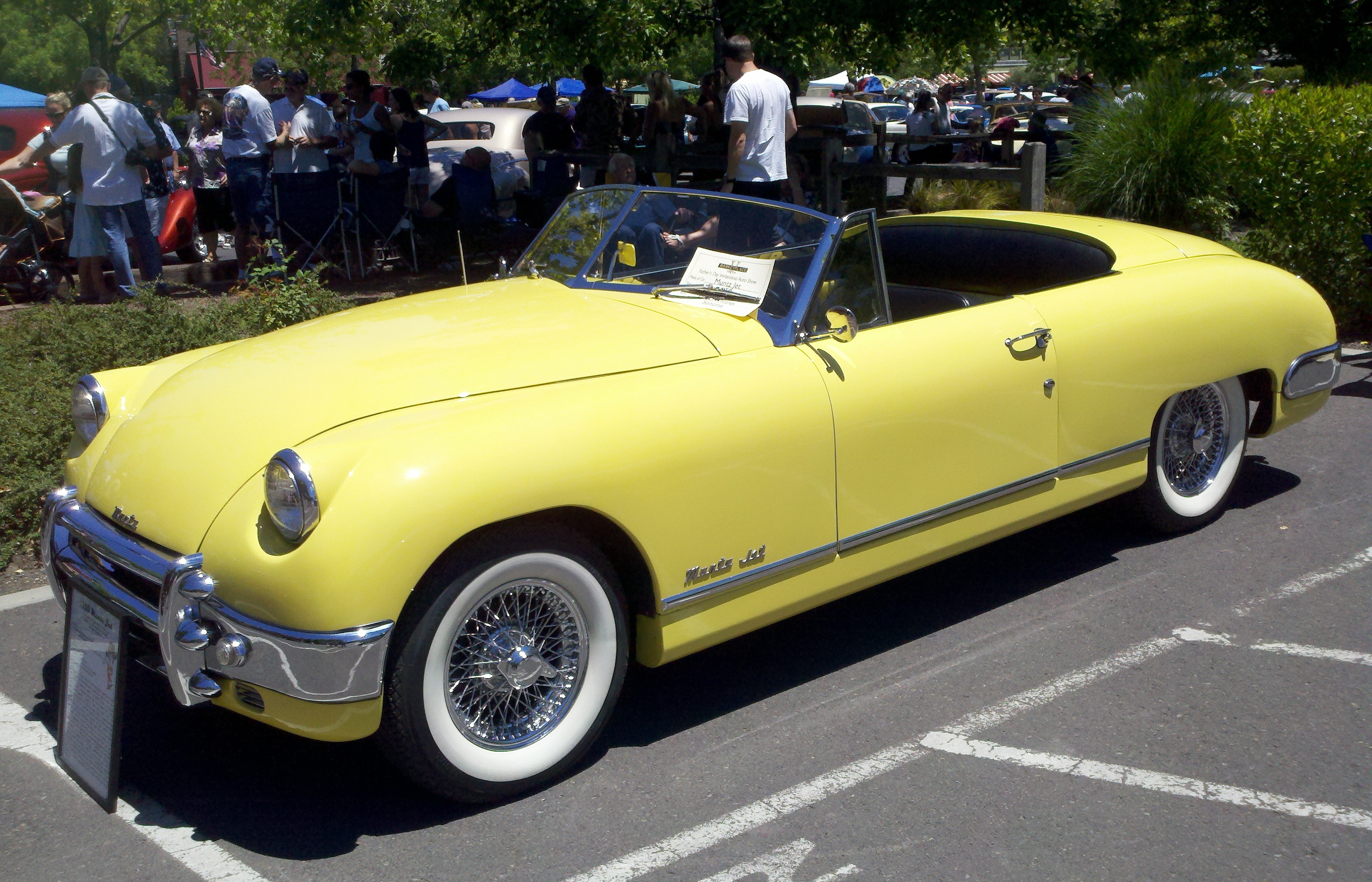
Yellow 1950 Muntz Jet

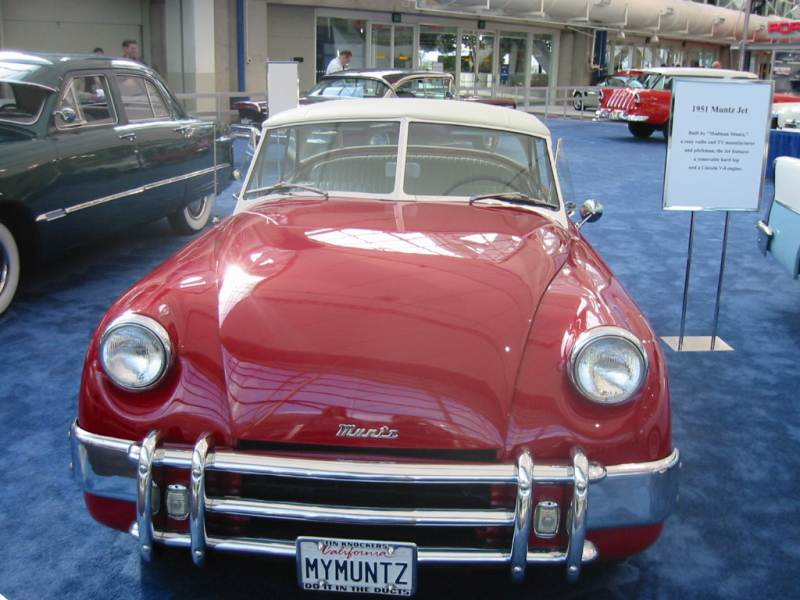
"Mars Red" Muntz Jet

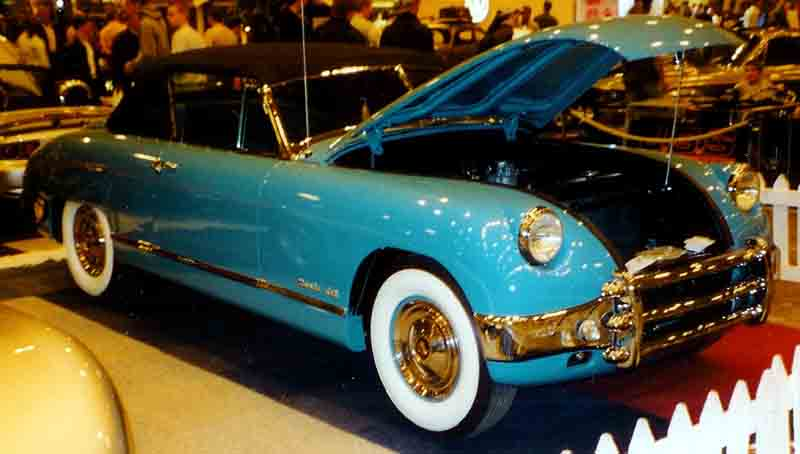
"Stratosphere Blue" Muntz Jet
