= Madman Muntz =

American businessman and engineer (1914–1987)

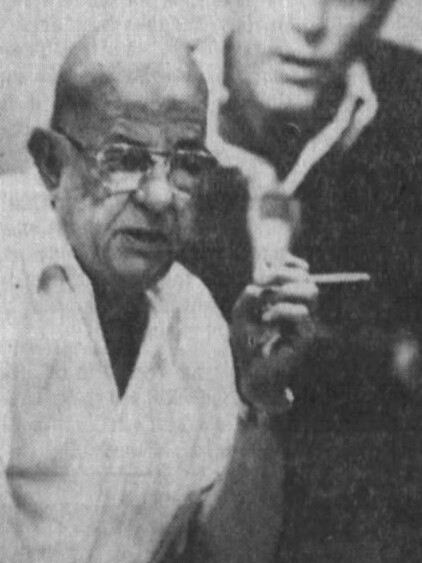
- Muntz in 1975
- Born: Earl William Muntz; January 3, 1914; Elgin, Illinois, US
- Died: June 21, 1987 (aged 73); Rancho Mirage, California, US
- Occupations: Electrical engineer; Businessman; Entrepreneur; Television commercial actor

Earl William "Madman" Muntz (January 3, 1914 – June 21, 1987) was an American businessman and engineer who sold and promoted cars and consumer electronics in the United States from the 1930s until his death in 1987. He was a pioneer in television commercials with his oddball "Madman" persona; an alter ego who generated publicity with his unusual costumes, stunts, and outrageous claims. Muntz also pioneered car stereos by creating the Muntz Stereo-Pak, better known as the 4-track cartridge, a predecessor to the 8-track cartridge developed by Lear Industries.

He invented the practice that came to be known as Muntzing, which involved simplifying otherwise complicated electronic devices. Muntz produced and marketed the first black-and-white television receivers to sell for less than $100, and created one of the earliest functional widescreen projection TVs. He was credited with coining the abbreviation "TV" for television, although the term had earlier been in use in call letters for stations such as WCBS-TV. A high school dropout, Muntz made fortunes by selling automobiles, TV receivers, and car stereos and tapes. A 1968 Los Angeles Times article noted that in one year he sold $72 million worth of cars; five years later he sold $55 million worth of TV receivers, and in 1967 he sold $30 million worth of car stereos and tapes.

After his success as a used car salesman and with Kaiser-Frazer dealerships in Los Angeles and New York City, Muntz founded the Muntz Car Company, which made the "Muntz Jet", a sports car with jet-like contours. The car was manufactured between 1951 and 1953, although fewer than 400 were produced.

Muntz married seven times. His wives included actress Joan Barton (who appeared in Angel and the Badman with John Wayne) and Patricia Stevens of the Patricia Stevens finishing schools. Phyllis Diller was among his many girlfriends. He was friends with celebrities such as singer Rudy Vallee, comedian Jerry Colonna, actor Bert Lahr, television presenter Dick Clark, and cowboy actor Gene Autry.

== Early career: 1922–1953 ==
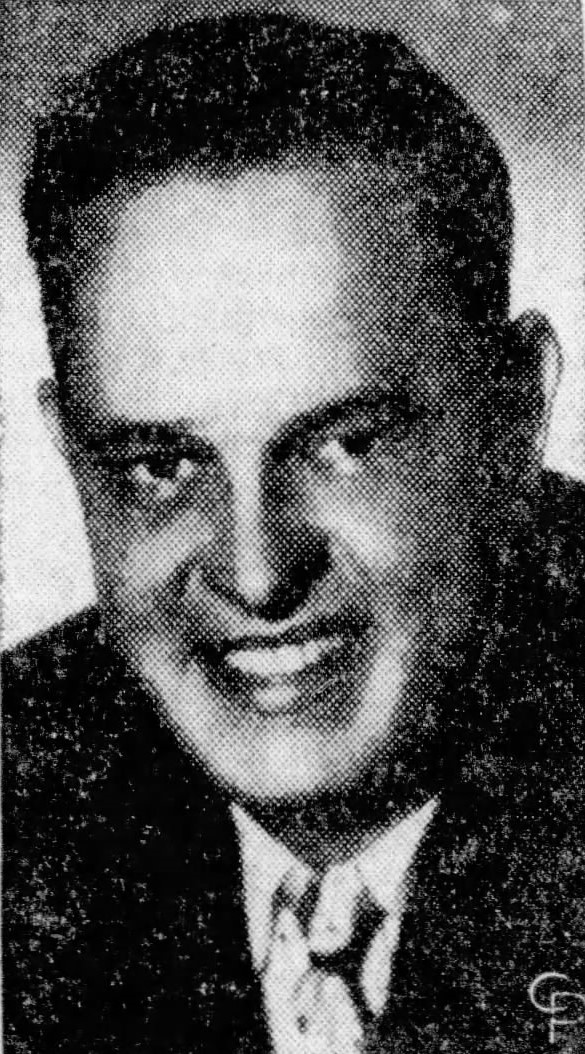
'Madman' Muntz in 1947

Muntz was fascinated by electronics from an early age. He built his first radio at age 8 and built another for his parents' car at age 14. During the Great Depression, at age 15, he dropped out of Elgin High School to work in his parents' hardware store in Elgin, Illinois.

=== Car sales ===
An example of a matchbook ad for Muntz car lots in the 1950s

In 1934, Muntz opened his first used car lot, in Elgin, with a $500 ($12,000 in 2025) line of credit. He was only 20 years old, and his mother had to sign the car-sale papers because legally he was too young to close his own deals. During a vacation in California, Muntz discovered that used cars sold there for far higher prices, so he moved to California in 1940 at age 26 to open a used car lot in Glendale. On a hunch, he purchased 13 brand-new right-hand-drive vehicles to resell. These vehicles had been built for customers in Asia, but could not be delivered due to World War II. One vehicle was a custom-made Lincoln built for Chiang Kai-shek. Local newspapers ran stories about the unusual cars, and Muntz sold them all within two weeks, still in their original shipping crates. Muntz soon opened a second lot in Los Angeles and closed his lot in Elgin.

Muntz rejected the then-common opinion that used car salesmen should project a staid image. He realized the possibilities of generating publicity with odd stunts, and developed a "Madman" persona as a result. His flamboyant billboards and oddball television and radio commercials soon made him famous. In his used auto commercials, he marketed one model as the "daily special"; Muntz claimed that if the car did not sell that day, he would smash it to pieces on camera with a sledgehammer. Another notorious Muntz used-car TV pitch was "I buy 'em retail and sell 'em wholesale ... it's more fun that way!" His commercials generated so much publicity that comedians such as Bob Hope, Jack Benny, and Steve Allen often tried to outdo each other during television appearances by telling "Madman" Muntz jokes. University of Southern California fans would spell out Muntz's name during halftime as a prank.

During the war, the Office of Price Administration sought to suspend Muntz' license to sell automobiles subject to price control. On August 1, 1945, Muntz was acquitted of an O.P.A. charge of violating used car regulations by Superior Judge Reuben H. Schmidt in Los Angeles.

Muntz's car lots became tourist attractions due to the widespread publicity from his television commercial appearances. A 1946 survey by Panner Motor Tours revealed that they ranked seventh among tourist attractions in Southern California. Muntz was willing to take large risks in his attempts to generate publicity. During the era of McCarthyism, he asked one of his advisers, "Do you think I'd make the front pages if I joined the Communist Party?"

=== Muntz Jet ===
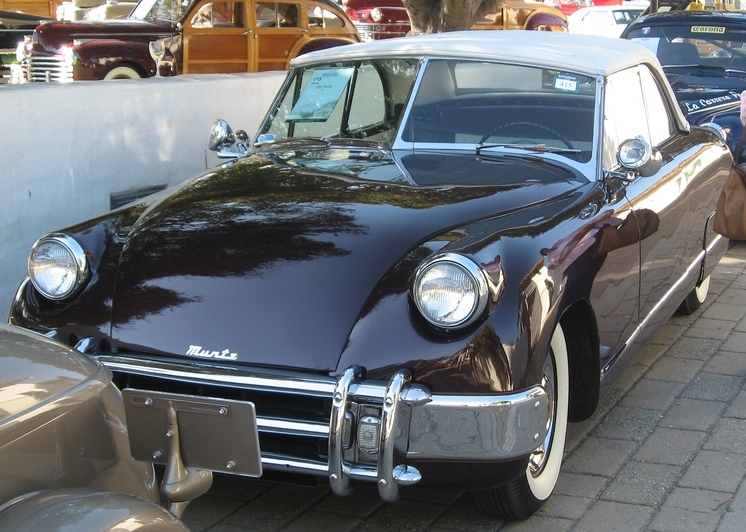
A mint-condition 1953 Muntz Jet at a Monterey, California, classic car auction

In 1948, race car designer and Kurtis-Kraft founder Frank Kurtis attempted to market a new sports car, the two-seater Kurtis Kraft Sport. Only 36 units had been sold by 1950. In 1951, for just $200,000 ($2.5 million in 2025) Kurtis sold the cars' manufacturing license to Muntz, who quickly rebadged them as the "Muntz Jet". Initial production of the Jet took place in Glendale, where Muntz extended the two-seater Kurtis Kraft Sport's body by 13 inches (33 cm), making it a four-seater, and exchanged the Ford V8 engine for a larger Cadillac V8. Later, after making just 28 Jets in California, Muntz moved production to a new factory in Evanston, Illinois, extended the body further by 3 inches (8 cm), and replaced the Cadillac V8 with a less expensive Lincoln sidevalve V8.

The Jet was featured on the cover of the September 1951 issue of Popular Science along with a Jaguar and an MG. It featured its own design, with aluminum body panels and a removable fiberglass top. Paint schemes were extravagant, with names like "Mars Red", "Stratosphere Blue", and "Lime Mist", and interior options included alligator or Spanish leatherette. The backseat armrests contained a full cocktail bar.

The Jet was capable of a top speed of 125 miles per hour (201 km/h) and acceleration of 0–50 mph (0–80 km/h) in 6 seconds, a significant achievement for a road car at the time. The fastest production car in 1953 was the Pegaso Z-102 Supercharged sports car at 155 miles per hour (249 km/h). Jet owners included the CEO of CBS Frank Stanton, and actors Mickey Rooney and Lash La Rue.

The labor and materials required to produce the Jet resulted in a high price for the end product and, in 1954, after selling about 200 cars and losing about $1,000 ($12,000 in 2025) on each, Muntz closed the company. Today, Muntz Jets are prized collector cars and are recognized as predecessors to the Chevrolet Corvette and Ford Thunderbird.

=== Muntz TV ===
Muntz started plans to sell television receivers in 1946, and sales began in 1947. Muntz played the madman in his unorthodox television commercials, but in fact he was a shrewd businessman and a self-taught electrical engineer. By trial and error, taking apart and studying Philco, RCA, and DuMont televisions, he figured out how to reduce the devices' electrical components to their minimum functional number. This practice became known as "Muntzing".

In the 1940s and 1950s, most brands of television receivers were complicated pieces of equipment, commonly containing about 30 vacuum tubes, as well as rheostats, transformers, and other heavy components. As a result, they were usually very expensive: the cheapest U.S.-manufactured receiver made before World War II used a 3-inch (8 cm) screen and cost $125 ($2,893 in 2025); the cheapest model with a 12-inch (30 cm) screen cost $445 ($10,300 in 2025). By 1954, although broadcast television in the United States had existed in various forms since 1928, only 55 percent of U.S. households owned a receiver. By contrast, eight years later, 90 percent of U.S. households had one.

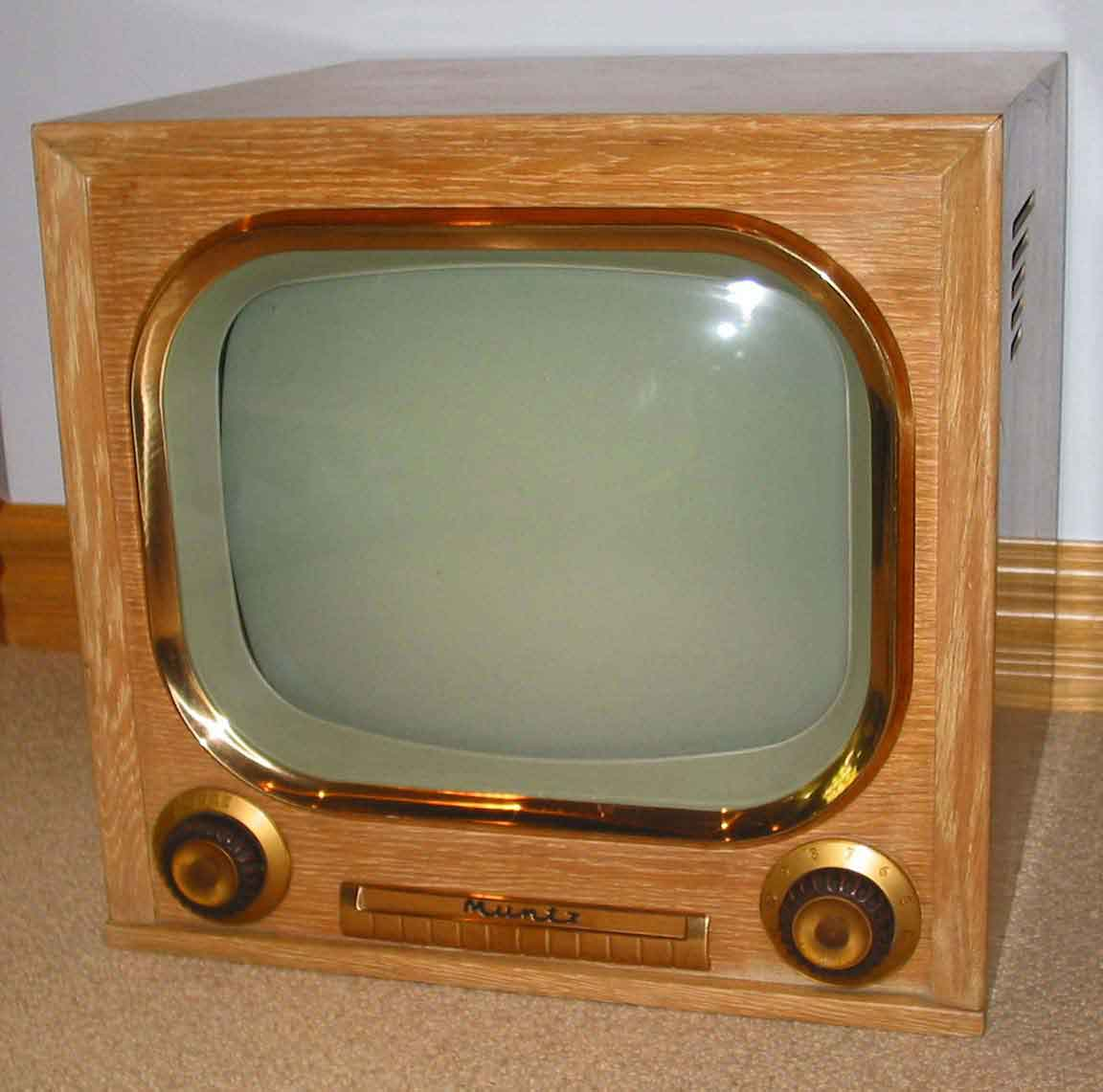
A 1951 Muntz TV model 17A3A

Muntz developed a television chassis that produced an acceptable monochrome picture with 17 tubes. He often carried a pair of wire clippers, and when he thought that one of his employees was "overengineering" a circuit, he would begin snipping components out until the picture or sound stopped working. At that point, he would tell the engineer "Well, I guess you have to put that last part back in" and walk away.

Marketed under the name "Muntz" by his company Muntz TV, Inc., the simplified units were the first black and white TV receivers to retail in the U.S. for less than $100. Muntz was also the first retailer to measure his screens from corner to corner rather than by width. The receivers sold well and were reliable partly because fewer tubes created less heat. The sets worked well in metropolitan areas that were close to television transmission towers where signals were strong. They worked poorly with weaker signals, as most of the components that Muntz had removed were intended to boost performance in fringe areas. This was a calculated decision: Muntz preferred to leave the low-volume, high-performance television receiver market to firms such as RCA and Zenith Electronics, as his intended customers were primarily urban dwellers with limited funds. Additionally, many urban apartment buildings had rules prohibiting external television antennas, and installation of an antenna, even if allowed, cost as much as $150. Muntz solved this problem by adding a built-in antenna to his receivers. In 1952, Muntz TV Inc. grossed $49.9 million ($605 million in 2025).

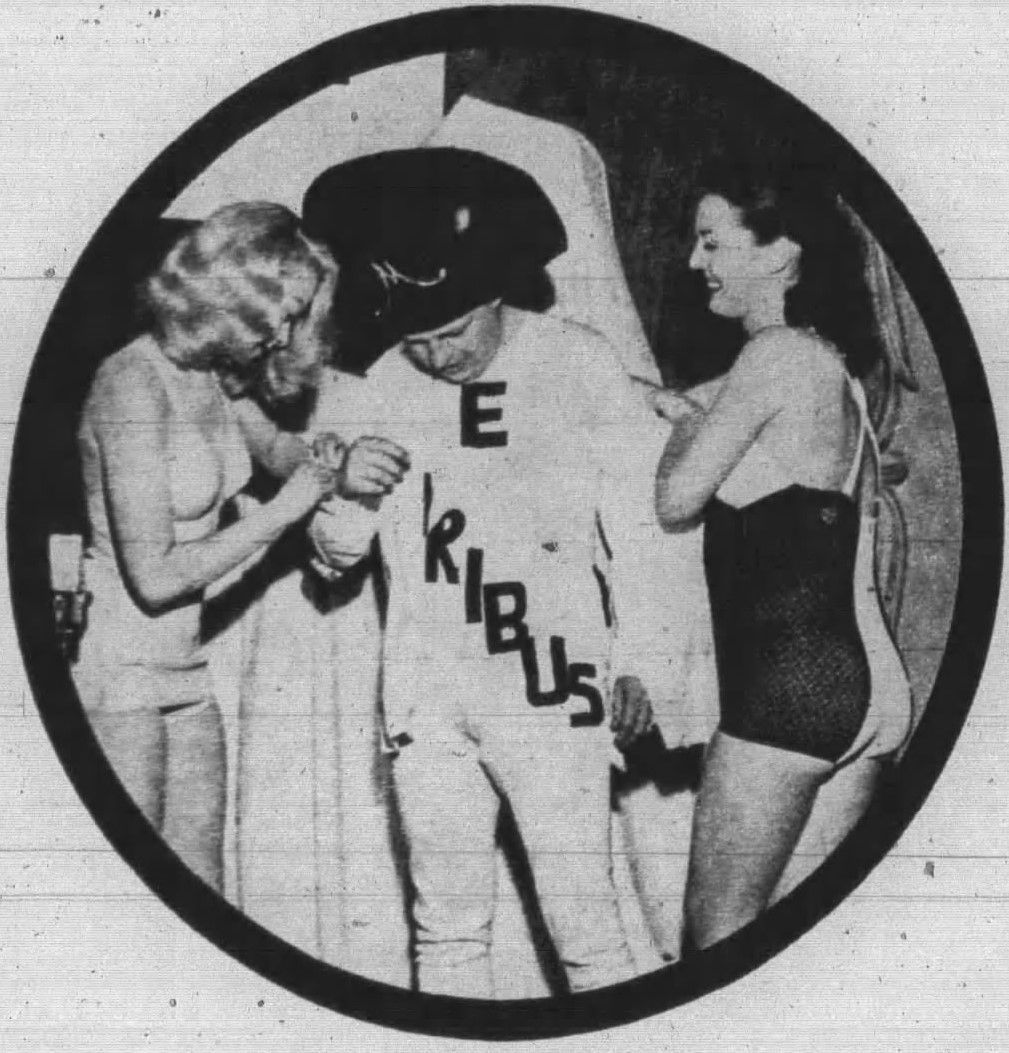
'Madman' Muntz, in 1969, with his trademark 'Napoleon hat', wearing a suit emblazoned with "E Pluribus Muntz"

Muntz continued with his "Madman" persona in many of his advertisements. In one TV commercial that normally aired after The Ed Sullivan Show, Muntz, dressed in red long johns and a Napoleon hat, promoted his new 14-inch (36 cm) televisions by saying, "I wanna give 'em away, but Mrs. Muntz won't let me. She's crazy!" Another TV commercial presented a marching-band song with lyrics about Muntz TVs and incorporated animations by Oskar Fischinger. His radio commercials, which Muntz ran up to 170 times a day, initially followed a classical music theme built around the spelling of Muntz's name. However, he soon convinced radio stations to run ads more in line with his persona. In one spot, Muntz screamed "Stop staring at your radio!" He followed up his radio ads with a direct mail campaign, collecting thousands of TV knobs and mailing them to prospective customers with a note saying, "Call us and we'll show up with the rest of the set!"

Some sources credit Muntz with inventing the abbreviation "TV". Muntz used skywriting as one of his marketing tactics, but, after watching one of his ads being created, he noted that the letters began to blur and dissipate before the pilot could finish spelling out "Muntz Televisions". So Muntz came up with the abbreviation "TV". However, "TV" had earlier been used in the call letters of television stations, such as WCBS-TV, which adopted those call letters in 1946. Muntz also named his daughter "Tee Vee", although she normally went by "Teena" and, later, "Tee".

== Audio and video: 1954–1985 ==
Despite his early success, sales later declined and Muntz's creditors refused to provide further financing in 1954. Muntz admitted his business lost $1,457,000 from April to August 1953, and although he tried to reorganize, Muntz TV filed bankruptcy and went out of business in 1959. (The company would be reorganized and last through the 1960s, but without its namesake at the helm.) However, Muntz's success continued in the sales of cars and general consumer electronics.

=== 4-track cartridge ===
Attempting to combine his two main product lines, cars and stereos, Muntz invented the Muntz Stereo-Pak 4-track tape cartridge. 4-track was the direct predecessor of the Stereo 8 cartridge, also known as the 8-track, later developed by American inventor Bill Lear. The Stereo-Pak cartridge was based on the endless-loop Fidelipac cartridge, which was being used by radio stations, designed by inventor George Eash. Muntz chose stereo recording as a standard feature because of its wide availability. Before Muntz developed the Stereo-Pak, the only in-car units capable of recorded playback were phonograph-based players, such as the Highway Hi-Fi invented by Peter Goldmark. These units played special 16 2/3 rpm records or 45 rpm records, however they tended to skip whenever the vehicle hit a bump in the road, and attempts to alleviate this by increasing the pressure on the arm caused discs to wear out prematurely.

Muntz designed a stereo tape player called the Autostereo for cars and had it inexpensively manufactured in Japan. The Autostereo could play a complete album without changing tracks or turning the tape over, did not suffer from skipping or premature wear as the phonograph-based players did, and its number of knobs and controls was minimized to allow the driver to concentrate on the road. The tape player gave customers greater control over their listening experiences, because the tapes never ran advertisements or public service announcements, unlike radio broadcasts. Muntz sold the players and cartridges from his own stores and through franchises in Florida and Texas.

Muntz audio products were so profitable by 1962 that he cancelled his agreements with tape-duplicating companies and founded his own company to manufacture prerecorded Stereo-Pak cartridges. Most record companies did not manufacture Stereo-Pak cartridges themselves; however, the Muntz Electronics Corporation licensed music from all the major record labels and issued hundreds of different tapes in the mid to late 1960s. Muntz exhibited his Autostereo players and Stereo-Pak cartridges under the trade name Stereo-Pak at the 1967 Consumer Electronics Show.

Muntz Stereo-Pak ads tended to feature attractive young models and suggestive tag lines.

The Autostereo player, which retailed from $129 in 1963 ($1,360 in 2025) was a popular aftermarket addition to cars among the Beverly Hills rich and famous. Frank Sinatra used one in his Buick Riviera, Dean Martin in his Corvette, and Peter Lawford in his Ghia. James Garner, Red Skelton, and Lawrence Welk also used Autostereo players in their cars. Barry Goldwater purchased one for his son, and Jerry Lewis recorded his scripts onto Stereo-Pak cartridges to learn his lines while driving.

Muntz attempted to establish a modern, trendy image for his players and cartridges. His print advertisements often showed the player installed in an appealing sports car and usually incorporated a young, attractive model with a suggestive tagline. Most of his employees in his California shops were attractive young women dressed in overbright clothing.

Bill Lear distributed the Stereo-Pak in 1963, intending to install units in his Learjet aircraft. However, he soon decided to re-engineer and customize the units to suit his own wishes, the result of which became the Stereo 8 system. The market for Muntz's 4-track system had faded by 1970 due to competition from Stereo 8, which reduced costs by using less magnetic tape and a less-complex cartridge mechanism. Although the 4-track system had wider heads resulting in better bandwidth, the Stereo 8 quickly became the dominant format for car stereo systems during the late 1960s. Ford Motor Company began featuring Stereo 8 players in their 1965 automobiles, and it became a standard option by 1966.

In a 1979 interview in The Videophile, Muntz revealed the biggest problem for the Stereo-Pak business was returned merchandise. He explained that when reproducing the work of major artists like The Beatles, the Stereo-Pak plant had to make hundreds of thousands of cartridges. But once a popular album became less popular, retailers would return the unsold cartridges, expecting credit towards new titles. Muntz was unprepared for the returns and said the huge cost of unsold merchandise eventually made his Stereo-Pak business unprofitable.

=== Home video ===
In late 1970, Muntz closed his Stereo-Pak audio business after a fire severely damaged his main offices. He then entered the growing home-video market. During the mid-1970s, Muntz thought of taking a 15-inch (38 cm) Sony color cathode-ray tube (CRT) television receiver, fitting it with a special lens and reflecting mirror, then projecting the magnified image onto a larger screen. He housed these primitive units in a large wooden console, making it one of the first successful widescreen projection TV receivers marketed for home use.

The receivers were built in Muntz's headquarters in Van Nuys, California. Sony's U.S. sales division was unaware that Muntz was dealing directly with Sony's Tokyo original equipment manufacturer (OEM) department, which shipped him the TV chassis directly. Thanks to Muntz's talent for mass-market advertising and self-promotion, by 1977 the projection receivers were a multimillion-dollar business. Muntz was quick to feature Sony's Betamax as well as JVC's and RCA's VHS recorders in his store, setting up a showroom to demonstrate the potential for a "theater experience in the home".

In 1979, Muntz decided to sell blank tapes and VCRs as loss leaders to attract customers to his showroom, where he would then try to sell them his projection TV systems. His success continued through the early 1980s until he invested heavily in the Technicolor Compact Video Cassette (CVC), a 1/4 in (6 mm) system designed to compete with Betamax, VHS, and the Super 8 film home-movie system. The CVC format failed in the marketplace, sales quickly eroded, and Muntz's store closed soon after.

== Later years ==
Shortly before dying of lung cancer in 1987, Muntz centered his retail business on cellular phones, satellite dishes, a motorhome rental company dubbed "Muntz Motor Mansions", and prefabricated aluminum houses. He made headlines in February 1985 as the first retailer to offer a Hitachi cellular phone for less than $1,000 ($3,000 in 2025), when just two years earlier most cellular phones had cost about $3,000 ($9,700 in 2025). At the time of his death, he was the leading retailer of cellular phones in Los Angeles. During his final years, Muntz drove a customized Lincoln Continental with a television installed in the dashboard: Muntz claimed it helped him "drive better".

After he died, his children, James and Tee, continued to operate two Muntz stores in Van Nuys and Newhall; the remainder of the stores were franchised businesses. James employed his father's advertising techniques to create splashy ads featuring prices that annoyed his competitors so much that they referred to them as "cutthroat".

== Legacy ==
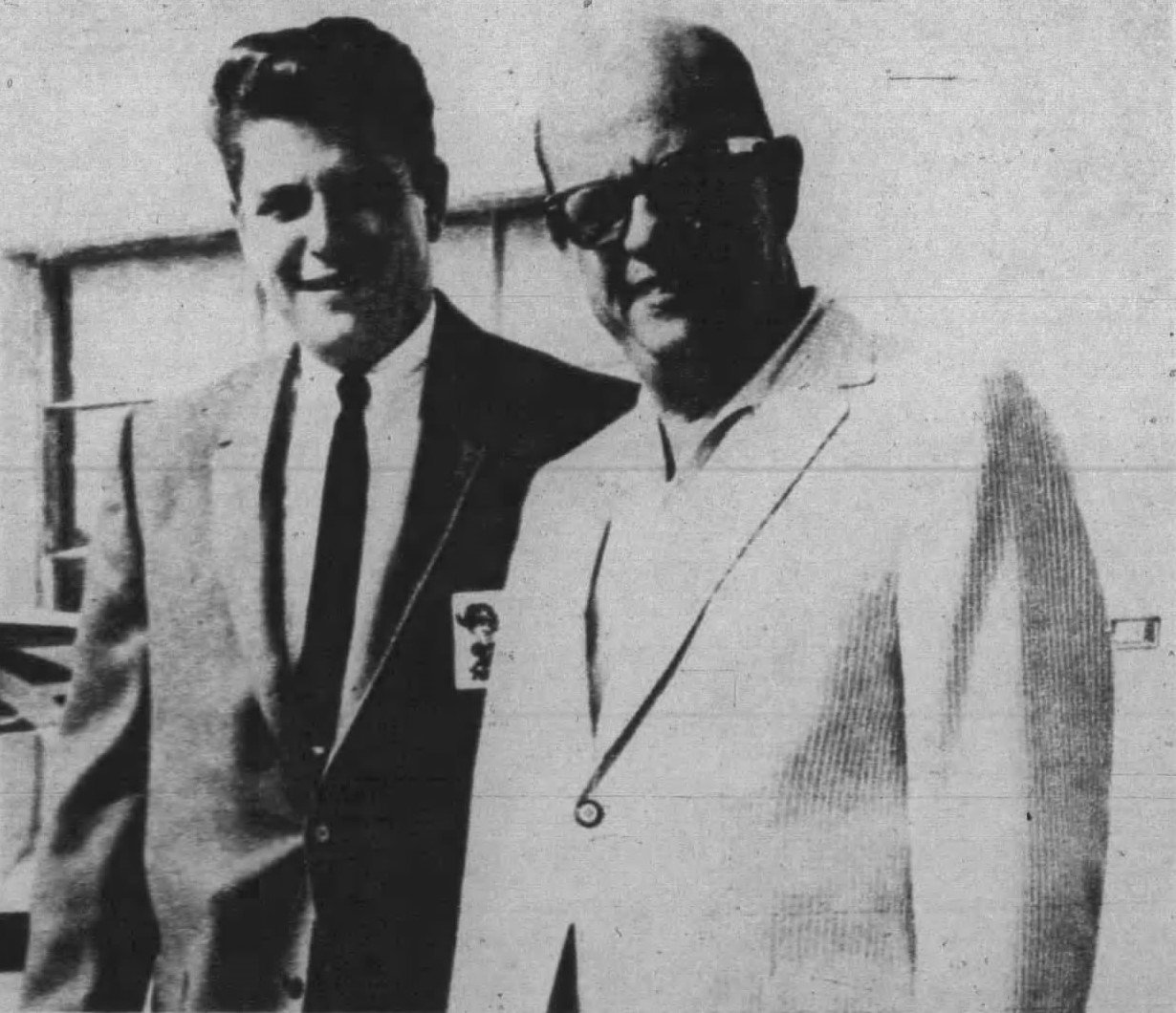
Muntz with his son Jim Muntz, in 1969

The "Madman" method pioneered by Muntz was later copied by other retailers, including California car salesman Cal Worthington and New York area electronics chain Crazy Eddie. In Crazy Eddie TV commercials, radio personality Jerry Carroll leapt at the camera and jumped around while jabbering at high speed, always ending with the line, "Crazy Eddie: Our prices are insaaaaaane!" As a result of his Crazy Eddie commercials, Carroll became a significant 80s icon, even appearing in the film Splash.

Muntz's cultural impact was such that he was mentioned in novels, including children's book The Neddiad: How Neddie Took The Train, Went To Hollywood, And Saved Civilization by Daniel Manus Pinkwater, The Lost Get-Back Boogie by James Lee Burke, and Franklin Mason's Four Roses in Three Acts.

A production called Madman Muntz: American Maverick was screened at film festivals through 2007. Directed by Dan Bunker and Judy ver Mehr, it was produced by Jim Castoro, an owner of an original Muntz Jet. The film was an official 2005 selection at the San Fernando Valley International Film Festival and the Ole Muddy Film Festival. The film documents Muntz's life, paying particular attention to his colorful career, and includes interviews with people who knew him and home movie footage contributed by his children.

The KCET 1997 documentary More Things That Aren't Here Anymore has a segment on Muntz and is broadcast by the station regularly during pledge periods.

In 2001, Madman Muntz was posthumously inducted into the Consumer Electronics Hall of Fame.

== See also ==
- Jacque Fresco
