= Frank Kurtis =

American racing car designer

Frank Peter Kurtis (born Kuretich; January 25, 1908 – February 17, 1987) was an American racing car designer. He designed and built midget cars, quarter-midgets, sports cars, sprint cars, Indy cars, and Formula One cars. He was the founder of Kurtis Kraft.

== Career ==
Kurtis was born in Crested Butte, Colorado. He began working with fabrication when he was hired by Willet Brown and Tom Lee to rework Don Lee Racing Team's midget car bodies.

Kurtis started Kurtis Kraft when he built his own midget car chassis in the late 1930s. In 1941, Kurtis designed a car named The Californian for Joel Thorne. Glenn Gordon "Gary" Davis (d. 1973) saw this car, and used the design for his Davis D-2 Divan, a 3-wheeled design of which only 13 were produced.

Kurtis built some very low glass-fibre bodied two-seaters sports cars under his own name in Glendale, California between 1949 and 1955. Ford (US) running gear was used. About 17 Kurtis Sport Cars had been made when the licence was sold to Madman Muntz who built the Muntz Jet. In 1954 and 1955, road versions of his Indianapolis racers were offered.

Kurtis Kraft created over 550 ready-to-run midget cars, and 600 kits. The Kurtis Kraft chassis midget car featured a smaller version of the Offenhauser motor. The National Midget Auto Racing Hall of Fame describes the combination as "virtually unbeatable for over twenty years." Kurtis Kraft created 120 Indianapolis 500 cars, including five winners.

Kurtis sold his midget car business to Johnny Pawl in the late 1950s, and his quarter midget business to Ralph Potter in 1962. Kurtis died in February 1987.

== Origins ==
His father Frank (Franjo) Andrew Kuretić was born in Razdrto, Croatia. Franjo worked as a blacksmith in the nearby Brod Moravice. He followed his brother Mijo (Mihovil) to the United States in 1902, where he married Apolonija Mary (Apolonija) Kuretić, originally also from Razdrto, Croatia on April 22, 1907 in Utah.

== Awards ==
- He was inducted in the National Sprint Car Hall of Fame in 1994.
- He was inducted in the Motorsports Hall of Fame of America in 1999.
- He was the first non-driver to be inducted in the National Midget Auto Racing Hall of Fame at his 1986 induction.

== See also ==
- Joel Thorne
- Davis Motorcar Company
