= Kurtis Kraft =

American designer and builder of race cars

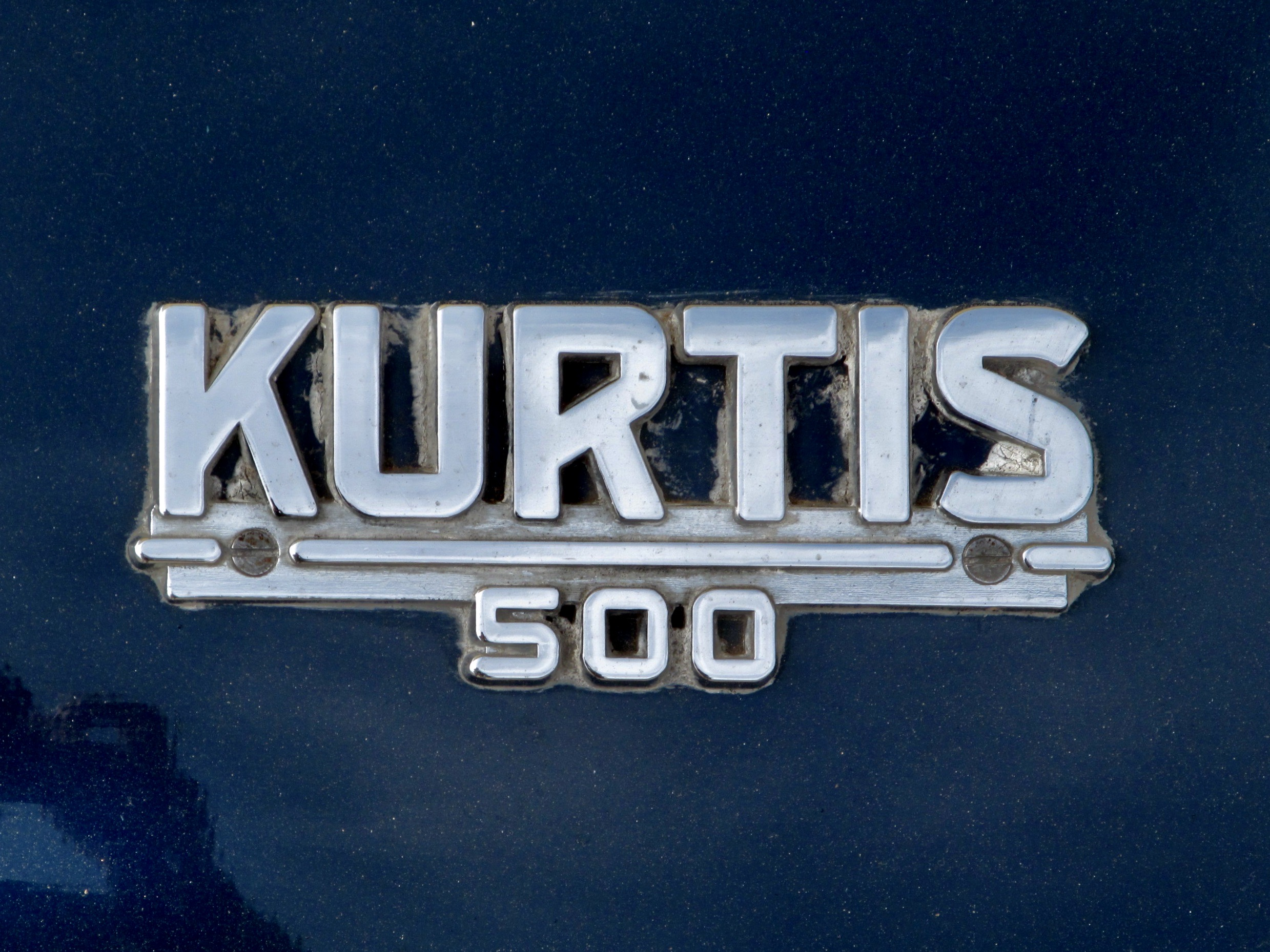
- Industry: Race car building
- Headquarters: Glendale, California, United States

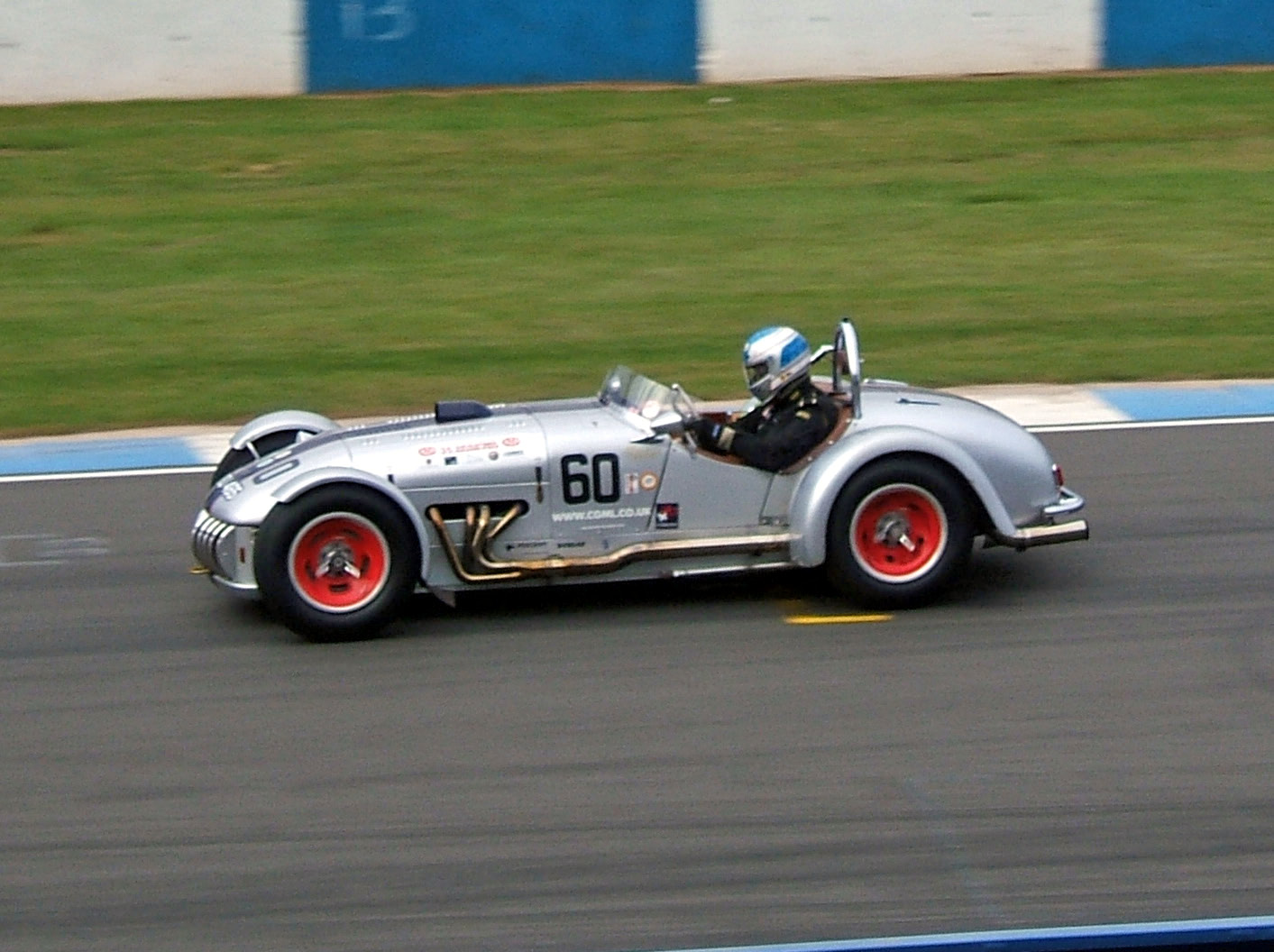
1955 Kurtis 500S

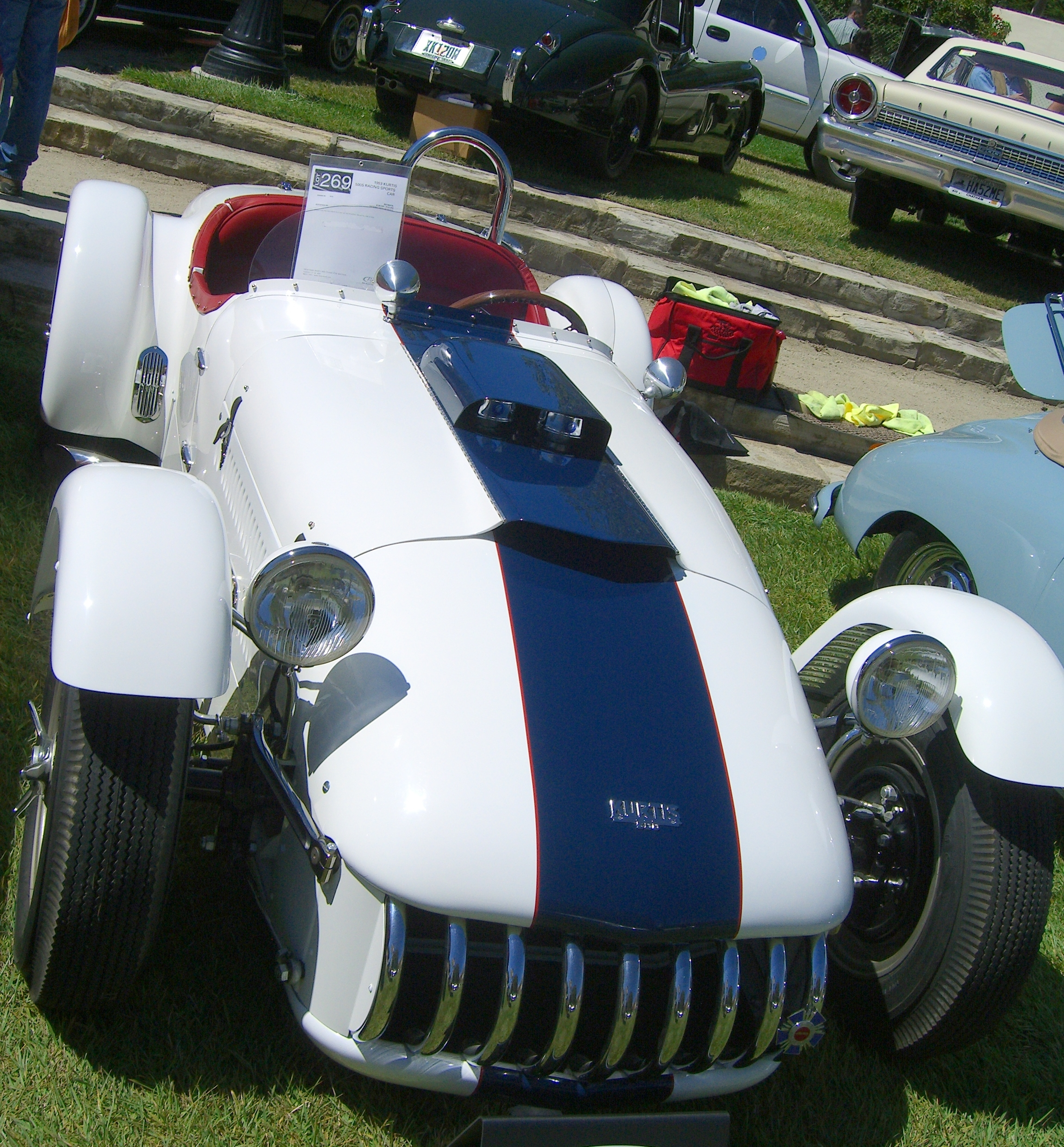
1953 Kurtis 500S, Chrysler-powered

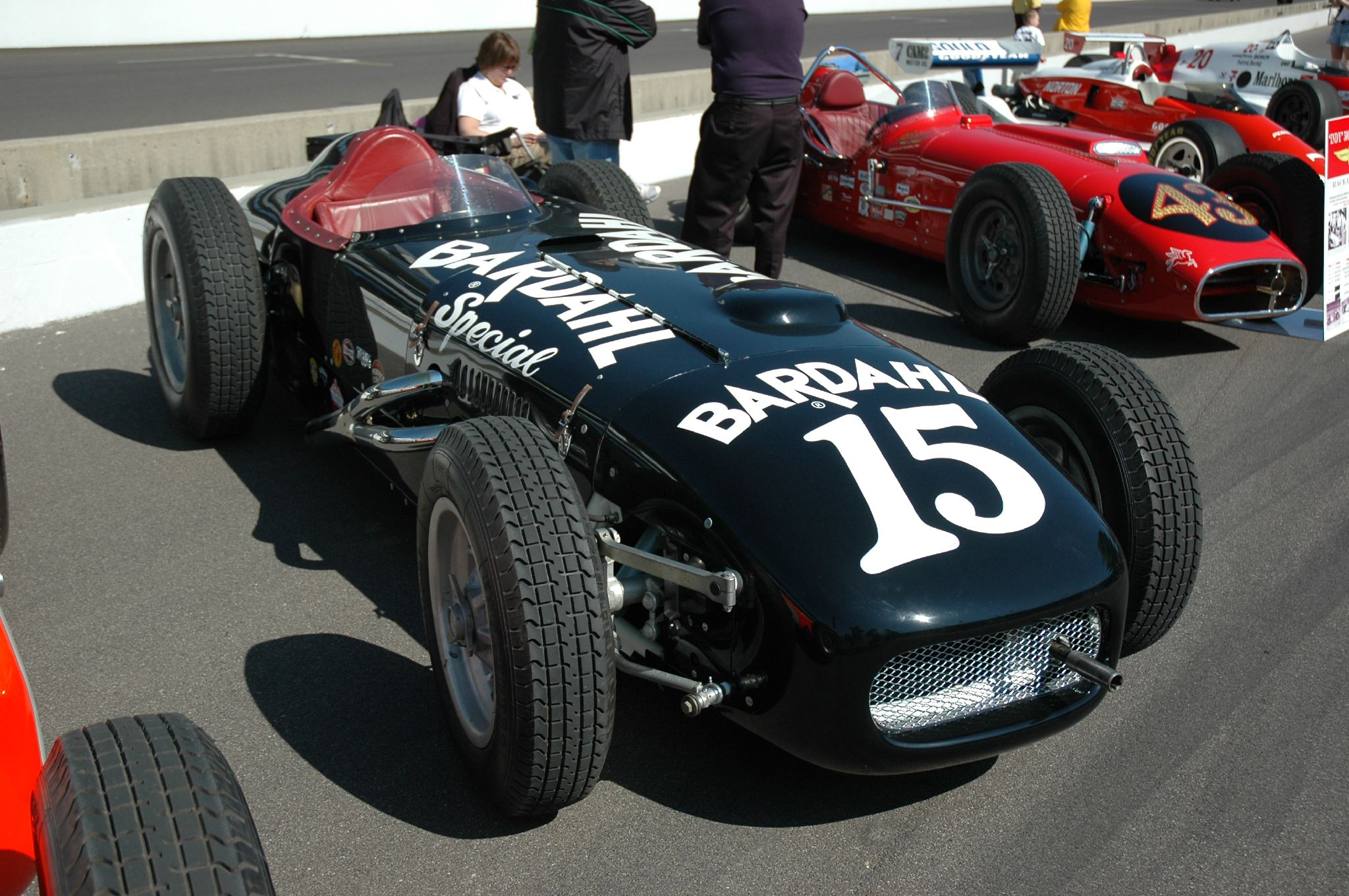
1955 Kurtis 500B Championship Car driven by Jimmy Davies to third place in the 1955 Indianapolis 500

Kurtis Kraft was an American designer and builder of race cars. The company built midget cars, quartermidgets, sports cars, sprint cars, Bonneville cars, and USAC Championship cars. It was founded by Frank Kurtis when he built his own midget car chassis in the late 1930s.

Kurtis built some very low fiberglass bodied two-seaters sports cars under his own name in Glendale, California between 1949 and 1955. Ford (US) running gear was used. About 36 Kurtis Sport Cars had been made when the licence was sold to Earl "Madman" Muntz who built the Muntz Jet. In 1954 and 1955, road versions of their Indianapolis racers were offered.

Kurtis Kraft created 387 midget cars, some ready to race and some without engines or otherwise incomplete. Parts for several dozen were sold also, possibly as "kits." The Kurtis Kraft chassis midget car featured a smaller version of the Offenhauser motor. The National Midget Auto Racing Hall of Fame describes the combination as "virtually unbeatable for over twenty years." Kurtis Kraft also created 120 Indianapolis 500 cars, including five winners.

Kurtis sold the midget car portion of the business to Johnny Pawl in the late 1950s, and the quarter midget business to Ralph Potter in 1962.

Frank Kurtis was the first non-driver inducted in the National Midget Auto Racing Hall of Fame (U.S.). Zeke Justice and Ed Justice of the Justice Brothers both worked at Kurtis-Kraft after World War II. Zeke Justice was the first employee at Kurtis-Kraft.

The FIA World Drivers' Championship included the Indianapolis 500 between 1950 and 1960, so many Kurtis Kraft cars are credited with competing in that championship. One Kurtis midget car was also entered in the 1959 Formula One United States Grand Prix driven by Rodger Ward. It was not designed for international-style road racing and with an undersized engine it circulated at the back of the field for 20 laps before retiring with clutch problems.
