= Meinen Jesum laß ich nicht, BWV 124 =

1725 chorale cantata by Johann Sebastian Bach

Meinen Jesum laß ich nicht
- BWV 124
- Chorale cantata by J. S. Bach
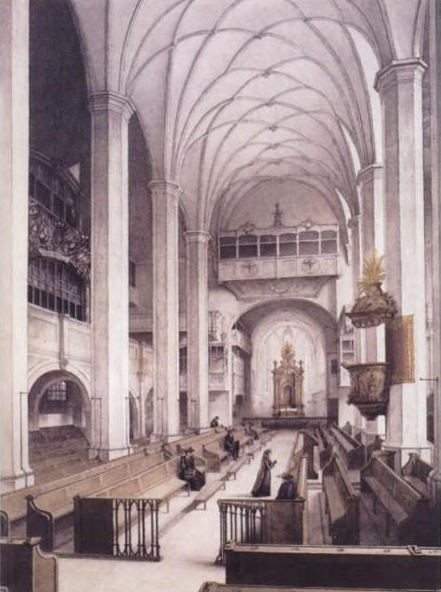
- Thomaskirche, Leipzig
- Occasion: First Sunday after Epiphany
- Chorale: "Meinen Jesum laß ich nicht" by Christian Keymann
- Performed: 7 January 1725: Leipzig
- Movements: 6
- Vocal: SATB choir and solo
- Instrumental: horn; oboe d'amore; 2 violins; viola; continuo

Meinen Jesum laß ich nicht (I will not let go of my Jesus), BWV 124, is a church cantata written by Johann Sebastian Bach. He composed it in Leipzig for the first Sunday after the Epiphany and first performed it on 7 January 1725. It is based on the hymn "Meinen Jesum laß ich nicht" by Christian Keymann.

The cantata is part of Bach's chorale cantata cycle, the second cycle during his tenure as Thomaskantor that began in 1723. In the style of the cycle, an unknown poet retained the outer stanzas for framing choral movements and paraphrased the inner stanzas into four movements for soloists, alternating recitatives and arias. Bach scored the work for four vocal soloists, a four-part choir and a Baroque instrumental ensemble of a horn to play the cantus firmus with the soprano, oboe d'amore, strings and basso continuo.

== History, hymn and words ==
Bach wrote the chorale cantata in his second year in Leipzig for the First Sunday after Epiphany. The prescribed readings for the Sunday were taken from the Epistle to the Romans, speaking of the duties of a Christian (Romans 12:1–6), and from the Gospel of Luke, the finding in the Temple (Luke 2:41–52).

A year earlier, Bach had reflected the same occasion in Mein liebster Jesus ist verloren, BWV 154, from the point of view of a person who had lost Jesus. The 1725 cantata text is based on the 1658 chorale in six stanzas by Christian Keymann. The text of the hymn begins, as in the former cantata, with an idea close to the Gospel: the Christian does not want to let go of Jesus, as his parents had wished not to lose their 12-year-old boy. The chorale then pursues the thought of being united with Jesus after death. In the format of the chorale cantata cycle, an unknown poet retained the hymn's first and last stanzas for choral movements, and paraphrased the inner stanzas to a sequence of as many recitatives and arias.

Bach led the Thomanerchor in the first performance of the cantata on 7 January 1725, one day after Liebster Immanuel, Herzog der Frommen, BWV 123, for Epiphany.

== Music ==
=== Structure and scoring ===
Bach structured Meinen Jesum laß ich nicht in six movements. Both the text and the tune of the hymn are retained in the outer movements, a chorale fantasia and a four-part closing chorale. Bach scored the work for four vocal soloists (soprano (S), alto (A), tenor (T) and bass (B)), a four-part choir, and a Baroque instrumental ensemble of a horn (Co) to reinforce the chorale melody, oboe d'amore (Oa), two violin parts (Vl), a viola part (Va), and basso continuo.

In the following table of the movements, the scoring, keys and time signatures are taken from Alfred Dürr's standard work Die Kantaten von Johann Sebastian Bach. The continuo, which plays throughout, is not shown. The duration is given as 17 minutes.

Movements of Meinen Jesum laß ich nicht
No.	Title	Type	Vocal	Winds	Strings	Key	Time
1	Meinen Jesum laß ich nicht	Chorale fantasia	SATB	Co Oa	2Vl Va	E major	3/4
2	Solange sich ein Tropfen Blut	Recitative	T				common time
3	Und wenn der harte Todesschlag	Aria	T	Oa	2Vl Va	F-sharp minor	3/4
4	Doch ach! welch schweres Ungemach	Recitative	B			A major	common time
5	Entziehe dich eilends, mein Herze, der Welt	Aria	S A			A major	3/8
6	Jesum laß ich nicht von mir	Chorale	SATB	Co Oa	2Vl Va	E major	common time

=== Movements ===
==== 1 ====
In the opening chorus, "Meinen Jesum laß ich nicht, weil er sich für mich gegeben" (I will not let go of my Jesus, since he has given himself for me), the soprano and the horn present line by line the cantus firmus, a melody by Andreas Hammerschmidt, who collaborated with Keymann on chorales. The lower voices are set mostly in homophony, while the orchestra plays its own themes in introduction, interludes and accompaniment. The character of the movement is a minuet, and the oboe d'amore takes a virtuosic concertante leading part. The phrase "klettenweis an ihm zu kleben" (cling to him like a burr) is illustrated by all three lower voices holding a note for three measures as if clinging to it. John Eliot Gardiner noted the "gentle, almost naïve tone of voice to reflect the submissive character of the text".

==== 2 ====
A short secco recitative expresses "Solange sich ein Tropfen Blut in Herz und Adern reget, soll Jesus nur allein mein Leben und mein alles sein" (As long as a drop of blood stirs in heart and vein, so shall Jesus alone be my life and my everything).

==== 3 ====
A tenor aria, "Und wenn der harte Todesschlage die Sinnen schwächt" (And when the harsh blow of death weakens my senses), is accompanied by an obbligato oboe d'amore, while the strings play "a persistent four-note drumming" to express "Furcht und Schrecken" (fear and terror) in the face of death. Dürr compared these repetitions to similar figures in the alto recitative "Warum wollt ihr erschrecken", movement 49 of Bach's Christmas Oratorio, Part V.

==== 4 ====
In another secco recitative, "Doch ach! Welch schweres Ungemach empfindet noch allhier die Seele?" (Yet alas! what heavy hardship does the soul still endure here?), the term "nach vollbrachtem Lauf" (after my completed course) is pictured by a scale spanning an octave.

==== 5 ====
A duet of soprano and alto, "Entziehe dich eilends, mein Herze, der Welt, du findest im Himmel dein wahres Vergnügen" (Withdraw yourself hurriedly, my heart, from the world, you will find in heaven your true delight), is accompanied by the continuo. It moves like a dance in simple periods of four measures.

==== 6 ====
The cantata is closed by the final chorale stanza, "Jesum laß ich nicht von mir, geh ihm ewig an der Seiten" (I will not let go of my Jesus, I will walk beside him forever), in a four-part setting.

== Recordings ==
A list of recordings is provided on the Bach Cantatas website. Vocal groups with one voice per part (OVPP) and instrumental groups playing period instruments in historically informed performances are marked by green background.

Recordings of Meinen Jesum laß ich nicht
Title	Conductor / Choir / Orchestra	Soloists	Label	Year	Instr.
Die Bach Kantate Vol. 1	Karl Richter Münchener Bach-Chor Münchener Bach-Orchester	Lotte Schädle; Hertha Töpper; Ernst Haefliger; Theo Adam	Archiv Produktion	1967	
Die Bach Kantate Vol. 21	Helmuth Rilling Gächinger Kantorei Bach-Collegium Stuttgart	Arleen Auger; Helen Watts; Aldo Baldin; Wolfgang Schöne	Hänssler	1980	
J. S. Bach: Das Kantatenwerk – Sacred Cantatas Vol. 7	Nikolaus Harnoncourt Tölzer Knabenchor Concentus Musicus Wien	soloists from Tölzer Knabenchor; Kurt Equiluz; Thomas Thomaschke	Teldec	1980	Period
Bach Edition Vol. 20 – Cantatas Vol. 11	Pieter Jan Leusink Holland Boys Choir Netherlands Bach Collegium	Ruth Holton; Sytse Buwalda; Knut Schoch; Bas Ramselaar	Brilliant Classics	1999	Period
Bach Cantatas Vol. 18: Berlin / Weimar / Leipzig / Hamburg	John Eliot Gardiner Monteverdi Choir English Baroque Soloists	Claron McFadden; Michael Chance; James Gilchrist; Peter Harvey	Soli Deo Gloria	2000	Period
J. S. Bach: Complete Cantatas Vol. 12	Ton Koopman Amsterdam Baroque Orchestra & Choir	Lisa Larsson; Annette Markert; Christoph Prégardien; Klaus Mertens	Antoine Marchand	2000	Period
J. S. Bach: Cantatas Vol. 32	Masaaki Suzuki Bach Collegium Japan	Yukari Nonoshita; Robin Blaze; Andreas Weller; Peter Kooy	BIS	2005	Period
