= Christian Keymann =

German hymnwriter (1607–1662)

- Born: February 27, 1607; Pankratz, Habsburg Bohemia
- Died: January 13, 1662 (aged 54); Zittau, Germany
- Other name: Christian Keimann
- Education: University of Wittenberg
- Occupation: Hymnwriter
- Known for: Writing chorales that served as base for some of Bach's works

Christian Keymann (also Christian Keimann; 27 February 1607 – 13 January 1662) was a German hymnwriter. He is known for writing the chorale "Meinen Jesum laß ich nicht" in 1658, which served as the base for Bach's chorale cantata Meinen Jesum laß ich nicht, BWV 124, and other compositions.

== Career ==
Keymann was born in Pankratz, Habsburg Bohemia, in 1607, the son of Zacharias Keimann, a Lutheran pastor. From 1627 to 1634, he studied at the University of Wittenberg. After graduation he worked at the gymnasium of Zittau, first as associate director, then as rector in 1638. He died of a stroke in 1662.

=== Hymns ===
Two of his most popular hymns were translated into English; "O rejoice, ye Christians, loudly" ("Freuet euch, ihr Christen alle") found in Chorale Book, No. 33, and "Jesus will I never leave" ("Meinen Jesum laß ich nicht") found in United Brethren's Hymn Book, No. 464. Donald G. Bloesch in his book The struggle of prayer (1980) describes it as a "moving hymn". His hymns in general have been described as "being of genuine poetic ring, fresh, strong, full of faith under manifold and heavy trials, and deeply spiritual".

=== Music ===
Keymann collaborated with composer Andreas Hammerschmidt who created tunes for Keymann's hymns. In 1646, a collection of hymns Mnemosyne sacra was published by Keymann in Leipzig, including five tunes by Hammerschmidt. In 1658, the collection Fest-, Buß- und Danklieder (Songs for feast, repentance and thanks) was printed in Zittau, containing the hymn "Meinen Jesum laß ich nicht" (I will not let go of my Jesus).

In 1725, Johann Sebastian Bach based his chorale cantata for the first Sunday after Epiphany on this entire hymn, but he also used single stanzas in other cantatas, from the same chorale in Wachet! betet! betet! wachet! BWV 70, Was Gott tut, das ist wohlgetan, BWV 98 and Mein liebster Jesus ist verloren, BWV 154. In the first (1727/1729) version of his St Matthew Passion, Part I was concluded with the final stanza of the chorale, "Jesum laß ich nicht von mir" (Jesus I'll not let leave me). He used a stanza from "Freuet euch, ihr Christen alle" (Be joyful, all ye Christians, 1646), also on a melody by Hammerschmidt, in Darzu ist erschienen der Sohn Gottes, BWV 40.

Max Reger based three compositions on "Meinen Jesum laß ich nicht", a chorale prelude (Op. 67 No.26, 1902), a composition for soprano, mixed choir, violin, viola and Organ (1905), and again a chorale prelude (Op. 135a No. 17, 1914). Sigfrid Karg-Elert wrote a chorale improvisation for organ (Fughetta), Op. 65 No 49.

== Sources ==
- Christian Weise: Memoria Christiani Keimani. Zittau 1689
- Heinrich Julius Kämmel: Christian Keimann Programm Zittau 1856
- Theodor Gärtner (ed.): Quellenbuch zur Geschichte des Gymnasiums in Zittau. vol. 1, Leipzig 1905, p. 88-90
- Walther Killy (ed.): Literaturlexikon. Autoren und Werke deutscher Sprache (15 volumes). Gütersloh, Munich: Bertelsmann-Lexikon-Verlag, 1988–1991 (CD-ROM: Berlin 1998, ISBN 3-932544-13-7)
