= Wachet! betet! betet! wachet! BWV 70 =

Church cantatas by Johann Sebastian Bach

Wachet! betet! betet! wachet!
- BWV: 70a; 70
- Church cantata by J. S. Bach
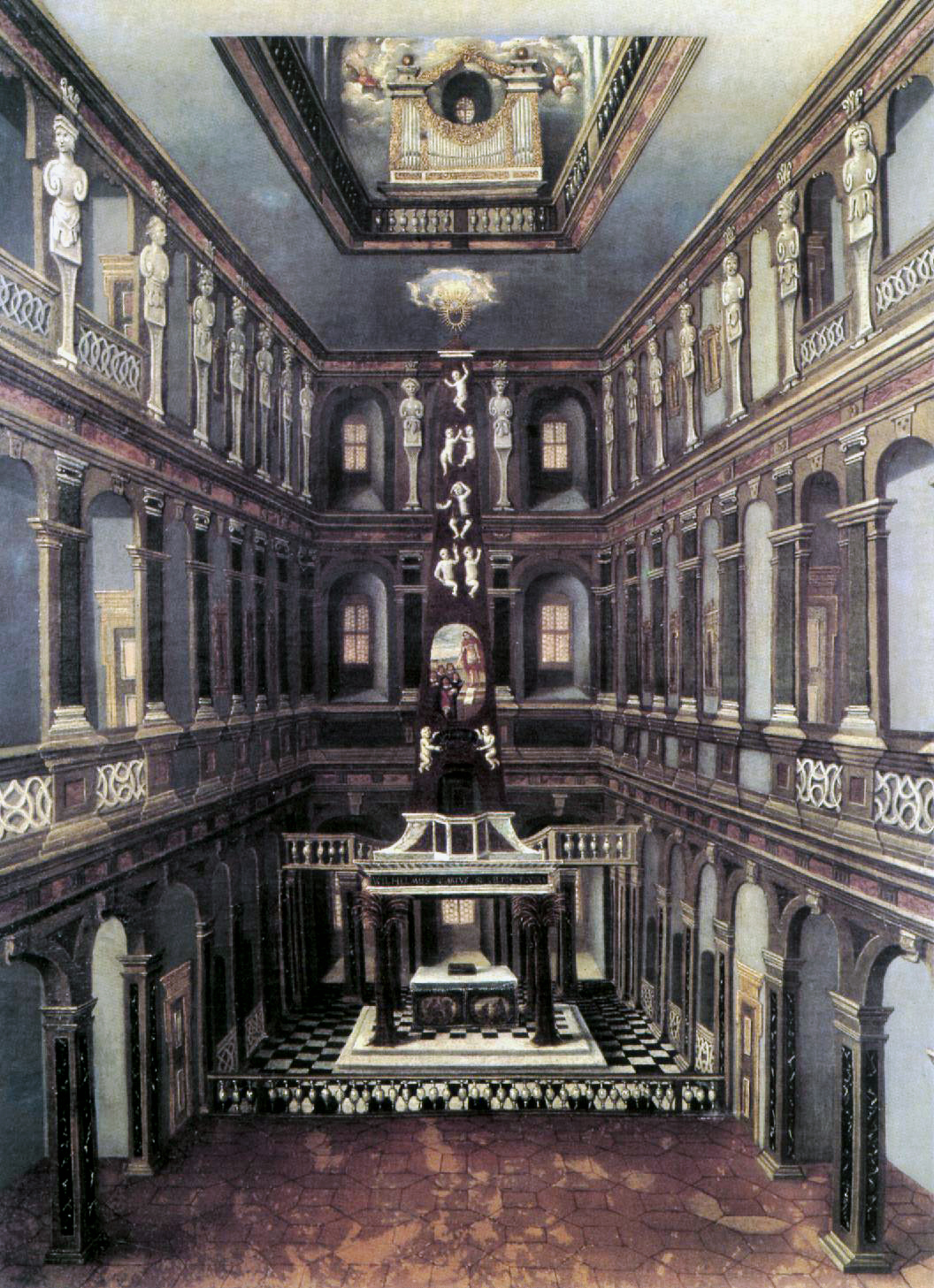
- The Schlosskirche in Weimar
- Occasion: Second Sunday in Advent (70a); 26th Sunday after Trinity (70)
- Cantata text: Salomon Franck
- Chorale: "Freu dich sehr, o meine Seele"; "Meinen Jesum laß ich nicht"
- Performed: 6 December 1716: Weimar; 21 November 1723: Leipzig
- Movements: 6; 11 in two parts
- Vocal: SATB choir and solo
- Instrumental: trumpet; oboe; bassoon; 2 violins; viola; continuo

Wachet! betet! betet! wachet! (Watch! Pray! Pray! Watch!) is a church cantata by Johann Sebastian Bach. He composed a now lost first version, BWV 70a, in Weimar for the second Sunday in Advent of 1716 and expanded it in 1723 in Leipzig to the surviving BWV 70, a cantata in two parts for the 26th Sunday after Trinity.

== History and words ==
On 2 March 1714 Bach was appointed concertmaster of the Weimar court capelle of the co-reigning dukes Wilhelm Ernst and Ernst August of Saxe-Weimar. As concertmaster, he assumed the principal responsibility for composing new works, specifically cantatas for the Schlosskirche (palace church), on a monthly schedule. Bach originally wrote this cantata in his last year there, for the Second Sunday of Advent.

The prescribed readings for the Sunday were from the Epistle to the Romans, call of the Gentiles (Romans 15:4–13), and from the Gospel of Luke, the Second Coming of Christ, also called Second Advent (Luke 21:25–36). The cantata text was provided by the court poet Salomon Franck, published in Evangelische Sonn- und Fest-Tages-Andachten in 1717. Bach wrote five movements, a chorus and four arias, and concluded with the fifth verse of the chorale "Meinen Jesum laß ich nicht" by Christian Keymann.

Bach first performed the cantata on 6 December 1716.

In Leipzig, Advent was a quiet time (tempus clausum), thus no cantata music was performed in services from Advent II to Advent IV. In order to use the music again, Bach had to dedicate it to a different liturgical event and chose the 26th Sunday after Trinity with a similar theme. The prescribed readings for this Sunday were from The Second Epistle of Peter, "look for new heavens and a new earth" (2 Peter 3:3–13), and from the Gospel of Matthew, the Second Coming of Christ, also called Second Advent (Matthew 25:31–46). An unknown poet kept the existing movements and added recitatives and a chorale to end part 1 of the new cantata, the final verse of "Freu dich sehr, o meine Seele" by Christoph Demantius.

Bach performed the extended cantata first on 21 November 1723, and a second time on 18 November 1731.

== Scoring and structure ==
The instrumentation of the Weimar cantata is lost. The cantata in two parts of 7 and 4 movements was scored in Leipzig for soprano, alto, tenor, and bass soloists, a four-part choir, trumpet, oboe, bassoon, two violins, viola, and basso continuo. The movement numbers of cantata 70a are given in brackets.

Part I

1. Chorus: Wachet! betet! betet! wachet! (1.)
2. Recitative (bass): Erschrecket, ihr verstockten Sünder
3. Aria (alto): 'Wenn kömmt der Tag, an dem wir ziehen (2.)
4. Recitative (tenor): Auch bei dem himmlischen Verlangen
5. Aria (soprano): Laßt der Spötter Zungen schmähen (3.)
6. Recitative (tenor): Jedoch bei dem unartigen Geschlechte
7. Chorale: Freu dich sehr, o meine Seele

Part II

8. Aria (tenor): Hebt euer Haupt empor (4.)
9. Recitative (bass): Ach, soll nicht dieser große Tag
10. Aria (bass): Seligster Erquickungstag (5.)
11. Chorale: Nicht nach Welt, nach Himmel nicht (6.)

== Music ==
Bach shaped the opening chorus in a da capo form and used a technique to embed the vocal parts in the concerto of the orchestra. A characteristic trumpet calls to wake up, initiating figurative movement in the other instruments and the voices. The choir contrasts short calls "Wachet!" and long chords "betet!".

All instruments accompany the recitative, illustrating the fright of the sinners, the calmness of the chosen ones, the destruction of the world, and the fear of the ones called to be judged.

Part I is closed by the final verse of "Freu dich sehr, o meine Seele" in a four-part setting.

The recitative in movement 9 opens with a Furioso depicting the "unerhörten letzten Schlag" (the unheard-of last stroke), while the trumpet quotes the hymn "Es ist gewisslich an der Zeit" (Indeed, the time is here). This chorale had been used as kind of a Dies irae during the Thirty Years' War. The recitative ends on a long melisma on the words "Wohlan, so ende ich mit Freuden meinen Lauf" (Therefore, I will end my course with joy). The following bass aria begins immediately, without the usual ritornello, molt' adagio. After this intimate reflection of the thought "Jesus führet mich zur Stille, an den Ort, da Lust die Fülle." (Jesus leads me to quiet, to the place where pleasure is complete) the closing chorale is set richly for seven parts, independent parts for the upper three strings forming a "halo" for the voices.

== Recordings ==
- J. S. Bach: Cantatas BWV 68 & BWV 70, Kurt Thomas, Kantorei der Dreikönigskirche, Frankfurt, Collegium Musicum, Ingeborg Reichelt, Sibylla Plate, Helmut Kretschmar, Erich Wenk, L'Oiseau-Lyre 1952?
- Cantata BWV 70, Karl Richter, Münchener Bach-Chor, Chamber orchestra of the Bayerisches Staatsorchester, Lotte Schädle, Hertha Töpper, Helmut Kretschmar, Kieth Engen, Andromeda 1957
- Les Grandes Cantates de J. S. Bach Vol. 23, Fritz Werner, Heinrich-Schütz-Chor Heilbronn, Württembergisches Kammerorchester Heilbronn, Hedy Graf, Barbara Scherler, Kurt Huber, Jakob Stämpfli, Erato 1970
- Die Bach Kantate Vol. 15, Helmuth Rilling, Gächinger Kantorei, Bach-Collegium Stuttgart, Arleen Augér, Verena Gohl, Lutz-Michael Harder, Siegmund Nimsgern, Hänssler 1970/1982
- J. S. Bach: Das Kantatenwerk – Sacred Cantatas Vol. 4, Nikolaus Harnoncourt, Tölzer Knabenchor, Concentus Musicus Wien, soloist of the Tölzer Knabenchor, Paul Esswood, Kurt Equiluz, Ruud van der Meer, Teldec 1977
- J. S. Bach: Complete Cantatas Vol. 9, Ton Koopman, Amsterdam Baroque Orchestra & Choir, Sibylla Rubens, Bernhard Landauer, Christoph Prégardien, Klaus Mertens, Antoine Marchand 1998
- J. S. Bach: Cantatas Vol. 15 – Cantatas from Leipzig 1723, Masaaki Suzuki, Bach Collegium Japan, Yukari Nonoshita, Robin Blaze, Gerd Türk, Peter Kooy, BIS 2000
- Bach Cantatas Vol. 13: Köln/Lüneburg, John Eliot Gardiner, Monteverdi Choir, English Baroque Soloists, Brigitte Geller, Michael Chance, Jan Kobow, Dietrich Henschel, Soli Deo Gloria 2000

== Sources ==
- Wachet! betet! betet! wachet! BWV 70: Scores at the International Music Score Library Project
- Wachet! Betet! Betet! Wachet! BWV 70a; BC (A 4) / Sacred cantata (2nd Sunday of Advent) Bach Digital
- Wachet! Betet! Betet! Wachet! BWV 70; BC A 165 / Sacred cantata (26th Sunday after Trinity) Bach Digital
- Cantata BWV 70a Wachet! betet! betet! wachet! history, scoring, sources for text and music, translations to various languages, discography, discussion, Bach Cantatas Website
- Cantata BWV 70 Wachet! betet! betet! wachet! history, scoring, sources for text and music, translations to various languages, discography, discussion, Bach Cantatas Website
- BWV 70 Wachet! betet! betet! wachet! English translation, University of Vermont
- BWV 70a Wachet! betet! betet! wachet! text, scoring, University of Alberta
- BWV 70 Wachet! betet! betet! wachet! text, scoring, University of Alberta
- Luke Dahn: BWV 70.7, BWV 70.11 bach-chorales.com
