= Johannes Pramsohler =

French-Italian violinist, conductor and record producer (born 1980)

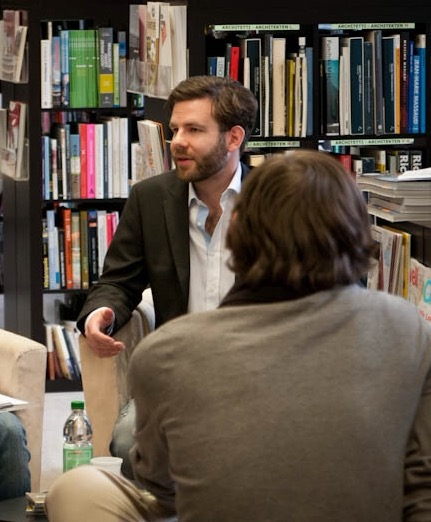
- Pramsohler at a signing session, April 2012
- Born: 5 April 1980 (age 46); Sterzing, South Tyrol, Italy
- Citizenship: Italian, French
- Occupations: Violinist conductor record producer
- Years active: 2005–present

Johannes Pramsohler is a French-Italian violinist, conductor and record producer, who specialises in historically informed performance.

== Biography ==
Johannes Pramsohler was born on 5 April 1980 in Sterzing in the autonomous Italian province of South Tyrol and studied at the Conservatorio Claudio Monteverdi in Bolzano, at the Paris Conservatoire CRR, at the Mozarteum Salzburg, at the Guildhall School of Music and Drama and at the Royal Academy of Music in London. His main teachers were Georg Egger, Jack Glickman, Rachel Podger and Reinhard Goebel. During his studies he played with period instrument orchestras such as Concerto Köln, the Orchestra of the Age of Enlightenment, Les Arts Florissants and the Academy of Ancient Music. He was a member of the 2007 European Union Baroque Orchestra.

Pramsohler has led orchestras such as The King's Consort, Le Concert d'Astrée, Concerto Köln, Arte dei Suonatori, the European Union Baroque Orchestra and the Helsinki Baroque Orchestra. 2014 saw his soloist debut with the Budapest Festival Orchestra. He regularly performs as a guest of the Berlin Philharmonic with their Early Music ensemble Concerto Melante.

Pramsohler is known for rediscovering works by neglected composers such as Giovanni Alberto Ristori, Johann Friedrich Meister, Jean-Joseph Cassanéa de Mondonville, Johann Georg Pisendel, Johann Friedrich Fasch and Johann Jakob Kress.

In 2019, Pramsohler, video artist Pierre Nouvel and set designer Damien Caille-Perret created a multimedia live performance of Johann Sebastian Bach's Musical Offering. In 2020, they launched a live show touring Europe. The performance features three giant rear-projected video screens with five musicians connected to the videos through click tracks using Apple iPad Pros and Soundbrenner Pulse technology. The show debuted at Toblach's Gustav-Mahler-Hall in Italy and also played at Rouen Opera House in France.

== Ensemble Diderot ==
In 2008 Pramsohler set up the Ensemble Diderot, a Paris-based ensemble specialising in chamber music from the 17th and 18th centuries. The group released its first album in 2014 on Audax Records and has released seven more recordings.

== Recordings ==
In March 2012 Pramsohler released his first solo recording "Pisendel – Violin concertos from Dresden" on the label Raumklang. It was nominated for an International Classical Music Award. In 2013 Pramsohler set up his own record label Audax Records. The first CD was released in October of the same year and was nominated for the Preis der deutschen Schallplattenkritik. The label has since produced 21 albums as well as a Baroque CD for children. In April 2018 the album French Sonatas on which Pramsohler plays with harpsichordist Philippe Grisvard was awarded a Diapason d'Or as well as the Preis der deutschen Schallplattenkritik. In August 2019 the album Sonatas for two violins won the Preis der deutschen Schallplattenkritik. In September 2019 The Paris Album was awarded a Diapason d'Or.

== Discography ==
- 2012 Pisendel - Violin concertos from Dresden (International Baroque Players)
- 2013 Johannes Pramsohler (with Philippe Grisvard, harpsichord)
- 2014 The Dresden Album (Ensemble Diderot)
- 2015 Bach & Entourage (with Philippe Grisvard, harpsichord)
- 2015 Montanari - Violin concertos (Ensemble Diderot)
- 2016 Meister - Il giardino del piacere (Ensemble Diderot)
- 2016 Mondonville - Trio sonatas op. 2 (Ensemble Diderot)
- 2017 Ristori - Cantatas (Ensemble Diderot, María Savastano)
- 2017 Bach & Weiss (with Jadran Duncumb, baroque lute)
- 2018 French Sonatas for Harpsichord and Violin (with Philippe Grisvard, harpsichord)
- 2018 German Cantatas with Solo Violin (with Nahuel di Pierro (bass), Andrea Hill (mezzo-soprano), Jorge Navarro Colorado (tenor), Christopher Purves (bass), Ensemble Diderot)
- 2018 Violin concertos from Darmstadt (with Darmstadt Baroque Soloists)
- 2019 Sonatas for two violins (with Roldán Bernabé)
- 2019 The Paris Album (Ensemble Diderot)
- 2019 The London Album (Ensemble Diderot)
- 2019 Echoes of the Grand Canal (Ensemble Diderot)
- 2020 Hellendaal 'Cambridge' Sonatas (with Philippe Grisvard, harpsichord, and Gulrim Choï, cello)
- 2020 Leclair - Trio sonatas op. 4 (Ensemble Diderot)
- 2021 Sonatas for three violins (Ensemble Diderot)
- 2021 The beginning of the violin concerto in France Leclair (World premiere), Corrette, Aubert, Exaudet (World premiere), Quentin (Ensemble Diderot)
