= Chorale setting =

Types of musical settings for chorales

Cantata Wachet auf, ruft uns die Stimme, BWV 140 by J. S. Bach
4. Chorale "Zion hört die Wächter singen"

Chorale settings refer to a wide variety of musical compositions, almost entirely of Protestant origin, which use a chorale as their basis. A chorale is a simple melody, often based on Gregorian chant, written for congregations to sing hymns. Chorale settings can be vocal, instrumental, or both.

Although the bulk of them are German in origin, and predominantly baroque in style, chorale settings span many countries and musical periods. At their simplest and most common, chorale settings are plain chordal harmonisations with little or no localised ornamentation—typically one chord for each note of the chorale, although quicker passing and neighbour notes are almost never harmonised with a separate chord.

The Protestant Reformation resulted in a significant change in musical practice in northern Europe. Plainchant, associated with the Catholic Church, was largely replaced with choral music sung in the vernacular language—usually German—and the corresponding musical forms from Catholic countries, such as the motet, were replaced with forms that used as their basis the chorales instead of the plainsong from which much of the motet repertory was derived.

Not only the musical forms, but the individual tunes of the Catholic Church were replaced by reformers, although there was often a close relation between the original and the replacement. Composers, including Martin Luther himself, both composed new tunes for the German chorale texts and adapted specific plainchant melodies. These chorales were set musically in an extraordinary number of ways, from the time of the Protestant Reformation to the present day.

Chorale settings are of the following principal types:

- Chorale cantata
- Chorale canzona (usually called a chorale ricercare)
- Chorale concerto
- Chorale fantasia
- Chorale fugue
- Chorale mass
- Chorale monody
- Chorale motet
- Chorale partita (usually interchangeable with chorale variations)
- Chorale prelude
- Chorale ricercare
- Chorale variations (usually interchangeable with chorale partita)

Boundaries between different items on this list can be vague, especially in the early Baroque. Some of these forms are exclusively instrumental (such as the chorale prelude, chorale fugue, chorale fantasia, chorale partita or variations, and chorale ricercare/canzona) while the others are a cappella vocal (some chorale motets) or for voices and instruments (chorale cantata, chorale concerto, chorale mass, chorale monody, some chorale motets). Many of the instrumental forms are almost exclusively for organ, the single most important liturgical instrument in Protestant church music from the Reformation until recent times. These organ settings can be called 'organ chorales'.

Some of these forms continue to be used by composers up to the present day, particularly the chorale prelude and the chorale mass.
