= Willard Cantrell =

American racing driver (1914–1986)

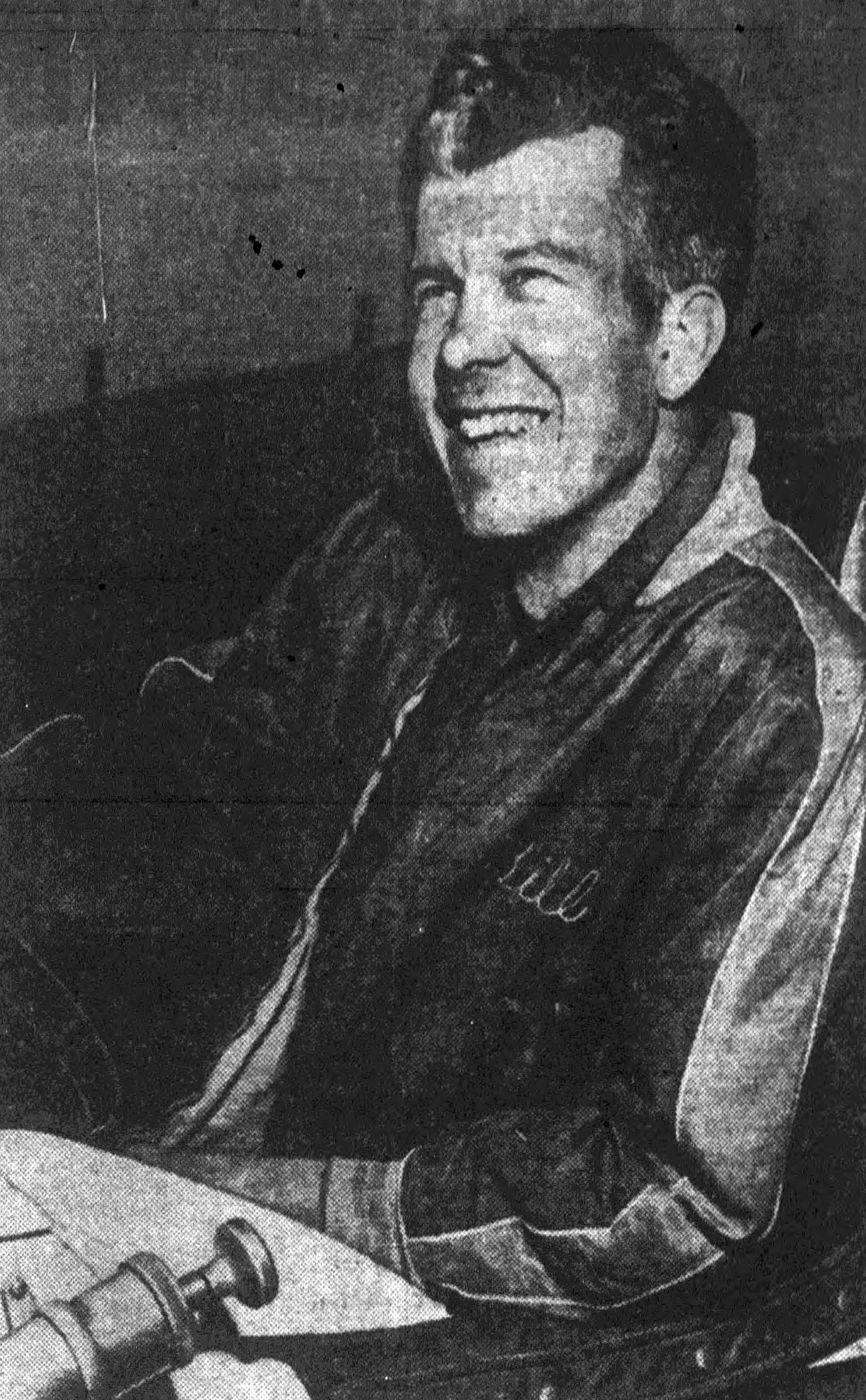
- Cantrell in 1951
- Born: December 6, 1914
- Died: February 6, 1986 (aged 71)

Formula One World Championship career
- Nationality: (United States) American
- Active years: 1953
- Team: Pankratz
- Entries: 1 (0 starts)
- Championships: 0
- Wins: 0
- Podiums: 0
- Career points: 0
- Pole positions: 0
- Fastest laps: 0
- First entry: 1953 Indianapolis 500
- Last entry: 1953 Indianapolis 500

Willard Leo "Bill" "Billy" Cantrell (December 6, 1914 – February 6, 1986) was a midget, sprint, and stock car racing driver from Anaheim, California. He was nicknamed the "Silver Fox" for his gray hair and sly tricks.

== Racing career ==
Cantrell started racing jalopies in 1936 in Southern California. He raced midgets with the United Midget Association (UMA) in 1939. He drove for over fifty midgets in 1940 and 1941 trying to find a winning car. He found that car in 1942, and he won 15 races in his second-place points finish in the UMA.

Cantrell won over 120 main events between 1945 and 1964 in United Racing Association, AAA, and USAC races. He won the 1962 Turkey Night Grand Prix. He won the 1947 URA Red Circuit Title in 1947 and series overall championship in 1951 and 1952. He won 18 sprint car races in the California Racing Association. In 1953, he made an unsuccessful attempt to qualify for the Indianapolis 500.

Cantrell made two NASCAR starts. He started the second and final NASCAR event held at Willow Springs Speedway in Lancaster, California in 1956 (the race counted for the 1957 season championship), and at Riverside International Raceway in 1965.

Cantrell became the West Coast supervisor for USAC, and he was a starter for the USRC midget club after he retired. He was inducted into the National Midget Auto Racing Hall of Fame.

== Complete Formula One World Championship results ==
(key)

Year	Entrant	Chassis	Engine	1	2	3	4	5	6	7	8	9	WDC	Points
1953	Emmett Malloy	Pankratz	Offenhauser L4	ARG	500; DNQ	NED	BEL	FRA	GBR	GER	SUI	ITA	NC	0
