= Daniel Croner =

Transylvanian theologian and organist (1656–1740)

Daniel Croner (1656–1740) was a Transylvanian composer and organist of Saxon descent. He is best known for his four manuscript collections of organ music, his 'Tabulaturae', that include some of the earliest surviving organ compositions from this region.

== Early life ==
Daniel Croner was born in Kronstadt (now Brașov) to master tailor Daniel Croner and his wife Katharina at their home in Purzengasse. His musical talent was recognized early and encouraged.

== Education ==
From 1671 to 1678 he attended Kronstadt's Honterus-Gymnasium. In 1675 he began to make copies of music for his own use. He then moved to Weissenburg (now Alba Iulia) to perfect his knowledge of Hungarian and moved to Breslau (now Wrocław) in 1680 to study at the Maria Magdalena High School.

Later that year Croner enrolled at the university in Leipzig. It seems he was unprepared for the cost of his studies in Leipzig and he transferred to Wittenberg to study theology. Here he got to know the local cantor Johann Ulich (1634–1712). When Corner left Wittenberg in 1683 Ulrich dedicated a printed “Musical Ode” to him.

== Adult life ==
In January 1684 Daniel Croner returned to Kronstadt and by the spring of 1685 he'd copied almost a hundred preludes and fugues into his - by now - four manuscript volumes of music, of which around twenty items are his own works.

In 1687 Croner married and in 1691 he was appointed 'preacher' at Kronstadt's St. John's Church. In 1693 he was appointed 'preacher' at the city parish church, known as the Schwarze Kirche" (Black Church).

In 1701, the community of nearby Heldsdorf (now Hălchiu) in Burzenland (now Țara Bârsei) elected him as their pastor. From 1704 he resumed adding to his manuscript music collection. In 1709 he oversaw the purchase of new organ for the Heldsdorf church. From 1735 to 1738 he was the Area Dean of the Burzenland churches. He died on April 25, 1740, in Heldsdorf and was buried in the church there.

== Works ==
Croner's magnum opus is his 'Tabulaturae', comprising four variously dated manuscript volumes of organ music - fugues, preludes, toccatas, fantasias and chorales - all written in tablature and preserved in the library of the Black Church.

- Kronstadt, 1675
- Breslau, 1681 (Tabulatura, Fugarum, Praeludiorum, Canzonarum, Tocatarum et Phanrasiarum.
- Wittenberg, May 1682 (Tabulatura Num: 12 Praeambulorum mit einem Capriccio von eben 12 Variationen; durch alle Claves und Tonos auff Clavichordien und Spinetten zu gebrauchen, gesetzt von Johann George Kittelen, Weitberiihmbten Churf. Hoff-Organisten in Dresden.
- Kronstadt, 1685

In his collection Croner not only displays his grasp of traditional styles - not least by including alongside his own compositions the works of older contemporaries such as Johann Froberger, Johann Erasmus Kindermann, Johann Christian Kittel, Bernhard Meyer and Johann Ulich - but also his own lively innovatory spirit. In these volumes Croner marks the transition from an earlier polyphonic style to the new styles of the High Baroque. Of particular note was his organisation of works into complete cycles of keys (such as we find later in J.S. Bach's Das Wohltemperirte Clavier). Other notable characteristics include: - rhythmic variations of choral themes; - the increased use of keys rather than church modes; - and the frequent introduction of the pedal. Croner was a pioneer in the inclusion of instructions for fingering methods on keyboard instruments and the finger extension principle for the execution of preludes and capriccios.
