= Mein liebster Jesus ist verloren, BWV 154 =

Church cantata by Johann Sebastian Bach

Mein liebster Jesus ist verloren
- BWV 154
- Church cantata by J. S. Bach
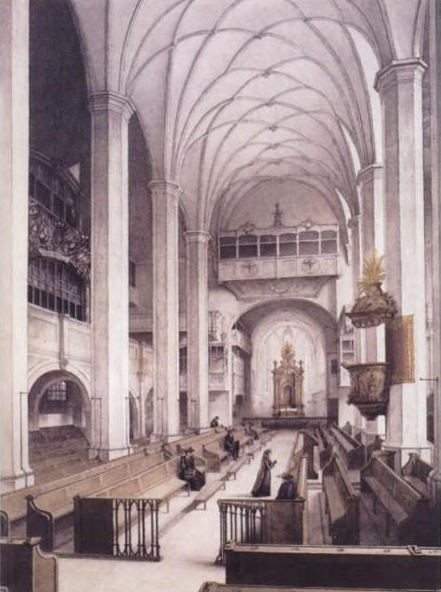
- Thomaskirche, Leipzig
- Occasion: First Sunday after Epiphany
- Bible text: Luke 2:49
- Chorale: by Martin Janus; "Meinen Jesum laß ich nicht"by Christian Keymann
- Performed: 9 January 1724: Leipzig
- Movements: 7
- Vocal: solo: alto, tenor and bass; SATB choir
- Instrumental: 2 oboes d'amore; 2 violins; viola; continuo

Mein liebster Jesus ist verloren (My dearest Jesus is lost), BWV 154, (Note: "BWV" is Bach-Werke-Verzeichnis, a thematic catalogue of Bach's works.) is a church cantata by Johann Sebastian Bach. He composed it for the first Sunday after Epiphany and first performed it in Leipzig on 9 January 1724.

== History and words ==
Bach performed the cantata in 1724, his first year in Leipzig on the First Sunday after Epiphany. The musicologist Alfred Dürr assumes that it was written already in Weimar, whereas John Eliot Gardiner shares this view only for movements 1, 4 and 7. The prescribed readings for the Sunday were taken from the Epistle to the Romans, speaking of the duties of a Christian (Romans 12:1–6), and from the Gospel of Luke, the finding in the Temple (Luke 2:41–52). The unknown poet takes the parents' search for the lost Jesus as the starting point to depict the general situation of man who lost Jesus. Movements 1 and 2 lament this loss. Movement 3 is a chorale, stanza 2 of "Jesu, meiner Seelen Wonne" by Martin Janus (or Jahn), asking Jesus to return. Movement 4 asks the same question in a personal aria. The answer is given by the bass, the vox Christi (voice of Christ), in the words of the Gospel "Wisset ihr nicht, daß ich sein muß in dem, das meines Vaters ist?" (Do you not know that I must be in that which is My Father's? Luke 2:49). The joy of the finding is expressed paraphrasing from the Song of Songs "The voice of my beloved! Behold, he comes, leaping on the mountains, skipping on the hills"(Song of Solomon 2:8). The cantata ends with stanza 6 of Christian Keymann's chorale "Meinen Jesum laß ich nicht".

Bach performed the cantata first year on 9 January 1724.

== Scoring and structure ==
Similar to the Weimar cantatas, the work is scored for alto, tenor and bass soloists, a four-part choir for the chorales only, two oboes d'amore, two violins, viola, and basso continuo. The cantata is structured in eighth movements.

1. Aria (tenor, strings): Mein liebster Jesus ist verloren
2. Recitative (tenor): Wo treff ich meinen Jesum an
3. Chorale: Jesu, mein Hort und Erretter
4. Aria (alto, oboi d'amore, strings, no continuo): Jesu, laß dich finden
5. Arioso (bass): Wisset ihr nicht, daß ich sein muß
6. Recitative (tenor): Dies ist die Stimme meines Freundes
7. Aria (alto, tenor, oboi d'amore, strings): Wohl mir, Jesus ist gefunden
8. Chorale: Meinen Jesum laß ich nicht

== Music ==
In the three arias Bach sets extreme affekts to music: desperate lament, intense longing and blissful joy. The first aria is based on an ostinato continuo, comparable to the opening of Weinen, Klagen, Sorgen, Zagen, BWV 12. First the violin, then the tenor perform an expressive melody and repeat it several times. The contrasting middle section is underlined by tremolos in the strings in daring harmonies. John Eliot Gardiner remarked in connection with his Bach Cantata Pilgrimage, that on the words "O Donnerwort in meinen Ohren" (O thunderous word in my ears), "it contains a graphic evocation of ear drumming". The second aria is accompanied by the two oboes d'amore and the violins and viola in unison, without continuo. Similar to the soprano aria Aus Liebe will mein Heiland sterben in Bach's St Matthew Passion, the lack of foundation portrays fragility and innocence. The joy of the finding is expressed in a duet of alto and tenor in homophonic vocal lines of parallel thirds and sixths. It is in three parts, the third not a da capo of the first, but an affirmative conclusion in a faster 3/8 time.

Movement 3 is a four-part setting of Johann Schop's tune of "Werde munter, mein Gemüte" (1642), which became famous as part of Herz und Mund und Tat und Leben, BWV 147, and was also used in movement 40 of the St. Matthew Passion. The closing chorale is a four-part setting of a 1658 tune by Andreas Hammerschmidt.

== Recordings ==
- Die Bach Kantate Vol. 21, Helmuth Rilling, Gächinger Kantorei, Bach-Collegium Stuttgart, Ann Murray, Aldo Baldin, Walter Heldwein, Hänssler 1978
- J. S. Bach: Das Kantatenwerk – Sacred Cantatas Vol. 8, Nikolaus Harnoncourt, Tölzer Knabenchor, Concentus Musicus Wien, Paul Esswood, Kurt Equiluz, Thomas Hampson, Teldec 1985
- J. S. Bach: Complete Cantatas Vol. 9, Ton Koopman, Amsterdam Baroque Orchestra & Choir, Bernhard Landauer, Christoph Prégardien, Klaus Mertens, Antoine Marchand 1998
- Bach Cantatas Vol. 18: New York, John Eliot Gardiner, Monteverdi Choir, English Baroque Soloists, Michael Chance, James Gilchrist, Peter Harvey, Soli Deo Gloria 2000
- J. S. Bach: Cantatas Vol. 17, Masaaki Suzuki, Bach Collegium Japan, Robin Blaze, Gerd Türk, Peter Kooy, BIS 2001
- J. S. Bach: Cantatas for the Complete Liturgical Year Vol. 4, Sigiswald Kuijken, La Petite Bande, Elisabeth Hermans, Petra Noskaiová, Jan Kobow, Jan van der Crabben, Accent 2006
- Desire: J. S. Bach – Cantates, Marcel Ponseele, il Gardellino, Caroline Weynants, Patrick Van Goethem, Marcus Ullmann, Lieven Termont, Passacaille 2008

== Sources ==
- Mein liebster Jesus ist verloren, BWV 154: Scores at the International Music Score Library Project
- Mein liebster Jesus ist verloren BWV 154; BC A 29 / Sacred cantata (1st Sunday of Epiphany) Bach Digital
- Cantata BWV 154 Mein liebster Jesus ist verloren history, scoring, sources for text and music, translations to various languages, discography, discussion, Bach Cantatas Website
- BWV 154 Mein liebster Jesus ist verloren English translation, University of Vermont
- BWV 154 Mein liebster Jesus ist verloren text, scoring, University of Alberta
- Chapter 36 BWV 154 Mein liebster Jesus ist verloren, A listener and student guide by Julian Mincham, 2010
- BWV 154.3 bach-chorales.com
- BWV 154.8 bach-chorales.com
