= Jimmy Reece =

American racing driver (1929–1958)

- Born: James Garland Reece; November 17, 1929 Oklahoma City, Oklahoma, U.S.
- Died: September 28, 1958 (aged 28) Trenton, New Jersey, U.S.

Champ Car career
- 58 races run over 7 years
- Years active: 1952–1958
- Best finish: 4th (tie) – 1954
- First race: 1952 Indianapolis 500 (Indianapolis)
- Last race: 1958 Trenton 100 (Trenton)
Wins	Podiums	Poles
0	7	3

Formula One World Championship career
- Active years: 1952, 1954–1958
- Team(s): Pankratz, Kurtis Kraft, Watson, Lesovsky
- Entries: 6
- Championships: 0
- Wins: 0
- Podiums: 0
- Career points: 0
- Pole positions: 0
- Fastest laps: 0
- First entry: 1952 Indianapolis 500
- Last entry: 1958 Indianapolis 500

James Garland Reece Sr. (November 17, 1929 – September 28, 1958) was an American racecar driver. He died in an accident during a 1958 Champ Car race at Trenton Speedway.

== 1954 Bobby Ball Memorial race ==
On November 8, 1954, Reece crashed during the Bobby Ball Memorial, an AAA Champ Car event held at the Arizona State Fairgrounds, sustaining "a punctured lung, fractured right shoulder and possible internal injuries when his car flipped coming out of the south turn [...] and crashed into the east wall."

== AAA Championship Trail ==
Reece and Bill Vukovich tied for fourth in the 1954 AAA championship standings. Reece scored 1000 points in six races by finishing second, third or fifth; Vukovich scored 1000 points for winning the Indianapolis 500.

== Death ==
On September 28, 1958, Reece was killed during a USAC Champ Car race held at Trenton Speedway. On the first turn of the last lap, Reece's inside wheels got into the dirt next to the concrete track, causing his car to change its direction and run up an embankment. After bursting through a two-foot wooden fence on the edge of the track, the Kurtis 500G spiraled through the air and smashed down on a hurricane fence, having ejected Reece, who died of multiple injuries in an ambulance.

== Indianapolis 500 results ==
Year	Car	Start	Qual	Rank	Finish	Laps	Led	Retired
1952	37	23	133.993	29	7	200	0	Running
1954	25	7	138.312	18	17	194	0	Flagged
1955	5	15	139.991	12	33	10	0	Rod
1956	26	21	142.885	14	9	200	0	Running
1957	5	6	142.006	11	18	182	0	Throttle
1958	16	3	145.513	3	6	200	0	Running
Totals						976	0	

Starts	6
Poles	0
Front Row	1
Wins	0
Top 5	0
Top 10	3
Retired	2

== World Championship career summary ==
The Indianapolis 500 was part of the FIA World Championship from 1950 through 1960. Drivers competing at Indy during those years were credited with World Championship points and participation. Reece participated in six World Championship races but scored no World Championship points.
