= Johann Friedrich Fasch =

German violinist and composer (1688–1758)

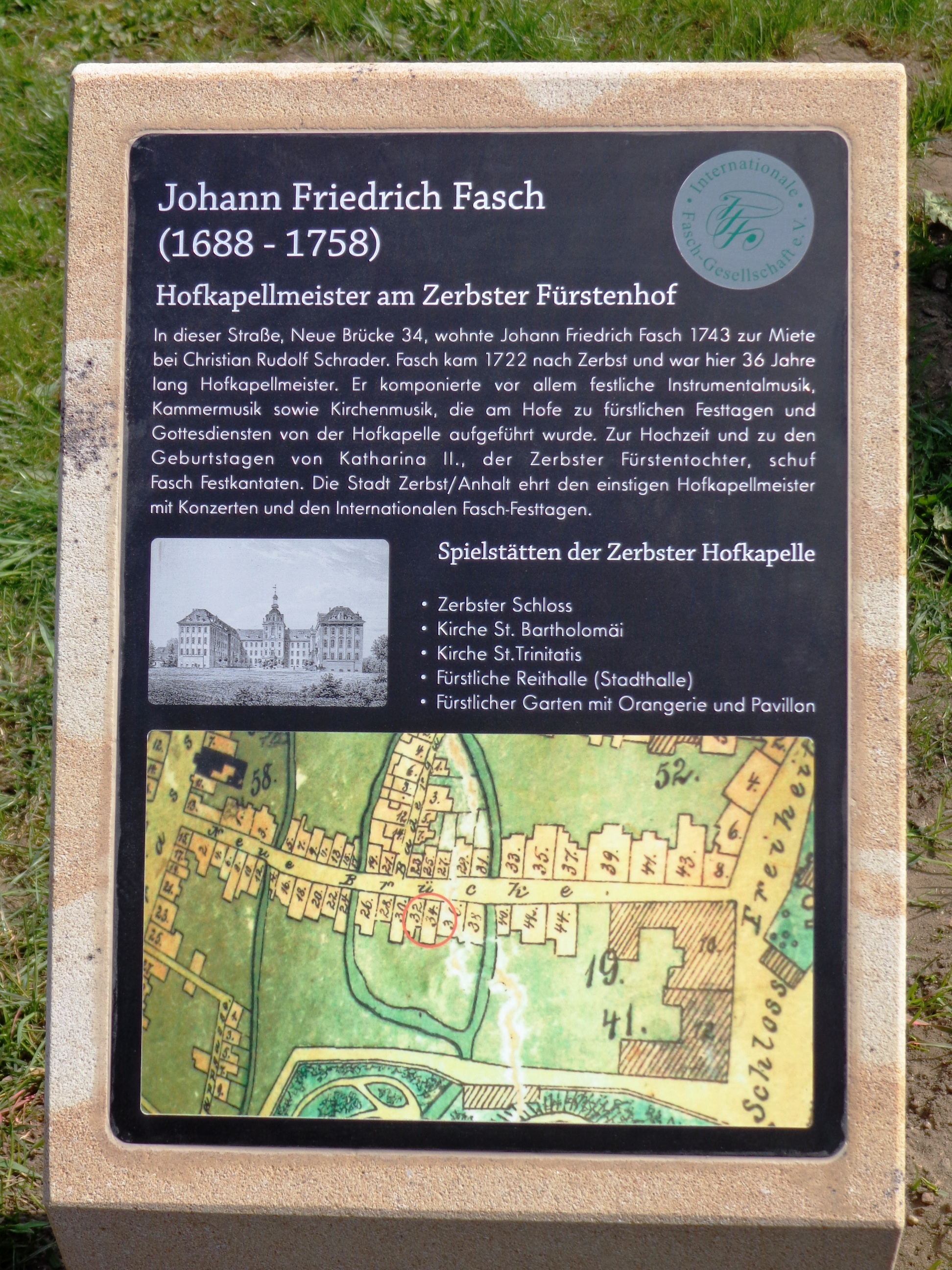
Johann Friedrich Fasch memorial in Zerbst, Germany, unveiled in April 2013

Johann Friedrich Fasch (15 April 1688 – 5 December 1758) was a German violinist and composer. Much of his music is in the Baroque-Classical transitional style known as galant.

== Life ==
Fasch was born in the town of Buttelstedt, 11 km north of Weimar, the eldest child of schoolmaster Friedrich Georg Fasch and his wife Sophie Wegerig, from Leißling near Weißenfels. After his father's death in 1700, Fasch lived with his maternal uncle, the clergyman Gottfried Wegerig in Göthewitz, and it was presumably in this way that he made the acquaintance of the Opera composer Reinhard Keiser.

Fasch was a choirboy in Weissenfels and studied under Johann Kuhnau at the St. Thomas School in Leipzig. It was in Leipzig in 1708 that he founded a Collegium Musicum. In 1711 he wrote an opera to be performed at the Peter-Paul Festival in Naumburg, and a second one for the festival in 1712.

In 1714, unable to procure aristocratic patronage for a journey to Italy, Fasch instead travelled to Darmstadt to study composition for three months under his former Leipzig prefect Christoph Graupner and Gottfried Grünewald. He then traveled extensively in the Holy Roman Empire, becoming a violinist in the orchestra in Bayreuth in 1714, was an amanuensis in Gera till 1719 and from 1719 until 1721 held a court post as organist in Greiz.

His next major post was Prague, where he served for two years as Kapellmeister and court composer to Count Morzin. In 1722, he "reluctantly accepted the position" of court Kapellmeister at Zerbst, Saxony-Anhalt, a post he held until his death. (The organist Johann Ulich was his assistant.) Also in 1722, he was invited to apply for the position of Thomaskantor in Leipzig at his alma mater, the St. Thomas School, but he chose to withdraw his name from the competition. The Leipzig opening was eventually filled by Johann Sebastian Bach, who had considerable esteem for Fasch.

== Works ==
His works include cantatas, concertos, symphonies, and chamber music. None of his music was published in his lifetime, and according to The New Grove Dictionary of Music and Musicians in 2014, "it appears that most of his vocal works (including 9 complete cantata cycles, at least 14 masses and four operas) are lost, while the instrumental works are mostly extant." However, his music was "widely performed" in his day and was held in high regard by contemporaries. Georg Philipp Telemann performed a cycle of his church cantatas in 1733 in Hamburg; an organ work once attributed to Johann Sebastian Bach as BWV 585 is now known to be an arrangement of movements from a Fasch trio sonata; and Bach's Collegium Musicum in Leipzig (a different group than the one founded by Fasch) performed some of Fasch's Orchestral Suites (ten of them, according to Hugo Riemann in 1900, based on his examination of copies in the library of the St. Thomas School, which Riemann said were partly in Bach's hand. Only one of these suites survived World War II; it had in Fasch's era fallen into the hands of Bach's student Carl Gotthelf Gerlach).

In 1900, Riemann asserted that Fasch's style was an important link between the Baroque and Classical periods, and that he was one of those who "set instrumental music entirely on its feet and displaced fugal writing with modern 'thematic' style’"; New Grove's entry on Fasch states, "Later research has largely confirmed [Riemann's] assessment."

== Legacy ==
Fasch died in Zerbst at the age of 70 on 5 December 1758. He was the father of Carl Friedrich Christian Fasch, born on 18 November 1736, like his father a musician of note. The city of Zerbst/Anhalt has been hosting International Festivals since 1983, biennially since 1993. The Sixteenth International Fasch Festival (2021) was cancelled due to COVID-19 restrictions.

== Works list ==
This listing is based on Rüdiger Pfeiffer's now out-dated Fasch Werke Verzeichnis. The Internationale Fasch Gesellschaft e.V. has been working on a new online Fasch-Verzeichnis, which is now called Fasch-Repertorium. Its main contributor, Dr. Gottfried Gille, gave a paper on the project's progress at the 2013 international Fasch conference, held on the occasion of the twelfth International Fasch Festival (18-21 April 2013). All papers presented at the conference were published in vol. 12 of Fasch-Studien.

=== Operas ===
- Fwv A. Operas (lost)

=== Serenatas ===
- Fwv B: 1. Serenata (lost)
- Fwv B: 2. Serenata (lost)
- Fwv B: 3. Freudenbezeugung der vier Tageszeiten, autograph score at D-DS
- Fwv B: 4. Beglückter Tag (for the birthday of Catherine the Great, 1757), autograph score and performing materials in the Sing-Akademie Berlin archive, D-B; performed at 10th Fasch-Festtage on 10 April 2008

=== Sacred cantatas for occasions ===
- Fwv C:B 1. Beständigkeit bleibt mein Vergnügen

=== Sacred cantatas ===
- Fwv D:B 1. Bewahre deinen Fuss
- Fwv D:D 1. Dein allerhöchster Adel
- Fwv D:D 2. Der Gottlose ist wie ein Wetter
- Fwv D:D 3. Die den Herrn vertrauen
- Fwv D:D 4. Die Gerechten müssen sich freuen
- Fwv D:D 5. Die so das Land des Lichts bewohnen
- Fwv D:D 6. Die Starken bedürfen des Arztes nicht
- Fwv D:D 7. Die Starken bedürfen des Arztes nicht
- Fwv D:D 8. Du bist Christus, des lebendigen Gottes Sohn
- Fwv D:D 9. Du bist mein Gott, ich bitte dich
- Fwv D:D10. Du sollst Gott, deinen Herrn, lieben
- Fwv D:E 1. Ehre sei Gott in der Höhe
- Fwv D:E 2. Er hat grosse Dinge an mir getan
- Fwv D:E 3. Es erhub sich ein Streit
- Fwv D:E 4. Es haben dir, Herr, die Hoffärtigen
- Fwv D:E 5. Es wird des Herrn Tag kommen
- Fwv D:E 6. Es wird ein unbarmherzig Gericht
- Fwv D:G 1. Gehet zu seinen Toren ein
- Fwv D:G 2. Gelobet sei der Herr täglich
- Fwv D:G 3. Gottes und Marien Kind
- Fwv D:G 4. Gott hat die Zeit der Unwissenheit übersehen
- Fwv D:G 5. Gott ist die Liebe
- Fwv D:G 6. Gott ist die Liebe
- Fwv D:G 7. Gott ist ein rechter Richter
- Fwv D:G 8. Gott will, dass allen Menschen
- Fwv D:G 9. Gott wir warten deiner Güte
- Fwv D:G10. Gott wir warten deiner Güte
- Fwv D:H 1. Herr, gehe nicht ins Gericht
- Fwv D:H 2. Herr, lehre uns bedenken
- Fwv D:H 3. Herr, wenn Trübsal da ist
- Fwv D:I 1. Ich bin der Weg
- Fwv D:I 2. Ich danke dem Herrn von ganzem Herzen
- Fwv D:I 3. Ich freue mich im Herrn
- Fwv D:I 4. Ich halte mich, Herr, zu deinen Altar
- Fwv D:I 5. Ich hebe meine Augen auf
- Fwv D:I 6. Ich hoffe darauf, dass du so gnädig bist
- Fwv D:I 7. Ich war tot, und siehe, ich bin lebendig
- Fwv D:I 8. In der Welt habt ihr Angst
- Fwv D:J 1. Jauchzet dem Herrn alle Welt; Edition 2008 Gottfried Gille for Prima la musica!
- Fwv D:K 1. Kommet her zu mir alle
- Fwv D:K 2. Kündlich gross ist das gottselige Geheimnis
- Fwv D:L 1. Leben wir, so leben wir dem Herrn
- Fwv D:L 2. Lobe den Herrn, meine Seele
- Fwv D:L 3. Lobe den Herrn, meine Seele
- Fwv D:M 1. Mein Seel erhebt den Herren mein
- Fwv D:N 1. Niemand kennet den Sohn
- Fwv D:N 2. Niemand kennet den Sohn
- Fwv D:R 1. Rast und tobt, ihr stolzen Feinde
- Fwv D:S 1. Sage mir an, du, den meine Seele liebet
- Fwv D:S 2. Sanftes Brausen, süsses Sausen; Edition 2008 Gottfried Gille for Prima la musica!
- Fwv D:S 3. Seid untereinander freundlich, herzlich
- Fwv D:S 4. Sei getreu bis in den Tod
- Fwv D:S 5. Selig sind, die nicht sehen und doch gläuben
- Fwv D:S 6. Siehe um Trost war mir sehr bange
- Fwv D:S 7. Siehe zu, dass deine Gottesfurcht nicht
- Fwv D:T 1. Trachtet am ersten nach dem Reiche Gottes
- Fwv D:U 1. Unser Wandel ist im Himmel
- Fwv D:W 1. Wachet und betet, das ihr nicht in Anfechtung
- Fwv D:W 2. Welt und Teufel, tobt ihr noch
- Fwv D:W 3. Welt, du magst mich immer hassen (fragment)
- Fwv D:W 4. Wer sich selbst erhöhet
- Fwv D:W 5. Wie Gott liebt und vergibt
- Fwv D:W 6. Will mir jemand nachfolgen
- Fwv D:W 7. Wirf dein Anliegen auf den Herrn
- Fwv D:W 8. Wir müssen alle offenbar werden
- Fwv D:W 9. Wir wissen, dass der Sohn Gottes
- Fwv D:Z 1. Zion mach in deinen Toren
- Fwv D:Z 2. Zur Mitternacht war ein Geschrei (fragment)

=== Motets ===
- Fwv E:B 1. Beschliesset einen Rat

=== Passion oratorios ===
- Fwv F: 1 Passio Jesu Christi ("Brockes Passion")

=== Masses ===
- Fwv G:B 1. Missa brevis in B♭ major
- Fwv G:D 1. Mass in D major
- Fwv G:D 2. Mass in D major
- Fwv G:D 3. Missa brevis in D major
- Fwv G:D 4. Missa brevis in D major
- Fwv G:D 5. Missa brevis in D major
- Fwv G:D 6. Credo in D major
- Fwv G:D 7. Credo in D major - NOT FASCH, but Johann David Heinichen
- Fwv G:e 1. German Mass in E minor
- Fwv G:F 1. Mass in F major
- Fwv G:F 2. Missa brevis in F major
- Fwv G:F 3. Quoniam in F major
- Fwv G:g 1. Missa brevis in G minor

=== Canticles ===
- Fwv H:G 1. Magnificat in G major

=== Psalm settings ===
- Fwv I:B 1. Beatus vir in G major
- Fwv I:C 1. Confiteor in D major
- Fwv I:D 1. Dixit Dominus in G major
- Fwv I:L 1. Laetatus sum in F♯ minor
- Fwv I:L 2. Lauda Jerusalem in D major
- Fwv I:L 3. Laudate Pueri Dominum in A major
- Fwv I:N 1. Nisi Dominus in D major

=== Orchestral suites ===
(Unless otherwise stated, these are scored for 2 oboes, bassoon, strings and Basso continuo

- Fwv K:A 1. Suite for violin, 2 oboes & 2 bassoons in A major
- Fwv K:A 2. Suite for 2 flutes, 2 oboes & bassoon in A major
- Fwv K:A 3. Suite for 2 oboes & bassoon in A major
- Fwv K:a 1. Suite for 2 flutes, 2 oboes & bassoon in A minor
- Fwv K:a 2. Suite for 2 oboes & 2 bassoons in A minor
- Fwv K:a 3. Suite for 2 oboes & 2 bassoons in A minor
- Fwv K:a 4. Suite for 2 oboes & bassoon in A minor
- Fwv K:B 1. Suite for 2 orchestras (3 flutes, 3 oboes, 2 bassoons, strings and basso continuo in each orchestra)
- Fwv K:B 2. Suite for 2 flutes, 2 oboes & bassoon in B♭ major
- Fwv K:B 3. Suite for 2 flutes, 2 oboes & bassoon in B♭ major
- Fwv K:B 4. Suite for 2 flutes, 2 oboes & bassoon in B♭ major
- Fwv K:B 5. Suite for 2 oboes & bassoon in B♭ major
- Fwv K:B 6. Suite for 2 oboes & bassoon, strings and b.c.in B♭ major* Modern edition by W.Jaksch http://www.imslp.org
- Fwv K:B 7. Suite for 2 oboes & bassoon in B♭ major
- Fwv K:B 8. Suite for 2 oboes & bassoon in B♭ major
- Fwv K:B 9. Suite for 2 oboes & bassoon in B♭ major
- Fwv K:B10. Suite for 2 oboes & bassoon in B♭ major
- Fwv K:C 1. Suite for 2 oboes & 2 bassoons in C major * Modern edition: Hans-Heinrich Kriegel; Bochum: 1998
- Fwv K:C 2. Suite in C major (lost)
- Fwv K:C 3. Suite for 2 oboes & bassoon in C major (lost)
- Fwv K:D 1. Suite for 3 trumpets & winds in D major
- Fwv K:D 2. Suite for 3 trumpets & winds in D major
- Fwv K:D 3. Suite for 2 trumpets, 3 oboes & bassoon in D major
- Fwv K:D 4. Suite for 2 trumpets, 2 oboes & bassoon in D major
- Fwv K:D 5. Suite for 3 horns, 3 oboes & 2 bassoons in D major
- Fwv K:D 6. Suite for wind septet in D major
- Fwv K:D 7. Suite for 2 flutes,2 oboes & bassoon, 2 horns, strings and b.c. in D major * Modern edition by W.Jaksch http://www.imslp.org
- Fwv K:D 8. Suite for wind septet in D major
- Fwv K:D 9. Suite for wind septet in D major
- Fwv K:D10. Suite for wind septet in D major
- Fwv K:D11. Suite in D major (lost)
- Fwv K:D12. Suite for 2 horns, 2 oboes & bassoon in D major
- Fwv K:D13. Suite for 2 horns, 2 oboes & bassoon in D major
- Fwv K:D14. Suite for 2 horns, 2 oboes & bassoon in D major * Modern edition in preparation by Kim Patrick Clow for Prima la musica!
- Fwv K:D15. Suite for 2 horns, 2 oboes & bassoon in D major
- Fwv K:D16. Suite for 2 flutes, 2 oboes & bassoon in D major
- Fwv K:D17. Suite for 2 flutes, 2 oboes & bassoon in D major
- Fwv K:D18. Suite for 2 flutes, 2 oboes & bassoon in D major
- Fwv K:D19. Suite in D major (lost)
- Fwv K:D20. Suite for 2 oboes & 2 bassoons in D major
- Fwv K:D21. Suite for 2 oboes & bassoon in D major
- Fwv K:D22. Suite for 2 oboes & bassoon in D major
- Fwv K:D23. Suite for 2 oboes & bassoon in D major
- Fwv K:D24. Suite for 2 oboes & bassoon in D major
- Fwv K:D25. Suite for 2 oboes & bassoon in D major
- Fwv K:D26. Suite for 2 oboes & bassoon in D major
- Fwv K:d 1. Suite in D minor (lost)
- Fwv K:d 2. Suite for 3 flutes, 3 oboes & bassoon in D minor
- Fwv K:d 3. Suite for chalumeau, 2 oboes & bassoon in D minor
- Fwv K:d 4. Suite for 2 oboes & bassoon in D minor
- Fwv K:d 5. Suite for 2 oboes & bassoon in D minor
- Fwv K:d 6. Suite for 2 oboes & bassoon in D minor
- Fwv K:e 1. Suite for 2 flutes, 2 oboes & bassoon in E minor
- Fwv K:e 2. Suite for 2 oboes & bassoon in E minor
- Fwv K:e 3. Suite for 2 oboes & bassoon in E minor
- Fwv K:Es1. Suite for 2 oboes & bassoon in E♭ major
- Fwv K:F 1. Suite for wind septet in F major
- Fwv K:F 2. Suite in F major (lost)
- Fwv K:F 3. Suite for 2 horns, 2 oboes & bassoon in F major
- Fwv K:F 4. Suite for 2 horns, 2 oboes & bassoon in F major
- Fwv K:F 5. Suite for 2 horns, 2 oboes & bassoon in F major
- Fwv K:F 6. Suite for 2 flutes, 2 oboes & bassoon in F major
- Fwv K:F 7. Suite for 2 oboes & 2 bassoons in F major * Modern edition in preparation by Kim Patrick Clow for Prima la musica!
- Fwv K:F 8. Suite for 2 oboes & bassoon in F major
- Fwv K:F 9. Suite in F major (lost)
- Fwv K:G 1. Suite for violin & wind septet in G major
- Fwv K:G 2. Suite for violin & oboe concertante in G major * Modern edition in preparation by Kim Patrick Clow for Prima la musica!
- Fwv K:G 3. Suite for wind septet in G major
- Fwv K:G 4. Suite for wind septet in G major
- Fwv K:G 5. Suite for 4 horns, 3 oboes & bassoon in G major
- Fwv K:G 6. Suite in G major (lost)
- Fwv K:G 7. Suite in G major (lost)
- Fwv K:G 8. Suite for 3 flutes & 2 bassoons in G major * Modern edition in preparation by Hans-Heinrich Kriegel for Prima la musica!
- Fwv K:G 9. Suite for 2 oboes & 2 bassoons in G major
- Fwv K:G10. Suite for 2 flutes, 2 oboes & bassoon in G major
- Fwv K:G11. Suite for 2 flutes, 2 oboes & bassoon in G major
- Fwv K:G12. Suite for 2 flutes, 2 oboes & bassoon in G major
- Fwv K:G13. Suite for 2 oboes & bassoon in G major
- Fwv K:G14. Suite for 2 flutes, 2 oboes & bassoon in G major (lost)
- Fwv K:G15. Suite for 3 oboes & bassoon in G major
- Fwv K:G16. Suite for 2 oboes & bassoon in G major * Modern edition in preparation by Kim Patrick Clow for Prima la musica!
- Fwv K:G17. Suite for 2 oboes & bassoon in G major
- Fwv K:G18. Suite for 2 oboes & bassoon in G major
- Fwv K:G19. Suite for 2 oboes & bassoon in G major
- Fwv K:G20. Suite for 2 oboes & bassoon in G major
- Fwv K:G21. Suite for 2 oboes & bassoon in G major
- Fwv K:G22. Suite for 2 oboes & bassoon in G major (lost)
- Fwv K:g 1. Suite for 2 oboes & bassoon in G minor
- Fwv K:g 2. Suite for 3 oboes & bassoon in G minor
- Fwv K:g 3. Suite for 2 oboes & 2 bassoons in G minor
- Fwv K:g 4. Suite for 2 oboes & bassoon in G minor
- Fwv K:g 5. Suite for 2 oboes & bassoon in G minor
- Fwv K:g 6. Suite in G minor (lost)
- Fwv K:g 7. Suite for 2 oboes & bassoon in G minor

Johann Friedrich Fasch Concerto in D for Three Choirs ("Royal Fireworks Music"), * Fwv L:D13, movement no 2 "Andante"

=== Concertos ===
- Fwv L:A 1. Violin Concerto in A major
- Fwv L:A 2. Violin Concerto in A major
- Fwv L:A 3. Violin Concerto in A major
- Fwv L:a 1. Oboe Concerto in A minor
- Fwv L:a 2. Violin Concerto in A minor
- Fwv L:B 1. Concerto for chalumeau in B♭ major
- Fwv L:B 2. Violin Concerto in B♭ major
- Fwv L:B 3. Concerto grosso in B♭ major
- Fwv L:B 4. Concerto grosso in B♭ major
- Fwv L:C 1. Oboe Concerto in C major
- Fwv L:C 2. Bassoon Concerto in C major
- Fwv L:C 3. Concerto for flute, violin, bassoon & b.c. in C major
- Fwv L:c 1. Concerto for bassoon, strings & b.c. in C minor
- Fwv L:c 2. Concerto for 2 oboes, bassoon, strings & b.c. in C minor
- Fwv L:D 1. Concerto for trumpet & 2 oboes in D major
- Fwv L:D 2. Violin Concerto in D major
- Fwv L:D 3. Violin Concerto in D major
- Fwv L:D 4. Violin Concerto in D major
- Fwv L:D 4a. Violin Concerto in D major (* Fwv L:D 4a)
- Fwv L:D 5. Violin Concerto in D major
- Fwv L:D 6. Violin Concerto in D major
- Fwv L:D 7. Violin Concerto in D major
- Fwv L:D 8. Violin Concerto in D major
- Fwv L:D 9. Concerto for 2 flutes in D major
- Fwv L:D10. Concerto for flute and oboe in D major
- Fwv L:D11. Concerto for flute and oboe in D major
- Fwv L:D12. Concerto in D major (lost)
- Fwv L:D13. Concerto for triple wind choirs in D major
- Fwv L:D14. Concerto grosso in D major
- Fwv L:D15. Concerto grosso in D major
- Fwv L:D16. Concerto grosso in D major
- Fwv L:D17. Concerto grosso in D major
- Fwv L:D18. Concerto grosso in D major
- Fwv L:D19. Concerto grosso in D major
- Fwv L:D20. Concerto grosso in D major
- Fwv L:D21. Concerto grosso in D major
- Fwv L:D22. Concerto grosso in D major
- Fwv L:d 1. Lute Concerto in D minor
- Fwv L:d 2. Oboe Concerto in D minor
- Fwv L:d 3. Oboe Concerto in D minor
- Fwv L:d 4. Concerto for oboe and violin in D minor
- Fwv L:d 5. Concerto in D minor (lost)
- Fwv L:d 6. Concerto for flute, violin, bassoon & b.c. in D minor
- Fwv L:d 7. Concerto grosso in D minor
- Fwv L:e 1. Concerto for flute and oboe in E minor
- Fwv L:Es1. Concerto grosso in E♭ major
- Fwv L:F 1. Concerto in F major (lost)
- Fwv L:F 2. Violin Concerto in F major
- Fwv L:F 3. Concerto grosso in F major
- Fwv L:F 4. Concerto grosso in F major
- Fwv L:F 5. Concerto grosso in F major
- Fwv L:F 6. Concerto for Alto recorder in F major * Modern edition by Johannes Pausch for Edition Musiklandschaften Hamburg
- Fwv L:G 1. Concerto in G major (lost)
- Fwv L:G 2. Oboe Concerto in G major
- Fwv L:G 3. Oboe Concerto in G major
- Fwv L:G 4. Concerto for violin, 2 flutes, 2 oboes, bassoon, strings, continuo in G major
- Fwv L:G 5. Violin Concerto in G major
- Fwv L:G 6. Violin Concerto in G major
- Fwv L:G 7. Violin Concerto in G major
- Fwv L:G 8. Concerto for flute and oboe in G major
- Fwv L:G 9. Concerto for 2 oboes in G major
- Fwv L:G10. Concerto for 2 oboes in G major
- Fwv L:G11. Concerto grosso in G major
- Fwv L:G12. Concerto grosso in G major
- Fwv L:G13. Concerto grosso in G major
- Fwv L:g 1. Oboe Concerto in G minor
- Fwv L:g 2. Concerto in G minor (lost)
- Fwv L:g 3. Concerto in G minor (lost)
- Fwv L:g 4. Concerto for 2 oboes in G minor
- Fwv L:h 1. Concerto for flute and oboe in B minor
- Fwv L:h 2. Concerto for flute and oboe in B minor

=== Symphonies ===
- Fwv M:A 1. Symphony in A major
- Fwv M:A 2. Symphony in A major [Possibly Carl Friedrich Fasch]
- Fwv M:A 3. Symphony in A major
- Fwv M:a 1. Symphony in A minor
- Fwv M:B 1. Symphony in B♭ major
- Fwv M:B 2. Symphony in B♭ major
- Fwv M:B 3. Symphony in B♭ major
- Fwv M:C 1. Symphony in C major
- Fwv M:D 1. Symphony in D major
- Fwv M:D 2. Symphony in D major
- Fwv M:F 1. Symphony in F major
- Fwv M:Fis. Symphony in F♯ major
- Fwv M:G 1. Symphony in G major
- Fwv M:G 2. Symphony in G major
- Fwv M:G 3. Symphony in G major
- Fwv M:G 4. Symphony in G major
- Fwv M:G 5. Symphony in G major
- Fwv M:G 6. Symphony in G major
- Fwv M:g 1. Symphony in G minor

Chamber pieces

- Fwv N:a 1. Trio for 2 violins & continuo in A minor
- Fwv N:B 1. Quartet for recorder, oboe, violin & continuo in B♭ major
- Fwv N:B 2. Quartet for 2 oboes, bassoon & continuo in B♭ major
- Fwv N:B 3. Trio for 2 oboes & continuo in B♭ major
- Fwv N:C 1. Bassoon Sonata in C major
- Fwv N:c 1. Quartet for 2 violins, pasetel & continuo in C minor
- Fwv N:c 2. Trio for 2 violins & continuo in C minor
- Fwv N:D 1. Quartet for flute, violin, bassoon & continuo in D major
- Fwv N:D 2. Trio for flute, violin & continuo in D major
- Fwv N:D 3. Trio for flute, violin & continuo in D major
- Fwv N:D 4. Trio for 2 violins & continuo in D major
- Fwv N:d 1. Quartet for 2 oboes, bassoon & continuo in D minor
- Fwv N:d 2. Quartet for 2 oboes, bassoon & continuo in D minor
- Fwv N:d 3. Quartet for 2 violins, viola & b.c. in D minor
- Fwv N:d 4. Trio for 2 violins & continuo in D minor
- Fwv N:E 1. Trio for 2 violins & continuo in E major
- Fwv N:e 1. Trio for 2 oboes & continuo in E minor
- Fwv N:F 1. Quartet for 2 oboes & 2 bassoons in F major
- Fwv N:F 2. Quartet for 2 oboes, bassoon & continuo in F major
- Fwv N:F 3. Quartet oboe, violin, horn & continuo in F major
- Fwv N:F 4. Quartet for oboe, violin, bassoon & continuo in F major
- Fwv N:F 5. Trio for recorder, bassoon & continuo in F major
- Fwv N:F 6. Trio for 2 oboes & bassoon in F major
- Fwv N:F 7. Trio for 2 violins & continuo in F major
- Fwv N:G 1. Quartet for flute, 2 recorders & continuo in G major
- Fwv N:G 2. Trio for flute, violin & continuo in G major
- Fwv N:G 3. Trio for flute, violin & continuo in G major
- Fwv N:G 4. Trio for 2 violins & continuo in G major
- Fwv N:G 5. Trio for 2 violins & continuo in G major
- Fwv N:G 6. Trio for 2 violins & continuo in G major
- Fwv N:g 1. Quartet for 2 oboes, bassoon & continuo in G minor
- Fwv N:g 2. Trio for 2 oboes & continuo in G minor

=== Doubtful authenticity ===
- Fwv O:F 1. Fantasie in F major

=== Copies of works by other composers ===
- Fwv Q:D 1. Symphony in D major by Maximilian III
- Fwv Q:deest. Symphony in C major by Carl Hoeckh
- Fwv Q:deest. Symphony in C major by Placidus von Camerloher

== Selected discography ==
- Johann Friedrich Fasch: Orchesterwerke Vol.1. Tempesta di Mare. (Chandos Records CHAN0751, 2007) + vols. 2 [CHAN0783] & 3 [CHAN0791]
- Johann Friedrich Fasch: Concertos for various instruments Vol 1. Il Gardelino. (Accent Records ACC24182, 2007) + vol 2 [Accent Records ACC24252, 2011]
- Johann Friedrich Fasch: Ouverturen. Il Fondamento, Paul Dombrecht. (Fuga Libera, FUG502, 2004)
- Violin concertos from Dresden. Pisendel, Heinichen, Fasch, Handel, Telemann. Johannes Pramsohler. International Baroque Players. (Raumklang RK 3105)
- Violin concertos from Darmstadt. Kress, Telemann, Fasch, Endler. Johannes Pramsohler. Darmstädter Barocksolisten (Audax Records ADX 13716)
- The Dresden Album. Ensemble Diderot. Johannes Pramsohler (Audax Records ADX 13701)
- Johann Friedrich Fasch: Ouvertüren-Sinfonian. Les Amis de Philippe, Ludger Rémy. (Classic Produktion Osnabrück, 7779522, 2015)
- Johann Friedrich Fasch: Dresdner Ouvertüren, Sinfonias & Konzerte. Les Amis de Philippe, Ludger Rémy. (Classic Produktion Osnabrück, 7774242, 2008)
- Johann Friedrich Fasch: Concertos. La Stravaganza, Koln. (Classic Production Osnabruck 7770152, 2004)
- Johann Friedrich Fasch: Cantatas, Psalm, Ouverture & Concerto. Accademia Daniel, Shalev Ad-El. (Classic Production Osnabruck, 9996742, 2000)
- Johann Friedrich Fasch: Concerti & Ouverturen. Kammerorchester Basel, Julia Schroder. (Deutsche Harmonia Mundi, 88697446412, 2009)
- Johann Friedrich Fasch: Trios and Sonatas. Epoca Barocca. (Classic Produktion Osnabrück 7772042, 2007)
- Johann Friedrich Fasch: Quartette & Konzerte. Ensemble Marsyas. (Linn Records CKD467, 2013)
- Johann Friedrich Fasch: Quartets & Trio Sonatas. Camerata Koln. (Deutsche Harmonia Mundi 77015-2RG, 1988)
