= Stephan Otto =

Stephan Otto (1603–1656) was a German composer and kantor in Freiberg and Schandau. He worked for Count Rudolf von Bünau in Weesenstein, and was mentor and probably teacher to Andreas Hammerschmidt.

== Works, editions, recordings ==
- Dialogue "Mein Sohn warumb hast du uns das gethan"
- Der Mensch vom Weibe geboren. On collection Von den letzten Dingen. Amarcord.
