= Chorale monody =

Early German Baroque sacred composition

In music, a chorale monody was a type of a sacred composition of the very early German Baroque era. It was for solo voice and accompanying instruments, usually basso continuo, and was closely related to the contemporary Italian style of monody. Almost all examples of chorale monodies were written in the first half of the 17th century.

A chorale monody used the text of a chorale, but rarely if ever used the chorale tune, at least not in a recognizable form. It was also related to the concertato madrigal, another contemporary Italian form. While the vocal part in Schein's early examples of the genre retained the rhythmic and melodic flexibility of the Italian monody, it replaced the rhythmically vague bass lines of his model with a stricter rhythmic beat in the instrumental accompaniment. The chorale monody formed the basis for the later development of the solo cantata.

== Composers ==
Composers of chorale monodies included:

- Christoph Bernhard
- Andreas Hammerschmidt
- Johann Erasmus Kindermann
- Sebastian Knüpfer
- Tobias Michael
- Johann Hermann Schein
- Johann Schelle
- Heinrich Schütz
- Thomas Selle
- Johann Staden
- Franz Tunder
- Matthias Weckmann
