= Johann Ulich =

German organist and composer

Johann Ulich, the younger (Wittenberg, 1677-Zerbst, 1742) was a German organist and composer in Zerbst, and music teacher to the princely family.

Ulich was born in 1677 in Wittenberg, Germany. His father, also called Johann Ulich (1634-1712), was organist and Kantor, director of music for Wittenberg's churches, and teacher at the city school. Ulich studied with his father and then from 1695 at the University of Wittenberg. He was employed at the court in Zerbst from 1708 (although his official contract is dated 6 March 1709, the accounts of the St. Bartholomäikirche show that he was paid at least one quarterly salary installment and some of the bonuses that all permanent staff there enjoyed annually in 1708). Almost immediately he started composing music for the court; on 24 June 1708, his cantata "Glückselige Stunden! gesegnetes Licht" for the birthday of Princess Sophia (wife of Prince Carl Wilhelm) was performed and, at least for some years, Ulich seems to have been considered the court composer. This changed in 1716 when Johann Baptist Kuch was appointed Capell Director. When Kuch suddenly vanished from Zerbst in 1722, Ulich temporarily seems to have taken charge of music again. This was short lived as the renowned Johann Friedrich Fasch was appointed court Kapellmeister that same year. Ulich was to work under the younger man as "Organist und Cammer Musico" (according to a petition by his widow for financial assistance to bring up the couple's five children) until his retirement.

== Surviving Works ==
Johann Ulich Sr.

- hymns "Meinen Jesum laß ich nicht", first published "Sieben-Fache Welt- and Himmels-Capell" (edited by Michael Schernak) Wittenberg, 1674; it still appears in the standard Lutheran hymnbook, EKG: 251; "Davidisches Berg-Lied ... An statt eines Täglichen Denck-[,] Danck- und Schuld-Opffers ... abgefasset, und ... mit absonderlicher Melodie bethönet" (Wittenberg, 1687)
- wedding music "Wann die goldne Sonne lacht" (Wittenberg, 1674), "Auf die Gottschalckisch-Frimelische Hochzeit ... verfertigte Aria" (Brieg, 1683), "Gleich und gleich gesellt sich gerne" (Wittenberg, 1686), "Wann die goldne Sonne lacht" (Wittenberg, 1700)
- "Deo dicamus gratias" (SSATB, 2 trumpets, "tamburi", basso continuo; Wittenberg, 1682) [See footnote 3]
- funeral music "Jesu meiner Seelen Wonne" (1685)
- cantata "Zweierlei bitt' ich von dir Herr mein Gott"

Johann Ulich Jr.

- three solo cantatas for soprano and basso continuo
- four sonatinas, two fantasies, two suites, and two sonatas for keyboard (one is specifically for organ)
- 6 sonatas for recorder and basso continuo (the latter part was rediscovered 2002 in the Russian State Library)

== Recordings ==
- "Ihr hellen Sterne des Glücks"; Ina Siedlaczek soprano, Hamburger Ratsmusik, Audite 2013
