= André-Joseph Exaudet =

French violinist and composer

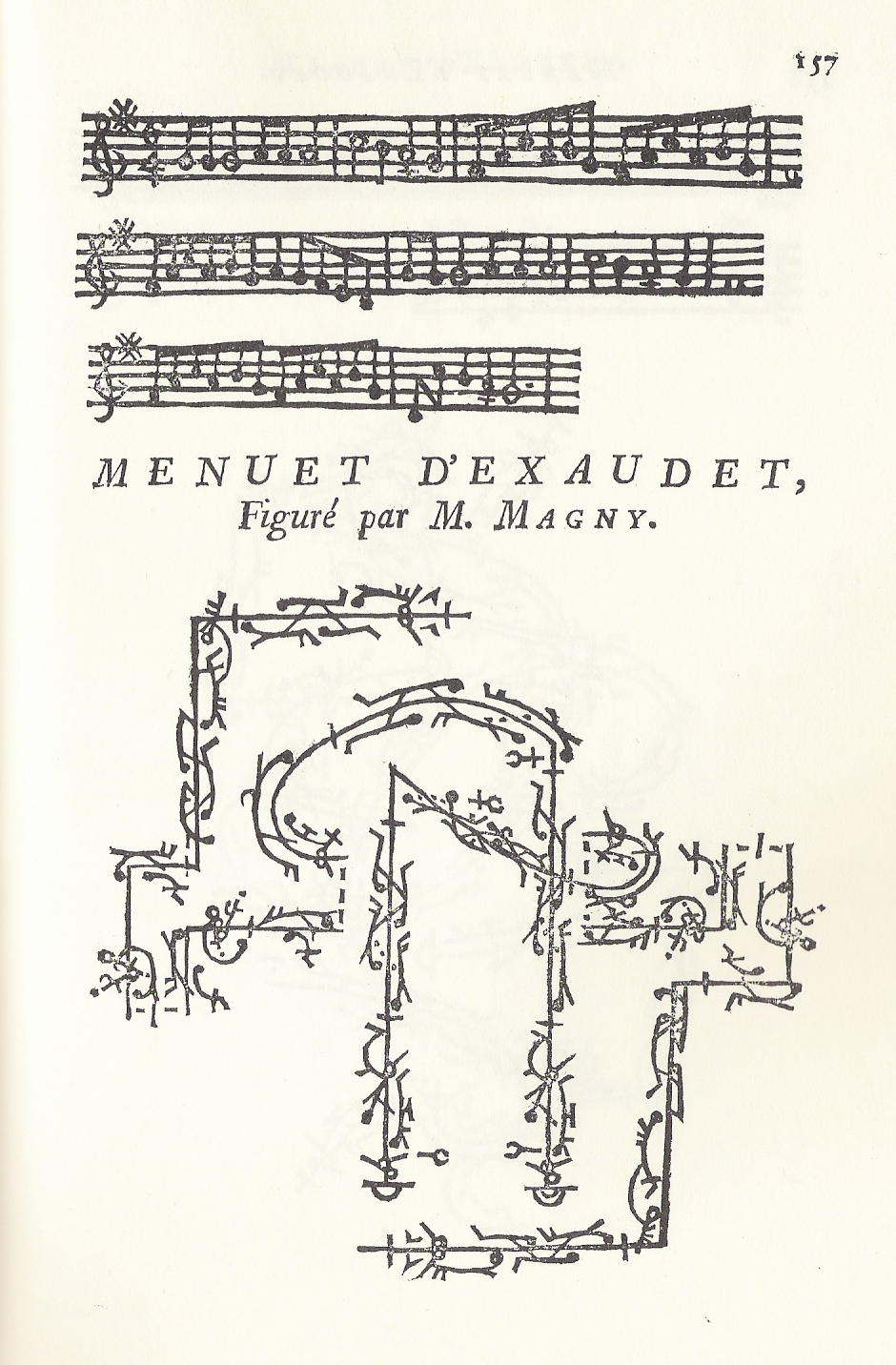
Menuet d'Exaudet (Magny, Principes de chorégraphie, Paris, 1765)

André-Joseph Exaudet (1710–1762) was a French violinist and composer, best known for composing the influential 1751 minuet bearing his name.

The January 1744 issue of the Mercure de France announced the publication of six violin sonatas, mentioning that Exaudet was then first violinist of the Académie Royale de Musique de Rouen. He is also listed in the Paris Opéra archives as a violinist at the Foire St Laurent and the Foire St Germain that year. His name is among the Opéra orchestra in 1749 and the Concert Spirituel orchestra in 1751, and he remained a violinist in both until his death. In 1758 he became an ordinaire de la musique de la chambre du roi. Exaudet also served as maître de violon in the court of the Prince of Condé.

As a composer, Exaudet is best remembered by a celebrated minuet (op.2 no.1, finale). Within a year of its publication Vadé had added a text and incorporated it into his opera Le Suffisant. On 1 October 1763 the Mercure de France announced an orchestral arrangement by Berton and a year later another appeared by L'Abbé le fils. Its popularity was kept alive with a variety of texts; it even became the tune for a revolutionary song, Arbre heureux. It appeared in innumerable collections of airs and instrumental method books, often with variations.

== Selected recordings ==
Concerto à cinq instruments en Mi bémol majeur, Ensemble Diderot. CD Audax 2021

== Bibliography ==
- Copied from "André-Joseph_Exaudet" Choral Public Domain Library.
- Marcelle Benoît (dir.), Dictionnaire de la musique en France aux xvii^{e} et xviii^{e} siècles, Paris, Fayard, 1992, pp. 280–281.
