= Meinen Jesum laß ich nicht =

Lutheran hymn by Christian Keymann

- Lutheran hymn
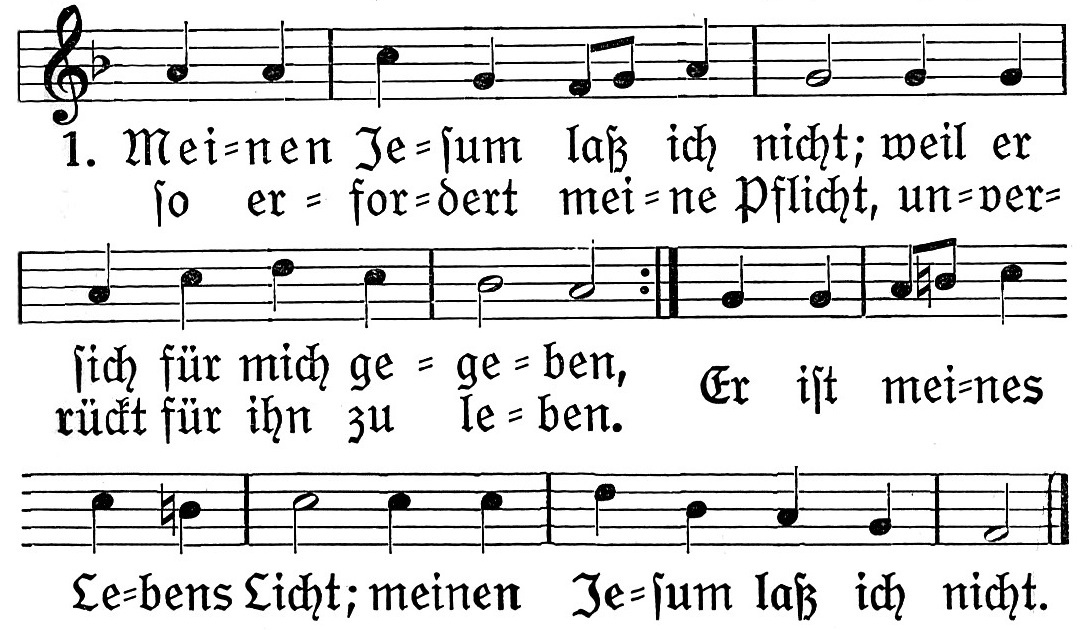
- The hymn with the common (third) melody by Johann Ulich
- English: I shall not leave my Jesus
- Catalogue: Zahn 3449
- Written: 1658
- Text: Christian Keimann
- Language: German
- Melody: Andreas Hammerschmidt (1659); Johann Crüger; Johann Ulich (1674)
- Published: 1659

"Meinen Jesum laß ich nicht" ("I shall not leave my Jesus") is a German Lutheran hymn, with lyrics by Christian Keimann written in 1658. The theme of the hymn is trust in Jesus, based on memorial sermons for John George I, Elector of Saxony recalling conversations of the elector with his minister on his deathbed.

The hymn inspired composers to vocal settings. Johann Sebastian Bach based his chorale cantata Meinen Jesum laß ich nicht, BWV 124 on the first melody by Andreas Hammerschmidt (Zahn No. 3449), and Max Reger used a later melody by Johann Ulich for a chorale cantata in 1906.

The hymn appears, with Ulich's tune, in the Protestant hymnal Evangelisches Gesangbuch as EG 402, in modernized German as "Meinen Jesus lass ich nicht".

== History ==
Christian Keimann worked as director of a Gymnasium in Zittau when he wrote the hymn. It was first published in Andreas Hammerschmidt's choral book Fest-, Buß- und Danklieder (Songs of feast, penitence and thanks) of 1659, and was probably written shortly before. It was prompted by the death of John George I, Elector of Saxony on 8 October 1656, who had repeated the first line of the text and its main idea in conversations with his minister on his deathbed. Weller referred to these conversations in his memorial sermons for the elector, for example on 16 October 1656 in Dresden. Keimann paraphrased excerpts from the sermons in the lyrics.

== Melodies and settings ==
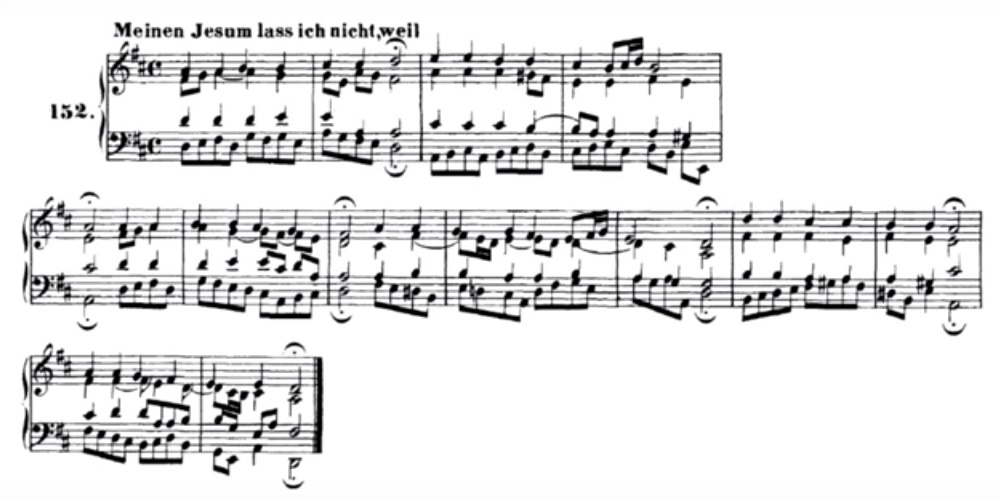
Four-part setting by Bach of Hammerschmidt's melody, BWV 124/6

The hymn is sung to melodies by Hammerschmidt, Crüger and Ulrich.

=== Hammerschmidt ===
In the first print, the hymn is set with a melody by Andreas Hammerschmidt, Zahn 3449, which was still used in the 18th century. Vopelius retained this version in his 1682 Neu Leipziger Gesangbuch, p. 888. Johann Sebastian Bach used the hymn with this melody several times, notably in his chorale cantata Meinen Jesum laß ich nicht, BWV 124, and as a closing movement of Part I in an early version of his St Matthew Passion.

=== Crüger ===
Johann Crüger's melody of "Jesus, meine Zuversicht" was the common melody of the hymn until the 19th century.

=== Ulich ===
A third melody was composed by Johann Ulich in 1674. This melody is most common today, because it was used for the hymnal Deutsches Evangelisches Gesangbuch of 1915 and subsequent versions up to the current Protestant hymnal Evangelisches Gesangbuch, where it appears as EG 402, in the section "Glaube – Liebe – Hoffnung. Geborgen in Gottes Liebe" (Faith – Love – Hope. Sheltered in God's love). Several hymns in English are sung to this hymn tune.

Max Reger based his chorale cantata Meinen Jesum laß ich nicht for soprano, choir, violin, viola and organ and ensemble in 1906 on Ulich's melody. It was written on a commission by the Kantor of the Leipzig University for a service on Totensonntag, the last Sunday of the church year dedicated to the memory of the dead.
