= Pankratz =

Racing car constructor

Pankratz was a racing car constructor. It was established by Bob Pankratz, a race driver. Pankratz cars competed in two FIA World Championship races - the 1954 and 1955 Indy 500.

== World Championship Indy 500 results ==
Season	Driver	Grid	Classification	Points	Note	Race Report
1954	Jimmy Reece	7	17			Report
1955	Jimmy Reece	15	Ret		Engine	Report
