= Lotte Schädle =

German opera singer (born 1926)

- Born: 23 October 1926 (age 99); Füssen, Bavaria, Germany
- Education: Musikhochschule München
- Occupation: Operatic soprano
- Organizations: Bavarian State Opera; Staatstheater Nürnberg
- Awards: Kammersängerin

Lotte Schädle (born 23 October 1926) is a German soprano in opera, operetta, lied and concert. She was a member of the Bavarian State Opera and the Staatstheater Nürnberg, and has performed at international opera houses and festivals, in roles such as Blonde in Mozart's Die Entführung aus dem Serail.

== Career ==
Born in Füssen, Bavaria, Schädle grew up in Unterammergau. Encouraged by her mother, she took private singing lessons from 1948 to 1951, and was successful at several singing competitions. She then studied voice at the Musikhochschule München with Mara Pringsheim. In 1955, she made her debut at the Bavarian State Opera as Blonde in Mozart's Die Entführung aus dem Serail.

In 1957, Schädle was engaged by the Staatstheater Nürnberg as lyrical and coloratura soprano. Here she took part in the premiere of Mark Lothar's opera Der Glücksfischer in 1962. That year, she became a member of the Munich Opera, where she performed major roles such as Gilda in Verdi's Rigoletto, Marie in Lortzing's Der Waffenschmied, and Isotta in Die schweigsame Frau by Richard Strauss. She appeared at the Bayreuth Festival as one of the Flower Girls in Parsifal. In 1965, she appeared as Blonde at the Edinburgh Festival.

Schädle was one of the favourites of the audience in Munich, alongside Erika Köth, Sári Barabás, Hertha Töpper and Rosl Schwaiger. In 1980, she retired from the opera stage at the State Opera in Handel's Judas Maccabaeus.

The soprano, who also enjoyed singing operetta roles such as Saffi in The Gypsy Baron by Johann Strauss, made guest appearances at major stages such as Vienna, Salzburg, Berlin and Zurich. In concert, she was highly esteemed for singing Bach's works. Concert tours took her to Austria, Italy, Switzerland and major German cities. She was honoured by the title Kammersängerin.

== Recordings ==
Recordings with Schädle are held by the German National Library, including:

- Die Entführung aus dem Serail (Deutsche Grammophon 1965)
- Der Freischütz (Ariola-Eurodisc 1967)
- Der Wildschütz (EMI 1963)
- Der Waffenschmied (EMI 1964)
- Schwarzwaldmädel (Ariola-Eurodisc 1964)
- Der Zigeunerbaron (Ariola-Eurodisc 1964)
- Die Abreise (recorded in Munich in 1964, CD Calig 1997)

== Awards ==
- Bayerischer Verdienstorden
