= Andreas Hammerschmidt =

German Bohemian composer and organist

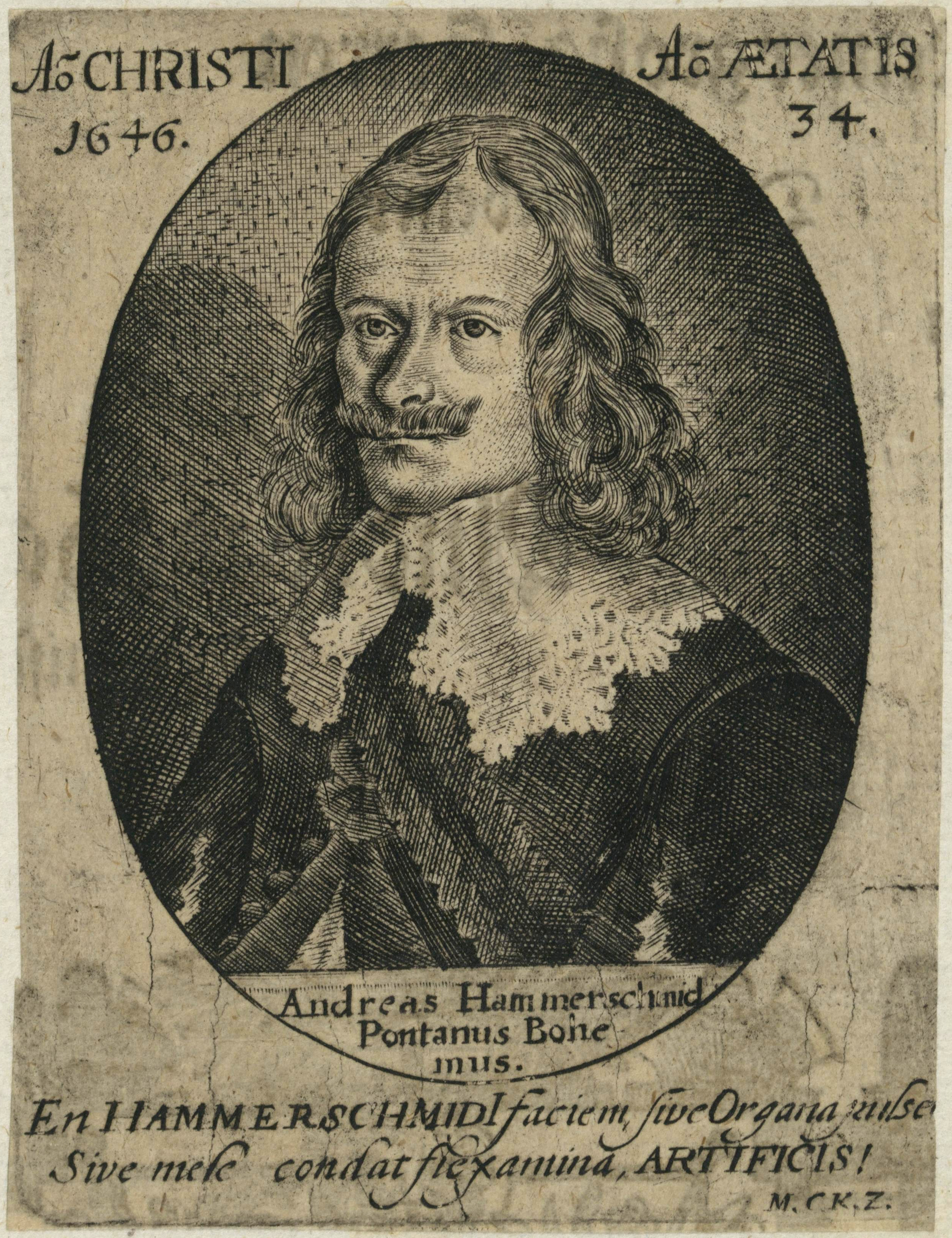
- Born: 1611 or 1612; Brüx, Bohemia
- Died: 29 October 1675; Zittau
- Occupations: Composer; Organist

Andreas Hammerschmidt (1611 or 1612 – 29 October 1675) was a German Bohemian composer and organist of the early to middle Baroque era. He was one of the most significant and popular composers of sacred music in Germany in the middle 17th century. He was nicknamed the "Orpheus of Zittau".

== Life ==
He was born in Brüx to a Saxon father and a Bohemian mother. In 1626 the family had to flee Bohemia, during the Thirty Years' War, after it had become Catholic; they settled in Freiberg, Saxony, where Andreas must have received his musical education. He probably did not study with composer Christoph Demantius, who was Kantor at Freiberg and the most significant musician in the city while Hammerschmidt was there; however he may have known him. Many famous musicians of the early Baroque spent time in Freiberg but it is uncertain which of them taught Hammerschmidt; at any rate he received a superb musical training while there.

Hammerschmidt left Freiberg in 1633, through his mentor Stephan Otto, taking a post as organist for Count Rudolf von Bünau in Weesenstein, but returned to Freiberg the next year as an organist. He was married shortly after his return there, and of his six children three died in infancy. In 1639 he left Freiberg again, moving to Zittau, where he succeeded Christoph Schreiber as organist; he remained in Zittau at this post for the rest of his life. While musical life in Zittau was severely damaged by the Thirty Years' War, including the decimation of the choirs and general reduction in musical standards, Hammerschmidt survived; after the end of the war in 1648 musical life slowly regained its former high standard.

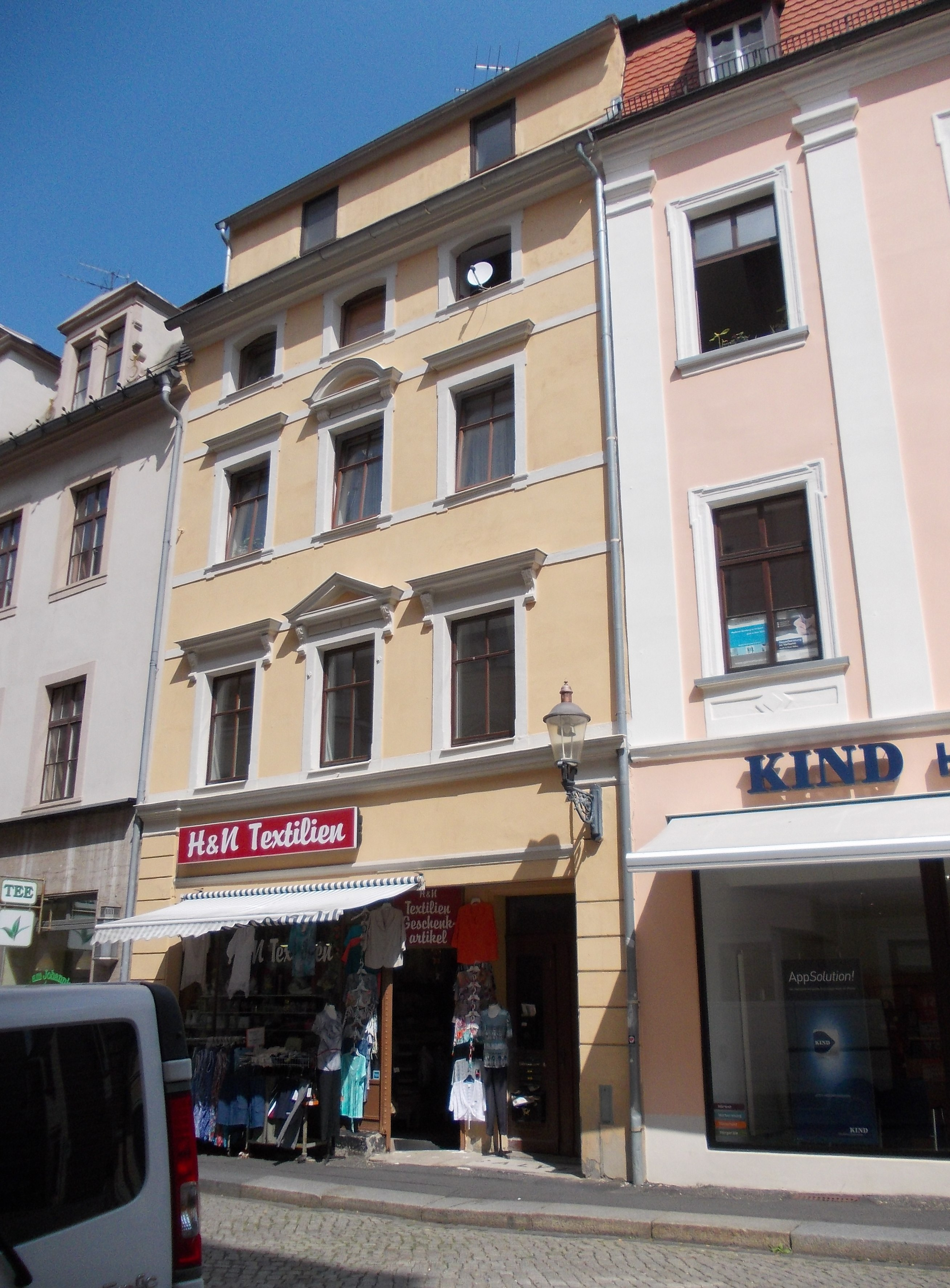
No. 4, Innere Weberstrasse in Zittau, the house where Andreas Hammerschmidt lived from 1656 to 1675.

Exact records of his activities in Zittau are spotty, for the documents were burned in 1757 when the city was destroyed by the Austrians in the Seven Years' War; however Hammerschmidt during this portion of his career became one of the best-known composers in Germany, and the most famous representative of the stile concertato of the generation after Heinrich Schütz. While well-respected and called on as an expert in many matters, he seems to have been prone to outbursts of rage, some of which involved him in brawls. He also seems to have profited well from his activities as a musician and civic leader, and evidently lived in some luxury, having a house in town as well as a country estate.

== Music and influence ==
Hammerschmidt wrote motets, concertos and arias, and almost all of his output is sacred vocal music in the stile concertato. According to Manfred Bukofzer (1947), he "watered down the achievements of Schütz for the multitude." Many of his compositions are in the form of the chorale monody, an adaptation of the early Baroque Italian form to a sacred, and specifically Protestant, purpose. Indeed, Hammerschmidt represents the second generation of composers who distilled a native German Baroque tradition out of forms and styles imported from Italy.

Over 400 works by Hammerschmidt survive, in a total of 14 separate collections. The motets represent a more conservative style, as noted by Hammerschmidt himself, and the concertos—concertato pieces with opposing groups of voices and instruments—are in a current idiom.

Some of his concertos are written for large ensembles, with diverse combinations of instruments and voices (for example, the sets from Gespräche über die Evangelia of 1655–1656; this was long enough after the war that large ensembles were available again). He wrote these pieces for Sundays and church feast days; their structure and intent foreshadowed the later German church cantata, as exemplified most famously by Johann Sebastian Bach. Even Hammerschmidt's masses conform to the concertato style, and are best seen as concertos.

While Hammerschmidt was an organist all of his life, no organ music of his has survived; indeed there is no evidence he published any. Some instrumental music of his has survived in three publications; most of these are suites of dances influenced by the English style which was prevalent in the northern part of Germany at that time.

== Works ==
- Musicalische Andachten (Freiberg, 1639, 1641, 1642)
- Musicalische Gespräche über die Evangelia (Dresden, 1655)
- Erster Fleiß (Freiberg, 1636)
- Kunst des Küssens
- Schaffe in mir Gott ein reines Herz
- Machet die Tore weit
- Verleih uns Frieden Herr (Da pacem Domine)
- Wie bin ich doch so herzlich froh
- Osterdialog
- Freue dich, du Tochter Zion
- Fest- und Zeit-Andachten (Dresden, 1671)
- Ach mein herzliebes Jesulein
- Jauchzet, ihr Himmel
- Lob, Ehr sei Gott
- Schmücket das Fest mit Maien
